= 2025–26 Sabah F.C. season =

Sabah
2025-26 season
- Owner: Sabah Football Club Sdn Bhd
- Head coach: Jean-Paul de Marigny (until 18 December); Alto Linus (interim; 18 December – 25 February); Juan Torres Garrido (from 25 February)
- Stadium: Likas Stadium
- Malaysia Super League: TBD
- Malaysia FA Cup: Runners-up
- Malaysia Cup: Round of 16
- MFL Challenge Cup: Champion
- Top goalscorer: League: 1 goal Gabriel Peres; All: 3 goals Darren Lok
- Highest home attendance: 6,438 vs Kelantan The Real Warriors (League)
- Lowest home attendance: 1,928 vs Melaka (Cup)
- Average home league attendance: 5,233 (League)
Home colours	Away colours

The 2025–26 season is Sabah's tenth competitive season in the highest tier of Malaysian football since the foundation of Malaysia Super League in 2004, and the club's sixth consecutive in the Malaysia Super League.

== Squad ==
As of 23 June 2025

Note: Flags indicate national team as defined under FIFA eligibility rules; some limited exceptions apply. Players may hold more than one non-FIFA nationality.

No.	Pos.	Nation	Player
1	GK	MAS	Ramzi Mustakim
3	DF	MAS	Rawilson Batuil
4	DF	BRA	Gabriel Peres
5	DF	MAS	Daniel Ting
8	MF	MAS	Farhan Roslan
10	MF	ESP	Cifu
11	FW	MAS	Jafri Firdaus Chew
12	FW	MAS	Kumaahran Sathasivam
13	DF	MAS	Dinesh Rajasingam
14	MF	AUS	Dean Pelekanos
15	FW	MAS	Fergus Tierney
19	GK	MAS	Khairul Fahmi Che Mat
20	MF	MAS	Gary Steven Robbat
21	FW	BIH	Ajdin Mujagić
22	MF	MAS	Stuart Wilkin

No.	Pos.	Nation	Player
23	DF	NZL	Dane Ingham
25	GK	MAS	Mohd Azlizan Mohd Azlan
27	FW	MAS	Maxsius Musa
28	FW	MAS	Darren Lok
30	FW	MAS	Shahrol Nizam Abd Rahman
31	GK	MAS	Damien Lim
33	DF	MAS	Dominic Tan
34	DF	MAS	Ritchie Svenson
35	MF	MAS	Muhammad Faheed Naqqeu Ishak
36	GK	MAS	Amir Jef Anjam
50	FW	MAS	Azhad Harraz
70	MF	MAS	Fakrul Iman
72	DF	MAS	Harith Naem
76	DF	MAS	Rozacklye Yanam
88	MF	MAS	Rusdi Roslan

== Transfers ==
=== Players in ===
Preseason

Position	Player	From
FW	(Malaysia) Maxsius Musa	(Malaysia) Free Agent
DF	(New Zealand) Dane Ingham	(Australia) Newcastle Jets
MF	(Australia) Dean Pelekanos	(Australia) Western Sydney Wanderers
FW	(Bosnia and Herzegovina) Ajdin Mujagić	(Croatia) BSK Bijelo Brdo
FW	(Malaysia) Fergus Tierney	(Malaysia) Johor Darul Ta'zim II

=== Players out ===
Preseason

Position	Player	To
DF	(Malaysia) Hanafie Tokyo	(Malaysia) Immigration
DF	(South Korea) Park Tae-soo	(Malaysia) PDRM
MF	(Portugal) Telmo Castanheira	(Indonesia) Persik Kediri
MF	(Malaysia) Hamran Peter	
DF	(Greece) Haris Stamboulidis	
MF	(Malaysia) Danial Haqim	
MF	(Malaysia) Nureizkhan Isa	
DF	(South Korea) Ko Kwang-min	
DF	(Malaysia) Ummareng Bacok	
MF	(Malaysia) Sahrizan Saidin	
FW	(Indonesia) Saddil Ramdani	(Indonesia) Persib Bandung
MF	(Malaysia) Irfan Fazail	(Malaysia) PDRM

== Friendly matches ==
Win Draw Loss

26 July 2025	Sabah (Malaysia)	3–1	(Brunei) DPMM	Kota Kinabalu
20:00 MYT	Ting 12'; Cifu 31'; Ting 72'		53'	Stadium: Likas Stadium; Attendance: 1,583

== Competitions ==
=== Overview ===
Competition	First match	Last match	Starting round	Final position	Record							
Competition	First match	Last match	Starting round	Final position	Pld	W	D	L	GF	GA	GD	Win %
Malaysia Super League	13 August 2025	15 May 2026	Matchday 1	9th	24	5	8	11	29	44	−15	20.83
Malaysia FA Cup	17 August 2025	14 December 2025	Round of 16	Runners-up	7	3	3	1	16	12	+4	42.86
Malaysia Cup	17 January 2026	22 January 2026	Round of 16	Round of 16	2	0	1	1	2	5	−3	0.00
MFL Challenge Cup	8 February 2026	19 April 2026	Quarter-finals	Winners	6	2	4	0	5	2	+3	33.33
Total					39	10	16	13	52	63	−11	25.64

Source: Competitions

=== Malaysia Super League ===
==== League table ====
Pos	Team	Pld	W	D	L	GF	GA	GD	Pts	Qualification or relegation
7	Negeri Sembilan	24	6	11	7	39	35	+4	29	
8	Penang	24	6	7	11	26	41	−15	25	
9	Sabah	24	5	8	11	29	44	−15	23	
10	DPMM	24	6	5	13	30	57	−27	23	Ineligible for AFC competition spots
11	Melaka	24	4	7	13	18	45	−27	19	

Updated to match(es) played on 17 May 2026. Source: Malaysian Football League
Rules for classification: 1) Points; 2) Goal difference; 3) Number of goals scored.

==== Results summary ====
Overall								Home						Away					
Pld	W	D	L	GF	GA	GD	Pts	W	D	L	GF	GA	GD	W	D	L	GF	GA	GD
3	0	3	0	2	2	0	3	0	2	0	1	1	0	0	1	0	1	1	0

Source: FAM-CMS

==== Results by round ====
Round	1	2	3	4	5	6	7	8	9	10	11	12	13	14	15	16	17	18	19	20	21	22	23	24	25	26
Ground	A	H	H^{LS1}	-	A	A	H	A	H	H	A	H	A	A	H	A	-	H	H	A	H	A	A	H	A	H
Result	D	D	D	-													-									
Position	8	9	9	9																						

Source: FAM Notes:
A = Away; H = Home; W = Win; D = Draw; L = Loss; - = No Match

==== Fixtures and results ====
The league fixtures were announced on 9 July 2025.

As of 29 August 2025

Win Draw Loss

29 August 2025 LS1	Sabah	1–1	Melaka	Kota Kinabalu
20:15 MYT	Gary (yellow card) 27'; Tan (yellow card) 54'; Mujagić 61'; Rawilson (yellow card) 90+2'	Report	Nasir (yellow card) 54'; Irfan 61'	Stadium: Likas Stadium; Attendance: 4,028; Referee: S. Logeswaran; Man of the Match: Irfan Zakaria (Melaka)

13 August 2025 LS2	Kuala Lumpur City	1-1	Sabah	Cheras
21:00 MYT	Gallifuoco (yellow card) 46'; Ingham 65' (o.g.); Kamal Azizi (yellow card) 73'	Report	Ting (yellow card) 18'; Pelekanos (red card) 43'; Peres 90+2'	Stadium: Kuala Lumpur Stadium; Attendance: 1,838; Referee: Mohammad Zamzaidi bin Katimin; Man of the Match: Gabriel Peres (Sabah)

23 August 2025 LS3	Sabah	0-0	Kelantan The Real Warriors	Kota Kinabalu
20:15 MYT		Report	Sean (yellow card) 2'; Danial (yellow card) 90+4'	Stadium: Likas Stadium; Attendance: 6,438; Referee: Ahmad Zuhadi Dzulkifli; Man of the Match: Daniel Ting (Sabah)

21 September 2025 LS5	Johor Darul Ta'zim	8-0	Sabah	Iskandar Puteri
20:15 MYT				Stadium: Sultan Ibrahim Stadium

27 September 2025 LS6	Negeri Sembilan	v	Sabah	Seremban
21:00 MYT				Stadium: Tuanku Abdul Rahman Stadium

4 October 2025 LS7	Sabah	v	Kuching City	Kota Kinabalu
20:15 MYT				Stadium: Likas Stadium

26 October 2025 LS8	Immigration	v	Sabah	Batu Kawan
17:00 MYT				Stadium: Penang State Stadium

1 November 2025 LS9	Sabah	v	Selangor	Kota Kinabalu
19:30 MYT				Stadium: Likas Stadium

23 November 2025 LS10	Sabah	v	Penang	Kota Kinabalu
19:30 MYT				Stadium: Likas Stadium

6 December 2025 LS11	PDRM	v	Sabah	Selayang
17:00 MYT				Stadium: Selayang Stadium

20 December 2025 LS12	Sabah	v	(Brunei) DPMM	Kota Kinabalu
19:30 MYT				Stadium: Likas Stadium

23 December 2025 LS13	Terengganu	v	Sabah	Kuala Nerus
21:00 MYT				Stadium: Sultan Mizan Zainal Abidin Stadium

3 January 2026 LS14	Melaka	v	Sabah	Krubong
17:15 MYT				Stadium: Hang Jebat Stadium

9 January 2026 LS15	Sabah	v	Kuala Lumpur City	Kota Kinabalu
20:15 MYT				Stadium: Likas Stadium

13 January 2026 LS16	Kelantan The Real Warriors	v	Sabah	Kota Bharu
21:00 MYT				Stadium: Sultan Muhammad IV Stadium

22 February 2026 LS18	Sabah	v	Johor Darul Ta'zim	Kota Kinabalu
21:15 MYT				Stadium: Likas Stadium

28 February 2026 LS19	Sabah	v	Negeri Sembilan	Kota Kinabalu
21:15 MYT				Stadium: Likas Stadium

7 March 2026 LS20	Kuching City	v	Sabah	Kuching
21:15 MYT				Stadium: Sarawak State Stadium

14 March 2026 LS21	Sabah	v	Immigration	Kota Kinabalu
21:15 MYT				Stadium: Likas Stadium

11 April 2026 LS22	Selangor	v	Sabah	Petaling Jaya
21:00 MYT				Stadium: MBPJ Stadium

26 April 2026 LS23	Penang	v	Sabah	George Town
20:15 MYT				Stadium: City Stadium

2 May 2026 LS24	Sabah	v	PDRM	Kota Kinabalu
19:30 MYT				Stadium: Likas Stadium

9 May 2026 LS25	DPMM (Brunei)	v	Sabah	Bandar Seri Begawan
20:15 MYT				Stadium: Hassanal Bolkiah National Stadium

15-17 May 2026 LS26	Sabah	v	Terengganu	Kota Kinabalu
TBC MYT				Stadium: Likas Stadium

=== FA Cup ===
==== Fixtures and Results ====
The draw for the 2025 Malaysia FA Cup was held on 28 July 2025.
The schedule was later announced on 28 July 2025. Win Draw Loss

Round of 16

17 August 2025 First leg	Bunga Raya	0–6	Sabah	Seremban
16:45 MYT	Ilham (yellow card) 45'; Vimal (yellow card) 87'; Fahmi (yellow card) 90'	Report	Lok 10', 48', 53' (pen.); Tierney 19'; Jafri 45+1' (pen.); Mujagić 81' (pen.)	Stadium: Tuanku Abdul Rahman Stadium; Attendance: 90; Referee: Ahmad Zuhadi Dzulkifli; Man of the Match: Darren Lok (Sabah)

30 September 2025 Second leg	Sabah	0–0 (6-0 agg.)	Bunga Raya	Seremban
16:45 MYT		Report		Stadium: Tuanku Abdul Rahman Stadium; Attendance: 106; Referee: Faisal Ridzuan

Quarter-finals

17 October 2025 First leg	Kelantan TRW	1–2	Sabah	Kota Bahru
21:00 MYT	A. Sesay 17'	Report	Jafri 13'; Mujagić 44'	Stadium: Sultan Muhammad IV Stadium; Referee: Usaid Jamal

29 October 2025 Second leg	Sabah	3–1 (5-2 agg.)	Kelantan TRW	Kota Kinabalu
20:15 MYT	Mujagić 10', 21', 56' (pen.)	Report	Lyngbø 45+2'	Stadium: Likas Stadium; Referee: Zamzaidi Katimin

Semi-finals

9 November 2025 First leg	Sabah	2–2	Selangor	Kota Kinabalu
20:15 MYT	Mujagić 13', 90+1'	Report	Ingham 65' (o.g.); Laine 80'	Stadium: Likas Stadium; Referee: Nazmi Nasaruddin

30 November 2025 Second leg	Selangor	3–3 (a.e.t.) (5-5 agg.) (4–5 p)	Sabah	Petaling Jaya
21:00 MYT	Faisal 33', 73'; Chrigor 51'	Report	Ingham 47'; Mujagić 62', 88' (pen.)	Stadium: Petaling Jaya Stadium; Referee: Hasrol Amir
	Penalties
	Lira (penalty scored); Noor (penalty scored); Izwan (penalty scored); Mukhairi (penalty scored); Harith (penalty missed); Abualnadi (penalty missed)		(penalty missed) Mujagić; (penalty scored) Lok; (penalty scored) Wilkin; (penalty scored) Ting; (penalty scored) Dinesh; (penalty scored) Ingham

Final

14 December 2025 Final	Johor Darul Ta'zim	5–0	Sabah	Kuala Lumpur
21:00 MYT	J. Silva 8'; Rawilson 20' (o.g.); Jairo 23'; Arribas 64'; Hidalgo 90+2'	Report		Stadium: Bukit Jalil National Stadium; Attendance: 40,044; Referee: Kamil Zakaria

== Statistics ==
=== Top scorers ===
As of 29 August 2025

Rank	Player	Super League	FA Cup	Malaysia Cup	Total
1	(Malaysia) Darren Lok	0	3	0	3
2	(Bosnia and Herzegovina) Ajdin Mujagić	1	1	0	2
3	(Brazil) Gabriel Peres	1	0	0	1
3	(Malaysia) Fergus Tierney	0	1	0	1
3	(Malaysia) Jafri Firdaus Chew	0	1	0	1
Total		2	6	0	8

=== Assists ===
As of 29 August 2025

Rank	Player	Super League	FA Cup	Malaysia Cup	Total
1	(Malaysia) Stuart Wilkin	1	1	0	2
2	(Malaysia) Daniel Ting	0	1	0	1
2	(Malaysia) Darren Lok	0	1	0	1
2	(Malaysia) Jafri Firdaus Chew	1	0	0	1
Total		2	3	0	5

=== Clean sheets ===
As of 29 August 2025

Rank	Player	Super League	FA Cup	Malaysia Cup	Total
1	(Malaysia) Damien Lim	1	1	0	2
	(Malaysia) Khairul Fahmi Che Mat	0	0	0	0
	(Malaysia) Mohd Azlizan Mohd Azlan	0	0	0	0
	(Malaysia) Ramzi Mustakim	0	0	0	0
Total		1	1	0	2

=== Squad statistics ===
As of 29 August 2025

Appearances (Apps.) numbers are for appearances in competitive games only including sub appearances.
Red card numbers denote: Numbers in parentheses represent red cards overturned for wrongful dismissal.

No.	Nat.	Player	Pos.	Super League				FA Cup				Malaysia Cup				Total			
No.	Nat.	Player	Pos.	Apps	Goal	Booked	Sent off (straight red)	Apps	Goal	Booked	Sent off (straight red)	Apps	Goal	Booked	Sent off (straight red)	Apps	Goal	Booked	Sent off (straight red)
1	(Malaysia)	Ramzi Mustakim	GK																
3	(Malaysia)	Rawilson Batuil	DF	3		1		1								4		1	
4	(Brazil)	Gabriel Peres	DF	3	1			1								4	1		
5	(Malaysia)	Daniel Ting	DF	3		1		1								4		1	
8	(Malaysia)	Farhan Roslan	MF	3				1								4			
10	(Spain)	Cifu	MF	2				1								3			
11	(Malaysia)	Jafri Firdaus Chew	FW	3				1	1							4	1		
12	(Malaysia)	Kumaahran Sathasivam	FW	1												1			
13	(Malaysia)	Dinesh Rajasingam	DF	1												1			
14	(Australia)	Dean Pelekanos	MF	1			1	1								2			1
15	(Malaysia)	Fergus Tierney	FW	3				1	1							4	1		
19	(Malaysia)	Khairul Fahmi Che Mat	GK																
20	(Malaysia)	Gary Steven Robbat	MF	3		1		1								4		1	
21	(Bosnia and Herzegovina)	Ajdin Mujagić	FW	2				1	1							3	1		
22	(Malaysia)	Stuart Wilkin	MF	2				1								3			
23	(New Zealand)	Dane Ingham	DF	3				1								4			
25	(Malaysia)	Mohd Azlizan Mohd Azlan	GK																
27	(Malaysia)	Maxsius Musa	FW																
28	(Malaysia)	Darren Lok	FW	2				1	3							3	3		
30	(Malaysia)	Shahrol Nizam Abd Rahman	FW																
31	(Malaysia)	Damien Lim	GK	3				1								4			
33	(Malaysia)	Dominic Tan	DF	3				1								4			
34	(Malaysia)	Ritchie Svenson	DF																
35	(Malaysia)	Muhammad Faheed Naqqeu Ishak	MF																
36	(Malaysia)	Amir Jef Anjam	GK																
50	(Malaysia)	Azhad Harraz	FW	3				1								4			
70	(Malaysia)	Fakrul Iman	MF																
72	(Malaysia)	Harith Naem	DF																
76	(Malaysia)	Rozacklye Yanam	DF																
88	(Malaysia)	Rusdi Roslan	MF																
Own goals					0				0				0				0		
Totals					2	4	1		6	0	0		0	0	0		8	4	1

† Player left the club during the season.
