= 2024–25 Sabah F.C. season =

2024–25 Season for Sabah FC (Malaysia)

Sabah
2024–25 season
- Owner: Sabah Football Club Sdn Bhd
- Manager: Ong Kim Swee (until 30 November); Alto Linus (interim; 30 November – 10 December); Martin Stano (from 10 December)
- Stadium: Likas Stadium
- Malaysia Super League: 3rd
- Malaysia FA Cup: Quarter-Finals
- Malaysia Cup: Semi-Finals
- Top goalscorer: League: 7 goals João Pedro; All: 8 goals João Pedro
- Highest home attendance: 11,569 vs Johor Darul Ta'zim (League); 3,900 vs Kuala Lumpur Rovers (FA Cup)
- Lowest home attendance: 3,154 vs Negeri Sembilan (League); 3,834 vs Terengganu (FA Cup)
- Average home league attendance: 4,617 (League); 3,867 (FA Cup); 8,964 (Malaysia Cup)
- Biggest win: Penang 0-4 Sabah (League); Sabah 7-0 Kuala Lumpur Rovers (FA Cup); PT Athletic 0-4 Sabah (Malaysia Cup)
- Biggest defeat: Johor Darul Ta'zim 4-0 Sabah (League); Terengganu 4-0 Sabah (FA Cup)
Home colours

The 2024–25 season is Sabah's ninth competitive season in the highest tier of Malaysian football since the foundation of Malaysia Super League in 2004, and the club's fifth consecutive in the Malaysia Super League.

== Squad ==
As of 22 September 2024

Note: Flags indicate national team as defined under FIFA eligibility rules; some limited exceptions apply. Players may hold more than one non-FIFA nationality.

No.	Pos.	Nation	Player
1	GK	MAS	Ramzi Mustakim
2	DF	MAS	Hanafie Tokyo
3	DF	MAS	Rawilson Batuil
4	DF	BRA	Gabriel Peres
5	DF	MAS	Daniel Ting
6	DF	KOR	Park Tae-soo (captain)
7	MF	ESP	Cifu
8	MF	MAS	Farhan Roslan
9	FW	BRA	João Pedro
10	MF	POR	Telmo Castanheira
11	FW	MAS	Jafri Firdaus Chew
12	FW	MAS	Kumaahran Sathasivam
13	DF	MAS	Dinesh Rajasingam
17	MF	MAS	Hamran Peter
18	DF	GRE	Haris Stamboulidis
19	GK	MAS	Khairul Fahmi Che Mat
20	MF	MAS	Gary Steven Robbat

No.	Pos.	Nation	Player
21	MF	MAS	Danial Haqim
22	MF	MAS	Stuart Wilkin
24	MF	MAS	Nureizkhan Isa
27	DF	KOR	Ko Kwang-min
28	FW	MAS	Darren Lok
29	DF	MAS	Ummareng Bacok
30	MF	MAS	Shahrol Nizam Abd Rahman
31	GK	MAS	Damien Lim
33	DF	MAS	Dominic Tan
40	MF	MAS	Sahrizan Saidin
48	MF	MAS	Syukri Baharun
50	FW	MAS	Azhad Harraz
66	MF	MAS	Rozaimi Abdul Rahman
67	FW	IDN	Saddil Ramdani
72	FW	MAS	Harith Naem
77	MF	MAS	Irfan Fazail
88	MF	MAS	Rusdi Roslan

== Transfers ==
=== Players in ===
Preseason

Position	Player	From
FW	(Malaysia) Harith Naem	(Malaysia) Perak
DF	(Greece) Haris Stamboulidis	(Spain) Mar Menor

Mid-season

Position	Player	From
FW	(Brazil) João Pedro	(Vietnam) The Cong-Viettel

=== Players out ===
Preseason

Position	Player	To
FW	(Malaysia) Amri Yahyah	(Malaysia) PT Athletic
DF	(Malaysia) Rizal Ghazali	(Malaysia) Kedah Darul Aman
DF	(Malaysia) Irfan Zakaria	(Malaysia) Kedah Darul Aman

Mid-season

Position	Player	To
FW	(Brazil) Ramon	(Azerbaijan) Araz-Naxçıvan

== Friendly matches ==
Win Draw Loss

=== SMJ Cup 2024 ===
Pos	Team	Pld	W	D	L	GF	GA	GD	Pts	Qualification
1	(Malaysia) Kuala Lumpur City	3	2	1	0	4	1	+3	7	Advance to Final
2	(Malaysia) Sabah	3	1	2	0	2	1	+1	5	Advance to Final
3	(Malaysia) Kuching City	3	1	1	1	2	3	−1	4	Advance to 3rd Place Play-off
4	(Singapore) Hougang United	3	0	0	3	1	4	−3	0	Advance to 3rd Place Play-off

Updated to match(es) played on 3 May 2024. Source: Sabah FC Facebook Page
Rules for classification: 1) Points; 2) Goal difference; 3) Number of goals scored.

29 April 2024 Matchday 1	Sabah (Malaysia)	2–1	(Singapore) Hougang United	Kota Kinabalu
20:00 MYT	Wilkin 54'; Saddil 74'		Plazonja 70' (pen.)	Stadium: Likas Stadium

1 May 2024 Matchday 2	Sabah (Malaysia)	0–0	(Malaysia) Kuala Lumpur City	Kota Kinabalu
20:00 MYT				Stadium: Likas Stadium

3 May 2024 Matchday 3	Sabah (Malaysia)	0–0	(Malaysia) Kuching City	Kota Kinabalu
20:00 MYT				Stadium: Likas Stadium

5 May 2024 Final	Kuala Lumpur City (Malaysia)	0–1	(Malaysia) Sabah	Kota Kinabalu
20:00 MYT			Ramon 63' (pen.)	Stadium: Likas Stadium

=== RCTI Premium Sports ===
30 May 2024	Selangor (Malaysia)	3–2	(Malaysia) Sabah	Jakarta, Indonesia
17:00 WIB	Allif H. 45'; Park 45+2' (o.g.); Orozco 69'		Jafri 61'; Saddil 62'	Stadium: Jakarta International Stadium

2 June 2024 3rd Place	Sabah (Malaysia)	2–1	(Indonesia) PSIS Semarang	Jakarta, Indonesia
17:00 WIB	Jafri 39'; Irfan 80'		Habil 61'	Stadium: Jakarta International Stadium

== Competitions ==
=== Overview ===
Competition	First match	Last match	Starting round	Final position	Record							
Competition	First match	Last match	Starting round	Final position	Pld	W	D	L	GF	GA	GD	Win %
Super League	12 May 2024	20 April 2025	LS1	3rd	24	11	7	6	41	33	+8	45.83
FA Cup	15 June 2024	6 July 2024	Round of 16	Quarter-final	3	1	0	2	7	7	+0	33.33
Malaysia Cup	23 November 2024	2 February 2025	Round of 16	Semi-final	6	3	2	1	10	3	+7	50.00
Total					33	15	9	9	58	43	+15	45.45

Last updated: 8 April 2025
Source: FAM-CMS

=== Malaysia Super League ===
==== League table ====
Pos	Team	Pld	W	D	L	GF	GA	GD	Pts	Qualification or relegation
1	Johor Darul Ta'zim (C)	24	23	1	0	90	8	+82	70	Qualification for the AFC Champions League Elite league stage & ASEAN Club Championship
2	Selangor	24	16	4	4	44	16	+28	52	Qualification for the AFC Champions League Two group stage & ASEAN Club Championship (Note: Since the winners of the 2024 Malaysia FA Cup (Johor Darul Ta'zim) qualified for AFC competition based on their league positions, the berth is awarded to the 2nd-placed team in the league.)
3	Sabah	24	11	7	6	41	33	+8	40	
4	Kuching City	24	10	9	5	38	28	+10	39	
5	Terengganu	24	9	8	7	35	26	+9	35	

Source: MFL
Rules for classification: 1) Points; 2) Goal difference; 3) Goals scored;
(C) Champions

==== Results summary ====
Overall								Home						Away					
Pld	W	D	L	GF	GA	GD	Pts	W	D	L	GF	GA	GD	W	D	L	GF	GA	GD
24	11	7	6	41	33	+8	40	5	4	3	20	14	+6	6	3	3	21	19	+2

Source: FAM-CMS

==== Results by round ====
Round	1	2	3	4	5	6	7	8	9	10	11	12	13	14	15	16	17	18	19	20	21	22	23	24	25	26
Ground	H	A	H	-	H	H	A	A	H	H	A	H	A	A	H	A	-	A	A	H	H	A	A	H	A	H
Result	D	W	W	-	L	W	L	W	L	D	L	W	W	W	W	W	-	L	W	D	D	D	D	W	W	L
Position	6	3	3	4	5	3	5	4	5	4	5	4	3	3	3	3	3	3	3	3	3	3	4	3	3	3

Source: FAM Notes:
A = Away; H = Home; W = Win; D = Draw; L = Loss; - = No Match

==== Fixtures and Results ====
The league fixtures were announced on 9 April 2024.

As of 8 April 2025

Win Draw Loss

12 May 2024 LS1	Sabah	0–0	Penang	Kota Kinabalu
17:45 MYT	Jafri (yellow card) 88'	Report	Rahmat (yellow card) 90'	Stadium: Likas Stadium; Attendance: 3,708; Referee: Mohammad Zamzaidi bin Katimin; Man of the Match: Rafael Vitor (Penang)

17 May 2024 LS2	Kelantan Darul Naim	2–3	Sabah	Kota Bharu
21:00 MYT	Kim 55'; Jeřábek (yellow card) 75'; Bae 90+1'	Report	Peres 25'; Wilkin 63'; Ramon 69'; Ting (yellow card) 73'	Stadium: Sultan Muhammad IV Stadium; Attendance: 7,778; Referee: Muhammad Khairulsyahmi bin Ahmad Khalidi; Man of the Match: Khairul Fahmi Che Mat (Sabah)

25 May 2024 LS3	Sabah	2–1	Kuching City	Kota Kinabalu
20:15 MYT	Park (yellow card) 45+3'; Lok 75' (pen.); Jafri 85'; Ko (yellow card) 98'	Report	Wan Azraie (yellow card) 49'; Pedro 64'; Pedro (yellow card) 64'; Mintah (yellow card) 74'; Okwuosa (yellow card) 74'	Stadium: Likas Stadium; Attendance: 5,141; Referee: Ahmad Zuhadi Dzulkifli; Man of the Match: Darren Lok (Sabah)

13 July 2024 LS5	Sabah	1–3	Johor Darul Ta'zim	Kota Kinabalu
20:15 MYT	Peres 52'; Rawilson (yellow card) 90+5'	Report	Morales 21', 44'; Davies (yellow card) 49'; Bergson (yellow card) 77'; Bergson 90+5' (pen.)	Stadium: Likas Stadium; Attendance: 11,569; Referee: Razlan bin Joffri Ali; Man of the Match: Romel Morales (Johor Darul Ta'zim)

25 July 2024 LS6	Sabah	2–0	Negeri Sembilan	Kota Kinabalu
20:15 MYT	Ting 14'; Jafri 81' (pen.); Kumaahran (yellow card) 26'; Park (yellow card) 77'; Stamboulidis (yellow card) 90+3'; Harith (yellow card) 90+5'	Report	Norfiqrie (red card) 64'; Izzuddin (yellow card) 90+3'	Stadium: Likas Stadium; Attendance: 3,154; Referee: Mohamad Kamil Zakaria bin Ismail; Man of the Match: Cifu (Sabah)

31 July 2024 LS7	Kuala Lumpur City	3–0	Sabah	Cheras
20:15 MYT	Gan (yellow card) 35'; Gallifuoco (yellow card) 45+1'; Ko 45+5' (o.g.); Josué 61'; Zhafri 87'; Amirul (yellow card) 90+2'	Report	Rawilson (red card) 44'	Stadium: Kuala Lumpur Stadium; Attendance: 1,029; Referee: Suhaizi Shukri; Man of the Match: Paulo Josué (Kuala Lumpur City)

9 August 2024 LS8	Sri Pahang	2–3	Sabah	Temerloh
21:00 MYT	Sherman 6', 48'; Sherman (yellow card) 68'; Hidalgo (yellow card) 71'; Agüero (yellow card) 78'; Azwan (yellow card) 90+3'	Report	Jafri 18'; Farhan 26'; Ting 35'; Gary (yellow card) 38'; Danial (yellow card) 90+5'; Telmo (yellow card) 90+6'	Stadium: Temerloh Mini Stadium; Attendance: 1,656; Referee: Mohamad Kamil Zakaria bin Ismail; Man of the Match: Khairul Fahmi Che Mat (Sabah)

13 August 2024 LS9	Sabah	1–2	Selangor	Kota Kinabalu
20:15 MYT	Safuwan 27' (o.g.)	Report	Fernández (yellow card) 29'; Fernández 31'; Harith 87'	Stadium: Likas Stadium; Attendance: 4,652; Referee: Mohammad Zamzaidi bin Katimin; Man of the Match: Rawilson Batuil (Sabah)

15 September 2024 LS10	Sabah	1–1	Terengganu	Kota Kinabalu
20:15 MYT	João 11'; Lok (yellow card) 85'	Report	Akinade 45+1'; Tukhtasinov (yellow card) 61'	Stadium: Likas Stadium; Attendance: 5,602; Referee: Ahmad Zuhadi Dzulkifli; Man of the Match: Suhaimi Husin (Terengganu)

21 September 2024 LS11	PDRM	1–0	Sabah	Selayang
17:30 MYT	Badrul (yellow card) 37'; Ifedayo 80'	Report	Ting (yellow card) 37'; Telmo (yellow card) 45+1'; Rawilson (yellow card) 57'	Stadium: Selayang Stadium; Attendance: 416; Referee: Muhammad Usaid bin Jamal; Man of the Match: Bryan See (PDRM)

29 September 2024 LS12	Sabah	5–2	Kedah Darul Aman	Kota Kinabalu
17:45 MYT	Saddil 3' (pen.); João 48', 68'; Peres (yellow card) 74'; Kumaahran 84'; Gary 90+4'	Report	Cleylton 45+3'; Gordic 65'; Hasbullah (yellow card) 76'	Stadium: Likas Stadium; Attendance: 5,006; Referee: Ahmad Zuhadi Dzulkifli; Man of the Match: Cifu (Sabah)

19 October 2024 LS13	Perak	2–4	Sabah	Ipoh
17:00 MYT	Guaycochea 30' (pen.); Clayton 49'; Tommy (yellow card) 61'; Sunday (yellow card) 79'	Report	Ko 39'; Wilkin 44'; Saddil (yellow card) 58'; João 83'; Cifu 88'	Stadium: Perak Stadium; Attendance: 2,531; Referee: Mohd Hasrol bin Mohd Amir; Man of the Match: Stuart Wilkin (Sabah)

25 October 2024 LS14	Penang	0–4	Sabah	George Town
20:15 MYT	Fairuz (yellow card) 20'; Ankrah (yellow card) 31'; Adib (yellow card) 69'	Report	Saddil 2'; Peres 6'; Wilkin 35'; Tan 50'; Lim (yellow card) 77'	Stadium: City Stadium; Attendance: 1,187; Referee: Mohammad Zamzaidi bin Katim; Man of the Match: Dominic Tan (Sabah)

3 November 2024 LS15	Sabah	4–1	Kelantan Darul Naim	Kota Kinabalu
18:45 MYT	João 17', 45'; Farhan 28'; Peres 60'	Report	Fazrul 27'; Jeřábek (yellow card) 58'	Stadium: Likas Stadium; Attendance: 4,922; Referee: Muhammad Khairulsyahmi bin Ahmad Khaidi; Man of the Match: João Pedro (Sabah)

4 December 2024 LS16	Kuching City	1–2	Sabah	Kuching
19:30 MYT	Zahrul 82'; Zahrul (yellow card) 90'	Report	Saddil (yellow card) 27'; Telmo (yellow card) 48'; Saddil 66'; Ting (yellow card) 73'; Peres 86'; Peres (yellow card) 86' (yellow-red card) 90+5'; Jafri (yellow card) 90+3'	Stadium: Sarawak State Stadium; Attendance: 2,010; Referee: Muhammad Khairulsyahmi bin Ahmad Khalidi; Man of the Match: Dominic Tan (Sabah)

11 January 2025 LS18	Johor Darul Ta'zim	4–0	Sabah	Iskandar Puteri
20:15 MYT	Muñiz 51', 69'; Afiq (yellow card) 53'; Bergson 79', 83'	Report	Gary (yellow card) 19'; Tan (yellow card) 39'; João (yellow card) 58'	Stadium: Sultan Ibrahim Stadium; Attendance: 11,363; Referee: Mohd Hasrol bin Mohd Amir; Man of the Match: Juan Muñiz (Johor Darul Ta'zim)

25 January 2025 LS19	Negeri Sembilan	1 –2	Sabah	Seremban
17:30 MYT	Hein 5'		Saddil 5'; Ting (yellow card) 40'; Tan (yellow card) 48'; Pedro 72'	Stadium: Tuanku Abdul Rahman Stadium; Attendance: 537; Referee: Muhammad Usaid bin Jamal; Man of the Match: Damien Lim (Sabah)

21 February 2025 LS20	Sabah	1–1	Kuala Lumpur City	Kota Kinabalu
19:15 MYT	Kumaahran 7'; Castanheira (yellow card) 85'	Report	Haqimi 81'; Haqimi (yellow card) 87'	Stadium: Likas Stadium; Attendance: 1,799; Referee: Mohamad Faizudin bin Ismail; Man of the Match: Paulo Josué (Kuala Lumpur City)

16 February 2025 LS21	Sabah	2–2	Sri Pahang	Kota Kinabalu
20:15 MYT	Lok 21' (pen.), 61' (pen.); Saddil (yellow card) 48'; Castanheira (yellow card) 79'; Rawilson (yellow card) 89'	Report	Adam 25'; Baqiuddin (yellow card) 37'; Sherman 44'; Sherman (yellow card) 63'	Stadium: Likas Stadium; Attendance: 2,186; Referee: Muhammad Khairulsyahmi bin Ahmad Khalidi; Man of the Match: Cifu (Sabah)

27 February 2025 LS22	Selangor	0–0	Sabah	Petaling Jaya
21:00 MYT	Sharul (yellow card) 13'; Fernández (yellow card) 45'; Safuwan (yellow card) 75'	Report	Saddil (yellow card) 43'; Dinesh (yellow card) 76'	Stadium: Petaling Jaya Stadium; Attendance: 2,525; Referee: Suhaizi Shukri; Man of the Match: Kalamullah Al-Hafiz (Selangor)

7 March 2025 LS23	Terengganu	2–2	Sabah	Kuala Nerus
22:00 MYT	Akinade 24'; Safawi 84'; Bonilla (yellow card) 14'; Hairiey (yellow card) 86'; Tukhtasinov (yellow card) 89'	Report	Wilkin 20'; Saddil 44'; Kumaahran (yellow card) 12'; Rawilson (yellow card) 42'; Saddil (yellow card) 45+1'; Lim (yellow card) 69'; Ting (yellow card) 88'; Farhan (yellow card) 89'	Stadium: Sultan Mizan Zainal Abidin Stadium; Attendance: 1,483; Referee: Ahmad Zuhadi Dzulkifli; Man of the Match: Safawi Rasid (Terengganu)

5 April 2025 LS24	Sabah	1–0	PDRM	Kota Kinabalu
19:15 MYT	Tan 42'; Ting (yellow card) 44'; Jafri (yellow card) 90+1'; Park (yellow card) 90+3'; Saddil (yellow card) 90+5'	Report	Alif (yellow card) 87'; Hadi (yellow card) 89'	Stadium: Likas Stadium; Attendance: 2,220; Referee: Muhammad Izzul Fikri bin Kamaruzaman; Man of the Match: Damien Lim (Sabah)

12 April 2025 LS25	Kedah Darul Aman	1-1	Sabah	Alor Setar
21:00 MYT	Amirul 16' (pen.)	Report	Lok 62'	Stadium: Darul Aman Stadium; Attendance: 1,699; Referee: Muhammad Nazmi bin Nasaruddin; Man of the Match: Darren Lok (Sabah)

20 April 2025 LS26	Sabah	0-1	Perak	Kota Kinabalu
21:00 MYT		Report	Rawilson 29' (o.g.)	Stadium: Likas Stadium; Attendance: 2,892; Referee: Muhammad Khairulsyahmi bin Ahmad Khalidi; Man of the Match: Luciano Guaycochea (Perak)

=== FA Cup ===
==== Fixtures and Results ====
The draw for the 2024 Malaysia FA Cup was held on 16 May 2024.
The schedule was later announced on 24 May 2024.

Win Draw Loss

15 June 2024 R16	Sabah	7-0	Kuala Lumpur Rovers	Kota Kinabalu
20:15 MYT	Saddil 17'; Ramon 28', 45', 59'; Kumaahran (yellow card) 39'; Park 51'; Jafri 73'; Raffi 90+3' (o.g.)	Report	Amirul (yellow card) 45+3'; Zahril (yellow card) 90+4'	Stadium: Likas Stadium; Attendance: 3,900; Referee: Muhammad Shukor bin Zulkiflee; Man of the Match: Ramon (Sabah)

Sabah won 7–0.

28 June 2024 Quarter-finals (Leg 1)	Terengganu	4-0	Sabah	Kuala Nerus
21:00 MYT	Ott 9'; Akinade 37', 45+3'; Pilj 42'; Akhyar (yellow card) 28'; Akinade (yellow card) 32'; Alif (yellow card) 53'; Safwan (yellow card) 76'	Report	Castanheira (yellow card) 26'; Peres (yellow card) 87'	Stadium: Sultan Mizan Zainal Abidin Stadium; Attendance: 15,677; Referee: Mohd Hasrol bin Mohd Amir; Man of the Match: Nurillo Tukhtasinov (Terengganu)

6 July 2024 Quarter-finals (Leg 2)	Sabah	0-3	Terengganu	Kota Kinabalu
19:15 MYT	Jafri (yellow card) 25'; Daniel (yellow card) 75'; Dominic (yellow card) 77'	Report	Safawi 10'; Akhyar 43'; Pilj 88'; Nasrulhaq (yellow card) 77'	Stadium: Likas Stadium; Attendance: 3,834; Referee: Tuan Mohd Yaasin bin Tuan Mohd Hanafiah; Man of the Match: Syed Muhammad Nasrulhaq (Terengganu)

Sabah lost 0–7 on aggregate.

=== Malaysia Cup ===
==== Fixtures and Results ====
The draw for the 2024 Malaysia Cup was held on 11 November 2024.

Win Draw Loss

23 November 2024 Round of 16 (Leg 1)	PT Athletic	0–4	Sabah	Cheras
17:00 MYT	Indra (yellow card) 69'; Dirga (yellow card) 84'; Adam (yellow card) 90+6'	Report	Saddil 13'; Danial 19'; Saddil (yellow card) 68'; Ting 76'; Gary (yellow card) 90+4'; Yusri 90+7' (o.g.)	Stadium: Kuala Lumpur Stadium (Note: PT Athletic played their home matches at Kuala Lumpur Stadium, Cheras, instead of their regular home stadium MMU Stadium, Cyberjaya respectively, which did not meet MFL requirements.); Attendance: 512; Referee: Abang Azharudin Abdullah; Man of the Match: Rawilson Batuil (Sabah)

27 November 2024 Round of 16 (Leg 2)	Sabah	3–0	PT Athletic	Cheras
20:30 MYT	Ting (yellow card) 56'; Gary (yellow card) 62'; Lok 68' (pen.); Wilkin 77'; Pedro 81'	Report	Syakir (yellow card) 45+2'; Khairul (yellow card) 56'; Latiff (yellow card) 67'	Stadium: Kuala Lumpur Stadium (Note: Sabah played their home matches at Kuala Lumpur Stadium, Cheras, instead of their regular home stadium Likas Stadium, Kota Kinabalu.); Attendance: 448; Referee: Ahmad Zuhadi Dzulkifli; Man of the Match: Syakir Danial (PT Athletic)

Sabah won 7–0 on aggregate.

15 December 2024 Quarter-Finals (Leg 1)	Kuching City	0–1	Sabah	Kuching
20:15 MYT	Atede (yellow card) 34'; Okwuosa (yellow card) 57'; Celvin (yellow card) 67'	Report	Saddil (yellow card) 22'; Farhan 32'; Telmo (yellow card) 45+2'; Farhan (yellow card) 58'; Jafri (yellow card) 84'; Ko (yellow card) 90'; Peres (yellow card) 90+1'	Stadium: Sarawak State Stadium; Attendance: 2,430; Referee: Mohammad Zamzaidi bin Katimin; Man of the Match: Wan Azraie (Kuching City)

23 December 2024 Quarter-Finals (Leg 2)	Sabah	0–0	Kuching City	Kota Kinabalu
20:15 MYT	Tan (yellow card) 55'	Report		Stadium: Likas Stadium; Attendance: 7,125; Referee: Suhaizi Shukri; Man of the Match: Damien Lim (Sabah)

Sabah won 1–0 on aggregate.

18 January 2025 Semi-Finals (Leg 1)	Sabah	1–1	Sri Pahang	Kota Kinabalu
20:15 MYT	Wilkin 9'	Report	Azrif (yellow card) 45+2'; Sherman 66'; Hidalgo (red card) 75'; Ahapov (yellow card) 90'	Stadium: Likas Stadium; Attendance: 10,803; Referee: Mohammad Zamzaidi bin Katimin; Man of the Match: Gabriel Peres (Sabah)

2 February 2025 Semi-Finals (Leg 2)	Sri Pahang	2–1 (a.e.t.)	Sabah	Temerloh
20:30 MYT	Brundo (yellow card) 44'; Sherman (yellow card) 72'; Park 72' (o.g.); Sherman 107'		Ting (yellow card) 25'; Peres (yellow card) 51'; Kumaahran 77'; Telmo (yellow card) 120+1'	Stadium: Temerloh Mini Stadium

Sabah lost 2–3 on aggregate.

== Statistics ==
=== Top Scorers ===
As of 20 April 2025

Rank	Player	Super League	FA Cup	Malaysia Cup	Total
1	(Brazil) João Pedro	7	0	1	8
2	(Indonesia) Saddil Ramdani	5	1	1	7
3	(Malaysia) Stuart Wilkin	4	0	2	6
4	(Brazil) Gabriel Peres	5	0	0	5
4	(Malaysia) Darren Lok	4	0	1	5
6	(Malaysia) Jafri Firdaus Chew	3	1	0	4
6	(Brazil) Ramon	1	3	0	4
8	(Malaysia) Daniel Ting	2	0	1	3
8	(Malaysia) Farhan Roslan	2	0	1	3
8	(Malaysia) Kumaahran Sathasivam	2	0	1	3
11	(Malaysia) Dominic Tan	2	0	0	2
12	(Malaysia) Gary Steven Robbat	1	0	0	1
12	(South Korea) Ko Kwang-min	1	0	0	1
12	(Spain) Cifu	1	0	0	1
12	(South Korea) Park Tae-soo	0	1	0	1
12	(Malaysia) Danial Haqim	0	0	1	1
Total		40	6	9	53

=== Clean sheets ===
As of 20 April 2025

Rank	Player	Super League	FA Cup	Malaysia Cup	Total
1	(Malaysia) Damien Lim	3	0	3	6
2	(Malaysia) Khairul Fahmi Che Mat	2	1	1	4
3	(Malaysia) Ramzi Mustakim	0	0	1	1
Total		5	1	5	11

=== Squad statistics ===
As of 20 April 2025

Appearances (Apps.) numbers are for appearances in competitive games only including sub appearances.
Red card numbers denote: Numbers in parentheses represent red cards overturned for wrongful dismissal.

No.	Nat.	Player	Pos.	Super League				FA Cup				Malaysia Cup				Total			
No.	Nat.	Player	Pos.	Apps	Goal	Booked	Sent off (straight red)	Apps	Goal	Booked	Sent off (straight red)	Apps	Goal	Booked	Sent off (straight red)	Apps	Goal	Booked	Sent off (straight red)
1	(Malaysia)	Ramzi Mustakim	GK	1								1				2			
2	(Malaysia)	Hanafie Tokyo	DF	1												1			
3	(Malaysia)	Rawilson Batuil	DF	19		4	1	2				4				24		4	1
4	(Brazil)	Gabriel Peres	DF	12	5	1	1	1		1		5		2		18	5	4	1
5	(Malaysia)	Daniel Ting	DF	21	2	6		3		1		6	1	2		30	3	9	
6	(South Korea)	Park Tae-soo	DF	13		3		3	1			2				18	1	3	
7	(Spain)	Cifu	DF	18	1			1				4				23	1		
8	(Malaysia)	Farhan Roslan	MF	18	2	1						5	1	1		23	3	2	
9	(Brazil)	João Pedro	FW	9	7	1						6	1			15	8	1	
10	(Portugal)	Telmo Castanheira	MF	22		5		3		1		5		2		30		8	
11	(Malaysia)	Jafri Firdaus Chew	FW	20	3	3		3	1	1		4		1		27	4	5	
12	(Malaysia)	Kumaahran Sathasivam	FW	15	2	3		3		1		2	1			20	3	4	
13	(Malaysia)	Dinesh Rajasingam	DF	6		2	1									6		2	1
16	(Brazil)	Ramon †	FW	3	1			3	3							6	4		
17	(Malaysia)	Hamran Peter	MF	1												1			
18	(Greece)	Haris Stamboulidis	DF	7		1		1				2				10		1	
19	(Malaysia)	Khairul Fahmi Che Mat	GK	11				3				1				15			
20	(Malaysia)	Gary Steven Robbat	MF	10	1	2						3		2		13	1	4	
21	(Malaysia)	Danial Haqim	MF	5		1						1	1			6	1	1	
22	(Malaysia)	Stuart Wilkin	MF	20	4			3				5	2			28	6		
24	(Malaysia)	Nureizkhan Isa	MF																
27	(South Korea)	Ko Kwang-min	MF	20	1	1		3				6		1		29	1	2	
28	(Malaysia)	Darren Lok	FW	18	3	1		1				5	1			24	4	1	
29	(Malaysia)	Ummareng Bacok	MF									1				1			
30	(Malaysia)	Shahrol Nizam Abd Rahman	MF																
31	(Malaysia)	Damien Lim	GK	13		2						5				18		2	
33	(Malaysia)	Dominic Tan	DF	22	2	2		3		1		6		1		31	2	4	
40	(Malaysia)	Sahrizan Saidin	MF	5												5			
45	(Malaysia)	Chikonelson Kulisi	MF	3												3			
48	(Malaysia)	Syukri Baharun	MF	1												1			
50	(Malaysia)	Azhad Harraz Arman	FW	9				1								10			
66	(Malaysia)	Rozaimi Abdul Rahman	MF																
67	(Indonesia)	Saddil Ramdani	FW	15	5	6		2	1			2	1	2		19	7	8	
72	(Malaysia)	Harith Naem	FW	6		1		1				2				9		1	
77	(Malaysia)	Irfan Fazail	MF	10				2				4				16			
88	(Malaysia)	Rusdi Roslan	MF					1								1			
Own goals					1				1				1				3		
Totals					41	46	3		7	6	0		10	14	0		58	66	3

† Player left the club during the season.
