= 2023 Sabah F.C. season =

Sabah
2023 season
- Owner: Sabah Football Club Sdn Bhd
- CEO: Ahmad Marzuki Nasir
- Manager: Ong Kim Swee
- Stadium: Likas Stadium
- Malaysia Super League: 3rd
- Malaysia FA Cup: Quarter Finals
- Malaysia Cup: Quarter Finals
- AFC Cup: Zonal Semi Finals
- Top goalscorer: League: 8 goals Ramon; All: 13 goals Darren Lok; Ramon
- Highest home attendance: 15,203 vs Johor Darul Ta'zim (League) 6,797 vs Kuala Lumpur City (FA Cup); 6,216 vs Perak (Malaysia Cup) 7,607 vs (Singapore) Hougang United (AFC Cup)
- Lowest home attendance: 4,885 vs Kuching City (League) 4,500 vs Kelantan United (FA Cup); 6,214 vs Kuching City (Malaysia Cup) 7,441 vs (Vietnam) Haiphong (AFC Cup)
- Average home league attendance: 9,896 (League); 5,649 (FA Cup); 6,215 (Malaysia Cup); 7,524 (AFC Cup)
- Biggest win: Kelantan 0–7 Sabah
- Biggest defeat: Johor Darul Ta'zim 4–0 Sabah; Sabah 1–5 Johor Darul Ta'zim
Home colours	Away colours	Third colours

The 2023 season is Sabah's eighth competitive season in the highest tier of Malaysian football since the foundation of Malaysia Super League in 2004, and the club's fourth consecutive in the Malaysia Super League.

== Squad ==
As of 16 July 2023

Note: Flags indicate national team as defined under FIFA eligibility rules; some limited exceptions apply. Players may hold more than one non-FIFA nationality.

No.	Pos.	Nation	Player
1	GK	MAS	Ramzi Mustakim
3	DF	MAS	Rawilson Batuil
4	DF	BRA	Gabriel Peres
5	DF	MAS	Daniel Ting
6	DF	KOR	Park Tae-Soo (Vice-captain)
8	FW	MAS	Farhan Roslan
9	DF	ESP	Cifu
10	MF	POR	Telmo Castanheira
11	FW	MAS	Jafri Firdaus Chew
12	FW	MAS	Kumaahran Sathasivam
13	DF	MAS	Dinesh Rajasingam
14	DF	MAS	Hanafie Tokyo
15	DF	MAS	Rizal Ghazali (Captain)
16	FW	BRA	Ramon
17	FW	MAS	Amri Yahyah
19	GK	MAS	Khairul Fahmi Che Mat
20	MF	MAS	Gary Steven Robbat

No.	Pos.	Nation	Player
21	MF	MAS	Danial Haqim
22	MF	MAS	Stuart Wilkin
23	FW	MAS	Rahman Shah
24	GK	MAS	Mohd Sakri
27	MF	KOR	Ko Kwang-min
28	FW	MAS	Darren Lok
29	MF	MAS	Ummareng Bacok
31	GK	MAS	Damien Lim
33	DF	MAS	Dominic Tan
50	FW	MAS	Azhad Harraz
67	FW	IDN	Saddil Ramdani
71	DF	MAS	Irfan Zakaria
77	FW	BRA	Jailton Paraiba
78	FW	MAS	Dirga Surdi
88	FW	MAS	Maxsius Musa
91	MF	MAS	Irfan Fazail
99	FW	MAS	Shahrol Nizam Abd Rahman

== Transfers ==
=== Players in ===
Preseason

Pos.	Player	From
DF	(Brazil) Gabriel Peres	(Brazil) Grêmio Esportivo Brasil
FW	(Brazil) Jaílton Paraíba	(China) Qingdao Youth Island
MF	(South Korea) Ko Kwang-min	(South Korea) FC Seoul
MF	(Malaysia) Danial Haqim	(Malaysia) Johor Darul Ta'zim II
FW	(Malaysia) Darren Lok	(Malaysia) Petaling Jaya City
DF	(Malaysia) Dinesh Rajasingam	(Malaysia) Selangor
DF	(Malaysia) Irfan Zakaria	(Malaysia) Kuala Lumpur City
FW	(Malaysia) Jafri Firdaus Chew	(Malaysia) Penang
GK	(Malaysia) Joslan Aping	(Malaysia) PDRM
FW	(Malaysia) Kumaahran Sathasivam	(Malaysia) Petaling Jaya City
DF	(Malaysia) Randy Baruh	(Malaysia) Perak
MF	(Malaysia) Stuart Wilkin	(Malaysia) Johor Darul Ta'zim II
FW	(Nigeria) Jacob Njoku	(Malaysia) Kelantan United
MF	(Portugal) Telmo Castanheira	(Iceland) ÍBV

Mid-season

Pos.	Player	From
DF	(Spain) Cifu	(Malaysia) Kelantan
DF	(Brazil) Ramon	(Azerbaijan) Gabala

=== Players out ===
Preseason

Pos.	Player	To
DF	(Brazil) Jackson	Free Agent
FW	(Guinea-Bissau) José Embaló	Free Agent
FW	(Japan) Taiki Kagayama	Free Agent
DF	(Malaysia) Badrul Affendy	(Malaysia) Kuching City
DF	(Malaysia) Nazirul Naim	(Malaysia) Kuala Lumpur City
FW	(Malaysia) Thanabalan Nadarajah	(Malaysia) Harini
MF	(Malaysia) Tommy Mawat Bada	(Malaysia) Negeri Sembilan

Mid-season

Pos.	Player	To
FW	(Nigeria) Jacob Njoku	Free Agent
MF	(Malaysia) Baddrol Bakhtiar	Retire

=== Loans in ===
Preseason

Pos.	Player	From
DF	(Malaysia) Daniel Ting	(Malaysia) Johor Darul Ta'zim

=== Loans out ===
Preseason

Pos.	Player	To
DF	(Malaysia) Gerald Gadit	(Malaysia) Kelantan

== Friendly matches ==
Win Draw Loss

=== Pre-season friendlies ===
11 February 2023	Sabah (Malaysia)	6–0	(Singapore) Geylang International	Kota Kinabalu
19:30 MYT	Peres 9'; Ting 13'; Lok 62' (pen.); Saddil 67'; Amri 76', 90+1'			Stadium: Likas Stadium; Attendance: 5,438

15 February 2023	Sabah (Malaysia)	4–0	(Malaysia) Melaka	Kota Kinabalu
19:45 MYT	Njoku 26'; Castanheira 39'; Wilkin 43'; Paraíba 90+1'			Stadium: Likas Stadium

18 February 2023	Sabah (Malaysia)	3–0	(Singapore) Tampines Rovers	Kota Kinabalu
19:45 MYT	Peres 4' (pen.); Saddil 26'; Lok 63'			Stadium: Likas Stadium

=== International Friendlies ===
6 September 2023 International Match Tier 2	Brunei	1–3	(Malaysia) Sabah	Bandar Seri Begawan, Brunei
20:15 MYT	Adi 56'		Ramon 12' (pen.); Jafri 69'; Sappie 81'	Stadium: Track & Field Sports Complex; Referee: Mou'azhzham Zamakhsyarie Marsidi

== Competitions ==
=== Overview ===
Competition	First match	Last match	Starting round	Final position	Record							
Competition	First match	Last match	Starting round	Final position	Pld	W	D	L	GF	GA	GD	Win %
Super League	25 February 2023	17 December 2023	Matchweek 1	3rd	26	17	3	6	64	33	+31	65.38
FA Cup	15 April 2023	28 May 2023	Round of 16	Quarter Final	2	1	0	1	3	2	+1	50.00
Malaysia Cup	5 August 2023	25 September 2023	Round of 16	Quarter Final	4	1	2	1	6	4	+2	25.00
AFC Cup	20 September 2023	13 February 2024	Group Stage	Zonal Semi-Finals	7	4	0	3	19	12	+7	57.14
Total					39	23	5	11	92	51	+41	58.97

Last updated: 13 February 2024
Source: FAM-CMS

=== Malaysia Super League ===
==== League table ====
Pos	Team	Pld	W	D	L	GF	GA	GD	Pts	Qualification or relegation
1	Johor Darul Ta'zim (C)	26	25	1	0	100	7	+93	76	Qualification for the AFC Champions League Elite league stage
2	Selangor	26	20	1	5	72	22	+50	61	Qualification for the AFC Champions League Two group stage (Note: Since the winners of the 2023 Malaysia FA Cup (Johor Darul Ta'zim) qualified for Asian competition based on their league positions, the berths awarded to the 2nd-placed team in the league.)
3	Sabah	26	17	3	6	64	33	+31	54	
4	Kedah Darul Aman	26	17	2	7	52	29	+23	53	
5	Sri Pahang	26	13	6	7	44	33	+11	45	

Source: MFL
Rules for classification: 1) Points; 2) Goal difference; 3) Number of goals scored.
(C) Champions

==== Results summary ====
Overall								Home						Away					
Pld	W	D	L	GF	GA	GD	Pts	W	D	L	GF	GA	GD	W	D	L	GF	GA	GD
24	15	3	6	61	33	+28	48	10	1	1	40	19	+21	5	2	5	21	14	+7

Source: FAM-CMS

==== Results by round ====
Round	1	2	3	4	5	6	7	8	9	10	11	12	13	14	15	16	17	18	19	20	21	22	23	24	25	26
Ground	H	H	A	A	H	A	A	A	H	H	H	H	A	A	A	H	H	A^{1}	A	H	H	H	A	A	A	H
Result	W	W	W	D	W	L	L	D	W	W	D	W	L	L	W	W	W	L	W	L	W	W	W	W	W	W
Position	1	1	2	2	2	3	5	5	4	4	5	4	5	5	5	5	5	5	5	5	4	4	4	4	4	3

Source: FAM

Notes:

^1 Mutual agreement between SEL & SAB to move Match LS23 to Match 18
A = Away; H = Home; W = Win; D = Draw; L = Loss; P = Postponed

==== Fixtures and Results ====
Win Draw Loss

25 February 2023 1	Sabah	4–0	PDRM	Kota Kinabalu
19:30 MYT	Saddil 13', 71'; Ting (yellow card) 18'; Park 37'; Park (yellow card) 58'; Rizal (yellow card) 62'; Wilkin 90+3'	Report		Stadium: Likas Stadium; Attendance: 12,602; Referee: Muhammad Usaid bin Jamal; Man of the Match: Park Tae-Soo (Sabah)

1 March 2023 2	Sabah	3–1	Kelantan United	Kota Kinabalu
20:15 MYT	Lok 21' (pen.); Park 26'; Saddil (yellow card) 43'; Castanheira 46'; Jailton (yellow card) 51'	Report	Latiff (yellow card) 24'; Yan Victor (yellow card) 45+2'; Indra Putra 90+2'	Stadium: Likas Stadium; Attendance: 12,558; Referee: Tuan Mohd Yaasin bin Tuan Mohd Hanafiah; Man of the Match: Telmo Castanheira (Sabah)

6 March 2023 3	Kuching City	1–2	Sabah	Kuching
20:15 MYT	Badrul Afendy (yellow card) 5'; Kamara 45+2'; Kamara (yellow card) 48'		Saddil 24'; Park (yellow card) 44'; Castanheira 58'	Stadium: Sarawak State Stadium; Attendance: 2,500; Referee: Ahmad Zuhaidi Dzulkifli; Man of the Match: Telmo Castanheira (Sabah)

12 March 2023 4	Sri Pahang	1–1	Sabah	Kuantan
20:15 MYT	Sherman 26'; Brundo (yellow card) 83'	Report	Ting 14'; I. Zakaria (yellow card) 45+1'	Stadium: Darul Makmur Stadium; Attendance: 10,027; Referee: Noor Azriel bin Baharudin; Man of the Match: Fadhli Shas (Sri Pahang)

17 March 2023 5	Sabah	5–2	Penang	Kota Kinabalu
20:15 MYT	Park 3', 60'; Lok 45' (pen.); Ting (yellow card) 49'; Ting 55'; Saddil (yellow card) 64'; Jailton (yellow card) 66'; Wilkin (yellow card) 86'; Rizal 90+12' (pen.)	Report	Saad 8'; Khatul (yellow card) 41'; Fane (yellow card) 47'; Adriano 90+1' (pen.); Zaw (yellow card) 90+9'	Stadium: Likas Stadium; Attendance: 11,711; Referee: Zulkarnain bin Zakaria; Man of the Match: Park Tae-Soo (Sabah)

31 March 2023 6	Johor Darul Ta'zim	4–0	Sabah	Iskandar Puteri
22:00 MYT	Davies (yellow card) 19'; Arif 20'; Muñiz 39'; Syahmi 81'; Forestieri 89'	Report	Park (yellow card) 42'	Stadium: Sultan Ibrahim Stadium; Attendance: 19,836; Referee: Muhammad Nazmi bin Nasaruddin; Man of the Match: Fernando Forestieri (Johor Darul Ta'zim)

5 April 2023 7	Kuala Lumpur City	2–0	Sabah	Cheras
22:00 MYT	Saravanan 15'; Faudzi (yellow card) 45+3'; D. Lambert (yellow card) 65'; Giannelli 90+4'; Giannelli (yellow card) 90+5'	Report	Wilkin (yellow card) 43'; Peres (yellow card) 45+1'; Tan (yellow card) 58'	Stadium: Kuala Lumpur Stadium; Attendance: 1,194; Referee: Suhaizi Shukri

10 April 2023 8	Negeri Sembilan	1–1	Sabah	Seremban
22:00 MYT	Tommy 21'; Zainal (yellow card) 27'; Safuwan (yellow card) 69'; Casagrande (yellow card) 77'; Hafiz (yellow card) 90+1'	Report	Park (yellow card) 57'; Saddil (yellow card) 71'; Park 76'	Stadium: Tuanku Abdul Rahman Stadium; Attendance: 1,738; Referee: Tuan Mohd Yaasin bin Tuan Mohd Hanafiah

19 April 2023 9	Sabah	6–1	Kelantan	Kota Kinabalu
20:15 MYT	Ting 4', 11'; Rizal (yellow card) 32'; Castanheira (yellow card) 40'; Tan 48'; Baddrol 61'; Wilkin 75'; Castanheira 90+2'	Report	Cifu 46'; Nuha (yellow card) 40'; Arqués (yellow card) 53'; Arip (yellow card) 87'	Stadium: Likas Stadium; Attendance: 5,210; Referee: Mohammad Zamzaidi bin Katimin; Man of the Match: Daniel Ting (Sabah)

27 April 2023 10	Sabah	2–1	Selangor	Kota Kinabalu
19:30 MYT	Rizal (yellow card) 6'; Saddil 24' (pen.); Baddrol 66'	Report	Yazan (yellow card) 43'; Faizal 52'; Fazly (yellow card) 75'; Aliff (yellow card) 90+5'	Stadium: Likas Stadium; Attendance: 14,444; Referee: Mohd Hasrol bin Mohd Amir; Man of the Match: Baddrol Bakhtiar (Sabah)

19 May 2023 11	Sabah	2–2	Terengganu	Kota Kinabalu
19:30 MYT	Castanheira 28'; Lok 37' (pen.); Castanheira (yellow card) 45'; Robbat (yellow card) 63'; Rawilson (yellow card) 75'; Tan (yellow card) 82'; Khairul Fahmi (yellow card) 86'	Report	Habib (yellow card) 36'; Nordé 45+1', 90+4'; Syafik (yellow card) 78'	Stadium: Likas Stadium; Attendance: 12,096; Referee: S. Logeswaran; Man of the Match: Sony Nordé (Terengganu)

23 May 2023 12	Sabah	3–1	Perak	Kota Kinabalu
20:15 MYT	Lok 4'; Baddrol (yellow card) 25'; Park 32'; Baddrol 41'; Park (yellow card) 87'; Rizal (yellow card) 90+1'	Report	Raja Imran (yellow card) 63'; Harith Naem 83'; Afolabi (yellow card) 90+4'	Stadium: Likas Stadium; Attendance: 5,666; Referee: Tuan Mohd Yaasin bin Tuan Mohd Hanafiah; Man of the Match: Park Tae-Soo (Sabah)

2 June 2023 13	Kedah Darul Aman	2–1	Sabah	Alor Setar
21:00 MYT	Tuck 40', 72'; Ciger (yellow card) 60'; Tuck (yellow card) 90+2'; Ifwat (yellow card) 90+4'	Report	Peres 8'; Baddrol (yellow card) 26'; I. Zakaria (yellow card) 45+2'	Stadium: Darul Aman Stadium; Attendance: 9,741; Referee: S. Logeswaran; Man of the Match: Manny Ott(Kedah Darul Aman)

8 June 2023 14	PDRM	1–0	Sabah	Petaling Jaya
21:00 MYT	Amir Saiful (yellow card) 7'; Nabil 26'; Aliff Najmi (yellow card) 86'	Report	Ting (yellow card) 33'; Robbat (yellow card) 61'; Rawilson (yellow card) 71'	Stadium: Petaling Jaya Stadium; Attendance: 986; Referee: Razlan bin Joffri Ali; Man of the Match: Aliff Najmi Shaaini (PDRM)

26 June 2023 15	Kelantan United	0–3	Sabah	Kota Bharu
21:00 MYT	Yan Victor (yellow card) 88'	Report	Saddil 23'; Baddrol (yellow card) 35'; Wilkin 45+2'; Baddrol 62'	Stadium: Sultan Muhammad IV Stadium; Attendance: 297; Referee: Muhammad Nazmi bin Nasaeuddin; Man of the Match: Stuart Wilkin (Sabah)

8 July 2023 16	Sabah	4–3	Kuching City	Kota Kinabalu
17:45 MYT	Saddil 12'; Ramon 27', 90+4'; Wilkin 58'; Saddil (yellow card) 39'	Report	Kamara (yellow card) 10'; Amir 55'; Wan Faiz (yellow card) 60'; Kamara 67', 86'	Stadium: Likas Stadium; Attendance: 4,885; Referee: Ahmad Zuhadi Dzulkifli; Man of the Match: Ramon (Sabah)

15 July 2023 17	Sabah	4–0	Sri Pahang	Kota Kinabalu
20:15 MYT	Lok 9', 65'; Ramon 43'; Wilkin 69'; Gabriel (yellow card) 88'	Report		Stadium: Likas Stadium; Attendance: 8,022; Referee: Tuan Mohd Yaasin bin Tuan Mohd Hanafiah; Man of the Match: Darren Lok (Sabah)

~~29 October~~ 23 July 2023 23	Selangor	1–0	Sabah	Petaling Jaya
21:00 MYT	del Valle 23'; Fazly (yellow card) 36'	Report	Lok (yellow card) 39'; Tan (yellow card) 78'; Farhan (yellow card) 87'; Amri (yellow card) 88'	Stadium: Petaling Jaya Stadium; Attendance: 7,421; Referee: Suhaizi Shukri; Man of the Match: Ayron del Valle (Selangor)

30 July 2023 18	Penang	1–2	Sabah	George Town
21:00 MYT	Hadin (yellow card) 41'; Fane (yellow card) 59'; Alif 76'; Haziq (yellow card) 79'	Report	Irfan F. 9'; Ting (yellow card) 30'; Ramon 45+1'; Robbat (yellow card) 59'; Irfan F. (yellow card) 59'	Stadium: City Stadium; Attendance: 2,434; Referee: Mohamad Kamil Zakaria bin Ismail; Man of the Match: Daniel Ting (Sabah)

9 August 2023 19	Sabah	1–5	Johor Darul Ta'zim	Kota Kinabalu
20:15 MYT	Jafri 13'; Tan (yellow card) 27'; Jafri (yellow card) 66'; Ramon (yellow card) 87'	Report	Juan Muñiz 17'; Bergson 25', 63', 74'; Heberty 48'; Arif Aiman (yellow card) 45+2'; Juan Muñiz (yellow card) 61'	Stadium: Likas Stadium; Attendance: 15,203; Referee: Razlan bin Joffri Ali; Man of the Match: Bergson (Johor Darul Ta'zim)

13 August 2023 20	Sabah	3–2	Kuala Lumpur City	Kota Kinabalu
19:30 MYT	Gary Steven (yellow card) 40'; Wilkin 51'; Park 79'; Peres 90'	Report	Morales (yellow card) 23'; Morales 60'; Haqimi 71'	Stadium: Likas Stadium; Attendance: 6,462; Referee: Suhaizi Shukri; Man of the Match: Stuart Wilkin (Sabah)

26 August 2023 21	Sabah	3–1	Negeri Sembilan	Kota Kinabalu
20:15 MYT	Ramon 13', 29'; Cifu 45+1'; Peres (yellow card) 68'; Wilkin (yellow card) 90+1'; Gary Steven (yellow card) 90+4'	Report	Che Rashid (yellow card) 85'; Hein Htet Aung 90'	Stadium: Likas Stadium; Attendance: 7,094; Referee: Mohd Nafeez Abd Wahab; Man of the Match: Ramon (Sabah)

20 November 22	Kelantan	0–7	Sabah	Shah Alam
20:15 MYT		Report	Jafri 25' (pen.); Farhan 29'; Rizal 39'; Irfan F. 57'; Castanheira 68'; Ramon 70'; Kumaahran 89'	Stadium: UiTM Stadium; Attendance: 235; Referee: Mohd Fusser bin Mad Sallih; Man of the Match: Rizal Ghazali (Sabah)

24 November 2023 24	Terengganu	0–4	Sabah	Kuala Terengganu
21:00 MYT	Mamut (yellow card) 66'	Report	Ramon 6'; Saddil 29'; Cifu 40'; Jafri 48'; Ramon (yellow card) 83'	Stadium: Sultan Mizan Zainal Abidin Stadium; Attendance: 2,651; Referee: Mohd Nafeez Abd Wahab; Man of the Match: Rizal Ghazali (Sabah)

3 December 2023 25	Perak	0–1	Sabah	Ipoh
21:00 MYT		Report	Tan (yellow card) 60'; Park 85'	Stadium: Perak Stadium; Attendance: 2,781; Referee: Mohd Hasrol bin Mohd Amir; Man of the Match: Park Tae-soo (Sabah)

17 December 2023 26	Sabah	2–0	Kedah Darul Aman	Kota Kinabalu
21:00 MYT	Irfan F. 7'; Ramon 43'; Peres (yellow card) 58'; Farhan (yellow card) 88'	Report	Moses Atede (yellow card) 52'; Janasekaran (yellow card) 82'	Stadium: Likas Stadium; Attendance: 12,317; Referee: Razlan bin Joffri Ali; Man of the Match: Ramon (Sabah)

=== AFC Cup ===
Win Draw Loss

==== Group stage ====
Pos	Team	Pld	W	D	L	GF	GA	GD	Pts	Qualification	SAB	HFC	PSM	HOU
1	(Malaysia) Sabah	6	4	0	2	19	9	+10	12	Zonal semi-finals	—	4–1	1–3	3–1
2	(Vietnam) Haiphong	6	3	1	2	13	9	+4	10 (Note: Ranked on head-to-head points: Haiphong 4, PSM Makassar 1.)		3–2	—	3–0	4–0
3	(Indonesia) PSM Makassar	6	3	1	2	10	12	−2	10		0–5	1–1	—	3–1
4	(Singapore) Hougang United	6	1	0	5	6	18	−12	3		1–4	2–1	1–3	—

Source: AFC
Rules for classification: Group stage tiebreakers
Notes:

20 September 2023 1	Sabah (Malaysia)	3–1	(Singapore) Hougang United	Kota Kinabalu, Malaysia
20:00 UTC+8	Peres 5'; Lok 38', 63'	Report	Takayama 61'	Stadium: Likas Stadium; Attendance: 7,607; Referee: Jonathon Barreiro (Australia); Man of the Match: Darren Lok (Sabah)

4 October 2023 2	PSM Makassar (Indonesia)	0–5	(Malaysia) Sabah	Gianyar, Indonesia
20:00 UTC+8	R.Arya (red card) 57'	Report	Lok 6', 46'; Ting (yellow card) 25'; Peres 36'; Lok (yellow card) 45'; Cifu (yellow card) 61'; Wilkin 73'; Farhan 90+3'	Stadium: Kapten I Wayan Dipta Stadium; Attendance: 334; Referee: Kim Dae-Yong (South Korea)

24 October 2023 3	Haiphong (Vietnam)	3–2	(Malaysia) Sabah	Haiphong, Vietnam
17:00 UTC+7	Lương Hoàng Nam (yellow card) 8'; Nguyễn Hữu Sơn 14'; Đàm Tiến Dũng 18', 72'; Bissainthe (yellow card) 90+2'	Report	Wilkin (yellow card) 12'; Ramon 71'; Gary 80'	Stadium: Lạch Tray Stadium; Attendance: 7,235; Referee: Qasim Al-Hatmi (Oman)

8 November 2023 4	Sabah (Malaysia)	4–1	(Vietnam) Haiphong	Kota Kinabalu, Malaysia
20:00 UTC+8	Ting 20'; Lok 34'; Saddil (yellow card) 37'; Peres 70'; Cifu (yellow card) 72'; Park (yellow card) 83'; Jafri 90+5'	Report	Yuri 85'	Stadium: Likas Stadium; Attendance: 7,441; Referee: Qasim Al-Hatmi (Oman)

28 November 2023 5	Hougang United (Singapore)	1–4	(Malaysia) Sabah	Jalan Besar, Singapore
20:00 UTC+8	Quak 90+1'	Report	Kuriyama 16' (o.g.); Lok 45' (pen.); Ramon 50'; Aplin 77' (o.g.)	Stadium: Jalan Besar Stadium; Referee: Liu Kwok Man (Hong Kong)

12 December 2023 6	Sabah (Malaysia)	v	(Indonesia) PSM Makassar	Kota Kinabalu, Malaysia
20:00 UTC+8				Stadium: Likas Stadium

=== FA Cup ===
==== Fixtures and Results ====
Win Draw Loss

15 April 2023 Round of 16	Sabah	2–0	Kelantan United	Kota Kinabalu
21:15 MYT	Baddrol 13'; Wilkin 59'	Report		Stadium: Likas Stadium; Attendance: 4,500; Referee: S. Logeswaran; Man of the Match: Rizal Ghazali (Sabah)

28 May 2023 Quarter Final	Sabah	1–2	Kuala Lumpur City	Kota Kinabalu
17:45 MYT	Peres 6' (pen.)	Report	Morales 30'; D. Lambert (yellow card) 35'; Saravanan 44'	Stadium: Likas Stadium; Attendance: 6,797; Referee: Mohammad Zamzaidi bin Katimin; Man of the Match: Azim Al-Amin (Kuala Lumpur City)

=== Malaysia Cup ===
==== Fixtures and Results ====
Win Draw Loss

5 August 2023 Round of 16 (Leg 1)	Kuching City	0–3	Sabah	Kuching
20:15 MYT	Kamara (yellow card) 40'; Pedro (yellow card) 47'; Amir (yellow card) 67'; Ramesh (yellow card) 89'	Report	Ramon 4', 7'; Ting 15'; Rizal (yellow card) 54'; Ramzi (yellow card) 90+4'	Stadium: Sarawak State Stadium; Attendance: 763; Referee: Tuan Mohd Yaasin bin Tuan Mohd Hanafiah; Man of the Match: Ramon (Sabah)

19 August 2023 Round of 16 (Leg 2)	Sabah	1–1	Kuching City	Kota Kinabalu
20:15 MYT	Rizal Ghazali 27'; Castanheira (yellow card) 22'; Park (yellow card) 74'; Ramon (yellow card) 77'	Report	Ramesh 58'; Nurshamil (yellow card) 74'; Shitembi (yellow card) 75'	Stadium: Likas Stadium; Attendance: 6,214; Referee: Ahmad Zuhadi Dzulkifli; Man of the Match: Rizal Ghazali (Sabah)

15 September 2023 Quarter-final (Leg 1)	Sabah	2–2	Perak	Kota Kinabalu
20:15 MYT	Lok 4'; Ramon 46'; Rawilson (yellow card) 48'; Saddil (yellow card) 77'	Report	Guaycochea 10'; Wan Zack Haikal 54'; Kamal Arif (yellow card) 77'; Pillay (yellow card) 83'	Stadium: Likas Stadium; Attendance: 6,216; Referee: Tuan Mohd Yaasin bin Tuan Mohd Hanafiah; Man of the Match: Ramon (Sabah)

25 September 2023 Quarter-final (Leg 2)	Perak	1–0	Sabah	Ipoh
21:00 MYT				Stadium: Perak Stadium

== Statistics ==
=== Squad statistics ===
No.	Pos	Nat	Player	Total		Super League		FA Cup		Malaysia Cup		AFC Cup	
No.	Pos	Nat	Player	Apps	Goals	Apps	Goals	Apps	Goals	Apps	Goals	Apps	Goals
1	GK	(Malaysia)	Ramzi Mustakim	3	0	2	0	0	0	1	0	0	0
3	DF	(Malaysia)	Rawilson Batuil	17	0	14	0	1	0	1	0	1	0
4	DF	(Brazil)	Gabriel Peres	29	6	19	2	2	1	4	0	4	3
5	DF	(Malaysia)	Daniel Ting	28	6	19	4	2	0	3	1	4	1
6	DF	(South Korea)	Park Tae-Soo	29	7	22	7	2	0	1	0	4	0
8	FW	(Malaysia)	Farhan Roslan	14	2	10	1	0	0	3	0	1	1
9	DF	(Spain)	Cifu	9	2	4	2	0	0	2	0	3	0
10	MF	(Portugal)	Telmo Castanheira	22	5	17	5	2	0	2	0	1	0
11	FW	(Malaysia)	Jafri Firdaus Chew	24	4	15	3	1	0	4	0	4	1
12	FW	(Malaysia)	Kumaahran Sathasivam	9	1	8	1	1	0	0	0	0	0
13	DF	(Malaysia)	Dinesh Rajasingam	5	0	3	0	0	0	1	0	1	0
14	DF	(Malaysia)	Hanafie Tokyo	2	0	2	0	0	0	0	0	0	0
15	DF	(Malaysia)	Rizal Ghazali	28	3	21	2	2	0	4	1	1	0
16	FW	(Brazil)	Ramon	17	12	9	8	0	0	4	3	4	1
17	FW	(Malaysia)	Amri Yahyah	19	0	15	0	2	0	2	0	0	0
19	GK	(Malaysia)	Khairul Fahmi Che Mat	16	0	12	0	1	0	2	0	1	0
20	MF	(Malaysia)	Gary Steven Robbat	18	1	12	0	1	0	2	0	3	1
21	MF	(Malaysia)	Danial Haqim	0	0	0	0	0	0	0	0	0	0
22	MF	(Malaysia)	Stuart Wilkin	33	8	23	6	2	1	4	0	4	1
23	FW	(Malaysia)	Rahman Shah	0	0	0	0	0	0	0	0	0	0
25	GK	(Malaysia)	Mohd Sakri	0	0	0	0	0	0	0	0	0	0
27	MF	(South Korea)	Ko Kwang-min	30	0	20	0	2	0	4	0	4	0
28	FW	(Malaysia)	Darren Lok	27	12	19	6	1	0	3	1	4	5
29	MF	(Malaysia)	Ummareng Bacok	0	0	0	0	0	0	0	0	0	0
31	GK	(Malaysia)	Damien Lim	17	0	12	0	0	0	2	0	3	0
33	DF	(Malaysia)	Dominic Tan	29	1	20	1	2	0	3	0	4	0
50	FW	(Malaysia)	Azhad Harraz	1	0	0	0	0	0	1	0	0	0
67	FW	(Indonesia)	Saddil Ramdani	24	7	16	7	1	0	3	0	4	0
71	DF	(Malaysia)	Irfan Zakaria	19	0	16	0	0	0	2	0	1	0
77	FW	(Brazil)	Jailton Paraiba	17	0	15	0	2	0	0	0	0	0
78	FW	(Malaysia)	Dirga Surdi	0	0	0	0	0	0	0	0	0	0
88	FW	(Malaysia)	Maxsius Musa	0	0	0	0	0	0	0	0	0	0
91	MF	(Malaysia)	Irfan Fazail	18	2	12	2	0	0	3	0	3	0
99	FW	(Malaysia)	Shahrol Nizam Abd Rahman	1	0	1	0	0	0	0	0	0	0
	FW	(Nigeria)	Jacob Njoku	2	0	2	0	0	0	0	0	0	0
	MF	(Malaysia)	Baddrol Bakhtiar	15	5	13	4	2	1	0	0	0	0

Last updated: 24 November 2023
Source: FAM

=== Disciplinary record ===
N	P	Nat.	Name	Super League			FA Cup			Malaysia Cup			AFC Cup			Total			Notes
N	P	Nat.	Name	Yellow card	Second yellow card	Red card	Yellow card	Second yellow card	Red card	Yellow card	Second yellow card	Red card	Yellow card	Second yellow card	Red card	Yellow card	Second yellow card	Red card	Notes
1	GK	(Malaysia)	Ramzi Mustakim							1						1			
3	DF	(Malaysia)	Rawilson Batuil	2						1						3			
4	DF	(Brazil)	Gabriel Peres	3												3			
5	DF	(Malaysia)	Daniel Ting	5									1			6			
6	DF	(South Korea)	Park Tae-Soo	5						2			1			8			
8	FW	(Malaysia)	Farhan Roslan	1												1			
9	DF	(Spain)	Cifu										2			2			
10	MF	(Portugal)	Telmo Castanheira	2						1						3			
11	FW	(Malaysia)	Jafri Firdaus Chew	1												1			
12	FW	(Malaysia)	Kumaahran Sathasivam																
13	DF	(Malaysia)	Dinesh Rajasingam																
14	DF	(Malaysia)	Hanafie Tokyo																
15	DF	(Malaysia)	Rizal Ghazali	5						1						6			
16	FW	(Brazil)	Ramon	1						1						2			
17	FW	(Malaysia)	Amri Yahyah	1												1			
19	GK	(Malaysia)	Khairul Fahmi Che Mat	1												1			
20	MF	(Malaysia)	Gary Steven Robbat	5												5			
21	MF	(Malaysia)	Danial Haqim																
22	MF	(Malaysia)	Stuart Wilkin	3						1			1			5			
23	FW	(Malaysia)	Rahman Shah																
25	GK	(Malaysia)	Mohd Sakri																
27	MF	(South Korea)	Ko Kwang-min																
28	FW	(Malaysia)	Darren Lok	1									1			2			
29	MF	(Malaysia)	Ummareng Bacok																
31	GK	(Malaysia)	Damien Lim																
33	DF	(Malaysia)	Dominic Tan	4						1						5			
50	FW	(Malaysia)	Azhad Harraz																
67	FW	(Indonesia)	Saddil Ramdani	4						1			1			6			
71	DF	(Malaysia)	Irfan Zakaria	2												2			
77	FW	(Brazil)	Jailton Paraiba	2												2			
78	FW	(Malaysia)	Dirga Surdi																
88	FW	(Malaysia)	Maxsius Musa																
91	MF	(Malaysia)	Irfan Fazail	1												1			
99	FW	(Malaysia)	Shahrol Nizam Abd Rahman																
	FW	(Nigeria)	Jacob Njoku																
	MF	(Malaysia)	Baddrol Bakhtiar	3												3			

Last updated: 24 November 2023
Source: FAM
Ordered by (red card) , (second yellow card) and (yellow card)
(yellow card) = Number of bookings; (second yellow card) = Number of sending offs after a second yellow card; (red card) = Number of sending offs by a direct red card.

=== Goals ===
As of 30 November 2023

Rank	Player	Super League	FA Cup	Malaysia Cup	AFC Cup	Total
1	(Malaysia) Darren Lok	6	0	1	6	13
1	(Brazil) Ramon	8	0	3	2	13
3	(Malaysia) Stuart Wilkin	6	1	0	1	8
4	(South Korea) Park Tae-Soo	7	0	0	0	7
4	(Indonesia) Saddil Ramdani	7	0	0	0	7
6	(Malaysia) Daniel Ting	4	0	1	1	6
6	(Brazil) Gabriel Peres	2	1	0	3	6
8	(Malaysia) Baddrol Bakhtiar	4	1	0	0	5
8	(Portugal) Telmo Castanheira	5	0	0	0	5
10	(Malaysia) Jafri Firdaus Chew	3	0	0	1	4
11	(Malaysia) Rizal Ghazali	2	0	1	0	3
12	(Malaysia) Cifu	2	0	0	0	2
12	(Malaysia) Farhan Roslan	1	0	0	1	2
12	(Malaysia) Irfan Fazail	2	0	0	0	2
15	(Malaysia) Dominic Tan	1	0	0	0	1
15	(Malaysia) Gary Steven Robbat	0	0	0	1	1
15	(Malaysia) Kumaahran Sathasivam	1	0	0	0	1
Total		61	3	6	14	84

=== Clean sheets ===
As of 20 November 2023

Rank	Player	Super League	FA Cup	Malaysia Cup	AFC Cup	Total
1	(Malaysia) Khairul Fahmi Che Mat	5	1	0	0	6
2	(Malaysia) Damien Lim	1	0	1	1	3
Total		6	1	1	1	9
