= Damien Lim =

Malaysian footballer

Personal information
- Full name: Damien Lim Chien Khai
- Date of birth: 15 February 1997 (age 29)
- Place of birth: Kuala Lumpur, Malaysia
- Height: 1.78 m (5 ft 10 in)
- Position: Goalkeeper

Team information
- Current team: Sabah
- Number: 31

Youth career
- 2014: Selangor U21
- 2015: Harimau Muda C
- 2016–2017: Selangor U21
- 2018: PKNS U21

Senior career*
Years	Team	Apps	(Gls)
2014	Harimau Muda A	7	(0)
2017	Selangor	0	(0)
2018–2019	PKNS	0	(0)
2019	→ Kelantan (loan)	5	(0)
2019	→ Selangor United (loan)	4	(0)
2020	Petaling Jaya City	0	(0)
2021	Negeri Sembilan	13	(0)
2022–	Sabah	14	(0)

International career
2018	Malaysia U21	3	(0)
2019	Malaysia U23	1	(0)
- * Club domestic league appearances and goals as of 16 December 2023

Damien Lim Chien Khai (born 15 February 1997) is a Malaysian professional footballer who plays as a goalkeeper for Malaysia Super League club Sabah.

== Club career ==
=== Youth ===
At the age of 15, Damien played in the Malaysia national school championship (MSSM) where his team emerged as the champion. He was selected as one of the winners at the Allianz Football Camp Southeast Asia in 2012.

=== Selangor and Harimau Muda ===
Damien joined Selangor under 21 team in 2014. In the same season, he was selected into the Harimau Muda A squad for the National Premier Leagues in Australia. He was the youngest player in the squad. He made his debut against Moreton Bay United FC and made 7 appearances throughout the season. In 2015, Damien joined Harimau Muda C for the FAM League. After the disband of Harimau Muda, he return to Selangor and played in the Malaysia President's Cup with Selangor under 21 team.

=== PKNS, Kelantan and Selangor United ===
Damien joined PKNS in 2018 season and played for the under 21 team. He was loaned to Kelantan in February 2019 and made his debut in the Malaysia Premier League against UiTM FC. After a short spell with Kelantan, he was loaned to Selangor United.

=== Petaling Jaya City and Negeri Sembilan ===
Damien signed with Petaling Jaya City in 2020 but did not made any appearances for the club. In 2021 he signed with Negeri Sembilan and become the first choice goalkeeper throughout the season. He ended the season as a Malaysia Premier League champion with Negeri Sembilan.

=== Sabah (Malaysia) ===
Damien signed with Sabah F.C. in December 2021 to rejoin with his former youth coach Ong Kim Swee. He made his debut on 12 March 2022 in a 2–0 over Respect FC in the 2022 Malaysia FA Cup. He made his first ever Malaysia Super League appearances on 10 September 2022 in a 3–2 home defeat to Selangor where he came in replacing Khairul Fahmi Che Mat.

However, He made a comeback and gave the most best performance when against JDT FC on 15 and 20 November 2022 (semi-finals). He also makes two JDT FC's penalties failed to make a goal as 20 November 2022. He became the first keeper in Malaysia to successfully save a penalty kick by Johor Darul Takzim's (JDT FC) venomous striker, Bergson da Silva.

== International career ==
Damien was capped with Malaysia youth team. He was selected and played in the 2018 Newspaper Cup in Vietnam. On 17 March 2019, he made an appearances for Malaysia under 23 team in a 1–1 draw against Australia under 23 team. He also selected for the 2020 AFC U-23 Championship qualification and the 2019 Southeast Asian Games.

== Personal life ==
Damien Lim comes from a footballing family, with his father Lim Seng Koon who played for Johor and Armed Forces, his uncles Lim Teong Kim, Lim Chuan Chin, Lim Kim Choon and Lim Hong Guan represented the Malaysia national team.

== Career statistics ==
=== Club ===
As of match played 16 December 2023

Appearances and goals by club, season and competition
Club	Season	League			National cup		League cup		Others		Total	
Club	Season	Division	Apps	Goals	Apps	Goals	Apps	Goals	Apps	Goals	Apps	Goals
Harimau Muda A	2014	National Premier Leagues	7	0	–		–		–		7	0
Selangor	2017	Malaysia Super League	0	0	–		–		–		0	0
PKNS	2018	Malaysia Super League	0	0	–		–		–		0	0
PKNS	2019	Malaysia Super League	0	0	–		–		–		0	0
PKNS	Total		0	0	–		–		–		0	0
Kelantan (loan)	2019	Malaysia Premier League	5	0	1	0	–		–		6	0
Selangor United (loan)	2019	Malaysia Premier League	4	0	–		–		6	0	10	0
Petaling Jaya City	2020	Malaysia Super League	0	0	0	0	0	0	–		0	0
Negeri Sembilan	2021	Malaysia Premier League	13	0	–		2	0	–		15	0
Sabah	2022	Malaysia Super League	2	0	3	0	6	0	–		11	0
Sabah	2023	Malaysia Super League	12	0	0	0	0	0	–		12	0
Career total			43	0	4	0	8	0	6	0	61	0

== Honours ==
Negeri Sembilan

- Malaysia Premier League: 2021
