= Danial Haqim =

Malaysian footballer

Personal information
- Full name: Muhammad Danial Haqim bin Draman
- Date of birth: 29 August 1998 (age 28)
- Place of birth: Kelantan, Malaysia
- Height: 1.72 m (5 ft 7 1/2 in)
- Position: Central midfielder

Team information
- Current team: Kelantan The Real Warriors
- Number: 20

Youth career
- 2015–2018: Kelantan FA

Senior career*
Years	Team	Apps	(Gls)
2018–2020	Kelantan	32	(2)
2021–2022	Johor Darul Ta'zim II	5	(0)
2023–2025	Sabah	5	(0)
2025–	Kelantan The Real Warriors	3	(1)

International career^{‡}
2019	Malaysia U22	2	(0)
- * Club domestic league appearances and goals as of 25 October 2025 ‡ National team caps and goals as of 18 March 2019

Muhammad Danial Haqim bin Draman (born 29 August 1998) is a Malaysian professional footballer who plays as a central midfielder for Malaysia Super League club Kelantan The Real Warriors.

== Club career ==
=== Kelantan ===
Originally from Pasir Mas, Kelantan, Danial began his career with Kelantan U19 in 2015 at age 17. In June 2017, he moved to Kelantan U21 before being promoted to Kelantan first team in March 2018. Danial made his first team debut on 14 April 2018.

=== Kelantan The Real Warriors ===
On 24 October 2025, Danial scored 1 goal in a 2–1 win over Melaka.

== International career ==
Danial was part of 2019 AFF U-22 Youth Championship squad. He made 2 appearances during the tournament.

== Career statistics ==
=== Club ===
As of match played 25 October 2025

Appearances and goals by club, season and competition
Club	Season	League			Cup		League Cup		Continental		Total	
Club	Season	Division	Apps	Goals	Apps	Goals	Apps	Goals	Apps	Goals	Apps	Goals
Kelantan	2018	Malaysia Super League	16	0	0	0	0	0	–	–	16	0
Kelantan	2019	Malaysia Premier League	16	2	1	0	4 (Note: Appearances in MFL Challenge Cup)	0	–	–	21	2
Kelantan	Total		32	2	1	0	4	0	–	–	37	2
Johor Darul Ta'zim II	2020	Malaysia Premier League	4	0	–	–	–	–	–	–	4	0
Johor Darul Ta'zim II	2021	Malaysia Premier League	1	0	0	0	0	0	–	–	1	0
Johor Darul Ta'zim II	2022	Malaysia Premier League	0	0	0	0	0	0	–	–	0	0
Johor Darul Ta'zim II	Total		5	0	0	0	0	0	–	–	5	0
Sabah	2023	Malaysia Super League	0	0	0	0	0	0	–	–	0	0
Sabah	2024–25	Malaysia Super League	5	0	0	0	1 (Note: Appearances in Malaysia Cup)	1	–	–	6	1
Sabah	Total		5	0	0	0	1	1	–	–	6	1
Kelantan The Real Warriors	2025–26	Malaysia Super League	3	1	3	0	0	0	–	–	6	1
Kelantan The Real Warriors	Total		3	1	3	0	0	0	–	–	6	1
Career Total			45	3	4	0	5	1	–	–	54	4
