= Cifu (footballer, born 1990) =

Spanish footballer

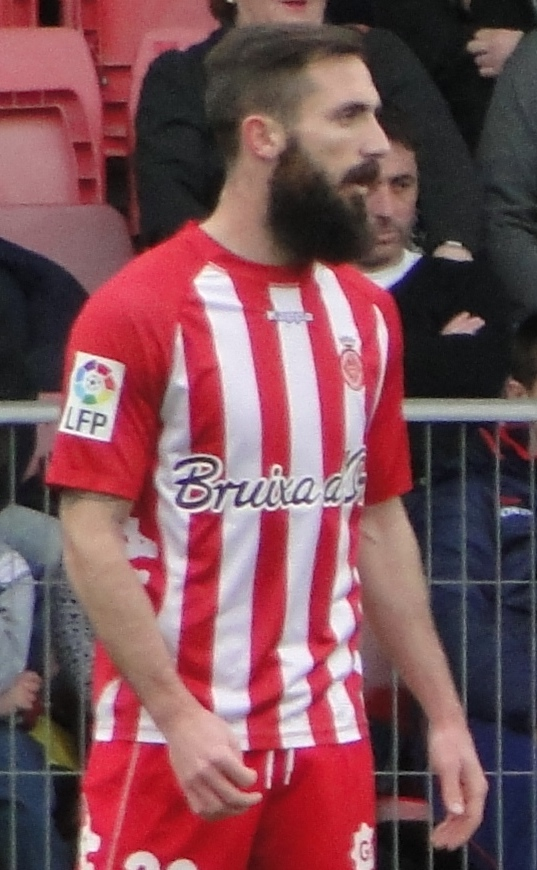
- Cifu with Girona in 2015

Personal information
- Full name: Miguel Ángel Garrido Cifuentes
- Date of birth: 5 October 1990 (age 36)
- Place of birth: Zújar, Spain
- Height: 1.74 m (5 ft 9 in)
- Positions: Right winger; right-back

Team information
- Current team: Sabah
- Number: 10

Youth career
- Independiente de Elche
- Alicante
- Elche

Senior career*
Years	Team	Apps	(Gls)
2009–2011	Torrellano Illice	52	(3)
2011–2012	Orihuela	31	(1)
2012–2015	Elche Ilicitano	33	(1)
2014–2015	→ Girona (loan)	41	(1)
2015–2016	Elche	17	(0)
2016	→ Málaga (loan)	0	(0)
2016–2020	Málaga	61	(4)
2016–2017	→ Girona (loan)	24	(0)
2018	→ Albacete (loan)	9	(0)
2020–2021	Elche	11	(0)
2021–2022	Ibiza	28	(1)
2023	Kelantan	15	(4)
2023–	Sabah	35	(5)
- * Club domestic league appearances and goals as of 13 January 2026

Miguel Ángel Garrido Cifuentes (born 5 October 1990), commonly known as Cifu, is a Spanish professional footballer who plays as a right-winger and also right-back for Malaysian Super League club Sabah.

== Football career ==
Born in Zújar, Granada, Andalusia, Cifu graduated from Elche CF's youth setup, and made his senior debut for Torrellano Illice CF (the club's farm team) in Tercera División, in 2009. On 11 August 2011 he joined Orihuela CF in Segunda División B, appearing regularly for the side.

In July 2012 Cifu returned to Elche, being assigned to the reserves in the fourth level. He appeared in 38 matches during his first campaign, scoring once and achieving promotion.

On 17 July 2014 Cifu was loaned to Segunda División's Girona FC, in a season-long deal. On 24 August he made his debut in the competition, starting in a 1–0 home win against Racing de Santander.

Cifu scored his first professional goal on 9 May 2015, netting the last in a 4–2 away win against FC Barcelona B. After his loan expired, he was subsequently assigned to the Valencians' main squad.

On 26 January 2016, as his contract was due to expire in the summer, Cifu was loaned to La Liga side Málaga CF, with a three-year permanent deal being effective at the expiration of the loan. On 15 July, after making no appearances for the Andalusians, he returned to his previous club Girona again in a temporary deal.

On 30 January 2018, Cifu was loaned to Albacete Balompié still in the second division, for six months. Upon returning, he became a regular starter for the Albicelestes, now also in division two.

On 22 September 2020, Cifu terminated his contract with Málaga, and returned to his former side Elche, now in the top tier, on a two-year contract just hours later.

On 20 July 2021, Cifu left Elche and signed a one-year deal with second division newcomers UD Ibiza.

== Personal life ==
Cifu is part of the Hipster subculture, distinguishing himself with a thick beard and tattoos.

== Career statistics ==
=== Club ===
As of match played 8 July 2023

Appearances and goals by club, season and competition
Club	Season	League			National cup (Note: Includes Copa del Rey, Malaysia FA Cup)		Other		Total	
Club	Season	Division	Apps	Goals	Apps	Goals	Apps	Goals	Apps	Goals
Elche	2010–11	Segunda División	0	0	0	0	—		0	0
Elche	2012–13	Segunda División	0	0	0	0	—		0	0
Elche	2015–16	Segunda División	17	0	1	0	—		18	0
Elche	Total		17	0	1	0	0	0	18	0
Orihuela(loan)	2011–12	Segunda División B	30	1	1	0	2 (Note: Appearances in Segunda División promotion play-offs)	0	33	1
Girona (loan)	2014–15	Segunda División	40	1	0	0	1 (Note: Appearance in La Liga promotion play-offs)	0	41	1
Málaga (loan)	2015–16	La Liga	0	0	0	0	—		0	0
Málaga	2017–18	La Liga	2	0	2	0	—		4	0
Málaga	2018–19	Segunda División	24	2	0	0	1	0	25	2
Málaga	2019–20	Segunda División	34	2	1	0	—		35	2
Málaga	Total		60	4	3	0	1	0	64	4
Girona (loan)	2016–17	Segunda División	24	0	1	0	—		25	0
Albacete (loan)	2017–18	Segunda División	9	0	0	0	—		9	0
Elche	2020–21	La Liga	11	0	3	0	—		14	0
Ibiza	2021–22	Segunda División	28	1	0	0	—		28	1
Kelantan	2023	Malaysia Super League	13	4	2	0	—		15	4
Sabah	2023	Malaysia Super League	1	0	0	0	0	0	1	0
Sabah	2024–25	Malaysia Super League	1	0	0	0	0	0	1	0
Career total			233	11	11	0	4	0	248	11
