= Rahman Shah =

Malaysian footballer

Personal information
- Full name: Rahman Shah bin Marajeh
- Date of birth: 10 July 1996 (age 30)
- Place of birth: Sabah, Malaysia
- Height: 1.81 m (5 ft 11 in)
- Position: Forward

Team information
- Current team: Sabah
- Number: 23

Senior career*
Years	Team	Apps	(Gls)
2017–2021	Sabah	16	(1)
2022	Harini	0	(0)
2023-	Sabah	0	(0)
- * Club domestic league appearances and goals as of 06 JUN 2023

Rahman Shah bin Marajeh (born 10 July 1996) sometimes spelled Rahmanshah Marajeh is a Malaysian professional footballer who plays as a forward for Malaysia Super League club Sabah.
