= Khairul Fahmi =

Malaysian footballer (born 1989)

Personal information
- Full name: Khairul Fahmi bin Che Mat
- Date of birth: 7 January 1989 (age 37)
- Place of birth: Kota Bharu, Kelantan, Malaysia
- Height: 1.73 m (5 ft 8 in)
- Position: Goalkeeper

Team information
- Current team: Melaka
- Number: 19

Youth career
- 2002–2004: Sekolah Sukan Bandar Penawar
- 2005–2006: Sekolah Sukan Bukit Jalil
- 2007–2008: Harimau Muda
- 2008: PKNS U-21
- 2008–2009: Kelantan U-21

Senior career*
| Years | Team | Apps | (Gls) |
| 2007–2008 | Harimau Muda | 1 | (0) |
| 2009–2018 | Kelantan | 159 | (0) |
| 2018–2021 | Melaka United | 58 | (0) |
| 2022–2026 | Sabah | 70 | (0) |
| 2026– | Melaka | | |

International career^{‡}
| 2010–2012 | Malaysia U23 | 28 | (0) |
| 2011–2012 | Malaysia XI | 3 | (0) |
| 2010–2021 | Malaysia | 61 | (0) |
Medal record
Men's Football
Representing Malaysia
AFF Championship
| Winner | 2010 |
| Runner-up | 2014 |
| Runner-up | 2018 |
Sea Games
| Gold medal – first place | 2011 |
- * Club domestic league appearances and goals as of 12 April 2025 ‡ National team caps and goals as of 21 December 2021

Khairul Fahmi bin Che Mat P.B. (born 7 January 1989), sometimes nicknamed Apek, is a Malaysian professional footballer who plays as a goalkeeper for Malaysia Super League club Melaka. He is also a former member of Malaysia national team.

Khairul Fahmi also holds the record to become the only player to win the Malaysia Super League 'Best Goalkeeper' award on five occasions.

== Club career ==
=== Early career ===
At his youth, Khairul Fahmi began his football career playing for Sekolah Sukan Bandar Penawar (SSBP) and Sekolah Sukan Bukit Jalil (SSBJ). During his school year, he was selected as the second choice goalkeeper for Malaysia U-17 at the 2004 AFC U-17 Championship.

=== Harimau Muda ===
Khairul Fahmi was later chosen to be in the Harimau Muda team for the 2007–08 Malaysia Premier League. Khairul Fahmi appeared in a match against ATM FA which Harimau Muda lose 2–1. Halfway through the season, he was dropped from Harimau Muda. He signed with PKNS until the end of 2008 season.

=== PSV Eindhoven Youth team trials ===
Khairul Fahmi had also impressed the Dutch club, PSV Eindhoven and went for a-week trials with the club's Under-19 and Under-23 teams. He went there with his teammate, Asraruddin Putra after they showed excellent performances in the 2007 Champions Youth Cup.

=== Return to Kelantan ===
In 2008, Khairul Fahmi returned to Kelantan as a loan player from PKNS for the 2008 Malaysia Cup. In 2009 he signed a permanent deal with Kelantan and registered as the third goalkeeper for Kelantan but he did not made any appearances for the senior side.

In 2010, he finally have the chances with the senior squad due to Halim Napi retirement and a blunder from Syed Adney during their match against Kedah in 2010 Malaysia Super League. He made his league debut on 6 March 2010 in a 1–0 away win against T-Team. In his debut season, he won the 2010 Malaysia Cup. He also won The Best Young Player and Best Goalkeeper awards at the 2010 Anugerah Bola Sepak Kebangsaan 100Plus-FAM.

In 2011, Khairul Fahmi retain as Kelantan first choice goalkeeper. He ended the season with Kelantan winning their first league title, making 24 appearances and he also won the Best Goalkeeper Award for the second consecutive time.

In 2012, Khairul Fahmi continue his fine form which saw Kelantan won their first ever treble in the Malaysian League. He also won the Best Goalkeeper Award for the third time in a row.

=== Melaka United ===
On 7 May 2018, Khairul Fahmi signed a six-month contract with Melaka United until the end of the current season. On 12 May 2018, Khairul Fahmi made his debut for Melaka United in a 0–0 draw against Perak.

On 8 February 2021, he extended his contract with the club until the end of the 2022.

=== Sabah ===
In January 2022, Khairul Fahmi signed for Sabah. He make his debut on 4 March in a 1–0 lost to Negeri Sembilan. He finished his first season with 22 appearances for the club.

Khairul Fahmi was also instrumental in the club 2023–24 AFC Cup run where he helped the club to advanced to the knockout stage.

On his final game of his professional career, Khairul Fahmi captained the side on 15 May 2026 in a league match against Terengganu on 15 May 2026. He make a total of 70 appearances across all competition for the club also helping the club to win the 2026 MFL Challenge Cup in his final season.

== International career ==
=== Malaysia under-23 national team ===
Khairul Fahmi made his first appearance for Malaysia under-23 at the 2010 Asian Games. He helped his team qualify into the second round but later lost to Iran, 1–3. Khairul Fahmi became Malaysia's hero when he saved two penalties and they won 4–3 in the penalty shootout after a 1–1 draw against Indonesia to ensure Malaysia retained the prestigious SEA Games gold medal. Khairul Fahmi also helped his team qualify into the Men's Asian Qualifiers Preliminary Round 3 of 2012 Summer Olympics Qualification. However, Malaysia failed to win any matches in the group stage.

=== Senior ===
Khairul Fahmi made his debut against Oman on 3 September 2010 replacing Sharbinee Allawee during the second half. He kept a clean sheet for the entire second half after Malaysia conceding 3 goals in the first half of the match.

In November 2010, Khairul Fahmi was called up to the Malaysia national team by coach K. Rajagopal for the 2010 AFF Suzuki Cup. Khairul kept a clean sheet against Thailand on a 0–0 draw. He also kept a clean sheet against Vietnam twice in the semi-finals. In the first leg of the finals, Khairul Fahmi played well against the Indonesians. The match ended a 3–0 win to Malaysia, thus earning another clean sheet to him. In the second leg of the finals held in Indonesia, Khairul Fahmi gave another outstanding performance by making numerous saves including a brilliant penalty save early in the match. The save proved to be a pivotal moment in the match in which Malaysia scored an away goal. Malaysia won on 4–2 aggregate and lifted the 2010 AFF Suzuki Cup title for the first time.

Khairul Fahmi was selected for the 2012 AFF Championship. On 26 November 2012, Malaysia's opening group match against Singapore ended up with the Malaysian side losing 0–3. The Lions scored the first goal through their captain, Shahril Ishak at the 32nd-minute. Six minutes later, Ishak once again scored a goal for the Lions as a result of Khairul Fahmi's blunder at goal. In the second half, veteran Singaporean forward Aleksandar Đurić completed the rout against the Tigers with the third and final goal of the game. The match resulted in 2012 AFF Suzuki Cup holders Malaysia losing its first group match of the tournament, and Khairul Fahmi was subsequently dropped for the rest of the Tigers' campaign.

However, since Kim Pan-Gon was made in charge of the Malaysian national team in 2022, he was deemed too short to play in goal, losing his spot to taller and younger goalkeepers.

== Personal life ==
Khairul Fahmi is the fourth of five siblings. He received his early education at the Sekolah Kebangsaan Tapang, Kota Bharu. Then he entered Bandar Penawar Sports School, Johor Bahru. After that he furthered Bukit Jalil Sports School (National Sports School). He was active in sports since primary school. On 28 December 2012, Khairul Fahmi married Nur Eilunie Natasha Jaafar. They have a daughter named Kayla Elayna, and a son named Khaleel Emir.

== Career statistics ==
=== Club ===
As of 12 April 2025

Appearances and goals by club, season and competition
| Club | Season | League | | | Cup (Note: Appearances in Malaysia FA Cup) | | League Cup (Note: Appearances in Malaysia Cup) | | Asia (Note: Appearances in AFC Cup) | | Total | |
| Club | Season | Division | Apps | Goals | Apps | Goals | Apps | Goals | Apps | Goals | Apps | Goals |
|---|---|---|---|---|---|---|---|---|---|---|---|---|
| Harimau Muda | 2007–08 | Malaysia Premier League | 1 | 0 | 0 | 0 | — | | — | | 1 | 0 |
| Harimau Muda | Total | | 1 | 0 | 0 | 0 | — | | — | | 1 | 0 |
| Kelantan | 2009 | Malaysia Super League | 0 | 0 | — | | 0 | 0 | — | | 0 | 0 |
| Kelantan | 2010 | Malaysia Super League | 15 | 0 | 0 | 0 | 8 | 0 | — | | 23 | 0 |
| Kelantan | 2011 | Malaysia Super League | 24 | 0 | 6 | 0 | 3 | 0 | — | | 33 | 0 |
| Kelantan | 2012 | Malaysia Super League | 20 | 0 | 4 | 0 | 10 | 0 | 6 | 0 | 40 | 0 |
| Kelantan | 2013 | Malaysia Super League | 22 | 0 | 6 | 0 | 11 | 0 | 7 | 0 | 46 | 0 |
| Kelantan | 2014 | Malaysia Super League | 22 | 0 | 4 | 0 | 7 | 0 | 4 | 0 | 37 | 0 |
| Kelantan | 2015 | Malaysia Super League | 19 | 0 | 7 | 0 | 6 | 0 | — | | 32 | 0 |
| Kelantan | 2016 | Malaysia Super League | 22 | 0 | 2 | 0 | 6 | 0 | — | | 30 | 0 |
| Kelantan | 2017 | Malaysia Super League | 11 | 0 | 1 | 0 | 1 | 0 | — | | 13 | 0 |
| Kelantan | 2018 | Malaysia Super League | 4 | 0 | 2 | 0 | — | | — | | 6 | 0 |
| Kelantan | Total | | 159 | 0 | 32 | 0 | 52 | 0 | 17 | 0 | 260 | 0 |
| Melaka United | 2018 | Malaysia Super League | 11 | 0 | 0 | 0 | 6 | 0 | — | | 17 | 0 |
| Melaka United | 2019 | Malaysia Super League | 20 | 0 | 1 | 0 | 4 | 0 | — | | 25 | 0 |
| Melaka United | 2020 | Malaysia Super League | 9 | 0 | 0 | 0 | 1 | 0 | — | | 10 | 0 |
| Melaka United | 2021 | Malaysia Super League | 18 | 0 | — | | 9 | 0 | — | | 27 | 0 |
| Melaka United | Total | | 58 | 0 | 1 | 0 | 20 | 0 | — | | 79 | 0 |
| Sabah | 2022 | Malaysia Super League | 22 | 0 | 0 | 0 | 0 | 0 | — | | 22 | 0 |
| Sabah | 2023 | Malaysia Super League | 14 | 0 | 2 | 0 | 2 | 0 | 1 | 0 | 19 | 0 |
| Sabah | 2024–25 | Malaysia Super League | 12 | 0 | 3 | 0 | 1 | 0 | 4 | 0 | 16 | 0 |
| Sabah | 2025–26 | Malaysia Super League | 7 | 0 | 1 | 0 | 2 | 0 | 0 | 0 | 10 | 0 |
| Sabah | Total | | 45 | 0 | 4 | 0 | 3 | 0 | 5 | 0 | 70 | 0 |
| Career total | | | 263 | 0 | 37 | 0 | 75 | 0 | 22 | 0 | 397 | 0 |

=== International ===
As of 19 December 2021

| National team | Year | Apps | Goals |
|---|---|---|---|
Malaysia
| Malaysia | 2010 | 7 | 0 |
| Malaysia | 2011 | 3 | 0 |
| Malaysia | 2012 | 6 | 0 |
| Malaysia | 2013 | 6 | 0 |
| Malaysia | 2014 | 8 | 0 |
| Malaysia | 2015 | 7 | 0 |
| Malaysia | 2016 | 8 | 0 |
| Malaysia | 2018 | 9 | 0 |
| Malaysia | 2019 | 2 | 0 |
| Malaysia | 2021 | 5 | 0 |
| Total | | 61 | 0 |

International appearances and goals
^{1}Appear as substitute.
| # | Date | Venue | Opponent | Result | Clean Sheet | Competition |
2010
| 1. | 3 September | Al-Wakrah, Qatar | Oman | 3–0 (L) | 1^{1} | Friendly |
| 2. | 4 December | Jakarta, Indonesia | Thailand | 0–0 (D) | 2 | AFF Suzuki Cup 2010 |
| 3. | 7 December | Jakarta, Indonesia | Laos | 5–1 (W) | | AFF Suzuki Cup 2010 |
| 4. | 15 December | Kuala Lumpur, Malaysia | Vietnam | 2–0 (W) | 3 | AFF Suzuki Cup 2010 |
| 5. | 18 December | Jakarta, Indonesia | Vietnam | 0–0 (D) | 4 | AFF Suzuki Cup 2010 |
| 6. | 26 December | Kuala Lumpur, Malaysia | Indonesia | 3–0 (W) | 5 | AFF Suzuki Cup 2010 |
| 7. | 29 December | Jakarta, Indonesia | Indonesia | 2–1 (L) | | AFF Suzuki Cup 2010 |
2011
| 8. | 9 February | Selangor, Malaysia | Hong Kong | 2–0 (W) | 6 | Friendly |
| 9. | 28 July | Selangor, Malaysia | Singapore | 1–1 (D) | | 2014 FIFA World Cup qualification |
| 10. | 7 October | Canberra, Australia | Australia | 5–0 (L) | | Friendly |
2012
| 11. | 29 February | Manila, Philippines | Philippines | 1–1 (D) | | Friendly |
| 12. | 8 June | Jalan Besar, Singapore | Singapore | 2–2 (D) | | Friendly |
| 13. | 12 June | Selangor, Malaysia | Singapore | 2–0 (W) | 7 | Friendly |
| 14. | 3 November | Hanoi, Vietnam | Vietnam | 1–0 (L) | | Friendly |
| 15. | 14 November | Shah Alam, Malaysia | Hong Kong | 1–1 (D) | | Friendly |
| 16. | 25 November | Kuala Lumpur, Malaysia | Singapore | 0–3 (L) | | 2012 AFF Suzuki Cup |
2013
| 17. | 6 February | Doha, Qatar | Qatar | 2–0 (L) | | 2015 AFC Asian Cup qualification |
| 18. | 22 March | Shah Alam, Malaysia | Yemen | 2–1 (W) | | 2015 AFC Asian Cup qualification |
| 19. | 15 October | Shah Alam, Malaysia | Bahrain | 1–1 (D) | | 2015 AFC Asian Cup qualification |
| 20. | 15 October | Kuwait City, Kuwait | Kuwait | 0–3 (L) | | Friendly |
| 21. | 15 November | Manama, Bahrain | Bahrain | 1–0 (L) | | 2015 AFC Asian Cup qualification |
| 22. | 19 November | Shah Alam, Malaysia | Qatar | 0–1 (L) | | 2015 AFC Asian Cup qualification |
2014
| 23. | 5 March | Al Ain, UAE | Yemen | 1–2 (W) | | 2015 AFC Asian Cup qualification |
| 24. | 27 April | Cebu, Philippines | Philippines | 0–0 (D) | 8 | Friendly |
| 25. | 20 October | Shah Alam, Malaysia | Cambodia | 4–1 (W) | | Friendly |
| 26. | 16 November | Hanoi, Vietnam | Vietnam | 3–1 (L) | | Friendly |
| 27. | 23 November | Jalan Besar, Singapore | Myanmar | 0–0 (D) | 9 | 2014 AFF Suzuki Cup |
| 28. | 26 November | Jalan Besar, Singapore | Thailand | 2–3 (L) | | 2014 AFF Suzuki Cup |
| 29. | 29 November | Kallang Stadium, Singapore | Singapore | 3–1 (W) | | 2014 AFF Suzuki Cup |
| 30. | 7 December | Shah Alam Stadium, Malaysia | Vietnam | 1–2 (L) | | 2014 AFF Suzuki Cup |
2015
| 31. | 6 June | Shah Alam Stadium, Malaysia | Hong Kong | 0–0 (D) | 10^{1} | Friendly |
| 32. | 11 June | National Stadium, Malaysia | Timor-Leste | 1–1 (D) | | 2018 FIFA World Cup qualification |
| 33. | 29 August | Shah Alam Stadium, Malaysia | Bangladesh | 0–0 (D) | 11 | Friendly |
| 34. | 3 September | Dubai, UAE | United Arab Emirates | 10–0 (L) | | 2018 FIFA World Cup qualification |
| 35. | 8 September | Shah Alam Stadium, Malaysia | Saudi Arabia | 1–2 (L) | | 2018 FIFA World Cup qualification |
| 36. | 13 October | National Stadium, East Timor | Timor-Leste | 0–1 (W) | 12 | 2018 FIFA World Cup qualification |
| 37. | 12 November | Amman International Stadium, Jordan | Palestine | 6–0 (L) | | 2018 FIFA World Cup qualification |
2016
| 38. | 24 March | King Abdullah Sports City, Saudi Arabia | Saudi Arabia | 2–0 (L) | | 2018 FIFA World Cup qualification |
| 39. | 26 June | Prince Charles Park, Fiji | Fiji | 1–1 (D) | | Friendly |
| 40. | 6 September | Manahan Stadium, Indonesia | Indonesia | 3–0 (L) | | Friendly |
| 41. | 11 October | Shah Alam Stadium, Malaysia | Afghanistan | 1–1 (D) | | Friendly |
| 42. | 14 November | Shah Alam Stadium, Malaysia | Papua New Guinea | 2–1 (W) | 13^{1} | Friendly |
| 43. | 20 November | Thuwunna Stadium, Myanmar | Cambodia | 3–2 (W) | | 2016 AFF Suzuki Cup |
| 44. | 23 November | Thuwunna Stadium, Myanmar | Vietnam | 0–1 (L) | | 2016 AFF Suzuki Cup |
| 45. | 26 November | Thuwunna Stadium, Myanmar | Myanmar | 1–0 (L) | | 2016 AFF Suzuki Cup |
2018
| 46. | 1 April | Bukit Jalil National Stadium, Malaysia | Bhutan | 7–0 (W) | 14 | Friendly |
| 47. | 5 July | KLFA Stadium, Malaysia | Fiji | 1–0 (W) | 15 | Friendly |
| 48. | 10 September | Phnom Penh, Cambodia | Cambodia | 1–3 (W) | | Friendly |
| 49. | 12 October | Colombo, Sri Lanka | Sri Lanka | 1–4 (W) | 16^{1} | Friendly |
| 50. | 16 October | Melaka, Malaysia | Kyrgyzstan | 0–1 (L) | | Friendly |
| 51. | 3 November | Kuala Lumpur, Malaysia | Maldives | 3–0 (W) | 17 | Friendly |
| 52. | 8 November | Phnom Penh, Cambodia | Cambodia | 0–1 (W) | 18 | 2018 AFF Suzuki Cup |
| 53. | 12 November | Kuala Lumpur, Malaysia | Laos | 3–1 (W) | | 2018 AFF Suzuki Cup |
| 54. | 16 November | Hanoi, Vietnam | Vietnam | 2–0 (L) | | 2018 AFF Suzuki Cup |
2019
| 55. | 20 March | Kuala Lumpur, Malaysia | Singapore | 0–1 (L) | | Friendly |
| 56. | 23 March | Kuala Lumpur, Malaysia | Afghanistan | 2–1 (W) | | Friendly |
2021
| 57. | 20 March | Amman, Jordan | Uzbekistan | 1–5 (L) | | Friendly |

== Exhibition matches / Malaysia XI ==
| # | Date | Location | Head coach | Opponent | Result | Team |
|---|---|---|---|---|---|---|
| 1. | 13 July 2011 | National Stadium, Bukit Jalil | K. Rajagopal | Arsenal | 0–4 (L) | Malaysia XI |
| 2. | 16 July 2011 | National Stadium, Bukit Jalil | K. Rajagopal | Liverpool | 3–6 (L) | Malaysia XI |
| 3. | 30 July 2012 | National Stadium, Bukit Jalil | K. Rajagopal | Manchester City | 1–3 (L) | Malaysia XI |

== Honours ==
=== Clubs ===
Kelantan

- Malaysia Cup (2): 2010, 2012
- Malaysia Charity Shield (1): 2011
- Malaysia Super League (2): 2011, 2012
- Malaysia FA Cup (2): 2012, 2013 Runner-up 2015

Sabah

- MFL Challenge Cup: 2026

=== International ===
- AFF Championship:

Winners: 2010
Runner-up: 2014, 2018

- 2011 Southeast Asian Games – Football:

Gold Medal: 2011

=== Individuals ===
- Malaysia Super League Best Young Player: 2010
- Malaysia Super League Best Goalkeeper: 2010, 2011, 2012, 2013, 2016
- Goal.com Asian Under-23 Best XI for 2011
- Goal.com readers' Asian Best XI of 2011
- Goal.com readers' Asian Best Goalkeeper of 2011

== Notes ==
Sporting positions
| Preceded by G. Puaneswaran | Melaka United captain 2018, 2020, 2021 | Succeeded by |
