= Sahrizan Saidin =

Malaysian footballer

Personal information
- Full name: Mohamad Sahrizan bin Saidin
- Date of birth: 1 January 1999 (age 27)
- Place of birth: Sabah, Malaysia
- Height: 1.73 m (5 ft 8 in)
- Position: Midfielder

Team information
- Current team: Immigration F.C.
- Number: 12

Youth career
- 2019–2021: Sabah

Senior career*
Years	Team	Apps	(Gls)
2021	Sabah		
- * Club domestic league appearances and goals

Mohamad Sahrizan bin Saidin (born 1 January 1999) is a Malaysian professional footballer who plays as a midfielder.
