= Nureizkhan Isa =

Malaysian footballer

Personal information
- Full name: Mohd Nureizkhan bin Isa Japar
- Date of birth: 6 October 2000 (age 26)
- Place of birth: Labuan, Federal Territory, Malaysia
- Position: Midfielder

Team information
- Current team: Immigration
- Number: 39

Youth career
- 2021–: Sabah

Senior career*
| Years | Team | Apps | (Gls) |
| 2021–2022 | Sabah | 2 | (0) |
| 2023- | Immigration | 0 | (0) |
- * Club domestic league appearances and goals as of 26 March 2023

Mohd Nureizkhan bin Isa Japar (born 6 October 2000) is a Malaysian professional footballer who plays as a midfielder for Malaysia Super League club Immigration.
