= Dirga Surdi =

Malaysian association football player

Personal information
- Full name: Dirga bin Surdi
- Date of birth: 11 July 1999 (age 27)
- Place of birth: Sabah, Malaysia
- Position: Winger

Team information
- Current team: PT Athletic F.C.
- Number: 7

Youth career
- 2014: SA United
- 2014: Subang United
- 2018: NPEG
- 2018: Teleflow

Senior career*
Years	Team	Apps	(Gls)
2019	Puchong Fuerza	6	(0)
2020	Police	9	(0)
2021	UiTM	18	(0)
2022–2023	Sabah		
2023–2023	Immigration		
- * Club domestic league appearances and goals

Dirga bin Surdi (born 11 July 1999) is a Malaysian professional footballer who plays as a winger for Malaysia A1 Semi-Pro League club PT Athletic.
