= Maxsius Musa =

Malaysian footballer

Personal information
- Full name: Maxsius Musa
- Date of birth: 21 May 1993 (age 33)
- Place of birth: Keningau, Sabah, Malaysia
- Height: 1.64 m (5 ft 5 in)
- Position: Winger

Team information
- Current team: Sabah
- Number: 88

Youth career
- 2013: Harimau Muda B

Senior career*
Years	Team	Apps	(Gls)
2013	Harimau Muda B	20	(4)
2014–	Sabah	116	(21)
- * Club domestic league appearances and goals

Maxsius Musa (born 21 May 1993) is a Malaysian professional footballer who plays as a winger for Malaysia Super League club Sabah.

== Career statistics ==
=== Club ===
As of 20 November 2022.

Appearances and goals by club, season and competition
Club	Season	League			Cup		League Cup		Other		Total	
Club	Season	Division	Apps	Goals	Apps	Goals	Apps	Goals	Apps	Goals	Apps	Goals
Harimau Muda B	2013	S. League	20	4	1	0	4	0	–		25	4
Harimau Muda B	Total		20	4	1	0	4	0	–		25	4
Sabah	2014	Malaysia Premier League	19	2	2	0	–		–		21	2
Sabah	2015	Malaysia Premier League	6	0	1	0	–		–		7	0
Sabah	2016	Malaysia Premier League	18	6	3	2	–		–		21	8
Sabah	2017	Malaysia Premier League	18	4	3	0	–		–		21	4
Sabah	2018	Malaysia Premier League	19	6	1	0	9	0	–		29	6
Sabah	2019	Malaysia Premier League	13	2	1	0	5	2	–		19	4
Sabah	2020	Malaysia Super League	8	1	–		0	0	–		8	1
Sabah	2021	Malaysia Super League	12	0	–		2	0	–		14	0
Sabah	2022	Malaysia Super League	3	0	1	0	5	1	–		9	1
Sabah	Total		116	21	12	2	21	3	–		149	26
Career Total			154	25	13	2	25	3	–		174	30

== Honour ==
Sabah

- Sukma: 2012 Gold
- Malaysia Premier League: 2019
