= Hamran Peter =

Malaysian footballer

Personal information
- Full name: Hamran Peter
- Date of birth: 6 June 1997 (age 29)
- Place of birth: Telupid, Sabah, Malaysia
- Height: 1.70 m (5 ft 7 in)
- Position: Midfielder

Team information
- Current team: Melaka United (on loan from Penang)
- Number: 21

Youth career
- –2019: Sabah

Senior career*
Years	Team	Apps	(Gls)
2020–2021	Sabah	15	(1)
2022–	Penang	0	(0)
2022–	→ Melaka United (loan)	0	(0)
- * Club domestic league appearances and goals as of 5 May 2021

Hamran Peter (born 6 June 1997) is a Malaysian professional footballer who plays as a midfielder for Malaysia Super League club Melaka United on loan from Penang.
