= Hanafie Tokyo =

Malaysian footballer

Personal information
- Full name: Abd Hanafie Tokyo bin Abd Hasim
- Date of birth: 25 March 1999 (age 27)
- Place of birth: Tongod, Sabah, Malaysia
- Position: Defender

Youth career
- 2019–2021: Sabah

Senior career*
Years	Team	Apps	(Gls)
2021–2025	Sabah	13	(0)
2025–2026	Immigration		
- * Club domestic league appearances and goals

Abd Hanafie Tokyo bin Abd Hasim (born 25 March 1999) is a Malaysian professional footballer who plays as a defender.

== Career ==
Hanafie made his debut for Sabah on 28 July 2021 in a Malaysia Super League match against Pahang. He also part of Malaysia U-23 team at the 2022 AFF U-23 Championship but he did not play in any of the matches.

In 2025, Hanafie signed to Super League promoted club, Immigration.

== Career statistics ==
=== Club ===
As of 7 December 2023

Club	Season	League		Cup		League Cup		Continental		Total	
Club	Season	Apps	Goals	Apps	Goals	Apps	Goals	Apps	Goals	Apps	Goals
Sabah	2021	4	0	–		8	0	–		12	0
Sabah	2022	6	0	1	0	4	0	–		11	0
Sabah	2023	2	0	0	0	0	0	0	0	2	0
Total		12	0	1	0	12	0	0	0	25	0
Career total		12	0	1	0	12	0	0	0	25	0
