= Gabriel Peres =

Brazilian footballer (born 1997)

Personal information
- Full name: Gabriel Schmegel Wotter Peres
- Date of birth: 5 March 1997 (age 29)
- Place of birth: Pelotas, Brazil
- Height: 1.97 m (6 ft 6 in)
- Position: Centre-back

Team information
- Current team: Kuching City
- Number: 4

Senior career*
Years	Team	Apps	(Gls)
2017–2023	Concórdia	52	(5)
2018	→ Camboriú (loan)	11	(2)
2019	→ São Paulo-RS (loan)	16	(1)
2021	→ São Paulo-RS (loan)	9	(0)
2022	CRAC	7	(0)
2022–2023	Brasil de Pelotas	6	(1)
2023–2026	Sabah	71	(15)
2026–	Kuching City	6	(0)
- * Club domestic league appearances and goals as of 18 October 2026

Gabriel Schmegel Wotter Peres (born 5 March 1997, nicknamed "Sabahan Giant Tanker" in Sabah) is a Brazilian professional footballer who plays as a centre-back for Malaysia Super League club Kuching City.

== Early life ==
Peres was born in Pelotas, Brazil and starting his career on football with Concórdia AC. Gabriel Peres began his first professional import debut in Malaysian club, as Sabah football club import player.

== Career ==
Gabriel Peres began his professional career with Concórdia in 2017, where he contributed significantly to the team’s efforts, becoming a regular fixture in their squad and helping the club maintain its place in the Série A of the Santa Catarina state league.

In 2018, Peres was loaned to Camboriú, where he competed in the Série B Catarinense. Later, in 2019, he joined São Paulo-RS on loan to compete in the Campeonato Gaúcho’s access division.

In 2021, he had another loan spell at São Paulo-RS, demonstrating his defensive skills and further solidifying his reputation with the team.

After a solid tenure at Concórdia, Peres moved to CRAC in 2022. He played in seven matches during the Goianão, where he helped the club secure a place in the Série D for the following season.

Later in 2022, he joined GE Brasil for the Série C campaign, making six appearances and scoring one goal.

In early 2023, Peres took a step into international football, signing with Sabah in Malaysia. By December 2023, Sabah supporters had nicknamed him "Tanker," a testament to his strong physical presence on the field. On 20 December 2023, Sabah announced that both Gabriel Peres and teammate Telmo Castanheira had extended their contracts, securing their roles with the team until April 2025.

== Honours ==
Sabah F.C. (Malaysia)

MFL Challenge Cup 2026 (Winner)
