= Daniel Ting =

Footballer (born 1992)

Personal information
- Full name: Daniel Sang Ting
- Date of birth: 1 December 1992 (age 33)
- Place of birth: Chester, Cheshire, England
- Height: 1.84 m (6 ft 0 in)
- Position: Defender

Team information
- Current team: Ratchaburi (on loan from Johor Darul Ta'zim)
- Number: 5

Youth career
- 2007–2011: Crewe Alexandra

Senior career*
| Years | Team | Apps | (Gls) |
| 2011–2012 | Crewe Alexandra | 0 | (0) |
| 2012 | → Market Drayton Town (loan) | | |
| 2012–2013 | Market Drayton Town | 2 | (0) |
| 2013–2014 | Congleton Town | 0 | (0) |
| 2014 | Ossett Albion | 1 | (0) |
| 2015 | Droylsden | 0 | (0) |
| 2016–2017 | Johor Darul Ta'zim II | 11 | (0) |
| 2016 | → Negeri Sembilan (loan) | 13 | (0) |
| 2018 | PKNS | 17 | (0) |
| 2021–2022 | Kuala Lumpur City | 22 | (1) |
| 2022– | Johor Darul Ta'zim | 0 | (0) |
| 2022–2023 | Johor Darul Ta'zim II | 8 | (0) |
| 2023–2026 | → Sabah (loan) | 49 | (7) |
| 2026– | → Ratchaburi (loan) | 8 | (0) |

International career^{‡}
| 2023– | Malaysia | 22 | (1) |
Medal record
Men's football
Representing Malaysia
FIFA ASEAN Cup
| Third place | 2026 Indonesia |
Merdeka Tournament
| Winner | 2024 |
- * Club domestic league appearances and goals as of 21 September 2024 ‡ National team caps and goals as of 17 November 2026 (UTC)

Daniel Sang Ting (born 1 December 1992) is a professional footballer who plays as a defender for Thai League 1 club Ratchaburi on loan from Malaysia Super League club Johor Darul Ta'zim. Born in England, he plays for the Malaysia national team. Ting paused his career for two years to move to Australia from 2019 until 2020.

== Club career ==
=== Youth ===
Ting started his football career in England. He was on the books of Crewe Alexandra earlier in his career but were released in 2012 without playing any first team match with them. He has also played for Market Drayton Town, Congleton Town, and Ossett Albion.

=== Johor Darul Ta'zim II ===
In 2016, Ting moved to Malaysia and signed with Johor Darul Ta'zim II, who loaned him to Malaysia Premier League club Negeri Sembilan for the 2016 season.

=== PKNS ===
In 2018, Ting signed with PKNS and helped the team to a third-place finish in the 2018 league, and also reached the quarter-final of the 2018 Malaysia FA Cup and the semi-final of the 2018 Malaysia Cup.

=== Career break ===
Ting stopped playing professionally and moved to Australia after the 2018 season ended.

=== Kuala Lumpur City ===
On 18 January 2021, Ting returned to Malaysia after two years and signed with Kuala Lumpur City. He became one of the key players for Kuala Lumpur City in the 2021 season, as the team won the 2021 Malaysia Cup for the first time in 32 years. He was also nominated as the best defender of the season at the National Football Awards.

=== Johor Darul Ta'zim ===
Ting left Kuala Lumpur City in March 2022 and rejoined with Johor Darul Ta'zim in July 2022. He played eight league matches for the feeder team Johor Darul Ta'zim II, with whom he won the 2022 Malaysia Premier League.

==== Sabah (loan) ====
On 8 January 2023, Ting joined Sabah on loan from Johor Darul Ta'zim.

== International career ==
Ting was born in Chester, Cheshire, England to a Malaysian Chinese father from Sarawak and an English mother, thus making him eligible to play for England and Malaysia, but he opted to represent Malaysia.

In March 2023, Ting was called up by Malaysia's national team head coach Kim Pan-gon for a training camp ahead of two friendlies against Turkmenistan and Hong Kong on 23 and 28 March 2023, respectively. He debuted against the latter, replacing La'Vere Corbin-Ong in the second half.

Ting scored his first international goal on 20 June 2023 in a friendly match against Papua New Guinea at the Sultan Mizan Zainal Abidin Stadium.

Ting was part of the national team lineup at the 2023 AFC Asian Cup. During the group stage fixture against South Korea on 25 January 2024, he went on to have a "Man of the Match" performance where he was playing at right midfielder which was not his natural position. He even gained media attention worldwide for pulling a last man sliding tackle on world class footballer, Son Heung-min.

== Career statistics ==
=== Club ===
As of 15 December 2023

Appearances and goals by club, season and competition
| Club | Season | League | | National cup (Note: Includes Malaysia FA Cup) | | League cup (Note: Includes Malaysia Cup) | | Other (Note: Includes AFC Champions League and AFC Cup) | | Total | |
| Club | Season | Apps | Goals | Apps | Goals | Apps | Goals | Apps | Goals | Apps | Goals |
|---|---|---|---|---|---|---|---|---|---|---|---|
| Johor Darul Ta'zim II | 2016 | 0 | 0 | 0 | 0 | 0 | 0 | — | | 0 | 0 |
| Johor Darul Ta'zim II | 2017 | 11 | 0 | 0 | 0 | — | | — | | 11 | 0 |
| Negeri Sembilan (loan) | 2016 | 13 | 0 | 1 | 1 | 6 | 0 | — | | 20 | 1 |
| PKNS | 2018 | 17 | 0 | 6 | 0 | 6 | 1 | — | | 29 | 1 |
| Kuala Lumpur City | 2021 | 22 | 1 | — | | 11 | 1 | — | | 33 | 2 |
| Johor Darul Ta'zim | 2022 | 0 | 0 | 0 | 0 | 0 | 0 | 0 | 0 | 0 | 0 |
| Johor Darul Ta'zim | 2023 | — | | | | | | | | | |
| Johor Darul Ta'zim II | 2022 | 8 | 0 | — | | | | | | 8 | 0 |
| Sabah (loan) | 2023 | 20 | 4 | 2 | 0 | 2 | 1 | 6 | 1 | 30 | 6 |
| Career total | | 91 | 5 | 9 | 1 | 25 | 3 | 6 | 1 | 131 | 10 |

=== International ===
As of match played 6 October 2026

Appearances and goals by national team and year
| National team | Year | Apps | Goals |
|---|---|---|---|
| Malaysia | 2023 | 4 | 1 |
| Malaysia | 2024 | 10 | 0 |
| Malaysia | 2025 | 4 | 0 |
| Malaysia | 2026 | 3 | 0 |
| Total | | 21 | 1 |

Scores and results list Malaysia's goal tally first, score column indicates score after each Ting goal.

List of international goals scored by Daniel Ting
| No. | Date | Venue | Opponent | Score | Result | Competition |
|---|---|---|---|---|---|---|
| 1 | 20 June 2023 | Sultan Mizan Zainal Abidin Stadium, Terengganu, Malaysia | Papua New Guinea | 8–0 | 10–0 | Friendly |

== Honours ==
=== Club ===
Kuala Lumpur City

- Malaysia Cup: 2021

Johor Darul Ta'zim II

- Malaysia Premier League: 2022

=== International ===
Malaysia

- Merdeka Tournament: 2024
