= Darren Lok =

Malaysian footballer (born 1990)

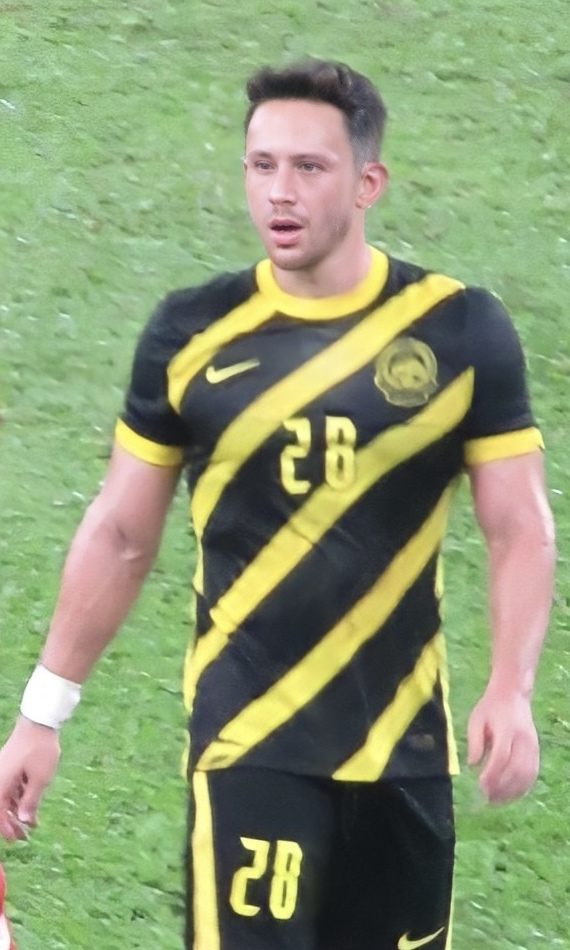
- Lok playing for Malaysia in 2022

Personal information
- Full name: Darren Lok Yee Deng
- Date of birth: 14 December 1990 (age 35)
- Place of birth: Hailsham, England
- Height: 1.74 m (5 ft 9 in)
- Position: Striker

Team information
- Current team: Sabah
- Number: 28

Youth career
- 2009–2012: Eastbourne Borough

Senior career*
Years	Team	Apps	(Gls)
2012–2016	Eastbourne Borough	140	(23)
2012	→ Horsham (loan)	2	(1)
2016–2019	Johor Darul Ta'zim II	23	(9)
2017–2019	Johor Darul Ta'zim	5	(0)
2020	Terengganu	4	(0)
2020	Terengganu II	3	(0)
2021–2022	Petaling Jaya City	29	(13)
2023–	Sabah	56	(15)

International career^{‡}
2016–	Malaysia	38	(6)
- * Club domestic league appearances and goals as of 13 September 2026 ‡ National team caps and goals as of 21 December 2024

Darren Lok Yee Deng (simplified Chinese: 陆伊腾; traditional Chinese: 陸伊騰; pinyin: Lù Yīténg; born 14 December 1990) is a professional footballer who plays as a striker for Malaysia Super League club Sabah. Born in England, he plays for the Malaysia national team.

== Early life ==
Born in Hailsham, East Sussex, Lok is of Chinese Malaysian and English descent. His father is from Tengkera in Malacca.

== Club career ==
=== Eastbourne Borough ===
Lok began his career with the Eastbourne Borough Academy. Later, he was promoted to the senior squad in 2012. Darren Lok was working shifts in an NHS psychiatric hospital as a psychiatric support worker in the south of England while also playing part-time football for Eastbourne Borough of the National League South, the sixth tier overall of the English football league system.

==== Horsham (loan) ====
At the start of the 2012–13 season, he was loaned to Horsham. He impressed at Horsham, but was recalled by Eastbourne after 2 games, due to a player shortage at the club.

Early in his Borough career, Lok gained a reputation as a 'super-sub' due to the late goals he would score after coming off the bench.

=== Johor Darul Ta'zim ===
At the end of the 2015-16 season, Lok left Eastbourne to sign for Johor Darul Ta'zim II in the Malaysia Premier League. His registration was delayed, due to having to apply for a Malaysian passport. In September 2016 he received his Malaysian passport, which enabled him to play for JDT II as well as the Malaysia national football team. Darren Lok only managed to appear twice for the JDT II team before the season ended.

For the 2017 Malaysia Super League, JDT Coach Mario Gómez announced that Lok would be promoted to the JDT first team for the 2017 season.

=== Terengganu ===
In January 2020, Terengganu has signed Lok to be with the team for the 2020 Malaysia Super League season. He only managed to make 4 league appearances for the team.

=== Petaling Jaya City ===
Petaling Jaya City announced the signing of Lok from Terengganu in December 2020. He cited a lack of playing time as one of the reasons for his decision to join PJ City after a one-year stint with Terengganu.

=== Sabah ===
In December 2022, Lok signed with Sabah.

== International career ==
Born in England, Lok was eligible to play either for England or Malaysia through his father.

Lok made his international debut against Singapore on 7 October 2016 at the Jalan Besar Stadium.

He scored his first international goal against Syria on 22 August 2017 at the Hang Jebat Stadium.

Lok was also part of the Malaysian team that qualified for the 2023 AFC Asian Cup and scored the fourth goal in their last qualifier against Bangladesh, his second international goal. Lok also represented the nation at the 2023 AFC Asian Cup.

== Career statistics ==
=== Club ===
As of 17 August 2025.

Appearances and goals by club, season and competition
Club	Season	League			National Cup		League Cup		Other		Total	
Club	Season	Division	Apps	Goals	Apps	Goals	Apps	Goals	Apps	Goals	Apps	Goals
Eastbourne Borough	2012–13	Conference South	31	5	3	2	—		2 (Note: One appearance in FA Trophy, one appearance in Sussex Senior Challenge Cup)	0	36	7
Eastbourne Borough	2013–14	Conference South	38	6	3	1	—		3 (Note: One appearance in FA Trophy, two appearances in Sussex Senior Challenge Cup)	0	44	7
Eastbourne Borough	2014–15	Conference South	38	8	5	1	—		4 (Note: One appearance in FA Trophy, three appearances and one goal in Sussex Senior Challenge Cup)	1	47	10
Eastbourne Borough	2015–16	National League South	33	4	3	1	—		8 (Note: Four appearances and one goal in FA Trophy, four appearances and three goals in Sussex Senior Challenge Cup)	4	44	9
Eastbourne Borough	Total		140	23	14	5	—		17	5	171	33
Horsham (loan)	2012–13	Isthmian League Division One South	2	1	0	0	—		0	0	2	1
Johor Darul Ta'zim II	2016	Malaysia Premier League	2	0	—						2	0
Johor Darul Ta'zim	2017	Malaysia Super League	3	0	—		5 (Note: Appearances in Malaysia Cup)	2	—		8	2
Johor Darul Ta'zim	2018	Malaysia Super League	2	0	2	0	2	0	5 (Note: Appearances in AFC Champions League qualifying play-offs and appearances in AFC Cup)	0	11	0
Johor Darul Ta'zim	Total		9	1	2	0	7	2	5	0	23	3
Johor Darul Ta'zim II	2018	Malaysia Premier League	13	8	—				7 (Note: Appearances in Malaysia Challenge Cup)	0	20	8
Johor Darul Ta'zim II	2019	Malaysia Premier League	8	1	—				4	1	12	2
Johor Darul Ta'zim II	Total		21	9	—				11	1	32	10
Terengganu FC	2020	Malaysia Super League	4	0	0	0	1	0	—		5	0
Terengganu FC II	2020	Malaysia Premier League	3	0	—						3	0
Petaling Jaya City	2021	Malaysia Super League	9	3	—		6	3	—		15	6
Petaling Jaya City	2022	Malaysia Super League	20	10	2	2	2	0	—		24	12
Petaling Jaya City	Total		36	13	2	2	8	3	—		46	18
Sabah	2023	Malaysia Super League	19	6	1	1	3	1	6	6	29	14
Sabah	2024–25	Malaysia Super League	18	4	1	0	0	0	—		19	5
Sabah	2024–25	Malaysia Super League	1	0	1	3	0	0	—		2	3
Career Total			244	56	21	11	20	6	38	12	322	86

=== International ===
As of 26 March 2024

National team	Year	Apps	Goals
Malaysia
Malaysia	2016	5	0
Malaysia	2017	4	1
Malaysia	2022	10	2
Malaysia	2023	11	3
Malaysia	2024	4	0
Malaysia	Total	34	6

=== International goals ===
Scores and results list Malaysia's goal tally first.

No	Date	Venue	Opponent	Score	Result	Competition
1.	22 August 2017	Hang Jebat Stadium, Malacca, Malaysia	Syria	1–2	1–2	Friendly
2.	14 June 2022	Bukit Jalil National Stadium, Kuala Lumpur, Malaysia	Bangladesh	4–1	4–1	2023 AFC Asian Cup qualification
3.	14 December 2022	Kuala Lumpur Stadium, Kuala Lumpur, Malaysia	Maldives	1–0	3–0	Friendly
4.	3 January 2023	Bukit Jalil National Stadium, Kuala Lumpur, Malaysia	Singapore	1–0	4–1	2022 AFF Championship
5.	6 September 2023	East Town Sports Park, Chengdu, China	Syria	2–2	2–2	Friendly
6.	21 November 2023	Taipei Municipal Stadium, Taipei, Taiwan	Chinese Taipei	1–0	1–0	2026 FIFA World Cup qualification

== Honours ==
Johor Darul Ta'zim

- Malaysia Cup: 2017
- Malaysia Super League: 2017, 2018

Johor Darul Ta'zim II

- Malaysia Challenge Cup: 2019

Malaysia

- King's Cup : 2022 runner up
- Pestabola Merdeka : 2024

== See also ==
- List of Malaysia international footballers born outside Malaysia
