= Ummareng Bacok =

Malaysian footballer

Personal information
- Full name: Ummareng Bacok
- Date of birth: 7 June 1994 (age 32)
- Place of birth: Sandakan, Sabah, Malaysia
- Height: 1.69 m (5 ft 7 in)
- Position: Midfielder

Team information
- Current team: Sabah
- Number: 29

Senior career*
Years	Team	Apps	(Gls)
2016–	Sabah	78	(2)
- * Club domestic league appearances and goals as of 31 July 2022

Ummareng Bacok (born 7 June 1994) is a Malaysian professional footballer who plays as a midfielder for Malaysia Super League club Sabah.
