= Irfan Fazail =

Malaysian footballer (born 1991)

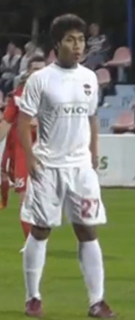

Personal information
- Full name: Mohamad Irfan bin Fazail
- Date of birth: 12 April 1991 (age 35)
- Place of birth: Pontian, Johor, Malaysia
- Height: 1.70 m (5 ft 7 in)
- Position: Midfielder

Team information
- Current team: CCCP-KDN
- Number: 7

Youth career
- 2004–2008: Bukit Jalil Sports School

Senior career*
| Years | Team | Apps | (Gls) |
| 2009–2010 | Harimau Muda | | |
| 2011–2012 | Harimau Muda A | 22 | (3) |
| 2011 | → FC ViOn Zlaté Moravce (loan) | 2 | (0) |
| 2014–2022 | Johor Darul Ta'zim | 5 | (1) |
| 2015–2021 | Johor Darul Ta'zim II | | |
| 2022 | → Sabah (loan) | 14 | (1) |
| 2023–2025 | Sabah | 24 | (3) |
| 2025–26 | PDRM | 0 | (0) |
| 2026– | CCCP-KDN | 0 | (0) |

International career
| 2010–2014 | Malaysia U23 | | |
| 2016 | Malaysia | 4 | (0) |
Medal record
Malaysia U23
Sea Games
| Gold medal – first place | Sea Games 2011 | Football |
- * Club domestic league appearances and goals as of 3 December 2023

Mohamad Irfan bin Fazail (born 12 April 1991) is a Malaysian footballer who plays as a midfielder for PDRM.

== Club career ==
Irfan Fazail was born in Pontian, Johor. He was raised in Johor Bahru and starting playing football for local clubs. He left Johor to attend the national Bukit Jalil Sports School. He later joined the SSBJ Football team in the President Cup Malaysia during his time with Bukit Jalil.

After graduating from the Bukit Jalil Sports School, Fazail joined Harimau Muda in 2008. With the team, he won the 2009 Premier League under the management of Ong Kim Swee. When Harimau Muda was split into two teams, Irfan was selected in the A team.

In 2011, Irfan played for the Slovak team FC ViOn Zlaté Moravce on a three-month loan from Harimau Muda A. Irfan made his debut with the team in a 3–0 win against AS Trenčín, coming on in the 86th minute after replacing Martin Hruška. Irfan returned to Harimau Muda A shortly after his national duty in the 2011 SEA Games. In total, Irfan made two official appearances for Zlaté Moravce.

== International career ==
Irfan represented the Malaysia under-17 team at the 2007 AFF U-17 Youth Championship. He appeared in four matches and scored five goals, including a hat-trick in a 7–0 win against Brunei.

Irfan made his first appearance for the under-19 team in 2009 at the 2009 AFF U-19 Youth Championship. Irfan appeared in 4 games but did not managed to score any goals. Malaysia finished in fourth place.

After Irfan made a big impact at Harimau Muda, he was again chosen to represent the under-19 team in the 2010 AFC U-19 Championship qualifiers. He appeared in 4 games and made 3 assists, and was also selected as the man of the match against Philippines in a 4–2 win. However, Malaysia did not qualify for the 2010 AFC U-19 Championship.

Irfan scored his first goal for the Malaysian Olympic Team against the Singapore under-23 in a 2–0 win.

Irfan made his debut for the senior national team on 6 September 2016, as a starter in the friendly match against Indonesia, which Malaysia lost 3–0.

== Honours ==
Harimau Muda

- Malaysia Premier League: 2009

International

- SEA Games: 2011
- Pestabola Merdeka: 2013
