= Harith Naem =

Malaysian footballer

Personal information
- Full name: Harith Naem bin Jaineh
- Date of birth: 26 January 2002 (age 24)
- Place of birth: Kota Belud, Malaysia
- Height: 1.71 m (5 ft 7 in)
- Position: Forward

Team information
- Current team: Perak
- Number: 27

Youth career
- 2015-2019: Akademi Mokhtar Dahari
- 2020: Selangor
- 2021: Sabah

Senior career*
Years	Team	Apps	(Gls)
2021	Sabah	2	(0)
2022	Melaka United	5	(0)
2023	Perak	0	(0)
2024-	Sabah		

International career
- Malaysia U15
2018	Malaysia U16		
- * Club domestic league appearances and goals as of 27 July 2022

Harith Naem bin Jaineh (born 26 January 2002) is a Malaysian professional footballer who plays as a forward for Malaysia Super League club Perak.
