= Telmo Castanheira =

Portuguese footballer (born 1992)

Personal information
- Full name: Telmo Ferreira Castanheira
- Date of birth: 13 April 1992 (age 34)
- Place of birth: Porto, Portugal
- Height: 1.85 m (6 ft 1 in)
- Position: Midfielder

Team information
- Current team: Atert Bissen
- Number: 6

Youth career
- 2001–2002: Progresso
- 2002–2007: Porto
- 2007–2008: Padroense
- 2008–2009: Porto
- 2010: Leixões
- 2010–2011: Marítimo

Senior career*
Years	Team	Apps	(Gls)
2011–2013	Tourizense	37	(6)
2013–2014	Freamunde	26	(0)
2014–2015	Vitória Guimarães B	16	(1)
2015–2016	Felgueiras	19	(7)
2016	Gondomar	5	(3)
2016–2017	Santa Clara	15	(1)
2017	Leixões	0	(0)
2017–2018	Gondomar	13	(9)
2018–2019	Trofense	12	(8)
2019–2022	ÍBV	79	(5)
2023–2025	Sabah	41	(5)
2025–2026	Persik Kediri	21	(2)
2006–	Atert Bissen		
- * Club domestic league appearances and goals as of 23 May 2026

Telmo Ferreira Castanheira (born 13 April 1992) is a Portuguese professional footballer who plays as a midfielder for Luxembourg National Division side Atert Bissen.

== Football career ==
On 7 September 2014, Castanheira made his professional debut with Vitória Guimarães B in a 2014–15 Segunda Liga match against Leixões.

Ahead of the 2023 season, he move to Malaysia and signed a contract with Sabah.

In July 2025, he move to Indonesia and signed a contract with Liga 1 club Persik Kediri to play in 2025–26 season.

In August 2026, Castenheira moved to Luxembourg side Atert Bissen.
