= 2026–27 Sabah F.C. season =

Sabah
2026-27 season
- Owner: Sabah Football Club Sdn Bhd
- Head coach: Juan Torres Garrido
- Stadium: Likas Stadium
- Malaysia Super League: 5th
- Malaysia FA Cup: Round of 16
- Top goalscorer: League: 4 goals Gonzalo Di Renzo; All: 4 goals Gonzalo Di Renzo
- Biggest win: 3–1 vs Star City (H) (League); 2–0 vs Penang (H) (League); 2–0 vs Terengganu (H) (League)
- Biggest defeat: 0–2 vs Kuching City (H) (League)
Home colours	Away colours

The 2026–27 season is Sabah's eleventh competitive season in the highest tier of Malaysian football since the foundation of Malaysia Super League in 2004, and the club's seventh consecutive in the Malaysia Super League.

== Squad ==
As of 12 September 2026

Note: Flags indicate national team as defined under FIFA eligibility rules; some limited exceptions apply. Players may hold more than one non-FIFA nationality.

No.	Pos.	Nation	Player
1	GK	MAS	Ramzi Mustakim
2	DF	MAS	Hanafie Tokyo
3	DF	MAS	Rawilson Batuil
5	MF	PHI	Oskari Kekkonen
7	FW	ARG	Gonzalo Di Renzo
8	MF	MAS	Farhan Roslan
9	MF	KOR	Park Jung-bin
10	MF	ESP	Cifu
13	DF	MAS	Dinesh Rajasingam
14	DF	ESP	José Ángel
17	MF	JPN	Sho Yamamoto
18	MF	MAS	Abdul Halim Saari

No.	Pos.	Nation	Player
20	MF	MAS	Fadzrul Danel
21	MF	MAS	Fayadh Zulkifli
22	GK	ARG	Juan Flere
23	DF	NZL	Dane Ingham
28	FW	MAS	Darren Lok
31	GK	MAS	Damien Lim
33	DF	MAS	Dominic Tan
34	DF	ESP	Cadete
70	MF	MAS	Fakrul Iman
72	DF	MAS	Shahrulnizam Abdullah
76	DF	MAS	Rozacklye Yanam
88	MF	MAS	Rusdi Roslan

== Transfers ==
=== Players in ===
Preseason

Position	Player	From
MF	(Malaysia) Fadzrul Danel	(Malaysia) Immigration
MF	(Malaysia) Fayadh Zulkifli	(Malaysia) Immigration
DF	(Malaysia) Hanafie Tokyo	(Malaysia) Immigration
MF	(Malaysia) Abdul Halim Saari	(Malaysia) Immigration
MF	(Philippines) Oskari Kekkonen	(Thailand) Lamphun Warriors
MF	(South Korea) Park Jung-bin	(Cambodia) Visakha
DF	(Spain) Cadete	(Mexico) C.D. Guadalajara
FW	(Argentina) Gonzalo Di Renzo	(Spain) CF Talavera de la Reina
GK	(Argentina) Juan Flere	(Spain) CE Europa
MF	(Japan) Sho Yamamoto	(Indonesia) Persis Solo

=== Players out ===
Preseason

Position	Player	To
FW	(Malaysia) Fergus Tierney	(Cyprus) PAC Omonia 29M
DF	(Brazil) Gabriel Peres	(Malaysia) Kuching City
DF	(Thailand) Ernesto Amantegui Phumipha	Free Agent
FW	(France) Chris Ondong Mba	Free Agent
FW	(Malaysia) Kumaahran Sathasivam	(Malaysia) Kuala Lumpur City
MF	(Malaysia) Gary Steven Robbat	(Malaysia) Kuala Lumpur City
GK	(Malaysia) Khairul Fahmi Che Mat	(Malaysia) Melaka
MF	(Australia) Dean Pelekanos	
FW	(Malaysia) Shahrul Nizam	Free Agent
DF	(Malaysia) Ritchie Svenson	
FW	(Malaysia) Maxsius Musa	
GK	(Malaysia) Amir Jef bin Anjam	
FW	(Haiti) Kervens Belfort	Free Agent
FW	(Malaysia) Jafri Firdaus Chew	(Malaysia) Melaka
FW	(Malaysia) Harith Naem	Free Agent

== Friendly matches ==
Win Draw Loss

31 July 2026	Sabah	5–0	Keningau FA	Keningau
20:00 MYT	Di Renzo 32'; Fakrul 39'; Lok 48'; Park 70', 74'			Stadium: Keningau Sports Complex

9 August 2026	Sabah (Malaysia)	3–0	(Brunei) Kasuka FC	Kota Kinabalu
20:30 MYT	Di Renzo 2'; (o.g.); Park 71'			Stadium: Likas Stadium

13 August 2026	Bali United F.C. (Indonesia)	1–2	(Malaysia) Sabah	Gianyar, Indonesia
20:00 MYT			Park 18'; Di Renzo 45+1'	Stadium: Kapten I Wayan Dipta Stadium

15 August 2026	Persib Bandung (Indonesia)	3–0	(Malaysia) Sabah	Gianyar, Indonesia
20:00 MYT				Stadium: Kapten I Wayan Dipta Stadium

1 October 2026	Kuching City	4–1	Sabah	Kuching
19:30 MYT			Di Renzo	Stadium: Taha Ariffin Stadium

== Competitions ==
=== Overview ===
Competition	First match	Last match	Starting round	Record							
Competition	First match	Last match	Starting round	Pld	W	D	L	GF	GA	GD	Win %
Malaysia Super League	24 August 2026		Matchday 1	7	3	1	3	10	8	+2	42.86
Malaysia FA Cup	2 September 2026	Round of 16	Round of 16	2	0	1	1	3	4	−1	0.00
Malaysia Cup				0	0	0	0	0	0	+0	—
Total				9	3	2	4	13	12	+1	33.33

Source: Competitions

=== Malaysia Super League ===
==== League table ====
Pos	Team	Pld	W	D	L	GF	GA	GD	Pts	Qualification or relegation
1	Johor Darul Ta'zim	6	6	0	0	28	0	+28	18	Qualification for the AFC Champions League Elite league stage
2	Selangor	6	6	0	0	17	4	+13	18	Qualification for the AFC Champions League Two group stage
3	Kuching City	7	5	0	2	19	7	+12	15	
4	DPMM (Note: DPMM cannot qualify for Asian Football Confederation competitions as they are based in Brunei.)	7	5	0	2	11	9	+2	15	
5	Sabah	7	3	1	3	10	8	+2	10	
6	Melaka	7	3	1	3	12	14	−2	10	
7	Star City	7	1	3	3	11	18	−7	6	
8	Kuala Lumpur City (Note: Negeri Sembilan were awarded a 3–0 win and three points after KL City were found to have failed to register enough players.)	6	2	0	4	6	16	−10	6	
9	Negeri Sembilan	7	1	2	4	8	13	−5	5	
10	Terengganu	7	1	2	4	5	11	−6	5	
11	Penang	6	1	1	4	5	10	−5	4	Relegation to Malaysia A1 Semi-Pro League
12	Kelantan Red Warrior	7	1	0	6	8	30	−22	3	Relegation to Malaysia A1 Semi-Pro League

Updated to match(es) played on 21 November 2026. Source: MFL
Rules for classification: 1) Points; 2) Goal difference; 3) Number of goals scored

==== Results summary ====
Overall								Home						Away					
Pld	W	D	L	GF	GA	GD	Pts	W	D	L	GF	GA	GD	W	D	L	GF	GA	GD
7	3	1	3	10	8	+2	10	3	0	2	8	5	+3	0	1	1	2	3	−1

Source: FAM-CMS

==== Results by Round ====
Round	1	2	3	4	5	6	7	8	9	10	11	12	13	14	15	16	17	18	19	20	21	22
Match	LS1	LS2	LS3	LS4	LS5	LS6	LS7	LS8	LS9	LS10	LS11	LS12	LS13	LS15	LS14	LS16	LS17	LS18	LS19	LS20	LS21	LS22
Ground	H	H	H	H	A	H	A	H	H	H	A	A	A	H	A	A	H	A	A	A	H	A
Result	W	W	L	L	D	W	L															
Position	5	4	4	4	5	5	5															

Source: FAM Notes:
A = Away; H = Home; W = Win; D = Draw; L = Loss

==== Fixtures and results ====
The updated league fixtures were announced on 27 August 2026.

As of 31 October 2026

Win Draw Loss

24 August 2026 LS1	Sabah	3–1	Star City	Kota Kinabalu
20:15 MYT	Ingham 26'; Ingham (yellow card) 39'; Dinesh (yellow card) 41'; Abdul Halim (yellow card) 61'; Lok 89'; Park 90+4'	Report	Vitor 29'; Leddel (yellow card) 45+1'; Aiman Yusni (yellow card) 77'	Stadium: Likas Stadium; Referee: S. Logeswaran; Man of the Match: Park Jung-bin (Sabah)

28 August 2026 LS2	Sabah	2–0	Penang	Kota Kinabalu
19:30 MYT	Di Renzo 40'; Hanafie 53'; Dinesh (yellow card) 80'	Report	Izzat (yellow card) 45'; Bakhtiyorjon (yellow card) 90+1'	Stadium: Likas Stadium; Referee: Mohd Fusser bin Mad Sallih; Man of the Match: Hanafie Tokyo (Sabah)

5 September 2026 LS3	Sabah	0–2	Kuching City	Kota Kinabalu
19:30 MYT	Fadzrul Danel (yellow card) 55'	Report	Mujagić 5', 21'; Mujagić (yellow card) 49'; Ramadhan (yellow card) 59'; Etame (yellow card) 90+4'	Stadium: Likas Stadium; Referee: Muhammad Nazmi bin Nasaruddin; Man of the Match: Petrus Shitembi (Kuching City)

13 September 2026 LS4	Sabah	1–2	(Brunei) DPMM	Kota Kinabalu
19:30 MYT	Di Renzo 25'; Abdul Halim (yellow card) 41'		Abban 12'; Aspegren (yellow card) 58'; Murray 66'	Stadium: Likas Stadium; Referee: Abdul Rahman bin Wahab; Man of the Match: Jordan Murray (DPMM)

17 October 2026 LS5	Negeri Sembilan	1–1	Sabah	Seremban
17:00 MYT	Luqman (yellow card) 54'; Motika 68' (pen.); Adam Haikal (yellow card) 77'	Report	Yamamoto (yellow card) 24'; Di Renzo 45+2'; Lim (yellow card) 87'	Stadium: Tuanku Abdul Rahman Stadium; Referee: Mohamad Faizudin bin Ismail; Man of the Match: Adam Haikal Azizol (Negeri Sembilan)

31 October 2026 LS6	Sabah	2–0	Terengganu	Kota Kinabalu
17:00 MYT	Cadete 20'; Di Renzo 25'; Kekkonen (yellow card) 51'; Cadete (yellow card) 80'; Fadzrul (yellow card) 86'	Report	Morales (red card) 42'; Kastaneer (yellow card) 58'	Stadium: Likas Stadium; Referee: Tuan Mohamad Yaasin bin Tuan Mohd Hanafiah; Man of the Match: Gonzalo Di Renzo (Sabah)

21 November 2026 LS7	Kelantan Red Warrior	2–1	Sabah	Kota Bharu
21:00 MYT	Rizuan 72'; Mbarga 85'	Report	José Ángel 32'	Stadium: Sultan Muhammad IV Stadium; Referee: Muhammad Shukor bin Zulkiflee; Man of the Match: Emmanuel Mbarga (Kelantan Red Warrior)

28 November 2026 LS8	Sabah	v	Selangor	Kota Kinabalu
20:15 MYT				Stadium: Likas Stadium

5 December 2026 LS9	Sabah	v	Melaka	Kota Kinabalu
19:30 MYT				Stadium: Likas Stadium

11 December 2026 LS10	Sabah	v	Kuala Lumpur City	Kota Kinabalu
19:30 MYT				Stadium: Likas Stadium

20 December 2026 LS11	Johor Darul Ta'zim	v	Sabah	Iskandar Puteri
17:30 MYT				Stadium: Sultan Ibrahim Stadium

4 January 2027 LS12	Star City	v	Sabah	Kangar
21:00 MYT				Stadium: Tuanku Syed Putra Stadium

8 January 2027 LS13	Terengganu	v	Sabah	Kuala Nerus
21:00 MYT				Stadium: Sultan Mizan Zainal Abidin Stadium

20 February 2027 LS14	Kuching City	v	Sabah	Kuching
21:15 MYT				Stadium: Taha Ariffin Stadium

3 February 2027 LS15 (Rescheduled)	Sabah	v	Johor Darul Ta'zim	Kota Kinabalu
20:15 MYT				Stadium: Likas Stadium

20 March 2027 LS16	DPMM (Brunei)	v	Sabah	Bandar Seri Begawan
21:15 MYT				Stadium: Hassanal Bolkiah National Stadium

3 April 2027 LS17	Sabah	v	Negeri Sembilan	Kota Kinabalu
19:30 MYT				Stadium: Likas Stadium

25 April 2027 LS18	Melaka	v	Sabah	Krubong
20:15 MYT				Stadium: Hang Jebat Stadium

30 April 2027 LS19	Kuala Lumpur City	v	Sabah	Cheras
20:15 MYT				Stadium: Kuala Lumpur Stadium

9 May 2027 LS20	Penang	v	Sabah	George Town, Penang
17:00 MYT				Stadium: City Stadium

14 May 2027 LS21	Sabah	v	Kelantan Red Warrior	Kota Kinabalu
16:45 MYT				Stadium: Likas Stadium

TBC LS22	Selangor	v	Sabah	Petaling Jaya
TBC MYT				Stadium: MBPJ Stadium

=== FA Cup ===
==== Fixtures and Results ====
The draw for the 2026-27 Malaysia FA Cup was held on 24 August 2026.
Win Draw Loss

Round of 16

2 September 2026 First leg	Sabah	2–2	Selangor	Kota Kinabalu
19:30MYT	Ingham 33'; Abdul Halim 58'; Abdul Halim (yellow card) 69'; Hanafie (yellow card) 90+1'	Report	Tejan 35'; Chrigor 50'; Safuwan (yellow card) 73' (yellow-red card) 80'	Stadium: Likas Stadium; Attendance: 6,903; Referee: Mohd Izwan bin Abdullah; Man of the Match: Hanafie Tokyo (Sabah)

9 September 2026 Second leg	Selangor	2–1 (4–3 agg.)	Sabah	Petaling Jaya
21:00MYT	Chrigor (yellow card) 35'; Sosa 36'; Chrigor 56'; Boumous (yellow card) 88'	Report	Park (yellow card) 14'; Fadzrul (yellow card) 19'; Hanafie (yellow card) 47'; Park 49'	Stadium: MBPJ Stadium; Attendance: 0 (Note: Selangor was punished with playing behind closed doors (without spectators) following incidents involving supporter misconduct during the second leg of the quarter-finals against Negeri Sembilan at the MBPJ Stadium, Petaling Jaya on 29 October.); Referee: Mohamad Nawal bin Mohammad Zubir; Man of the Match: Arbenit Xhemajli (Selangor)

Sabah lost 3–4 on aggregate.

== Statistics ==
=== Top scorers ===
As of 21 November 2026

Rank	Player	Super League	FA Cup	Malaysia Cup	Total
1	(Argentina) Gonzalo Di Renzo	4	0	0	4
2	(South Korea) Park Jung-bin	1	1	0	2
2	(New Zealand) Dane Ingham	1	1	0	2
3	(Malaysia) Abdul Halim	0	1	0	1
3	(Malaysia) Darren Lok	1	0	0	1
3	(Malaysia) Hanafie Tokyo	1	0	0	1
3	(Spain) Cadete	1	0	0	1
3	(Spain) José Ángel	1	0	0	1
Total		10	3	0	13

=== Assists ===
As of 21 November 2026

Rank	Player	Super League	FA Cup	Malaysia Cup	Total
1	(Malaysia) Fayadh Zulkifli	3	0	0	3
2	(Spain) Cifu	2	0	0	2
3	(Malaysia) Darren Lok	1	0	0	1
3	(Malaysia) Fadzrul Danel	1	0	0	1
3	(Malaysia) Shahrulnizam Abdullah	1	0	0	1
3	(Japan) Sho Yamamoto	1	0	0	1
Total		9	0	0	9

=== Clean sheets ===
As of 21 November 2026

Rank	Player	Super League	FA Cup	Malaysia Cup	Total
1	(Argentina) Juan Flere	2	0	0	2
2	(Malaysia) Damien Lim	0	0	0	0
2	(Malaysia) Ramzi Mustakim	0	0	0	0
Total		2	0	0	2

=== Squad statistics ===
As of 21 November 2026

Appearances (Apps.) numbers are for appearances in competitive games only including sub appearances.
Red card numbers denote: Numbers in parentheses represent red cards overturned for wrongful dismissal.

No.	Nat.	Player	Pos.	Super League				FA Cup				Malaysia Cup				Total			
No.	Nat.	Player	Pos.	Apps	Goal	Yellow card	Red card	Apps	Goal	Yellow card	Red card	Apps	Goal	Yellow card	Red card	Apps	Goal	Yellow card	Red card
1	(Malaysia)	Ramzi Mustakim	GK																
2	(Malaysia)	Hanafie Tokyo	DF	4	1			2		2						6	1	2	
3	(Malaysia)	Rawilson Batuil	DF	2		1		2								4		1	
5	(Philippines)	Oskari Kekkonen	MF	7		1		2								9		1	
7	(Argentina)	Gonzalo Di Renzo	FW	7	4			2								9	3		
8	(Malaysia)	Farhan Roslan	MF	3				2								5			
9	(South Korea)	Park Jung-bin	MF	5	1			2	1	1						7	2	1	
10	(Spain)	Cifu	MF	6				2								8			
13	(Malaysia)	Dinesh Rajasingam	DF	6		2		2								8		2	
14	(Spain)	José Ángel	DF	7	1	1										7	1	1	
17	(Japan)	Sho Yamamoto	MF	4		1										4		1	
18	(Malaysia)	Abdul Halim Saari	MF	2		2		2	1	1						4	1	3	
20	(Malaysia)	Fadzrul Danel	MF	6		2		2		1						8		3	
21	(Malaysia)	Fayadh Zulkifli	MF	7				2								9			
22	(Argentina)	Juan Flere	GK	5				2								7			
23	(New Zealand)	Dane Ingham	DF	6	1	1		2	1							8	2	1	
28	(Malaysia)	Darren Lok	FW	7	1			1								8	1		
31	(Malaysia)	Damien Lim	GK	4		1		1								5		1	
33	(Malaysia)	Dominic Tan	DF	7				2								9			
34	(Spain)	Cadete	DF	6	1	1		2								8	1	1	
70	(Malaysia)	Fakrul Iman	MF	2												2			
72	(Malaysia)	Shahrulnizam Abdullah	FW	3	1											3	1		
76	(Malaysia)	Rozacklye Yanam	DF																
88	(Malaysia)	Rusdi Roslan	MF																
Own goals					0				0				0				0		
Totals					10	13	0		3	5	0		0	0	0		13	18	0

† Player left the club during the season.
