= Kudat (federal constituency) =

Federal constituency of Sabah, Malaysia

Kudat (P167)
Sabah constituency

Federal constituency
- Legislature: Dewan Rakyat
- MP: Verdon Bahanda; Independent
- Constituency created: 2003
- First contested: 2004
- Last contested: 2022

Demographics
- Population (2020): 92,554
- Electors (2025): 79,115
- Area (km²): 2,300
- Pop. density (per km²): 40.2

Kudat is a federal constituency in Kudat Division (Kudat District, part of Kota Marudu District and Pitas District), Sabah, Malaysia, that has been represented in the Dewan Rakyat since 2004.

The federal constituency was created in the 2003 redistribution and is mandated to return a single member to the Dewan Rakyat under the first past the post voting system.

== Demographics ==
https://ge15.orientaldaily.com.my/seats/sabah/p

Ethnic breakdown of Kudat's electorate as of 2022
1. Sabah Bumiputera (65.1%)
2. Malay-Muslim Bumiputera (17.6%)
3. Chinese (8.90%)
4. Other ethnicities (8.40%)

As of 2020, Kudat has a population of 92,554 people.

Age breakdown of Kudat's electorate as of 2022
1. 18-20 (7.96%)
2. 21-29 (23.3%)
3. 30-39 (23.5%)
4. 40-49 (16.6%)
5. 50-59 (11.8%)
6. 60-69 (8.42%)
7. 70-79 (4.19%)
8. 80-89 (2.37%)
9. above 90 (1.86%)
Gender breakdown of Kudat's electorate as of 2022
1. Male (50.5%)
2. Female (49.5%)

== History ==
=== Polling districts ===
According to the gazette issued on 21 November 2025, the Kudat constituency has a total of 49 polling districts.

State constituency	Polling Districts	Code	Location
Banggi（N01）	Limbuak	167/01/01	SK Limbuak
Banggi（N01）	Kapitangan	167/01/02	SK Kapitangan
Banggi（N01）	Sabur	167/01/03	SK Sabur
Banggi（N01）	Karakit	167/01/04	SK Karakit Banggi
Banggi（N01）	Malawali	167/01/05	SK Tanjung Manawali
Banggi（N01）	Balambangan	167/01/06	SK Balambangan Banggi
Banggi（N01）	Maliu	167/01/07	SK Padang
Banggi（N01）	Dagotan	167/01/08	SK Dogoton
Banggi（N01）	Lok Agong	167/01/09	SK Kapitangan
Banggi（N01）	Sebogoh	167/01/10	Balai Raya Kasingpitan Sebogoh
Banggi（N01）	Loktohog	167/01/11	SK Loktohog Banggi
Banggi（N01）	Lakisan	167/01/12	SK Lakisan
Banggi（N01）	Palak	167/01/13	SK Palak
Banggi（N01）	Tigabu	167/01/14	SK Pulau Tigabu
Bengkoka (N02)	Mengkubau	167/02/01	SK Manggis/Mongkubou; SK Bawing
Bengkoka (N02)	Tanjung Piring	167/02/02	SK Mapan-Mapan
Bengkoka (N02)	Mangkapon	167/02/03	SK Mangkapon Pitas; SK Maringgan
Bengkoka (N02)	Kanibongan	167/02/04	SK Kanibongan
Bengkoka (N02)	Pantai	167/02/05	SK Pantai
Bengkoka (N02)	Kebatasan	167/02/06	SK Kusilad; SK Rukom
Bengkoka (N02)	Penapak	167/02/07	SK Pinapak
Bengkoka (N02)	Dandun	167/02/08	SK Dandun; SK Bawang Pitas
Bengkoka (N02)	Senaja	167/02/09	SK Senaja
Bengkoka (N02)	Pandan	167/02/10	SK Pandan Mandamai
Pitas（N03）	Telaga	167/03/01	SK Telaga
Pitas（N03）	Kalumpang	167/03/02	SK Pekan Pitas
Pitas（N03）	Salimpodon	167/03/03	SK Salimpodon Darat
Pitas（N03）	Pitas	167/03/04	SMK Pitas
Pitas（N03）	Liu	167/03/05	SK Liu
Pitas（N03）	Malubang	167/03/06	SK Malubang
Pitas（N03）	Rosob	167/03/07	SK Rosob
Pitas（N03）	Pinggan-Pinggan	167/03/08	SK Pinggan-Pinggan
Pitas（N03）	Sungai Eloi	167/03/09	SK Datong
Pitas（N03）	Sanitan	167/03/10	SK Nibang
Tanjung Kapor（N04）	Tiga Papan	167/04/01	SK Tiga Papan Kudat
Tanjung Kapor（N04）	Suangpai	167/04/02	SK Suangpai
Tanjung Kapor（N04）	Pengaraban	167/04/03	SK Tun Datu Hj Mustapha
Tanjung Kapor（N04）	Tanjung Kapor	167/04/04	SMK Abdul Rahim
Tanjung Kapor（N04）	Pakka	167/04/05	SK St. Peter Kudat
Tanjung Kapor（N04）	Bangau	167/04/06	SK Bangau Kudat
Tanjung Kapor（N04）	Tamalang	167/04/07	SJK (C) Our Lady Immaculate Kudat
Tanjung Kapor（N04）	Dampirit	167/04/08	SK Dampirit
Tanjung Kapor（N04）	Kudat Bandar	167/04/09	SMK Kudat
Tanjung Kapor（N04）	Milau	167/04/10	SK Nangka Kudat
Tanjung Kapor（N04）	Landong Ayang	167/04/11	SMJK Lok Yuk Kudat
Tanjung Kapor（N04）	Loro	167/04/12	SJK (C) Sacred Heart Tajau Kudat
Tanjung Kapor（N04）	Tajau	167/04/13	SJK (C) Lok Yuk Pinangsoo Kudat
Tanjung Kapor（N04）	Limau-Limauan	167/04/14	SK Limau-Limauan
Tanjung Kapor（N04）	Pantai Bahagia	167/04/15	SMK Kudat II

=== Representation history ===
Members of Parliament for Kudat
Parliament	No	Years	Member	Party	Vote Share
Constituency created, renamed from Marudu
11th	P167	2004-2008	Abdul Rahim Bakri (عبدالرحيم بكري)	BN (UMNO)	13,236; 56.61%
12th	P167	2008-2013	Abdul Rahim Bakri (عبدالرحيم بكري)	BN (UMNO)	17,634; 69.50%
13th	P167	2013-2018	Abdul Rahim Bakri (عبدالرحيم بكري)	BN (UMNO)	21,883; 61.75%
14th	P167	2018	Abdul Rahim Bakri (عبدالرحيم بكري)	BN (UMNO)	18,503; 49.90%
14th	P167	2018-2019	Abdul Rahim Bakri (عبدالرحيم بكري)	Independent	18,503; 49.90%
14th	P167	2019-2020	Abdul Rahim Bakri (عبدالرحيم بكري)	PH (BERSATU)	18,503; 49.90%
14th	P167	2020–2022	Abdul Rahim Bakri (عبدالرحيم بكري)	GRS (BERSATU)	18,503; 49.90%
15th	P167	2022–present	Verdon Bahanda (ۏردون باهندا)	Independent	16,323; 35.62%

=== State constituency ===
Parliamentary constituency	State constituency					
Parliamentary constituency	1967–1974	1974–1985	1985–1995	1995–2004	2004–2020	2020–present
Kudat					Banggi	
Kudat						Bengkoka
Kudat					Pitas	
Kudat					Tanjong Kapor	

=== Historical boundaries ===
State Constituency	Area	
State Constituency	2003	2019
Banggi	Banggi; Kampung Delima; Kampung Ranggal; Kampung Sulakalung; Ungkup	Karakit; Pulau Banggi; Pulau Balambangan; Pulau Malawali; Pulau Tigabu
Bengkoka		Bengkoka; Bilangau Besar; Kampung Ranggal; Singgah Mata; Ungkup
Pitas	Mangkabusu; Pingan Pingan; Pitas; Singgah Mata; Telaga	Melubang; Pingan Pingan; Pitas; Senaija; Telaga
Tanjong Kapor	Bangau; Kudat; Nangka; Tanjong Kapor; Tomborungus	

=== Current state assembly members ===
No.	State Constituency	Member	Coalition (Party)
N01	Banggi	Mohammad Mohamarin	GRS (GAGASAN)
N02	Bengkoka	Harun Durabi	BN (UMNO)
N03	Pitas	Ruddy Awah	GRS (GAGASAN)
N04	Tanjong Kapor	Ben Chong Chen Bin	GRS (GAGASAN)

=== Local governments & postcodes ===
No.	State Constituency	Local Government	Postcode
N01	Banggi	Kudat Town Board	89050 Kudat; 89100 Kota Marudu
N02	Bengkoka	Pitas District Council	89050 Kudat; 89100 Kota Marudu
N03	Pitas	Pitas District Council; Kota Marudu District Council (Samparita area)	89050 Kudat; 89100 Kota Marudu
N04	Tanjong Kapor	Kudat Town Board	89050 Kudat; 89100 Kota Marudu

== Election results ==
Malaysian general election, 2022
Party	Candidate	Votes	%	∆%
Independent	Verdon Bahanda	16,323	35.62	▲35.62
GRS	Ruddy Awah	14,356	31.33	▲31.33
Heritage	Abdul Rashid Abdul Harun	9,421	20.56	▼25.68
PH	Thonny Chee	4,726	10.31	▲10.31
PEJUANG	Nur Alya Humaira Usun	282	0.62	▲0.62
Total valid votes		45,108	100.00	
Total rejected ballots		714		
Unreturned ballots		234		
Turnout		46,056	59.57	▼13.55
Registered electors		75,724		
Majority		1,967	4.29	▲0.63
Independent gain from BN		Swing		?
Source(s) https://lom.agc.gov.my/ilims/upload/portal/akta/outputp/1753262/PUB619_2022.pdf

Malaysian general election, 2018
Party	Candidate	Votes	%	∆%
BN	Abdul Rahim Bakri	18,503	49.90	▼11.85
Sabah Heritage Party	Shariff Azman Shariff Along	17,144	46.24	▲46.24
Sabah People's Unity Party	Mohd Ashraf Chin Abdullah	1,432	3.86	▲3.86
Total valid votes		37,079	100.00	
Total rejected ballots		955		
Unreturned ballots		171		
Turnout		38,205	73.12	▼3.96
Registered electors		52,251		
Majority		1,359	3.66	▼31.26
BN hold		Swing		
Source(s) "His Majesty's Government Gazette - Notice of Contested Election, Parliament for the State of Sabah [P.U. (B) 246/2018]" (PDF). Attorney General's Chambers of Malaysia. 3 May 2018. "Federal Government Gazette - Results of Contested Election and Statements of the Poll after the Official Addition of Votes, Parliamentary Constituencies for the State of Sabah [P.U. (B) 320/2018]" (PDF). Attorney General's Chambers of Malaysia. 28 May 2018. Archived from the original (PDF) on 2019-12-29.

Malaysian general election, 2013
Party	Candidate	Votes	%	∆%
BN	Abdul Rahim Bakri	21,883	61.75	▼7.75
PKR	Rahimah Majid	9,507	26.83	▼3.67
STAR	Jutirim Galibai Galabi	3,083	8.70	▲8.70
SAPP	Mojurip Diyun	963	2.72	▲2.72
Total valid votes		35,436	100.00	
Total rejected ballots		919		
Unreturned ballots		66		
Turnout		36,421	77.08	▲10.10
Registered electors		47,249		
Majority		12,376	34.92	▼4.08
BN hold		Swing		
Source(s) "Federal Government Gazette - Notice of Contested Election, Parliament for the State of Sabah [P.U. (B) 183/2013]" (PDF). Attorney General's Chambers of Malaysia. 26 April 2013. Archived from the original (PDF) on 2018-09-30. "Federal Government Gazette - Results of Contested Election and Statements of the Poll after the Official Addition of Votes, Parliamentary Constituencies for the State of Sabah [P.U. (B) 224/2013]" (PDF). Attorney General's Chambers of Malaysia. 22 May 2013. Archived from the original (PDF) on 2018-09-30.

Malaysian general election, 2008
Party	Candidate	Votes	%	∆%
BN	Abdul Rahim Bakri	17,634	69.50	▲12.89
PKR	Yahya Othman	7,739	30.50	▲30.50
Total valid votes		25,373	100.00	
Total rejected ballots		1,058		
Unreturned ballots		120		
Turnout		26,551	66.98	▲1.08
Registered electors		39,643		
Majority		9,895	39.00	▲10.14
BN hold		Swing		

Malaysian general election, 2004
Party	Candidate	Votes	%
BN	Abdul Rahim Bakri	13,236	56.61
Independent	Abdul Rahman Sedik @ Sidek	6,488	27.75
Independent	Abdul Razak Abdul Salam	2,375	10.16
Independent	Asbiah Anggar	1,282	5.48
Total valid votes		23,381	100.00
Total rejected ballots		1,061	
Unreturned ballots			
Turnout		24,442	65.90
Registered electors		37,089	
Majority		6,748	28.86
This was a new constituency created.
