= Pitas =

Pitas may refer to:

- Pita, a round pocket bread
- Pitas, Malaysia, a town and district in Malaysia
- Pitas (state constituency), Malaysia
