= Bolkiah Ismail =

Malaysian politician (born 1965)

Yang Berbahagia Datuk Bolkiah Ismail PGDK KMN
- بلقية إسماعيل

Ministerial Roles (Sabah)
- 2008–2013: Assistant Minister of Tourism, Culture and Environment
- 2013–2018: Assistant Minister of Industrial Development
- 2018: Minister of Industrial Development

Member of the Sabah State Legislative Assembly for Pitas
- In office 8 March 2008 – 26 September 2020
- Preceded by: Masrani Parman (BN–UMNO)
- Succeeded by: Ruddy Awah (Independent)
- Majority: 3,848 (2008); 3,823 (2013); 1,282 (2018)

Faction represented in the Sabah State Legislative Assembly
- 2008–2018: Barisan Nasional
- 2018–2020: Sabah Heritage Party

Personal details
- Born: Bolkiah bin Ismail; 1 January 1965 (age 61) Pitas, Kudat, Sabah, Malaysia
- Citizenship: Malaysia
- Party: United Malays National Organisation of Sabah (Sabah UMNO) (until 2018, since 2020); Sabah Heritage Party (WARISAN) (2018–2020); Independent (2020)
- Other political affiliations: Barisan Nasional (BN) (until 2018, since 2020)
- Education: Bolton University
- Occupation: Politician

Bolkiah bin Ismail (born 1 January 1965) is a Malaysian politician who served as a member of the Cabinet of Sabah in the Barisan Nasional (BN) state administration under Chief Minister Musa Aman from 2008 to 2018, as well as Member of Sabah State Legislative Assembly (MLA) for Pitas from March 2008 until September 2020. He is a member and formerly the Division Chief of Kudat of the United Malays National Organisation of Sabah (Sabah UMNO), a branch of a component party of the BN coalition.

== Election results ==
Sabah State Legislative Assembly
Year	Constituency	Candidate	Votes	Pct	Opponent(s)	Votes	Pct	Ballots cast	Majority	Turnout
2008	N03 Pitas	Bolkiah Ismail (Sabah UMNO)	5,761	72.73%	Paul Tom Imbayan (PKR)	1,913	24.16%	8,198	3,848	68.69%
2008	N03 Pitas	Bolkiah Ismail (Sabah UMNO)	5,761	72.73%	Yusoff Matarang (IND)	127	1.60%	8,198	3,848	68.69%
2008	N03 Pitas	Bolkiah Ismail (Sabah UMNO)	5,761	72.73%	Jolly Majalap (IND)	120	1.51%	8,198	3,848	68.69%
2013	N03 Pitas	Bolkiah Ismail (Sabah UMNO)	6,934	60.87%	Maklin Masiau (STAR)	3,111	27.31%	11,745	3,823	78.90%
2013	N03 Pitas	Bolkiah Ismail (Sabah UMNO)	6,934	60.87%	Dausieh Queck @ Paraman (PAS)	976	8.57%	11,745	3,823	78.90%
2013	N03 Pitas	Bolkiah Ismail (Sabah UMNO)	6,934	60.87%	Johnes @ Onis Piut (SAPP)	232	2.04%	11,745	3,823	78.90%
2013	N03 Pitas	Bolkiah Ismail (Sabah UMNO)	6,934	60.87%	Awang Latip Abdul Salam (KITA)	138	1.21%	11,745	3,823	78.90%
2018	N03 Pitas	Bolkiah Ismail (Sabah UMNO)	5,606	44.40%	Maklin Masiau (WARISAN)	4,324	34.25%	13,095	1,282	75.80%
2018	N03 Pitas	Bolkiah Ismail (Sabah UMNO)	5,606	44.40%	Bakir Mancaing (PHRS)	1,527	12.09%	13,095	1,282	75.80%
2018	N03 Pitas	Bolkiah Ismail (Sabah UMNO)	5,606	44.40%	Ramlah Nasir (PKS)	508	4.02%	13,095	1,282	75.80%
2018	N03 Pitas	Bolkiah Ismail (Sabah UMNO)	5,606	44.40%	Pransol Tiying (ANAK NEGERI)	400	3.17%	13,095	1,282	75.80%
2018	N03 Pitas	Bolkiah Ismail (Sabah UMNO)	5,606	44.40%	Dausieh Queck @ Paraman (PAS)	262	2.07%	13,095	1,282	75.80%
2025	N03 Pitas	Bolkiah Ismail (Sabah UMNO)	1,331	11.00%	Ruddy Awah (GAGASAN)	5,754	47.57%	12,329	1,565	70.23%
2025	N03 Pitas	Bolkiah Ismail (Sabah UMNO)	1,331	11.00%	Harun Ismail (WARISAN)	4,189	34.63%	12,329	1,565	70.23%
2025	N03 Pitas	Bolkiah Ismail (Sabah UMNO)	1,331	11.00%	Kinchin Boluot (IMPIAN)	425	3.51%	12,329	1,565	70.23%
2025	N03 Pitas	Bolkiah Ismail (Sabah UMNO)	1,331	11.00%	Abd Hamid Kimin (KDM)	266	2.20%	12,329	1,565	70.23%
2025	N03 Pitas	Bolkiah Ismail (Sabah UMNO)	1,331	11.00%	Nazri Santong (IND)	131	1.08%	12,329	1,565	70.23%

== Honours ==
=== Honours of Malaysia ===
- Malaysia
  - Officer of the Order of the Defender of the Realm (KMN) (2011)
- Sabah
  - Commander of the Order of Kinabalu (PGDK) – Datuk (2009)
  - Star of the Order of Kinabalu (BK) (2003)
