= Abdul Rahim Bakri =

Malaysian politician

Yang Berbahagia Datuk Abdul Rahim Bakri DMSM
- عبدالرحيم بكري

Deputy Minister of Finance I
- In office 10 March 2020 – 16 August 2021 Serving with Mohd Shahar Abdullah (Deputy Minister of Finance II)
- Monarch: Abdullah
- Prime Minister: Muhyiddin Yassin
- Minister: Tengku Zafrul Aziz
- Preceded by: Amiruddin Hamzah
- Succeeded by: Mohd Shahar Abdullah
- Constituency: Kudat

Deputy Minister of Defence
- In office 16 May 2013 – 29 July 2015
- Monarch: Abdul Halim
- Prime Minister: Najib Razak
- Minister: Hishammuddin Hussein
- Preceded by: Abdul Latiff Ahmad
- Succeeded by: Mohd Johari Baharum
- Constituency: Kudat

Deputy Minister of Transport
- In office 10 April 2009 – 15 May 2013 Serving with Robert Lau Hoi Chew (2009–2010); Jelaing Mersat (2010–2013)
- Monarchs: Mizan Zainal Abidin; Abdul Halim
- Prime Minister: Najib Razak
- Minister: Ong Tee Keat (2009–2010) & Kong Cho Ha (2010–2013)
- Preceded by: Lajim Ukin
- Succeeded by: Aziz Kaprawi
- Constituency: Kudat

Deputy Minister of Foreign Affairs
- In office 19 March 2008 – 9 April 2009
- Monarchs: Mizan Zainal Abidin; Abdul Halim
- Prime Minister: Abdullah Ahmad Badawi
- Minister: Rais Yatim
- Preceded by: Joseph Salang Gandum
- Succeeded by: Kohilan Pillay; Lee Chee Leong
- Constituency: Kudat

Member of the Malaysian Parliament for Kudat
- In office 21 March 2004 – 19 November 2022
- Preceded by: Amir Kahar (BN–UMNO)
- Succeeded by: Verdon Bahanda (Independent)
- Majority: 6,748 (2004); 9,895 (2008); 12,376 (2013); 1,359 (2018)

Faction represented in Dewan Rakyat
- 2004–2018: Barisan Nasional
- 2018–2019: Independent
- 2019–2020: Pakatan Harapan
- 2020: Malaysian United Indigenous Party
- 2020–2022: Perikatan Nasional

Personal details
- Born: Abdul Rahim bin Bakri; 11 April 1961 (age 65) Crown Colony of North Borneo (now Sabah, Malaysia)
- Citizenship: Malaysian
- Party: United Malays National Organisation (UMNO) (until 2018); Independent (2018–2019); Malaysian United Indigenous Party (BERSATU) (since 2019)
- Other political affiliations: Barisan Nasional (BN) (until 2018; Pakatan Harapan (PH) (2019–2020); Perikatan Nasional (PN) (since 2020)
- Spouse: Faridah Mohd Wasli
- Children: 3
- Education: Universiti Sains Malaysia
- Occupation: Politician

Abdul Rahim bin Bakri (Jawi: عبدالرحيم بن بكري; born 11 April 1961) is a Malaysian politician who served as the Deputy Minister of Finance I in the Perikatan Nasional (PN) administration under former Prime Minister Muhyiddin Yassin and former Minister Tengku Zafrul Aziz from March 2020 to August 2021, Deputy Minister of Defence, Deputy Minister of Transport, Deputy Minister of Foreign Affairs in the Barisan Nasional (BN) administration under former Prime Ministers Abdullah Ahmad Badawi and Najib Razak and former Ministers Rais Yatim, Ong Tee Keat, Kong Cho Ha and Hishammuddin Hussein from March 2008 to May 2013 and Member of Parliament (MP) for Kudat from March 2008 to November 2022. He is a member of the Malaysian United Indigenous Party (BERSATU), a component party of the PN coalition was a member of the United Malays National Organisation (UMNO), a component party of the BN coalition. After the defeat of BN to PH in the 2018 general election, he resigned from UMNO in 2018 and joined BERSATU in 2019.

Abdul Rahim was elected to federal Parliament in the 2004 general election. Since 2008 he had been a deputy minister in the former ruling Barisan Nasional (BN) government till 2018. In April 2008, he was appointed as Deputy Minister of Foreign Affairs, and was appointed Deputy Minister of Transport in April 2009. He was again moved, this time being appointed as the Deputy Minister of Defence, after the 2013 election.

== Election results ==
Parliament of Malaysia
Year	Constituency	Candidate	Votes	Pct	Opponent(s)	Votes	Pct	Ballots Cast	Majority	Turnout
2004	P167 Kudat	Abdul Rahim Bakri (UMNO)	13,236	56.61%	Abdul Rahman Sedik (IND)	6,488	27.75%	24,442	6,748	65.90%
2004	P167 Kudat	Abdul Rahim Bakri (UMNO)	13,236	56.61%	Abdul Razak Abdul Salam (IND)	2,375	10.16%	24,442	6,748	65.90%
2004	P167 Kudat	Abdul Rahim Bakri (UMNO)	13,236	56.61%	Asbiah Anggar (IND)	1,282	5.48%	24,442	6,748	65.90%
2008	P167 Kudat	Abdul Rahim Bakri (UMNO)	17,634	69.50%	Yahya Othman (PKR)	7,739	30.50%	26,551	9,895	66.98%
2013	P167 Kudat	Abdul Rahim Bakri (UMNO)	21,883	61.75%	Rahimah Majid (PKR)	9,507	26.83%	36,421	12,376	77.08%
2013	P167 Kudat	Abdul Rahim Bakri (UMNO)	21,883	61.75%	Jutirim Galibai Galabi (STAR)	3,083	8.70%	36,421	12,376	77.08%
2013	P167 Kudat	Abdul Rahim Bakri (UMNO)	21,883	61.75%	Mojurip Diyun (SAPP)	963	2.72%	36,421	12,376	77.08%
2018	P167 Kudat	Abdul Rahim Bakri (UMNO)	18,503	49.90%	Shariff Azman Shariff Along (WARISAN)	17,144	46.24%	38,205	1,359	73.12%
2018	P167 Kudat	Abdul Rahim Bakri (UMNO)	18,503	49.90%	Mohd Ashraf Chin Abdullah (PPRS)	1,432	3.86%	38,205	1,359	73.12%

== Honours ==
- Malacca
  - Companion Class I of the Exalted Order of Malacca (DMSM) – Datuk (2002)

== See also ==
- Kudat (federal constituency)
