= Ruddy Awah =

Malaysian politician (born 1969)

Yang Berhormat Dato' Sri Dr. Ruddy Awah SSAP JP MLA

State Assistant Minister of Works and Utilities of Sabah
- Incumbent
- Assumed office 2 December 2025 Serving with Limus Jury
- Governor: Musa Aman
- Chief Minister: Hajiji Noor
- State Minister: Joachim Gunsalam
- Preceded by: Robert Tawik (as State Assistant Minister of Works of Sabah)
- Constituency: Pitas

State Assistant Minister of Rural Development of Sabah
- In office 26 January 2023 – 30 November 2025 Serving with Samad Jambri
- Governor: Juhar Mahiruddin (2023–2024); Musa Aman (2025)
- Chief Minister: Hajiji Noor
- State Minister: Jahid Jahim
- Preceded by: Harun Durabi
- Succeeded by: Juil Nuatim
- Constituency: Pitas

State Assistant Minister of Science, Technology and Innovation of Sabah
- In office 8 October 2020 – 26 January 2023
- Governor: Juhar Mahiruddin
- Chief Minister: Hajiji Noor
- State Minister: Mohd Arifin Mohd Arif
- Preceded by: Mohammad Mohamarin & Jennifer Lasimbang (as State Assistant Minister of Education and Innovation of Sabah)
- Succeeded by: Harun Durabi
- Constituency: Pitas

Member of the Sabah State Legislative Assembly for Pitas
- Incumbent
- Assumed office 26 September 2020
- Preceded by: Bolkiah Ismail (BN–UMNO)
- Majority: 559 (2020); 1,565 (2025)

Faction represented in the Sabah State Legislative Assembly
- 2020–2021: Independent
- 2021–2022: Perikatan Nasional
- 2022–: Gabungan Rakyat Sabah

Personal details
- Born: Ruddy bin Awah; 2 January 1969 (age 57) Pitas, Sabah, Malaysia
- Party: People's Justice Party (PKR) (until 2020); Independent (2020–2021); Malaysian United Indigenous Party of Sabah (Sabah BERSATU) (2021–2022); Parti Gagasan Rakyat Sabah (GAGASAN) (since 2023)
- Other political affiliations: Pakatan Harapan (PH) (until 2020); Perikatan Nasional (PN) (2020–2022); Gabungan Rakyat Sabah (GRS) (since 2020)
- Spouse: Asiah Udian (married 1989)
- Children: Asdy Ruddy, Asroy Ruddy, Nazira Ruddy, Asmey Ruddy, Azirah Ruddy, Aswady Ruddy
- Occupation: Politician
- Website: https://pitasdihatiku.com

Ruddy bin Awah (born 2 January 1969) is a Malaysian politician who has served as State Assistant Minister of Works and Utilities of Sabah in the Gabungan Rakyat Sabah (GRS) state administration under Chief Minister Hajiji Noor and Minister Joachim Gunsalam since December 2025, State Assistant Minister of Rural Development of Sabah under Minister Jahid Jahim from January 2023 until November 2025 and State Assistant Minister of Science, Technology and Innovation of Sabah under Minister Mohd Arifin Mohd Arif from October 2020 until January 2023, as well as Member of the Sabah State Legislative Assembly (MLA) for Pitas since September 2020. He is a member of the Parti Gagasan Rakyat Sabah (GAGASAN), a component party of the GRS coalition. He is formerly a member of the Malaysian United Indigenous Party of Sabah (Sabah BERSATU), a component party of the Perikatan Nasional (PN) and formerly GRS coalitions as well as a member of the People's Justice Party (PKR), a component party of the Pakatan Harapan (PH) coalition.

== Election results ==
Parliament of Malaysia
Year	Constituency	Candidate	Votes	Pct	Opponent(s)	Votes	Pct	Ballots cast	Majority	Turnout
2022	P167 Kudat	Ruddy Awah (Sabah BERSATU)	14,356	31.83%	Verdon Bahanda (IND)	16,323	36.19%	45,108	1,967	59.57%
2022	P167 Kudat	Ruddy Awah (Sabah BERSATU)	14,356	31.83%	Rashid Abdul Harun (WARISAN)	9,421	20.89%	45,108	1,967	59.57%
2022	P167 Kudat	Ruddy Awah (Sabah BERSATU)	14,356	31.83%	Thonny Chee (PKR)	4,726	10.48%	45,108	1,967	59.57%
2022	P167 Kudat	Ruddy Awah (Sabah BERSATU)	14,356	31.83%	Nur Alya Humaira Usun (PEJUANG)	282	0.63%	45,108	1,967	59.57%

Sabah State Legislative Assembly
Year	Constituency	Candidate	Votes	Pct	Opponent(s)	Votes	Pct	Ballots cast	Majority	Turnout
2020	N03 Pitas	Ruddy Awah (IND)	2,918	40.14%	Sufian Abd Karim (Sabah UMNO)	2,359	32.44%	7,270	559	66.53%
2020	N03 Pitas	Ruddy Awah (IND)	2,918	40.14%	Shariff Azman Shariff Along (WARISAN)	1,565	21.53%	7,270	559	66.53%
2020	N03 Pitas	Ruddy Awah (IND)	2,918	40.14%	Sh Sahar Sh Ading (PCS)	314	4.32%	7,270	559	66.53%
2020	N03 Pitas	Ruddy Awah (IND)	2,918	40.14%	Ilasam Nurkasim (USNO Baru)	114	1.57%	7,270	559	66.53%
2025	N03 Pitas	Ruddy Awah (GAGASAN)	5,754	47.57%	Harun Ismail (WARISAN)	4,189	34.63%	12,329	1,565	70.23%
2025	N03 Pitas	Ruddy Awah (GAGASAN)	5,754	47.57%	Bolkiah Ismail (Sabah UMNO)	1,331	11.00%	12,329	1,565	70.23%
2025	N03 Pitas	Ruddy Awah (GAGASAN)	5,754	47.57%	Kinchin Boluot (IMPIAN)	425	3.51%	12,329	1,565	70.23%
2025	N03 Pitas	Ruddy Awah (GAGASAN)	5,754	47.57%	Abdul Hamid Kimin (KDM)	266	2.20%	12,329	1,565	70.23%
2025	N03 Pitas	Ruddy Awah (GAGASAN)	5,754	47.57%	Nazri Santong (IND)	131	1.08%	12,329	1,565	70.23%

== Honours ==
- Sabah
  - Justice of Peace of Sabah (JP) (2015)
- Pahang
  - Knight Grand Companion of the Order of Sultan Ahmad Shah of Pahang (SSAP) – Dato' Sri
