= Sabah F.C. (Malaysia) =

Malaysian football club

Sabah
- Full name: Sabah Football Club
- Nickname: The Rhinos
- Founded: 1950; 76 years ago, as North Borneo FA; 1963; 63 years ago, as Sabah FA; 2021; 5 years ago, as Sabah Football Club
- Ground: Likas Stadium
- Capacity: 35,000
- Owner: Sabah Football Club Sdn Bhd
- CEO: YB Datuk Ir. Shahelmey bin Yahya
- Head coach: Juan Torres Garrido
- League: Malaysia Super League
- 2025–26: Malaysia Super League, 9th of 13
- Website: sabah-fc.com
Home colours	Away colours

Sabah Football Club (Malay: Kelab Bolasepak Sabah) is a Malaysian professional football club owned by the Sabah Football Club Sdn Bhd. The club represents the state of Sabah in Borneo, and competes in the Malaysia Super League, the top tier of Malaysian football. Their home matches are played at the 35,000-capacity Likas Stadium in Kota Kinabalu, the capital city of Sabah.

Throughout its history, Sabah has won the Malaysia FA Cup in 1995, the Malaysian Premier League (top tier) in 1996, the Malaysia Premier League (second tier) in 2019, and also won the MFL Challenge Cup in 2026 as Sabah FC. Continentally in 1995, Sabah FA also advanced to the second round of the Asian Cup Winners' Cup after defeating An Giang of V. League 3–1 on aggregate. They lost to Bellmare Hiratsuka (now Shonan Bellmare) of J1 League 1–7 on aggregate.

Until 2021, Sabah FA, also known as Sabah FA State Football Team, was one of the 14 state teams in the Malaysian football system. It was funded and managed by the SAFA. However, the Malaysian football league mandated that all the top two leagues must be professional, leading to the privatisation of SAFA and officially owned by a private company named Sabah Football Club Sdn Bhd, proceeded to renamed the club as "Sabah Football Club".

== History ==
=== Early years as North Borneo (1950–1963) ===
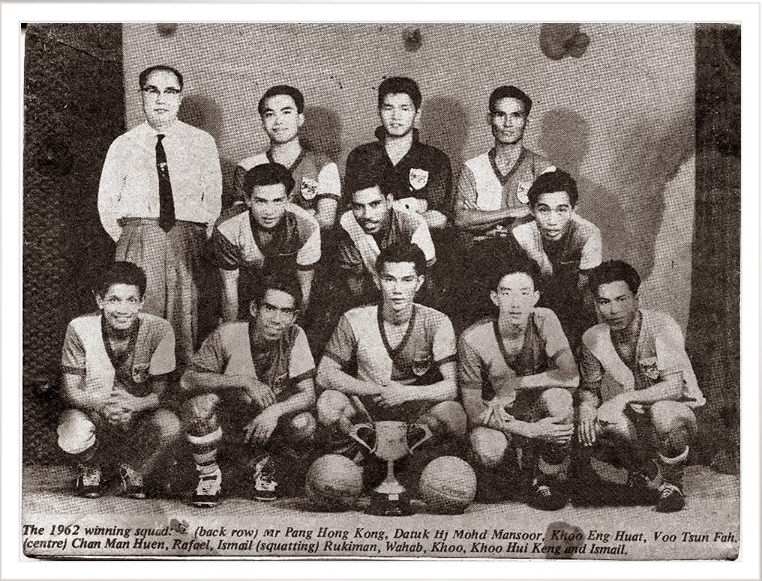
A photo of the North Borneo football team who were winners of the first edition of the Borneo Cup tournament in 1962, just one year before the formation of the Federation of Malaysia in which the team's homeland North Borneo became a part of the country in 1963. The North Borneo territory also changed its name to the Malaysian region of Sabah after the formation of the country and the team followed suit by changing its name to the Sabah FA State Football Team.

From the 1950s until 1963, the team represented North Borneo in the Borneo Cup, competing against Sarawak FA and Brunei FA. North Borneo won the inaugural edition of the tournament in 1962. Following the formation of the Federation of Malaysia in 1963, North Borneo became part of Malaysia and was renamed Sabah. the North Borneo Football Association (NBFA) changed its name to Sabah Football Association (Sabah FA) to reflect the territory's new status.

=== Amateur and semi-professional era (1963–1994) ===
Sabah established itself as a competitive force in Malaysian football during the amateur and semi-professional eras. The team entered the Malaysia Cup in 1978 after qualifying for the competition for the first time in 1977. During the 1979 Malaysian League season, Sabah recovered from a slow start to win its remaining matches, recording several significant victories, including an 8–0 win over Sarawak FA, an 11–0 victory against Perak FA and a 6–1 win over Terengganu FA. Sabah FA finished as runners-up behind Singapore FA and scored 49 goals in 12 matches, making it the league's highest-scoring team that season.

During the 1980s, Sabah became one of the prominent teams in Malaysian football, with players such as James Wong, Hassan Sani and Peter Rajah contributing to the team's reputation. These players led Sabah to become one of Malaysian football's most feared teams during the 80's. Sabah also hosted notable international opponents during this period. On 10 June 1981, a Sabah Invitation team played a friendly match against English club Manchester United.

Sabah continued to produce notable players in the following decade. In 1991, striker Matlan Marjan became the first Malaysian player to score twice against England in an international 'A' match, achieving the feat during Malaysia's encounter with the England national team.

A friendly match poster between Sabah Invitation and Manchester United on 10 June 1981.

=== Professional era and domestic success (1994–2000) ===
When professional football was introduced by Football Association of Malaysia (FAM), Sabah made a reputation of being one of the Malaysian League's most competitive sides. Quality players were produced from the ranks during the 1990s, most notably Matlan who helped Sabah finish as runners-up during 1993 and 1994 Malaysia FA Cup, and who at one time was appointed as the national team captain by Claude Le Roy. The positive results were cut short by the match fixing scandal in 1994. Matlan was the one of several players found guilty. As a punishment for their involvement in match fixing, he and the other players were banned for life by FIFA and banished from the state of Sabah under the Restricted Residence Act. After the scandal, Sabah began its rebuilding process. Sabah won their first professional trophy, the 1995 FA Cup. In the 1996 season, Sabah won their first league title and went through to the final of the Cup for the first time, but were beaten by Selangor on penalties. Sabah then reached the final of the 1998 Malaysia FA Cup.

=== Relegation and continued cup runs (2000–2003) ===
The 2000 season could be considered as Sabah's worst since joining the Malaysian professional league as they were relegated to the second division, and could not get past the group stages of the Malaysia Cup. However, Sabah quickly regained its performance in the 2001 season where they finished as runners-up behind Johor FC. In the 2002 season, Sabah was lining up players of calibre such as Zainizam Marjan, Khairul Azman Mohamed and Josiah Seton, finishing third in the league and again managed to get through to the final of Malaysia Cup by beating Selangor Public Bank and Perak. Sabah however finished as runners-up yet again by losing to the same team that beat them in 1996 final, Selangor. This time, Sabah lost by golden goal scored by Amri Yahyah. In 2003, Sabah again finished third in Liga Premier One. They reached the final of Malaysia Cup. This time they lost to club-side MPPJ by 0–3, with hat-trick from Juan Manuel Arostegui.

=== Early years in the Malaysian Super League (2004–2007) ===
When the Malaysia Super League (MSL) was introduced in 2004, Sabah struggled to be competitive against other teams in the top league. Sabah only managed to stay in Super League for two seasons as they were relegated to the Malaysia Premier League (MPL) in 2005. After the relegation, Sabah continued to struggle for promotion. They lost to Pahang in the 2007 season play-off.

=== Return to the Super League and relegation (2008–2012) ===
After 6 years in the 2nd tier MPL, Australian head coach Gary Phillips was able to guide Sabah to promotion in 2010 in his first season in charge. After poor results which have affected Sabah's performance in 2011, Gary Phillips was replaced by local head coach Justin Ganai to save Sabah from relegation zone. Justin improved Sabah performance in the 2011 Malaysia Cup where the team reached the quarter-finals. He was retained as for the 2012 season but step down eventually. Sabah got relegated back to the Malaysia Premier League after losing to Kedah. Salt was added to the wound as the relegation was followed by them failing to qualify to the group stage of the 2012 Malaysia Cup.

=== Return of foreign players and rebuilding (2013–2018) ===
Sabah started their 2013 season back in the Malaysia Premier League as their main defenders Ronny Harun and Mafry Balang left and Rozaimi Abdul Rahman was loaned out to Harimau Muda A. 2013 season was led by Northern Irishman head coach David McCreery and they end up in 5th place, but lost the Malaysia Cup play-off 0–4 to Negeri Sembilan at Shah Alam Stadium. McCreery left at the end of the season. The year 2014 saw a major changes in the team's sponsorship by which local brand Carino was signed as their kit supplier and Ararat Sports plus BSA as their sponsor. During this season, former Sabah player Milomir Šešlija become their head coach, replacing McCreery in the hot seat. They finished 8th out of 12 in the MPL, missed the Malaysia Cup group stage for third consecutive seasons and also got out of the FA Cup in the early stage.

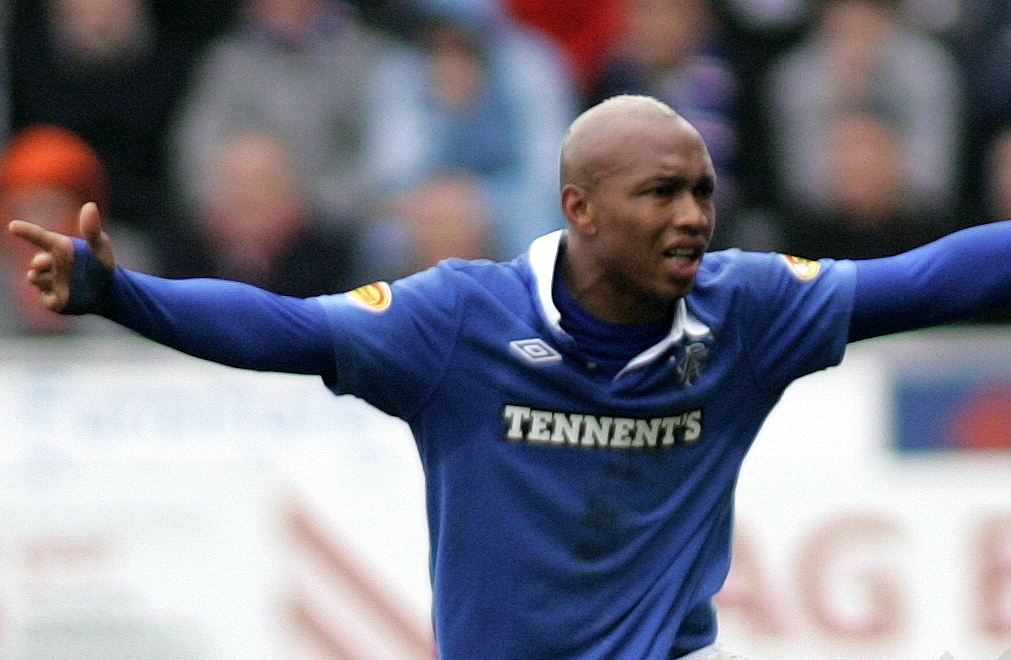
Former Liverpool and Senegal player, El Hadji Diouf played for Sabah from 2014 to 2015.

Just after 2014 season finished, another major change was made by which George O'Callaghan was signed as their technical director. Sabah FA successfully signed twice African 'Player of The Year' El Hadji Diouf and his compatriot Abdoulaye Faye, followed by Irish-born Libyan footballer, Éamon Zayed and Singaporean Fazrul Nawaz. Fazrul and O'Callaghan were released early in the season few weeks before Malaysia Premier League kick off. Fazrul was replaced by Joel Chianese during the mid-season transfer window, and O'Callaghan by Brisbane Roar ex-coach Mike Mulvey in February 2015. Diouf's dissatisfaction grew with Sabah FA management plans, along with his dismissal during few of Sabah's matches thus allowing youngster Leopold Alphonso and Rawilson Batuil to play. Promising start of 2015 season ended with disappointment at 7th place, missing Malaysia Cup automatic slot. TC Goh, Mulvey and big name players such as Diouf, Zayed, Faye, Chianese and Rozaimi Abdul Rahman left at the end of the season due to no contract renewal.

=== Malaysia Premier League champions (2019) ===
Following much efforts and various reorganisation made on the team, Sabah FA was crowned as the champion of the 2019 Malaysia Premier League for the first time since they last lifted the old first division title back in 1996. Having early secured various imports such as Brazilian Luiz Júnior, South Korean Park Tae-soo and Serbian Luka Milunović, Aguinaldo da Veiga, Ahmet Ataýew, Rodoljub Paunović and various local talents, the team was able to win 13 from a total of 19 matches, qualifying for the 2020 Malaysia Super League.

=== Privatisation and rebranding (2020–2021) ===
Starting from the 2021 season, all clubs competing in the Malaysia Super League must be privatised as required by the FAM. Sabah Football Club Sdn Bhd was formed in order to fulfill the condition. Verdon Bahanda was appointed as the chief executive officer (CEO) of the club on 12 November 2020. Therefore, Sabah FA was renamed to Sabah Football Club as the new club name, and the rhino once again became the official mascot of the club.

=== Return to continental competition (2022–2024) ===
Sabah finished third in the 2022 Malaysia Super League, which saw them return to the continental club competition since 1995–96 and make their debut in the 2023–24 AFC Cup in Group H with Haiphong, Hougang United and PSM Makassar. On 21 September, they played their first fixture against Hougang United in a 3–1 home win. In the next fixture, Sabah faced PSM Makassar away, where they won 5–0 with Saddil Ramdani bagging a hat-trick of assists. Their journey ended in the ASEAN Zonal semi-final, where they faced Macarthur FC and were ultimately defeated 0–3.

=== Recent developments (2025–present) ===
In preparation for the 2025–26 season, Sabah strengthened its squad by signing New Zealand international Dane Ingham from Newcastle Jets and Dean Pelekanos from Western Sydney Wanderers. These signings formed part of the club's efforts to reinforce its squad for domestic competition. The club also saw itself return to Adidas as the club's apparel partner in 2016.

== Team image ==
=== Supporters group ===
- Bola Sepak Sabah
- Football Fans of Sabah
- Kelab Penyokong Sabah Rhino
- North Borneo Ultras (NBU)
- Sabah Football Fans Club
- SabahRhinos.com since 1997
- Tawau City Hoodlum (TCH)
- The Rhinos Troops
- Sabah Diehard
- The Voice of Rhinos#12
- RedBois City (RBC)
- Universiti Malaysia Sabah (UMS)
- Bola Rhinos Official

=== Rivalries ===
Historically, since 1970 until 2019, Sabah's grand old neighboring rivals was Sarawak FA (later renamed as Sarawak FC) also referred to as The Grand Borneo Derby. Since 2020 Malaysian football era, Sabah’s neighboring rivals are DPMM FC and Kuching City with these matches commonly referred to as the Borneo Derby.

=== Mascot ===
Sabah FA first mascot was the rhinoceros since mid-1990s. In 2010 the SAFA rebranded the mascot to hawk. which was controversial as Kuala Lumpur FA at that time was also known as the Hawks. Sabah FA reinstated the Rhinoceros mascot starting from 2015. In 2019, Sabah FA once again rebranded the mascot as Tambadau. Following the 2021 privatisation process,Sabah FC was chosen as the new club name and the rhinoceros once again became the official mascot.

=== Broadcasting ===
Malaysia Super League and other cup matches are broadcast live on Astro Arena and on the Astro Go and Sooka streaming platforms, while radio coverages regular season matches on RTM Sabah FM 89.9 in Malay language.

=== Ownership and finances ===
In November 2020 following the privatisation of the club, Sabah displayed the club's new official logo which was chosen following a competition. During the time, Sabah Football Club Sdn Bhd in its statement informed that the logo was created by an individual named Firzaruddin Zainal Abiddin. Apart from fulfilling the design requirements, the logo was chosen by the most fans.

== Stadium ==
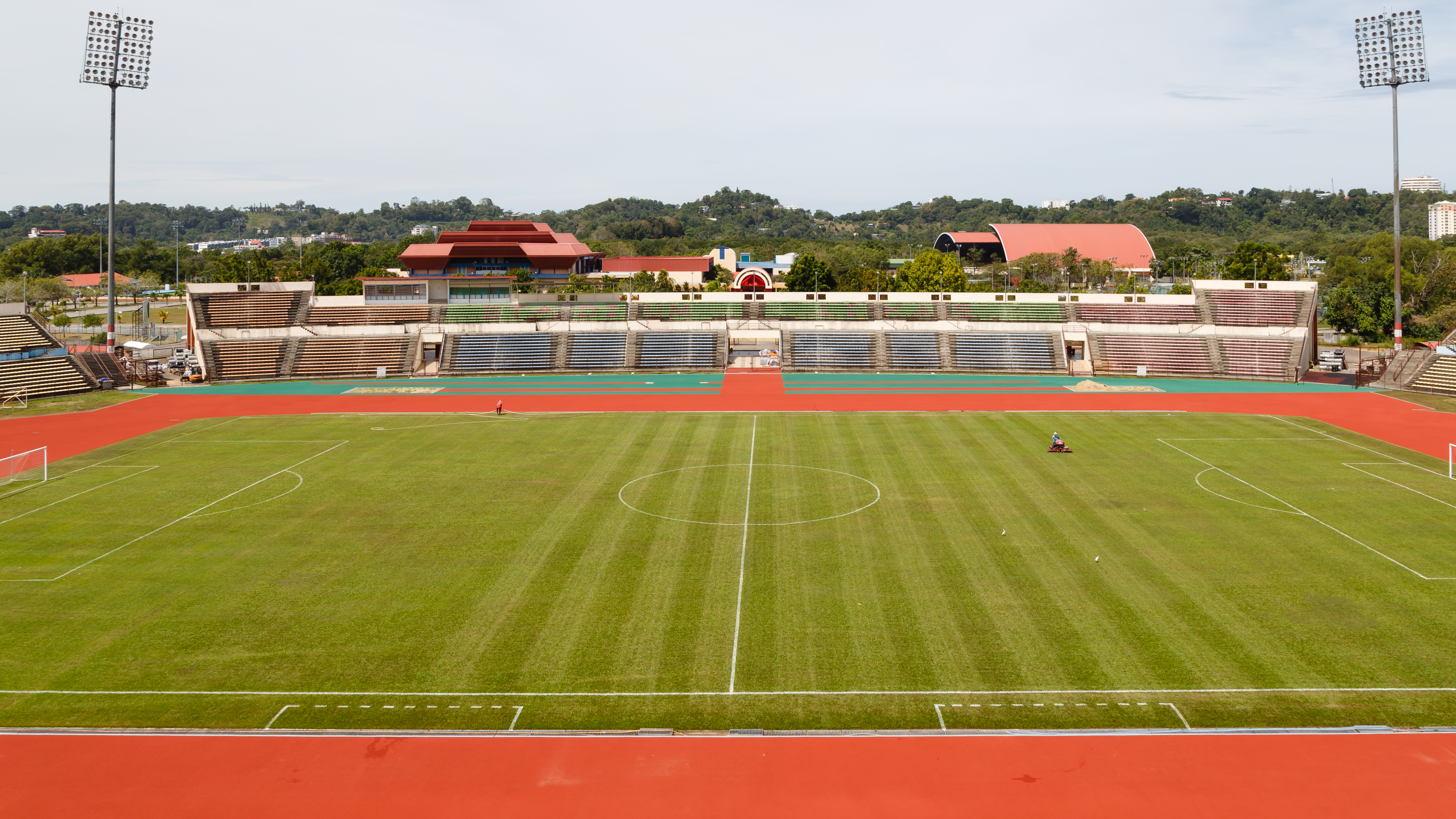
Likas Stadium, the home stadium for Sabah.

- Likas Stadium - (official home stadium)
- Penampang Stadium - (Sometimes)
- Keningau Stadium - (Sometimes)
- Sandakan Stadium - (Sometimes)
- Tawau Stadium - (Sometimes)

Likas Stadium is the current official main home ground for Sabah. It has a capacity of 22,000, making it the 8th largest football stadium in Malaysia in terms of seating capacity. It has been the home stadium of Sabah since its opening in 1983.

== Kit suppliers and shirt sponsors ==
Since 2004, many companies from outside of the State of Sabah sponsored Sabah Football Association and later sponsoring the Sabah Football Club Sdn Bhd since 2021.

Season	Manufacturer	Main Sponsor
2004	(France) Line 7	(Malaysia) Dunhill
2005	(France) Line 7	(Malaysia) TM
2005–06	(France) Line 7	(Malaysia) TM Net
2006–07	(France) Line 7	(Malaysia) Celcom, TMnet
2007–08	(France) Line 7	(Malaysia) Celcom
2009	(France) Line 7	(Malaysia) Streamyx
2010	(Malaysia) Carino	(Malaysia) TM
2011	(Germany) Adidas	No sponsors
2012	(Germany) Adidas	No sponsors
2013	(Germany) Adidas	(Malaysia) Grace One Sports
2014	(Malaysia) Carino	(Malaysia) BSA
2015	(Germany) Adidas	(Malaysia) Globaltec
2016	(Germany) Adidas	(Malaysia) Sabah Energy (Malaysia) Asian Supply Base
2017	(Malaysia) Carino	(Malaysia) Sabah Energy (Malaysia) Asian Supply Base
2018	(Malaysia) Carino	(Malaysia) Sabah Energy (Malaysia) Asian Supply Base
2019	(Malaysia) Carino	No sponsors
2020	(Malaysia) Carino	No sponsors
2021	(Italy) Lotto	(Malaysia) Warisan Harta Sabah (Malaysia) Sabah Net
2022	(Italy) Lotto	(Malaysia) RedOne
2023	(Italy) Lotto	(Malaysia) Sawit Kinabalu (Malaysia) RedOne (AFC Cup)
2024–2025	(Italy) Lotto	(Malaysia) Jetama
2025–2026	(Germany) Adidas	(Malaysia) Sawit Kinabalu
2026–present	(Malaysia) Carino	(Malaysia) Emas Sri Semantan (Malaysia) Sawit Kinabalu

== Players ==
=== First-team squad ===
As of 29 August 2026

Note: Flags indicate national team as defined under FIFA eligibility rules; some limited exceptions apply. Players may hold more than one non-FIFA nationality.

No.	Pos.	Nation	Player
1	GK	MAS	Ramzi Mustakim
2	DF	MAS	Hanafie Tokyo
3	DF	MAS	Rawilson Batuil
5	MF	PHI	Oskari Kekkonen
7	MF	ARG	Gonzalo Di Renzo
8	MF	MAS	Farhan Roslan
9	FW	KOR	Park Jung-bin
10	MF	ESP	Cifu
13	DF	MAS	Dinesh Rajasingam
14	DF	ESP	José Martin
17	FW	JPN	Sho Yamamoto
18	MF	MAS	Abdul Halim Saari
20	MF	MAS	Fadzrul Danel

No.	Pos.	Nation	Player
21	MF	MAS	Fayadh Zulkifli
22	GK	ARG	Juan Flere
23	DF	NZL	Dane Ingham
28	FW	MAS	Darren Lok
31	GK	MAS	Damien Lim
34	DF	ESP	Cadete
70	MF	MAS	Fakrul Iman
72	DF	MAS	Shahrulnizam Abdullah
76	DF	MAS	Rozacklye Yanam
88	MF	MAS	Rusdi Roslan

== Management and staff ==
As of 29 August 2026

Position	Name
Team Manager	(Malaysia) Arziz Afizy Rumsani
Assistant Manager	(Malaysia) Andrew Laban
Head coach	(Spain) Juan Torres Garrido
Assistant coach	(Malaysia) Alto Linus
Assistant coach	(Malaysia) Johnny Dominicus
Fitness coach	(Slovakia) Martin Stano
Goalkeeper coach	(Malaysia) Rozaimie Rohim
Team Doctor	(Malaysia) Wan Sherhan Wan Ilias
Physio	(Malaysia) Halmond Ting
Physio	(Malaysia) Maxson Michael
Masseur	(Malaysia) Abd Al-Aziz Mohamed Razi
Team Analyst	(Malaysia) Idham Anuar
Kitman	(Malaysia) Jamal Damin
Kitman	(Malaysia) Azmi Jemlan

== Honours ==
Type	Competition	Titles	Seasons
Domestic	Liga Perdana 1/Malaysia Super League (First division)	1	1996
Domestic	Malaysia Premier League (Second division)	1	2019
Domestic	Malaysia FA Cup	1	1995
Domestic	MFL Challenge Cup	1	2026
Domestic	Borneo Cup	13	1962, 1963, 1967, 1969, 1970, 1971, 1972 1977, 1978, 1979, 1980, 1984, 1985

Bold is for those competition that are currently active.

== Award winners ==
=== Domestic ===
- Best Young Player of the Season
  - (Malaysia) Rozaimi Rahman (2012)
- Team of the Season
  - (South Korea) Park Tae Su (2023)

== Notable players ==
As of 2026–27 season.

=== International capped players ===
AFC/OFC.: (Australia) Michael Baird; (Australia) Scott Ollerenshaw; (Hong Kong) Tim Bredbury; (Indonesia) Dedi Kusnandar; (Indonesia) Saddil Ramdani; (New Zealand) Dane Ingham; (Singapore) Fazrul Nawaz; (South Korea) Lee Kil-Hoon; (Turkmenistan) Ahmet Ataýew	CAF.: (Angola) Aguinaldo; (Cameroon) Alexis Tibidi; (Cameroon) Émile Mbouh; (Gabon) Lévy Madinda; (Guinea-Bissau) José Embaló; (Liberia) Jerome Suku Doe; (Liberia) Joseph Amoah; (Liberia) Josiah Seton; (Liberia) Sam Johnson; (Libya) Éamon Zayed; (Namibia) Paulus Shipanga; (Namibia) Petrus Shitembi; (Senegal) Abdoulaye Faye; (Senegal) El Hadji Diouf; (South Africa) Dumisa Ngobe; (Zambia) Francis Kasonde; (Zambia) Gift Kampamba	UEFA.: (Bosnia and Herzegovina) Ajdin Mujagić; (Croatia) Zdravko Šimić; (Czech Republic) Jaroslav Netolička; (England) David Rocastle; (France) Sofiane Choubani; (Greece) Haris Stamboulidis; (North Macedonia) Risto Mitrevski; (Serbia) Luka Milunović; (Wales) Rhys Weston	CONMEBOL/ CONCACAF.: (Brazil) Luiz Júnior; (Puerto Rico) Héctor Ramos; (Saint Kitts and Nevis) Keith Gumbs

== Managerial history ==
=== Managers ===
- (Malaysia) Goh Thian Chuan (1999, 2015)
- (Malaysia) Osman Jamal (2000–2001)
- (Malaysia) Mohd Joehari Mohd Ayub (2004–2005)
- (Malaysia) Abdul Rahman Zakaria (2006–2009, 2014)
- (Malaysia) Mohd Asyraaf Fong Abdullah (2009)
- (Australia) Gary Phillips (2010–2011)
- (Malaysia) Shahriman Abdullah (2011–2012)
- (Malaysia) Alijus Sipil (2013–2014)
- (Algeria) Adlane Messelem (2017)
- (Malaysia) Juil Nuatim (2018)
- (Malaysia) Peter Anthony (2018–2020)
- (Malaysia) Jelius Ating (2020–2022)
- (Malaysia) Shahelmey Yahya (2023–present)

=== Head Coaches ===
- (Malaysia) Stanley Chew (–1979, 1985, 1987–1988)
- (West Germany) Gerd Schmidt (1980–1983)
- (Malaysia) James Wong (1984)
- (Malaysia) Azah Ezrein (1986)
- (England) Frank Upton (1989–1990)
- (England) Roy Lorenson (1990–1992)
- (Czech Republic) Oldřich Sedláček (1992–1995)
- (Malaysia) Kelly Tham (1995–1996)
- (Australia) (England) Ron Smith (1996–1997)
- (England) Ken Shellito (1998)
- (Malaysia) Justin Ganai (1999, 2005–2006, 2011–2012, 2015)
- (Australia) Ken Worden (1999)
- (England) David Woodfield (2000–2001)
- (England) Peter Butler (2001–2004)
- (Portugal) José Garrido (2004–2005)
- (Portugal) José Luis (2005)
- (Croatia) Drago Mamić (2007–2008)
- (Iraq) Wathiq Naji (2008–2009)
- (Malaysia) Mohd Asyraaf Fong Abdullah (2009)
- (Australia) Gary Phillips (2010–2011)
- (Malaysia) Andrew Majjangkim (2012)
- (Northern Ireland) David McCreery (2012–2013)
- (Malaysia) Johnny Dominicus (2013)
- (Bosnia and Herzegovina) Milomir Šešlija (2013–2014)
- (England) Mike Mulvey (2015)
- (Croatia) Vjeran Simunić (2015–2016)
- (France) Steve Vilmiaire (2016–2017)
- (Malaysia) Jelius Ating (2017–2019)
- (Indonesia) Kurniawan Dwi Yulianto (2020, 2021)
- (Malaysia) Lucas Kalang Laeng (2020)
- (Malaysia) Burhan Ajui (caretaker)
- (Malaysia) Ong Kim Swee (2021–2024)
- (Slovakia) Martin Stano (2024–2025)
- (Australia) Jean-Paul de Marigny (2025)
- (Malaysia) Alto Linus (2025–2026)
- (Spain) Juan Torres Garrido (2026–present)

=== Head Coaches with titles ===
The following head coaches won at least one trophy when in charge of Sabah:

Name	Period	1st Trophy	Other Trophies
(Malaysia) Kelly Tham	1995–1996	1995 Malaysia FA Cup	–
(Australia) (England) Ron Smith	1996–1998	1996 Premier League	–
(Malaysia) Jelius Ating	2017–2019	2019 Malaysia Premier League	–
(Spain) Juan Torres Garrido	2026–present	2026 MFL Challenge Cup	–

== Season by season record ==
As of 28 May 2023

Note:

- Pld = Played, W = Won, D = Drawn, L = Lost, F = Goals for, A = Goals against, Pts= Points, Pos = Position

1st or Champions 2nd or Runner-up 3rd place Relegation

Season	League										Cup			Asia	
Season	Division	Pld	W	D	L	F	A	D	Pts	Pos	Charity	Malaysia	FA	Competition	Result
1995	Liga Perdana	28	13	5	10	60	45	+15	44	5th	–	Semi-finals	Champions	Asian Cup Winners' Cup	Round of 16
1996	Liga Perdana	28	17	7	4	49	21	+28	58	1st	Runner-up	Runner-up	Quarter-finals	–	–
1997	Liga Perdana	28	14	7	7	42	28	+14	49	3rd	–	Group stage	2nd round	–	–
1998	Perdana 1	22	8	7	7	22	26	–4	31	5th	–	Semi-finals	Runners-up	–	–
1999	Perdana 1	18	6	7 (Note: Draw were followed by penalty shootouts for an additional point.)	5	20	20	+0	29	4th	–	Group stage	Semi-finals	–	–
2000	Perdana 1	22	4	4	14	22	41	–19	16	11th	–	Group stage	1st round	–	–
2001	Perdana 2	22	14	3	5	41	22	+19	45	2nd	–	Group stage	Semi-finals	–	–
2002	Perdana 1	26	13	8	5	48	30	+18	47	3rd	–	Runner-up	Quarter-finals	–	–
2003	Perdana 1	24	10	8	6	34	22	+12	38	4th	–	Runner-up	Semi-finals	–	–
2004	Super League	21	4	5	12	22	35	–13	17	6th	–	Semi-finals	Quarter-finals	–	–
2005	Super League	21	6	4	11	25	39	–14	22	8th	–	Group stage	Quarter-finals	–	–
2005–06	Premier League	21	7	7	7	32	31	+1	28	4th	–	Group stage	1st round	–	–
2006–07	Premier League	20	6	9	5	26	21	+5	27	5th	–	Semi-finals	Quarter-finals	–	–
2007–08	Premier League	24	13	5	6	48	27	+21	44	4th	–	Group stage	Quarter-finals	–	–
2009	Premier League	24	5	7	12	18	31	–13	22	9th	–	Group stage	1st round	–	–
2010	Premier League	22	15	3	4	42	14	+28	48	2nd	–	Group stage	1st round	–	–
2011	Super League	26	7	7	12	24	32	–8	28	10th	–	Quarter-finals	1st round	–	–
2012	Super League	26	7	7	12	33	52	–19	28	13th	–	Not qualified	1st round	–	–
2013	Premier League	22	9	3	10	42	46	–4	30	5th	–	Not qualified	2nd round	–	–
2014	Premier League	22	6	6	10	21	30	–9	24	7th	–	Not qualified	2nd round	–	–
2015	Premier League	22	8	3	11	37	42	–5	27	7th	–	Not qualified	1st round	–	–
2016	Premier League	22	5	5	12	26	41	–15	20	9th	–	Not qualified	3rd round	–	–
2017	Premier League	22	9	3	10	33	38	–5	30	7th	–	Not qualified	Quarter-finals	–	–
2018	Premier League	20	7	7	6	35	26	+9	28	6th	–	Semi-finals	2nd round	–	–
2019	Premier League	20	13	4	3	33	17	+16	43	1st	–	Group Stage	2nd round	–	–
2020	Super League	11	2	3	6	12	24	–12	9	10th	–	Cancelled	Cancelled	–	–
2021	Super League	22	4	7	11	21	38	–17	19	9th	–	–	Not held	–	–
2022	Super League	22	13	3	6	36	26	10	42	3rd	–	Semi-finals	Quarter-finals	–	–
2023	Super League	26	17	3	6	64	33	31	54	3rd	–	Quarter-finals	Quarter-finals	AFC Cup	Zonal semi-finals
2024–25	Super League	24	11	7	6	41	33	8	40	3rd	_	Semi-final	Quarter-finals	_	_
2025–26	Super League	24	5	8	11	29	44	−15	23	9th	_	Round of 16	Runners-up	_	_

== Performances in AFC competitions ==
- Asian Cup Winners' Cup: 1 appearance

1995: Round of 16

- AFC Cup: 1 appearance

2023–24: ASEAN Zonal semi-finals

Season	Competition	Round	Opponent	Home	Away	Aggregate
1995	Asian Cup Winners' Cup	First round	(Vietnam) An Giang	3–0	0–1	3–1
1995	Asian Cup Winners' Cup	Second round	(Japan) Bellmare Hiratsuka	1–2	0–5	1–7
2023–24	AFC Cup	Group H	(Singapore) Hougang United	3–1	4–1	1st out of 4
2023–24	AFC Cup	Group H	(Indonesia) PSM Makassar	1–3	5–0	1st out of 4
2023–24	AFC Cup	Group H	(Vietnam) Hải Phòng	4–1	2–3	1st out of 4
2023–24	AFC Cup	ASEAN Zonal semi-finals	(Australia) Macarthur	0–3		
