= Sabah Football Association =

Malaysian football association

Sabah Football Association Persatuan Bolasepak Sabah
- Founded: 1950; 76 years ago as North Borneo Football Association
- Purpose: Football association
- Headquarters: Likas Stadium
- Location: Kota Kinabalu, Sabah, Malaysia
- President: YB Datuk Ir. Shahelmey bin Yahya

Sabah Amateur Football Association, operating as Sabah Football Association (SAFA; Malay: Persatuan Bolasepak Negeri Sabah) is the governing body of football for the state of Sabah, Malaysia. SAFA is responsible for coordinating and developing regional football with the Football Association of Malaysia (FAM) as the official governing body of football in Malaysia. In 2021, members of the association founded a company named Sabah Football Club Sdn Bhd, that has control over Sabah FC.

== History ==
=== Origins ===
From the 1950s to 1963, Sabah competed as the North Borneo football team in the Borneo Cup together with the Sarawak football team and the Brunei national football team. Following the formation of the Malaysian Federation, the North Borneo Football Association (NBFA) changed its name to the Sabah Football Association (Sabah FA). Sabah qualified for the Malaysia Cup for the first time in 1977.

== Association management ==
Positions	Name
President	(Malaysia) YB Datuk Ir. Shahelmey bin Yahya
Deputy president	(Malaysia) Datuk Khairul Firdaus Akhbar Khan
Deputy president	(Malaysia) Datuk Awang Kadin Tang
Vice president	(Malaysia) Rafie Robert
Vice president	(Malaysia) Datuk Alijus Sipil
Vice president	(Malaysia) Datuk Fairuz Renddan
Vice president	(Malaysia) Datuk Ruddy Awah
Vice president	(Malaysia) Marasun Hassim
General secretary	(Malaysia) Encik Shamsuddin Mohd Shah
Treasurer	(Malaysia)
Executive committee members	(Malaysia) Mohd Arziz Afizy Rumsani
Executive committee members	(Malaysia) Mohd Arzahri Abd Rahman
Executive committee members	(Malaysia) Mohd Rafiuddin Gulisan
Executive committee members	(Malaysia) Abd Aziz Mohd Ibno
Executive committee members	(Malaysia) Datuk Razak Sulaiman
Executive committee members	(Malaysia) Yuszaimie Abdullah
Executive committee members	(Malaysia) Jackson Taguah
Executive committee members	(Malaysia) Rosman Hussain

== Presidents ==
Years	Name
June 2018–October 2020	(Malaysia) Peter Anthony
December 2020–	(Malaysia) YB Datuk Ir. Shahelmey bin Yahya

== Competitions ==
The Sabah Football Association organises the Sabah Football League for its regional level clubs.

== Affiliated ==
=== Private companies affiliation ===
Private companies and sponsorships affiliated to the Sabah Football Association include:

- (Malaysia) Sabah Football Club Sdn Bhd (owned 80%, other Sabah corps owned 20%)
- (Malaysia) (Sabah) Sawit Kinabalu
- (Malaysia) (Pahang) Emas Sri Semantan (contracted: 2026)
- (Malaysia) (Johor) SNE Sports - Sports Digital News & Broadcast Agency
- (Malaysia) (Sabah) Jetama Sdn Bhd
- (Malaysia) Sabah Maju Jaya Ltd.
- (Malaysia) Sabah Electric Sdn Bhd
- (Malaysia) (Sabah) Carino Athletic (ARARAT Sdn Bhd)
- (Malaysia) (Sabah) Verdon Bahanda Corp. (contracted:2021-2022)
- (Malaysia) Sabah Maju Jaya Petroleum Sdn Bhd

=== Football clubs affiliation ===
All-time clubs in the league competitions affiliated to the Sabah Football Association include:

- (Malaysia) Sabah FC
- (Malaysia) Sabah FA Futsal
- (Malaysia) Sabah FA Women
- (Malaysia) (Sabah) Kinabalu Jaguar F.C.
- (Malaysia) (Sabah) Cebagoo F.C.
- (Malaysia) (Sabah) Tawau Army F.A.
- (Malaysia) (Sabah) DYS F.C.
- (Malaysia) (Sabah) KDMM F.C.
- (Malaysia) (Sabah) Likas United F.C.
- (Malaysia) (Sabah) Merotai United F.C.
- (Malaysia) (Sabah) Indah United F.C.
- (Malaysia) (Sabah) PRESTA
- (Malaysia) (Sabah) Ranhill Powertron
- (Malaysia) (Sabah) Tenom Juta

== See also ==
- Piala Presiden
- Piala Belia
- History of Malaysian football
- Sabah Football Club Sdn Bhd
