= Dane Ingham =

New Zealand footballer

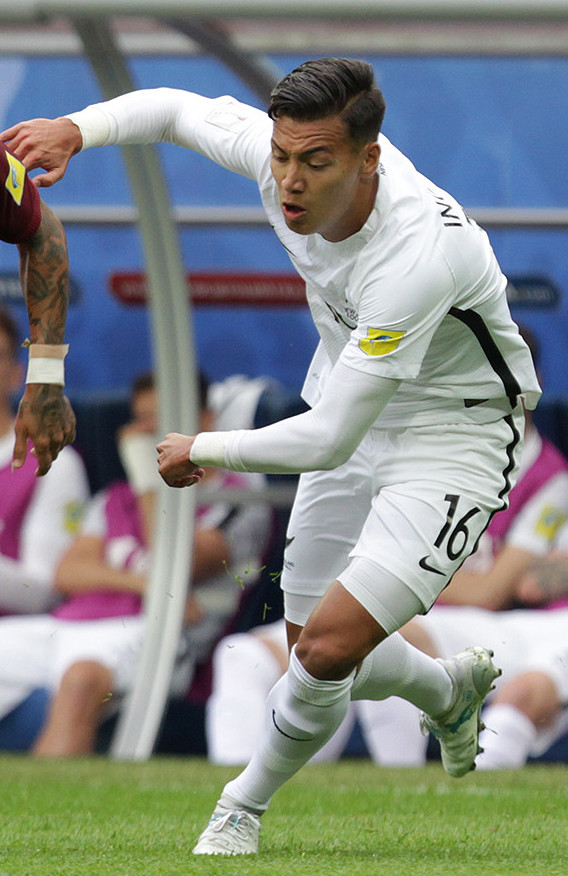
- Ingham with New Zealand at the 2017 FIFA Confederations Cup

Personal information
- Full name: Dane James Ingham
- Date of birth: 8 June 1999 (age 27)
- Place of birth: Lismore, New South Wales, Australia
- Height: 1.86 m (6 ft 1 in)
- Positions: Right back; winger

Team information
- Current team: Sabah
- Number: 23

Youth career
- Olympic FC

Senior career*
Years	Team	Apps	(Gls)
2015–2018	Brisbane Roar NPL	29	(2)
2017–2019	Brisbane Roar	19	(1)
2019–2021	Perth Glory	30	(3)
2021–2025	Newcastle Jets	87	(0)
2025–	Sabah	44	(1)

International career^{‡}
2017	New Zealand U-20	2	(0)
2021	New Zealand U-23	5	(0)
2017–	New Zealand	14	(0)
- * Club domestic league appearances and goals as of 13 May 2026 ‡ National team caps and goals as of 18 November 2024

Dane Ingham (born 8 June 1999) is a New Zealand professional footballer who plays as a right wing-back for Malaysia Super League club Sabah. Born and raised in Australia, he plays for the New Zealand national team. Mainly a right wing-back or right-back, Ingham can also play on the left or as a right winger.

== Club career ==
=== Brisbane Roar ===
Ingham made his professional debut in a 6–0 win against Global, in an AFC Champions League qualifier on 31 January 2017 at the age of 17 years, 5 months and 25 days. On his second appearance for Brisbane Roar, Dane scored his first goal against Perth Glory. In doing so he became the fourth youngest goal scorer in the A-League and the second youngest goal scorer for Brisbane Roar.

=== Perth Glory ===
On 25 June 2019, Ingham signed for Perth Glory.

On 22 June 2021 it was announced that Ingham would be leaving Perth Glory at the end of his contract after making 35 appearances for the club, scoring 3 goals.

=== Newcastle Jets ===
On 1 July 2021, Ingham was announced at Newcastle Jets on a two-year contract.

=== Sabah ===
On 16 June 2025, Ingham moved to Malaysia Super League club Sabah.

== International career ==
Eligible for Australia, New Zealand, or Samoa, Ingham was called up to the New Zealand national squad for World Cup qualifiers in March 2017, along with his brother Jai. He made his debut on 28 March 2017 against Fiji. Ingham was selected as part of the New Zealand squad for the 2017 FIFA Confederations Cup, playing all three games for the All Whites.

On 25 June 2021, Ingham was called up to the New Zealand squad for the delayed 2020 Summer Olympics.

== Personal life ==
Ingham is the younger brother of Jai Ingham. He is of Samoan descent through his mother.

== Career statistics ==
=== Club ===
Club	Season	Division	League		Cup		Continental		Other		Total	
Club	Season	Division	Apps	Goals	Apps	Goals	Apps	Goals	Apps	Goals	Apps	Goals
Brisbane Roar	2016–17	A-League	3	1	1	0	4 (Note: Appearance in AFC Champions League)	0	0	0	8	1
Brisbane Roar	2017–18	A-League	3	0	0	0	1	0	0	0	4	0
Brisbane Roar	2018–19	A-League	13	0	0	0	—		—		13	0
Brisbane Roar	Total		19	1	1	0	5	0	0	0	24	1
Perth Glory	2019–20	A-League	7	2	0	0	5	0	2 (Note: Appearances in A-League Finals)	0	14	2
Perth Glory	2020–21	A-League	14	1	0	0	—		—		14	1
Perth Glory	Total		21	3	0	0	5	0	2	0	28	3
Newcastle Jets	2021–22	A-League Men	23	0	2	0	—		—		25	0
Newcastle Jets	2022–23	A-League Men	16	0	1	0	—		—		14	1
Newcastle Jets	2023–24	A-League Men	27	0	2	0	—		—		29	0
Newcastle Jets	2024–25	A-League Men	13	0	3	0	—		—		16	0
Newcastle Jets	Total		79	0	8	0	0	0	0	0	87	0
Sabah	2025–26	Malaysia Super League	23	0	2	0	—		13 (Note: Seven appearances, one goal in Malaysia FA Cup; six appearances, one goal in MFL Challenge Cup)	2	38	2
Sabah	2026–27	Malaysia Super League	0	0	0	0	—		0	0	0	0
Sabah	Total		0	0	0	0	0	0	0	0	0	0
Career Total			86	4	4	0	10	0	2	0	102	4

== Honours ==
Player

Sabah F.C

2026 MFL Challenge Cup - Champions

2025 Malaysia FA Cup - Runners-up
