= Banggi (state constituency) =

Banggi (N01)
Sabah constituency
- Coordinates: 7.22292°N 117.17008°E

State constituency
- Legislature: Sabah State Legislative Assembly
MLA
Mohammad Mohamarin
GRS
- Constituency created: 1976
- First contested: 1976
- Last contested: 2025

Demographics
- Electors (2025): 9,484

Banggi is a state constituency in Sabah, Malaysia, that is represented in the Sabah State Legislative Assembly.

== Demographics ==
Ethnic breakdown of Banggi's electorate as of 2025
1. Muslim Bumiputera (72.0%)
2. Non-Muslim Bumiputera (27.0%)
3. Other ethnicities (0.51%)
4. Chinese (0.50%)

== History ==
As of 2020, Banggi has a population of 9,431 people.

=== Polling districts ===
According to the gazette issued on 31 October 2022, the Banggi constituency has a total of 14 polling districts.

State constituency	Polling Districts	Code	Location
Banggi（N01）	Limbuak	167/01/01	SK Limbuak
Banggi（N01）	Kapitangan	167/01/02	SK Kapitangan
Banggi（N01）	Sabur	167/01/03	SK Sabur
Banggi（N01）	Karakit	167/01/04	SK Karakit Banggi
Banggi（N01）	Malawali	167/01/05	SK Tanjung Manawali
Banggi（N01）	Balambangan	167/01/06	SK Balambangan Banggi
Banggi（N01）	Maliu	167/01/07	SK Padang
Banggi（N01）	Dagotan	167/01/08	SK Dogoton
Banggi（N01）	Lok Agong	167/01/09	SK Kapitangan
Banggi（N01）	Sebogoh	167/01/10	Balai Raya Kasingpitan Sebogoh
Banggi（N01）	Loktohog	167/01/11	SK Loktohog Banggi
Banggi（N01）	Lakisan	167/01/12	SK Lakisan
Banggi（N01）	Palak	167/01/13	SK Palak
Banggi（N01）	Tigabu	167/01/14	SK Pulau Tigabu

=== Representation history ===
Members of the Legislative Assembly for Banggi
Assembly	No	Years	Member	Party
Constituency created from Bengkoka-Banggi
4th	N01	1976–1981	Mustapha Harun	BN (USNO)
5th	N01	1981–1983	Abdul Salam Harun	USNO
6th	N01	1983–1985	Yahya Othman	BN (BERJAYA)
7th	N01	1985-1986	Amir Kahar	USNO
8th	N01	1986–1990	Amir Kahar	USNO
9th	N01	1990-1994	Amir Kahar	BN (USNO)
10th	N01	1994	Amir Kahar	GR (PBS)
10th	N01	1994-1999	Amir Kahar	BN (UMNO)
11th	N01	1999-2004	Amir Kahar	BN (UMNO)
12th	N01	2004–2008	Amir Kahar	BN (UMNO)
13th	N01	2008–2013	Abdul Mijul Unaini	BN (UMNO)
14th	N01	2013–2018	Abdul Mijul Unaini	BN (UMNO)
15th	N01	2018–2020	Mohammad Mohamarin	WARISAN
16th	N01	2020–2023	Mohammad Mohamarin	WARISAN
16th	N01	2023	Mohammad Mohamarin	Independent
16th	N01	2023-2025	Mohammad Mohamarin	GRS (GAGASAN)
17th	N01	2025–present	Mohammad Mohamarin	GRS (GAGASAN)

== Election results ==
*Concept of unreturned ballots were introduced in 1990 and not applicable for elections before 1990

Sabah state election, 2025
Party	Candidate	Votes	%	∆%
GRS	Mohammad Mohamarin	2,484	44.81	▲44.81
Heritage	Zainal Romio	1,178	21.25	▼24.64
Independent	Nasib Samodi	561	10.12	▲10.12
BN	Normalah Rasik	470	8.48	▼19.21
Sabah Dream Party	Among Timbul	371	6.69	▲6.69
PN	Rahimah Majid	296	5.34	▲5.34
Homeland Solidarity Party	Salbin Muksin	70	1.26	▲1.26
Independent	Hussin Masudin	29	0.52	▲0.52
Sabah Native Co-operation Party	Abdul Razak Abdul Salam	28	0.51	▲0.51
Sabah Nationality Party	Azlan Raymond @ Mauumah	26	0.47	▲0.47
Independent	Sakinolin Mohamad	25	0.45	▲0.45
PBK	Halman Mainuk	6	0.11	▲0.11
Total valid votes		5,544	100.00	
Total rejected ballots		162		
Unreturned ballots		2		
Turnout		5,708	60.18	▼6.27
Registered electors		9,485		
Majority		1,306	23.56	▲5.37
GRS gain from Sabah Heritage Party		Swing		?
Source(s) "RESULTS OF CONTESTED ELECTION AND STATEMENTS OF THE POLL AFTER THE OFFICIAL ADDITION OF VOTES" (PDF).

Sabah state election, 2020
Party	Candidate	Votes	%	∆%
Sabah Heritage Party	Mohammad Mohamarin	1,773	45.89	▼1.90
BN	Akram Ismail	1,070	27.69	▼15.09
Love Sabah Party	Kamri Kail	523	13.54	▲13.54
Independent	Amir Kahar	261	6.75	▲6.75
Independent	Miasin Nusiri	178	4.61	▲4.61
USNO (Baru)	Salbin Muksin	48	1.24	▲1.24
Sabah People's Unity Party	Abdul Aziz Amir Bangsah	11	0.28	▼1.11
Total valid votes		3,864	100.00	
Total rejected ballots		106		
Unreturned ballots		?		
Turnout		3,961	66.45	▼4.73
Registered electors		5,961		
Majority		703	18.19	▲13.18
Sabah Heritage Party hold		Swing		
Source(s) "Tindak Malaysia GitHub".

Sabah state election, 2018
Party	Candidate	Votes	%	∆%
Sabah Heritage Party	Mohammad Mohamarin	3,613	47.79	▲47.79
BN	Abdul Mijul Unaini	3,234	42.78	▼18.54
STAR	Norlaji Amir Hassan	367	4.85	▼1.95
Sabah People's Hope Party	Abidula Amsana	198	2.62	▲2.62
Sabah People's Unity Party	Kusugan Ali	105	1.39	▲1.39
Sabah Nationality Party	Abdul Nasir Jamaluddin	43	0.57	▲0.57
Total valid votes		7,560	100.00	
Total rejected ballots		279		
Unreturned ballots		29		
Turnout		7,868	71.18	▼2.41
Registered electors		11,054		
Majority		379	5.01	▼41.25
Sabah Heritage Party gain from BN		Swing		?
Source(s) "RESULTS OF CONTESTED ELECTION AND STATEMENTS OF THE POLL AFTER THE OFFICIAL ADDITION OF VOTES".

Sabah state election, 2013
Party	Candidate	Votes	%	∆%
BN	Abdul Mijul Unaini	4,293	61.32	▼7.50
PKR	Abdul Razak Abdul Salam	1,054	15.05	▼12.20
Independent	Mursalim Tanjul	642	9.17	▲9.17
SAPP	Jae-ly Medong	536	7.66	▲5.87
STAR	Mohd Arifin Abdul Salam	476	6.80	▲6.80
Total valid votes		7,001	100.00	
Total rejected ballots		256		
Unreturned ballots		0		
Turnout		7,257	73.59	▲11.19
Registered electors		9,861		
Majority		3,239	46.26	▲4.69
BN hold		Swing		
Source(s) "KEPUTUSAN PILIHAN RAYA UMUM DEWAN UNDANGAN NEGERI". Archived from the original on 2022-10-10."Tindak Malaysia GitHub".

Sabah state election, 2008
Party	Candidate	Votes	%	∆%
BN	Abdul Mijul Unaini	3,351	68.82	▲16.79
PKR	Mursalim Tanjul	1,327	27.25	▲22.71
BERSEKUTU	Martin Lantop	87	1.79	▲1.79
Independent	Kusugan Ali	70	1.44	▲1.44
Independent	Usmar Uyuh	34	0.70	▲0.70
Total valid votes		4,869	100.00	
Total rejected ballots		232		
Unreturned ballots		8		
Turnout		5,109	62.40	▲1.33
Registered electors		8,187		
Majority		2,024	41.57	▲32.97
BN hold		Swing		
Source(s) "KEPUTUSAN PILIHAN RAYA UMUM DEWAN UNDANGAN NEGERI PERAK BAGI TAHUN 2008"."Tindak Malaysia GitHub".

Sabah state election, 2004
Party	Candidate	Votes	%	∆%
BN	Amir Kahar	2,372	52.03	▼3.00
Independent	Mursalim Tanjul	1,980	43.43	▲43.43
PKR	Muslimin Arip	207	4.54	▲4.54
Total valid votes		4,559	100.00	
Total rejected ballots		205		
Unreturned ballots		9		
Turnout		4,773	61.07	▼10.92
Registered electors		7,815		
Majority		392	8.60	▼10.95
BN hold		Swing		
Source(s) "KEPUTUSAN PILIHAN RAYA UMUM DEWAN UNDANGAN NEGERI PERAK BAGI TAHUN 2004". "Tindak Malaysia GitHub".

Sabah state election, 1999
Party	Candidate	Votes	%	∆%
BN	Amir Kahar	2,854	55.03	▲55.03
PBS	Salbin Muksin	1,840	35.48	▼15.79
BERSEKUTU	Ghazali Harris	454	8.75	▲6.71
Independent	Maria Tam	38	0.73	▲0.73
Total valid votes		5,186	100.00	
Total rejected ballots		93		
Unreturned ballots		228		
Turnout		5,507	71.99	▲1.49
Registered electors		7,650		
Majority		1,014	19.55	▲11.93
BN gain from PBS		Swing		?
Source(s) "KEPUTUSAN PILIHAN RAYA UMUM DEWAN UNDANGAN NEGERI PERAK BAGI TAHUN 1999". "Tindak Malaysia GitHub".

Sabah state election, 1994
Party	Candidate	Votes	%	∆%
PBS	Amir Kahar	2,335	51.27	▲23.91
USNO	Abdul Mijul Unaini	1,988	43.65	▼14.00
Independent	Abidula Amsana	94	2.06	▲2.06
BERSEKUTU	Napson Tahir	93	2.04	▼4.30
SETIA	Saraban Laheman	44	0.97	▲0.97
Total valid votes		4,554	100.00	
Total rejected ballots		67		
Unreturned ballots		0		
Turnout		4,621	70.50	▲3.92
Registered electors		6,555		
Majority		347	7.62	▼22.67
PBS gain from USNO		Swing		?
Source(s) "KEPUTUSAN PILIHAN RAYA UMUM DEWAN UNDANGAN NEGERI PERAK BAGI TAHUN 1994". "Tindak Malaysia GitHub".

Sabah state election, 1990
Party	Candidate	Votes	%	∆%
USNO	Amir Kahar	2,284	57.65	▼1.46
PBS	Abidula Amsana	1,084	27.36	▼6.53
BERJAYA	Saludin Ali Besar	251	6.34	▼0.67
AKAR	Eyon Angis	175	4.42	▲4.42
PRS	Motimbun Stujongkok	168	4.24	▲4.24
Total valid votes		3,962	100.00	
Total rejected ballots		102		
Unreturned ballots		0		
Turnout		4,064	66.58	▲4.39
Registered electors		6,104		
Majority		1,200	30.29	▲5.07
USNO hold		Swing		
Source(s) "KEPUTUSAN PILIHAN RAYA UMUM DEWAN UNDANGAN NEGERI PERAK BAGI TAHUN 1990". "Tindak Malaysia GitHub".

*For the 1990 elections, both PBS and USNO are part of Barisan Nasional Coalition but USNO is the state-level opposition

Sabah state election, 1986
Party	Candidate	Votes	%	∆%
USNO	Amir Kahar	2,177	59.11	▲2.66
PBS	Mohd Rosley Asantie @ Gohong Masonti	1,248	33.89	▲14.58
BERJAYA	Jose Modsinupu	258	7.01	▼13.97
Total valid votes		3,683	100.00	
Total rejected ballots		80		
Unreturned ballots		0		
Turnout		3,763	62.19	▼6.74
Registered electors		6,051		
Majority		929	25.22	▼10.26
USNO hold		Swing		
Source(s) "KEPUTUSAN PILIHAN RAYA UMUM DEWAN UNDANGAN NEGERI PERAK BAGI TAHUN 1986". "Tindak Malaysia GitHub".

Sabah state election, 1985
Party	Candidate	Votes	%	∆%
USNO	Amir Kahar	2,161	56.45	
BERJAYA	Yahaya Othman	803	20.98	
PBS	Engkuan Eyong	739	19.31	
BERSEPADU	Abidulah Amsana	98	2.56	
Independent	Ebrahim Taulani	27	0.71	
Total valid votes		3,828	100.00	
Total rejected ballots		129		
Unreturned ballots		0	0.00	
Turnout		3,957	68.93	
Registered electors		5,741		
Majority		1,358	35.48	
USNO gain from BERJAYA		Swing		?
Source(s) "How they fared". New Straits Times. 1985-04-22.

Sabah state by-election, 28 January 1983 Upon the bankruptcy of incumbent, Abdul Salam Harun
Party	Candidate	Votes	%	∆%
On the nomination day, Yahaya Othman won uncontested.
BERJAYA	Yahaya Othman			
Total valid votes				
Total rejected ballots				
Unreturned ballots				
Turnout				
Registered electors				
Majority				
BERJAYA gain from USNO		Swing		?
Source(s) "Berjaya unopposed". The Straits Times. 1983-01-31.

For the 1983 by-elections, Berjaya won the seat after two potential contestants (SEDAR and an independent) were disqualified during nomination day

Sabah state election, 1981
Party	Candidate	Votes	%	∆%
USNO	Abdul Salam Harun	1,736	50.57	▼22.56
BERJAYA	Motimbun Stujongkok	1,261	36.73	▲9.86
PAS	Malindau Sinong	379	11.04	▲11.04
PUSAKA	Saludin Ali Besar	43	1.25	▲1.25
Independent	Tamanong Suaib	14	0.41	▲0.41
Total valid votes		3,433	100.00	
Total rejected ballots		120		
Unreturned ballots		0	0.00	
Turnout		3,553	72.73	▼10.32
Registered electors		4,885		
Majority		475	13.84	▼32.43
USNO hold		Swing		
Source(s) "Sabah election: How they fared". New Straits Times. 1981-03-29.

Sabah state election, 1976
Party	Candidate	Votes	%
USNO	Mustapha Harun	2,556	73.13
BERJAYA	Abdul Hamid Ahmad	939	26.87
Total valid votes		3,495	100.00
Total rejected ballots		48	
Unreturned ballots		0	0.00
Turnout		3,543	83.05
Registered electors		4,266	
Majority		1,617	46.27
This was a new constituency created
Source(s) "Tindak Malaysia's Github".
