= Sabah Football Club Sdn Bhd =

Sabah sports and entertainment company

- Company type: Private company
- Industry: Professional sports, football association, entertainment and real-estate development
- Founded: 2021; 5 years ago
- Founder: Member of Sabah Football Association (SAFA); Verdon Bahanda (Founding member and 1st CEO); Khairul Firdaus Akbar Khan (1st co-owner)
- Headquarters: Kota Kinabalu, Malaysia
- Area served: Sabah
- Key people: Verdon Bahanda (first CEO and first owner); Marzuki Nasir; Ong Kim Swee; Jelius Ating; Khairul Firdaus Akbar Khan; Scott Ollerenshaw; Alto Linus
- Products: Kit; Football jersey Football matches tickets Football sport shoes Players fans cards
- Parent: Sabah Football Association (SAFA) (formerly, from 1993 until 2021)
- Subsidiaries: Sports teams Sabah F.C. Sabah Football Club Company; Real estate Likas Stadium; Sabah Football Club Sdn Bhd office Sabah FC Training Centre; Sabah Sport Kit Company; Sabah Ball Arena; Media; Sabah Football Club Official - @SabahFCofficial (Youtube Channel); My Sabah Fans (organised by My Football Apps - Play Store); Sabah Football Club Facebook Page; Sabah Football Club Official Media; Video games Konami's eFootball (paid collaboration since 2025)
- Website: sabah-fc.com

Sabah Football Club Sdn Bhd (Sabah FC Sdn Bhd) is a Sabahan limited liability sports and club holding company based in Sabah, Malaysia with a Company Registration Number 1383683U. (Sdn Bhd stands for Sendirian Berhad or private company in English). Formerly known as the part of North Borneo Football Association and then part of the Sabah Football Association (SAFA), the Sabah Football Club Sendirian Berhad (Sdn Bhd) became a fully independent licensed private company in 2021 by Verdon Bahanda. Today, the company has control over a football club that has two teams namely Sabah F.C. and Sabah Youth FC (U18/U23), a stadium and also websites. In 2022, this company once collaborated with Verdon Bahanda's corporation and Kinabalu Jaguar FC. Additionally, since January 1st, 2025, this company also officially collaborated with Konami's eFootball portable video games.

== Former company and association managers ==
=== Association Managers (until 2022) ===
- (Malaysia) Goh Thian Chuan (1999, 2015)
- (Malaysia) Osman Jamal (2000–2001)
- (Malaysia) Mohd Joehari Mohd Ayub (2004–2005)
- (Malaysia) Abdul Rahman Zakaria (2006–2009, 2014)
- (Malaysia) Mohd Asyraaf Fong Abdullah (2009)
- (Australia) Gary Phillips (2010–2011)
- (Malaysia) Shahriman Abdullah (2011–2012)
- (Malaysia) Alijus Sipil (2013–2014)
- (Algeria) Adlane Messelem (2017)
- (Malaysia) Juil Nuatim (2018)
- (Malaysia) Peter Anthony (2018–2020)
- (Malaysia) Jelius Ating (2020–2022)

=== Company's Club Managers (established in 2021) ===
- (Malaysia) Ong Kim Swee
- (Malaysia) Rafie Robert
- (Spain) Juan Torres Garrido

== See also ==
- Sabah Football Association (SAFA) - State Football Association
- Sabah F.C. (Malaysia) - Malaysian professional football club
- Verdon Bahanda - Company founding member (Politician and Entrepreneur)
