= Juan Flere =

Argentine footballer (born 1998)

Personal information
- Full name: Juan Flere Pizzuti
- Date of birth: 12 May 1998 (age 28)
- Place of birth: Bariloche, Argentina
- Height: 1.82 m (6 ft 0 in)
- Position: Goalkeeper

Team information
- Current team: Sabah FC
- Number: 22

Youth career
- Damm

Senior career*
Years	Team	Apps	(Gls)
2017–2018	Llagostera B	18	(0)
2018–2019	Xerez Deportivo	32	(0)
2019–2022	Cádiz B	43	(0)
2020–2023	Cádiz	1	(0)
2022–2023	→ Algeciras (loan)	8	(0)
2023–2024	Sanluqueño	5	(0)
2024–2026	Europa	67	(0)
2026-	Sabah FC	4	(0)
- * Club domestic league appearances and goals

Juan Flere Pizzuti (born 12 May 1998) is an Argentine professional footballer who plays as a goalkeeper for Malaysia Super League club Sabah FC.

== Club career ==
Born in Bariloche, Flere moved to Catalonia at early age and finished his formation with Damm. On 14 June 2017, he signed for Llagostera, being initially assigned to the reserves in the regional leagues.

Flere made his senior debut on 3 September 2017, starting in a 2–1 home win against Banyoles. In October 2018, he left the club and joined Tercera División side Xerez Deportivo on a one-year deal. At the latter club, he was a regular starter, and set a club record of 1,003 minutes without conceding.

On 2 July 2019, Flere moved to Cádiz, being initially assigned to the B-team in Segunda División B. He made his first-team debut on 20 July of the following year, starting in a 0–1 home loss against Albacete in the Segunda División.

On 9 December 2021, Flere renewed his contract until 2025. The following 7 July, he was loaned to Primera Federación side Algeciras for the season.

On 3 August 2023, Flere signed a one-year contract with Sanluqueño also in the third division.

On 1 July 2024, Flere moved to Europa in the fourth tier.
