= Likas Stadium =

Stadium in Kota Kinabalu, Malaysia

Coordinates: 5°59′00″N 116°05′44″E

Likas Stadium Stadium Likas
- Rumah Sang Badak
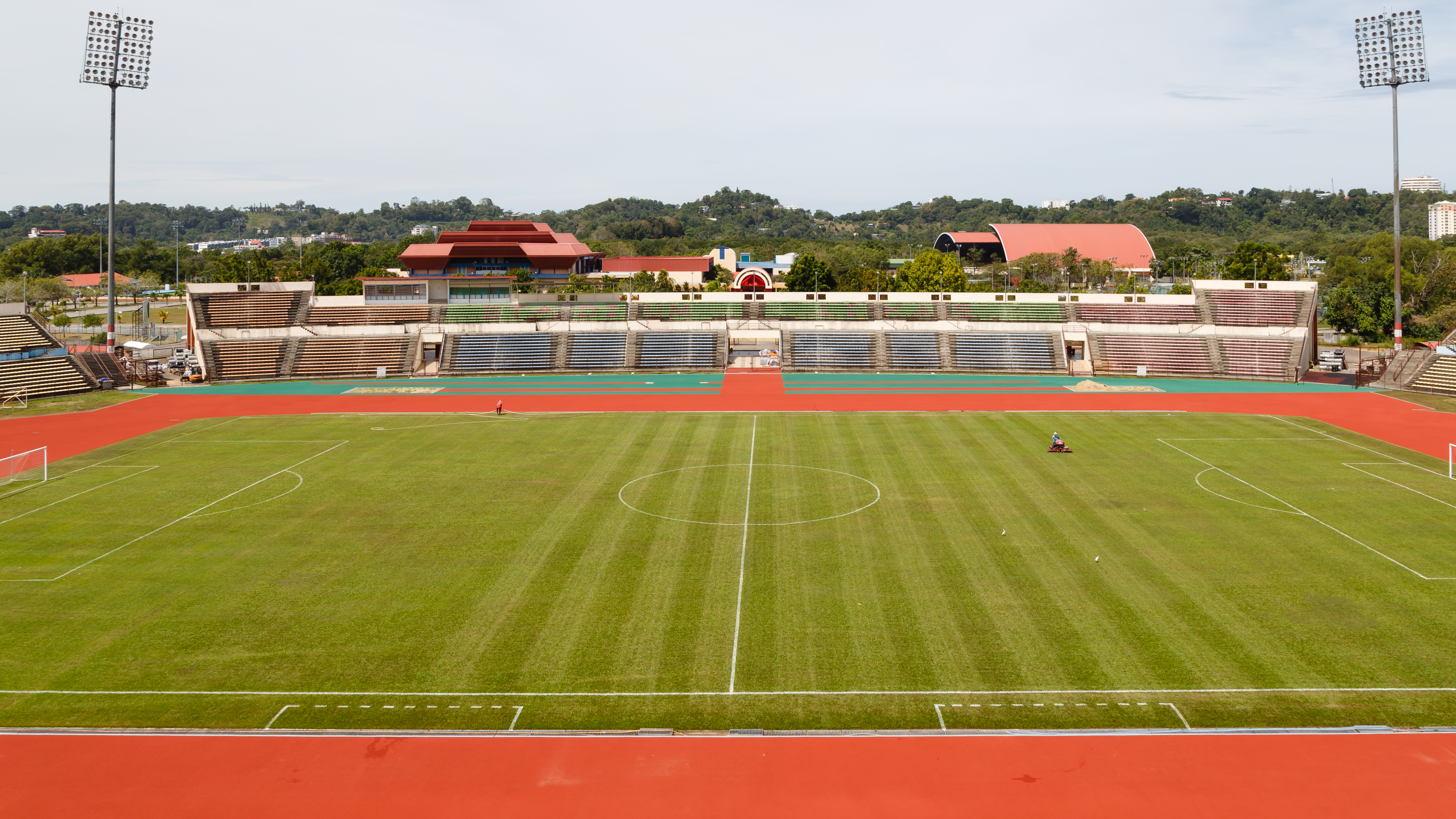
- Interactive map of Likas Stadium; Stadium Likas
- Location: Kota Kinabalu, Sabah, Malaysia
- Owner: Sabah Ministry of Youth Development, Sports Advancement and Creative Economy (MYSpaCE / KBSK)
- Operator: Assistant Ministry of Youth and Sports Sabah (KBS)
- Capacity: 20,787
- Surface: Grass pitch, track and field
- Scoreboard: Olympex Seven-segment display (2001–2023); Video Scoreboard (2023–)
- Field size: 105 m × 68 m (115 yd × 74 yd)

Construction
- Opened: 1983; 43 years ago
- Renovated: 2001, 2023 (preparation for Asian Football Confederation)
- Cost: undisclosed

Tenants
- Sabah FC (1983–present); Sabah FA (Women); KDMM FC; Kinabalu Jaguar FC; Sabah FC Sdn Bhd Company general meeting

Likas Stadium (Malay: Stadium Likas; nicknamed Rumah Sang Badak) is a multi-purpose stadium in Likas, Kota Kinabalu, Sabah, Malaysia. It is mainly used for football and athletics, located within the Likas Sports Complex. It has been the home stadium of Sabah FC since its opening in 1983, become the main reason on why the stadium nicknamed "Rumah Sang Badak" in Malay or "The Home of Rhinos" in English. It was renovated in 2001, and in 2023 for the AFC usage. It is also used as the home stadium of the Sabah FA Women's Team as they host clubs for the Malaysia National Women's League and the AFC Women's Champions League 2024. Likas Stadium has a capacity of 20,787, making it the 8th largest football stadium in Malaysia in terms of seating capacity.

== See also ==
- Sport in Malaysia
