= Park Jung-bin =

South Korean footballer (born 1994)

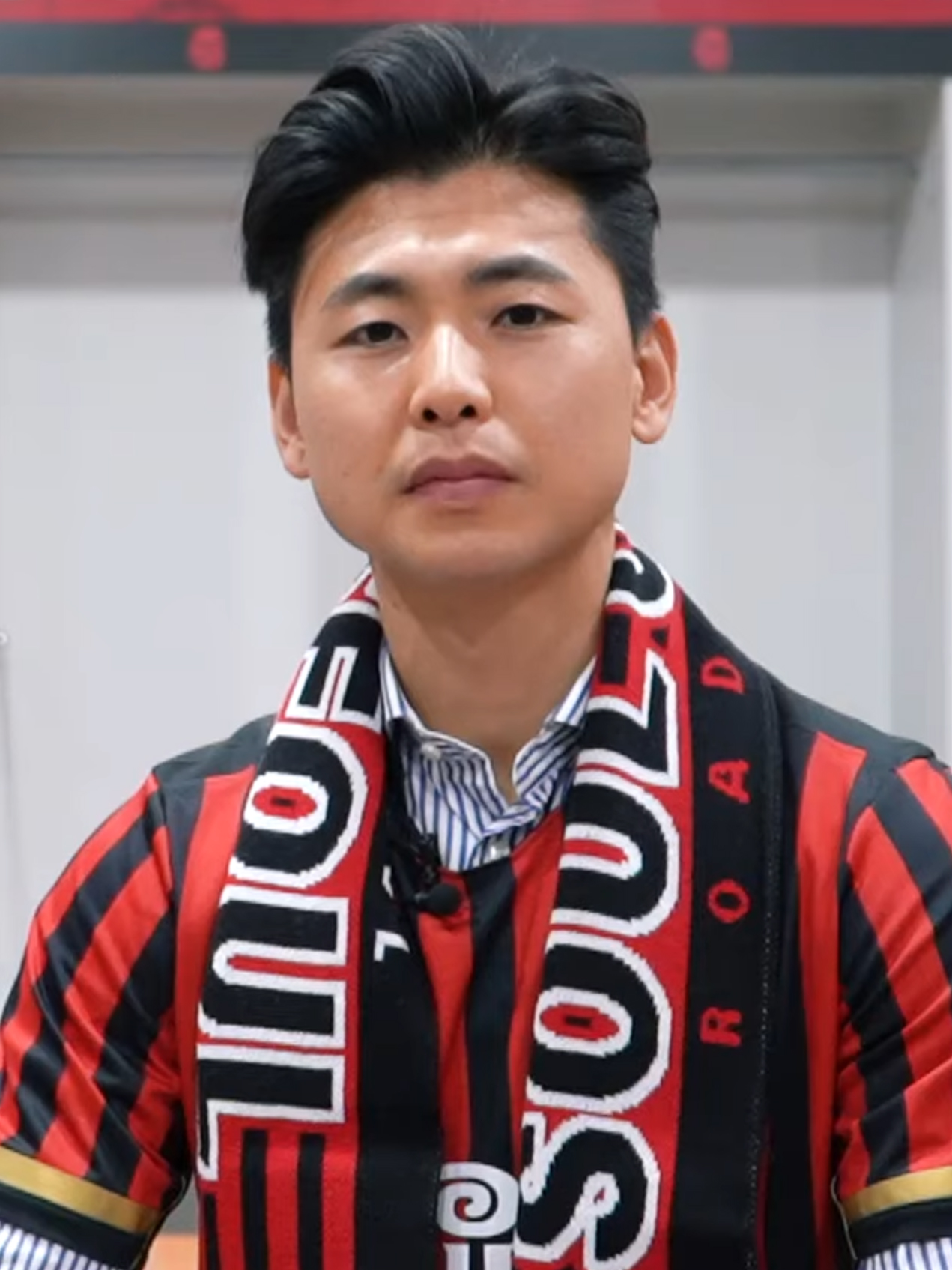
- Park with FC Seoul in December 2020

Personal information
- Date of birth: 22 February 1994 (age 32)
- Place of birth: Busan, South Korea
- Height: 1.77 m (5 ft 10 in)
- Positions: Attacking midfielder; forward

Team information
- Current team: Sabah FC
- Number: 9

Youth career
- Chunnam Dragons U18
- 2010–2012: VfL Wolfsburg

Senior career*
Years	Team	Apps	(Gls)
2012–2013	VfL Wolfsburg II	8	(1)
2013	→ Greuther Fürth (loan)	9	(0)
2013–2015	Karlsruher SC	16	(0)
2015–2016	Hobro IK	22	(2)
2016–2019	Viborg FF	50	(5)
2019–2020	Servette	6	(4)
2021–2022	FC Seoul	15	(1)
2022–2024	Rodez AF	7	(0)
2024–2026	Visakha	51	(18)
2026–	Sabah	4	(1)

International career
2007	South Korea U17	7	(3)
2016	South Korea U23	3	(0)
- * Club domestic league appearances and goals as of 12:50, 21 October 2026 (UTC)

Park Jung-bin (Korean: 박정빈; born 22 February 1994) is a South Korean professional footballer who plays as an attacking midfielder or forward for Malaysia Super League club Sabah.

== Club career ==
In 2011, Park made his debut in the Regionalliga Nord with the VfL Wolfsburg II. In the winter transfer period of the 2012–13 season, he was loaned out to Greuther Fürth until mid of June 2014. He made his Bundesliga debut in a match against Bayern Munich.

On 1 September 2013, Karlsruher SC announced his transfer from Wolfsburg on a three-year contract.

After three seasons at Viborg FF, he left the club at the end of the 2018–19 season.

In July 2019, he was on trial at Troyes AC and played a friendly match against Villefranche.

Since October 2019, he plays for Servette FC of the Swiss Super League. He announced his departure from the club in June 2020. He wasn't able to agree to a new contract with the Swiss club, Servette FC.

On 30 December 2020, he has gone back to FC Seoul of the South Korean K League 1. In 2021 he played 10 games and had a total of 378 minutes of time played on the field. On 12 May 2022, he left the club as his contract was terminated through mutual consent.

On 15 August 2022, he joined Rodez of Ligue 2.
