= Mohammad Mohamarin =

Malaysian politician

Yang Berhormat Datuk Mohammad Mohamarin PGDK ASDK MLA
- محمّد محمرين

State Assistant Minister of Education and Innovation of Sabah
- In office 16 May 2018 – 29 September 2020 Serving with Jennifer Lasimbang
- Governor: Juhar Mahiruddin
- Chief Minister: Shafie Apdal
- Minister: Yusof Yacob
- Preceded by: Position established
- Succeeded by: Ruddy Awah (State Assistant Minister of Science and Innovation of Sabah)
- Constituency: Banggi

Member of the Sabah State Legislative Assembly for Banggi
- Incumbent
- Assumed office 9 May 2018
- Preceded by: Abd Mijul Unaini (BN–UMNO)
- Majority: 379 (2018); 703 (2020); 1,306 (2025)

Faction represented in the Sabah State Legislative Assembly
- 2018–2023: Heritage Party
- January 2023– February 2023: Independent
- March 2023–: Gabungan Rakyat Sabah

Personal details
- Born: Mohammad bin Mohamarin; 10 December 1980 (age 45) Kudat, Crown Colony of North Borneo (now Sabah, Malaysia)
- Citizenship: Malaysian
- Party: United Malays National Organisation of Sabah (Sabah UMNO) (until 2018); Heritage Party (WARISAN) (2018–2023); Independent (2023); Parti Gagasan Rakyat Sabah (GAGASAN) (since 2023)
- Other political affiliations: Barisan Nasional (BN) (until 2018); Gabungan Rakyat Sabah (GRS) (since 2023)
- Spouse: Haminah Talip
- Occupation: Politician

Mohammad bin Mohamarin (born 10 December 1980) is a Malaysian politician who has served as the Member of the Sabah State Legislative Assembly (MLA) for Banggi since May 2018. He served as the State Assistant Minister of Education and Innovation of Sabah in the Heritage Party (WARISAN) state administration under former Chief Minister Shafie Apdal and former State Minister Yusof Yacob from May 2018 to the collapse of WARISAN state administration in September 2020. He is a member of the Parti Gagasan Rakyat Sabah (GAGASAN), a component party of the Gabungan Rakyat Sabah (GRS) coalition. He was member of WARISAN and United Malays National Organisation of Sabah (Sabah UMNO), a branch of a component party of the Barisan Nasional (BN) coalition. He is currently the Divisional Chairman of N01 Banggi Branch of GAGASAN.

== Election results ==
Sabah State Legislative Assembly
Year	Constituency	Candidate	Votes	Pct	Opponent(s)	Votes	Pct	Ballots cast	Majority	Turnout
2018	N01 Banggi	Mohammad Mohamarin (WARISAN)	3,613	47.79%	Abd Mijul Unaini (UMNO)	3,234	42.78%	7,868	379	71.20%
2018	N01 Banggi	Mohammad Mohamarin (WARISAN)	3,613	47.79%	Norlaji Amir Hassan (STAR)	367	4.85%	7,868	379	71.20%
2018	N01 Banggi	Mohammad Mohamarin (WARISAN)	3,613	47.79%	Abidula Amsana (PHRS)	198	2.62%	7,868	379	71.20%
2018	N01 Banggi	Mohammad Mohamarin (WARISAN)	3,613	47.79%	Kusugan Ali (PPRS)	105	1.39%	7,868	379	71.20%
2018	N01 Banggi	Mohammad Mohamarin (WARISAN)	3,613	47.79%	Abdul Nasir Jamaluddin (PKS)	43	0.57%	7,868	379	71.20%
2020	N01 Banggi	Mohammad Mohamarin (WARISAN)	1,773	45.89%	Akram Ismail (UMNO)	1,070	27.69%	3,864	703	64.82%
2020	N01 Banggi	Mohammad Mohamarin (WARISAN)	1,773	45.89%	Kamri Kail (PCS)	523	13.54%	3,864	703	64.82%
2020	N01 Banggi	Mohammad Mohamarin (WARISAN)	1,773	45.89%	Amir Kahar Mustapha (IND)	261	6.75%	3,864	703	64.82%
2020	N01 Banggi	Mohammad Mohamarin (WARISAN)	1,773	45.89%	Miasin Nusiri (IND)	178	4.61%	3,864	703	64.82%
2020	N01 Banggi	Mohammad Mohamarin (WARISAN)	1,773	45.89%	Salbin Muksin (USNO Baru)	48	1.24%	3,864	703	64.82%
2020	N01 Banggi	Mohammad Mohamarin (WARISAN)	1,773	45.89%	Abdul Aziz Amir Bangsah (PPRS)	11	0.28%	3,864	703	64.82%
2025	N01 Banggi	Mohammad Mohamarin (GAGASAN)	2,484	44.81%	Zainal Romio (WARISAN)	1,178	21.25%	5,544	1,306	58.46%
2025	N01 Banggi	Mohammad Mohamarin (GAGASAN)	2,484	44.81%	Nasib Samodi (IND)	561	10.12%	5,544	1,306	58.46%
2025	N01 Banggi	Mohammad Mohamarin (GAGASAN)	2,484	44.81%	Normalah Rasik (UMNO)	470	8.48%	5,544	1,306	58.46%
2025	N01 Banggi	Mohammad Mohamarin (GAGASAN)	2,484	44.81%	Among Timbul (IMPIAN)	371	6.69%	5,544	1,306	58.46%
2025	N01 Banggi	Mohammad Mohamarin (GAGASAN)	2,484	44.81%	Rahimah Majid (BERSATU)	296	5.34%	5,544	1,306	58.46%
2025	N01 Banggi	Mohammad Mohamarin (GAGASAN)	2,484	44.81%	Salbin Muksin (STAR)	70	1.26%	5,544	1,306	58.46%
2025	N01 Banggi	Mohammad Mohamarin (GAGASAN)	2,484	44.81%	Hussin Masudin (IND)	29	0.52%	5,544	1,306	58.46%
2025	N01 Banggi	Mohammad Mohamarin (GAGASAN)	2,484	44.81%	Datu Razak Datu Salam (ANAK NEGERI)	28	0.51%	5,544	1,306	58.46%
2025	N01 Banggi	Mohammad Mohamarin (GAGASAN)	2,484	44.81%	Raymon Majumah (PKS)	26	0.47%	5,544	1,306	58.46%
2025	N01 Banggi	Mohammad Mohamarin (GAGASAN)	2,484	44.81%	Sakinolin Mohamad (IND)	25	0.45%	5,544	1,306	58.46%
2025	N01 Banggi	Mohammad Mohamarin (GAGASAN)	2,484	44.81%	Halman Maniuk (PBK)	6	0.11%	5,544	1,306	58.46%

== Honours ==
- Sabah
  - Commander of the Order of Kinabalu (PGDK) – Datuk (2024)
  - Companion of the Order of Kinabalu (ASDK) (2018)
