= Amir Kahar =

Malaysian politician

Amir Kahar Mustapha was the State Assemblymen for Banggi, Sabah for 22 years. He is the son of Tun Datu Haji Mustapha Datu Haji Harun, the “Father of Sabah Independence” who was the former Chief Minister of Sabah and the former Governor of Sabah.

He was the former Deputy Chief Minister of Sabah and a Minister of Agriculture from 1993 to 1994. Datuk Amir was the Member of Parliament of Kota Marudu and Kudat from 1990 to 2004. Presently he is the Inspector General of Project Sabah with ministerial status at the Chief Minister Office Sabah. He was formerly the president United Sabah National Organization from 1992 to 1994. Currently Datuk Amir Kahar is the founder and president of Sabah And Palawan Cooperation Chamber Of Commerce And Industry.

He holds Diploma of Business Studies from London School of Business and a holder of Harvard School of Business Advance Certificate in Entrepreneurship.

He is married to Aminah Ambrose (born Mary E Ambrose Dumpangol) and has 4 sons and 1 daughter. Aminah is also active in politics, and have contested in the 2020 Sabah elections as an independent candidate. His son Azlan Amir, 24, were murdered in 2007; while another son, Anwar, were found guilty of stealing Aminah's watches in 2022 and were sentenced to 1 year jail and RM3,000 fine.

== Election results ==
Parliament of Malaysia
Year	Constituency	Candidate	Votes	Pct	Opponent(s)	Votes	Pct	Ballots cast	Majority	Turnout
1986	P134 Merudu	Amir Kahar Mustapha (USNO)	4,690	43.20%	Joe Ojihi Supiring (IND)	5,263	48.48%	11,013	573	46.78%
1986	P134 Merudu	Amir Kahar Mustapha (USNO)	4,690	43.20%	Mohamad Ayong (IND)	904	8.33%	11,013	573	46.78%
1990	P134 Merudu	Amir Kahar Mustapha (USNO)	8,064	49.84%	Joe Ojihi Supiring (IND)	7,790	48.14%	16,327	274	58.69%
1990	P134 Merudu	Amir Kahar Mustapha (USNO)	8,064	49.84%	Chong Jan Fah (DAP)	327	2.02%	16,327	274	58.69%
1995	P146 Merudu	Amir Kahar Mustapha (PBS)	10,880	50.26%	Mohammad Yahya Lampong (UMNO)	10,766	49.74%	21,959	114	68.05%
1999	P146 Merudu	Amir Kahar Mustapha (UMNO)	11,850	59.19%	Md Zakaria Said (PBS)	7,963	39.78%	20,284	3,887	57.12%
1999	P146 Merudu	Amir Kahar Mustapha (UMNO)	11,850	59.19%	Amatus Bernadus Anjun (STAR)	206	1.03%	20,284	3,887	57.12%

Sabah State Legislative Assembly
Year	Constituency	Candidate	Votes	Pct	Opponent(s)	Votes	Pct	Ballots cast	Majority	Turnout
1986	N01 Banggi	Amir Kahar Mustapha (USNO)	2,177	59.11%	Mohd Rosley Asantie (PBS)	1,248	33.88%	3,763	929	62.19%
1986	N01 Banggi	Amir Kahar Mustapha (USNO)	2,177	59.11%	Jose Modsinupu (BERJAYA)	258	7.01%	3,763	929	62.19%
1990	N01 Banggi	Amir Kahar Mustapha (USNO)	2,284	57.65%	Abidula Amsana (PBS)	1,084	27.35%	4,064	1,200	66.58%
1990	N01 Banggi	Amir Kahar Mustapha (USNO)	2,284	57.65%	Saludin Ali Besar (BERJAYA)	251	6.34%	4,064	1,200	66.58%
1990	N01 Banggi	Amir Kahar Mustapha (USNO)	2,284	57.65%	Eyon Angis (AKAR)	175	4.42%	4,064	1,200	66.58%
1990	N01 Banggi	Amir Kahar Mustapha (USNO)	2,284	57.65%	Motimbun Stujongkok (PRS)	168	4.24%	4,064	1,200	66.58%
1994	N01 Banggi	Amir Kahar Mustapha (PBS)	2,335	51.24%	Abd. Mijul Unaini (UMNO)	1,988	43.69%	4,621	347	70.50%
1994	N01 Banggi	Amir Kahar Mustapha (PBS)	2,335	51.24%	Abidula Amsana (IND)	94	2.06%	4,621	347	70.50%
1994	N01 Banggi	Amir Kahar Mustapha (PBS)	2,335	51.24%	Napson Tahir (BERSEKUTU)	93	2.04%	4,621	347	70.50%
1994	N01 Banggi	Amir Kahar Mustapha (PBS)	2,335	51.24%	Saraban Laheman (SETIA)	44	0.97%	4,621	347	70.50%
1999	N01 Banggi	Amir Kahar Mustapha (UMNO)	2,854	55.03%	Salbin Muksin (PBS)	1,840	35.33%	5,279	1,014	69.01%
1999	N01 Banggi	Amir Kahar Mustapha (UMNO)	2,854	55.03%	Ghazai Harrid (BERSEKUTU)	454	8.75%	5,279	1,014	69.01%
1999	N01 Banggi	Amir Kahar Mustapha (UMNO)	2,854	55.03%	Maria Tam (IND)	38	0.89%	5,279	1,014	69.01%
2004	N01 Banggi	Amir Kahar Mustapha (UMNO)	2,372	52.03%	Mursalim Tanjul (IND)	1,980	43.43%	4,764	392	61.07%
2004	N01 Banggi	Amir Kahar Mustapha (UMNO)	2,372	52.03%	Muslimin Arip (keADILan)	207	4.54%	4,764	392	61.07%
2020	N01 Banggi	Amir Kahar Mustapha (IND)	261	6.75%	Mohammad Mohamarin (WARISAN)	1,773	45.89%	3,864	703	64.82%
2020	N01 Banggi	Amir Kahar Mustapha (IND)	261	6.75%	Akram Ismail (UMNO)	1,070	27.69%	3,864	703	64.82%
2020	N01 Banggi	Amir Kahar Mustapha (IND)	261	6.75%	Kamri Kail (PCS)	523	13.54%	3,864	703	64.82%
2020	N01 Banggi	Amir Kahar Mustapha (IND)	261	6.75%	Miasin Nusiri (IND)	178	4.61%	3,864	703	64.82%
2020	N01 Banggi	Amir Kahar Mustapha (IND)	261	6.75%	Salbin Muksin (USNO Baru)	48	1.24%	3,864	703	64.82%
2020	N01 Banggi	Amir Kahar Mustapha (IND)	261	6.75%	Abdul Aziz Amir Bangsah (PPRS)	11	0.28%	3,864	703	64.82%
