= Verdon Bahanda =

Malaysian politician, businessman and indigenous activist

Yang Berhormat Dato' Verdon Bahanda DIMP MP
- ۏردون باهندا

Member of the Malaysian Parliament for Kudat
- Incumbent
- Assumed office 19 November 2022
- Preceded by: Abdul Rahim Bakri (BN–UMNO)
- Majority: 1,967 (2022)

Chief Executive Officer and Director of the Sabah Football Club Sdn Bhd
- In office 12 November 2020 – 21 December 2020

Faction represented in Dewan Rakyat
- 2022–: Independent

Personal details
- Born: Verdon bin Bahanda Sabah, Malaysia
- Citizenship: Malaysia
- Party: Independent
- Relations: Wetrom Bahanda (elder brother); Redonah Bahanda (sister)
- Occupation: Politician
- Profession: Businessman
- Verdon Bahanda on Facebook

Verdon bin Bahanda is a Malaysian politician, businessman and indigenous activist who has served as the Member of Parliament (MP) for Kudat since November 2022. He is an independent. He served as the Chief Executive Officer (CEO) and Director of Sabah Football Club Sdn Bhd from November 2020 to his resignation in December 2020. He was also the owner of the Sabah Football Club Sdn Bhd after its unofficial and official privatisation in November 2020 and 2021 respectively. He was the only independent MP at the time of his election as an MP and prior to the removal of six MPs from Perikatan Nasional (PN), one of the two independent candidates who was elected in the 2022 general election along with Tenom MP Riduan Rubin who is a member of the Social Democratic Harmony Party (KDM) and Verdon is the first independent Kudat MP in Malaysian history. He is also the younger brother of Wetrom Bahanda, the Kota Marudu MP.

== Political career ==
=== Member of Parliament (since 2022) ===
==== 2022 general election ====
In the 2022 general election, Verdon made his electoral debut after nominating himself to contest for the Kudat federal seat as an independent candidate. He won the seat and was elected into Parliament as the Kudat MP after defeating Ruddy Awah of Gabungan Rakyat Sabah (GRS), Rashid Abdul Harun of the Heritage Party (WARISAN), Thonny Chee of Pakatan Harapan (PH) and Nur Alya Humaira Usun of Gerakan Tanah Air (GTA) by a majority of 1,967 votes.

== Election results ==
Parliament of Malaysia
Year	Constituency	Candidate	Votes	Pct	Opponent(s)	Votes	Pct	Ballots cast	Majority	Turnout
2022	P167 Kudat	Verdon Bahanda (IND)	16,323	36.19%	Ruddy Awah (Sabah BERSATU)	14,356	31.83%	45,108	1,967	59.57%
2022	P167 Kudat	Verdon Bahanda (IND)	16,323	36.19%	Rashid Abdul Harun (WARISAN)	9,421	20.89%	45,108	1,967	59.57%
2022	P167 Kudat	Verdon Bahanda (IND)	16,323	36.19%	Thonny Chee (PKR)	4,726	10.48%	45,108	1,967	59.57%
2022	P167 Kudat	Verdon Bahanda (IND)	16,323	36.19%	Nur Alya Humaira Usun (PEJUANG)	282	0.63%	45,108	1,967	59.57%

Sabah State Legislative Assembly
Year	Constituency	Candidate	Votes	Pct	Opponent(s)	Votes	Pct	Ballots cast	Majority	Turnout
2025	N04 Tanjong Kapor	Verdon Bahanda (IND)	5,492	34.77%	Ben Chong Chen Bin (GAGASAN)	6,171	30.19%	20,855	359	61.45%
2025	N04 Tanjong Kapor	Verdon Bahanda (IND)	5,492	34.77%	Terence Au Soon Fui (WARISAN)	4,737	23.17%	20,855	359	61.45%
2025	N04 Tanjong Kapor	Verdon Bahanda (IND)	5,492	34.77%	Kevin Lee Sip Kim (MCA)	1,455	7.12%	20,855	359	61.45%
2025	N04 Tanjong Kapor	Verdon Bahanda (IND)	5,492	34.77%	Muhammad Affan Jumahat (Sabah BERSATU)	1,262	6.17%	20,855	359	61.45%
2025	N04 Tanjong Kapor	Verdon Bahanda (IND)	5,492	34.77%	Shawn Davey Lee (STAR)	434	2.12%	20,855	359	61.45%
2025	N04 Tanjong Kapor	Verdon Bahanda (IND)	5,492	34.77%	Jetol Dangin (IMPIAN)	184	0.90%	20,855	359	61.45%
2025	N04 Tanjong Kapor	Verdon Bahanda (IND)	5,492	34.77%	Abdul Halim Yussof (PBK)	166	0.81%	20,855	359	61.45%
2025	N04 Tanjong Kapor	Verdon Bahanda (IND)	5,492	34.77%	Abdul Rahim Madtaip (IND)	105	0.51%	20,855	359	61.45%
2025	N04 Tanjong Kapor	Verdon Bahanda (IND)	5,492	34.77%	Awang Karim Abdul Kadir (ANAK NEGERI)	63	0.31%	20,855	359	61.45%
2025	N04 Tanjong Kapor	Verdon Bahanda (IND)	5,492	34.77%	Bonny Berman (SPP)	52	0.25%	20,855	359	61.45%

== Honours ==
=== Honours of Malaysia ===
- Malaysia
  - Recipient of the 17th Yang di-Pertuan Agong Installation Medal (2025)
- Pahang
  - Knight Companion of the Order of the Crown of Pahang (DIMP) – Dato' (2012)

== See also ==
- Kudat (federal constituency)
- Independent politician
