= Pitas (state constituency) =

State constituency in Sabah, Malaysia

Pitas (N03)
Sabah constituency

State constituency
- Legislature: Sabah State Legislative Assembly
MLA
Ruddy Awah
GRS
- Constituency created: 2003
- First contested: 2004
- Last contested: 2025

Demographics
- Electors (2025): 17,574

Pitas is a state constituency in Sabah, Malaysia, that is represented in the Sabah State Legislative Assembly.

== Demographics ==
As of 2020, Pitas has a population of 19,362 people.

Ethnic breakdown of Pitas's electorate as of 2025
1. Muslim Bumiputera (55.0%)
2. Non-Muslim Bumiputera (43.0%)
3. Other ethnicities (1.40%)
4. Chinese (0.60%)

== History ==
=== Polling districts ===
According to the gazette issued on 24 September 2019, the Pitas constituency has a total of 10 polling districts.

State constituency	Polling Districts	Code	Location
Pitas（N03）	Telaga	167/03/01	SK Telaga
Pitas（N03）	Kalumpang	167/03/02	SK Salimpodon Darat
Pitas（N03）	Salimpodon	167/03/03	SK Salimpon Darat
Pitas（N03）	Pitas	167/03/04	SMK Pitas
Pitas（N03）	Liu	167/03/05	SK Liu
Pitas（N03）	Malubang	167/03/06	SK Malubang
Pitas（N03）	Rosob	167/03/07	SK Rosob
Pitas（N03）	Pinggan-Pinggan	167/03/08	SK Pinggan-Pinggan
Pitas（N03）	Sungai Eloi	167/03/09	SK Datong
Pitas（N03）	Sanitan	167/03/10	SK Nibang

=== Representation history ===
Members of the Legislative Assembly for Pitas
Assembly	No	Years	Member	Party
Constituency renamed from Bengkoka
12th	N03	2004–2008	Masrani Parman	BN (UMNO)
13th	N03	2008–2013	Bolkiah Ismail	BN (UMNO)
14th	N03	2013–2018	Bolkiah Ismail	BN (UMNO)
15th	N03	2018	Bolkiah Ismail	BN (UMNO)
15th	N03	2018–2020	Bolkiah Ismail	WARISAN
15th	N03	2020	Bolkiah Ismail	Independent
16th	N03	2020–2021	Ruddy Awah	Independent
16th	N03	2021–2022	Ruddy Awah	GRS (BERSATU)
16th	N03	2022–2023	Ruddy Awah	GRS (Direct)
16th	N03	2023–2025	Ruddy Awah	GRS (GAGASAN)
17th	N03	2025–present	Ruddy Awah	GRS (GAGASAN)

== Election results ==
Sabah state election, 2025
Party	Candidate	Votes	%	∆%
GRS	Ruddy Awah	5,754	47.57	▲47.57
Heritage	Harun Ismail	4,189	34.63	▲13.72
BN	Bolkiah Ismail	1,331	11.00	▼20.52
Sabah Dream Party	Kinchin Boluot	425	3.51	▲3.51
KDM	Abd Hamid Kimin	266	2.20	▲2.20
Independent	Nazri Santong	131	1.08	▲1.08
Total valid votes		12,096		
Total rejected ballots		233		
Unreturned ballots		13		
Turnout		12,342	70.23	▲4.39
Registered electors		17,574		
Majority		1,565	12.94	▲5.45
GRS gain from Independent		Swing		?
Source(s) "RESULTS OF CONTESTED ELECTION AND STATEMENTS OF THE POLL AFTER THE OFFICIAL ADDITION OF VOTES" (PDF).

Sabah state election, 2020
Party	Candidate	Votes	%	∆%
Independent	Ruddy Awah	2,918	39.00	▲39.00
BN	Sufian Abdul Karim	2,359	31.52	▼11.29
Sabah Heritage Party	Shariff Azman	1,565	20.91	▼12.11
Love Sabah Party	Sh Sahar Sh Ading	314	4.20	▲4.20
USNO (Baru)	Ilasam Nurkasim	114	1.52	▲1.52
Total valid votes		7,270	97.15	
Total rejected ballots		192	2.57	
Unreturned ballots		21	0.28	
Turnout		7,483	65.84	▼9.99
Registered electors		10,928		
Majority		559	7.48	▼2.41
Independent gain from BN		Swing		?
Source(s) "RESULTS OF CONTESTED ELECTION AND STATEMENTS OF THE POLL AFTER THE OFFICIAL ADDITION OF VOTES".

Sabah state election, 2018
Party	Candidate	Votes	%	∆%
BN	Bolkiah Ismail	5,606	42.81	▼16.14
Sabah Heritage Party	Maklin Masiau	4,324	33.02	▲33.02
Sabah People's Hope Party	Bakir Mancaing	1,527	11.66	▲11.66
Sabah Nationality Party	Ramlah Nasir	508	3.88	▲3.88
Sabah Native Co-operation Party	Pransol Tiying	400	3.05	▲3.05
PAS	Dausieh Queck @ Paraman	262	2.00	▼6.30
Total valid votes		12,627	96.43	
Total rejected ballots		416	3.18	
Unreturned ballots		52	0.40	
Turnout		13,095	75.83	▼3.07
Registered electors		17,269		
Majority		1,282	9.79	▼22.71
BN hold		Swing		
Source(s) "RESULTS OF CONTESTED ELECTION AND STATEMENTS OF THE POLL AFTER THE OFFICIAL ADDITION OF VOTES".

Sabah state election, 2013
Party	Candidate	Votes	%	∆%
BN	Bolkiah Ismail	6,934	58.95	▼11.19
STAR	Maklin Masiau	3,111	26.45	▲26.45
PAS	Dausieh Queck @ Paraman	976	8.30	▲8.30
SAPP	Johnes @ Onis Piut	232	1.97	▲1.97
KITA	Awang Latip Abdul Salam	138	1.17	▲1.17
Total valid votes		11,391	96.85	
Total rejected ballots		354	3.01	
Unreturned ballots		17	0.14	
Turnout		11,762	78.90	▲10.21
Registered electors		14,912		
Majority		3,823	32.50	▼14.35
BN hold		Swing		
Source(s) "KEPUTUSAN PILIHAN RAYA UMUM DEWAN UNDANGAN NEGERI"."Tindak Malaysia GitHub".

Sabah state election, 2008
Party	Candidate	Votes	%	∆%
BN	Bolkiah Ismail	5,761	70.14	▲21.40
PKR	Paulus Itom @ Paul Tom	1,913	23.29	▲23.29
Independent	Yusoff Matarang	127	1.55	▲1.55
Independent	Jolly Majalap @ Lucundus Harry	120	1.46	▲1.46
Total valid votes		7,921	96.44	
Total rejected ballots		277	3.37	
Unreturned ballots		15	0.18	
Turnout		8,213	68.69	▲5.38
Registered electors		11,956		
Majority		3,848	46.85	▲34.94
BN hold		Swing		
Source(s) "KEPUTUSAN PILIHAN RAYA UMUM DEWAN UNDANGAN NEGERI PERAK BAGI TAHUN 2008". "Tindak Malaysia GitHub".

Sabah state election, 2004
Party	Candidate	Votes	%
BN	Masrani Parman	3,278	48.74
Independent	Othman Aliasah	2,477	36.83
Independent	Masandul Madee	474	7.05
BERSEKUTU	Abu Bakar Siman	158	1.29
PASOK	Rose @ Ulimsim Ungkir	87	1.46
Total valid votes		6,474	96.27
Total rejected ballots		251	3.73
Unreturned ballots		0	0.00
Turnout		6,725	63.31
Registered electors		10,622	
Majority		801	11.91
This was a new constituency created
Source(s) "KEPUTUSAN PILIHAN RAYA UMUM DEWAN UNDANGAN NEGERI PERAK BAGI TAHUN 2004". "Tindak Malaysia GitHub".
