= 2019 Sabah FA season =

Sabah
2019 season
- President: Peter Anthony
- Manager: Henry Saimpon
- Head coach: Jelius Ating
- Stadium: Likas Stadium
- Malaysia Premier League: 1st (promoted)
- Malaysia FA Cup: Second round
- Malaysia Cup: Group stage
- Top goalscorer: League: Rodoljub Paunović (11); All: Rodoljub Paunović (11)
Home colours	Away colours

The 2019 season was Sabah's 7th competitive season in the second tier of Malaysian football, the Malaysia Premier League after relegated in 2012. Along with the Malaysia Premier League, the club competes in the Malaysia FA Cup and the Malaysia Cup.

== Players ==
Note: Flags indicate national team as defined under FIFA eligibility rules; some limited exceptions apply. Players may hold more than one non-FIFA nationality.

No.	Pos.	Nation	Player
1	GK	(Malaysia) MAS	Sakri Masri
2	DF	(Malaysia) MAS	Mafry Balang
3	DF	(Malaysia) MAS	Rawilson Batuil (Captain)
4	DF	(Malaysia) MAS	Dendy Lowa
5	MF	(Malaysia) MAS	Muhammad Safar
6	DF	(South Korea) KOR	Park Tae-soo
7	MF	(Turkmenistan) TKM	Ahmet Ataýew
8	MF	(Malaysia) MAS	Azzizan Nordin (Vice-captain)
9	FW	(Serbia) SRB	Rodoljub Paunović
10	FW	(Angola) ANG	Aguinaldo
11	FW	(Malaysia) MAS	Alto Linus
12	MF	(Malaysia) MAS	Melky Balang
13	GK	(Malaysia) MAS	Robson Rendy
14	DF	(Malaysia) MAS	Jenius Karib
15	DF	(Malaysia) MAS	Randy Baruh

No.	Pos.	Nation	Player
16	MF	(Malaysia) MAS	Justin Samaan
17	FW	(Malaysia) MAS	Ariusdius Jais
18	FW	(Malaysia) MAS	Azwan Fattah
19	MF	(Malaysia) MAS	Ummareng Bacok
20	MF	(Malaysia) MAS	Ricco Nigel
21	FW	(Malaysia) MAS	Maxius Musa
22	MF	(Malaysia) MAS	Elias Sulaiman
23	MF	(Malaysia) MAS	Sabri Sahar
24	MF	(Malaysia) MAS	Syukri Baharun
25	DF	(Malaysia) MAS	Evan Wensley
26	FW	(Malaysia) MAS	Rahman Shah
27	FW	(Malaysia) MAS	Stanley Sulong
28	MF	(Malaysia) MAS	Mazlan Yahya
29	DF	(Malaysia) MAS	Ranilson Batuil
30	GK	(Malaysia) MAS	Rozaimie Rohim

== Transfers ==
=== 1st leg ===
In: Note: Flags indicate national team as defined under FIFA eligibility rules; some limited exceptions apply. Players may hold more than one non-FIFA nationality.

No.	Pos.	Nation	Player
6	DF	(South Korea) KOR	Park Tae-soo (from (South Korea) Hwaseong)
9	FW	(Brazil) BRA	Luiz Júnior (from (Egypt) Mokawloon)
10	MF	(Serbia) SRB	Luka Milunović (from (Serbia) Voždovac)

Out: Note: Flags indicate national team as defined under FIFA eligibility rules; some limited exceptions apply. Players may hold more than one non-FIFA nationality.

No.	Pos.	Nation	Player
5	DF	(Zambia) ZAM	Francis Kasonde
6	DF	(Malaysia) MAS	Darwira Sazan
9	FW	(Puerto Rico) PUR	Héctor Ramos
17	FW	(Malaysia) MAS	Leopold Alphonso
51	MF	(Japan) JPN	Keisuke Ogawa

=== 2nd leg ===
In: Note: Flags indicate national team as defined under FIFA eligibility rules; some limited exceptions apply. Players may hold more than one non-FIFA nationality.

No.	Pos.	Nation	Player
7	MF	(Turkmenistan) TKM	Ahmet Ataýew (from (Indonesia) Persela)
10	FW	(Angola) ANG	Aguinaldo (from (Romania) Politehnica Iași)

Out: Note: Flags indicate national team as defined under FIFA eligibility rules; some limited exceptions apply. Players may hold more than one non-FIFA nationality.

No.	Pos.	Nation	Player
7	FW	(Brazil) BRA	Luiz Júnior
10	MF	(Serbia) SRB	Luka Milunović

== Competitions ==
=== Overview ===
Competition	Record							
Competition	Pld	W	D	L	GF	GA	GD	Win %
Premier League	20	13	4	3	33	17	+16	65.00
FA Cup	1	0	0	1	0	1	−1	0.00
Malaysia Cup	0	0	0	0	0	0	+0	—
Total	21	13	4	4	33	18	+15	61.90

Source: Competitions

=== Malaysia Premier League ===
==== Table ====
Pos	Team	Pld	W	D	L	GF	GA	GD	Pts	Qualification or relegation
1	Sabah (C, P)	20	13	4	3	33	17	+16	43	Promotion to Super League and Qualification for the Malaysia Cup group stage
2	Johor Darul Ta'zim II (Note: Johor Darul Ta'zim II and Terengganu II cannot be promoted from Premier League and play for Malaysia Cup as Johor Darul Ta'zim F.C. and Terengganu F.C. (their parent clubs) remain in Super League and play for Malaysia Cup. Should Johor Darul Ta'zim and Terengganu be relegated to Premier League or will not play for Malaysia Cup, Johor Darul Ta'zim II and Terengganu II will have to drop to M3 League or will play for Malaysia Cup.)	20	9	6	5	31	19	+12	33	
3	PDRM (P)	20	9	3	8	30	27	+3	30	Promotion to Super League and Qualification for the Malaysia Cup group stage
4	Terengganu II	20	8	6	6	21	24	−3	30	
5	UiTM (Note: UiTM F.C. is promoted to replaced PKNS F.C. relegated after withdrawing license to complete for the 2020 Malaysia Premier League season as they become feeder club to Selangor FA.) (P)	20	8	5	7	33	25	+8	29	Promotion to Super League and Qualification for the Malaysia Cup group stage

Source: MFL
Rules for classification: 1) Points; 2) Goal difference; 3) Number of goals scored.
(C) Champions; (P) Promoted

==== Results summary ====
Overall								Home						Away					
Pld	W	D	L	GF	GA	GD	Pts	W	D	L	GF	GA	GD	W	D	L	GF	GA	GD
20	13	4	3	33	17	+16	43	8	1	1	20	7	+13	5	3	2	13	10	+3

Source: Fixtures and Results

==== Results by matchday ====
Match	1	2	3	4	5	6	7	8	9	10	11	12	13	14	15	16	17	18	19	20	21	22
Ground	H	A	H	A	H	A	H	A	H	H	A	H	H	A	A	H	A	H	A	A	H	A
Result	L	D	W	W	W	D	W	L	D	W		W		W	D	W	W	W	W	W	W	L
Position	8	8	3	3	2	2	1	2	2	2	3	2	3	3	3	2	1	1	1	1	1	1

Updated to match(es) played on 20 July 2019. Source: Fixtures and Results
A = Away; H = Home; W = Win; D = Draw; L = Loss

==== Fixtures and Results ====
The Malaysian Football League (MFL) announced the fixtures for the 2019 season on 22 December 2018.

2 February 2019 1	Sabah	1–2	Johor Darul Ta'zim II	Kota Kinabalu
20:15 MYT (UTC+8)	Milunović 13'; Rawilson (yellow card) 40'; Ricco (yellow card) 77'	Report	Ghaddar 64'; Rozaimi 83'	Stadium: Likas Sports Complex Football Stadium; Referee: Fusser Mad Salleh

8 February 2019 2	Kelantan	3–3	Sabah	Kota Bharu
21:00 MYT (UTC+8)	Flávio 6' (pen.); Khairul Asyraf (yellow card) 10'; Rawilson 53' (o.g.); Haqim 89', (yellow card) 61' (yellow-red card) 89'; Azwan (yellow card) 90+5'	Report	Milunović 12'; Park (yellow card) 39'; Maxius 78', 89'; Ricco (yellow card) 90+1'	Stadium: Sultan Muhammad IV Stadium; Referee: Zulkifli Ahmad

16 February 2019 3	Sabah	3–1	Terengganu II	Kota Kinabalu
20:15 MYT (UTC+8)	Park (yellow card) 22', (goal) 50'; Milunović 65'; Ricco 74'	Report	Shukur (yellow card) 16'; Ramzi 40'	Stadium: Likas Sports Complex Football Stadium; Referee: Ridzuan Rozali

23 February 2019 4	Sarawak	1–2	Sabah	Kuching
16:15 MYT (UTC+8)	Shamie (yellow card) 30'; Henrique 44'	Report	Randy (yellow card) 25'; Ricco (yellow card) 26'; Dendy (yellow card) 31'; Paunović 36'; Sabri 39'; Rawilson (yellow card) 45+1'	Stadium: Sarawak State Stadium; Referee: Jeevanathan A/L Ponniamoorthy

2 March 2019 5	Sabah	3–1	PDRM	Kota Kinabalu
20:15 MYT (UTC+8)	Azzizan (yellow card) 1'; Júnior 4', 48'; Dendy (yellow card) 34'; Paunović 43'	Report	Redžović 53'; Khairul Izuan (yellow card) 85'	Stadium: Likas Sports Complex Football Stadium; Referee: Faiz Jamaluddin

9 March 2019 6	Negeri Sembilan	0–0	Sabah	Seremban
21:00 MYT (UTC+8)	Kumar (yellow card) 76'; Almir (yellow card) 89'	Report	Azzizan (yellow card) 71'; Park (yellow card) 87'	Stadium: Tuanku Abdul Rahman Stadium; Referee: Shahrizan Solihin

30 March 2019 7	Sabah	2–0	Penang	Kota Kinabalu
20:15 MYT (UTC+8)	Júnior 3', 54'; Maxsius (yellow card) 62'	Report	Qayyum (yellow card) 36'	Stadium: Likas Sports Complex Football Stadium; Referee: Muhammad Khairulsyahmi

6 April 2019 8	Selangor United	2–1	Sabah	Selayang
16:45 MYT (UTC+8)	Agüero 38'; Fauzan 71'; Agüero (yellow card) 77'; Anzité (yellow card) 77'	Report	Azzizan (yellow card) 10'; Rawilson (yellow card) 72'; Alto 89'	Stadium: Selayang Municipal Council Stadium; Referee: Faizudin Ismail

13 April 2019 9	Sabah	1–1	UiTM	Kota Kinabalu
20:15 MYT (UTC+8)	Milunović (yellow card) 7'; Paunović 49'	Report	Syed Ariff (yellow card) 21'; Mendy 84'	Stadium: Likas Sports Complex Football Stadium; Referee: Zulkifli Ahmad

20 April 2019 10	Sabah	3–1	UKM	Kota Kinabalu
20:15 MYT (UTC+8)	Rawilson (yellow card) 11'; Paunović (yellow card) 15'; Alto 21'; Dendy 45'; Paunović 60'; Park (yellow card) 87'; Randy (yellow card) 90+1'	Report	Reuben (yellow card) 18'; Hafizi 43'; Zeneyedpour (yellow card) 78'; Wan Afiq (yellow card) 87'	Stadium: Likas Sports Complex Football Stadium; Referee: Fusser Mad Salih

11	Perlis	Cancelled	Sabah	Kangar
				Stadium: Tuanku Syed Putra Stadium

4 May 2019 12	Sabah	1–0	Selangor United	Kota Kinabalu
20:15 MYT (UTC+8)	Paunović 7'; Randy (yellow card) 45+1'; Mafry (yellow card) 89'; Rawilson (yellow card) 90+8'	Report	Pavlenko (yellow card) 40'	Stadium: Likas Sports Complex Football Stadium; Referee: Zulkifli Ahmad

13	Sabah	Cancelled	Perlis	Kota Kinabalu
				Stadium: Likas Sports Complex Football Stadium

17 May 2019 14	UKM	0–1	Sabah	Kuala Lumpur
22:00 MYT (UTC+8)	Tudose (yellow card) 45+2'; Roskam (yellow card) 62'	Report	Aguinaldo 49'	Stadium: Kuala Lumpur Stadium; Referee: J. Suresh

25 May 2019 15	Penang	0–0	Sabah	Penang
22:00 MYT (UTC+8)	Agüero (yellow card) 30'; Azrul (yellow card) 31'	Report	Park (yellow card) 24'; Randy (yellow card) 27'; Azzizan (yellow card) 30'; Ataýew (yellow card) 68'; Mazlan (yellow card) 90+5'	Stadium: City Stadium; Referee: Jeffri Zolkefli

15 June 2019 16	Sabah	1–0	Negeri Sembilan	Kota Kinabalu
20:15 MYT (UTC+8)	Alto 66'; Evan (yellow card) 73'; Paunović (yellow card) 75'; Rawilson (yellow card) 87'	Report	Ridzuan (yellow card) 27'; Kumar (yellow card) 64'	Stadium: Likas Sports Complex Football Stadium; Referee: Zulkifli Ahmad

19 June 2019 17	PDRM	1–2	Sabah	Malacca
21:00 MYT (UTC+8)	Lee 33'; Wark (yellow card) 10'; Agba (yellow card) 58'	Report	Mafry (yellow card) 31'; Ataýew (yellow card) 40'; Paunović 76'; Alto 82'	Stadium: Hang Jebat Stadium; Referee: Razlan Joffri Ali

26 June 2019 18	Sabah	4–1	Sarawak	Kota Kinabalu
20:15 MYT (UTC+8)	Paunović 11', 63', 84'; Aguinaldo 39'	Report	Martin (yellow card) 51'; Bobby 60'	Stadium: Likas Sports Complex Football Stadium; Referee: S. Logeswaran

5 July 2019 19	Johor Darul Ta'zim II	0–1	Sabah	Pasir Gudang
21:00 MYT (UTC+8)	Insa (yellow card) 27'; Fernández (yellow card) 40'; Fazly (yellow card) 78'	Report	Ataýew (yellow card) 45+2'; Paunović 59'; Randy (yellow card) 80'; Park (yellow card) 90+1'; Azwan (yellow card) 90+3'	Stadium: Pasir Gudang Corporation Stadium; Attendance: 2700; Referee: Suhaizi Shukri

9 July 2019 20	UiTM	1–2	Sabah	Shah Alam
21:00 MYT (UTC+8)	Nazrin (yellow card) 20'; Korać 32'	Report	Evan (yellow card) 34'; Paunović 58' (pen.); Aguinaldo 67'; Aguinaldo (yellow card) 67'; Rawilson (yellow card) 71'	Stadium: UiTM Stadium; Referee: Fairuzi Mat Desa

13 July 2019 21	Sabah	1–0	Kelantan	Kota Kinabalu
21:00 MYT (UTC+8)	Evan (yellow card) 46'; Ataýew 58'; Rozaimie (yellow card) 90+3'	Report	Afiq (yellow card) 46'	Stadium: Likas Sports Complex Football Stadium; Attendance: 10200; Referee: Mohamad Zamzaidi Katimin

20 July 2019 22	Terengganu II	2–1	Sabah	Kuala Terengganu
21:00 MYT (UTC+8)	Haidhir Suhaini 45+3'; Ridzuan Razali 58'	Report	Aguinaldo 64'	Stadium: Sultan Ismail Nasiruddin Shah Stadium; Referee: Ku Alauddin Ku Muhammad

=== Malaysia FA Cup ===
==== Fixture ====
3 April 2019 2nd Round	Kelantan United	1–0	Sabah	Kota Bharu
21:00 MYT (UTC+8)	Fakhrul 6'; Fadhilah (yellow card) 32'	Report	Júnior (yellow card) 45+1'	Stadium: Sultan Muhammad IV Stadium; Referee: Hamdan Awang

=== Malaysia Cup ===
==== Group stage ====
Pos	Team	Pld	W	D	L	GF	GA	GD	Pts	Qualification	PAH	PRK	PEN	SAB
1	Pahang	6	5	0	1	12	5	+7	15	Advance to knockout stage	—	3–0	3–1	1–0
2	Perak	6	2	3	1	9	7	+2	9	Advance to knockout stage	3–1	—	1–1	3–0
3	Penang	6	1	2	3	5	10	−5	5		0–2	1–1	—	2–1
4	Sabah	6	1	1	4	5	9	−4	4		1–2	1–1	2–0	—

Source: FAM MFL

4 August 2019 1	Perak	3–0	Sabah	Ipoh
21:00 MYT (UTC+8)	Eldor (yellow card) 26'; Leandro (yellow card) 37'; Gan 45'; Careca 51'; Hafizul Hakim (yellow card) 86'; Leandro 90+3'	Report	Randy (yellow card) 24'; Paunović (yellow card) 40'; Maxius (yellow card) 70'	Stadium: Perak Stadium; Referee: Suhaimi Mat Hassan

7 August 2019 2	Penang	v	Sabah	George Town
21:00 MYT (UTC+8)				Stadium: City Stadium

17 August 2019 3	Sabah	v	Pahang	Kota Kinabalu
20:15 MYT (UTC+8)				Stadium: Likas Stadium

== Statistics ==
=== Appearances ===
Last updated: 4 August 2019.
Source: Sabah FA

No.	Pos.	Name	Malaysia Premier League		Malaysia FA Cup		Malaysia Cup		Total	
No.	Pos.	Name	Apps	Goals	Apps	Goals	Apps	Goals	Apps	Goals
Goalkeepers
13	GK	(Malaysia) Robson Rendy	1	0	0	0	0	0	1	0
30	GK	(Malaysia) Rozaimie Rohim	19	0	1	0	1	0	21	0
Defenders
2	DF	(Malaysia) Mafry Balang	13	0	1	0	0	0	14	0
3	DF	(Malaysia) Rawilson Batuil	17	0	1	0	1	0	19	0
4	DF	(Malaysia) Dendy Lowa	14	1	1	0	0	0	15	1
6	DF	(South Korea) Park Tae-soo	17	1	1	0	1	0	19	1
14	DF	(Malaysia) Jenius Karib	12	0	0	0	1	0	13	0
15	DF	(Malaysia) Randy Baruh	16	0	1	0	1	0	18	0
25	DF	(Malaysia) Evan Wensley	10	0	0	0	1	0	11	0
Midfielders
5	MF	(Malaysia) Muhammad Safar	4	0	1	0	0	0	5	0
8	MF	(Malaysia) Azzizan Nordin	16	0	1	0	1	0	18	0
7	MF	(Turkmenistan) Ahmet Ataýew	8	1	0	0	1	0	9	1
16	MF	(Malaysia) Justin Samaan	2	0	0	0	0	0	2	0
18	MF	(Malaysia) Azwan Fattah	10	0	0	0	0	0	10	0
19	MF	(Malaysia) Ummareng Bacok	6	0	0	0	0	0	6	0
20	MF	(Malaysia) Ricco Nigel	13	1	1	0	1	0	15	1
22	MF	(Malaysia) Elias Sulaiman	1	0	0	0	0	0	1	0
23	MF	(Malaysia) Sabri Sahar	7	1	0	0	0	0	7	1
Forwards
9	FW	(Serbia) Rodoljub Paunović	19	11	1	0	1	0	21	11
10	FW	(Angola) Aguinaldo	9	3	0	0	1	0	10	3
11	FW	(Malaysia) Alto Linus	12	4	0	0	1	0	13	4
21	FW	(Malaysia) Maxius Musa	13	2	1	0	1	0	15	2
26	FW	(Malaysia) Rahman Shah	7	0	0	0	1	0	8	0
28	FW	(Malaysia) Mazlan Yahya	3	0	0	0	0	0	3	0
Players transferred out during the season
7	FW	(Brazil) Luiz Júnior	9	4	1	0	0	0	10	4
10	MF	(Serbia) Luka Milunović	9	3	1	0	0	0	10	3
