= 2020 Sabah FA season =

Sabah
2020 season
- President: Peter Anthony
- Manager: Henry Saimpon
- Head coach: Kurniawan Dwi Yulianto
- Stadium: Likas Stadium
- Malaysia Super League: 10th
- Malaysia FA Cup: Cancelled
- Malaysia Cup: Cancelled
- Top goalscorer: League: Rodoljub Paunović; Dennis Buschening (4); All: Rodoljub Paunović; Dennis Buschening (4)

The 2020 season was Sabah's fifth competitive season in the highest tier of Malaysian football since the foundation of Malaysia Super League in 2004. It is also the 1st season for Sabah to play in Malaysia Super League after winning the 2019 Malaysia Premier League which got promoted. Along with the Malaysia Super League, the club participated in the Malaysia FA Cup and the Malaysia Cup.

== Players ==
Note: Flags indicate national team as defined under FIFA eligibility rules; some limited exceptions apply. Players may hold more than one non-FIFA nationality.

No.	Pos.	Nation	Player
1	GK	(Malaysia) MAS	Wan Azraie
2	DF	(Malaysia) MAS	Mafry Balang
3	DF	(Malaysia) MAS	Rawilson Batuil (captain)
4	DF	(Malaysia) MAS	Dendy Lowa
6	DF	(South Korea) KOR	Park Tae-soo
7	MF	(Malaysia) MAS	Ricco Nigel Milus
8	MF	(Malaysia) MAS	Azzizan Nordin (vice-captain)
9	FW	(France) FRA	Guy Gnabouyou
10	MF	(Namibia) NAM	Petrus Shitembi
11	MF	(Malaysia) MAS	Alto Linus
13	MF	(Malaysia) MAS	Hamran Peter
14	DF	(Malaysia) MAS	Jenius Karib
15	DF	(Malaysia) MAS	Randy Baruh
16	DF	(Malaysia) MAS	Zubir Azmi

No.	Pos.	Nation	Player
17	FW	(Malaysia) MAS	Ariusdius Jais
18	MF	(Malaysia) MAS	Azwan Fattah
19	MF	(Malaysia) MAS	Ummareng Bacok
20	FW	(Serbia) SRB	Rodoljub Paunović
21	FW	(Malaysia) MAS	Maxsius Musa
22	GK	(Malaysia) MAS	Rendy Rining
23	MF	(Malaysia) MAS	Sabri Sahar
24	MF	(Malaysia) MAS	Syukri Baharun
25	DF	(Malaysia) MAS	Evan Wensley
27	FW	(Malaysia) MAS	Stanley Sulong
28	MF	(Malaysia) MAS	Mazlan Yahya
29	FW	(Malaysia) MAS	Shahrizam Sahar
30	GK	(Malaysia) MAS	Rozaimie Rohim
93	MF	(Thailand) THA	Dennis Buschening

== Competitions ==
=== Overview ===
Competition	Record							
Competition	Pld	W	D	L	GF	GA	GD	Win %
Super League	4	1	2	1	5	5	+0	25.00
FA Cup	0	0	0	0	0	0	+0	—
Total	4	1	2	1	5	5	+0	25.00

Source: Competitions

=== Malaysia Super League ===
==== Table ====
Pos	Team	Pld	W	D	L	GF	GA	GD	Pts	Qualification or relegation
8	Pahang	11	4	2	5	18	18	0	14	
9	Melaka United	11	4	2	5	13	16	−3	11 (Note: Melaka have been docked three points following the decision from FAM.)	
10	Sabah	11	2	3	6	12	24	−12	9	
11	Felda United (R)	11	1	4	6	12	27	−15	7	Relegation to Malaysia Premier League
12	PDRM (R)	11	0	2	9	5	29	−24	−1 (Note: PDRM have been docked three points following the decision from FAM.)	Relegation to Malaysia Premier League

Source: Malaysian Football League
Rules for classification: 1) Points; 2) Goal difference; 3) Number of goals scored.
(R) Relegated

==== Results summary ====
Overall								Home						Away					
Pld	W	D	L	GF	GA	GD	Pts	W	D	L	GF	GA	GD	W	D	L	GF	GA	GD
4	1	2	1	5	5	0	5	1	1	0	5	3	+2	0	1	1	0	2	−2

Source: Fixtures and Results

==== Results by matchday ====
Match	1	2	3	4	5
Ground	A	H	A	H	A
Result	D	W	L	D	
Position	7	4	5	4	

Updated to match(es) played on 20 March 2020. Source: Fixtures and Results
A = Away; H = Home; W = Win; D = Draw; L = Loss

==== Fixtures and results ====
1 March 2020 1	PDRM	0–0	Sabah	Kuala Lumpur
21:00 MYT (UTC+8)	Syahmi Shukri (yellow card) 16'; Christopher Keli (substituted off) 60'; Alif Naqiuddin (substituted in) 60' (yellow card) 75'; Eskandar Ismail (substituted off) 88'; Dick Cheney Waili (substituted in) 88'; Nizam Rodzi (substituted off) 90+4'; Khairul Izuan (substituted in) 90+4'	Report	Dennis Buschening (substituted off) 46'; Azwan Fattah (substituted in) 46'; Randy Baruh (yellow card) 65'; Rodoljub Paunović (substituted off) 85'; Ummareng Bacok (substituted in) 85'	Stadium: Kuala Lumpur Stadium; Referee: Tuan Mohd Yaasin

7 March 2020 2	Sabah	3–1	Felda United	Kota Kinabalu
20:15 MYT (UTC+8)	Rodoljub Paunović 12'; Rawilson Batuil (yellow card) 24'; Park Tae-soo 39'; Azzizan Nordin (yellow card) 44'; Guy Gnabouyou (substituted off) 75'; Alto Linus (substituted in) 75'; Ummareng Bacok (substituted off) 76'; Maxius Musa (substituted in) 76' (goal) 78'; Azwan Fattah (substituted off) 85'; Hamran Peter (substituted in) 85' (yellow card) 88'	Report	Frédéric Bulot (substituted off) 45+3'; Haiqal Azhar (substituted in) 45+3'; Ezanie Salleh (substituted off) 60'; Nikola Raspopović (substituted in) 60'; Khairul Amri 74'; Faiz Mazlan (substituted off) 85'; Fadhil Idris (substituted in) 85'; Jasazrin Jamaluddin (yellow card) 90+4'; Haziq Puad (yellow card) 90+6'	Stadium: Likas Stadium; Referee: Wan Tarmizi Wan Ibrahim

10 March 2020 3	Pahang	2–0	Sabah	Kuantan
21:00 MYT (UTC+8)	Ivan Carlos 20' (yellow card) 60' (substituted off) 79'; Herold Goulon 50' (pen.); Faisal Halim (substituted off) 70'; Nik Sharif Haseefy (substituted in) 70'; Dinesh Rajasingam (substituted in) 79'	Report	Zubir Azmi (yellow card) 30'; Azwan Fattah (substituted off) 46'; Alto Linus (substituted in) 46' (substituted off) 83'; Ummareng Bacok (substituted off) 73'; Maxius Musa (substituted in) 73' (yellow card) 89'; Hamran Peter (substituted in) 83'	Stadium: Darul Makmur Stadium; Referee: Tuan Mohd Yaasin

14 March 2020 4	Sabah	2–2	Perak	Kota Kinabalu
20:15 MYT (UTC+8)	Azzizan Nordin 5' (substituted off) 70'; Guy Gnabouyou 27'; Randy Baruh (yellow card) 41'; Rodoljub Paunović (yellow card) 45+1' (substituted off) 76'; Maxius Musa (yellow card) 45+2' (substituted off) 60'; Ummareng Bacok (substituted in) 60'; Hamran Peter (substituted in) 70'; Dennis Buschening (substituted in) 76'; Rawilson Batuil (yellow card) 90+3'	Report	Shahrel Fikri 17', 80'; Shahrul Saad (yellow card) 35'; Kenny Pallraj (yellow card) 56' (substituted off) 68'; Firdaus Saiyadi (yellow card) 66'; Farid Khazali (substituted in) 68'; Thierry Chantha Bin (substituted off) 74'; Hafiz Ramdan (substituted in) 74'; Rafiuddin Roddin (substituted off) 81'; Nazirul Naim (substituted in) 81'	Stadium: Likas Stadium; Referee: Zulkarnain Zakaria

~~3 April 2020~~ (Postponed) 5	Terengganu	v	Sabah	Kuala Nerus
21:00 MYT (UTC+8)		Report		Stadium: Sultan Mizan Zainal Abidin Stadium

=== Malaysia FA Cup ===
==== Fixture ====
~~17 March 2020~~ (Postponed) R2	Sabah	v	Kuala Lumpur	Kota Kinabalu
20:15 MYT (UTC+8)				Stadium: Likas Stadium

== Statistics ==
=== Squad statistics ===
No.	Pos	Nat	Player	Total		League		FA Cup	
No.	Pos	Nat	Player	Apps	Goals	Apps	Goals	Apps	Goals
Goalkeepers
13	GK	(Malaysia)	Wan Azraie	3	0	3	0	0	0
22	GK	(Malaysia)	Robson Rendy Rining	0	0	0	0	0	0
30	GK	(Malaysia)	Rozaimie Rohim	1	0	1	0	0	0
Defenders
2	DF	(Malaysia)	Mafry Balang	0	0	0	0	0	0
3	DF	(Malaysia)	Rawilson Batuil	4	0	4	0	0	0
4	DF	(Malaysia)	Dendy Lowa	0	0	0	0	0	0
6	DF	(South Korea)	Park Tae-soo	4	1	4	1	0	0
14	DF	(Malaysia)	Jenius Karib	0	0	0	0	0	0
15	DF	(Malaysia)	Randy Baruh	4	0	4	0	0	0
16	DF	(Malaysia)	Zubir Azmi	4	0	4	0	0	0
25	DF	(Malaysia)	Evan Wensley	0	0	0	0	0	0
Midfielders
7	MF	(Malaysia)	Ricco Nigel Milus	0	0	0	0	0	0
8	MF	(Malaysia)	Azzizan Nordin	4	1	4	1	0	0
10	MF	(Namibia)	Petrus Shitembi	4	0	4	0	0	0
11	MF	(Malaysia)	Alto Linus	4	0	4	0	0	0
13	MF	(Malaysia)	Hamran Peter	3	0	3	0	0	0
18	MF	(Malaysia)	Mohd Azwan Abdul Fattah	3	0	3	0	0	0
19	MF	(Malaysia)	Ummareng Bacok	4	0	4	0	0	0
23	MF	(Malaysia)	Sabri Sahar	0	0	0	0	0	0
24	MF	(Malaysia)	Mohd Syukri Baharun	0	0	0	0	0	0
28	MF	(Malaysia)	Mazlan Yahya	0	0	0	0	0	0
Forwards
17	FW	(Malaysia)	Arius Dius Jais	0	0	0	0	0	0
20	FW	(Serbia)	Rodoljub Paunović	4	1	4	1	0	0
21	FW	(Malaysia)	Maxius Musa	3	1	3	1	0	0
27	FW	(Malaysia)	Stanley Sulong	0	0	0	0	0	0
29	FW	(Malaysia)	Shahrizam Sahar	0	0	0	0	0	0
93	MF	(Thailand)	Dennis Buschening	2	0	2	0	0	0
9	FW	(France)	Guy Gnabouyou	3	1	3	1	0	0
	FW	(Puerto Rico)	Héctor Ramos‡	1	0	1	0	0	0

Last updated: 14 March 2020
Source: Stadium Astro

- ^{‡} Player left the club mid-season

=== Clean sheets ===
As of 15 March 2020

Rank	Name	Super League	FA Cup	Total
1	(Malaysia) Wan Azraie	1	0	1
Total		1	0	1
