= 2022 Sabah F.C. season =

Football club season

Sabah
2022 season
- CEO: Khairul Firdaus Akbar Khan
- Manager: Ahmad Marzuki Nasir
- Head coach: Ong Kim Swee
- Stadium: Likas Stadium
- Malaysia Super League: 3rd
- Malaysia FA Cup: Quarter Final
- Malaysia Cup: Semi Final
- Top goalscorer: League: Park Tae-Soo (8); All: Baddrol Bakhtiar; Park Tae-Soo (8)
- Highest home attendance: 23,523 vs Johor Darul Ta'zim
- Lowest home attendance: 1,096 vs Respect F.C.
- Average home league attendance: 8,996 (League); 7,645 (FA Cup); 8,446 (Malaysia Cup)
- Biggest win: Sabah 4–0 Kedah Darul Aman
- Biggest defeat: Johor Darul Ta'zim 3–0 Sabah

The 2022 season was Sabah's seventh competitive season in the highest tier of Malaysian football since the foundation of Malaysia Super League in 2004. It is also the third season for Sabah to play in Malaysia Super League after winning the 2019 Malaysia Premier League which got promoted.

== Players ==
=== First-team squad ===
As of 1 July 2022

Jersey No.	Position	Name	Nationality	Date of birth (age)
1	GK	Ramzi Mustakim	(Malaysia)	1999
19	GK	Khairul Fahmi Che Mat	(Malaysia)	7 January 1989 (age 37)
31	GK	Damien Lim	(Malaysia)	15 February 1997 (age 29)
2	DF	Abdul Hanafie Tokyo	(Malaysia)	25 March 1999 (age 27)
3	DF	Rawilson Batuil	(Malaysia)	29 April 1994 (age 32)
4	DF	Jackson de Souza	(Brazil)	1 May 1990 (age 36)
5	DF	Gerald Gadit	(Malaysia)	16 May 1999 (age 27)
13	DF	Badrul Afendy Fadzli	(Malaysia)	1 September 1993 (age 33)
15	DF	Rizal Ghazali	(Malaysia)	1 October 1992 (age 33)
21	DF	Nazirul Naim	(Malaysia)	6 April 1996 (age 30)
33	DF	Dominic Tan	(Malaysia) (Singapore)	12 March 1997 (age 29)
6	MF	Park Tae-Soo	(South Korea)	1 December 1989 (age 36)
7	MF	Baddrol Bakhtiar (captain)	(Malaysia)	1 February 1988 (age 38)
8	MF	Tommy Mawat Bada	(Malaysia)	26 June 1996 (age 30)
11	MF	Alto Linus	(Malaysia)	25 September 1986 (age 40)
20	MF	Gary Steven Robbat	(Malaysia)	3 September 1993 (age 33)
22	MF	Stuart Wilkin	(Malaysia) (England)	12 March 1998 (age 28)
29	MF	Ummareng Bacok	(Malaysia)	7 June 1994 (age 32)
77	MF	Irfan Fazail	(Malaysia)	12 April 1991 (age 35)
88	MF	Maxsius Musa	(Malaysia)	21 May 1993 (age 33)
10	FW	Taiki Kagayama	(Japan)	14 May 1996 (age 30)
12	FW	Thanabalan Nadarajah	(Malaysia)	3 May 1993 (age 33)
17	FW	Amri Yahyah	(Malaysia)	21 January 1981 (age 45)
27	FW	Dirga Surdi	(Malaysia)	11 July 1999 (age 27)
67	FW	Saddil Ramdani	(Indonesia)	2 January 1999 (age 27)
69	FW	Sahrizan Saidin	(Malaysia)	1999
80	FW	Azhad Harraz	(Malaysia)	9 March 2003 (age 23)
Transfer In
9	FW	Farhan Roslan	(Malaysia)	3 December 1996 (age 29)
70	FW	Jose Embalo	(Guinea-Bissau)	16 May 1993 (age 33)
Transfer Out
9	FW	Neto Pessoa	(Brazil)	16 May 1994 (age 32)

== Friendly matches ==
Win Draw Loss

=== Pre-season friendlies ===
15 January 2022	Sabah	1-1	Kinabalu Jaguar F.C.	Kota Kinabalu
20:15 MYT		Report		Stadium: Likas Stadium

27 January 2022	Sabah	0-1	Kuching City	Kota Kinabalu
20:15 MYT		Report		Stadium: Likas Stadium

5 February 2022	Sabah	1-1	Malaysia U-23	Kota Kinabalu
20:15 MYT		Report		Stadium: Likas Stadium

=== SMJ Cup ===
12 February 2022 Matchday 1	Sabah	1–2	Kelantan	Kota Kinabalu
21:00 MYT	Ramdani 51'	Report	Alifh Aiman 71'; Belfort 86' (pen.)	Stadium: Likas Stadium

15 February 2022 Matchday 2	Sabah	2–1	Sarawak United	Kota Kinabalu
21:00 MYT	Baddrol 9'; Thanabalan 90+3'	Report	Agba 89'	Stadium: Likas Stadium

18 February 2022 Matchday 3	Sabah	1–0	Kedah Darul Aman	Kota Kinabalu
21:00 MYT	Neto Pessoa 52'	Report		Stadium: Likas Stadium

=== Indonesia Tour ===
5 June 2022	Persija Jakarta (Indonesia)	1–2	(Malaysia) Sabah	Bekasi, Indonesia
16:00 WIB; 17:00 MYT	Taufik Hidayat 58'		Neto Pessoa 3'; Park 62'	Stadium: Patriot Candrabhaga

7 June 2022	Bhayangkara (Indonesia)	2–1	(Malaysia) Sabah	Indonesia
16:00 WIB; 17:00 MYT

10 June 2022	Persiba (Indonesia)	0–0	(Malaysia) Sabah	Indonesia

== Competitions ==
=== Overview ===
Competition	First match	Last match	Starting round	Final position	Record							
Competition	First match	Last match	Starting round	Final position	Pld	W	D	L	GF	GA	GD	Win %
Super League	4 March 2022	15 October 2022	Matchday 1	3rd	22	13	3	6	36	26	+10	59.09
FA Cup	12 March 2022	23 July 2022	First Round	Quarter Final	3	2	0	1	4	3	+1	66.67
Malaysia Cup	26 October 2022	20 November 2022	Round of 16	Semi Final	6	2	2	2	6	7	−1	33.33
Total					31	17	5	9	46	36	+10	54.84

Last updated: 20 November 2022
Source: FAM-CMS

=== Malaysia Super League ===
==== League table ====
Pos	Team	Pld	W	D	L	GF	GA	GD	Pts	Qualification or relegation
1	Johor Darul Ta'zim	22	17	5	0	61	12	+49	56	Qualification for AFC Champions League group stage
2	Terengganu	22	14	2	6	39	20	+19	44	Qualification for AFC Cup group stage
3	Sabah	22	13	3	6	36	26	+10	42	Qualification for AFC Cup group stage
4	Negeri Sembilan	22	12	5	5	33	26	+7	41	
5	Selangor	22	8	6	8	39	33	+6	30	

Updated to match(es) played on unknown. Source: MFL
Rules for classification: 1) Points; 2) Goal difference; 3) Number of goals scored.

==== Results summary ====
Overall								Home						Away					
Pld	W	D	L	GF	GA	GD	Pts	W	D	L	GF	GA	GD	W	D	L	GF	GA	GD
22	13	3	6	36	26	+10	42	7	1	3	23	13	+10	6	2	3	13	13	0

Source: FAM-CMS

==== Results by round ====
Round	1	2	3	4	5	6	7	8	9	10	11	12	13	14	15	16	17	18	19	20	21	22
Ground	H	H	A	A	A	H	A(P)	H(P)	A	H	H(P)	A	A	H	H	H(P)	A	H	A	H	A	A
Result	L	W	W	W	L	W	D	W	W	W	L	W	W	W	W	D	D	L	L	W	W	L
Position	11	3	4	2	3	2	3	4	2	2	3	2	2	2	2	2	2	2	2	2	2	3

Source: FAM
A = Away; H = Home; W = Win; D = Draw; L = Loss; P = Postponed

==== Fixtures and Results ====
Win Draw Loss

4 March 2022 1	Sabah	0–1	Negeri Sembilan	Kota Kinabalu
19:30 MYT	Tommy Mawat (yellow card) 38'; Irfan Fazail (yellow card) 76'	Report	Che Rashid (yellow card) 34'; Jones 52'	Stadium: Likas Stadium; Attendance: 2,343; Referee: Zulkarnain bin Zakaria; Man of the Match: Khair Jones (Negeri Sembilan)

9 March 2022 2	Sabah	3–1	Petaling Jaya City	Kota Kinabalu
19:30 MYT	Jackson 15'; Neto Pessoa 35'; Park (yellow card) 44'; Ramdani 48'	Report	Kumaahran 45+1'; R.Vengadesan (yellow card) 54'	Stadium: Likas Stadium; Attendance: 2,655; Referee: Tuan Mohd Yaasin bin Tuan Mohd Hanafiah; Man of the Match: Jackson de Souza (Sabah)

5 April 2022 3	Melaka United	0–1	Sabah	Malacca
22:00 MYT	Fakhrullah (yellow card) 57'	Report	Park 25'; Tommy Mawat (yellow card) 62'; Ummareng Bacok (yellow card) 90+2'	Stadium: Hang Jebat Stadium; Attendance: 1,279; Referee: S. Logeswaran; Man of the Match: Park Tae-Soo (Sabah)

10 April 2022 4	Sarawak United	0–1	Sabah	Kuching
21:15 MYT	Khairil (yellow card) 45+3'; Soto (yellow card) 90+4'; Zharmien Ismail (yellow card) 90+6'	Report	Park (yellow card) 45+1'; Baddrol 81' (pen.); Khairul Fahmi (yellow card) 90+2'; Amri (yellow card) 90+4'	Stadium: Sarawak Stadium; Attendance: 1,031; Referee: Mohd Nafeez Abd Wahab; Man of the Match: Taiki Kagayama (Sabah)

16 April 2022 5	Kuala Lumpur City	2–0	Sabah	Kuala Lumpur
20:15 MYT	Morales 36', 88'; Kamal (yellow card) 41'; Hadin (yellow card) 84'	Report	Rizal (yellow card) 27'	Stadium: Kuala Lumpur Stadium; Attendance: 1,601; Referee: Tuan Mohd Yaasin bin Tuan Mohd Hanafiah; Man of the Match: Romel Morales (Kuala Lumpur City)

24 April 2022 6	Sabah	4–0	Kedah Darul Aman	Kota Kinabalu
21:15 MYT	Park (yellow card) 30'; Amri 51', 61', 72'; Park 56'; Robbat (yellow card) 90+3'	Report	Syafiq (yellow card) 30'; Jang (yellow card) 41'; Rodney Celvin (yellow card) 53'	Stadium: Likas Stadium; Attendance: 3,177; Referee: Fitri bin Maskon; Man of the Match: Amri Yahyah (Sabah)

28 June 2022 7	Selangor	1–1	Sabah	Petaling Jaya
21:00 MYT	Caion 3' (yellow card) 90+2'; Hyuri (yellow card) 62'; Sharul Nazeem (yellow card) 83'; Yazan Al-Arab (yellow card) 90'	Report	Jackson (yellow card) 28'; Robbat (yellow card) 32'; Saddil 53'; Baddrol (yellow card) 78'	Stadium: Petaling Jaya Stadium; Attendance: 3,249; Referee: Mohd Nafeez Abd Wahab; Man of the Match: Brendan Gan (Selangor)

19 July 2022 8	Sabah	2–1	Terengganu	Kota Kinabalu
20:15 MYT	Park 72', 79'	Report	Manny Ott 45+2'	Stadium: Likas Stadium; Attendance: 7,210; Referee: Mohammad Zamzaidi bin Katimin; Man of the Match: Park Tae-Soo (Sabah)

17 May 2022 9	Penang	2–4	Sabah	George Town
21:00 MYT	Saravanan (yellow card) 35' (goal) 51'; El-Helwe 76'; Latiff (yellow card) 80'	Report	Baddrol 23', 60'; Saddil (yellow card) 28'; Amri (yellow card) 39'; Jackson 57'; Wilkin 66'; Azhad Harraz (yellow card) 82'	Stadium: City Stadium; Attendance: 1,065; Referee: Suhaizi Shukri; Man of the Match: Baddrol Bakhtiar (Sabah)

18 June 2022 10	Sabah	2–1	Sri Pahang	Kota Kinabalu
20:15 MYT	Neto Pessoa 10'; Taiki Kagayama 18'; Rawilson (yellow card) 90+1'	Report	Hidalgo 60' (pen.); Baqiuddin Shamsudin (yellow card) 62'	Stadium: Likas Stadium; Attendance: 6,372; Referee: Fitri bin Maskon; Man of the Match: Taiki Kagayama (Sabah)

15 July 2022 11	Sabah	1–2	Johor Darul Ta'zim	Kota Kinabalu
20:15 MYT	Park 19'; Ramdani (yellow card) 33'; Park (yellow card) 43'; Embalo (yellow card) 90+4'	Report	Forestieri 26', 90+5'; Matthew Davies (yellow card) 89'; Velazquez (yellow card) 90+4'; Shane Lowry (yellow card) 90+5'	Stadium: Likas Stadium; Attendance: 23,523; Referee: Mohd Fusser bin Mad Sallih; Man of the Match: Fernando Forestieri (Johor Darul Ta'zim)

3 July 2022 12	Negeri Sembilan	0–1	Sabah	Seremban
20:15 MYT	Matheus Alves (yellow card) 20'; Selvan Anbualagan (yellow card) 86'	Report	Park 56'; Jackson de Souza (yellow card) 90+1'	Stadium: Tuanku Abdul Rahman Stadium; Attendance: 8,957; Referee: Mohd Amirul Izwan bin Yaacob; Man of the Match: Park Tae-Soo (Sabah)

26 July 2022 13	Petaling Jaya City	1–2	Sabah	Petaling Jaya
20:15 MYT	Lok 34'; Salamon Raj (yellow card) 77'	Report	Kagayama 48'; Irfan Fazail 75'; Stuart Wilkin (yellow card) 85'	Stadium: Petaling Jaya Stadium; Attendance: 1,083; Referee: Tuan Mohd Yaasin bin Tuan Mohd Hanafiah; Man of the Match: Khairul Fahmi Che Mat (Sabah)

31 July 2022 14	Sabah	2–1	Melaka United	Kota Kinabalu
19:30 MYT	Park (yellow card) 58'; Amri 65', 90+1'; Rawilson (red card) 90+5'	Report	Syazwan (yellow card) 6'; Ifedayo 24'; Adriano (yellow card) 37'; Emmanuel Oti (yellow card) 45+2'; Haziq Puad (red card) 90+4'	Stadium: Likas Stadium; Attendance: 10,192; Referee: Muhammad Nazmi bin Nasaruddin; Man of the Match: Amri Yahyah (Sabah)

9 August 2022 15	Sabah	1-0	Sarawak United	Kota Kinabalu
20:15 MYT	Baddrol 63'	Report		Stadium: Likas Stadium; Attendance: 10,073; Referee: S. Logeswaran; Man of the Match: Baddrol Bakhtiar (Sabah)

1 September 2022 16	Sabah	2–2	Kuala Lumpur City	Kota Kinabalu
19:30 MYT	Dominic 47'; Amri (yellow card) 81'; Saddil 85'	Report	Gallifuoco 5'; Ryan (yellow card) 18'; Akram 61'; Akram (yellow card) 80'	Stadium: Likas Stadium; Attendance: 10,333; Referee: Mohammad Zamzaidi bin Katimin; Man of the Match: Saddil Ramdani (Sabah)

17 August 2022 17	Kedah Darul Aman	1–1	Sabah	Alor Setar
21:00 MYT	Ronald Ngah 6'; Akmal Zahir 69'		Rizal (yellow card) 51'; Farhan 84'	Stadium: Darul Aman Stadium; Attendance: 5,621; Referee: Muhammad Nazmi bin Nazaruddin; Man of the Match: Al-Hafiz Harun (Kedah)

10 September 2022 18	Sabah	2–3	Selangor	Kota Kinabalu
19:00 MYT	Baddrol 30'; Embalo 41'; Ghazali (yellow card) 71'	Report	Mukhairi Ajmal 24'; Brendan Gan 25'; Quentin Cheng (yellow card) 52'; Hein Htet Aung 75'; Hein Htet Aungg (yellow card) 77'; Harith Haiqal (yellow card) 80'; Aliff Haiqal (yellow card) 90+1'	Stadium: Likas Stadium; Attendance: 13,388; Referee: Muhammad Usaid bin Jamal; Man of the Match: Hein Htet Aung (Selangor)

1 October 2022 19	Terengganu	2–0	Sabah	Kuala Terengganu
21:00 MYT	Papé Diakité 7'; Nik Sharif 30'; Alif Zakaria (yellow card) 30'	Report	Rizal (yellow card) 38' (yellow-red card) 77'; Gary (yellow card) 58'	Stadium: Sultan Mizan Zainal Abidin Stadium; Attendance: 11,530; Referee: Fitri bin Maskon; Man of the Match: Papé Diakité (Terengganu)

7 October 2022 20	Sabah	4–1	Penang	Kota Kinabalu
19:30 MYT	Baddrol 33'; Farhan (yellow card) 51'; Dominic Tan (yellow card) 53'; Park 72'; Saddil 80' (pen.); Stuart Wilkin 89'	Report	Endrick (yellow card) 14'; Azzizan Nordin (yellow card) 29'; Rafael Vitor (red card) 42'; Azim Rahim (yellow card) 62'; Adib Raop 70'; Jafri Chew (yellow card) 79'; Lucas Silva (yellow card) 90+3'	Stadium: Likas Stadium; Attendance: 9,688; Referee: Zulkarnain bin Zakaria; Man of the Match: Stuart Wilkin (Sabah)

11 October 2022 21	Sri Pahang	1–2	Sabah	Kuantan
20:15 MYT	Muslim Ahmad (yellow card) 40'; Azwan Aripin (yellow card) 49'; Sherzod Fayziev (yellow card) 57'; Steven Rodriguez 85'; Steven Rodriguez (yellow card) 86'; Zuhair Aizat (yellow card) 88'	Report	Thanabalan (yellow card) 37'; Park (yellow card) 67'; Gary (yellow card) 70'; Rawilson (yellow card) 75'; Dominic Tan 89'; Park 90+3'	Stadium: Darul Makmur Stadium; Attendance: 1,135; Referee: Hamdan bin Awang; Man of the Match: Khairul Fahmi Che Mat (Sabah)

15 October 2022 22	Johor Darul Ta'zim	3–0	Sabah	Iskandar Puteri
21:00 MYT	Bergson 17', 55'; Arif Aiman 39'	Report	Alto Linus (yellow card) 41'	Stadium: Sultan Ibrahim Stadium; Attendance: 34,038; Referee: Razlan bin Joffri Ali; Man of the Match: Bergson da Silva (Johor Darul Ta'zim)

=== FA Cup ===
==== Fixtures and Results ====
Win Draw Loss

12 March 2022 First Round	Sabah	2–0	Respect F.C.	Kota Kinabalu
19:30 MYT	Rawilson (yellow card) 33'; Ummareng Bacok 50'; Ummareng Bacok (yellow card) 78'; Nazirul 87'	Report	Yusof Abdullah (yellow card) 62'; Sanjef Dinesh (yellow card) 89'	Stadium: Likas Stadium; Attendance: 1,096; Referee: Mohd Shahmi bin Ismail; Man of the Match: Ummareng Bacok (Sabah)

13 May 2022 Second Round	Sabah	2–1 (a.e.t.)	Kelantan United	Kota Kinabalu
19:30 MYT	Kagayama 41'; Tommy Mawat (yellow card) 79'; Saddil (yellow card) 107'; Saddil 111'	Report	Fakhrul Zaman (yellow card) 56'; Jacob Njoku 67'; Syamsul Saad (Coach) (yellow card) 118'	Stadium: Likas Stadium; Attendance: 2,427; Referee: Mohammad Zamzaidi bin Katimin; Man of the Match: Taiki Kagayama (Sabah)

23 July 2022 Quarter Finals	Sabah	0–2	Selangor	Kota Kinabalu
19:30 MYT	Rawilson (yellow card) 62'; Park (yellow card) 84'	Report	Hyuri 1'; Fazly Mazlan (yellow card) 45+1'; Caion 81'	Stadium: Likas Stadium; Attendance: 19,410; Referee: Suhaizi Shukri; Man of the Match: Sharul Nazeem (Selangor)

=== Malaysia Cup ===
==== Fixtures and Results ====
Win Draw Loss

26 October 2022 Round of 16 (Leg 1)	UiTM FC	1–2	Sabah	Shah Alam
20:15 MYT	Afzal (yellow card) 52'; Farez Aiman (yellow card) 65'; Attram 90+1'	Report	Baddrol 44'; Rawilson (yellow card) 49'; Maxsius 70'	Stadium: UiTM Stadium; Attendance: 1,429; Referee: Muhammad Khairulsyahmi bin Ahmad Khalidi; Man of the Match: Baddrol Bakhtiar (Sabah)

31 October 2022 Round of 16 (Leg 2)	Sabah	1–1	UiTM FC	Kota Kinabalu
20:15 MYT	Rawilson (yellow card) 62'; Farhan Roslan 66' (pen.)	Report	Afzal (yellow card) 83'; Farez Aiman 90+2'}	Stadium: Likas Stadium; Attendance: 5,025; Referee: Abang Azharudin Abdullah; Man of the Match: Robson Rendy Rining (UiTM)

6 November 2022 Quarter Final (Leg 1)	Kuching City	0–1	Sabah	Kuching
21:00 MYT	Adam (yellow card) 89'	Report	Rizal (yellow card) 4'; Baddrol 69'; Irfan (yellow card) 80'	Stadium: Sarawak State Stadium; Attendance: 20,154; Referee: S. Logeswaran; Man of the Match: Damien Lim (Sabah)

11 November 2022 Quarter Final (Leg 2)	Sabah	1–1 (a.e.t.)	Kuching City	Kota Kinabalu
21:00 MYT	Irfan (yellow card) 27'; Alto (yellow card) 76'; Kagayama 94'; Hanafie (yellow card) 102'	Report	Bacok 83' (o.g.); Alif (yellow card) 93'	Stadium: Likas Stadium; Attendance: 6,313; Referee: Mohammad Zamzaidi bin Katimin; Man of the Match: Taiki Kagayama (Sabah)

15 November 2022 Semi Final (Leg 1)	Sabah	0–1	Johor Darul Ta'zim	Kota Kinabalu
20:15 MYT	Badrul (yellow card) 19'; Farhan (yellow card) 21'; Amri (yellow card) 57'; Gerald Gadit (yellow card) 62'; Dominic (yellow card) 66'; Hanafie (yellow card) 84'	Report	Arif Aiman 34'; Arif Aiman (yellow card) 43'; Bergson (yellow card) 47'; Feroz (yellow card) 53' (yellow-red card) 73'; Velazquez (yellow card) 82'	Stadium: Likas Stadium; Attendance: 14,000; Referee: Razlan bin Joffri Ali; Man of the Match: Damien Lim (Sabah)

20 November 2022 Semi Final (Leg 2)	Johor Darul Ta'zim	3–1	Sabah	Iskandar Puteri
20:15 MYT	Taiki Kagayama 47'; Gerald Gadit (yellow card) 16' (yellow-red card) 90+4'	Report	Bergson 35'; Forestieri 41'; Nazmi (yellow card) 54'; Syafiq 41'	Stadium: Sultan Ibrahim Stadium; Attendance: 33,445; Referee: Muhammad Nazmi bin Nasaruddin; Man of the Match: Afiq Fazail (Johor Darul Ta'zim)

== Statistics ==
=== Squad statistics ===
No.	Pos.	Player	Super League						FA Cup						Malaysia Cup						Total					
No.	Pos.	Player	Apps.	Starts	Goals	Booked	Second yellow card	Sent off (straight red)	Apps.	Starts	Goals	Booked	Second yellow card	Sent off (straight red)	Apps.	Starts	Goals	Booked	Second yellow card	Sent off (straight red)	Apps.	Starts	Goals	Booked	Second yellow card	Sent off (straight red)
1	GK	(Malaysia) Ramzi Mustakim																								
2	DF	(Malaysia) Abdul Hanafie Tokyo	6	3					1						4			2			11	3		2		
3	DF	(Malaysia) Rawilson Batuil	19	13		2		1	3	3		2			5	5		2			27	21		6		1
4	DF	(Brazil) Jackson de Souza	16	16	2	2			1	1											17	17	2	2		
5	DF	(Malaysia) Gerald Gadit	5	1					1						2	2		2	1		8	3		2	1	
6	DF	(South Korea) Park Tae-Soo	19	19	8	6			3	3		1			3	3					25	25	8	7		
7	MF	(Malaysia) Baddrol Bakhtiar	20	19	6	1			2	2					5	5	2				27	26	8	1		
8	MF	(Malaysia) Tommy Mawat Bada	10	8		2			1			1									11	8		3		
9	FW	(Malaysia) Farhan Roslan	11	3	1	1			1						6	6	1	1			18	9	2	2		
10	FW	(Japan) Taiki Kagayama	22	21	2				2	2	1				6	6	2				30	29	5			
11	MF	(Malaysia) Alto Linus	8	8		1			1	1					1	1		1			10	10		2		
12	FW	(Malaysia) Thanabalan Nadarajah	3	2		1			1	1					2						6	3		1		
13	DF	(Malaysia) Badrul Afendy Fadzli	2						1	1					4	2		1			7	3		1		
15	DF	(Malaysia) Rizal Ghazali	18	17		5	1		1	1					5	5		1			24	23		6	1	
17	FW	(Malaysia) Amri Yahyah	18	6	5	3			3	3					6	1		1			27	10	5	4		
19	GK	(Malaysia) Khairul Fahmi Che Mat	22	22		1															22	22		1		
20	MF	(Malaysia) Gary Steven Robbat	15	11		4			2	1											17	12		4		
21	DF	(Malaysia) Nazirul Naim	15	8					3	1	1				3	3					21	12	1			
22	MF	(Malaysia) Stuart Wilkin	18	14	2	1			3	3					4	4					25	21	2	1		
27	FW	(Malaysia) Dirga Surdi													1						1					
29	MF	(Malaysia) Ummareng Bacok	8	2		1			1	1	1	1			3						12	3	1	2		
31	GK	(Malaysia) Damien Lim	2						3	3					6	6					11	9				
33	DF	(Malaysia) Dominic Tan	21	19	2	1			2	2					6	6		1			29	27	2	2		
67	FW	(Indonesia) Saddil Ramdani	17	17	4	2			3	1	1	1			3	2					23	20	5	3		
69	FW	(Malaysia) Sahrizan Saidin	2						1	1					1	1					4	2				
70	FW	(Guinea-Bissau) José Embaló	7	6	1	1			1												8	6	1	1		
77	MF	(Malaysia) Irfan Fazail	14	2	1	1			2	1					4	4		2			20	7	1	3		
80	FW	(Malaysia) Azhad Harraz	11			1			1						5	3					17	3		1		
88	FW	(Malaysia) Maxsius Musa	3						1	1					5	1	1				9	2	1			
9	FW	(Brazil) Neto Pessoa	6	5	2				1												7	5	2			
TOTALS					3	3	1	1			4	6	0	0			6	14	1	0			46	57	2	1

Last updated: 20 November 2022
Source: FAM

=== Goals ===
As of 20 November 2022

Rank	Player	Super League	FA Cup	Malaysia Cup	Total
1	(Malaysia) Baddrol Bakhtiar	6	0	2	8
1	(South Korea) Park Tae-Soo	8	0	0	8
3	(Malaysia) Amri Yahyah	5	0	0	5
3	(Indonesia) Saddil Ramdani	4	1	0	5
3	(Japan) Taiki Kagayama	2	1	2	5
6	(Malaysia) Farhan Roslan	1	0	1	2
6	(Brazil) Jackson de Souza	2	0	0	2
6	(Brazil) Neto Pessoa	2	0	0	2
6	(Malaysia) Stuart Wilkin	2	0	0	2
6	(Malaysia) Dominic Tan	2	0	0	2
11	(Malaysia) Irfan Fazail	1	0	0	1
11	(Guinea-Bissau) José Embaló	1	0	0	1
11	(Malaysia) Maxsius Musa	0	0	1	1
11	(Malaysia) Nazirul Naim	0	1	0	1
11	(Malaysia) Ummareng Bacok	0	1	0	1
Total		36	4	6	46

=== Clean sheets ===
As of 20 November 2022

Rank	Player	Super League	FA Cup	Malaysia Cup	Total
1	(Malaysia) Khairul Fahmi Che Mat	5	0	0	5
2	(Malaysia) Damien Lim	0	1	1	2
Total		5	1	0	6
