= 2021 UiTM FC season =

UiTM FC
2021 season
- President: Mohd. Sazili Shahibi
- CEO: Mustaza Ahmad
- Head coach: Frank Bernhardt; Reduan Abdullah (caretaker)
- Stadium: UiTM Stadium
- Malaysia Super League: 12th ▼ (relegated)
- Malaysia Cup: DNQ
- Top goalscorer: League: Kwon Yong-hyun (4); All: Kwon Yong-hyun (4)
- Highest home attendance: 0
- Lowest home attendance: 0
- Average home league attendance: 0

The 2021 season was UiTM FC's second competitive season in the highest tier of Malaysian football after got promoted from 2019 Malaysia Premier League.

== Players ==
As of 16 January 2021

Note: Flags indicate national team as defined under FIFA eligibility rules; some limited exceptions apply. Players may hold more than one non-FIFA nationality.

No.	Pos.	Nation	Player
1	GK	MAS	Azam Jais
4	DF	MAS	Farid Nezal
5	MF	MAS	Hardee Shamsuri
7	FW	MAS	Rafie Yaacob
8	MF	MAS	Nazirul Hasif
9	MF	MAS	Fahmi Sabri
10	FW	KOR	Kwon Yong-hyun
11	FW	MAS	Khairul Rizam
12	DF	MAS	Afif Asyraf (vice-captain)
13	DF	MAS	Asraff Hayqal
15	DF	MAS	Aliff Najmi
16	MF	MAS	Shafiq Al-Hafiz
17	MF	MAS	Dirga Surdi
19	MF	MAS	Sean Giannelli (on loan from Kuala Lumpur City)
20	FW	MAS	Khairul Asyraf
21	DF	MAS	Faizal Arif
23	DF	MAS	Nashran Elias

No.	Pos.	Nation	Player
24	GK	MAS	Azfar Arif
26	GK	MAS	Alfaiz Zula'amin
27	FW	MAS	Khairul Izuan
28	DF	MAS	Ariff Ar-Rasyid
29	DF	MAS	Fauzi Latif
34	MF	MAS	Amirul Aiman
35	DF	MAS	Syahmi Shukri
37	FW	MAS	Hausen Shwahiri
44	DF	MAS	Arham Khussyairi
68	DF	MAS	Khuzaimi Piee
69	MF	MAS	Alif Samsudin
75	MF	FRA	Ousmane Fane
89	GK	MAS	Zamir Selamat (on loan from Kuala Lumpur City)
93	FW	THA	Dennis Buschening
94	FW	BRA	Joel Vinicius
95	DF	MAS	Hisyamudin Sha'ari
99	DF	FRA	Victor Nirennold (captain)

== Transfers ==
=== First leg ===
In: Note: Flags indicate national team as defined under FIFA eligibility rules; some limited exceptions apply. Players may hold more than one non-FIFA nationality.

No.	Pos.	Nation	Player
4	DF	MAS	Farid Nezal (from Police)
5	MF	MAS	Hardee Shamsuri (from Sri Pahang)
10	FW	LBN	Abou Bakr Al-Mel (from (Lebanon) Bourj)
11	FW	MAS	Khairul Rizam (from Kelantan)
15	DF	MAS	Aliff Najmi (from Perak II)
17	MF	MAS	Dirga Surdi (from Police)

No.	Pos.	Nation	Player
20	FW	MAS	Khairul Asyraf (from Perak II)
27	FW	MAS	Khairul Izuan (from Kelantan United)
29	DF	MAS	Fauzi Latif (from Negeri Sembilan)
30	FW	GHA	Nana Poku (from (Qatar) Al-Markhiya)
37	MF	PHI	Adam Reed (from Sri Pahang)
92	GK	CRO	Dominik Picak (from (Germany) SV Babelsberg 03)

Out: Note: Flags indicate national team as defined under FIFA eligibility rules; some limited exceptions apply. Players may hold more than one non-FIFA nationality.

No.	Pos.	Nation	Player
8	MF	MAS	Fariduddin Zainal
10	FW	BRA	Gustavo (to (Japan) Kagoshima United)
15	DF	MAS	Danish Haziq (to Perak)
17	FW	MAS	Arif Anwar (to Terengganu)
18	MF	MAS	Shahrul Igwan (to Police)

No.	Pos.	Nation	Player
20	GK	MAS	Haziq Aris (to Sarawak United)
25	FW	PHI	Mark Hartmann (to (Philippines) United)
30	FW	LBN	Rabih Ataya (loan return to (Lebanon) Ahed)
75	MF	FRA	Ousmane Fané (to (Indonesia) Persiraja)

=== Second leg ===
In: Note: Flags indicate national team as defined under FIFA eligibility rules; some limited exceptions apply. Players may hold more than one non-FIFA nationality.

No.	Pos.	Nation	Player
10	FW	KOR	Kwon Yong-hyun (from (South Korea) Busan IPark)
18	FW	TLS	João Pedro (loan from Kuala Kangsar)
19	MF	MAS	Sean Giannelli (loan from Kuala Lumpur City)
35	DF	MAS	Syahmi Shukri (from Kelantan United)
69	MF	MAS	Alif Samsudin

No.	Pos.	Nation	Player
75	MF	FRA	Ousmane Fane
89	GK	MAS	Zamir Selamat (loan from Kuala Lumpur City)
93	FW	THA	Dennis Buschening (from Sabah)
94	FW	BRA	Joel Vinicius (from (Brazil) Juventus)
95	DF	MAS	Hisyamudin Sha'ari

Out: Note: Flags indicate national team as defined under FIFA eligibility rules; some limited exceptions apply. Players may hold more than one non-FIFA nationality.

No.	Pos.	Nation	Player
10	FW	LBN	Abou Bakr Al-Mel (to (Lebanon) Bourj)
19	MF	MAS	Saiful Iskandar (to Selangor)
30	FW	GHA	Nana Poku (to Perak)

No.	Pos.	Nation	Player
37	MF	PHI	Adam Reed (to (Philippines) United)
39	MF	MAS	Nizarruddin Jazi
92	GK	CRO	Dominik Picak

== Statistics ==
=== Appearances and goals ===
Players with no appearances not included in the list.

As of 12 September 2021

No.	Pos.	Nat.	Name	League		Total	
No.	Pos.	Nat.	Name	Apps	Goals	Apps	Goals
4	DF	(Malaysia)	Farid Nezal	9(4)	0	13	0
5	MF	(Malaysia)	Hardee Shamsuri	1(3)	0	4	0
7	FW	(Malaysia)	Rafie Yaacob	13(8)	0	21	0
8	MF	(Malaysia)	Nazirul Hasif	3(1)	0	4	0
9	MF	(Malaysia)	Fahmi Sabri	1(8)	0	9	0
10	FW	(South Korea)	Kwon Yong-hyun	9	4	9	4
11	FW	(Malaysia)	Khairul Rizam	1(5)	0	6	0
12	DF	(Malaysia)	Afif Asyraf	18	0	18	0
13	MF	(Malaysia)	Asraff Hayqal	0(3)	0	3	0
15	DF	(Malaysia)	Aliff Najmi	8(2)	0	10	0
16	MF	(Malaysia)	Shafiq Al-Hafiz	12(8)	1	20	1
17	FW	(Malaysia)	Dirga Surdi	9(9)	0	18	0
19	FW	(Malaysia)	Sean Giannelli	9	3	9	3
20	FW	(Malaysia)	Khairul Asyraf	0(1)	0	1	0
21	DF	(Malaysia)	Faizal Arif	18(1)	0	19	0
23	DF	(Malaysia)	Nashran Elias	1(8)	0	9	0
24	GK	(Malaysia)	Azfar Arif	8(1)	0	9	0
27	MF	(Malaysia)	Khairul Izuan	12(5)	0	17	0
28	DF	(Malaysia)	Ariff Ar-Rasyid	8(5)	1	13	1
29	FW	(Malaysia)	Fauzi Latif	2(10)	1	12	1
34	MF	(Malaysia)	Amirul Aiman	0(8)	0	8	0
35	DF	(Malaysia)	Syahmi Shukri	1	0	1	0
37	FW	(Malaysia)	Hausen Shwahiri	0(1)	0	1	0
68	DF	(Malaysia)	Khuzaimi Piee	14(1)	0	15	0
69	MF	(Malaysia)	Alif Samsudin	5(2)	0	7	0
75	MF	(France)	Ousmane Fané	11	0	11	0
89	MF	(Malaysia)	Zamir Selamat	9	0	9	0
93	FW	(Thailand)	Dennis Buschening	4(1)	1	5	1
94	FW	(Brazil)	Joel Vinicius	8	2	8	2
95	DF	(Malaysia)	Hisyamudin Sha'ari	2(2)	0	4	0
99	DF	(France)	Victor Nirennold	20	1	20	1
Players no longer at the club
10	FW	(Lebanon)	Abou Bakr Al-Mel	7(2)	0	9	0
18	FW	(Timor-Leste)	João Pedro	2	0	2	0
30	FW	(Ghana)	Nana Poku	9	2	9	2
37	MF	(Philippines)	Adam Reed	2	0	2	0
95	GK	(Croatia)	Dominik Picak	5	0	5	0

== Competitions ==
=== Malaysia Super League ===
==== League table ====
Pos	Team	Pld	W	D	L	GF	GA	GD	Pts	Qualification or relegation
8	Melaka United	22	5	9	8	25	31	−6	21 (Note: Melaka have been docked three points based on the following of the decision from FAM (Football Association of Malaysia).)	
9	Sabah	22	4	7	11	21	38	−17	19	
10	Sri Pahang	22	4	6	12	23	37	−14	18	
11	Perak (R)	22	4	4	14	20	45	−25	16	Relegation to Malaysia Premier League
12	UiTM (R)	22	3	4	15	16	41	−25	13	Relegation to Malaysia Premier League

Source: Malaysian Football League
Rules for classification: 1) Points; 2) Goal difference; 3) Number of goals scored.
(R) Relegated

==== Matches ====
Win Draw Loss Fixtures

6 March 2021 1	UiTM	1–2	Terengganu
MYT (UTC+8)

10 March 2021 2	Kuala Lumpur City	1–0	UiTM
MYT (UTC+8)

13 March 2021 3	UiTM	0–4	Johor Darul Ta'zim
MYT (UTC+8)

16 March 2021 4	Penang	0–0	UiTM
MYT (UTC+8)

20 March 2021 5	UiTM	0–1	Kedah Darul Aman
MYT (UTC+8)

3 April 2021 6	UiTM	0–2	Selangor
MYT (UTC+8)

7 April 2021 7	Perak	3–2	UiTM
MYT (UTC+8)

10 April 2021 8	UiTM	0–3	Melaka United
MYT (UTC+8)

17 April 2021 9	Sabah	4–0	UiTM
MYT (UTC+8)

24 April 2021 10	UiTM	0–1	Petaling Jaya City
MYT (UTC+8)

1 May 2021 11	Sri Pahang	5–0	UiTM
MYT (UTC+8)

4 May 2021 12	Terengganu	3–0	UiTM
MYT (UTC+8)

8 May 2021 13	UiTM	1–1	Kuala Lumpur City
MYT (UTC+8)

25 July 2021 14	Johor Darul Ta'zim	3–1	UiTM
MYT (UTC+8)

28 July 2021 15	UiTM	0–1	Penang
MYT (UTC+8)

3 August 2021 16	Selangor	2–0	UiTM
MYT (UTC+8)

7 August 2021 17	UiTM	2–0	Perak
MYT (UTC+8)

22 August 2021 18	Melaka United	1–1	UiTM
MYT (UTC+8)

28 August 2021 19	UiTM	4–0	Sabah
MYT (UTC+8)

4 September 2021 20	Petaling Jaya City	1–0	UiTM
MYT (UTC+8)

8 September 2021 21	Kedah Darul Aman	3–3	UiTM
MYT (UTC+8)

12 September 2021 22	UiTM	1–0	Sri Pahang
MYT (UTC+8)
