= Dennis Buschening =

German footballer

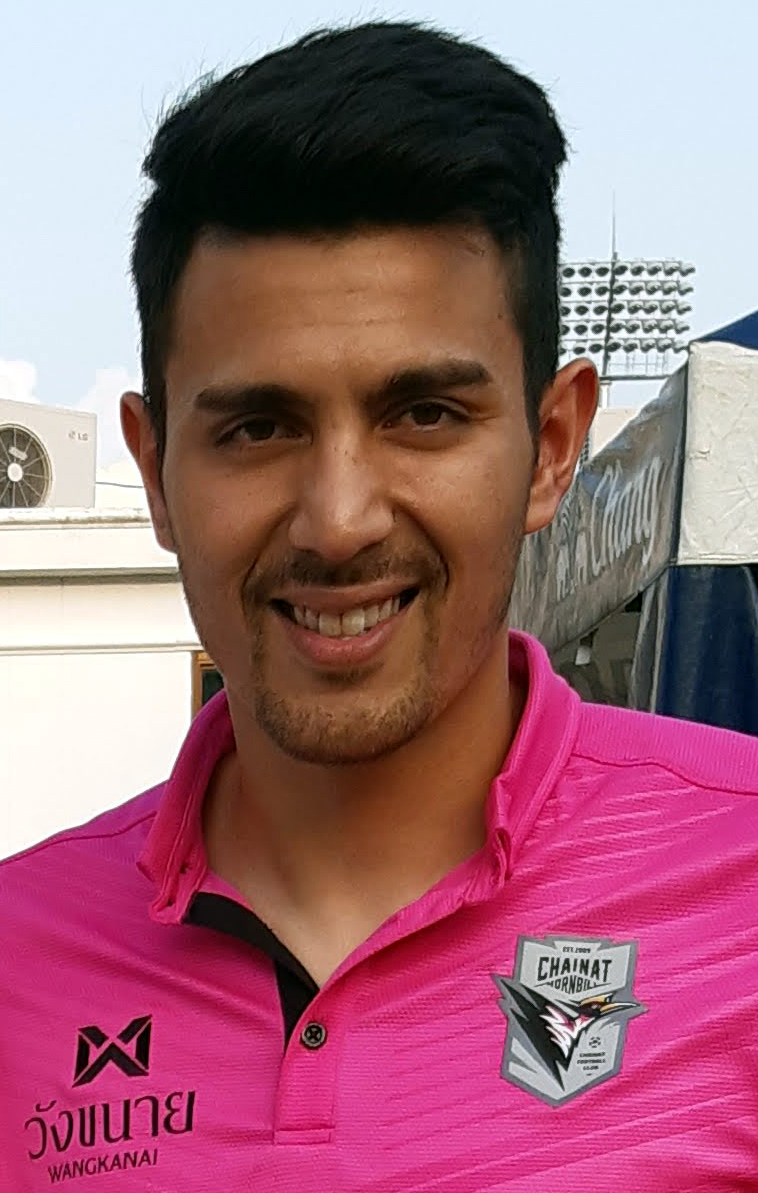
- Buschening in 2019

Personal information
- Date of birth: 2 March 1991 (age 35)
- Place of birth: Esslingen am Neckar, Germany
- Height: 1.83 m (6 ft 0 in)
- Position: Forward

Youth career
- 2007–2008: Borussia Dortmund
- 2008–2009: Rot-Weiss Essen

Senior career*
Years	Team	Apps	(Gls)
2010–2011	Westfalia Rhynern	33	(15)
2011–2012	SC Verl	13	(0)
2012–2013	Hammer SpVg	14	(0)
2013–2014	Buriram United	0	(0)
2013	→ Police Tero (loan)	6	(1)
2014	Army United	4	(0)
2015–2016	Siam Navy	16	(2)
2017	Angthong	22	(3)
2018	Westfalia Rhynern	12	(0)
2018–2019	SpVgg Beckum	11	(2)
2019	Chainat Hornbill	9	(0)
2020	Sabah	7	(4)
2021	UiTM United	5	(1)
2022	Kedah Darul Aman	2	(1)
2023	MH Nakhon Si City	4	(0)
2023–2024	Kelantan	2	(1)
- * Club domestic league appearances and goals as of 21 May 2023

Dennis Buschening (Thai: เดนนิส บุสเชนิ่ง; born 2 March 1991) is a German-Thai former professional footballer who plays as a forward.

== Club career ==
Buschening learned to play football in the youth departments of Eintracht Frankfurt, Borussia Dortmund and Rot-Weiss Essen. He signed his first contract with Westfalia Rhynern, a club that played in the NRW-Liga. After 33 games, he moved to SC Verl in the Regionalliga in 2011 and then, from 2012 to 2013, to Hammer SpVg in Oberliga Westfalen.

In 2013 he left Germany and moved to Thailand. Here he signed a contract with the first division side Buriram United from Buriram. After six months he was loaned to league rivals Police Tero Sasana to Bangkok. After the end of his contract with Buriram, he joined Army United in 2014, a club that also played in the first division, the Thai League 1, and is based in Bangkok. He played four times for the Army. In 2015 he moved to Sattahip for the then first division team Navy. In 2017 he switched to the second division, the Thai League 2, where he joined Angthong.

He returned to Germany in 2018 where he played again for Westfalia Rhynern. In the same year he joined the SpVgg Beckum, a club that played in the Oberliga Westfalen.

For the back series in 2019 he went back to Thailand. Here he signed a contract in Chai Nat with Premier League club Chainat Hornbill. After Chainat's relegation to the second division, he left the club and moved to Malaysia.

Here he signed a contract with Sabah. The club from Sabah became champions of the second division, the Malaysia Premier League, in 2019. In 2020 the club played in the first division, the Malaysia Super League. He was under contract with the club until the beginning of May 2021. He then moved to Shah Alam for league rivals UiTM United.

== Personal life ==
Buschening was born in Esslingen am Neckar to a Thai mother and German father.

== Career statistics ==
=== Club ===
As of 9 March 2022

Appearances and goals by club, season and competition
Club	Season	League			National cup		League cup		Continental		Total	
Club	Season	Division	Apps	Goals	Apps	Goals	Apps	Goals	Apps	Goals	Apps	Goals
Buriram United	2013	Thai Premier League	0	0	0	0	2	3	2	0	4	3
Police Tero (loan)	2013	Thai Premier League	6	1	0	0	0	0	—		6	1
Army United	2014	Thai Premier League	4	0	0	0	0	0	—		4	0
Navy	2014	Thai Premier League	9	2	—		—		—		9	2
Sabah	2020	Malaysia Super League	7	4	0	0	0	0	–		7	4
UiTM United	2021	Malaysia Super League	5	1	0	0	0	0	–		5	1
Kedah Darul Aman	2022	Malaysia Super League	2	1	0	0	0	0	0	0	2	1
Career total			33	9	0	0	2	3	2	0	37	12
