= Aguinaldo (footballer) =

Angolan footballer (born 1989)

Personal information
- Full name: Aguinaldo Policarpo Mendes da Veiga
- Date of birth: March 25, 1989 (age 37)
- Place of birth: Luanda, Angola
- Height: 1.86 m (6 ft 1 in)
- Position: Forward

Team information
- Current team: Al-Najma
- Number: 16

Youth career
- 2004–2005: Sporting da Torre
- 2005–2007: Alta de Lisboa
- 2007–2008: Académica de Coimbra

Senior career*
Years	Team	Apps	(Gls)
2008–2010	Tourizense	50	(9)
2010	Tondela	14	(2)
2011–2013	Recreativo do Libolo	40	(25)
2012	→ AE Paphos (loan)	13	(5)
2013–2015	CA Bizertin	12	(4)
2014–2015	→ Al-Mesaimeer SC (loan)	15	(7)
2015	Interclube	4	(0)
2016	Doxa Katokopias	14	(5)
2016	AEL Limassol	2	(0)
2017	Gil Vicente	10	(1)
2017–2018	Eléctrico	4	(1)
2018	Ubon UMT United	17	(2)
2018–2019	Politehnica Iași	4	(1)
2019	Sabah	14	(5)
2020	Real SC	1	(0)
2021	Metaloglobus București	11	(4)
2021–	Al-Najma	20	(12)

International career^{‡}
2011–2012	Angola	3	(0)
- * Club domestic league appearances and goals as of 8 May 2021 ‡ National team caps and goals as of 07:52, 23 August 2021 (UTC)

Aguinaldo Policarpo Mendes da Veiga (born 25 March 1989), simply known as Aguinaldo, is an Angolan-Portuguese professional footballer who plays as a forward for Bahraini Premier League club Al-Najma SC and the Angola national football team. Aguinaldo has played for thirteen clubs in three continents and seven countries.

== Club career ==
=== Bizertin ===
Tunisian championship competitors CA Bizertin gave Aguinaldo a two-season long contract back in 2013.

Surprised by rumors circulating that he allegedly received some money from G.D. Interclube prior to leaving for Tunisia in 2014, the athlete denied such claims, stating that he had given it all back and that there is nothing they can do because he is not an Interclube player. He became a free agent when his contract with Recreativo do Libolo expired, before going to Tunisia.

=== Doxa Katokopias ===
In January 2016, Aguinaldo joined Greek club Doxa Katokopias FC. He later chose the number 89 jersey.

=== Sabah ===
On 15 May 2019, Aguinaldo signed by Malaysian Premier League club Sabah FA as one of two imports to fill their vacant player slots. Aguinaldo scored the winning goal for Sabah to seal their first place in the 2019 Malaysia Premier League table during the match against UiTM F.C. since the team last lifted the old first division title back in 1996, subsequently making the team able to qualify to the 2020 Malaysia Super League.

== Honours ==
Recreativo do Libolo

- Girabola: 2011

Sabah

- Liga Premier Malaysia: 2019
