= Luka Milunović =

Serbian footballer (born 1992)

Personal information
- Date of birth: 21 December 1992 (age 33)
- Place of birth: Belgrade, FR Yugoslavia
- Height: 1.80 m (5 ft 11 in)
- Position: Forward

Team information
- Current team: Smederevo 1924
- Number: 40

Youth career
- Zvezdara
- OFK Beograd

Senior career*
Years	Team	Apps	(Gls)
2010–2011	OFK Beograd	1	(0)
2011–2012	Zulte Waregem	12	(0)
2012–2014	Red Star Belgrade	46	(10)
2014–2016	Platanias	47	(9)
2016–2018	Aris	34	(5)
2018	Voždovac	11	(0)
2019	Melaka United	11	(7)
2019	→ Sabah FA (loan)	10	(3)
2020	Debrecen	8	(0)
2020–2021	Napredak Kruševac	25	(5)
2021–2022	Kukësi	34	(7)
2022	Niki Volos	9	(2)
2023	Radnički 1923	16	(3)
2023–2024	Perak	20	(6)
2025	Voždovac	11	(0)
2025	Dubočica	13	(1)
2026	Kavala	5	(1)
2026–	Smederevo 1924	0	(0)

International career
2011–2015	Serbia U21	16	(5)
- * Club domestic league appearances and goals as of 20 June 2026

Luka Milunović (Serbian Cyrillic: Лука Милуновић; born 21 December 1992) is a Serbian professional footballer who plays as a forward for Smederevo 1924.

== Club career ==
=== Early career ===
Premature going abroad, he made earlier this player gaming mature. He was a member of the Serbian youth national team. He joined the OFK Beograd senior team in the 2010–11 season but made only one league appearance that season.

=== Zulte Waregem ===
In summer of 2011 he signed with Belgian Pro League team SV Zulte Waregem. He made 12 league appearances in the first half of 2011–12 season.

=== Red Star Belgrade ===
After only 6 months in Belgium, he returned to Serbia to play for Red Star Belgrade. On 21 March 2012, he scored a goal against Red Star's archrivals Partizan in the Eternal derby.

=== Aris ===
After 2 years with Platanias, he was released in July 2016. Despite some speculation linking him with AEK Athens and PAOK he decided to join Aris on a three-year deal. On 25 October 2016 he made his debut in an away Cup win against Aiginiakos, scoring two goals and giving one assist. On 10 December 2017 he scored his first league goal in an easy 3–1 away win against Panelefsiniakos. On 8 January he scored the winner in a 2–1 home win against Panegialios. Ten days later he sealed a 4–0 home win against Panserraikos. On 28 January 2017 he scored the only goal in a home derby win against OFI. On 31 August 2018, he terminated his contract by mutual consent.

=== Sabah FA ===
In 2019 season of Malaysian Premier League, he sign with Sabah FA on 1-year contract. He joined another Serbia Rodoljub Paunović and South Korean defender Park Tae-soo as a foreign player at the club.

== International career ==
On 5 September 2013, Milunović scored two goals against Cyprus U21 playing for Serbia U21 in the 2015 UEFA European Under-21 Championship qualification. Just a month later on 15 October 2013, he continued his good form in the same tournament scoring a goal against Northern Ireland U21.

== Career statistics ==
As of 12 March 2018

Club performance			League		Cup		Continental		Total	
Season	Club	League	Apps	Goals	Apps	Goals	Apps	Goals	Apps	Goals
Serbia			League		Serbian Cup		Europe		Total	
2010–11	OFK Beograd	Serbian SuperLiga	1	0	0	0	1	0	2	0
Belgium			League		Belgian Cup		Europe		Total	
2011–12	Zulte Waregem	Belgian Pro League	12	0	1	0	0	0	13	0
Serbia			League		Serbian Cup		Europe		Total	
2011–12	Red Star	Serbian SuperLiga	11	4	3	1	0	0	14	5
2012–13	Red Star	Serbian SuperLiga	27	6	2	1	6	2	35	9
2013–14	Red Star	Serbian SuperLiga	8	0	2	0	2	0	12	0
Greece			League		Greek Cup		Europe		Total	
2014–15	Platanias	Super League Greece	23	3	1	1	0	0	24	4
2015–16	Platanias	Super League Greece	24	6	0	0	0	0	24	6
2016–17	Aris	Football League	25	4	4	2	0	0	29	6
2017–18	Aris	Football League	9	1	2	1	0	0	11	2
			League		Cup		Continental		Total	
Total	Serbia		47	10	7	2	9	2	63	14
Total	Belgium		12	0	1	0	0	0	13	0
Total	Greece		81	14	7	4	0	0	88	17
Career total			140	24	15	6	9	2	164	31

== Honours ==
Red Star

- Serbian SuperLiga: 2013–14
- Serbian Cup: 2011–12
