= Bernard Agele =

South Sudanese footballer (born 1992)

Personal information
- Full name: Timateo Benard Agele Michael
- Date of birth: 4 December 1992 (age 33)
- Place of birth: Arua, Uganda
- Position: Centre-back

Senior career*
Years	Team	Apps	(Gls)
2009–2010	Villa	17	(1)
2010–2011	Kampala City	16	(1)
2011–2012	Express	23	(2)
2012–2015	Victoria University	51	(4)
2015	KCB	29	(3)
2016–2017	Villa	17	(0)
2017–2018	Express	21	(1)
2019	UiTM	19	(0)
2020	Kota Ranger	1	(0)
2022	Villa	7	(0)

International career^{‡}
2014–	South Sudan	15	(0)
- * Club domestic league appearances and goals as of 1 May 2023 ‡ National team caps and goals as of 17 December 2019

Timateo Benard Agele Michael (born 4 December 1992) is a South Sudanese international footballer who last played for SC Villa as a defender.

== Club career ==
Agele has played for various clubs such as Villa Uganda, Kampala City, Express, Victoria University, KCB in Kenya, UiTM in Malaysia and Kota Ranger in Brunei.

In January 2019, Agele joined UiTM F.C. on a 10-month contract.

The following year, Agele signed for Kota Ranger FC, a club based in Brunei, but managed to play only once before the league was cancelled. He returned to SC Villa in early 2022 and played there until his release that September.

== International career ==
Agele made his debut for South Sudan national team on 23 November 2015 against Djibouti during the CECAFA 2015 Tournament. South Sudan national team won 2–0.

South Sudan national team
Year	Apps	Goals
2015	5	0
2016	8	0
2019	2	0
Total	15	0

Statistics accurate as of match played 17 November 2019

== Honors ==
=== Express ===
- Ugandan Super League: 1

2012

=== Victoria University ===
- Ugandan Cup winner: 2013
- Ugandan Super Cup runner-up: 2013
