= Kwon Yong-hyun =

South Korean footballer

Kwon Yong-Hyun
Personal information
- Date of birth: 23 October 1991 (age 35)
- Place of birth: South Korea
- Height: 1.70 m (5 ft 7 in)
- Position: Winger

Team information
- Current team: UiTM
- Number: 10

Youth career
- Howon University

Senior career*
Years	Team	Apps	(Gls)
2012	Cheonan City	23	(6)
2013–2015	Suwon FC	87	(13)
2016–	Jeju United	5	(0)
2016–2017	→ Suwon FC (loan)	16	(5)
2017–2018	Gyeongnam FC	20	(2)
2018	Suwon FC	12	(0)
2019–2020	Busan IPark	34	(2)
2020	→ FC Anyang (loan)	18	(3)
2021–	UiTM	2	(1)
- * Club domestic league appearances and goals as of 28 May 2021

Kwon Yong-Hyun (Korean: 권용현; born 23 October 1991) is a South Korean footballer who plays as midfielder for Malaysia Super League club UiTM.

== Career ==
He was selected by Suwon FC in 2013 K League Draft.

In 2021, he also joined UiTM FC in Malaysia
