= Azzizan Nordin =

Malaysian professional footballer

Personal information
- Full name: Muhammad Azzizan Bin Nordin
- Date of birth: 3 July 1994 (age 32)
- Place of birth: Bongawan, Sabah, Malaysia
- Height: 1.70 m (5 ft 7 in)
- Position: Midfielder

Team information
- Current team: Machan

Youth career
- 2014: Sabah U-21

Senior career*
Years	Team	Apps	(Gls)
2011	Harimau Muda B	1	(0)
2012	Harimau Muda	12	(0)
2013	Harimau Muda B	20	(0)
2014–2021	Sabah	107	(3)
2022	Penang	17	(0)
2023–	Machan		

International career^{‡}
2018	Malaysia	2	(0)
- * Club domestic league appearances and goals as of 5 August 2023 ‡ National team caps and goals as of 5 October 2019

Muhammad Azzizan bin Nordin (born 3 July 1994) is a Malaysian professional footballer who plays as a midfielder for Malaysia M4 League club Machan.

== Club career ==
Azzizan start his professional career with Harimau Muda squad that playing in Malaysia Premier League. He later spent two season playing in the Singapore's S-League with Harimau Muda. After the disband of Harimau Muda, he signed a contract with Sabah for 2014 seasons and played in the President's Cup with Sabah U-21.

He made his debut for Sabah senior side in the opening match of 2015 Malaysia Premier League against Kuala Lumpur at the Merdeka Stadium where Sabah won 2-0. Since then, he was a regular for Sabah and appointed as the vice captain besides Rawilson Batuil. He won the Malaysia Premier League title with Sabah in 2019.

== International career ==
Azzizan received his first national called up in 2018 by Tan Cheng Hoe for friendly match against Chinese Taipei and Cambodia. He made his debut on 10 September 2018 in the match against Cambodia where he came in as substitute in the 1st half replacing Nasir Basharudin.

== Honours ==
Sabah

- Malaysia Premier League: 2019
