= Rawilson Batuil =

Malaysian footballer

Personal information
- Full name: Rawilson Batuil
- Date of birth: 29 April 1994 (age 32)
- Place of birth: Kota Marudu, Sabah, Malaysia
- Height: 1.75 m (5 ft 9 in)
- Position: Centre-back

Team information
- Current team: Sabah
- Number: 3

Youth career
- 2014: Sabah U-21

Senior career*
Years	Team	Apps	(Gls)
2014–	Sabah	159	(5)

International career^{‡}
2018	Malaysia	1	(0)
- * Club domestic league appearances and goals as of 3 December 2023 ‡ National team caps and goals as of 3 December 2023

Rawilson Batuil (born 29 April 1994), also known as Jipun, is a Malaysian professional footballer who plays as a defender for Malaysia Super League club Sabah.

== Club career ==
Rawilson, who hails from Kota Marudu, was roped into the senior Sabah side in 2014 from the Under-21 side. He was named as captain of the senior side in 2017 season when Jelius Ating took over as Sabah head coach.

A one-club man, Rawilson made his 200th appearances for Sabah on 30 November 2023 against Hougang United in 2023-24 AFC Cup match. He made 61 Malaysia Super League appearances, 97 Malaysia Premier League match, 14 Malaysia FA Cup match, 26 Malaysia Cup match, and 2 times appearances in AFC Cup.

== International career ==
Rawilson received his first call-up for the Malaysia national senior side in March 2018 following his impressive show in the opening quarter of the Malaysian League 2018. He made his international debut in the match against Cambodia on 10 September 2018.

== Career statistics ==
=== Club ===
As of 3 December 2023

Club	Season	League		Cup		League Cup		Continental		Total	
Club	Season	Apps	Goals	Apps	Goals	Apps	Goals	Apps	Goals	Apps	Goals
Sabah	2014	6	0	0	0	–		–		6	0
Sabah	2015	17	0	1	0	–		–		18	0
Sabah	2016	18	0	4	0	–		–		22	0
Sabah	2017	20	2	3	0	–		–		23	2
Sabah	2018	19	3	1	0	9	1	–		29	4
Sabah	2019	17	0	1	0	6	0	–		24	0
Sabah	2020	9	0	0	0	–		–		9	0
Sabah	2021	9	0	0	0	–		–		9	0
Sabah	2022	19	0	3	0	5	0	–		27	0
Sabah	2023	15	0	1	0	1	0	2	0	19	0
Sabah	2024	18	0	2	0	1	0	2	0	19	0
Sabah	2025	16	0	3	0	1	0	2	0	19	0
Total		193	5	19	0	26	1	2	0	201	6
Career total		193	5	19	0	26	1	2	0	201	6

=== International ===
As of 10 September 2018

Appearances and goals by national team and year
National team	Year	Apps	Goals
Malaysia	2018	1	0
Malaysia	Total	1	0

== Honour ==
Sabah FA

- Malaysia Premier League: 2019 (as defender - champion)

2026 Mfl Challenge Cup -Winners
