= Park Yong-joon =

South Korean footballer

Park Yong-Jun
Personal information
- Full name: Park Yong-Jun
- Date of birth: 21 June 1993 (age 33)
- Place of birth: South Korea
- Height: 1.76 m (5 ft 9 in)
- Position: Midfielder

Team information
- Current team: Perlis
- Number: 10

Youth career
- Suwon Samsung Bluewings

Senior career*
Years	Team	Apps	(Gls)
2013–2014	Suwon Samsung Bluewings	1	(0)
2014–2015	→Bucheon FC 1995 (loan)	25	(1)
2016	Nagaworld	11	(2)
2016–2017	Perlis	21	(2)

International career^{‡}
2011–2013	South Korea U-20	8	(0)
- * Club domestic league appearances and goals as of 14 February 2017 ‡ National team caps and goals as of 14 February 2014

Park Yong-joon (Korean: 박용준; born 21 June 1993) is a South Korean professional footballer who plays for Perlis FA in the Malaysia Premier League. He represented South Korea U-20 at 2013 FIFA U-20 World Cup.
