= 2019 Malaysia Premier League =

Malaysia Premier League
- Season: 2019
- Dates: 1 February – 20 July 2019
- Champions: Sabah; 1st Second Division title
- Promoted: Sabah; PDRM; UiTM
- Relegated: Sarawak
- Matches: 110
- Goals: 309 (2.81 per match)
- Top goalscorer: Žarko Korać (13 goals)
- Biggest home win: PDRM 6-2 Sarawak (11 May 2019)
- Biggest away win: UKM 0-5 UiTM (27 April 2019)
- Highest scoring: 9 goals Penang 6-3 Sarawak (14 July 2019)
- Longest winning run: 6 matches Sabah
- Longest unbeaten run: 11 matches Sabah
- Longest winless run: 9 matches Sarawak
- Longest losing run: 5 matches Selangor United
- All statistics correct as of 20 July 2019.

The 2019 Malaysia Premier League is the 16th season of the Malaysia Premier League, the second-tier professional football league in Malaysia since its establishment in 2004.

== Team changes ==
A total of twelve teams contested the league, including eight sides from the 2018 season, two relegated from the 2018 Malaysia Super League and two promoted from the 2018 Malaysia FAM League.

=== To Premier League ===
Relegated from Super League

- Kelantan
- Negeri Sembilan

Promoted from FAM League

- Selangor United
- Perlis ^{1}

=== From Premier League ===
Promoted to Super League

- FELDA United
- MIFA ^{2}

Relegated to M3 League

- None ^{3}

Notes:

^1 Originally Terengganu City were promoted along with Selangor United as champion of the 2018 Malaysia FAM League, but after Terengganu City blocked from promotion after failing to settle unpaid wages for former players and staffs for last season campaign, Perlis Northern Lions F.C. were invited as replacement after the team are able to showcase a proper financial management.

^2 Originally Felcra were promoted along with Felda United to the 2019 Malaysia Super League, but after Felcra announced their withdrawal from the Super League participation, MISC-MIFA, the next highest team in the Premier League table, were invited as replacement.

^3 No team are relegated from last season due to Kuantan FA expulsion, and Terengganu II being granted reprieve from relegation even though they finished in the bottom two of last season's league.

== Disqualification of Perlis Northern Lions F.C. ==
Earlier, Perlis Northern Lions F.C. together with six teams which are involved with debts are being instructed to submit financial documents before 18 February 2019. After the board of Malaysian Football League (MFL) examine in detail the document from Perlis Northern Lions F.C., it was concluded that Perlis Northern Lions F.C.'s revenue sources including sponsorships are insufficient to manage the teams in the Malaysian League this season. MFL had made the decision to revoke Perlis Northern Lions F.C. involvement in 2019 Malaysia Premier League starting from 20 February.

== Stadium and locations ==
Locations of teams in the 2018 Malaysia Premier League teams

Note: Table lists in alphabetical order.

| Team | Location | Stadium | Capacity |
|---|---|---|---|
| Johor Darul Ta'zim II | Pasir Gudang | Pasir Gudang Corporation Stadium | 15,000 |
| Kelantan | Kota Bharu | Sultan Muhammad IV Stadium | 30,000 |
| Negeri Sembilan | Seremban | Tuanku Abdul Rahman Stadium | 45,000 |
| PDRM^{1} | Selayang | Selayang Stadium | 11,098 |
| PDRM^{1} | Krubong/Paya Rumput | Hang Jebat Stadium | 40,000 |
| Penang | George Town | City Stadium | 20,000 |
| Sabah | Kota Kinabalu | Likas Stadium | 35,000 |
| Sarawak | Kuching | Sarawak State Stadium | 26,000 |
| Selangor United | Selayang | Selayang Stadium | 11,098 |
| Terengganu II | Kuala Terengganu | Sultan Ismail Nasiruddin Shah Stadium | 15,000 |
| UiTM | Shah Alam | UiTM Stadium | 10,000 |
| UKM | Kuala Lumpur | Kuala Lumpur Stadium | 18,000 |

- ^{1} : PDRM used Selayang Stadium until matchday 16. They moved into Hang Jebat Stadium since matchday 17

== Personnel and sponsoring ==
Note: Flags indicate national team as has been defined under FIFA eligibility rules. Players may hold more than one non-FIFA nationality.

| Team | Head coach | Captain | Kit manufacturer | Shirt sponsor(s) |
|---|---|---|---|---|
| Johor Darul Ta'zim II | (Croatia) Ervin Boban | (Malaysia) Shakir Shaari | Nike | Forest City |
| Kelantan | (Malaysia) Yusri Che Lah | (Malaysia) Farisham Ismail | PUC Sport | BMW |
| Negeri Sembilan | (Malaysia) Mat Zan Mat Aris | (Malaysia) Norhafiz Zamani Misbah | Rhino | Visit Negeri Sembilan, Matrix Concepts |
| PDRM | (Malaysia) E. Elavarasan | (Malaysia) Azmizi Azmi | Line 7 | PappaRich |
| Penang | (Malaysia) Manzoor Azwira Abdul Wahid | (South Korea) Kang Seung-jo | Stallion Apparel | Penang |
| Sabah | (Malaysia) Jelius Ating | (Malaysia) Rawilson Batuil | Carino | |
| Sarawak | (Malaysia) Mohamad Denny Da'ail (caretaker) | (Malaysia) Bobby Gonzales | Starsport | Press Metal |
| Selangor United | (Malaysia) Abdul Talib Sulaiman | (Central African Republic) Franklin Anzité | Sportsrevo | GT Radial |
| Terengganu II | (Malaysia) Tengku Hazman Raja Hassan | (Malaysia) Hasbullah Awang | Al-Ikhsan | Terengganu Inc. |
| UiTM | (Malaysia) Ismail Zakaria | (Malaysia) Zulkhairi Zulkeply | Puma | Master Halal, UiTM |
| UKM | (Malaysia) Sulaiman Hussin | (Malaysia) Asnan Ahmad | SkyHawk | UKM |

== Coaching changes ==
Note: Flags indicate national team as has been defined under FIFA eligibility rules. Players may hold more than one non-FIFA nationality.

| Team | Outgoing coach | Manner of departure | Date of vacancy | Position in table | Incoming coach | Date of appointment |
|---|---|---|---|---|---|---|
| Penang | (Malaysia) Zainal Abidin Hassan | End of contract | 30 September 2018 | Pre-season | (Malaysia) Ahmad Yusof | 5 October 2018 |
| Perlis | (Malaysia) Manja Man | Move to development coach | 30 September 2018 | Pre-season | (Malaysia) Manzoor Azwira | 16 October 2018 |
| UiTM | (Malaysia) Wan Mustaffa Wan Ismail | End of contract | 31 October 2018 | Pre-season | (Malaysia) Ismail Zakaria | 5 November 2018 |
| Sarawak | (Australia) Ian Gillan | End of contract | 31 October 2018 | Pre-season | (Malaysia) Pengiran Bala | 19 November 2018 |
| Negeri Sembilan | (Portugal) Mário Lemos | End of contract | 30 November 2018 | Pre-season | (Malaysia) Mat Zan Mat Aris | 6 December 2018 |
| Sarawak | (Malaysia) Pengiran Bala | Move to development coach | 5 January 2019 | Pre-season | (Malaysia) Farhan Abdullah @ Anai Igang | 5 January 2019 |
| PDRM | (Malaysia) Fauzi Pilus | Rested | 23 February 2019 | 11th | (Malaysia) Wan Mustaffa Wan Ismail (caretaker) | 23 February 2019 |
| Sarawak | (Malaysia) Farhan Abdullah | Rested | 3 March 2019 | 9th | (Malaysia) Mohamad Denny Da'ail (caretaker) | 3 March 2019 |
| Penang | (Malaysia) Ahmad Yusoff | Rested | 5 March 2019 | 8th | (Malaysia) Kamal Kalid (caretaker) | 5 March 2019 |
| PDRM | (Malaysia) Wan Mustaffa Wan Ismail (caretaker) | End of caretaker spell | 9 March 2019 | 11th | (Malaysia) E. Elavarasan | 12 March 2019 |
| Kelantan | (Croatia) Marko Kraljević | Sacked | 9 April 2019 | 9th | (Germany) Jörg Peter Steinebrunner (caretaker) | 9 April 2019 |
| Kelantan | (Germany) Jörg Peter Steinebrunner (caretaker) | End of caretaker spell | 15 April 2019 | 11th | (Malaysia) Yusri Che Lah | 15 April 2019 |
| Penang | (Malaysia) Kamal Kalid (caretaker) | End of caretaker spell | 18 April 2019 | 9th | (Malaysia) Manzoor Azwira Abdul Wahid | 18 April 2019 |

== Foreign players ==
The number of foreign players is restricted to four each team including at least one player from the AFC country.

Note: Flags indicate national team as has been defined under FIFA eligibility rules. Players may hold more than one non-FIFA nationality.

| Club | Player 1 | Player 2 | Player 3 | AFC player | Former player ^{4} |
|---|---|---|---|---|---|
| Johor Darul Ta'zim II | (Brazil) Bruno Soares | (Argentina) Nicolás Fernández | (Argentina) Lucas Ontivero | (Lebanon) Mohammed Ghaddar | |
| Kelantan | (France) L'Imam Seydi | | | | (Uruguay) Raúl Tarragona (Brazil) Flávio (Afghanistan) Mustafa Zazai (Brazil) Cássio |
| Negeri Sembilan | (Brazil) Matheus Vila | (Brazil) Almir | (Brazil) Igor Carneiro | (Japan) Shunsuke Nakatake | (Sierra Leone) Thomas Koroma |
| PDRM | (Montenegro) Argzim Redžović | (Nigeria) Uche Agba | (Liberia) Patrick Wleh | (South Korea) Lee Chang-hoon | (Montenegro) Benjamin Redžović (Brazil) Andrezinho (Central African Republic) David Manga |
| Penang | (Argentina) Ezequiel Agüero | (Brazil) Casagrande | (Argentina) Julián Bottaro | (South Korea) Kang Seung-jo | (Haiti) Sébastien Thurière (Australia) Ndumba Makeche |
| Sabah | (Angola) Aguinaldo | (Serbia) Rodoljub Paunović | (Turkmenistan) Ahmet Ataýew | (South Korea) Park Tae-soo | (Serbia) Luka Milunović (Brazil) Luiz Júnior |
| Sarawak | (Brazil) Pedrão | (Brazil) Rodrigo Amorim Oliviera | (Brazil) Hudson Jesus | (Indonesia) Rian Firmansyah | (Bosnia and Herzegovina) Muamer Salibašić |
| Selangor United | (Central African Republic) Franklin Anzité | (Montenegro) Danko Kovačević | (South Korea) Hwang Sin-young | (Uzbekistan) Nikita Pavlenko | (Argentina) Ezequiel Agüero (Egypt) Eslam Zaki |
| Terengganu II | (Ukraine) Serhii Andrieiev | (Ivory Coast) Dechi Marcel | (Nigeria) Akanni-Sunday Wasiu | (Japan) Bruno Suzuki | |
| UiTM | (South Sudan) Bernard Agele | (Brazil) Maycon Calijuri | (Montenegro) Žarko Korać | (South Korea) Park Yong-joon | (Brunei) Adi Said (Senegal) Robert Mendy (Kyrgyzstan) Akhlidin Israilov |
| UKM | (Romania) Alexandru Tudose | (Croatia) Mateo Roskam | (Nigeria) Ijezie Michael | (Iran) Milad Zeneyedpour | |

- ^4 Foreign players who left their clubs or were de-registered from playing squad due to medical issues or other matters.

== Results ==
=== League table ===
| Pos | Team | Pld | W | D | L | GF | GA | GD | Pts | Qualification or relegation |
|---|---|---|---|---|---|---|---|---|---|---|
| 1 | Sabah (C, P) | 20 | 13 | 4 | 3 | 33 | 17 | +16 | 43 | Promotion to Super League and Qualification for the Malaysia Cup group stage |
| 2 | Johor Darul Ta'zim II (Note: Johor Darul Ta'zim II and Terengganu II cannot be promoted from Premier League and play for Malaysia Cup as Johor Darul Ta'zim F.C. and Terengganu F.C. (their parent clubs) remain in Super League and play for Malaysia Cup. Should Johor Darul Ta'zim and Terengganu be relegated to Premier League or will not play for Malaysia Cup, Johor Darul Ta'zim II and Terengganu II will have to drop to M3 League or will play for Malaysia Cup.) | 20 | 9 | 6 | 5 | 31 | 19 | +12 | 33 | |
| 3 | PDRM (P) | 20 | 9 | 3 | 8 | 30 | 27 | +3 | 30 | Promotion to Super League and Qualification for the Malaysia Cup group stage |
| 4 | Terengganu II | 20 | 8 | 6 | 6 | 21 | 24 | −3 | 30 | |
| 5 | UiTM (Note: UiTM F.C. is promoted to replace PKNS F.C. relegated after withdrawing license to complete for the 2020 Malaysia Premier League season as they become feeder club to Selangor FA.) (P) | 20 | 8 | 5 | 7 | 33 | 25 | +8 | 29 | Promotion to Super League and Qualification for the Malaysia Cup group stage |
| 6 | Negeri Sembilan | 20 | 8 | 5 | 7 | 29 | 25 | +4 | 29 | Qualification for the Malaysia Cup group stage |
| 7 | Penang | 20 | 8 | 6 | 6 | 32 | 27 | +5 | 24 (Note: Penang have been docked six points following the club’s failure to comply with FIFA’s decision over claims made by former Brazilian import defender, Reinaldo Lobo.) | Qualification for the Malaysia Cup group stage |
| 8 | UKM | 20 | 6 | 4 | 10 | 28 | 32 | −4 | 22 | |
| 9 | Selangor United | 20 | 6 | 3 | 11 | 24 | 37 | −13 | 21 | |
| 10 | Kelantan | 20 | 4 | 8 | 8 | 23 | 32 | −9 | 17 (Note: Kelantan have been docked three points following the club’s failure to comply with FIFA’s decision over claims made by former technical director Alfredo Carlos Gonzalez.) | |
| 11 | Sarawak (R) | 20 | 4 | 4 | 12 | 25 | 44 | −19 | 16 | Qualification to relegation play-off |
| 12 | Perlis (Note: Perlis were disqualified on 20 February 2019.) | 0 | 0 | 0 | 0 | 0 | 0 | 0 | 0 | Disqualified |

Source: MFL
Rules for classification: 1) Points; 2) Goal difference; 3) Number of goals scored.
(C) Champions; (P) Promoted; (R) Relegated

=== Result table ===
| Home \ Away | JDT | KEL | NSE | PDR | PEN | SAB | SWK | SUN | TER | UIT | UKM |
|---|---|---|---|---|---|---|---|---|---|---|---|
| Johor Darul Ta'zim II | — | 2–0 | 3–0 | 0–1 | 0–2 | 0–1 | 1–1 | 2–0 | 5–0 | 2–0 | 2–1 |
| Kelantan | 1–1 | — | 2–5 | 0–1 | 2–1 | 3–3 | 0–0 | 2–0 | 1–1 | 0–0 | 2–0 |
| Negeri Sembilan | 3–1 | 3–1 | — | 2–3 | 1–1 | 0–0 | 2–1 | 3–0 | 1–0 | 1–4 | 0–1 |
| PDRM | 1–1 | 3–1 | 1–1 | — | 1–2 | 1–2 | 6–2 | 0–1 | 1–1 | 1–3 | 0–1 |
| Penang | 0–2 | 4–1 | 2–1 | 1–0 | — | 0–0 | 6–3 | 2–1 | 2–3 | 1–2 | 1–1 |
| Sabah | 1–2 | 1–0 | 1–0 | 3–1 | 2–0 | — | 4–1 | 1–0 | 3–1 | 1–1 | 3–1 |
| Sarawak | 1–1 | 1–1 | 2–4 | 0–1 | 2–0 | 1–2 | — | 3–1 | 1–0 | 0–2 | 1–3 |
| Selangor United | 2–2 | 1–0 | 0–0 | 2–3 | 1–3 | 2–1 | 3–2 | — | 3–1 | 1–2 | 2–6 |
| Terengganu II | 0–0 | 2–2 | 1–0 | 1–0 | 0–0 | 2–1 | 1–2 | 1–0 | — | 1–0 | 0–0 |
| UiTM | 1–2 | 3–3 | 1–1 | 1–2 | 3–3 | 1–2 | 2–1 | 1–2 | 0–1 | — | 1–0 |
| UKM | 3–2 | 0–1 | 0–1 | 2–3 | 1–1 | 0–1 | 4–0 | 2–2 | 2–4 | 0–5 | — |

Updated to match(es) played on 20 July 2019. Source: MFL
Legend: Blue = home team win; Yellow = draw; Red = away team win.
For upcoming matches, an "a" indicates there is an article about the rivalry between the two participants.

=== Positions by round ===
| Team ╲ Round | 1 | 2 | 3 | 4 | 5 | 6 | 7 | 8 | 9 | 10 | 11 | 12 | 13 | 14 | 15 | 16 | 17 | 18 | 19 | 20 | 21 | 22 |
|---|---|---|---|---|---|---|---|---|---|---|---|---|---|---|---|---|---|---|---|---|---|---|
| Sabah | 8 | 8 | 3 | 3 | 2 | 2 | 1 | 2 | 2 | 2 | 3 | 2 | 3 | 3 | 3 | 2 | 1 | 1 | 1 | 1 | 1 | 1 |
| Johor Darul Ta'zim II | 4 | 1 | 1 | 1 | 1 | 1 | 2 | 1 | 1 | 1 | 1 | 1 | 1 | 2 | 2 | 1 | 2 | 2 | 2 | 2 | 2 | 2 |
| PDRM | 12 | 11 | 12 | 11 | 11 | 11 | 11 | 11 | 10 | 10 | 8 | 7 | 6 | 6 | 8 | 7 | 7 | 7 | 7 | 5 | 3 | 3 (Note: PDRM FA were 4th but rose to 3rd and qualified for 2020 Malaysia Super League after Penang FA have been docked six points following the club’s failure to comply with FIFA’s decision over claims made by former Brazilian import defender, Reinaldo Lobo.) |
| Terengganu II | 2 | 2 | 5 | 4 | 5 | 5 | 6 | 5 | 5 | 5 | 4 | 4 | 4 | 4 | 4 | 4 | 4 | 4 | 4 | 6 | 7 | 4 (Note: Terengganu FC II were 5th but rose to 4th after Penang FA have been docked six points following the club’s failure to comply with FIFA’s decision over claims made by former Brazilian import defender, Reinaldo Lobo.) |
| UiTM | 1 | 9 | 2 | 5 | 4 | 3 | 3 | 3 | 3 | 3 | 2 | 3 | 2 | 1 | 1 | 3 | 3 | 3 | 3 | 3 | 4 | 5 (Note: UiTM F.C. were 6th but rose to 5th after Penang FA have been docked six points following the club’s failure to comply with FIFA’s decision over claims made by former Brazilian import defender, Reinaldo Lobo.) |
| Negeri Sembilan | 5 | 3 | 7 | 6 | 6 | 7 | 5 | 6 | 6 | 6 | 6 | 6 | 5 | 5 | 5 | 5 | 5 | 6 | 5 | 4 | 5 | 6 (Note: Negeri Sembilan FA were 7th but rose to 6th after Penang FA have been docked six points following the club’s failure to comply with FIFA’s decision over claims made by former Brazilian import defender, Reinaldo Lobo.) |
| Penang | 7 | 12 | 11 | 8 | 9 | 8 | 8 | 8 | 9 | 9 | 10 | 9 | 8 | 7 | 7 | 6 | 6 | 5 | 6 | 7 | 6 | 7 (Note: Penang FA were 3rd but dropped to 7th after Penang FA have been docked six points following the club’s failure to comply with FIFA’s decision over claims made by former Brazilian import defender, Reinaldo Lobo.) |
| UKM | 3 | 6 | 10 | 10 | 7 | 6 | 7 | 7 | 7 | 7 | 7 | 8 | 9 | 9 | 9 | 9 | 9 | 9 | 9 | 8 | 8 | 8 |
| Selangor United | 6 | 7 | 4 | 2 | 3 | 4 | 4 | 4 | 4 | 4 | 5 | 5 | 7 | 8 | 6 | 8 | 8 | 8 | 8 | 9 | 9 | 9 |
| Kelantan | 11 | 10 | 6 | 7 | 8 | 9 | 9 | 10 (Note: Kelantan FA were 9th but dropped to 10th after Kelantan FA have been docked three points following the club’s failure to comply with FIFA’s decision over claims made by former technical director Alfredo Carlos Gonzalez.) | 11 | 11 | 11 | 11 | 11 | 11 | 11 | 11 | 10 | 10 | 10 | 10 | 10 | 10 |
| Sarawak | 9 | 5 | 9 | 9 | 10 | 10 | 10 | 9 (Note: Sarawak FA were 10th but rose to 9th after Kelantan FA have been docked three points following the club’s failure to comply with FIFA’s decision over claims made by former technical director Alfredo Carlos Gonzalez.) | 8 | 8 | 9 | 10 | 10 | 10 | 10 | 10 | 11 | 11 | 11 | 11 | 11 | 11 |
| Perlis | 10 | 4 | 8 | DQ | DQ | DQ | DQ | DQ | DQ | DQ | DQ | DQ | DQ | DQ | DQ | DQ | DQ | DQ | DQ | DQ | DQ | DQ |

| Leader |
| Possible Relegation to 2020 M3 League |
| Relegation to 2020 M3 League |
| Disqualified |
| Qualified to 2019 Malaysia Cup |

Updated to match(es) played on 21 July 2019. Source:

=== Qualification to 2019 Malaysia Cup and Malaysia Challenge Cup ===
Based on the previous season, 5 teams from Malaysia Premier League will qualify into Malaysia Cup. Due to JDT II and Terengganu II status as feeder team, they cannot qualify into Malaysia Cup and will compete in Malaysia Challenge Cup. For the result, top 7 in the league besides these two teams will qualify, as JDT II and Terengganu II will finish in top 5.

Sabah FA became the first team to qualify to Malaysia Cup after Selangor United lost 2–3 to PDRM FA on June 26, given both of them 13 points difference with 4 matches remaining for Selangor United. UiTM F.C. followed Sabah to Malaysia Cup after Selangor United lost 0–2 to Kelantan FA on July 5 - even they also lost to PDRM FA one day after. On July 9, Negeri Sembilan FA became the third team to qualify after won 3–1 home by JDT II. Following 3–1 win over Kelantan FA, PDRM FA became the fourth team to qualify into Malaysia Cup. Penang FA grabbed the final slot to Malaysia Cup after demolished Sarawak FA 6–3 at home; the highest ever goal scored in this season.

Sarawak FA and Kelantan FA confirmed their places to Malaysia Challenge Cup after JDT II and Terengganu II, after PDRM FA won 2–1 by UiTM F.C. - give them 14 points and 10 points difference in 3 matches remaining for both of them respectively. After losing 2–6 to UKM F.C. on Matchday 20, Selangor United qualified into Malaysia Challenge Cup. On July 14, UKM F.C. - the inaugural Malaysia Challenge Cup runner-up, booked the slot into this competition after Penang FA won 6–3 at Bandaraya Stadium.

== Relegation play-offs ==
23 November 2019
20:15 UTC+8

| Kuching FA (Runners-up M3 League) | 3-1 | Sarawak |
|---|---|---|
| Sahran 9'; Hafis 77'; Joseph 85' | | Hudson 85' |

Sarawak State Stadium, Sarawak

== Season statistics ==
=== Scoring ===
- First goal of the season: Adi Said for UiTM F.C. against PDRM FA, 20 seconds (1 February 2019)
- Fastest goal in a match: 20 seconds – Adi Said for UiTM against PDRM (1 February 2019)
- Goal scored at the latest point in a match: 90+10 minutes – Akmal Zahir for UKM against Sarawak (2 March 2019)
- First own goal of the season: Rawilson Batuil (Sabah) for Kelantan, 53 minutes (8 February 2019)
- First hat-trick of the season: Žarko Korać (UiTM) against Kelantan, 71 minutes (8 March)
- Fastest hat-trick of the season: Bruno Suzuki (Terengganu II) against UKM, 11 minutes and 52 seconds (26 June)
- Most goals scored by one player in a match: 3 goals
  - Žarko Korać (UiTM) against Kelantan, 13', 25', 84' (8 March 2019)
  - Ferris Danial Mat Nasir (Negeri Sembilan) against Kelantan, 13', 44', 51' (20 April 2019)
  - Žarko Korać (UiTM) against UKM, 14', 54', 55' (27 April 2019)
  - Nicolás Fernández (JDT II) against Terengganu II, 14', 18', 89' (14 June 2019)
  - Casagrande (Penang) against UiTM, 34', 47', 90+6' (19 June 2019)
  - Bruno Suzuki (Terengganu II) against UKM, 11', 18', 23' (26 June 2019)
  - Rodoljub Paunović (Sabah) against Sarawak, 11', 63', 84' (26 June 2019)
  - Milad Zeneyedpour (UKM) against Selangor United, 31', 36', 75' (9 July 2019)
- Widest winning margin: 5 goals
  - UKM 0-5 UiTM (27 April 2019)
  - JDT II 5-0 Terengganu II (14 June 2019)
- Most goals in a match: 9 goals - Penang 6-3 Sarawak (14 July 2019)
- Most goals in one half: 5 goals
  - Selangor United vs UKM (9 July 2019) 0–3 at half time, 2–6 final
  - Penang vs Sarawak (14 July 2019) 5–0 at half time, 6–3 final
- Most goals in one half by a single team: 5 goals - Penang vs Sarawak (14 July 2019) 5–0 at half time, 6–3 final

=== Top scorers ===
As of matches played on 20 July 2019.

Players sorted first by goals, then by last name.

| Rank | Player | Club | Goals |
|---|---|---|---|
| 1 | (Montenegro) Žarko Korać | UiTM | 13 |
| 2 | (Serbia) Rodoljub Paunović | Sabah | 11 |
| 3 | (South Korea) Lee Chang-hoon | PDRM | 10 |
| 3 | (Croatia) Mateo Roskam | UKM | 10 |
| 5 | (Malaysia) Bobby Gonzales | Sarawak | 9 |
| 6 | (Argentina) Julián Bottaro | Penang | 8 |
| 6 | (Brazil) Casagrande | Penang | 8 |
| 6 | (Brazil) Igor Luiz | Negeri Sembilan | 8 |
| 9 | (Nigeria) Uche Agba | PDRM | 7 |
| 9 | (Argentina) Ezequiel Agüero^{1} | Selangor United/Penang | 7 |
| 9 | (Brazil) Hudson Dias | Sarawak | 7 |
| 9 | (Lebanon) Mohammed Ghaddar | Johor DT II | 7 |
| 9 | (Senegal) Robert Lopez Mendy | UiTM | 7 |
| 9 | (Brazil) Almir Neto | Negeri Sembilan | 7 |
| 9 | (Japan) Bruno Suzuki | Terengganu II | 7 |
| 9 | (Iran) Milad Zeneyedpour | UKM | 7 |
| 17 | (Malaysia) Rozaimi Rahman | Johor DT II | 6 |
| 17 | (Malaysia) Nik Akif Syahiran | Kelantan | 6 |
| 19 | (South Korea) Hwang Sin-young | Selangor United | 5 |
| 20 | (Malaysia) Nik Azli Nik Alias | Kelantan | 4 |
| 20 | (Malaysia) Ferris Danial | Negeri Sembilan | 4 |
| 20 | (Malaysia) Al-Hafiz Harun | Penang | 4 |
| 20 | (Malaysia) Alif Hassan | Sarawak | 4 |
| 20 | (Brazil) Flávio | Kelantan | 4 |
| 20 | (Brazil) Luiz Júnior | Sabah | 4 |
| 20 | (Malaysia) Raslam Khan | Selangor United | 4 |
| 20 | (Malaysia) Alto Linus | Sabah | 4 |
| 20 | (Angola) Aguinaldo | Sabah | 4 |
| 20 | (Japan) Shunsuke Nakatake | Negeri Sembilan | 4 |
| 20 | (Malaysia) Takhiyuddin Roslan | Terengganu II | 4 |
| 31 | 5 players | Various | 3 |
| 36 | 22 players | Various | 2 |
| 58 | 50 players | Various | 1 |
| Own Goals | | Various | 6 |

^{1} Aguero played for Selangor United until matchday 12 and scored 2 goals.

==== Hat-tricks ====
| Player | For | Against | Result | Date | Ref |
|---|---|---|---|---|---|
| (Montenegro) Žarko Korać | UiTM | Kelantan | 3-3 (H) | 8 March 2019 | |
| (Malaysia) Ferris Danial Mat Nasir | Negeri Sembilan | Kelantan | 2-5 (A) | 20 April 2019 | |
| (Montenegro) Žarko Korać | UiTM | UKM | 0-5 (A) | 27 April 2019 | |
| (Argentina) Nicolás Fernández | JDT II | Terengganu II | 5-0 (H) | 14 June 2019 | |
| (Brazil) Casagrande | UiTM | Penang | 3-3 (A) | 19 June 2019 | |
| (Serbia) Rodoljub Paunović | Sabah | Sarawak | 4-1 (H) | 26 June 2019 | |
| (Japan) Bruno Suzuki | Terengganu II | UKM | 2-4 (A) | 26 June 2019 | |
| (Iran) Milad Zeneyedpour | UKM | Selangor United | 2-6 (A) | 9 July 2019 | |

=== Clean sheets ===
As of matches played on 20 July 2019.

Players sorted first by clean sheets, then by last name.

| Rank | Player | Club | Clean sheets ^{5} |
|---|---|---|---|
| 1 | (Malaysia) Rozaimie Rohim | Sabah | 8 |
| 1 | (Malaysia) Shamirza Yusoff | Terengganu II | 8 |
| 3 | (Malaysia) Haziq Nadzli | Johor Darul Ta'zim II | 6 |
| 4 | (Malaysia) Haziq Aris | UiTM | 4 |
| 4 | (Malaysia) Kaharuddin Rahman | Negeri Sembilan | 4 |
| 6 | (Malaysia) Arif Abdullah | Kelantan | 3 |
| 6 | (Malaysia) Khatul Anuar | UKM | 3 |
| 6 | (Malaysia) Nuraizat Aziz | Selangor United | 3 |
| 6 | (Malaysia) Shahril Saa'ri | PDRM | 3 |
| 6 | (Malaysia) Zamir Selamat | Penang | 3 |
| 11 | (Malaysia) Fikri Che Soh | Kelantan | 2 |
| 11 | (Malaysia) Andy Nicholas | Sarawak | 2 |
| 13 | (Malaysia) Amin Faisal | UKM | 1 |
| 13 | (Malaysia) Hazrull Hafiz | Penang | 1 |
| 13 | (Malaysia) Amierul Nazrul Hakimi | Terengganu II | 1 |
| 13 | (Malaysia) Fadzley Rahim | Negeri Sembilan | 1 |
| 13 | (Malaysia) Samuel Somerville | Johor Darul Ta'zim II | 1 |
| 13 | (Malaysia) Shaiful Wazizi | Sarawak | 1 |

- ^5 Clean sheets are given to players who spend at least 45 minutes on the pitch without conceding a goal, even if their team concedes in the remainder of the match.
- Most clean sheets – Terengganu II (9)
- Fewest clean sheets – Sarawak (3)

=== Discipline ===
- First yellow card of the season: Shahurain Abu Samah for PDRM against UiTM, 23 minutes (1 February 2019)
- First red card of the season: Danial Haqim Draman for Kelantan against Sabah, 89 minutes (8 February 2019)
- Card given at latest point in a game: 90+9 minutes
  - Khairul Izuan (yellow) for PDRM against Penang (20 July 2019)
  - Khairul Izuan (red) for PDRM against Penang (20 July 2019)
- Most yellow cards in a single match: 9
  - UiTM 3-3 Penang – five for UiTM (Nazrin Bahri, Nur Areff Kamaruddin, Amer Azahar (2) and Park Yong-joon) and four for Penang (Che Safwan Hazman, Casagrande, Ezequiel Agüero and Kang Seung-jo) (19 June 2019)
- Most red cards in a single match: 3
  - PDRM 1–2 Penang - three for PDRM (Khairul Izuan, Shahril Saa'ri and Uche Agaba) (20 July 2019)

==== Player ====
As of matches played on 20 July 2019.

- Most yellow cards: 7
  - (Malaysia) Azwan Aripin (Kelantan)
  - (Malaysia) Rawilson Batuil (Sabah)
- Most red cards: 1
  - (Brazil) Bruno Soares (JDT II)
  - (Malaysia) Danial Haqim Draman (Kelantan)
  - (Malaysia) Nik Akif Syahiran Nik Mat (Kelantan)
  - (Malaysia) Aiman Khalidi (Negeri Sembilan)
  - (Malaysia) Aroon Kumar Ramaloo (Negeri Sembilan)
  - (Malaysia) Norhafiz Zamani Misbah (Negeri Sembilan)
  - (Malaysia) Khairul Izuan (PDRM)
  - (Malaysia) Shahril Saa'ri (PDRM)
  - (Nigeria) Uche Agaba (PDRM)
  - (Malaysia) Khairul Akmal Rokisham (Penang)
  - (Malaysia) Wan Syukri (Penang)
  - (Malaysia) Rafiq Shah Zaim (Selangor United)
  - (Malaysia) Amer Azahar (UiTM)
  - (South Sudan) Bernard Agele (UiTM)
  - (Malaysia) Faizal Arif (UiTM)
  - (South Korea) Park Yong-joon (UiTM)
  - (Montenegro) Žarko Korać (UiTM)
  - (Malaysia) Akmal Zahir (UKM)
  - (Malaysia) Saiful Hasnol (UKM)

==== Club ====
- Most yellow cards: 47
  - JDT II
- Most red cards: 5
  - UiTM

== Awards ==
=== Monthly awards ===
| Month | Player of the Month | | Reference |
| Month | Player | Club | Reference |
|---|---|---|---|
| February | (Serbia) Luka Milunović | Sabah | |
| March | (Brazil) Luiz Júnior | Sabah | |
| April | (Malaysia) Kumaahran Sathasivam | Johor Darul Ta'zim II | |
| May | (Malaysia) Rawilson Batuil | Sabah | |
| June | (Serbia) Rodoljub Paunović | Sabah | |
| July | (Nigeria) Uche Agba | PDRM | |

== Number of teams by states ==
| | States | Number | Teams |
|---|---|---|---|
| 1 | Selangor | 2 | Selangor United, UiTM |
| 2 | Johor | 1 | Johor Darul Ta'zim II |
| 2 | Kelantan | 1 | Kelantan |
| 2 | Kuala Lumpur | 1 | UKM |
| 2 | Malacca | 1 | PDRM |
| 2 | Negeri Sembilan | 1 | Negeri Sembilan |
| 2 | Penang | 1 | Penang |
| 2 | Sabah | 1 | Sabah |
| 2 | Sarawak | 1 | Sarawak |
| 2 | Terengganu | 1 | Terengganu II |

== See also ==
- 2019 Malaysia Super League
- 2019 Malaysia M3 League
- 2019 Malaysia M4 League
- 2019 Malaysia FA Cup
- 2019 Malaysia Cup
- 2019 Malaysia Challenge Cup
- 2019 Piala Presiden
- 2019 Piala Belia
- List of Malaysian football transfers 2019
