= Azwan Fattah =

Malaysian footballer

Azwan Abd Fattah
Personal information
- Full name: Mohd Azwan bin Abd Fattah
- Date of birth: 8 January 1994 (age 32)
- Place of birth: Semporna, Malaysia
- Height: 1.72 m (5 ft 8 in)
- Position: Midfielder

Team information
- Current team: Sabah
- Number: 18

Senior career*
| Years | Team | Apps | (Gls) |
| 2017– | Sabah | 15 | (0) |
- * Club domestic league appearances and goals as of 5 May 2021

Mohd Azwan bin Abd Fattah (born 8 January 1994) is a Malaysian professional footballer who plays as a midfielder for Malaysia Super League club Sabah.
