= Rodoljub Paunović =

Serbian footballer

Personal information
- Full name: Rodoljub Paunović
- Date of birth: 20 June 1985 (age 41)
- Place of birth: Belgrade, SFR Yugoslavia
- Height: 1.82 m (6 ft 0 in)
- Position: Forward

Senior career*
Years	Team	Apps	(Gls)
2003–2004	Ribnica Mionica		
2004–2005	Vujić Voda	25	(2)
2007–2008	Železničar Lajkovac	25	(5)
2009	Budućnost Valjevo	14	(5)
2009	Železnicar Lajkovac	13	(7)
2010	Zemun	17	(6)
2010–2011	BASK	29	(13)
2011–2012	Hajduk Kula	22	(3)
2013	TOT	7	(0)
2013	Jedinstvo Užice	12	(3)
2014	Thai Honda		
2015	Kolubara	13	(4)
2016	Krabi		
2017	Iskra Danilovgrad	14	(9)
2017	Sabah		
2018	Rudar Pljevlja	13	(4)
2020	Sabah	10	(4)
2021	Budućnost Valjevo		
- * Club domestic league appearances and goals as of 13 July 2020

Rodoljub Paunović (Serbian Cyrillic: Родољуб Пауновић; born 20 June 1985) is a Serbian retired footballer who plays as a forward. He became club president of Budućnost Krušik in July 2021.

== Club career ==
=== Sabah ===
In June 2017, Paunović signed for Malaysia Premier League side Sabah for 6 month contract with an option. On 30 June 2017, Paunović made his debut in a 1–0 victory over PDRM and providing an assist for Lee Kil-hoon goal. On 14 July 2017, Paunović scored the first goal for Sabah in a 0–1 away win against UiTM during league match. As in most of Sabah's matches, Paunović also become the key player on the team success to secured a place in the 2020 Malaysia Super League with many important goals delivered by him including the sole goal from 35 meters during the match against Johor Darul Ta'zim II F.C. for Sabah to lead the league table in 2019 Malaysia Premier League.
