= Žarko Korać (footballer) =

Montenegrin footballer

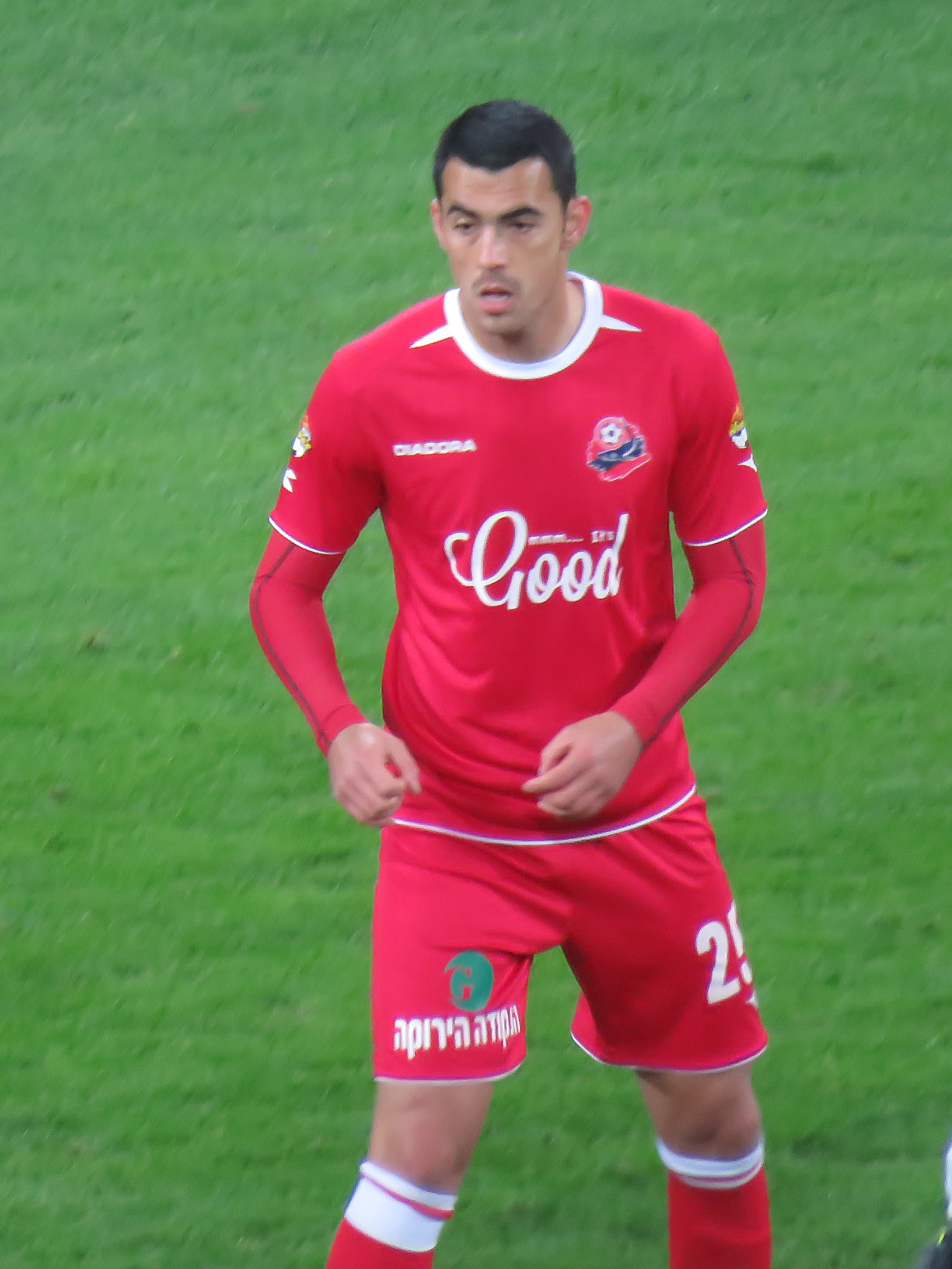

Personal information
- Full name: Žarko Korać
- Date of birth: 11 June 1987 (age 39)
- Place of birth: Golubovci, SR Montenegro, SFR Yugoslavia
- Height: 1.87 m (6 ft 2 in)
- Position: Forward

Team information
- Current team: Jedinstvo Bijelo Polje
- Number: 11

Senior career*
| Years | Team | Apps | (Gls) |
| 2005–2007 | Zeta | 35 | (16) |
| 2007–2008 | Vojvodina | 4 | (0) |
| 2008–2010 | Zeta | 29 | (17) |
| 2010 | Sheriff Tiraspol | 8 | (0) |
| 2011–2014 | Zeta | 80 | (45) |
| 2013–2014 | → Hapoel Haifa (loan) | 32 | (11) |
| 2014–2015 | Beitar Jerusalem | 14 | (5) |
| 2015–2017 | Hapoel Haifa | 40 | (5) |
| 2017 | Grbalj | 17 | (3) |
| 2018 | Kuantan | 4 | (5) |
| 2018 | Sisaket | 0 | (0) |
| 2019 | UiTM | 15 | (13) |
| 2020 | Hapoel Afula | 13 | (4) |
| 2021– | Jedinstvo Bijelo Polje | 165 | (77) |

International career
| 2007 | Montenegro U21 | 1 | (0) |
- * Club domestic league appearances and goals as of 1 June 2026

Žarko Korać (Cyrillic: Жарко Кораћ; born 11 June 1987) is a Montenegrin footballer who plays as a forward for Jedinstvo Bijelo Polje.

== Club career ==
Korać has played mainly with Montenegrin club FK Zeta, having achieved the title of Montenegrin First League top scorer in the season 2006–07.

After this early success, he decided to move abroad signing a contract with Serbian SuperLiga club FK Vojvodina. After not getting many chances there, he returned to FK Zeta in December 2008. He played there until January 2010 when he moved to Moldovan club FC Sheriff Tiraspol. In summer 2010 he returned to Zeta where he became a regular at the starting 11.

He finished the 2012–13 Montenegrin First League season as the co-top scorer with 15 goals. following this success he has been loaned to Hapoel Haifa of the Israeli Premier League, where he scored 11 goals, finishing as the 5th top scorer in the league.

On June 2, 2014, Korać has signed a four-year contract with Israeli club Beitar Jerusalem, with a salary of €160,000 per season. Beitar also paid €160,000 to Hapoel Haifa for his service. After just half a season in Beitar, Korać returned to Hapoel Haifa, where he played for two seasons between 2015 and 2017.

== Honours ==
Zeta

- Montenegrin First League: 2006–07

Individual

- Montenegrin First League top scorer: 2006–07, 2012–13, 2023–24, 2024–25
