= Alto Linus =

Malaysian footballer

Personal information
- Full name: Alto Linus
- Date of birth: 25 September 1986 (age 40)
- Place of birth: Keningau, Sabah, Malaysia
- Height: 1.68 m (5 ft 6 in)
- Positions: Midfielder; defender

Team information
- Current team: Sabah (assistant coach)

Senior career*
Years	Team	Apps	(Gls)
2010–2013	Sabah	?	(7)
2014	T-Team	0	(0)
2014–2022	Sabah	112	(5)

Managerial career
- 2023–: Sabah (assistant)
- 2024: Sabah (caretaker)
- 2025–2026: Sabah (interim)
- * Club domestic league appearances and goals as of 25 February 2023

Alto Linus (born 25 September 1986) is a former Malaysian footballer who plays as a midfielder and forward who is currently the assistant coach of Malaysia Super League club Sabah.

A versatile player, Alto has played in multiple positions, including on the wing and full-back. He notably played more than 200 matches for Sabah in the Malaysian League and holds the all-time record for most appearances for Sabah in the Malaysia Super League, playing 72 games between 2011–2012 and 2020–2022.

== Playing career ==
=== Early career ===
Alto played for an amateur team Keningau/Pedalaman FC in the SAFA Sabah League. He played as forward.

=== Sabah FA ===
Alto joined Sabah in 2010. He scored 4 goals for Sabah in his first season as Sabah were promoted to the 2011 Malaysia Super League.

=== T-Team ===
In 2014, he joined Kuala Terengganu based club T-Team but have a lack of playing time and demoted into T-Team President's Cup squad.

=== Return To Sabah ===
In April 2014, he return to his former team Sabah, making a comeback after only spending six month with T-Team. In June 2019, he scored an important goal against Negeri Sembilan at Likas Stadium to ensure Sabah's position at the top of league. Sabah won the 2019 Malaysia Premier League and promoted to the 2020 Malaysia Super League. Alto retired from playing professionally at the end of 2022 season.

=== International career ===
Alto Linus was called up by K. Rajagopal for centralized training in a preparation for 2012 AFF Suzuki Cup. However he did not make any official appearances for the national team.

== Career statistics ==
=== Club ===
As of 11 November 2022.

Appearances and goals by club, season and competition
Club	Season	League			Cup		League Cup		Other		Total	
Club	Season	Division	Apps	Goals	Apps	Goals	Apps	Goals	Apps	Goals	Apps	Goals
Sabah	2010	Malaysia Premier League		4		0		1	–			5
Sabah	2011	Malaysia Super League	22	0	1	0	6	1	–		29	1
Sabah	2012	Malaysia Super League	12	0	1	0	–		1	0	13	0
Sabah	2013	Malaysia Premier League	19	3	2	0	–		1	0	22	3
Sabah	Total			7		0		2	–			9
T-Team	2014	Malaysia Super League	0	0	0	0	–		–		0	0
T-Team	Total		0	0	0	0	0	0	–		0	0
Sabah	2014	Malaysia Premier League	7	0	–		–		–		7	0
Sabah	2015	Malaysia Premier League	16	1	1	0	–		–		17	1
Sabah	2016	Malaysia Premier League	21	0	4	0	–		–		25	0
Sabah	2017	Malaysia Premier League	15	0	3	0	–		–		18	0
Sabah	2018	Malaysia Premier League	3	0	0	0	9	0	–		12	0
Sabah	2019	Malaysia Premier League	12	4	0	0	6	0	–		18	4
Sabah	2020	Malaysia Super League	10	0	–		0	0	–		10	0
Sabah	2021	Malaysia Super League	20	0	–		6	0	–		26	0
Sabah	2022	Malaysia Super League	8	0	1	0	2	0	–		11	0
Sabah	Total		112	5	9	0	23	0	–		148	5
Career Total												

== Managerial career ==
Alto begin his coaching career as assistant coach for Sabah F.C. in a match against PDRM at the 2023 Malaysia Super League.

== Managerial statistics ==
As of 25 February 2026

Managerial record by team and tenure
Team	Nat.	From	To	Record								Ref.
Team	Nat.	From	To	G	W	D	L	GF	GA	GD	Win %	Ref.
Sabah (caretaker)	(Malaysia)	24 November 2024	9 December 2024	2	2	0	0	5	1	+4	100.00	
Sabah (interim)	(Malaysia)	19 December 2025	25 February 2026	9	2	3	4	13	20	−7	22.22	
Career Total				11	4	3	4	18	21	−3	36.36	

== Honours ==
=== Club ===
Sabah

- Malaysia Premier League (1): 2019
