= Park Tae-soo =

South Korean footballer (born 1989)

Personal information
- Full name: Park Tae-soo
- Date of birth: 1 December 1989 (age 36)
- Place of birth: Incheon, South Korea
- Height: 1.85 m (6 ft 1 in)
- Positions: Defensive midfielder; centre-back

Youth career
- 2005–2007: Anyang Technical High School
- 2008–2010: Hongik University

Senior career*
Years	Team	Apps	(Gls)
2011–2012	Incheon United	3	(0)
2013	Daejeon Hana Citizen	14	(0)
2014	Chungju Hummel	25	(1)
2015	FC Anyang	22	(0)
2016	Gyeongju KHNP	10	(0)
2017–2018	Hwaseong FC	0	(0)
2019–2025	Sabah	99	(20)
2025–2026	PDRM	18	(3)
- * Club domestic league appearances and goals as of 16 July 2026

- Korean Name
- Hangul: 박태수
- Hanja: 朴太洙
- RR: Bak Taesu
- MR: Pak T'aesu

Park Tae-soo (Korean: 박태수; born 1 December 1989) is a South Korean professional footballer who plays as a defensive midfielder or centre-back.

== Personal life ==
Park was born in Incheon and spent his adolescence there. He attended Anyang Middle School and Anyang Technical High School. He later attended Hongik University before starting his football senior career with Incheon United in 2011.

According to his social media account in Instagram, Park was married to a Korean woman in 2014 and has two children.

The family currently lives in Kota Kinabalu in Sabah, Malaysia.

== Club career ==
Park, a draftee from the 2011 K-League draft intake, was selected by Incheon United for the 2011 season, and his first appearance for his new club was in a K-League Cup match against Daejeon Citizen, playing nearly the entire second half of the match. His debut in the K-League was as a late substitute in Incheon's match against Gwangju FC on 22 May 2011.

=== Sabah ===
On 29 January 2019, Park was signed by the Malaysian Premier League club Sabah FA as their sole import defender player. Park scored an equaliser goal during one of the team's early matches against Terengganu F.C. II before the team sealed victory with two more goals scored by his teammates. During his career with the team, he has shown excellent defensive work to withstand pressure from opponent teams that resulted in Sabah securing top place in the 2019 Malaysia Premier League, thus qualifying for the 2020 Malaysia Super League.

== Statistics ==
As of 20 November 2022

Club Performance			League		Cup		League Cup		Total	
Season	Clubs	League	Apps	Goal	Apps	Goal	Apps	Goal	Apps	Goal
South Korea			League		KFA Cup		League Cup		Total	
2011	Incheon United	K-League 1	1	0	–		5	0	6	0
2012	Incheon United	K-League 1	2	0	–		–		2	0
2013	Daejeon Citizen	K-League 1	14	0	–		–		14	0
2014	Chungju Hummel	K-League 2	25	1	–		–		25	1
2015	FC Anyang	K-League 2	22	0	–		–		22	0
2016	Gyeongju KHNP	K3 League	10	0	–		–		10	0
2017	Hwaseong FC	K3 League			–		–			
2018	Hwaseong FC	K3 League			–		–			
Total			74	1	0	0	5	0	79	1
Malaysia			League		FA Cup		Piala Malaysia		Total	
2019	Sabah	Malaysia Premier League	17	1	1	0	6	0	24	1
2020	Sabah	Liga Super Malaysia	10	1	–		0	0	10	1
2021	Sabah	Liga Super Malaysia	18	2	–		7	0	25	2
2022	Sabah	Liga Super Malaysia	19	8	3	0	3	0	25	8
Total			64	12	4	0	16	0	84	12

== Honours ==
Sabah

- Malaysia Premier League: 2019
