= UiTM United =

Malaysian football club

- Full name: UiTM United Football Club
- Nickname: The Lion Troops
- Short name: UiTM
- Founded: 2008; 18 years ago, as UiTM FC; 2023; 3 years ago, as UiTM United
- Ground: UiTM Stadium; UiTM Shah Alam Sports Complex Football Field
- Capacity: 10,000; 500
- Owner: Universiti Teknologi MARA
- President: Azizan Abdullah
- Head coach: Yazli Yahaya
- League: Malaysia A2 Amateur League
Home colours	Away colours

UiTM United Football Club is a Malaysian football club based in Shah Alam, Selangor. The club seniors last played in the Malaysia A2 Amateur League. Founded in 2008, their home ground is 10,000-seater UiTM Stadium. The club is widely known as The Lion Troops. It is under the jurisdiction of the Universiti Teknologi MARA, a Malaysian public university based in Shah Alam, Selangor. For the 2026–27 Malaysia A1 Semi-Pro League season, their senior team merged with Malaysian University F.T. to Malaysian University-UiTM. Their reerves play in the Selangor Champions League.

== History ==
Founded in 2008, UiTM FC made club debut into Malaysian football by joining the third-tier league Malaysia FAM League in 2009. The club finishes third place in 2012 Malaysia FAM League and was promoted to the second-tier league, Malaysia Premier League in 2013 to replace USM FC, who were withdrawing from Malaysia Premier League due to financial difficulties.

On 25 July 2010, the club won the first edition of IPT League tournament by beating UKM FC 3–0 in the final at UiTM Stadium. UiTM FC's first goal was scored by Amirizdwan Taj before Fahrul Razi scored the second goal in the 37th minute. The third goal was an own goal by the UKM FC's Muhammed Suffian. Fahrul Razi was selected as the man of the match in the final.

During 2017 season, UiTM FC managed to qualify for the Malaysia Cup for the first time since the club's establishment. UiTM became the fifth teams from the Malaysia Premier League to qualify for the 2017 Malaysia Cup competition after the completion of the final fixtures in the first half of the season.

For 2019 season, UiTM FC managed to gain the fifth spot in the league. However, due to the status change of PKNS FC to the reserve team of Selangor FA, UiTM FC gains its promotion to play in the 2020 Malaysia Super League by default since Johor Darul Ta'zim II F.C. and Terengganu F.C. II were not allowed to play in the Malaysia Super League together with its parents club, Johor Darul Ta'zim F.C. and Terengganu F.C. It is the first time UiTM FC will play in the nation's top division league since its establishment.

UiTM's selection of players is somewhat unique in that the players, including import players, must undertake undergraduate courses in UiTM in order to be selected to the squad.

=== Crest ===
2008–2022 crest

== Former players ==
For details on former players, see Category:UiTM United players.

== Club officials (2024) ==
- President: Azizan Abdullah
- Deputy president: Mohd Bahrin Othman
- Secretary: Mustaza Ahmad
- Treasurer: Poazi Rosdi

== Coaching history ==
Years	Nationality	Name
2009–2011	(Malaysia)	Omar Ali
2012–2013	(Malaysia)	Azman Hj Eusoff
2013–2014	(Malaysia)	Mohd Azuan Muhd Zain
2015–2016	(Malaysia)	Raja Isa Raja Akram Shah
2016–2018	(Malaysia)	Wan Mustaffa Wan Ismail
2018–2019	(Malaysia)	Ismail Zakaria
2020–2022	(Germany)	Frank Bernhardt
2023–2026	(Malaysia)	Yazli Yahaya

== Achievements ==
Year	Position	League	Malaysia FA Cup	Malaysia Cup\Malaysia Challenge Cup	Top scorer (M-League)
2012	3rd (Promoted)	Malaysia FAM League	Round of 32	DNQ	
2013	9th	Malaysia Premier League	First round	DNQ	(Malaysia) Afham Zulkipli (4 goals)
2014	9th	Malaysia Premier League	First round	DNQ	(Nigeria) Obi Ikechukwu Charles (10 goals)
2015	8th	Malaysia Premier League	First round	DNQ	(Ivory Coast) Dao Bakary (10 goals)
2016	10th	Malaysia Premier League	Second round	DNQ	(Uzbekistan) Pavel Purishkin (8 goals)
2017	6th	Malaysia Premier League	Second round	Group Stage	(Nigeria) Akanni-Sunday Wasiu (19 goals)
2018	9th	Malaysia Premier League	Third round	Group stage	(Argentina) Lucas Pugh (8 goals)
2019	5th (Promoted)	Malaysia Premier League	Second round	Group Stage	(Serbia) Žarko Korać (13 goals)
2020	6th	Malaysia Super League	Round 2	Quarter-finals	(Brazil) Gustavo Almeida (6 goals)
2021	12th (Relegated)	Malaysia Super League	not held	DNQ	(South Korea) Yong-hyun Kwon (4 goals)
2022	7th (Relegated)	Malaysia Premier League	First round	Round of 16	(Malaysia) Zafri Zakaria (3 goals)
2023	1st (Champion)	Malaysia M4 League	DNQ	DNQ	(Malaysia) Muhammad Fakhrur Razi (10 goals)
2024–25	13th of 15	Malaysia A1 Semi-Pro League	DNQ	DNQ	(Malaysia) Mohammad Arif Imran Abdul Rahim (7 goals)
2025–26	5th (Group B)	Malaysia A2 Amateur League	DNQ	DNQ	(Malaysia) Shazril Uzair (2 goals) (Malaysia) Putra Daniel Danies (2 goals)

Champions	Runners-up	Third place	Promoted	Relegated

== Sponsorship ==
Period	Sportswear	Main sponsor
2012	Umbro	None
2013	Umbro	Kementerian Pengajian Tinggi
2014	Umbro	Kementerian Pendidikan Malaysia
2015	Umbro	Kementerian Pendidikan Malaysia
2016	Umbro	Soaring Upwords
2017	Umbro	Soaring Upwords
2018	Puma	Soaring Upwords, UiTM Holdings
2019	Puma	Master Halal, Active Sports
2020	Adidas, Fitech (Third kit)	Sukipt, Malaysia Airlines (third kit)
2021	Puma, Fitech	MBSA
2022	Let's Play	None
2023	Let's Play	Extra Joss, Finvalet Consultancy
2024–2026	Let's Play	MBSB Bank

== Honours ==
=== League ===
- Division 4/A2 League

(gold) Winners (1): 2023

- Division 3/FAM League

(bronze) Third place (1): 2012
