= Second Hajiji cabinet =

Malaysian cabinet

- 21st Cabinet of Sabah
- 2025–present
- Date formed: 1 December 2025

People and organisations
- Head of state: Musa Aman
- Head of government: Hajiji Noor (GRS–GAGASAN)
- Deputy head of government: Joachim Gunsalam (GRS–PBS); Masidi Manjun (GRS–GAGASAN); Ewon Benedick (GRS–UPKO)
- Total no. of members: 11
- Member parties: Gabungan Rakyat Sabah (GRS): Parti Gagasan Rakyat Sabah (GAGASAN); United Sabah Party (PBS); United Progressive Kinabalu Organisation (UPKO); Liberal Democratic Party of Sabah (LDP); Barisan Nasional (BN): United Malays National Organisation of Sabah (UMNO Sabah); United Sabah People's Party (PBRS); Pakatan Harapan (PH): People's Justice Party (PKR); Homeland Solidarity Party (STAR)
- Status in legislature: Coalition government with confidence & supply from Independent
- Opposition parties: Heritage Party (WARISAN); Social Democratic Harmony Party (KDM)
- Opposition leader: Mohd Shafie Apdal (WARISAN)

History
- Election: 2025 Sabah state election
- Legislature term: 17th Sabah State Legislative Assembly
- Budget: 2026
- Predecessor: First Hajiji cabinet

The second Hajiji cabinet took office on 1 December 2025, two days after the 2025 Sabah state election. The cabinet consists of ministers from the Gabungan Rakyat Sabah (GRS), Barisan Nasional (BN), and Pakatan Harapan (PH).

== Current arrangement ==
=== Ministers ===
GRS (9)	PH (1)	BN (1)
GAGASAN (6); PBS (2); UPKO (1)	PKR (1)	UMNO (1)

Portfolio	Officeholder	Party	Constituency	Took office	Left office
Chief Minister	Datuk Seri Panglima Haji Hajiji Noor	GRS (GAGASAN)	Sulaman	30 November 2025	Incumbent
Deputy Chief Minister	Datuk Seri Panglima Dr. Joachim Gunsalam	GRS (PBS)	Kundasang	1 December 2025	Incumbent
Deputy Chief Minister	Datuk Seri Panglima Haji Masidi Manjun	GRS (GAGASAN)	Karanaan	1 December 2025	Incumbent
Deputy Chief Minister	Datuk Ewon Benedick MP	GRS (UPKO)	Kadamaian	1 December 2025	Incumbent
Minister of Works and Utilities	Datuk Seri Panglima Dr. Joachim Gunsalam	GRS (PBS)	Kundasang	1 December 2025	Incumbent
Minister of Finance	Datuk Seri Panglima Haji Masidi Manjun	GRS (GAGASAN)	Karanaan	1 December 2025	Incumbent
Minister of Industrial Development, Entrepreneurship, and Transport	Datuk Ewon Benedick MP	GRS (UPKO)	Kadamaian	1 December 2025	Incumbent
Minister of Local Government and Housing	Datuk Dr. Haji Mohd Arifin Mohd Arif	GRS (GAGASAN)	Membakut	1 December 2025	Incumbent
Minister of Agriculture, Fisheries and Food industries	Datuk Jamawi Ja'afar	PH (PKR)	Melalap	1 December 2025	Incumbent
Minister of Rural Development	Datuk Rubin Balang	GRS (GAGASAN)	Kemabong	1 December 2025	Incumbent
Minister of Education, Science, Technology, and Innovation	Datuk James Ratib	GRS (GAGASAN)	Sugut	1 December 2025	Incumbent
Minister of Tourism, Culture, and Environment	Datuk Jafry Ariffin	BN (UMNO)	Sukau	1 December 2025	Incumbent
Minister of Women, Health, and Community Wellbeing	Datuk Julita Mojungki	GRS (PBS)	Matunggong	1 December 2025	Incumbent
Minister of Youth Development, Sports Advancement and Creative Industries	Datuk Nizam Abu Bakar Titingan	GRS (GAGASAN)	Apas	1 December 2025	Incumbent

=== Assistant Ministers ===
GRS (12)	BN (1)	STAR (1); Independent (4)
GAGASAN (8); PBS (4)	UMNO (1)	STAR (1); Independent (4)

Portfolio	Officeholder	Party	Constituency	Took office	Left office
Assistant Minister in the Chief Minister's Department	Datuk Joniston Bangkuai	GRS (PBS)	Kiulu	3 December 2025	Incumbent
Assistant Minister in the Chief Minister's Department	Datuk Isnin Aliasnih	GRS (GAGASAN)	Klias	3 December 2025	Incumbent
Assistant Minister in the Chief Minister's Department	Datuk Caesar Mandela Malakun	GRS (GAGASAN)	Nominated Member	3 December 2025	Incumbent
Assistant Minister of Works and Utilities	Datuk Limus Jury	GRS (GAGASAN)	Kuala Penyu	3 December 2025	Incumbent
Assistant Minister of Works and Utilities	Dato' Sri Dr. Ruddy Awah	GRS (GAGASAN)	Pitas	3 December 2025	Incumbent
Assistant Minister of Finance	Datuk Ben Chong Chen Bin	GRS (GAGASAN)	Tanjong Kapor	3 December 2025	Incumbent
Assistant Minister of Finance	Dato' Ishak Ayub	STAR	Bingkor	3 December 2025	Incumbent
Assistant Minister of Industry, Entrepreneurship and Transport	Datuk Jonnybone J Kurum	GRS (PBS)	Telupid	3 December 2025	Incumbent
Assistant Minister of Local Government and Housing	Datuk Fairuz Renddan	Independent	Pintasan	3 December 2025	Incumbent
Assistant Minister of Local Government and Housing	Datuk Maijol Mahap	Independent	Bandau	3 December 2025	Incumbent
Assistant Minister of Agriculture, Fisheries and Food Industry	Datuk Ruslan Muharam	GRS (PBS)	Lumadan	3 December 2025	Incumbent
Assistant Minister of Agriculture, Fisheries and Food Industry	Datuk Hendrus Anding	GRS (PBS)	Tandek	3 December 2025	Incumbent
Assistant Minister of Rural Development	Datuk Samad Jambri	GRS (GAGASAN)	Labuk	3 December 2025	Incumbent
Assistant Minister of Rural Development	Datuk Juil Nuatim	GRS (PBS)	Limbahau	3 December 2025	Incumbent
Assistant Minister of Education, Science, Technology and Innovation	Jordan Jude Ellron	Independent	Tulid	3 December 2025	Incumbent
Assistant Minister of Tourism, Culture and Environment	Dr. Andi Md Shamsureezal	GRS (GAGASAN)	Tanjung Batu	3 December 2025	Incumbent
Assistant Minister of Women, Health and Community Wellbeing	Datuk Rina Jainal	Independent	Kukusan	3 December 2025	Incumbent
Assistant Minister of Youth, Sports Development and Creative Economy	Dato' Sri Dr. Anil Jeet Singh	BN (UMNO)	Kunak	12 December 2025	Incumbent

=== Ex-officio members ===
Position	Office bearer
State Secretary	Zainudin Aman
State Attorney-General	Brendon Keith Soh
