= Results of the 2020 Sabah state election =

These are the election results of the 2020 Sabah state election. State assembly elections were held in Sabah, Malaysia on 26 September 2020 as part of the snap elections. Results are expected to come on the same day, after 5 pm. Elected members of the legislative assembly (MLAs) will be representing their constituency from the first sitting of respective state legislative assembly to its dissolution.

The state legislature election deposit was set at RM5,000 per candidate. Similar to previous elections, the election deposit will be forfeited if the particular candidate had failed to secure at least 12.5% or one-eighth of the votes.

== Full result ==
#	Constituency	Winner	Party	Votes	Opponent(s)	Party	Votes	Majority	Incumbent
GRS 38 | WARISAN+ 32 | Independent 3
N1	Banggi	Mohammad Mohamarin	WARISAN	1,773					
N1	Banggi	Mohammad Mohamarin	WARISAN	1,773	Akram Ismail	BN-UMNO	1,070	703	Mohammad Mohamarin (WARISAN)
N1	Banggi	Mohammad Mohamarin	WARISAN	1,773	Abdul Aziz Amir Bangsah	PPRS	11	703	Mohammad Mohamarin (WARISAN)
N1	Banggi	Mohammad Mohamarin	WARISAN	1,773	Salbin Muksin	USNO	48	703	Mohammad Mohamarin (WARISAN)
N1	Banggi	Mohammad Mohamarin	WARISAN	1,773	Kamri Kail	PCS	523	703	Mohammad Mohamarin (WARISAN)
N1	Banggi	Mohammad Mohamarin	WARISAN	1,773	Amir Kahar Mustapha	IND	261	703	Mohammad Mohamarin (WARISAN)
N1	Banggi	Mohammad Mohamarin	WARISAN	1,773	Miasin Nusiri	IND	178	703	Mohammad Mohamarin (WARISAN)
N2	Bengkoka	Harun Durabi	BN-UMNO	2,538					
N2	Bengkoka	Harun Durabi	BN-UMNO	2,538	Omar Jalun	USNO	174	1,337	New seat
N2	Bengkoka	Harun Durabi	BN-UMNO	2,538	Rita Cham	PPRS	19	1,337	New seat
N2	Bengkoka	Harun Durabi	BN-UMNO	2,538	Junsim Rumunzing	UPKO	1,201	1,337	New seat
N2	Bengkoka	Harun Durabi	BN-UMNO	2,538	Sotijin Juhui	GAGASAN	91	1,337	New seat
N2	Bengkoka	Harun Durabi	BN-UMNO	2,538	Jose Modsinupu	PCS	159	1,337	New seat
N2	Bengkoka	Harun Durabi	BN-UMNO	2,538	Samuil Mopun	PBS	898	1,337	New seat
N2	Bengkoka	Harun Durabi	BN-UMNO	2,538	Maklin Masiau	IND	1,149	1,337	New seat
N2	Bengkoka	Harun Durabi	BN-UMNO	2,538	Akian Ahkiew	IND	576	1,337	New seat
N2	Bengkoka	Harun Durabi	BN-UMNO	2,538	Mary Dumpangol @ Aminah Ambrose	IND	399	1,337	New seat
N2	Bengkoka	Harun Durabi	BN-UMNO	2,538	Pransol Tiying	IND	731	1,337	New seat
N3	Pitas	Ruddy Awah	IND	2,918				1,337	New seat
N3	Pitas	Ruddy Awah	IND	2,918	Sharif Sahar	PCS	314	559	Bolkiah Ismail (IND)
N3	Pitas	Ruddy Awah	IND	2,918	Sufian Abd Karim	BN-UMNO	2,359	559	Bolkiah Ismail (IND)
N3	Pitas	Ruddy Awah	IND	2,918	Ilasam Nurkasim	USNO	114	559	Bolkiah Ismail (IND)
N3	Pitas	Ruddy Awah	IND	2,918	Sharif Azman Sharif Along	WARISAN	1,565	559	Bolkiah Ismail (IND)
N4	Tanjong Kapor	Ben Chong Chen Bin	WARISAN	7,206				559	Bolkiah Ismail (IND)
N4	Tanjong Kapor	Ben Chong Chen Bin	WARISAN	7,206	Norlizah Gurmahan	PN-BERSATU	5,327	1,879	Ben Chong Chen Bin (WARISAN)
N4	Tanjong Kapor	Ben Chong Chen Bin	WARISAN	7,206	Chin Kee Yong	LDP	1,492	1,879	Ben Chong Chen Bin (WARISAN)
N4	Tanjong Kapor	Ben Chong Chen Bin	WARISAN	7,206	Awang Karim Abdul Kadir	USNO	211	1,879	Ben Chong Chen Bin (WARISAN)
N4	Tanjong Kapor	Ben Chong Chen Bin	WARISAN	7,206	Shawn Devay Robert Lee	PCS	221	1,879	Ben Chong Chen Bin (WARISAN)
N5	Matunggong	Julita Mojungki	PBS	4,369					
N5	Matunggong	Julita Mojungki	PBS	4,369	Richard Kastum @ Mosinal	BN-PBRS	2,859	1,510	Julita Mojungki (GBS-PBS)
N5	Matunggong	Julita Mojungki	PBS	4,369	Sazalye Donol Abdullah	PH-PKR	1,680	1,510	Julita Mojungki (GBS-PBS)
N5	Matunggong	Julita Mojungki	PBS	4,369	Sarapin Magana	PCS	843	1,510	Julita Mojungki (GBS-PBS)
N5	Matunggong	Julita Mojungki	PBS	4,369	Hibin Masalin	GAGASAN	223	1,510	Julita Mojungki (GBS-PBS)
N5	Matunggong	Julita Mojungki	PBS	4,369	Ronald Tampasok	IND	82	1,510	Julita Mojungki (GBS-PBS)
N5	Matunggong	Julita Mojungki	PBS	4,369	Paul Porodong	IND	1,069	1,510	Julita Mojungki (GBS-PBS)
N5	Matunggong	Julita Mojungki	PBS	4,369	Josef Emmanuel	IND	51	1,510	Julita Mojungki (GBS-PBS)
N6	Bandau	Wetrom @ Mohd Fikri Bahanda	PN-BERSATU	5,863				1,510	Julita Mojungki (GBS-PBS)
N6	Bandau	Wetrom @ Mohd Fikri Bahanda	PN-BERSATU	5,863	Azahari Amit	USNO	477	3,363	New seat
N6	Bandau	Wetrom @ Mohd Fikri Bahanda	PN-BERSATU	5,863	Webly Dissin	PCS	477	3,363	New seat
N6	Bandau	Wetrom @ Mohd Fikri Bahanda	PN-BERSATU	5,863	Majamis Timbong	WARISAN	2,500	3,363	New seat
N6	Bandau	Wetrom @ Mohd Fikri Bahanda	PN-BERSATU	5,863	Raphael Biun	LDP	331	3,363	New seat
N6	Bandau	Wetrom @ Mohd Fikri Bahanda	PN-BERSATU	5,863	Delly Surang @ Tolok	IND	58	3,363	New seat
N7	Tandek	Hendrus Anding	PBS	3,796					
N7	Tandek	Hendrus Anding	PBS	3,796	Padis Majingkin	UPKO	1,986	1,432	Anita Baranting (PN-STAR)
N7	Tandek	Hendrus Anding	PBS	3,796	Andy Villson	PCS	395	1,432	Anita Baranting (PN-STAR)
N7	Tandek	Hendrus Anding	PBS	3,796	Yillson Yanggun	BN-PBRS	1,520	1,432	Anita Baranting (PN-STAR)
N7	Tandek	Hendrus Anding	PBS	3,796	Liensin @ Danny Leinsin Limpakan	LDP	236	1,432	Anita Baranting (PN-STAR)
N7	Tandek	Hendrus Anding	PBS	3,796	Anita Baranting	IND	2,364	1,432	Anita Baranting (PN-STAR)
N8	Pintasan	Fairuz Renddan	PN-BERSATU	2,744					
N8	Pintasan	Fairuz Renddan	PN-BERSATU	2,744	Padlan Samad	PCS	188	84	New seat
N8	Pintasan	Fairuz Renddan	PN-BERSATU	2,744	Mohd Safian Saludin	WARISAN	1,816	84	New seat
N8	Pintasan	Fairuz Renddan	PN-BERSATU	2,744	Roslan Mayahman	PPRS	50	84	New seat
N8	Pintasan	Fairuz Renddan	PN-BERSATU	2,744	Pandikar Amin Mulia	USNO	2,660	84	New seat
N8	Pintasan	Fairuz Renddan	PN-BERSATU	2,744	Almudin Kaida	IND	780	84	New seat
N9	Tempasuk	Mohd Arsad Bistari	BN-UMNO	4,040					
N9	Tempasuk	Mohd Arsad Bistari	BN-UMNO	4,040	Mustapha Sakmud	PH-PKR	1,852	1,685	Musbah Jamli (IND)
N9	Tempasuk	Mohd Arsad Bistari	BN-UMNO	4,040	Kanul Gindol	GAGASAN	57	1,685	Musbah Jamli (IND)
N9	Tempasuk	Mohd Arsad Bistari	BN-UMNO	4,040	Amza @ Hamzah	USNO	471	1,685	Musbah Jamli (IND)
N9	Tempasuk	Mohd Arsad Bistari	BN-UMNO	4,040	Abdul Alif Saibeh	PCS	133	1,685	Musbah Jamli (IND)
N9	Tempasuk	Mohd Arsad Bistari	BN-UMNO	4,040	Musbah Jamli	IND	2,355	1,685	Musbah Jamli (IND)
N10	Usukan	Salleh Said Keruak	BN-UMNO	8,280					
N10	Usukan	Salleh Said Keruak	BN-UMNO	8,280	Abdul Bakhrin Mohd Yusof	WARISAN	3,982	4,298	Japlin Akim (PN-BERSATU)
N10	Usukan	Salleh Said Keruak	BN-UMNO	8,280	Datu Muhamad Nazaruddin	PCS	421	4,298	Japlin Akim (PN-BERSATU)
N11	Kadamaian	Ewon Benedick	UPKO	6,823					
N11	Kadamaian	Ewon Benedick	UPKO	6,823	Duanis Mogirong	BN-PBRS	2,050	3,459	Ewon Benedick (UPKO)
N11	Kadamaian	Ewon Benedick	UPKO	6,823	Leduing B Lengik Ernest	LDP	223	3,459	Ewon Benedick (UPKO)
N11	Kadamaian	Ewon Benedick	UPKO	6,823	Betting Giling	PCS	799	3,459	Ewon Benedick (UPKO)
N11	Kadamaian	Ewon Benedick	UPKO	6,823	Demis Rumanti	PBS	3,364	3,459	Ewon Benedick (UPKO)
N11	Kadamaian	Ewon Benedick	UPKO	6,823	Raiting Mohd Farhan	IND	101	3,459	Ewon Benedick (UPKO)
N12	Sulaman	Hajiji Noor	PN-BERSATU	5,919					
N12	Sulaman	Hajiji Noor	PN-BERSATU	5,919	Rekan bin Hussien	PBS	253	3,099	Hajiji Noor (PN-BERSATU)
N12	Sulaman	Hajiji Noor	PN-BERSATU	5,919	Aliasgar Basri	WARISAN	2,820	3,099	Hajiji Noor (PN-BERSATU)
N13	Pantai Dalit	Jasnih Daya	BN-UMNO	6,868					
N13	Pantai Dalit	Jasnih Daya	BN-UMNO	6,868	Rusdi Saelih	LDP	138	3,794	New seat
N13	Pantai Dalit	Jasnih Daya	BN-UMNO	6,868	Awil Kamsari	GAGASAN	46	3,794	New seat
N13	Pantai Dalit	Jasnih Daya	BN-UMNO	6,868	Utoh @ Rakam Sijim	WARISAN	3,074	3,794	New seat
N13	Pantai Dalit	Jasnih Daya	BN-UMNO	6,868	Matbee @ Matbeh Ismail	USNO	74	3,794	New seat
N13	Pantai Dalit	Jasnih Daya	BN-UMNO	6,868	Muhamad Amirul Amin	PCS	269	3,794	New seat
N13	Pantai Dalit	Jasnih Daya	BN-UMNO	6,868	Peter Pikul	IND	236	3,794	New seat
N13	Pantai Dalit	Jasnih Daya	BN-UMNO	6,868	Johan Jahid	IND	244	3,794	New seat
N14	Tamparuli	Jahid Jahim	PBS	6,843					
N14	Tamparuli	Jahid Jahim	PBS	6,843	Alijus Sipil	PH-PKR	3,326	3,517	Jahid Jahim (GBS-PBS)
N14	Tamparuli	Jahid Jahim	PBS	6,843	Dennis George	PCS	1,001	3,517	Jahid Jahim (GBS-PBS)
N14	Tamparuli	Jahid Jahim	PBS	6,843	Raymond Alfred	LDP	377	3,517	Jahid Jahim (GBS-PBS)
N15	Kiulu	Joniston Bangkuai	PBS	4,007					
N15	Kiulu	Joniston Bangkuai	PBS	4,007	Andau Yasun	PCS	363	1,221	Joniston Bangkuai (GBS-PBS)
N15	Kiulu	Joniston Bangkuai	PBS	4,007	Rozylyn @ Rosalyn Gelenu	LDP	274	1,221	Joniston Bangkuai (GBS-PBS)
N15	Kiulu	Joniston Bangkuai	PBS	4,007	Wilfred Madius Tangau	UPKO	2,786	1,221	Joniston Bangkuai (GBS-PBS)
N15	Kiulu	Joniston Bangkuai	PBS	4,007	Jolianis Lampong	IND	20	1,221	Joniston Bangkuai (GBS-PBS)
N15	Kiulu	Joniston Bangkuai	PBS	4,007	Dominic Yasun	IND	266	1,221	Joniston Bangkuai (GBS-PBS)
N16	Karambunai	Yakub Khan	BN-UMNO	5,180					
N16	Karambunai	Yakub Khan	BN-UMNO	5,180	Nerudin Ludah	GAGASAN	285	16	Azhar Matussin (WARISAN)
N16	Karambunai	Yakub Khan	BN-UMNO	5,180	Ibrahim Linggam	USNO	90	16	Azhar Matussin (WARISAN)
N16	Karambunai	Yakub Khan	BN-UMNO	5,180	Marajoh Unding	LDP	1,053	16	Azhar Matussin (WARISAN)
N16	Karambunai	Yakub Khan	BN-UMNO	5,180	Dayang Ku Aisyah	PCS	315	16	Azhar Matussin (WARISAN)
N16	Karambunai	Yakub Khan	BN-UMNO	5,180	Ahmad Jais Otong	WARISAN	5,164	16	Azhar Matussin (WARISAN)
N17	Darau	Azhar Matussin	WARISAN	5,805					
N17	Darau	Azhar Matussin	WARISAN	5,805	Laliman Kemad @ Laliman Bin Ahmad	USNO	244	562	New seat
N17	Darau	Azhar Matussin	WARISAN	5,805	Marino Ahmad	LDP	322	562	New seat
N17	Darau	Azhar Matussin	WARISAN	5,805	Jumat Idris	BN-UMNO	5,243	562	New seat
N17	Darau	Azhar Matussin	WARISAN	5,805	Dasim @ Ricky Jikah	GAGASAN	34	562	New seat
N17	Darau	Azhar Matussin	WARISAN	5,805	Ansari Abdullah	PCS	280	562	New seat
N18	Inanam	Peto Galim	PH-PKR	8,586					
N18	Inanam	Peto Galim	PH-PKR	8,586	William Mojimbon	PBS	2,948	5,638	Kenny Chua Teck Ho (PN-STAR)
N18	Inanam	Peto Galim	PH-PKR	8,586	Terrence Tsen	ANAK NEGERI	255	5,638	Kenny Chua Teck Ho (PN-STAR)
N18	Inanam	Peto Galim	PH-PKR	8,586	Regina Lim	PCS	291	5,638	Kenny Chua Teck Ho (PN-STAR)
N18	Inanam	Peto Galim	PH-PKR	8,586	Francis Goh Fah Shun	GAGASAN	362	5,638	Kenny Chua Teck Ho (PN-STAR)
N18	Inanam	Peto Galim	PH-PKR	8,586	Mohd Hardy Abdullah @ Zoro Yukon	USNO	156	5,638	Kenny Chua Teck Ho (PN-STAR)
N18	Inanam	Peto Galim	PH-PKR	8,586	Chong Kah Kiat	LDP	1,606	5,638	Kenny Chua Teck Ho (PN-STAR)
N18	Inanam	Peto Galim	PH-PKR	8,586	Kenny Chua Teck Ho	IND	2,346	5,638	Kenny Chua Teck Ho (PN-STAR)
N18	Inanam	Peto Galim	PH-PKR	8,586	Achmad Noorasyrul Noortaip	IND	286	5,638	Kenny Chua Teck Ho (PN-STAR)
N18	Inanam	Peto Galim	PH-PKR	8,586	George Ngui	IND	54	5,638	Kenny Chua Teck Ho (PN-STAR)
N19	Likas	Tan Lee Fatt	PH-DAP	8,174					
N19	Likas	Tan Lee Fatt	PH-DAP	8,174	Lu Siaw Wee @ Jeff	PCS	164	7,517	Tan Lee Fatt (PH-DAP)
N19	Likas	Tan Lee Fatt	PH-DAP	8,174	Daniel Isaac Hoong	USNO	81	7,517	Tan Lee Fatt (PH-DAP)
N19	Likas	Tan Lee Fatt	PH-DAP	8,174	Sim Fui	LDP	276	7,517	Tan Lee Fatt (PH-DAP)
N19	Likas	Tan Lee Fatt	PH-DAP	8,174	Chong Chee Vui	PPRS	22	7,517	Tan Lee Fatt (PH-DAP)
N19	Likas	Tan Lee Fatt	PH-DAP	8,174	Chang Kee Ying	BN-MCA	656	7,517	Tan Lee Fatt (PH-DAP)
N19	Likas	Tan Lee Fatt	PH-DAP	8,174	Chia Chui Ket Melanie	IND	95	7,517	Tan Lee Fatt (PH-DAP)
N20	Api-Api	Christina Liew Chin Jin	PH-PKR	7,796					
N20	Api-Api	Christina Liew Chin Jin	PH-PKR	7,796	Pang Yuk Min	PCS	431	5,347	Christina Liew Chin Jin (PH-PKR)
N20	Api-Api	Christina Liew Chin Jin	PH-PKR	7,796	Chin Su Phin	LDP	317	5,347	Christina Liew Chin Jin (PH-PKR)
N20	Api-Api	Christina Liew Chin Jin	PH-PKR	7,796	Lo Yau Foh	PPRS	280	5,347	Christina Liew Chin Jin (PH-PKR)
N20	Api-Api	Christina Liew Chin Jin	PH-PKR	7,796	Yee Moh Chai	PBS	2,449	5,347	Christina Liew Chin Jin (PH-PKR)
N20	Api-Api	Christina Liew Chin Jin	PH-PKR	7,796	Chong Tze Kiun	GAGASAN	97	5,347	Christina Liew Chin Jin (PH-PKR)
N20	Api-Api	Christina Liew Chin Jin	PH-PKR	7,796	Marcel Jude MS Joseph	IND	16	5,347	Christina Liew Chin Jin (PH-PKR)
N20	Api-Api	Christina Liew Chin Jin	PH-PKR	7,796	Sim Sie Hong	IND	72	5,347	Christina Liew Chin Jin (PH-PKR)
N20	Api-Api	Christina Liew Chin Jin	PH-PKR	7,796	Ng Chun Sua	IND	41	5,347	Christina Liew Chin Jin (PH-PKR)
N21	Luyang	Phoong Jin Zhe	PH-DAP	15,510					
N21	Luyang	Phoong Jin Zhe	PH-DAP	15,510	Gee Tien Siong	PN-SAPP	989	14,521	Phoong Jin Zhe (PH-DAP)
N21	Luyang	Phoong Jin Zhe	PH-DAP	15,510	Hiew King Cheu	GAGASAN	62	14,521	Phoong Jin Zhe (PH-DAP)
N21	Luyang	Phoong Jin Zhe	PH-DAP	15,510	Chong Yuk Ken	LDP	279	14,521	Phoong Jin Zhe (PH-DAP)
N21	Luyang	Phoong Jin Zhe	PH-DAP	15,510	Wilson Chang Khai Sim	PCS	190	14,521	Phoong Jin Zhe (PH-DAP)
N21	Luyang	Phoong Jin Zhe	PH-DAP	15,510	Chin Ling Ling Michelle	IND	97	14,521	Phoong Jin Zhe (PH-DAP)
N22	Tanjung Aru (previously known as Tanjong Aru)	Junz Wong Hong Jun	WARISAN	5,685					
N22	Tanjung Aru (previously known as Tanjong Aru)	Junz Wong Hong Jun	WARISAN	5,685	Rizawani Fiona Heng	GAGASAN	25	3,147	Wong Hong Jun (WARISAN)
N22	Tanjung Aru (previously known as Tanjong Aru)	Junz Wong Hong Jun	WARISAN	5,685	Shaffik Risaib Shah	USNO	88	3,147	Wong Hong Jun (WARISAN)
N22	Tanjung Aru (previously known as Tanjong Aru)	Junz Wong Hong Jun	WARISAN	5,685	Mohd Reduan Aklee	BN-UMNO	2,538	3,147	Wong Hong Jun (WARISAN)
N22	Tanjung Aru (previously known as Tanjong Aru)	Junz Wong Hong Jun	WARISAN	5,685	Noran Eddy Sukiran	PCS	241	3,147	Wong Hong Jun (WARISAN)
N22	Tanjung Aru (previously known as Tanjong Aru)	Junz Wong Hong Jun	WARISAN	5,685	Yong Oui Fah	PBS	647	3,147	Wong Hong Jun (WARISAN)
N22	Tanjung Aru (previously known as Tanjong Aru)	Junz Wong Hong Jun	WARISAN	5,685	Ibrahim Mohd Laiman Diki	LDP	179	3,147	Wong Hong Jun (WARISAN)
N22	Tanjung Aru (previously known as Tanjong Aru)	Junz Wong Hong Jun	WARISAN	5,685	Jan Chow Yee Fah	IND	18	3,147	Wong Hong Jun (WARISAN)
N23	Petagas	Awang Ahmad Sah Awang Sahari	WARISAN	4,125					
N23	Petagas	Awang Ahmad Sah Awang Sahari	WARISAN	4,125	Ahmad Farid Sainuri	PCS	355	261	Uda Sulai (WARISAN)
N23	Petagas	Awang Ahmad Sah Awang Sahari	WARISAN	4,125	Arsit Sedi	PN-BERSATU	3,864	261	Uda Sulai (WARISAN)
N23	Petagas	Awang Ahmad Sah Awang Sahari	WARISAN	4,125	Jecky Lettong @ Thaddeus Jack	LDP	118	261	Uda Sulai (WARISAN)
N23	Petagas	Awang Ahmad Sah Awang Sahari	WARISAN	4,125	Mohamad Kulat	GAGASAN	33	261	Uda Sulai (WARISAN)
N23	Petagas	Awang Ahmad Sah Awang Sahari	WARISAN	4,125	Paul Nointien	IND	572	261	Uda Sulai (WARISAN)
N24	Tanjung Keramat	Shahelmey Yahya	BN-UMNO	4,594					
N24	Tanjung Keramat	Shahelmey Yahya	BN-UMNO	4,594	Ira Uzair	PCS	363	1,124	New seat
N24	Tanjung Keramat	Shahelmey Yahya	BN-UMNO	4,594	Mohd Salleh Lamsin	USNO	122	1,124	New seat
N24	Tanjung Keramat	Shahelmey Yahya	BN-UMNO	4,594	Faezahwaty Abdul Mohamed Ibnu	LDP	329	1,124	New seat
N24	Tanjung Keramat	Shahelmey Yahya	BN-UMNO	4,594	Rosday @ Rosdy Wasli	PH-AMANAH	3,470	1,124	New seat
N25	Kapayan	Jannie Lasimbang	PH-DAP	15,052					
N25	Kapayan	Jannie Lasimbang	PH-DAP	15,052	Yong Wui Chung	LDP	428	13,163	Jannie Lasimbang (PH-DAP)
N25	Kapayan	Jannie Lasimbang	PH-DAP	15,052	Stephen Jimbangan	GAGASAN	892	13,163	Jannie Lasimbang (PH-DAP)
N25	Kapayan	Jannie Lasimbang	PH-DAP	15,052	Edwin Bosi	PBS	803	13,163	Jannie Lasimbang (PH-DAP)
N25	Kapayan	Jannie Lasimbang	PH-DAP	15,052	Lu Yeng Tung	BN-MCA	1,889	13,163	Jannie Lasimbang (PH-DAP)
N25	Kapayan	Jannie Lasimbang	PH-DAP	15,052	Chua Juan Shin	PCS	325	13,163	Jannie Lasimbang (PH-DAP)
N25	Kapayan	Jannie Lasimbang	PH-DAP	15,052	Chew Shung Seng	IND	58	13,163	Jannie Lasimbang (PH-DAP)
N26	Moyog	Darell Leiking	WARISAN	8,437					
N26	Moyog	Darell Leiking	WARISAN	8,437	Vinson Loijon @ Patrick	PPRS	82	5,935	Jennifer Lasimbang (WARISAN)
N26	Moyog	Darell Leiking	WARISAN	8,437	John Chryso	PBS	1,175	5,935	Jennifer Lasimbang (WARISAN)
N26	Moyog	Darell Leiking	WARISAN	8,437	Joseph Sulaiman	PN-BERSATU	2,502	5,935	Jennifer Lasimbang (WARISAN)
N26	Moyog	Darell Leiking	WARISAN	8,437	Nicholas Sampil @ William	PCS	975	5,935	Jennifer Lasimbang (WARISAN)
N26	Moyog	Darell Leiking	WARISAN	8,437	Marcel Annol	LDP	185	5,935	Jennifer Lasimbang (WARISAN)
N26	Moyog	Darell Leiking	WARISAN	8,437	Robert Richard Foo	IND	71	5,935	Jennifer Lasimbang (WARISAN)
N27	Limbahau	Juil Nuatim	WARISAN	5,194					
N27	Limbahau	Juil Nuatim	WARISAN	5,194	Johnny Mositun	PBS	2,671	2,523	New seat
N27	Limbahau	Juil Nuatim	WARISAN	5,194	Aubrey G Sham	PCS	249	2,523	New seat
N27	Limbahau	Juil Nuatim	WARISAN	5,194	Evelyn June Charlie	GAGASAN	34	2,523	New seat
N27	Limbahau	Juil Nuatim	WARISAN	5,194	Michael Frederick	LDP	473	2,523	New seat
N27	Limbahau	Juil Nuatim	WARISAN	5,194	Jainim Jaris @ Susanna Jainim	USNO	54	2,523	New seat
N27	Limbahau	Juil Nuatim	WARISAN	5,194	Lawrence Francis	IND	354	2,523	New seat
N27	Limbahau	Juil Nuatim	WARISAN	5,194	Pius Lokium	IND	64	2,523	New seat
N28	Kawang	Ghulam Haidar Khan Bahadar	PN-BERSATU	7,747					
N28	Kawang	Ghulam Haidar Khan Bahadar	PN-BERSATU	7,747	Janrywine J Lusin	LDP	119	5,094	Ghulam Haidar Khan Bahadar (PN-BERSATU)
N28	Kawang	Ghulam Haidar Khan Bahadar	PN-BERSATU	7,747	Awang Arip Nasib @ Ag Arif Nasip	USNO	163	5,094	Ghulam Haidar Khan Bahadar (PN-BERSATU)
N28	Kawang	Ghulam Haidar Khan Bahadar	PN-BERSATU	7,747	Abdul Rahim Lasim	PCS	192	5,094	Ghulam Haidar Khan Bahadar (PN-BERSATU)
N28	Kawang	Ghulam Haidar Khan Bahadar	PN-BERSATU	7,747	Musli Sapan @ Mushafien	WARISAN	2,653	5,094	Ghulam Haidar Khan Bahadar (PN-BERSATU)
N29	Pantai Manis	Mohd Tamin @ Tamin Zainal	BN-UMNO	5,116					
N29	Pantai Manis	Mohd Tamin @ Tamin Zainal	BN-UMNO	5,116	Awang Damit @ Awg Sahzain Pg Abd Razak	USNO	151	686	Aidi Moktar (WARISAN)
N29	Pantai Manis	Mohd Tamin @ Tamin Zainal	BN-UMNO	5,116	Mazreca John	LDP	127	686	Aidi Moktar (WARISAN)
N29	Pantai Manis	Mohd Tamin @ Tamin Zainal	BN-UMNO	5,116	Yahya Awang Kahar	WARISAN	4,430	686	Aidi Moktar (WARISAN)
N29	Pantai Manis	Mohd Tamin @ Tamin Zainal	BN-UMNO	5,116	Fauzi Ibrahim	PCS	499	686	Aidi Moktar (WARISAN)
N30	Bongawan	Daud Yusof	WARISAN	5,400					
N30	Bongawan	Daud Yusof	WARISAN	5,400	Ag Lahap Ag Bakar @ Ag Syairin	BN-UMNO	3,548	1,802	Daud Yusof (WARISAN)
N30	Bongawan	Daud Yusof	WARISAN	5,400	Anifah Aman	PCS	3,598	1,802	Daud Yusof (WARISAN)
N30	Bongawan	Daud Yusof	WARISAN	5,400	Mohd Azree Abd Ghani	LDP	232	1,802	Daud Yusof (WARISAN)
N31	Membakut	Mohd. Arifin Mohd. Arif	PN-BERSATU	6,363					
N31	Membakut	Mohd. Arifin Mohd. Arif	PN-BERSATU	6,363	Seniati Abd Ghani	USNO	63	3,421	Mohd. Arifin Mohd. Arif (PN-BERSATU)
N31	Membakut	Mohd. Arifin Mohd. Arif	PN-BERSATU	6,363	Mohd. Kamarudin Abdul Hamid	WARISAN	2,942	3,421	Mohd. Arifin Mohd. Arif (PN-BERSATU)
N31	Membakut	Mohd. Arifin Mohd. Arif	PN-BERSATU	6,363	Saad Awang Damin	PCS	526	3,421	Mohd. Arifin Mohd. Arif (PN-BERSATU)
N31	Membakut	Mohd. Arifin Mohd. Arif	PN-BERSATU	6,363	Ag Duramin Tafa	IND	588	3,421	Mohd. Arifin Mohd. Arif (PN-BERSATU)
N32	Klias	Isnin Aliasnih	PN-BERSATU	6,711					
N32	Klias	Isnin Aliasnih	PN-BERSATU	6,711	Maksit Saidi	GAGASAN	55	3,901	Isnin Aliasnih (PN-BERSATU)
N32	Klias	Isnin Aliasnih	PN-BERSATU	6,711	Abdullah Okin	PCS	1,419	3,901	Isnin Aliasnih (PN-BERSATU)
N32	Klias	Isnin Aliasnih	PN-BERSATU	6,711	Amsir Dani	USNO	122	3,901	Isnin Aliasnih (PN-BERSATU)
N32	Klias	Isnin Aliasnih	PN-BERSATU	6,711	Abdul Rahman Md Yakub	PH-PKR	2810	3,901	Isnin Aliasnih (PN-BERSATU)
N32	Klias	Isnin Aliasnih	PN-BERSATU	6,711	Jismit Japong	IND	86	3,901	Isnin Aliasnih (PN-BERSATU)
N33	Kuala Penyu	Limus Jury	PN-BERSATU	6,256					
N33	Kuala Penyu	Limus Jury	PN-BERSATU	6,256	Jepri Mapat	LDP	138	3,273	Limus Jury (PN-BERSATU)
N33	Kuala Penyu	Limus Jury	PN-BERSATU	6,256	Nelson W. Anggang	UPKO	2,983	3,273	Limus Jury (PN-BERSATU)
N33	Kuala Penyu	Limus Jury	PN-BERSATU	6,256	Cecelia Jompiuh	PCS	181	3,273	Limus Jury (PN-BERSATU)
N33	Kuala Penyu	Limus Jury	PN-BERSATU	6,256	Parijik @ Fredzex Bagang	GAGASAN	84	3,273	Limus Jury (PN-BERSATU)
N33	Kuala Penyu	Limus Jury	PN-BERSATU	6,256	Mohd Fadzlee Lee Abdullah @ Chun Lee	IND	2,947	3,273	Limus Jury (PN-BERSATU)
N34	Lumadan	Ruslan Muharam	PBS	3,650					
N34	Lumadan	Ruslan Muharam	PBS	3,650	Dayang Aezzy Liman	HR	59	364	Matbali Musah (PN-BERSATU)
N34	Lumadan	Ruslan Muharam	PBS	3,650	Kamarlin Ombi	BN-UMNO	3,286	364	Matbali Musah (PN-BERSATU)
N34	Lumadan	Ruslan Muharam	PBS	3,650	Awangku Zaidi Pangiran Muhamad	WARISAN	2,859	364	Matbali Musah (PN-BERSATU)
N34	Lumadan	Ruslan Muharam	PBS	3,650	Malik Unsa	PCS	231	364	Matbali Musah (PN-BERSATU)
N34	Lumadan	Ruslan Muharam	PBS	3,650	Sahlih Sirin	GAGASAN	44	364	Matbali Musah (PN-BERSATU)
N34	Lumadan	Ruslan Muharam	PBS	3,650	Ali Dad Fazal Elahi	USNO	254	364	Matbali Musah (PN-BERSATU)
N34	Lumadan	Ruslan Muharam	PBS	3,650	Johari Mohd Dun	PPRS	135	364	Matbali Musah (PN-BERSATU)
N34	Lumadan	Ruslan Muharam	PBS	3,650	Mohd Saidi Manan	IND	46	364	Matbali Musah (PN-BERSATU)
N35	Sindumin	Yusof Yacob	WARISAN	5,415					
N35	Sindumin	Yusof Yacob	WARISAN	5,415	Daniel Gaing @ George Daniel	LDP	142	424	Yusof Yacob (WARISAN)
N35	Sindumin	Yusof Yacob	WARISAN	5,415	Jaby Guairi	PCS	114	424	Yusof Yacob (WARISAN)
N35	Sindumin	Yusof Yacob	WARISAN	5,415	Arifin Harith	GAGASAN	34	424	Yusof Yacob (WARISAN)
N35	Sindumin	Yusof Yacob	WARISAN	5,415	Manshur @ Manshor Okk Mohd Yassin	USNO	365	424	Yusof Yacob (WARISAN)
N35	Sindumin	Yusof Yacob	WARISAN	5,415	Sani Miasin	BN-UMNO	4,991	424	Yusof Yacob (WARISAN)
N36	Kundasang	Joachim Gunsalam	PBS	4,332					
N36	Kundasang	Joachim Gunsalam	PBS	4,332	Ewon Ebin	PCS	2,384	1,422	Joachim Gunsalam (GBS-PBS)
N36	Kundasang	Joachim Gunsalam	PBS	4,332	Osman Marajin	GAGASAN	75	1,422	Joachim Gunsalam (GBS-PBS)
N36	Kundasang	Joachim Gunsalam	PBS	4,332	Jeafry Goh Kautah	LDP	293	1,422	Joachim Gunsalam (GBS-PBS)
N36	Kundasang	Joachim Gunsalam	PBS	4,332	Siriman @ Mohd. Fazid Basir	WARISAN	2,910	1,422	Joachim Gunsalam (GBS-PBS)
N37	Karanaan	Masidi Manjun	PN-BERSATU	6,696					
N37	Karanaan	Masidi Manjun	PN-BERSATU	6,696	Md Tajuddin Sadi	USNO	74	4,814	Masidi Manjun (PN-BERSATU)
N37	Karanaan	Masidi Manjun	PN-BERSATU	6,696	Awasi Ganie @ Yasin Abdul Ghani	WARISAN	1,882	4,814	Masidi Manjun (PN-BERSATU)
N37	Karanaan	Masidi Manjun	PN-BERSATU	6,696	Muhamad Hazrul Masnin	PCS	434	4,814	Masidi Manjun (PN-BERSATU)
N38	Paginatan	Abidin Madingkir	PN-STAR	3,783					
N38	Paginatan	Abidin Madingkir	PN-STAR	3,783	Georgina L. George	UPKO	1,245	1,323	Abidin Madingkir (PN-STAR)
N38	Paginatan	Abidin Madingkir	PN-STAR	3,783	Amru Abdul Kadir	PCS	905	1,323	Abidin Madingkir (PN-STAR)
N38	Paginatan	Abidin Madingkir	PN-STAR	3,783	Arthur Sen Siong Choo @ Sin Siong Chooi	PBS	1588	1,323	Abidin Madingkir (PN-STAR)
N38	Paginatan	Abidin Madingkir	PN-STAR	3,783	Liong Siu Min @ Siu Min bin Limatok	LDP	118	1,323	Abidin Madingkir (PN-STAR)
N38	Paginatan	Abidin Madingkir	PN-STAR	3,783	Henrynus Amin	ANAK NEGERI	349	1,323	Abidin Madingkir (PN-STAR)
N38	Paginatan	Abidin Madingkir	PN-STAR	3,783	Bensin @ Binsin Dani	GAGASAN	52	1,323	Abidin Madingkir (PN-STAR)
N38	Paginatan	Abidin Madingkir	PN-STAR	3,783	Junaidi Sahat	BN-UMNO	2,460	1,323	Abidin Madingkir (PN-STAR)
N38	Paginatan	Abidin Madingkir	PN-STAR	3,783	Kamil Kasibun	USNO	112	1,323	Abidin Madingkir (PN-STAR)
N39	Tambunan	Jeffrey Kitingan	PN-STAR	8,691					
N39	Tambunan	Jeffrey Kitingan	PN-STAR	8,691	Nayan Yambu @ Laurentius	UPKO	1,899	6,792	Jeffrey Kitingan (PN-STAR)
N39	Tambunan	Jeffrey Kitingan	PN-STAR	8,691	Damian Richard Marcus	PCS	326	6,792	Jeffrey Kitingan (PN-STAR)
N39	Tambunan	Jeffrey Kitingan	PN-STAR	8,691	Silverius Bruno	PBS	439	6,792	Jeffrey Kitingan (PN-STAR)
N39	Tambunan	Jeffrey Kitingan	PN-STAR	8,691	Nordin Jaini @ Zaini	GAGASAN	140	6,792	Jeffrey Kitingan (PN-STAR)
N39	Tambunan	Jeffrey Kitingan	PN-STAR	8,691	Jimmy Palikat	IND	60	6,792	Jeffrey Kitingan (PN-STAR)
N40	Bingkor	Robert Tawik	PN-STAR	7,891					
N40	Bingkor	Robert Tawik	PN-STAR	7,891	Julius Favianus	LDP	210	5,070	Robert Nordin (PN-STAR)
N40	Bingkor	Robert Tawik	PN-STAR	7,891	Alfonsos Ifilix	PCS	447	5,070	Robert Nordin (PN-STAR)
N40	Bingkor	Robert Tawik	PN-STAR	7,891	Engah Sintan @ Dahlan Abdullah	USNO	104	5,070	Robert Nordin (PN-STAR)
N40	Bingkor	Robert Tawik	PN-STAR	7,891	Peter Jino Allion	PBS	298	5,070	Robert Nordin (PN-STAR)
N40	Bingkor	Robert Tawik	PN-STAR	7,891	Odom @ Peter Dhoms Saili @ Soili	WARISAN	2,821	5,070	Robert Nordin (PN-STAR)
N41	Liawan	Annuar Ayub Aman	PN-STAR	4,628					
N41	Liawan	Annuar Ayub Aman	PN-STAR	4,628	Yatin Kunkung	LDP	45	641	Rasinin Kautis (WARISAN)
N41	Liawan	Annuar Ayub Aman	PN-STAR	4,628	Daniel Kinsik	PBS	1,084	641	Rasinin Kautis (WARISAN)
N41	Liawan	Annuar Ayub Aman	PN-STAR	4,628	Leong Chau Chu	USNO	43	641	Rasinin Kautis (WARISAN)
N41	Liawan	Annuar Ayub Aman	PN-STAR	4,628	Rasinin Kautis	PH-DAP	3,987	641	Rasinin Kautis (WARISAN)
N41	Liawan	Annuar Ayub Aman	PN-STAR	4,628	Mazlan Latif	PCS	209	641	Rasinin Kautis (WARISAN)
N41	Liawan	Annuar Ayub Aman	PN-STAR	4,628	Jake Nointin	IND	1,835	641	Rasinin Kautis (WARISAN)
N42	Melalap	Peter Anthony	WARISAN	5.245					
N42	Melalap	Peter Anthony	WARISAN	5.245	Sazali Justi	USNO	32	1,719	Peter Anthony (WARISAN)
N42	Melalap	Peter Anthony	WARISAN	5.245	Masdin Tumas	LDP	23	1,719	Peter Anthony (WARISAN)
N42	Melalap	Peter Anthony	WARISAN	5.245	Afiah Sausun	PCS	268	1,719	Peter Anthony (WARISAN)
N42	Melalap	Peter Anthony	WARISAN	5.245	Jamawi Ja’afar	BN-UMNO	3,526	1,719	Peter Anthony (WARISAN)
N42	Melalap	Peter Anthony	WARISAN	5.245	Radin Maleh	PBS	1,359	1,719	Peter Anthony (WARISAN)
N43	Kemabong	Rubin Balang	IND	4,214					
N43	Kemabong	Rubin Balang	IND	4,214	Lucas Umbul	UPKO	3,202	1,012	Jamawi Ja'afar (BN-UMNO)
N43	Kemabong	Rubin Balang	IND	4,214	Teh Jin Keong	PCS	229	1,012	Jamawi Ja'afar (BN-UMNO)
N43	Kemabong	Rubin Balang	IND	4,214	Raime Unggi	BN-UMNO	2,966	1,012	Jamawi Ja'afar (BN-UMNO)
N43	Kemabong	Rubin Balang	IND	4,214	Juster Peter	LDP	268	1,012	Jamawi Ja'afar (BN-UMNO)
N43	Kemabong	Rubin Balang	IND	4,214	Rainus Sagulau	USNO	73	1,012	Jamawi Ja'afar (BN-UMNO)
N44	Tulid	Flovia Ng	PN-STAR	2,267					
N44	Tulid	Flovia Ng	PN-STAR	2,267	Matusin Bowie @ Matius	BN-PBRS	1,723	544	New seat
N44	Tulid	Flovia Ng	PN-STAR	2,267	Mohamad Khairy Abdullah	USNO	69	544	New seat
N44	Tulid	Flovia Ng	PN-STAR	2,267	Suman Yasambun	PBS	720	544	New seat
N44	Tulid	Flovia Ng	PN-STAR	2,267	Mudi Dubing	WARISAN	1,589	544	New seat
N44	Tulid	Flovia Ng	PN-STAR	2,267	Dahalan @ Ulin Abdullah @ Amil	LDP	52	544	New seat
N44	Tulid	Flovia Ng	PN-STAR	2,267	Matusi Timam	PCS	356	544	New seat
N45	Sook	Ellron Alfred Angin	PN-STAR	3,554					
N45	Sook	Ellron Alfred Angin	PN-STAR	3,554	Bonepes Been	BN-UMNO	1,535	1,232	Ellron Alfred Angin (PN-STAR)
N45	Sook	Ellron Alfred Angin	PN-STAR	3,554	Raymond Ahuar	PH-PKR	2,322	1,232	Ellron Alfred Angin (PN-STAR)
N45	Sook	Ellron Alfred Angin	PN-STAR	3,554	Aning Ansawang	LDP	110	1,232	Ellron Alfred Angin (PN-STAR)
N45	Sook	Ellron Alfred Angin	PN-STAR	3,554	Rebecca Taimin	PCS	88	1,232	Ellron Alfred Angin (PN-STAR)
N46	Nabawan	Abdul Ghani Mohamed Yassin	PN-BERSATU	4,688					
N46	Nabawan	Abdul Ghani Mohamed Yassin	PN-BERSATU	4,688	Ampalus Robert Sanaron	PCS	1,115	2,238	Bobbey Ah Fang Suan (PN-BERSATU)
N46	Nabawan	Abdul Ghani Mohamed Yassin	PN-BERSATU	4,688	Albert Aguir	UPKO	2,450	2,238	Bobbey Ah Fang Suan (PN-BERSATU)
N46	Nabawan	Abdul Ghani Mohamed Yassin	PN-BERSATU	4,688	Maikol Ampuas	IND	128	2,238	Bobbey Ah Fang Suan (PN-BERSATU)
N47	Telupid	Jonnybone Kurum	PBS	2,266					
N47	Telupid	Jonnybone Kurum	PBS	2,266	Takun Ladas @ Mohd Johan Sulan Madinal	LDP	54	685	New seat
N47	Telupid	Jonnybone Kurum	PBS	2,266	Jingkoi Luna	PCS	68	685	New seat
N47	Telupid	Jonnybone Kurum	PBS	2,266	Felix Joseph Sitin	UPKO	1,581	685	New seat
N47	Telupid	Jonnybone Kurum	PBS	2,266	Abdul Wahab Abdul Gani	BN-UMNO	1,389	685	New seat
N48	Sugut	James Ratib	BN-UMNO	4,308					
N48	Sugut	James Ratib	BN-UMNO	4,308	Razak Allexsius Kontuni	LDP	178	1,664	James Ratib (BN-UMNO)
N48	Sugut	James Ratib	BN-UMNO	4,308	Raimon Lanjat	PCS	124	1,664	James Ratib (BN-UMNO)
N48	Sugut	James Ratib	BN-UMNO	4,308	Jubin Tulawi	USNO	38	1,664	James Ratib (BN-UMNO)
N48	Sugut	James Ratib	BN-UMNO	4,308	Kamaruddin Jamil	PPRS	86	1,664	James Ratib (BN-UMNO)
N48	Sugut	James Ratib	BN-UMNO	4,308	Nor Sabrina Japar	WARISAN	2,644	1,664	James Ratib (BN-UMNO)
N48	Sugut	James Ratib	BN-UMNO	4,308	Undang Jalang	IND	65	1,664	James Ratib (BN-UMNO)
N49	Labuk	Samad Jambri	PN-BERSATU	2,701					
N49	Labuk	Samad Jambri	PN-BERSATU	2,701	Dennis Tweening Rantau	UPKO	1,493	1,208	Abd. Rahman Kongkawang (IND)
N49	Labuk	Samad Jambri	PN-BERSATU	2,701	Sh Suhaimi Sh Miasin	USNO	108	1,208	Abd. Rahman Kongkawang (IND)
N49	Labuk	Samad Jambri	PN-BERSATU	2,701	Edelis K Micheal	PCS	115	1,208	Abd. Rahman Kongkawang (IND)
N49	Labuk	Samad Jambri	PN-BERSATU	2,701	Abd. Rahman Kongkawang	IND	1,441	1,208	Abd. Rahman Kongkawang (IND)
N50	Gum-Gum	Arunarsin Taib	WARISAN	3,140					
N50	Gum-Gum	Arunarsin Taib	WARISAN	3,140	Riduan Sampai	PPRS	23	269	Arunarsin Taib (WARISAN)
N50	Gum-Gum	Arunarsin Taib	WARISAN	3,140	Suhaimi Nasir	BN-UMNO	2,871	269	Arunarsin Taib (WARISAN)
N50	Gum-Gum	Arunarsin Taib	WARISAN	3,140	Undam Tompom	PCS	172	269	Arunarsin Taib (WARISAN)
N50	Gum-Gum	Arunarsin Taib	WARISAN	3,140	Jainudin Berahim	LDP	113	269	Arunarsin Taib (WARISAN)
N50	Gum-Gum	Arunarsin Taib	WARISAN	3,140	Yunus Nordin	IND	1,690	269	Arunarsin Taib (WARISAN)
N51	Sungai Manila	Mokran Ingkat	BN-UMNO	4,585					
N51	Sungai Manila	Mokran Ingkat	BN-UMNO	4,585	Mahmud Sudin	WARISAN	3,168	1,417	New seat
N51	Sungai Manila	Mokran Ingkat	BN-UMNO	4,585	Mohd Arshad Abdul	PPRS	90	1,417	New seat
N51	Sungai Manila	Mokran Ingkat	BN-UMNO	4,585	Sahizan Awang Sharif	PCS	191	1,417	New seat
N51	Sungai Manila	Mokran Ingkat	BN-UMNO	4,585	Md Anuar Md Yusuf	LDP	100	1,417	New seat
N51	Sungai Manila	Mokran Ingkat	BN-UMNO	4,585	K Zulkipli @ K Zulkifli Harrith	USNO	111	1,417	New seat
N52	Sungai Sibuga	Mohamad Hamsan Awang Supain	BN-UMNO	7,545					
N52	Sungai Sibuga	Mohamad Hamsan Awang Supain	BN-UMNO	7,545	Armani Mahiruddin	WARISAN	6,007	1,538	Musa Aman (BN-UMNO)
N52	Sungai Sibuga	Mohamad Hamsan Awang Supain	BN-UMNO	7,545	Erwan Syah	PCS	526	1,538	Musa Aman (BN-UMNO)
N52	Sungai Sibuga	Mohamad Hamsan Awang Supain	BN-UMNO	7,545	Kemellia Hasan	LDP	126	1,538	Musa Aman (BN-UMNO)
N52	Sungai Sibuga	Mohamad Hamsan Awang Supain	BN-UMNO	7,545	Mohd Jain Aliuddin	PPRS	114	1,538	Musa Aman (BN-UMNO)
N53	Sekong	Alias Sani	WARISAN	5,937					
N53	Sekong	Alias Sani	WARISAN	5,937	Abidin Sukor	PPRS	87	1,599	Arifin Asgali (WARISAN)
N53	Sekong	Alias Sani	WARISAN	5,937	Siaran Jumdail	USNO	63	1,599	Arifin Asgali (WARISAN)
N53	Sekong	Alias Sani	WARISAN	5,937	Hazulizah Mohd Dani	BN-UMNO	4,338	1,599	Arifin Asgali (WARISAN)
N53	Sekong	Alias Sani	WARISAN	5,937	Mohd Fazil Ajak	LDP	102	1,599	Arifin Asgali (WARISAN)
N53	Sekong	Alias Sani	WARISAN	5,937	Noraini Biting	PCS	253	1,599	Arifin Asgali (WARISAN)
N54	Karamunting	George Hiew Vun Zin	WARISAN	5,694					
N54	Karamunting	George Hiew Vun Zin	WARISAN	5,694	Chew Kok Woh	BN-MCA	3,215	2,479	George Hiew Vun Zin (WARISAN)
N54	Karamunting	George Hiew Vun Zin	WARISAN	5,694	Rachel Singh Chal	USNO	306	2,479	George Hiew Vun Zin (WARISAN)
N54	Karamunting	George Hiew Vun Zin	WARISAN	5,694	Kong Nyuk Thou	PBS	235	2,479	George Hiew Vun Zin (WARISAN)
N54	Karamunting	George Hiew Vun Zin	WARISAN	5,694	Lee Tiang Yong @ Lee Chee Ui	PPRS	30	2,479	George Hiew Vun Zin (WARISAN)
N54	Karamunting	George Hiew Vun Zin	WARISAN	5,694	Alvis Loo	PCS	81	2,479	George Hiew Vun Zin (WARISAN)
N54	Karamunting	George Hiew Vun Zin	WARISAN	5,694	Ha Cheun Hoo	LDP	'129	2,479	George Hiew Vun Zin (WARISAN)
N55	Elopura	Calvin Chong Ket Kiun	PH-DAP	10,871					
N55	Elopura	Calvin Chong Ket Kiun	PH-DAP	10,871	Chan Boon Thian	BN-MCA	3,188	7,683	Calvin Chong Ket Kiun (PH-DAP)
N55	Elopura	Calvin Chong Ket Kiun	PH-DAP	10,871	Khairah @ Siti Khairiah S Mohd	USNO	224	7,683	Calvin Chong Ket Kiun (PH-DAP)
N55	Elopura	Calvin Chong Ket Kiun	PH-DAP	10,871	Mohamad Saini Ahmad Tang	PPRS	93	7,683	Calvin Chong Ket Kiun (PH-DAP)
N55	Elopura	Calvin Chong Ket Kiun	PH-DAP	10,871	Voo Min Jin	PCS	167	7,683	Calvin Chong Ket Kiun (PH-DAP)
N55	Elopura	Calvin Chong Ket Kiun	PH-DAP	10,871	Robert Chong	LDP	226	7,683	Calvin Chong Ket Kiun (PH-DAP)
N56	Tanjong Papat	Frankie Poon Ming Fung	PH-DAP	5,900					
N56	Tanjong Papat	Frankie Poon Ming Fung	PH-DAP	5,900	Yoo Sing Chong	PCS	79	3,743	Frankie Poon Ming Fung (PH-DAP)
N56	Tanjong Papat	Frankie Poon Ming Fung	PH-DAP	5,900	Lam Jin Dak	LDP	62	3,743	Frankie Poon Ming Fung (PH-DAP)
N56	Tanjong Papat	Frankie Poon Ming Fung	PH-DAP	5,900	Jamal Ali	PPRS	35	3,743	Frankie Poon Ming Fung (PH-DAP)
N56	Tanjong Papat	Frankie Poon Ming Fung	PH-DAP	5,900	Yong Chie Man	PN-SAPP	2,187	3,743	Frankie Poon Ming Fung (PH-DAP)
N56	Tanjong Papat	Frankie Poon Ming Fung	PH-DAP	5,900	Mohd Yunus Apil	USNO	345	3,743	Frankie Poon Ming Fung (PH-DAP)
N56	Tanjong Papat	Frankie Poon Ming Fung	PH-DAP	5,900	Noraini Sulong	IND	98	3,743	Frankie Poon Ming Fung (PH-DAP)
N57	Kuamut	Masiung Banah	IND	2,802					
N57	Kuamut	Masiung Banah	IND	2,802	Ationg Tituh	GAGASAN	270	978	Masiung Banah (IND)
N57	Kuamut	Masiung Banah	IND	2,802	Juhari Janan	BN-UMNO	1,547	978	Masiung Banah (IND)
N57	Kuamut	Masiung Banah	IND	2,802	Benson Inggam	UPKO	1,824	978	Masiung Banah (IND)
N57	Kuamut	Masiung Banah	IND	2,802	Muhamad Mezsi Eng Abdullah	PCS	721	978	Masiung Banah (IND)
N58	Lamag	Bung Moktar Radin	BN-UMNO	3,035					
N58	Lamag	Bung Moktar Radin	BN-UMNO	3,035	Mohd Al Ruzaine @ Sairin Abdul Rahman	PPRS	61	661	New seat
N58	Lamag	Bung Moktar Radin	BN-UMNO	3,035	Mohd. Ismail Ayob	WARISAN	2,374	661	New seat
N58	Lamag	Bung Moktar Radin	BN-UMNO	3,035	Razman Mayan	PCS	71	661	New seat
N58	Lamag	Bung Moktar Radin	BN-UMNO	3,035	Junny @ Karuak Abdullah	IND	73	661	New seat
N59	Sukau	Jafry Ariffin	BN-UMNO	3,763					
N59	Sukau	Jafry Ariffin	BN-UMNO	3,763	Jakariah Janit	GAGASAN	41	2,129	Saddi Abdul Rahman (IND)
N59	Sukau	Jafry Ariffin	BN-UMNO	3,763	Amrah Liwangsa	WARISAN	1,634	2,129	Saddi Abdul Rahman (IND)
N59	Sukau	Jafry Ariffin	BN-UMNO	3,763	Malaya Kasura	PCS	94	2,129	Saddi Abdul Rahman (IND)
N59	Sukau	Jafry Ariffin	BN-UMNO	3,763	Saddi Abdul Rahman	IND	1,228	2,129	Saddi Abdul Rahman (IND)
N60	Tungku	Assaffal P. Alian	WARISAN	3,792					
N60	Tungku	Assaffal P. Alian	WARISAN	3,792	Jani Kulmim	PCS	142	268	Assaffal P. Alian (WARISAN)
N60	Tungku	Assaffal P. Alian	WARISAN	3,792	Amil Bangsa Amil Ahsan	PKS	24	268	Assaffal P. Alian (WARISAN)
N60	Tungku	Assaffal P. Alian	WARISAN	3,792	Mohammad Sidam	USNO	79	268	Assaffal P. Alian (WARISAN)
N60	Tungku	Assaffal P. Alian	WARISAN	3,792	Abdul Momen Anchai	BN-UMNO	3,524	268	Assaffal P. Alian (WARISAN)
N60	Tungku	Assaffal P. Alian	WARISAN	3,792	Jumaat Anwar	IND	154	268	Assaffal P. Alian (WARISAN)
N61	Segama	Mohammadin Ketapi	WARISAN	4,864					
N61	Segama	Mohammadin Ketapi	WARISAN	4,864	Nicholas Voo Vune Kett	LDP LDP	67	2,168	New seat
N61	Segama	Mohammadin Ketapi	WARISAN	4,864	Jikamisah Abdul Salam	USNO	39	2,168	New seat
N61	Segama	Mohammadin Ketapi	WARISAN	4,864	Sahidin Rabaha	PPRS	399	2,168	New seat
N61	Segama	Mohammadin Ketapi	WARISAN	4,864	Aljen Johny	PN-BERSATU	2,696	2,168	New seat
N61	Segama	Mohammadin Ketapi	WARISAN	4,864	Kamarudin Cini	PCS	570	2,168	New seat
N61	Segama	Mohammadin Ketapi	WARISAN	4,864	Mohd Basri Abdul Gapar	GAGASAN	135	2,168	New seat
N61	Segama	Mohammadin Ketapi	WARISAN	4,864	Kamis Burhan	IND	510	2,168	New seat
N62	Silam (previously known as Lahad Datu)	Dumi Pg. Masdal	WARISAN	5,200					
N62	Silam (previously known as Lahad Datu)	Dumi Pg. Masdal	WARISAN	5,200	Erwan Johan	PPRS	156	1,542	Dumi Masdal (WARISAN)
N62	Silam (previously known as Lahad Datu)	Dumi Pg. Masdal	WARISAN	5,200	Abd Hakim Gulam Hassan	PN-BERSATU	3,658	1,542	Dumi Masdal (WARISAN)
N62	Silam (previously known as Lahad Datu)	Dumi Pg. Masdal	WARISAN	5,200	Mohammad Hamdan Abdullah	USNO	54	1,542	Dumi Masdal (WARISAN)
N62	Silam (previously known as Lahad Datu)	Dumi Pg. Masdal	WARISAN	5,200	Matusin Susa	PCS	196	1,542	Dumi Masdal (WARISAN)
N62	Silam (previously known as Lahad Datu)	Dumi Pg. Masdal	WARISAN	5,200	Ahmad Tiong	GAGASAN	122	1,542	Dumi Masdal (WARISAN)
N63	Kunak	Norazlinah Arif	WARISAN	3,861					
N63	Kunak	Norazlinah Arif	WARISAN	3,861	Halid Harun	BN-UMNO	3,272	589	Norazlinah Arif (WARISAN)
N63	Kunak	Norazlinah Arif	WARISAN	3,861	Absul Samat Asiman	PCS	77	589	Norazlinah Arif (WARISAN)
N63	Kunak	Norazlinah Arif	WARISAN	3,861	Hasbi Sariat	GAGASAN	290	589	Norazlinah Arif (WARISAN)
N63	Kunak	Norazlinah Arif	WARISAN	3,861	Otoh Joehann Angkie	USNO	32	589	Norazlinah Arif (WARISAN)
N63	Kunak	Norazlinah Arif	WARISAN	3,861	Nur Aini Abdul Rahman	LDP	404	589	Norazlinah Arif (WARISAN)
N64	Sulabayan	Jaujan Sambakong	WARISAN	5,747					
N64	Sulabayan	Jaujan Sambakong	WARISAN	5,747	Alapudin Muhd Sarap	PCS	75	3,245	Jaujan Sambakong (WARISAN)
N64	Sulabayan	Jaujan Sambakong	WARISAN	5,747	Abdul Manan Indanan	BN-UMNO	2,502	3,245	Jaujan Sambakong (WARISAN)
N65	Senallang	Shafie Apdal	WARISAN	6,363					
N65	Senallang	Shafie Apdal	WARISAN	6,363	Norazman Utoh Naim	PN-BERSATU	1,732	4,631	Mohd. Shafie Apdal (WARISAN)
N65	Senallang	Shafie Apdal	WARISAN	6,363	PG Ahmad Datuk Ali Alam	PPRS	39	4,631	Mohd. Shafie Apdal (WARISAN)
N65	Senallang	Shafie Apdal	WARISAN	6,363	Mohammad Ramzan Abdu Wahab	USNO	61	4,631	Mohd. Shafie Apdal (WARISAN)
N65	Senallang	Shafie Apdal	WARISAN	6,363	Mat Jais Lais	PCS	51	4,631	Mohd. Shafie Apdal (WARISAN)
N66	Bugaya	Manis Muka Mohd Darah	WARISAN	8,557					
N66	Bugaya	Manis Muka Mohd Darah	WARISAN	8,557	Mohd Daud Tampakong	PN-BERSATU	2,552	6,005	Manis Buka Mohd. Darah (WARISAN)
N66	Bugaya	Manis Muka Mohd Darah	WARISAN	8,557	Taraji Jamdi	PPRS	49	6,005	Manis Buka Mohd. Darah (WARISAN)
N66	Bugaya	Manis Muka Mohd Darah	WARISAN	8,557	Ahmad Kenajaan	USNO	99	6,005	Manis Buka Mohd. Darah (WARISAN)
N66	Bugaya	Manis Muka Mohd Darah	WARISAN	8,557	Jilin Mesat	PCS	115	6,005	Manis Buka Mohd. Darah (WARISAN)
N66	Bugaya	Manis Muka Mohd Darah	WARISAN	8,557	Abdul Jan Muammil	IND	31	6,005	Manis Buka Mohd. Darah (WARISAN)
N66	Bugaya	Manis Muka Mohd Darah	WARISAN	8,557	Rasidan Abdul Latiff	IND	92	6,005	Manis Buka Mohd. Darah (WARISAN)
N67	Balung	Hamid Awang	BN-UMNO	3,524					
N67	Balung	Hamid Awang	BN-UMNO	3,524	Labosa @ Ghazali Jakian	USNO	33	580	Osman Jamal (WARISAN)
N67	Balung	Hamid Awang	BN-UMNO	3,524	Arifin Kassim	HR	1,213	580	Osman Jamal (WARISAN)
N67	Balung	Hamid Awang	BN-UMNO	3,524	Abu Bakar Jambuan @ Omar	GAGASAN	26	580	Osman Jamal (WARISAN)
N67	Balung	Hamid Awang	BN-UMNO	3,524	Andi Rus Diana Andi Paladjareng	WARISAN	2,944	580	Osman Jamal (WARISAN)
N67	Balung	Hamid Awang	BN-UMNO	3,524	Abdul Hanim Damang	PCS	110	580	Osman Jamal (WARISAN)
N67	Balung	Hamid Awang	BN-UMNO	3,524	Cyril Aloysius	LDP	67	580	Osman Jamal (WARISAN)
N68	Apas	Nizam Abu Bakar Titingan	PN-BERSATU	6,252					
N68	Apas	Nizam Abu Bakar Titingan	PN-BERSATU	6,252	Datu Indal Datu Ismail	PCS	186	2,049	Nizam Abu Bakar Titingan (PN-BERSATU)
N68	Apas	Nizam Abu Bakar Titingan	PN-BERSATU	6,252	Muhd Sayardi Bakal	USNO	83	2,049	Nizam Abu Bakar Titingan (PN-BERSATU)
N68	Apas	Nizam Abu Bakar Titingan	PN-BERSATU	6,252	Amrullah Kamal	WARISAN	4,203	2,049	Nizam Abu Bakar Titingan (PN-BERSATU)
N69	Sri Tanjong	Justin Wong Yung Bin	PH-DAP	11,150					
N69	Sri Tanjong	Justin Wong Yung Bin	PH-DAP	11,150	Ricky Phang Siau Chern	PPRS	46	8,880	Wong Sze Phin (PH-DAP)
N69	Sri Tanjong	Justin Wong Yung Bin	PH-DAP	11,150	Lim Thing Khai	LDP	276	8,880	Wong Sze Phin (PH-DAP)
N69	Sri Tanjong	Justin Wong Yung Bin	PH-DAP	11,150	Fung Lin Fun	PN-BERSATU	2,270	8,880	Wong Sze Phin (PH-DAP)
N69	Sri Tanjong	Justin Wong Yung Bin	PH-DAP	11,150	Yapp Yin Hoau	HR	568	8,880	Wong Sze Phin (PH-DAP)
N69	Sri Tanjong	Justin Wong Yung Bin	PH-DAP	11,150	Wong Su Vui	GAGASAN	117	8,880	Wong Sze Phin (PH-DAP)
N69	Sri Tanjong	Justin Wong Yung Bin	PH-DAP	11,150	Ken Poh	PCS	80	8,880	Wong Sze Phin (PH-DAP)
N69	Sri Tanjong	Justin Wong Yung Bin	PH-DAP	11,150	Chung Yaw Hui	IND	52	8,880	Wong Sze Phin (PH-DAP)
N70	Kukusan	Rina Jainal	WARISAN	2,834					
N70	Kukusan	Rina Jainal	WARISAN	2,834	Chaya Sulaiman	BN-UMNO	2,824	10	New seat
N70	Kukusan	Rina Jainal	WARISAN	2,834	Ismail Idris	USNO	80	10	New seat
N70	Kukusan	Rina Jainal	WARISAN	2,834	Rosdina Mohd Noor	PPRS	34	10	New seat
N70	Kukusan	Rina Jainal	WARISAN	2,834	Wong Jin Soon	HR	796	10	New seat
N70	Kukusan	Rina Jainal	WARISAN	2,834	Lee Boon King	GAGASAN	21	10	New seat
N70	Kukusan	Rina Jainal	WARISAN	2,834	Ismail @ Taufiq Muin	PCS	75	10	New seat
N71	Tanjung Batu (previously known as Tanjong Batu)	Andi Muhammad Suryady Bandy	BN-UMNO	4,728					
N71	Tanjung Batu (previously known as Tanjong Batu)	Andi Muhammad Suryady Bandy	BN-UMNO	4,728	Zulkifli Ahmad	USNO	58	2,123	Hamisa Samat (IND)
N71	Tanjung Batu (previously known as Tanjong Batu)	Andi Muhammad Suryady Bandy	BN-UMNO	4,728	Mohd. Afsar Abd. Latif	WARISAN	2,605	2,123	Hamisa Samat (IND)
N71	Tanjung Batu (previously known as Tanjong Batu)	Andi Muhammad Suryady Bandy	BN-UMNO	4,728	Rudy Ludin	PCS	130	2,123	Hamisa Samat (IND)
N71	Tanjung Batu (previously known as Tanjong Batu)	Andi Muhammad Suryady Bandy	BN-UMNO	4,728	Kamshari @ Johari Ibrahim	PPRS	79	2,123	Hamisa Samat (IND)
N71	Tanjung Batu (previously known as Tanjong Batu)	Andi Muhammad Suryady Bandy	BN-UMNO	4,728	Asmari @ Nas Udoh	IND	16	2,123	Hamisa Samat (IND)
N72	Merotai	Sarifuddin Hata	WARISAN	4,058					
N72	Merotai	Sarifuddin Hata	WARISAN	4,058	Shim Nyat Yun	LDP	30	1,587	Sarifuddin Hata (WARISAN)
N72	Merotai	Sarifuddin Hata	WARISAN	4,058	Hafeezatul Halimah Mohamad	USNO	60	1,587	Sarifuddin Hata (WARISAN)
N72	Merotai	Sarifuddin Hata	WARISAN	4,058	Abdullah Palili	PCS	86	1,587	Sarifuddin Hata (WARISAN)
N72	Merotai	Sarifuddin Hata	WARISAN	4,058	Liew Yun Fah	HR	1,779	1,587	Sarifuddin Hata (WARISAN)
N72	Merotai	Sarifuddin Hata	WARISAN	4,058	Mohamad Jalani Chachu	PN-BERSATU	2,471	1,587	Sarifuddin Hata (WARISAN)
N73	Sebatik	Hassan Abd. Ghani Pangiran Amir	WARISAN	2,665					
N73	Sebatik	Hassan Abd. Ghani Pangiran Amir	WARISAN	2,665	Baharuddin Basrie	PPRS	140	521	Abdul Muis Picho (PN-BERSATU)
N73	Sebatik	Hassan Abd. Ghani Pangiran Amir	WARISAN	2,665	Abdul Muis Picho	PN-BERSATU	2,143	521	Abdul Muis Picho (PN-BERSATU)
N73	Sebatik	Hassan Abd. Ghani Pangiran Amir	WARISAN	2,665	Hassan Ibrahim	USNO	253	521	Abdul Muis Picho (PN-BERSATU)
N73	Sebatik	Hassan Abd. Ghani Pangiran Amir	WARISAN	2,665	Abdul Samad Akoi	PCS	504	521	Abdul Muis Picho (PN-BERSATU)
N73	Sebatik	Hassan Abd. Ghani Pangiran Amir	WARISAN	2,665	Juhuran Kalmin	IND	90	521	Abdul Muis Picho (PN-BERSATU)
N73	Sebatik	Hassan Abd. Ghani Pangiran Amir	WARISAN	2,665	Mohd Balbir Arjan	IND	183	521	Abdul Muis Picho (PN-BERSATU)

https://lom.agc.gov.my/ilims/upload/portal/akta/outputp/pub_20200929_PUB484.pdf
