= Peter Anthony =

Malaysian politician, singer and businessman

Yang Berbahagia Datuk Peter Anthony PGDK

State Minister of Infrastructure Development of Sabah
- In office 16 May 2018 – 29 September 2020
- Governor: Juhar Mahiruddin
- Chief Minister: Shafie Apdal
- Assistant: Abdul Muis Picho
- Preceded by: Hajiji Noor
- Succeeded by: Bung Moktar Radin (State Minister of Works of Sabah)
- Constituency: Melalap

1st President of the Social Democratic Harmony Party
- In office 28 January 2022 – 7 March 2025
- Deputy: Juil Nuatim (non-Muslim bumiputera, 2022–2023); Wetrom Bahanda (Muslim bumiputera, October 2022–2025); Priscella Peter (non-Muslim bumiputera, 2023–2025)
- Preceded by: Position established
- Succeeded by: Priscella Peter

Member of the Sabah State Legislative Assembly for Melalap
- In office 9 May 2018 – 4 March 2025
- Preceded by: Radin Malleh (BN–PBS)
- Succeeded by: Jamawi Ja'afar (PH–PKR)
- Majority: 298 (2018); 1,719 (2020)

Faction represented in the Sabah State Legislative Assembly
- 2018–2021: Heritage Party
- 2021–2022: Independent
- 2022–2025: Social Democratic Harmony Party

Personal details
- Born: Peter Anthony; 24 February 1971 (age 55) Tenom, Sabah, Malaysia
- Party: WARISAN (2018–2021); Independent (2021–2022); KDM (since 2022)
- Children: Priscella Peter (daughter)
- Occupation: Politician; singer; businessman

Peter Anthony (born 24 February 1971) is a Malaysian politician, singer and businessman who served as the State Minister of Infrastructure Development of Sabah in the Heritage Party (WARISAN) state administration under former Chief Minister Shafie Apdal from May 2018 to the collapse of the WARISAN administration in September 2020 and Member of Sabah State Legislative Assembly (MLA) for Melalap from May 2018 to March 2025. He is also a founder of Asli Jati Engineering Sdn Bhd, a construction company involved in Universiti Malaysia Sabah tender scandal in 2014. He is a founder and member of the Social Democratic Harmony Party (KDM), a party that is aligned with the ruling Gabungan Rakyat Sabah (GRS) coalition. He also served as 1st and founding President of KDM from the founding of the party in January 2022 to March 2025. He was independent after leaving WARISAN on 28 December 2021 along with Limbahau MLA Juil Nuatim and before founding KDM on 28 January 2022. He was also the member and Vice President of WARISAN. He founded KDM, also a native based party in Tenom, Sabah on 28 January 2022 along with Juil.

== Controversies and issues ==
=== Scandal of document forgery ===
Peter, who was the Managing Director of Asli Jati Engineering Sendirian Berhad (Sdn Bhd), had forged a letter from the Officer of the Vice-Chancellor of Universiti Malaysia Sabah (UMS) on 9 June 2014. The letter contained false statements with the intent to deceive. The forged document was related to a contract for the maintenance and service of the mechanical and electrical (M & E) system of UMS. He was accused of committing this offence between 13 June 2014 and 21 August 2014, at the Office of the Prime Minister's Chief Private Secretary in Putrajaya. He was charged under Section 468 of the Penal Code, which carried a maximum penalty of 7 years in prison and a fine if convicted. In June 2022, he filed an appeal with the High Court to challenge the ruling of the Sessions Court on 26 May 2022. At that time, he was sentenced to 3 years in prison and fined RM 50,000, with an alternative of 15 months in jail if the fine was not paid. However, the High Court dismissed his appeal and upheld the original sentence on 18 April 2023. The next day, he filed an appeal with the Court of Appeal, but he had already paid the RM 50,000 fine earlier. On 4 March 2025, the Court of Appeal upheld the decision of the Sessions Court, where he was found guilty of document forgery. He began serving his sentence at the Kajang Prison immediately that day. Following that, he was disqualified as the Melalap MLA and lost the eligibility to contest in the 2025 Sabah state election. On 7 March 2025, Priscella Peter, daughter of Peter, founding member and Deputy President of KDM, was appointed the 2nd party president following a unanimous decision by the party supreme council. Her promotion to the presidency was to take over Peter, who had been imprisoned. She was assisted by the Member of Parliament (MP) for Kota Marudu and MLA for Bandau Wetrom Bahanda, who remained the party deputy president and election director. KDM Secretary-General Willie Jude said the move was part of the contingency plan of the party ahead of the 2025 Sabah state election.

== Election results ==
Sabah State Legislative Assembly
Year	Constituency	Candidate	Votes	Pct	Opponent(s)	Votes	Pct	Ballots cast	Majority	Turnout
2018	N35 Melalap	Peter Anthony (WARISAN)	5,010	46.81%	Radin Malleh (PBS)	4,717	44.08%	10,986	293	78.50%
2018	N35 Melalap	Peter Anthony (WARISAN)	5,010	46.81%	Jaineh Juata (STAR)	861	8.05%	10,986	293	78.50%
2018	N35 Melalap	Peter Anthony (WARISAN)	5,010	46.81%	Chinly Moniu (PCS)	69	0.64%	10,986	293	78.50%
2018	N35 Melalap	Peter Anthony (WARISAN)	5,010	46.81%	Lidos Rabih (PKS)	45	0.42%	10,986	293	78.50%
2020	N42 Melalap	Peter Anthony (WARISAN)	5,245	50.18%	Jamawi Ja'afar (UMNO)	3,526	33.73%	10,453	1,719	74.70%
2020	N42 Melalap	Peter Anthony (WARISAN)	5,245	50.18%	Radin Malleh (PBS)	1,359	13.00%	10,453	1,719	74.70%
2020	N42 Melalap	Peter Anthony (WARISAN)	5,245	50.18%	Apiang Sausun (PCS)	268	2.56%	10,453	1,719	74.70%
2020	N42 Melalap	Peter Anthony (WARISAN)	5,245	50.18%	Sazali Justi (USNO Baru)	32	0.31%	10,453	1,719	74.70%
2020	N42 Melalap	Peter Anthony (WARISAN)	5,245	50.18%	Masdin Tumas (LDP)	23	0.22%	10,453	1,719	74.70%

== Honours ==
- Sabah :
  - Commander of the Order of Kinabalu (PGDK) – Datuk (2018)
