= Juil Nuatim =

Malaysian politician (born 1959)

Yang Berhormat Datuk Juil Nuatim PGDK MLA

State Assistant Minister of Rural Development of Sabah
- Incumbent
- Assumed office 2 December 2025 Serving with Samad Jambri
- Governor: Musa Aman
- Chief Minister: Hajiji Noor
- Minister: Rubin Balang
- Preceded by: Ruddy Awah
- Constituency: Limbahau

Member of the Sabah State Legislative Assembly for Limbahau
- Incumbent
- Assumed office 26 September 2020
- Preceded by: Position established
- Majority: 2,523 (2020); 3,320 (2025)

1st Deputy President of the Social Democratic Harmony Party (Non-Muslim Bumiputera)
- In office 28 January 2022 – 21 May 2023 Serving with Wetrom Bahanda (Muslim Bumiputera)
- President: Peter Anthony
- Preceded by: Position established
- Succeeded by: Priscella Peter

Personal details
- Born: Juil bin Nuatim; 7 November 1960 (age 65) Papar, Crown Colony of North Borneo
- Party: United Sabah National Organisation (USNO) (before 1995); United Malays National Organisation (UMNO) (1995–2018); Heritage Party (WARISAN) (2018–2021); Independent (2021–2022); Social Democratic Harmony Party (KDM) (2022–2023); GRS Direct Member (GRS) (2023–2025); United Sabah Party (PBS) (since 2025)
- Other political affiliations: Gabungan Rakyat Sabah (GRS) (since 2023)
- Spouse: Veronica Huang
- Occupation: Politician

Juil Nuatim (born 7 November 1960) is a Malaysian politician who has served as the State Assistant Minister of Rural Development of Sabah in the Gabungan Rakyat Sabah (GRS) state administration under Chief Minister Hajiji Noor and Minister Rubin Balang since December 2025, as well as Member of the Sabah State Legislative Assembly for Limbahau since September 2020. He is a member of the United Sabah Party (PBS), a component party of the GRS and formerly a member of the Heritage Party (WARISAN) and the Social Democratic Harmony Party (KDM) where he served as the 1st and founding Deputy President of KDM for the non-Muslim Bumiputera quota from the party foundation in January 2022 to his resignation from the party in May 2023.

On 28 December 2021, he and together with Melalap MLA Peter Anthony left WARISAN and became independents. Exactly a month later on 28 January 2022, they founded KDM and became the 1st and founding party president and deputy president respectively. On 21 May 2023, he resigned from KDM. One day before "Anti-parties switching law" been approved in Sabah on 25 May 2023, he joined and officially become one of the direct members of Gabungan Rakyat Sabah (GRS).

== Election results ==
Sabah State Legislative Assembly
Year	Constituency	Candidate	Votes	Pct.	Opponent(s)	Votes	Pct.	Ballots cast	Majority	Turnout
2020	N27 Limbahau	Juil Nuatim (WARISAN)	5,194	56.10%	Johnny Mositun (PBS)	2,671	28.85%	9,258	2,523	72.67%
2020	N27 Limbahau	Juil Nuatim (WARISAN)	5,194	56.10%	Cornelius Frederick @ Michael Fj Sulip (LDP)	473	5.11%	9,258	2,523	72.67%
2020	N27 Limbahau	Juil Nuatim (WARISAN)	5,194	56.10%	Laurence Onjuman (IND)	354	3.82%	9,258	2,523	72.67%
2020	N27 Limbahau	Juil Nuatim (WARISAN)	5,194	56.10%	Aubrey G Sham (PCS)	249	2.69%	9,258	2,523	72.67%
2020	N27 Limbahau	Juil Nuatim (WARISAN)	5,194	56.10%	Pius Lokiom (IND)	64	0.69%	9,258	2,523	72.67%
2020	N27 Limbahau	Juil Nuatim (WARISAN)	5,194	56.10%	Susanna Jainim Jaris (USNO Baru)	54	0.58%	9,258	2,523	72.67%
2020	N27 Limbahau	Juil Nuatim (WARISAN)	5,194	56.10%	Evelyn June Charlie (GAGASAN)	34	0.37%	9,258	2,523	72.67%
2025	N27 Limbahau	Juil Nuatim (PBS)	6,444	43.36%	Nelson Wences Angang (UPKO)	3,124	21.02%	15,009	3,320	74.29%
2025	N27 Limbahau	Juil Nuatim (PBS)	6,444	43.36%	Roger @ Roy Valentine Amandus (WARISAN)	2,150	14.47%	15,009	3,320	74.29%
2025	N27 Limbahau	Juil Nuatim (PBS)	6,444	43.36%	Edward Dagul (SAPP)	1,585	10.67%	15,009	3,320	74.29%
2025	N27 Limbahau	Juil Nuatim (PBS)	6,444	43.36%	Malik Luman (KDM)	1,007	6.78%	15,009	3,320	74.29%
2025	N27 Limbahau	Juil Nuatim (PBS)	6,444	43.36%	Marcellus Tambud (IND)	257	1.73%	15,009	3,320	74.29%
2025	N27 Limbahau	Juil Nuatim (PBS)	6,444	43.36%	Adrian Alexander Malim (Sabah BERSATU)	189	1.27%	15,009	3,320	74.29%
2025	N27 Limbahau	Juil Nuatim (PBS)	6,444	43.36%	Joseph Philip Kulip (IMPIAN)	68	0.46%	15,009	3,320	74.29%
2025	N27 Limbahau	Juil Nuatim (PBS)	6,444	43.36%	Linda Beda Dunstan (IND)	37	0.25%	15,009	3,320	74.29%

== Honours ==
- Sabah
  - Commander of the Order of Kinabalu (PGDK) – Datuk (2012)
