= Maijol Mahap =

Malaysian politician

Yang Berhormat Datuk Maijol Mahap PGDK JSM ASDK KMN JP MLA

Sabah State Assistant Minister of Local Government and Housing
- Incumbent
- Assumed office 2 December 2025 Serving with Fairuz Renddan
- Governor: Musa Aman
- Chief Minister: Hajiji Noor
- Minister: Mohd Arifin Mohd Arif
- Preceded by: Isnin Aliasnih
- Constituency: Bandau

Member of the Sabah State Legislative Assembly for Bandau
- Incumbent
- Assumed office 29 November 2025
- Preceded by: Wetrom Bahanda (KDM)
- Majority: 244 (2025)

Senator Elected by the Sabah State Legislative Assembly
- In office 6 December 2006 – 8 December 2012 (lapse on 6–9 December 2009) Serving with Armani Mahiruddin (2006–2011); Kadzim M. Yahya (2011–2012)
- Monarchs: Sirajuddin (2006); Mizan Zainal Abidin (2006–2011); Abdul Halim (2011–2012)
- Prime Minister: Najib Razak
- Preceded by: Kalakau Untol
- Succeeded by: Lucas Umbul

Personal details
- Born: 9 April 1960 (age 66)
- Party: United Pasokmomogun Kadazandusun Murut Organisation (UPKO) (–2012); People's Justice Party (PKR) (2012–2016); Sabah People's Hope Party (PHRS) (2016–2019); Malaysian United Indigenous Party of Sabah (2019–2022); Parti Gagasan Rakyat Sabah (GAGASAN RAKYAT) (2023–2025); Independent (2025–present)
- Other political affiliations: Barisan Nasional (–2012); Pakatan Rakyat (2012–2016); Gabungan Rakyat Sabah (GRS) (2022–2025)
- Education: Universiti Teknologi MARA (Diploma of Public Administration); University of London (LLM); Lincoln's Inn (Barrister at Law)
- Profession: Lawyer

Maijol Mahap (born 9 April 1960) is a Malaysian politician who served as the State Assistant Minister of Local Government and Housing of Sabah since December 2025 in the Gabungan Rakyat Sabah (GRS) state administration under Chief Minister Hajiji Noor as well as Member of Sabah State Legislative Assembly for Bandau since November 2025. Prior to his appointment, he previously served as Senator from December 2009 to December 2012 and December 2006 to December 2009 representing Sabah.

== Election results ==
Parliament of Malaysia
Year	Constituency	Candidate	Votes	Pct	Opponent(s)	Votes	Pct	Ballots cast	Majority	Turnout
1999	P147 Bandau	Maijol Mahap (UPKO)	6,781	41.16%	Maximus Ongkili (PBS)	8,465	51.38%	16,474	1,684	65.66%
1999	P147 Bandau	Maijol Mahap (UPKO)	6,781	41.16%	Baintin Adun (IND)	1,228	7.45%	16,474	1,684	65.66%
2013	P168 Kota Marudu	Maijol Mahap (PKR)	14,326	44.53%	Maximus Ongkili (PBS)	15,168	47.16%	32,166	842	78.50%
2013	P168 Kota Marudu	Maijol Mahap (PKR)	14,326	44.53%	Majamis Timbong (STAR)	2,228	6.93%	32,166	842	78.50%
2013	P168 Kota Marudu	Maijol Mahap (PKR)	14,326	44.53%	Yuntau K. Kolod (SAPP)	444	1.38%	32,166	842	78.50%
2018	P168 Kota Marudu	Maijol Mahap (PHRS)	11,259	33.21%	Maximus Ongkili (PBS)	13,033	38.44%	33,906	1,774	74.95%
2018	P168 Kota Marudu	Maijol Mahap (PHRS)	11,259	33.21%	Barlus Mangabis (WARISAN)	7,113	20.98%	33,906	1,774	74.95%
2018	P168 Kota Marudu	Maijol Mahap (PHRS)	11,259	33.21%	Paul Porodong (PCS)	2,501	7.37%	33,906	1,774	74.95%

Sabah State Legislative Assembly
Year	Constituency	Candidate	Votes	Pct	Opponent(s)	Votes	Pct	Ballots cast	Majority	Turnout
2025	N06 Bandau	Maijol Mahap (IND)	3,996	22.78%	Redonah Bahanda (GAGASAN)	3,752	21.39%	17,966	244	65.59%
2025	N06 Bandau	Maijol Mahap (IND)	3,996	22.78%	Zaidi Jatil (PKR)	2,631	15.00%	17,966	244	65.59%
2025	N06 Bandau	Maijol Mahap (IND)	3,996	22.78%	Jaiping Minsu Lumindang (KDM)	2,471	14.09%	17,966	244	65.59%
2025	N06 Bandau	Maijol Mahap (IND)	3,996	22.78%	Rizam Abd Rahman (WARISAN)	1,613	9.20%	17,966	244	65.59%
2025	N06 Bandau	Maijol Mahap (IND)	3,996	22.78%	Shirewin D Patrick (STAR)	1,189	6.78%	17,966	244	65.59%
2025	N06 Bandau	Maijol Mahap (IND)	3,996	22.78%	Suzie Salapan (UPKO)	859	4.90%	17,966	244	65.59%
2025	N06 Bandau	Maijol Mahap (IND)	3,996	22.78%	Jolius Majawai (IND)	472	2.69%	17,966	244	65.59%
2025	N06 Bandau	Maijol Mahap (IND)	3,996	22.78%	Willey Lampaki (UMNO)	380	2.17%	17,966	244	65.59%
2025	N06 Bandau	Maijol Mahap (IND)	3,996	22.78%	Sauting Rabuyot (IMPIAN)	97	0.55%	17,966	244	65.59%
2025	N06 Bandau	Maijol Mahap (IND)	3,996	22.78%	Norman Tulang (ASPIRASI)	30	0.17%	17,966	244	65.59%
2025	N06 Bandau	Maijol Mahap (IND)	3,996	22.78%	Robbin Banati (PBK)	28	0.16%	17,966	244	65.59%
2025	N06 Bandau	Maijol Mahap (IND)	3,996	22.78%	Siti Haima Jailani (PKS)	24	0.14%	17,966	244	65.59%

== Honours ==
- Malaysia
  - Companion of the Order of Loyalty to the Crown of Malaysia (JSM) (2012)
  - Officer of the Order of the Defender of the Realm (KMN) (2007)
- Sabah
  - Commander of the Order of Kinabalu (PGDK) – Datuk (2008)
  - Companion of the Order of Kinabalu (ASDK) (2000)
  - Justice of the Peace (JP) (2005)
