= Kota Marudu (federal constituency) =

Federal constituency of Sabah, Malaysia

Kota Marudu (P168)
Sabah constituency

Federal constituency
- Legislature: Dewan Rakyat
- MP: Wetrom Bahanda; KDM
- Constituency created: 2003
- First contested: 2004
- Last contested: 2022

Demographics
- Population (2020): 99,998
- Electors (2025): 85,810
- Area (km²): 2,282
- Pop. density (per km²): 43.8

Kota Marudu is a federal constituency in Kudat Division (Kudat District and Kota Marudu District), Sabah, Malaysia, that has been represented in the Dewan Rakyat since 2004.

The federal constituency was created in the 2003 redistribution and is mandated to return a single member to the Dewan Rakyat under the first past the post voting system.

== Demographics ==
https://ge15.orientaldaily.com.my/seats/sabah/p

Ethnic breakdown of Kota Marudu's electorate as of 2022
1. Sabah Bumiputera (82.7%)
2. Malay-Muslim Bumiputera (10.1%)
3. Chinese (5.10%)
4. Other ethnicities (1.60%)

As of 2020, Kota Marudu has a population of 99,998 people.

Age breakdown of Kota Marudu's electorate as of 2022
1. 18-20 (8.18%)
2. 21-29 (25.5%)
3. 30-39 (25.4%)
4. 40-49 (15.9%)
5. 50-59 (10.8%)
6. 60-69 (7.21%)
7. 70-79 (3.77%)
8. 80-89 (1.94%)
9. above 90 (1.21%)
Gender breakdown of Kota Marudu's electorate as of 2022
1. Male (50.7%)
2. Female (49.3%)

== History ==
=== Polling districts ===
According to the gazette issued on 21 November 2025, the Kota Marudu constituency has a total of 58 polling districts.

State constituency	Polling Districts	Code	Location
Matunggong（N05）	Sikuati	168/05/01	SK Sikuati
Matunggong（N05）	Dualog	168/05/02	SK Dualog
Matunggong（N05）	Pinawantai	168/05/03	SK Pinawantai Kudat
Matunggong（N05）	Tambuluran	168/05/04	Dewan Serba Guna Tambuluran
Matunggong（N05）	Indarason	168/05/05	SK Indarason Laut Kudat
Matunggong（N05）	Matunggong	168/05/06	SK Matunggong
Matunggong（N05）	Nangka	168/05/07	SK Lokoton
Matunggong（N05）	Tigaman	168/05/08	SK Tigaman
Matunggong（N05）	Rampai	168/05/09	SK Lok Yuk (M) Sikuati
Matunggong（N05）	Lodung	168/05/10	SK Lodung Kudat
Matunggong（N05）	Lokoton	168/05/11	SK Lokoton
Matunggong（N05）	Lajong	168/05/12	SK Lajong
Matunggong（N05）	Tinangol	168/05/13	SK Tinangol
Matunggong（N05）	Kandawayon	168/05/14	SK Parapat Darat
Matunggong（N05）	Muhang	168/05/15	SK Temuno Teringai Darat
Matunggong（N05）	Sebayan	168/05/16	SK Sebayan
Matunggong（N05）	Lotong	168/05/17	SK Lotong
Matunggong（N05）	Tagumamal Laut	168/05/18	SK Lampaki Kudat
Matunggong（N05）	Sampir	168/05/19	SK Sampir
Matunggong（N05）	Teringai Laut	168/05/20	SK Temuno Teringai Darat
Matunggong（N05）	Bingolon	168/05/21	SK Bingolon Kudat
Matunggong（N05）	Panudahan	168/05/22	SK Panudahan
Matunggong（N05）	Narandang	168/05/23	SK Garau Kudat
Matunggong（N05）	Terongkongan	168/05/24	SK Terongkongan
Matunggong（N05）	Pata	168/05/25	SK Pata
Bandau（N06）	Bintasan	168/06/01	SK Bengkongan
Bandau（N06）	Mangaris	168/06/02	SK Mangaris
Bandau（N06）	Tagaroh	168/06/03	SK Tagaroh
Bandau（N06）	Langkon	168/06/04	SK Langkon
Bandau（N06）	Panaitan	168/06/05	SK Panaitan
Bandau（N06）	Mangin	168/06/06	SK Mangin
Bandau（N06）	Ranau	168/06/07	SK Ranau
Bandau（N06）	Bongon	168/06/08	SJK (C) Khoi Ming
Bandau（N06）	Ongkilan	168/06/09	SK Ongkilan
Bandau（N06）	Taritipan	168/06/10	SK Taritipan
Bandau（N06）	Popok	168/06/11	SK Popok
Bandau（N06）	Tanjung Batu	168/06/12	SK Tanjung Batu
Bandau（N06）	Pangapuyan	168/06/13	SK Lampada
Tandek（N07）	Tingkalanon	168/07/01	SMK Tandek
Tandek（N07）	Talantang	168/07/02	SK Talantang
Tandek（N07）	Ulu Bengkoka	168/07/03	Tabika Kemas Kg Bombong 2
Tandek（N07）	Gana	168/07/04	Dewan Belia Gana
Tandek（N07）	Simpangan	168/07/05	SK Simpangan
Tandek（N07）	Malangkap	168/07/06	SK Melangkap
Tandek（N07）	Marak Parak	168/07/07	SK Marak-Parak
Tandek（N07）	Salimandut	168/07/08	SK Tumunda Salimandut
Tandek（N07）	Samparita	168/07/09	SK Samparita
Tandek（N07）	Lingkabungan	168/07/10	Balai Raya Lingkabungan II
Tandek（N07）	Sonsogon Magandai	168/07/11	SK Magandai
Tandek（N07）	Gouton	168/07/12	SK Gana
Tandek（N07）	Bombong I	168/07/13	Balai Raya Bombong I
Tandek（N07）	Damai	168/07/14	Dewan Belia Damai
Tandek（N07）	Tagibang	168/07/15	SK Tagibang
Tandek（N07）	Goshen	168/07/16	SMK Kota Marudu
Tandek（N07）	Timbang Batu	168/07/17	SK Timbang Batu
Tandek（N07）	Sunsui	168/07/18	SK Sunsui; Dewan Kampung Tangkol
Tandek（N07）	Masalog	168/07/19	SK Masalog

=== Representation history ===
Members of Parliament for Kota Marudu
Parliament	No	Years	Member	Party	Vote Share
Constituency created from Bandau and Marudu
11th	P168	2004-2008	Johnity @ Maximus Ongkili	BN (PBS)	10,457; 59.00%
12th	P168	2008-2013	Johnity @ Maximus Ongkili	BN (PBS)	12,028; 56.14%
13th	P168	2013-2018	Johnity @ Maximus Ongkili	BN (PBS)	15,168; 47.16%
14th	P168	2018	Johnity @ Maximus Ongkili	BN (PBS)	13,033; 38.44%
14th	P168	2018-2022	Johnity @ Maximus Ongkili	PBS	13,033; 38.44%
14th	P168	2022	Johnity @ Maximus Ongkili	GRS (PBS)	13,033; 38.44%
15th	P168	2022–present	Wetrom Bahanda (ويتروم باهندا)	KDM	24,318; 48.69%

=== State constituency ===
Parliamentary constituency	State constituency					
Parliamentary constituency	1967–1974	1974–1985	1985–1995	1995–2004	2004–2020	2020–present
Kota Marudu						Bandau
Kota Marudu					Matunggong	
Kota Marudu					Tandek	

=== Historical boundaries ===
State Constituency	Area	
State Constituency	2003	2019
Bandau		Bandau; Bintasan; Langkon; Kota Marudu; Pongoputan Baru
Matunggong	Bukah; Langkon; Sikuati; Taginambor; Teringai	Bukah; Matunggong; Sikuati; Teringai; Tinangol
Tandek	Kota Marudu; Salimandut; Talas; Tandek; Tinindukan	Salimandut; Talas; Tandek; Tinindukan; Sungai Rakit

=== Current state assembly members ===
No.	State Constituency	Member	Coalition (Party)
N05	Matunggong	Julita Mojungki	GRS (PBS)
N06	Bandau	Maijol Mahap	IND
N07	Tandek	Hendrus Anding	GRS (PBS)

=== Local governments & postcodes ===
No.	State Constituency	Local government	Postcode
N05	Matunggong	Kota Marudu District Council; Kudat Town Board (Sikuati and Indarason areas)	89050 Kudat; 89100 Kota Marudu
N06	Bandau	Kota Marudu District Council	89050 Kudat; 89100 Kota Marudu
N07	Tandek	Kota Marudu District Council	89050 Kudat; 89100 Kota Marudu

== Election results ==
Malaysian general election, 2022
Party	Candidate	Votes	%	∆%
KDM	Wetrom Bahanda	24,318	48.69	▲48.69
GRS	Johnity @ Maximus Ongkili	16,144	32.32	▲32.32
Heritage	Jilid Kuminding	5,320	10.65	▼10.33
MUDA	Shahrizal Denci	3,225	6.46	▲6.46
Independent	Norman Tulang	660	1.32	▲1.32
PEJUANG	Mohd Azmi Zulkiflee	279	0.56	▲0.56
Total valid votes		49,946	100.00	
Total rejected ballots		755		
Unreturned ballots		127		
Turnout		50,828	61.86	▼13.09
Registered electors		80,735		
Majority		8,174	16.37	▲11.14
KDM gain from BN		Swing		?
Source(s) https://lom.agc.gov.my/ilims/upload/portal/akta/outputp/1753262/PUB619_2022.pdf

Malaysian general election, 2018
Party	Candidate	Votes	%	∆%
BN	Johnity @ Maximus Ongkili	13,033	38.44	▼8.72
Sabah People's Hope Party	Maijol Mahap	11,259	33.21	▲33.21
Sabah Heritage Party	Barlus Mangabis	7,113	20.98	▲20.98
Love Sabah Party	Paul Porodong	2,501	7.37	▲7.37
Total valid votes		33,906	100.00	
Total rejected ballots		1,179		
Unreturned ballots		146		
Turnout		35,231	74.95	▼3.55
Registered electors		47,007		
Majority		1,774	5.23	▲2.60
BN hold		Swing		
Source(s) "His Majesty's Government Gazette - Notice of Contested Election, Parliament for the State of Sabah [P.U. (B) 246/2018]" (PDF). Attorney General's Chambers of Malaysia. 3 May 2018. "Federal Government Gazette - Results of Contested Election and Statements of the Poll after the Official Addition of Votes, Parliamentary Constituencies for the State of Sabah [P.U. (B) 320/2018]" (PDF). Attorney General's Chambers of Malaysia. 28 May 2018. Archived from the original (PDF) on 2019-12-29.

Malaysian general election, 2013
Party	Candidate	Votes	%	∆%
BN	Johnity @ Maximus Ongkili	15,168	47.16	▼8.98
PKR	Maijol Mahap	14,326	44.53	▲7.98
STAR	Majamis Timbong	2,228	6.93	▲6.93
SAPP	Yuntau K. Kolod	444	1.38	▲1.38
Total valid votes		32,166	100.00	
Total rejected ballots		911		
Unreturned ballots		48		
Turnout		33,125	78.50	▲8.99
Registered electors		42,197		
Majority		842	2.63	▼16.96
BN hold		Swing		
Source(s) "Federal Government Gazette - Notice of Contested Election, Parliament for the State of Sabah [P.U. (B) 183/2013]" (PDF). Attorney General's Chambers of Malaysia. 26 April 2013. Archived from the original (PDF) on 2018-09-30. "Federal Government Gazette - Results of Contested Election and Statements of the Poll after the Official Addition of Votes, Parliamentary Constituencies for the State of Sabah [P.U. (B) 224/2013]" (PDF). Attorney General's Chambers of Malaysia. 22 May 2013. Archived from the original (PDF) on 2018-09-30.

Malaysian general election, 2008
Party	Candidate	Votes	%	∆%
BN	Johnity @ Maximus Ongkili	12,028	56.14	▼2.86
PKR	Andonny Pilit @ Anthony Biri Mandiau	7,830	36.55	▲36.55
Independent	Roslan Mohd Zain	1,109	5.18	▲5.18
BERSEKUTU	Berman Angkap	457	2.13	▲2.13
Total valid votes		21,424	100.00	
Total rejected ballots		748		
Unreturned ballots		27		
Turnout		22,199	69.51	▲3.25
Registered electors		31,938		
Majority		4,198	19.59	▲1.59
BN hold		Swing		

Malaysian general election, 2004
Party	Candidate	Votes	%
BN	Johnity @ Maximus Ongkili	10,457	59.00
Independent	Andonny Pilit @ Anthony Biri Mandiau	7,268	41.00
Total valid votes		17,725	100.00
Total rejected ballots		901	
Unreturned ballots			
Turnout		18,626	66.26
Registered electors		28,110	
Majority		3,189	18.00
This was a new constituency created.
