= Wetrom Bahanda =

Malaysian politician (born 1970)

Yang Berhormat Datuk Wetrom Bahanda PGDK BSK MP
- ويتروم باهندا

State Assistant Minister to the Chief Minister of Sabah
- In office 8 October 2020 – 21 October 2022 Serving with Abidin Madingkir
- Governor: Juhar Mahiruddin
- Chief Minister: Hajiji Noor
- Preceded by: Arifin Asgali
- Succeeded by: Nizam Abu Bakar Titingan
- Constituency: Bandau

Member of the Malaysian Parliament for Kota Marudu
- Incumbent
- Assumed office 19 November 2022
- Preceded by: Maximus Ongkili (BN–PBS)
- Majority: 8,174 (2022)

Member of the Sabah State Legislative Assembly for Bandau
- In office 26 September 2020 – 29 November 2025
- Preceded by: Position established
- Succeeded by: Maijol Mahap
- Majority: 3,363 (2020)

1st Deputy President of the Social Democratic Harmony Party (Muslim Bumiputera)
- Incumbent
- Assumed office 21 October 2022 Serving with Juil Nuatim (Non-Muslim Bumiputera, 2022–2023) & Priscella Peter (Non-Muslim Bumiputera, 2023–2025)
- President: Peter Anthony (2022–2025); Priscella Peter (since 2025)
- Preceded by: Position established

Faction represented in Dewan Rakyat
- 2022–: Social Democratic Harmony Party

Faction represented in the Sabah State Legislative Assembly
- 2020–2022: Perikatan Nasional
- 2022–2025: Social Democratic Harmony Party

Personal details
- Born: Wetrom bin Bahanda; 25 May 1970 (age 56) Kota Marudu, Sabah, Malaysia
- Citizenship: Malaysia
- Party: United Malays National Organisation of Sabah (Sabah UMNO) (until 2018); Malaysian United Indigenous Party of Sabah (Sabah BERSATU) (2019–2022); Social Democratic Harmony Party (KDM) (since 2022)
- Other political affiliations: Barisan Nasional (BN) (until 2018); Pakatan Harapan (PH) (2019–2020); Perikatan Nasional (PN) (2020–2022); Gabungan Rakyat Sabah (GRS) (2020–2022)
- Spouse: Doreen Yubing
- Relations: Verdon Bahanda (younger brother); Redonah Bahanda (younger sister)
- Occupation: Politician

Wetrom bin Bahanda (born 25 May 1970) is a Malaysian politician who has served as the Member of Parliament (MP) for Kota Marudu since November 2022 and Member of the Sabah State Legislative Assembly (MLA) for Bandau since September 2020. He served as the State Assistant Minister to the Chief Minister of Sabah in the Gabungan Rakyat Sabah (GRS) state administration under Chief Minister Hajiji Noor from October 2020 to his resignation in October 2022. He is a member of the Social Democratic Harmony Party (KDM) and formerly a member of the Malaysian United Indigenous Party (BERSATU), a component party of the ruling Perikatan Nasional (PN) and GRS as well as formerly the Pakatan Harapan (PH) coalitions and was a member of the United Malays National Organisation of Sabah (Sabah UMNO), a branch of a component party of the Barisan Nasional (BN) coalition. He has also served as the 1st Deputy President of KDM for the Muslim Bumiputera quota since October 2022. He is also the elder brother of Verdon Bahanda, the Kudat MP.

== Election results ==
Sabah State Legislative Assembly
Year	Constituency	Candidate	Votes	Pct	Opponent(s)	Votes	Pct	Ballots cast	Majority	Turnout
2020	N06 Bandau	Wetrom Bahanda (Sabah BERSATU)	5,863	60.41%	Majamis Timbong (WARISAN)	2,500	25.76%	9,706	3,363	66.41%
2020	N06 Bandau	Wetrom Bahanda (Sabah BERSATU)	5,863	60.41%	Azahari Amit (USNO Baru)	477	4.91%	9,706	3,363	66.41%
2020	N06 Bandau	Wetrom Bahanda (Sabah BERSATU)	5,863	60.41%	Webley Disim (PCS)	477	4.91%	9,706	3,363	66.41%
2020	N06 Bandau	Wetrom Bahanda (Sabah BERSATU)	5,863	60.41%	Raphael Biun (LDP)	331	3.41%	9,706	3,363	66.41%
2020	N06 Bandau	Wetrom Bahanda (Sabah BERSATU)	5,863	60.41%	Tolok Delly Surag (IND)	58	0.60%	9,706	3,363	66.41%
2025	N05 Matunggong	Wetrom Bahanda (KDM)	8,762	45.52%	Julita Mojungki (PBS)	9,096	47.25%	19,249	334	66.80%
2025	N05 Matunggong	Wetrom Bahanda (KDM)	8,762	45.52%	Jornah Mozihim (WARISAN)	1,138	5.91%	19,249	334	66.80%
2025	N05 Matunggong	Wetrom Bahanda (KDM)	8,762	45.52%	J Ojilim Asam (IMPIAN)	133	0.69%	19,249	334	66.80%
2025	N05 Matunggong	Wetrom Bahanda (KDM)	8,762	45.52%	Ainin Ekon (IND)	75	0.39%	19,249	334	66.80%
2025	N05 Matunggong	Wetrom Bahanda (KDM)	8,762	45.52%	Freddy Chong Yee Vui (PKS)	45	0.23%	19,249	334	66.80%

Parliament of Malaysia
Year	Constituency	Candidate	Votes	Pct	Opponent(s)	Votes	Pct	Ballots cast	Majority	Turnout
2022	P168 Kota Marudu	Wetrom Bahanda (KDM)	24,318	48.69%	Maximus Ongkili (PBS)	16,144	32.32%	49,946	8,174	61.86%
2022	P168 Kota Marudu	Wetrom Bahanda (KDM)	24,318	48.69%	Jilid Kuminding (WARISAN)	5,320	10.65%	49,946	8,174	61.86%
2022	P168 Kota Marudu	Wetrom Bahanda (KDM)	24,318	48.69%	Shahrizal Denci (MUDA)	3,225	6.46%	49,946	8,174	61.86%
2022	P168 Kota Marudu	Wetrom Bahanda (KDM)	24,318	48.69%	Norman Tulang (IND)	660	1.32%	49,946	8,174	61.86%
2022	P168 Kota Marudu	Wetrom Bahanda (KDM)	24,318	48.69%	Mohd Azmi Zulkiflee (PEJUANG)	279	0.56%	49,946	8,174	61.86%

== Honours ==
=== Honours of Malaysia ===
- Malaysia
  - Recipient of the 17th Yang di-Pertuan Agong Installation Medal (2025)
- Sabah
  - Commander of the Order of Kinabalu (PGDK) – Datuk (2011)
  - Grand Star of the Order of Kinabalu (BSK) (2004)
