= Bandau (state constituency) =

State constituency in Sabah, Malaysia

Bandau (N06)
Sabah constituency

State constituency
- Legislature: Sabah State Legislative Assembly
MLA
Maijol Mahap
Independent
- Constituency created: 2019
- First contested: 2020
- Last contested: 2025

Demographics
- Electors (2025): 27,390

Bandau is a state constituency in Sabah, Malaysia, that is represented in the Sabah State Legislative Assembly. This is one of the thirteen new state constituencies as result of approval from state legislative and Dewan Rakyat on 17 July 2019 and presenting for the first time for snap election

== Demographics ==
As of 2020, Bandau has a population of 35,063 people.

Ethnic breakdown of Bandau's electorate as of 2025
1. Non-Muslim Bumiputera (52.0%)
2. Muslim Bumiputera (43.0%)
3. Chinese (3.80%)
4. Other ethnicities (1.20%)

== History ==
=== Polling districts ===
According to the gazette issued on 31 October 2022, the Bandau constituency has a total of 13 polling districts.

State constituency	Polling Districts	Code	Location
Bandau（N06）	Bintasan	168/06/01	SK Bengkongan
Bandau（N06）	Mangaris	168/06/02	SK Mangaris
Bandau（N06）	Tagaroh	168/06/03	SK Tagaroh
Bandau（N06）	Langkon	168/06/04	SK Langkon
Bandau（N06）	Panaitan	168/06/05	SK Panaitan
Bandau（N06）	Mangin	168/06/06	SK Mangin
Bandau（N06）	Ranau	168/06/07	SK Ranau
Bandau（N06）	Bongon	168/06/08	SJK (C) Khoi Ming
Bandau（N06）	Ongkilan	168/06/09	SK Ongkilan
Bandau（N06）	Taritipan	168/06/10	SK Taritipan
Bandau（N06）	Popok	168/06/11	SK Popok
Bandau（N06）	Tanjung Batu	168/06/12	SK Tanjung Batu
Bandau（N06）	Pangapuyan	168/06/13	SK Lampada

=== Representation history ===
Members of the Legislative Assembly for Bandau
Assembly	No	Years	Member	Party
Constituency created from Matunggong and Tandek
16th	N06	2020–2022	Wetrom Bahanda	GRS (BERSATU)
16th	N06	2022–2025	Wetrom Bahanda	KDM
17th	N06	2025–present	Maijol Mahap	Independent

== Election results ==
Sabah state election, 2025
Party	Candidate	Votes	%	∆%
Independent	Maijol Mahap	3,996	22.78	▲22.78
GRS	Redonah Bahanda	3,752	21.39	▲21.39
PH	Zaidi Jatil	2,631	15.00	▲15.00
KDM	Jaiping Minsu	2,471	14.09	▲14.09
Heritage	Rizam Abd Rahman	1,613	9.20	▼15.88
Homeland Solidarity Party	Shirewin D Patrick	1,189	6.78	▲6.78
UPKO	Suzie Salapan	859	4.90	▲4.90
Independent	Jolius Majawai	472	2.69	▲2.69
BN	Willey Lampaki	380	2.17	▲2.17
Sabah Dream Party	Sauting Rabuyot	97	0.55	▲0.55
ASPIRASI	Norman Tulang	30	0.17	▲0.17
PBK	Robbin Banati	28	0.16	▲0.16
Sabah Nationality Party	Sitti Haima Jailani	24	0.14	▲0.14
Total valid votes		17,542	100.00	
Total rejected ballots		380		
Unreturned ballots		44		
Turnout		17,966	65.59	▼2.61
Registered electors		27,390		
Majority		244	1.39	▼32.35
Independent gain from PN		Swing		?
Source(s) "RESULTS OF CONTESTED ELECTION AND STATEMENTS OF THE POLL AFTER THE OFFICIAL ADDITION OF VOTES" (PDF).

Sabah state election, 2020
Party	Candidate	Votes	%
PN	Wetrom Bahanda	5,863	58.82
Sabah Heritage Party	Majamis Timbong	2,500	25.08
USNO (Baru)	Azahari Amit	477	4.79
Love Sabah Party	Webley Disim	477	4.79
LDP	Raphael Biun	331	3.32
Independent	Delly Surag @ Tolok	58	0.58
Total valid votes		9,706	97.37
Total rejected ballots		225	2.26
Unreturned ballots		37	0.37
Turnout		9,968	68.20
Registered electors		14,615	
Majority		3,363	33.74
This was a new constituency created.
