= Melalap (state constituency) =

State constituency of Sabah, Malaysia

Melalap (N42)
Sabah constituency

State constituency
- Legislature: Sabah State Legislative Assembly
MLA
Jamawi Ja'afar
PH
- Constituency created: 1994
- First contested: 1999
- Last contested: 2025

Demographics
- Electors (2025): 21,320

Melalap is a state constituency in Sabah, Malaysia, that is represented in the Sabah State Legislative Assembly.

== Demographics ==
As of 2020, Melalap has a population of 25,084 people.

Ethnic breakdown of Melalap's electorate as of 2025
1. Non-Muslim Bumiputera (61.0%)
2. Muslim Bumiputera (27.0%)
3. Chinese (12.0%)
4. Other ethnicities (0.00%)

== History ==
=== Polling districts ===
According to the gazette issued on 31 October 2022, the Melalap constituency has a total of 10 polling districts.

State constituency	Polling District	Code	Location
Melalap (N42)	Pamilaan	181/42/01	SK St Pius Pamilaan
Melalap (N42)	Melalap	181/42/02	SK Melalap
Melalap (N42)	Lagud	181/42/03	SK Lagud
Melalap (N42)	Kalang	181/42/04	SM Tshung Tsin Tenom
Melalap (N42)	Tenom Utara	181/42/05	SJK (C) Chung Hwa
Melalap (N42)	Tenom Selatan	181/42/06	SK Pekan Tenom
Melalap (N42)	Saga	181/42/07	SK Saga
Melalap (N42)	Mandalom	181/42/08	SK Mandalom Lama; SMK Entabuan
Melalap (N42)	Pangi	181/42/09	SK Pangi
Melalap (N42)	Pagukon	181/42/10	SK Pagukon

=== Representation history ===
Member of Sabah State Legislative Assembly for Melalap
Assembly	No	Years	Member	Party
Constituency created from Tenom, Bingkor and Sook
11th	N30	1999 – 2002	Radin Malleh	PBS
11th	N30	2002 – 2004	Radin Malleh	BN (PBS)
12th	N35	2004 – 2008	Radin Malleh	BN (PBS)
13th	N35	2008 – 2013	Radin Malleh	BN (PBS)
14th	N35	2013 – 2018	Radin Malleh	BN (PBS)
15th	N35	2018 – 2020	Peter Anthony	WARISAN
16th	N42	2020 – 2021	Peter Anthony	WARISAN
16th	N42	2021 – 2022	Peter Anthony	Independent
16th	N42	2022 – 2025	Peter Anthony	KDM
16th	N42	2025	Vacant	
17th	N42	2025–present	Jamawi Ja'afar	PH (PKR)

== Election results ==
Sabah state election, 2025
Party	Candidate	Votes	%	∆%
PH	Jamawi Ja’afar	5,064	33.80	▲33.80
KDM	Priscella Peter	4,539	30.29	▲30.29
Independent	Gabriel George Tulas	2,879	19.22	▲19.22
UPKO	Junik Bajit	1,702	11.36	▲11.36
Heritage	Cheld Bryend Lind	448	2.99	▼46.47
Homeland Solidarity Party	Alviana Linus	271	1.81	▲1.81
Independent	Fatimah Ibrahim	59	0.39	▲0.39
Sabah Dream Party	Kelvin Chong	21	0.14	▲0.14
Total valid votes		14,983		
Total rejected ballots		135		
Unreturned ballots		36		
Turnout		15,154	71.08	▼4.71
Registered electors		21,320		
Majority		525	3.51	▼12.7
PH gain from Heritage		Swing		?
Source(s) "RESULTS OF CONTESTED ELECTION AND STATEMENTS OF THE POLL AFTER THE OFFICIAL ADDITION OF VOTES" (PDF).

Sabah state election, 2020
Party	Candidate	Votes	%	∆%
Sabah Heritage Party	Peter Anthony	5,245	49.46	▲3.86
BN	Jamawi Ja’afar	3,526	33.25	▼9.69
PBS	Radin Malleh	1,359	12.81	▲12.81
Love Sabah Party	Apiang Sausun	268	2.53	▼1.90
USNO (Baru)	Sazali Justi	32	0.30	▲0.30
LDP	Masdin Tumas	23	0.22	▲0.22
Total valid votes		10,453	98.57	
Total rejected ballots		130	1.23	
Unreturned ballots		22	0.21	
Turnout		10,605	75.79	▼2.70
Registered electors		13,993		
Majority		1,719	16.21	▲13.55
Sabah Heritage Party hold		Swing		
Source(s) "RESULTS OF CONTESTED ELECTION AND STATEMENTS OF THE POLL AFTER THE OFFICIAL ADDITION OF VOTES".

Sabah state election, 2018
Party	Candidate	Votes	%	∆%
Sabah Heritage Party	Peter Anthony	5,010	45.60	▲45.60
BN	Radin Malleh	4,717	42.94	▼4.28
STAR	Jimmy Jawatah	861	7.84	▼1.56
Love Sabah Party	Chinly Moniu @ Mah Tsen Li	69	0.63	▲0.63
Sabah Nationality Party	George Rejos	45	0.41	▲0.41
Total valid votes		10,702	97.41	
Total rejected ballots		222	2.02	
Unreturned ballots		62	0.56	
Turnout		10,986	78.49	▼2.94
Registered electors		13,996		
Majority		293	2.66	▼23.77
Sabah Heritage Party gain from BN		Swing		?
Source(s) "RESULTS OF CONTESTED ELECTION AND STATEMENTS OF THE POLL AFTER THE OFFICIAL ADDITION OF VOTES".

Sabah state election, 2013
Party	Candidate	Votes	%	∆%
BN	Radin Malleh	4,643	47.22	▼15.19
SAPP	Roger Stimin	2,044	20.79	▲20.79
DAP	Noorita Sual	1,992	20.26	▲20.26
STAR	Kong Fui Seng	924	9.40	▲9.40
Total valid votes		9,603	97.67	
Total rejected ballots		222	2.26	
Unreturned ballots		7	0.07	
Turnout		9,832	81.43	▲10.79
Registered electors		12,074		
Majority		2,599	26.43	▼2.49
BN hold		Swing		
Source(s) "KEPUTUSAN PILIHAN RAYA UMUM DEWAN UNDANGAN NEGERI".

Sabah state election, 2008
Party	Candidate	Votes	%	∆%
BN	Radin Malleh	4,530	62.41	
PKR	Jaineh Juata @ Jimmy Jawatah	2,431	33.49	
BERSEKUTU	Belud @ Jeffery Kumbang	122	1.68	
Total valid votes		7,083	97.58	
Total rejected ballots		176	2.42	
Unreturned ballots		0	0.00	
Turnout		7,259	70.64	
Registered electors		10,276		
Majority		2,099	28.92	
BN hold		Swing		
Source(s) "KEPUTUSAN PILIHAN RAYA UMUM DEWAN UNDANGAN NEGERI SABAH BAGI TAHUN 2008".

Sabah state election, 2004
Party	Candidate	Votes	%	∆%
On the nomination day, Radin Malleh won uncontested.
BN	Radin Malleh			
Total valid votes				
Total rejected ballots				
Unreturned ballots				
Turnout				
Registered electors		10,018		
Majority				
BN gain from PBS		Swing		?
Source(s) "KEPUTUSAN PILIHAN RAYA UMUM DEWAN UNDANGAN NEGERI SABAH BAGI TAHUN 2004".

Sabah state election, 1999
Party	Candidate	Votes	%
PBS	Radin Malleh	6,886	56.98
BN	Kadoh Agundong	4,626	38.28
BERSEKUTU	Edward Sibin	337	2.79
Independent	Jait Mahat	73	0.60
Independent	George Rejos	58	0.48
Total valid votes		11,980	99.13
Total rejected ballots		105	0.87
Unreturned ballots		0	0.00
Turnout		12,085	72.77
Registered electors		16,607	
Majority		2,260	18.70
This was a new constituency created.
Source(s) "KEPUTUSAN PILIHAN RAYA UMUM DEWAN UNDANGAN NEGERI SABAH BAGI TAHUN 1999".
