= Matunggong =

State constituency in Sabah, Malaysia

Matunggong (N05)
Sabah constituency

State constituency
- Legislature: Sabah State Legislative Assembly
MLA
Julita Majungki
GRS
- Constituency created: 1976
- First contested: 1976
- Last contested: 2025

Demographics
- Electors (2025): 29,176

Matunggong is a state constituency in Sabah, Malaysia, that is represented in the Sabah State Legislative Assembly.

== Demographics ==
As of 2020, Matunggong has a population of 34,457 people.

Ethnic breakdown of Matunggong's electorate as of 2025
1. Non-Muslim Bumiputera (76.0%)
2. Muslim Bumiputera (23.0%)
3. Chinese (0.80%)
4. Other ethnicities (0.20%)

== History ==
=== Polling districts ===
According to the gazette issued on 31 October 2022, the Matunggong constituency has a total of 25 polling districts.

State constituency	Polling Districts	Code	Location
Matunggong（N05）	Sikuati	168/05/01	SK Sikuati
Matunggong（N05）	Dualog	168/05/02	SK Dualog
Matunggong（N05）	Pinawantai	168/05/03	SK Pinawantai Kudat
Matunggong（N05）	Tambuluran	168/05/04	Dewan Serba Guna Tambuluran
Matunggong（N05）	Indarason	168/05/05	SK Indarason Laut Kudat
Matunggong（N05）	Matunggong	168/05/06	SK Matunggong
Matunggong（N05）	Nangka	168/05/07	Pra Sekolah SK Lokoton
Matunggong（N05）	Tigaman	168/05/08	SK Tigaman
Matunggong（N05）	Rampai	168/05/09	SK Lok Yuk (M) Sikuati
Matunggong（N05）	Lodung	168/05/10	SK Lodung Kudat
Matunggong（N05）	Lokoton	168/05/11	SK Lokoton
Matunggong（N05）	Lajong	168/05/12	SK Lajong
Matunggong（N05）	Tinangol	168/05/13	SK Tinangol
Matunggong（N05）	Kandawayon	168/05/14	SK Parapat Darat
Matunggong（N05）	Muhang	168/05/15	SK Temuno Teringai Darat
Matunggong（N05）	Sebayan	168/05/16	SK Sebayan
Matunggong（N05）	Lotong	168/05/17	SK Lotong
Matunggong（N05）	Tagumamal Laut	168/05/18	SK Lamlaki Kudat
Matunggong（N05）	Sampir	168/05/19	SK Sampir
Matunggong（N05）	Teringai Laut	168/05/20	SK Temuno Teringai Darat
Matunggong（N05）	Bingolon	168/05/21	SK Bingolon Kudat
Matunggong（N05）	Panudahan	168/05/22	SK Panudahan
Matunggong（N05）	Narandang	168/05/23	SK Garau Kudat
Matunggong（N05）	Terongkongan	168/05/24	SK Terongkongan
Matunggong（N05）	Pata	168/05/25	SK Pata

=== Representation history ===
Members of the Legislative Assembly for Matunggong
Assembly	No	Years	Member	Party
Constituency created from Langkon
5th	N04	1976–1977	Michael Francis Wong	BERJAYA
5th	N04	1977-1978	Amil Matiggi	BERJAYA
5th	N04	1978-1981	George Mojuntin	BERJAYA
6th	N04	1981–1985	Michael Francis Wong @ Mohamad Faizal	BN (BERJAYA)
7th	N04	1985–1986	Mathius Majihi	PBS
8th	N04	1986–1990	Mathius Majihi	PBS
9th	N04	1990-1994	Mathius Majihi	GR (PBS)
10th	N04	1994	Markus Majihi	GR (PBS)
10th	N04	1994-1999	Markus Majihi	BN (PDS)
11th	N04	1999-2002	Atong Mangabis	PBS
11th	N04	2002–2004	Atong Mangabis	BN (PBS)
12th	N04	2004–2008	Jornah Mozihim	BN (PBS)
13th	N04	2008–2013	Sarapin Magana	BN (PBS)
14th	N04	2013–2015	Jelani Dasanap	PKR
14th	N04	2015-2018	Jelani Dasanap	Independent
15th	N04	2018	Julita Mojungki	BN (PBS)
15th	N04	2018–2020	Julita Mojungki	PBS
16th	N05	2020–2025	Julita Mojungki	GRS (PBS)
17th	N05	2025–present	Julita Mojungki	GRS (PBS)

== Election results ==
Pre 1990 elections, unreturned vote data is not found

Sabah state election, 2025: Matunggong
Party	Candidate	Votes	%	∆%
GRS	Julita Mojungki	9,096	47.25	▲47.25
KDM	Wetrom Bahanda	8,762	45.52	▲45.52
Heritage	Jornah Mozihim	1,138	5.91	▲5.91
Sabah Dream Party	Jimmy Ojilim Asam	133	0.69	▲0.69
Independent	Ainin Ekon	75	0.39	▲0.39
Sabah Nationality Party	Freddy Chong Yee Vui	45	0.23	▲0.23
Total valid votes		19,249		
Total rejected ballots		220		
Unreturned ballots		20		
Turnout		19,489	66.80	▲0.02
Registered electors		29,176		
Majority		334	1.73	▼11.48
GRS gain from PBS		Swing		?
Source(s) "RESULTS OF CONTESTED ELECTION AND STATEMENTS OF THE POLL AFTER THE OFFICIAL ADDITION OF VOTES" (PDF).

Sabah state election, 2020: Matunggong
Party	Candidate	Votes	%	∆%
PBS	Julita Mojungki	4,369	38.23	▲38.23
BN	Richard Kastum	2,859	25.02	▼15.25
PKR	Sazalye Donol Abdullah	1,680	14.70	▼15.79
Independent	Paul Porodong	1,069	9.36	▲9.36
Love Sabah Party	Sarapin Magana	843	7.38	▼0.44
GAGASAN	Hibin Masalin	223	1.95	▲1.95
Independent	Ronald Tampasok	82	0.72	▲0.72
Independent	Joseff Emmanuel	51	0.45	▲0.45
Total valid votes		11,176	97.80	
Total rejected ballots		238	2.08	
Unreturned ballots		13	0.11	
Turnout		11,427	66.78	▼8.52
Registered electors		17,111		
Majority		1,510	13.21	▲3.43
PBS gain from BN		Swing		?
Source(s) "RESULTS OF CONTESTED ELECTION AND STATEMENTS OF THE POLL AFTER THE OFFICIAL ADDITION OF VOTES".

Sabah state election, 2018: Matunggong
Party	Candidate	Votes	%	∆%
BN	Julita Mojungki	6,946	40.27	▼1.39
PKR	Sazalye Donol Abdullah	5,259	30.49	▼13.18
STAR	Marunsai Dawai	2,968	17.21	▲7.55
Love Sabah Party	Jornah Mozihim	1,348	7.82	▲7.82
Sabah Nationality Party	Rahim Madhakong	98	0.57	▲0.57
Total valid votes		16,619	96.35	
Total rejected ballots		577	3.35	
Unreturned ballots		72	0.42	
Turnout		17,248	75.30	▼4.30
Registered electors		22,906		
Majority		1,687	9.78	▲7.77
BN gain from PKR		Swing		?
Source(s) "RESULTS OF CONTESTED ELECTION AND STATEMENTS OF THE POLL AFTER THE OFFICIAL ADDITION OF VOTES".

Sabah state election, 2013: Matunggong
Party	Candidate	Votes	%	∆%
PKR	Jelin Dasanap	6,947	43.67	▲9.48
BN	Sarapin Magana	6,627	41.66	▼19.94
STAR	Marunsai Dawai	1,536	9.66	▲9.66
SAPP	Richard Jiun	367	2.31	▲2.31
Independent	Jolius Majawai	54	0.34	▲0.34
Total valid votes		15,531	97.63	
Total rejected ballots		370	2.33	
Unreturned ballots		7	0.04	
Turnout		15,908	79.60	▲8.96
Registered electors		19,977		
Majority		320	2.01	▼25.40
PKR gain from BN		Swing		?
Source(s) "KEPUTUSAN PILIHAN RAYA UMUM DEWAN UNDANGAN NEGERI"."Tindak Malaysia GitHub".

Sabah state election, 2008: Matunggong
Party	Candidate	Votes	%	∆%
BN	Sarapin Magana	6,701	61.60	▲8.47
PKR	Muada Ojihi	3,719	34.19	▲34.19
BERSEKUTU	Santain Manurun	191	1.76	▼1.19
Total valid votes		10,611	97.54	
Total rejected ballots		254	2.33	
Unreturned ballots		14	0.13	
Turnout		10,879	70.64	▲5.91
Registered electors		15,400		
Majority		2,982	27.41	▲12.93
BN hold		Swing		
Source(s) "KEPUTUSAN PILIHAN RAYA UMUM DEWAN UNDANGAN NEGERI PERAK BAGI TAHUN 2008"."Tindak Malaysia GitHub".

Sabah state election, 2004: Matunggong
Party	Candidate	Votes	%	∆%
BN	Jornah Mozihim	4,675	53.13	▲15.19
Independent	James Rubinsin Kotulai	3,401	38.65	▲38.65
BERSEKUTU	Berman Angkap	260	2.95	▼0.19
PASOK	Jauning @ Tommy Malukis	217	2.47	▲2.47
Total valid votes		8,553	97.19	
Total rejected ballots		247	2.81	
Unreturned ballots		0	0.00	
Turnout		8,800	64.73	▼12.5
Registered electors		13,594		
Majority		1,274	14.48	▼4.72
BN gain from PBS		Swing		?
Source(s) "KEPUTUSAN PILIHAN RAYA UMUM DEWAN UNDANGAN NEGERI PERAK BAGI TAHUN 2004"."Tindak Malaysia GitHub".

Sabah state election, 1999: Matunggong
Party	Candidate	Votes	%	∆%
PBS	Atong Mangabis	5,131	57.14	▼3.81
BN	Markus Majihi	3,407	37.94	▲6.35
BERSEKUTU	Berman Angkap	282	3.14	▲3.14
SETIA	Junan Olok	59	0.66	▲0.66
Total valid votes		8,879	98.88	
Total rejected ballots		95	1.06	
Unreturned ballots		5	0.05	
Turnout		8,979	77.23	▲10.1
Registered electors		11,627		
Majority		1,724	19.20	▼10.16
PBS hold		Swing		
Source(s) "KEPUTUSAN PILIHAN RAYA UMUM DEWAN UNDANGAN NEGERI PERAK BAGI TAHUN 1999"."Tindak Malaysia GitHub".

Sabah state election, 1994: Matunggong
Party	Candidate	Votes	%	∆%
PBS	Markus Majihi	3,826	60.95	▲0.43
BN	Jelin Dasanap	1,983	31.59	▲31.59
Independent	Henry Madatang	344	5.48	▲5.48
Independent	Apin Santi	37	0.59	▲0.59
Total valid votes		6,190	98.61	
Total rejected ballots		87	1.39	
Unreturned ballots		0	0.00	
Turnout		6,277	67.13	▼8.82
Registered electors		9,350		
Majority		1,843	29.36	▼13.15
PBS hold		Swing		
Source(s) "KEPUTUSAN PILIHAN RAYA UMUM DEWAN UNDANGAN NEGERI PERAK BAGI TAHUN 1994"."Tindak Malaysia GitHub".

Sabah state election, 1990: Matunggong
Party	Candidate	Votes	%	∆%
PBS	Mathius Majihi	3,411	60.52	▼3.22
AKAR	Rosley Asantie	1,015	18.01	▲18.01
PRS	Johnny Kololong Sokuroh	753	13.36	▲13.36
BERJAYA	Abah Mengimpal @ George Abah	325	5.77	▼1.94
Total valid votes		5,504	97.66	
Total rejected ballots		132	2.34	
Unreturned ballots		1	0.00	
Turnout		5,637	75.96	▼2.70
Registered electors		7,421		
Majority		2,396	42.51	▼1.20
PBS hold		Swing		
Source(s) "KEPUTUSAN PILIHAN RAYA UMUM DEWAN UNDANGAN NEGERI PERAK BAGI TAHUN 1990". "Tindak Malaysia GitHub".

Sabah state election, 1986: Matunggong
Party	Candidate	Votes	%	∆%
PBS	Mathius Majihi	3,644	64.82	▲64.82
USNO	Sagid Mongulintad	1,145	20.37	▲20.37
BERJAYA	Johnny Kololong Sokuroh	441	7.84	▼52.40
Independent	Abah Mengimpal @ George Abah	392	6.97	▲5.91
Total valid votes		5,622	100.00	
Total rejected ballots		95		
Unreturned ballots				
Turnout		5,717	78.65	▼2.54
Registered electors		7,269		
Majority		2,499	44.45	▲22.92
PBS gain from BERJAYA		Swing		?
Source(s) "KEPUTUSAN PILIHAN RAYA UMUM DEWAN UNDANGAN NEGERI PERAK BAGI TAHUN 1986". "Tindak Malaysia GitHub".

Sabah state election, 1981: Matunggong
Party	Candidate	Votes	%	∆%
BERJAYA	Michael Francis Wong	2,336	60.24	▼1.39
PASOK	Mathius Majihi	1,501	38.71	▲38.71
Independent	Jamud Seboy	41	1.06	▼3.41
Total valid votes		3,878	100.00	
Total rejected ballots		66		
Unreturned ballots				
Turnout		3,944	81.19	▼6.16
Registered electors		4,858		
Majority		835	21.53	▼6.20
BERJAYA hold		Swing		
Source(s) "Tindak Malaysia GitHub".

Sabah state election, 1976: Matunggong
Party	Candidate	Votes	%
BERJAYA	Michael Francis Wong	2,207	61.63
USNO	Peter Haji Samsuddin	1,214	33.90
Independent	Tam Ah Ken	160	4.47
Total valid votes		3,581	100.00
Total rejected ballots		92	
Unreturned ballots		0	
Turnout		3,673	87.35
Registered electors		4,205	
Majority		993	27.73
This was a new constituency created
Source(s) "Tindak Malaysia GitHub".
