= Priscella Peter =

Malaysian politician (born 1998)

2nd President of the Social Democratic Harmony Party
- Incumbent
- Assumed office 27 March 2025
- Preceded by: Peter Anthony

Personal details
- Born: Priscella Peter; 1998 (age 27–28) Tenom, Sabah, Malaysia
- Party: Social Democratic Harmony Party (KDM)
- Parent: Peter Anthony (father)
- Education: Curtin University (MAcc)
- Occupation: Politician; Accountant

Priscella Peter (born 1998) is a Malaysian politician who is the 2nd President of the Social Democratic Harmony Party (KDM). She is the daughter of the founder and 1st President of KDM, Peter Anthony. She is the first woman to lead a local political party in Sabah.

== Personal life and education ==
Priscella Peter is the daughter of Datuk Peter Anthony, a veteran Sabahan politician and the founder of KDM. She is a graduate of Curtin University, Australia, where she obtained a master's degree in accounting.

== Political career ==
=== Appointment as KDM President ===
Priscella was appointed as the acting president of KDM on March 7, 2025, by the party's supreme council in a unanimous decision. She took over the party leadership from her father, Peter Anthony, who was disqualified from his post after the Court of Appeal upheld his conviction and sentence.

Her father was sentenced to three years in prison and a RM50,000 fine for falsifying a letter related to a Universiti Malaysia Sabah (UMS) maintenance contract in 2014. The conviction resulted in his automatic disqualification as the assemblyman for Melalap, paving the way for his daughter's entry into the party's top leadership.

Upon her appointment, Priscella stated her commitment to strengthening the party in collaboration with other leaders, including Deputy President Datuk Wetrom Bahanda, and expressed confidence that KDM would be part of the new state government after the election.

At 27 years old, her appointment was historic, making her the first woman to be president of a local Sabahan political party.

== 2025 Sabah state election ==
As the leader of KDM, Priscella is leading her party into the 2025 Sabah state election, scheduled for November 29, 2025, where KDM has announced it will contest at least 38 state seats. Priscella is making her electoral debut as the KDM candidate for the Melalap state constituency. This is the same seat previously held by her father. Throughout the campaign, she has been a vocal critic of the incumbent Gabungan Rakyat Sabah (GRS) government, calling on voters to "wake up" and demand change, citing unfulfilled promises regarding infrastructure and job creation.

== Election results ==
Sabah State Legislative Assembly
Year	Constituency	Candidate	Votes	Pct	Opponent(s)	Votes	Pct	Ballots cast	Majority	Turnout
2025	N42 Melalap	Priscella Peter (KDM)		%	Cheld Bryend Lind (WARISAN)		%			
2025	N42 Melalap	Priscella Peter (KDM)		%	Jamawi Ja'afar (PKR)		%			
2025	N42 Melalap	Priscella Peter (KDM)		%	Alviana Linus (STAR)		%			
2025	N42 Melalap	Priscella Peter (KDM)		%	Junik Bajit (UPKO)		%			
2025	N42 Melalap	Priscella Peter (KDM)		%	Kelvin Chong (IMPIAN)		%			
2025	N42 Melalap	Priscella Peter (KDM)		%	Gabriel George Tulas (IND)		%			
2025	N42 Melalap	Priscella Peter (KDM)		%	Fatimah Ibrahim (IND)		%			
