= Social Democratic Harmony Party =

Political party in Sabah, Malaysia

- Malay name: Parti Kesejahteraan Demokratik Masyarakat
- Abbreviation: KDM
- President: Priscella Peter
- Deputy Presidents: Vacant (non-Muslim bumiputera); Wetrom Bahanda (Muslim bumiputera)
- Vice-Presidents: Johair Matlani; Laimon Laiki; Martin Tommy; Henry Saimpon
- Secretary-General: Willie Jude
- Treasurer-General: David Lo Ho Ping
- Information Chief: Oswald Aisat Ellik Iggau
- Founder: Peter Anthony; Juil Nuatim
- Founded: 28 January 2022; 4 years ago
- Registered: 18 February 2022; 4 years ago
- Split from: WARISAN (Peter Anthony); BERSATU (Wetrom Bahanda)
- Headquarters: Tenom, Sabah
- Women Chief: Anna Maria Bernadus
- Youth Chief: Jumardie Lukman
- Ideology: Sabah regionalism Multiracialism; Kadazandusun and Murut interests Localism
- National affiliation: Gabungan Rakyat Sabah (allied, 2022–2026); National Unity Government (since 2022)
- Dewan Negara: 0 / 70
- Dewan Rakyat: 2 / 26 (Sabah and Labuan seats)
- Sabah State Legislative Assembly: 1 / 79

The Social Democratic Harmony Party (Malay: Parti Kesejahteraan Demokratik Masyarakat; abbrev: KDM) is a regional political party based in Sabah, Malaysia founded by Peter Anthony and Juil Nuatim. It aims to represent the interests of the Kadazan-Dusun and Murut people. The KDM is currently aligned to the government as a partner, providing confidence and supply to the Gabungan Rakyat Sabah (GRS) state ruling coalition led by Chief Minister Hajiji Noor. The party's acronym, KDM, is also used to refer to the native Kadazan-Dusun and Murut communities.

== History ==
KDM was founded as a political party on 28 January 2022. Its founding President Peter Anthony, considered a political strongman in Tenom, was a Member of the Sabah State Legislative Assembly (MLA) for Melalap, State Minister of Infrastructure Development of Sabah, as well as a Vice-President of the Heritage Party (WARISAN).

Peter left WARISAN exactly a month before the founding of KDM on 28 December 2021 along with Limbahau MLA, Juil Nuatim. He claimed WARISAN "had diverted from its original path of serving Sabah" by expanding to Peninsular Malaysia, and denied that his exit was linked to an ongoing court case against him over false documents. Following Juil and Peter's exit, they were approached by the Homeland Solidarity Party (STAR), a major Kadazan-Dusun Murut party, but decided to persist with founding a new party that would be aligned with the ruling Gabungan Rakyat Sabah (GRS) coalition.

It was officially registered with the Registrar of Societies (RoS) on 18 February 2022, with Peter as president.

The party's official launch was officiated by GRS leader and Sabah Chief Minister Hajiji Noor. However, the party is not a member of the coalition, and its application has faced pushback from the United Sabah Party (PBS), another major Kadazan-Dusun Murut party.

Priscella Peter, the daughter of Peter Anthony, became president upon his conviction in court.

== Organisational structure ==
- President:
  - Priscella Peter
- Deputy Presidents:
  - Vacant (non-Muslim bumiputera)
  - Wetrom Bahanda (Muslim bumiputera)
- Vice-Presidents:
  - Johair Matlani
  - Laimon Laiki
  - Martin Tommy
  - Henry Saimpon
- Women's Wing Chief:
  - Anna Maria Bernadus
- Youth Wing Chief:
  - Jumardie Lukman
- Secretary-General:
  - Willie Jude
- Treasurer-General:
  - David Lo Ho Ping
- Information Chief:
  - Oswald Aisat Ellik Iggau

== Leadership ==
=== President ===
No.	Portrait	President	Term start	Term end	Time in office	Deputy Presidents
1		Peter Anthony (born 1971); MLA for Melalap, 2018–2025	28 January 2022	7 March 2025	3 years, 38 days	Juil Nuatim (non-Muslim bumiputera, 2022–2023); Wetrom Bahanda (Muslim bumiputera, since 2022); Priscella Peter (non-Muslim bumiputera, 2023–2025)
2		Priscella Peter (born 1998)	7 March 2025	Incumbent	1 year, 256 days	Wetrom Bahanda (Muslim bumiputera, since 2022); Vacant (non-Muslim bumiputera, since 2025)

== Elected representatives ==
=== Dewan Rakyat (House of Representatives) ===
Dewan Rakyat

2 / 222

Social Democratic Harmony Party has 2 MPs in the House of Representatives.

State	No.	Parliament constituency	Member	Party
Sabah	P168	Kota Marudu	Wetrom Bahanda	KDM
Sabah	P181	Tenom	Riduan Rubin	KDM
Sabah	Total	Sabah (2)		

=== Dewan Undangan Negeri (State Legislative Assembly) ===
==== Malaysian State Assembly Representatives ====
Sabah State Legislative Assembly

1 / 79

Social Democratic Harmony Party has 1 MLA in the Sabah State Legislative Assembly.

State	No.	Parliamentary Constituency	No.	State Assembly Constituency	Member	Party
Sabah	P179	Ranau	N38	Paginatan	Rusdin Riman	KDM
Sabah	Total	Sabah (1)				

== Government offices ==
=== State governments ===
- Sabah (2022–2023, 2023–2026)

Note: bold as Menteri Besar/Chief Minister, italic as junior partner

== Election results ==
=== General election results ===
Election	Total seats won	Seats contested	Total votes	Share of votes	Outcome of election	Election leader
2022	2 / 222	7	52,054	0.34%	▲2 seats; Governing coalition (Social Democratic Harmony Party)	Peter Anthony

=== State election results ===
Sabah State Legislative Assembly
Election	Votes		Seats			Position	Status
Election	Count	%	Result	Won / contested	+/–	Position	Status
2025	54,050	4.8	1 / 73	1 / 40	▲1	3rd	GRS–PH–BN (Note: Party board retracted support, but assemblyman supported the government.)
