= Sabah Nationality Party =

Sabah Nationality Party Parti Kebangsaan Sabah PKS
- Abbreviation: PKS
- Leader: Thomas Anggan
- Founded: 2013
- Ideology: Nationalism; Regionalism
- Colours: Green, white, red, blue and yellow

Party flag

Sabah Nationality Party or Malay: Parti Kebangsaan Sabah (PKS) is a Sabah-based-opposition party in Malaysia formed after the 2013 Malaysian general election. Following its establishment, the party contested in the 2018 Malaysian general election and 2020 Sabah state election.

== Election results ==
Sabah State Legislative Assembly
Election	Votes		Seats			Position	Status
Election	Count	%	Result	Won / contested	+/–	Position	Status
2018	2,018	0.2	0 / 60	0 / 16	Steady	8th	No seats
2020	24	0.0	0 / 73	0 / 1	Steady	▼10th	No seats
2025	1,477	0.1	0 / 73	0 / 20	Steady	▼12th	No seats

== See also ==
- Politics of Malaysia
- List of political parties in Malaysia
