= Parti Impian Sabah =

Parti Impian Sabah Sabah Dream Party
- President: Michel Alok
- Vice President I: Rakman Sakmad
- Vice President II: Sauting Rabuyot
- Vice President III: Ng Chun Sua
- Secretary general: Roslan Madali
- Founder: Michel Alok
- Headquarters: Ibu Pejabat Parti Impian Sabah, 21, Lorong Sibuga Jaya, 90000, Sandakan, Sabah
- Ideology: Sabah nationalism
- Colours: Cyan, Blue, White, Red, Purple
- Slogan: "Bersatu Bangkit Bersinar Untuk Sabah"
- Dewan Negara: 0 / 70
- Dewan Rakyat: 0 / 222
- Dewan Undangan Negeri Sabah: 0 / 73

Website
- https://partiimpiansabah.org/

The Parti Impian Sabah (English: Sabah Dream Party) is a political party based in Sabah, Malaysia.

== History ==
The party was founded in 2023 and has announced it will field 73 candidates in the 2025 Sabah state election.

== State election results ==
Sabah State Legislative Assembly
Election	Votes		Seats			Position	Status
Election	Count	%	Result	Won / contested	+/–	Position	Status
2025	13,265	1.2	0 / 73	0 / 73	Steady	9th	No seats

== See also ==
- List of political parties in Malaysia
- Politics in Malaysia
