= List of tallest buildings in Kota Kinabalu =

Kota Kinabalu in Sabah state, northern Borneo, is one of the main cities of Malaysia, and is East Malaysia's most important economic centre. According to the Council on Tall Buildings and Urban Habitat (CTBUH) as of 2024, Kota Kinabalu has three skyscrapers exceeding 150 m (492 ft) in height.

As the fastest growing city in East Malaysia, Kota Kinabalu is home to East Malaysia's first skyscraper, the Tun Mustapha Tower, which was completed in 1977.

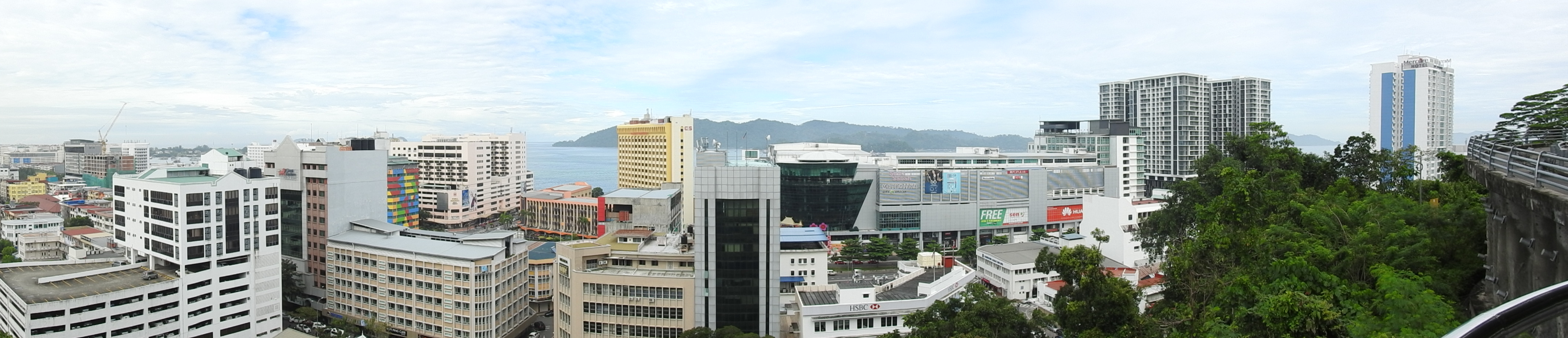
Panoramic view of the booming of both low-rise and high-rise buildings in the city metropolitan area of Kota Kinabalu.

To date, most of the tallest buildings and skyscrapers in the island of Borneo are located in Greater Kota Kinabalu, such as the 192.15-metre Jesselton Twin Towers. Several skyscrapers over 145 metres are currently under construction, including the four towers at The V @ Jesselton, Bayu Residences @ Damai Likas, and The Logg's Shorea & Astoria twin towers.

== Overview ==
Kota Kinabalu was formerly known as Jesselton under the British protectorate of North Borneo and its successor the British Crown Colony of North Borneo. The city has been undergoing rapid development ever since its devastation by bombings during World War II, when only three buildings were left standing.

The city urbanised area today encompasses the wide area of Greater Kota Kinabalu which goes beyond the city boundary on the south side into two West Coast districts of Penampang and Putatan, and to a lesser but growing extent into the districts of Papar (38 kilometres to the south) and Tuaran (34 kilometres to the north).

== Tallest buildings completed or topped out ==
Current tallest building in Kota Kinabalu and Borneo island
Once the tallest building in Kota Kinabalu

High-rise buildings and skyscrapers in Greater Kota Kinabalu of 20 storeys and above
Rank	Building	Image	Height m (ft)	Floors	Year completed	Constituency within GKK	Notes	References
1	Jesselton Twin Towers Tower A		192.15 metres (630.4 ft)	56	2023	Kota Kinabalu	The tallest building in Kota Kinabalu as well as Borneo island	
1	Jesselton Twin Towers Tower B		192.15 metres (630.4 ft)	56	2023	Kota Kinabalu	The tallest building in Kota Kinabalu as well as Borneo island	
2	Kinabalu Tower		150 m (490 ft)+	33	2016	Sepanggar		
3	Bay Suites		131.4 metres (431 ft)	37	2024	Kota Kinabalu		
4	Jesselton Quay Citypads Tower 1			33	2021	Kota Kinabalu		
4	Jesselton Quay Citypads Tower 2			33	2021	Kota Kinabalu		
5	Harrington Suites			31	2017	Kota Kinabalu		
6	1Sulaman Platinum Tower			31	2022	Sepanggar		
7	Tun Mustapha Tower		122 metres (400 ft)	30	c. 1970s	Sepanggar	First Skyscraper in Borneo Island	
8	Bay 21			30	2015	Kota Kinabalu		
9	1Borneo Tower A Condominium			29	2009	Sepanggar		
9	1Borneo Tower B Condominium			29	2009	Sepanggar		
9	Ashton Tower			29	2017	Sepanggar		
9	The Gardens at Bundusan Tower A			29	2017	Penampang		
9	The Gardens at Bundusan Tower B			29	2017	Penampang		
10	Sabah Apartment @ 1Borneo			28	2011	Sepanggar		
10	The Peak Vista			28	2012	Kota Kinabalu		
10	Jesselton Residences Tower A		96 metres (315 ft)	28	2017	Kota Kinabalu		
10	Jesselton Residences Tower B		96 metres (315 ft)	28	2017	Kota Kinabalu		
10	Jesselton Residences Tower C		96 metres (315 ft)	28	2017	Kota Kinabalu		
10	Kingfisher Inanam Tower B			28	2019	Sepanggar		
10	Kingfisher Inanam Tower C			28	2019	Sepanggar		
10	Forest Hill Residences			28	2024	Penampang		
11	Lido Avenue Tower A			27	2016	Kota Kinabalu		
11	Lido Avenue Tower B			27	2016	Kota Kinabalu		
11	Maya @ Likas		95.2 metres (312 ft)	27	2019	Kota Kinabalu		
11	Dilenia Tower @Bukit Bantayan Residences			27	2020	Sepanggar		
12	The Shore KK		94 metres (308 ft)	26	2022	Kota Kinabalu		
12	Sheraton Kota Kinabalu Hotel		112 metres (367 ft)	26	2025	Kota Kinabalu		
12	Eco Peak Residence			26	2026	Penampang		
13	The Bay Residence			25	2016	Kota Kinabalu		
13	Mercure KK City Centre			25	2017	Kota Kinabalu		
13	Cemara Tower @Bukit Bantayan Residences			25	2019	Sepanggar		
13	Ebena Tower @Bukit Bantayan Residences		86 metres (282 ft)	25	2019	Sepanggar		
13	Kingfisher Inanam Tower A			25	2019	Sepanggar		
13	Elemen Utara Precinct 2 Tower A			25	2021	Sepanggar		
13	Elemen Utara Precinct 2 Tower B			25	2024	Sepanggar		
14	Damar Residence @Tropika Park City			24	2026	Papar		
15	SkyVue Residence			23	2019	Penampang		
15	SkyMillion Residence			23	2025	Penampang		
16	The Light Residence			22	2016	Penampang		
16	Tropicana Landmark Condominium			22	2015	Penampang		
16	Hyatt Centric Kota Kinabalu			22	2022	Kota Kinabalu	First Hyatt Centric in Southeast Asia region.	
16	K Avenue Tower A		86 metres (282 ft)	22	2022	Penampang		
16	K Avenue Tower B		86 metres (282 ft)	22	2022	Penampang		
17	PPR Gayang Ria 2			21	2021	Tuaran		
17	K Avenue Tower C			21	2022	Penampang		
18	Vetro 11		74.83 metres (245.5 ft)	20	2024	Kota Kinabalu		
18	Emerald Tower @Alam Pesona		70 metres (230 ft)	20	2024	Putatan		

== Buildings under construction ==
High-rise buildings (12 storeys and above) currently under construction
Rank	Building	Height (m / ft)	Floors
1	Tower A @The V Jesselton	148 metres (486 ft)	41
2	Tower B @The V Jesselton	148 metres (486 ft)	41
3	Tower C @The V Jesselton	148 metres (486 ft)	41
4	YS tower @The V Jesselton	148 metres (486 ft)	41
5	Shorea tower @The Logg Luyang	145.69 metres (478.0 ft)	40
6	Astoria tower @The Logg Luyang	145.69 metres (478.0 ft)	40
7	Parkhill Residence @The Logg Luyang		39
8	Tower A1 @ Kayana Heights Ayuria Place		39
9	Tower A2 @ Kayana Heights Ayuria Place		39
10	Tower A @Bayu Residences Damai Likas	160.05 metres (525.1 ft)	39
11	Avani Hotel @The Logg Luyang		37
12	LikasVue	138 metres (453 ft)	37
13	Tower B1 @Lumi Residence 360 Bundusan	128 metres (420 ft)	37
14	Tower B2 @Lumi Residence 360 Bundusan	128 metres (420 ft)	37
15	Tower B3 @Lumi Residence 360 Bundusan	128 metres (420 ft)	37
16	Tower B @Bayu Residences Damai Likas	146.15 metres (479.5 ft)	35
17	ARIA @Banyan Valley		35
18	Tower A @88 Avenue		35
19	Tower B1 @88 Avenue		35
20	Tower C @88 Avenue		35
21	Tower D @88 Avenue		35
22	Tower A @Grand Meridian	110.65 metres (363.0 ft)	32
23	Tower B @Grand Meridian	110.65 metres (363.0 ft)	32
24	Aris tower @The Peninsula KK		31
25	The Monarch @Bedrock		31
26	Amara Residence @Likas		31
27	Agate tower @The Peninsula KK	128.1 metres (420 ft)	30
28	Sky88 Residences phase 1		30
29	Tower A @Bedrock		29
30	Peninsula Grandis	120.5 metres (395 ft)	28
31	Q Suites @Jesselton Quay		28
32	Infinity Suites @Boulevard 360 Bundusan		28
33	Tower B @Bedrock		27
34	Hotel tower @Bedrock		24
35	Hotel tower @Suria Sabah Phase		24
36	SkyWalker Condominium @Kobusak		23
37	EG Tower @EG Penampang		21
38	Oakwood @Metro Town		21
39	EG Suites @EG Penampang		21
40	Sapphire tower @Alam Pesona		21
41	Rise Residences tower A		20
42	Rise Residences tower B		20
43	Tower 2 @InterContinental Resort Melinsung	88 metres (289 ft)	20
44	Kimpton Hotel @Tanjung Aru		19
45	Tower A @Parklane Residences Benoni		19
46	Tower B @Parklane Residences Benoni		19
47	The Horizon @Damai		18
48	Damai Suites		16
49	Block 3 @V21 Residence Phase 1 stage 2		16
50	Block 5 @V21 Residence Phase 1 stage 2		16
51	Block 7 @V21 Residence Phase 1 stage 2		16
52	Block 8 @V21 Residence Phase 1 stage 2		16
53	The Westfield Suites @Putatan		13
54	Pembinaan Bangunan Tambahan Wisma Laskar Di PTKK		12
55	Kingston Hotel		12

== Buildings under planning status ==
Rank	Building	Floors
1	Solaris Suites @Likas	48+
2	The Westbourne @Luyang	36
3	Gemilia Suites tower 2 @Menggatal	35
4	Hotel next to Hyatt Centric	31
5	Wisma Tiong Hwa	28
6	Kopeks Saujana @Menggatal	28
7	The Eminence @Signal Hill	25
8	Gemilia Suites tower 1 @Menggatal	23
9	Sabah Tourism building	22
10	J' Vantage Residence	20
11	The Hill Suite	20
12	Sri Digot Residence @Penampang	16
13	Arus Nova @Tanjung Aru	12

== Buildings abandoned or on hold ==
Rank	Building	Height (m / ft)	Floors
1	Tower 1 @1 Sulaman Gold Tower		35
2	Tower 2 @1 Sulaman Gold Tower		35
3	Pacificity Residence		19
4	Tower A @Triconic Tower		18
5	Tower B @Triconic Tower		18
6	Tower C @Triconic Tower		18
7	Serviced apartment @The Crown KK		14
8	Crowne Plaza KK		14

== See also ==
- List of tallest buildings in Malaysia
- List of tallest buildings in Kuala Lumpur
- List of tallest buildings in George Town
- List of tallest buildings in Johor Bahru
- Senarai bangunan tertinggi di Kuching
