= Tun Mustapha Tower =

Skyscraper in Kota Kinabalu, Sabah, Malaysia

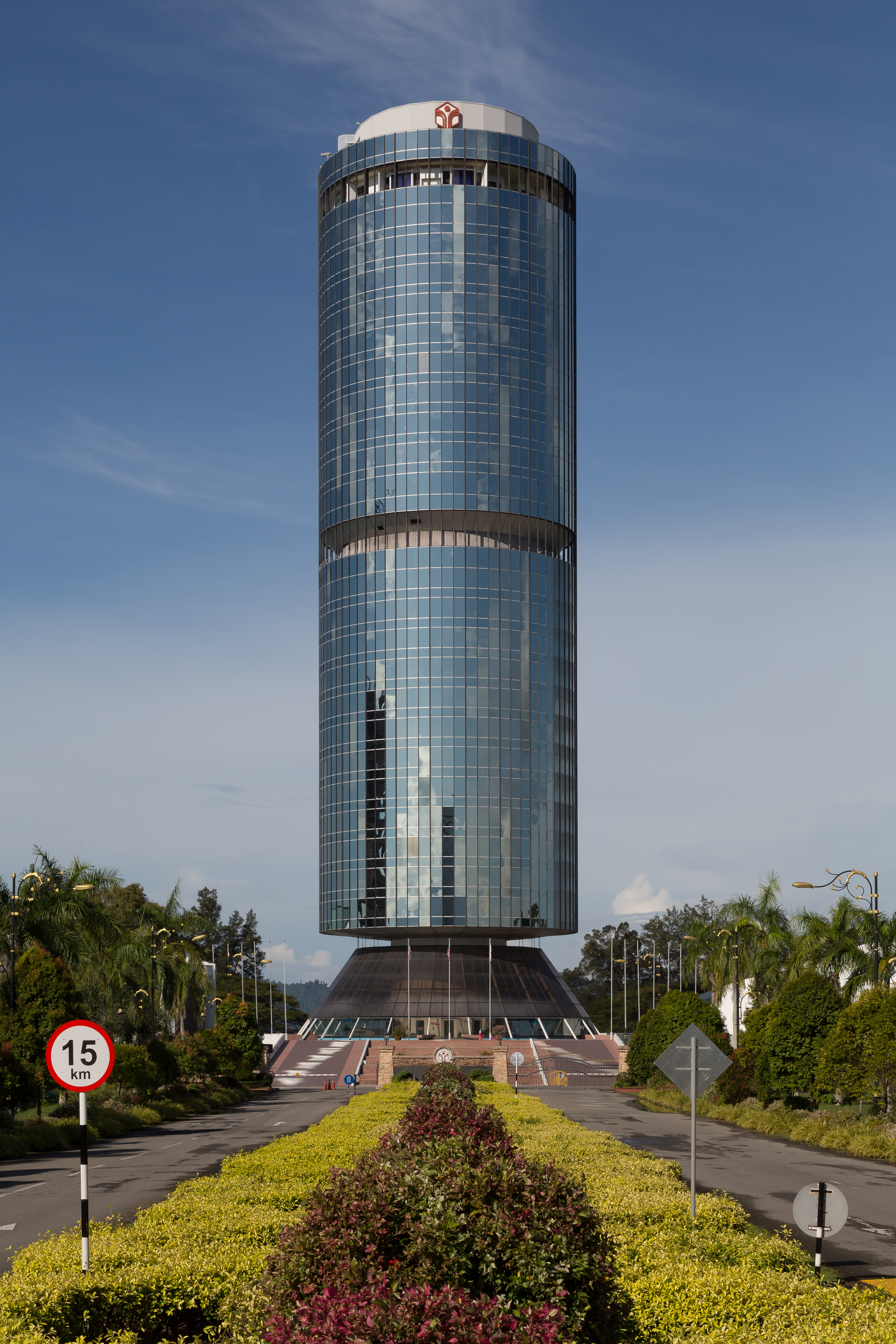

General information
- Status: Completed
- Type: Office, restaurant, library and museum
- Location: Likas, Kota Kinabalu, Sabah, Malaysia
- Coordinates: 6°1′2″N 116°6′34″E
- Completed: Unknown
- Opening: 1977
- Cost: (US$20 million) RM 38 million
- Owner: Sabah Foundation

Height
- Roof: 122 m (400 ft)

Technical details
- Floor count: 30
- Lifts/elevators: 18

Design and construction
- Developer: Mori Building Co.

References
- Architects: James Ferrie & Partners, Singapore and Kota Kinabalu.

Tun Mustapha Tower (Malay: Menara Tun Mustapha) is a 30-storey, 122 m (400 ft) tall glass skyscraper in Kota Kinabalu, Sabah, Malaysia. It was built in 1976 by Mori Building Company, a Japanese property development and management firm. The building was formerly named Yayasan Sabah Tower as it housed the Sabah Foundation (Yayasan Sabah), a state-sponsored foundation to promote education and economic development in the state. In 2001, the tower was renamed to honor Datu Mustapha Datu Harun, a former Sabah chief minister and state governor.

There is a revolving floor on the 18th floor, which slowly spins to give a complete view of the Likas Bay. It makes one 360 degree rotation per hour.

On 20 April 1997, urban climber Alain Robert successfully scaled the building, with government approval, for a fundraiser. He began climbing from the 16th floor and reached the top of the building in just five minutes.

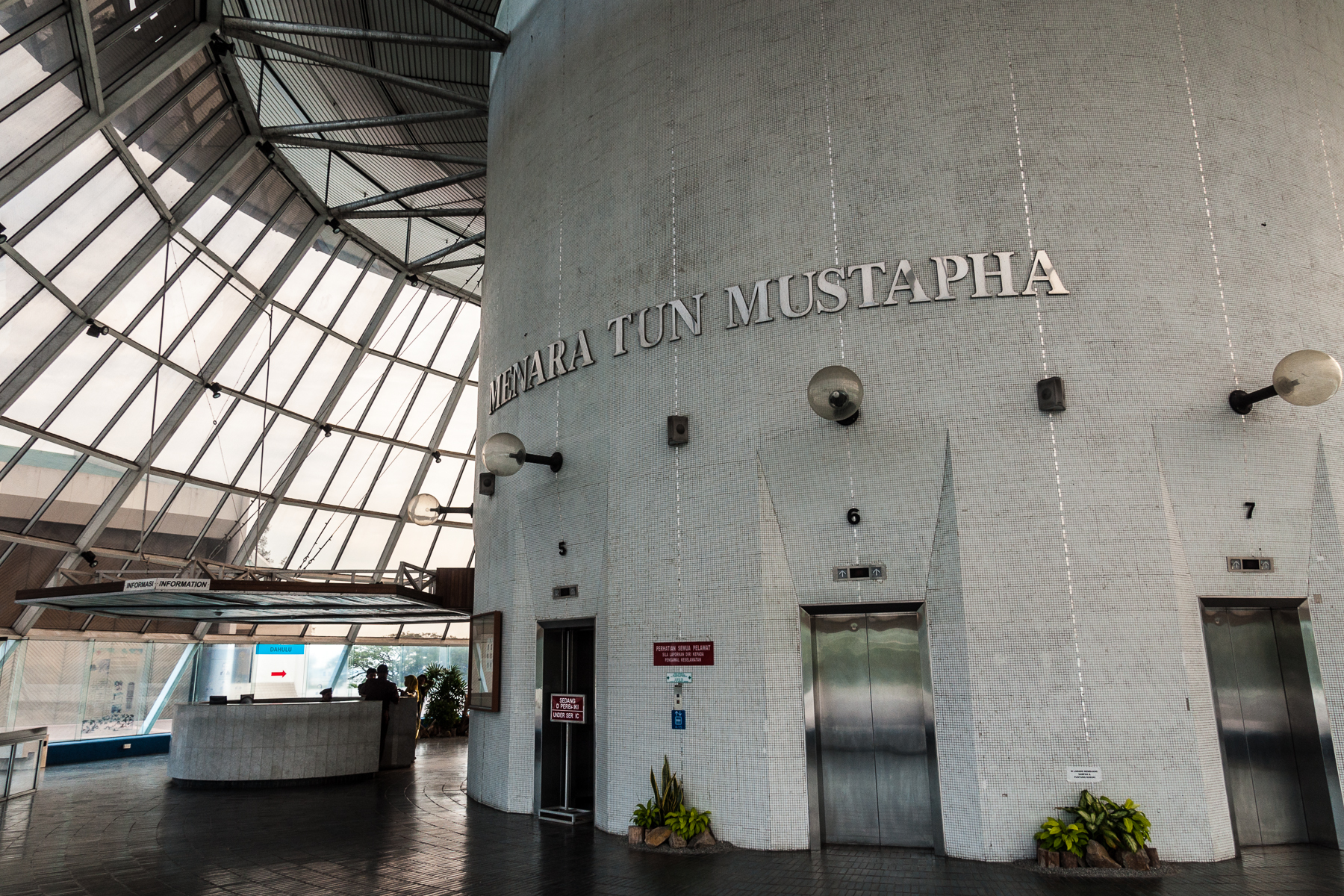
The interior

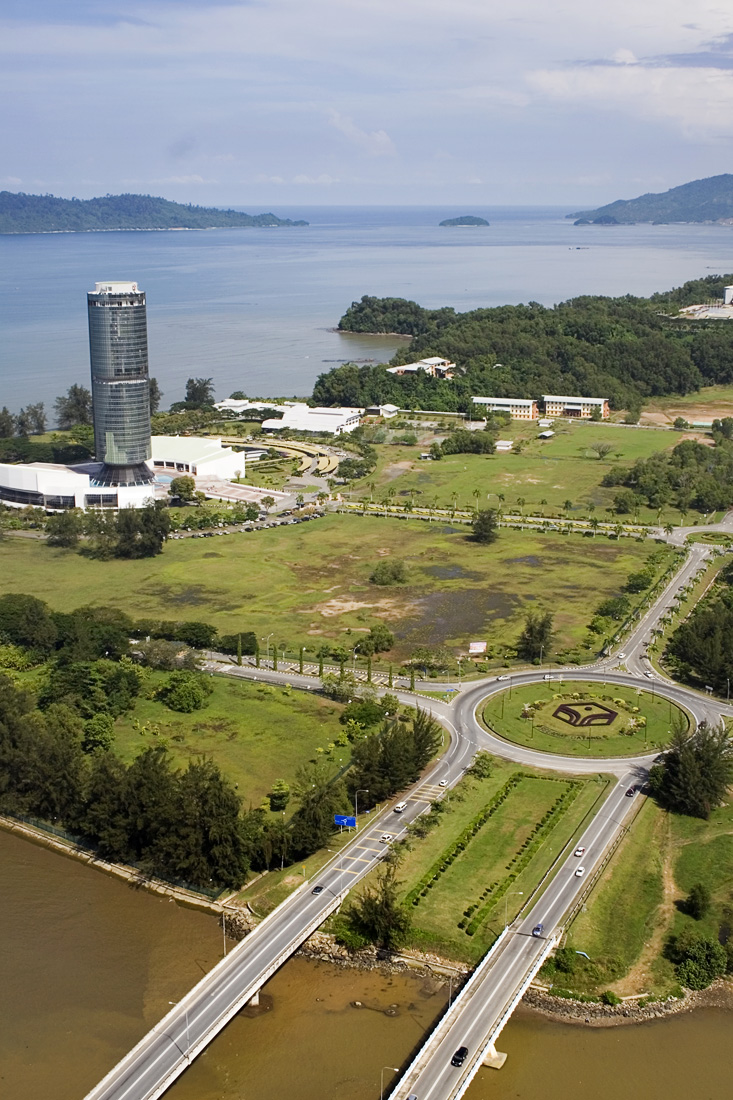
Aerial view

== See also ==
- List of tallest buildings in Kota Kinabalu
- Sabah State Legislative Assembly Building
- Wisma Innoprise
- Kinabalu Tower
- Jesselton Twin Towers
