= Wisma Innoprise =

Government building in Kota Kinabalu, Sabah, Malaysia

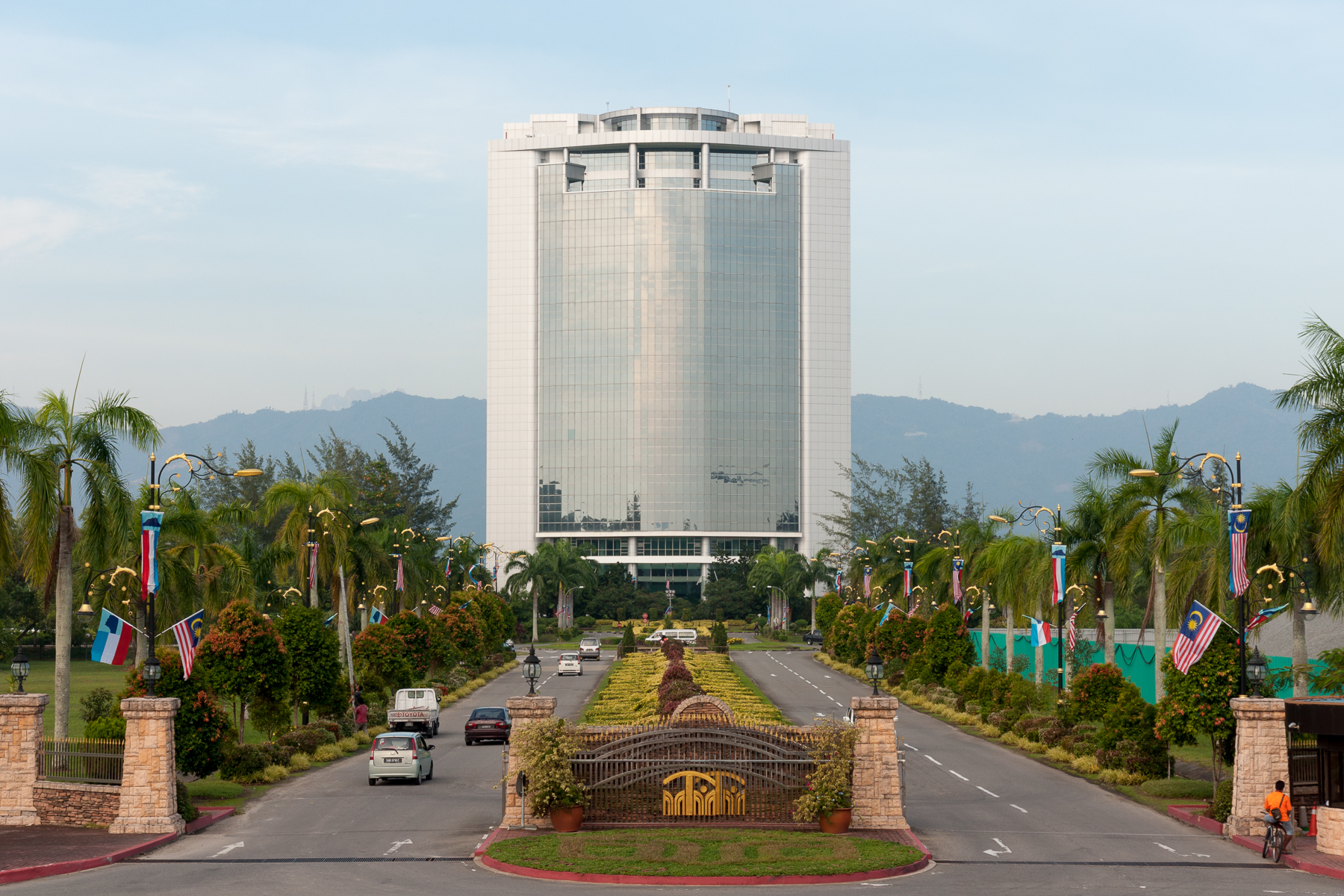
- Interactive map of the Wisma Innoprise area

General information
- Status: Completed
- Type: Government offices
- Location: Kota Kinabalu, Sabah, Malaysia
- Coordinates: 6°1′2″N 116°6′50″E
- Owner: Sabah state government

Design and construction
- Developer: Innoprise Corporation Sdn. Bhd

Wisma Innoprise is one of the office complex buildings for the Sabah state government. This building was built by Innoprise Corporation Sdn. Bhd (ICSB), an investment arm of Yayasan Sabah (Sabah Foundation). This building houses the offices for ICSB and also a few state government departments or ministries.

== See also ==
- Kinabalu Tower
- Wisma Tun Fuad Stephens
- Tun Mustapha Tower
- Sabah State Legislative Assembly Building
