= Chief Minister's Department =

Chief Minister's Department may refer to:

- Chief Minister, Treasury and Economic Development Directorate, previously known as the Chief Minister's Department
- Chief Minister's Department (Sabah)
- Chief Minister's Department in Jersey
