= One Jesselton Waterfront =

Building in Kota Kinabalu, Sabah, Malaysia

- Interactive map of the One Jesselton Waterfront area

General information
- Status: Terminated
- Location: Sabah, Kota Kinabalu, Malaysia
- Coordinates: 5.9907°N 116.0791°E
- Cost: MYR1.8 billion
- Owner: Gabungan AQRS Berhad; Suria Group

Website
- www.gbg.com.my/one-jesselton-waterfront

The One Jesselton Waterfront is a mixed development project comprising a shopping and entertainment centre, condominium and offices in Kota Kinabalu, Sabah, Malaysia. Together with the Jesselton Quay, Kota Kinabalu City Waterfront and Kota Kinabalu Convention City which is developed by other developers, it is part of waterfront revitalisation projects to transform Kota Kinabalu into a metropolitan city. Similar to the Jesselton Quay, the project total is around MYR1.8 billion. The project was terminated on 30 September 2021 by Gabungan AQRS due to the pandemic.
