= Jesselton Twin Towers =

Skyscraper in Kota Kinabalu, Sabah, Malaysia

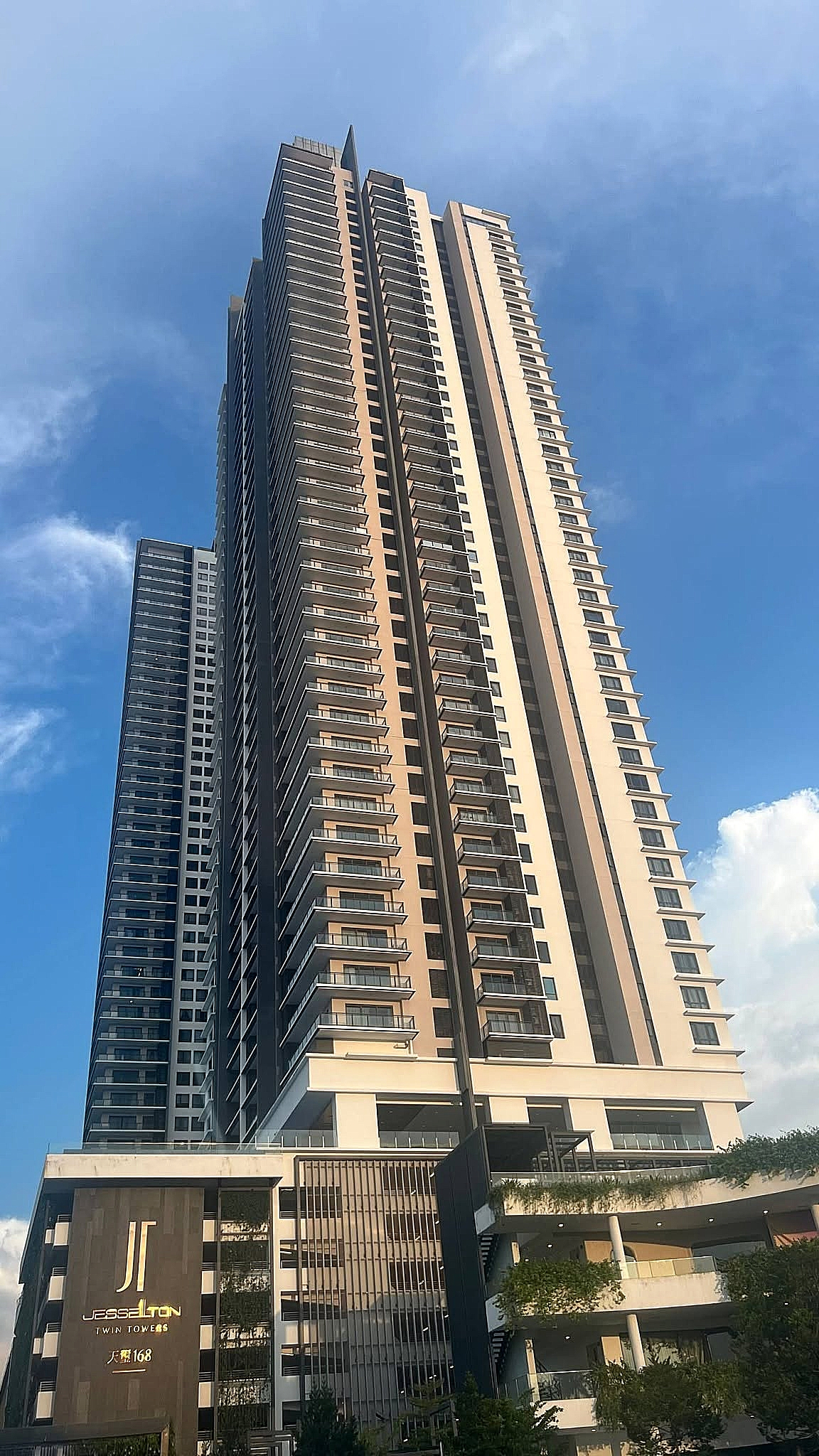
- The 56-storey tall Jesselton Twin Towers

Record height
- Tallest in Borneo since 2023^{[I]}
- Preceded by: Kinabalu Tower

General information
- Status: Completed
- Type: Twin residential condominium
- Location: Off Jalan Bersatu, Damai, 88300 Kota Kinabalu, Sabah
- Coordinates: 5.9662°N 116.0979°E
- Construction started: 2018
- Completed: Tower B = 26 Dec 2022 / Tower A = 15 Feb 2023

Height
- Height: 192.15 m (630.4 ft)

Technical details
- Floor count: 56
- Floor area: 3,229 m^{2} (34,760 sq ft)

Design and construction
- Architects: Arkitek Billings Leong & Tan Sdn. Bhd. UIG Architects Sdn Bhd
- Developer: Jesselton Properties Sdn Berhad
- Main contractor: China State Construction Engineering (M) Sdn Bhd

Website
- www.jesseltontwintowers.com

Jesselton Twin Towers (Malay: Menara Berkembar Jesselton) is a 56-storey, 192-meter-tall twin skyscraper in Kota Kinabalu, Sabah, Malaysia. Tower B was completed in 26 December 2022 and Tower A was completed in 15 February 2023. It had surpassed Kinabalu Tower as the tallest building in Sabah as well as in Borneo.

== Facilities ==
The Jesselton Twin Towers is planned to be the first buildings in Borneo to be equipped with high-speed elevators, made by Mitsubishi.

The recreation deck will be located on the tenth floor with facilities such as a gym room, a 50-metre-long (160 ft) swimming pool, jacuzzi, function room, sauna and steam room, and children playground. There will also be sky facilities on the 54th and 55th level, which consists of skydeck, skygarden, multipurpose hall, lounge and library.

The skydeck is due to be the tallest skydeck in Borneo, overlooking Likas Bay and Mount Kinabalu which is the tallest mountain in Borneo and Malaysia.

== See also ==
- List of tallest buildings in Malaysia
- List of tallest buildings in Kota Kinabalu
- Kinabalu Tower
- Tun Mustapha Tower
- Jesselton Residences
