= Kinabalu Tower =

Kinabalu Tower (Sabah State Administrative Centre)
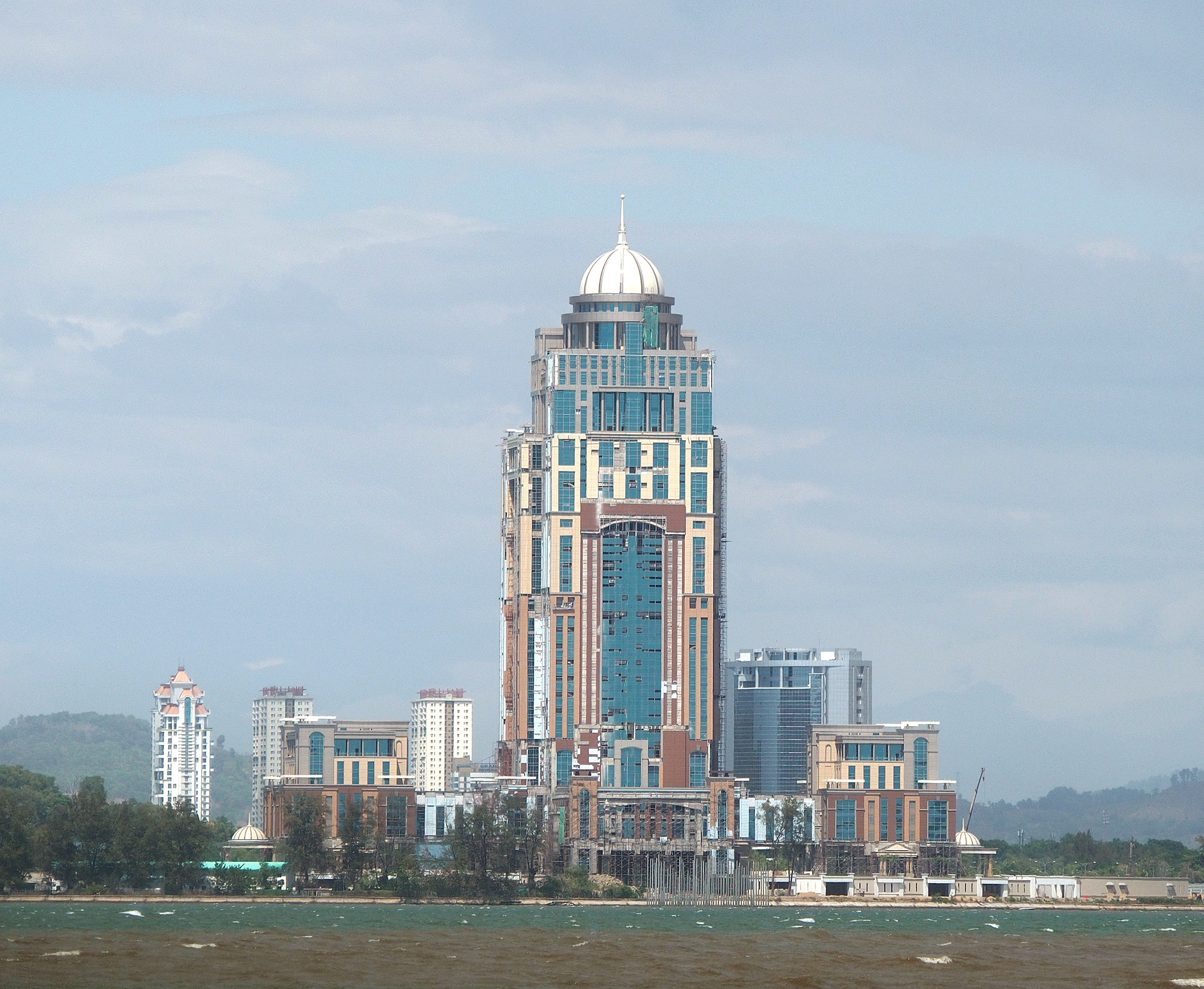
- Kinabalu Tower (Menara Kinabalu).
- Interactive map of the Kinabalu Tower (Sabah State Administrative Centre) area

Record height
- Tallest in Borneo from 2016 to 2022^{[I]}
- Preceded by: Tun Mustapha Tower
- Surpassed by: Jesselton Twin Towers

General information
- Status: Completed
- Type: Office
- Location: Kota Kinabalu, Malaysia
- Coordinates: 6°0′54″N 116°6′39″E
- Completed: Around December 2016
- Opening: 2017
- Cost: Total estimated cost RM600 million: Basic structure RM470 million; Internal design RM130 million
- Owner: Sabah State Government

Height
- Architectural: 132 m (433 ft)
- Antenna spire: 13 m (43 ft)
- Top floor: 124 m (407 ft)

Technical details
- Size: 60,000 m²
- Floor count: 33

Design and construction
- Developer: Bina Puri

Kinabalu Tower, also known as Sabah State Administrative Centre, is a 33-storey, 132-meter-tall, government office complex building in Kota Kinabalu, Sabah, Malaysia. It is Kota Kinabalu and Borneo's second tallest building.

The complex consists of a single 33-storey office tower and two 9-storey office buildings that house the state's chief minister's office and other state government cabinet members. The construction commenced in August 2011 and was scheduled to complete in 30 months, however additional works and interior works would be completed later in around December 2016. After completion, the tower and the Sabah State Administrative Centre were handed over to the Sabah State Government, and government services would open in 2017.

Today, the 33-storey office tower is the second tallest building in Borneo just after the Jesselton Twin Towers, which is in the same city.

== See also ==
- List of tallest buildings in Kota Kinabalu
- Tun Mustapha Tower
- Wisma Innoprise
- Jesselton Twin Towers

== Gallery ==
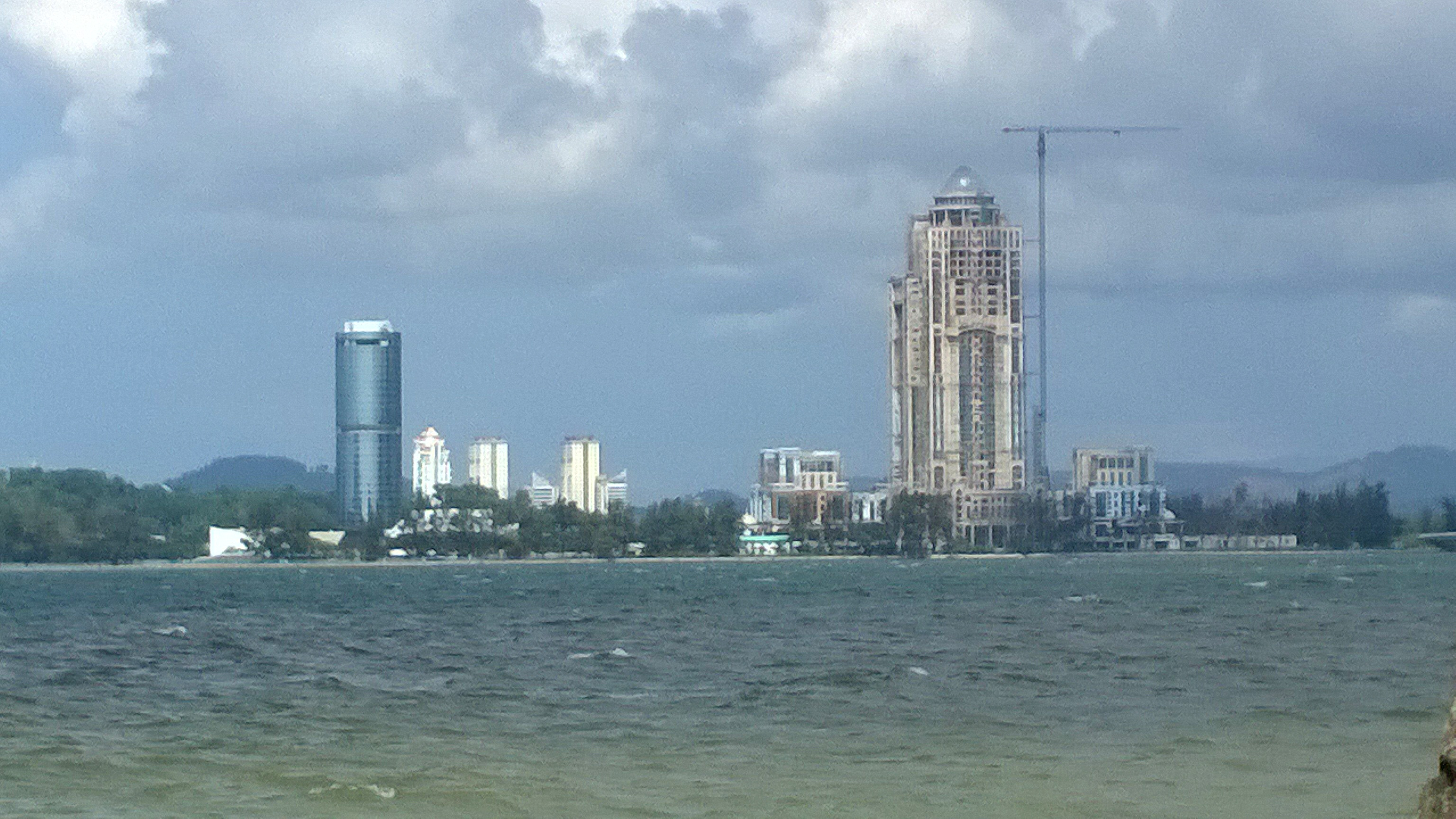
Construction site of the Sabah State Administrative Centre as seen from the other side of the bay on 31 January 2015.

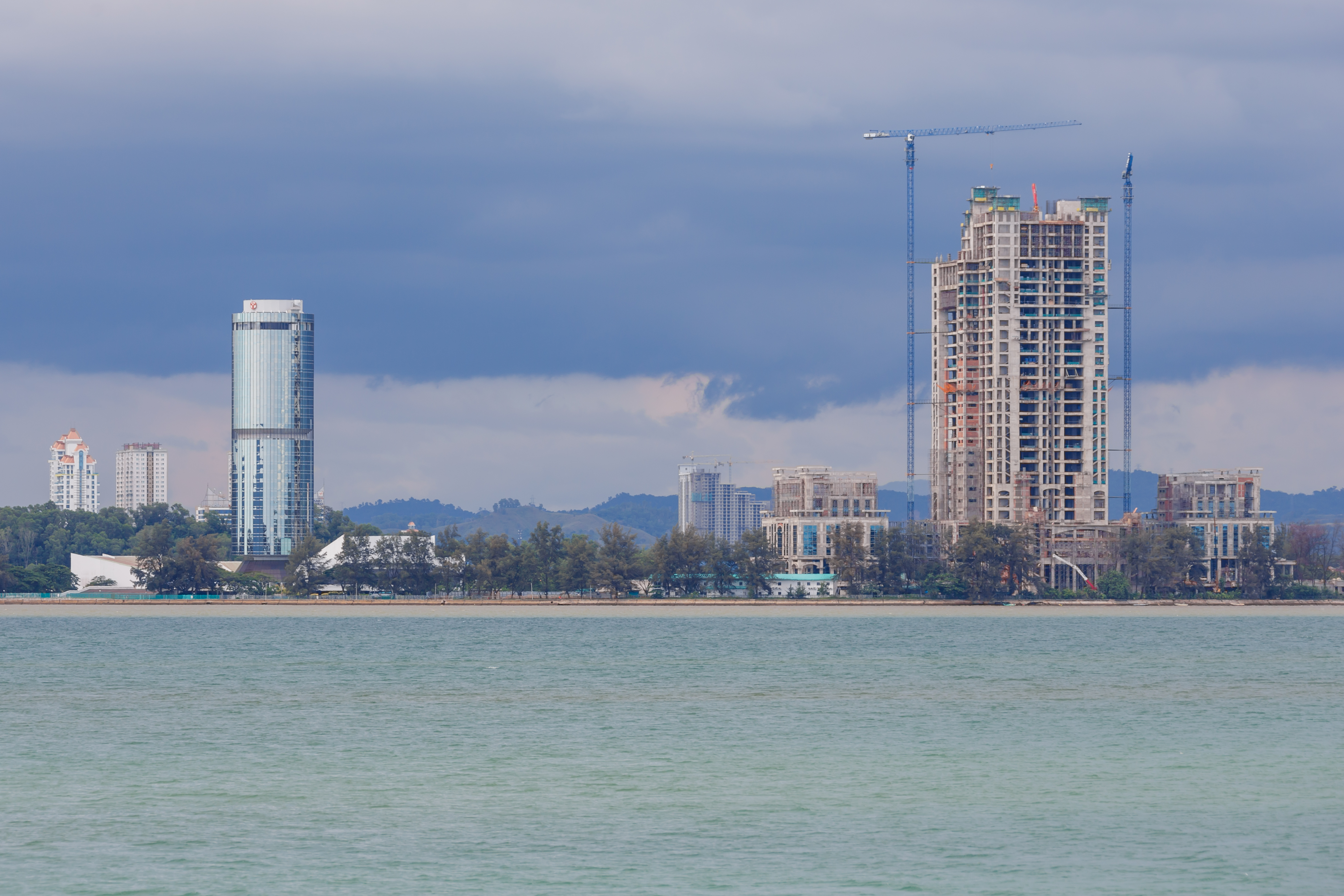
The working site of the Sabah State Administrative Centre (right) in early 2014. On the left is the 32 storey Tun Mustapha Tower, the former tallest building in Sabah.

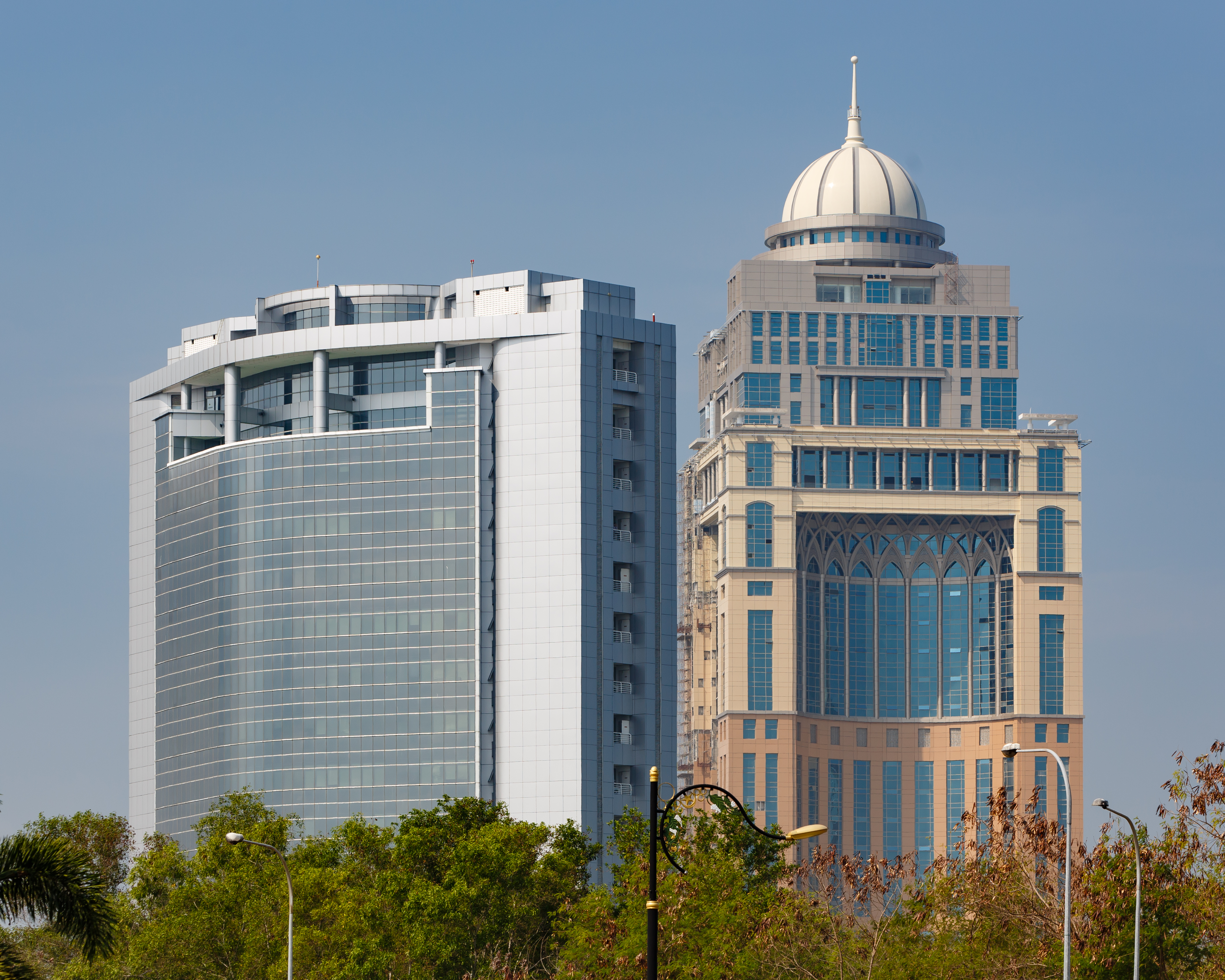
The Sabah State Administrative Centre today
