= Government of Sabah =

Sabah State Government
- Kerajaan Negeri Sabah
- State government

Overview
- Established: 31 August 1963 (63 years ago)
- State: Sabah
- Leader: Chief Minister Hajiji Noor
- Appointed by: Governor Musa Hitam
- Main organ: Cabinet of Sabah
- Ministries: 10
- Responsible to: Sabah State Legislative Assembly
- Annual budget: RM 6.402 billion (2026)
- Headquarters: Kinabalu Tower, Kota Kinabalu
- Website: www.sabah.gov.my

The Sabah State Government is an authority governing Sabah, one of Borneo states of Malaysia, based in Kota Kinabalu, the state capital. The state government adheres to and is created by both the Federal Constitution of Malaysia, the supreme law of Malaysia, and the Constitution of the State of Sabah, the supreme law of the State.

The state government has only two branches: executive and legislative. Sabah has no judiciary branch due to the federalisation of court system in Malaysia. Although Sabah has jurisdictions towards Sharia and Native Courts (and their respective laws), both courts are still considered a part of the state executive branch.

== Legislative ==
The state legislature consists of only a unicameral house called the State Legislative Assembly. All 60 members of the Assembly are elected from single-member districts by universal adult suffrage. The Assembly follows a multi-party system and the governing body is elected through a first-past-the-post system. The State may appoint up to six nominated members of the Assembly based on conditions provided by the State Constitution.

The Assembly has a maximum mandate of five years by law. The Yang di-Pertua Negeri may dissolve the state legislature at any time and usually does so upon the advice of the Chief Minister.

== Executive ==
=== Cabinet ===
Executive power is vested in the Cabinet led by the Chief Minister. The State Constitution stipulates that the Chief Minister must be a member of the State Legislative Assembly who, in the opinion of the Yang di-Pertua Negeri, commands a majority in the State Legislative Assembly. The Cabinet is chosen among members of the State Legislative Assembly and is responsible to that body. The executive branch of the government consists of the Chief Minister as the head of the government, followed by the various ministers of the Cabinet.

=== Ministries and agencies ===
Since 1 February 2023, Sabah State Government comprises the following ministries, which subsequently divided to following agencies:

Ministry	State agencies	Additional charge of Federal matters
Chief Minister's Department	State departments: Chief Minister's Department; State Palace; Chief Minister's Office; Office of the State Secretary; Office of the Deputy State Secretary (Administration); Office of the Deputy State Secretary (Development); Office of the Deputy State Secretary (Special Functions); Cabinet and Policy Division (BKD); Community Development Leaders' Unit (UPPM); Government Printing Department (JCK); Internal Affairs and Research Office (PHEDNP); Management and Finance Division (BPK); Natural Resources Office (PHB); Press and Publications Office (PAP); Protocol and Ceremony Division (BIP); Sabah State Integrity Unit; Sabah State Liaison Office, Kuala Lumpur (PPNSKL); State Legislative Assembly (Website); State Public Service Commission (SPANS); State Attorney-General's Chambers (SAGC); Kota Kinabalu City Hall (DBKK) (Website); Sabah Forestry Department; Sabah Lands and Surveys Department (JTU); Sabah State Archives Department; Sabah State Public Service Department (JPAN); State Economic Planning Unit (UPEN); Office of the State Mufti (PMNS); Sabah State Islamic Affairs Department (JHEAINS); Sabah State Syariah Judiciary Department (JKSNS); State statutory bodies: Sabah Biodiversity Centre (SaBC); Sabah Economic Development and Investment Authority (SEDIA) (Website); Sabah Forest Development Authority (SAFODA); Sabah Foundation (YS) (Website); Sabah Land Development Board (SLDB); Sabah State Baitulmal Corporation (PBNS); Sabah State Islamic Affairs Council (MUIS); Tun Fuad Foundation (YTF); State-owned companies: Institute for Development Studies (IDS); MLGH (Sabah) Sdn. Bhd.; Sabah Energy Corporation Sdn. Bhd.; Sabah Forest Industries Sdn. Bhd. (SFI); Sawit Kinabalu Bhd.	Islamic religious affairs; Defence; Foreign affairs; Internal security; Other Federal matters (except transportation, culture, arts, tourism, co-operatives, agriculture and agro-based industry, rural and regional development, infrastructure, education, trade, youth and sports affairs, industry, communications, information technology)
Ministry of Agriculture, Fisheries and Food Industries	State departments: Department of Fisheries (DOF); Department of Irrigation and Drainage (DID); Department of Veterinary Services (DVS); State statutory bodies: Rural Development Corporation (KPD); Sabah Fishermen and Fishery Development Corporation (KO-NELAYAN); Sabah Rubber Industry Board (LIGS)	Agriculture and agro-based industry
Ministry of Women, Health and Community Wellbeing	State departments: Department of Women Affairs (JHEWA); Department of General Welfare Service (JPKA); State statutory bodies: Sabah Social Service Council (MPMS)	Women and family development; Consumer affairs; Unity and national integration; Health; Non-Muslim affairs
Ministry of Finance	State departments: State Treasurer's Department (JBN); State statutory bodies: Sabah Credit Corporation (SCC); State-owned companies: Borneo Development Corporation (Sabah) Sdn. Bhd. (BDC); Borneo Housing Mortgage Finance Bhd. (BHMF); Desa Group of Companies; Koperasi Jelata Sabah Bhd. (KOJASA); Permodalan Bumiputra Sabah Bhd. (PBSB); Progressive Insurance Bhd.; Sabah Air Aviation Sdn. Bhd. (Website); Sabah Development Bank Bhd. (SDB); Saham Sabah Bhd. (SSB); Warisan Harta Sabah Sdn. Bhd. (WHSSB); Yayasan Bumiputera Sabah Bhd. (YBS); Yayasan Usaha Maju (YUM)	Finance and treasury
Ministry of Industrial Development, Trade, Entrepreneurship and Transport	State departments: State Railway Department (Website); Ports and Harbours Department (JPDS); Department of Industrial Development and Research (DIDR); State statutory boards: Sabah Economic Development Corporation (SEDCO); Sabah Ports Authority (LPPS); State-owned companies: Invest Sabah; Kota Kinabalu Industrial Park Sdn. Bhd. (KKIP); POIC Sabah Sdn. Bhd.; Sabah Oil and Gas Development Corporation Sdn. Bhd. (SOGDC)	Investment; Trade, co-operatives and industry; Transportation
Ministry of Local Government and Housing	State departments: Department of Native Affairs (JHEAN); Department of Town and Country Planning (JPBW); Sabah Native Affairs Council (MHEANS); Urban and Housing Development Board (LPPB); State statutory bodies: Beaufort District Council; Beluran District Council; Keningau District Council; Kinabatangan District Council; Kota Belud District Council; Kota Marudu District Council; Kuala Penyu District Council; Kudat Town Board; Kunak District Council; Lahad Datu District Council; Nabawan District Council; Papar District Council; Penampang Municipal Council (MPP); Pitas District Council; Ranau District Council; Sandakan Municipal Council (MPS); Semporna District Council; Sipitang District Council; Tambunan District Council; Tawau Municipal Council (MPT); Telupid District Council; Tenom District Council; Tuaran District Council; Tongod District Council	Local government; Housing; Fire and rescue services
Ministry of Rural Development	State departments: Beaufort District Office; Membakut Subdistrict Office; Beluran District Office; Paitan Subdistrict Office; Keningau District Office; Sook Subdistrict Office; Kinabatangan District Office; Kota Belud District Office; Kota Marudu District Office; Kuala Penyu District Office; Menumbok Subdistrict Office; Kudat District Office; Banggi Subdistrict Office; Matunggong Subdistrict Office; Kunak District Office; Lahad Datu District Office; Tungku Subdistrict Office; Nabawan District Office; Pagalungan Subdistrict Office; Papar District Office; Penampang District Office; Putatan Subdistrict Office; Pitas District Office; Ranau District Office; Semporna District Office; Sipitang District Office; Tambunan District Office; Tawau District Office; Kalabakan Subdistrict Office; Telupid District Office; Tenom District Office; Kemabong Subdistrict Office; Tongod District Office; Tuaran District Office; Kiulu Subdistrict Office; Tamparuli Subdistrict Office	Rural and regional development; District administration
Ministry of Education, Science, Technology and Innovation	State departments: State Computer Services Department (JPKN); Human Resources Development Department (JPSM); Sabah State Library (PNS); State-owned companies: Sabah Net Sdn. Bhd.; Sabah Skills and Technology Centre (SSTC); Sabah Creative Economy and Innovation Centre (SCENIC)	Education; Multimedia; Communications; Digital
Ministry of Tourism, Culture and Environment	State departments: Sabah Environment Protection Department (JPAS); Sabah Museum Department; Sabah Wildlife Department (Website); State statutory boards: Sabah Parks (Website); Sabah Cultural Board (LKNS); Sabah Tourism Board (STB)	Tourism, culture and environment
Ministry of Public Works and Utilities	State departments: Public Works Department (JKR); State Water Department (JANS); State Sewerage Department (JPP Sabah)	Electricity and utilities; Infrastructure
Ministry of Youth, Sports Development and Creative Economy	State statutory bodies: Sabah State Sports Board (LSNS); Sabah State Sports Council (MSN Sabah); State-owned companies: Koperasi Serbaguna SANYA Bhd. (KOSAN)	Youth and sports affairs; Creative economy (K-economy)

== Head of government ==
The Chief Minister of Sabah (Malay: Ketua Menteri Sabah) is the indirectly elected head of government of Sabah. He is officially appointed by the Yang di-Pertua Negeri (Governor), who in His Excellency's judgement is likely to command the confidence of the majority of the members of State Legislative Assembly. He heads the State Cabinet, whose members are appointed by the Yang di-Pertua Negara on the advice of the Chief Minister. The Chief Minister and his Cabinet shall be collectively responsible to State Legislative Assembly. The Chief Minister's Department is the body and ministry in which the Chief Minister exercises its functions and powers.
