= List of tallest buildings in Johor Bahru =

This list of tallest buildings in Johor Bahru involves skyscrapers within the city of Johor Bahru, the capital of the state of Johor, Malaysia. The city is situated along the Straits of Johor at the southern end of Peninsular Malaysia. It has a population of 858,118 as of 2020, and forms the core city of Johor Bahru District, which is the second largest district in Malaysia by population. The tallest building in the city is The Astaka, which is currently Malaysia's tallest skyscraper outside of Kuala Lumpur, as well as one of the tallest in Asia and the 10th tallest twin towers in the world.

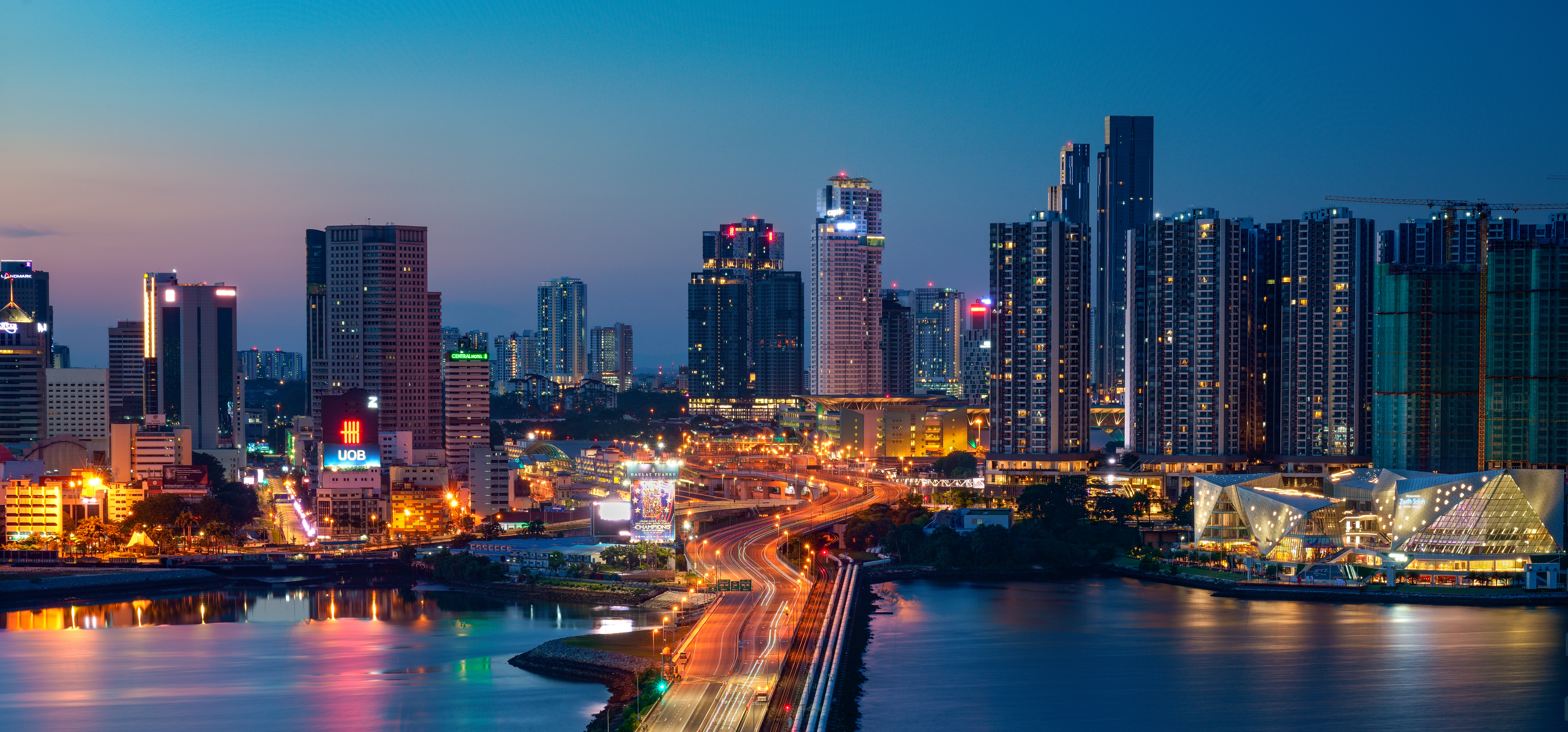
Johor Bahru skyline at night

== Overview ==
In recent years, many high-rise developments have sprung up all across Johor Bahru, due in part to the influx of foreign investors. As of 2021, it is estimated that there are over 572 completed high-rises and skyscrapers in the city.

Currently, the tallest skyscraper in this waterfront city is The Astaka Tower A, built in 2018. It stands at 278.8 meters tall (height to architectural top), which also makes it the current tallest residential building in Southeast Asia. Tower B of the same condominium complex is the second tallest building in Johor Bahru.

== List of tallest buildings ==
This lists ranks skyscrapers in Johor Bahru that stand at least 140 m (459 ft) tall, based on standard height measurement. This includes spires and architectural details but does not include antenna masts. This list includes buildings that are completed.

bold	Denotes building that is or was once the tallest in Johor Bahru

Rank	Building	Height (m)	Floors	Location	Built	Notes
1	The Astaka Tower A	278.8	72	One Bukit Senyum	2018	Tallest building in Malaysia outside of Kuala Lumpur.
2	The Astaka Tower B	255.6	67	One Bukit Senyum	2018	
3	LINBAQ Space Residency	250	60	Taman Abad	2024	
4	Altus (Setia Sky 88)	219	60	Wadi Hana	2017	
5	Bay Laurel Tower 1	214	55	Danga Bay	2017	
5	Royal Strand Tower 3	214	55	Danga Bay	2017	
5	Sora (Setia Sky 88)	214	55	Wadi Hana	2017	
5	Nube (Setia Sky 88)	214	55	Wadi Hana	2017	
9	Tri Tower Residences I	211	54	Bukit Chagar	2019	
9	Tri Tower Residences II	211	54	Bukit Chagar	2019	
11	Bay Laurel Tower 2	203	51	Danga Bay	2017	
12	Kings Bay Tower 1	199	50	Danga Bay	2017	
13	The Lovell	195	49	Danga Bay	2017	
14	Amberside Tower 2	187	47	Danga Bay	2017	
14	Royal Strand Tower 2	187	47	Danga Bay	2017	
14	Green Haven Service Apartment A	187	47	Permas Jaya	2018	
17	Amberside Tower 3	183	46	Danga Bay	2017	
17	Royal Strand Tower 1	183	46	Danga Bay	2017	
19	Green Heaven Service Apartment B	167	45	Permas Jaya	2018	
19	Tri Tower Capri By Fraser	160	45	Bukit Chagar	2019	
21	Kings Bay Tower 2	150	44	Danga Bay	2017	
22	Bay Point Tower 5	147	43	Danga Bay	2017	
22	Meridin Suites A	171	43	Medini City	2018	
24	Menara Jland	170	38	City Centre	2018	
25	Bora Residence	168	42	Danga Bay	2017	
25	Green Haven Service Apartment C	168	42	Permas Jaya	2018	
27	Teega 1	164	41	Puteri Harbour	2017	
27	Teega 2	164	41	Puteri Harbour	2017	
27	Teega 3	164	41	Puteri Harbour	2017	
27	Southern Marina Tower 1	164	41	Puteri Harbour	2019	
31	Landmark Tower	161	35	City Centre	1998	The first skyscraper in Johor.
32	Pavilion Residence A	160	40	Terbau	2018	
32	Pavilion Residence B	160	40	Terbau	2018	
34	Bay Point Tower 4	156	39	City Centre	2017	
34	Bay Point Tower 6	156	39	City Centre	2017	
34	Meridin@The Medini A	156	39	Medini City	2017	
37	Tropez Residences Tower A	152	38	Danga Bay	2015	
37	Tropez Residences Tower B	152	38	Danga Bay	2015	Topped out in 2014
37	Pinnacle Tower A	152	38	City Centre	2017	
37	Southern Marina Tower 2	152	38	Puteri Harbour	2019	
41	Molek Pine Apartment 4	148	37	City Centre	2015	
41	Imperia 1	148	37	Medini City	2015	
41	V@Summerplace	148	37	City Centre	2016	
41	Somerset	148	37	Medini City	2016	
41	D'Summit Residence A	148	37	Skudai	2017	
41	D'Summit Residence B	148	37	Skudai	2017	
41	D'Summit Residence C	148	37	Skudai	2017	
41	Meridin@The Medini B	148	37	Medini City	2017	
41	Marina View Apartment A	148	37	Permas Jaya	2018	
50	Pinnacle Tower B	144	36	City Centre	2017	
51
51	JB City Square - Office Tower	140	35	City Centre	1999	
51	KSL City Residential A	140	35	City Centre	2014	
51	KSL City Residential B	140	35	City Centre	2014	
51	M Condoninium A	140	35	Larkin	2017	
51	M Condominium C	140	35	Larkin	2017	
51	Princess Cove 1	140	35	Princess Cove	2019	
51	Princess Cove 3	140	35	Princess Cove	2019	

== Buildings planned or under construction ==
This is a list of buildings over 100m that have been planned or are currently under construction within Johor Bahru.

Name	Height (m)	Floors	Location	Status
Lido Sky 118	551	118	Lido Waterfront	Planned
The Crest (Signature Office Tower)	370	78	IIBD	Planned
R&F Tower 1	307	79	Tanjung Puteri	Planned
Arden @ One Bukit Senyum	260	68	Bukit Senyum	Under Construction
Space Residency I by Linbaq	~250	60	Taman Abad	Architecturally Topped Out
Space Residency II by Linbaq	~250	60	Taman Abad	Architecturally Topped Out
Sunway Mixed-Used Development 1	~230		Bukit Chagar	Under Construction
Sunway Mixed-Used Development 2	~230		Bukit Chagar	Under Construction
Sunway Mixed-Used Development 3	~230		Bukit Chagar	Under Construction
Sunway Mixed-Used Development 4	~230		Bukit Chagar	Under Construction
The Avalon (Service Apartment)	~200		IIBD	Under Construction
Quayside JBCC	~180		IIBD	Under Construction
The Vault (Bank Rakyat HQ)	~170		IIBD	Architecturally Topped Out
Sorvereign Garden (Coronade Residences)	~170		IIBD	Under Construction
The Elixir (KPJ Medical Suites)	~170		IIBD	Structurally Topped Out
Novotel II by Linbaq	~160		Taman Abad	Architecturally Topped Out
The Realm (Hotel)	~150		IIBD	Planned

== Gallery ==
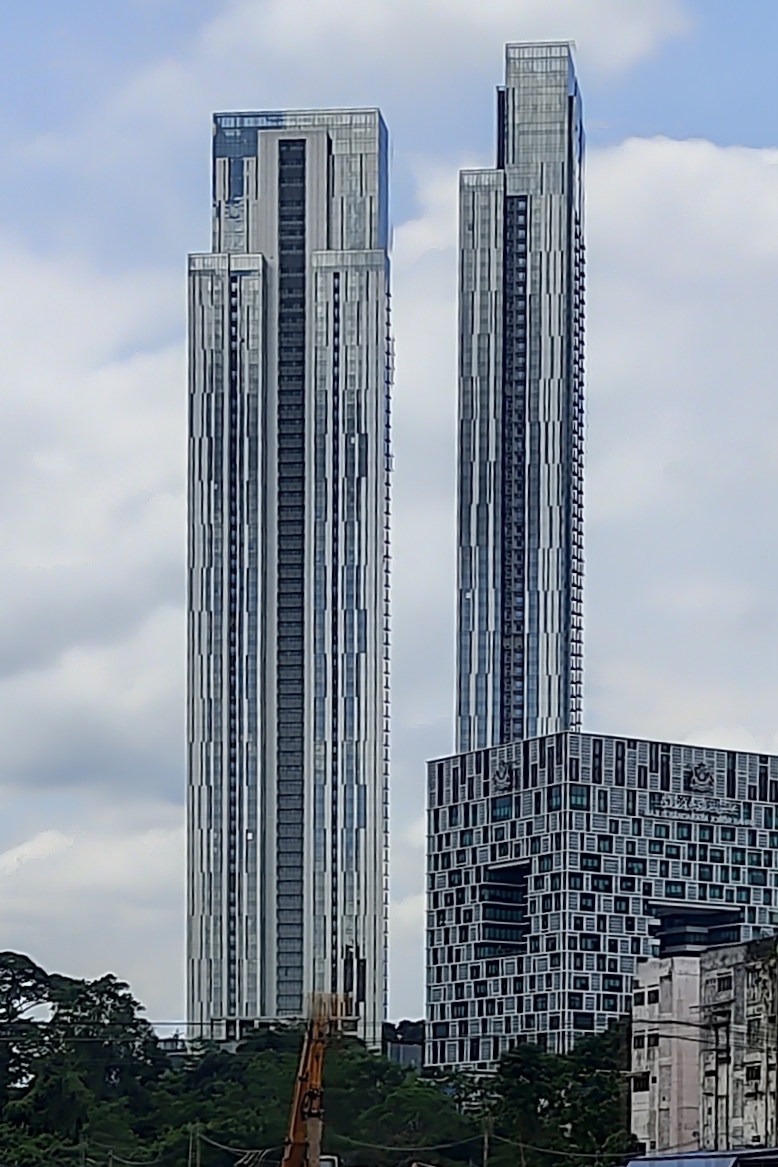
The Astaka Tower A is the tallest skyscraper in Johor Bahru and the tallest residential building in Southeast Asia.

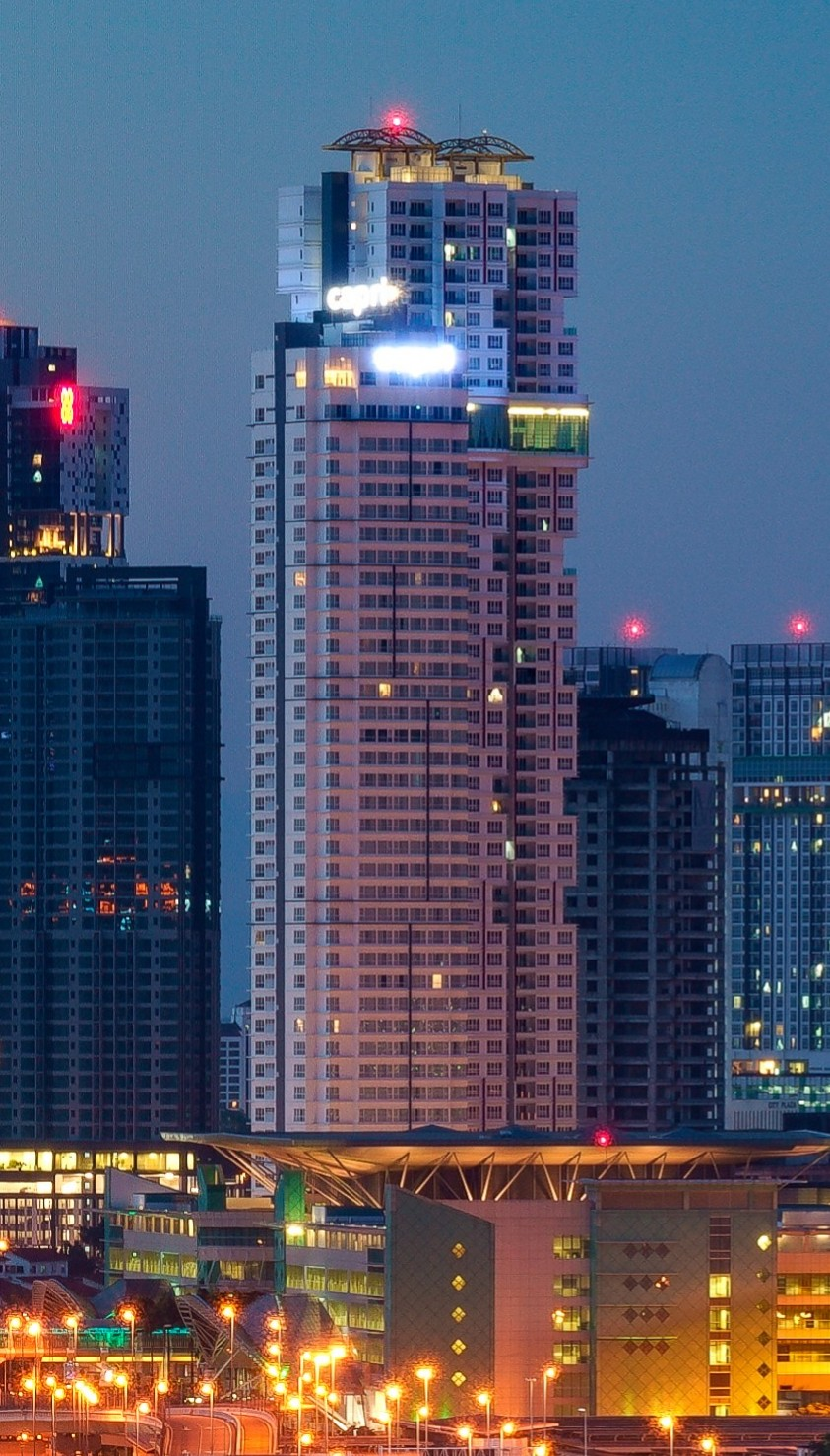
TriTower Residence includes two of the ten skyscrapers that are above 200 metres high.

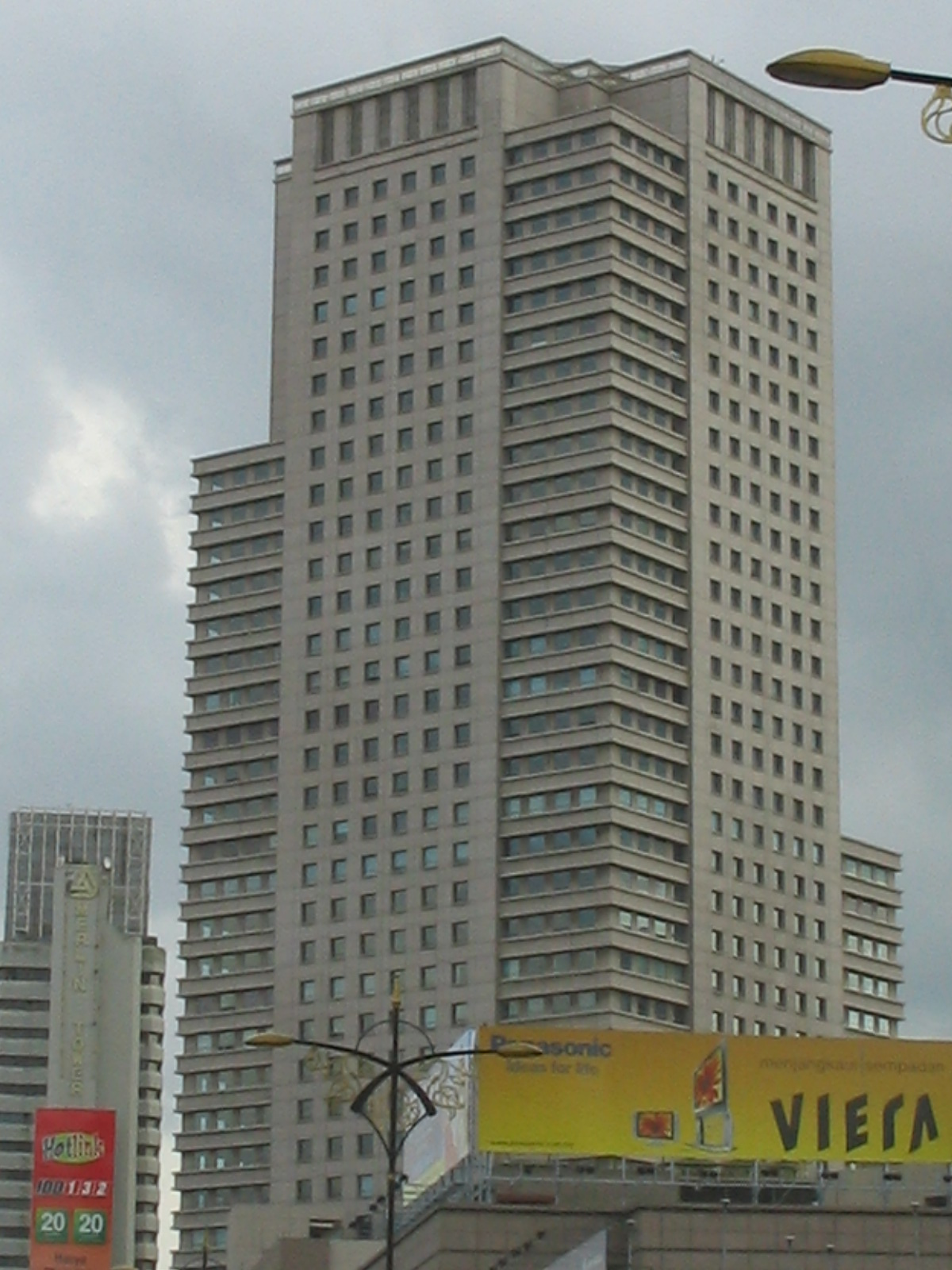
Johor Bahru City Square was previously the tallest building in Johor Bahru for 19 years, before the recent development boom.

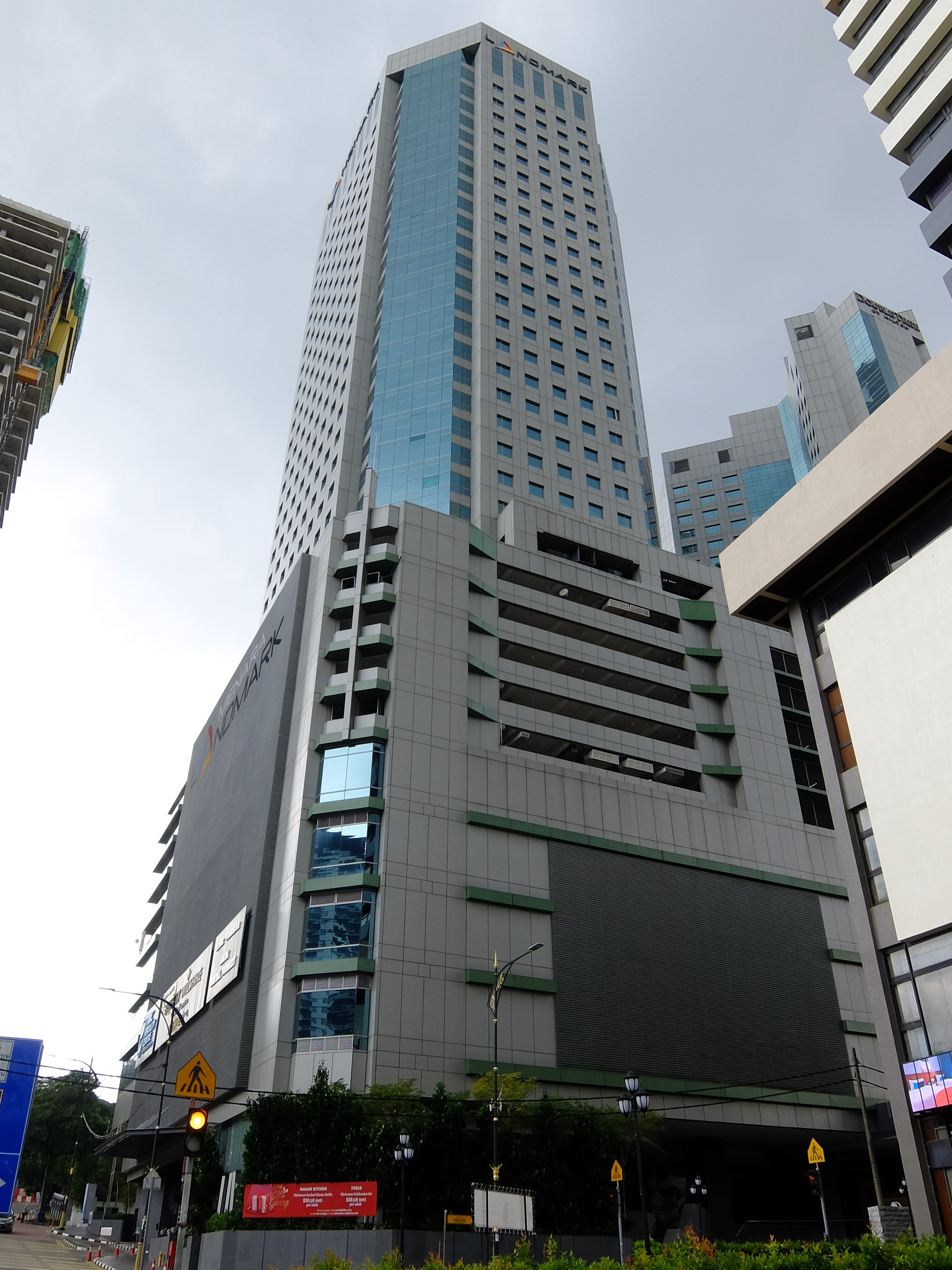
Menara Landmark Office Tower once shared the title with Johor Bahru City Square and was the first skyscraper in Johor Bahru.

== See also ==
- List of tallest buildings in the world
- List of tallest buildings in Malaysia
- List of tallest buildings in Kuala Lumpur
- List of tallest buildings in George Town
- List of tallest buildings in Kota Kinabalu
