= Sabah State Legislative Assembly Building =

Legislative building in Kota Kinabalu, Sabah, Malaysia

- Bangunan Dewan Undangan Negeri Sabah
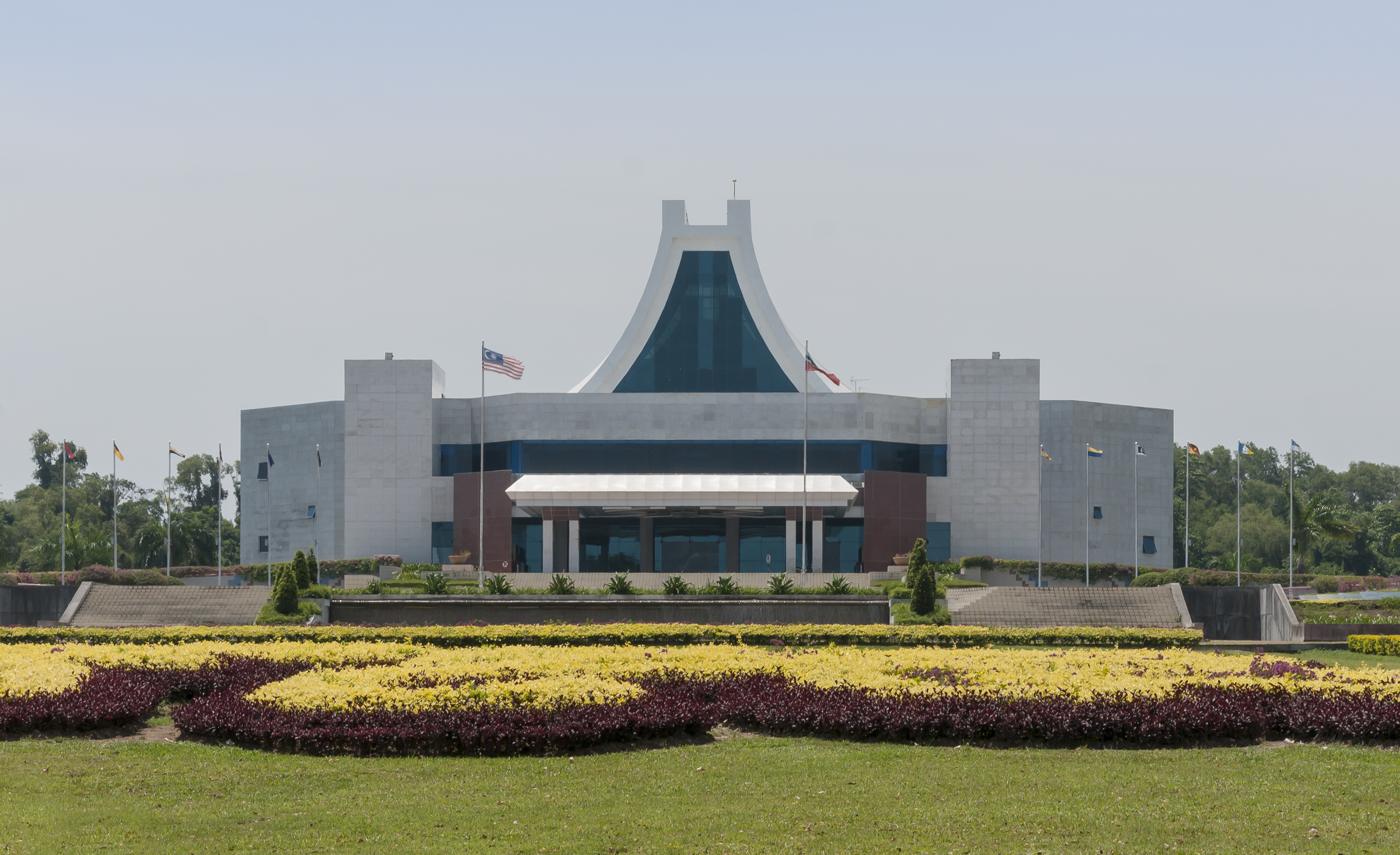
- Exterior of the assembly building pictured in 2012
- Interactive map of the Sabah State Legislative Assembly Building area

General information
- Status: Completed
- Type: State legislative assembly
- Location: Kota Kinabalu, Sabah, Malaysia
- Coordinates: 6°1′31″N 116°6′41″E
- Opening: June 1995
- Cost: RM150 million
- Owner: Sabah state government

Technical details
- Floor count: 4

Sabah State Legislative Assembly building (Malay: Bangunan Dewan Undangan Negeri Sabah) is the current state legislative complex for the state of Sabah, Malaysia. This is the venue where all the elected state assemblymen from Sabah would convene a meeting in order to debate state government policies and pass laws.

== History ==
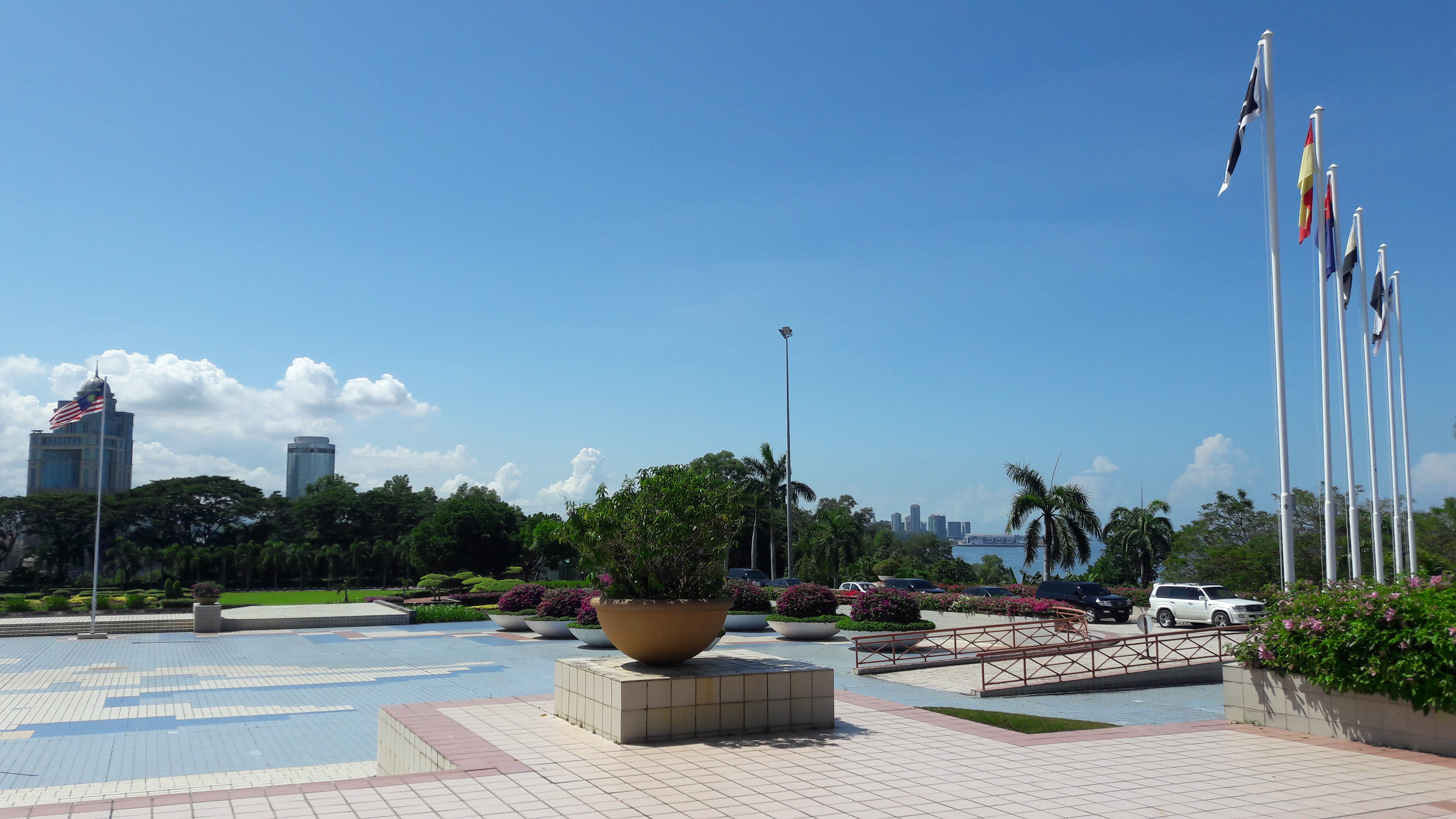
View towards south from the main entrance.

The building was opened in June 1995. It is located 8 km from Kota Kinabalu city centre on a hilltop overlooking Tanjung Lipat, an area where major state and federal government offices and institutions are concentrated.

Previously, the Sabah State Legislative Assembly operated from two temporary locations: the present building of Sabah Museum from 1967 to 1980 and the Tun Mustapha Tower eighth floor from 1980 until 1995.

== Structure ==
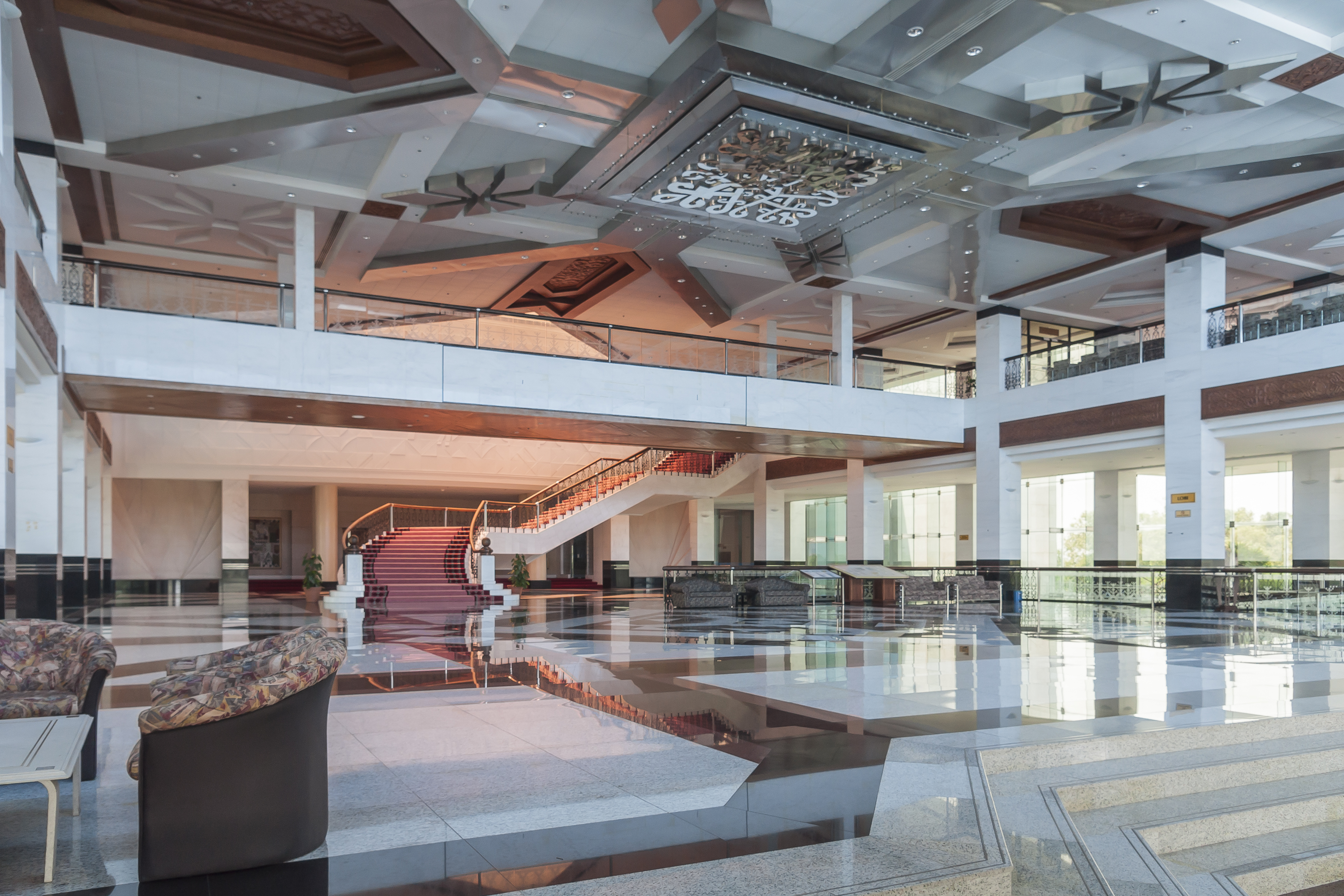
Main entrance lobby

The building footprint itself occupies 2 hectares within a land area of 11 hectares. It has four storeys, and the administration office is located on the 4th floor.

== Floor directory ==
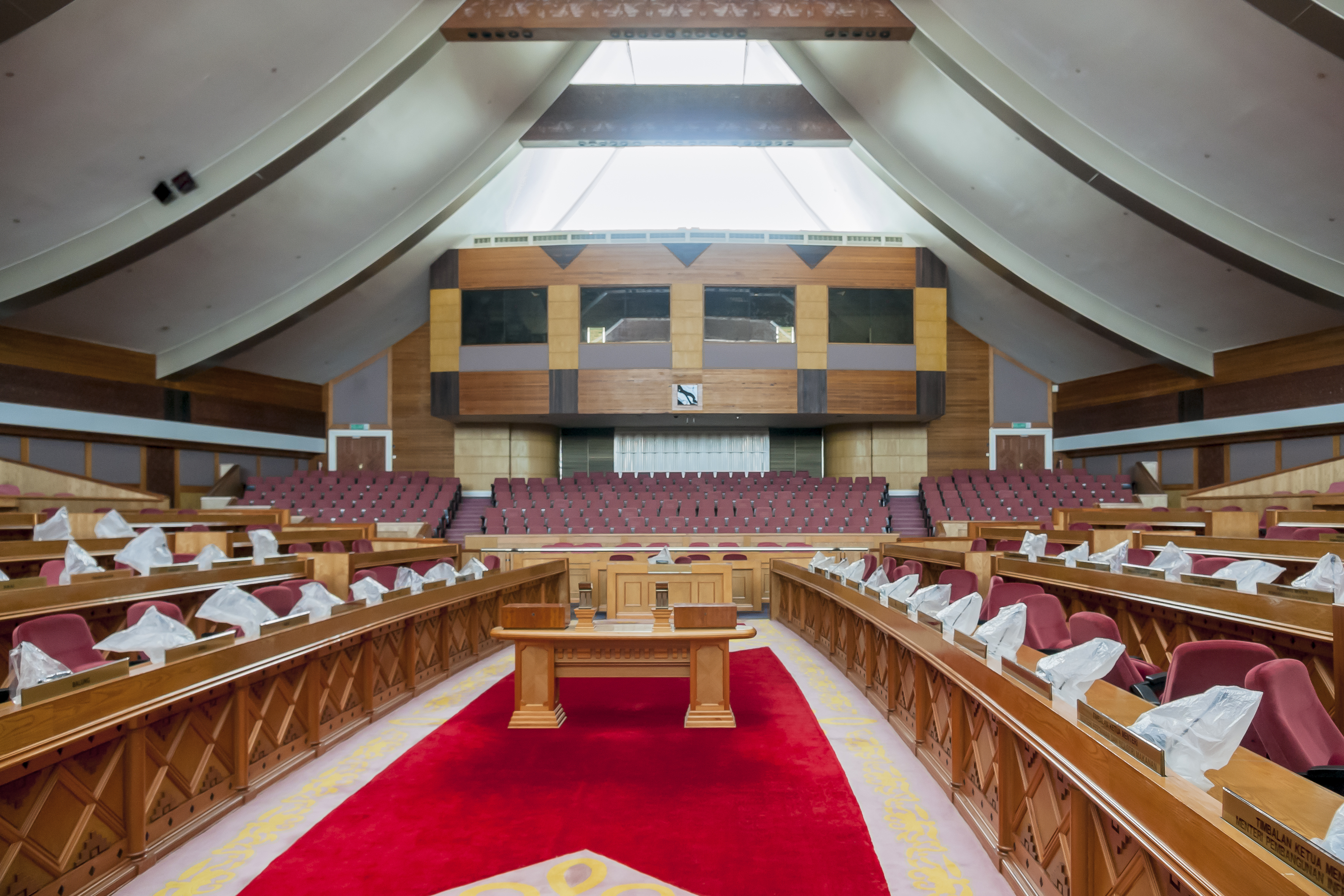
Assembly Chamber

The state assembly building is equipped with the following facilities in each floor:

| 1st Floor | Vehicle parking spaces |
| 2nd Floor | Banquet hall |
| 3rd Floor | Media room; Gymnasium; Muslim prayer room (Surau) |
| 4th Floor | Assembly Chamber; Offices of the Speaker and Deputy Speakers; Administration Office; Committee Room; Offices of the State Cabinet Ministers; Resting lounges for State Assemblymen; Library |

== See also ==
- Sabah State Legislative Assembly
- Wisma Innoprise
- Tun Mustapha Tower
