= Jesselton Residences =

Condominium and shopping mall in Kota Kinabalu, Sabah, Malaysia

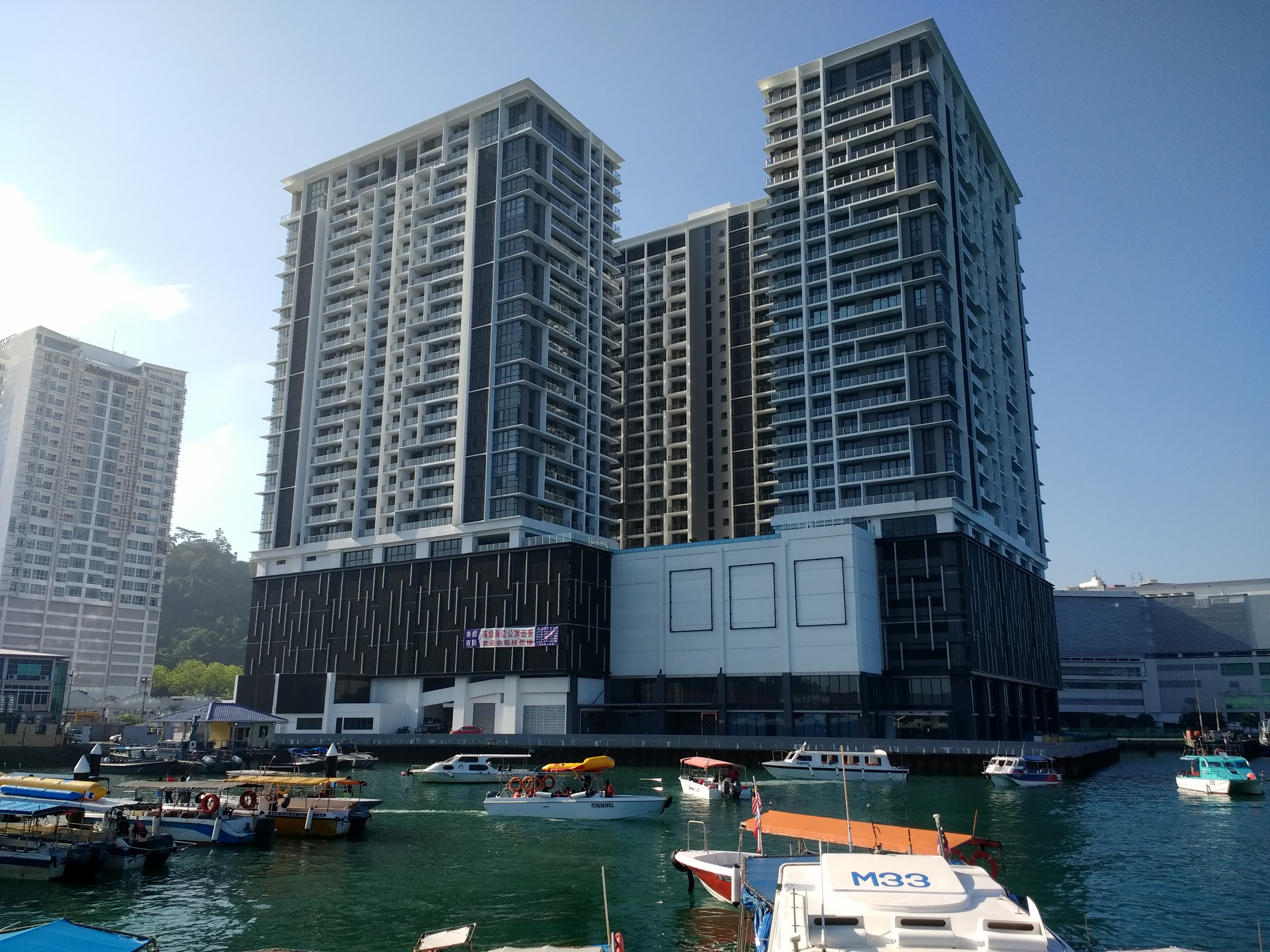
- Interactive map of the Jesselton Residences area

General information
- Status: Completed
- Location: Sabah, Kota Kinabalu, Malaysia
- Coordinates: 5°59′20″N 116°4′41″E
- Cost: MYR700 million
- Owner: Palikota Sdn Bhd (subsidiary of Jesselton Waterfront Holdings); Vinci Grand Projects Sdn Bhd

Other information
- Facilities: 28-storey towers

Website
- www.jesseltonresidences.com

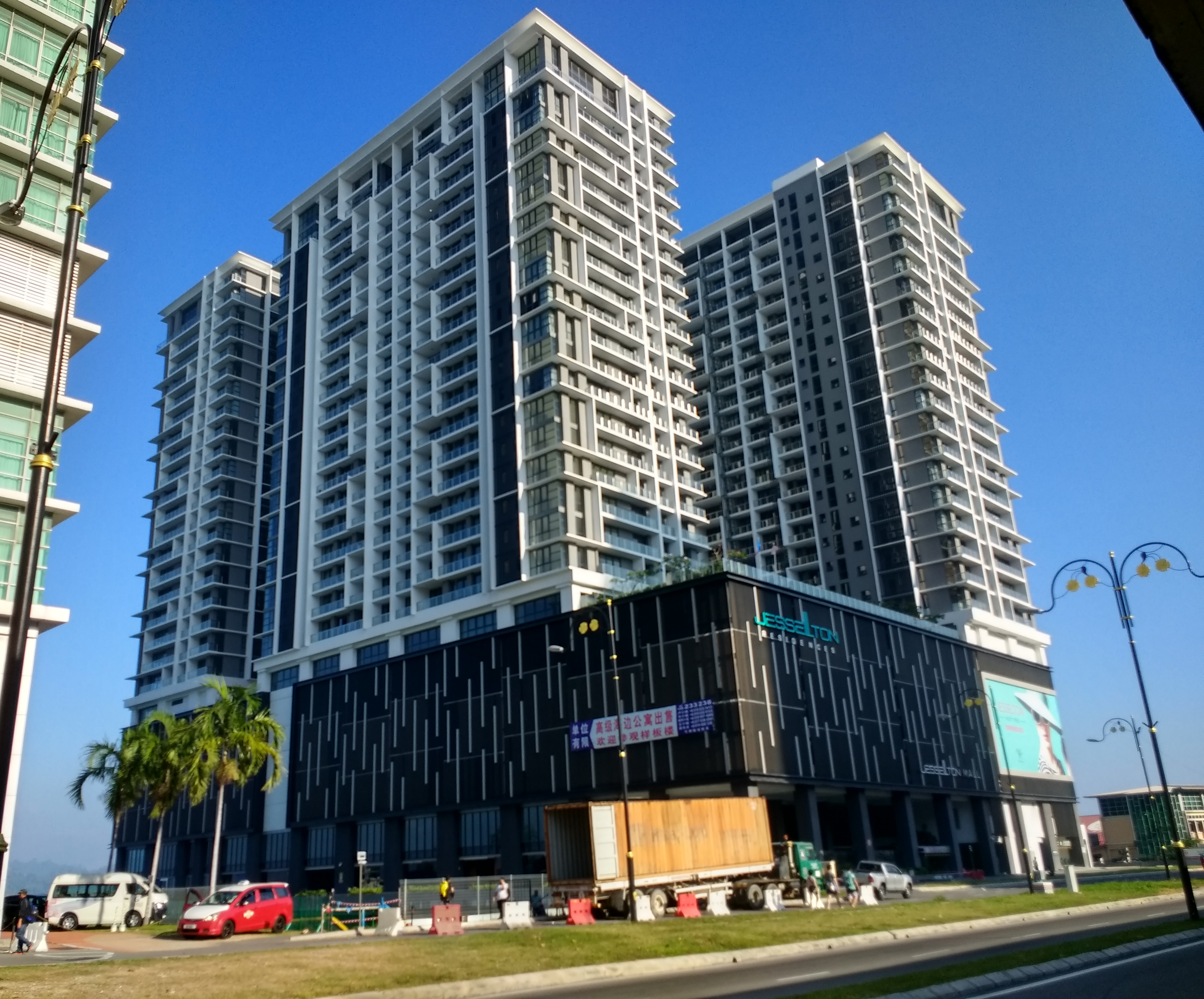
Jesselton Residences

The Jesselton Residences is a 28-storey triplet tower comprising shopping malls and condominium. The shopping mall is known as Jesselton Mall which was also the first and only upscale duty free mall in Borneo.

== History ==
Originally developed by Palikota Sdn Bhd, a subsidiary of Jesselton Waterfront Holdings, the building construction project awarded to a French firm Vinci Grand Projects Sdn Bhd in 2014 to complete it.

In early 2017, the building received the certificate of occupancy and will start to open for retail leasing following the building completion.

== See also ==
- List of tallest buildings in Kota Kinabalu
- Jesselton Twin Towers
