= Chief Minister's Department of Sabah =

- Jabatan Ketua Menteri Sabah

Agency overview
- Type: State ministry
- Jurisdiction: Government of Sabah
- Headquarters: Sabah State Administrative Complex, Block A, Floor 6&7, Jalan Teluk Likas, Tanjung Lipat, 88400, Kota Kinabalu, Sabah
- Annual budget: RM634.42 million (2023)
- Minister responsible: Hajiji Noor, Chief Minister
- Assistant minister responsible: Abidin Madingkir, Assistant Minister to the Chief Minister; Nizam Abu Bakar Titingan, Assistant Minister
- Website: https://jkm.sabah.gov.my

The Chief Minister's Department of Sabah (Malay: Jabatan Ketua Menteri Sabah) is a state government ministry of Sabah. It is responsible for the administration of the Chief Minister and other matters related to the state government. The ministry is modelled after the federal Prime Minister's Department.

== Ministry executives ==
The Department is administered by:

- Datuk Seri Panglima Hajiji Noor, the Chief Minister.
  - Datuk Abdul Kassim Razali, Chief Political Secretary to the Chief Minister
  - Ceasar Mandela Malakun, Chief Political Secretary to the Chief Minister
    - Dato' Redonah Bahanda, Political Secretary to the Chief Minister
    - Roland Chia Ming Shen, Political Secretary to the Chief Minister
  - Effendi Mohd Sunoh, Public Relation Secretary to the Chief Minister
  - Alrick Jilan, Private Secretary to the Chief Minister
  - Datuk Abidin Madingkir, the Assistant Minister to the Chief Minister
  - Datuk Nizam Abu Bakar Titingan, the Assistant Minister

== Agencies under the Department ==
Among the agencies that fall under jurisdiction of this portfolio including:

- Istana Seri Kinabalu (the State Palace)
- Chief Minister's Office
- Office of the State Secretary
- Office of the Deputy State Secretary (Administration)
- Office of the Deputy State Secretary (Development)
- Cabinet and Policy Division (BKD)
- Community Development Leaders' Unit (UPPM)
- Government Printing Department (JCK)
- Internal Affairs and Research Office (PHEDNP)
- Management and Finance Division (BPK)
- Natural Resources Office (PHB)
- Press and Publications Office (PAP)
- Protocol and Ceremony Division (BIP)
- Sabah State Integrity Unit
- Sabah State Liaison Office, Kuala Lumpur (PPNSKL)
- State Legislative Assembly
- State Public Service Commission (SPANS)
- State Attorney-General's Chambers (SAGC)
- Kota Kinabalu City Hall (DBKK)
- Sabah Forestry Department
- Sabah Lands and Surveys Department (JTU)
- Sabah State Archives Department
- Sabah State Public Service Department (JPAN)
- State Economic Planning Unit (UPEN)

State statutory bodies:

- Sabah Biodiversity Centre (SaBC)
- Sabah Economic Development and Investment Authority (SEDIA)
- Sabah Forest Development Authority (SAFODA)
- Sabah Foundation (YS)
- Sabah Land Development Board (SLDB)
- Tun Fuad Foundation (YTF)

State-owned companies:

- Institute for Development Studies (IDS)
- MLGH (Sabah) Sdn. Bhd.
- Sabah Energy Corporation Sdn. Bhd.
- Sabah Forest Industries Sdn. Bhd. (SFI)
- Sawit Kinabalu Bhd.
