= The Astaka =

Skyscraper complex in Johor Bahru, Johor, Malaysia

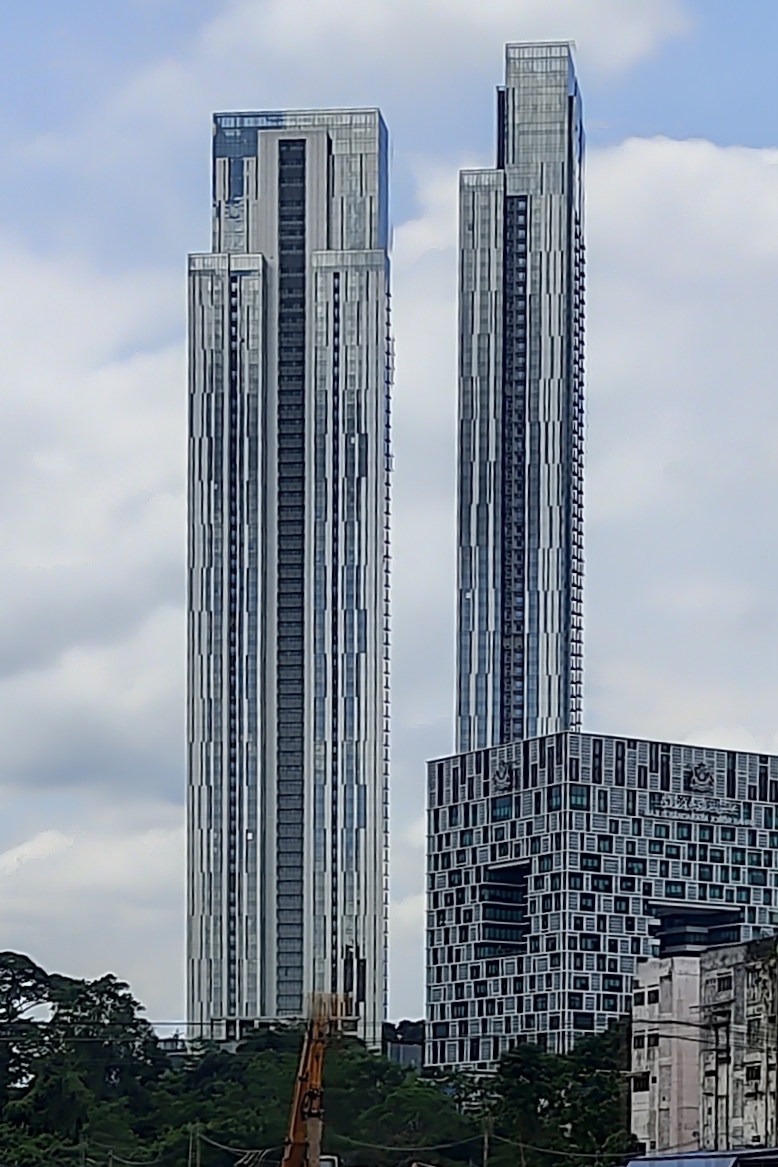
- The Astaka in July 2022, standing behind the City Council new headquarters (bottom right)
- Interactive map of the The Astaka area

Record height
- Tallest in the southern region of Peninsular Malaysia since 2018^{[I]}
- Preceded by: Silverscape Residences @ Hatten City Melaka

General information
- Type: Residential
- Location: Astaka Boulevard, One Bukit Senyum, 80300, Johor Bahru, Malaysia
- Coordinates: 1°28′26″N 103°45′55″E
- Construction started: 2014
- Completed: 2017
- Opening: 2018
- Owner: Astaka Padu Sdn Bhd

Height
- Architectural: Tower A: 278.9 m (915 ft); Tower B: 255.6 m (839 ft)
- Top floor: Tower A: 276.7 m (908 ft); Tower B: 253.4 m (831 ft)

Technical details
- Floor count: Tower A: 72; Tower B: 67
- Floor area: 68,462 m^{2} (736,920 ft^{2})
- Lifts/elevators: 5
- Grounds: 133,355 m^{2} (1,435,420 ft^{2})

Design and construction
- Architect: GDP Architects
- Structural engineer: SMA Bersekutu Sdn Bhd
- Known for: Tallest buildings in Johor Bahru and Johor, Tallest buildings outside of Kuala Lumpur

The Astaka is a twin-tower residential complex in Johor Bahru, Malaysia. Tower A, with a height of 278.9 m (915 ft), is currently the tallest skyscraper in Johor Bahru and the tallest building in Malaysia outside of Kuala Lumpur. It is also the tallest residential skyscraper in Southeast Asia.

Tower B is the second tallest skyscraper in Johor Bahru, at 255.6 m (839 ft). The complex houses 438 apartments, including penthouse duplexes. The penthouses in both towers are exclusively owned by the Sultan of Johor.

Open in 2018, The Astaka is one of the few development projects in Johor Bahru that has private lifts and is within walking distance of the CIQ Complex.
