= Kota Kinabalu City Waterfront =

Building in Kota Kinabalu, Sabah, Malaysia

General information
- Status: Unknown Status
- Location: Sabah, Kota Kinabalu, Malaysia
- Owner: Sunsea Development Sdn Bhd

Website
- kkcwaterfront.com.my

The Kota Kinabalu City Waterfront is a mixed development projects comprising a shopping mall (Oceanus Waterfront Mall), hotel, city-resort home and boardwalk in Kota Kinabalu, Sabah, Malaysia. It is a waterfront revitalisation projects under the Sabah Development Corridor (SDC) as part of the efforts to transform Kota Kinabalu into a metropolitan city. Other part of the waterfront is the Jesselton Quay, Kota Kinabalu Convention City and One Jesselton Waterfront, which developed by different developers.
