= Kota Kinabalu Convention City =

Building in Kota Kinabalu, Sabah, Malaysia

- Interactive map of the Kota Kinabalu Convention City area

General information
- Status: Terminated
- Location: Sabah, Kota Kinabalu, Malaysia
- Coordinates: 5°59′41″N 116°4′58″E
- Cost: RM1.4 million
- Owner: Mah Sing Group

Website
- www.kkcc.my

The Kota Kinabalu Convention City is a mixed development project comprising residential, commercial, tourism centre and waterfront in Kota Kinabalu, Sabah, Malaysia. It is part of waterfront revitalisation projects under the Sabah Development Corridor (SDC) to transform Kota Kinabalu into a metropolitan city. The building projects covering an area of a 9.33-acre site will be developed by Mah Sing Group. Other part of the waterfront is the Jesselton Quay, Kota Kinabalu City Waterfront and One Jesselton Waterfront, which developed by different developers.
