= James Westwater Ferrie =

Singaporean architect (1917–1993)

James Westwater Ferrie (19 May 1917 – 3 February 1993) was a prominent architect in Singapore.

== Early life and education ==
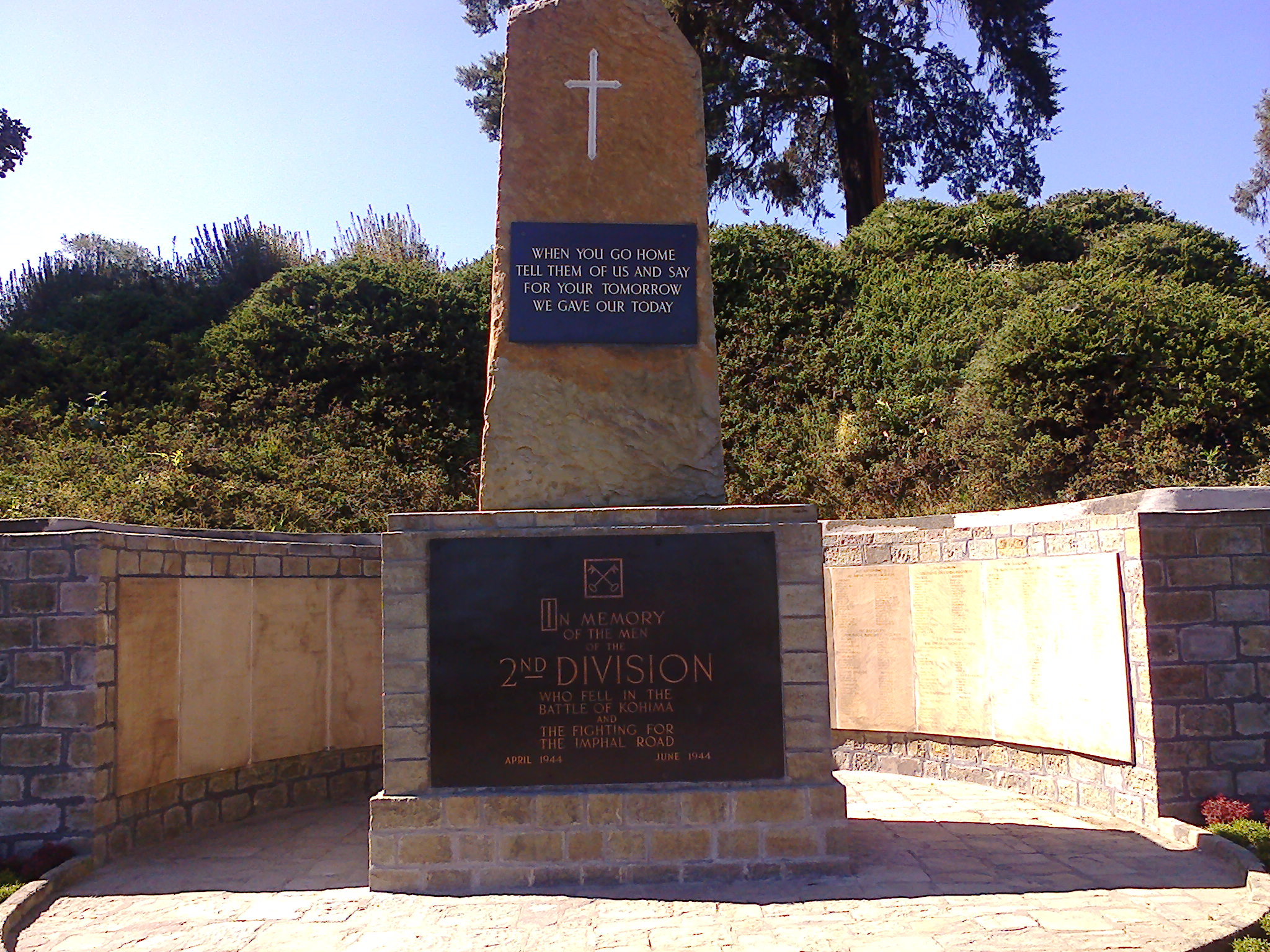
The memorial in Kohima

Ferrie was born in Glasgow, Scotland on 19 May 1917 to brass moulder James Ferrie and his wife Isabella Westwater. He studied at the Mackintosh School of Architecture of the Glasgow School of Art. He served in the Burma campaign of World War II as a Lieutenant in the Royal Engineers, 2nd Division. He was involved in the Battle of Kohima. He designed the Kohima Epitaph, a memorial built in memory of those from his division who had died. After the war, he returned to the United Kingdom.

== Career ==
Ferrie came to Singapore in 1948 and was employed at Palmer & Turner Architects, a prominent architectural firm, as part of a three-year contract. However, after his contract had ended, he chose to remain in Singapore. He established his own architecture firm, James Ferrie & Partners. From 1966 to 1968, he served as the president of the Institute of Architects of Malaya. He retired as an architect in the late 1980s.

Ferrie was also a watercolour painter. Although it was mainly a hobby of his, some of his paintings were put on display in 1978 at the Gallery of Fine Arts owned by arts patron Della Butcher, housed in the Orchard Towers. In 1986, 58 of his watercolour paintings were put on a display at a 10-day show at the Lone Pine Gallery. He particularly enjoyed painting seascapes. In August 1991, he held a fourth exhibition, mainly displaying paintings done from the lawn of his seaside home in Sembawang, as well as paintings depicting shophouses in Chinatown and scenes from his trips to seaside resorts in West Malaysia.

== Personal life and death ==
Ferrie was married to Isabel Ferrie, a puppeteer. He died in Chichester, England on 3 February 1993.
