= 1Borneo Hypermall =

Shopping mall in Kota Kinabalu, Sabah, Malaysia

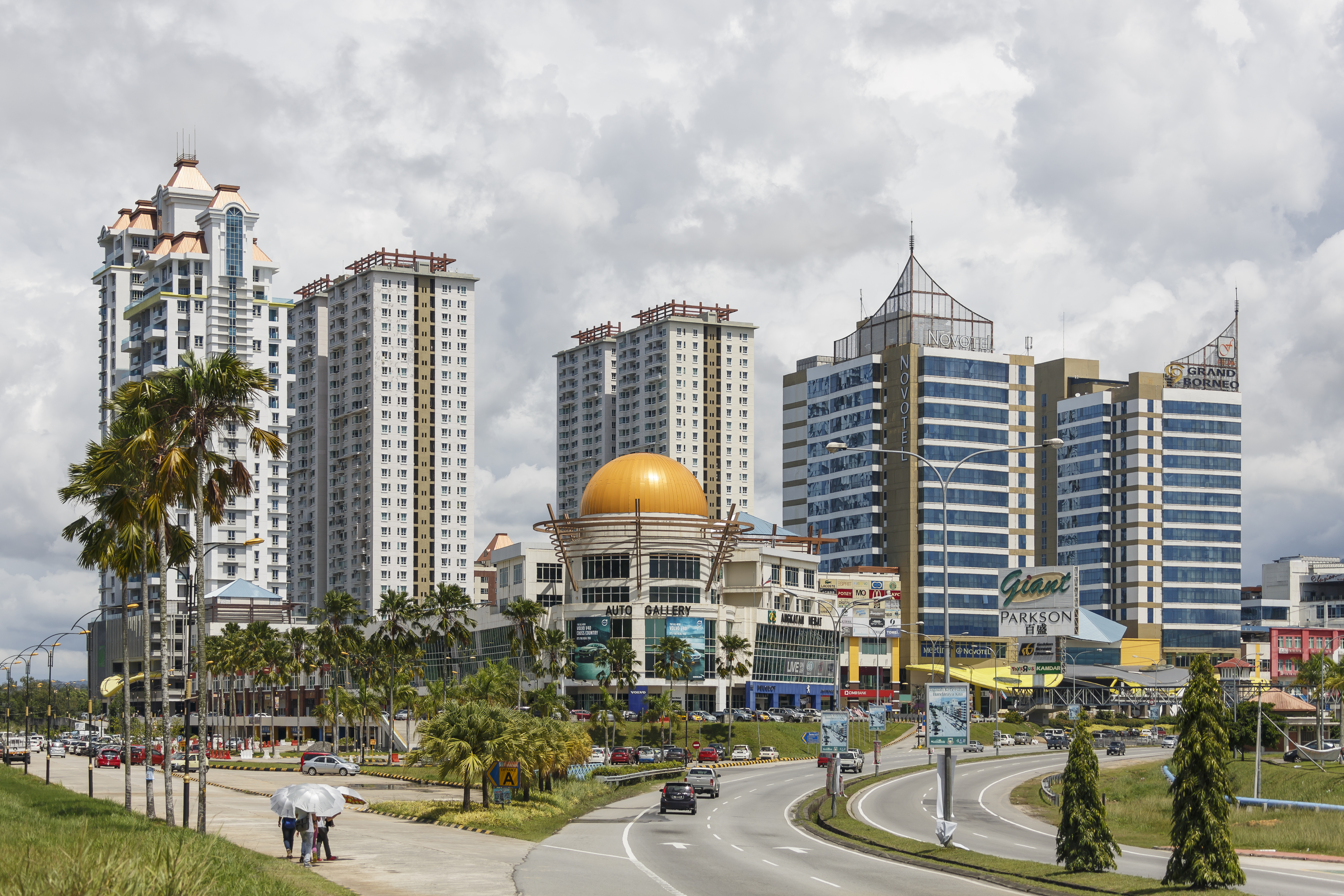
- Location: Kota Kinabalu, Sabah, Malaysia
- Coordinates: 6°02′09.6″N 116°07′47.0″E
- Address: Jalan Sulaman, 88400 Kota Kinabalu, Sabah, Malaysia.
- Opened: 31 May 2008; 18 years ago
- Developer: Sagajuta (Sabah) Sdn Bhd
- Manager: United 1Borneo Hypermall Sdn Bhd
- Owner: United 1Borneo Hypermall Sdn Bhd
- Floor area: 1,200,000 square feet (110,000 m^{2})
- Floors: 4
- Website: 1borneohypermall.com

1Borneo Hypermall is a 23.3 acres (9.4 ha) wide shopping centre located along Jalan Sulaman Highway in Kota Kinabalu, Sabah, Malaysia. It was developed by Sagajuta (Sabah) Sdn Bhd and now managed by United 1Borneo Hypermall Sdn Bhd. It is currently the largest shopping mall in East Malaysia.

== History ==
In c. 2007, Sagajuta (Sabah) Sdn Bhd, a division of the Ramajuta Group, started development on 1Borneo Hypermall. Directed by Chan Boon Siew, the division saw 1Borneo have its opening on 31 May 2008.

On 1 January 2019, the mall's management was handed over to the 7-person management committee of United 1Borneo Hypermall Sdn Bhd, headed by Chairman Wong Da Wei (黄大卫).

== Location ==
1Borneo is located 7 km (4.3 mi) away from the city centre of Kota Kinabalu and about 13 km (8.1 mi) from the Kota Kinabalu International Airport. It is opposite the Alamesra Plaza and adjacent to the Universiti Malaysia Sabah.

== See also ==
- List of shopping malls in Malaysia
