= Jesselton Quay =

Building in Kota Kinabalu, Sabah, Malaysia

- Ground view of Jesselton Quay
- Interactive map of the Jesselton Quay area

General information
- Status: Completed
- Location: Sabah, Kota Kinabalu, Malaysia
- Coordinates: 5°59′30″N 116°4′50″E
- Cost: MYR1.8 billion
- Owner: SBC Group; Suria Group

Height
- Height: 129 m (423 ft)

Website
- www.jesseltonquay.com.my

The Jesselton Quay is a mixed development projects comprising a shopping and entertainment centre, hotel and offices in Kota Kinabalu, Sabah, Malaysia. It is known as the largest city projects in Sabah with a total cost of MYR1.8 billion modelled after the Singapore's Marina Bay Sands. Together with the Kota Kinabalu Convention City, Kota Kinabalu City Waterfront and One Jesselton Waterfront projects which is developed by different developers, it is part of waterfront revitalisation projects to transform Kota Kinabalu into a metropolitan city. The first phase of the project, Jesselton Quay Central which includes Citypads and Gallery Shoppes at 33-storey tall and a corner 8-storey office lot had been completed and delivered in 2021. Phase 2 comprising Q Suites and heritage streetmall is scheduled for completion in 2028.
