= Bay 21 =

Building in Kota Kinabalu, Sabah, Malaysia

- Interactive map of the Bay 21 area

General information
- Status: Completed
- Location: Sabah, Kota Kinabalu, Malaysia
- Coordinates: 5°59′33″N 116°5′33″E (Bay 21 Condominium); 5°59′32″N 116°5′34″E (Bay 21 TOO)
- Completed: 2016

Other information
- Facilities: 286 units

Bay 21 is a two condominium buildings comprising the Bay 21 Condominium and Bay Suites located near the Likas Bay in Kota Kinabalu. The first building which is Bay 21 condominium consists of 30-storey while Bay Suites consists of 35-storey which is also the 3rd tallest building in Borneo Island. Bay 21 is designed by architect Lo Su Yin.
