= 1Sulaman =

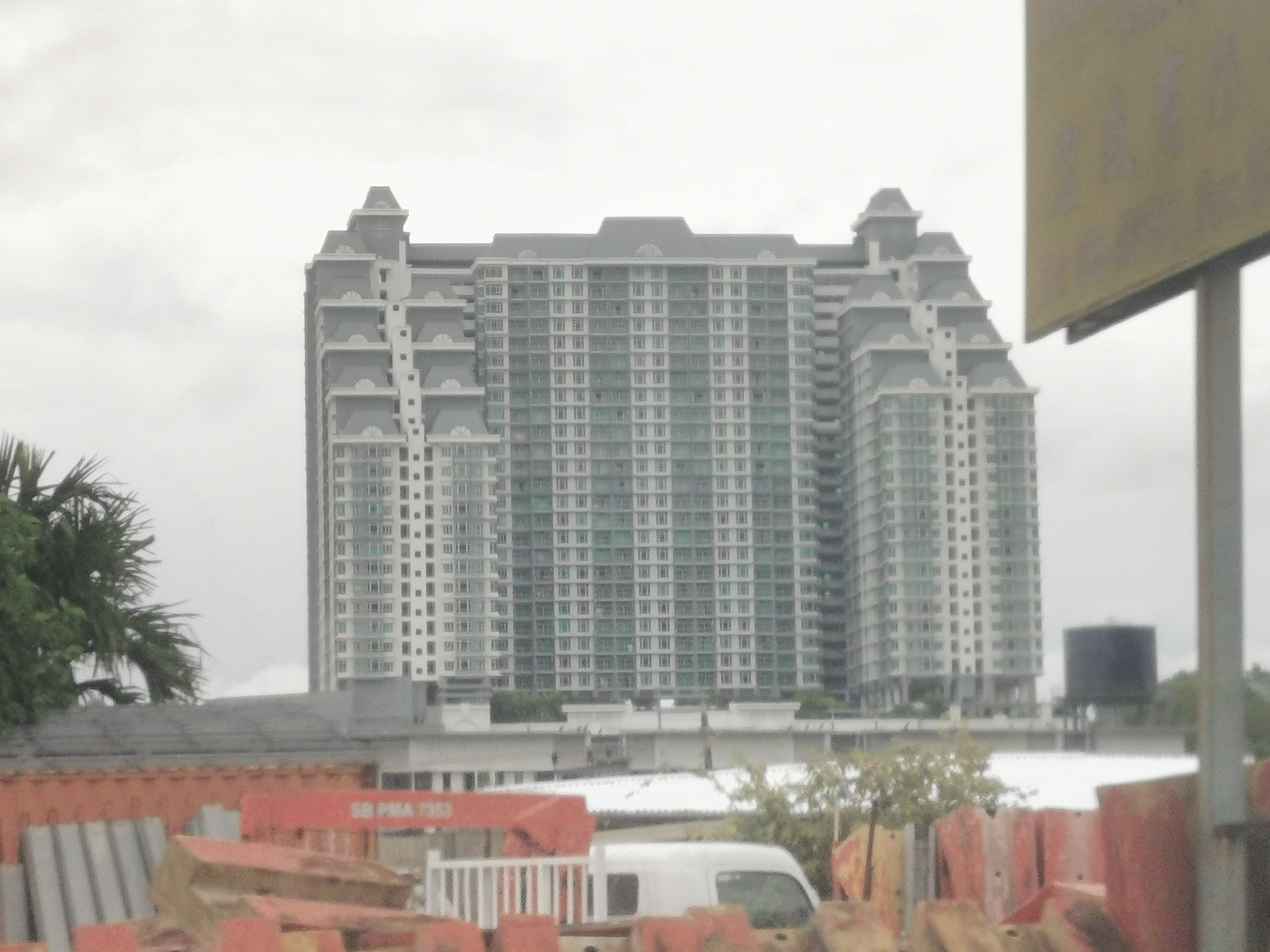
- Platinum Tower of 1Sulaman in 2025
- Interactive map of the 1Sulaman area

General information
- Status: complete (Wisma Sulaman & Platinum Tower)
- Location: Sabah, No. 1, Sulaman Road, 88400, Kota Kinabalu, Malaysia
- Coordinates: 6°2′47″N 116°8′52″E
- Construction started: 2009
- Construction stopped: 2016 (construction revived in March 2020)
- Topped-out: 2021 (Platinum Tower)
- Completed: 2022 (Platinum Tower)
- Cost: MYR160 million
- Owner: Sagajuta Sabah Sdn Bhd

Website
- platinumtower.my

1Sulaman is a mixed development project comprising a condominium, a water theme park, shoplots, a recreational landscape park and serviced suites. The project is divided into Parcel 1 (31-storey Platinum Tower), Parcel 2 (Wisma Sulaman), and Parcel 3 (35-storey Gold Tower).

== History ==
1Sulaman was originally developed by Sagajuta (Sabah) Sdn Bhd, and was predicted to be completed in 2015. However, due to several issues, the building remained unfinished until 2016, leading to the developer being sued by property lot buyers as well as from the Malaysian Inland Revenue Board. On 24 November 2016, the project was officially declared abandoned by the Ministry of Local Government.

Construction of the Platinum Tower was revived by the PH-Warisan government in March 2020. The tower was completed on 4 October 2022, except for the Gold Tower, which was still incomplete as of September 2024.

== Lawsuit ==
On 21 June 2016, the Malaysian Inland Revenue Board sued the developer over its failure to settle its tax arrears totalling over RM8.5 million. The Sabah state government also has since declared the project as abandoned and appointed a new developer to finish the project.

The project was subsequently undertaken by UHY Advisory (KL) Sdn Bhd on 15 January 2018 as stated in the website of Sabah Ministry of Local Government and Housing, although further rescue proposed a scheme by court, requesting the buyers to pay an additional RM130 per square foot to Excel Glamour Housing Sdn Bhd for the completion of the final 20% of the project.

The scheme has drawn objections since the firm was appointed without any open tender as well as the way the company seems to be profiting from the problem.
