= Sabah Foundation =

Malay state sanctioned organization

Sabah Foundation Yayasan Sabah
- Yayasan Sabah Group (YSG)

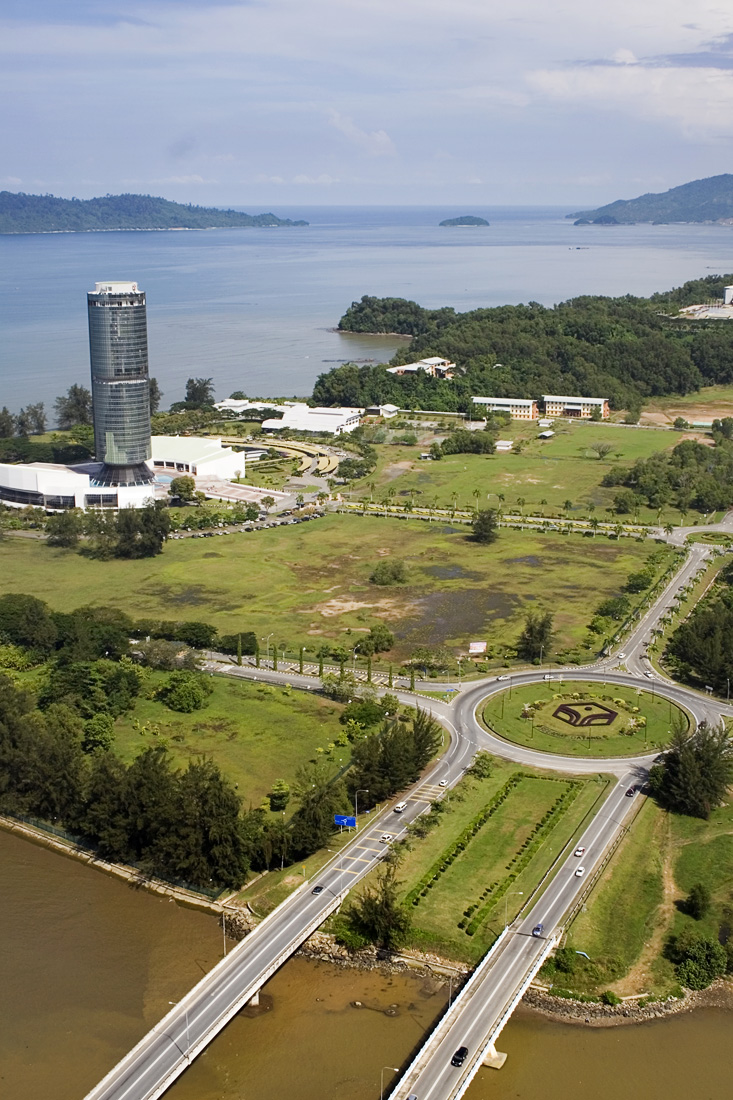
- Tun Mustapha Tower, Sabah Foundation headquarters in aerial view.

- Sabah in Malaysia
- Formation: 1966; 60 years ago
- Founder: Tun Mustapha Harun
- Type: Governmental organisation
- Purpose: Developmental, education, culture, and social advancement
- Location: Kota Kinabalu, Sabah, Malaysia
- Coordinates: 6°1′2″N 116°6′34″E
- Region served: Sabah
- Website: www.yayasansabahgroup.org.my

The Sabah Foundation (Malay: Yayasan Sabah) or Yayasan Sabah Group (YSG) is a state sanctioned organisation that was developed to promote educational and economic opportunities for its people. It was founded by Tun Mustapha Harun and manages a diverse portfolio of resources and issues. Ghulamhaidar Khan is the incumbent director of the foundation.

== History ==
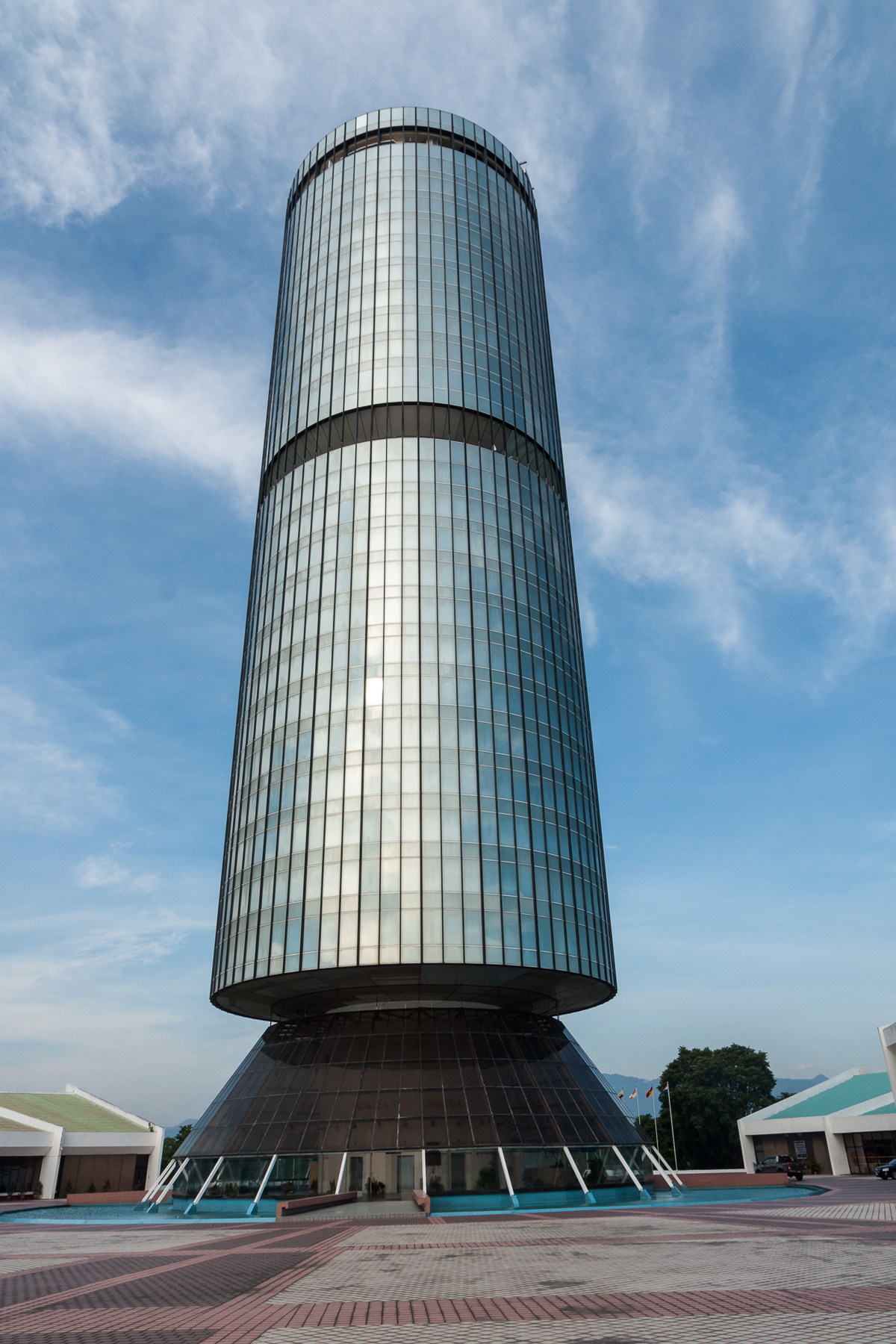
Tun Mustapha Tower, Sabah Foundation headquarters, which was opened in 1977

The Kota Kinabalu-based think-tank was allowed to be established by 1966 Sabah State Legislative Assembly Enactment No. 8. The foundation was created in 1966 by Tun Mustapha Harun to create educational opportunities for the country's Malaysian people. Four years later its scope was expanded to include economic and social advancement. It also coordinates distribution of resources in the event of a natural disaster to those in need. It was Tun Mustapa Harun's further goal "to promote Malayisation consciousness amongst the people of Sabah."

=== 1967–1975 ===
In 1967, coinciding with the formation of the Sabah Foundation, the Ministry of Natural Resources was abolished. The government gave the foundation 3,300 acres (1,300 ha) of land and a grant of 1 million ringgit to fund the start-up of the organisation. In 1970, Sabah Foundation was tasked, through a 100-year lease, of managing the 855,000 hectares of virgin forest. Nineteen years later their total holdings were 1.07 million hectares. Sabah's total land area is 7.4 million hectares. Tun Mustapha's withhelded earnings should have been paid to the state and used the fund for political purposes, providing proceeds to the electorate and to support his political associates.

Harold Crouch wrote of Tun Mustapha's resulting political power:

...only in Sabah during the rule of Tun Mustapha (from 1967 to 1975) were violations of democratic practices so flagrant that elections lost their meaning. When Sabah participated for the first time in a national election in 1969, opposition candidates managed to file nominations in only six of the sixteen constituencies, the rest being disqualified for one reason or another. In 1974 only one opposition candidate succeeded in being nominated. The leaders of an opposition party were said to have been bribed to abandon their challenge while supporters of another party, the peninsula-based Pekemas, were physically intimidated by Mustapha's men.

— Harold Crouch

In late 1975 Tun Mustapha was forced by the government to resign. The Sabah State government then pulled the foundation under the authority of the government. The foundation over-harvested its timber natural resources to fund its political agenda.

=== 1975−1985 ===
Although the foundation was no longer a private entity, the state government, led by the Berjaya political party, did not have the control that they expected because financial investments continued to be controlled by Innoprise, an entity and within the foundation responsible for managing its investments. The Sabah Foundation's large budget allows it to continued to manage a diverse range of activities, including reforestation, hospitality and tourism industry, agro-plantation, shipping, real estate development, biotechnology, horticulture, fisheries and food industry, and the oil and gas industry. It continued to wield political power, including state elections between 1978 and 1990.

=== 1986−present ===
After the Berjaya and until 1994, the Parti Bersatu Sabah (PBS) political party gained control of the government, "in opposition to the national government". In 1991 Jeffrey Kitingan, Sabah Foundation head, was detained under the Internal Security Act for 31 months for "plotting the secession of Sabah from the Malaysian Foundation" and then fired from his position at the foundation. Charges of corruption were dropped when Jeffrey Kitigan left the PBS political party.

In 1994, the United Malays National Organisation (UMNO) had political control. During this time Sabah Foundation continued its developmental efforts with little governmental intervention. In 1994 a Price Waterhouse audit revealed that Sabah Foundation accounts were missing more than $1 billion, evidence of accusations of corruption. At that time, Innoprise had more than a dozen subsidiaries with little oversight. Based upon the audit results, Sabah Foundation was reorganised, governmental officials were to site on its board of trustees and Chief Minister Datuk Salleh Tun Said chaired the board.

In 2012 allegations were brought against the foundation's former Chief Minister Musa Aman for embezzling over $90 million from the foundation.

In 2018, Shafie Apdal, Sabah Foundation chairman, ordered a full investigation into the financial affairs of Rakyat Berjaya, which is fully owned by the foundation.

== Organisation ==
Sabah Foundation is now under the Sabah Government with three organisational divisions:

- Sapangar SDN. BHD
- Innoprise Corporation SDN. BHD
- KKYS SDN. BHD

=== Research library ===
Within Sabah Foundation's Tun Mustapha Tower headquarters complex is the Fuad Stephens Borneo Research Library, named for former Chief Minister Tun Fuad Stephens. It was established with the support of the National Library of Malaysia, Mara Institute of Technology Library, Sabah State Library, Universiti Kebangsaan Malaysia Library and the Sabah State Museum Librarian. It is a three-level building with a total area of 3,135.48 square metres. Its objective is to "undertake strategic initiatives to function as a primary information resource center - contributing towards establishing a knowledge-economic society."

== Reception ==
Foundation trustees and staff are appointed by the chief minister. The foundation likened to Indonesian President Suharto's administration and "heavily criticised for its partisan nature" assuming that it "was a device for imposing mainstream Malay culture onto Dayak (and in particular Iban) youth". One year after the organisation's creation, Sabah Foundation's founder, Tun Mustapha Harun, became chief minister of Sabah.

=== Environmental issues ===
In the 1970s, logging increased in its concession area. Sabah Foundation has a 100-year logging concession. Conversion of forest areas to land for oil palms is a major threat for rainforests. Some forest areas are conserved, however. 14 Borneo pygmy elephants were found dead in a concession area of Sabah Foundation within two weeks in 2013, the cause likely being poisoning.

=== Educational initiatives ===
The Sabah Foundation is involved in a number of educational initiatives in Sabah including the Sabah Foundation Technical College (KTYS) and the University College Sabah Foundation.

== See also ==
- Sabah Foundation Tower
- Wisma Innoprise
- Double Six Tragedy 1976 plane crash
