= List of Malaysian State Assembly Representatives (1969–1974) =

Subnational legislature representatives

List of Malaysian State Assembly Representatives (1964–1969)
List of Malaysian State Assembly Representatives (1969–1974)
List of Malaysian State Assembly Representatives (1974–1978)

The following are the members of the Dewan Undangan Negeri or state assemblies, elected in the 1969 state election and by-elections. Also included is the list of the Sabah state assembly members who were elected in 1971.

== Perlis ==
No.	State Constituency	Member	Party
Alliance 11 | PMIP 1
N01	Kaki Bukit	Loh Ah Tong	Alliance (MCA)
N02	Paya	Che Yook @ Che Yob Che Choh	Alliance (UMNO)
N03	Mata Ayer	Abdullah Hassan	Alliance (UMNO)
N04	Bandar Kangar	Tan Thean Choo from 6 April 1974	Alliance (MCA)
N04	Bandar Kangar	Quah Chooi Tong until 1974	Alliance (MCA)
N05	Sena	Wan Ahmad Wan Kassim	Alliance (UMNO)
N06	Bintong	Syed Omar Syed Hussin	Alliance (UMNO)
N07	Kurong Anai	Wan Ahmad Wan Abdullah	Alliance (UMNO)
N08	Arau	Hussain Abdul Rahman	PMIP
N09	Utan Aji	Syed Darus Syed Hashim	Alliance (UMNO)
N10	Kayang	Yusoff Abu Bakar	Alliance (UMNO)
N11	Kuala Perlis	Sheikh Ahmad Mohd Hashim	Alliance (UMNO)
N12	Sanglang	Jaafar Hassan	Alliance (UMNO)

== Kedah ==
No.	State Constituency	Member	Party
Alliance 14 | PMIP 8 | Gerakan 2
N01	Jitra	Osman @ Mohd Daud Aroff	Alliance (UMNO)
N02	Padang Terap	Syed Ahmad Syed Mahmud Shahabudin	Alliance (UMNO)
N03	Jerlun-Kodiang	Syed Nahar Syed Sheh Shahabudin	Alliance (UMNO)
N04	Tunjang	Ismail Hanafi	PMIP
N05	Langgar-Limbong	Abu Bakar Umar	PMIP
N06	Pokok Sena	Ahmad Lebai Senawi	PMIP
N07	Alor Star Pekan	Geh Teng Kheng	Gerakan
N08	Alor Star Luar	Othman Husain	PMIP
N09	Langkawi	Ahmad Husain	Alliance (UMNO)
N10	Kota Star Barat	Isamudin Ahmad	PMIP
N11	Kangkong-Bukit Raya	Ismail @ Shafiee Kassim	PMIP
N12	Pendang	Abdul Manaf Abdullah	Alliance (UMNO)
N13	Sik-Gurun	Harun Jusoh	PMIP
N14	Kota	Mansor Akil	Alliance (UMNO)
N15	Sala	Ahmad Shukri Abdul Shukur	PMIP
N16	Yen-Merbok	Abdullah Lebai Ismail from 22 May 1971	Alliance (UMNO)
N16	Yen-Merbok	Lebai Ismail Abdul Wahab until 21 April 1971	Alliance (UMNO)
N17	Baling Timor	Harun Abdullah	Alliance (UMNO)
N18	Baling Barat	Othman @ Ismail Mat Hassan	Alliance (UMNO)
N19	Pekan Sungei Patani	Ong Boon Seong	Gerakan
N20	Sungei Patani Luar	Salleh Ishak	Alliance (UMNO)
N21	Sidam	Yassin Ibrahim from 21 August 1971	Alliance (UMNO)
N21	Sidam	Hanafi Mohd. Yunus until 20 July 1971	Alliance (UMNO)
N22	Lunas	Soon Cheng Leong	Alliance (MCA)
N23	Kulim	Leong Man Kai	Alliance (MCA)
N24	Bandar Bahru	Zainuddin Din	Alliance (UMNO)

== Kelantan ==
No.	State Constituency	Member	Party
PMIP 19 | Alliance 11
N01	Tumpat Timor	Omar Awang Kechik	Alliance (UMNO)
N02	Tumpat Tengah	Che Lat Kassim	Alliance (UMNO)
N03	Tumpat Barat	Ismail Cik Ali from 26 February 1972	PMIP
N03	Tumpat Barat	Wan Salleh @ Wan Abdullah Wan Sulaiman until 1972	PMIP
N04	Kuala Kelantan	Wan Mamat Wan Yusoff	PMIP
N05	Kota Bharu Utara	Abdullah Ahmad	PMIP
N06	Kota Bharu Pantai	Nik Abdullah Arshad	PMIP
N07	Tendong	Mohamed Nasir	PMIP
N08	Meranti	Nik Man Nik Mohamed	PMIP
N09	Bandar Pasir Mas	Omar Awang	PMIP
N10	Bandar Hilir	Foo Chow Yong @ Foo Hong Sang	Alliance (MCA)
N11	Bandar Hulu	Hassan Yaacob	PMIP
N12	Kota Bharu Tengah	Salahuddin Abdullah from 10 February 1973	PMIP
N12	Kota Bharu Tengah	Mohamad Asri Muda until 1973	PMIP
N13	Bachok Utara	Mohd. Nor Yusoff	PMIP
N14	Bachok Tengah	Mohd. Amin Ya'akub	PMIP
N15	Bachok Selatan	Mohamed Yacob	PMIP
N16	Kota Bharu Timor	Wan Hashim Wan Ahmad	PMIP
N17	Kota Bharu Barat	Abdul Rahman Awang Sulong	PMIP
N18	Kota Bharu Selatan	Ishak Lotfi Omar	PMIP
N19	Lemal	Haron Sulong	PMIP
N20	Rantau Panjang	Hussein Ahmad	Alliance (UMNO)
N21	Tok Uban	Wan Hassan Wan Daud	PMIP
N22	Pasir Puteh Utara	Abdul Kadir Mat Sa'ad	PMIP
N23	Pasir Puteh Tengah	Raja Mahmud Raja Mamat from 9 March 1974	Alliance (UMNO)
N23	Pasir Puteh Tengah	Muhammad Ismail until 4 February 1974	Alliance (UMNO)
N24	Pasir Puteh Tenggara	Mohamed Idris	Alliance (UMNO)
N25	Machang Utara	Mohyiddin @ Che Kadir Che Tengah	Alliance (UMNO)
N26	Tanah Merah Timor	Omar Muhamed @ Mamat	PMIP
N27	Tanah Merah Barat	Nik Abdullah Nik Daud	Alliance (UMNO)
N28	Machang Selatan	Yaacob Ismail	Alliance (UMNO)
N29	Ulu Kelantan Timor	Yusoff Mohamed Salleh	Alliance (UMNO)
N30	Ulu Kelantan Barat	Tengku Razaleigh Hamzah	Alliance (UMNO)

== Trengganu ==
No.	State Constituency	Member	Party
Alliance 13 | PMIP 11
N01	Kuala Besut	Mohamad Said	PMIP
N02	Kampong Raja	Wan Ishak Ali	Alliance (UMNO)
N03	Ulu Besut	Jabir Mohamed Shah	Alliance (UMNO)
N04	Besut Tengah	Dollah Jusoh	Alliance (UMNO)
N05	Setiu	Abdul Ghani Mat Amin	Alliance (UMNO)
N06	Batu Rakit	Nik Hassan Abdul Rahman from 21 August 1971	Alliance (UMNO)
N06	Batu Rakit	Mansor Mohamed until 1971	Alliance (UMNO)
N07	Kuala Nerus	Abdul Rashid Ngah from 17 November 1973	Alliance (UMNO)
N07	Kuala Nerus	Ibrahim Fikri Mohamed until 1973	Alliance (UMNO)
N08	Jeram	Hashim Embong	PMIP
N09	Langkap	Abdul Rahman Long	Alliance (UMNO)
N10	Bandar	Toh Seng Chong	Alliance (MCA)
N11	Ladang	Wan Mohamed Wan Ngah	PMIP
N12	Bukit Besar	Mohamed Ghazali Ahmad	PMIP
N13	Batu Burok	Mat Yasin Daud	PMIP
N14	Marang	Kasim Ahmad	PMIP
N15	Sura	Ibrahim Mohamed Noh	PMIP
N16	Ulu Dungun	Omar Shukri Embong	PMIP
N17	Paka-Kerteh	Sulong Mahmood	Alliance (UMNO)
N18	Kemaman Utara	Wan Abdul Ghani Zainal	Alliance (UMNO)
N19	Chukai	Teh Hassan	Alliance (UMNO)
N20	Kemaman Selatan	Wan Yahya Wan Mohd.	PMIP
N21	Kuala Trengganu Tengah	Mohamed @ Harun Jusoh	PMIP
N22	Binjai	Mohamed Taib Ismail	PMIP
N23	Ulu Trengganu Timor	Abdul Rahman Kassim	Alliance (UMNO)
N24	Ulu Trengganu Barat	Mahmood Sulaiman	Alliance (UMNO)

== Penang ==
No.	State Constituency	Member	Party
Gerakan 16 | Alliance 4 | DAP 3 | PSRM 1
N01	Butterworth	Ooi Ah Bee	Gerakan
N02	Bagan Ajam	Ong Yi How	Gerakan
N03	Permatang Pauh	Mohamad Nor Bakar	Alliance (UMNO)
N04	Bukit Mertajam	Ooh Chooi Cheng	Gerakan
N05	Alma	Harun Sirat	Gerakan
N06	Sungei Bakap	Veerappen Veerathan	Gerakan
N07	Nibong Tebal	Teoh Kooi Sneah @ Teoh Chung Hor	Gerakan
N08	Kelawei	Yeap Ghim Guan	DAP
N09	Doby Ghaut	Khoo Teng Chye	Gerakan
N10	Tanjong Bungah	Khoo Soo Giap	DAP
N11	Ayer Itam	Tan Phock Kin	Gerakan
N12	Jelutong	Koay Boon Seng	DAP
N13	Glugor	Stewart Dennis Connolly	Gerakan
N14	Balik Pulau	Abdul Rahman Yunus	PSRM
N15	Bayan Lepas	Ismail Hashim	Alliance (UMNO)
N16	Kota	Lim Chong Eu	Gerakan
N17	Tanjong Tengah	Tan Gim Hwa	Gerakan
N18	Tanjong Utara	Khoo Kay Por	Gerakan
N19	Tanjong Barat	Teh Ewe Lim	Gerakan
N20	Sungei Pinang	Chelliah Poosary	Gerakan
N21	Tanjong Selatan	Wong Choong Woh	Gerakan
N22	Muda	Abdul Kadir Hassan from 11 December 1971	Alliance (UMNO)
N22	Muda	Ismail Che Chik until 1971	Alliance (UMNO)
N23	Kepala Batas	Ahmad Abdullah	Alliance (UMNO)
N24	Tasek Glugor	Mustapha Hussain	Gerakan

== Perak ==
No.	State Constituency	Member	Party
Alliance 19 | PPP 12 | DAP 6 | GERAKAN 2 | PMIP 1
N01	Grik	Wan Mohamed Wan Teh	Alliance (UMNO)
N02	Lenggong	Ahmad Said	Alliance (UMNO)
N03	Parit Buntar	Halimah Abdul Raof	Alliance (UMNO)
N04	Kuala Kurau	Ismail Daud	Alliance (UMNO)
N05	Bagan Serai	Masud Untoi	Alliance (UMNO)
N06	Gunong Semanggol	Ahmad Yusof	Alliance (UMNO)
N07	Larut	Kamaruddin Mohamed Isa	Alliance (UMNO)
N08	Selama	Hussein Yaacob	Alliance (UMNO)
N09	Matang	Ang Chin Wah	Gerakan
N10	Taiping	Lim Eng Chuan	Gerakan
N11	Ayer Tawar	Su Liang Yu	PPP
N12	Pengkalan Bharu	Ishak Mohamed	Alliance (UMNO)
N13	Lekir	Yeoh Eng Chai	DAP
N14	Lumut	Phuang Teik Hua	DAP
N15	Karai	Mohamed Ali Zaini Mohamed Zain	Alliance (UMNO)
N16	Jalong	R. C. Mahadeva Rayan	PPP
N17	Senggang	Abdullah Abdul Raof	Alliance (UMNO)
N18	Padang Rengas	Shafie Mat Saman	Alliance (UMNO)
N19	Blanja	Hisan Ibrahim	Alliance (UMNO)
N20	Kampong Gajah	Mahmud Zainal Abidin	PMIP
N21	Sungei Raia	Samsudin Harun	PPP
N22	Chemor	Theam Moi Tuck	PPP
N23	Pekan Lama	Khong Kok Yat	PPP
N24	Pekan Bharu	Chan Yoon Onn	PPP
N25	Pasir Puteh	Foo Kuan Sze	PPP
N26	Kuala Pari	S. P. Seenivasagam	PPP
N27	Pusing	Yap Boon En	PPP
N28	Tanjong Tualang	Lim Cho Hock	DAP
N29	Gopeng	J. R. Suppiah	PPP
N30	Kuala Dipang	Chan Heng Woh	DAP
N31	Sungei Manik	Yahya Shubban Harun	Alliance (UMNO)
N32	Bandar	Ahmad Razali Mohamed	Alliance (UMNO)
N33	Pasir Bedamar	K. Ramasamy	PPP
N34	Batak Rabit	Felix Anthony	DAP
N35	Rungkup	Loppe Hashim Ketong	Alliance (UMNO)
N36	Hutan Melintang	Mohd. Abas Ahmad	Alliance (UMNO)
N37	Tapah Road	Ibrahim Singgeh	DAP
N38	Tapah	Hor Seng	Alliance (MCA)
N39	Bidor	Chin Kee Seong	PPP
N40	Slim	R. M. Idris	Alliance (UMNO)

== Pahang ==
No.	State Constituency	Member	Party
Alliance 20 | PSRM 2 | Gerakan 1 | IND 1
N01	Cameron Highlands	Wong Lok Hoi	Gerakan
N02	Dong	Che Yeop Sendiri Hussin	Alliance (UMNO)
N03	Bandar Raub	Loke Kwok Kheong	Alliance (MCA)
N04	Tras	Tengku Mustapha Tengku Setia Alam	Alliance (UMNO)
N05	Sabai	Abu Bakar Ahmad	Alliance (UMNO)
N06	Bandar Bentong	Chow Seng Tong	Alliance (MCA)
N07	Benus	Lo Chiew Chuen	IND
N08	Mentekab	Syed Abdullah Syed Ali	Alliance (UMNO)
N09	Tanah Puteh	Sivasubramaniam Sivasambandan	PSRM
N10	Telok Sisek	Mahimon Harun	Alliance (UMNO)
N11	Beserah	Abdul Aziz Ahmad	Alliance (UMNO)
N12	Ulu Kuantan	Mohd Ramly Ismail	PSRM
N13	Kuala Pahang	Muhammad Jusoh	Alliance (UMNO)
N14	Pahang Tua	M. Mokhtar M. Daud	Alliance (UMNO)
N15	Rompin	Ibrahim Arshad	Alliance (UMNO)
N16	Chenor	Wan Ahmad Tajuddin Wan Hassan	Alliance (UMNO)
N17	Triang	Lum Wah Kum @ Lum Ban Kee	Alliance (MCA)
N18	Kuala Semantan	Awang Ngah Tok Muda Ibrahim	Alliance (UMNO)
N19	Jenderak	Mohamed Yusoff Long	Alliance (UMNO)
N20	Sanggang	Yahya Mohd Seth	Alliance (UMNO)
N21	Jelai	Wan Abdul Rahman Wan Ibrahim	Alliance (UMNO)
N22	Kuala Lipis	Ong Seong Seung	Alliance (MCA)
N23	Tanjong Besar	Abu Samah Idris	Alliance (UMNO)
N24	Jerantut	Mohamed Khairuddin Mohamed Kawi	Alliance (UMNO)

== Selangor ==
No.	State Constituency	Member	Party
Alliance 14 | DAP 9 | Gerakan 4 | IND 1
N01	Tanjong Karang	Kamaruzaman Ahmad	Alliance (UMNO)
N02	Kuala Selangor Pekan	N. S. Maniam	Alliance (MIC)
N03	Kepong	Tan Chee Khoon	Gerakan
N04	Penchala	Hor Cheok Foon	DAP
N05	Jeram	Hussain Abdullah	Alliance (UMNO)
N06	Sementa	Chua Kow Eng	DAP
N07	Serendah	Ganga Nayar	Gerakan
N08	Kuang	Chew Ngan @ Chou Yew Koh	Gerakan
N09	Kajang	Mohamed Azmir Mohamed Nazir from 3 November 1973	Alliance (UMNO)
N09	Kajang	Mohamed Nazir Abdul Jalil until 1973	Alliance (UMNO)
N10	Semenyih	Salmah Mohd. Salleh	Alliance (UMNO)
N11	Ampang	Wong Swee Oy	DAP
N12	Sentul	Lee Beng Cheang	DAP
N13	Pantai	V. David	Gerakan
N14	Salak	Goh Hock Guan	DAP
N15	Bukit Nanas	Lee Lam Thye	DAP
N16	Kampong Bharu	Ahmad Razali Mohd. Ali	Alliance (UMNO)
N17	Serdang	Yap Pian Hon	DAP
N18	Bukit Raja	K. Ramasen	DAP
N19	Port Swettenham	Raja Zulkifli Raja Borhan	Alliance (UMNO)
N20	Kampong Jawa	Lim Thian Kheng	DAP
N21	Telok Datoh	Hormat Rafei	Alliance (UMNO)
N22	Morib	Harun Idris	Alliance (UMNO)
N23	Dengkil	Suhaimi Kamaruddin	Alliance (UMNO)
N24	Sungei Rawang	Lim Tuan Siong	IND
N25	Sabak	Lope Salleh Long @ Zainal Abidin	Alliance (UMNO)
N26	Sungei Besar	Taiban Hassan	Alliance (UMNO)
N27	Ulu Bernam	Shoib Ahmad	Alliance (UMNO)
N28	Kuala Kubu	Chan Keong Hon	Alliance (MCA)

== Negri Sembilan ==
No.	State Constituency	Member	Party
Alliance 16 | DAP 8
N01	Sri Menanti	Mansor Othman	Alliance (UMNO)
N02	Johol	Sapiah Talib	Alliance (UMNO)
N03	Ulu Muar	Abdul Kadir Abdullah	Alliance (UMNO)
N04	Pilah	Mohd Idris Matsil	Alliance (UMNO)
N05	Rantau	S. V. Veloo	Alliance (MIC)
N06	Sungei Ujong	Liew Ah Kim	DAP
N07	Rahang	Chen Man Hin	DAP
N08	Terentang	Mohamed Redza Mohamed Said	Alliance (UMNO)
N09	Kota	Dahalan Aman	Alliance (UMNO)
N10	Tampin	Mohamad Taha Talib	Alliance (UMNO)
N11	Gemas	Lim Heng Seng	Alliance (MCA)
N12	Jimah	Oh Keng Seng	DAP
N13	Lukut	Chin Chan Sung	DAP
N14	Si Rusa	Hassan Ahmad	DAP
N15	Pasir Panjang	Lee Geok Shean	DAP
N16	Linggi	Soorian Arjunan	DAP
N17	Kuala Klawang	Lim Kim Kee	Alliance (MCA)
N18	Pertang	Aminuddin Abdul Manap	Alliance (UMNO)
N19	Bahau	Thong Hiang Kim	Alliance (MCA)
N20	Rompin	Yee Kok Ching	Alliance (MCA)
N21	Jempol	Mohd. Khatib Mohd. Noor	Alliance (UMNO)
N22	Lenggeng	Zainal Abidin Mohd Lati	Alliance (UMNO)
N23	Labu	Salleh Kassim	Alliance (UMNO)
N24	Bukit Nanas	S. Seevaratnam	DAP

== Malacca ==
No.	State Constituency	Member	Party
Alliance 15 | DAP 4 | PEKEMAS 1
N01	Tanjong Kling	Ahmad Manaf	Alliance (UMNO)
N02	Bukit Rambai	Lim Yak Tye	DAP
N03	Batu Berendam	Mohamed Abdul Rahman	Alliance (UMNO)
N04	Semabok	Ng Chong Chee	Alliance (MCA)
N05	Kandang	Abdul Hadi Abas	Alliance (UMNO)
N06	Kota Selatan	Tan Giap Seng	PEKEMAS (Note: Tan Giap Seng contested the general election as a candidate of Parti Gerakan Rakyat Malaysia (GERAKAN), He later join PEKEMAS.)
N07	Kota Tengah	Michael Khong Chye Huat	DAP
N08	Kota Barat	Ho Mong Yew	DAP
N09	Kota Utara	Tan Cheng Swee	Alliance (MCA)
N10	Kota Timor	Bernard Sta Maria	DAP
N11	Sungei Bahru	Johari Yusof from 18 May 1974	Alliance (UMNO)
N11	Sungei Bahru	Abdullah Samad until 1974	Alliance (UMNO)
N12	Ramuan China	Abdul Ghani Ali	Alliance (UMNO)
N13	Masjid Tanah	Abdul Ghani Ishak	Alliance (UMNO)
N14	Alor Gajah	Talib Karim	Alliance (UMNO)
N15	Pulau Sebang	Yeow Kay	Alliance (MCA)
N16	Batang Malacca	Ahmad Joned	Alliance (UMNO)
N17	Rim	Mohamed Jiddi Abdullah	Alliance (UMNO)
N18	Jasin	Tan Nai Kwi	Alliance (MCA)
N19	Serkam	Hussein Yahya	Alliance (UMNO)
N20	Sungei Rambai	Ahmad Dahlan Salleh	Alliance (UMNO)

== Johore ==
No.	State Constituency	Member	Party
Alliance 30 | DAP 1 | IND 1
N01	Bukit Serampang	Abdul Rahman Mahmud	Alliance (UMNO)
N02	Jorak	Othman Saat	Alliance (UMNO)
N03	Labis	Teo Ah Kiang @ Chiang Kee Foon	Alliance (MCA)
N04	Bekok	Ng Nam Seng from 15 May 1971	Alliance (MCA)
N04	Bekok	Sim Kim Chong @ Siew Ah See until 25 December 1970	Alliance (MCA)
N05	Bandar Maharani	Chua Song Lim	Alliance (MCA)
N06	Parit Bakar	Mohamed Zin Maidin from 15 June 1974	Alliance (UMNO)
N06	Parit Bakar	Abdul Aziz Ishak until 1974	Alliance (UMNO)
N07	Simpang Kiri	Othman Taib	Alliance (UMNO)
N08	Parit Jawa	Zaharah Abdul Majid	Alliance (UMNO)
N09	Broleh	Mohd Salleh Tahir	Alliance (UMNO)
N10	Bandar Penggaram	Tan Siew Yong	Alliance (MCA)
N11	Tanjong Sembrong	Ridwan Salim Bilal	Alliance (UMNO)
N12	Ayer Hitam	Yusa Nawawi	Alliance (UMNO)
N13	Gunong Lambak	Lee Kaw	DAP
N14	Sri Lalang	Loh Fook Yen	Alliance (MCA)
N15	Kota Tinggi	Tan Seng Toon	Alliance (MCA)
N16	Johore Lama	Mohamed Yusoff Jani from 22 October 1973	Alliance (UMNO)
N16	Johore Lama	Ismail Sa'adon until 1973	Alliance (UMNO)
N17	Rengit	Jalok Daing Malibok	Alliance (UMNO)
N18	Benut	Talib Ali	Alliance (UMNO)
N19	Pontian Dalam	Mohamed Yassin Abdul Rahman	Alliance (UMNO)
N20	Pontian Kechil	Abdullah Sudin	IND
N21	Rengam	Syed Zain Edros Al-Shahab	Alliance (UMNO)
N22	Senai-Kulai	Lau Tong	Alliance (MCA)
N23	Plentong	Hasnah Ahmad	Alliance (UMNO)
N24	Tanjong Petri	Abdul Hamid Rahmat	Alliance (UMNO)
N25	Glang Patah	Syed Mohamed Edros	Alliance (UMNO)
N26	Tampoi	Elias Udin	Alliance (UMNO)
N27	Endau	Ramli Othman	Alliance (UMNO)
N28	Mersing	Poh Swee Lim	Alliance (MCA)
N29	Batu Anam	G. Pasamanickam	Alliance (MIC)
N30	Bandar Segamat	Tan Peng Khoon	Alliance (MCA)
N31	Tangkak	Lai Kuen Tee	Alliance (MCA)
N32	Serom	Ngah Abdul Rahman	Alliance (UMNO)

== Sabah ==
=== 1971–1976 ===
No.	State Constituency	Member	Party
USNO 28 | SCA 4
N01	Kudat	Abdul Salam Harun	Alliance (USNO)
N02	Bengkoka-Banggi	Mustapha Harun	Alliance (USNO)
N03	Langkon	Idrus Mustakim	Alliance (USNO)
N04	Tandek	Majuning Majun @ Mohd Omar	Alliance (USNO)
N05	Usukan	Mohammad Said Keruak	Alliance (USNO)
N06	Sorob	Ismail Gimbad	Alliance (USNO)
N07	Sulaman	Dahlan Harun	Alliance (USNO)
N08	Kiulu	Payar Juman	Alliance (USNO)
N09	Jesselton Bandar	Pang Tet Tshung	Alliance (SCA)
N10	Tanjong Aru	Herman Luping	Alliance (USNO)
N11	Moyog	Peter Joinud Mojuntin	Alliance (USNO)
N12	Papar	Salleh Ibrahim	Alliance (USNO)
N13	Bongawan	Aliudin Harun	Alliance (USNO)
N14	Kuala Penyu	Fadzil Wong Fook Siang	Alliance (USNO)
N15	Labuan	Mohammed Omar Beldram from 10 December 1975	Alliance (USNO)
N15	Labuan	Harris Salleh until 11 November 1975	Alliance (USNO)
N16	Beaufort	Mohd Dun Banir	Alliance (USNO)
N17	Tenom	Tingkalor Lampang	Alliance (USNO)
N18	Sipitang-Ulu Padas	Mohamed Yassin Hashim	Alliance (USNO)
N19	Keningau	Anthony Undan Andulag	Alliance (USNO)
N20	Pensiangan-Sook	Stephen Koroh	Alliance (USNO)
N21	Ranau	Abdul Ghani Ahmad	Alliance (USNO)
N22	Tambunan	Anthony Gibon	Alliance (USNO)
N23	Sandakan Bandar	Tan Tze Shu	Alliance (SCA)
N24	Elopura	Ngui Tet Loi from 4 August 1973	Alliance (SCA)
N24	Elopura	Ngui Tet Min until July 1973	Alliance (SCA)
N25	Sugut	Habib Abdul Rahman Habib Mahmud	Alliance (USNO)
N26	Labuk	Salleh Otik	Alliance (USNO)
N27	Kuala Kinabatangan	Pengiran Galpam Pengiran Indar from 10 December 1975	Alliance (USNO)
N27	Kuala Kinabatangan	Salleh Sulong until 11 November 1975	Alliance (USNO)
N28	Lamag	Pg Mohd Ismail Pg Siat	Alliance (USNO)
N29	Lahad Datu	Johari Ariff	Alliance (USNO)
N30	Semporna	Sakaran Dandai	Alliance (USNO)
N31	Merotai	Mohamad Kassim Kamidin	Alliance (USNO)
N32	Balung	Edwin Chan Foo Sang	Alliance (SCA)

== Sarawak ==
No.	State Constituency	Member	Party
Alliance 15 | SNAP 12 | SUPP 12 | Pesaka 8 | IND 1
N01	Lundu	Chong Kim Mook	SUPP
N02	Bau	Ong Ah Khim	SUPP
N03	Kuching Barat	Abang Abu Bakar Abang Mustapha from 15 December 1973	Alliance (BUMIPUTERA)
N03	Kuching Barat	Shahbuddin Cheng Yew Kiew until 1973	Alliance (SCA)
N04	Kuching Timor	Stephen Yong Kuet Tze	SUPP
N05	Semariang	Ajibah Abol	Alliance (BUMIPUTERA)
N06	Sekama	Sim Kheng Hong	SUPP
N07	Sebandi	Sulaiman Daud from 27 January 1973	Alliance (BUMIPUTERA)
N07	Sebandi	Ikhwan Zainei until 1973	Alliance (BUMIPUTERA)
N08	Muara Tuang	Mohamad Musa	Alliance (BUMIPUTERA)
N09	Batu Kawah	Chong Kiun Kong	SUPP
N10	Bengoh	Segus Ginyai	SUPP
N11	Tarat	Nelson Kundai Ngareng	SNAP
N12	Tebakang	Michael Ben Panggi	SNAP
N13	Semera	Mohammed Puteh @ Lee Thiam Kee	Alliance (BUMIPUTERA)
N14	Gedong	Abang Abdul Rahim Abang Moasili	Alliance (BUMIPUTERA)
N15	Lingga-Sebuyau	Tawi Sli	PESAKA
N16	Simanggang	Nelson Liap Kudu	SNAP
N17	Engkilili-Skrang	Alfred Jabu Numpang from January 1974	PESAKA
N17	Engkilili-Skrang	Simon Dembab Maja until 1974	PESAKA
N18	Ulu Ai	David Jemut	SNAP
N19	Saribas	Kihok Amat	Alliance (BUMIPUTERA)
N20	Layar	Stephen Kalong Ningkan	SNAP
N21	Kalaka	Wan Alwi Tuanku Ibrahim	PESAKA
N22	Krian	Dunstan Endawie Enchana	SNAP
N23	Kuala Rajang	Abdul Rahman Ya'kub	Alliance (BUMIPUTERA)
N24	Repok	Khoo Peng Loong	SUPP
N25	Matu-Daro	Awang Hipni Pengiran Anu	Alliance (BUMIPUTERA)
N26	Binatang	Anthony Teo Tiao Gin	SUPP
N27	Sibu Tengah	Chew Kim Poon	SUPP
N28	Sibu Luar	Wong Kah Sing	SUPP
N29	Igan	Ling Beng Siong	Alliance (SCA)
N30	Dudong	Kong Chung Siew	SUPP
N31	Balingian	Mohd. Pauzi Hamdani	Alliance (BUMIPUTERA)
N32	Oya	Vincent Ferrer Suyong	Alliance (BUMIPUTERA)
N33	Pakan	Mandi Sanar	PESAKA
N34	Meluan	Gramong Jelian	SNAP
N35	Machan	Thomas Kana	PESAKA
N36	Ngemah	Lias Kana	IND
N36	Ngemah	Lias Kana	PESAKA
N37	Song	Ngelambong Banggau	SNAP
N38	Pelagus	Leonard Linggi Jugah from 17 July 1971	PESAKA
N38	Pelagus	Bennet Jarrow until 1971	PESAKA
N39	Baleh	Kenneth Kenyan Temenggong Koh	PESAKA
N40	Belaga	Nyipa Kilah @ Nyipa Bato	SUPP
N41	Tatau	Awang Ismail Pengiran Zainuddin	Alliance (BUMIPUTERA)
N42	Kemena	Abok Jalin	PESAKA
N43	Subis	Francis Loke	SNAP
N44	Miri	Chia Chin Shin	Alliance (SCA)
N45	Marudi	Edward Jeli Belayong	SNAP
N46	Telang Usan	Joseph Balan Seling	SNAP
N47	Limbang	James Wong Kim Min	SNAP
N48	Lawas	Awang Daud Pengiran Matusin	Alliance (BUMIPUTERA)
