= List of Malaysian State Assembly Representatives (1964–1969) =

Subnational legislature representatives

List of Malaysian State Assembly Representatives (1959–1964)
List of Malaysian State Assembly Representatives (1964–1969)
List of Malaysian State Assembly Representatives (1969–1974)

The following are the members of the Dewan Undangan Negeri or state assemblies, elected in the 1964 state election and by-elections. Also included is the list of the Singapore and Sabah state assembly members who were elected in 1963 and 1967 respectively.

== Perlis ==
No.	State Constituency	Member	Party
Alliance 11 | PMIP 1
N01	Kaki Bukit	Loh Ah Tong	Alliance (MCA)
N02	Paya	Che Yook @ Che Yob Che Choh	Alliance (UMNO)
N03	Mata Ayer	Abdullah Hassan	Alliance (UMNO)
N04	Bandar Kangar	Por Swee Giap	Alliance (MCA)
N05	Sena	Wan Ahmad Wan Kassim	Alliance (UMNO)
N06	Bintong	Syed Omar Syed Hussin	Alliance (UMNO)
N07	Kurong Anai	Wan Ahmad Wan Abdullah	Alliance (UMNO)
N08	Arau	Tengku Adnan Tengku Yahya	Alliance (UMNO)
N09	Utan Aji	Taharim Ariffin	PMIP
N10	Kayang	Yusoff Abu Bakar	Alliance (UMNO)
N11	Kuala Perlis	Sheikh Ahmad Mohd Hashim	Alliance (UMNO)
N12	Sanglang	Ahmad Musa	Alliance (UMNO)

== Kedah ==
No.	State Constituency	Member	Party
Alliance 24
N01	Jitra	Mohamed Zain Ahmad from 19 August 1965	Alliance (UMNO)
N01	Jitra	Omar Salleh until 1965	Alliance (UMNO)
N02	Padang Terap	Syed Ahmad Syed Mahmud Shahabudin	Alliance (UMNO)
N03	Jerlun-Kodiang	Yahaya Jalil	Alliance (UMNO)
N04	Tunjang	Mustafa Ahmad	Alliance (UMNO)
N05	Langgar-Limbong	Omar Ahmad	Alliance (UMNO)
N06	Pokok Sena	Hamidah Omar	Alliance (UMNO)
N07	Alor Star Pekan	Tan Hai Loon	Alliance (MCA)
N08	Alor Star Luar	K. Karuna Karan Nair	Alliance (MIC)
N09	Langkawi	Omar S. Mohamad	Alliance (UMNO)
N10	Kota Star Barat	Ooi Eng Hong	Alliance (MCA)
N11	Kangkong-Bukit Raya	Ali Ismail	Alliance (UMNO)
N12	Pendang	Abdul Manaf Abdullah from 30 November 1968	Alliance (UMNO)
N12	Pendang	Syed Ibrahim Syed Kechik until 1968	Alliance (UMNO)
N13	Sik-Gurun	Sharimah Mahmud	Alliance (UMNO)
N14	Kota	Salleh Ishak	Alliance (UMNO)
N15	Sala	Arshad Tunku Ismail	Alliance (UMNO)
N16	Yen-Merbok	Ustaz Lebai Ismail Abdul Wahab	Alliance (UMNO)
N17	Baling Timor	Shafie Abdullah	Alliance (UMNO)
N18	Baling Barat	Mohammad Zain Yusoff from 27 January 1968	Alliance (UMNO)
N18	Baling Barat	Syed Omar Syed Abdullah Shahabudin until 26 December 1967	Alliance (UMNO)
N19	Pekan Sungei Patani	Chin Chin Cheang	Alliance (MCA)
N20	Sungei Patani Luar	Azahari Md. Taib	Alliance (UMNO)
N21	Sidam	Yassin Ibrahim	Alliance (UMNO)
N22	Lunas	Soon Cheng Leong	Alliance (MCA)
N23	Kulim	Leong Man Kai	Alliance (MCA)
N24	Bandar Bahru	Zainuddin Din	Alliance (UMNO)

== Kelantan ==
No.	State Constituency	Member	Party
PMIP 21 | Alliance 9
N01	Tumpat Timor	Omar Awang Kechik	Alliance (UMNO)
N02	Tumpat Tengah	Lat Kassim from 10 October 1964	Alliance (UMNO)
N02	Tumpat Tengah	Mahmood Mat Amin until 8 September 1964	Alliance (UMNO)
N03	Tumpat Barat	Daud Bin Yusof	PMIP
N04	Kuala Kelantan	Wan Yusoff Wan Ya'acob	PMIP
N05	Kota Bharu Utara	Abdullah Ahmad	PMIP
N06	Kota Bharu Pantai	Nik Abdullah Arshad	PMIP
N07	Tendong	Che Hassan	PMIP
N08	Meranti	Nik Man Nik Mohamed	PMIP
N09	Bandar Pasir Mas	Omar Awang	PMIP
N10	Bandar Hilir	Foo Chow Yong @ Foo Hong Sang	Alliance (MCA)
N11	Bandar Hulu	Ibrahim Ismail	Alliance (UMNO)
N12	Kota Bharu Tengah	Mohamad Asri Muda	PMIP
N13	Bachok Utara	Mohamad Nor Ismail from 6 April 1968	PMIP
N13	Bachok Utara	Shafie Ahmad until 1968	PMIP
N14	Bachok Tengah	Mohd. Amin Ya'akub	PMIP
N15	Bachok Selatan	Othman Ismail	PMIP
N16	Kota Bharu Timor	Saufi Idris	PMIP
N17	Kota Bharu Barat	Abdul Rahman Awang Sulong	PMIP
N18	Kota Bharu Selatan	Ishak Lotfi Omar	PMIP
N19	Lemal	Haron Sulong	PMIP
N20	Rantau Panjang	Ahmad Yatim	PMIP
N21	Tok Uban	Abdullah Yusoff	PMIP
N22	Pasir Puteh Utara	Abdul Kadir Mat Sa'ad	PMIP
N23	Pasir Puteh Tengah	Muhammad Ismail	Alliance (UMNO)
N24	Pasir Puteh Tenggara	Abd. Rahman Mohd. Salleh	PMIP
N25	Machang Utara	Mohyiddin @ Che Kadir Che Tengah	Alliance (UMNO)
N26	Tanah Merah Timor	Omar Muhamed @ Mamat	PMIP
N27	Tanah Merah Barat	Yusoff Abd. Latiff	PMIP
N28	Machang Selatan	Yaacob Ismail	Alliance (UMNO)
N29	Ulu Kelantan Timor	Yusoff Mohamed Salleh	Alliance (UMNO)
N30	Ulu Kelantan Barat	Ismail Daud	Alliance (UMNO)

== Trengganu ==
No.	State Constituency	Member	Party
Alliance 21 | PMIP 3
N01	Kuala Besut	Zakariah Muda	Alliance (UMNO)
N02	Kampong Raja	Wan Ishak Ali	Alliance (UMNO)
N03	Ulu Besut	Lokman Abdul Kadir	PMIP
N04	Besut Tengah	Hussein Osman	PMIP
N05	Setiu	Abd. Ghani Mat Amin	Alliance (UMNO)
N06	Batu Rakit	Mansor Mohamed	Alliance (UMNO)
N07	Kuala Nerus	Ibrahim Fikri Mohamed	Alliance (UMNO)
N08	Jeram	Abdul Rashid Mohamed	Alliance (UMNO)
N09	Langkap	Abdul Rahman Long	Alliance (UMNO)
N10	Bandar	Tan Eng Aun	Alliance (MCA)
N11	Ladang	Wan Daud Wan Ahmad	Alliance (UMNO)
N12	Bukit Besar	Pengaran Chik	Alliance (UMNO)
N13	Batu Burok	Abdul Muttalib Salleh	Alliance (UMNO)
N14	Marang	Abdullah Mohamed	Alliance (UMNO)
N15	Sura	Wan Din Embong	Alliance (UMNO)
N16	Ulu Dungun	Abdul Wahab Yunus	PMIP
N17	Paka-Kerteh	Sulong Mahmood	Alliance (UMNO)
N18	Kemaman Utara	Wan Abdul Ghani Zainal	Alliance (UMNO)
N19	Chukai	Mohd Taha Embong	Alliance (UMNO)
N20	Kemaman Selatan	Wan Ismail Wan Musa	Alliance (UMNO)
N21	Kuala Trengganu Tengah	Engku Wok Abdul Rahman Abdul Kadir	Alliance (UMNO)
N22	Binjai	Ahmad Omar	Alliance (UMNO)
N23	Ulu Trengganu Timor	Abdul Rahman Kassim	Alliance (UMNO)
N24	Ulu Trengganu Barat	Mahmood Sulaiman	Alliance (UMNO)

== Penang ==
No.	State Constituency	Member	Party
Alliance 18 | UDP 4 | Socialist Front 2
N01	Butterworth	Williams David	Alliance (MIC)
N02	Bagan Ajam	Phee Joo Teik	Alliance (MCA)
N03	Permatang Pauh	Ariffin Shariff	Alliance (UMNO)
N04	Bukit Mertajam	Wong Pow Nee	Alliance (MCA)
N05	Alma	Sulaiman Ahmad	Alliance (UMNO)
N06	Sungei Bakap	Kee Yong Chin	Alliance (MCA)
N07	Nibong Tebal	Sahid Hassan	Alliance (UMNO)
N08	Kelawei	Tan Kim Hoe	Alliance (MCA)
N09	Doby Ghaut	M. S. A. Zachariah	Alliance (UMNO)
N10	Tanjong Bungah	Cheah Seng Khim	Alliance (MCA)
N11	Ayer Itam	Lim Kean Siew from 6 November 1965	Socialist Front (Lab)
N11	Ayer Itam	Chor Sin Kheng until 1965	Alliance (MCA)
N12	Jelutong	Tan Phock Kin	Socialist Front (Lab)
N13	Glugor	Aziz Ibrahim	Alliance (UMNO)
N14	Balik Pulau	Ahmad Md Taib	Alliance (UMNO)
N15	Bayan Lepas	Ismail Hashim	Alliance (UMNO)
N16	Kota	Lim Chong Eu	UDP
N17	Tanjong Tengah	Teh Geok Kooi	UDP
N18	Tanjong Utara	Khoo Kay Por	UDP
N19	Tanjong Barat	Teh Ewe Lim	UDP
N20	Sungei Pinang	D. S. Ramanathan	Alliance (MIC)
N21	Tanjong Selatan	Khor Beng Seah	Socialist Front (Lab)
N22	Muda	Ismail Chik	Alliance (UMNO)
N23	Kepala Batas	Ahmad Abdullah	Alliance (UMNO)
N24	Tasek Glugor	Ahmad Jamil	Alliance (UMNO)

== Perak ==
No.	State Constituency	Member	Party
Alliance 35 | PPP 5
N01	Grik	Md Nor Md Dahan	Alliance (UMNO)
N02	Lenggong	Ahmad Said	Alliance (UMNO)
N03	Parit Buntar	Halimah Abdul Raof	Alliance (UMNO)
N04	Kuala Kurau	Samsudin Ahmad	Alliance (UMNO)
N05	Bagan Serai	Masud Untoi	Alliance (UMNO)
N06	Gunong Semanggol	Ahmad Yusof	Alliance (UMNO)
N07	Larut	Kamaruddin Mohamed Isa	Alliance (UMNO)
N08	Selama	Hussein Yaacob	Alliance (UMNO)
N09	Matang	Wan Othman Wan Omar	Alliance (UMNO)
N10	Taiping	Goh Chok Sam	Alliance (MCA)
N11	Ayer Tawar	Ng Kuok Thai	Alliance (MCA)
N12	Pengkalan Bharu	Ishak Mohamed	Alliance (UMNO)
N13	Lekir	Wong Ting Seng	Alliance (MCA)
N14	Lumut	Liew Whye Hone	Alliance (MCA)
N15	Karai	Mohamed Ali Zaini Mohamed Zain	Alliance (UMNO)
N16	Jalong	See Khoon Lim	Alliance (MCA)
N17	Senggang	Mohd. Kassim M. Din	Alliance (UMNO)
N18	Padang Rengas	Abdullah Raof	Alliance (UMNO)
N19	Blanja	Ahmad Alias Md Alias	Alliance (UMNO)
N20	Kampong Gajah	Saudi Zakaria	Alliance (UMNO)
N21	Sungei Raia	Yeap Kheng Yam	Alliance (MCA)
N22	Chemor	Ng Sin Yoon	Alliance (MCA)
N23	Pekan Lama	D. R. Seenivasagam	PPP
N24	Pekan Bharu	Chan Swee Ho	PPP
N25	Pasir Puteh	Fong Kuan See	PPP
N26	Kuala Pari	S. P. Seenivasagam	PPP
N27	Pusing	Khong Kok Yat	PPP
N28	Tanjong Tualang	Cheong Kai Choong	Alliance (MCA)
N29	Gopeng	Choy Chooi Yooi	Alliance (MCA)
N30	Kuala Dipang	Oh Kay Seng	Alliance (MCA)
N31	Sungei Manik	Yahya Shubban Harun	Alliance (UMNO)
N32	Bandar	Ahmad Razali Mohamed	Alliance (UMNO)
N33	Pasir Bedamar	Saw Beng Kuan	Alliance (MCA)
N34	Batak Rabit	Som Abdullah	Alliance (UMNO)
N35	Rungkup	Loppe Hashim Ketong	Alliance (UMNO)
N36	Hutan Melintang	Mohd. Abas Ahmad	Alliance (UMNO)
N37	Tapah Road	Mohamed Jumah Mat Satir	Alliance (UMNO)
N38	Tapah	Hor Seng	Alliance (MCA)
N39	Bidor	V. P. Pillai	Alliance (MIC)
N40	Slim	Zakaria A. Manaf	Alliance (UMNO)

== Pahang ==
No.	State Constituency	Member	Party
Alliance 24
N01	Cameron Highlands	Chong Kat Nee	Alliance (MCA)
N02	Dong	Che Yeop Sendiri Hussin	Alliance (UMNO)
N03	Bandar Raub	Ng Keat Ling	Alliance (MCA)
N04	Tras	Sulaiman Sabudin	Alliance (UMNO)
N05	Sabai	Abu Bakar Ahmad	Alliance (UMNO)
N06	Bandar Bentong	Chow Seng Tong	Alliance (MCA)
N07	Benus	Chow Teck Noe	Alliance (MCA)
N08	Mentekab	Syed Abdullah Syed Ali	Alliance (UMNO)
N09	Tanah Puteh	Chan Kwang Chek	Alliance (MCA)
N10	Telok Sisek	Mahimon Harun	Alliance (UMNO)
N11	Beserah	Abdul Aziz Ahmad	Alliance (UMNO)
N12	Ulu Kuantan	Zainuddin Ahmad	Alliance (UMNO)
N13	Kuala Pahang	Muhammad Jusoh	Alliance (UMNO)
N14	Pahang Tua	M. Mokhtar M. Daud	Alliance (UMNO)
N15	Rompin	Ibrahim Arshad	Alliance (UMNO)
N16	Chenor	Salehuddin A. Pekan	Alliance (UMNO)
N17	Triang	Lum Wah Kum @ Lum Ban Kee	Alliance (MCA)
N18	Kuala Semantan	Awang Ngah Tok Muda Ibrahim	Alliance (UMNO)
N19	Jenderak	Mohamed Yusoff Long	Alliance (UMNO)
N20	Sanggang	Yahya Mohd Seth	Alliance (UMNO)
N21	Jelai	Abu Samah Idris from 26 September 1964	Alliance (UMNO)
N21	Jelai	Muhammad Nor Sulaiman until 24 August 1964	Alliance (UMNO)
N22	Kuala Lipis	Ong Seong Seung	Alliance (MCA)
N23	Tanjong Besar	Mohamed Khairuddin Mohamed Kawi	Alliance (UMNO)
N24	Jerantut	Abdullah Mohamed Akil	Alliance (UMNO)

== Selangor ==
No.	State Constituency	Member	Party
Alliance 24 | Socialist Front 4
N01	Tanjong Karang	Hashim Mahmood	Alliance (UMNO)
N02	Kuala Selangor Pekan	N. S. Maniam	Alliance (MIC)
N03	Kepong	Tan Chee Khoon	Socialist Front (Lab)
N04	Penchala	Lim Jew Siang	Alliance (MCA)
N05	Jeram	Hussain Abdullah	Alliance (UMNO)
N06	Sementa	Lee Eng Teh	Alliance (MCA)
N07	Serendah	Lim Cy Howe	Alliance (MCA)
N08	Kuang	Oon Seng Lee	Alliance (MCA)
N09	Kajang	Mohamed Nazir Abdul Jalil	Alliance (UMNO)
N10	Semenyih	Zainuddin Mohd Sidin	Alliance (UMNO)
N11	Ampang	Muhyeeddin Mohamed Zakaria	Alliance (UMNO)
N12	Sentul	P. T. Arasu	Alliance (MIC)
N13	Pantai	V. David	Socialist Front (Lab)
N14	Salak	Woo Hon Kong	Socialist Front (Lab)
N15	Bukit Nanas	Loong Foong Beng	Alliance (MCA)
N16	Kampong Bharu	Razali Mohamed Ali from 7 January 1967	Alliance (UMNO)
N16	Kampong Bharu	Abdullah Yassin until 1967	Alliance (UMNO)
N17	Serdang	Thuan Paik Phok from 28 December 1968	Alliance (MCA)
N17	Serdang	Chin Kek Kum until 1 November 1968	Socialist Front (Ra'ayat)
N18	Bukit Raja	Murugesu Sundram	Alliance (MIC)
N19	Port Swettenham	Raja Zulkifli Raja Borhan	Alliance (UMNO)
N20	Kampong Jawa	Cheong Jin Hoe	Alliance (MCA)
N21	Telok Datoh	Hormat Rafei	Alliance (UMNO)
N22	Morib	Harun Idris	Alliance (UMNO)
N23	Dengkil	Raja Nong Chik Raja Ishak	Alliance (UMNO)
N24	Sungei Rawang	Ng Kim Chuan	Alliance (MCA)
N25	Sabak	Lope Salleh Long @ Zainal Abidin	Alliance (UMNO)
N26	Sungei Besar	Taiban Hassan	Alliance (UMNO)
N27	Ulu Bernam	Shoib Ahmad	Alliance (UMNO)
N28	Kuala Kubu	Wong Swee Soon	Alliance (MCA)

== Negri Sembilan ==
No.	State Constituency	Member	Party
Alliance 23 | DAP 1
N01	Sri Menanti	Abdul Samad Idris	Alliance (UMNO)
N02	Johol	Sapiah Talib	Alliance (UMNO)
N03	Ulu Muar	Abdul Kadir Abdullah	Alliance (UMNO)
N04	Pilah	Ariffin Ali	Alliance (UMNO)
N05	Rantau	Ayakannu Vallisamy	Alliance (MIC)
N06	Sungei Ujong	Lam Teck Choon	Alliance (MCA)
N07	Rahang	Chen Man Hin from 11 December 1965	IND
N07	Rahang	Chen Man Hin from 11 December 1965	DAP
N07	Rahang	Han Hiu Fong until 1965	Alliance (MCA)
N08	Terentang	Siti Rahmah Kassim	Alliance (UMNO)
N09	Kota	Mohd. Yusof Abdullah	Alliance (UMNO)
N10	Tampin	Mohamad Taha Talib	Alliance (UMNO)
N11	Gemas	Lim Heng Seng	Alliance (MCA)
N12	Jimah	Cheah Yen Kwee	Alliance (MCA)
N13	Lukut	Lee Tee Siong	Alliance (MCA)
N14	Si Rusa	Awaludin Ahmad	Alliance (UMNO)
N15	Pasir Panjang	Sulaiman Ja'alam	Alliance (UMNO)
N16	Linggi	Mohamed Said Muhammad	Alliance (UMNO)
N17	Kuala Klawang	Lim Kim Kee	Alliance (MCA)
N18	Pertang	Aminuddin Abdul Manap	Alliance (UMNO)
N19	Bahau	Thong Hiang Kim	Alliance (MCA)
N20	Rompin	Tham Kin Sung	Alliance (MCA)
N21	Jempol	Mohd. Khatib Mohd. Nor	Alliance (UMNO)
N22	Lenggeng	Zainal Abidin Mohd Lati	Alliance (UMNO)
N23	Labu	Ahmad Abd. Manap	Alliance (UMNO)
N24	Bukit Nanas	Woo Thong	Alliance (MCA)

== Malacca ==
No.	State Constituency	Member	Party
Alliance 18 | Socialist Front 2
N01	Tanjong Kling	Abdul Ghafar Baba	Alliance (UMNO)
N02	Bukit Rambai	Hassan Mansor	Alliance (UMNO)
N03	Batu Berendam	Mohamed Abdul Rahman	Alliance (UMNO)
N04	Semabok	Hashim Pit	Alliance (UMNO)
N05	Kandang	Abdul Hadi Abas	Alliance (UMNO)
N06	Kota Selatan	Koh Kay Cham	Socialist Front (Lab)
N07	Kota Tengah	Chung Cheng Wen	Socialist Front (Lab)
N08	Kota Barat	Yoong Yong Pow	Alliance (MCA)
N09	Kota Utara	Tan Cheng Swee	Alliance (MCA)
N10	Kota Timor	John Leon d'Cruz	Alliance (MIC)
N11	Sungei Bahru	Abdullah Samad from 19 March 1966	Alliance (UMNO)
N11	Sungei Bahru	Tamby Chik Abdul Karim until 1966	Alliance (UMNO)
N12	Ramuan China	Abdul Ghani Ali	Alliance (UMNO)
N13	Masjid Tanah	Hassan Ya'akub	Alliance (UMNO)
N14	Alor Gajah	Talib Karim	Alliance (UMNO)
N15	Pulau Sebang	Yeow Kay	Alliance (MCA)
N16	Batang Malacca	Ahmad Joned	Alliance (UMNO)
N17	Rim	Tan Nai Kwi	Alliance (MCA)
N18	Jasin	Noordin Sa'ad	Alliance (UMNO)
N19	Serkam	Abdul Ghani Ahmad	Alliance (UMNO)
N20	Sungei Rambai	Ibrahim Abdul Hamid	Alliance (UMNO)

== Johore ==
No.	State Constituency	Member	Party
Alliance 32
N01	Bukit Serampang	Abdul Rahman Mahmud from 7 September 1968	Alliance (UMNO)
N01	Bukit Serampang	Hassan Yunus until 1968	Alliance (UMNO)
N02	Jorak	Othman Saat	Alliance (UMNO)
N03	Labis	Teo Ah Kiang @ Chiang Kee Foon	Alliance (MCA)
N04	Bekok	Sim Kim Chong @ Siew Ah See	Alliance (MCA)
N05	Bandar Maharani	Chua Song Lim	Alliance (MCA)
N06	Parit Bakar	Kosai Mohamed Salleh	Alliance (UMNO)
N07	Simpang Kiri	Othman Taib	Alliance (UMNO)
N08	Parit Jawa	Che Sairan Sabtu	Alliance (UMNO)
N09	Broleh	Mohd Salleh Tahir	Alliance (UMNO)
N10	Bandar Penggaram	Tan Peng Khoon	Alliance (MCA)
N11	Tanjong Sembrong	Mohamed Noor Juma'at	Alliance (UMNO)
N12	Ayer Hitam	Yusa Nawawi	Alliance (UMNO)
N13	Gunong Lambak	Siew Theng Yhoi	Alliance (MCA)
N14	Sri Lalang	Loh Fook Yen	Alliance (MCA)
N15	Kota Tinggi	Tan Seng Toon	Alliance (MCA)
N16	Johore Lama	Ismail Sa'adon	Alliance (UMNO)
N17	Rengit	Jalok Mailbok	Alliance (UMNO)
N18	Benut	Bachok @ Abdul Majid Hashim	Alliance (UMNO)
N19	Pontian Dalam	Abdullah Sudin	Alliance (UMNO)
N20	Pontian Kechil	Syed Ibrahim Hussein	Alliance (UMNO)
N21	Rengam	Ismail Hassan	Alliance (UMNO)
N22	Senai-Kulai	H. L. Tang	Alliance (MCA)
N23	Plentong	Hasnah Ahmad	Alliance (UMNO)
N24	Tanjong Petri	Ooyub Abdul Manas	Alliance (UMNO)
N25	Glang Patah	Syed Mohamed Edros	Alliance (UMNO)
N26	Tampoi	Elias Udin from 30 September 1967	Alliance (UMNO)
N26	Tampoi	Daud Ahmad until 1967	Alliance (UMNO)
N27	Endau	Ali Raya	Alliance (UMNO)
N28	Mersing	Poh Swee Lim	Alliance (MCA)
N29	Batu Anam	M. P. Kumaran	Alliance (MIC)
N30	Bandar Segamat	Tay Sia Ba	Alliance (MCA)
N31	Tangkak	Lai Kuen Tee	Alliance (MCA)
N32	Serom	Ngah Abdul Rahman	Alliance (UMNO)

== Singapore ==
=== 1963–1965 ===
No.	State Constituency	Member	Party
PAP 37 | BS 13 | UPP 1
N01	Aljunied	Suppiah Visva Lingam	PAP
N02	Anson	Perumal Govindasamy	PAP
N03	Bras Basah	Ho See Beng	PAP
N04	Bukit Merah	Lim Huan Boon	BS
N05	Bukit Panjang	Ong Lian Teng	BS
N06	Bukit Timah	Lee Tee Tong	BS
N07	Cairnhill	Lim Kim San	PAP
N08	Changi	Sim Boon Woo	PAP
N09	Choa Chu Kang	Chio Cheng Thun	BS
N10	Crawford	S. Thendayatha Bani	BS
N11	Delta	Chan Choy Siong	PAP
N12	Farrer Park	S. R. Dharmarajoo	PAP
N13	Geylang East	Hoo Cheng Choon	PAP
N14	Geylang Serai	Rahmat Kenap	PAP
N15	Geylang West	Yong Nyuk Lin	PAP
N16	Havelock	Loh Miaw Gong	BS
N17	Hong Lim	Ong Eng Guan	UPP
N18	Jalan Besar	Chan Chee Seng	PAP
N19	Jalan Kayu	Tan Cheng Tong	BS
N20	Joo Chiat	Fong Kim Heng	PAP
N21	Jurong	Chia Thye Poh	BS
N22	Kallang	Buang Omar Junid	PAP
N23	Kampong Glam	Rajaratnam Sinnathamby	PAP
N24	Kampong Kapor	Mahmud Awang	PAP
N25	Kampong Kembangan	Mohamed Ariff Suradi	PAP
N26	Kreta Ayer	Goh Keng Swee	PAP
N27	Moulmein	Dhanam Avadai	PAP
N28	Mountbatten	Ng Yeow Chong	PAP
N29	Nee Soon	Chan Sun Wing	BS
N30	Pasir Panjang	Othman Wok	PAP
N31	Paya Lebar	Kow Kee Seng	BS
N32	Punggol	Ng Kah Ting	PAP
N33	Queenstown	Jek Yeun Thong	PAP
N34	River Valley	Lim Cheng Lock	PAP
N35	Rochore	Toh Chin Chye	PAP
N36	Sembawang	Teong Eng Siong	PAP
N37	Sepoy Lines	Wee Toon Boon	PAP
N38	Serangoon Gardens	Raphael Alfred Gonzales	PAP
N39	Siglap	Abdul Rahim Ishak	PAP
N40	Southern Islands	Yaacob Mohamed	PAP
N41	Stamford	Andrew Fong Sip Chee	PAP
N42	Tampines	Poh Ber Liak	BS
N43	Tanglin	Edmund William Barker	PAP
N44	Tanjong Pagar	Lee Kuan Yew	PAP
N45	Telok Ayer	Ong Pang Boon	PAP
N46	Telok Blangah	Bernard Rodrigues	PAP
N47	Thomson	Koo Young	BS
N48	Tiong Bahru	Lee Teck Him	PAP
N49	Toa Payoh	Wong Soon Fong	BS
N50	Ulu Pandan	Chow Chiok Hock	PAP
N51	Upper Serangoon	Sia Kah Hui	PAP

== Sabah ==
=== 1967–1971 ===
No.	State Constituency	Member	Party
USNO 14 | UPKO 12 | SCA 5 | IND 1
N01	Kudat	Wong Lok Khian	Sabah Alliance (SCA)
N02	Bengkoka-Banggi	Mustapha Harun	Sabah Alliance (USNO)
N03	Langkon	Andrew Matakin	UPKO
N04	Tandek	Herman Luping	UPKO
N05	Usukan	Mohamed Said Keruak	Sabah Alliance (USNO)
N06	Sorob	Ismail Gimbad	UPKO
N07	Sulaman	Indan Kari	Sabah Alliance (USNO)
N08	Kiulu	Payar Juman	UPKO
N09	Jesselton Bandar	Pang Tet Tshung	Sabah Alliance (SCA)
N10	Tanjong Aru	Lee Vui Min	Sabah Alliance (SCA)
N11	Moyog	Peter Joinud Mojuntin	UPKO
N12	Papar	Jumah Salim	Sabah Alliance (USNO)
N13	Bongawan	Mulkiaman Sherzeman	Sabah Alliance (USNO)
N14	Kuala Penyu	Wong Fook Siang	UPKO
N15	Labuan	Abdullah Anson	Sabah Alliance (USNO)
N16	Beaufort	Mohammed Dun Banir	Sabah Alliance (USNO)
N17	Tenom	Tingkalor Lampag	UPKO
N18	Sipitang-Ulu Padas	Harris Salleh	Sabah Alliance (USNO)
N19	Keningau	Anthony Undan Andulag	UPKO
N20	Pensiangan-Sook	Stephen Koroh	UPKO
N21	Ranau	Mohamed Yassin Hashim from 12 June 1968	Sabah Alliance (USNO)
N21	Ranau	Abdul Ghani Gilong until 1968	UPKO
N22	Tambunan	Anthony Gibon	UPKO
N23	Sandakan Bandar	Khoo Siak Chiew	Sabah Alliance (SCA)
N24	Elopura	Yap Pak Leong	IND
N25	Sugut	Kang Ka Wang Kulang	Sabah Alliance (USNO)
N26	Labuk	Jimmy Malis	UPKO
N27	Kuala Kinabatangan	Aliuddin Harun	Sabah Alliance (USNO)
N28	Lamag	Pengiran Gaipam Pengiran Indar	Sabah Alliance (USNO)
N29	Lahad Datu	Salleh Sulong	Sabah Alliance (USNO)
N30	Semporna	Sakaran Dandai	Sabah Alliance (USNO)
N31	Merotai	Mohamed Kassim Kamidin	Sabah Alliance (USNO)
N32	Balung	Edwin Chan Foo Sang	Sabah Alliance (SCA)
