= 1971 Sabah state election =

State election in Sabah, Malaysia

- Not contested

All 32 seats in the Sabah State Legislative Assembly 17 seats needed for a majority
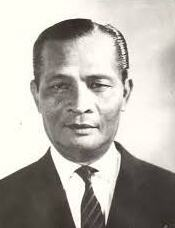

	Majority party	Minority party
Leader	Mustapha Harun	Peter Lo Sui Yin
Party	USNO	SCA
Alliance	Alliance (federal); Sabah Alliance (state)	Sabah Alliance (state)
Leader since	1961
Leader's seat	Bengkoka-Banggi	Not contesting
Last election	14 seats	5
Seats won	28	4
Seat change	▲14	▼1
Chief Minister before election
Mustapha Harun
USNO
Elected Chief Minister
Mustapha Harun
USNO

The 1971 Sabah state election was to be held in October 1971, after the State Assembly was dissolved on 20 September 1971. This was the second state election to take place.

After nominations closed on 5 October 1971, Sabah Alliance which consists of United Sabah National Organisation (USNO) and Sabah Chinese Association (SCA), won all the seats uncontested. All the opposition nomination papers were rejected, or no nominations were sent at all.

== Results ==
Party	Seats	+/–
United Sabah National Organisation	28	+14
Sabah Chinese Association	4	–1
Total	32	0

No.	State Constituency	Member	Party
USNO 28 | SCA 4
N01	Kudat	Abdul Salam Harun	Alliance (USNO)
N02	Bengkoka-Banggi	Mustapha Harun	Alliance (USNO)
N03	Langkon	Idrus Mustakim	Alliance (USNO)
N04	Tandek	Majuning Majun @ Mohd Omar	Alliance (USNO)
N05	Usukan	Mohammad Said Keruak	Alliance (USNO)
N06	Sorob	Ismail Gimbad	Alliance (USNO)
N07	Sulaman	Dahlan Harun	Alliance (USNO)
N08	Kiulu	Payar Juman	Alliance (USNO)
N09	Jesselton Bandar	Pang Tet Tshung	Alliance (SCA)
N10	Tanjong Aru	Herman Luping	Alliance (USNO)
N11	Moyog	Peter Joinud Mojuntin	Alliance (USNO)
N12	Papar	Salleh Ibrahim	Alliance (USNO)
N13	Bongawan	Aliudin Harun	Alliance (USNO)
N14	Kuala Penyu	Fadzil Wong Fook Siang	Alliance (USNO)
N15	Labuan	Harris Salleh	Alliance (USNO)
N16	Beaufort	Mohd Dun Banir	Alliance (USNO)
N17	Tenom	Tingkalor Lampang	Alliance (USNO)
N18	Sipitang-Ulu Padas	Mohamed Yassin Hashim	Alliance (USNO)
N19	Keningau	Anthony Undan Andulag	Alliance (USNO)
N20	Pensiangan-Sook	Stephen Koroh	Alliance (USNO)
N21	Ranau	Abdul Ghani Ahmad	Alliance (USNO)
N22	Tambunan	Anthony Gibon	Alliance (USNO)
N23	Sandakan Bandar	Tan Tze Shu	Alliance (SCA)
N24	Elopura	Ngui Tet Min	Alliance (SCA)
N25	Sugut	Habib Abdul Rahman Habib Mahmud	Alliance (USNO)
N26	Labuk	Salleh Otik	Alliance (USNO)
N27	Kuala Kinabatangan	Salleh Sulong	Alliance (USNO)
N28	Lamag	Pg Mohd Ismail Pg Siat	Alliance (USNO)
N29	Lahad Datu	Johari Ariff	Alliance (USNO)
N30	Semporna	Sakaran Dandai	Alliance (USNO)
N31	Merotai	Mohamad Kassim Kamidin	Alliance (USNO)
N32	Balung	Edwin Chan Foo Sang	Alliance (SCA)

== Aftermath ==
Mustapha Harun, the leader of USNO & Sabah Alliance, and the Chief Minister before the election, were sworn in as Chief Minister for the second term, on 7 October.
