= Balung =

Balung (N67)
Sabah constituency

State constituency
- Legislature: Sabah State Legislative Assembly
MLA
Syed Ahmad Syed Abas
GRS
- Constituency created: 1967
- First contested: 1967
- Last contested: 2025

Demographics
- Population (2020): 70,671
- Electors (2025): 22,252

Balung is a state constituency in Sabah, Malaysia, that is represented in the Sabah State Legislative Assembly.

== Demographics ==
As of 2020, Balung has a population of 70,671 people.

Ethnic breakdown of Balung's electorate as of 2025
1. Muslim Bumiputera (88.0%)
2. Non-Muslim Bumiputera (7.00%)
3. Chinese (5.00%)
4. Other ethnicities (0.00%)

== History ==
=== Polling districts ===
According to the gazette issued on 31 October 2022, the Balung constituency has a total of 7 polling districts.

State constituency	Polling District	Code	Location
Balung (N67)	Kinabutan	190/67/01	SMK Kinabutan
Balung (N67)	Andrassy	190/67/02	SK Andrassy
Balung (N67)	Balung	190/67/03	SMK Balung
Balung (N67)	Kinabutan Besar	190/67/04	SMK Jalan Apas
Balung (N67)	Bukit Quoin	190/67/05	SK Bukit Quoin
Balung (N67)	Ranggau	190/67/06	SK Ranggau

=== Representation history ===
Member of Sabah State Legislative Assembly for Balung
Assembly	No	Years	Member	Party
Constituency created
3rd	N32	1969–1971	Edwin Chan Foo Sang (曾富生)	Alliance (SCA)
4th	N32	1971–1976	Edwin Chan Foo Sang (曾富生)	Alliance (SCA)
5th	N47	1976–1979	Abu Bakar Titingan	Alliance (USNO)
5th	N47	1979–1981	Syed Abas Syed Ali	BN (BERJAYA)
6th	N47	1981	Syed Abas Syed Ali	BN (BERJAYA)
6th	N47	1981–1985	Ahmad Bahrom Abu Bakar Titingan	BN (BERJAYA)
7th	N47	1985–1986	Ahmad Bahrom Abu Bakar Titingan	BN (BERJAYA)
7th	N47	1986	Ahmad Bahrom Abu Bakar Titingan	PBS
8th	N47	1986–1990	Ahmad Bahrom Abu Bakar Titingan	PBS
9th	N47	1990	Ismail Jook	USNO
9th	N47	1990–1994	Ismail Jook	BN (UMNO)
10th	N47	1994–1999	Abdul Manan Jakasa	BN (UMNO)
11th	N45	1999–2004	Abdul Manan Jakasa	BN (UMNO)
12th	N55	2004–2008	Syed Abas Syed Ali	BN (UMNO)
13th	N55	2008–2013	Syed Abas Syed Ali	BN (UMNO)
14th	N55	2013–2018	Syed Abas Syed Ali	BN (UMNO)
15th	N55	2018	Osman Jamal	BN (UMNO)
15th	N55	2018–2020	Osman Jamal	WARISAN
15th	N55	2020	Osman Jamal	Independent
16th	N67	2020–2023	Hamild @ Hamid Awang	BN (UMNO)
16th	N67	2023–2025	Hamild @ Hamid Awang	GRS (GAGASAN)
17th	N67	2025–present	Syed Ahmad Syed Abas	GRS (GAGASAN)

== Election results ==
Sabah state election, 2025: Balung
Party	Candidate	Votes	%	∆%
GRS	Syed Ahmad Syed Abas	4,717	35.86	▲35.86
Heritage	Ahmad Frank Salazar @ Franco	3,372	25.64	▼10.78
PN	Munizer Mahamaud	2,265	17.22	▲17.22
BN	Erwan Palateh	1,688	12.83	▼30.76
Homeland Solidarity Party	Chee Kheng Moi	373	2.84	▲2.84
Independent	Shafie Hassan	218	1.66	▲1.66
Sabah Clan Party	Norazizah Pelari @ Palari	154	1.17	▲1.17
Independent	Hartono Muhamad Juno	144	1.09	▲1.09
Sabah Dream Party	Ugis Pula	87	0.66	▲0.66
Sabah People's Unity Party	Rosdiansa Mohd Noor	78	0.59	▲0.59
PBK	Ahmad Awang	57	0.43	▲0.43
Total valid votes		13,153		
Total rejected ballots		232		
Unreturned ballots		15		
Turnout		13,400	60.22	▲4.85
Registered electors		22,252		
Majority		1,345	10.22	▲3.05
GRS gain from BN		Swing		-
Source(s) "RESULTS OF CONTESTED ELECTION AND STATEMENTS OF THE POLL AFTER THE OFFICIAL ADDITION OF VOTES" (PDF).

Sabah state election, 2020: Balung
Party	Candidate	Votes	%	∆%
BN	Hamild @ Hamid Awang	3,524	43.59	▼2.22
Sabah Heritage Party	Andi Rus Diana Andi Paladjareng	2,944	36.42	▼7.75
Sabah People's Hope Party	Ariffin Kasim Ibong	1,213	15.00	▲12.82
Love Sabah Party	Abdul Hamid Damang	110	1.36	▲1.36
LDP	Cyril Aloysius	67	0.83	▲0.83
USNO (Baru)	Labosa @ Ghazali Jakikan	33	0.41	▼0.71
GAGASAN	Abu Bakar Jambuan	26	0.32	▲0.32
Total valid votes		7,917	97.93	
Total rejected ballots		133	1.65	
Unreturned ballots		34	0.42	
Turnout		8,084	55.37	▼29.56
Registered electors		14,600		
Majority		580	7.17	▲5.53
BN hold		Swing		
Source(s) "RESULTS OF CONTESTED ELECTION AND STATEMENTS OF THE POLL AFTER THE OFFICIAL ADDITION OF VOTES".

Sabah state election, 2018: Balung
Party	Candidate	Votes	%	∆%
BN	Osman Jamal	4,887	45.81	▼27.52
Sabah Heritage Party	Andi Rus Diana Andi Paladjareng	4,713	44.17	▲44.17
PAS	Amboase Romano	428	4.01	▲4.01
Sabah People's Hope Party	Razali Hamzah	233	2.18	▲2.18
USNO (Baru)	Alipa Jackery	119	1.12	▲1.12
Total valid votes		10,380	97.29	
Total rejected ballots		252	2.36	
Unreturned ballots		37	0.35	
Turnout		10,669	84.93	▲5.85
Registered electors		14,541		
Majority		174	1.64	▼50.43
BN hold		Swing		
Source(s) "RESULTS OF CONTESTED ELECTION AND STATEMENTS OF THE POLL AFTER THE OFFICIAL ADDITION OF VOTES".

Sabah state election, 2013: Balung
Party	Candidate	Votes	%	∆%
BN	Syed Abas Syed Ali	7,843	73.33	▼2.79
PKR	Frank Salazar @ Franco	2,274	21.26	▲0.27
SAPP	Abdul Hamid	200	1.87	▲1.87
Independent	Mohd Abdillah Timbasal	180	1.68	▲1.68
Total valid votes		10,497	98.14	
Total rejected ballots		195	1.82	
Unreturned ballots		4	0.04	
Turnout		10,696	79.08	▲12.93
Registered electors		13,526		
Majority		5,569	52.07	▼3.06
BN hold		Swing		
Source(s) "KEPUTUSAN PILIHAN RAYA UMUM DEWAN UNDANGAN NEGERI". Archived from the original on 2022-10-15.

Sabah state election, 2008: Balung
Party	Candidate	Votes	%	∆%
BN	Syed Abas Syed Ali	5,160	76.12	▼9.35
PKR	Mohd Abdillah Timbasal	1,423	20.99	▲15.88
Total valid votes		6,593	97.11	
Total rejected ballots		188	2.77	
Unreturned ballots		8	0.12	
Turnout		6,779	66.15	▲6.96
Registered electors		10,248		
Majority		3,737	55.13	▼24.26
BN hold		Swing		
Source(s) "KEPUTUSAN PILIHAN RAYA UMUM DEWAN UNDANGAN NEGERI SABAH BAGI TAHUN 2008".

Sabah state election, 2004: Balung
Party	Candidate	Votes	%	∆%
BN	Syed Abas Syed Ali	5,019	85.47	▲40.18
SETIA	Perdes Nelson	357	6.08	▲6.08
PKR	Amir Manap	300	5.11	▲5.11
PAS	Ahmad Awang	131	2.23	▲2.23
Total valid votes		5,807	98.89	
Total rejected ballots		62	1.06	
Unreturned ballots		3	0.05	
Turnout		5,872	59.19	▼5.94
Registered electors		9,921		
Majority		4,662	79.39	▲61.86
BN hold		Swing		
Source(s) "KEPUTUSAN PILIHAN RAYA UMUM DEWAN UNDANGAN NEGERI SABAH BAGI TAHUN 2004".

Sabah state election, 1999: Balung
Party	Candidate	Votes	%	∆%
BN	Abdul Manan Jakasa	4,787	45.29	▼11.33
PBS	Wong Fook Voon	2,934	27.76	▼13.05
BERSEKUTU	Kassim Ibong	2,729	25.82	▲25.09
Total valid votes		10,450	98.86	
Total rejected ballots		120	1.14	
Unreturned ballots		0	0.00	
Turnout		10,570	65.13	▼3.09
Registered electors		16,230		
Majority		1,853	17.53	▲1.72
BN hold		Swing		
Source(s) "KEPUTUSAN PILIHAN RAYA UMUM DEWAN UNDANGAN NEGERI SABAH BAGI TAHUN 1999".

Sabah state election, 1994: Balung
Party	Candidate	Votes	%	∆%
BN	Abdul Manan Jakasa	7,370	56.62	▲2.71
PBS	Sari Suhut	5,312	40.81	▼2.65
BERSEKUTU	Lung Wing Sang	95	0.73	▲0.73
PAS	Ahmad Awang @ Madon	79	0.61	▲0.61
Independent	Ismail Juma	35	0.27	▲0.27
Total valid votes		12,891	99.04	
Total rejected ballots		125	0.96	
Unreturned ballots		0	0.00	
Turnout		13,016	68.22	▼4.70
Registered electors		19,079		
Majority		2,058	15.81	▲15.36
BN hold		Swing		
Source(s) "KEPUTUSAN PILIHAN RAYA UMUM DEWAN UNDANGAN NEGERI SABAH BAGI TAHUN 1994".

Sabah state election, 1990: Balung
Party	Candidate	Votes	%	∆%
USNO	Ismail Jook	4,892	43.91	▲5.75
PBS	Ahmad Bahrom Abu Bakar Titingan	4,841	43.46	▼6.10
BERJAYA	Light Nanis	807	7.24	▼3.44
LDP	Liew Chiew Chai	214	1.92	▲1.92
PRS	Tandek Sedah	95	0.85	▲0.85
Total valid votes		10,450	98.86	
Total rejected ballots		291	1.14	
Unreturned ballots		0	0.00	
Turnout		11,140	72.92	▼0.64
Registered electors		15,276		
Majority		51	0.45	▼10.95
USNO gain from PBS		Swing		?
Source(s) "KEPUTUSAN PILIHAN RAYA UMUM DEWAN UNDANGAN NEGERI SABAH BAGI TAHUN 1990".

Sabah state election, 1986: Balung
Party	Candidate	Votes	%	∆%
PBS	Ahmad Bahrom Abu Bakar Titingan	4,099	49.56	▲19.51
USNO	Ahmad Awang @ Madon	3,156	38.16	▲6.93
BERJAYA	Lo Ah Su @ Lo Soo On	883	10.68	▼26.30
SCCP	Chan Tze Hung Stephen	61	0.74	▲0.74
Total valid votes		8,199	99.13	
Total rejected ballots		72	0.87	
Unreturned ballots		0	0.00	
Turnout		8,271	73.56	▼0.65
Registered electors		11,244		
Majority		943	11.40	▲5.65
PBS gain from BN		Swing		?
Source(s) "KEPUTUSAN PILIHAN RAYA UMUM DEWAN UNDANGAN NEGERI SABAH BAGI TAHUN 1986".

Sabah state election, 1985: Balung
Party	Candidate	Votes	%	∆%
BERJAYA	Ahmad Bahrom Abu Bakar Titingan	2,417	36.98	▼15.78
USNO	Pengiran Hashim Pengiran Ibrahim	2,041	31.23	▼2.54
PBS	Geoffrey Yee Lung Fook	1,964	30.05	▲30.05
BERSEPADU	Ahmad Benjamin	114	1.74	▲1.74
Total valid votes		6,536	98.85	
Total rejected ballots		76	1.55	
Unreturned ballots		0	0.00	
Turnout		6,612	74.21	▼2.76
Registered electors		8,910		
Majority		376	5.75	▼13.24
BERJAYA hold		Swing		
Source(s) "How they fared". New Straits Times. 1985-04-22.

Sabah state election, 1981: Balung
Party	Candidate	Votes	%	∆%
BERJAYA	Syed Abas Syed Ali	2,440	52.76	▼4.30
USNO	Pengiran Hashim Pengiran Ibrahim	1,562	33.77	▼17.77
PAS	Michael S. Malanjun	113	2.44	▲2.44
DAP	Liew Kong Khai	501	10.83	▲10.83
PUSAKA	Ismail Juma	9	0.19	▲0.19
Total valid votes		4,625	98.44	
Total rejected ballots		73	1.55	
Unreturned ballots		0	0.00	
Turnout		4,698	76.97	▼4.10
Registered electors		6,104		
Majority		878	18.99	▲15.092
BERJAYA hold		Swing		
Source(s) "Sabah election: How they fared". New Straits Times. 1981-03-29.

Sabah state election, 1976: Balung
Party	Candidate	Votes	%	∆%
USNO	Abu Bakar Titingan	1,626	51.54	
BERJAYA	Stephen Chan Tze Hung	1,529	48.46	
Total valid votes		3,155		
Total rejected ballots		65		
Unreturned ballots		0		
Turnout		3,220	81.07	
Registered electors		3,972		
Majority		97	3.07	
USNO gain from SCA		Swing		?

Sabah state election, 1971: Balung
Party	Candidate	Votes	%	∆%
On the nomination day, Edwin Chan Foo Sang won uncontested.
SCA	Edwin Chan Foo Sang			
Total valid votes				
Total rejected ballots				
Unreturned ballots				
Turnout				
Registered electors				
Majority				
SCA hold		Swing		?

Sabah state election, 1967: Balung
Party	Candidate	Votes	%
SCA	Edwin Chan Foo Sang	2,232	53.63
Independent	Stephen Chan Tze Hung	994	23.88
Independent	Tai Yau Khiun	648	15.57
Independent	Ampong Kerahu	148	3.56
Independent	Richard Lee	127	3.05
Independent	Robert Cheng	13	0.31
Total valid votes		4,162	
Total rejected ballots		110	
Unreturned ballots		0	
Turnout		4,272	84.18
Registered electors		5,075	
Majority		1,238	29.75
This was a new seat created.
