= Tambunan (state constituency) =

Constituency in Malaysia

Tambunan (N39)
Sabah constituency

State constituency
- Legislature: Sabah State Legislative Assembly
MLA
Jeffrey Kitingan
Homeland Solidarity Party
- Constituency created: 1967
- First contested: 1967
- Last contested: 2025

Demographics
- Electors (2025): 29,187

Tambunan is a state constituency in Sabah, Malaysia, that is represented in the Sabah State Legislative Assembly.

== Demographics ==
As of 2020, Tambunan has a population of 32,007 people.

Ethnic breakdown of Tambunan's electorate as of 2025
1. Non-Muslim Bumiputera (85.0%)
2. Muslim Bumiputera (14.0%)
3. Chinese (1.00%)
4. Other ethnicities (0.00%)

== History ==
=== Polling districts ===
According to the gazette issued on 31 October 2022, the Tambunan constituency has a total of 16 polling districts.

State constituency	Polling Districts	Code	Location
Tambunan（N39）	Kirokot	180/39/01	SK Kirokot
Tambunan（N39）	Patau	180/39/02	SK Patau
Tambunan（N39）	Kinabaan	180/39/03	SMK Tambunan
Tambunan（N39）	Sunsuron	180/39/04	SK Sunsuron
Tambunan（N39）	Timbou	180/39/05	SK Timbou
Tambunan（N39）	Toboh	180/39/06	SK St David Toboh
Tambunan（N39）	Kaingaran	180/39/07	SK Kaingaran
Tambunan（N39）	Tambunan Bandar	180/39/08	SK Pekan Tambunan; SMA Negeri Pekan Tambunan
Tambunan（N39）	Lubong	180/39/09	SK Nambayan
Tambunan（N39）	Nambayan	180/39/10	SK Monsok Tengah
Tambunan（N39）	Kuala Monsok	180/39/11	SK Lotong
Tambunan（N39）	Garas	180/39/12	SK Garas
Tambunan（N39）	Tiong	180/39/13	SK Tiong Widu
Tambunan（N39）	Namadan	180/39/14	SK Kuala Namadan Tambunan
Tambunan（N39）	Monsorulong	180/39/15	SK Kinaluan
Tambunan（N39）	Rompon	180/39/16	SK Rompon

=== Representation history ===
Member of Sabah State Legislative Assembly for Tambunan
Assembly	No	Years	Member	Party
Constituency created
3rd	N22	1967 – 1971	Anthony Gibon	UPKO
4th	N22	1971 – 1976	Gunsanad Samson Sundang	Alliance (USNO)
5th	N18	1976	Joseph Pairin Kitingan	BERJAYA
5th	N18	1976 – 1981	Joseph Pairin Kitingan	BN (BERJAYA)
6th	N18	1981 – 1984	Joseph Pairin Kitingan	BN (BERJAYA)
6th	N18	1984 – 1985	Joseph Pairin Kitingan	Independent
7th	N24	1985 – 1986	Joseph Pairin Kitingan	PBS
8th	N24	1986 – 1990	Joseph Pairin Kitingan	PBS
9th	N24	1990 – 1994	Joseph Pairin Kitingan	GR (PBS)
10th	N24	1994 – 1999	Joseph Pairin Kitingan	GR (PBS)
11th	N27	1999 – 2002	Joseph Pairin Kitingan	PBS
11th	N27	2002 – 2004	Joseph Pairin Kitingan	BN (PBS)
12th	N32	2004 – 2008	Joseph Pairin Kitingan	BN (PBS)
13th	N32	2008 – 2013	Joseph Pairin Kitingan	BN (PBS)
14th	N32	2013 – 2018	Joseph Pairin Kitingan	BN (PBS)
15th	N32	2018 – 2020	Jeffrey Kitingan	STAR
15th	N32	2020	Jeffrey Kitingan	PN (STAR)
16th	N39	2020–2025	Jeffrey Kitingan	GRS (STAR)
16th	N39	2025	Jeffrey Kitingan	STAR
17th	N39	2025–present	Jeffrey Kitingan	STAR

== Election results ==
Sabah state election, 2025
Party	Candidate	Votes	%	∆%
Homeland Solidarity Party	Jeffrey Kitingan	12,595	65.79	▲65.79
GRS	Victor P Paut	5,284	27.60	▲27.60
Heritage	Bianus Kontong	738	3.85	▲3.85
KDM	Jikol Tagua	242	1.26	▲1.26
Sabah Native Cooperation Party	Dionysia Ginsos	151	0.79	▲0.79
Sabah Peace Party	Gulit Rukang	68	0.36	▲0.36
Sabah Dream Party	Kenneth Edwin	66	0.34	▲0.34
Total valid votes		19,144		
Total rejected ballots		144		
Unreturned ballots		20		
Turnout		19,308	66.15	▼4.81
Registered electors		29,187		
Majority		7,311	38.19	▼19.77
Homeland Solidarity Party gain from PN		Swing		?
Source(s) "RESULTS OF CONTESTED ELECTION AND STATEMENTS OF THE POLL AFTER THE OFFICIAL ADDITION OF VOTES" (PDF).

Sabah state election, 2020
Party	Candidate	Votes	%	∆%
PN	Jeffrey Kitingan	8,691	74.17	▲28.11
UPKO	Laurentius Nayan Ambu	1,899	16.21	▲16.21
PBS	Sliverius Bruno	439	3.75	▲3.75
Love Sabah Party	Damian Marcus Podtung	326	2.78	▼0.64
GAGASAN	Nordin Jaini	140	1.19	▲1.19
Independent	Jimy Palikat	60	0.51	▲0.51
Total valid votes		11,555	98.62	
Total rejected ballots		107	0.91	
Unreturned ballots		55	0.46	
Turnout		11,717	70.96	▼11.00
Registered electors		16,511		
Majority		6,792	57.96	▲50.18
PN hold		Swing		
Source(s) "RESULTS OF CONTESTED ELECTION AND STATEMENTS OF THE POLL AFTER THE OFFICIAL ADDITION OF VOTES".

Sabah state election, 2018
Party	Candidate	Votes	%	∆%
STAR	Jeffrey Kitingan	6,136	46.06	▲16.09
BN	Joseph Pairin Kitingan	5,099	38.28	▼9.45
Sabah Heritage Party	Justin Alip	1,427	10.71	▲10.71
Love Sabah Party	Nestor Joannes	456	3.42	▲3.42
Total valid votes		13,118	98.47	
Total rejected ballots		118	0.89	
Unreturned ballots		86	0.65	
Turnout		13,322	81.96	▼3.11
Registered electors		16,255		
Majority		1,037	7.78	▼9.98
STAR gain from BN		Swing		?
Source(s) "RESULTS OF CONTESTED ELECTION AND STATEMENTS OF THE POLL AFTER THE OFFICIAL ADDITION OF VOTES".

Sabah state election, 2013
Party	Candidate	Votes	%	∆%
BN	Joseph Pairin Kitingan	5,586	47.73	▼16.69
STAR	Nestor Joannes	3,507	29.97	▲29.97
PKR	Wilfred Win Ponil	1,744	14.90	▼17.54
Independent	Justin Yonsoding	591	5.05	▲5.05
Independent	Francis Koh Kui Tze	63	0.54	▼1.27
Total valid votes		11,491	98.19	
Total rejected ballots		192	1.64	
Unreturned ballots		20	0.17	
Turnout		11,703	85.07	▲7.76
Registered electors		13,757		
Majority		2,079	17.76	▼14.22
BN hold		Swing		
Source(s) "KEPUTUSAN PILIHAN RAYA UMUM DEWAN UNDANGAN NEGERI".

Sabah state election, 2008
Party	Candidate	Votes	%	∆%
BN	Joseph Pairin Kitingan	5,601	64.42	▼7.11
PKR	Moses @ Mozes Michael Iking	2,820	32.44	▲32.44
Independent	Francis Koh Kui Tze	157	1.81	▲1.81
Total valid votes		8,578	98.67	
Total rejected ballots		116	1.33	
Unreturned ballots		0	0.00	
Turnout		8,694	77.31	▲6.83
Registered electors		11,245		
Majority		2,781	31.98	▼12.31
BN hold		Swing		
Source(s) "KEPUTUSAN PILIHAN RAYA UMUM DEWAN UNDANGAN NEGERI SABAH BAGI TAHUN 2008".

Sabah state election, 2004
Party	Candidate	Votes	%	∆%
BN	Joseph Pairin Kitingan	5,297	71.53	▲48.83
Independent	Nestor Joannes	2,017	27.24	▲27.24
Total valid votes		7,314	98.77	
Total rejected ballots		81	1.09	
Unreturned ballots		10	0.14	
Turnout		7,405	70.48	▼21.95
Registered electors		10,506		
Majority		3,280	44.29	▼5.86
BN gain from PBS		Swing		?
Source(s) "KEPUTUSAN PILIHAN RAYA UMUM DEWAN UNDANGAN NEGERI SABAH BAGI TAHUN 2004".

Sabah state election, 1999
Party	Candidate	Votes	%	∆%
PBS	Joseph Pairin Kitingan	6,791	72.85	▼4.62
BN	Petrus Gurinting	2,116	22.70	▲14.63
BERSEKUTU	Joseph Ajun	169	1.81	▲1.81
SETIA	Juili Matimbun	141	1.51	▲1.51
Total valid votes		9,217	98.87	
Total rejected ballots		105	1.13	
Unreturned ballots		0	0.00	
Turnout		9,322	92.43	▲6.00
Registered electors		10,086		
Majority		4,675	50.15	▼30.68
PBS hold		Swing		
Source(s) "KEPUTUSAN PILIHAN RAYA UMUM DEWAN UNDANGAN NEGERI SABAH BAGI TAHUN 1999".

Sabah state election, 1994
Party	Candidate	Votes	%	∆%
PBS	Joseph Pairin Kitingan	6,265	88.90	▼1.11
BN	Martin Yong	569	8.07	▲4.17
Independent	Joseph Ajun	169	2.40	▲2.40
Total valid votes		7,003	99.38	
Total rejected ballots		44	0.62	
Unreturned ballots		0	0.00	
Turnout		7,047	86.43	▲1.75
Registered electors		8,153		
Majority		5,696	80.83	▼5.28
PBS hold		Swing		
Source(s) "KEPUTUSAN PILIHAN RAYA UMUM DEWAN UNDANGAN NEGERI SABAH BAGI TAHUN 1994".

Sabah state election, 1990
Party	Candidate	Votes	%	∆%
PBS	Joseph Pairin Kitingan	5,516	90.01	▲3.84
USNO	Aling Amon	239	3.90	▼5.15
AKAR	Juanis Yajuni Als Joannnes Aju	145	2.37	▲2.37
PRS	Joseph Ajun	96	1.57	▲1.57
BERJAYA	Norbert @ Zakaria Angkangon	62	1.01	▼2.96
Independent	Edmund Otigil	6	0.10	▲0.10
Total valid votes		6,064	98.96	
Total rejected ballots		64	1.04	
Unreturned ballots		0	0.00	
Turnout		6,128	84.68	▲3.27
Registered electors		7,237		
Majority		5,277	86.11	▲8.99
PBS hold		Swing		
Source(s) "KEPUTUSAN PILIHAN RAYA UMUM DEWAN UNDANGAN NEGERI SABAH BAGI TAHUN 1990".

Sabah state election, 1986
Party	Candidate	Votes	%	∆%
PBS	Joseph Pairin Kitingan	4,752	86.17	▲0.31
USNO	Bernard Wong Chung Ngin	499	9.05	▲9.05
BERJAYA	Albertus Ongkudon	219	3.97	▼8.94
Total valid votes		5,470	99.18	
Total rejected ballots		45	0.82	
Unreturned ballots		0	0.00	
Turnout		5,515	81.41	▲1.68
Registered electors		6,774		
Majority		4,253	77.12	▲4.17
PBS hold		Swing		
Source(s) "KEPUTUSAN PILIHAN RAYA UMUM DEWAN UNDANGAN NEGERI SABAH BAGI TAHUN 1986".

Sabah state election, 1985
Party	Candidate	Votes	%	∆%
PBS	Joseph Pairin Kitingan	4,104	85.86	▲85.86
BERJAYA	Martin M. Idang	617	12.91	▼1.83
BERSEPADU	Gabriel Igil	59	1.23	▲1.23
Total valid votes		4,780	100.00	
Total rejected ballots		92		
Unreturned ballots		0		
Turnout		4,872	79.73	▲5.75
Registered electors		6,111		
Majority		3,487	72.95	▲2.43
PBS gain from Independent		Swing		-

Sabah state by-election, 29 December 1984 Sought re-election upon change of party allegiance of the incumbent, Joseph Pairin Kitingan
Party	Candidate	Votes	%	∆%
Independent	Joseph Pairin Kitingan	3,685	85.26	▲84.64
BERJAYA	Roger Ongkili	637	14.74	▼65.01
Total valid votes		4,322	100.00	
Total rejected ballots		152		
Unreturned ballots		0		
Turnout		4,474	73.97	▼6.20
Registered electors		6,048		
Majority		3,048	70.52	▲10.40
Independent gain from BERJAYA		Swing		-

Sabah state election, 1981
Party	Candidate	Votes	%	∆%
BERJAYA	Joseph Pairin Kitingan	3,336	79.75	▲13.88
PASOK	Petrus Francis Guriting	821	19.63	▲19.63
Independent	Bernard Wong Chung Ngin	26	0.62	▲0.62
Total valid votes		4,183	100.00	
Total rejected ballots		111		
Unreturned ballots		0		
Turnout		4,294	80.17	▼5.22
Registered electors		5,356		
Majority		2,515	60.12	▲28.39
BERJAYA hold		Swing		

Sabah state election, 1976
Party	Candidate	Votes	%	∆%
BERJAYA	Joseph Pairin Kitingan	2,310	65.87	
USNO	Ambrose Angkangon	1,197	34.13	
Total valid votes		3,507	100.00	
Total rejected ballots		192		
Unreturned ballots		0		
Turnout		3,699	85.39	
Registered electors		4,332		
Majority		1,113	31.74	
BERJAYA gain from USNO		Swing		-

Sabah state election, 1971
Party	Candidate	Votes	%	∆%
On the nomination day, Anthony Gibon won uncontested.
USNO	Anthony Gibon			
Total valid votes				
Total rejected ballots				
Unreturned ballots				
Turnout				
Registered electors		0		
Majority				
USNO gain from UPKO		Swing		-

Sabah state election, 1967
Party	Candidate	Votes	%
UPKO	Anthony Gibon	2,901	83.4
Independent	Primus	493	14.19
Independent	Joseph Marcus Podtung	69	1.99
Independent	Ng Ah Kiew	7	0.20
Independent	Ong Shih Chang	5	0.14
Total valid votes		3,475	100.00
Total rejected ballots		111	
Unreturned ballots		0	
Turnout		3,586	91.55
Registered electors		3,917	
Majority		2,408	69.29
This was a new constituency created
