= 1976 Sabah state election =

State election in Sabah, Malaysia

- 5–14 April 1976

All 48 seats in the Sabah State Legislative Assembly 25 seats needed for a majority
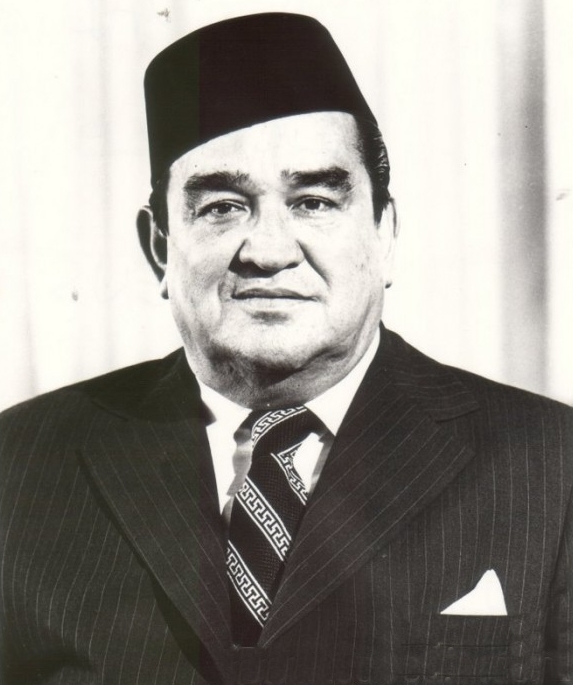

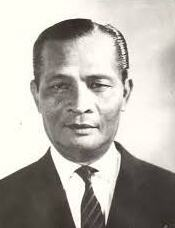
	Majority party	Minority party
Leader	Fuad Stephens	Mustapha Harun
Party	BERJAYA	USNO
Alliance	Barisan Nasional (federal)	Barisan Nasional (federal); Sabah Alliance (state)
Leader since	1975	1961
Leader's seat	Kiulu	Banggi
Last election	New party	29 seats
Seats won	28	20
Seat change	▲28	▼9
Popular vote	101,213	70,157
Percentage	53.86%	37.33%
Chief Minister before election
Said Keruak
USNO
Elected Chief Minister
Fuad Stephens
BERJAYA

The 1976 Sabah state election was held between Monday, 5 April and Saturday, 14 April 1976. This was the third state election to take place, and the first to feature opposition candidates since the first election on 1967, as the second state election on 1971 has all government candidates won uncontested. The state assembly were dissolved on 23 January 1976, and the nomination day was on 18 March 1976.

In the election, Parti Bersatu Rakyat Jelata Sabah (BERJAYA) led by Fuad Stephens, won the election with a majority of 28 seats out of 48 seats in the newly expanded state assembly, and ousted incumbent government United Sabah National Organisation (USNO) from power. USNO, who is in coalition with Sabah Chinese Association (SCA) that governs the state for the past 9 years, only won 20 seats while SCA lost all their seats.

== Background and contesting parties ==
BERJAYA was registered only less than a year earlier in July 1975, when some USNO members, dissatisfied with the party's direction under leadership of Mustapha Harun, chose to exit the party and form a new party. BERJAYA applied and successfully joined Barisan Nasional after its registration. They would be later joined by then-Yang di-Pertua Negeri of Sabah, Fuad Stephens, who resigned from his position to lead the new party as its president.

Mustapha himself in October 1975 has resigned from his position of Sabah's Chief Minister, a position he had held since USNO won the first state election, though he remained party leader. His deputy, Said Keruak, replaced him and was Chief Minister heading into the 1976 election. USNO also had convincing wins against BERJAYA candidates in two December 1975 state by-elections, in Kuala Kinabatangan and Labuan.

SCA, which was in the Sabah Alliance together with USNO, led by Michael Liaw, also contested in this election. Among other parties contesting were the United Sabah People's Organization, led by Richard E. Lee and Joe Manjaji, as well as the Peninsula-based Malaysian Social Justice Party (PEKEMAS).

Days before nomination day, BERJAYA suffered two setbacks when its secretary-general Mohammad Noor Mansor was detained under Internal Security Act, which made him unable to contest the election with the party nominating his father as the replacement candidate, and, Ghani Gilong, then a federal minister and one of the founders of BERJAYA party as well as its vice president, announced that he was leaving BERJAYA to return to USNO, his former party.

At the time of the assembly's dissolution, out of 32 elected and 6 nominated members of the legislative assembly, Sabah Alliance held 34 seats, BERJAYA three seats and an independent held one.

== Results ==
Party	Votes	%	Seats	+/–
Sabah People's United Front	101,213	53.86	28	New
United Sabah National Organisation	70,157	37.33	20	–9
Sabah Chinese Association	12,075	6.43	0	–3
Malaysian Social Justice Party	2,864	1.52	0	0
United Sabah People's Organisation	83	0.04	0	0
Independents	1,527	0.81	0	0
Total	187,919	100.00	48	+16
Valid votes	187,919	97.42		
Invalid/blank votes	4,983	2.58		
Total votes	192,902	100.00		
Registered voters/turnout	239,008	80.71		
Source: Tindak Malaysia Github

== Aftermath ==
After BERJAYA's win in the election, Fuad was sworn in as the new Chief Minister. But Fuad's tenure was short-lived that lasted only for 44 days, as he and several of his cabinet ministers died in the helicopter crash on 6 June the same year. Harris Salleh, his deputy, would replace him as Chief Minister.

In April 1978, Mustapha announced his resignation as president of USNO for health reasons and was replaced by his deputy, Said Keruak.
