= Peter Lo Su Yin =

Malaysian politician (1923–2020)

Yang Berbahagia Tan Sri Datuk Peter Lo Su Yin PSM PGDK JMN PPM
- 罗思仁

2nd Chief Minister of Sabah
- In office 1 January 1965 – 12 May 1967
- Governor: Mustapha Harun; Pengiran Ahmad Raffae
- Preceded by: Fuad Stephens
- Succeeded by: Mustapha Harun

Personal details
- Born: 19 May 1923 Sandakan, North Borneo (now Sabah, Malaysia)
- Died: 1 January 2020 (aged 96) Kota Kinabalu, Sabah, Malaysia
- Citizenship: Malaysian
- Party: Sabah Chinese Association
- Spouse: Rosie Dorothy Funk (died 2002)
- Children: 4 (one son, three daughters)
- Education: Victoria University of Wellington

Tan Sri Datuk Peter Lo Su Yin (Chinese: 羅思仁; 19 May 1923 – 1 January 2020) was Chief Minister of Sabah from January 1965 to May 1967. He was a member of the Sabah Chinese Association (SCA).

== Biography ==
Peter Lo Su Yin was born to ethnic Chinese settlers on 19 May 1923 in Sandakan, Sabah. He first attended St. Mary's School in Sandakan and after that St. Anthony's Boys School in Singapore. Having won a scholarship through the Colombo Plan in 1952 to study Law at the Victoria University of Wellington in Wellington, New Zealand, in 1955 he received his Bachelor of Law degree. In 1956 he was admitted to the Bar, thus becoming the first Sabahan to graduate in law and qualify as a lawyer.

On returning to Sabah (or Crown Colony of North Borneo as it was known then), he worked for the Singapore law firm Donaldson & Burkinshaw in Sandakan between 1957 and 1961. At the same time, in 1958, he took a position with the Sandakan Town Board and was soon promoted to the senior post of Deputy Chairman, which he held until 1961. He left Donaldson & Burkinshaw in 1961 to set up his own law practice; Peter Lo & Co, the first Sabah law firm to be opened by a local Sabahan and which to this day still exists as a practising law firm.

At the same time, in 1961-62, he was appointed as a deputy in the Legislative Assembly of North Borneo and as such, also a member of the Sabah Public Services Commission. It was around this time that the concept of a new nation comprising Malaya, Singapore and the Bornean states of Sabah and Sarawak was being put forward. Later during the negotiation stage Lo was appointed by the British government as a member of the Inter-Governmental Committee to sit in 2 sub-committees: the Constitutional sub-committee and the Judicial and Legal Sub-committee, whose remit was to define the terms and conditions by which Sabah would combine with the other nations to form the new nation of Malaysia, and to ensure its rights and interests in this new entity would be safeguarded and protected.

It was during these negotiations that the now famous and sometimes controversial document known as the "20-point agreement" was first drafted. Lo, representing Sabah's interests and with his background in law, was a key player in these talks and integral not just in coming up with the set of demands and conditions by which Sabah's rights would be protected following a merger with the other nations, but was responsible also for drafting this important piece of legislation. The new nation of Malaysia was formed on 16 September 1963.

At the same time, Lo was busy preparing for a political career in the post-independence era and so set about forming a political party with Khoo Siak Chiew called The United Party. This party later merged with the Democratic Party to become the Borneo Utara National Party (BUNAP) which subsequently changed its name to Sabah National Party (SANAP) when the Crown Colony of North Borneo was renamed Sabah in 1963. In 1965 SANAP merged with The Sabah Chinese Association (SCA) and the new party became the SCA. Lo was President of the SCA when he became Chief Minister.

Lo served as a Member of Parliament for the new Malaysia from 1963 to 1978. In 1964 he was appointed Minister without portfolio to serve in the Federal Cabinet under the then Prime Minister, Tunku Abdul Rahman, the first Sabahan to hold this privilege. Then in late 1964, following a collapse in the Sabah coalition government due to tension between the 2 leading parties UPKO (United Pasok Momogon Kadazan Organisation) and USNO (United Sabah National Organisation), Lo was appointed Chief Minister of Sabah when the incumbent Chief Minister, Donald Stephens resigned.

Lo took up this position on 1 January 1965, becoming the first Chinese Chief Minister of Sabah and to hold this post. He was in charge during arguably one of the most difficult and turbulent times in Malaysia's history, having to ensure harmony in a new multi-racial nation, whilst also juggling often conflicting demands between the Federal, British and Sabah governments. It was also during Lo's tenure, only months into his position as Chief Minister, that saw the withdrawal of Singapore from Malaysia to become an independent nation in 1965, a landmark event in both Malaysia and Singapore’s history. Lo lost his seat in the State elections in 1967 and was replaced as Chief Minister by Mustapha Harun. He continued to serve as a Member of Parliament until 1978 after which he returned to focus on his legal career.

Lo died on 1 January 2020 in KPJ Sabah Specialist Hospital, Kota Kinabalu, Sabah, Malaysia at the age of 96. He was married to Rosie Dorothy Funk (deceased 2002) and left behind 4 children- Jenny, Cynthia, Bonaventure, Jacqueline - and son-in-law, Michael. His eldest daughter became BBC editor-cum-producer in London, the second daughter became a senior officer with a bank in Sabah, the youngest daughter became a chartered accountant in London while his son became a lawyer in Singapore.

== Awards and honours ==
Lo was awarded the Panglima Setia Mahkota (PSM) which carries the title 'Tan Sri' by the King in 1996. Before that, in 1972 he was awarded the Panglima Gemilang Darjah Kinabalu (PGDK), a state honour carrying the title 'Datuk'. On 12 May 2007, Lo was awarded the Unity Award from the Yang di-Pertuan Agong.

=== Honour of Malaysia ===
- Malaysia
  - Recipient of the Malaysian Commemorative Medal (Gold) (PPM) (1965)
  - Companion of the Order of the Defender of the Realm (JMN) (1993)
  - Commander of the Order of Loyalty to the Crown of Malaysia (PSM) – Tan Sri (1996)
- Sabah
  - Commander of the Order of Kinabalu (PGDK) – Datuk (1972)

Political offices
Preceded by Fuad Stephens	Chief Minister of Sabah; 1965–1967	Succeeded by Mustapha Harun
