= Harris Salleh =

Malaysian politician (born 1930)

Yang Berbahagia Tan Sri Dato' Harris Mohd Salleh PMN SPMJ SJMK SPMS SSAP DA
- حارث محمّد صالح

6th Chief Minister of Sabah
- In office 6 June 1976 – 22 April 1985
- Governor: Mohd Hamdan Abdullah; Ahmad Koroh; Mohamad Adnan Robert
- Deputy: James Peter Ongkili (1976-1983)
- Preceded by: Fuad Stephens
- Succeeded by: Joseph Pairin Kitingan

Personal details
- Born: Harris bin Mohd Salleh; 4 November 1930 (age 95) Crown Colony of Labuan (now Labuan, Malaysia)
- Party: USNO (–1975); BERJAYA (1975–1991); UMNO (1991–1998); BERSEKUTU (1998–2010)
- Spouse: Rupiah Bachee Khan

Tan Sri Dato' Harris bin Mohd Salleh (born 4 November 1930) is a Malaysian politician who served as the 6th Chief Minister of Sabah from June 1976 to April 1985. During his tenure, he ceded the island of Labuan, which used to be part of the state of Sabah, to the federal Government, making it the second federal territory of Malaysia. He was also the founding President of the Sabah People's United Front (BERJAYA).

== Election results ==
Sabah State Legislative Assembly
Year	Constituency	Candidate	Votes	Pct	Opponent(s)	Votes	Pct	Ballots cast	Majority	Turnout
1967	N18 Sipitang-Ulu Padas	Harris Salleh (USNO)	2,686	63.05%	Sadum Agong (UPKO)	1,574	36.95%	4,354	1,112	88.91%
1971	N15 Labuan	Harris Salleh (USNO)	Unopposed							
1976	N43 Tenom	Harris Salleh (BERJAYA)	2,292	74.05%	Yong Peck Fong (SCA)	763	24.65%	3,176	1,529	82.67%
1976	N43 Tenom	Harris Salleh (BERJAYA)	2,292	74.05%	Bijun Ginandah (IND)	40	1.29%	3,176	1,529	82.67%
1981	N43 Tenom	Harris Salleh (BN)	2,988	75.84%	Gamparon Lajah (PASOK)	861	21.85%	4,036	2,127	77.85%
1981	N43 Tenom	Harris Salleh (BN)	2,988	75.84%	Awang Yahya (USNO)	51	1.29%	4,036	2,127	77.85%
1981	N43 Tenom	Harris Salleh (BN)	2,988	75.84%	Yong Yung Lee (IND)	40	1.02%	4,036	2,127	77.85%
1985	N39 Tenom	Harris Salleh (BN)	1,727	35.88%	Kadoh Agundong (PBS)	2,622	54.48%	4,858	895	78.56%
1985	N39 Tenom	Harris Salleh (BN)	1,727	35.88%	Leong Chau Chu (USNO)	427	8.87%	4,858	895	78.56%
1985	N39 Tenom	Harris Salleh (BN)	1,727	35.88%	Arajai Mantias (BERSEPADU)	37	0.77%	4,858	895	78.56%
1990	N38 Sipitang	Harris Salleh (BERJAYA)	969	15.41%	Jawawi Isa (PBS)	2,437	38.77%	6,361	276	82.24%
1990	N38 Sipitang	Harris Salleh (BERJAYA)	969	15.41%	Yusof Yacob (USNO)	2,161	34.38%	6,361	276	82.24%
1990	N38 Sipitang	Harris Salleh (BERJAYA)	969	15.41%	Othman Mohamad Yassin (IND)	597	9.49%	6,361	276	82.24%
1990	N38 Sipitang	Harris Salleh (BERJAYA)	969	15.41%	Pius Ganang (AKAR)	86	1.36%	6,361	276	82.24%
1990	N38 Sipitang	Harris Salleh (BERJAYA)	969	15.41%	Ramlah Rammelan (PRS)	35	0.55%	6,361	276	82.24%

Parliament of Malaysia
Year	Constituency	Candidate	Votes	Pct	Opponent(s)	Votes	Pct	Ballots cast	Majority	Turnout
1978	P129 Ulu Padas	Harris Salleh (BN)	Unopposed							
1982	P129 Ulu Padas	Harris Salleh (BN)	8,252	72.81%	Halik Zaman (IND)	2,486	21.93%	11,595	5,766	73.22%
1982	P129 Ulu Padas	Harris Salleh (BN)	8,252	72.81%	Jamparon Laja (PAS)	425	3.75%	11,595	5,766	73.22%
1982	P129 Ulu Padas	Harris Salleh (BN)	8,252	72.81%	Lawrence Liki (IND)	171	1.51%	11,595	5,766	73.22%

== Honours ==
=== Honours of Malaysia ===
- Malaysia
  - Commander of the Order of the Defender of the Realm (PMN) – Tan Sri (2011)
- Johor
  - Knight Grand Commander of the Order of the Crown of Johor (SPMJ) – Dato' (1980)
- Kelantan
  - Knight Grand Commander of the Order of the Life of the Crown of Kelantan (SJMK) – Dato' (1984)
- Pahang
  - Grand Knight of the Order of Sultan Ahmad Shah of Pahang (SSAP) – Dato' Sri (1981)
- Sabah
  - Grand Commander of the Order of Kinabalu (SPDK) – Datuk Seri Panglima (1968, returned 1986)
- Sarawak
  - Knight Commander of the Order of the Star of Hornbill Sarawak (DA) – Datuk Amar (1980)
- Selangor
  - Knight Grand Commander of the Order of the Crown of Selangor (SPMS) – Dato' Seri (1980)

Political offices
Preceded by Fuad Stephens	Chief Minister of Sabah; 1976–1985	Succeeded by Joseph Pairin Kitingan
