= Sabah Chinese Association =

- Malay name: Persatuan Cina Sabah ڤرساتوان چينا سابه
- Chinese name: 沙巴華人公會 沙巴华人公会; Shābā huárén gōnghuì
- Abbreviation: SCA
- Founders: Khoo Siak Chiew, Peter Chin
- Founded: October 1962
- Merger of: United Party and Democratic Party
- Headquarters: Kota Kinabalu, Sabah
- National affiliation: Sabah Alliance (1962–1976); Barisan Nasional (1973–1975)

The Sabah Chinese Association (Malay: Persatuan Cina Sabah, SCA) was a Chinese political party in the North Borneo and the Sabah state of Malaysia.

== History ==
The party was established in October 1962 as the Borneo Utara National Party, a merger of the United Party and the Democratic Party after encouragement from the Malayan Chinese Association. Both parties had been founded earlier in the year; the United Party by Khoo Siak Chew in Sandakan and the Democratic Party by Peter Chin in Jesselton. It was later renamed the Sabah National Party, before becoming the Sabah Chinese Association in 1965 when it merged with a non-political organisation by the same name.

SCA's Peter Lo Sui Yin was the second Chief Minister of Sabah from 1965 to 1967.

Following the merger, the new party contested the local elections in an alliance with the United Sabah National Organisation and the United Pasokmomogun Kadazan Organisation. It won five seats in the 1967 Sabah state election, and three seats in the 1969 Malaysian general election, and retained all three in the 1974 Malaysian general election, in which it was part of the Barisan Nasional. However, it failed to win a seat in the 1976 Sabah state election, defeated by the Sabah People's United Front in every seat it contested; following the defeat, it was later dissolved.

== Government offices ==
=== State governments ===
- Sabah (1963–1964, 1965–1967, 1967–1976)

Note: bold as Chief Minister, italic as junior partner

== Election results ==
=== General elections ===
Election	Leader	Votes	%	Seats	Status
1964	Peter Lo Sui Yin	Appointed by Legislative Assembly		4 / 159	Governing coalition
1969	Peter Lo Sui Yin	24,699	1.03	3 / 144	Governing coalition
1974	Peter Lo Sui Yin			3 / 154	Governing coalition

=== State elections ===
Sabah State Legislative Assembly
Election	Votes		Seats			Position (Note: As part of electoral coalition.)	Status
Election	Count	%	Result	Won / contested	+/–	Position	Status
1967	14,924	9.4	5 / 32	5 / 6	▲5	▲1st (Sabah Alliance) (Note: Some seats were contested on its own against other Alliance members)	Alliance
1971	walkover (Note: Entirely won on walkover, no vote was conducted.)		4 / 32	4 / 4	▼1	▲1st (Sabah Alliance)	Alliance
1976	12,075	6.4	0 / 48	0 / 8	▼4	▼2nd (Sabah Alliance)	No seats
