= 1967 Sabah state election =

State election in Sabah, Malaysia

- 8–23 April 1967

All 32 seats in the Sabah State Legislative Assembly 17 seats needed for a majority
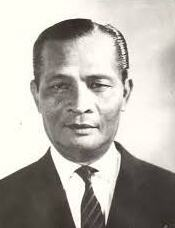

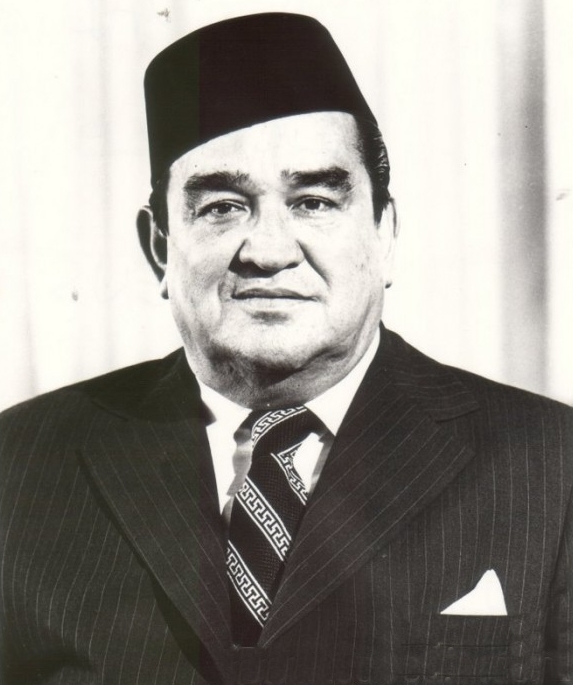

	Majority party	Minority party	Third party
Leader	Mustapha Harun	Donald Stephens	Peter Lo Sui Yin
Party	USNO	UPKO	SCA
Alliance	Alliance (federal); Sabah Alliance (state)	Alliance (federal)	Sabah Alliance (state)
Leader's seat	Bengkoka-Banggi	Not contesting	Elopura (lost)
Seats won	14	12	5
Popular vote	64638	64767	14924
Percentage	40.75	40.83	9.41
Chief Minister before election
Peter Lo Sui Yin
SCA
Elected Chief Minister
Mustapha Harun
USNO

The 1967 Sabah state election were held between 8 April to 23 April 1967, with nomination day on 8 March 1967. This was the first state election to take place, after Sabah independence from British and subsequently joining Malaysia in 1963.

Sabah Alliance which consists of United Sabah National Organisation (USNO) and Sabah Chinese Association (SCA), won 19 of the 32 seats and gained simple majority to form government. United Pasokmomogun Kadazan Organisation (UPKO), who are in the federal Alliance coalition with USNO and SCA but opposition at state level, won 12 seats, while 1 seat was won by an independent.

== Background ==
After Sabah independence from British rule on 16 September 1963, the state Legislative Assembly was created with appointment of local leaders, called The Legislative Executive, from various communities of Sabah, and representing the Local Council Jurisdiction.

Donald Stephens, from UPKO, was appointed the first Chief Minister of Sabah. UPKO mainly were representing the Kadazandusun community, with Stephens as its Paramount Leader. USNO, the other main party in the Assembly, were representing the Malay-Muslim community, and together with SCA and Sabah Indian Congress (SIC) created the Sabah Alliance coalition. USNO's leader Mustapha Harun was appointed as the state's first Yang di-Pertua Negeri.

Stephens relinquished his post at the end of 1964 to become the state's second federal minister, and were replaced by the Sabah's first federal minister and SCA leader Peter Lo on 1 January 1965. Mustapha meanwhile resigned from his Yang di-Pertua Negeri post on 16 September 1965, to prepare for the upcoming state election scheduled in 1967, in which he will be contesting. Stephens decided not to contest the state election, instead focusing on the federal seat in the next Malaysian general election.

National Council of Alliance Party have decided that the parties can contest on their own while sharing the same election program. As such, SCA was the only party using Alliance logo, limited on seats where UPKO did not contest against it. USNO and SCA did not contest against each other.

== Results ==
Party	Votes	%	Seats
United Sabah National Organisation	64,638	40.75	14
United Pasokmomogun Kadazan Organisation	64,767	40.83	12
Sabah Chinese Association	14,924	9.41	5
Independents	14,306	9.02	1
Total	158,635	100.00	32
Valid votes	158,635	97.72	
Invalid/blank votes	3,694	2.28	
Total votes	162,329	100.00	
Registered voters/turnout	192,448	84.35	
Source: Tindak Malaysia Github

== Aftermath ==
Mustapha, the leader of USNO & Sabah Alliance, were sworn in as Chief Minister on 11 May, along with his cabinet ministers from USNO and SCA. He replaces previous CM, Peter Lo who lost in the election. This was the start of the 9-year rule of Sabah Alliance led by USNO's Mustapha in Sabah.

UPKO council led by Stephens decided in December that year to dissolve the party, and the remaining UPKO assemblymen and members to join USNO. Stephens himself decided to retire from politics, until forming BERJAYA with several ex-USNO members in 1975.
