= Kaki Bukit (state constituency) =

Perlis, Malaysia state legislative district

Perlis constituency

Defunct state constituency
- Legislature: Perlis State Legislative Assembly
- Constituency created: 1955
- Constituency abolished: 1974
- First contested: 1959
- Last contested: 1969

Kaki Bukit was a state constituency in Perlis, Malaysia, that was represented in the Perlis State Legislative Assembly from 1955 to 1974.

The state constituency was first contested in 1955 and is mandated to return a single Assemblyman to the Perlis State Legislative Assembly under the first-past-the-post voting system.

== History ==
It was abolished in 1974 when it was redistributed.

=== Representation history ===
Members of the Legislative Assembly for Kaki Bukit
| Assembly | No | Years | Member | Party |
Constituency created
| 1st | N01 | 1959–1964 | Loh Ah Tong (罗运通) | Alliance (MCA) |
| 2nd | N01 | 1964–1969 | Loh Ah Tong (罗运通) | Alliance (MCA) |
| | | 1969–1971 | Assembly dissolved | |
| 3rd | N01 | 1971–1973 | Loh Ah Tong (罗运通) | Alliance (MCA) |
| 3rd | N01 | 1973–1974 | Loh Ah Tong (罗运通) | BN (MCA) |
Constituency abolished, split into Titi Tinggi and Chuping

== Election results ==
Perlis state election, 1969
| Party | Candidate | Votes | % | ∆% |
|---|---|---|---|---|
| Alliance | Loh Ah Tong | 2,629 | 57.69 | ▼15.61 |
| PAS | Mustaffa Ahmad | 1,539 | 33.77 | ▲7.08 |
| Parti Sosialis Rakyat Malaysia | Che Mahmud Che Man | 389 | 8.54 | ▲8.54 |
| Total valid votes | | 4,557 | 100.00 | |
| Total rejected ballots | | 334 | | |
| Unreturned ballots | | | | |
| Turnout | | 4,891 | 76.71 | |
| Registered electors | | 6,376 | | |
| Majority | | 1,090 | 23.92 | |
| Alliance hold | | Swing | | ? |

Perlis state election, 1964
| Party | Candidate | Votes | % | ∆% |
|---|---|---|---|---|
| PAS | Arifin Yusof | 1,048 | 26.69 | ▲0.01 |
| Alliance | Loh Ah Tong | 2,878 | 73.31 | ▼0.01 |
| Total valid votes | | 3,926 | 100.00 | |
| Total rejected ballots | | 199 | | |
| Unreturned ballots | | | | |
| Turnout | | 4,125 | 77.60 | |
| Registered electors | | 5,316 | | |
| Majority | | 1,830 | 46.61 | |
| Alliance hold | | Swing | | ? |

Perlis state election, 1959
| Party | Candidate | Votes | % |
|---|---|---|---|
| Alliance | Loh Ah Tong | 2,350 | 73.32 |
| PAS | Yacob Mohamed | 855 | 26.68 |
| Total valid votes | | 3,205 | 100.00 |
| Total rejected ballots | | 54 | |
| Unreturned ballots | | | |
| Turnout | | 3,259 | 84.78 |
| Registered electors | | 3,844 | |
| Majority | | 1,495 | 46.65 |
This was a new constituency created.
