= Sabah People's United Front =

Sabah People's United Front ڤرتي برساتو رعيت جلتا سابه
- Malay name: Parti Bersatu Rakyat Jelata Sabah
- Chinese name: 沙巴人民聯合陣綫 沙巴人民联合阵线; Shābā rénmín liánhé zhènxiàn
- Abbreviation: BERJAYA
- Leader: Harris Salleh
- Founded: 15 July 1975
- Dissolved: 1991
- Split from: United Sabah National Organisation
- Merged into: UMNO Sabah
- Headquarters: Sinsuran Complex; Kota Kinabalu, Sabah
- National affiliation: Barisan Nasional (1976-1986)

Party flag

Sabah People's United Front or in Malay language Parti Bersatu Rakyat Sabah is more commonly known by its abbreviation BERJAYA, was a political party based in the state of Sabah, Malaysia.

BERJAYA was formed by former United Sabah National Organisation (USNO) secretary-general Harris Salleh who was later joined by Fuad Stephens, who served as the first Chief Minister of Sabah as well as president of the United Pasokmomogun Kadazan Organisation (UPKO). Stephens became the fifth Chief Minister after BERJAYA won the 1976 state election in April but died in June the same year, being succeeded by Salleh. The party had been a partner of Barisan Nasional (BN), the then ruling coalition of Malaysia since its inception on 15 July 1975.

BERJAYA governed the state of Sabah for 9 years from 1976 to 1985 after it won the 1976 state election and ousted USNO, Fuad was installed as Sabah's fifth Chief Minister, his second time holding the post. He replaced Mohammad Said Keruak of USNO. However, barely 44 days after becoming Chief Minister, Fuad died in a plane crash in Kota Kinabalu on 6 June 1976, known as the Double Six Tragedy. Along with him, several other state ministers also perished, including Datuk Peter Joinod Mojuntin, who was the Minister of Local Government and Housing. Harris then took over his post, becoming the sixth Chief Minister of Sabah.

In the 1981 state election, BERJAYA again won, this time with an overwhelming majority. They won 44 out of 48 seats contested. In 1984, party member cum vice-president Joseph Pairin Kitingan left the party to form Parti Bersatu Sabah (PBS), as a result of being sacked due to differences with party president, Harris Salleh for he was championing the equal rights of the Kadazan-Dusun-Murut community since he claimed the latter for repeating Mustapha Harun's wrongdoings by encouraging forced conversions to Islam as well as limiting freedom of religion to non-Muslims and instilling population inequality between Muslims and non-Muslims in Sabah. This newly formed party then defeated BERJAYA in the 1985 state election.

In the 1990 state election, BERJAYA's support has evidently dwindled as they failed to win a single seat in the election and it was ousted by United Sabah Party (PBS). The party then effected a merger with USNO to form the Sabah chapter of the Peninsular-based United Malays National Organisation (UMNO). USNO's president Tun Mustapha Harun became Sabah UMNO's first president, while Harris became an adviser to the party.

== History ==
On 23 April 1975, Mustapha Harun, chief minister of Sabah from the USNO party, announced a memorandum named "The Future Position of Sabah in Malaysia", in which he argued that Sabah would be better of financially as an independent country. Malaysia's federal government decided to sponsor the formation of a new party named BERJAYA with Harris Salleh, former dissident vice-president of USNO as its founder. The federal government also persuaded Fuad Stephens, the governor of Sabah at that time, to resign from the governorship and join Harris in fighting against USNO. Both BERJAYA and USNO were within the Barisan Nasional (BN) governing coalition at the federal level but BERJAYA became the opposition at the state level, opposing USNO. The rivalry of the two parties ended in 1976 Sabah state election when BERJAYA emerged victorious against USNO.

== Government offices ==
=== State governments ===
- Sabah (1976–1985)

Note: bold as Chief Minister, italic as junior partner

== Election results ==
| Election year | Malaysia Parliament | | Outcome |
| Election year | Candidates | Seats won | Outcome |
|---|---|---|---|
| 1978 | 10 | 9 / 154 | ▲9 seats; Federal governing coalition (Barisan Nasional) |
| 1982 | 11 | 10 / 154 | ▲1 seat; Federal governing coalition (Barisan Nasional) |
| 1986 | 9 | 0 / 177 | ▼10 seats; No representation in Parliament |

=== State election results ===
Sabah State Legislative Assembly
| Election | Votes | | Seats | | | Position (Note: As part of electoral coalition.) | Status |
| Election | Count | % | Result | Won / contested | +/– | Position | Status |
|---|---|---|---|---|---|---|---|
| 1976 | 101,913 | 54.0 | 28 / 48 | 28 / 48 | ▲28 | 1st | BERJAYA (Note: BN after 1976.) |
| 1981 | 143,357 | 61.4 | 44 / 48 | 44 / 48 | ▲16 | 1st (Barisan Nasional) | BN |
| 1985 | 84,194 | 30.5 | 6 / 48 | 6 / 48 | ▼38 | ▼3rd (Barisan Nasional) | Opposition |
| 1986 | 54,121 | 17.5 | 1 / 48 | 1 / 37 | ▼5 | 3rd (Barisan Nasional) | Opposition |
| 1990 | 25,993 | 7.1 | 0 / 48 | 0 / 48 | ▼1 | ▲2nd | No seats |

== See also ==
- Category:Sabah People's United Front politicians
