= Datu Mustapha Datu Harun =

Malaysian politician

Allahyarham Tun Datuk Seri Panglima Datu Mustapha Datu Harun SMN SPDK SPMJ SPMS SPMP SPCM SIMP PNBS OBE
- داتو مصطفى داتو هارون
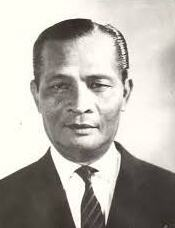

3rd Chief Minister of Sabah
- In office 12 May 1967 – 1 November 1975
- Governor: Pengiran Ahmad Raffae; Fuad Stephens; Mohd Hamdan Abdullah
- Preceded by: Peter Lo Sui Yin
- Succeeded by: Mohammad Said Keruak

1st Yang di-Pertua Negeri of Sabah
- In office 16 September 1963 – 16 September 1965
- Chief Minister: Fuad Stephens; Peter Lo Sui Yin
- Preceded by: Position Established; Sir William Goode (as Governor of North Borneo)
- Succeeded by: Pengiran Ahmad Raffae Pengiran Omar

Personal details
- Born: Datu Badiozaman Mustapha Datu Harun; 31 July 1918 Kampung Limau-Limauan, Kudat District, British North Borneo
- Died: 2 January 1995 (aged 76) Kota Kinabalu, Sabah, Malaysia
- Party: USNO (1961–1989); UMNO (1989–1994)

Datu Mustapha bin Datu Harun (31 July 1918 – 2 January 1995) was a Malaysian politician who served as the 3rd Chief Minister of Sabah from May 1967 to November 1975 and the 1st Yang Di-Pertua Negara from September 1963 to September 1965 and President of the United Sabah National Organisation (USNO). He was an important figure in Sabah and sometimes known as "Father of Independence" (Bapa Kemerdekaan) of Sabah due to his direct involvement in negotiations leading to the formation of Malaysia from 1961 to 1963. He also play an important role in Sabah early development in terms of education, economy, spread of Islam and the formation of Yayasan Sabah (Sabah Foundation).

== Personal life ==
Datu Mustapha or Datu Badiozaman (his original name) was born on 31 July 1918 at Kampung Limau-Limauan, Kudat. During his youth, he often got sick which encouraged his name to be changed from Datu Badiozaman to Datu Mustapha based on local belief that the name change can help him overcome his frequent sickness. He also had a nickname, Jaman. His father was Datu Harun bin Datu Nasaruddin and his mother was Norani Hj. Abdul Rahim. He was forth child of nine siblings-six girls and three boys: Dayang Lana, Dayang Bidari, Dayang Siti Sarah (Dayang Pindau), Datu Mustapha, Dayang Harum, Datu Muhammad, Dayang Tahiran, Datu Aliuddin and Dayang Hadjah. He shared a common lineage with Sayyid Capt. Kalingalan "Apuh Inggal" Caluang son of Caluang son of Panglima Bandahala, both tracing their ancestry back to the Sultans of Sulu. He is of mixed Suluk-Bajau origins (Bajau Bannaran/Bajau Kudat).

=== World War II ===
During World War II, he was wanted by the Japanese forces because of the rebellions he led against them, mainly in Kudat during the Japanese occupation. When they could not find him, they caught his younger brother and eventually killed him because his brother would not reveal where he was hiding. Albert Kwok invited Mustapha to join in the Jesselton Revolt, but he advised Kwok to wait and prepare, saying the time wasn't right for insurrection. However, Kwok was forced to launch the revolt ahead of schedule because the Chinese were going to be subjected to conscription by the Japanese. Kwok was able to gather the support of the islanders around the west coast of North Borneo compromising of Suluks, Bajaus and Binadans (Bajau Bannaran) under Panglima Ali and other Village Headman. The revolt was successful at first but the guerilla forces was eventually overwhelmed due to lack of support from the Allied Forces and other locals which forced Kwok and his men to surrender and executed. The Japanese then engaged in large scale massacres of indigenous civilians, including women and children while others have to watch the man of the communities executed such as the case of the islanders community like the Suluk.

== Political career ==
Mustapha founded the United Sabah National Organisation (USNO). Mustapha ruled USNO with an iron fist, together with two other ineffective partners in Sabah Alliance. It can be described that "Mustapha was USNO and USNO was Mustapha."

=== Appointment as Yang di-Pertua Negeri of Sabah ===
Mustapha was appointed the first Yang di-Pertua Negeri (head of state) for Sabah while Donald Stephens became the first chief minister of Sabah upon the formation of Malaysia, after a formal endorsement by the Sabah state legislative assembly on instruction from the Malaysian federal government.

In July 1964, USNO requested power to appoint the chief minister of Sabah after the number of seats in Sabah state legislative assembly was expanded. This request would make the position of Donald Stephens depended upon the whims of USNO. Negotiations between Stephens and Mustapha took place in Kuala Lumpur instead of Kota Kinabalu. In the end, a compromise was reached when Mustapha obtained increased USNO representations in Sabah government's cabinet while Stephens retained his chief minister post.

=== Appointment as chief minister of Sabah ===
In the 1967 state election, USNO won and Mustapha became the third Chief Minister of Sabah.

When he was Chief Minister, his relationship with the Malaysian central government was not very good. Although the central government, represented by the Barisan Nasional (BN) coalition, was a partner of USNO, they were worried about certain stances taken by Mustapha, in particular, his intention or threat to secede Sabah from Malaysia. Mustapha also refused to sign an oil agreement with the federal government which stated that only 5% of Sabah's oil revenue will be given to the state. Mustapha demanded at least 30% for the development of Sabah where it will be drilled.

Mustapha also succeeded in converting a significant number of non-Muslim indigenous people in Sabah into Islam. Aside from his involvement in politics and religion (Islam), he also made contributions in the education of Sabah. He mooted the idea of forming Sabah Foundation (Yayasan Sabah) and was responsible in setting up the first university, Universiti Kebangsaan Malaysia (UKM) Sabah Campus, and also the setting up of ITM (Institut Teknologi Mara).

He was also the Deputy President of PERKIM, when the late Tunku was the President. He was also the head of United Sabah Islamic Association (USIA) and a member of RISEAP.

In 1975, USNO secretary-general Harris Salleh left the party to form BERJAYA. This party was backed up by the federal government through the oil lobby. In the 1976 state election, BERJAYA won and Mustapha was finally ousted from power for good.

=== Formation of Sabah chapter of UMNO ===
Since his ouster in 1976, Tun Mustapha had been trying to initiate a merger of his party USNO with peninsular-based United Malays National Organisation (UMNO) in a bid to return to the corridors of power in Sabah. However, the UMNO supreme council was hesitant on a merger because their party did not accept non-Malay/non-Muslim members. Mustapha remained active in politics, leading USNO and contesting in four subsequent state elections (1981, 1985, 1986, and 1990). Although they never won again, they still managed to win several seats in the state assembly. They also remained a partner of BN at the federal government level (as opposed to the state level). After the 1990 state election, he teamed up with Harris Salleh again, after BERJAYA themselves were ousted by Parti Bersatu Sabah (PBS). This resulted in a merger of USNO and BERJAYA to create the Sabah chapter of UMNO. Mustapha became its first chief of UMNO Sabah.

== Controversies ==
=== Arrests of Roman Catholic priests, Islamisation, anti-Christian persecution and Malayisation of Sabah ===
Mustapha is remembered negatively by the Catholics of Sabah (and other Christians in general) for enforcing immigration laws to the letter by denying visa extensions to foreign priests as well as missionary pastors who had not obtained permanent residency. All the priests who objected to their expulsion for undertaking religious proselytization among the Catholics and also other Christians were eventually arrested by using his powers as Chairman of the State Security Operation Committee in his capacity as the Chief Minister of Sabah.

Under his orders, on 2 December 1972, the police made a raid at the missions at Bundu Tuhan (Ranau), Papar, Tambunan and Kuala Penyu. The raids at Tambunan and Papar were successful, timed early in the morning with the church bell ropes cut to prevent it from being used to warn the people. The priests were at Kapayan long before the parishioners were aware of it. The raid at Kuala Penyu was initially a fiasco with a reception committee of 600 Catholics. To avoid clashes, by 11 am reinforcements were flown in to arrest one priest. On 15 December, more missionary priests were arrested at Keningau, Tenom and Limbahau (Papar). The rest of the priests who only had temporary residence permits, on hearing this has no choice but to say goodbye to their parishioners and went home or were given new assignments to nearby countries. As reported in local news such as Daily Express (p. 2, 11 November 2009), the Malaysian home ministry informed in parliament that a biography of Mustapha's political opponent who died in the Double Six Crash plane crash, Datuk Peter Mojuntin, is banned. The reason was that the book "allegedly" recorded that Mojuntin exposed Mustapha's attempt to stop Catholicism in Sabah by deporting and arresting foreign missionary priests who were serving their local parishes in the state.

Peter's house was also surrounded by the police after all the priests were arrested because only he dared to voice his opposition to the prosecution of the priests. He was not arrested because of his strong political support from the Kadazan people of Penampang.

Whilst the 20-point agreement had provided that "there should be no any state religion in North Borneo", Mustapha's party of USNO including himself as well as the religious organization which he established is very active in propagating Islam and has attempted to make Islam as the official religion of the state. He actively sponsored the creation of United Sabah Islamic Association (USIA) on 14 August 1969 which was modelled from similar agencies that already existed in West Malaysia. He also actively campaigned to persuade non-Muslims to convert to Islam due to what he perceived that the unity can only be achieved through a common religion and language, where he also enforced the official use of Malay (Bahasa Malaysia) as the language of Sabah by limiting the importance of English language as well as ethnic vernacular languages and banning radio broadcasts in other vernacular languages as well as English. By February 1974, around 75,000 non-Muslim Sabahans had been converted to Islam which rapidly increase to 95,000 in 1975.

=== Aiding the Moro rebels in the southern Philippines ===
During Mustapha term as a Chief Minister of Sabah, he had a vision to make Islam as the majority religion in the state. In order to achieve his aims, he was actively harbouring Muslim refugees from the Philippines especially those of similar ethnic background to himself. Mustapha was also believed to have aiding the Moro in their struggle for independence by providing arms and training facilities in Malaysia. His action were tolerated by the Malaysian government because he was consistent in delivering Muslim votes as well as for his continuous backing of the Malaysian government. He was later successful in making Islam the main religion of Sabah. However, as Malaysian government wanted to maintain good relations between Association of Southeast Asian Nations (ASEAN) with the Philippine central government, the Malaysian government could not raise the plight of Muslim minority in the Philippines. Due to this, Mustapha planned to secede the state of Sabah from Malaysia but his intention failed after he was removed from his position in 1975. The Philippine central government then retracted the Sabah claim in 1977 as a reward for Malaysian government action to stop supporting the activities done by Southern Filipino Muslim rebels.

== Death and legacy ==
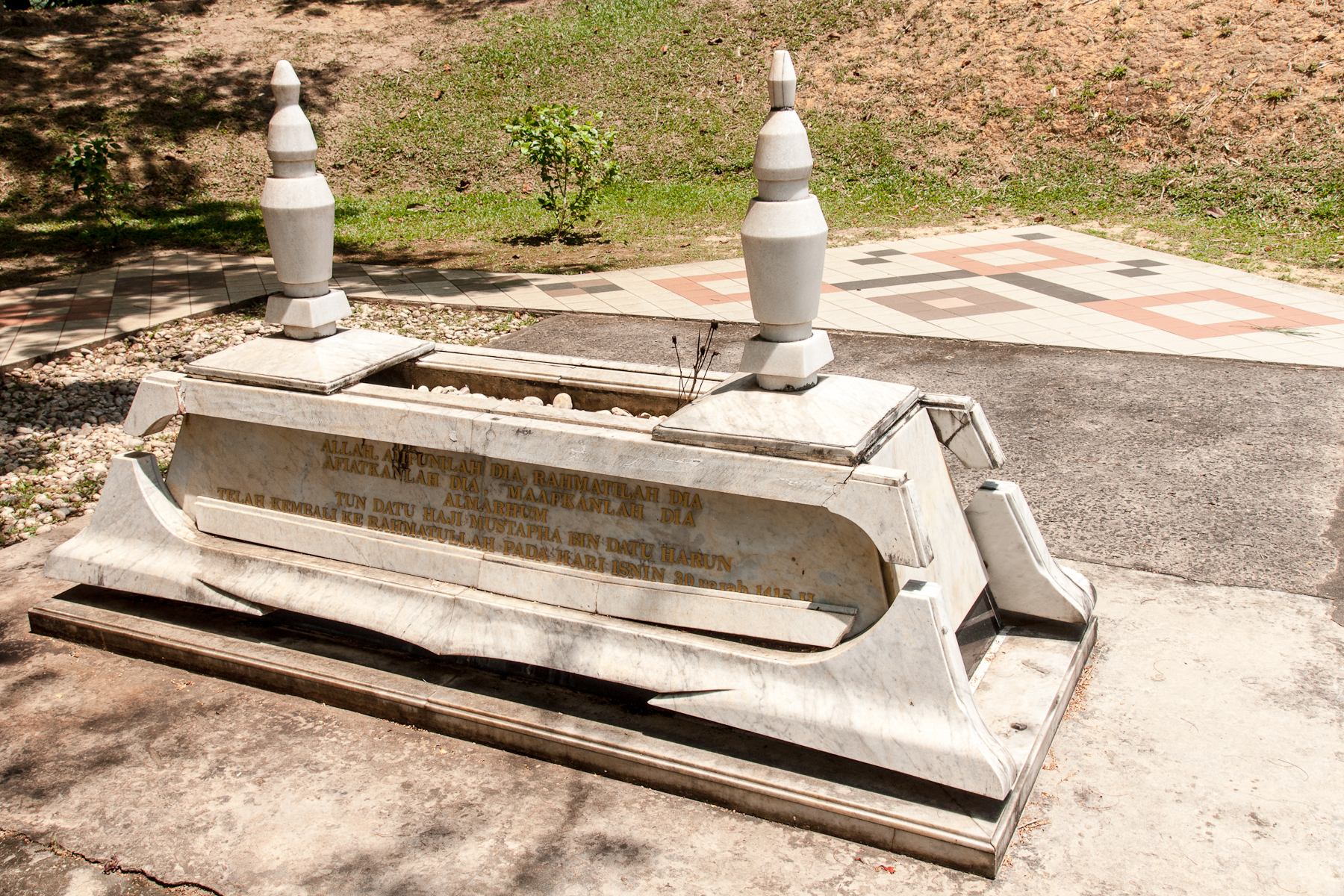
Mustapha's tomb in Putatan, Penampang District

He died on 2 January 1995 at the Sabah Medical Centre (now rebranded as the Sabah Women's and Children Hospital) in Likas, Kota Kinabalu, at the age of 76. His mortal remains were laid in state at his residence in the Tanjung Aru suburb of Kota Kinabalu before he was later buried at the Muslim cemetery in Kampung Ulu/Ulu Seberang, Putatan, Penampang which was formerly used as a fortress by the late Paduka Mat Salleh and the State Government has named the cemetery to "Taman Memorial Tun Datu Haji Mustapha". Some of his other legacy include:

- During the 8th Convocation Ceremony of UMS (Universiti Malaysia Sabah) held on 2–3 September 2006, he was conferred a Doctor of Philosophy in (Social Development) posthumously.
- The state government renamed the Sabah Foundation Building to Tun Mustapha Tower, as a token of appreciation for his positive contributions to the state.
- Tun Mustapha Marine Park, a marine park in Kudat, Sabah was named after him.
- A MARA institution boarding school, MRSM Tun Mustapha is named after him in Tawau, Sabah.

== Honours ==
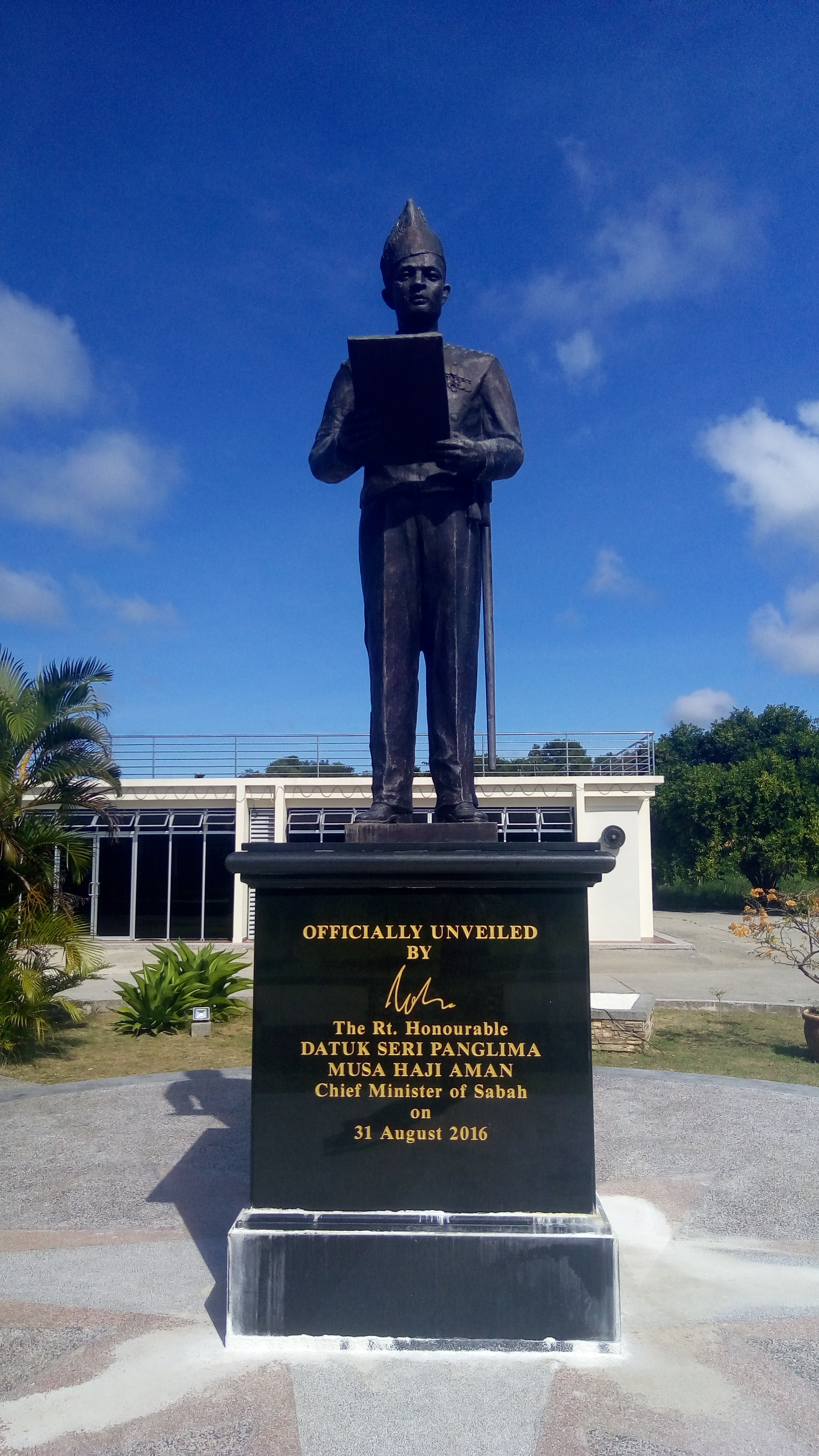
Statue of Tun Mustapha in front of his residence in Kudat.

=== Honours of Malaysia ===
- Malaysia
  - Grand Commander of the Order of the Defender of the Realm (SMN) – Tun (1964)
- Sabah
  - Grand Commander of the Order of Kinabalu (SPDK) – Datuk Seri Panglima (1966)
- Pahang
  - Grand Knight of the Order of the Crown of Pahang (SIMP) – formerly Dato', now Dato' Indera (1969)
- Johor
  - Knight Grand Commander of the Order of the Crown of Johor (SPMJ) – Dato' (1970)
- Selangor
  - Knight Grand Commander of the Order of the Crown of Selangor (SPMS) – Dato' Seri (1976)
- Perlis
  - Knight Grand Commander of the Order of the Crown of Perlis (SPMP) – Dato' Seri (1971)
- Perak
  - Knight Grand Commander of the Order of Cura Si Manja Kini (SPCM) – Dato' Seri (1971)
- Sarawak
  - Knight Commander of the Most Exalted Order of the Star of Sarawak (PNBS) – formerly Dato', now Dato Sri

=== Foreign Honours ===
- United Kingdom
  - Officer of the Order of the British Empire (OBE)

Political offices
New creation	Yang di-Pertua Negeri of Sabah; 1963–1965	Succeeded by Pengiran Ahmad Raffae Pengiran Omar
Preceded by Peter Lo Sui Yin	Chief Minister of Sabah; 1967–1975	Succeeded by Mohammad Said Keruak
