= United Sabah National Organisation =

Political party

- Malay name: Pertubuhan Kebangsaan Sabah Bersatu ڤرتوبوهن كبڠسأن سابه برساتو
- Chinese name: 沙巴聯合民族組織 沙巴联合民族组织; Shābā liánhé mínzú zǔzhī
- Abbreviation: USNO
- Founder: Mustapha Harun
- Founded: December 1961
- Dissolved: 1996
- Merged into: UMNO Sabah (de jure, 1991) PBS (de facto, 1993)
- Succeeded by: United Sabah National Organisation (New) (2013)
- National affiliation: Sabah Alliance (1963-1976); Barisan Nasional (1973-1975, 1976-1981, 1986-1993); Sabah Front (1981-1986)

The United Sabah National Organisation (Malay: Pertubuhan Kebangsaan Sabah Bersatu; abbrev: USNO) was a political party in North Borneo and later Sabah, Malaysia. The widely known Sabah's Muslim indigenous especially Suluk-Bajau ethnic based party was founded by the third Chief Minister of Sabah; Mustapha Harun in December 1961.

Prior to the formation of Malaysia on 16 September 1963, USNO played a major role in cooperation with United Pasokmomogun Kadazan Organisation (UPKO), led by Donald Stephens, and the Federation of Malaya, in attaining independence from the British. UPKO was then dissolved and merged into USNO in 1967.

The party came into power after winning the 1967 state election. USNO remained in power until 1975 under Mustapha's leadership, and until 1976 under Mohammad Said Keruak's leadership.

In 1975, USNO's secretary-general Harris Salleh quit the party and teamed up with former UPKO leader Stephens who had become Sabah Governor and had returned to politics to create a new party called Sabah People's United Front (BERJAYA). This new party defeated USNO in the 1976 state election to form government until 1985. USNO consistently continued to participate in state elections of 1981, 1985, 1986, and 1990, winning several state electorates, however never enough to form government again.

After the 1990 state election when BERJAYA themselves were ousted by United Sabah Party (PBS), Mustapha returned to team-up with Harris again in a merger of USNO and BERJAYA for his long-envisaged initiative to create the Sabah chapter of peninsula-based United Malays National Organisation (UMNO) with Mustapha himself became its first chief of UMNO Sabah. In 1993, USNO was finally de-registered by the federal Registrar of Societies (RoS). Six of its legislators joined the Sabah UMNO while the rest joined the opposition PBS.

== Government offices ==
=== State governments ===
As a deregistered party after 1993, remaining USNO members who regretted the merger with UMNO supported PBS government and contested 1994 election under PBS logo

- Sabah (1963–1967, 1967–1976, 1993–1994)

Note: bold as Chief Minister, italic as junior partner

== General election results ==
Election	Total seats won	Seats contested	Total votes	Share of votes	Outcome of election	Election leader
1964	6 / 159	13		appointed by Legislative Assembly	▲6 seats; Governing coalition (Alliance Party)	Mustapha Harun
1969	13 / 144	15	31,947	1.33%	▲7 seats; Governing coalition (Alliance Party)	Mustapha Harun
1974	13 / 154	15			; Governing coalition (Barisan Nasional and Sabah Alliance)	Mustapha Harun
1978	5 / 154	15			▼8 seats; Governing coalition (Barisan Nasional)	Mustapha Harun
1982	0 / 154	19			▼5 seats; No representation in Parliament	Mustapha Harun
1986	5 / 177	15	27,409	0.58%	▲5 seats; Governing coalition (Barisan Nasional)	Mustapha Harun
1990	6 / 180	15			▲1 seats; Governing coalition (Barisan Nasional)	Mustapha Harun
1995	15 / 192	15			▲8 seats; Governing coalition (Barisan Nasional)	Mustapha Harun

=== State elections ===
Sabah State Legislative Assembly
Election	Votes		Seats			Position (Note: As part of electoral coalition.)	Status
Election	Count	%	Result	Won / contested	+/–	Position	Status
1967	64,638	40.7	14 / 32	14 / 25	▲14	▲1st (Sabah Alliance) (Note: Contested on its own against other Alliance members)	Alliance
1971	walkover (Note: Entirely won on walkover, no vote was conducted.)		28 / 32	28 / 28	▲14	▲1st (Sabah Alliance)	Alliance
1976	70,157	37.2	20 / 48	20 / 40	▼8	▼2nd (Sabah Alliance)	Opposition
1981	47,069	20.1	3 / 48	3 / 29	▼17	2nd (Barisan Sabah)	Opposition
1985	74,050	26.8	16 / 48	16 / 43	▲13	2nd	Opposition
1986	62,674	20.3	12 / 48	12 / 27	▼4	2nd	Opposition
1990	95,857	26.1	12 / 48	12 / 38	Steady	▲1st (Barisan Nasional) (Note: Contested on its own against other BN members)	Opposition (1990–1993)
1990	95,857	26.1	12 / 48	12 / 38	Steady	▲1st (Barisan Nasional)	PBS–USNO (1993–1994)

== See also ==
- Politics of Malaysia
- List of political parties in Malaysia
- United Sabah National Organisation (New) (USNO Baru)
