= Abdul Ghani Gilong =

Malaysian politician (1932–2021)

Yang Berbahagia Tan Sri Datuk Seri Panglima Abdul Ghani Gilong PSM SPDK

Minister of Works and Public Amenities
- In office 5 March 1976 – 27 July 1978
- Preceded by: V. Manickavasagam
- Succeeded by: Lee San Choon
- Constituency: Kinabalu

Minister of Works and Energy
- In office 1 January 1972 – 4 March 1974
- Prime Minister: Abdul Razak Hussein
- Preceded by: V. T. Sambanthan
- Succeeded by: V. Manickavasagam
- Constituency: Kinabalu

Minister of Transport
- In office 23 September 1970 – 9 February 1971
- Prime Minister: Abdul Razak Hussein

Minister of Justice
- In office 1969–1970

Minister of Sabah Affairs and Civil Defence
- In office 1968–1969
- Prime Minister: Tunku Abdul Rahman

Member of the Malaysian Parliament for Kinabalu
- In office 1969–1978
- Preceded by: Constituency created
- Succeeded by: Mark Koding

Personal details
- Born: Ganie Gilong; 30 May 1932 Kampung Matan, Ranau, British North Borneo (now Sabah, Malaysia)
- Died: 6 March 2021 (aged 88) Kota Kinabalu, Sabah, Malaysia
- Resting place: Kampung Silou, Ranau, Sabah
- Citizenship: Malaysian
- Party: BERJAYA; USNO; UPKO
- Other political affiliations: Barisan Nasional (BN)
- Spouse(s): Halimah Ginsos; Amisah Ibrahim
- Children: 8 (Halimah), 4 (Amisah)
- Education: Sacred Heart School, Kota Kinabalu
- Occupation: Politician

Abdul Ghani bin Gilong (30 May 1932 – 6 March 2021) was a Malaysian politician. He was a federal cabinet minister in various portfolios from 1968 to 1978.

== Early life ==
Ghani was born as Ganie Gilong on 30 May 1932 in Ranau to Gilong Rantau, a prominent trader and Bonggo Dumaring. He had five siblings.

He started his tertiary education in an attap school in his hometown in 1938. During the Second World War, he attended Japanese school and later, a primary school run by the British, before continuing his education at Sacred Heart School in Primary One again. He attended school up to Form Four thus he did not sit for the Form Five examination as he thought that he was too old at 23 years old.

In 1955, he returned to Ranau to help his parents and was very active in business and volunteerism during his time in Ranau. He was also the first agent to look after visitors and climbers to Mount Kinabalu. Ghani became a Ranau district councilor and was in residency team to represent Ranau. His past experience of hardship to walk for four days from Ranau to reach Kota Kinabalu made him resolve to find ways to alleviate this problem and to initiate the road links between the east and west coasts of Sabah later in his life.

== Political career ==
His political career started after an acquaintance with Donald Stephens who has encouraged Ghani to write short articles in North Borneo News and Sabah Times. Their friendship had triggered his involvement in the new political party United National Kadazan Organisation (UNKO) founded by Donald in 1961. This also led to his collaboration in the efforts for the independence of Sabah and formation of Malaysia in 1963.

In 1962, after returning from New Zealand from a six-month leadership course, Ghani was first appointed to the legislative assembly by Sir William Goode to represent Ranau until he resigned to take up his federal ministerial post in 1968. When UNKO and United Pasok Momogun Organisation (UPMO) merged into United Pasokmomogun Kadazan Organisation (UPKO) in 1964 and Ghani was elected deputy president of UPKO.

In 1967, he stood and won as a candidate for UPKO. In 1967, UPKO was dissolved and all members were absorbed into United Sabah National Organisation (USNO) during which Ghani became a vice president of USNO.

In 1968, Ghani at that time at the age of 36, was appointed to the federal cabinet by Tunku Abdul Rahman to the post of Minister of Sabah Affairs and Civil Defence. He served in the federal cabinet from 1968 to 1978, holding the portfolios of Minister of Justice, Minister of Transport, acting Minister of Health and Agriculture, Minister of Works and Utilities.

Ghani was re-elected to parliament in 1974, and in 1975 joined Tun Fuad Donald Stephens and Harris Salleh in the formation of the new political party Sabah People's United Front (BERJAYA). He however left BERJAYA before the state election in 1976, rejoining USNO, and later lost his parliamentary seat in the 1978 election.

== Death ==
On 6 March 2021, Abdul Ghani Gilong died due to complications suspected caused by COVID-19 at 12.12 am at Queen Elizabeth Hospital, Kota Kinabalu. He was 88. He was buried at the family burial ground in Kampung Silou, Ranau.

== Honours and awards ==
=== Honours of Malaysia ===
- Malaysia
  - Recipient of the Malaysian Commemorative Medal (Silver) (PPM) (1965)
  - Commander of the Order of Loyalty to the Crown of Malaysia (PSM) – Tan Sri (1999)
- Sabah
  - Grand Commander of the Order of Kinabalu (SPDK) – Datuk Seri Panglima (1990)

=== Awards ===
- Luguan Siou Kaamatan (Tokoh Kaamatan) in 2010
- Tokoh Malaysia in 2010

=== Honorary degrees ===
- Malaysia
  - Honorary Ph.D. degree from Universiti Malaysia Sabah (2017)

== See also ==
- List of deaths due to COVID-19 - notable individual deaths
