= St. Michael's Church, Penampang =

St. Michael's Church
- Malay: Gereja St. Michael
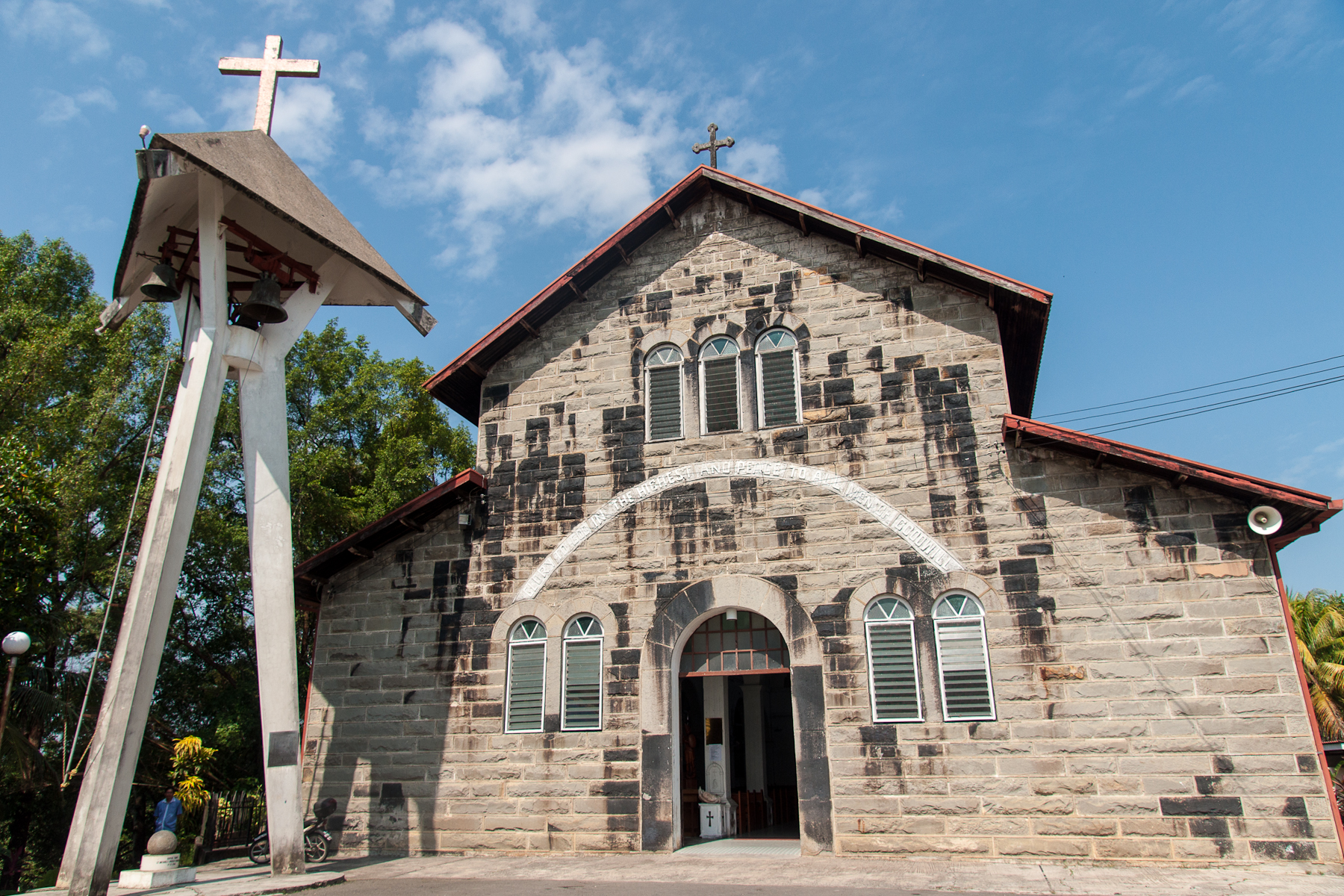
- St. Michael's Church with the bell tower.
- St. Michael's Church
- 5°54′29.44″N 116°6′36.55″E
- Location: Jalan Dakata, P.O. Box 110, Donggongon, 89507 Penampang, Sabah
- Country: Malaysia
- Denomination: Roman Catholic

History
- Founded: 1947

Architecture
- Functional status: Active

Administration
- Diocese: Kota Kinabalu
- Deanery: South West Coast

Clergy
- Priest: Rev. Fr. Wilfred Atin

St. Michael’s Church is a Roman Catholic church in Donggongon, Penampang District, Sabah, Malaysia. It is the oldest church in the district of Penampang and the second-oldest stone church in Sabah, after St. Michael’s and All Angels Church in Sandakan, an Anglican church in the city, also bearing the same name.

== Naming ==
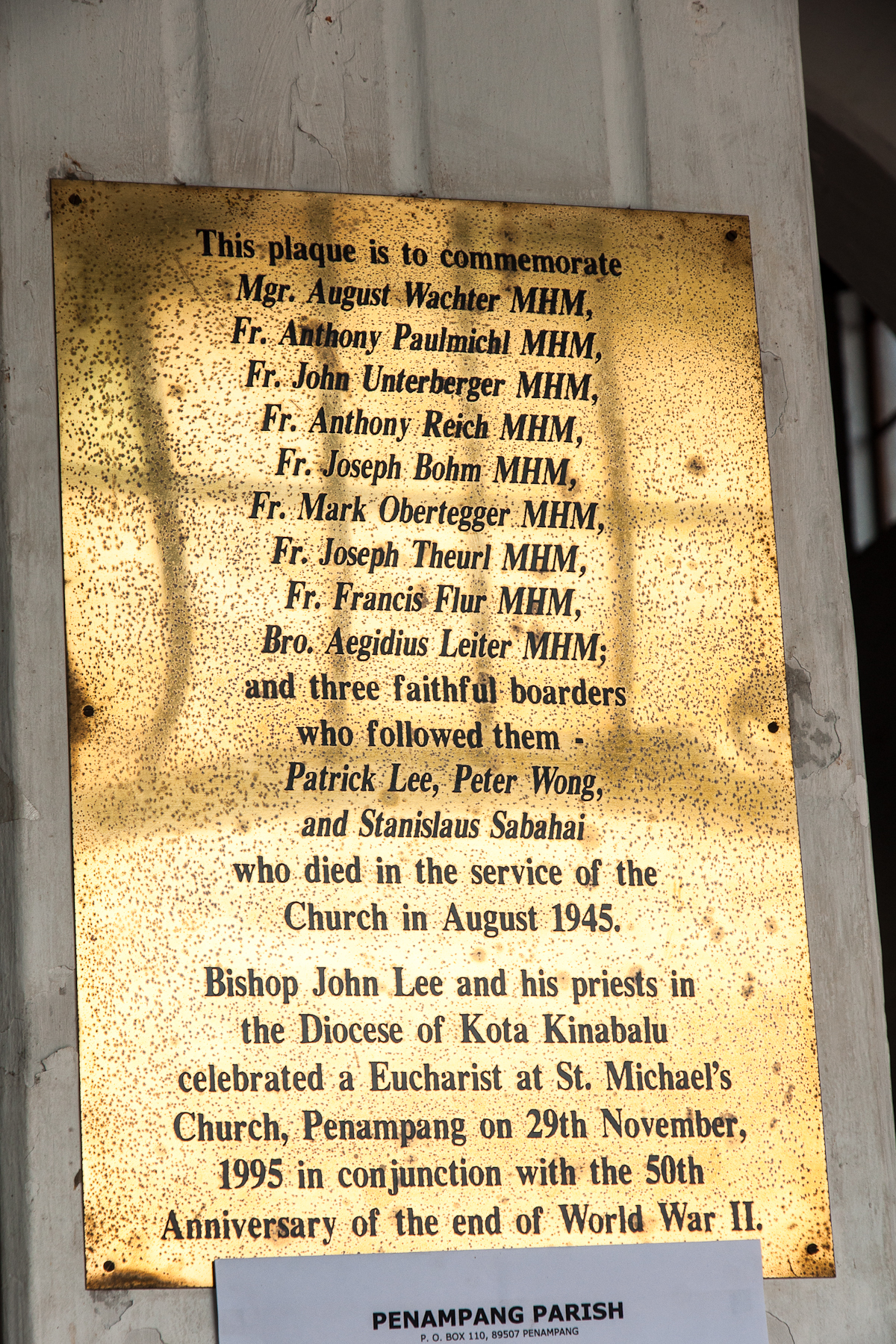
A plaque.

According to oral tradition, the Missionaries were oppressed by the local territorial spirits. They would then say the rosary and call upon the Archangel Michael to defend and protect them. It was then that the priests decided to name the church as St. Michael’s Church because the church was under the protection of St. Michael.

== History ==
The history of the church started with the Mill Hill Missionaries who came to Penampang in 1886. The missionaries, led by Fr. Alexander Prenger, set up a base in Kampung Inobong where a church now known as Sacred Heart Church currently stand. The missionaries then decided to establish a new base at Kg. Dabak, Penampang, which is nearer to the sea, a river known as Moyog river and situated in a plain with rice fields with a low hill that is strategically located and suited for the building of a church. This location is rather strategic since the locals who used the river as a mode of transportation would alight at Kasigui which was then the only and first town in the District of Penampang from the coast en route to the interior.

In 1890, Fr. Rientjes arrived in Penampang from Sandakan to help Fr. Prenger and was put in charge of Penampang Mission. Around the same year, the wooden building of the first Penampang church began. In July 1890, Fr. Prenger was called back to teach at Mill Hill College. Fr. Rientjes was left alone. He stayed at Penampang to work among the people in Penampang and visited Inobong on every other Sunday. After the death of both Fr. Prenger and Fr. Rientjes, other missionaries carried out the work in Penampang Mission.

In the early 1920s, the number of Catholics increased in Penampang. The small church could no longer hold the growing number of Catholics. In February 1922, the Penampang Church was extended by 33 feet. The number of children attending Sunday school also increased. There were four schools in Penampang and the Mission works in Penampang increased and the number of Catholics also raised as more and more outstations were being opened.

By the early 1930s, the building of the Stone Church began, initiated by Fr. August Wachter. As early as April 1929, Fr. Wachter already had the intention of building this church. The foundation stone for the new church was laid during a special ceremony on 29 September 1936, the Feast of St. Michael. Fr. Wachter had specially invited Brother Aegidius Leiter, the master builder, to be responsible for the building of the church. Nonetheless, the construction was postponed during the Second World War only to resume and complete in 1947.

== Architecture ==
The church is located on a steep hill and is built with stones. The church also includes a cemetery, a bell tower, a grotto of Mary, the rectory, parish hall, and a religious centre.

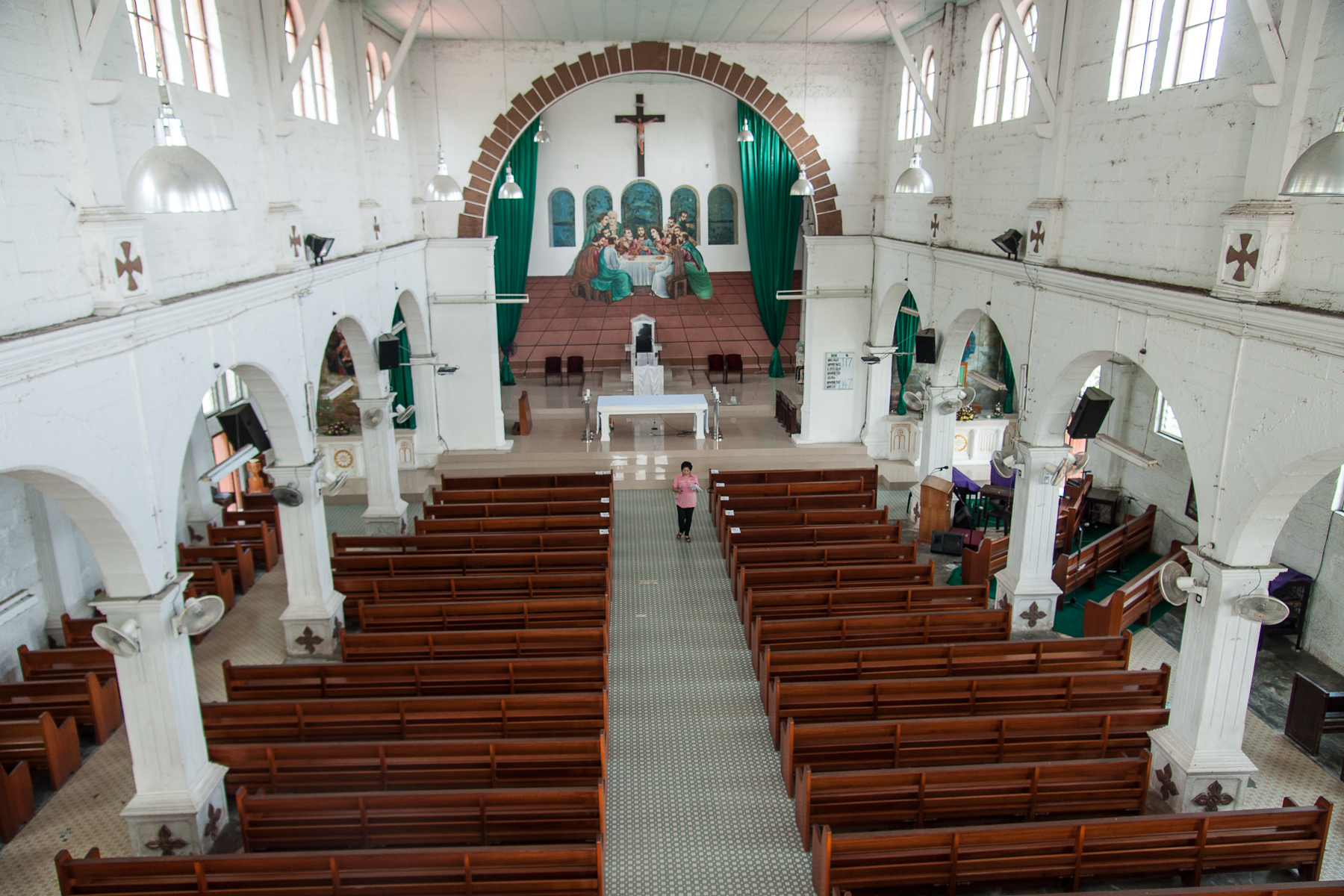
The interior of the church.

=== Interior ===
The church consists of a nave and two aisles, each with a flat wooden ceiling. The side aisles and the upper sides of the nave are provided with arched windows that provide the interior with plenty of natural light. There is a gallery, which is accessible by a narrow spiral staircase to the entrance area. The church interior is equipped with wooden benches; about 20 double rows in the nave and 15 benches in the left aisle. The right aisle seats are reserved for choir and band. The chancel or altar is adorned with a scene of the Last Supper.

=== Bell tower ===
The bell tower was built after the war in the memory of Fr. Wachter. It consists of a concrete structure in the form of a tripod, topped with a tetrahedron-shaped roof. At the peak of the roof is a cross. The three bells of the tower must be rung by hand. At the foot of the bell tower is a spherical time capsule made of concrete that was poured on 31 December 2000.

=== Grotto ===
A grotto of Mary is located on the south side of the church square.

=== Cemetery ===
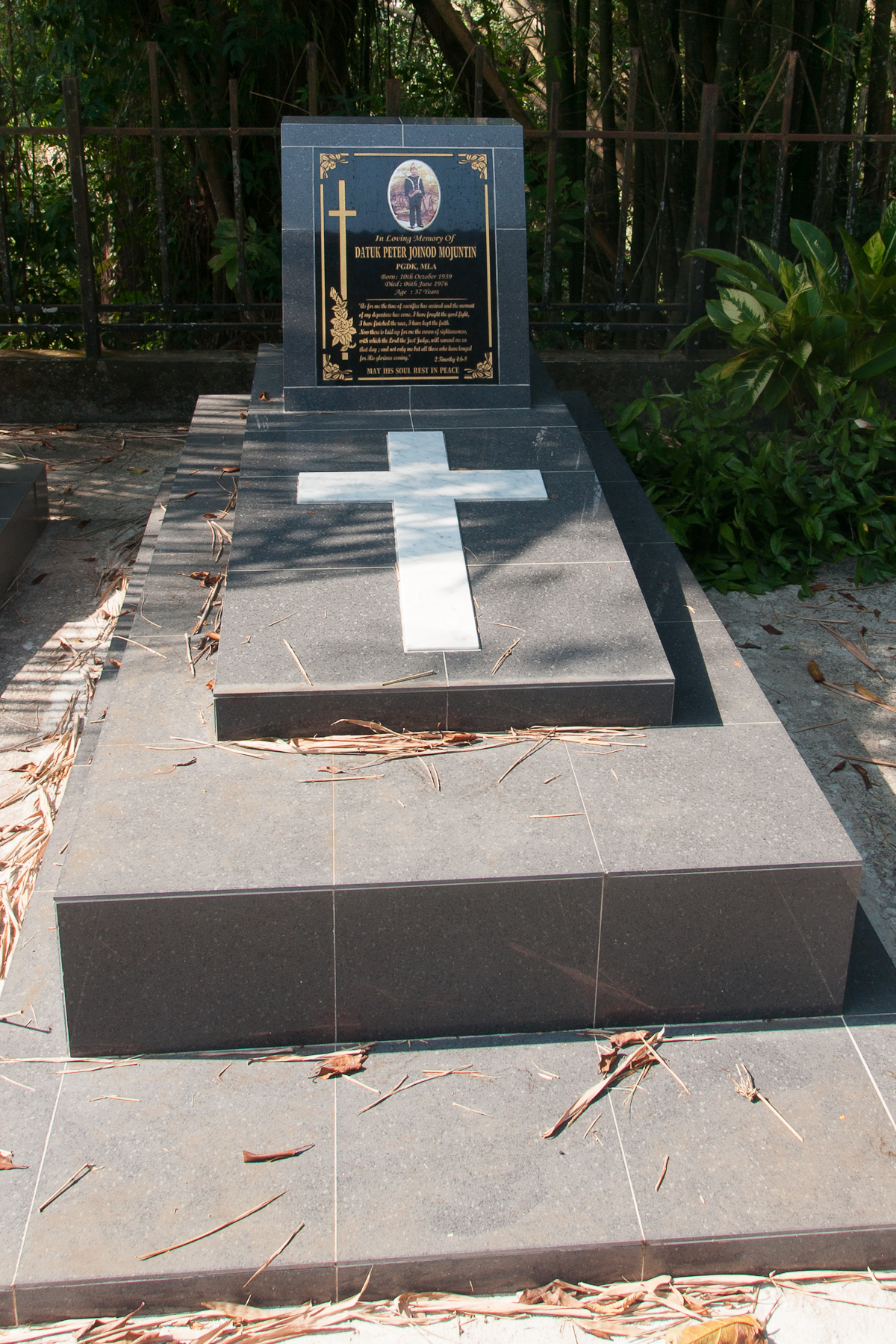
The tomb of Datuk Peter Mojuntin.

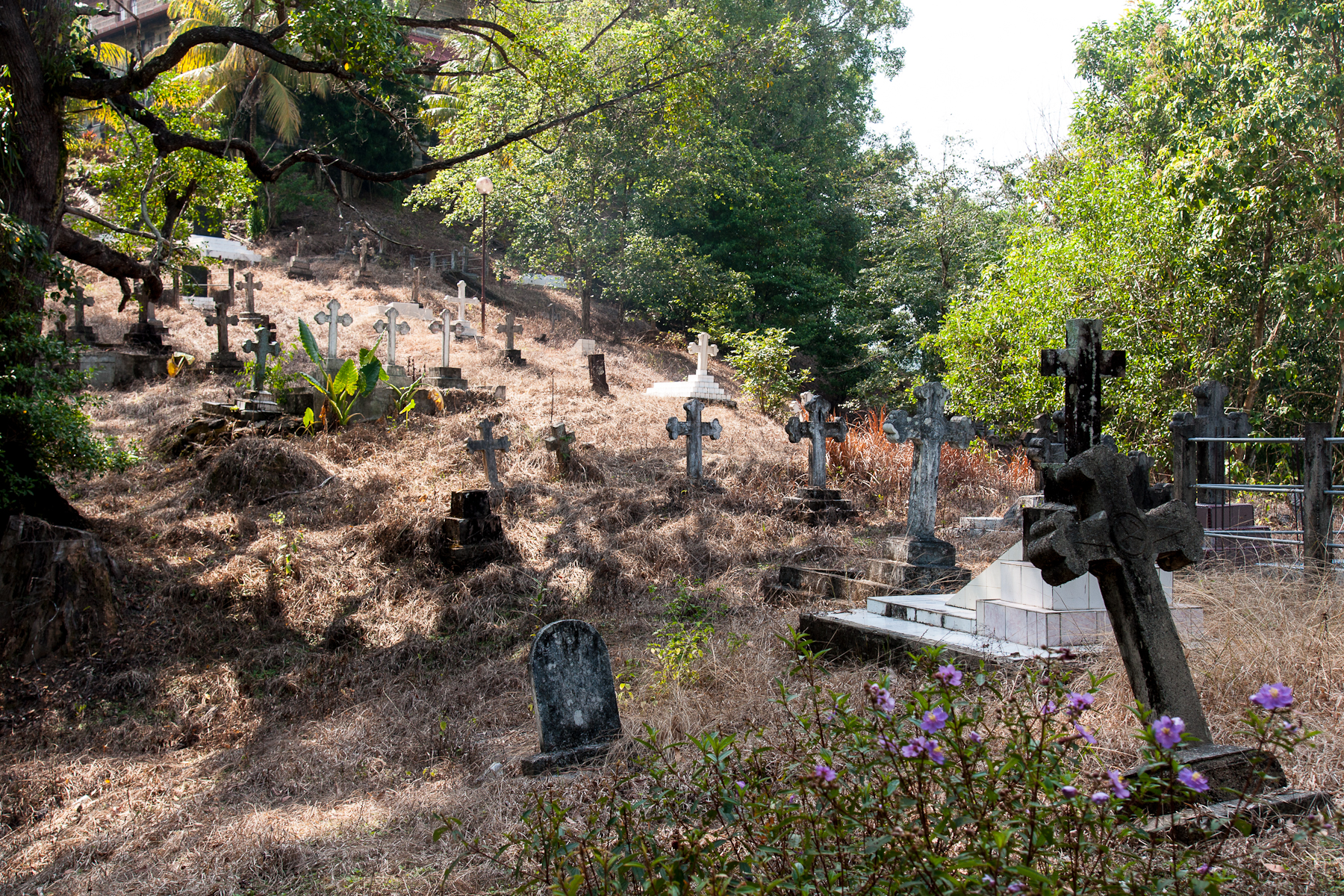
The cemetery of the church.

The cemetery consists of two parts. First is a small park-like ground, directly located to the left wing of the church. Only two tombs are located here, which are the grave of Rev. Fr. Anthony Paul Michael, containing the bones of the priest recovered in Tenom and the grave of Datuk Peter Mojuntin, a minister of Sabah, who died in the Double Six Crash tragedy.

The second part of the cemetery is below the hill behind the church. In addition to the traditional graves, there are also burials in clay jars, in accordance of the tradition of the Kadazan-Dusun.

== SM St. Michael, Penampang ==
The Catholic missionaries in Penampang began in 1888 with the education of the local population. The first school building was built at the foot of the hill was named St. Michael's School. In 1924 Rev. Verhoeven built a two-story school building that served as a church, a school, a boarding school and as a residence for priests simultaneously. This building was used until 1966 as a school. Today's old block was built by Rev. Michael Henselmans in 1958. In the 1970s, the school acquired its current name SM St. Michael.

== Literature ==
- John Rooney: Khabar Gembira: History of the Catholic Church in East Malaysia and Brunei, 1880-1976, 1981, Burns and Oates Ltd Wellwood North Farm rd, Turnbridge Wells Kent, ISBN 978-0860121220
- Fr. William Poilis: A Popular History of the Catholic Church in Sabah
