= Kiulu (state constituency) =

Sabah state constituency

Kiulu (N15)
Sabah constituency

State constituency
- Legislature: Sabah State Legislative Assembly
MLA
Joniston Bangkuai
GRS
- Constituency created: 1967
- First contested: 1967
- Last contested: 2025

Demographics
- Population (2020): 17,565
- Electors (2025): 17,191

Kiulu is a state constituency in Sabah, Malaysia, that has been represented in the Sabah State Legislative Assembly. It is mandated to return a single member to the Assembly under the first-past-the-post voting system.

== Demographics ==
As of 2020, Kiulu has a population of 17,565 people.

Ethnic breakdown of Kiulu's electorate as of 2020
1. Sabah Bumiputera (97.2%)
2. Malay-Muslim Bumiputera (1.81%)
3. Other ethnicities (0.64%)
4. Chinese (0.36%)

== History ==
=== Polling districts ===
According to the gazette issued on 31 October 2022, the Kiulu constituency has a total of 15 polling districts.

State constituency	Polling Districts	Code	Location
Kiulu (N15)	Rangalau	170/15/01	SK Rangalau Baru
Kiulu (N15)	Pekan Kiulu Pusat	170/15/02	SMK Tun Fuad Stephens; SK Kitapol; SK Pekan Kiulu
Kiulu (N15)	Malangang	170/15/03	SK Malangang Baru
Kiulu (N15)	Togop	170/15/04	SK Togop
Kiulu (N15)	Kelawat	170/15/05	SK Kelawat; Dewan Serbaguna Kampung Hamad
Kiulu (N15)	Bongol	170/15/06	SK Bongol
Kiulu (N15)	Simpangan & Pekan Nabalu	170/15/07	Dewan Serbaguna Pekan Nabalu; Dewan Kg.Siba BLBKN Pekan Nabalu
Kiulu (N15)	Taginambur	170/15/08	SK Taginambur
Kiulu (N15)	Pukak	170/15/09	SK Pukak
Kiulu (N15)	Mantob	170/15/10	SK Mantob
Kiulu (N15)	Pahu	170/15/11	SK Pahu
Kiulu (N15)	Tiong Simpodon	170/15/12	SK Tiong Perungusan
Kiulu (N15)	Poring	170/15/13	SK Poring
Kiulu (N15)	Tomis	170/15/14	SK Tomis
Kiulu (N15)	Tudan	170/15/15	SK Tudan

=== Representation history ===
Member of Sabah State Legislative Assembly for Kiulu
Assembly	No	Years	Member	Party
Constituency created
3rd	N08	1967–1971	Payar Juman	UPKO
4th	N08	1971–1976	Payar Juman	Alliance (USNO)
5th	N15	1976	Fuad Stephens	BN (BERJAYA)
5th	N15	1976–1981	Rahimah Stephens	BN (BERJAYA)
6th	N15	1981–1985	Rahimah Stephens	BN (BERJAYA)
7th	N12	1985–1986	Gisin Lombut	PBS
8th	N12	1986–1990	Gisin Lombut	PBS
9th	N12	1990–1994	Gisin Lombut	GR (PBS)
10th	N12	1994–1995	Gisin Lombut	GR (PBS)
10th	N12	1995–1999	Gisin Lombut	BN (PDS)
11th	N11	1999–2002	Louis Rampas	PBS
11th	N11	2002–2004	Louis Rampas	BN (PBS)
12th	N11	2004–2008	Louis Rampas	BN (PBS)
13th	N11	2008–2013	Louis Rampas	BN (PBS)
14th	N11	2013–2018	Joniston Bangkuai	BN (PBS)
15th	N11	2018	Joniston Bangkuai	BN (PBS)
15th	N11	2018–2020	Joniston Bangkuai	PBS
16th	N15	2020–2025	Joniston Bangkuai	GRS (PBS)
17th	N15	2025–present	Joniston Bangkuai	GRS (PBS)

== Election results ==
Sabah state election, 2025
Party	Candidate	Votes	%	∆%
GRS	Joniston Bangkuai	4,316	36.51	▲36.51
Homeland Solidarity Party	Terence Sinti	2,879	24.35	▲24.35
UPKO	Joisin Romut	2,736	23.14	▼12.50
KDM	Henry Saimpon	1,192	10.08	▲10.08
Heritage	Saibin Gunsari	389	3.29	▲3.29
Sabah Native Co-operation Party	Trevor Kenneth Maringking	176	1.49	▲1.49
Sabah Dream Party	Niyky @ Niky J Bosikol	78	0.66	▲0.66
Sabah Nationality Party	Dusi Gingging	56	0.47	▲0.47
Total valid votes		11,822		
Total rejected ballots		113		
Unreturned ballots		18		
Turnout		11,953	69.53	▼2.28
Registered electors		17,191		
Majority		1,437	12.16	▼3.45
GRS gain from PBS		Swing		?
Source(s) "RESULTS OF CONTESTED ELECTION AND STATEMENTS OF THE POLL AFTER THE OFFICIAL ADDITION OF VOTES" (PDF).

Sabah state election, 2020
Party	Candidate	Votes	%	∆%
PBS	Joniston Bangkuai	4,007	51.25	▲51.25
UPKO	Wilfred Madius Tangau	2,786	35.64	▲35.64
Love Sabah Party	Andau Yasun	363	4.64	▼0.55
LDP	Rozylyn @ Rosalyn Gelunu	274	3.50	▲3.50
Independent	Dominic Yasun	266	3.40	▲3.40
Independent	Jolianis Lampog	20	0.26	▲0.26
Total valid votes		7,716	98.70	
Total rejected ballots		78	1.00	
Unreturned ballots		24	0.31	
Turnout		7,818	71.81	▼8.94
Registered electors		10,887		
Majority		1,221	15.61	▲1.81
PBS gain from BN		Swing		?
Source(s) "RESULTS OF CONTESTED ELECTION AND STATEMENTS OF THE POLL AFTER THE OFFICIAL ADDITION OF VOTES".

Sabah state election, 2018
Party	Candidate	Votes	%	∆%
BN	Joniston Bangkuai	4,336	41.46	▲1.25
Sabah Heritage Party	Jo-Anna Sue Henley Rampas	2,893	27.66	▲27.66
STAR	Terence Sinti	2,457	23.49	▲12.49
Love Sabah Party	Gaibin Ransoi	543	5.19	▲5.19
Total valid votes		10,229	97.80	
Total rejected ballots		175	1.67	
Unreturned ballots		55	0.53	
Turnout		10,459	80.75	▼0.75
Registered electors		12,953		
Majority		1,443	13.80	▲13.33
BN hold		Swing		
Source(s) "RESULTS OF CONTESTED ELECTION AND STATEMENTS OF THE POLL AFTER THE OFFICIAL ADDITION OF VOTES".

Sabah state election, 2013
Party	Candidate	Votes	%	∆%
BN	Joniston Bangkuai	3,745	40.21	▼17.92
PKR	Rhodes Panilau	3,701	39.74	▼0.23
STAR	Terence Sinti	1,025	11.00	▲11.00
Independent	John Hussein	517	5.55	▲5.55
SAPP	Tindil Sindin Gonsobil	129	1.39	▲1.39
Total valid votes		8,988	96.50	
Total rejected ballots		171	1.84	
Unreturned ballots		26	0.28	
Turnout		9,314	81.50	▲10.20
Registered electors		11,424		
Majority		44	0.47	▼17.69
BN hold		Swing		
Source(s) "KEPUTUSAN PILIHAN RAYA UMUM DEWAN UNDANGAN NEGERI". Archived from the original on 2022-10-10.

Sabah state election, 2008
Party	Candidate	Votes	%	∆%
BN	Louis Rampas	4,051	58.13	▼0.70
PKR	Gaibin Ransoi	2,785	39.97	▲39.97
Total valid votes		13,155	98.11	
Total rejected ballots		132	1.89	
Unreturned ballots		0	0.00	
Turnout		6,968	71.30	▲4.61
Registered electors		9,773		
Majority		1,266	18.16	▼17.96
BN hold		Swing		
Source(s) "KEPUTUSAN PILIHAN RAYA UMUM DEWAN UNDANGAN NEGERI SABAH BAGI TAHUN 2008".

Sabah state election, 2004
Party	Candidate	Votes	%	∆%
BN	Louis Rampas	3,712	58.83	▼14.74
Independent	Joisin Romut	1,433	22.71	▲14.74
PASOK	Gaibin Ransoi	978	15.50	▲15.50
Total valid votes		6,123	97.04	
Total rejected ballots		186	2.95	
Unreturned ballots		1	0.02	
Turnout		6,310	66.69	▼9.39
Registered electors		9,461		
Majority		2,279	36.12	▼13.46
BN hold		Swing		
Source(s) "KEPUTUSAN PILIHAN RAYA UMUM DEWAN UNDANGAN NEGERI SABAH BAGI TAHUN 2004".

Sabah state election, 1999
Party	Candidate	Votes	%	∆%
BN	Louis Rampas	5,007	73.34	▲44.09
United Pasokmomogun Kadazandusun Murut Organisation	Gisin Lombut	1,622	23.76	▲23.76
BERSEKUTU	Seibing Gunting	142	2.08	▲2.08
Total valid votes		6,771	99.18	
Total rejected ballots		56	0.82	
Unreturned ballots		0	0.00	
Turnout		6,827	76.08	▼0.45
Registered electors		8,974		
Majority		3,385	49.58	▲9.08
BN gain from PBS		Swing		?
Source(s) "KEPUTUSAN PILIHAN RAYA UMUM DEWAN UNDANGAN NEGERI SABAH BAGI TAHUN 1999".

Sabah state election, 1994
Party	Candidate	Votes	%	∆%
PBS	Gisin Lombut	4,354	69.75	▲3.24
BN	Sulah Rampas	1,826	29.25	▲29.25
Total valid votes		6,180	99.01	
Total rejected ballots		62	0.99	
Unreturned ballots		0	0.00	
Turnout		6,242	76.53	▼1.54
Registered electors		8,156		
Majority		2,528	40.50	▼10.00
PBS hold		Swing		
Source(s) "KEPUTUSAN PILIHAN RAYA UMUM DEWAN UNDANGAN NEGERI SABAH BAGI TAHUN 1994".

Sabah state election, 1990
Party	Candidate	Votes	%	∆%
PBS	Gisin Lombut	3,709	66.51	▲6.00
USNO	Gaibin Ransoi	893	16.01	▲16.01
BERJAYA	Patrick Godomon	552	9.90	▼26.30
Sabah People's Party	Linus Lakudaan Gising	255	4.57	▲4.57
AKAR	Mickey Salleh	90	1.61	▲1.61
Total valid votes		5,499	98.60	
Total rejected ballots		78	1.40	
Unreturned ballots		0	0.00	
Turnout		5,577	78.07	▲2.76
Registered electors		7,144		
Majority		2,816	50.50	▲26.19
PBS hold		Swing		
Source(s) "KEPUTUSAN PILIHAN RAYA UMUM DEWAN UNDANGAN NEGERI SABAH BAGI TAHUN 1990".

Sabah state election, 1986
Party	Candidate	Votes	%	∆%
PBS	Gisin Lombut	2,967	60.51	▲10.11
BERJAYA	Rahimah Stephens	1,775	36.20	▲4.01
Independent	Ayun Meliyon	101	2.06	▲2.06
Total valid votes		4,843	98.78	
Total rejected ballots		60	1.22	
Unreturned ballots		0	0.00	
Turnout		4,903	75.31	▼0.50
Registered electors		6,510		
Majority		1,192	24.31	▲6.10
PBS hold		Swing		
Source(s) "KEPUTUSAN PILIHAN RAYA UMUM DEWAN UNDANGAN NEGERI SABAH BAGI TAHUN 1986".

Sabah state election, 1985
Party	Candidate	Votes	%	∆%
PBS	Gisin Lombut	2,289	50.40	▲50.40
BERJAYA	Rahimah Stephens	1,462	32.19	▼35.04
USNO	Abdul Kadir Baba	637	14.02	▲14.02
BERSEPADU	Gaibin Ransoi	45	0.99	▲0.99
BERSIH	Abdul Kahim Abdul Sanip	36	0.79	▲0.79
Total valid votes		4,469	98.39	
Total rejected ballots		73	1.61	
Unreturned ballots		0	0.00	
Turnout		4,542	75.81	▼1.61
Registered electors		5,991		
Majority		827	18.21	▼20.81
PBS gain from BERJAYA		Swing		?

Sabah state election, 1981
Party	Candidate	Votes	%	∆%
BERJAYA	Rahimah Stephens	2,552	67.23	▲67.23
PASOK	Gisin Lombut	1,071	28.21	▲28.21
PUSAKA	Indra Bayat	42	1.11	▲1.11
Total valid votes		3,665	96.55	
Total rejected ballots		131	3.45	
Unreturned ballots		0	0.00	
Turnout		3,796	77.42	
Registered electors		4,903		
Majority		1,481	39.02	
BERJAYA hold		Swing		

Sabah state by-election, 15 Junr 1976 Upon the death of the incumbent, Fuad Stephens
Party	Candidate	Votes	%	∆%
On the nomination day, Rahimah Stephens won uncontested.
BERJAYA	Rahimah Stephens			
Total valid votes				
Total rejected ballots				
Unreturned ballots				
Turnout				
Registered electors				
Majority				
BERJAYA hold		Swing		

Sabah state election, 1976
Party	Candidate	Votes	%	∆%
BERJAYA	Fuad Stephens	2,552	64.54	▲64.54
PEKEMAS	Patrick Godomon	1,026	25.95	▲25.95
USNO	Payar Juman	284	7.18	▲7.18
Total valid votes		3,862	97.67	
Total rejected ballots		92	2.33	
Unreturned ballots		0	0.00	
Turnout		3,954	92.77	▲5.36
Registered electors		4,262		
Majority		1,111	38.59	▼33.13
BERJAYA gain from UPKO		Swing		?

Sabah state election, 1967
Party	Candidate	Votes	%
UPKO	Payar Juman	4,260	84.19
USNO	Bernad Giom	631	12.47
Independent	Nonon Anad	16	0.32
Independent	Samin Mindot	6	0.12
Total valid votes		4,913	97.09
Total rejected ballots		147	2.91
Unreturned ballots		0	0.00
Turnout		5,060	87.41
Registered electors		5,789	
Majority		3,629	71.72
This was a new constituency created.
