= Peter Joinud Mojuntin =

Malaysian politician

Yang Berhormat Datuk Peter Joinod Mojuntin PGDK MLA
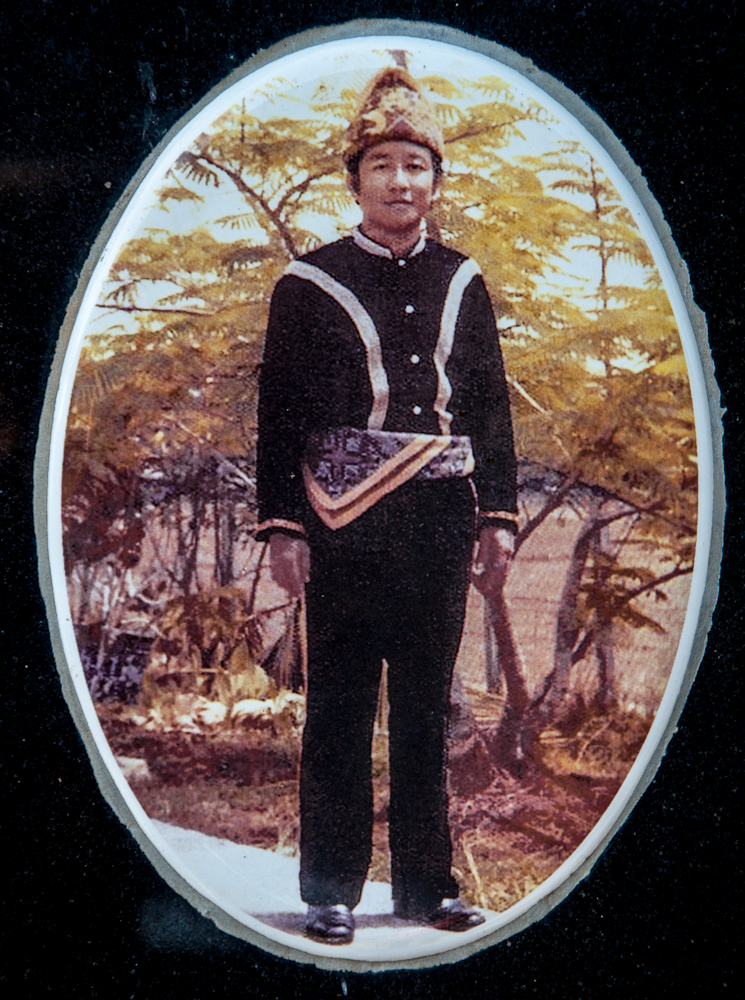
- Golden Son of the Kadazan; Tanak Amas do Kadazan

5th State Minister of Local Government and Housing
- In office 18 April – 6 June 1976
- Preceded by: Salleh Sulong
- Succeeded by: Joseph Pairin Kitingan

Personal details
- Born: Peter Joinod Mojuntin; 11 October 1939 Kampung Hungab, Donggongon, Penampang, British North Borneo (now Sabah, Malaysia)
- Died: 6 June 1976 (aged 36) Kota Kinabalu, Sabah, Malaysia
- Resting place: St. Michael’s Church, Donggongon, Penampang, Sabah
- Party: United National Kadazan Organisation (UNKO); United Pasokmomogun Kadazan Organisation (UPKO); Sabah People's United Front (BERJAYA)
- Spouse(s): Nancy Mary Mobijohn (married on 8 May 1963 until his death)
- Children: Donald Peter Mojuntin (born 1965); Charles Claudius Peter Mojuntin (born 1967); Esther Marianne Mojuntin (1969–2022); Peter Lawrence Mojuntin, Jr. (born 1971); Deidre Christine Mojuntin (1973–2003)

Datuk Peter Joinod Mojuntin, PGDK MLA (11 October 1939 – 6 June 1976) was a politician in the Malaysian state of Sabah and former State Minister of Local Government and Housing in the government of Tun Fuad Stephens. He died along with other politicians in the Double Six Plane Crash in Kota Kinabalu.

== Life ==
Born on 11 October 1939 as the third child but second son out of five siblings in Kampung Hungab, Donggongon, Penampang (for he had an elder brother named George, seven years his senior, born 1932 and died in 1983, then followed by an elder sister, Catherine, two years his senior, born in 1937, but died somewhere in the 1980s-1990s, in which then he was followed by another sister, Maria, born when he was six years of age in 1945 during the war and finally a younger brother, Conrad was born when he was nine years old in 1948, who died in 2020/21), his father, Paul Mojuntin Matanul (1907 – 1971), was an ethnic Kadazan whilst his mother was a mixed-blood Hakka Chinese woman of Sino-Native descent, Magdalene Minjaim Lim (1909 – 1994).

Named at birth as Joinod Mojuntin, he took the name Peter when he converted to Catholicism from animism at the age of 15 in 1954. After obtaining his education at both St. Michael's School in Donggongon, Penampang (1946 – 1954) and the Sacred Heart Secondary School in Tanjung Aru, Jesselton (1955 – 1957), he began his professional, working life as a junior untrained teacher in St. Michael's School, Penampang, his alma mater during primary and middle schooling days. After 2 years, he resigned personally after getting another job offer at the age of 20. He worked at a newspaper known as The North Borneo News and Sabah Times (now known today as the New Sabah Times, but the paper has been closed down since 2020), with Donald Stephens as the owner and the editor-in-chief of that publication, working as a columnist and a part-time journalist under the latter's mentorship, he then later worked as the managing director of Nabahu Corp. Sdn. Bhd., a local co-operative company.

On 8 May 1963, which also happened to be the date of that year's Kaamatan festival, he married Datin Nancy Mary Mobijohn (26 May 1945 – 13 October 2023), who was the daughter of a local politician and a former teacher-cum-colleague of his named Datuk Seri Panglima Lidwin Anthony Mobijohn (1921 – 2002) and wife, Datin Seri Panglima Nora Joguim Sipanil (1923 – 2008), also hailing from the same village and the couple had five children, three boys and two girls, including Donald Peter Mojuntin (born 26 January 1965) and Deidre Christine Mojuntin (28 December 1973 – 1 January 2003), the winner of the Unduk Ngadau pageant in 1989.

In addition, he served as the Chairman of the Penampang District Council for two non-consecutive terms, from 1965 to 1971 and again from 1973 to 1975. Throughout his life, Mojuntin was active in various organisations of the Kadazan. First, he was the president of the youth organisation known as the United Sabah Kadazan Youth Association and then from 1965 to 1973, he was President of the Kadazan Cultural Association (KCA) and in 1975, he became their patron.

== Political career ==
Mojuntin's political career began in 1962 as General Secretary of the United National Kadazan Organisation (UNKO). During his time as secretary, he had prepared an exhaustive memorandum representing the collective views and aspirations of the Kadazan community. From 1963 to 1964, at the young age of 24, he was a member of the Malaysian Parliament. In 1967, he was elected as a deputy in the Legislative Assembly of Sabah, he retained his seat there continuously until his death in 1976. From 1971 to 1973, he was appointed as the Assistant Minister of Industrial Development of the state of Sabah. With the re-election of Tun Fuad Stephens in April 1976, he became the Minister of Housing and Local Government of the state of Sabah. Fifty-three days later, he died in a plane crash.

Peter Mojuntin proved to be a strong and influential leader. Although the United Pasokmomogun Kadazan Organisation (UPKO), could not form a government during the 1967 Sabah general elections, Mojuntin obtained 6908 votes compared to the United Sabah National Organisation (USNO) candidate who received 2089 votes. In 1976, Mojuntin as the candidate from BERJAYA obtained 4020 votes whilst the USNO candidate, Joseph Lanjuat, a former Penampang district officer received 608 votes.

== Death ==
On 6 June 1976, Peter Mojuntin together with Tun Fuad Stephens and several cabinet members aboard a flight from Labuan to Kota Kinabalu were killed in the Double Six Crash about 2 km from the Kota Kinabalu International Airport. Immediately after the disaster, there were conspiracy theories about the cause of the crash because of how loud the crash was. Police Commissioner Yusof Khan recalled:

There were bodies all over the floor of the plane..., they were mangled in different ways. Tun Fuad was sprawled grotesquely, his limbs at an odd angle to his body. I recognised him by his size. Peter Mojuntin had his face untouched and there was only a bloody hole in the back of his head. The smell of blood was terrible and my chaps were at the point of fainting, but we managed to get the bodies out of the plane and lined up near to it so that we could make a quick identification. There were no survivors. I was horrifed to see that almost every BERJAYA senior leader was there. Only Harris was missing.

— Police Commissioner Yusof Khan on 6 June 1976.

With more than 3000 people who attended his funeral, it was said to be the saddest funeral ever in Penampang.

The location of the crash is commemorated with the Double Six Monument, a memorial marked with a stone obelisk that was erected shortly after the accident. The monument is located in Sembulan township, near the Grace Garden housing area in Kota Kinabalu, Sabah along the Jalan Coastal highway leading to Sutera Harbour Resort and the Kota Kinabalu International Airport. His remains now rest at the cemetery of St. Michael's Church, Penampang with his wife, Datin Nancy Mary Mobijohn by his side, who died at the age of 78 on 13 October 2023, after outliving him for 47 years.

== Legacy ==
Datuk Peter Joinod Mojuntin was a leader who worked tirelessly for his people and was ready to sacrifice his life for them. He had no ambitions for himself except for his people and the State of Sabah. He was vocal not only in the State Assembly meetings but also proved to be outspoken even when the Assembly was not in session. Since many Sabahans at the time lived in isolated up river kampongs and remote hill villages, he would travel days and nights with minimum rest. Mojuntin went through the Kinabatangan river by raft to visit the Rungus and Orang Sungai villages of the deep interior to ask for their thoughts and educate them on situations that are happening in Sabah.

Mojuntin belonged to the political opponents of Tun Mustapha. The unwanted expulsion of missionaries and church personnel, which made way for the course of forced conversions and anti-Christian sentiment in Sabah was strongly criticised by him, for he was a loyal devout Catholic. He believed that it was not right and that he was certain that no religion condone such ways and means to win over converts as it defeats the very object of a religion.

Against the raids, arrests, harassment and deportation of the foreign missionaries as well as alleged Islamisation via forced conversions of the citizens of Sabah under Mustapha's tyrannical rule, he personally protested to Prime Minister, Tun Abdul Razak by sending a carbon copied letter to Tun Dr. Ismail Abdul Rahman, who was Deputy Prime Minister cum Home Affairs Minister.

In 2022, Daily Express released a documentary, "Double Six: The Untold Stories Documentary by Daily Express (Sabah)" on YouTube, discussing the Double Six Tragedy along with interviews with the families of the victims.

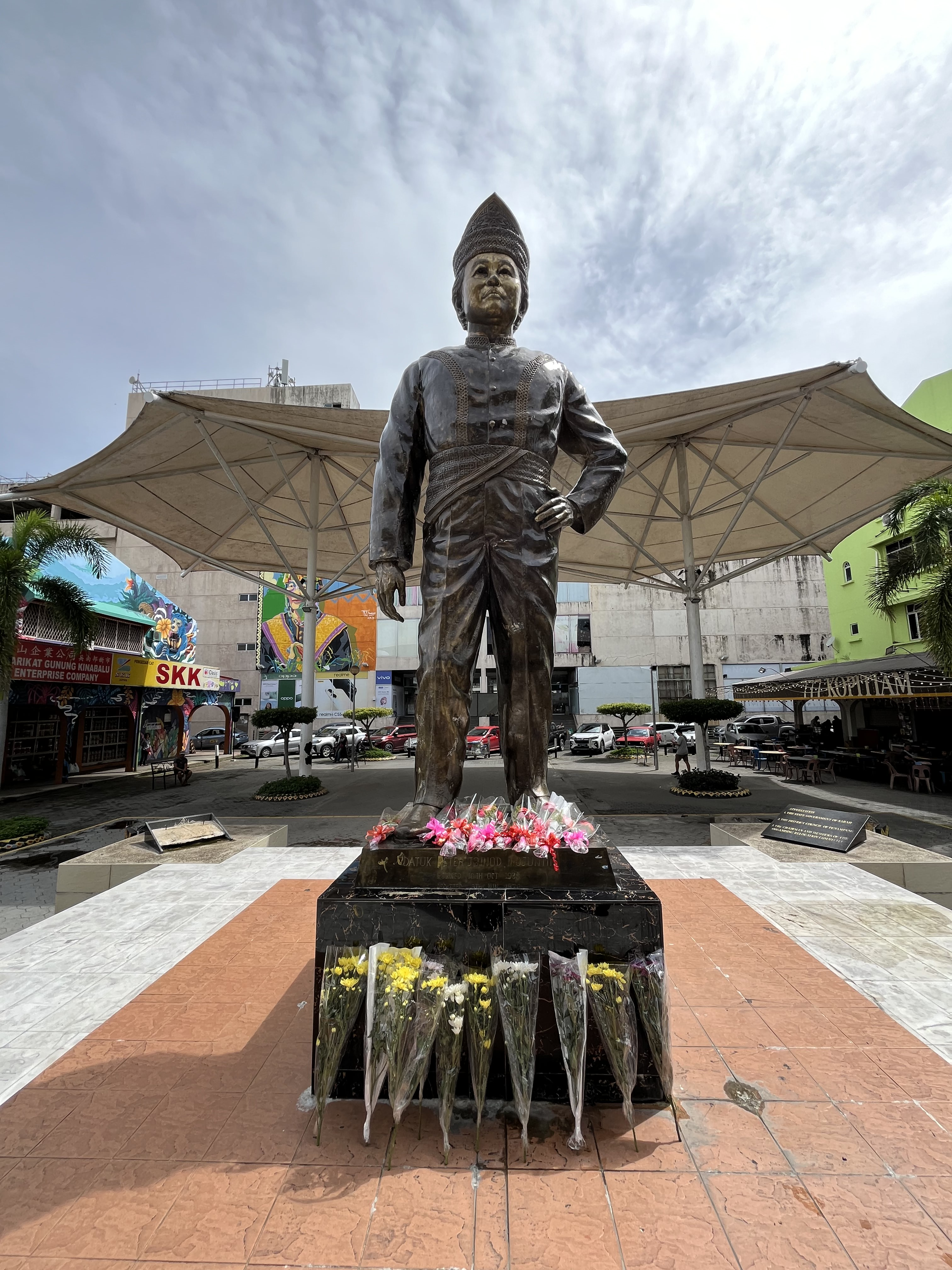
Statue of Datuk Peter Mojuntin in Donggongon, Penampang.

Dubbed as the Golden Son of the Kadazan, Mojuntin's position is documented in the published biography of Bernard Sta Maria and for the alleged defamation of the then-Chief Minister of Sabah, Tun Mustapha, the book was banned by the Malaysian Home Ministry in June 1978. However, throughout the years, multiple groups and non-governmental organisations (NGOs) have voiced out that the ban on the book should be lifted as it contains the history of Sabah before, during and after becoming part of the Federation of Malaysia, including Tan Sri Lim Kit Siang. In May 2024, former chief minister Tan Sri Joseph Pairin Kitingan had expressed his hopes to Prime Minister Datuk Seri Anwar Ibrahim to consider the matter at the closing of the state-level Kaamatan Festival. His family is actively fighting for the book to be unbanned. In June 2024, chairman of the Sunduvan Sabah non-governmental organisation (NGO), Aloysius Danim Siap said, the group wants the younger generation to learn how the Double Six crash changed the state's political landscape. Mojuntin's granddaughter, Atalia Mae Albert Jaua, has taken a stand against the book's ban as well, writing an open letter to Prime Minister Datuk Seri Anwar Ibrahim, calling for its removal.

His life is commemorated in the heart of his hometown in Donggongon, Penampang, being one of the few Sabahan leaders with a statue erected in his honour.

Additionally, SMK Datuk Peter Mojuntin, a secondary school located in Penampang, is a tribute to the man, in honour of his legacy and contributions to the people of the Penampang district. The road along the school is also named after him, as it was also at the area of where he used to live in. In SM St. Michael, Penampang, the school hall is named Dewan Datuk Peter Mojuntin, as he had been a student and taught in the school before venturing into politics.
