= Rahimah Stephens =

Malaysian politician (1930–2022)

Yang Berbahagia Toh Puan Datuk Seri Panglima Hajah Rahimah Stephens SPDK PGDK

Member of the Sabah State Legislative Assembly for Kiulu
- In office 15 July 1976 – 1985
- Preceded by: Fuad Stephens
- Succeeded by: Gisin Lombut

Personal details
- Born: Cecilia June Lutter; 22 October 1930 Beaufort, North Borneo (now Sabah)
- Died: 14 March 2022 (aged 91) Kota Kinabalu, Sabah
- Citizenship: Malaysian
- Party: UPKO; BERJAYA
- Other political affiliations: Barisan Nasional (1976-1986)
- Spouse: Fuad Stephens
- Children: Johari Stephens (adopted stepson, deceased); Affendi Stephens (deceased); Asgari Stephens; Faridah Stephens; Fauziah Stephens (adopted daughter)
- Occupation: Politician

Rahimah Stephens (née Cecilia June Lutter, 22 October 1930 – 14 March 2022) was a Malaysian politician. She was the Member of Sabah State Legislative Assembly for Kiulu from 1976 to 1985. She was also the wife of Fuad Stephens, the first Chief Minister of Sabah.

== Participation in NGO ==
Rahimah was active in the Sabah Anti Tuberculosis Association (SABATA), Malaysian Red Crescent Society, Inner Wheel Club, National Stokees Association, and Senior Citizen Association. She was also the founder of Sabah Heart Fund (SOS).

== Politics ==
In 1961, Rahimah became the first Chief of Women's Wing in UPKO, the party established by her husband, Tun Fuad Stephens. After that, she joined BERJAYA together with her husband and became the Chief of Women's Wing of BERJAYA. She was then elected to become the Member of Sabah State Legislative Assembly for Kiulu after a by-election, caused by the death of her husband. On 17 July 1976, she was appointed as the Welfare Minister of Sabah and became the first woman to be appointed as a Sabah cabinet member in the new administration.

== Election results ==
Sabah State Legislative Assembly
Year	Constituency	Candidate	Votes	Pct.	Opponent(s)	Votes	Pct.	Ballots cast	Majority	Turnout
1976	Kiulu	Rahimah Stephens (BERJAYA)	Unopposed							
1981	Kiulu	Rahimah Stephens (BERJAYA)	2,552	67.23%	Gisin Lombut (PASOK)	1,071	28.21%	3,796	1,481	77.42
1981	Kiulu	Rahimah Stephens (BERJAYA)	2,552	67.23%	Indra Bayat (PUSAKA)	42	1.11%	3,796	1,481	77.42
1985	Kiulu	Rahimah Stephens (BERJAYA)	1,462	32.19%	Gisin Lombut (PBS)	2,289	50.40%	4,542	827	75.81
1985	Kiulu	Rahimah Stephens (BERJAYA)	1,462	32.19%	Abdul Kadir Baba (USNO)	637	14.02%	4,542	827	75.81
1985	Kiulu	Rahimah Stephens (BERJAYA)	1,462	32.19%	Gaibin Ransoi (BERSEPADU)	45	0.99%	4,542	827	75.81
1985	Kiulu	Rahimah Stephens (BERJAYA)	1,462	32.19%	Abdul Kahim Abdul Sanip (BERSIH)	36	0.79%	4,542	827	75.81
1986	Kiulu	Rahimah Stephens (BERJAYA)	1,775	36.20%	Gisin Lombut (PBS)	2,967	60.51%	4,903	1,192	75.31
1986	Kiulu	Rahimah Stephens (BERJAYA)	1,775	36.20%	Ayun Meliyon (IND)	101	2.06%	4,903	1,192	75.31

== Health ==
She died on 14 March 2022 due to heart attack at a private hospital after she fell down at her home and broke her bone.

== Honours ==
- Sabah
  - Commander of the Order of Kinabalu (PGDK) - Datuk (1971)
  - Grand Commander of the Order of Kinabalu (SPDK) - Datuk Seri Panglima (1982)
