= Sabah Democratic Party =

Defunct Malaysian political party

Sabah Democratic Party Parti Demokratik Sabah PDS
- Abbreviation: PDS
- President: Bernard Dompok
- Founder: Bernard Dompok and former Kadazandusun Murut leaders of Parti Bersatu Sabah (PBS)
- Founded: March 1994
- Dissolved: 8 August 1999 (Renamed)
- Split from: United Sabah Party (PBS)
- Succeeded by: United Pasokmomogun Kadazandusun Murut Organisation (UPKO)
- Headquarters: Kota Kinabalu, Sabah.
- National affiliation: Barisan Nasional (BN)
- Colours: Blue, white, red
- Slogan: Misompuru Tokou Wagu; Mari Kita Bersatu Kembali (Let Us Be United Again)

Website
- www.upko.org.my

The Sabah Democratic Party (Malay: Parti Demokratik Sabah; abbrev: PDS) was a political party based in Sabah, Malaysia. It was an ethnically-based party striving to voice the rights and advance the development of Kadazan-Dusun-Murut (KDM) populations of Sabah and the Orang Asli of Peninsular Malaysia.

== History ==
PDS started as Sabah Democratic Party or Parti Demokratik Sabah which was founded by Bernard Dompok and other disgruntled leaders who split from United Sabah Party or Parti Bersatu Sabah (PBS) soon after the Sabah state election, 1994 to join the Barisan Nasional (BN) coalition. PBS had won a majority in the Sabah State Legislative Assembly, but the defections allowed BN to form government. Part of the enticement offered by BN to the defectors was the promise of a rotating Chief Ministers of Sabah post, which Dompok held from 1998 to 1999.

PDS was renamed as United Pasokmomogun Kadazandusun Murut Organisation (UPKO) on 8 August 1999, taking the same UPKO acronym of the defunct original United Pasokmomogun Kadazan Organisation, which was formed and dissolved in the 1960s. The party was re-branded again as United Progressive People of Kinabalu Organisation while maintaining its original UPKO acronym and opening party membership to other races than KDM in 24 November 2019.

== Government offices ==
=== State governments ===
- Sabah (1994–1998, 1998–1999)

Note: bold as Menteri Besar/Chief Minister, italic as junior partner

== General election results ==
Election	Total seats won	Seats contested	Total votes	Voting Percentage	Outcome of election	Election leader
1995	0 / 192	20			; No representation in Parliament	Bernard Giluk Dompok

== See also ==
- Politics of Malaysia
- List of political parties in Malaysia
- United Pasokmomogun Kadazan Organisation (UPKO) (Old)
- United Pasokmomogun Kadazandusun Murut Organisation (UPKO) (New)
- United Progressive People of Kinabalu Organisation (UPKO) (Re-branded)
