= Sabah Air =

Charter airline of Malaysia

Sabah Air Aviation Sdn. Bhd.

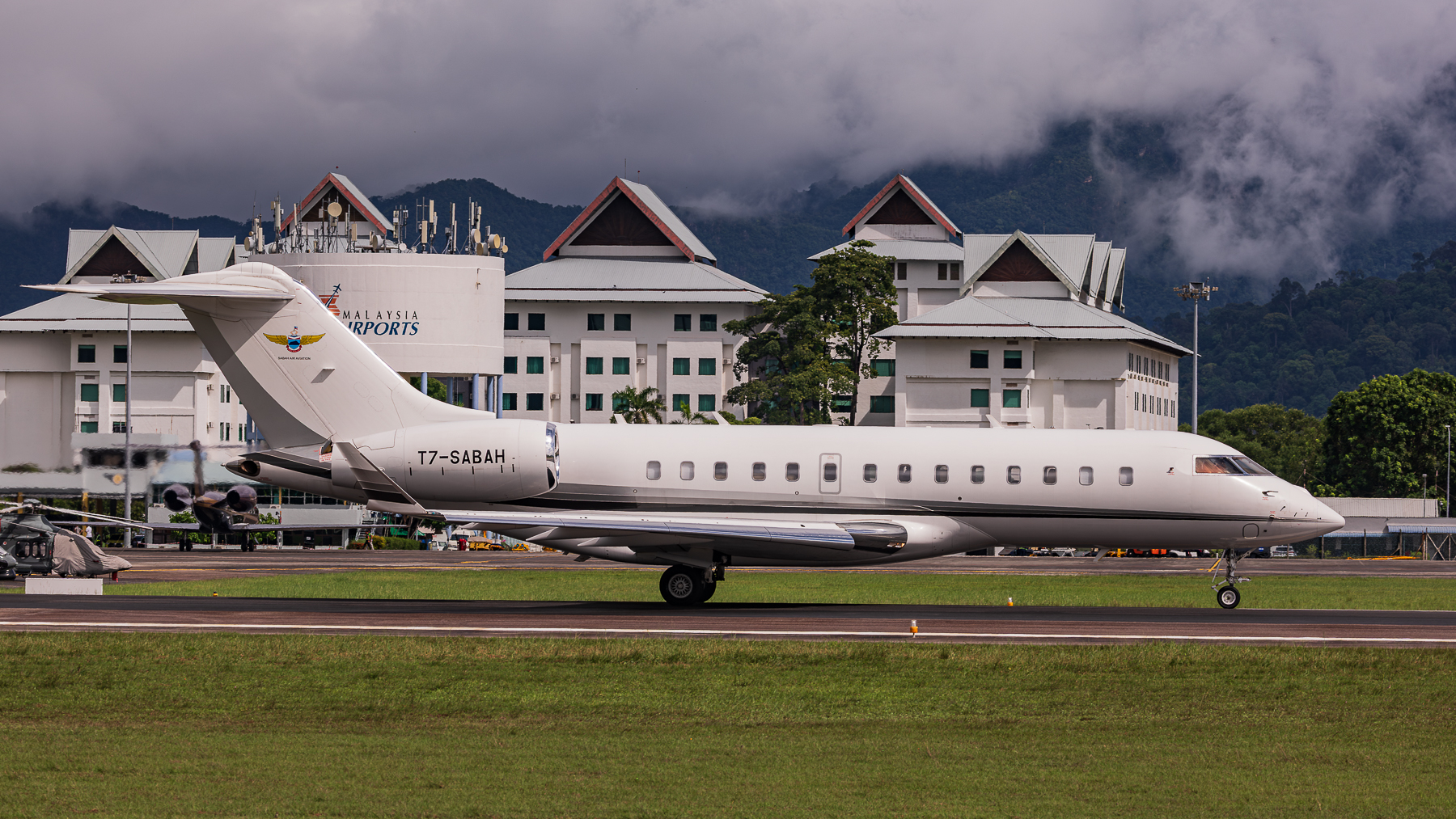
IATA	ICAO	Call sign
SA	SAX	SABAH AIR
- Founded: 1975; 51 years ago
- Operating bases: Kota Kinabalu; Sandakan; Tawau
- Subsidiaries: Sazma Aviation
- Fleet size: 11
- Parent company: Sabah State Ministry of Finance
- Headquarters: Sabah Air Building, Jalan Johor, off Jalan Selangor, Tanjung Aru, 88100, Kota Kinabalu, Sabah, East Malaysia
- Website: www.sabahair.com.my

Sabah Air is a non-scheduled airline with its main base in the Sabah Air Building in Kota Kinabalu, Sabah, Malaysia.

== History ==
The airline was incorporated in 1975 as a private limited company wholly owned by the state government of Sabah, under the purview of the state Ministry of Finance. The board of directors is made up of the state government and the private sector. The role of the board is to formulate a set of strategies and policies to achieve a common goal and vision. The Air Operator Certificate issued to SabahAir by the Malaysian Department of Civil Aviation permits it to carry out non-scheduled air services and flying services to any destinations in Malaysia.

== Services ==
Sabah Air currently provides sightseeing flights above neighbouring islands and beaches in Sabah, such as Gaya, Manukan, and Sapi islands, to visitors. The airline has also charter services for interested customers. Business and visiting flights are arranged for both diplomatic and private missions. Apart from these services, the airline has also provided aerial filming and photography. It has also recently started its Flying Doctor Services, utilising the Airbus Helicopters for the State Government. The airline's offshore operation will be shifted to its subsidiary Sazma Aviation once AOC has been given by DCA. The company involved will be utilising the Sikorsky Helicopter, which have been already delivered.

== Incidents and accidents ==
- On 6 June 1976, 11 passengers including the first chief minister of Sabah, Tun Fuad Stephens, and some state cabinet members were killed in an air crash over Sembulan of Kota Kinabalu district. The plane, which was on its way to Kota Kinabalu airport from Labuan, crashed about 30 minutes after taking off. Until this date, the cause cannot be identified.
- On 29 November 1995, 10 Malaysians and 1 Filipino worker were killed in a helicopter crash at the Samarang Seas between 10 and 11 am The helicopter was inflight from the old airport (currently Terminal 2 Airport) to the Petronas offshore oil rig. Some of the victims' bodies have not been found until this day. The cause of the helicopter crash was an engine operation failure.
- In March 2011, a Sabah Air owned Bell 206 L4 crashed into the jungle near Trusmadi, Sabah.
- On 11 April 2011, one of their helicopters crashed after taking off during bad weather at Sibu Townsquare Phase One. The helicopter was carrying Deputy Prime Minister entourage as he was about to attend another function in conjunction with a Sarawak state election. The pilot was injured. The pilot succumbed to his injuries and died at the Sibu Hospital, later that day.

== Fleet ==
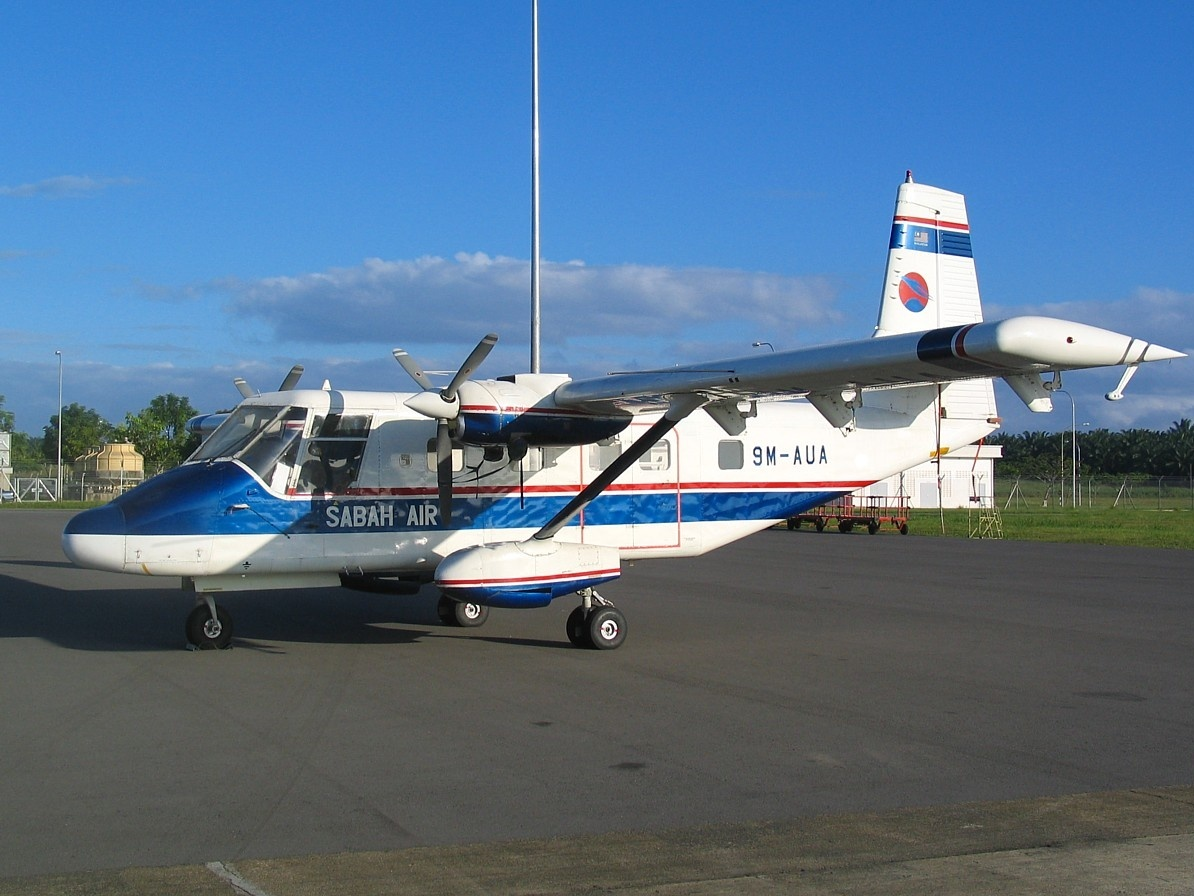
Sabah Air GAF Nomad, Tawau, 2003

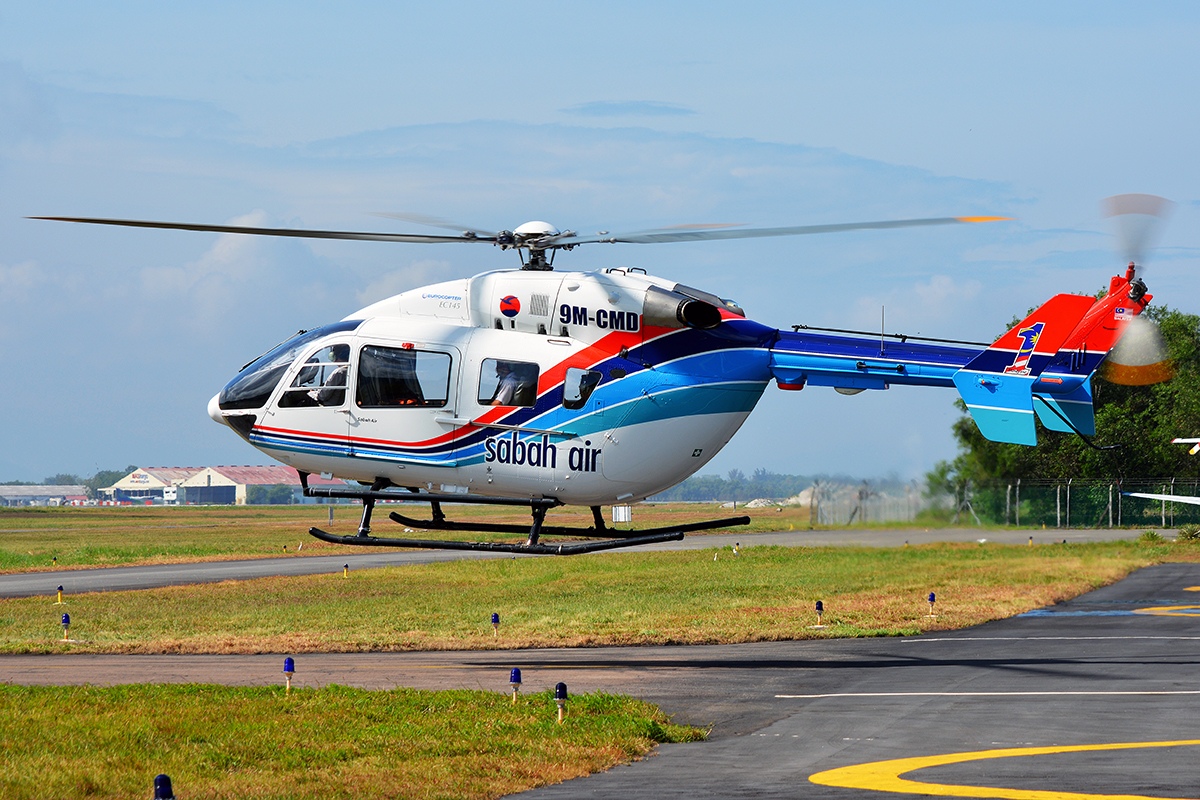
Sabah Air Eurocopter EC-145, Kota Kinabalu, 2014. This helicopter was sold by Sabah Air to another operator.

As of September 2020, the Sabah Air Aviation fleet includes:

Aircraft	Number in Service	Number on Order	Number of Seats
GAF N22B Nomad	1	-	10
Bell 206B Jet Ranger helicopter	4	-	4
Beechcraft King Air	1	-	9
AgustaWestland AW109 Grand	1	-	6
Eurocopter AS355NP	3	-	5
