= SM St. Michael, Penampang =

- Malay: Sekolah Menengah Saint Michael, Penampang

Location
- Kampung Dabak; Donggongon, Penampang, Sabah, 89500; Malaysia
- Coordinates: 5.9092°N 116.1113°E

Information
- Former name: SMK St Michael, Penampang
- Type: Government-aided Catholic secondary school
- Motto: Latin: Ora et Labora; Malay: Berdoa dan Berusaha (Pray and Work)
- Religious affiliation: Roman Catholic
- Founder: Rev Fr. J. Rientjes, MHM
- Authority: Penampang District Education Office
- Oversight: Roman Catholic Archdiocese of Kota Kinabalu
- Principal: Jackson Siga
- Staff: ~50
- Faculty: ~30-40
- Grades: Form 1 to Form 5
- Gender: Male, female
- Age range: 13-17/18 years old
- Enrolment: ~950 students
- Language: Malay, English
- Colours: Red, Yellow, Blue, Green, Orange, Maroon
- Teams: Cheetah, Jaguar, Leopard, Puma
- Yearbook: Michaelian
- Website: www.smstmichaelpenampangsabah.wordpress.com

St. Michael's Secondary School, Penampang (Malay: Sekolah Menengah St. Michael (SMSM), Penampang) commonly known as SM St. Michael is a semi-government Catholic secondary school in Penampang, Sabah, Malaysia. It was named after Saint Michael the Archangel.

The school was built by Mill Hill missionaries to spread Catholicism among the local Kadazan-Dusun community, who were mostly animists. Initially, the school comprised a bamboo structure and gradually evolved into a formidable competitor among traditional top schools. In its early years, Catholic priests resided on campus and provided instruction. With the establishment of Malaysia on September 16, 1963, the school's educational ethos gradually transitioned towards a more secular approach.

The school, built in 1890, is among the oldest in Sabah. It was officially established as a secondary school in 1958. The school hall is named after Datuk Peter Mojuntin, one of Sabah's most prominent leaders. He was one of its prominent alumni and had taught in the school before venturing into politics.

== History ==
The school was built in 1890 by Mill Hill missionaries to convert the local people to Catholicism. At the time, the main mode of transportation was then the Moyog River. As a result, the present day St. Michael's church and the school were built in Kampong Dabak, Penampang, which was close to this river. The initial school structure, constructed from bamboo, served as both a classroom and residence for the church's priests. Its flooring consisted of bare ground, with walls rising about 3 feet from the ground. Students utilized slates and blocks of limestone for writing. However, the school faced challenges, as many local families hesitated to send their children due to concerns that the British North Borneo Company might conscript them into the British Armed Forces. Payment of fees was made in rice, tapioca, yam, fruit and firewood.

The school's current site used to be a paddy field. It was donated to the school by locals. Despite the students having to share their classroom space with village goats, the school gained a commendable reputation, attracting students from as far as Tambunan, Ranau, Papar and Kuala Penyu. This increasing demand led to the establishment of a boarding school, but it was short-lived until about the 1960s, when the school became a fully non-residential school.

During World War II, the Japanese occupation forced the temporary closure of the school. However, the school was not badly damaged, suffering only from machine gun bullets. Rev. Fr. M. Henselmans applied to convert the school to a senior or secondary school on 10 August 1957 to provide the 53 students who were then in primary six with a post-primary school. The school was converted into a secondary school on 10 March 1958 with Tambunan native Marcus Otigil at the helm. The school rose slowly, with the older buildings replaced by newer ones over the years.

== Principals ==
- Marcus Otigil (1958–1961)
- Fr. Roger McGorty (1961–1963)
- Fr. M. Hurley (1963–1965)
- Fr. John Rooney (1966–1967)
- Fr. W. Van Gastel (1967–1970)
- Stanislaus Tendahal (1970–1971)
- Shenton de Rozario (1971–1972)
- Datin Ritamma Joseph (1972–1973)
- Hin Tian Chin (1973–1974)
- K. V. Joshua (1974–1982)
- Katherine Philip (1982–1987)
- Gan Lee Ping (1987–1990)
- Chandran Vengadasamy (1990–1992)
- Range Maurice Majikol (1992–1994)
- Datin Lorna Mathews (1995–2003)
- Fidelis P. Insing (2003–2006)
- Marie Yong Pik Hua (2006–2013)
- Jennifer Asing (2013–2025)
- Jackson Siga (2025–present)

== Notable alumni ==
- Tan Sri Bernard Dompok – former Sabah Chief Minister and former minister in the Malaysian cabinet
- Stacy Angie Anam – Malaysian singer and dancer
- Velvet Lawrence Aduk – singer-songwriter and radio announcer
- Datuk Cornelius Piong – Bishop of the Diocese of Keningau
- Datuk Peter Mojuntin – former state cabinet minister who perished in the 1976 Double Six tragedy
- Datuk Ewon Benedick – current Penampang member of parliament cum Kadamaian state assemblyman
