= Double Six Monument =

- Tugu Peringatan Double Six
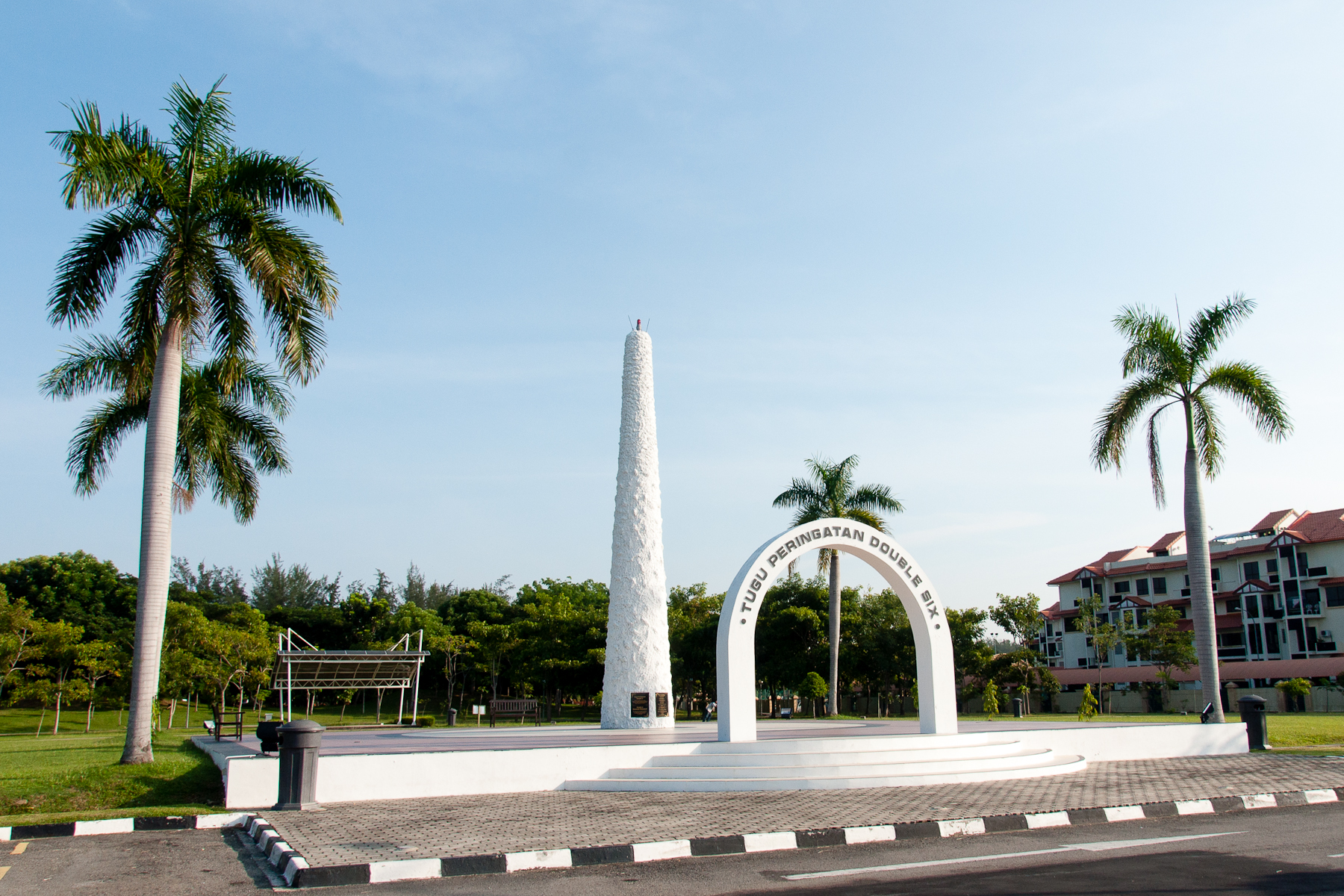
- Interactive map of Double Six Monument
- Location: Sembulan, Kota Kinabalu
- Coordinates: 5°57′43.98″N 116°3′42.52″E
- Type: Obelisk
- Material: Stone
- Dedicated to: State ministers perished in aircraft crash

The Double Six Monument (Malay: Tugu Peringatan Double Six) is a memorial located at the Sembulan neighbourhood of Kota Kinabalu, Sabah, Malaysia which marks the site of 6 June 1976 fatal plane crash known as the Double Six Tragedy bearing the first Chief Minister of Sabah, Tun Fuad Stephens, as well as six other State ministers.

== Features ==
The monument features the list of all victims in the crash, with all are the government officials of Sabah:

- Fuad Stephens – Chief Minister of Sabah
- Peter Mojuntin – State Minister of Housing and Local Government
- Chong Thien Vun – State Minister of Communications and Public Works
- Salleh Sulong – State Finance Minister
- Darius Binion – State Assistant Minister to the Chief Minister
- Wahid Andu – Permanent Secretary of the State Ministry of Finance
- Syed Hussein Wafa – Director of the State Economic Planning Unit
- Ishak Atan – Private Secretary to Tengku Razaleigh Hamzah
- Corporal Mohd Said – Fuad Stephens' bodyguard
- Captain Ghani Nathan – Pilot
- Johari Stephens – Fuad Stephens' eldest son
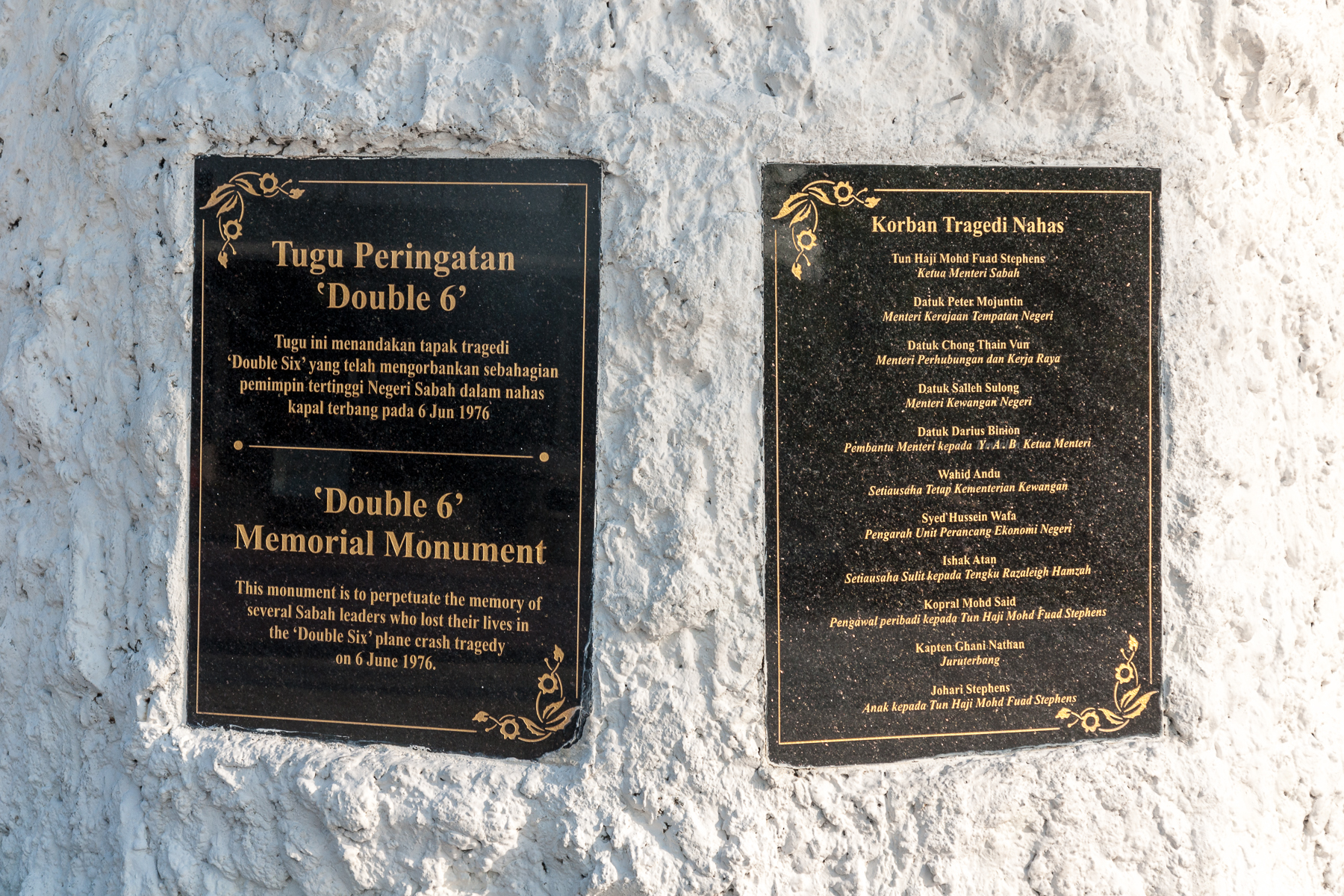
An inscription on the monument and list of the victims.

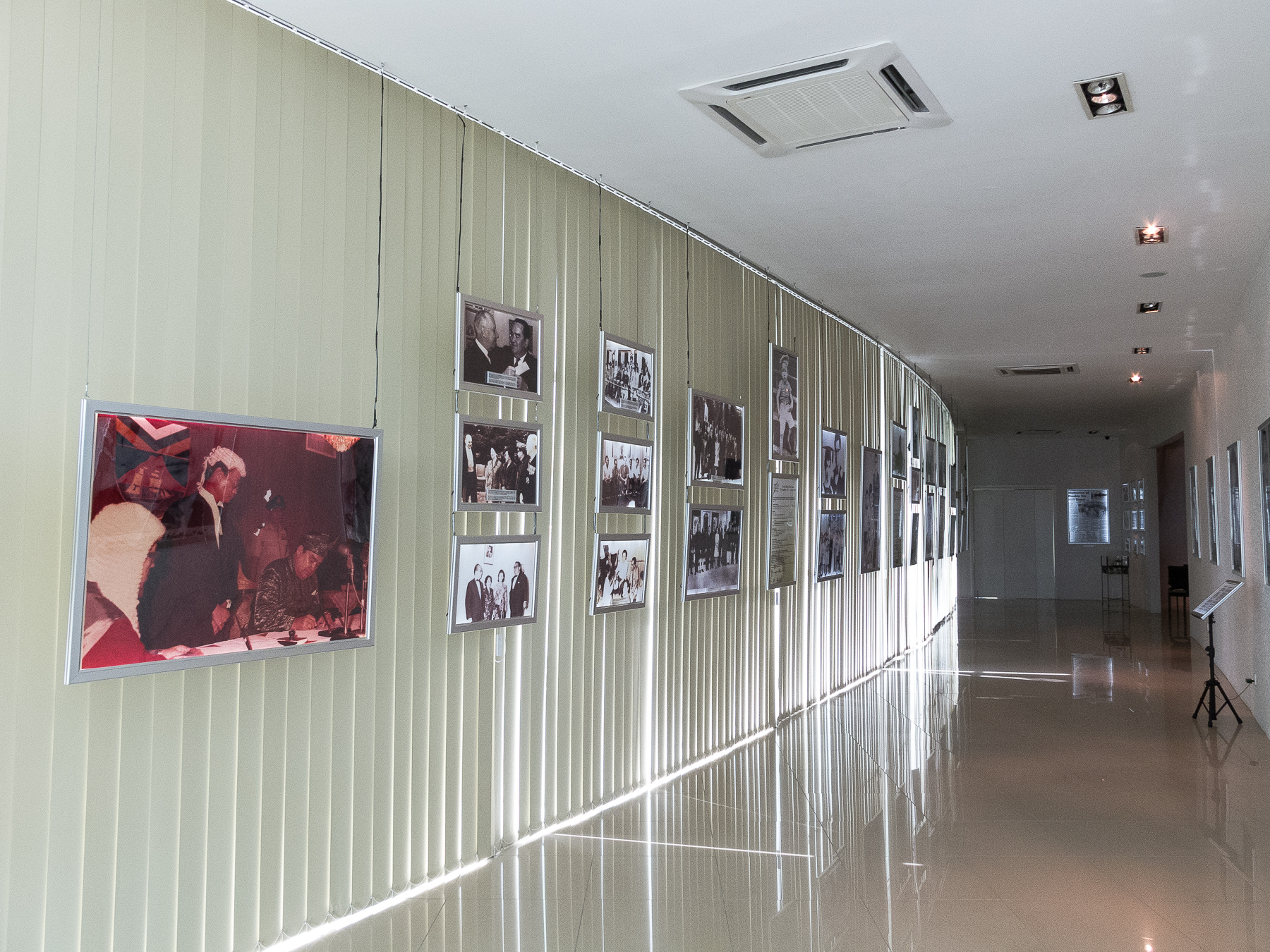
Exhibition hall at the monument site.

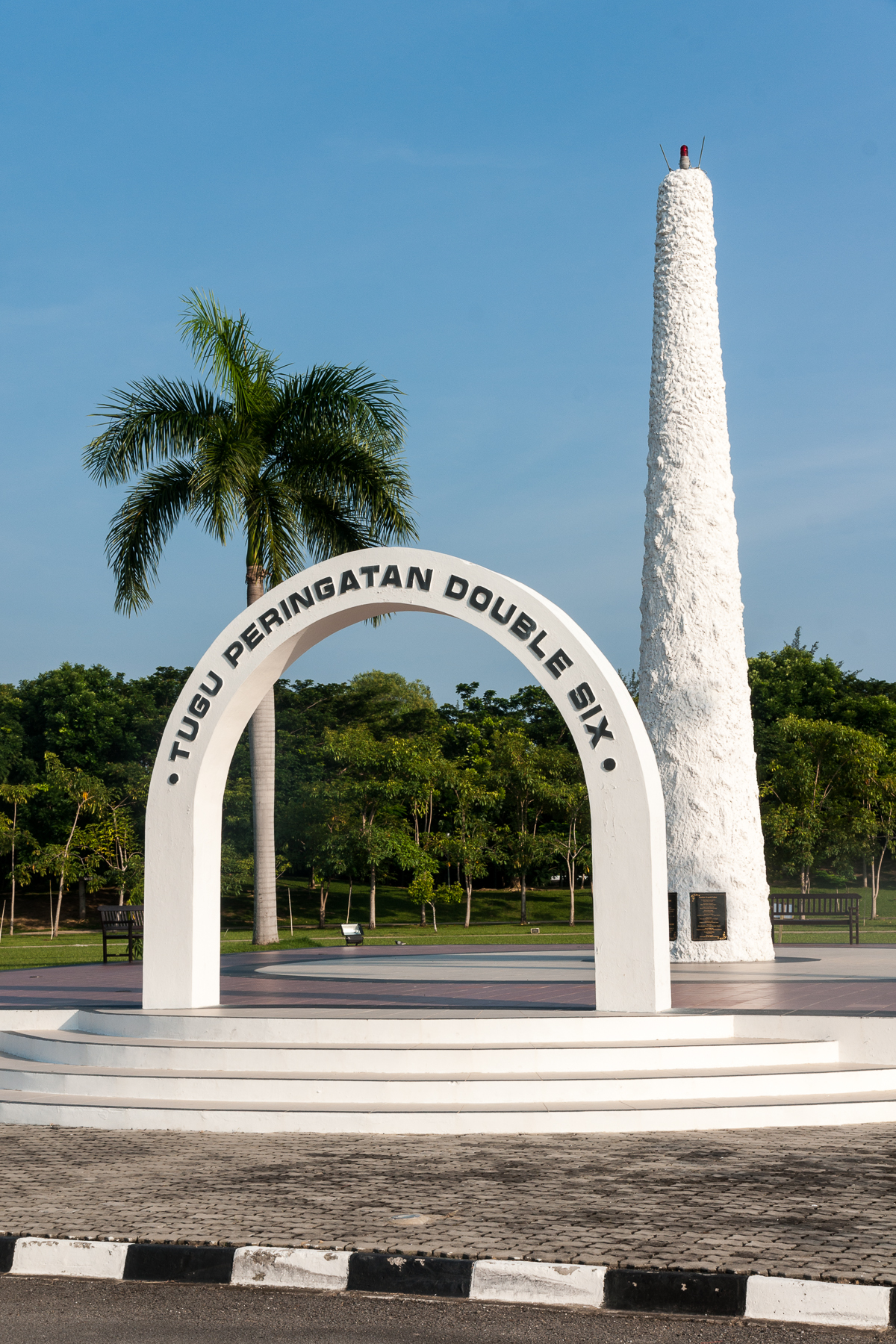
The monument arch.
