= 1976 Sabah Air GAF Nomad crash =

Air accident at Kota Kinabalu, Malaysia

- Wreckage of the GAF Nomad plane on 6 June 1976 at Kota Kinabalu, Malaysia

Accident
- Date: 6 June 1976
- Summary: Aircraft stall due to pilot error and aircraft overloading
- Site: Near Kota Kinabalu International Airport, Kota Kinabalu, Sabah, Malaysia; 5°57′44″N 116°3′42″E

Aircraft
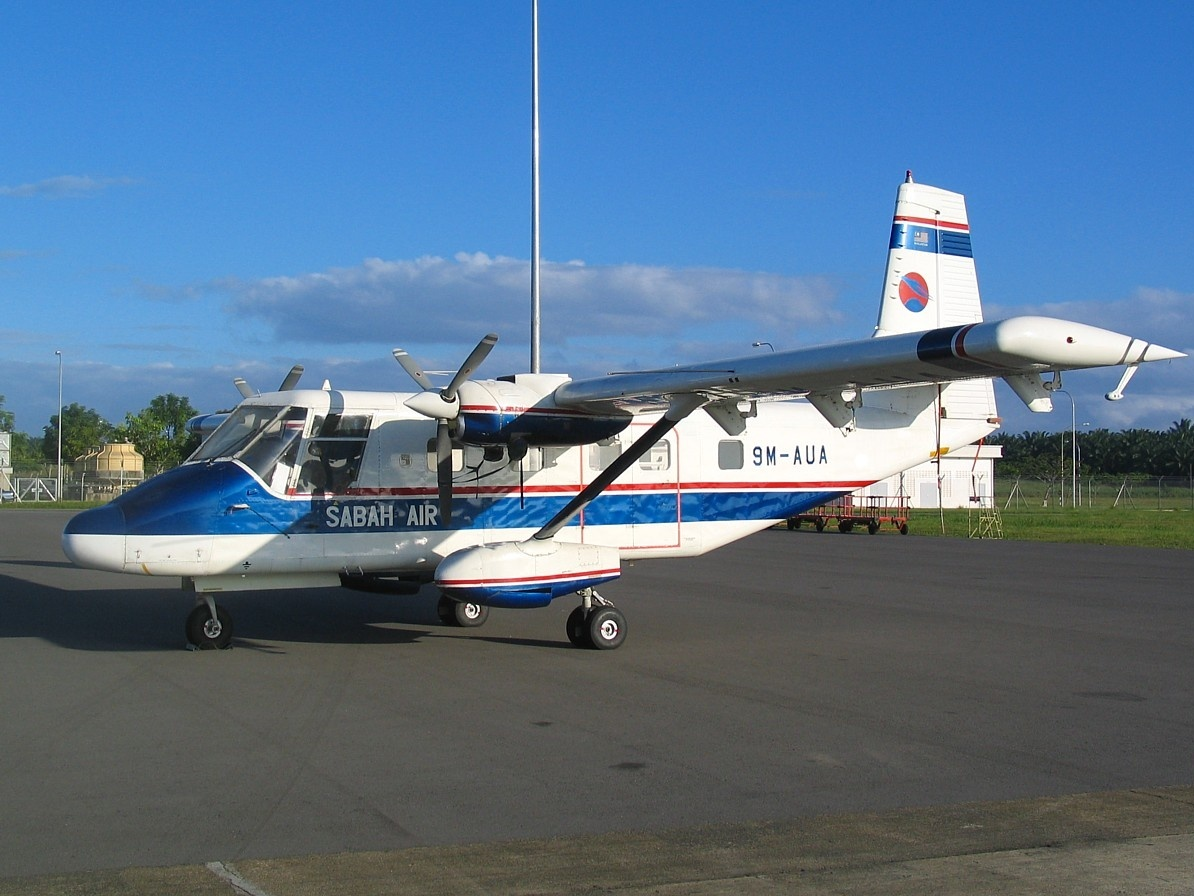
- A similar Sabah Air-operated Nomad in 2003
- Aircraft type: GAF N-22B Nomad
- Operator: Sabah Air
- Registration: 9M-ATZ
- Flight origin: Labuan Airport
- Destination: Kota Kinabalu International Airport
- Passengers: 10
- Crew: 1
- Fatalities: 11
- Survivors: 0

The Double Six Tragedy (Malay: Tragedi Double Six, referring to 6 June, the date of the accident) was an air crash involving a GAF N-22B Nomad of Sabah Air, which took place on 6 June 1976 at Kota Kinabalu, Malaysia, killing several local political leaders, including two top leaders—Tun Fuad Stephens and Datuk Peter Mojuntin.

== Background ==
Tun Fuad Stephens came to power during the 1976 Sabah state elections which were held from 5 April to 14 April 1976. His BERJAYA party won 28 of the 48 seats contested, defeating the previous governing party United Sabah National Organisation (USNO) led by Tun Mustapha. Tun Fuad was sworn in as the 5th chief minister of Sabah on 15 April 1976. On the 53rd day after he won the elections, the aircraft he boarded crashed on the way to Kota Kinabalu Airport.

In the evening of 5 June 1976 (Saturday), Tun Fuad with his brother Benedict Stephens (often known as Ben) and other BERJAYA leaders gathered at Labuan Golf Club to host a post-victory celebration for Tun Fuad's old friend, Tengku Razaleigh Hamzah. Tengku Razaleigh was the federal finance minister and also a chairman of Petronas, a Malaysian oil and gas company. Tun Mustapha, former chief minister of Sabah, had previously refused to sign the 5% oil agreement with Petronas. Tun Fuad, Tengku Razaleigh, and other BERJAYA leaders had a "good chat" until 6:00 am next morning. Then, Tun Fuad and his brother went to Kota Kinabalu in order to flag-off a charity walkathon held in the morning. Datuk Peter Mojuntin, another BERJAYA leader, decided to stay at Labuan in order to officiate at a BERJAYA party branch's victory celebrations.

Tun Fuad met his eldest son Johari Stephens at the walkathon. Tun Fuad insisted that his eldest son Johari should follow him to Labuan in order to visit the official opening of RM 100 million oil refinery. However, Tun Fuad and his son never made the trip to the refinery because of their own busy schedule. Tun Fuad then went back to Labuan Golf Club in order to meet Tengku Razaleigh.

Tun Fuad and Tengku Razaleigh had a lunch at a beach near a village called Layang-Layang. After that, they decided to return to Kota Kinabalu earlier for the preparation of an official banquet at Istana Negeri (State Palace) at night where Tengku Razaleigh and Tun Fuad were to sign the Petronas deal. However, other sources claimed that Tun Fuad disagreed with 10% oil royalty offered by the federal government, instead opting for 20% oil royalty. Conrad Mojuntin, brother of Peter Mojuntin, who was also a former assemblyman for Moyog, claimed that Tun Fuad would never have agreed to the 5%. However, Harris Salleh, in an interview with the Sabah newspaper Daily Express, stated that "Tun Fuad 100 percent supported the arrangement by Parliament. He supported the law, supported the agreement. No difference. He was ready to sign, to cooperate. Because to him, no matter what arrangement you made with the Federal Government, it would be the same thing."

At 3:00 pm, Tun Fuad, Tengku Razaleigh, and other BERJAYA leaders boarded the government-chartered, twin engine, ten-seater Australian Nomad aircraft owned by Sabah Air. Peter Mojuntin was among those aboard. Peter originally planned to board the Malaysia Airlines (MAS) flight back to Kota Kinabalu at 1:30 pm scheduled on the same day. However, Peter was persuaded by Tun Fuad to fly back to Kota Kinabalu with him because Tun Fuad wanted to discuss some matter with Peter on board the flight. Peter also cancelled the MAS flight and declined an invitation to travel in another GAF Nomad aircraft that were seated with another BERJAYA leader Datuk Harris Salleh and Sarawak chief minister Abdul Rahman Ya'kub. In April 2010, Tengku Razaleigh claimed that he was seated behind Tun Fuad while Abdul Rahman Ya'kub was seated on Tengku's right side in the Nomad aircraft when Harris Salleh came in last minute and asked Tengku to exit the aircraft in order to inspect a cattle ranch at Banggi Island. Tengku agreed and he invited Abdul Rahman to follow him. Ishak Atan, the private secretary to Tengku Razaleigh, decided to stay back with Tun Fuad's aircraft because he wanted to prepare the documents for the signing ceremony in Kota Kinabalu. Tun Fuad's aircraft took off first followed by Harris's aircraft. Tun Fuad's aircraft also carried heavy goods from the duty-free port of Labuan such as golf equipment and colour television sets. Nomad aircraft were not fitted with flight data recorders to record all its course changes and altitudes at that time.

However, Tengku Razaleigh gave a different account of the last minute events in the book titled "The Sabahan: The Life and Death of Tun Fuad Stephens" which was published back in 1999. Tengku claimed that he met Harris Salleh at the beach near the Layang-Layang village when the latter asked him to go to Banggi Island to inspect a cattle ranch. Tengku Razaleigh agreed and went to the Labuan airport. Tengku then climbed into the Tun Fuad's aircraft and asked Abdul Rahman to accompany him to Banggi Island.

According to Borneo Bulletin newspaper published on 12 June 1976, Tun Fuad's son, Johari Stephens (a 24-year-old trainee pilot) asked if he could ride the aircraft in the co-pilot seat. The request was granted and the aircraft took off from Labuan. The flight from Labuan to Kota Kinabalu usually takes around 40 minutes. Tun Fuad's aircraft should have landed at 3:30 pm at the Kota Kinabalu Airport. The weather was good and the VIP aircraft should have received immediate clearance for landing. However, the aircraft circled and approached the airport from the north. It was claimed that the ground control tower instructed the aircraft to make another turn because of an inbound Malaysia Airlines Boeing 737 flight to the airport. An airport official claimed that there were conflicting instructions from the ground control tower.

== Crash ==
George Jomiton Mojuntin (October 19, 1932 – March 11, 1983), the eldest son of the Mojuntin family, was one of the eyewitnesses of the crash. He and his friends were playing golf nearby at the Kinabalu Golf Club in Tanjung Aru when the aircraft crashed into the South China Sea while it was trying to land at Kota Kinabalu International Airport. The aircraft's altitude was at 600 feet, flying at 86 knots and approaching the runway from the north when it seemed to stall mid-air with one wing dipping down and the aircraft spiraling one and a half turns into shallow waters just three feet deep. It was 3:41 pm and 27 seconds. The residents of Kampung Sembulan Baru reported that they heard an explosion at about 3:30 pm. On rushing out from their homes, they saw the aircraft broken into two, with the cockpit embedded about three feet into a sandbank. Other parts of the aircraft were embedded in the shallow water while part of it was exposed above water. According to The Far Eastern Economic Review the aircraft had appeared to be veering from side to side before it went into a spiral and crashed.

The aircraft was a total wreck. Blood was seeping from the wrecked aircraft and stained the surrounding water crimson. The crash scene was just 50 feet from the nearest houses of the village of Kampung Sembulan Baru which the aircraft had just flown over and 3 km from the airport. Tun Fuad's brother Ben Stephens and Police Commissioner Yusof Khan were among the earliest to arrive at the scene. The Police Commissioner cut open the aircraft. Among the first items found floating at the crash scene were Tun Fuad's white shoes. Ben Stephens and the Police Commissioner managed to pull out the remains of Corporal Said, Tun Fuad's bodyguard, who had been seated at the back of the aircraft. Police Commissioner Yusof Khan recalled:

There were bodies all over the floor of the plane..., they were mangled in different ways. Tun Fuad was sprawled grotesquely, his limbs at an odd angle to his body. I recognised him by his size. Peter Mojuntin had his face untouched and there was only a bloody hole in the back of his head. The smell of blood was terrible and my chaps were at the point of fainting, but we managed to get the bodies out of the plane and lined up near to it so that we could make a quick identification. There were no survivors. I was horrifed to see that almost every BERJAYA senior leader was there. Only Harris was missing.

— Police Commissioner Yusof Khan on 6 June 1976

All the bodies were converged in the cockpit area except for one that was still strapped into position by a seat belt. The cockpit was buried into the ground. Captain Nathan was found in the pilot's seat while Johari Stephens (Tun Fuad's son) was found in the co-pilot's seat. All the bodies were mutilated beyond recognition except for Peter Mojuntin, whose face remained intact. A severed head was found located at a distance from the body. One eyewitness described the condition of the deceased as "bodies turned to jelly with practically every bone in their bodies broken or smashed".

Firemen were the first to arrive at the scene. Police arrived soon after and sealed off the area. Axes had to be used to cut open the aircraft and 11 bodies were removed. Two revolvers, five watches and RM 6,000 in cash were also recovered. All the remains were sent to Queen Elizabeth Hospital for reconstruction. Doctors worked for more than 6 hours to stitch up the body parts. Ben Stephens and Tengku Razaleigh then arrived at the mortuary for formal identification of the bodies.

== Passengers and crew ==
The crash killed all 11 on board the flight, including five ministers,

- Tun Fuad Stephens, Chief Minister of Sabah
- Datuk Peter Mojuntin, Sabah Minister of Local Government and Housing
- Datuk Chong Thien Vun, Sabah communications and public works minister
- Datuk Salleh Sulong, Sabah finance minister
- Datuk Darius Binion, deputy chief minister's assistant
- Datuk Wahid Peter Andu, Sabah finance minister's permanent secretary
- Dr Syed Hussein Wafa, Sabah's economic planning unit director
- Ishak Atan, Malaysia's finance minister's private secretary
- Corporal Said Mohammad, Tun Fuad's bodyguard
- Johari Fuad Stephens, Tun Fuad's son
- Gandhi J. Nathan, pilot

== Subsequent events ==
The aircraft crash created a vacuum in BERJAYA party leadership. It also created five vacant Sabah state assembly seats where by-elections would be held on 31 July 1976 with nomination day on 15 July. On 21 June 1976, Barisan Nasional accepted the applications from BERJAYA and USNO to join the coalition. USNO had agreed not to contest in the by-elections, leaving BERJAYA to face the competitions by candidates representing independents as well as rival parties namely the Sabah Chinese Association (SCA), BERSATU and PEKEMAS. Tun Fuad's untimely death made his wife Rahimah Stephens widowed prematurely and 4 surviving children who were still studying in Australia at that time fatherless, for he was also survived by his 78-year old elderly widowed mother, Edith Cope-Stephens (born 1898), who outlived him by a few months. The federal and state governments then immediately launched a full-scale investigation on the cause of the aircraft crash. The investigation team was led by Colonel Osman Saman, consisting of officers from the Civil Aviation Department, the Royal Malaysian Air Force, the Royal Malaysian Police and other associated departments. Government sources at that time mentioned that it was abnormal for the aircraft to take a spin before crashing into the sea. Therefore, foul play was suspected and the aircraft could have been tampered with before it took off from Labuan airport.

At 6:00 pm on the same day, the then-deputy chief minister of Sabah, Datuk Harris Salleh, choking with emotions, broke the news to the nation. He said that:

Tun Fuad and his party were returning to Kota Kinabalu from Labuan when Sabah Air Nomad Aircraft, coming to land at the airport, spun and crashed. The aircraft broke into several pieces. The cause of the accident is not yet known.

— Datuk Harris Salleh on 6 June 1976

Harris was still grieving and was reluctant to assume the post of chief minister. However, after Tengku Razaleigh's persuasions, Harris was sworn in as the sixth chief minister of Sabah just before midnight on the same day in accordance with the provisions of the state's constitution as well as order of succession to the leadership.

Government insisted on state funerals for the dead state leaders. However, problems arose because the deceased leaders were of different religions, including that of Tun Fuad, who himself was Muslim (along with Datuk Salleh Sulong, his son Johari, State Finance Ministry permanent secretary, Datuk Wahid Peter Andu, Dr Syed Hussin Wafa, Ishak Atan and Corporal Said Mohammad), whilst Datuk Peter Mojuntin and Datuk Darius Binion were both Catholics, others such as Datuk Chong Thien Vun was an Anglican. It was later decided that all the state leaders' coffins will be gathered inside the Kota Kinabalu Community Centre. After that, the leaders' coffins will left the building in a single file and break off in different directions to various cemeteries. Peter Mojuntin's body was carried back to his home at Kampung Hungab, Penampang. Peter's body was later escorted to the community centre. Tun Fuad's body was also sent to the same community centre. Peter's body was later brought to St Michael's church, Donggongon for the last rites at 2:45 pm. A Requiem mass was held. After the mass, Peter's coffin was opened for the last time for the public (whilst Datuk Darius' remains was brought to his home village of Kampung Navahiu, Putatan, Penampang and later the nearby Holy Nativity Church, located in Kampung Terawi, Putatan, also in Penampang for requiem mass, which was then an outstation parish church of St. Michael's, today it is a parish of its own right since 2011 in the Archdiocese of Kota Kinabalu within the Penampang district, dedicated by Archbishop Datuk John Lee at that time). Their respective coffins were buried later on the same day (Peter was buried in St. Michael's churchyard, whilst Darius was buried possibly either in the village cemetery of Kampung Navahiu or at the St. Joseph's Benevolent Fund Catholic Cemetery in Kampung Dontozidon off Old Penampang Road). Tun Fuad's body was later buried at the Sabah state mosque. A public holiday was declared on 7 June 1976 and flags were flown at half mast by the state and federal government departments as well as in commercial premises and private houses.

One week later on 14 June 1976, Harris Salleh signed the 5% oil royalty agreement. Harris said that he signed the 5% oil agreement on attorney-general's recommendations and agreements by all of his cabinet ministers. Besides, the chief minister from the neighbouring state of Sarawak Abdul Rahman Ya'kub had also signed the agreement after an extensive discussion with Tengku Razaleigh. However, Harris was unsure whether the quantum of 5% was determined by law or by the Malaysian parliament or the federal government.

Harris also delivered a eulogy in the Sabah State Legislative Assembly:

...The glory of this House is diminished by their absence but their spirit, the New Spirit of Sabah, lives on.

— Datuk Harris Salleh on 14 June 1976.

Harris later admitted that he found himself being pushed around by the federal government and he was too young to stand up against its demands. However, if Tun Fuad was still alive, he may have been able to stand up against it because he was more senior and had the respect of the federal government.

== Investigation results ==
Australian GAF Nomad aircraft manufacturer decided to launch an investigation in order to prove that the crash was not due to a mechanical defect. The company sent its chief pilot, Stuart Pearce, and chief designer David Hooper, to investigate the crash. They were also accompanied by two Australian Department of Transport Officials. The Australian Department of Transport had previously issued the aircraft's certificate of airworthiness. On 28 October 1976, 4.5 months after the tragedy, the investigations were over. The full investigation findings were not immediately made public. Deputy Communications Minister, Enche Mohd Ali bin M Sharif instead made a statement about the investigation findings:

The findings of an investigating team did not reveal any technical errors or sabotage as being the causes of the air crash. What they have instead discovered is that the fault was due to human error. It was also revealed that the aircraft's storage space at the back of the aircraft, was loaded with goods above the maximum load. As a consequence this had resulted in the aircraft losing control when it attempted to land at the Kota Kinabalu Airport, thus resulting in the accident.

— Mohd Ali's statement in 1976

On 22 June 1976, Australian Broadcasting Corporation announced the findings from the GAF investigations, which determined that the cause of the accident was due to pilot error; however, additional details was not released by them. The Australian investigation report remained classified since then. The report titled "G. Bennett - Sabah Air Nomad - Report by Government Aircraft Factories (GAF) investigation team on a crash of Nomad aircraft in Malaysia 9M - ATZ on 6 June 1976" was hosted at National Archives of Australia under Series no: B5535 and restriction number of 33(1)(a) because "Malaysia has not as yet publicly released their final and full report of the investigation". In 2017, the Sabah Barisan Nasional chief minister Musa Aman, in a question-and-answer session in the state assembly, said that the reports are still classified because "Sabah Civil Aviation Department has no new information on the crash". In 2019, the Pakatan Harapan chief minister Shafie Apdal left the decision to declassify the report to relevant authorities. Sabah chief minister Hajiji Noor made a similar statement to Shafie Apdal in 2020 regarding declassification of the report.

On 11 July 2022, former Chief Minister of Sabah Harris Salleh filed a judicial review to declassify the Malaysian investigation report, citing Articles 8 and 10 of the Constitution of Malaysia and Section 2C of the Official Secrets Act 1972. On 8 March 2023, the High Court of Kota Kinabalu ordered the federal government to declassify the final investigations report of the plane crash in three months. Initially, the Attorney General's Chamber (AGC) filed an appeal; however Prime Minister Anwar Ibrahim later announced on 5 April that the federal government had agreed to declassify the final investigation report. He further added that the Ministry of Transport (MOF) would be tasked to release the report. He explained the decision was based on the "interests of the families of the victims and the people of Sabah". The investigation report was finally released on 12 April 2023, 47 years after its creation. The report revealed that the center of gravity was at the back of the plane due to heavy weights and that the pilot probably failed to recover the plane from the stall due to fatigue (tiredness or exhaustion).

Harris also filed a request to National Archives of Australia in May 2022 to declassify the B5535 report through a law firm named Messr Jayasuriya Kah & Co. On 24 April 2023, Australia's Administrative Appeals Tribunal agreed to release the report to the law firm. The report was released on 26 April 2023, which supports the findings of the Malaysian investigation report.

== Causes ==
Aircraft overloading – If the Nomad aircraft is not operated within strict weight limit, it will behave unpredictably when the speed is low, especially when the aircraft is landing. This fact had not been mentioned in the flight manual during the time when Double Six Crash occurred. Since the aircraft was carrying heavy goods when it was landing at the Kota Kinabalu Airport at a low altitude (600 feet), the pilot would not have to time to respond and maneuver the aircraft out from the spin and perform an emergency landing. The tail of the aircraft contained 147.4 kg of goods, which exceeded the maximum allowed weight of 87.8 kg; although the overall weight of the plane was less than the maximum allowed weight of 197.3 kg.

Pilot error – Captain Nathan may have allowed the eldest son of Tun Fuad, Johari Stephen, who was also a trainee pilot, to control the aircraft. This was suspected because Johari's body was found in the co-pilot seat. The aircraft may have gone into a spin when Johari tried to pull the heavily loaded aircraft too steeply out of his landing approach. However, the opposite is equally likely. Captain Nathan, with many years of flying experience, could easily pull the aircraft out of a spin and save the aircraft from a deadly crash. However, in 2004, both Toh Puan Hajjah Rahimah Stephens (wife of Tun Fuad) and Datuk Harris Salleh agreed that "pilot error" was the main cause of the crash. Captain Nathan had a valid flying license for this type of aircraft, but had a history of poor training record. For example, the captain did not follow standard operating procedures for VVIP before flying the aircraft. Besides, his flying logbook was poorly maintained. The company, Sabah Air, did not strictly enforce aircraft operating procedures on its pilots. The newly formed Sabah Air company was operating "illegally" in technical terms because its draft of the operation manual was not yet approved by the Malaysian Civil Aviation Department at that time.

== Four Corners TV series exposé ==
Design flaw of the aircraft – This is the second Nomad aircraft crash following the first crash on 3 October 1973 when the aircraft was leased to Royal Australian Air Force (RAAF) as A18-002 in July 1973. The 3rd Nomad aircraft crash occurred on 6 August 1976 during a test flight at Avalon Airport, Australia, exactly 2 months after the Malaysian Double Six Crash. In November 1995, 20 years after the Double Six Crash, the Four Corners TV series of the Australian Broadcasting Corporation (ABC), which is noted for its investigative exposés, ran a programme on the dangers of Nomad aircraft which had been suppressed over the years. At the time when the programme was broadcast, there were a total of 19 Nomad accidents with 56 deaths. It was the aircraft crash flown by Glen Donovan on 12 March 1990 that caused a mutiny among Australian army pilots and the usage of all military Nomads were discontinued after that. Harry Bradford was a former RAAF test pilot. He found controllability issues of the aircraft especially during its handling on approach and landing. However, his reports were being suppressed because it could harm the reputation GAF and Australian national interests. A former GAF design engineer, Paul Hughes, bought 16 Nomad aircraft through his own corporation. However, soon after that, he filed a legal suit against Nomad for a number of aircraft defects such as a defective tail design and maximum weight limit that the aircraft can carry which was far lower than advertised weight limit. The Australian government finally paid A$ 4 million to Hughes Corporation. Hughes then disposed of 15 out of 16 aircraft that he had bought. Tun Fuad's family believed that the aircraft's faulty design was a more likely cause of the Double Six Crash back in 1999.

== Aftermath ==
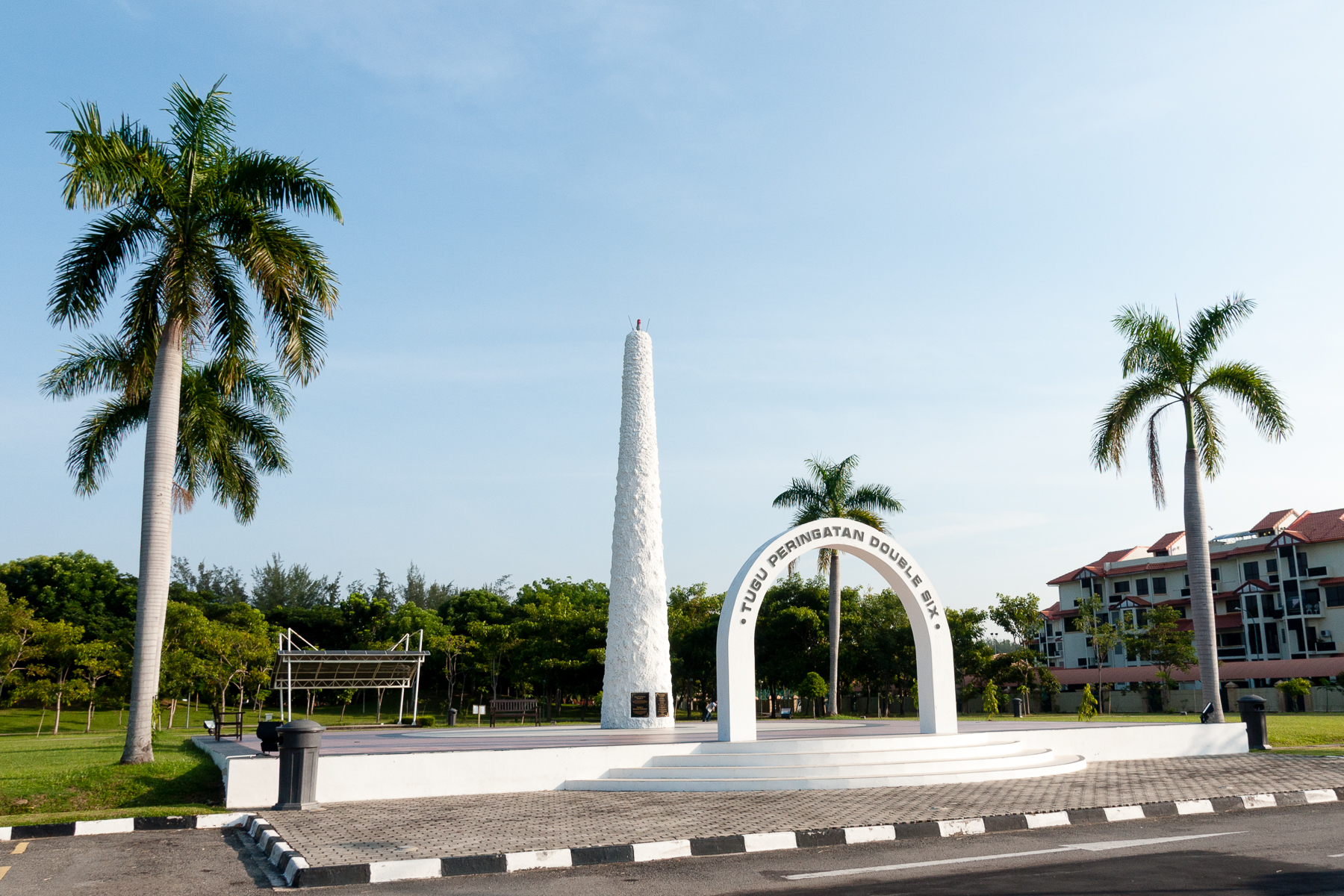
A monument erected at the site of the crash in Sembulan as a remembrance to all victims who perished in the tragedy.

A monument known as the Double Six Monument was later built at the crash site in order to commemorate the tragedy.

Malaysian Home Ministry banned the book titled Peter J Mojuntin – The Golden Son of The Kadazan as soon as it was published in May 1978. The book contains detailed description of events happened before, during, and after the aircraft crash. The ban has not been lifted since then in order to ensure "public safety as the book was very critical of the federal government". Since 2010, various quarters have been seeking to lift the ban on the book. In May 2024, former chief minister Tan Sri Joseph Pairin Kitingan had expressed his hopes to Prime Minister Datuk Seri Anwar Ibrahim to consider lifting the ban on the book on the closing of the state-level Kaamatan Festival.

In July 2010, former Sabah chief minister Harris Salleh filed a defamation suit against another former Sabah chief minister Yong Teck Lee following claims that Tengku Razaleigh Hamzah (former Petronas chairman) did not board the ill-fated flight when Harris asked Razaleigh to join him for another flight to Banggi Island to inspect a cattle farm. Yong had called for a new investigation in the case in order to find the exact cause of the aircraft crash. On 28 February 2012, Sabah High Court ruled that Yong had "crossed the line" by using the words "crime" and "assassination" against Harris Salleh. Yong was ordered to pay RM 1 million in damages to Harris. However, on 19 November 2013, Court of Appeal ordered Harris to refund the entire amount of damages back to Yong. On 26 September 2017, the Federal Court of Malaysia ordered Yong to compensate Harris RM 600,000 because Yong implicated Harris of having "blood on his hands" despite having no proof of backing up his statement.

In June 2022, the Daily Express, a newspaper based in Sabah, published a documentary detailing events of the crash incident. In June 2024, chairman of NGO Sunduvan Sabah, Aloysius Danim Siap said the group wants the younger generation to learn how the Double Six crash changed the state's political landscape.
