= United Pasok Momogun Organisation =

United Pasok Momogun Organisation Pertubuhan Pasok Momogun Bersatu
- Abbreviation: Pasok Momogun / UPMO
- Leader: G.S. Sundang
- Founder: G.S. Sundang
- Founded: January 1962
- Dissolved: May 1964
- Merger of: Reunite back with UNKO to form UPKO (May 1964)
- Split from: United National Kadazan Organisation (UNKO)
- Succeeded by: United Pasokmomogun Kadazan Organisation (UPKO)
- Headquarters: Sabah

United Pasok Momogun Organisation (Malay: Pertubuhan Pasok Momogun Bersatu; abbrev:Pasok Momogun or UPMO) is an ethnically-based political party in North Borneo (later Sabah, Malaysia). It was a splinter party of United National Kadazan Organisation (UNKO); founded by Donald Stephens earlier in 1961. The breakaway UPMO formed by Orang Kaya Kaya (OKK) Datuk G.S. Sundang, in January 1962 to fight for the interest of Kadazan-Dusun-Murut (KDM) races; with the supports and encouragement of the Chinese in Sabah. The split was in reaction and protest to the suggestion of the Prime Minister of Malaya, Tunku Abdul Rahman to create a new federation country named Malaysia, dubbed Projek Malaysia.

In May 1964, UPMO eventually reunited with its parent party UNKO which had earlier entered into a coalition with the United Sabah National Organisation (USNO) and the Sabah Chinese Association (SCA) to form a new consociationalism Government of Sabah with Stephens became the state's first Chief Minister, upon the successful formation of Malaysia in 1963,. With the reunification of UPMO back into UNKO had renamed itself as United Pasokmomogun Kadazan Organisation (UPKO) in June 1964.

== General election results ==
Election	Total seats won	Total votes	Share of votes	Outcome of election	Election leader
1964	1 / 159	appointed by Legislative Assembly		▲1 seat; Opposition	G.S. Sundang

== See also ==
- Politics of Malaysia
- List of political parties in Malaysia
- United Pasokmomogun Kadazan Organisation (UPKO) (Old)
