= United Pasokmomogun Kadazan Organisation =

United Pasokmomogun Kadazan Organisation Pertubuhan Pasok-Momogun Kadazan Bersatu
- Abbreviation: UPKO
- Leader: Fuad Stephens
- Founder: Fuad Stephens
- Founded: June 1964
- Dissolved: 28 December 1967
- Merger of: United Pasok Momogun Organisation (UPMO); United National Kadazan Organisation (UNKO)
- Preceded by: United National Kadazan Organisation (UNKO) - 1961
- Merged into: United Sabah National Organisation (USNO) - 1967
- National affiliation: Sabah Alliance (1963-1967)

The United Pasokmomogun Kadazan Organisation (Malay: Pertubuhan Pasok-Momogun Kadazan Bersatu; abbrev: UPKO) was a Kadazan-Dusun-Murut (KDM) based political party in North Borneo and later Sabah at the time it became a state of Malaysia in the 1960s.

== History ==
=== Formation of United National Kadazan Organisation (1961) ===
The party was initially started as the United National Kadazan Organisation (UNKO) which was founded by Donald Stephens and Peter Joinod Mojuntin in 1961, with its core constituency of indigenous Sabahans. UNKO modeled after United Malays National Organisation (UMNO) in Malaya; was the first indigenous party in Sabah formed to represent the interests of the Kadazandusun community in Sabah. At the time of its founding it had approximately 20,000 members.

=== Breakaway of United Pasok Momogun Organisation (1962) ===
The new party UNKO has members which does not support the "Malaysia project" and disagrees with Donald Stephens, hence they split to form a new group led by G. S. Sundang going on to form the United Pasok Momogun Organisation (UPMO) in January 1962.

=== Reunification and formation of United Pasokmomogun Kadazan Organisation (1963-1964) ===
Upon the formation of Malaysia in 1963, UNKO entered into a Sabah Alliance coalition with the United Sabah National Organisation (USNO), a Muslim party, and the Sabah Chinese Association (SCA) to form a consociationalism new Government of Sabah; with its president Stephens became the state's first Chief Minister. In May 1964, the breakaway UPMO party, eventually reunited with its parent party. The merger saw UNKO renamed itself as the United Pasokmomogun Kadazan Organisation (UPKO) in June 1964.

=== Dissolution and merger into United Sabah National Organisation (1967) ===
After Stephens was forced out of the chief ministership in 1964 and became a federal minister., the party was dissolved on 28 December 1967 and absorbed into United Sabah National Organisation (USNO).

== Government offices ==
=== State governments ===
- Sabah (1963–1964)

Note: bold as Chief Minister, italic as junior partner

== General election results ==
Election	Total seats won	Seats contested	Total votes	Share of votes	Outcome of election	Election leader
1964 (UNKO)	5 / 159	13		appointed by Legislative Assembly	▲5 seats; Governing coalition (Alliance Party)	Donald Stephens

== State election results ==
Sabah State Legislative Assembly
Election	Votes		Seats			Position (Note: As part of electoral coalition.)	Status
Election	Count	%	Result	Won / contested	+/–	Position	Status
1967	64,767	40.8	12 / 32	12 / 24	▲12	▲1st (Sabah Alliance) (Note: UPKO contested on its own against other Alliance members)	Alliance

== See also ==
- Politics of Malaysia
- List of political parties in Malaysia
- Sabah Democratic Party (PDS)
- United Pasokmomogun Kadazandusun Murut Organisation (UPKO) (New)
