= Sabah State Legislative Assembly =

Legislative branch of the Sabah state government

Sabah State Legislative Assembly Dewan Undangan Negeri Sabah
- 17th Assembly
- Insignia of Sabah State Legislative Assembly: azure, a mace in pale proper between the numbers 19 in dexter and 63 in sinister and in base the letters SABAH sable.

Type
- Type: Unicameral

History
- Founded: 1963 as Majlis Undangan; 25 September 1976 as Dewan Undangan Negeri

Leadership
- Yang di-Pertua Negeri: Musa Aman since 1 January 2025
- Speaker: Kadzim M. Yahya, BN–UMNO since 8 October 2020
- Deputy Speaker I: Al Hambra Juhar, Independent since 19 June 2023
- Deputy Speaker II: Richard Yong We Kong, SAPP since 19 June 2023
- Chief Minister: Hajiji Noor, GRS–GAGASAN since 29 September 2020
- Deputy Chief Minister: Joachim Gunsalam, GRS–PBS since 1 December 2025
- Deputy Chief Minister: Masidi Manjun, GRS–GAGASAN since 1 December 2025
- Deputy Chief Minister: Ewon Benedick, GRS–UPKO since 1 December 2025
- Opposition Leader: Shafie Apdal, WARISAN since 29 September 2020
- Secretary and Deputy Secretary: Rafidah binti Maqbool Rahman (Secretary); Mohd Jayreh bin Jaya (Deputy Secretary)

Structure
- Seats: 73 elected and up to 6 nominated
- Political groups: As of 15 August 2026 Government (53): GRS (36); GAGASAN (25); PBS (7); UPKO (3); LDP (1); BN (6); UMNO (5); PBRS (1); PH (2); PKR (2); STAR (2); PN (1); PAS (1); Independent (6); Opposition (26): WARISAN (25); KDM (1); Speaker (1): BN (non-MLA)
- Committees: Standing Committee; Public Accounts Committee; Committee of Privileges

Elections
- Voting system: First-past-the-post
- Last election: 29 November 2025
- Next election: Before 9 February 2031

Meeting place
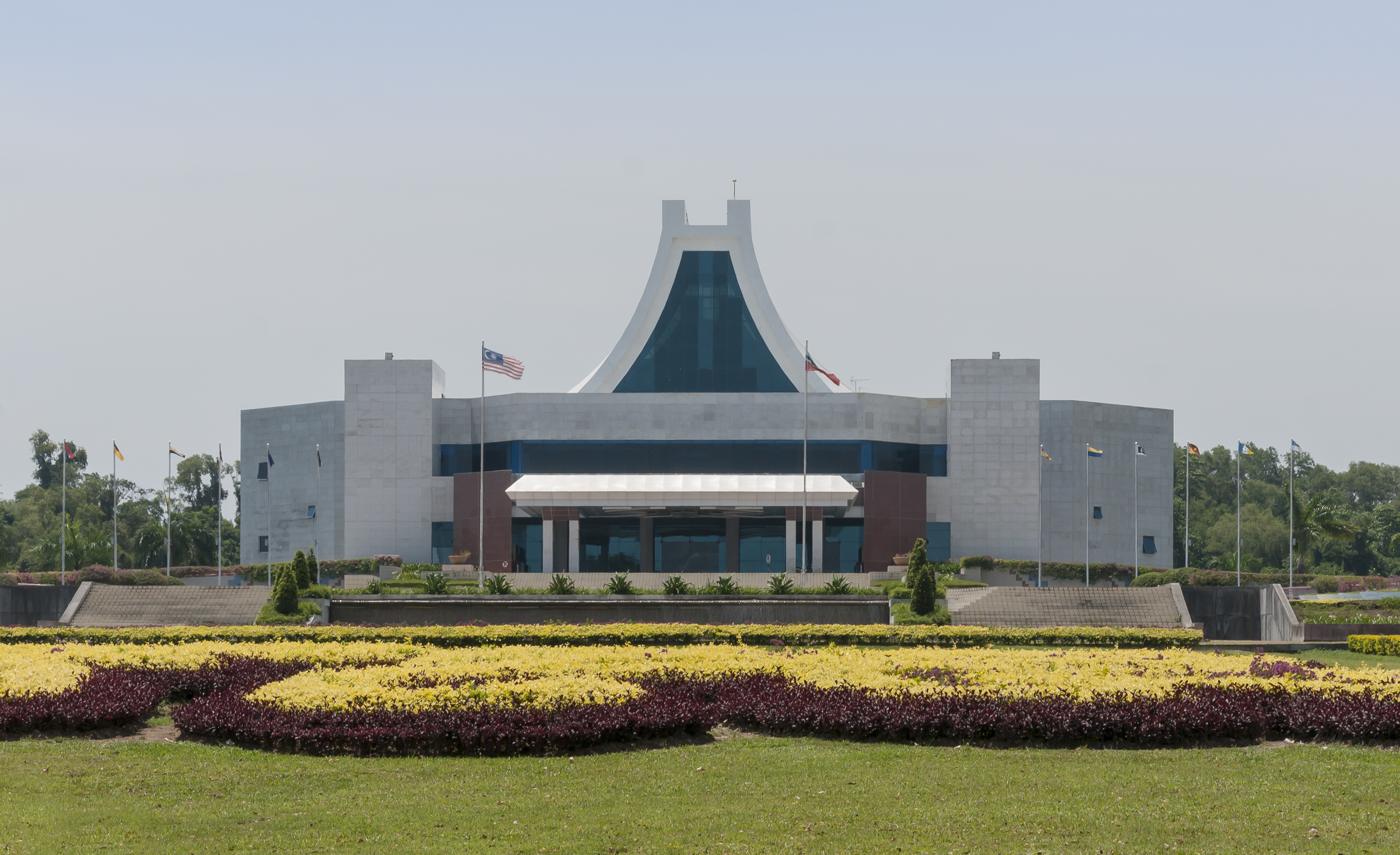
- Sabah State Legislative Assembly Building, Likas, Kota Kinabalu

Website
- dun.sabah.gov.my

Map of Sabah state constituencies (since 2020)

The Sabah State Legislative Assembly (Malay: Dewan Undangan Negeri Sabah) is a part of the legislature of Sabah, Malaysia, the other being the governor of Sabah. The assembly meets at the Sabah Legislative Assembly Building at Likas in the state capital of Kota Kinabalu.

This unicameral legislature currently has 73 seats representing state constituencies elected through a first-past-the-post electoral system across the state.

Like at the federal level in Malaysia, Sabah uses a Westminster-style parliamentary government, in which members are elected to the legislative assembly through general elections, from which the chief minister and the cabinet are appointed based on majority support. The chief minister is head of government, while the governor acts as head of state. The largest party not forming the government is known as the official opposition, its leader being recognised as leader of the opposition by the speaker.

Members of the assembly refer to themselves as "Members of the Legislative Assembly" (MLAs) and sometimes as "state assemblymen".

The most recent assembly was elected on 29 November 2025. 73 members were elected into the 17th Sabah Legislative Assembly.

== Lawmaking ==
In accordance with the traditions of the Westminster system, most laws originate with the cabinet (government bills) and are passed by the legislature after stages of debate and decision-making. Ordinary members may introduce privately (private members' bills), play an integral role in scrutinising bills in debate and committee and amending bills presented to the legislature by cabinet.

== Officeholders ==
=== Chair occupants ===
Chair occupants of the assembly are appointed by the governor on the chief minister's advice. Kadzim M. Yahya (BN-UMNO) has been the speaker since 8 October 2020. He is assisted by two Deputy Speakers, Al Hambra Juhar (Independent) and Richard Yong We Kong (SAPP) who were both appointed on 19 June 2023.

=== Chief Minister ===
The Chief Minister of Sabah is appointed by the Governor of Sabah as the MLA likely to command the confidence of the majority in the assembly. He leads the Cabinet of Sabah, which is the executive branch of the state government. Following the 2025 Sabah State Elections, YAB Datuk Seri Panglima Hajiji Noor (GAGASAN-GRS), MLA for Sulaman, was appointed for a second term as Chief Minister.

=== Leader of the Opposition ===
The Leader of the Opposition is the leader of the largest party represented in the State Assembly not forming the government. Following the 2025 Sabah State Elections, YB Datuk Seri Panglima Mohd. Shafie Apdal (WARISAN), MLA for Senallang, is likely to be appointed as the leader of the Opposition in the new legislative term.

== Officers ==
=== Speaker and Deputy Speaker ===
The Governor, on the advice of the Chief Minister, appoints one person from the membership of the Assembly or, in deviation from traditional Westminster practices, from non-members who are qualified to be elected as members of the Assembly, as the presiding officer of the Assembly, known as the Speaker, and another person from the membership of the Assembly to be Deputy Speaker. The lengths of their service are specified by the letters patent that appointed them; however, their term may end premature if they no longer qualify for the membership of the Assembly, they resign, or the Governor terminates their speakership on the advice of the Chief Minister. The Speaker is also disqualified from the chair if they have any personal interest in another organisation; the Deputy Speaker does not need to vacate their office if they have such interests, but is barred from presiding over any matter that affects their interests.

The Speaker or Deputy Speaker presides from a chair at the front of the chamber (opposite the entrance). A member who believes that a rule (or Standing Order) has been breached may raise a point of order, on which the Speaker makes a ruling that is not subject to any appeal. The Speaker may discipline members who fail to observe the rules of the Assembly. The Speaker or Deputy Speaker remain members of their respective parties while holding the speakership, but they are required by convention to act impartially while presiding over the Assembly. A Speaker or Deputy Speaker who is also an elected member of the Assembly retain voting rights, but by convention does not vote in proceedings they preside over except to break a tie, only doing so according to Speaker Denison's rule.

The following are the Speakers of the Sabah Legislative Assembly since 1963:

No.	Speaker	Term start	Term end	Party	Constituency
1	Sir George N. Oehlers	23 September 1963	22 September 1964	IND	Non-MLA
2	Haji Mohd. Kassim Haji Hashim	23 September 1964	24 September 1975		
3	Abdul Momin Haji Kalakhan	24 September 1975	10 May 1978		
4	Haji Mohd. Sunoh Marso	11 May 1978	29 March 1986	BERJAYA	Lahad Datu
4	Haji Mohd. Sunoh Marso	11 May 1978	29 March 1986	BN (BERJAYA)	Lahad Datu
5	Pandikar Amin Haji Mulia	31 March 1986	30 November 1987	BN (USNO)	Non-MLA
6	Haji Hassan Alban Sandukong	8 December 1987	4 December 2002		Non-MLA
7	Juhar bin Haji Mahiruddin	5 December 2002	31 December 2010	BN (UMNO)	Non-MLA
8	Salleh Said Keruak	31 December 2010	28 July 2015	BN (UMNO)	Non-MLA
8	Salleh Said Keruak	31 December 2010	28 July 2015	BN (UMNO)	Usukan
9	Syed Abas Syed Ali	7 August 2015	6 October 2020	BN (UMNO)	Balung
9	Syed Abas Syed Ali	7 August 2015	6 October 2020	IND	Non-MLA
10	Kadzim M Yahya	8 October 2020	Incumbent	BN (UMNO)	Non-MLA

=== Secretary and Deputy Secretary ===
The Secretary and Deputy Secretary of the Legislative Assembly are civil servants that serve as the chief advisers of procedural matters, as well as head the day-to-day administration of the Assembly. They serve a similar role to the Clerk of the House of Commons in the United Kingdom, advising the Speaker on the rules and procedure of the Assembly, signing orders and official communications, and signing and endorsing bills. They are permanent officials and not members of the Assembly. The Governor has the sole power to appoint or remove them.

=== Other officers ===
The Serjeant-at-Arms maintains the law, order and security of the Assembly, within the chamber and on the premises of the Assembly building. The Serjeant-at-Arms also carries the ceremonial mace, a symbol of the authority of the Governor and of the Legislative Assembly, into the chamber each day in front of the Speaker, and the mace is laid upon the Table of the Assembly during sittings.

== Committees ==
The Legislative Assembly uses committees for a variety of purposes, e.g. for the review of bills. Committees consider bills in detail, and may make amendments. Bills of great constitutional importance, as well as some important financial measures, are usually committed to the Committee of the Whole House, a body that includes all members of the Assembly. This committee sits in the main chamber itself.

Committees can also be created for any purpose – these are known as Select Committees. However, the Select Committees of the Assembly primarily handle administrative matters of the chamber. For example, the Selection and Standing Orders Committee meet to select members of other committees as well as consider changes to the Standing Orders; the Public Petitions Committee handles petitions of any matter from the public; and the Privileges Committee considers questions of parliamentary privilege, as well as matters relating to the conduct of the members. Committees need to be re-established at the beginning of each term.

== List of Assemblies ==
Current composition by party

Assembly	Term began	Members	Cabinet	Governing parties
2nd	1963	25	Fuad Stephens I (1963–1964)	Sabah Alliance (UNKO–USNO–SCA–UPMO) (1963–1964); Sabah Alliance (UPKO–USNO–SCA) (1964)
2nd	1963	25	Peter Lo Su Yin (1965–1967)	Sabah Alliance (SCA–USNO)
3rd	1967	32	Mustapha I	Sabah Alliance (USNO–SCA)
4th	1971	32	Mustapha II (1971–1975)	Sabah Alliance (USNO–SCA) (1971–1974)
4th	1971	32	Mustapha II (1971–1975)	BN (USNO–SCA) (1974–1975)
4th	1971	32	Mohammad Said (1975–1976)	Sabah Alliance (USNO–SCA)
5th	1976	48	Fuad Stephens II (1976)	BERJAYA
5th	1976	48	Haris I (1976–1981)	BN (BERJAYA)
6th	1981	48	Haris II	BN (BERJAYA)
7th	1985	48	Pairin I	PBS–PASOK
8th	1986	48	Pairin II	BN (PBS)
9th	1990	48	Pairin III	BN (PBS) (1990)
9th	1990	48	Pairin III	GR (PBS) (1990–1993); PBS–USNO (1993–1994)
10th	1994	48	Pairin IV (1994)	PBS
10th	1994	48	Sakaran (1994); Md Salleh (1994–1996); Yong Teck Lee (1996–1998); Bernard Dompok (1998–1999)	BN (UMNO–PDS–SAPP–AKAR–PBRS–LDP–MCA) (1994–1995); BN (UMNO–PDS–SAPP–AKAR–PBRS–GERAKAN–MCA) (1995–1996); BN (UMNO–PDS–SAPP–AKAR–PBRS–MCA) (1996–1999)
11th	1999	48	Osu (1999–2001); Chong Kah Kiat (2001–2003); Musa I (2003–2004)	BN (UMNO–SAPP–UPKO–LDP) (1999–2003); BN (UMNO–PBS–SAPP–UPKO–LDP) (2003–2004)
12th	2004	60	Musa II	BN (UMNO–PBS–UPKO–SAPP–LDP–PBRS–MCA)
13th	2008	60	Musa III	BN (UMNO–PBS–UPKO–SAPP–LDP–PBRS–MCA) (2008); BN (UMNO–PBS–UPKO–GERAKAN–LDP–PBRS–MCA) (2008–2013)
14th	2013	60	Musa IV	BN (UMNO–PBS–UPKO–LDP–GERAKAN–PBRS) (2013–2015); BN (UMNO–PBS–UPKO–LDP–GERAKAN–PBRS–MCA) (2015–2018)
15th	2018	60	Musa V (2018)	BN (UMNO–PBS–UPKO–PBRS)–STAR
15th	2018	60	Shafie (2018-2020)	Warisan–PH (PKR–DAP)–UPKO (2018–2019); Warisan–PH (PKR–BERSATU–DAP)–UPKO (2019–2020); Warisan–PH (PKR–DAP)–UPKO (2020)
16th	2020	73	Hajiji I	PN (BERSATU–STAR–SAPP–PAS)–BN (UMNO)–PBS (September 2020–March 2022); GRS (BERSATU–PBS–STAR–SAPP)–BN (UMNO)–PN (PAS)–KDM–PHRS–PBM (March–December 2022); GRS (PBS–STAR–SAPP)–BN (UMNO)–PH (UPKO–DAP–PKR)–PN (PAS)–KDM–PHRS–PBM (December 2022–January 2023); GRS (GAGASAN–PBS–STAR–SAPP–PHRS)–PH (UPKO–DAP–PKR)–PN (PAS)–KDM (January 2023–October 2025)
17th	2025	73	Hajiji II	GRS (GAGASAN–PBS–LDP)–BN (UMNO–PBRS)–UPKO–PH (PKR)–STAR–KDM–PN (PAS) (December 2025–June 2026); GRS (GAGASAN–PBS–UPKO–LDP)–BN (UMNO–PBRS)–PH (PKR)–STAR–KDM–PN (PAS) (June 2026–August 2026); GRS (GAGASAN–PBS–UPKO–LDP)–BN (UMNO–PBRS)–PH (PKR)–STAR–PN (PAS) (August 2026–present)

== See also ==
- Cabinet of Sabah
