= List of state by-elections in Malaysia =

Casual vacancies in the Dewan Undangan Negeri (state legislative assembly) are filled by by-elections, which may occur when a member of the Dewan Undangan Negeri dies, resigns or for some other reason. Members of the Dewan Undangan Negeri normally tender the resignation to the Speaker. The Speaker has a discretion as to when to call a by-election and may not call one at all, for example, if a general election or a state election is imminent.

Brackets around a date indicate that the candidate was unopposed when nominations closed. These candidates were declared "elected unopposed" with effect from the date of the closing of nominations, and there was no need to hold a by-election.

== 2022–present ==
| By-election | State Assembly | Date | Incumbent | Party | Winner | Party | Cause |
|---|---|---|---|---|---|---|---|
| Mata Ayer | Perlis | Cancelled | Wan Badariah Wan Saad | PN (PAS) | —N/a | | Death (thyroid disease) |
| Chuping | Perlis | Cancelled | Saad Seman | PN (PAS) | —N/a | | Declared vacant by the Speaker due to change of party allegiance. However, SPR did not hold a by-election. (2025 Perlis political crisis) |
| Bintong | Perlis | Cancelled | Fakhrul Anwar Ismail | PN (PAS) | —N/a | | Declared vacant by the Speaker due to change of party allegiance. However, SPR did not hold a by-election. (2025 Perlis political crisis) |
| Guar Sanji | Perlis | Cancelled | Mohd Ridzuan Hashim | PN (PAS) | —N/a | | Declared vacant by the Speaker due to change of party allegiance. However, SPR did not hold a by-election. (2025 Perlis political crisis) |
| Lamag | Sabah | 24 January 2026 | Bung Moktar Radin | BN (UMNO) | Mohd Ismail Ayob | BN (UMNO) | Death (kidney failure and lung infection) |
| Melalap | Sabah | Cancelled | Peter Anthony | KDM | —N/a | | Disqualification (sentenced to jail for falsying documents) |
| Ayer Kuning | Perak | 26 April 2025 | Ishsam Shahruddin | BN (UMNO) | Mohamad Yusri Bakir | BN (UMNO) | Death (acute coronary syndrome) |
| Sungai Sibuga | Sabah | Cancelled | Mohamad Hamsan Awang Supain | BN (UMNO) | —N/a | | Death (kidney complications) |
| Mahkota | Johor | 28 September 2024 | Sharifah Azizah Syed Zain | BN (UMNO) | Syed Hussein Syed Abdullah | BN (UMNO) | Death (internal bleeding) |
| Nenggiri | Kelantan | 17 August 2024 | Mohd Azizi Abu Naim | PN (BERSATU) | Mohd Azmawi Fikri Abdul Ghani | BN (UMNO) | Disqualification (change of political allegiance) |
| Sungai Bakap | Penang | 6 July 2024 | Nor Zamri Latiff | PN (PAS) | Abidin Ismail | PN (PAS) | Death (inflammation of stomach) |
| Kuala Kubu Baharu | Selangor | 11 May 2024 | Lee Kee Hiong | PH (DAP) | Pang Sock Tao | PH (DAP) | Death (ovarian cancer) |
| Jepak | Sarawak | 4 November 2023 | Talib Zulpilip | GPS (PBB) | Iskandar Turkee | GPS (PBB) | Death (kidney complications) |
| Pelangai | Pahang | 7 October 2023 | Johari Harun | BN (UMNO) | Amizar Abu Adam | BN (UMNO) | Death (plane crash) in Elmina, Selangor. |
| Simpang Jeram | Johor | 9 September 2023 | Salahuddin Ayub | PH (AMANAH) | Nazri Abdul Rahman | PH (AMANAH) | Death (brain hemorrhage) |
| Belantek | Kedah | Cancelled | Mohd Isa Shafie | PN (PAS) | —N/a | | Death (Pneumonia, Endocarditis and Pyelonephritis). However, SPR did not hold a by-election. |
| Bertam | Penang | Cancelled | Khaliq Mehtab Mohd Ishaq | PN (BERSATU) | —N/a | | Declared vacant by the Speaker due to change of party allegiance. However, SPR did not hold a by-election. |
| Seberang Jaya | Penang | Cancelled | Afif Bahardin | PN (BERSATU) | —N/a | | Declared vacant by the Speaker due to change of party allegiance. However, SPR did not hold a by-election. |
| Sungai Acheh | Penang | Cancelled | Zulkifli Ibrahim | PN (BERSATU) | —N/a | | Declared vacant by the Speaker due to change of party allegiance. However, SPR did not hold a by-election. |
| Telok Bahang | Penang | Cancelled | Zolkifly Mohd Lazim | PN (BERSATU) | —N/a | | Declared vacant by the Speaker due to change of party allegiance. However, SPR did not hold a by-election. |
| Batang Kali | Selangor | Cancelled | Harumaini Omar | PEJUANG | —N/a | | Declared vacant by the Speaker due to long absence without the leave of the Speaker. However, SPR did not hold a by-election. |
| Gurun | Kedah | Cancelled | Johari Abdul | PH (PKR) | —N/a | | Resignation on appointment as Speaker of Dewan Rakyat. However, SPR did not hold a by-election. |
| Tioman | Pahang | 7 December 2022 | Mohd Johari Hussain | BN (UMNO) | Mohd Johari Hussain | BN (UMNO) | The election was postponed from the original date because of the death of one of the candidates after the nomination day of 2022 Pahang state election. |

== 2018–22 ==
| By-election | State Assembly | Date | Incumbent | Party | Winner | Party | Cause |
|---|---|---|---|---|---|---|---|
| Kempas | Johor | Cancelled | Osman Sapian | PN (BERSATU) | —N/a | | Death (stroke) |
| Baleh | Sarawak | Cancelled | James Jemut Masing | GPS (PRS) | —N/a | | Death (heart attack) |
| Melor | Kelantan | Cancelled | Md Yusnan Yusof | PN (PAS) | —N/a | | Death (heart attack) |
| Bugaya | Sabah | 19 November 2022 | Manis Muka Mohd Darah | WARISAN | Jamil Hamzah | WARISAN | Death (kidney ailment) |
| Slim | Perak | 29 August 2020 | Mohd. Khusairi Abdul Talib | BN (UMNO) | Mohd Zaidi Aziz | BN (UMNO) | Death (heart attack) |
| Chini | Pahang | 4 July 2020 | Abu Bakar Harun | BN (UMNO) | Mohd Sharim Md Zain | BN (UMNO) | Death (heart attack) |
| Pujut | Sarawak | Cancelled | Ting Tiong Choon | PH (DAP) | —N/a | | Declared vacant by the Federal Court based on having dual citizenship decision to declare disqualification. However, SPR did not hold a by-election. |
| Rantau | Negeri Sembilan | 13 November 2019 | Mohamad Hasan | BN (UMNO) | Mohamad Hasan | BN (UMNO) | Uncontested election nullified (Election petition) |
| Semenyih | Selangor | 2 March 2019 | Bakhtiar Mohd Nor | PH (BERSATU) | Zakaria Hanafi | BN (UMNO) | Death (heart Attack) |
| Seri Setia | Selangor | 8 September 2018 | Shaharuddin Badaruddin | PH (PKR) | Halimey Abu Bakar | PH (PKR) | Death (colon cancer) |
| Balakong | Selangor | 8 September 2018 | Eddie Ng Tien Chee | PH (DAP) | Wong Siew Ki | PH (DAP) | Death (traffic collision) |
| Sungai Kandis | Selangor | 4 August 2018 | Mat Shuhaimi Shafiei | PH (PKR) | Mohd Zawawi Ahmad Mughni | PH (PKR) | Death (lymphoma) |

== 2013–18 ==
| By-election | State Assembly | Date | Incumbent | Party | Winner | Party | Cause |
|---|---|---|---|---|---|---|---|
| Paginatan | Sabah | Cancelled | Siringan Gubat | BN (UPKO) | —N/a | | Death (heart attack) |
| Apas | Sabah | Cancelled | Tawfiq Abu Bakar Titingan | BN (UMNO) | —N/a | | Death (colon cancer) |
| Lepar | Pahang | Cancelled | Mohd. Shohaimi Jusoh | BN (UMNO) | —N/a | | Death (diabetes) |
| Lenggeng | Negeri Sembilan | Cancelled | Ishak Ismail | BN (UMNO) | —N/a | | Death (heart attack) |
| Nenggiri | Kelantan | Cancelled | Mat Yusoff Abd. Ghani | BN (UMNO) | —N/a | | Declared vacant by the Speaker based on the Insolvency Department’s decision to declare him a bankrupt. However, SPR did not hold a by-election. |
| Tungku | Sabah | Cancelled | Mohd. Suhaili Said | BN (UMNO) | —N/a | | Death (liver cancer) |
| Tanjong Datu | Sarawak | 18 February 2017 | Adenan Satem | BN (PBB) | Jamilah Anu | BN (PBB) | Death (heart attack) |
| Sungai Air Tawar | Selangor | Cancelled | Kamarol Zaki Abdul Malik | BN (UMNO) | —N/a | | Death (heart attack) |
| Chempaka | Kelantan | 22 March 2015 | Nik Abdul Aziz Nik Mat | PAS | Ahmad Fathan Mahmood | PAS | Death (prostate cancer) |
| Pengkalan Kubor | Kelantan | 25 September 2014 | Noor Zahidi Omar | BN (UMNO) | Mat Razi Mat Ail | BN (UMNO) | Death (liver cancer) |
| Bukit Assek | Sarawak | Cancelled | Wong Ho Leng | DAP | —N/a | | Death (brain cancer) |
| Balingian | Sarawak | 29 March 2014 | Abdul Taib Mahmud | BN (PBB) | Yussibnosh Balo | BN (PBB) | Resignation on appointment as Yang di-Pertua Negeri of Sarawak |
| Kajang | Selangor | 23 March 2014 | Lee Chin Cheh | PKR | Wan Azizah Wan Ismail | PKR | Resignation (Kajang Move) |
| Sungai Limau | Kedah | 4 November 2013 | Azizan Abdul Razak | PAS | Mohd Azam Abd Samat | PAS | Death (cardiac arrest) |
| Kuala Besut | Terengganu | 24 July 2013 | A. Rahman Mokhtar | BN (UMNO) | Tengku Zaihan Che Ku Abd Rahman | BN (UMNO) | Death (lung cancer) |

== 2008–13 ==
| By-election | State Assembly | Date | Incumbent | Party | Winner | Party | Cause |
|---|---|---|---|---|---|---|---|
| Chenor | Pahang | Cancelled | Tan Mohd Aminuddin Ishak | BN (UMNO) | —N/a | | Death (food poisoning) |
| Kuala Nerang | Kedah | Cancelled | Syed Sobri Syed Hashim | BN (UMNO) | —N/a | | Declared vacant by the Speaker based on the Insolvency Department's decision to declare him a bankrupt. However, SPR did not hold a by-election. |
| Johol | Negeri Sembilan | Cancelled | Roslan Mohd Yusof | BN (UMNO) | —N/a | | Death (lung) |
| Lendu | Malacca | Cancelled | Idderris Kassim | BN (UMNO) | —N/a | | Death (colon cancer) |
| Bukit Gasing | Selangor | Cancelled | Edward Lee Poh Lin | DAP | —N/a | | Death (colon cancer) |
| Merlimau | Malacca | 6 March 2011 | Mohamad Hidhir Abu Hassan | BN (UMNO) | Roslan Ahmad | BN (UMNO) | Death (heart attack) |
| Kerdau | Pahang | 6 March 2011 | Zaharuddin Abu Kassim | BN (UMNO) | Syed Ibrahim Syed Ahmad | BN (UMNO) | Death (heart attack) |
| Tenang | Johor | 30 January 2011 | Sulaiman Taha | BN (UMNO) | Mohd Azahar Ibrahim | BN (UMNO) | Death (blood infection and diabetes) |
| Galas | Kelantan | 4 November 2010 | Che Hashim Sulaiman | PAS | Ab. Aziz Yusoff | BN (UMNO) | Death (colon cancer) |
| Pelabuhan Klang | Selangor | Cancelled | Badrul Hisham Abdullah | BN (UMNO) | —N/a | | Declared vacant by the Speaker due to long absence without the leave of the Speaker. However, the Court decided there is no vacancy and SPR did not hold a by-election. |
| Kota Siputeh | Kedah | Cancelled | Abu Hasan Sarif | BN (UMNO) | —N/a | | Declared vacant by the Speaker due to long absence without the leave of the Speaker. However, the Court decided there is no vacancy and SPR did not hold a by-election. |
| Bagan Pinang | Negeri Sembilan | 11 October 2009 | Azman Mohammad Noor | BN (UMNO) | Mohd Isa Abdul Samad | BN (UMNO) | Death (sepsis) |
| Permatang Pasir | Penang | 25 August 2009 | Mohd Hamdan Abdul Rahman | PAS | Mohd Salleh Man | PAS | Death (heart attack) |
| Manek Urai | Kelantan | 14 July 2009 | Ismail Yaacob | PAS | Mohd Fauzi Abdullah | PAS | Death (heart attack) |
| Penanti | Penang | 31 May 2009 | Mohammad Fairus Khairuddin | PKR | Mansor Othman | PKR | Resignation |
| Bukit Selambau | Kedah | 7 April 2009 | Arumugam Vengatarakoo | PKR | Manikumar Subramaniam | PKR | Resignation |
| Batang Air | Sarawak | 7 April 2009 | Dublin Unting Ingkot | BN (PRS) | Malcom Mussen Lamoh | BN (PRS) | Death (stroke) |
| Behrang | Perak | Cancelled | Jamaluddin Mohd Radzi | Independent | —N/a | | Declared vacant by the Speaker due to change of party allegiance. However, SPR decided there is no vacancy and did not hold a by-election. (see:2009 Perak constitutional crisis) |
| Jelapang | Perak | Cancelled | Hee Yit Foong | Independent | —N/a | | Declared vacant by the Speaker due to change of party allegiance. However, SPR decided there is no vacancy and did not hold a by-election. (see:2009 Perak constitutional crisis) |
| Changkat Jering | Perak | Cancelled | Mohd Osman Mohd Jailu | Independent | —N/a | | Declared vacant by the Speaker due to change of party allegiance. However, SPR decided there is no vacancy and did not hold a by-election. (see:2009 Perak constitutional crisis) |
| Sanglang | Perlis | Cancelled | Abdullah Hassan | BN (UMNO) | Hashim Jasin | PAS | Election declared null and void as wrong winner has been announced. However, SPR did not hold a by-election and hand the seat to correct winner. |

== 2004–08 ==
| By-election | State | Date | Incumbent | Party | Winner | Party | Cause |
|---|---|---|---|---|---|---|---|
| Ijok | Selangor | 28 April 2007 | Sivalingam Arumugam Karuppiah | BN (MIC) | Parthiban Karuppiah | BN (MIC) | Death (heart attack) |
| Machap | Malacca | 12 April 2007 | Poh Ah Tiam | BN (MCA) | Lai Meng Chong | BN (MCA) | Death (renal failure due to lymphatic cancer) |
| Batu Talam | Pahang | 28 January 2007 | Tengku Paris Tengku Razlan | BN (UMNO) | Abdul Aziz Mat Kiram | BN (UMNO) | Death (colon cancer) |
| Pengkalan Pasir | Kelantan | 6 December 2005 | Wan Abdul Aziz Wan Jaafar | PAS | Hanafi Mamat | BN (UMNO) | Death (liver cancer) |
| Ba'kelalan | Sarawak | 18 September 2004 | Judson Sakai Tugal | BN (SNAP) | Nelson Balang Rining | BN (SPDP) | Death (helicopter crash) |
| Kuala Berang | Terengganu | 28 August 2004 | Komaruddin Ab. Rahman | BN (UMNO) | Mohamad Zawawi Ismail | BN (UMNO) | Death (heart attack) |

== 1999–04 ==
| By-election | State Assembly | Date | Incumbent | Party | Winner | Party | Cause |
|---|---|---|---|---|---|---|---|
| Anak Bukit | Kedah | 18 July 2002 | Fadzil Noor | PAS | Amiruddin Hamzah | PAS | Death (heart attack) |
| Ketari | Pahang | 31 March 2002 | Loke Koon Kam | BN (Gerakan) | Yum Ah Ha @ Yim Ah Ha | BN (Gerakan) | Death (jawbone cancer) |
| Indera Kayangan | Perlis | 19 January 2002 | Khor Lian Tee | BN (MCA) | Oui Ah Lan @ Ng Ah Lan | BN (MCA) | Death (colon cancer) |
| Likas | Sabah | 21 July 2001 | Yong Teck Lee | BN (SAPP) | Yong Teck Lee | BN (SAPP) | Election declared null and void |
| Lunas | Kedah | 29 November 2000 | M Joseph Philomin Joseph Fernandez | BN (MIC) | Saifuddin Nasution Ismail | KeADILan | Death (murder) |
| Sanggang | Pahang | 1 April 2000 | Abdullah Kia | BN (UMNO) | Redzwan Harun | BN (UMNO) | Death (stroke) |

== 1995–99 ==
| By-election | State Assembly | Date | Incumbent | Party | Winner | Party | Cause |
|---|---|---|---|---|---|---|---|
| Pasir Tumboh | Kelantan | Cancelled | Daud Yusuf | PAS | —N/a | | Death (heart attack) |
| Jelawat | Kelantan | Cancelled | Mohd Daud Ja'afar | S46 | —N/a | | Death (colon cancer) |
| Sungai Bakap | Penang | 8 November 1997 | Ooi Theng Bok | BN (Gerakan) | Lai Chew Hock | BN (Gerakan) | Death (road accident) |
| Changkat Jering | Perak | 8 November 1997 | Mohamad Razlan Abdul Hamid | BN (UMNO) | Mat Isa Ismail | BN (UMNO) | Death (cancer) |
| Kidurong | Sarawak | 25–26 October 1997 | Wong Sing Ai | DAP | Michael Sim Kiam Hui | BN (SUPP) | Election declared null and void |
| Semerak | Kelantan | 11 August 1997 | Sulaiman Ahmad | PAS | Kamaruddin Mohd Nor | BN (UMNO) | Death (stroke) |
| Melekek | Malacca | 14 June 1997 | Mohd Zin Abdul Ghani | BN (UMNO) | Nawi Ahmad | BN (UMNO) | Death (brain stroke due to diabetes) |
| Repah | Negeri Sembilan | 29 May 1997 | Lay Chun Tai @ Loy Chee Tai | BN (MCA) | Gan Chin Yap | BN (MCA) | Death (brain stroke) |
| Permatang | Selangor | 29 May 1997 | Jamaluddin Adnan | BN (UMNO) | Abu Hassan Omar | BN (UMNO) | Resignation (to contest in a Kuala Selangor by-election) |
| Kemena | Sarawak | 24–25 May 1997 | Celestine Ujang Jilan | BN (PBB) | Celestine Ujang Jilan | BN (PBB) | Election declared null and void |
| Bukit Begunan | Sarawak | 15–16 March 1997 | Mong Dagang | BN (PBDS) | Mong Dagang | BN (PBDS) | Election declared null and void |
| Pulai Chondong | Kelantan | 6 January 1997 | Mohamad Noor Ahmad | S46 | Zulkifli Mamat | PAS | Death (cancer) |
| Bukit Asahan | Malacca | 22 June 1996 | Arunasalam Narayanan | BN (MIC) | R. Raghavan | BN (MIC) | Death (road accident) |

== 1990–95 ==
| By-election | State Assembly | Date | Incumbent | Party | Winner | Party | Cause |
|---|---|---|---|---|---|---|---|
| Sulabayan | Sabah | 28 January 1995 | Sakaran Dandai | BN (UMNO) | Nasir Sakaran | BN (UMNO) | Resignation on appointment as Yang di-Pertua Negeri of Sabah |
| Shahbandar Raya | Selangor | 28 May 1994 | T. M. Thurai | BN (MIC) | S. S. Rajagopal | BN (MIC) | Death |
| Lundang | Kelantan | 29 March 1994 | Mawardi Ahmad | PAS | Mohamad Daud | PAS | Death |
| Sementa | Selangor | 5 February 1994 | Abdul Samat Harun | BN (UMNO) | Abdul Rahman Palil | BN (UMNO) | Death (heart attack) |
| Kampung Raja | Terengganu | 13 October 1993 | Abdullah Muhammad | BN (UMNO) | Mohd Noor Hussin | BN (UMNO) | Death (road accident) |
| Batu Talam | Pahang | 28 August 1993 | Mohamed Mazlan Idris | BN (UMNO) | Syed Ali Syed Ahmad | BN (UMNO) | Death (murder) see also: Mona Fandey |
| Batu Kawah | Sarawak | (22 August 1992) | Chong Kiun Kong | BN (SUPP) | Alfred Yap Chin Loi | BN (SUPP) | Death (heart attack) |
| Bukit Payung | Terengganu | 21 April 1992 | Baharuddin Mohd | PAS | Mazlan Awang | BN (UMNO) | Election declared null and void |
| Jerlun | Kedah | 19 December 1991 | Yusuf Abd. Rahman | BN (UMNO) | Khalid Ahmad | BN (UMNO) | Death |
| Serkam | Malacca | 14 December 1991 | Arifin Baba | BN (UMNO) | Mohd. Salleh Md. Ali | BN (UMNO) | Death |
| Sungai Pinang | Kelantan | 24 August 1991 | Nordin Salleh | S46 | Mahmud Yaakub | S46 | Sought re-election upon change of party allegiance |
| Limbongan | Kelantan | 24 August 1991 | Wan Mohd Najib Wan Mohamad | S46 | Samat Mamat | S46 | Sought re-election upon change of party allegiance |
| Prai | Penang | 27 July 1991 | Asamaley Sinniah | DAP | V. Muthusamy | BN (MIC) | Resignation |
| Usukan | Sabah | 11 May 1991 | Mustapha Harun | USNO | Mustapha Harun | BN (UMNO) | Sought re-election upon change of party allegiance |
| Bayu | Kedah | 4 May 1991 | Seroji Haron | BN (UMNO) | Mohd Sibi Ahmad | BN (UMNO) | Death |
| Sulabayan | Sabah | 8 December 1990 | Sakaran Dandai | USNO | Nasir Sakaran | USNO | Resignation |
| Sipitang | Sabah | 8 December 1990 | Jawawi Isa | PBS | Jamilah Sulaiman | PBS | Death (colon cancer) |

== 1986–90 ==
| By-election | State Assembly | Date | Incumbent | Party | Winner | Party | Cause |
|---|---|---|---|---|---|---|---|
| Kijal | Terengganu | 1 August 1990 | Mohd Md Min | BN (UMNO) | Ahmad Said | BN (UMNO) | Death |
| Kuala Linggi | Malacca | 29 July 1990 | Bahari Hasan | BN (UMNO) | Ibrahim Durum | BN (UMNO) | Death |
| Pantai Merdeka | Kedah | 24 March 1990 | Ghazali Bakar | BN (UMNO) | Shuaib Lazim | BN (UMNO) | Death |
| Ranau | Sabah | 9 December 1989 | Mark Koding | PBS | Siringan Gubat | PBS | Sought re-election upon change of party allegiance |
| Sungai Besar | Selangor | 1 November 1989 | Abu Samah Nordin | BN (UMNO) | Mahbud Hashim | BN (UMNO) | Death |
| Teruntum | Pahang | 12 August 1989 | Lim Ah Lek | BN (MCA) | Kan Tong Leong | BN (MCA) | Resignation (to contest in a Bentong by-election) |
| Tambatan | Johor | 5 August 1989 | Mahmood Daud | BN (UMNO) | A. Kadir Annuar | BN (UMNO) | Death |
| Teluk Pasu | Terengganu | 24 June 1989 | Ismail Yusof | BN (UMNO) | Harun Taib | PAS | Death |
| Parit Raja | Johor | 20 October 1988 | Syed Zain Idrus | BN (UMNO) | Mohd. Yasin Kamari | BN (UMNO) | Death |
| Tanjong Puteri | Johor | 5 March 1988 | Md Yunos Sulaiman | BN (UMNO) | Md Yunos Sulaiman | BN (UMNO) | Election declared null and void |
| Bongawan | Sabah | 19 September 1987 | Abd Karim Abdul Ghani | USNO | Abdul Ghani Bidin | PBS | Resignation |
| Bukit Tuku | Kelantan | 28 June 1987 | Zakaria Botok | BN (UMNO) | Mohamed Zain Ismail | BN (UMNO) | Death |
| Usukan | Sabah | 18 April 1987 | Abdul Hamid Mustapha | USNO | Mustapha Harun | USNO | Death (heart attack) |
| Sulaman | Sabah | 30 November 1986 | Osu Sukam | USNO | Jasni Gindug | PBS | Resignation |
| Batang Ai | Sarawak | 29-30 August 1986 | Sylvester Langit | BN (SNAP) | Mikai Mandau | Independent | Death |

== 1982–86 ==
| By-election | State Assembly | Date | Incumbent | Party | Winner | Party | Cause |
|---|---|---|---|---|---|---|---|
| Lubok Merbau | Perak | Cancelled | Mior Aris Mior Abu Bakar | BN (UMNO) | —N/a | | Death |
| Oya | Sarawak | 2 July 1986 | Salleh Jafaruddin | BN (PBB) | Wan Madzihi Wan Madzhar | BN (PBB) | Sought re-election upon change of party allegiance |
| Karamunting | Sabah | 25 January 1986 | Lau Pui Keong | BERJAYA | Lau Pui Keong | PBS | Sought re-election upon change of party allegiance |
| Buang Sayang | Sabah | 25 January 1986 | Othman Mohamed Yassin | USNO | Osu Sukam | USNO | Sought re-election upon change of party allegiance |
| Balung | Sabah | 25 January 1986 | Ahmad Bahrom Abu Bakar Titingan | BERJAYA | Ahmad Bahrom Abu Bakar Titingan | PBS | Sought re-election upon change of party allegiance |
| Sukau | Sabah | 24–25 January 1986 | Saman Gulam | USNO | Zaki Gusmiah | USNO | Sought re-election upon change of party allegiance |
| Bandar Maran | Pahang | (4 January 1986) | Abdul Jalil Mohammad Seh | BN (UMNO) | Ayub Teh | BN (UMNO) | Death |
| Tambunan | Sabah | 29 December 1984 | Joseph Pairin Kitingan | BERJAYA | Joseph Pairin Kitingan | Independent | Sought re-election upon change of party allegiance |
| Rungkup | Perak | 3 December 1983 | Mohamed Yaacob Mohamed | BN (UMNO) | Mohamed Jamrah | BN (UMNO) | Death (heart attack) |
| Selising | Kelantan | 8 September 1983 | Abdul Rahman Ahmad | PAS | Wan Mohamed Wan Abu Bakar | BN (UMNO) | Election declared null and void |
| Kemumin | Kelantan | 8 September 1983 | Che Hassan Che Ishak | PAS | Umar Ibrahim | BN (BERJASA) | Election declared null and void |
| Tamparuli | Sabah | 16 July 1983 | James Ongkili | BERJAYA | Clarence E. Mansul | BERJAYA | Resignation |
| Bandar Raub | Pahang | 4 June 1983 | Tan Liew Thong | BN (MCA) | Lip Tuck Chee | DAP | Death |
| Kenering | Perak | 9 April 1983 | Wan Mohamed Wan Teh | BN (UMNO) | Johan Lahamat | BN (UMNO) | Resignation |
| Banggi | Sabah | (28 January 1983) | Abdul Salam Harun | USNO | Yahya Othman | BERJAYA | Disqualification (being declared a bankrupt) |
| Binjai | Terengganu | 9 December 1982 | Mohamed Nor Ali | BN (UMNO) | Muda Mamat | BN (UMNO) | Death |
| Kepayang | Perak | 16 October 1982 | Lim Cho Hock | DAP | Lau Dak Kee | DAP | Resignation |
| Usukan | Sabah | 1 October 1982 | Mohamed Said Keruak | USNO | Pandikar Amin Mulia | USNO | Resignation |
| Tandek | Sabah | 1 October 1982 | Dason Suran Gaban | BERJAYA | Villson Malingka | BERJAYA | Resignation |
| Batang Ai | Sarawak | | David Jemut | BN (SNAP) | Mikai Mandau | Independent | Resignation |
| Bengoh | Sarawak | 14 August 1982 | Stephen Yong Kuet Tze | BN (SUPP) | William Tanyuh Nub | BN (SUPP) | Resignation |
| Gemencheh | Negeri Sembilan | 22 May 1982 | Mohamad Taha Talib | BN (UMNO) | Waad Mansor | BN (UMNO) | The election was postponed after the murder of incumbent as a candidate, after nomination day of 1978 Negeri Sembilan state election. |

== 1978–82 ==
| By-election | State Assembly | Date | Incumbent | Party | Winner | Party | Cause |
|---|---|---|---|---|---|---|---|
| Lumadan | Sabah | 8 November 1981 | Mohamed Dun Banir | BERJAYA | Johari Mohamed Dun | BERJAYA | Resignation |
| Kunak | Sabah | 8 November 1981 | Abdul Hamid Mustapha | BERJAYA | Salim Bacho | USNO | Resignation |
| Balung | Sabah | 8 November 1981 | S. Abas S. Ali | BERJAYA | Ahmad Bahrom Abu Bakar Titingan | BERJAYA | Resignation |
| Ulu Muar | Negeri Sembilan | (17 September 1981) | Abdul Kadir Abdullah | BN (UMNO) | Ali Manat | BN (UMNO) | Death |
| Engkilili | Sarawak | 4-5 September 1981 | Nadeng Linggoh | BN (SNAP) | Jonathan Narwin | BN (SNAP) | Death |
| Satok | Sarawak | 23 May 1981 | Abang Abu Bakar Abang Mustapha | BN (PBB) | Abang Abdul Rahman Zohari Abang Openg | BN (PBB) | Resignation (to contest in Paloh federal by-election) |
| Matu-Daro | Sarawak | 22–23 May 1981 | Abdul Rahman Ya'kub | BN (PBB) | Unknown | BN (PBB) | Resignation (to accept the position of Yang di-Pertua Negeri of Sarawak) |
| Bengkoka | Sabah | 25–29 April 1981 | Abdul Salam Harun | USNO | Jasni Piut | BERJAYA | The election was postponed from 1981 Sabah state election because of the death of one of the candidates. |
| Sebandi | Sarawak | (10 March 1981) | Sharifah Mordiah Tuanku Fauzi | BN (PBB) | Abdul Taib Mahmud | BN (PBB) | Resignation |
| Pengkalan Kota | Penang | 15 November 1980 | Chooi Yew Choy | Independent | Lim Kean Siew | BN (MCA) | Death |
| Sugut | Sabah | 21-24 May 1980 | Betua Abbah | USNO | Pengiran Khafid Pengiran Salleh | BERJAYA | Resignation |
| Kemabong | Sabah | 21-24 May 1980 | Albert Chew Ah Nyuk | BERJAYA | Justin Sanggau | BERJAYA | Resignation |
| Bukit Raya | Kedah | 5 April 1980 | Ismail @ Shafie Kassim | PAS | Safirol Hashim | BN (UMNO) | Death |
| Oya | Sarawak | (28 January 1980) | Edwin Esnen Unang | BN (PBB) | Salleh Jafaruddin | BN (PBB) | Resignation (to contest in Mukah by-election) |
| Ranau | Sabah | 23–24 November 1979 | Amin Jahali | USNO | Jirin Salium | BERJAYA | Resignation |
| Balung | Sabah | 23–24 November 1979 | Abu Bakar Titingan | USNO | S. Abas S. Ali | BERJAYA | Resignation |
| Kuala Besut | Terengganu | 30 July 1979 | Zakaria Muda | BN (UMNO) | Wan Zakaria Wan Abdul Rahman | BN (UMNO) | Death (long illness) |
| Kuching Timor | Sarawak | 17 March 1979 | Lo Foot Kee | SNAP | Chua Kock Meng | Independent | Death |
| Muara Tuang | Sarawak | 20 January 1979 | Mohamad Musa | BN (PBB) | Adenan Satem | BN (PBB) | Death |
| Kampong Kolam | Penang | 9 December 1978 | Ooi Ean Kwong | DAP | Ooi Ean Kwong | DAP | Election declared null and void |
| Machan | Sarawak | 16 September 1978 | Leo Moggie Irok | BN (SNAP) | Gramong Juna | BN (SNAP) | Resignation |
| Titi Tinggi | Perlis | 19 August 1978 | Leong Choon Ling | BN (MCA) | Ng Eng Toon @ Goh Eng Toon | BN (MCA) | Death |
| Kampong Jawa | Selangor | 29 July 1978 | Raja Zulkifli Raja Borhan | BN (UMNO) | Raja Zulkifli Raja Borhan | BN (UMNO) | The election was postponed after all the four candidates were disqualified in the nomination day of 1978 Selangor state election |
| Inanam | Sabah | 29 July 1978 | Clarence E. Mansul | BERJAYA | Marcel Leiking | BERJAYA | Resignation |
| Matunggong | Sabah | 26–29 July 1978 | Amil Matinggi | BERJAYA | George Mojuntin | BERJAYA | Resignation |

== 1974–78 ==
| By-election | State Assembly | Date | Incumbent | Party | Winner | Party | Cause |
|---|---|---|---|---|---|---|---|
| Tendong | Kelantan | 10 June 1978 | Mohamed Nasir | BERJASA | Ghazali Awang Ibrahim | BERJASA | Resignation on appointment as Senator |
| Morib | Selangor | 6 May 1978 | Harun Idris | BN (UMNO) | Ishak Pangat @ Shafaat | BN (UMNO) | Disqualification (found guilty of corruption) |
| Jempol | Negeri Sembilan | 31 December 1977 | Mohamed Yassin Othman | BN (UMNO) | Jaafar Harun | BN (UMNO) | Death |
| Matunggong | Sabah | (20 December 1977) | Michael Francis Wong | BERJAYA | Amil Matinggi | BERJAYA | Resignation |
| Kenering | Perak | 19 November 1977 | Mohamed Ghazali Jawi | BN (UMNO) | Tajol Rosli Mohd Ghazali | BN (UMNO) | Resignation |
| Parit Jawa | Johor | 5 November 1977 | Mohamed Zain Maidin | BN (UMNO) | Shahadan Sabtu | BN (UMNO) | Death (road accident) |
| Bertam | Penang | (16 June 1977) | Ahmad Abdullah | BN (UMNO) | Abdul Rahman Abbas | BN (UMNO) | Death |
| Balingian | Sarawak | 9–11 June 1977 | Salleh Jafaruddin | BN (PBB) | Wan Habib Syed Mahmud | BN (PBB) | Resignation on appointment as Senator |
| Bandar Penggaram | Johor | 5 February 1977 | Tan Siew Yong | BN (MCA) | Lim Tong Keng | BN (MCA) | Death |
| Tanjong Aru | Sabah | 31 July 1976 | Darius Binion | BERJAYA | Matthew Gonzaga | BERJAYA | Death (Double Six Crash) |
| Moyog | Sabah | 31 July 1976 | Peter Mojuntin | BERJAYA | Conrad Mojuntin | BERJAYA | Death (Double Six Crash) |
| Papar | Sabah | 31 July 1976 | Salleh Sulong | BERJAYA | Mohamed Noor Mansor | BERJAYA | Death (Double Six Crash) |
| Kota Kinabalu | Sabah | 31 July 1976 | Chong Thien Vun | BERJAYA | Lim Guan Sing | BERJAYA | Death (Double Six Crash) |
| Kiulu | Sabah | (15 July 1976) | Fuad Stephens | BERJAYA | Rahimah Stephens | BERJAYA | Death (Double Six Crash) |
| Semariang | Sarawak | July 1976 | Ajibah Abol | BN (PBB) | Hafsah Harun | BN (PBB) | Death |
| Lunas | Kedah | 13 June 1976 | Soon Cheng Leong | BN (MCA) | Lim Wan Ming | BN (MCA) | Death |
| Labuan | Sabah | 8–10 December 1975 | Harris Salleh | BERJAYA | Mohammed Omar Beldram | USNO | Resignation |
| Kuala Kinabatangan | Sabah | 8–10 December 1975 | Salleh Sulong | BERJAYA | Pengiran Galpam Pengiran Indar | USNO | Resignation |
| Merbok | Kedah | 15 April 1975 | Mansor Akil | BN (UMNO) | | BN (UMNO) | Death |
| Alor Pongsu | Perak | 18 December 1974 | Masud Untoi | BN (UMNO) | Mohamed Abbas | BN (UMNO) | Death |

== 1969–74 ==
| By-election | State Assembly | Date | Incumbent | Party | Winner | Party | Cause |
|---|---|---|---|---|---|---|---|
| Parit Bakar | Johor | 15 June 1974 | Abdul Aziz Ishak | Alliance (UMNO) | Mohamed Zin Maidin | Alliance (UMNO) | Death |
| Sungei Bahru | Malacca | 18 May 1974 | Abdullah Samad | Alliance (UMNO) | Johari Yusof | Alliance (UMNO) | Death |
| Bandar Kangar | Perlis | 6 April 1974 | Quah Chooi Tong | Alliance (MCA) | Tan Thean Choo | Alliance (MCA) | Death |
| Pasir Puteh Tengah | Kelantan | 9 March 1974 | Muhammad Ismail | Alliance (UMNO) | Raja Mahmud Raja Mamat | Alliance (UMNO) | Death |
| Engkilili-Skrang | Sarawak | (January 1974) | Simon Dembab Maja | PESAKA | Alfred Jabu Numpang | PESAKA | Resignation |
| Kuching Barat | Sarawak | 15 December 1973 | Shahbuddin Cheng Yew Kiew | Alliance (SCA) | Abang Abu Bakar Abang Mustapha | Alliance (BUMIPUTERA) | Resignation |
| Kuala Nerus | Terengganu | 17 November 1973 | Ibrahim Fikri Mohamed | Alliance (UMNO) | Abdul Rashid Ngah | Alliance (UMNO) | Death |
| Kajang | Selangor | 3 November 1973 | Mohd. Nazir Abdul Jalil | Alliance (UMNO) | Mohamed Azmir Mohd. Nazir | Alliance (UMNO) | Death |
| Johore Lama | Johor | 22 October 1973 | Ismail Sa'adon | Alliance (UMNO) | Mohamed Yusoff Jani | Alliance (UMNO) | Death |
| Elopura | Sabah | (4 August 1973) | Ngui Tet Min | Alliance (SCA) | Ngui Tet Loi | Alliance (SCA) | Death (helicopter crash) |
| Kota Bharu Tengah | Kelantan | 10 February 1973 | Mohamad Asri Muda | PAS | Salahuddin Abdullah | PAS | Resignation |
| Sebandi | Sarawak | 27 January 1973 | Ikhwan Zainei | Alliance (BUMIPUTERA) | Sulaiman Daud | Alliance (BUMIPUTERA) | Resignation |
| Tumpat Barat | Kelantan | 26 February 1972 | Wan Salleh @ Wan Abdullah Wan Sulaiman | PAS | Ismail Cik Ali | PAS | Death |
| Muda | Penang | 11 December 1971 | Ismail Che Chik | Alliance (UMNO) | Abdul Kadir Hassan | Alliance (UMNO) | Resignation |
| Sidam | Kedah | 21 August 1971 | Hanafi Mohd. Yunus | Alliance (UMNO) | Yassin Ibrahim | Alliance (UMNO) | Death |
| Batu Rakit | Terengganu | 21 August 1971 | Mansor Mohamed | Alliance (UMNO) | Nik Hassan Abdul Rahman | Alliance (UMNO) | Resignation |
| Pelagus | Sarawak | 8–17 July 1971 | Bennet Jarrow | PESAKA | Leonard Linggi Jugah | PESAKA | Death |
| Yen-Merbok | Kedah | 22 May 1971 | Lebai Ismail Abdul Wahab | Alliance (UMNO) | Abdullah Ismail Affendi | Alliance (UMNO) | Death |
| Bekok | Johor | 15 May 1971 | Sim Kim Chong @ Siew Ah See | Alliance (MCA) | Ng Nam Seng | Alliance (MCA) | Death |

== 1964–69 ==
| By-election | State Assembly | Date | Incumbent | Party | Winner | Party | Cause |
|---|---|---|---|---|---|---|---|
| Serdang | Selangor | 28 December 1968 | Chin Kek Kum | Socialist Front (Ra'ayat) | Thuan Paik Phok | Alliance (MCA) | Resignation |
| Pendang | Kedah | 30 November 1968 | Syed Ibrahim Syed Kechik | Alliance (UMNO) | Abdul Manaf Abdullah | Alliance (UMNO) | Death |
| Bukit Serampang | Johor | 7 September 1968 | Hassan Yunus | Alliance (UMNO) | Abdul Rahman Mahmud | Alliance (UMNO) | Death |
| Ranau | Sabah | (12 June 1968) | Ganie Gilong | UPKO | Mohamed Yassin Hashim | USNO | Resignation |
| Bachok Utara | Kelantan | 6 April 1968 | Shafie Ahmad | PAS | Mohamad Nor Ismail | PAS | Death (stroke) |
| Baling Barat | Kedah | 27 January 1968 | Syed Omar Syed Abdullah Shahabudin | Alliance (UMNO) | Mohammad Zain Yusoff | Alliance (UMNO) | Death |
| Tampoi | Johor | 30 September 1967 | Daud Ahmad | Alliance (UMNO) | Elias Udin | Alliance (UMNO) | Death |
| Kampong Bharu | Selangor | 7 January 1967 | Abdullah Yassin | Alliance (UMNO) | Razali Mohamed Ali | Alliance (UMNO) | Death |
| Sungei Bahru | Malacca | 19 March 1966 | Tamby Chik Abdul Karim | Alliance (UMNO) | Abdullah Samad | Alliance (UMNO) | Death |
| Rahang | Negeri Sembilan | 11 December 1965 | Han Hiu Fong | Alliance (MCA) | Chen Man Hin | Independent | Death |
| Ayer Itam | Penang | 6 November 1965 | Chor Sin Kheng | Alliance (MCA) | Lim Kean Siew | Socialist Front (Labour) | Death |
| Jitra | Kedah | 19 August 1965 | Omar Salleh | Alliance (UMNO) | Mohamed Zain Ahmad | Alliance (UMNO) | Death |
| Hong Lim | Singapore | 10 July 1965 | Ong Eng Guan | UPP | Lee Khoon Choy | PAP | Resignation |
| Tumpat Tengah | Kelantan | 10 October 1964 | Mahmood Mat Amin | Alliance (UMNO) | Lat Kassim | Alliance (UMNO) | Death |
| Jelai | Pahang | 26 September 1964 | Muhammad Nor Sulaiman | Alliance (UMNO) | Abu Samah Idris | Alliance (UMNO) | Death (road accident) |

== 1959–64 ==
| By-election | State Assembly | Date | Incumbent | Party | Winner | Party | Cause |
|---|---|---|---|---|---|---|---|
| Balik Pulau | Penang | 14 December 1963 | Mohamed Hassan Kassim | Alliance (UMNO) | Ahmad Mohamed Taib | Alliance (UMNO) | Death |
Establishment of Malaysia; Successor to Federation of Malaya, North Borneo, Sarawak, Singapore
| Telok Datoh | Selangor | 7 September 1963 | Raja Ismail Raja Ibrahim | Alliance (UMNO) | Hormat Rafei | Alliance (UMNO) | Death |
| Pahang Tua | Pahang | 30 March 1963 | Ahmad Othman | Alliance (UMNO) | Mohammed Moktar Daud | Alliance (UMNO) | Death |
| Port Swettenham | Selangor | 12 January 1963 | Abdullah Hassan | Alliance (UMNO) | Adnan Chik | Alliance (UMNO) | Death |
| Rantau Panjang | Kelantan | 2 June 1962 | Abdul Rahman Daud | PMIP | Ahmad Yatim | PMIP | Death |
| Gemas | Negeri Sembilan | 3 February 1962 | Fong Yew Wang | Alliance (MCA) | Goh Boh Tah | Alliance (MCA) | Death (long illness) |
| Pontian Kechil | Johor | 24 June 1961 | Abdullah Mohsin | Alliance (UMNO) | Abdul Rahman Mohammed Amin | Alliance (UMNO) | Death |
| Kota Tengah | Malacca | 29 December 1960 | Goh Chee Yan | Alliance (MCA) | Khoo Chua Seng | Alliance (MCA) | Death |
| Grik | Perak | 8 June 1960 | Mohamed Ghazali Jawi | Alliance (UMNO) | Din Jusoh | Alliance (UMNO) | Resignation on appointment as Malaya's ambassador in Cairo |
| Sri Lalang | Johor | 22 May 1960 | Cheong Soo Kheng | Alliance (MCA) | Ong Kai Beng | Alliance (MCA) | Death |
| Plentong | Johor | 23 November 1959 | Mohamad Noah Omar | Alliance (UMNO) | Fatimah Abdul Majid | Alliance (UMNO) | Resignation on appointment as Speaker of the Dewan Rakyat |

== 1955–59 ==
| By-election | State | Date | Incumbent | Party | Winner | Party | Cause |
|---|---|---|---|---|---|---|---|
| Batu Pahat Central | Johor | (24 October 1957) | S. Chelvasingam MacIntyre | Alliance (MIC) | Syed Mustapha Akil | Alliance (UMNO) | Resignation on appointment as Malayan High Commissioner to India |
| Larut South-Matang | Perak | 26 October 1957 | Mohamed Ghazali Jawi | Alliance (UMNO) | Wan Othman Wan Omar | Alliance (UMNO) | Resignation on appointment as Menteri Besar of Perak |
| Kluang | Johor | 10 November 1955 | Sardon Jubir | Alliance (UMNO) | Syed Mohamed Edros | Alliance (UMNO) | Resignation |
| Johore Bahru Central | Johor | 10 November 1955 | Sulaiman Abdul Rahman | Alliance (UMNO) | Syed Nasir Ismail | Alliance (UMNO) | Resignation |
