= 1997 Melekek by-election =

By-election in Malaysia in 1997

← 1995	14 June 1997	1999 →

Melekek seat in the Melaka State Legislative Assembly
- Turnout: 4,897
	BN	IND
Candidate	Nawi Ahmad	J.Appalasamy
Party	UMNO	Independent
Alliance	BN
Popular vote	4,559	128
Percentage	93.10%	2.61%
MLA before election
Mohd Zin Abdul Ghani
Barisan Nasional (UMNO)
Elected MLA
Nawi Ahmad
Barisan Nasional (UMNO)

The 1997 Melekek by-election was a by-election that was held on 14 June 1997 for the Malacca State Legislative Assembly seat of Melekek. It was called following the death of its assemblyman Mohd Zin Abdul Ghani by stroke. Zin, from Barisan Nasional (BN) component party United Malays National Organization (UMNO) won the seat on three previous general election, and at the time of his death is the Chief Minister of Melaka since 1994.

Nawi Ahmad of Barisan Nasional won the seat against Independent candidate J.Appalasamy with a majority of 4,431 while Appalasamy lost his deposit.The seat have 7,874 registered voters.

== Nomination ==
DAP announced that it will not contest the seat.PAS also decide to not field a candidate. On nomination day, two candidate were confirmed. Barisan Nasional nominated former teacher Nawi Ahmad while another candidate is Independent J.Appalasamy.

== Results ==
Malacca state by-election, 14 June 1997: Melekek upon the death of incumbent Mohd Zin
Party	Candidate	Votes	%	∆%
BN	Nawi Ahmad	4,559	0	0
Independent	J.Appalasamy	128	0	0
Total valid votes		4,787	0	0
Total rejected ballots		110	0	0
Unreturned ballots		0	0	0
Turnout		4,897	0	0
Registered electors		7,874	0	0
Majority		4,431	0	0
BN gain		Swing		?
