= 1994 Shahbandar Raya by-election =

← 1990	28 May 1994	1995 →

Shahbandar Raya seat in the Selangor State Legislative Assembly
	BN	IND	IND
Candidate	S. S. Rajagopal	Subari Saman	Pu Palan Muthusamy
Party	BN (MIC)	Independent	Independent
Popular vote	13,909	3,080	871
Percentage	77.88%	17.25%	4.88%
Shahbandar Raya assemblyman before election
T. M. Thurai
BN (MIC)
Elected Shahbandar Raya assemblyman
S. S. Rajagopal
BN (MIC)

The 1994 Shahbandar Raya by-election is a by-election for the Selangor State Legislative Assembly seat of Shahbandar Raya that were held on 30 November 1986. It was called following the death of the incumbent, T. M. Thurai on 30 March 1994.

== Background ==
T. M. Thurai, a candidate of Barisan Nasional (BN), were elected to the state seat of Shahbandar Raya in the 1990 Selangor state election, defeating A.N. Mathurai of Indian Progressive Front (IPF) who were using Semangat 46's logo and name as part of Angkatan Perpaduan Ummah-Gagasan Rakyat coalition. Thurai were a member of BN's component party Malaysian Indian Congress (MIC).

On 30 March 1994, Thurai died on board of an airplane heading to Melbourne, as he seek medical treatment. This necessitates for by-election for the seat to be held, as the seat were vacated more that 2 years before the expiry of the state assembly current term.

== Nomination and campaign ==
On the nomination day, it were confirmed there will be a three-way fight between BN and 2 other independent candidates for the Shahbandar Raya seat. BN nominated S.S. Rajagopal, the MIC Batu Caves division chairman and the party's national executive secretary. Pu Palan Muthusamy, a local businessman, and Subari Saman, also saw their nomination as independent candidates accepted by SPR. The nomination day also saw another candidate nomination rejected as he were 5 second late after nomination period closed.

== Timeline ==
The key dates are listed below.

Date	Event
	Issue of the Writ of Election
17 May 1994	Nomination Day
17-27 May 1994	Campaigning Period
	Early polling day for postal and overseas voters
28 May 1994	Polling Day

== Results ==
Selangor state by-election, 28 May 1994: Shahbandar Raya Upon the death of incumbent, T. M. Thurai
Party	Candidate	Votes	%	∆%
BN	S. S. Rajagopal	13,909	77.88	
Independent	Subari Saman	3,080	17.25	
Independent	Pu Palan Muthusamy	871	4.88	
Total valid votes		17,860	100.00	
Total rejected ballots		247		
Unreturned ballots				
Turnout		18,107	48.21	
Registered electors		37,559		
Majority		10,829		
BN hold		Swing		

== Previous result ==
Selangor state election, 1990: Shahbandar Raya
Party	Candidate	Votes	%	∆%
BN	T. M. Thurai	13,357	58.69	
S46	A. N. Mathurai	9,400	41.31	
Total valid votes		22,757	100.00	
Total rejected ballots		977		
Unreturned ballots				
Turnout		23,734	76.37	
Registered electors		31,076		
Majority		3,957		
BN hold		Swing		

== Aftermath ==
Muhammad Muhammad Taib, Selangor Menteri Besar and BN Selangor chairman, thanked the voters for choosing BN and said the win will be an impetus by state and federal government to speed up the country's development progress. Then Opposition Leader in Dewan Rakyat, Lim Kit Siang, dismissed the win by BN, citing the votes received by BN were only slightly higher than previous election while no major opposition party contesting against BN, and claiming most of the voters in the constituency did not turn out due to 'silent protest'.
