= Simpang Jeram =

Political subdivision in Johor, Malaysia

Simpang Jeram (N13)
Johor constituency
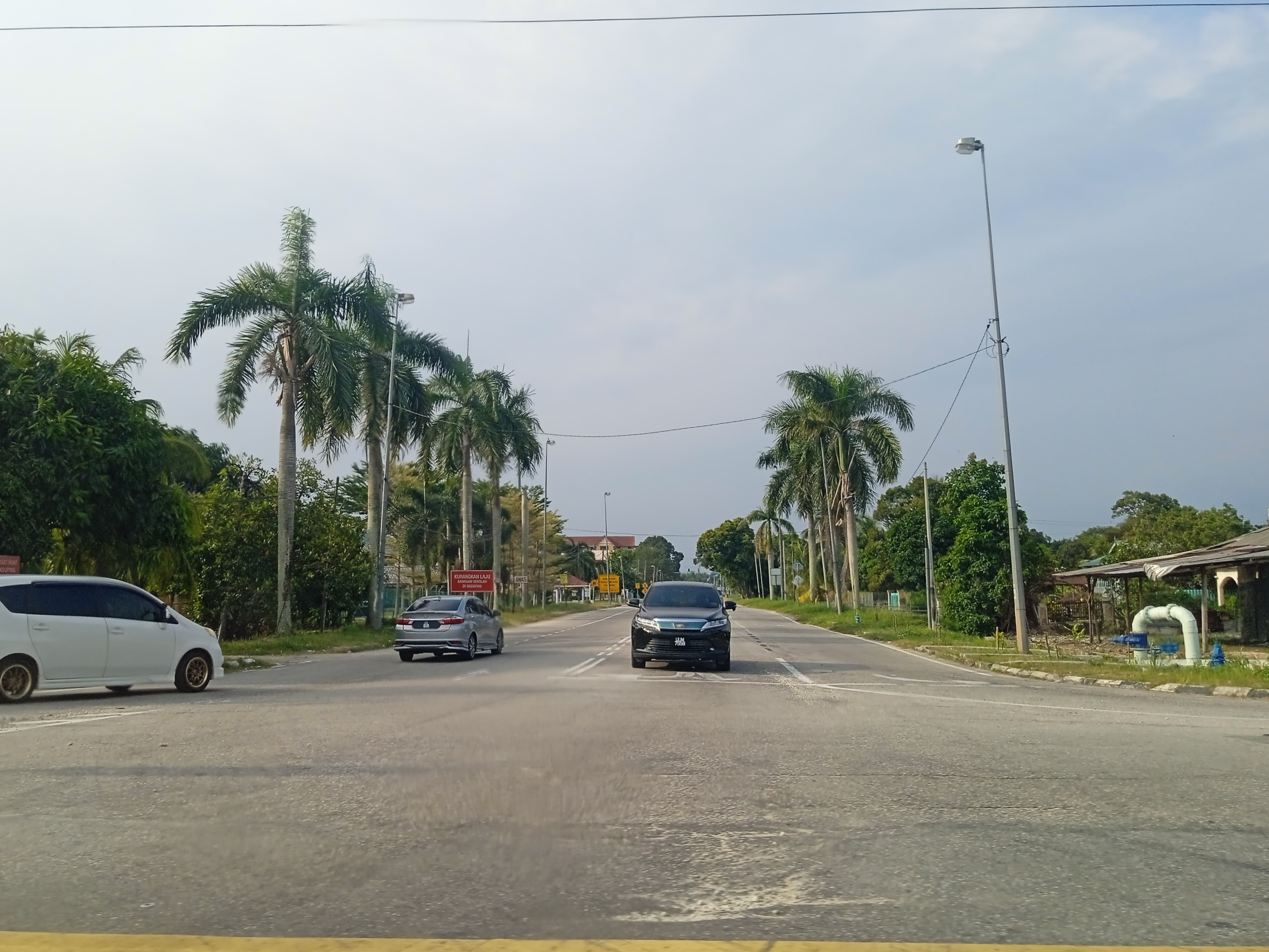

State constituency
- Legislature: Johor State Legislative Assembly
MLA
Nazri Abdul Rahman
PH
- Constituency created: 2018
- First contested: 2018
- Last contested: 2026

Demographics
- Population (2020): 66,860
- Electors (2023): 40,379
- Area (km²): 36

Simpang Jeram is a state constituency in Johor, Malaysia, that is represented in the Johor State Legislative Assembly.

The state constituency was first contested in 2018 and is mandated to return a single Assemblyman to the Johor State Legislative Assembly under the first-past-the-post voting system.

== Demographics ==
As of 2020, Simpang Jeram has a population of 66,860 people.

Ethnic breakdown of Simpang Jeram's electorate as of 2026
1. Malay (52.0%)
2. Chinese (44.7%)
3. Indians (2.40%)
4. Other ethnicities (0.90%)

== History ==
=== Polling districts ===
According to the federal gazette issued on 30 March 2018, the Simpang Jeram constituency is divided into 13 polling districts.

State constituency	Polling Districts	Code	Location
Simpang Jeram（N13）	Jalan Sakeh	145/13/01	Sekolah Agama Tun Dr. Ismail
Simpang Jeram（N13）	Temenggong Ahmad Dalam	145/13/02	SK Parit Keroma Darat
Simpang Jeram（N13）	Sungai Abong	145/13/03	SMK Sungai Abong
Simpang Jeram（N13）	Jalan Haji Abdullah	145/13/04	SK Bakri Batu 2
Simpang Jeram（N13）	Haji Abdullah Selatan	145/13/05	Sekolah Agama Parit Keroma Darat
Simpang Jeram（N13）	Jeram Tengah	145/13/06	Sekolah Agama Seri Bukit Batu
Simpang Jeram（N13）	Bukit Batu	145/13/07	SK Seri Bukit Batu
Simpang Jeram（N13）	Kampong Ulu	145/13/08	Sekolah Agama Bakri Batu Enam
Simpang Jeram（N13）	Simpang Jeram	145/13/09	SK Simpang Jeram
Simpang Jeram（N13）	Sri Tanjong	145/13/10	SK Bakri Batu 5
Simpang Jeram（N13）	Kampong Sungai Abong	145/13/11	Kolej Vokasional Muar

=== Representation history ===
Members of the Legislative Assembly for Simpang Jeram
Assembly	No	Years	Member	Party
Constituency renamed from Sungai Abong
14th	N13	2018–2022	Salahuddin Ayub	PH (AMANAH)
15th	N13	2022–2023	Salahuddin Ayub	PH (AMANAH)
15th	N13	2023–2026	Nazri Abdul Rahman	PH (AMANAH)
16th	N13	2026-present	Nazri Abdul Rahman	PH (AMANAH)

== Election results ==
Johor state election, 2026: Simpang Jeram
Party	Candidate	Votes	%	∆%
PH	Nazri Abdul Rahman	12,022	41.03	▼15.51
BN	Azman Ismail	11,852	40.45	▲40.45
PN	Arshed Yahya	3,962	13.52	▼28.67
MUDA	Ainie Haziqah Shafii	1,467	5.01	▲5.01
Total valid votes		29,303	100.00	
Total rejected ballots		297		
Unreturned ballots		269		
Turnout		29,869	71.16	▲10.31
Registered electors		41,975		
Majority		170	0.58	▼13.77
PH hold		Swing		

Johor state by-election, 9 September 2023: Simpang Jeram Upon the death of incumbent, Salahuddin Ayub
Party	Candidate	Votes	%	∆%
PH	Nazri Abdul Rahman	13,844	56.54	▲15.60
PN	Mohd Mazri Yahya	10,330	42.19	▲12.47
Independent	Jeganathan Subramaniam	311	1.27	▲1.27
Total valid votes		24,485	100.00	
Total rejected ballots		74		
Unreturned ballots		12		
Turnout		24,571	60.85	▲6.13
Registered electors		40,379		
Majority		3,514	14.35	▲3.13
PH hold		Swing		
Source(s) https://lom.agc.gov.my/ilims/upload/portal/akta/outputp/1857938/PUB%20400%20(2023).pdf

Johor state election, 2022: Simpang Jeram
Party	Candidate	Votes	%	∆%
PH	Salahuddin Ayub	8,749	40.94	▲40.94
PN	Zarul Salleh	6,350	29.72	▲29.72
BN	Lokman Md Don	6,062	28.37	▼0.90
PEJUANG	Mahaizal Mahmor	208	0.97	▲0.97
Total valid votes		21,369	100.00	
Total rejected ballots		387		
Unreturned ballots		141		
Turnout		21,897	54.72	▼30.58
Registered electors		40,014		
Majority		2,399	11.22	▼21.14
PH hold		Swing		

Johor state election, 2018: Simpang Jeram
Party	Candidate	Votes	%
PKR	Salahuddin Ayub	14,640	61.63
BN	Mohd Radzi Amin	6,953	29.27
PAS	Mohd Mazri Yahya	2,135	8.99
Independent	Ahmad Hashim	28	0.10
Total valid votes		23,756	100.00
Total rejected ballots		235	
Unreturned ballots		0	
Turnout		24,049	85.30
Registered electors		28,193	
Majority		7,687	32.36
This was a new constituency created.
