= Kota Raja (Selangor state constituency) =

Selangor constituency

Defunct state constituency
- Legislature: Selangor State Legislative Assembly
- Constituency created: 1994
- Constituency abolished: 2004
- First contested: 1995
- Last contested: 1999

Kota Raja was a state constituency in Selangor, Malaysia, that was represented in the Selangor State Legislative Assembly from 1995 to 2004.

The state constituency was created in the 1994 redistribution and was mandated to return a single member to the Selangor State Legislative Assembly under the first past the post voting system.

== History ==
It was abolished in 2004 when it was redistributed.

=== Representation history ===
Members of the Legislative Assembly for Kota Raja
Assembly	No	Years	Member	Party
Constituency created from Shahbandar Raya
9th	N37	1995-1999	Rajakupal Sinathamby	BN (MIC)
10th	N37	1999-2004	Kamala Ganapathy	BN (MIC)
Constituency abolished, split into Kota Alam Shah and Seri Andalas

== Election results ==
Selangor state election, 1999
Party	Candidate	Votes	%	∆%
BN	Kamala Ganapathy	12,686	55.04	▼19.45
PAS	Khalid Abdul Samad	10,361	44.96	▲44.96
Total valid votes		23,047	100.00	
Total rejected ballots		451		
Unreturned ballots		11		
Turnout		23,509	76.90	▲1.72
Registered electors		30,571		
Majority		2,325	10.09	▼38.90
BN hold		Swing		

Selangor state election, 1995
Party	Candidate	Votes	%
BN	Rajakupal Sinathamby	15,483	74.49
S46	Salmah Safarman	5,301	25.51
Total valid votes		20,784	100.00
Total rejected ballots		548	
Unreturned ballots		0	
Turnout		21,332	75.18
Registered electors		28,376	
Majority		10,182	46.99
This was a new constituency created.
