= 2009 Manek Urai by-election =

Election in Malaysia

← 2008	14 July 2009	2013 →

Manek Urai seat in the Kelantan State Legislative Assembly
	PAS	BN
Candidate	Mohd Fauzi Abdullah	Tuan Aziz Tuan Hamat
Party	PAS	BN (UMNO)
Alliance	PR
Popular vote	5,348	5,283
Percentage	50.31%	49.69%
Manek Urai assemblyman before election
Ismail Yaacob
PAS
Elected Manek Urai assemblyman
Mohd Fauzi Abdullah
PAS

The 2009 Manek Urai by-election is a by-election for the Kelantan State Legislative Assembly state seat of Manek Urai, Malaysia that were held on 14 July 2009. It was called following the death of the incumbent, Ismail Yaacob on 22 May 2009.

== Background ==
Ismail Yaacob, from Pan-Malaysian Islamic Party (PAS), were elected to the Kelantan State Legislative Assembly state seat of Manek Urai at the 1986 Kelantan state election, winning the seat from Barisan Nasional (BN). He has since held the seat for 4 terms, but not defending the seat in 2004 which saw the seat fell back to BN's hand. Ismail returned to contest the seat in 2008 state election, winning back the seat from BN. He was the deputy chief of the party's Kuala Krai division.

On 22 May 2009, Ismail died at Raja Zainab Hospital, Kota Bharu, after being admitted to the hospital since 26 April 2009 for treatment after suffering a heart attack. His death means that Manek Urai state seat were vacated. This necessitates for by-election to be held, as the seat were vacated more that 2 years before the expiry of Kelantan assembly current term. Election Commission of Malaysia (SPR) announced on 28 May 2009 that the by-election for the seat will be held on 14 July 2009, with 6 July 2009 set as the nomination day.

== Nomination and campaign ==
After nomination closed, it was confirmed that BN will face PAS in a straight fight for the Manek Urai seat. BN nominated Tuan Aziz Tuan Mat @ Tuan Hamat from United Malays National Organization (UMNO), a manager at the Southern Kelantan Development Board (KESEDAR) and the party's Kuala Krai youth chief. PAS meanwhile nominated Mohd Fauzi Abdullah, a fish wholesaler, and treasurer for the party's Kuala Krai division. Parti Angkatan Keadilan Insan Malaysia (AKIM) president Hanafi Mamat, who was said to be contesting in the by-election, did not turn up for the nomination process.

== Timeline ==
The key dates are listed below.

Date	Event
	Issue of the Writ of Election
6 July 2009	Nomination Day
6–13 July 2009	Campaigning Period
	Early polling day for postal and overseas voters
14 July 2009	Polling Day

== Results ==
Kelantan state by-election, 14 July 2009: Manek Urai The by-election was called due to the death of incumbent, Ismail Yaacob.
Party	Candidate	Votes	%	∆%
PAS	Mohd Fauzi Abdullah	5,348	50.31	▼6.36
BN	Tuan Aziz Tuan Hamat	5,283	49.69	▲6.36
Total valid votes		10,631	100.00	
Total rejected ballots		117		
Unreturned ballots		6		
Turnout		10,754	87.48	▲3.25
Registered electors		12,293		
Majority		65	0.62	▼12.72
PAS hold		Swing		
Source(s) "Pilihan Raya Kecil N.41 Manek Urai". Election Commission of Malaysia.

=== Previous result ===
Kelantan state election, 2008: Manek Urai
Party	Candidate	Votes	%	∆%
PAS	Ismail Yaacob	5,746	56.67	▲6.98
BN	Mohamed Dahan Mat Jali	4,394	43.33	▼6.98
Total valid votes		10,140	100.00	
Total rejected ballots		192		
Unreturned ballots		21		
Turnout		10,353	84.23	▲2.14
Registered electors		12,292		
Majority		1,352	13.34	▲12.72
PAS gain from BN		Swing	N/A	
