= Taboh Naning =

State constituency in Malacca, Malaysia

Taboh Naning (N05)
Malacca constituency

State constituency
- Legislature: Malacca State Legislative Assembly
MLA
Zulkiflee Mohd Zin
BN
- Constituency created: 1974
- Constituency abolished: 1986
- Constituency re-created: 2004
- First contested: 1974
- Last contested: 2026

Demographics
- Electors (2026): 11,299

N05 Taboh Naning within Malacca, as used for the 2021 state election

Taboh Naning is a state constituency in Malacca, Malaysia, that has been represented in the Malacca State Legislative Assembly.

It was first contested in 1974 and abolished in 1986 and recreated in 2004. It is mandated to return a single Assemblyman to the Malacca State Legislative Assembly under the first-past-the-post voting system. Since 2021, the State assemblyman for Taboh Naning is Zulkiflee Mohd Zin from United Malays National Organisation (UMNO) which is part of the state's ruling coalition, Barisan Nasional (BN).

== Definition ==
The Taboh Naning constituency contains the polling districts of Cherana Puteh, Simpang Empat, Berisu, Sungai Buloh, Batang Melekek, Rantau Panjang and Ayer Paabas.

== Demographics ==
Ethnic breakdown of Taboh Naning's electorate as of 2026
1. Malays (78.9%)
2. Chinese (11.3%)
3. Indians (5.90%)
4. Other Ethnicities (3.80%)

== History ==
According to the gazette issued on 5 November 2026, the Taboh Naning constituency has a total of 7 polling districts.

State constituency	Polling districts	Code	Location
Taboh Naning (N05)	Cherana Puteh	134/05/01	SK Cherana Puteh
Taboh Naning (N05)	Simpang Empat	134/05/02	SK Simpang Empat
Taboh Naning (N05)	Berisu	134/05/03	SK Berisu
Taboh Naning (N05)	Sungai Buloh	134/05/04	SK Sungai Buloh
Taboh Naning (N05)	Batang Melekek	134/05/05	SK Melekek
Taboh Naning (N05)	Rantau Panjang	134/05/06	SK Rantau Panjang
Taboh Naning (N05)	Ayer Paabas	132/05/07	SK Ayer Pa'abas

=== Representation history ===
Members of the Legislative Assembly for Taboh Naning
Assembly	No	Years	Member	Party
Constituency created from Ramuan China, Pulau Sebang and Masjid Tanah
4th	N01	1974–1978	Abdul Razak Alias	BN (UMNO)
5th	N01	1978–1982	Abdul Razak Alias	BN (UMNO)
6th	N01	1982–1986	Abdul Razak Alias	BN (UMNO)
Constituency abolished, split into Melekek and Pulau Sebang
Constituency created, renamed from Melekek
11th	N05	2004–2008	Nawi Ahmad	BN (UMNO)
12th	N05	2008–2013	Latipah Omar	BN (UMNO)
13th	N05	2013–2018	Latipah Omar	BN (UMNO)
14th	N05	2018–2021	Latipah Omar	BN (UMNO)
15th	N05	2021–2026	Zulkiflee Mohd Zin	BN (UMNO)
16th	N05	2026–present	Zulkiflee Mohd Zin	BN (UMNO)

== Election results ==
Malacca state election, 2026: Taboh Naning
Party	Candidate	Votes	%	∆%
BN	Zulkiflee Mohd Zin	6,470	81.76	▲24.53
PH	Junainah Sahat	1,443	18.24	▼0.25
Total valid votes		7,913		
Total rejected ballots		117		
Unreturned ballots		13		
Turnout		8,043	71.18	▲5.83
Registered electors		11,299		
Majority		5,027	63.52	▲30.57
BN hold		Swing		
Source(s) https://electiondata.my/elections/mlk/SE-16/

Malacca state election, 2021: Taboh Naning
Party	Candidate	Votes	%	∆%
BN	Zulkiflee Mohd Zin	3,170	57.23	▲9.87
PN	Abu Hashim Abdul	1,345	24.28	▲24.28
PH	Zairi Suboh	1,024	18.49	▼18.34
Total valid votes		5,539		
Total rejected ballots		109		
Unreturned ballots		12		
Turnout		5,660	65.35	▼17.30
Registered electors		8,661		
Majority		1,825	32.95	▲22.42
BN hold		Swing		
Source(s) https://lom.agc.gov.my/ilims/upload/portal/akta/outputp/1715764/PUB%20583.pdf

Malacca state election, 2018: Taboh Naning
Party	Candidate	Votes	%	∆%
BN	Latipah Omar	3,329	47.36	▼20.25
PKR	Zairi Suboh	2,589	36.83	▲36.83
PAS	Asri Shaik Abdul Aziz	1,111	15.81	▼16.58
Total valid votes		7,029	100.00	
Total rejected ballots		161		
Unreturned ballots		36		
Turnout		7,226	82.65	▼2.31
Registered electors		8,743		
Majority		740	10.53	▼24.69
BN hold		Swing		

Malacca state election, 2013: Taboh Naning
Party	Candidate	Votes	%	∆%
BN	Latipah Omar	4,520	67.61	▼2.82
PAS	Ab Halim Ab Jalil	2,165	32.39	▲2.82
Total valid votes		6,685	100.00	
Total rejected ballots		116		
Unreturned ballots		0		
Turnout		6,801	84.96	▲8.06
Registered electors		8,005		
Majority		2,355	35.22	▼5.64
BN hold		Swing		
Source(s) "Federal Government Gazette - Notice of Contested Election, State Legislative Assembly for the State of Selangor [P.U. (B) 192/2013]" (PDF). Attorney General's Chambers of Malaysia. 26 April 2013. Archived from the original (PDF) on 2019-12-29. "Federal Government Gazette - Results of Contested Election and Statements of the Poll after the Official Addition of Votes, State Constituencies for the State of Selangor [P.U. (B) 233/2013]". Attorney General's Chambers of Malaysia. 22 May 2013. Archived from the original (PDF) on 2018-10-02.

Malacca state election, 2008: Taboh Naning
Party	Candidate	Votes	%	∆%
BN	Latipah Omar	3,873	70.43	▼11.84
PAS	Abdul Halim Said	1,626	29.57	▲11.84
Total valid votes		5,499	100.00	
Total rejected ballots		130		
Unreturned ballots		19		
Turnout		5,648	76.90	▲0.40
Registered electors		7,345		
Majority		2,247	40.86	▼23.68
BN hold		Swing		

Malacca state election, 2004: Taboh Naning
Party	Candidate	Votes	%
BN	Nawi Ahmad	4,552	82.27
PAS	Mohd Ali Ujang	981	17.73
Total valid votes		5,533	100.00
Total rejected ballots		106	
Unreturned ballots		0	
Turnout		5,639	76.50
Registered electors		7,371	
Majority		3,571	64.54

Malacca state election, 1982: Taboh Naning
Party	Candidate	Votes	%
BN	Abdul Razak bin Alias	5,541	69.7
DAP	Woo Hap Hin	2,052	25.8
PAS	Abdul Rahman bin Sulong	356	4.5
Total valid votes		0	
Total rejected ballots		152	
Unreturned ballots		0	
Turnout		8,101	70.7
Registered electors		11,453	
Majority		3,489	43.9
Source(s) https://electiondata.my/ms-MY/seats/dun/n07-gadek-melaka/

Malacca state election, 1978: Taboh Naning
Party	Candidate	Votes	%
BN	Abdul Razak bin Alias	4,117	59.9
DAP	Abdul Rahim bin Basir	2,125	30.9
PAS	Abdul Karim bin Bakar	632	9.2
Total valid votes		0	
Total rejected ballots		382	
Unreturned ballots		0	
Turnout		7,256	73.9
Registered electors		9,823	
Majority		1,992	29.0
Source(s) https://electiondata.my/ms-MY/seats/dun/n07-gadek-melaka/

Malacca state election, 1974: Taboh Naning
Party	Candidate	Votes	%
BN	Abdul Razak bin Alias	5,541	69.7
DAP	Woo Hap Hin	2,052	25.8
PAS	Abdul Rahman bin Sulong	356	4.5
Total valid votes		0	
Total rejected ballots		152	
Unreturned ballots		0	
Turnout		5,639	76.50
Registered electors		11,453	
Majority		3,489	43.9
This was a new constituency created.
Source(s) https://electiondata.my/ms-MY/seats/dun/n07-gadek-melaka/
