= 1963 Pahang Tua by-election =

- 31 March 1963

Pahang Tua seat in Pahang State Legislative Assembly
- Turnout: 79.6
	All	PMIP	SF
Candidate	Mohammed Mokhtar	Abdul Hamid	Tengku Jaafar
Party	UMNO	PMIP	PRM
Alliance	Alliance		SF
Popular vote	4,101	810	211
Percentage	NA	NA	NA
MLA before election
Ahmad Othman
Alliance (UMNO)
Elected MLA
Mohammed Mokhtar
Alliance (UMNO)

The Pahang Tua by-election was a state assembly by-election that was held on 31 March 1963 in the state of Pahang, Malaysia. The Pahang Tua seat fell vacant following the death of its UMNO MLA Ahmad Othman on 2nd February 1963. He won the seat in 1959 Malayan general election.

Mohammed Mokhtar of Alliance, retained the seat, defeating Abdul Hamid of PMIP and Tengku Jaafar of Socialist Front with an increased majority of 3,291 votes.

== Nomination ==
On nomination day, three candidates were confirmed. Alliance nominated former Government servant, Mohammed Mokhtar. PMIP renominated their candidate from 1959 Malayan general election, businessman, Abdul Hamid while Socialist Front renominate then independent candidate, farmer, Tengku Jaafar bin Tengku Ali.

== Results ==
Malaysian general by-election, 31 March 1963: Pahang Tua Upon the death of incumbent, Ahmad Othman
Party	Candidate	Votes	%	∆%
Alliance	Mohammed Mokhtar	4,101	NA	
PAS	Abdul Hamid	810	NA	
Socialist Front	Tengku Jaafar	211	NA	
Total valid votes		NA	NA	
Total rejected ballots		0	NA	
Unreturned ballots		0		
Turnout		5,229	79.60%	
Registered electors		6,500		
Majority		3,291	NA	NA
Alliance hold		Swing		
