= Nazri Abdul Rahman =

Malaysian politician and engineer

Yang Berhormat Tuan Ir. Ts. Haji Nazri Abdul Rahman MLA
- نذري عبد الرحمن

Member of the Johor State Legislative Assembly for Simpang Jeram
- Incumbent
- Assumed office 9 September 2023
- Preceded by: Salahuddin Ayub (PH–AMANAH)
- Majority: 3,514 (2023); 170 (2026)

Faction represented in Johor State Legislative Assembly
- 2023–: Pakatan Harapan

Personal details
- Born: Nazri Abdul Rahman; 1967 (age 58–59) Muar, Johor, Malaysia
- Party: National Trust Party (AMANAH)
- Other political affiliations: Pakatan Harapan (PH)
- Occupation: Politician
- Profession: Engineer

Nazri bin Abdul Rahman (born 1967) is a Malaysian politician and engineer who has served as Member of the Johor State Legislative Assembly (MLA) for Simpang Jeram since September 2023. He is a member and Division Deputy Chief of Bakri of the National Trust Party (AMANAH), a component party of the Pakatan Harapan (PH) coalition. He was Head of the Simpang Jeram Service Centre Economic Bureau and Head of the Engineering Department of the Muar Municipal Council (MPM). He is also presently the only AMANAH Johor MLA.

== Political career ==
=== Member of the Johor State Legislative Assembly (since 2023) ===
==== 2023 Simpang Jeram by-election ====
In the 2023 Simpang Jeram by-election held on 9 September 2023 due to the vacancy of the state seat as a result of the death of its MLA Salahuddin Ayub on 23 July 2023, Nazri made his electoral debut after being nominated by PH to contest the state seat. He won the seat and was elected into the Johor State Legislative Assembly as the Simpang Jeram MLA for the first term after defeating Mohd Mazri Yahya of Perikatan Nasional (PN) and independent candidate S. Jeghanaathan by a majority of 3,514 votes. Nazri attributed his victory to the hard work and strong partnership as well as cooperation between the PH and Barisan Nasional (BN) election machineries. Before and after his election as the Simpang Jeram MLA, he recalled his experience with Salahuddin which the latter had advised him to always serve the Simpang Jeram people and always treat them as his family members. He also noted the advice of Salahuddin that strengthened his perseverance to champion the fate and welfare of the Simpang Jeram people and carry on the legacy of Salahuddin. Moreover, he shared that his experience working with Salahuddin made him more comfortable working behind the scenes, working more and talking less in helping to resolve issues faced by the Simpang Jeram people and improving their welfare and socioeconomics. In addition, he established his priorities as the Simpang Jeram MLA ranging from addressing flood and drainage issues, developing and providing more facilities for young people, looking into the welfare of the elderly, keeping the plans of Salahuddin on track to carrying on the implementation of the Rahmah initiative initiated by Salahuddin. On 14 September 2023, Nazri officially took his oath of office and was sworn in as the Simpang Jeram MLA.

== Personal life ==
Nazri is married to his wife Siti Seri Azura Ahmad.

== Election results ==
Johor State Legislative Assembly
Year	Constituency	Candidate	Votes	Pct	Opponent(s)	Votes	Pct	Ballots cast	Majority	Turnout
2023	N13 Simpang Jeram	Nazri Abdul Rahman (AMANAH)	13,844	56.54%	Mohd Mazri Yahya (PAS)	10,330	42.19%	24,485	3,514	60.64%
2023	N13 Simpang Jeram	Nazri Abdul Rahman (AMANAH)	13,844	56.54%	S. Jeghanaathan (IND)	311	1.27%	24,485	3,514	60.64%
2026	N13 Simpang Jeram	Nazri Abdul Rahman (AMANAH)	12,022	41.03%	Azman Ismail (UMNO)	11,852	40.45%	29,303	170	71.16%
2026	N13 Simpang Jeram	Nazri Abdul Rahman (AMANAH)	12,022	41.03%	Arshed Yahya (PAS)	3,962	13.52%	29,303	170	71.16%
2026	N13 Simpang Jeram	Nazri Abdul Rahman (AMANAH)	12,022	41.03%	Ainie Haziqah Shafii (MUDA)	1,467	5.01%	29,303	170	71.16%
