= 1960 Sri Lalang by-election =

- 22 May 1960

Sri Lalang seat in Johor State Legislative Assembly
- Turnout: 6,656
| | All | SF |
| Candidate | Ong Kai Beng | Mohamed Zain Mohamed |
| Party | MCA | Lab |
| Alliance | Alliance | SF |
| Popular vote | 3,157 | 2,428 |
| Percentage | NA | NA |
MLA before election
Cheong Soo Kheng
Alliance (MCA)
Elected MLA
Ong Kai Beng
Alliance (MCA)

The Sri Lalang by-election was a state assembly by-election that was held on 22 May 1960 in the state of Johor, Malaysia. The Sri Lalang seat fell vacant following the death of its MCA MLA Cheong Soo Kheng which won the seat in 1959 Malayan general election.

Ong Kai Beng of Alliance, won the by election, defeating Mohamed Zain Mohamed of Socialist Front with a slim majority of 729 votes.

== Nomination ==
Nomination day was fixed at 25 April and polling day at 22 May 1960. On nomination day, two candidates were confirmed. Alliance nominated businessman, Ong Kai Beng. Socialist Front also nominated businessman, Mohamed Zain Mohamed.

== Results ==
Malaysian general by-election, 22 May 1960: Sri Lalang Upon the death of incumbent, Cheong Soo Kheng
| Party | Candidate | Votes | % | ∆% |
|---|---|---|---|---|
| Alliance | Ong Kai Beng | 3,157 | NA | |
| Socialist Front | Mohamed Zain Mohamed | 2,428 | NA | |
| Total valid votes | | NA | NA | |
| Total rejected ballots | | 71 | NA | |
| Unreturned ballots | | 0 | | |
| Turnout | | 6,656 | 77.70% | |
| Registered electors | | 7,282 | | |
| Majority | | 729 | NA | NA |
| Alliance gain | | Swing | | {{{3}}} |
