= 1962 Rantau Panjang by-election =

← 1959	2 June 1962	1964 →

Rantau Panjang seat in Kelantan State Legislative Assembly
	PMIP	All
Candidate	Ahmad Yatim	Nik Yusoff
Party	PMIP	UMNO
Alliance		Alliance
Popular vote	2,530	1,479
Percentage	NA	NA
MLA before election
Abdul Rahman Daud
PMIP
Elected MLA
Ahmad Yatim
PMIP

The Rantau Panjang by-election was a state assembly by-election that was held on 2 June 1962 in the state of Kelantan, Malaysia. The Rantau Panjang seat fell vacant following the death of its PMIP MLA Abdul Rahman Daud on 10 March 1962. He won the seat in 1959 Malayan general election with a majority of 1,280 votes.

This is the first election since 1959 Malayan general election which PMIP wrest the state government from Alliance. Ahmad Yatim of PMIP, retained the seat, defeating Nik Yusoff of Alliance with an increased majority of 2,530 votes.

== Nomination ==
On nomination day, two candidates were confirmed. Alliance renominated defeated candidate during 1959 Malayan general election, vice chairmen of UMNO Pasir Mas division, Nik Yusoff. PMIP nominated chairmen of Rantau Panjang PMIP division, Ahmad Yatim.

== Results ==
Malaysian general by-election, 7 April 1968: Rantau Panjang Upon the death of incumbent, Shafie Ahmad
Party	Candidate	Votes	%	∆%
PMIP	Ahmad Yatim	2,530		
Alliance	Nik Yusoff	1,479		
Total valid votes				
Total rejected ballots				
Unreturned ballots				
Turnout				
Registered electors		5,250		
Majority		2,530		
PMIP hold		Swing		
