= 2023 Simpang Jeram by-election =

2023 by-election in Johor, Malaysia

- 9 September 2023

N13 Simpang Jeram seat in the Johor State Legislative Assembly
	First party	Second party
	PH	PN
Candidate	Nazri Abdul Rahman	Mohd Mazri Yahya
Party	AMANAH	PAS
Alliance	PH	PN
Popular vote	13,844	10,330
Percentage	56.54%	42.19%
Simpang Jeram assemblyman before election
Salahuddin Ayub (died)
Pakatan Harapan (AMANAH)
Elected Simpang Jeram assemblyman
Nazri Abdul Rahman
Pakatan Harapan (AMANAH)

The 2023 Simpang Jeram by-election was a by-election held on 9 September 2023 for the Johor State Legislative Assembly seat of Simpang Jeram. It was called following the death of incumbent, Salahuddin Ayub on 23 July 2023. The by-election were held on the same day as the 2023 Pulai by-election. Salahuddin was a 2-term Member of Parliament for Pulai, and also 2-term Member of Johor State Assembly for Simpang Jeram, both since 2018. He was a member and Deputy President (2015-2023) of the National Trust Party (AMANAH), a component party of the Pakatan Harapan (PH) coalition.This also the first elections with incumbent death still hold both parliamentary and state constituencies since Fadzil Noor in 2002.

== Nomination and campaign ==
Nomination day were announced by Election Commission (EC) to be on 26 August 2023. On the nomination day, 3 candidates were accepted: Nazri Abdul Rahman from PH, Mohd Mazri Yahya from Perikatan Nasional (PN), and Jeganathan Subramaniam as an independent.

Nazri were announced as PH candidate in a media conference by AMANAH President, Mohamad Sabu on 19 August. He is the AMANAH deputy chief of Bakri, and an engineer by profession. Nazri has said, in an interview to Bernama, that his main agenda is to solve the drainage problem which led to flash floods at the constituency, as well as improving the local economy. He also promised to continue the groundwork laid by Salahuddin in the constituency.

Mazri, from Parti Islam Se-Malaysia (PAS), was announced as PN's candidate by PN chairman Muhyiddin Yassin on 23 August. A vascular and endovascular surgeon by trade, he is the PAS Central Committee member, and also Johor PAS Deputy Commissioner. He has contested in Simpang Jeram before in 2018, as well as Pulai federal seat in 2018; both which were lost to Salahuddin. Mazri unveiled his manifesto on 6 September, focusing on affordable housing, flash flood solutions, youth sports and recreation program, and more support for people with disabilities in the area.

Jeganathan, a local businessman from Taman Bakri Jaya and former Malaysian Indian Congress member, had participated in the state elections twice before: in 2018 and 2022, both in Bukit Naning state seat. On both occasions, he lost his deposit. He listed his ability to speak English, Malay, Tamil, Mandarin and Hokkien as an advantage for his campaign. Jeganathan also revealed his six-point manifesto, including a food bank with monthly contribution on RM1,000 from him, and emergency van for those in need. Jeganathan decided this would be his last election if he loses again, after spending more than RM50,000 on helping the locals.

Notably, this was the first Johor state election without candidates from Barisan Nasional (BN) since 2004, (Note: The BN candidate nomination for Senggarang in the 2004 Johor state election were rejected on technical grounds by the EC.) traditionally the dominant party in the state and the current state government party. After formation of federal government consisting of the alliance between PH and BN in the aftermath of the general election in November 2022, both Simpang Jeram and Pulai by-election saw the first collaboration between BN and PH at Johor state level, as BN acceded to PH to put its candidate there, as well as campaigning together.

Think tank Nusantara Academy for Strategic Research data analyst, Azlan Musyabri suggests that PN could win both seats, if the voter turnout trend is the same as the 2022 state election, but also suggested PH would retain both seats if BN voters support the PH candidate as well as increase of support from non-Malay voters from the 2022 election. Bridget Welsh, another political analyst based in Kuala Lumpur, predicted the result will hinge on either voters respect for Salahuddin legacy, or voters response to BN and UMNO president Zahid Hamidi discharge not amounting to an acquittal (DNAA) of his 47 court cases just days before the election. Other analysts, such as Dr Azmi Hassan also from Nusantara Academy, and Dr Ainul Adzellie Hasnul, believe that Zahid's DNAA, and also another UMNO leader Bung Mokhtar Radin acquittal of his own court case a day after, will not affect PH-BN negatively in the by-elections.

== Timeline ==
The key dates are listed below.

Date	Event
3 August 2023	Issue of the Writ of Election
26 August 2023	Nomination Day
26 August–8 September 2023	Campaigning Period
9 September 2023	Polling Day

== Results ==
Johor state by-election, 9 September 2023: Simpang Jeram Upon the death of incumbent, Salahuddin Ayub
Party	Candidate	Votes	%	∆%
PH	Nazri Abdul Rahman	13,844	56.54	+15.60
PN	Mohd Mazri Yahya	10,330	42.19	+12.47
Independent	Jeganathan Subramaniam	311	1.27	+1.27
Total valid votes		24,485	100.00	
Total rejected ballots		74		
Unreturned ballots		12		
Turnout		24,571	60.85	
Registered electors		40,379		
Majority		3,514		
PH hold		Swing		
Source(s) https://lom.agc.gov.my/ilims/upload/portal/akta/outputp/1857938/PUB%20400%20(2023).pdf

== Previous results ==
Johor state election, 2022: Simpang Jeram
Party	Candidate	Votes	%
PH	Salahuddin Ayub	8,749	40.94
PN	Zarul Salleh	6,350	29.72
BN	Lokman Md Don	6,062	28.37
Homeland Fighters' Party	Mahaizal Mahmor	208	0.97
Total valid votes		21,369	100.00
Total rejected ballots		387	
Unreturned ballots		141	
Turnout		21,897	54.72
Registered electors		40,014	
Majority		2,399	
PH hold		Swing	

== Aftermath ==
Nazri, the winner of the by-election, were sworn in as the new MLA for Simpang Jeram on 14 September at the third meeting of the second session of the 15th Johor State Assembly.
