= 1966 Sungei Bahru by-election =

- 20 March 1966

Sungei Bahru seat in the Malacca State Legislative Assembly
	All	PMIP	PRM
Candidate	Abdullah Abdul Samad	Taha Kalu	Mohamed Din Daud
Party	UMNO	PMIP	PRM
Alliance	Alliance
Popular vote	4,159	1,062	493
Percentage	NA	NA	NA
MLA before election
Thamby Chik Karim
Alliance (UMNO)
Elected MLA
Abdullah Abdul Samad
Alliance (UMNO)

The Sungei Bahru by-election is a state by-election that was held on 20 March 1966 in the state of Melaka, Malaysia. The Sungei Bahru seat fell vacant following the death of its MLA Mr. Thamby Chik Karim of Alliance. He won the seat in 1964 Malaysian general election with 7,878 majority.

Abdullah Abdul Samad of Alliance, won the by election, defeating Mohamed Din Daud of PRM and Taha Kalu of PMIP with majority of 3,097 votes.

== Nomination ==
Alliance nominated Kampong Pulai branch of Melaka UMNO chairmen, Abdullah Abdul Samad. Parti Rakyat Malaysia nominated the party Melaka chairmen, Mohamed Din Daud while PMIP nominated Melaka representative in PMIP central committee, Taha Kalu.

== Results ==
Malaysian general by-election, 20 March 1966: Sungei Bahru Upon the death of incumbent, Thamby Chik Karim
Party	Candidate	Votes	%	∆%
Alliance	Abdullah Abdul Samad	4,159		
PMIP	Taha Kalu	1,062		
Parti Rakyat Malaysia	Mohamed Din Daud	493		
Total valid votes				
Total rejected ballots				
Unreturned ballots				
Turnout				
Registered electors		7,447		
Majority		3,097		
Alliance hold		Swing		
