= 1987 Bukit Tuku by-election =

Election in Malaysia

← 1986	28 June 1987	1990 →

Bukit Tuku seat in the Kelantan State Legislative Assembly
	BN	PAS	IND
Candidate	Mohamad Zain Ismail	Fatah Harun	Noor Mohamad Din
Party	BN (UMNO)	PAS	Independent
Popular vote	3,790	3,672	970
Percentage	44.95%	43.55%	11.5%
Bukit Tuku assemblyman before election
Zakaria Botok
BN (UMNO)
Elected Bukit Tuku assemblyman
Mohamad Zain Ismail
BN (UMNO)

The 1987 Bukit Tuku by-election is a by-election for the Kelantan State Legislative Assembly state seat of Bukit Tuku, Malaysia that were held on 28 June 1987. It was called following the death of the incumbent, Zakaria Botok on 31 March 1987.

== Background ==
Zakaria Botok, from United Malays National Organization (UMNO), were elected to the Kelantan State Legislative Assembly newly created seat of Bukit Tuku at the 1986 Kelantan state election as a Barisan Nasional (BN) candidate, defeating Pan-Malaysian Islamic Party (PAS) candidate Fatah Harun. Prior to that, he was the incumbent of Gual Periok state seat, which he won in the 1982 Kelantan state election.

On 31 March 1987, Zakaria died at General Hospital, Kota Bharu. He has been admitted to the hospital since August 1986 after being involved in an accident at Pasir Mas-Rantau Panjang highway, where he suffered serious injuries. His death means that Bukit Tuku state seat were vacated. This necessitates for by-election to be held, as the seat were vacated more that 2 years before the expiry of Kelantan assembly current term. Election Commission of Malaysia (SPR) have announced, after an injunction to prevent the by-election that had been filed by Fatah has been lifted, that the by-election for the seat will be held on 28 June 1987, with 16 June 1987 set as the nomination day.

== Nomination and campaign ==
After nomination closed, it was confirmed that there will be a 3-way fight between BN, PAS and independent candidate for the Bukit Tuku seat. BN nominated UMNO Rantau Panjang division youth chief Mohamad Zain Ismail, while PAS re-nominated Fatah as their candidate. A businessman, Noor Mohamad Din also handed his nomination papers as an independent candidate.

In their campaign, BN had claimed that PAS and independent candidates plan to use 'dirty tactics' to help them in the by-election.

== Timeline ==
The key dates are listed below.

Date	Event
	Issue of the Writ of Election
16 June 1987	Nomination Day
16–27 June 1987	Campaigning Period
	Early polling day for postal and overseas voters
28 June 1987	Polling Day

== Results ==
Kelantan state by-election, 28 June 1987: Bukit Tuku The by-election was called due to the death of incumbent, Zakaria Botok.
Party	Candidate	Votes	%	∆%
BN	Mohd Zain Ismail	3,790	44.95	▼7.36
PAS	Abdul Fatah Harun	3,672	43.55	▲4.14
Independent	Noor Mohamad Din	970	11.5	▲11.5
Total valid votes		8,432	100.00	
Total rejected ballots		60		
Unreturned ballots				
Turnout		8,492	74.56	▲0.76
Registered electors		11,389		
Majority		118	1.4	▼3.22
BN hold		Swing		

=== Previous result ===
Kelantan state election, 1986: Bukit Tuku
Party	Candidate	Votes	%	∆%
BN	Zakaria Botok	4,218	52.31	
PAS	Abdul Fatah Harun	3,846	47.69	
Total valid votes		8,064	100.00	
Total rejected ballots		275		
Unreturned ballots		0		
Turnout		8,339	73.80	
Registered electors		11,299		
Majority		372	4.62	
This was a new constituency created.
