= Melekek (state constituency) =

Malacca constituency

Defunct state constituency
- Legislature: Malacca State Legislative Assembly
- Constituency created: 1994
- Constituency abolished: 2004
- First contested: 1995
- Last contested: 1999

Melekek was a state constituency in Malacca, Malaysia, that was represented in the Malacca State Legislative Assembly from 1995 to 2004.

The state constituency was created in the 1994 redistribution and was mandated to return a single member to the Malacca State Legislative Assembly under the first past the post voting system.

== History ==
It was abolished in 2004 when it was redistributed.

=== Representation history ===
Members of the Legislative Assembly for Melekek
Assembly	No	Years	Member	Party
Constituency created from Sungai Bahru and Kelemak
9th	N03	1995–1997	Mohd Zin Mohd Said	BN (UMNO)
9th	N03	1997–1999	Nawi Ahmad	BN (UMNO)
10th	N03	1999–2004	Nawi Ahmad	BN (UMNO)
Constituency split into Taboh Naning and Ayer Limau

== Election results ==
Malacca state election, 1999
Party	Candidate	Votes	%	∆%
BN	Nawi Ahmad	4,153	69.36	▼27.91
PKR	Muhd Zahid Md Arip	1,835	30.64	▲30.64
Total valid votes		5,988	100.00	
Total rejected ballots		157		
Unreturned ballots		0		
Turnout		6,145	75.67	▲14.75
Registered electors		8,121		
Majority		2,318	38.71	▼55.83
BN hold		Swing		

Malacca state by-election, 1997 Upon the death of the incumbent, Mohd Zin Mohd Said
Party	Candidate	Votes	%	∆%
BN	Nawi Ahmad	4,559	97.27	▲6.60
Independent	J. Appalasamy	128	2.73	▲2.73
Total valid votes		4,687	100.00	
Total rejected ballots		110		
Unreturned ballots		0		
Turnout		4,797	60.92	▼13.04
Registered electors		7,874		
Majority		4,431	94.54	▲13.19
BN hold		Swing		

Malacca state election, 1995
Party	Candidate	Votes	%
BN	Mohd Zin Mohd Said	5,006	90.67
PAS	Md Yusof Osman	515	9.33
Total valid votes		5,521	100.00
Total rejected ballots		136	
Unreturned ballots		15	
Turnout		5,672	73.96
Registered electors		7,669	
Majority		4,491	81.34
This was a new constituency created.
