= 1974 Sungei Bahru by-election =

← 1969	18 May 1974	1974 →

N11 Sungai Baharu seat in the Malacca State Legislative Assembly
- Turnout: 71.39%
	All	PKS
Candidate	Johari Yusoff	Abdul Ghani bin Long
Party	UMNO	PEKEMAS
Alliance	Alliance	PEKEMAS
Popular vote	4,568	2,319
Percentage	77.24%	28.00%
MLA before election
Abdullah bin Samad
Alliance (UMNO)
Elected MLA
Johari Yusoff
Alliance (UMNO)

The Sungei Bahru state by-election is a state by-election that was scheduled to be held on 18 May 1974 in the state of Malacca, Malaysia. The Sungei Bahru seat fell vacant following the death of its state assemblyman Tuan Haji Abdullah bin Samad of United Malays National Organisation in Malacca. Abdullah won the seat in 1969 Malaysian state elections against Ali bin Md Salleh of PAS with majority of 2,063.

Johari Yusoff of Alliance, won the by election, defeating Abdul Ghani bin Long of Malaysian Social Justice Party with a majority of 3,222 votes. The state assembly seat has some 8,434 voters consisting of 500 Malays and 2,000 Chinese.

== Nomination ==
On 1 May 1974, Alliance nominated Johari Yusoff, a lecturer with Universiti Malaya until his retirement and former chairmen of UMNO Pengkalan Balak. Malaysian Social Justice Party nominated business man from Ramuan China and former Alliance district councillor, Abdul Ghani bin Long. He was also chairmen of PEKEMAS Ramuan China Kecil and a member of party state liaison committee.

On Nomination Day, the race was confirmed to be a straight fight between Johari Yusoff of Alliance and Abdul Ghani bin Long of PEKEMAS after nominations closed

== Results ==
Candidate	Party	Votes	%
Johari Yusoff	Alliance Party	4,568	77.24
Abdul Ghani bin Long	Malaysian Social Justice Party	1,346	22.76
Total		5,914	100.00
Valid votes		5,914	98.22
Invalid/blank votes		107	1.78
Total votes		6,021	100.00
Registered voters/turnout		8,434	71.39
Majority		3,222	
Alliance hold			
Source: Official Year Book
