= 1986 Bandar Maran by-election =

1986 Maran by-election
- 25 January 1986

Bandar Maran seat in the Pahang State Legislative Assembly
| | BN |
| Candidate | Ayub Teh |
| Party | UMNO |
| Alliance | BN |
| Popular vote | Won uncontested |
| Percentage | Won uncontested |
MP before election
Jalil Mohd Seh
BN (UMNO)
Elected MP
Ayub Teh
BN (UMNO)

The Maran by-election is a state seat by-election that was scheduled to be held in January 1986 in the state of Pahang, Malaysia. The Pahang seat fell vacant from 13 December 1985 following the death of its member of state assembly Abd Jalil Mohammad Seh of Barisan Nasional (UMNO) in Pahang.

Ayub Teh, of Barisan Nasional won the by election uncontested, as he was the sole nominee during nomination day on 5 January 1986.

== Nomination ==
Prior the by-election, the Malaysian Nationalist Party announced it will contest the seat. Independent candidate, Kong Ah Kow, withdrew minutes before nomination closed. By the end of nomination day, Ayub won as being the sole candidate.

== Timeline ==
The key dates are listed below.

| Date | Event |
|---|---|
| 4 January 1986 | Issue of the Writ of Election |
| 13 January 1986 | Nomination Day |
| 14 January – 24 January 1986 | Campaigning Period |
| 23–24 January 1986 | Early polling day for postal and overseas voters |
| 25 January 1986 | Polling Day |

== Results ==
Pahang state by-election, 25 January 1986: Bandar Maran Upon the death of incumbent, Jalil Mohd Seh
| Party | Candidate | Votes | % | ∆% |
|---|---|---|---|---|
On the nomination day, Ayub Teh won uncontested.
| BN | Ayub Teh | | | |
| Total valid votes | | | 100.00 | |
| Total rejected ballots | | | | |
| Unreturned ballots | | | | |
| Turnout | | | | |
| Registered electors | | | | |
| Majority | | | | |
| BN hold | | Swing | | |
