= 1986 Batang Ai by-election =

Election in Malaysia

← 1983	29–30 August 1986	1987 →

Batang Ai seat in the Sarawak State Legislative Assembly
	IND	BN	IND
Candidate	Mikai Mandau	Albert Klingsing Manau	Dakau Sutik
Party	Independent	BN (SNAP)	Independent
Popular vote	2,342	1,939	84
Percentage	52.04%	43.09%	1.87%
	IND	IND	IND
Candidate	Pok Ungkut	Ronaldson Ranggau Basan	Lim Ah San
Party	Independent	Independent	Independent
Popular vote	59	46	30
Percentage	1.31%	1.02%	0.67%
Batang Ai assemblyman before election
Sylvester Langit
BN (SNAP)
Elected Batang Ai assemblyman
Mikai Mandau
Independent

The 1986 Batang Ai by-election is a by-election for the Sarawak State Legislative Assembly state seat of Batang Ai, Malaysia that were held on 29 and 30 August 1986. It was called following the death of the incumbent, Sylvester Langit on 1 June 1986.

== Background ==
Sylvester anak Langit, a candidate of Barisan Nasional (BN), were first elected the Sarawak state seat of Batang Air at the 1983 Sarawak state election, defeating two other candidates by a slim 8 votes majority. He were the Youth vice-chief of BN's component party Sarawak National Party (SNAP).

On 1 June 1986, Sylvester were killed after being involved in a car accident. His death means that his Batang Ai state seat were vacated. This necessitates for a by-election to be held, as the seat were vacated more that 2 years before the expiry of the Sarawak state assembly current term. Election Commission of Malaysia (SPR) announced that the by-election will be held on 29 and 30 August 1986, with 18 August 1986 set as the nomination day.

== Nomination and campaign ==
After nomination closed, it was confirmed there will be a 6-way battle between BN and 5 independent candidates for the Batang Ai seat. BN nominated Albert Klingsing anak Manau, chief of SNAP Lubok Antu division and a former Marine Police officer. Independent candidates include Mikai anak Mandau, a former state government officer and also former Batang Ai assemblyman from 1982 to 1983 after he won the 1982 Batang Ai by-election; Ronaldson Ranggau anak Basan, a farmer; self-employed Dakau anak Sutik; businessman Lim Ah San; and wholesaler Pok anak Ungkut.

== Timeline ==
The key dates are listed below.

Date	Event
	Issue of the Writ of Election
18 August 1986	Nomination Day
18 - 28 August 1986	Campaigning Period
	Early polling day for postal and overseas voters
29 - 30 August 1986	Polling Day

== Results ==
Sarawak state by-election, 29-30 August 1986: Batang Ai Upon the death of incumbent, Sylvester Langit
Party	Candidate	Votes	%	∆%
Independent	Mikai Mandau	2,342	52.04	
BN	Albert Klingsing Manau	1,939	43.09	
Independent	Dakau Sutik	84	1.87	
Independent	Pok Ungkut	59	1.31	
Independent	Ronaldson Ranggau Basan	46	1.02	
Independent	Lim Ah San	30	0.67	
Total valid votes		4,500	100.00	
Total rejected ballots		26		
Unreturned ballots		N/A		
Turnout		4,526	74.9	
Registered electors		6,042		
Majority		403		
Independent gain from SNAP		Swing	N/A	

=== Previous result ===
Sarawak state election, 1983: Batang Ai
Party	Candidate	Votes	%	∆%
SNAP	Sylvester Langit Uming	1,421	36.98	
PBDS	David Jemut	1,413	36.77	
Independent	Benedict Bujang Tembak	1,009	26.26	
Total valid votes		3,843	100.00	
Total rejected ballots				
Unreturned ballots				
Turnout				
Registered electors				
Majority		8		
SNAP gain from Independent		Swing	N/A	
