= 2002 Ketari by-election =

By-election in Malaysia in 2002

- 1 April 2002

N20 Ketari seat in the Pahang State Legislative Assembly
- Turnout: 12,251
	BN	DAP
Candidate	Yum Ah Ha	Choong Siew Onn
Party	GERAKAN	DAP
Alliance	BN	Barisan Alternatif
Popular vote	7,153	6,732
Percentage	58.39%	49.47%
MLA before election
Loke Koon Kam
BN (GERAKAN)
Elected MLA
Yum Ah Ha
BN (GERAKAN)

The 2002 Ketari by-election was a by-election that was held on 1 April 2002 for the Pahang State Legislative Assembly seat of Ketari. It was called following the death of its Barisan Nasional assemblyman Loke Koon Kam on 3 March 2002. Loke won the seat on 1999 Malaysian state elections against Choong Siew Onn of Democratic Action Party with a majority of 231.

Yum Ah Ha of Barisan Nasional retain the seat against DAP Choong Siew Onn with a 10 times increase in majority of 2,204 votes.

== Nomination ==
On nomination day, Barisan Nasional nominated chairmen of GERAKAN Ketari division, Yum Ah Ha. DAP nominated Choong Siew Onn for the third straight time.

== Results ==
Pahang state by-election, 1 April 2002: Ketari upon the death of incumbent Loke Koon Kam
Party	Candidate	Votes	%	∆%
BN	Yum Ah Ha	7,153	58.39	
DAP	Choong Siew Onn	4,949	40.40	
Total valid votes		12,102	98.78	
Total rejected ballots		149	1.22	
Unreturned ballots		0		
Turnout		12,251	71.48	
Registered electors		15,759		
Majority		2,204	17.99	
BN hold		Swing		
