= 1982 Kepayang by-election =

Election in Malaysia

← 1982	16 October 1982	1986 →

Kepayang seat in the Perak State Legislative Assembly
	DAP	BN
Candidate	Lau Dak Kee	Ng Yok Kooi
Party	DAP	BN (MCA)
Popular vote	16,246	6,482
Percentage	70.6%	28.17%
Kepayang assemblyman before election
Lim Cho Hock
DAP
Elected Kepayang assemblyman
Lau Dak Kee
DAP

The 1982 Kepayang by-election is a by-election for the Perak State Legislative Assembly seat of Kepayang that were held on 16 October 1982. It was called following the resignation of the incumbent, Lim Cho Hock on 1 September 1982.

== Background ==
Lim Cho Hock, from Democratic Action Party (DAP), were re-elected to the state seat of Kepayang in the 1982 Perak state election held on 22 April 1982, defeating 2 other candidates in a slim 161 votes majority. A member of the party's central executive council, he is also the chairman of DAP Ipoh branch and DAP Ipoh liaison committee. Lim also has held the DAP deputy secretary -general position from 1974 to 1979, and DAP national vice-chairman from 1979 until his resignation the week before his state seat resignation. Lim were the DAP Perak chairman from 1967, the year he joined the party, until after the 1982 election, when he resigned after the poor showing of DAP in the state and general elections, including his defeat in Ipoh federal seat to Barisan Nasional (BN) candidate. He formerly were member of parliament for Batu Gajah (elected in 1969), Ipoh (elected in 1974 and 1978); as well as state assemblyman for Tanjung Tualang (elected 1969) and Kepayang (elected in 1974 and 1978).

On 1 September 1982, nearly 4 months after the election, Lim resigned from his Kepayang state seat, as well as all his party posts. He claimed that his resignation were caused by 'attacks' by people within the party that he branded as 'traitors' to the party cause. His resignation were accepted by the State Speaker on the same day. Lim's resignation were followed the next day by the resignation of all party officials in Ipoh branch that Lim previously led.

This necessitates for by-election for the seat to be held, as the seat were vacated more that 2 years before the expiry of the state assembly current term. The dates for the by-election and nomination were announced by the Election Commission of Malaysia on 9 September 1982.

== Nomination and campaign ==
Barisan Nasional had announced its intention to contest the by-election, with BN Perak chairman Wan Mohamed Wan Teh claiming the resignation showed DAP's downfall in Perak. BN nominated Ng Yok Kooi, a businessman and Youth chairman for Malaysian Chinese Association (MCA) Ipoh branch.

DAP also said that it will defend the seat, and confident of its success in the by-election. DAP nominated Lau Dak Kee, the party's Ipoh branch youth chairman for the seat.

On the nomination day, it were confirmed there will be a straight fight between DAP and BN for the seat.

The Straits Times reporter for Malaysia, Ismail Kassim, views that the by-election will focus on which party best represents the Chinese-majority seat between the DAP who performed poorly in the last election in the state, against MCA who made major gains in the state in the last election.

== Timeline ==
The key dates are listed below.

Date	Event
	Issue of the Writ of Election
30 September 1982	Nomination Day
30 September - 15 October 1982	Campaigning Period
	Early polling day for postal and overseas voters
16 October 1982	Polling Day

== Results ==
Perak state by-election, 16 October 1982: Kepayang Upon the resignation of incumbent, Lim Cho Hock
Party	Candidate	Votes	%	∆%
DAP	Lau Dak Kee	16,246	70.6	▲22.5
BN	Ng Yok Kooi	6,482	28.17	▼19.36
Total valid votes		22,728	98.77	
Total rejected ballots		283	1.23	
Unreturned ballots		?		
Turnout		23,012	59.9	▼13.74
Registered electors		38,418		
Majority		9,764	?	?
DAP hold		Swing		?

== Previous result ==
Perak state election, 1982: Kepayang
Party	Candidate	Votes	%	∆%
DAP	Lim Cho Hock	13,614	48.1	
BN	Lam Kam Wah	13,453	47.53	
Independent	Leong Wai Man	753	2.66	
Total valid votes		27,820	98.29	
Total rejected ballots		484	1.71	
Unreturned ballots		0	0.00	
Turnout		28,304	73.64	
Registered electors		38,418		
Majority		161		
DAP hold		Swing		?
Source(s) "ELECTION '82 RESULTS".
