= 1981 Engkilili by-election =

Election in Malaysia

| ← 1979 | 4–5 September 1981 | 1983 → |

Engkilili seat in the Sarawak State Legislative Assembly
| | BN | IND |
| Candidate | Jonathan Narwin | Entau Mengga |
| Party | BN (SNAP) | IND |
| Popular vote | 2,536 | 1,216 |
| Percentage | 67.59% | 32.41% |
Engkilili assemblyman before election
Nadeng Linggoh
BN (SNAP)
Elected Engkilili assemblyman
Jonathan Narwin
BN (SNAP)

The 1981 Engkilili by-election is a by-election for the Sarawak State Legislative Assembly state seat of Engkilili, Malaysia that were held on 4 and 5 September 1981. It was called following the death of the incumbent, Nadeng Linggoh on 22 July 1981.

== Background ==
Nadeng anak Linggoh, a member of Sarawak National Party (SNAP), were first elected the Sarawak state seat of Engkilili-Skrang at the 1974 Sarawak state election. He successfully defended the seat, now renamed as Engkilili at the 1979 Sarawak state election. By this time he were a Barisan Nasional (BN) candidate, as SNAP joined the national coalition 3 years earlier.

On 22 July 1981, Nadeng died; this results in his Engkilili seat being vacated. This necessitates for a by-election to be held, as the seat was vacated more that two years before the expiry of the Sarawak state assembly current term. Election Commission of Malaysia (SPR) announced that the by-election will be held on 4 and 5 September 1981, with 20 August 1981 set as the nomination day.

== Nomination and campaign ==
After the agreement between parties in BN Sarawak that a candidate from SNAP will be nominated for the by-election, Jonathan Narwin anak Tinggong, the member of Parliament for Lubok Antu, were announced as candidate for the seat. Entau anak Mengga, a local farmer, also nominated himself as and independent candidate. A former SNAP member that has failed to secure his party's nomination, he were sacked from the party after announcing his candidacy.

After nomination closed on 20 August 1981, it was confirmed Jonathan and Entau will contest the by-election in a straight fight.

== Timeline ==
The key dates are listed below.

| Date | Event |
|---|---|
| | Issue of the Writ of Election |
| 20 August 1981 | Nomination Day |
| 20 August - 3 September 1981 | Campaigning Period |
| | Early polling day for postal and overseas voters |
| 4-5 September 1981 | Polling Day |

== Results ==
Sarawak state by-election, 4-5 September 1981: Engkilili Upon the death of incumbent, Nadeng Linggoh
| Party | Candidate | Votes | % | ∆% |
|---|---|---|---|---|
| BN | Jonathan Narwin | 2,536 | 67.59 | NA |
| Independent | Entau Mengga | 1,216 | 32.41 | NA |
| Total valid votes | | 3,752 | 100.00 | |
| Total rejected ballots | | 108 | | |
| Unreturned ballots | | | | |
| Turnout | | 3,860 | 63.34 | |
| Registered electors | | 6,094 | | |
| Majority | | 1,320 | | |
| BN hold | | Swing | | ? |

=== Previous result ===
Sarawak state election, 1979: Engkilili
| Party | Candidate | Votes | % | ∆% |
|---|---|---|---|---|
| BN | Nadeng Linggoh | 2,583 | 60.68 | |
| Independent | Luta Majeng | 1,674 | 39.32 | |
| Total valid votes | | 4,257 | 100.00 | |
| Total rejected ballots | | 124 | | |
| Unreturned ballots | | 0 | | |
| Turnout | | 4,381 | 73.62 | |
| Registered electors | | 5,951 | | |
| Majority | | 909 | | |
This was a new constituency created.

== Aftermath ==
After Jonathan was announced as the winner, BN Sarawak director of operations for the by-election and Sarawak Deputy Chief Minister, Daniel Tajem, commented that BN's win reflected the political maturity of the voters. SNAP sectetary-general Leo Moggie said the win shows support of state and federal BN from the rural voters. Leo and Parti Pesaka Bumiputera Bersatu (PBB) vice-president Alfred Jabu also said that the win were the result of all BN Sarawak component parties, namely SNAP, PBB and Sarawak United Peoples' Party (SUPP), efforts in campaigning together.
