= 2009 Permatang Pasir by-election =

2009 by-election in Penang, Malaysia

- 25 August 2009

N11 Permatang Pasir seat in the Penang State Legislative Assembly
	PAS	BN
Candidate	Mohd Salleh Man	Rohaizat Othman
Party	PAS	UMNO
Alliance	PR	BN
Popular vote	9,618	5,067
Percentage	65.50%	34.50%
Permatang Pasir assemblyman before election
Mohd Hamdan Abdul Rahman (died)
Pakatan Rakyat (PAS)
Elected Permatang Pasir assemblyman
Mohd Salleh Man
Pakatan Rakyat (PAS)

A by-election was held on 25 August 2009 for the Penang State Legislative Assembly seat of Permatang Pasir. The seat fell vacant after the death of the incumbent assemblyman, Mohd Hamdan Abdul Rahman.

== Result ==
Mohd Salleh Man got 9,618 votes, beating Rohaizat Othman who got 5,067 votes.

Penang state by-election, 25 August 2009: Permatang Pasir The by-election was called due to the death of incumbent, Mohd Hamdan Abdul Rahman.
Party	Candidate	Votes	%	∆%
PAS	Mohd Salleh Man	9,618	65.50	▼0.90
BN	Rohaizat Othman	5,067	34.50	▲0.90
Total valid votes		14,685	100.00	
Total rejected ballots		83		
Unreturned ballots		1		
Turnout		14,769	72.79	▼9.81
Registered electors		20,290		
Majority		4,551	31.00	▼2.80
PAS hold		Swing		
Source(s) "Pilihan Raya Kecil N.11 Permatang Pasir". Election Commission of Malaysia.

== Previous result ==
Penang state election, 2008: Permatang Pasir
Party	Candidate	Votes	%	∆%
PAS	Mohd Hamdan Abdul Rahman	11,004	66.40	▲14.20
BN	Ahmad Sahar Shuib	5,571	32.60	▼14.20
Total valid votes		16,575	100.00	
Total rejected ballots		227		
Unreturned ballots		1		
Turnout		16,803	82.60	▲0.60
Registered electors		20,350		
Majority		5,433	33.80	▲29.40
PAS hold		Swing		
