= 1968 Bachok Utara by-election =

- 7 April 1968

Bachok Utara seat in Kelantan State Legislative Assembly
- Turnout: 74%
	PMIP	All
Candidate	Mohammed Mokhtar	Ismail Mamat
Party	PMIP	UMNO
Alliance		Alliance
Popular vote	4,470	3,997
Percentage	55.11	49.28
MLA before election
Shafie Ahmad
PMIP
Elected MLA
Mohammed Nor
PMIP

The Bachok Utara by-election was a state assembly by-election that was held on 7 April 1968 in the state of Kelantan, Malaysia. The Bachok Utara seat fell vacant following the death of its PMIP MLA Shafie Ahmad on 7th February 1968 due to stroke. He won the seat in 1964 Malaysian general election with a majority of 1,724 votes.

Mohammed Nor of PMIP, retained the seat, defeating Ismail Mamat of Alliance with a reduced majority of 473 votes.

== Nomination ==
On nomination day, two candidates were confirmed. Alliance nominated religious teacher, Ismail Mamat. PMIP nominated businessman, Mohammed Nor.

== Results ==
Malaysian general by-election, 7 April 1968: Bachok Utara Upon the death of incumbent, Shafie Ahmad
Party	Candidate	Votes	%	∆%
PMIP	Mohammed Nor	4,470	55.11	
Alliance	Ismail Mamat	3,997	49.28	
Total valid votes		7,950	98.01	
Total rejected ballots		161	1.98	
Unreturned ballots		0		
Turnout		8,111	74.00	
Registered electors		10,961		
Majority		473		
PMIP hold		Swing		
