= 1995 Sulabayan by-election =

Election in Malaysia

- 28 January 1995

Sulabayan seat in the Sabah State Legislative Assembly
	BN	IND	IND
Candidate	Nasir Sakaran	Abdul Aziz Abdul Hamid	Jatlani Ibnu Sarin
Party	BN (UMNO)	Independent	Independent
Popular vote	8,764	2,751	155
Percentage	73.25%	23.00%	1.30%
	IND
Candidate	Amir Salleh Abdul Rahman
Party	Independent
Popular vote	103
Percentage	0.86%
Sulabayan assemblyman before election
Sakaran Dandai
BN (UMNO)
Elected Sulabayan assemblyman
Nasir Sakaran
BN (UMNO)

The 1995 Sulabayan by-election is a by-election for the Sabah State Legislative Assembly seat of Sulabayan that were held on 28 January 1995. It was called following the resignation of the incumbent, Sakaran Dandai on 27 December 1994.

== Background ==
Sakaran Dandai, the leader of United Malays National Organisation (UMNO) in Sabah, were elected to the state seat of Sulabayan in the 1994 Sabah state election on February under Barisan Nasional (BN) banner. He defeats 3 other candidates with a 3,149 votes majority, as Parti Bersatu Sabah (PBS) won the election with a narrow majority to continue governing the state. However, less than a month later, defections by several elected PBS assemblymen to BN results in PBS losing its majority in the Sabah State Legislative Assembly and were forced out of power. BN forms the new government in Sabah on 17 March, and Sakaran were sworn in as the new Chief Minister on the same day.

On 20 December 1994, only 9 months into his tenure as Chief Minister, Sakaran resigned from his Sulabayan state seat, as well as Semporna federal seat and all his party and state posts. He had announced his official intention to resign on that date, to the UMNO Sabah liaison committee members in a meeting. His resignation were accepted on the next day by BN chairman. Sakaran's resignation were made effective on 27 December 1994, as he hands over the Chief Minister role to the newly appointed Salleh Said Keruak. Sakaran were widely expected to be appointed as the new Yang di-Pertua Negeri of Sabah, which he does on 1 January 1995. The resignation of Sakaran's state seat necessitates for by-election to be held, as the seat were vacated more that 2 years before the expiry of the state assembly current term.

The dates for the by-election and nomination were announced by the Election Commission of Malaysia (SPR) on 30 December 1994.

== Nomination and campaign ==
Barisan Nasional announced they will field Sakaran's son, Nasir in the by-election. This is the second time Nasir has stand in a by-election after his father resigned from a state seat; the first time was in 1990 Sulabayan by-election, after Sakaran were appointed as federal minister and had to resign his seat. Nasir, then under United Sabah National Organisation (USNO), won the by-election, and held the seat until his father again stands in Sulabayan, after USNO and Sabah People's United Front (BERJAYA) merged in 1991 to form UMNO Sabah, for the 1994 state election. PBS, now the main opposition in the Sabah assembly, has stated that they would not contest in the by-election, due to protest against SPR for using outdated 1993 electoral roll instead of the new 1994 roll.

After the nominations closed on 16 January, it was confirmed the will be a contest between BN candidate and 3 other independent candidates for the seat. Of the independent candidates, 2 of them, Jatlani Ibnu Sarin and Amir Salleh Abdul Rahman announced their support for BN and withdraws from the by-election; however their name and symbols will still appears on the vote paper as their announcement was made after nomination period is closed.

== Timeline ==
The key dates are listed below.

Date	Event
9 January 1995	Issue of the Writ of Election
16 January 1995	Nomination Day
16-27 January 1995	Campaigning Period
	Early polling day for postal and overseas voters
28 January 1995	Polling Day

== Results ==
Sabah state by-election, 28 January 1995: Sulabayan Upon the resignation of incumbent, Sakaran Dandai
Party	Candidate	Votes	%	∆%
BN	Nasir Sakaran	8,764	73.25	▲13.45
Independent	Abdul Aziz Abdul Hamid	2,751	23.00	▲23.00
Independent	Jatlani Ibnu Sarin	155	1.30	▲1.30
Independent	Amir Salleh Abdul Rahman	103	0.86	▲0.86
Total valid votes		11,773	98.41	
Total rejected ballots		192	1.59	
Unreturned ballots		?		
Turnout		11,965	66.4	▼4.19
Registered electors		18,020		
Majority		6,013	?	?
BN hold		Swing		?

== Previous result ==
Sabah state election, 1994: Sulabayan
Party	Candidate	Votes	%	∆%
BN	Sakaran Dandai	7,440	59.80	▲9.91
PBS	Abdillah Abdul Hamid	4,291	34.49	▲7.83
BERSEKUTU	Abdul Rajin Mandul Hati	350	2.81	▲2.81
Independent	Kiling Tiring	65	0.52	▲0.52
Total valid votes		12,146	97.62	
Total rejected ballots		296	2.38	
Unreturned ballots		0	0.00	
Turnout		12,442	70.59	▲0.53
Registered electors		17,626		
Majority		3,149	25.31	▲2.08
BN gain from USNO		Swing		?
Source(s) "KEPUTUSAN PILIHAN RAYA UMUM DEWAN UNDANGAN NEGERI SABAH BAGI TAHUN 1994".

== Aftermath ==
Mahathir Mohamad, Prime Minister of Malaysia and BN chairman said that the win by Nasir indicates Sabahan people's greater confidence in the party.
