= Ismail Yaacob =

Malaysian politician (1949–2009)

Ismail Yaacob (1949–2009) was a Manek Urai state assembly representative.

Ismail, who was deputy head of the Kuala Krai PAS division, won the Manek Urai seat in 1985 and had been the elected representative there for five terms. In 2004, he did not contest the seat but did so in 2008, defeating Mohamed Zulkepli Omar of Barisan Nasional with a majority of 1,352 votes. He was one of the longest-serving PAS elected representatives in Kelantan.

On 21 May 2009, Ismail died at 5:55 a.m. at the Raja Perempuan Zainab II Hospital where he had been admitted since April for diabetes, heart ailments and gout. He left behind his wife, Siti Zaharah Ibrahim, and 10 children.
