= 1981 Ulu Muar by-election =

Election in Malaysia

← 1978	Not contested (scheduled on 3 October 1981)	1982 →

Ulu Muar seat in the Negeri Sembilan State Legislative Assembly
	BN
Candidate	Ali Manat
Party	BN (UMNO)
Popular vote	N/A
Percentage	N/A
Ulu Muar assemblyman before election
Abdul Kadir Abdullah
BN (UMNO)
Elected Ulu Muar assemblyman
Ali Manat
BN (UMNO)

The 1981 Ulu Muar by-election is a by-election for the Negeri Sembilan State Legislative Assembly state seat of Ulu Muar, Malaysia that were scheduled to be held on 3 October 1981. It was called following the death of the incumbent, Abdul Kadir Abdullah on 9 August 1981.

== Background ==
Abdul Kadir Abdullah, a candidate of Barisan Nasional (BN), were first elected the Negeri Sembilan state seat of Ulu Muar at the 1964 Negeri Sembilan state election, and defended the seat for 3 consecutive elections. He were the member of BN's component party United Malays National Organization (UMNO). He were appointed the State Executive Councillor in 1969, and were appointed the State Legislative Assembly Speaker in 1974.

On 9 August 1981, Abdul Kadir died at General Hospital, Kangar after suffering a heart attack. He were in Kangar, Perlis to attend the annual State Assembly Speakers conference from 9-12 August. His death means that his state seat of Ulu Muar is to be vacated. This necessitates for a by-election to be held, as the seat were vacated more that 2 years before the expiry of the state assembly current term. Election Commission of Malaysia (SPR) announced that the by-election will be held on 3 October 1981, with 17 September 1981 set as the nomination day.

== Nomination and campaign ==
BN nominated Ali Manat, a teacher by profession, the Kuala Pilah UMNO Youth chief and Negeri Sembilan UMNO Youth deputy chief, as candidate for the by-election. His candidacy was announced by Musa Hitam, the deputy president of UMNO and the Deputy Prime Minister of Malaysia, at Bahau on 6 September 1981. Pan-Malaysian Islamic Party (PAS) also announced its intention to contest the by-election. Democratic Action Party (DAP) who earlier also have registered its interest, announced on 7 September 1981 it will not contest the by-election, as a solidarity to fellow opposition PAS candidacy, and to pool its resources in the upcoming general and state elections.

On the nomination day 17 September 1981, both Ali Manat from BN and Ujang Yatim from PAS handed their nomination papers. However Ujang's nomination were rejected on technical grounds involving one of his proposers, and after nomination period closed, SPR announced Ali Manat won the seat unopposed.

== Timeline ==
The key dates are listed below.

Date	Event
	Issue of the Writ of Election
17 September 1981	Nomination Day
17 - 2 October 1981	Campaigning Period
	Early polling day for postal and overseas voters
3 October 1981	Polling Day

== Results ==
Negeri Sembilan state by-election, 3 October 1981: Ulu Muar Upon the death of incumbent, Abdul Kadir Abdullah
Party	Candidate	Votes	%	∆%
On the nomination day, Ali Manat won uncontested.
BN	Ali Manat			
Total valid votes			100.00	
Total rejected ballots				
Unreturned ballots				
Turnout				
Registered electors		6,898		
Majority				
BN hold		Swing	N/A	
