= 1980 Sugut by-election =

1980 Sugut in Sabah, Malaysia

- 21-24 May 1980

Sugut seat in the Sabah State Legislative Assembly
	BERJAYA	IND
Candidate	Pengiran Khafid Pengiran Salleh	Buangan Gawat
Party	BERJAYA	Independent
Alliance	BN
Popular vote	1,481	410
Percentage	73.98%	20.48%
Sugut assemblyman before election
Betua Abbah
BERJAYA
Elected Sugut assemblyman
Pengiran Khafid Pengiran Salleh
BERJAYA

The 1980 Sugut by-election is a by-election for the Sabah State Legislative Assembly seat of Sugut that were held from 21 to 24 May 1980. It was called following the resignation of the incumbent, Betua Abbah on 11 March 1980.

The by election were held on the same dates as 1980 Kemabong by-election.

== Background ==
Betua Abbah, were elected to the state seat of Sugut in the 1976 Sabah state election, winning the seat as a United Sabah National Organization (USNO) candidate, as Sabah People's United Front (BERJAYA) won the state election to become the new government party of Sabah. He later joined BERJAYA after the election.

On 11 March 1980, Chief Minister of Sabah and BERJAYA President, Harris Salleh announced that Betua and Kemabong assemblyman Asmawi Chew have resigned from their state seats. Harris stated the reason given for Betua resignation was for health reasons, and to make way for a 'young and energetic candidate'. This necessitates for by-election for both seats to be held, as the seats were vacated more that 2 years before the expiry of the state assembly current term.

Election Commission of Malaysia announced on 4 April 1980 that the by-election for the seat will be held from 21 to 24 May 1980 if there is a contest, with 26 April 1980 set as the nomination day.

== Nomination and campaign ==
After both BERJAYA resignations, USNO said that they would not contest the by-elections, to focus their resources in the upcoming state election.

After nominations at Beluran district office closed on 27 April 1980, it was confirmed there would be a straight fight between BERJAYA and independent for the Sugut seat. BERJAYA named businessman Pengiran Abdul Khafid bin Pengiran Salleh, while an independent candidate Buangan bin Gawat also handed his nomination. Pengiran Khafid previously had lost to Betua in the 1976 state elections.

== Timeline ==
The key dates are listed below.

Date	Event
	Issue of the Writ of Election
26 April 1980	Nomination Day
26 April-20 May 1980	Campaigning Period
	Early polling day for postal and overseas voters
21-24 May 1980	Polling Day

== Results ==
Sabah state by-election, 21-24 May 1980: Sugut Upon the resignation of incumbent, Betua Abbah
Party	Candidate	Votes	%	∆%
BERJAYA	Pengiran Khafid Pengiran Salleh	1,481	73.98	▲43.25
Independent	Buangan Gawat	410	20.48	▲20.48
Total valid votes		1,891	94.46	
Total rejected ballots		111	5.54	
Unreturned ballots		0	0.00	
Turnout		2,002	42.7	▼28.44
Registered electors		4,689		
Majority		1,071	?	?
BERJAYA gain from USNO		Swing		?

== Previous result ==
Sabah state election, 1976: Sugut
Party	Candidate	Votes	%	∆%
USNO	Betua Abbah	1,837	66.48	
BERJAYA	Pengiran Khafid Pengiran Salleh	849	30.73	
Total valid votes		2,686	97.21	
Total rejected ballots		77	2.79	
Unreturned ballots		0	0.00	
Turnout		2,763	71.14	
Registered electors		3,884		
Majority		988		
USNO hold		Swing		?
Source(s) "SABAH_1976_DUN_RESULTS".

== Aftermath ==
After BERJAYA candidates were announced as winners, the party president Harris said in an interview that voters have reached political maturity and would not be swayed by opposition propaganda.

Pengiran Khafid would successfully defend the seat in the next year's state election.
