= 1983 Kenering by-election =

Election in Malaysia

← 1982	9 April 1983	1986 →

Kenering seat in the Perak State Legislative Assembly
	BN	PAS
Candidate	Johan Lahamat	Mohd Arif Yaacob
Party	BN (UMNO)	PAS
Popular vote	6,116	2,538
Percentage	70.67%	29.33%
Kenering assemblyman before election
Wan Mohamed Wan Teh
BN (UMNO)
Elected Kenering assemblyman
Johan Lahamat
BN (UMNO)

The 1983 Kenering by-election is a by-election for the Perak State Legislative Assembly seat of Kenering in Perak, Malaysia that were held on 9 April 1983. It was called following the resignation of the incumbent, Wan Mohamed Wan Teh on 22 February 1983.

== Background ==
Wan Mohamed Wan Teh was first elected to the Perak State Legislative Assembly seat of Gerik at the 1974 Perak state election, as a candidate for Barisan Nasional (BN) . He were later appointed as Menteri Besar of Perak in 1977, after the resignation of Mohamad Ghazali Jawi. Wan Mohamed won the state seat of Temenggor in the 1978 Perak state election, and won the state seat of Kenering in the 1982 Perak state election.

On 22 February 1983, Wan Mohamed tendered his resignation as Menteri Besar of Perak, and also his state seat of Kenering, for health reasons. This was after he suffered a stroke on 25 September 1982, while he was speaking in an official function. He were admitted to hospital after his stroke, and later after his discharge were forced to take a prolonged leave of absence from his official duties, with Ramli Ngah Talib acting as Menteri Besar. His resignation were made effective 1 March 1983, with Ramli officially taking over as Menteri Besar. Wan Mohamed also resigned from his role as BN Perak state liaison chief and United Malays National Organization (UMNO) Parit Buntar division chief, though he remained the party's Supreme Council member and Gerik division chief.

The dates for the by-election and nomination were announced by the Election Commission of Malaysia on 4 March 1983.

== Nomination and campaign ==
After nominations closed on 24 March 1983, it was confirmed there will be a straight fight between BN and Pan Malaysian Islamic Party (PAS) candidate. BN nominated Johan Lahamat, a businessman who is former UMNO Gerik division Youth chief and the current party Gerik town chairman, while PAS nominated Mohd Arif Yaacob, the party's Gerik division chief. Democratic Action Party (DAP), whose candidate contested against Wan Mohamed in the 1982 state election, did not file any nomination for the by-election. The reason given by the party is they want to consolidate in recapture the seats lost by DAP in the last election, but were seen by the opponents of the party as abandoning rural areas.

== Timeline ==
The key dates are listed below.

Date	Event
	Issue of the Writ of Election
24 March 1983	Nomination Day
25 March - 8 April 1983	Campaigning Period
	Early polling day for postal and overseas voters
9 April 1983	Polling Day

== Results ==
Perak state by-election, 9 April 1983: Kenering Upon the resignation of incumbent, Wan Mohamed Wan Teh
Party	Candidate	Votes	%	∆%
BN	Johan Lahamat	6,116	70.67	▲0.14
PAS	Mohd Arif Yaacob	2,538	29.33	▲29.33
Total valid votes		8,654	100.00	
Total rejected ballots		174		
Unreturned ballots		?		
Turnout		8,828	64.97	▼10.63
Registered electors		13,587		
Majority		3,578	?	?
BN hold		Swing		?

== Previous results ==
Perak state election, 1982: Kenering
Party	Candidate	Votes	%	∆%
BN	Wan Mohamed Wan Teh	6,760	70.53	▲
DAP	Chow Pek Chee	2,824	29.47	▼
Total valid votes		9,584	100.00	
Total rejected ballots		562		
Unreturned ballots				
Turnout		10,146	75.6	▼
Registered electors		13,421		
Majority		3,936	▲	
BN hold		Swing		
