= 1997 Pulai Chondong by-election =

By-election in Malaysia in 1997

1997 Pulau Chondong by-election
← 1995	6 January 1997	1999 →

N32 Pulai Chondong seat in the Kelantan State Legislative Assembly
- Turnout: 75.40%
	PAS	BN
Candidate	Zulkifli Mamat	Yusoff Hamzah
Party	PAS	UMNO
Alliance		BN
Popular vote	4,778	4,660
Percentage	50.20%	48.96%
MLA before election
Noor Ahmad
BN(UMNO) (Note: Noor Ahmad was a member of the Parti Melayu Semangat 46 and won the seat as S46 member prior to the party dissolution. At the time of his death, he is a member of UMNO.)
Elected MLA
Zulkifli Mamat
PAS

The 1997 Pulai Chondong by-election was a by-election that was held on 6 January 1997 for the Kelantan State Legislative Assembly seat of Pulai Chondong. It was called following the death of its Parti Melayu Semangat 46 assemblyman Noor Ahmad, who recently moved to UMNO about a month before. Ahmad won the seat on 1995 Malaysian general election under Angkatan Perpaduan Ummah banner against Nooruddin Hassan of Barisan Nasional with a majority of 1,461.

Zulkifli Mamat of PAS won the seat against Barisan Nasional Yusoff Hamzah with a slim majority of 118 votes. The constituency have 12,238 registered voters.

== Nomination ==
On nomination day, two candidate were confirmed. Barisan Nasional nominated local candidate which is former Kelantan South Development Authority deputy general manager, Yusoff Hamzah. PAS nominated former senior lecturer with the Kelantan branch of Universiti Teknologi MARA, Zulkifli Mamat.

== Timeline ==
The key dates are listed below.

Date	Event
16 December 1996	Issue of the Writ of Election
24 December 1996	Nomination Day
25 December 1996- 5 January 1997	Campaigning Period
2-5 January 1997	Early polling day for postal and overseas voters
6 January 1997	Polling Day

== Results ==
Kelantan state by-election, 6 January 1997: Pulai Chondong upon the death of incumbent Noor Ahmad
Party	Candidate	Votes	%	∆%
PAS	Zulkifli Mamat	4,778	50.20	▲50.20
BN	Yusoff Hamzah	4,660	48.96	▲9.26
Total valid votes		9,438	100.00	
Total rejected ballots		80		
Unreturned ballots		0		
Turnout		9,518	75.40	▼3.65
Registered electors		12,635		
Majority		118	1.24	▼91.9
PAS gain from S46		Swing		?
