= 1986 Oya by-election =

By-election in Malaysia in 1986

| ← 1983 | 1-2 July 1986 | 1987 → |

Oya seat in the Sarawak State Legislative Assembly
| | BN | IND |
| Candidate | Wan Mahdzar | Salleh Jafaruddin |
| Party | PBB | Independent |
| Alliance | BN |
| Popular vote | 4,215 | 2,460 |
| Percentage | NA% | NA% |
MLA before election
Salleh Jafaruddin
Independent
Elected MLA
Nawi Ahmad
Barisan Nasional (PBB)

The 1986 Oya by-election was a by-election that was held on 1-2 July 1986 for the Sarawak State Legislative Assembly seat of Oya. It was called following the resignation of its assemblyman Salleh Jafaruddin on 14th April 1986. Salleh won the seat on two previous general election on Barisan Nasional ticket.

Wan Mahdzar of Barisan Nasional won the seat against now Independent candidate Salleh Jafaruddin with a majority of 1,755 votes.The seat have 8,537 registered voters.

== Nomination ==
On nomination day, now Independent candidate Salleh Jafaruddin and Wan Mahdzar of Barisan Nasional registered as the candidate. Salleh Jafarudin is a former Parti Pesaka Bumiputera Bersatu vice president and backed by Abdul Rahman Ya'kub, forth Yang di-Pertua Negeri of Sarawak. The by-election were seen as proxy war between Abdul Rahman and Sarawak Barisan Nasional chairman, Abdul Taib Mahmud. Both candidate is cousin.

== Results ==
Sarawak state by-election, 1-2 July 1986: Oya upon the resignation of its assemblyman Salleh Jafaruddin
| Party | Candidate | Votes | % | ∆% |
|---|---|---|---|---|
| BN | Wan Mahdzar | 4,215 | 0 | 0 |
| Independent | Salleh Jafaruddin | 2,460 | 0 | 0 |
| Total valid votes | | 6,675 | 0 | 0 |
| Total rejected ballots | | N/A | 0 | 0 |
| Unreturned ballots | | N/A | 0 | 0 |
| Turnout | | 6,383 (Note: As per reported by New Straits Times. The actual turnout tally will be more than that as total votes for all candidates is 6,675 and the rejected and unreturned ballots tally is unknown.) | 0 | 0 |
| Registered electors | | 8,537 | 0 | 0 |
| Majority | | 1,755 | 0 | 0 |
| BN hold | | Swing | | ? |
