= 1980 Kemabong by-election =

1980 Kemabong in Sabah, Malaysia

← 1976	21-24 May 1980	1981 →

Kemabong seat in the Sabah State Legislative Assembly
	BERJAYA	IND
Candidate	Justin Sanggau	Sandig Ampara
Party	BERJAYA	Independent
Alliance	BN
Popular vote	2,007	511
Percentage	74.97%	19.09%
Kemabong assemblyman before election
Asmawi Chew
BERJAYA
Elected Kemabong assemblyman
Justin Sanggau
BERJAYA

The 1980 Kemabong by-election is a by-election for the Sabah State Legislative Assembly seat of Kemabong that were held from 21 to 24 May 1980. It was called following the resignation of the incumbent, Asmawi Chew on 11 March 1980.

The by election were held on the same dates as 1980 Sugut by-election.

== Background ==
Asmawie Chew Ah Ngok @ Asmawi Chew @ Albert Chew Ah Nyuk, from Sabah People's United Front (BERJAYA), were elected to the state seat of Kemabong in the 1976 Sabah state election, winning the seat from the incumbent United Sabah National Organization (USNO) as BERJAYA won the state election to become the new government party of Sabah.

On 11 March 1980, Chief Minister of Sabah and BERJAYA President, Harris Salleh announced that Asmawi and Sugut assemblyman Betua Abbah have resigned from their state seats. Harris stated the reason given for Asmawi resignation was 'to make way for better representative to serve the constituency'. This necessitates for by-election for both seats to be held, as the seats were vacated more that 2 years before the expiry of the state assembly current term.

Election Commission of Malaysia announced on 4 April 1980 that the by-election for the seat will be held from 21 to 24 May 1980 if there is a contest, with 26 April 1980 set as the nomination day.

== Nomination and campaign ==
After both BERJAYA resignations, USNO said that they would not contest the by-elections, to focus their resources in the upcoming state election.

After nominations at Tenom district office closed on 27 April 1980, it was confirmed there would be a straight fight between BERJAYA and independent for the Kemabong seat. BERJAYA named Justin Anggau, while an independent candidate Sandig Ampara also handed his nomination.

== Timeline ==
The key dates are listed below.

Date	Event
	Issue of the Writ of Election
26 April 1980	Nomination Day
26 April-20 May 1980	Campaigning Period
	Early polling day for postal and overseas voters
21-24 May 1980	Polling Day

== Results ==
Sabah state by-election, 21-24 May 1980: Kemabong Upon the resignation of incumbent, Asmawi Chew
Party	Candidate	Votes	%	∆%
BERJAYA	Justin Sanggau	2,007	74.97	
Independent	Sandig Ampara	511	19.09	
Total valid votes		2,518	94.06	
Total rejected ballots		159	5.94	
Unreturned ballots		?		
Turnout		2,677	66.47	▼16.92
Registered electors		4,027		
Majority		1,496	?	?
BERJAYA hold		Swing		?

== Previous result ==
Sabah state election, 1976: Kemabong
Party	Candidate	Votes	%	∆%
BERJAYA	Asmawi Chew @ Albert Chew Ah Nyuk	1,598		
USNO	Datuk Yaakub Tingkalor bin Lampag	983		
Independent	Pangal bin Engoh	65		
Total valid votes		2,646		
Total rejected ballots		161		
Unreturned ballots		0	0.00	
Turnout		2,807	83.39	
Registered electors		3,366		
Majority		615		
BERJAYA gain from USNO		Swing		?
Source(s) "SABAH_1976_DUN_RESULTS".

== Aftermath ==
After BERJAYA candidates were announced as winners, the party president Harris said in an interview that voters have reached political maturity and would not be swayed by opposition propaganda.

Justin would successfully defend the seat in the next year's state election.
