= Shahbandar Raya (state constituency) =

Selangor constituency

Defunct state constituency
- Legislature: Selangor State Legislative Assembly
- Constituency created: 1984
- Constituency abolished: 1995
- First contested: 1986
- Last contested: 1990

Shahbandar Raya was a state constituency in Selangor, Malaysia, that was represented in the Selangor State Legislative Assembly from 1986 to 1995.

The state constituency was created in the 1984 redistribution and was mandated to return a single member to the Selangor State Legislative Assembly under the first past the post voting system.

== History ==
It was abolished in 1995 when it was redistributed.

=== Representation history ===
Members of the Legislative Assembly for Shahbandar Raya
Assembly	No	Years	Member	Party
Constituency created from Bukit Raja
7th	N33	1986-1990	M. Sellathevan	BN (MIC)
8th	N33	1990-1994	T. M. Thurai	BN (MIC)
8th	N33	1994-1995	Rajakupal Sinnathamby	BN (MIC)
Constituency abolished, renamed to Kota Raja

== Election results ==
Selangor state by-election, 28 May 1994 Upon the death of incumbent, T. M. Thurai
Party	Candidate	Votes	%	∆%
BN	S. S. Rajagopal	13,909	77.88	▲19.18
Independent	Subari Saman	3,080	17.25	▲17.25
Independent	Pu Palan Muthusamy	871	4.88	▲4.88
Total valid votes		17,860	100.00	
Total rejected ballots		247		
Unreturned ballots		15		
Turnout		18,122	48.25	▼28.12
Registered electors		37,559		
Majority		10,829	60.63	▲43.24
BN hold		Swing		

Selangor state election, 1990
Party	Candidate	Votes	%	∆%
BN	T. M. Thurai	13,357	58.69	▼16.97
S46	A. N. Mathurai	9,400	41.31	▲41.31
Total valid votes		22,757	100.00	
Total rejected ballots		977		
Unreturned ballots		0		
Turnout		23,734	76.37	▲4.11
Registered electors		31,076		
Majority		3,957	17.39	▼33.94
BN hold		Swing		

Selangor state election, 1986
Party	Candidate	Votes	%
BN	M. Sellathevan	10,959	79.38
PAS	Md Ismat Habib Mohamad	2,846	20.62
Total valid votes		13,805	100.00
Total rejected ballots		565	
Unreturned ballots		0	
Turnout		14,370	63.44
Registered electors		22,652	
Majority		8,113	51.33
This was a new constituency created.
