= Maximus Ongkili =

Malaysian politician

Yang Berbahagia Datuk Seri Panglima Dr. Maximus Ongkili SPDK SSAP DGSM
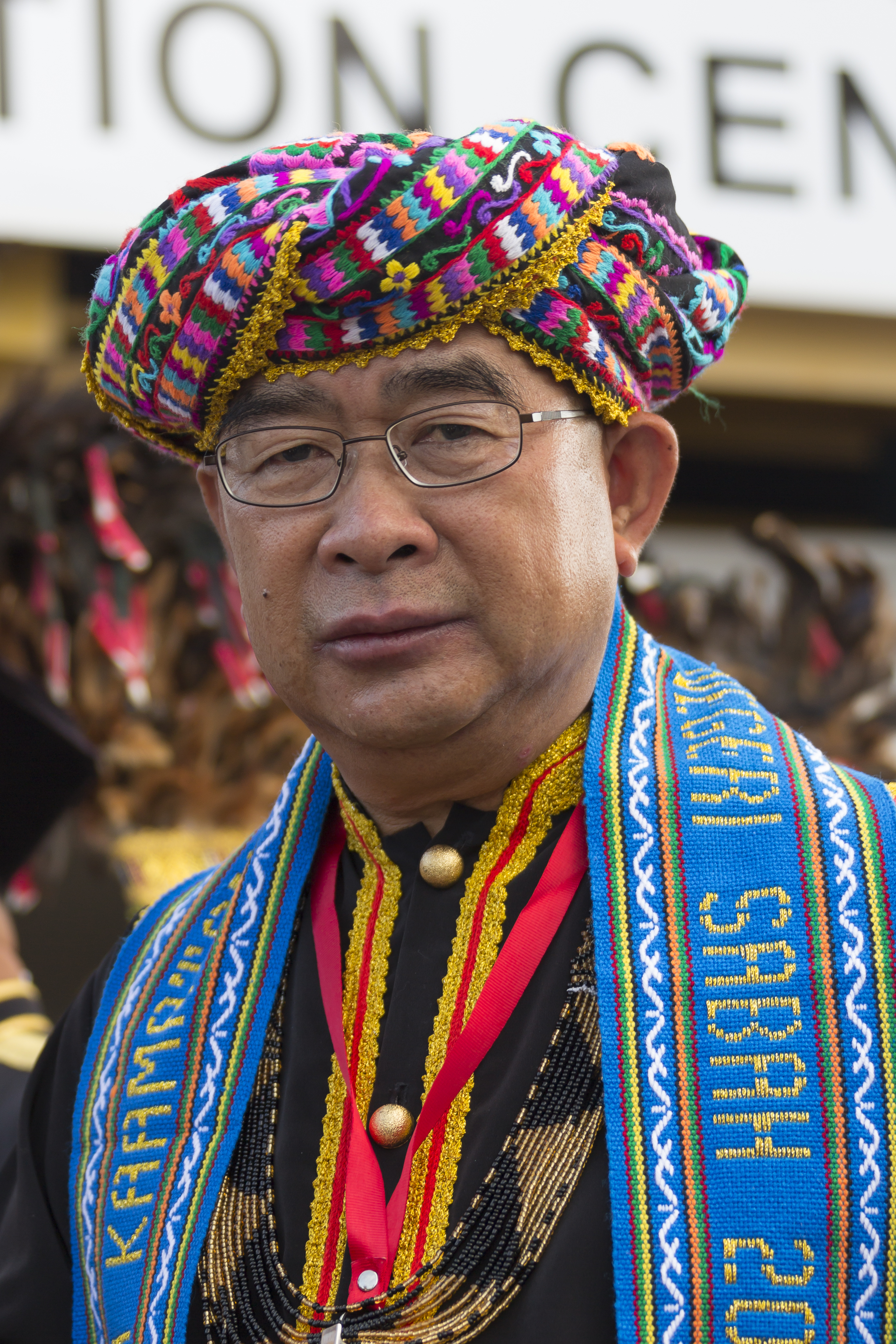

Chairman of the Energy Commission of Sabah
- Incumbent
- Assumed office 1 February 2023
- Governor: Juhar Mahiruddin (2023–2024); Musa Aman (since 2025)
- Chief Minister: Hajiji Noor

Minister in the Prime Minister's Department Sabah and Sarawak Affairs
- In office 30 August 2021 – 24 November 2022
- Monarch: Abdullah
- Prime Minister: Ismail Sabri Yaakob
- Deputy: Hanifah Hajar Taib
- Preceded by: Himself
- Succeeded by: Armizan Mohd Ali
- Constituency: Kota Marudu
- In office 10 March 2020 – 16 August 2021
- Monarch: Abdullah
- Prime Minister: Muhyiddin Yassin
- Deputy: Hanifah Hajar Taib
- Preceded by: Position established
- Succeeded by: Himself
- Constituency: Kota Marudu
- In office 27 March 2004 – 18 March 2008; National Unity and Integration
- Monarchs: Sirajuddin; Mizan Zainal Abidin
- Prime Minister: Abdullah Ahmad Badawi
- Deputy: Joseph Entulu Belaun
- Preceded by: Siti Zaharah Sulaiman (Minister of National Unity and Community Development)
- Succeeded by: Shafie Apdal (Minister of National Unity, Arts, Culture and Heritage)
- Constituency: Kota Marudu

Minister of Energy, Green Technology and Water
- In office 16 May 2013 – 9 May 2018
- Monarchs: Abdul Halim; Muhammad V
- Prime Minister: Najib Razak
- Deputy: Mahdzir Khalid (2013–2015); James Dawos Mamit (2015–2018)
- Preceded by: Peter Chin Fah Kui
- Succeeded by: Yeo Bee Yin (Energy); Xavier Jayakumar Arulanandam (Water)
- Constituency: Kota Marudu

Minister of Science, Technology and Innovation
- In office 19 March 2008 – 15 May 2013
- Monarchs: Mizan Zainal Abidin; Abdul Halim
- Prime Minister: Abdullah Ahmad Badawi; Najib Razak
- Deputy: Fadillah Yusof
- Preceded by: Jamaluddin Jarjis
- Succeeded by: Ewon Ebin
- Constituency: Kota Marudu

Member of the Malaysian Parliament for Kota Marudu
- In office 21 March 2004 – 19 November 2022
- Preceded by: Position established
- Succeeded by: Wetrom Bahanda (KDM)
- Majority: 3,189 (2004); 4,198 (2008); 842 (2013); 1,774 (2018)

Member of the Malaysian Parliament for Bandau
- In office 25 April 1995 – 21 March 2004
- Preceded by: George Sangkin (PBS)
- Succeeded by: Position abolished
- Majority: 4,865 (1995); 1,684 (1999)

Ministerial roles (Sabah)
- 1994: Assistant Minister to the Chief Minister

Faction represented in Dewan Rakyat
- 1995–2002: United Sabah Party
- 2002–2018: Barisan Nasional
- 2018–2022: United Sabah Party
- 2022: Gabungan Rakyat Sabah

Faction represented in Sabah State Legislative Assembly
- 1994–2002: United Sabah Party
- 2002–2008: Barisan Nasional

Personal details
- Born: Maximus Johnity Ongkili; 26 October 1953 (age 72) Jesselton, Crown Colony of North Borneo
- Party: United Sabah Party
- Other political affiliations: United Alliance (GBS); Perikatan Nasional (PN); Barisan Nasional (BN); Gagasan Rakyat (GR); Parti Gabungan Rakyat Sabah (GRS Party)
- Spouse(s): Joan Maluda (died 2018) Chhunlin Roeng (m. 2023)
- Relations: James Peter Ongkili (brother); Joseph Pairin Kitingan (uncle); Jeffrey Kitingan (uncle)
- Children: Rachel Jane Ongkili; Andreas Jordan Ongkili
- Education: La Trobe University
- Occupation: Politician
- Website: www.mpkotamarudu.my

Maximus Johnity Ongkili (born 26 October 1953) is a Malaysian politician who has served as Chairman of the Energy Commission of Sabah (ECOS) since February 2023. He served as Minister in the Prime Minister's Department for Sabah and Sarawak Affairs for the second term in the Barisan Nasional (BN) administration under former Prime Minister Ismail Sabri Yaakob from August 2021 to the collapse of the BN administration in November 2022, the first term in the Perikatan Nasional (PN) administration under former Prime Minister Muhyiddin Yassin from March 2020 to August 2021 as well as for National Unity and Integration in the Barisan Nasional (BN) administration under former Prime Minister Abdullah Ahmad Badawi from March 2004 to March 2008 and the Minister of Energy, Green Technology and Water in the BN administration under former Prime Minister Najib Razak from May 2013 to May 2018, Member of Parliament (MP) for Kota Marudu from March 2004 to November 2022 and for Bandau from April 1995 to March 2004. He is the 2nd President and a member of the United Sabah Party (PBS), a component party of the Gabungan Rakyat Sabah (GRS).

== Personal life ==
Ongkili was born on 26 October 1953 in Kota Kinabalu to parents from the district of Tambunan, namely a retired police officer, Alexius @ Alexander Ongkili Indoh, Snr. (1910–1991) from Kampung Lintuhun who was then reassigned to the Sabah police contingent headquarters of the Royal Malaysia Police (then known as the North Borneo Armed Constabulary), but later acquired land and settled in Keningau (in the village of Kampung Ria/Lingkudau) after his retirement from the police force and a housewife, Battindoi Kondilab Komboon (1915–1986), a native of Kampung Karanaan with patriline ancestral roots in Kampung Nouduh.

He is married with two children (currently widowed since 2018 and has since remarried as of 2023) and holds a Doctor of Philosophy in Agricultural Economics, conferred by Australia's La Trobe University. He is a Christian belonging to the Borneo Evangelical Church (but formerly a Roman Catholic from birth until his adulthood, when he was deemed to be born again by converting to Protestantism via the said denomination). Ongkili is also the nephew of former Chief Minister, Joseph Pairin Kitingan and also of veteran politician, Jeffrey Kitingan, who is also the President of the Homeland Solidarity Party (STAR).

== Political career ==
=== In the Opposition ===
Ongkili was originally an opposition politician but joined the government when the PBS joined the Barisan Nasional (BN) coalition in 2002.

In 1991, he was imprisoned under the Internal Security Act for 59 days. This was part of political arrests carried out between 1990 and 1991 to crack down on opposition leaders in Sabah, Malaysia, and their alleged plans to secede the state from Malaysia, allegedly known as Operation Talkak. Seven men were detained under the Internal Security Act (ISA). (See also 1991 Sabah political arrests).

At the time of his arrest on 3 January 1991, Ongkili was a senior researcher and deputy chief director of IDS and electoral press consultant to then Chief Minister of Sabah Joseph Pairin Kitingan during the 1990 Sabah state and national elections. He was released unconditionally on 2 March.

=== In the Government ===
Ongkili entered Parliament in the 1995 general election (at the time, the Kota Marudu seat was named Bandau). He was appointed a Minister in the Prime Minister's Department after the 2004 election by Prime Minister Mahathir Mohamad's successor Abdullah Ahmad Badawi. Ongkili was placed in charge of National Unity, and headed the initiation of the Khidmat Negara conscription program.

Ongkili was also a member of the Sabah State Legislative Assembly until the 2008 election, when he stood aside from his Tandek seat.

In 2008, Ongkili became the Minister of Science, Technology, and Innovation. Then, after his victory in the 2013 general elections, Ongkili has been appointed Energy, Green Technology and Water Minister.

== Election results ==
Parliament of Malaysia
Year	Constituency	Candidate	Votes	Pct	Opponent(s)	Votes	Pct	Ballots cast	Majority	Turnout
1995	P147 Bandau	Maximus Ongkili (PBS)	10,716	64.06%	Jeffrey Kitingan (AKAR)	5,851	34.98%	16,729	4,865	69.72%
1995	P147 Bandau	Maximus Ongkili (PBS)	10,716	64.06%	Conrad Jomilon Mojuntin (IND)	162	0.97%	16,729	4,865	69.72%
1999	P147 Bandau	Maximus Ongkili (PBS)	8,465	51.38%	Maijol Mahap (UPKO)	6,781	41.16%	16,474	1,684	65.66%
1999	P147 Bandau	Maximus Ongkili (PBS)	8,465	51.38%	Baintin Adun (IND)	1,228	7.45%	16,474	1,684	65.66%
2004	P168 Kota Marudu	Maximus Ongkili (PBS)	10,457	59.00%	Anthony Biri Mandiau (IND)	7,268	41.00%	17,725	3,189	66.26%
2008	P168 Kota Marudu	Maximus Ongkili (PBS)	12,028	56.14%	Anthony Biri Mandiau (PKR)	7,830	36.55%	21,424	4,198	69.51%
2008	P168 Kota Marudu	Maximus Ongkili (PBS)	12,028	56.14%	Roslan Mohd Zain (IND)	1,109	5.18%	21,424	4,198	69.51%
2008	P168 Kota Marudu	Maximus Ongkili (PBS)	12,028	56.14%	Berman Angkap (BERSEKUTU)	457	2.13%	21,424	4,198	69.51%
2013	P168 Kota Marudu	Maximus Ongkili (PBS)	15,168	47.16%	Maijol Mahap (PKR)	14,326	44.53%	32,166	842	78.50%
2013	P168 Kota Marudu	Maximus Ongkili (PBS)	15,168	47.16%	Majamis Timbong (STAR)	2,228	6.93%	32,166	842	78.50%
2013	P168 Kota Marudu	Maximus Ongkili (PBS)	15,168	47.16%	Yuntau K. Kolod (SAPP)	444	1.38%	32,166	842	78.50%
2018	P168 Kota Marudu	Maximus Ongkili (PBS)	13,033	38.44%	Maijol Mahap (PHRS)	11,259	33.21%	33,906	1,774	74.95%
2018	P168 Kota Marudu	Maximus Ongkili (PBS)	13,033	38.44%	Barlus Mangabis (WARISAN)	7,113	20.98%	33,906	1,774	74.95%
2018	P168 Kota Marudu	Maximus Ongkili (PBS)	13,033	38.44%	Paul Porodong (PCS)	2,501	7.37%	33,906	1,774	74.95%
2022	P168 Kota Marudu	Maximus Ongkili (PBS)	16,144	32.32%	Wetrom Bahanda (KDM)	24,318	48.69%	49,946	8,174	61.86%
2022	P168 Kota Marudu	Maximus Ongkili (PBS)	16,144	32.32%	Jilid Kuminding (WARISAN)	5,320	10.65%	49,946	8,174	61.86%
2022	P168 Kota Marudu	Maximus Ongkili (PBS)	16,144	32.32%	Shahrizal Denci (MUDA)	3,225	6.46%	49,946	8,174	61.86%
2022	P168 Kota Marudu	Maximus Ongkili (PBS)	16,144	32.32%	Norman Tulang (IND)	660	1.32%	49,946	8,174	61.86%
2022	P168 Kota Marudu	Maximus Ongkili (PBS)	16,144	32.32%	Mohd Azmi Zulkiflee (PEJUANG)	279	0.56%	49,946	8,174	61.86%

Sabah State Legislative Assembly
Year	Constituency	Candidate	Votes	Pct	Opponent(s)	Votes	Pct	Ballots cast	Majority	Turnout
1994	N06 Langkon	Maximus Ongkili (PBS)	4,171	73.47%	Newman Gaban (PBRS)	1,452	25.58%	5,266	2,719	74.60%
1994	N06 Langkon	Maximus Ongkili (PBS)	4,171	73.47%	Linggu Lincoln Luwing (IND)	54	0.95%	5,266	2,719	74.60%
1999	N05 Tandek	Maximus Ongkili (PBS)	5,671	53.77%	Saibul Supu (UPKO)	4,412	41.84%	10,546	1,259	77.09%
1999	N05 Tandek	Maximus Ongkili (PBS)	5,671	53.77%	Joe Santi (BERSEKUTU)	463	4.39%	10,546	1,259	77.09%
2004	N05 Tandek	Maximus Ongkili (PBS)	5,069	53.96%	George Sangkin (IND)	2,356	25.08%	9,394	2,713	67.78%
2004	N05 Tandek	Maximus Ongkili (PBS)	5,069	53.96%	Anthony Biri Mandiau (IND)	692	7.37%	9,394	2,713	67.78%
2004	N05 Tandek	Maximus Ongkili (PBS)	5,069	53.96%	Shahnuar Bodok (IND)	685	7.29%	9,394	2,713	67.78%
2004	N05 Tandek	Maximus Ongkili (PBS)	5,069	53.96%	Abdul Kahar Abdul Rahman (keADILan)	592	6.30%	9,394	2,713	67.78%

== Honours ==
- Malacca
  - Grand Commander of the Exalted Order of Malacca (DGSM) – Datuk Seri (2009)
- Pahang
  - Knight Grand Companion of the Order of Sultan Ahmad Shah of Pahang (SSAP) – Dato' Sri (2017)
- Sabah
  - Grand Commander of the Order of Kinabalu (SPDK) – Datuk Seri Panglima (2011)
  - Commander of the Order of Kinabalu (PGDK) – Datuk (2001)
