= 1991 Sabah political arrests =

Political arrests was carried out between 1990 and 1991 to crack down on opposition leaders in Sabah, Malaysia, and their alleged plans to secede the state from Malaysia, allegedly known as Operation Talkak. Seven men were detained under the Internal Security Act (ISA). All seven men were leaders or prominent members the Kadazan Cultural Association (KCA), Institute for Development Studies (IDS), Sabah Foundation, and opposition party Parti Bersatu Sabah (PBS), and were placed under two-year detention orders.

== Events leading up to Operation Talkak ==
=== February 1990 ===
Jeffrey Kitingan, 42, director of IDS, younger brother of Chief Minister of Sabah Pairin Kitingan, is charged in a high court with seven counts of corruption. The corruption charges are in regards to the export of timber.

=== July 1990 ===
PBS calls for a 50-50 redistribution of revenue from Sabah's resources, particularly from crude oil. At the time, the distribution is 95–5, with 95% going to the federal government and 5% to Sabah. Sabah produces a fifth of Malaysia's total crude oil output. State election was held on 16 to 17 July. Before the election, PBS left the Barisan Nasional coalition and won with a two-thirds majority in the state assembly.

=== October 1990 ===
Four days before the Malaysian general election, PBS withdraws from Barisan Nasional (BN), and joins opposition party Semangat 46. According to Bernard Dompok, the relationship between PBS and BN had always been an uneasy one, since PBS came to power during the Sabah state elections in 1985.

== Chronology of Events ==
=== May 1990 ===
Damit Undikai, 54, PBS member and former Special Branch officer, is arrested by Special Branch police forces on 18 May, for allegedly heading plans to secede Sabah from the Malaysian federation.

Albinus Yudah, 41, chief of security at Borneo Rest House, member of PBS and KCA, and former police constable, is arrested on 25 May.

Benedict Topin, 37, PBS member, Executive Secretary of KCA, is arrested on 25 May. The Malaysian police claims to have been monitoring him since 1987.

=== July 1990 ===
Abdul Rahman Ahmad, 51, Assistant Superintendent of Police, Sabah, is arrested on 7 July.

=== January 1991 ===
Maximus Ongkili, 37, senior researcher and deputy chief director of IDS, nephew of Jeffrey Kitingan and Chief Minister of Sabah Joseph Pairin Kitingan, electoral press consultant to Pairin Kitingan during the 1990 Sabah state and national elections, is arrested on 3 January.

Vincent Chung, manager of administration and personnel, Sabah Foundation, is arrested on 19 January.

Joseph Pairin Kitingan, 50, Chief Minister of Sabah, Huguan Siou (Paramount Leader) of the Kadazandusun Cultural Association (KDCA), president of Parti Bersatu Sabah (PBS), is pressed with corruption charges. Almost a year earlier, his brother Jeffrey Kitingan was pressed with similar charges.

=== March 1991 ===
Maximus Ongkili is released unconditionally on 2 March.

=== May 1991 ===
Jeffrey Kitingan is arrested on 13 May.

== Present day ==
Present-day political conditions in Sabah and Malaysia have taken a surprising turn, in comparison with the conditions during Operation Talkak. Several of the previously detained figures have gone on to assume prominent positions in the current Malaysian government. These political conditions, and political choices of the previously detained figures, have been met with mixed receptions by the public.

- Parti Bersatu Sabah, under the leadership of Pairin Kitingan, has been a member of the Barisan Nasional coalition since 2002, but has since left in 2018 due to the electoral defeat of the BN coalition.
- Maximus Ongkili was appointed a Minister in the Prime Minister's Department in 2004, by Mahathir Mohamad's successor Abdullah Ahmad Badawi. Ongkili was placed in charge of National Unity, and headed the initiation of the Khidmat Negara conscription program.
- Berita Sabah (Sabah News), a weekly compact newspaper partly owned by Jeffrey Kitingan, has its publication license suspended by the Ministry of Home Affairs in August 1997. The newspaper published news from the opposition and various pro-PBS news. The licence was revoked on the grounds of "spreading fitnah (lies)".

== See also ==
- 1986 Sabah riots
- Sabah state election, 1985
- Malaysian general election, 1990
