= Ellron Alfred Angin =

Malaysian politician (born 1958)

Yang Bebahagia Datuk Ellron Alfred Angin PGDK

Ministerial Roles (Sabah)
- 2008–2013: Assistant Minister of Tourism, Culture and Environment
- 2013–2018: Assistant Minister to the Chief Minister
- 2018: Minister of Rural Development
- 2020–2025: Minister of Youth and Sports

Deputy President of the Homeland Solidarity Party (Non-Muslim Bumiputera)
- In office 2018–2025 Serving with Jalumin Bayogoh (Muslim Bumiputera) (2016–2021); Kong Fui Seng (Chinese) (2016–2021); Robert Tawik (Muslim Bumiputera) (2021–2025); Fung Len Fui (Chinese) (2021–2024); Kenny Chua Teck Ho (Chinese) (2024–2025)
- President: Jeffrey Kitingan

Member of the Sabah State Legislative Assembly for Sook
- In office 8 March 2008 – 29 November 2025
- Preceded by: Joseph Kurup (BN–PBRS)
- Succeeded by: Arthur Joseph Kurup (BN–PBRS)
- Majority: 2,131 (2008); 4,395 (2013); 4,485 (2018); 1,232 (2020)

Faction represented in the Sabah State Legislative Assembly
- 2008–2018: Barisan Nasional
- 2018: Independent
- 2018–2020: Homeland Solidarity Party
- 2020–2022: Perikatan Nasional
- 2020–2025: Gabungan Rakyat Sabah

Personal details
- Born: Ellron bin Angin; 15 July 1958 (age 68) Sook, Keningau, Crown Colony of North Borneo (now Sabah, Malaysia)
- Party: Parti Bersatu Rakyat Sabah (PBRS) (until 2018); Homeland Solidarity Party (STAR) (2018–2025)
- Other political affiliations: Barisan Nasional (BN) (until 2018); Perikatan Nasional (PN) (2020–2022); Gabungan Rakyat Sabah (GRS) (since 2020)
- Spouse: Maria Concepcion Omamalin (died 2023)
- Children: Jordan Jude Ellron
- Occupation: Politician

Ellron bin Angin (born 15 July 1958) is a Malaysian politician who served as the State Minister of Rural Development briefly in 2018 and the State Minister of Youth and Sports from 2020 until 2025 in the Gabungan Rakyat Sabah (GRS) state administration under Chief Minister Hajiji Noor. He served as the Member of Sabah State Legislative Assembly (MLA) for Sook from March 2008 to November 2025. He is formerly a member of the Parti Bersatu Rakyat Sabah (PBRS), a component party of the Barisan Nasional (BN) coalition and formerly a member of the Homeland Solidarity Party (STAR) from 2018 until October 2025, a component party of the (GRS) and formerly Perikatan Nasional (PN) coalitions.

== Election results ==
Parliament of Malaysia
Year	Constituency	Candidate	Votes	Pct	Opponent(s)	Votes	Pct	Ballots cast	Majority	Turnout
1995	P157 Keningau	Ellron Alfred Angin (PBRS)	8,736	33.29%	Joseph Pairin Kitingan (PBS)	17,510	66.71%	26,642	8,774	73.11%

Sabah State Legislative Assembly
Year	Constituency	Candidate	Votes	Pct	Opponent(s)	Votes	Pct	Ballots cast	Majority	Turnout
2008	N37 Sook	Ellron Alfred Angin (PBRS)	5,158	62.86%	Peter Lunuk (PKR)	2,721	33.17%	9,250	2,131	73.62%
2008	N37 Sook	Ellron Alfred Angin (PBRS)	5,158	62.86%	Suaidin Langkab (IND)	202	2.46%	9,250	2,131	73.62%
2008	N37 Sook	Ellron Alfred Angin (PBRS)	5,158	62.86%	Sidum Manjin (BERSEKUTU)	124	1.51%	9,250	2,131	73.62%
2013	N37 Sook	Ellron Alfred Angin (PBRS)	7,223	54.58%	Kustin Ladi (STAR)	2,828	21.37%	13,535	4,395	82.80%
2013	N37 Sook	Ellron Alfred Angin (PBRS)	7,223	54.58%	Liberty Lopog (PKR)	1,911	14.44%	13,535	4,395	82.80%
2013	N37 Sook	Ellron Alfred Angin (PBRS)	7,223	54.58%	Frankie Chong Yu Chee (SAPP)	1,226	9.26%	13,535	4,395	82.80%
2013	N37 Sook	Ellron Alfred Angin (PBRS)	7,223	54.58%	Rusayidi Abdullah (IND)	46	0.35%	13,535	4,395	82.80%
2018	N37 Sook	Ellron Alfred Angin (PBRS)	8,042	53.21%	Martin Tomy (WARISAN)	3,557	23.53%	15,503	4,485	81.10%
2018	N37 Sook	Ellron Alfred Angin (PBRS)	8,042	53.21%	Baritus Gungkit (STAR)	3,402	22.51%	15,503	4,485	81.10%
2018	N37 Sook	Ellron Alfred Angin (PBRS)	8,042	53.21%	Beaty Fred (PKAN)	113	0.75%	15,503	4,485	81.10%
2020	N45 Sook	Ellron Alfred Angin (STAR)	3,554	46.71%	Raymond Ahuar (PKR)	2,322	30.51%	7,164	1,232	73.18%
2020	N45 Sook	Ellron Alfred Angin (STAR)	3,554	46.71%	Bonepes Been (PBRS)	1,535	20.17%	7,164	1,232	73.18%
2020	N45 Sook	Ellron Alfred Angin (STAR)	3,554	46.71%	Aning Ansawang (LDP)	110	1.45%	7,164	1,232	73.18%
2020	N45 Sook	Ellron Alfred Angin (STAR)	3,554	46.71%	Rebecca Taimin (PCS)	88	1.16%	7,164	1,232	73.18%
2025	N45 Sook	Ellron Alfred Angin (GRS)	3,580	24.95%	Arthur Joseph Kurup (PBRS)	8,307	57.90%	14,347	4,727	70.50%
2025	N45 Sook	Ellron Alfred Angin (GRS)	3,580	24.95%	Ireneus Pagut @ Jreneus Pagut (STAR)	1,681	11.70%	14,347	4,727	70.50%
2025	N45 Sook	Ellron Alfred Angin (GRS)	3,580	24.95%	Joseph Peter Tinggi (WARISAN)	708	4.93%	14,347	4,727	70.50%
2025	N45 Sook	Ellron Alfred Angin (GRS)	3,580	24.95%	V Chong Vin @ Siau Ho (IMPIAN)	71	0.49%	14,347	4,727	70.50%

== Honours ==
- Sabah
  - Commander of the Order of Kinabalu (PGDK) – Datuk (2006)
  - Companion of the Order of Kinabalu (ASDK) (2003)
