= Joseph Pairin Kitingan =

Malaysian politician

Yang Berbahagia Huguan Siou Tan Sri Datuk Seri Panglima Joseph Pairin Kitingan PMN SPDK SSAP JP
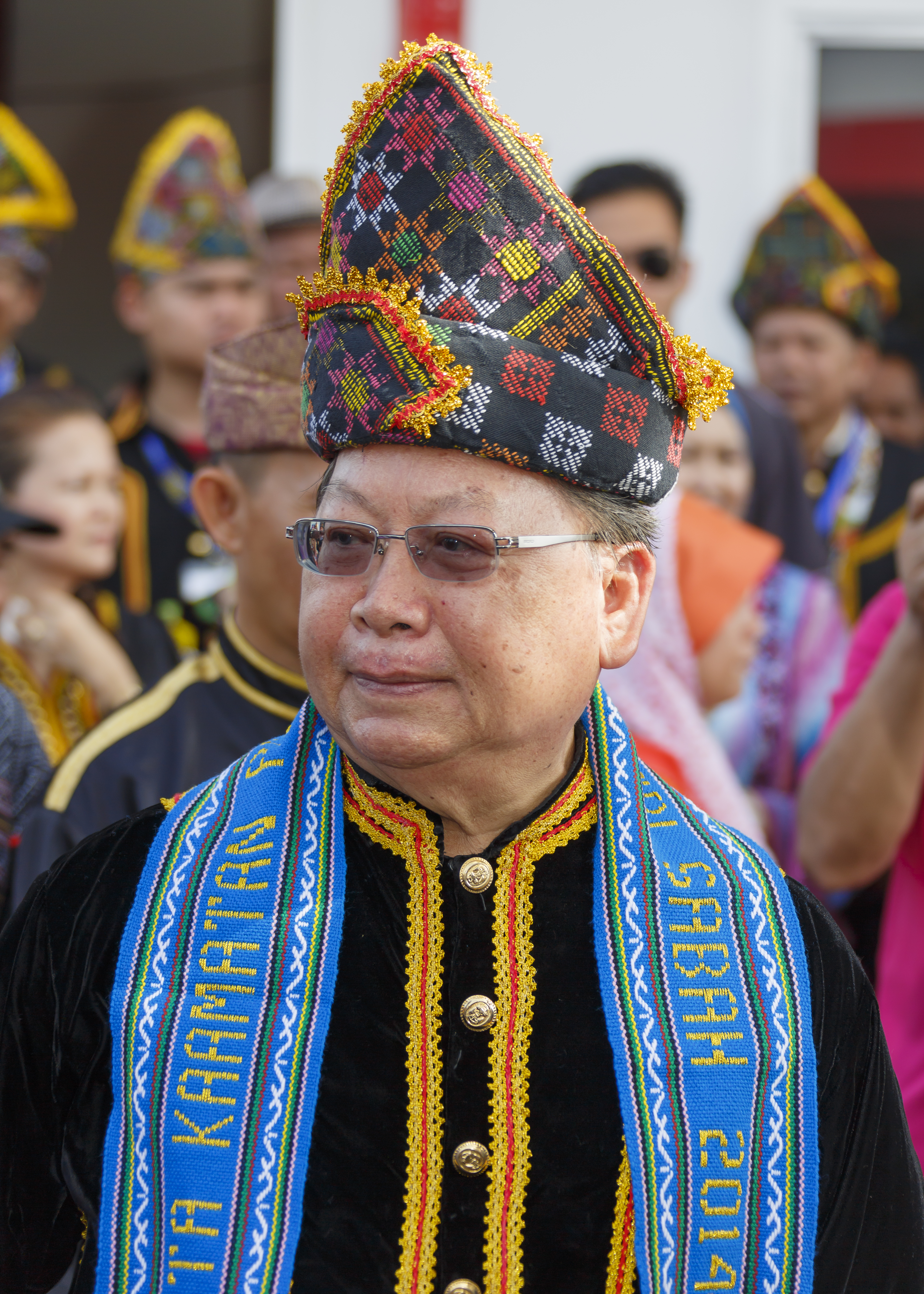

7th Chief Minister of Sabah
- In office 22 April 1985 – 17 March 1994
- Governor: Mohamad Adnan Robert; Mohammad Said Keruak
- Deputy: Joseph Kurup (1986-1990); Ahmad Bahrom Titingan; Bernard Giluk Dompok (1990-1994); Yong Teck Lee (1990-1994); Chau Tet On (1986-1990)
- Preceded by: Harris Salleh
- Succeeded by: Sakaran Dandai

Member of the Malaysian Parliament for Keningau
- In office 3 August 1986 – 9 May 2018
- Preceded by: Ahmad Shah Hussein Tambakau
- Succeeded by: Jeffrey Kitingan

Huguan Siou of the Kadazandusun Cultural Association (KDCA)
- Incumbent
- Assumed office 1985

Personal details
- Born: Joseph Pairin Kitingan; 17 August 1940 (age 86) Papar, North Borneo (now Sabah, Malaysia)
- Citizenship: Malaysian
- Party: Sabah People's United Front (BERJAYA) (1976–1984); United Sabah Party (PBS) (since 1985)
- Other political affiliations: Gagasan Rakyat (GR) (1990–1996); Barisan Nasional (BN) (1986–1990, 2002–2018); Gabungan Rakyat Sabah (GRS) (since 2020)
- Spouse: Genevieve Lee
- Relations: Jeffrey Kitingan (brother); Maximus Ongkili (nephew); James Peter Ongkili (nephew)
- Children: Alexander; Daniel
- Education: University of Adelaide

Joseph Pairin Kitingan (born 17 August 1940) is a Malaysian politician who served as the 7th Chief Minister of Sabah from April 1985 to March 1994 and Member of Parliament (MP) for Keningau from August 1986 to May 2018. He is founding President of the United Sabah Party (PBS) and brother of Jeffrey Kitingan, the Deputy Chief Minister I and State Minister of Agriculture and Fisheries of Sabah and President of Homeland Solidarity Party (STAR) as well as uncle of Maximus Ongkili, the former Minister in the Prime Minister's Department in charge of Sabah and Sarawak affairs and former president of PBS. He is the longest-serving MP in Sabah.

== Personal life ==
Pairin was born in Papar but his hometown is in the interior district of Tambunan, to a retired police officer, Datuk Francis Xavier Kitingan Sobunau (1895–1996) and his second wife, Datin Lucia Laimah Imbayan (1913–2011), natives of the said district who hailed from two villages, namely Karanaan, which was located just behind Tambunan town centre as well as Nambayan, located on the road leading to the main Interior Division town of Keningau. He attended La Salle Secondary School, an all-boys Catholic missionary school, located in Tanjung Aru, Kota Kinabalu (but prior to that, he attended a few other Catholic missionary schools namely St. David's Primary School, Toboh from primary 1 to 3, St. Theresa's Primary School, Tondulu, from primary 4 to 6 and St. Martin's Secondary School, Tampasak, from forms 1 until 3, all located in his hometown of Tambunan as well as St. Joseph's Secondary School, Papar during forms 4 to lower 6, owing to his father's job postings in the Royal Malaysia Police). He later won a Colombo Plan scholarship and went on to read law at the University of Adelaide and upon completing his studies, he came back to Sabah to work as a State Counsel with the Sabah Legal Department and was later made a Deputy Public Prosecutor. Subsequently, he practised law with a local legal firm. Pairin is a Catholic, married to Genevieve Lee, a retired teacher of mixed Hakka Chinese (Sino-Native) descent. They have two sons, Alexander and Daniel, who are both trained lawyers. His brother Jeffrey Gapari Kitingan is also a politician, a former vice-president of Parti Keadilan Rakyat (PKR) after being a former member of prior political parties such as Parti Bersatu Sabah (PBS), Parti Bersatu Rakyat Sabah (PBRS), Parti Angkatan Keadilan Rakyat (AKAR), United Pasokmomogun Kadazandusun Murut Organisation (UPKO), Parti Keadilan Rakyat (PKR) and also the State Reform Party (STAR) and finally became the leader of his own party, Homeland Solidarity Party (STAR Sabah).

== Political career ==
Pairin began his active political career in 1975. He was elected a Member of the Sabah Legislative Assembly for the Tambunan electorate in 1976 under the Sabah People's United Front (BERJAYA) party ticket, a party which was led by Harris Salleh (Chief Minister 1976–1985) and was appointed as a Minister in the cabinet of the ruling party. Tambunan has become his stronghold ever since.

Over time, Pairin became disillusioned with the party's leadership, and opposed some of the party's policies. He felt that the party had deviated from its original struggle. He however, remained firm with the party and subsequently, he was forced to leave the ruling party coalition in 1984.

== Leadership ==
In December 1984, he challenged as an independent candidate against the ruling party to defend his seat in the Tambunan by-election. His leadership in a state within a federation which had the official religion of Islam, was also questioned because of his religion. Pairin easily won and defended his seat with significant majority.

In March 1985, Pairin formed Parti Bersatu Sabah (PBS). Despite overwhelming odds, he succeeded in registering PBS as a political party in the eleventh hour; thus paving the way for the party to contest against the incumbent state government in the 1985 Sabah state election in April.

PBS won a majority of 25 out of the 48 seats contested in the 1985 state elections. However, BERJAYA and the United Sabah National Organisation (USNO) joined forces submit their candidate as the chief minister, but after riots by BN followers, the newly formed coalition between BERJAYA and USNO was dissolved giving PBS the majority government. Pairin was sworn in as the seventh Chief Minister of the state of Sabah. He held the post of Sabah Chief Minister from April 1985 to March 1994, during which he spearheaded his party's triumphant outings in four successive state elections (1985, 1986, 1990 and 1994).

In the 1994 state election, PBS won the election, however shortly after being announced the winner, almost all PBS assemblymen defected to Barisan Nasional. Pairin was not allowed to be sworn in as Chief Minister. Tun Sakaran Dandai of UMNO was then sworn to be the eighth Chief Minister of Sabah.

On 6 June 2015, Pairin asserted a "clear connection of the incident to the 2015 Sabah earthquake that has brought about so much damage and loss of lives" by a group of European nude tourists on Mount Kinabalu.

Pairin is also the Huguan Siou or Paramount Leader of the Kadazan-Dusun community by virtue of being the president of the Kadazandusun Cultural Association (KDCA), the community's principal cultural association. However, there is a growing concern that Pairin is no longer suitable to hold the Huguan Siou title and that he should give way to the younger generation.

== Election results ==
Parliament of Malaysia
Year	Constituency	Candidate	Votes	Pct	Opponent(s)	Votes	Pct	Ballots cast	Majority	Turnout
1986	P180 Keningau	Joseph Pairin Kitingan (PBS)	Unopposed							
1990	P180 Keningau	Joseph Pairin Kitingan (PBS)	Unopposed							
1995	P180 Keningau	Joseph Pairin Kitingan (PBS)	17,510	66.71%	Ellron Alfred Angin (PBRS)	8,736	33.29%	26,539	8,774	73.11%
1999	P180 Keningau	Joseph Pairin Kitingan (PBS)	12,783	50.49%	Joseph Kurup (PBRS)	12,533	49.51%	25,598	250	64.05%
2004	P180 Keningau	Joseph Pairin Kitingan (PBS)	Unopposed							
2008	P180 Keningau	Joseph Pairin Kitingan (PBS)	14,598	57.27%	Jeffrey Kitingan (PKR)	10,334	40.53%	25,956	4,264	72.96%
2008	P180 Keningau	Joseph Pairin Kitingan (PBS)	14,598	57.27%	Peter Kodou (DAP)	560	2.20%	25,956	4,264	72.96%
2013	P180 Keningau	Joseph Pairin Kitingan (PBS)	15,818	44.50%	Jeffrey Kitingan (STAR)	11,900	33.48%	36,098	3,918	82.73%
2013	P180 Keningau	Joseph Pairin Kitingan (PBS)	15,818	44.50%	Stephen Sandor (PKR)	7,825	22.02%	36,098	3,918	82.73%

Sabah State Legislative Assembly
Year	Constituency	Candidate	Votes	Pct	Opponent(s)	Votes	Pct	Ballots cast	Majority	Turnout
1986	N24 Tambunan	Joseph Pairin Kitingan (PBS)	4,752	86.88%	Bernard Wong Chung Ngin (USNO)	499	9.12%	5,515	4,253	81.41%
1986	N24 Tambunan	Joseph Pairin Kitingan (PBS)	4,752	86.88%	Albertus Ongkudon (BERJAYA)	219	4.00%	5,515	4,253	81.41%
1990	N24 Tambunan	Joseph Pairin Kitingan (PBS)	5,516	90.97%	Aling Amon (USNO)	239	3.94%	6,128	5,277	84.68%
1990	N24 Tambunan	Joseph Pairin Kitingan (PBS)	5,516	90.97%	Juanis Yajuni ALS Joannes Aju (AKAR)	145	2.39%	6,128	5,277	84.68%
1990	N24 Tambunan	Joseph Pairin Kitingan (PBS)	5,516	90.97%	Joseph Jouti Ajun (PRS)	96	1.58%	6,128	5,277	84.68%
1990	N24 Tambunan	Joseph Pairin Kitingan (PBS)	5,516	90.97%	Norbert Angkangon (BERJAYA)	62	1.02%	6,128	5,277	84.68%
1990	N24 Tambunan	Joseph Pairin Kitingan (PBS)	5,516	90.97%	Edmund Otigil (IND)	6	0.10%	6,128	5,277	84.68%
1994	N24 Tambunan	Joseph Pairin Kitingan (PBS)	6,265	89.46%	Martin Yong (PBRS)	569	8.13%	7,047	5,696	86.43%
1994	N24 Tambunan	Joseph Pairin Kitingan (PBS)	6,265	89.46%	Jouti Ajun (IND)	169	2.41%	7,047	5,696	86.43%
1999	N27 Tambunan	Joseph Pairin Kitingan (PBS)	6,791	73.68%	Petrus Gurinting (PBRS)	2,116	22.96%	9,322	4,675	92.43%
1999	N27 Tambunan	Joseph Pairin Kitingan (PBS)	6,791	73.68%	Joseph Ajun (BERSEKUTU)	169	1.83%	9,322	4,675	92.43%
1999	N27 Tambunan	Joseph Pairin Kitingan (PBS)	6,791	73.68%	Juili Matimbun (SETIA)	141	1.53%	9,322	4,675	92.43%
2004	N32 Tambunan	Joseph Pairin Kitingan (PBS)	5,297	72.42%	Nestor Joannes (IND)	2,017	27.58%	7,395	3,280	70.48%
2008	N32 Tambunan	Joseph Pairin Kitingan (PBS)	5,601	65.29%	Moses Micheal Iking (PKR)	2,820	32.88%	8,694	2,781	77.31%
2008	N32 Tambunan	Joseph Pairin Kitingan (PBS)	5,601	65.29%	Francis Koh Kui Tze (IND)	157	1.83%	8,694	2,781	77.31%
2013	N32 Tambunan	Joseph Pairin Kitingan (PBS)	5,586	48.61%	Nestor Joannes (STAR)	3,507	30.52%	11,683	2,079	85.10%
2013	N32 Tambunan	Joseph Pairin Kitingan (PBS)	5,586	48.61%	Wilfred Win Ponil (PKR)	1,744	15.18%	11,683	2,079	85.10%
2013	N32 Tambunan	Joseph Pairin Kitingan (PBS)	5,586	48.61%	Justin Yonsoding (IND)	591	5.14%	11,683	2,079	85.10%
2013	N32 Tambunan	Joseph Pairin Kitingan (PBS)	5,586	48.61%	Francis Koh Kui Tze (IND)	63	0.55%	11,683	2,079	85.10%
2018	N32 Tambunan	Joseph Pairin Kitingan (PBS)	5,099	38.86%	Jeffrey Kitingan (STAR)	6,136	46.78%	13,322	1,037	82.00%
2018	N32 Tambunan	Joseph Pairin Kitingan (PBS)	5,099	38.86%	Justin Alip (WARISAN)	1,427	10.88%	13,322	1,037	82.00%
2018	N32 Tambunan	Joseph Pairin Kitingan (PBS)	5,099	38.86%	Nestor Joannes (PCS)	456	3.48%	13,322	1,037	82.00%

== Honours ==
=== Honours of Malaysia ===
- Malaysia
  - Commander of the Order of the Defender of the Realm (PMN) – Tan Sri (2010)
- Pahang
  - Grand Knight of the Order of Sultan Ahmad Shah of Pahang (SSAP) – Dato' Sri (1988)
- Sabah
  - Grand Commander of the Order of Kinabalu (SPDK) – Datuk Seri Panglima (1986)
  - Justice of the Peace (JP) (1985)

== See also ==
- 1991 Sabah political arrests
- Parti Bersatu Sabah (PBS) or United Sabah Party
- Kadazandusun Cultural Association (KDCA)

Political offices
Preceded by Harris Salleh	Chief Minister of Sabah; 1985–1994	Succeeded by Sakaran Dandai
