= 1986 Sabah riots =

Civil disorder in Malaysia

The 1986 Sabah riots, also known as The Silent Riot, occurred between March and May in various locations around the state of Sabah, Malaysia. The riots centred mainly in the capital Kota Kinabalu, as well as in the towns of Tawau and Sandakan. On 12 March, seven plastic explosives were detonated in Kota Kinabalu. A bomb was also detonated in Tawau. At least five bombs exploded in Sandakan killing one newspaper vendor and injuring a senior Police Field Force officer. The riots resulted in the death of 5 people.

== History ==
The riots occurred in response to the results of the 1985 state election, whereby the newly formed Parti Bersatu Sabah (United Sabah Party) won, ousting Parti Berjaya from the helm of government. Berjaya was the previous ruling party and a component party of Barisan Nasional (BN), the nation's and federal ruling coalition party. It was reported that mobs took to the streets to bring down the president of PBS Pairin Kitingan from the Chief Minister post.

It was also suspected that the riots were triggered by the losing parties including BN to bring forth a proclamation of emergency to justify a takeover by the federal government similar to those which happened in 1966 in Sarawak and 1977 in Kelantan.

Pairin, himself a former member of Party Berjaya, formed PBS barely 47 days before the elections. Opponents of PBS, namely, Harris Salleh of Berjaya, and Tun Mustapha of USNO were dissatisfied with the result. Tun Mustapha then sought to get sworn in as Chief Minister illegally, and this resulted in a court battle which ended in favour of Pairin.

PBS later sought to have snap election because of political manoeuvring causing PBS representatives to defect. Malaysian Prime Minister Mahathir Mohamad also tried to negotiate with PBS to form a coalition with BN in return for peace in the state. Finally the election was held on 4 and 5 May 1986. PBS won again and this time with a bigger margin.

== Legacy ==
A documentary on the 1986 riots was created by Sabahan film-maker Nadira Ilana released in 2012 called The Silent Riot. The film emerged as one of the winning proposals for the Freedom Film Fest (FFF) 2012.
