= 1999 Sabah state election =

State election in Sabah, Malaysia

| ← 1994 | 12–13 March 1999 | 2004 → |

All 48 seats in the Sabah State Legislative Assembly 25 seats needed for a majority
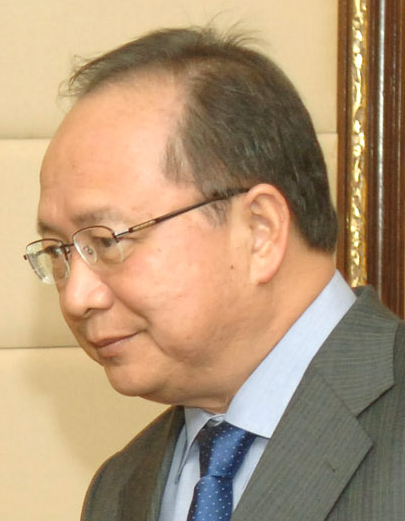

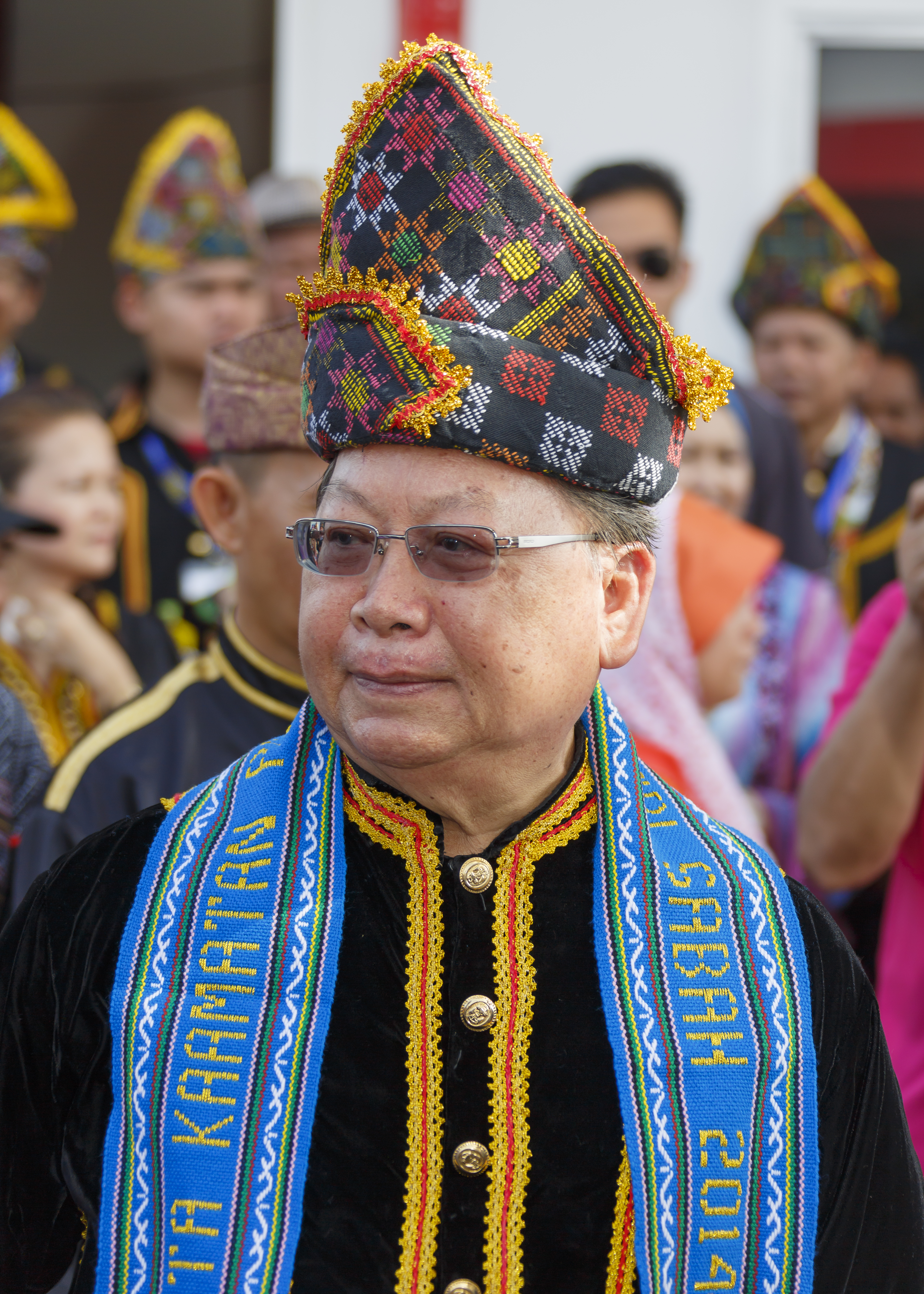
| | Majority party | Minority party |
|---|---|---|
| Leader | Bernard Giluk Dompok | Joseph Pairin Kitingan |
| Party | PDS | PBS |
| Alliance | Barisan Nasional |
| Leader since | 1998 | 1985 |
| Leader's seat | Moyog (defeated) | Tambunan |
| Last election | 23 | 25 |
| Seats won | 31 | 17 |
| Seat change | ▲8 | ▼8 |
Chief Minister before election
Bernard Giluk Dompok
BN-PDS
Elected Chief Minister
Osu Sukam
BN-UMNO

The 1999 Sabah state election was held between Friday, 12 March and Saturday, 13 March 1999. The election was won by Barisan Nasional increasing the number of seats it won in the 1994 election from 23 to 31.

== Background ==
The Sabah State Assembly were dissolved by the Yang Dipertua Negeri of Sabah with advice from the Sabah Chief Minister (CM), on 22 February 1999, 24 days before the 5 year term of the assembly expires, paving way for the state election. The nomination day were set by the Election Commission of Malaysia to be on 2 March, with a 10 day campaigning period between nomination day and election day.

Barisan Nasional, who has governed the state since 1994 after 20 Parti Bersatu Sabah (PBS) Member of Legislative Assembly (MLA) crossed over to support BN barely 1 month after PBS has won the 1994 election, contested in all 48 seats, split between its component parties. The announcement of BN seat allocations were made by BN Sabah chief, Bernard Dompok on 28 February, with United Malays National Organisation (UMNO) 24 seats, Parti Demokratik Sabah (PDS) 12 seats, Sabah Progressive Party (SAPP) 5 seats, Liberal Democratic Party (LDP) 2 seats, Angkatan Keadilan Rakyat (AKAR) 2 seats, Parti Bersatu Rakyat Sabah (PBRS) 2 seats and Malaysian Chinese Association (MCA) 1 seat. Almost all leaders of BN Sabah component parties are defending their seats except AKAR president Pandikar Amin Mulia, who were expected to be made as Senator in the Dewan Negara and be named as a Minister in the federal government. For MCA, this is the first time the party is contesting in Sabah after gaining one seat through the defection of Chau Tet On from PBS in 1994, and later made as MCA Sabah leader. On is defending his seat in Api-Api. Both PDS (led by Dompok) and PBRS (led by Joseph Kurup), parties created by PBS assemblymen who were defecting to BN in 1994, were also contesting the state elections for the first time.

PBS, who had won the 1994 election but forced to become opposition less than a month later, also fields candidate in all 48 seats. The party's campaign mainly focus on 'revenge' against its former MLAs who had caused the collapse of PBS government in 1994. Led by longtime leader Joseph Pairin Kitingan, the party were strengthened by return of its former stalwarts like Joseph's brother Jeffery Kitingan, Mark Koding and Clarance Bongkos Malakun. They are being fielded by the party in the seats that is held by the defected MLA to BN.

Federated Sabah People's Front (BERSEKUTU), is another party who contested in all 48 seats. The party first contested in the 1994 election on 6 seats, but defeated on all of them. This time though, the party were led by Harris Salleh, the former Sabah CM from 1976-1985 when he led the BERJAYA party to govern Sabah during that period. Harris has been an UMNO member after BERJAYA and USNO merged into UMNO Sabah in 1991, before exiting the party in 1998 and joining BERSEKUTU.

Other parties who contested in the election includes United Democratic Sabah People's Power Party (SETIA), Pan-Malaysian Islamic Party (PAS), and United Pasok Nunukragang National Organisation (PASOK) who were making its return to Sabah election since last competing in 1986. 27 independent candidates also contested the election.

Democratic Action Party, who has contested every Sabah election bar one since 1981, decided not to contest this election to focus on the upcoming general election, and instead encourage its supporters to vote for PBS.

== Results ==
| Party or alliance | | Votes | % | Seats | +/– |
|---|---|---|---|---|---|
| Barisan Nasional | United Malays National Organisation | 129,908 | 25.12 | 24 | +5 |
| Barisan Nasional | Sabah Progressive Party | 29,337 | 5.67 | 3 | 0 |
| Barisan Nasional | Liberal Democratic Party | 11,654 | 2.25 | 2 | +1 |
| Barisan Nasional | Sabah Democratic Party | 47,494 | 9.19 | 2 | New |
| Barisan Nasional | Malaysian Chinese Association | 5,963 | 1.15 | 0 | New |
| Barisan Nasional | Parti Bersatu Rakyat Sabah | 7,526 | 1.46 | 0 | New |
| Barisan Nasional | Angkatan Keadilan Rakyat | 8,033 | 1.55 | 0 | -1 |
| Barisan Nasional | Total | 239,915 | 46.40 | 31 | +6 |
| United Sabah Party | | 213,432 | 41.28 | 17 | -8 |
| Federated Sabah People's Front | | 54,732 | 10.59 | 0 | 0 |
| United Democratic Sabah People's Power Party | | 4,193 | 0.81 | 0 | 0 |
| Pan-Malaysian Islamic Party | | 1,352 | 0.26 | 0 | 0 |
| United Pasok Nunukragang National Organisation | | 18 | 0.00 | 0 | 0 |
| Independents | | 3,422 | 0.66 | 0 | 0 |
| Total | | 517,064 | 100.00 | 48 | 0 |
| Valid votes | | 517,064 | 98.13 | | |
| Invalid/blank votes | | 9,868 | 1.87 | | |
| Total votes | | 526,932 | 100.00 | | |
| Registered voters/turnout | | 726,690 | 72.51 | | |

== Aftermath ==
=== CM rotation system ===
After BN regains power in Sabah in 1994, it introduced Chief Minister rotation system between Muslim bumiputera, Non-Muslim bumiputera, and Chinese leaders for two year tenure each. This was one of the promises of BN during the 1994 election campaign. For the Muslim bumiputera quota, Osu Sukam of UMNO becomes CM after BN won in the 1999 elections. He held the role until 2001, when Chong Kah Kiat of LDP becomes CM, filling the Chinese/Non-Muslim bumiputera quota in a slightly changed rotation system. In 2003, Kah Kiat hands over the CM role to Musa Aman from UMNO, who scrapped the rotation system after BN dominates in the 2004 state election, with 59 wins out of 60 seats contested.

=== End of PDS, UPKO reemerges ===
Heading into the elections, incumbent CM Bernard Dompok's PDS contested in 12 seats. The allocation of seats contested is the second largest in BN Sabah, after UMNO (24). But PDS were routed in the election, having lost all but 2 of their seats to PBS candidates, including Bernard. The loss is viewed by observers as a rejection of Kadazan-Dusun and Murut (KDM) community towards the party, who have seceded from another major KDM party PBS in 1994. In the aftermath of PDS poor performance, Bernard lost the Sabah CM role, and the state BN chairman role that he held when he was appointed the Sabah CM in 1998, to UMNO Sabah chairman Osu Sukam. On 8 August 1999, at the party's fifth congress, PDS was renamed as United Pasokmomogun Kadazandusun Murut Organisation (UPKO) taking the same UPKO acronym of the defunct original United Pasokmomogun Kadazan Organisation, which was formed and dissolved in the 1960s.

=== Performance of BN parties ===
Aside from PDS, other parties of BN suffers defeat in the election. PBRS, AKAR and MCA were wiped out, with the party leaders Joseph Kurup (PBRS) and Chau Tet On (MCA) lost in their seats to PBS candidate. UMNO, SAPP and LDP were the only BN parties beside PDS to win seats, with UMNO won in all 24 seats it contested, SAPP won three out of five equalling its 1994 election results, and LDP won both seats it contested gaining one more than the previous election. AKAR would be dissolved in 2001, with its president Pandikar Amin Mulia and most of the members joining UMNO.

After UMNO's perfect performance in this election, the leader of the state's UMNO would led the BN Sabah.

=== PBS rejoins BN ===
PBS performance in the election were credible, and won seats in all Non-Muslim Bumiputera majority areas, showing that they could still commands trust among those communities. But the party were handed its first defeat since its first state election in 1985 and failed to wrestle control of the state from BN. After further PBS MLA and MP defections to the government party, PBS central committee decided on 2001 to apply for re-entry into BN, and was officially accepted back into BN on 23 January 2002. This contributed to the near-domination of BN in the 2004 election as stated above.

As of 2025, this is the last election PBS was considered as a major party in Sabah, as afterwards PBS only exists as a coalition partner for other parties.

=== Other parties ===
None of other parties beside BN and PBS gain any seats in the election, including Harris-lead BERSEKUTU who lost in all 48 seats. Harris lost in Likas against BN-SAPP leader and incumbent MLA Yong Teck Lee. Harris would exit the party after the election, not contesting in any election afterwards.
