= Pensiangan (federal constituency) =

Federal constituency of Sabah, Malaysia

Pensiangan (P182)
Sabah constituency

Federal constituency
- Legislature: Dewan Rakyat
- MP: Arthur Joseph Kurup; BN
- Constituency created: 1984
- Constituency abolished: 1995
- Constituency re-created: 2003
- First contested: 1986
- Last contested: 2022

Demographics
- Population (2020): 82,499
- Electors (2025): 60,292
- Area (km²): 8,897
- Pop. density (per km²): 9.3

Pensiangan is a federal constituency in Interior Division (Keningau District and Nabawan District), Sabah, Malaysia, that has been represented in the Dewan Rakyat from 1986 to 1995, and again from 2004 to present.

The federal constituency was created in the 1984 redistribution and is mandated to return a single member to the Dewan Rakyat under the first past the post voting system.

== Demographics ==
https://ge15.orientaldaily.com.my/seats/sabah/p

Ethnic breakdown of Pensiangan's electorate as of 2022
1. Sabah Bumiputera (87.3%)
2. Malay-Muslim Bumiputera (7.40%)
3. Chinese (3.50%)
4. Other ethnicities (1.80%)

As of 2020, Pensiangan has a population of 82,499 people.

Age breakdown of Pensiangan's electorate as of 2022
1. 18-20 (9.59%)
2. 21-29 (28.2%)
3. 30-39 (24.9%)
4. 40-49 (14.5%)
5. 50-59 (10.8%)
6. 60-69 (6.36%)
7. 70-79 (2.45%)
8. 80-89 (1.67%)
9. above 90 (1.52%)
Gender breakdown of Pensiangan's electorate as of 2022
1. Male (50.1%)
2. Female (49.9%)

== History ==
It was abolished in 1995 when it was redistributed. It was re-created in 2003.

=== Polling districts ===
According to the gazette issued on 21 November 2025, the Pensiangan constituency has a total of 38 polling districts.

State constituency	Polling Districts	Code	Location
Tulid（N44）	Sinulihan	182/44/01	SK Kabatang Baru
Tulid（N44）	Mansiat	182/44/02	SK Mansiat
Tulid（N44）	Tulid	182/44/03	SMK Tulid
Tulid（N44）	Sungoi	182/44/04	SK Kapayan Baru
Tulid（N44）	Marapok	182/44/05	SK Ambual; SK Sodomon
Tulid（N44）	Magatang	182/44/06	SK Magatang; SK Pengagtan
Tulid（N44）	Menawo	182/44/07	SK Menawo
Tulid（N44）	Simbuan	182/44/08	SK Simbuan Tulid
Tulid（N44）	Lanas	182/44/09	SK Lanas
Sook（N45）	Malima	182/45/01	SK Delayan Tulid; SK Malima
Sook（N45）	Sook	182/45/02	SMK Sook
Sook（N45）	Barasanon	182/45/03	SK Kebulu
Sook（N45）	Ansip	182/45/04	SK Pekan Keningau II; SK Kampong Biah
Sook（N45）	Mambulu	182/45/05	SK Membulu
Sook（N45）	Karamatoi	182/45/06	SK Karamatoi
Sook（N45）	Dalit	182/45/07	SK Dalit
Sook（N45）	Kalampun	182/45/08	SK Kalampun
Sook（N45）	Malaing	182/45/09	SK Malaing
Sook（N45）	Lumiri	182/45/10	SK Mamagun
Sook（N45）	Bonor	182/45/11	SK Bonor
Sook（N45）	Tiulon	182/45/12	SK Rancangan Belia Tiulon; SK Kawakaan
Nabawan（N46）	Nabawan	182/46/01	SK Pekan Nabawan; SMK Nabawan; SK Kebu Baru; SK Kg Bahagia
Nabawan（N46）	Pandewan	182/46/02	SK Pandiwan
Nabawan（N46）	Ponontomon	182/46/03	SK Ponontomon
Nabawan（N46）	Saliu	182/46/04	SK Pengaraan
Nabawan（N46）	Sabinait	182/46/05	SK Kuala Salong
Nabawan（N46）	Sapulot	182/46/06	SMK Sepulot Nabawan
Nabawan（N46）	Tataluan	182/46/07	SK Labang
Nabawan（N46）	Saliku	182/46/08	SK Saliku
Nabawan（N46）	Longongon	182/46/09	SK Longongon
Nabawan（N46）	Pensiangan	182/46/10	SK Pekan Pensiangan
Nabawan（N46）	Sibangali	182/46/11	SK Sibangali
Nabawan（N46）	Pohon Batu	182/46/12	SK Pohon Batu
Nabawan（N46）	Salinatan	182/46/13	SK Salinatan
Nabawan（N46）	Babalitan	182/46/14	SK Babalitan
Nabawan（N46）	Saliliran	182/46/15	SK Saliliran

=== Representation history ===
Members of Parliament for Pensiangan
Parliament	No	Years	Member	Party	Vote Share
Constituency created from Keningau
7th	P150	1986-1990	Taimin Lumaing	BN (PBS)	5,196; 75.02%
8th	P150	1990-1995	Taimin Lumaing	GR (PBS)	7,701; 84.67%
Constituency abolished, split into Tenom and Keningau
Constituency re-created from Keningau
11th	P182	2004-2008	Bernard Stephen Maraat	BN (PBRS)	6,080; 51.01%
12th	P182	2008-2013	Joseph Kurup	BN (PBRS)	Uncontested
13th	P182	2013-2018	Joseph Kurup	BN (PBRS)	9,467; 45.31%
14th	P182	2018	Arthur Joseph Kurup	BN (PBRS)	11,783; 48.35%
14th	P182	2018-2020	Arthur Joseph Kurup	PBRS	11,783; 48.35%
14th	P182	2020–2022	Arthur Joseph Kurup	BN (PBRS)	11,783; 48.35%
15th	P182	2022–present	Arthur Joseph Kurup	BN (PBRS)	19,623; 52.88%

=== State constituency ===
Parliamentary constituency	State constituency					
Parliamentary constituency	1967–1974	1974–1985	1985–1995	1995–2004	2004–2020	2020–present
Pensiangan			Nabawan		Nabawan	
Pensiangan			Sook		Sook	
Pensiangan						Tulid

=== Historical boundaries ===
State Constituency	Area		
State Constituency	1984	2003	2019
Nabawan	Nabawan; Tibow; Pensiangan; Sapulut; Sibangali		
Sook	Ansip; Marapok; Sook; Tiulon; Tulid		Ansip; Dalit; Sook; Tiulon; Totogop
Tulid			Lanas; Marapok; Menawo; Sinulihan; Tulid

=== Current state assembly members ===
No.	State Constituency	Member	Coalition (Party)
N44	Tulid	Jordan Jude Ellron	IND
N45	Sook	Arthur Joseph Kurup	BN (PBRS)
N46	Nabawan	Abdul Ghani Mohamed Yassin	GRS (GAGASAN)

=== Local governments & postcodes ===
No.	State Constituency	Local Government	Postcode
N44	Tulid	Keningau District Council	89000 Keningau; 89950 Nabawan
N45	Sook	Keningau District Council	89000 Keningau; 89950 Nabawan
N46	Nabawan	Nabawan District Council	89000 Keningau; 89950 Nabawan

== Election results ==
Malaysian general election, 2022
Party	Candidate	Votes	%	∆%
BN	Arthur Joseph Kurup	19,623	52.88	▲4.53
PH	Sangkar Rasam	14,211	38.29	▲38.29
KDM	Jekerison Kilan	1,642	4.40	▲4.40
Heritage	Siti Noorhasmahwatty Osman	1,512	4.07	▲4.07
PEJUANG	Jamani Derimin @ Gampalid	124	0.33	▲0.33
Total valid votes		37,710	100.00	
Total rejected ballots		383		
Unreturned ballots		91		
Turnout		37,584	66.66	▼12.87
Registered electors		55,672		
Majority		5,412	14.59	▲5.09
BN hold		Swing		
Source(s) https://lom.agc.gov.my/ilims/upload/portal/akta/outputp/1753262/PUB619_2022.pdf

Malaysian general election, 2018
Party	Candidate	Votes	%	∆%
BN	Arthur Joseph Kurup	11,783	48.35	▲3.04
PKR	Raymond Ahuar	9,469	38.86	▲1.91
Homeland Solidarity Party	Joh Jimmy @ Richard Joe Jimmy	2,839	11.65	▼5.36
Love Sabah Party	Maidin Atak @ Maidin Osman	212	0.87	▲0.87
Independent	Engah Sintan @ Dahlan Abdullah	65	0.27	▲0.27
Total valid votes		24,368	100.00	
Total rejected ballots		528		
Unreturned ballots		59		
Turnout		24,955	79.53	▼2.13
Registered electors		31,377		
Majority		2,314	9.50	▲1.10
BN hold		Swing		
Source(s) "His Majesty's Government Gazette - Notice of Contested Election, Parliament for the State of Sabah [P.U. (B) 246/2018]" (PDF). Attorney General's Chambers of Malaysia. 3 May 2018. "Federal Government Gazette - Results of Contested Election and Statements of the Poll after the Official Addition of Votes, Parliamentary Constituencies for the State of Sabah [P.U. (B) 320/2018]" (PDF). Attorney General's Chambers of Malaysia. 28 May 2018. Archived from the original (PDF) on 29 December 2019.

Malaysian general election, 2013
Party	Candidate	Votes	%	∆%
BN	Joseph Kurup	9,467	45.31	▲45.31
PKR	Richard Sakian Gunting	7,723	36.95	▲36.95
STAR	Martin Tomy @ Tommy	3,554	17.01	▲17.01
Independent	Fatimah Agitor @ Mohd Daud	152	0.73	▲0.73
Total valid votes		20,896	100.00	
Total rejected ballots		483		
Unreturned ballots		12		
Turnout		21,391	81.66	
Registered electors		26,194		
Majority		1,744	8.40	
BN hold		Swing		
Source(s) "Federal Government Gazette - Notice of Contested Election, Parliament for the State of Sabah [P.U. (B) 183/2013]" (PDF). Attorney General's Chambers of Malaysia. 26 April 2013. Archived from the original (PDF) on 30 September 2018. "Federal Government Gazette - Results of Contested Election and Statements of the Poll after the Official Addition of Votes, Parliamentary Constituencies for the State of Sabah [P.U. (B) 224/2013]" (PDF). Attorney General's Chambers of Malaysia. 22 May 2013. Archived from the original (PDF) on 30 September 2018.

Malaysian general election, 2008
Party	Candidate	Votes	%	∆%
On the nomination day, Joseph Kurup won uncontested.
BN	Joseph Kurup			
Total valid votes			100.00	
Total rejected ballots				
Unreturned ballots				
Turnout				
Registered electors				
Majority				
BN hold		Swing		

Malaysian general election, 2004
Party	Candidate	Votes	%	∆%
BN	Bernard S. Maraat @ Ben	6,080	51.05	
Independent	Martin Tomy @ Tommy	5,272	44.27	
Independent	Samson S. Koroh @ Razali Suffian	557	4.68	
Total valid votes		11,909	100.00	
Total rejected ballots		552		
Unreturned ballots		2		
Turnout		12,463	68.95	
Registered electors		18,075		
Majority		808	6.78	
BN gain from PBS		Swing		?

Malaysian general election, 1990
Party	Candidate	Votes	%	∆%
PBS	Taimin Lumaing	7,701	84.67	▲84.67
DAP	Ampon @ Foo Tun Bung	1,394	15.33	▲15.33
Total valid votes		9,095	100.00	
Total rejected ballots		172		
Unreturned ballots		0		
Turnout		9,267	52.02	▲3.79
Registered electors		17,816		
Majority		6,307	69.34	▲19.30
PBS gain from BN		Swing		?

Malaysian general election, 1986
Party	Candidate	Votes	%
BN	Taimin Lumaing	5,196	75.02
Independent	Peter Kodou	1,730	24.98
Total valid votes		6,926	100.00
Total rejected ballots		160	
Unreturned ballots		0	
Turnout		7,086	48.23
Registered electors		14,693	
Majority		3,466	50.04
This was a new constituency created.
