= Joseph Kurup =

Malaysian politician (1944–2024)

Yang Berbahagia Tan Sri Datuk Seri Panglima Joseph Kurup PSM SPDK SSAP PGDK
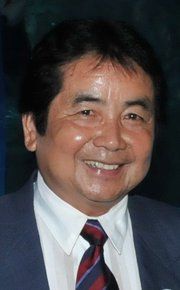

Federal Ministerial Roles
- 2008–2009: Deputy Minister of Rural and Regional Development
- 2009–2013: Deputy Minister of Natural Resources and Environment
- 2013–2018: Minister in the Prime Minister's Department

Ministerial Roles (Sabah)
- 1985–1986: Minister of Agriculture and Fisheries
- 1986–1990: Deputy Chief Minister
- 1986–1990: Minister of Communication and Works
- 1990–1994: Minister of Finance
- 1994–1999: Deputy Chief Minister
- 1994–1996: Minister of Industrial Development
- 1996–1999: Minister of Resource Development and Enterprise
- 2001–2004: Minister of Youth and Sports

Faction represented in Dewan Rakyat
- 2008–2018: Barisan Nasional

Faction represented in the Sabah State Legislative Assembly
- 1985–1990: Barisan Nasional
- 1990–1994: United Sabah Party
- 1994–1999: Barisan Nasional
- 2001–2008: Barisan Nasional

Personal details
- Born: 15 December 1944 Pensiangan, Keningau, Japanese-occupied North Borneo (now Sabah, Malaysia)
- Died: 17 April 2024 (aged 79) Kuala Lumpur, Malaysia
- Party: United Sabah Party (PBS) (1985–1994); United Sabah People's Party (PBRS) (1994–2024)
- Other political affiliations: Barisan Nasional (BN) (1986–2018, 2020–2024); Gabungan Rakyat Sabah (GRS) (2020–2024)
- Spouse: Mak Soak Fong (life partner 1976)
- Children: 3 (including Arthur)

Joseph Kurup (15 December 1944 – 17 April 2024) was a Malaysian politician who served as the 1st and founding President of the United Sabah People's Party (PBRS), a component party of the Barisan Nasional (BN) coalition from March 1994 to January 2023, Minister in the Prime Minister's Department, Deputy Minister of Energy and Natural Resources and Deputy Minister of Rural and Regional Development in the BN administration under former Prime Ministers Abdullah Ahmad Badawi and Najib Razak from March 2008 to May 2018. He served as the Member of Parliament (MP) for Pensiangan from March 2008 to May 2018. He also served as Deputy Chief Minister of Sabah, State Minister of Agriculture and Fisheries, State Minister of Communications and Works, State Minister of Finance, State Minister of Industrial Development, State Minister of Resource Development and Enterprise and State Minister of Youth and Sports of Sabah under former Chief Ministers Joseph Pairin Kitingan, Sakaran Dandai, Salleh Said Keruak, Yong Teck Lee, Bernard Giluk Dompok, Osu Sukam, Chong Kah Kiat and Musa Aman in the BN state administration from 1985 to 2004. He was a founding member of the PBRS and was a member of the Parti Bersatu Sabah (PBS). He was also the father of Arthur Joseph Kurup, the Deputy Minister of Agriculture and Food Security, Pensiangan MP and PBRS President. Kurup died in Kuala Lumpur on 17 April 2024, at the age of 79.

== Sabah state politics (1985–2008) ==
Kurup was a member of the United Sabah Party (PBS) when it was founded in 1985. In the 1985 election he won the seat of Sook in the Sabah State Legislative Assembly, and the PBS, led by Joseph Pairin Kitingan, toppled the BN government. Over the following nine years, Kurup served as a minister in Kitingan's government.

In 1994, Joseph Kitingan's government came to an end after a series of defections from the PBS to BN. Kurup was one of the leaders of the defectors, setting up the PBRS, gaining admission for the new party to the BN coalition, and winning appointment as Deputy Chief Minister in the new BN state government. In 1999, Kurup faced his first electoral test since the defection in which he suffered a double defeat when he lost to Joseph Kitingan in the federal seat of Keningau, as did Kitingan's younger brother, Jeffrey Kitingan of PBS too in the State Assembly seat of Bingkor. Jeffrey had left the PBS to join the PBRS in 1999 later and he had challenged Kurup for the PBRS presidency in 2002, but Kurup managed to survive after a decision by the Registrar of Societies. It was not until the 2004 election, after the PBS had also joined the BN, when Kurup returned to an elected position, winning back the State Assembly seat of Sook.

== Federal politics (2008–2018) ==
Kurup was elected to the federal Parliament in the 2008 general election, giving up his State Assembly seat to replace PBRS Secretary-General Bernard Maraat as the party's candidate in the seat of Pensiangan. He was elected unopposed after the People's Justice Party (PKR) candidate had been unable to submit his nomination on time. PKR challenged Kurup's election in court, but Kurup prevailed. After his election, Prime Minister Abdullah Badawi appointed Kurup as Deputy Minister for Rural and Regional Development. He shifted to Deputy Minister for Natural Resources and Environment when Najib Razak became Prime Minister in 2009. After defending his seat in the 2013 general election, he was promoted to Cabinet, as Minister in the Prime Minister's Department. After 33 years in politics, Kurup decided not to participate in the 2018 general election to pass the duty of defending his Pensiangan parliament seat to his son, Arthur Joseph Kurup.

== President of Parti Bersatu Rakyat Sabah (1994–2023) ==
On 12 February 2022 during the opening of third tri-annual convention of PBRS, he spoke that PBRS needed more seats, Senator and nominated member of the Sabah State Legislative Assembly (MLA) positions to work efficiently as a political party and warned that PBRS could not grow stronger and contribute more for BN if it was left out in many aspects by speaking that "due to the pressure from our grassroots and in our efforts to strengthen the party, it is important that PBRS is given a bigger role to play". He also added that PBRS made the requests to the BN secretariat during the 2020 Sabah state election, but it was disappointed that no nominated MLA from PBRS had been appointed. He also noted that the current political scene was moving towards to the youth but it was also important that veterans leaders not to be sidelined. On the issues of illegal immigrant of Sabah, he urged the federal government to intervene and help mitigate the rising cost of living woes faced by the people in Sabah and disagreed that the proposed special card for foreigners could solve the long-standing issue. In response, BN Chairman Ahmad Zahid Hamidi who was also in attendance said that PBRS was never sidelined and would always be given priority it deserved and revealed that he "had given Sabah BN the power to manage its matters, so Sabah BN Chairman Bung Moktar Radin would handle the things here". On 7 January 2023, he stepped down as the PBRS President after helming the party from its formation in 1994 to 2023 for 29 years. Deputy President and his son Arthur Joseph Kurup took over as the 2nd Party President.

== Election results ==
Parliament of Malaysia
| Year | Constituency | Candidate | Votes | Pct | Opponent(s) | Votes | Pct | Ballots cast | Majority | Turnout |
|---|---|---|---|---|---|---|---|---|---|---|
| 1999 | P180 Keningau | Joseph Kurup (PBRS) | 12,533 | 49.51% | Joseph Pairin Kitingan (PBS) | 12,783 | 50.49% | 25,602 | 250 | 64.05% |
| 2008 | P182 Pensiangan | Joseph Kurup (PBRS) | Unopposed | | | | | | | |
| 2013 | P182 Pensiangan | Joseph Kurup (PBRS) | 9,467 | 45.31% | Richard Sakian Gunting (PKR) | 7,723 | 36.95% | 21,391 | 1,744 | 81.66% |
| 2013 | P182 Pensiangan | Joseph Kurup (PBRS) | 9,467 | 45.31% | Martin Tomy @ Tommy (STAR) | 3,554 | 17.01% | 21,391 | 1,744 | 81.66% |
| 2013 | P182 Pensiangan | Joseph Kurup (PBRS) | 9,467 | 45.31% | Fatimah Agitor @ Mohd Daud (IND) | 152 | 0.73% | 21,391 | 1,744 | 81.66% |

Sabah State Legislative Assembly
| Year | Constituency | Candidate | Votes | Pct | Opponent(s) | Votes | Pct | Ballots cast | Majority | Turnout |
|---|---|---|---|---|---|---|---|---|---|---|
| 1999 | N28 Bingkor | Joseph Kurup (PBRS) | 4,871 | 35.75% | Jeffrey Kitingan (PBS) | 8,339 | 61.19% | 13,744 | 3,468 | 72.30% |
| 1999 | N28 Bingkor | Joseph Kurup (PBRS) | 4,871 | 35.75% | Kuilan Anggau (BERSEKUTU) | 395 | 2.90% | 13,744 | 3,468 | 72.30% |
| 1999 | N28 Bingkor | Joseph Kurup (PBRS) | 4,871 | 35.75% | Peter Kodou (IND) | 22 | 0.16% | 13,744 | 3,468 | 72.30% |
| 2004 | N37 Sook | Joseph Kurup (PBRS) | 3,973 | 50.90% | Jeffrey Kitingan (IND) | 3,578 | 45.83% | 7,984 | 395 | 70.53% |

== Honours ==
=== Honours of Malaysia ===
- Malaysia
  - Commander of the Order of Loyalty to the Crown of Malaysia (PSM) – Tan Sri (1999)
- Pahang
  - Grand Knight of the Order of Sultan Ahmad Shah of Pahang (SSAP) – Dato' Sri (2013)
- Sabah
  - Grand Commander of the Order of Kinabalu (SPDK) – Datuk Seri Panglima (1994)
  - Commander of the Order of Kinabalu (PGDK) – Datuk (1987)
