= Nadira Ilana =

Malaysian filmmaker

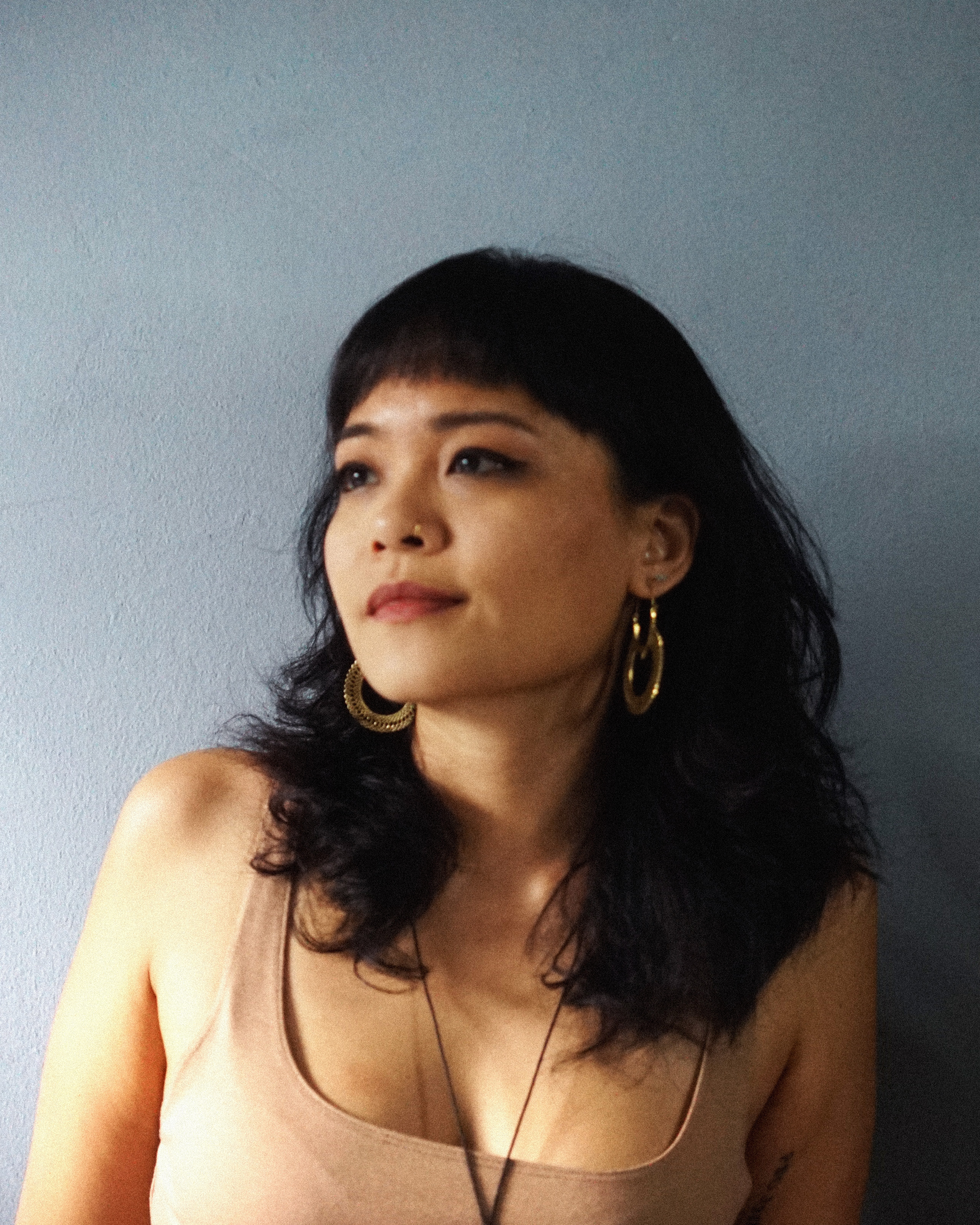
- Occupations: Filmmaker, independent film programmer and writer

Nadira Ilana is a Malaysian filmmaker, independent film programmer and writer of mixed indigenous Dusun heritage from Kota Kinabalu, Sabah. In 2016 she established film production company Telan Bulan Films with the aim of producing and promoting contemporary work from indigenous and minority creators.

She is an alumna of the Berlinale Talent Campus, BIFAN NAFF Fantastic Film School, Singapore International Film Festival's SEA Film Lab and the Luang Prabang Film Festival Talent Lab.

== Education and career ==
Ilana was born and raised in Kota Kinabalu, Sabah, and earned a Bachelors of Fine Arts in Film & TV from the Queensland University of Technology, Australia, after attending Montclair State University in New Jersey for a year, during which time she interned at film and documentary production houses in Manhattan.

Upon returning to Malaysia, Ilana produced and directed The Silent Riot, a 2012 documentary on the 1986 Sabah riots that won the Best Human Rights Award at the Freedom Film Fest in 2013. She has since made Big Stories Bongkud-Namaus, which won in 2013, and the short film "Were the Sun and the Moon to Meet", which won Best Short Film (Open Category) at the Mini Film Festival in 2021.

In 2016, Nadira was part of the Big Stories, Small Towns project. She conducted a year-long film residency in Kampung Bongkud and Kampung Namaus, two remote Kadazan-Dusun villages in Ranau, and the collaboration with the community resulted in 14 short documentaries and 3 photo series.

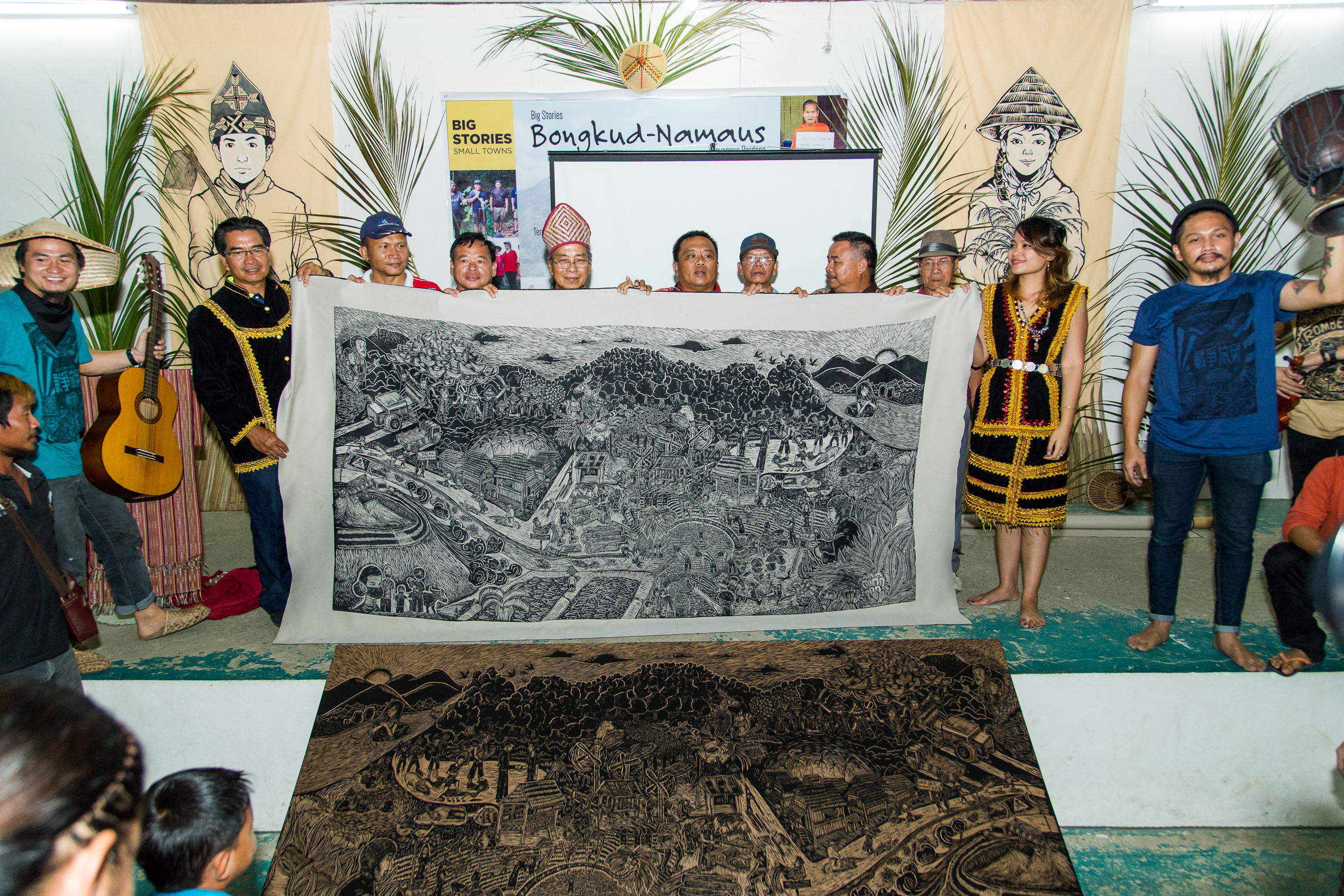
Launch of Big Stories Bongkud-Namaus (2016). Guests hold up a woodcut print by Pangrok Sulap produced in collaboration with the community.

In 2017 her short documentary titled, 'Anak Pokok/Saplings', which was produced in collaboration with Tropical Rainforest and Research Conservation Centre won first runner up at the SXSW Community screening for Rainforest Partnership´s Films for the Forest judged by Richard Linklater and Raveena Tandon.

Her most recent short film 'Were the Sun and the Moon to Meet' or 'Tadau om Vuhan Kopisoomo' in the Kadazan language was first selected for Short Shorts Film Festival and Asia and was in competition for the International Shorts Category. The film went on to win Best Short Film at Mini Film Festival in Sarawak.

== Community Building ==
Nadira is also an active organizer of film communities such as Working Title Film Drinks (2013-2016), a monthly gathering of professional filmmakers and enthusiast in Kuala Lumpur, which is now an active online group dedicated to Malaysia's independent film scene. In 2019 she was the youngest individual on the FINAS Panel of Advisors representing Sabah and Young Filmmakers.

The Sabahan filmmaker was a judge for Projek Dialog's Pesta Filem Kita, Petron Vision in 2017 as well as the Malaysian short film competition, BMW Shorties from 2016 to 2019.

== Filmography ==
Year	Title	Note
2011	Dream Cradle	Director
2012	Lastik	Director
2013	The Silent Riot	Director
2016	Old Souls	
2016	Big Stories Bongkud-Namaus - 14 micro documentaries	
2018	Anak Pokok/Saplings	Producer
2020	Tadau om Vuhan Kopisoomo / Were the Sun and the Moon to Meet	
2021	Mansau Ansau	
2021	Menuai Kisah', a 4-part Kaamatan video series for Maxis	
