= Sook (state constituency) =

State constituency in Sabah, Malaysia

Sook (N45)
Sabah constituency

State constituency
- Legislature: Sabah State Legislative Assembly
MLA
Arthur Joseph Kurup
BN
- Constituency created: 1974
- Constituency abolished: 1994
- Constituency re-created: 2004
- Last contested: 2025

Demographics
- Electors (2025): 20,349

Sook is a state constituency in Sabah, Malaysia, that is represented in the Sabah State Legislative Assembly.

== History ==
As of 2020, Sook has a population of 33,311 people.

== Demographics ==
Ethnic breakdown of Sook's electorate as of 2025
1. Non-Muslim Bumiputera (70.7%)
2. Muslim Bumiputera (27.0%)
3. Chinese (2.30%)
4. Other ethnicities (0.00%)

=== Polling districts ===
According to the gazette issued on 31 October 2022, the Sook constituency has a total of 12 polling districts.

State constituency	Polling Districts	Code	Location
Sook（N45）	Malima	182/45/01	SK Delayan Tulid; SK Malima
Sook（N45）	Sook	182/45/02	SMK Sook
Sook（N45）	Barasanon	182/45/03	SK Kebulu
Sook（N45）	Ansip	182/45/04	SK Pekan Keningau II; SK Kampong Biah
Sook（N45）	Mambulu	182/45/05	SK Membulu
Sook（N45）	Karamatoi	182/45/06	SK Karamatoi
Sook（N45）	Dalit	182/45/07	SK Dalit
Sook（N45）	Kalampun	182/45/08	SK Kalampun
Sook（N45）	Malaing	182/45/09	SK Malaing
Sook（N45）	Lumiri	182/45/10	SK Mamagun
Sook（N45）	Bonor	182/45/11	SK Bonor
Sook（N45）	Tiulon	182/45/12	SK Rancangan Belia Tiulon

=== Representation history ===
Member of Sabah State Legislative Assembly for Sook
Assembly	No	Years	Member	Party
Constituency created from Pensiangan-Sook
5th	N38	1976	Suffian Koroh	BERJAYA
5th	N38	1976 – 1981	Suffian Koroh	BN (BERJAYA)
6th	N38	1981–1985	Suffian Koroh	BN (BERJAYA)
7th	N41	1985–1986	Joseph Kurup	PBS
8th	N41	1986–1990	Joseph Kurup	PBS
9th	N41	1990–1994	Joseph Kurup	GR (PBS)
10th	N41	1994	Joseph Kurup	GR (PBS)
10th	N41	1994–1999	Joseph Kurup	BN (PBRS)
Constituency split into Pensiangan, Melalap and Bingkor
Constituency re-created from Pensiangan, Bingkor and Melalap
12th	N37	2004 – 2008	Joseph Kurup	BN (PBRS)
13th	N37	2008 – 2013	Ellron Alfred Angin	BN (PBRS)
14th	N37	2013 – 2018	Ellron Alfred Angin	BN (PBRS)
15th	N37	2018	Ellron Alfred Angin	BN (PBRS)
15th	N37	2018	Ellron Alfred Angin	Independent
15th	N37	2018 – 2020	Ellron Alfred Angin	STAR
15th	N37	2020	Ellron Alfred Angin	PN (STAR)
16th	N45	2020 – 2025	Ellron Alfred Angin	GRS (STAR)
16th	N45	2025	Ellron Alfred Angin	STAR
17th	N45	2025–present	Arthur Joseph Kurup	BN (PBRS)

== Election results ==
Sabah state election, 2025
Party	Candidate	Votes	%	∆%
BN	Arthur Joseph Kurup	8,307	57.90	▲38.08
GRS	Ellron Alfred Angin	3,580	24.95	▲24.95
Homeland Solidarity Party	Irenus Pagut	1,681	11.72	▲11.72
Heritage	Joseph Peter Tingi	708	4.93	▲4.93
Sabah Dream Party	V Chong Vin @ Siau Ho	71	0.49	▲0.49
Total valid votes		14,347		
Total rejected ballots		119		
Unreturned ballots		7		
Turnout		14,473	71.12	▼3.35
Registered electors		20,349		
Majority		4,727	32.95	▲17.04
BN gain from PN		Swing		?
Source(s) "RESULTS OF CONTESTED ELECTION AND STATEMENTS OF THE POLL AFTER THE OFFICIAL ADDITION OF VOTES" (PDF).

Sabah state election, 2020
Party	Candidate	Votes	%	∆%
PN	Ellron Alfred Angin	3,554	45.90	▲45.90
PKR	Raymond Ahuar	2,322	29.99	▲29.99
BN	Bonepes Been	1,535	19.82	▼32.05
LDP	Aning Ansawang	110	1.42	▲1.42
Love Sabah Party	Rebecca Taimin	88	1.14	▲1.14
Total valid votes		7,609	98.27	
Total rejected ballots		120	1.55	
Unreturned ballots		14	0.18	
Turnout		7,743	74.47	▼6.61
Registered electors		10,397		
Majority		1,232	15.91	▼13.02
PN gain from BN		Swing		?
Source(s) "RESULTS OF CONTESTED ELECTION AND STATEMENTS OF THE POLL AFTER THE OFFICIAL ADDITION OF VOTES".

Sabah state election, 2018
Party	Candidate	Votes	%	∆%
BN	Ellron Alfred Angin	8,042	51.87	▼1.45
Sabah Heritage Party	Martin Tomy @ Tommy	3,557	22.94	▲22.94
STAR	Baritus Gungkit @ Evaristus	3,402	21.94	▲12.89
ANAK NEGERI	Peter Beaty	113	0.73	▲0.73
Total valid votes		15,114	97.49	
Total rejected ballots		350	2.26	
Unreturned ballots		39	0.25	
Turnout		15,503	81.08	▼1.75
Registered electors		19,121		
Majority		4,485	28.93	▼3.51
BN hold		Swing		
Source(s) "RESULTS OF CONTESTED ELECTION AND STATEMENTS OF THE POLL AFTER THE OFFICIAL ADDITION OF VOTES".

Sabah state election, 2013
Party	Candidate	Votes	%	∆%
BN	Ellron Alfred Angin	7,223	53.32	▼6.10
STAR	Kustin Ladi	2,828	20.88	▲20.88
PKR	Liberty @ Alibi Lopog	1,911	14.11	▼22.27
SAPP	Chong Yu Chee @ Frankie	1,226	9.05	▲9.05
Independent	Rusayidi Abdullah	46	0.34	▲0.34
Total valid votes		13,234	97.70	
Total rejected ballots		301	2.22	
Unreturned ballots		11	0.08	
Turnout		13,546	82.83	▲9.21
Registered electors		16,354		
Majority		4,395	32.44	▲9.40
BN hold		Swing		
Source(s) "KEPUTUSAN PILIHAN RAYA UMUM DEWAN UNDANGAN NEGERI".

Sabah state election, 2008
Party	Candidate	Votes	%	∆%
BN	Ellron Alfred Angin	5,496	59.42	▼9.71
PKR	Paul Gitang	3,365	36.38	▲36.38
Independent	Suaidin Langkab @ Shuhaiddin Langab	202	2.18	▲2.18
BERSEKUTU	Sidum Manjin	124	1.34	▲1.34
Total valid votes		9,187	99.32	
Total rejected ballots		63	0.68	
Unreturned ballots		0	0.00	
Turnout		9,250	73.62	▲3.09
Registered electors		12,564		
Majority		2,131	23.04	▲18.10
BN hold		Swing		
Source(s) "KEPUTUSAN PILIHAN RAYA UMUM DEWAN UNDANGAN NEGERI SABAH BAGI TAHUN 2008".

Sabah state election, 2004
Party	Candidate	Votes	%	∆%
BN	Joseph Kurup	3,973	49.71	
Independent	Jeffrey Kitingan	3,578	44.77	
Independent	Yapilin Nawawi	252	3.15	
Total valid votes		7,803	97.64	
Total rejected ballots		181	2.26	
Unreturned ballots		8	0.10	
Turnout		7,992	70.53	
Registered electors		11,332		
Majority		395	4.94	
This was a new constituency created.
Source(s) "KEPUTUSAN PILIHAN RAYA UMUM DEWAN UNDANGAN NEGERI SABAH BAGI TAHUN 2004".

Sabah state election, 1994
Party	Candidate	Votes	%	∆%
PBS	Joseph Kurup	7,629	68.15	▼5.09
BN	Taimin Lumaing	3,565	31.85	▲31.85
Total valid votes		11,194	100.00	
Total rejected ballots		216		
Unreturned ballots		0		
Turnout		11,410	77.49	▼2.14
Registered electors		14,724		
Majority		4,064	36.31	▼18.02
PBS hold		Swing		{{{2}}}

Sabah state election, 1990
Party	Candidate	Votes	%	∆%
PBS	Joseph Kurup	7,026	73.24	▲7.81
USNO	Rizalman Abdullah	1,814	18.91	▲18.91
PRS	Demson Tom	497	5.18	▲5.18
BERJAYA	Michelan Adrain Robert	256	2.67	▼6.93
Total valid votes		9,593	100.00	
Total rejected ballots		78		
Unreturned ballots		21		
Turnout		9,692	79.63	▲4.70
Registered electors		12,172		
Majority		5,212	54.33	▲9.56
PBS hold		Swing		{{{2}}}

Sabah state election, 1986
Party	Candidate	Votes	%	∆%
PBS	Joseph Kurup	4,973	65.43	▲6.50
Independent	Demson Tom	1,570	20.65	▲20.65
BERJAYA	Albert Pensyl	730	9.60	▼18.81
Independent	Peter Kodou	328	4.32	▲4.32
Total valid votes		7,601	100.00	
Total rejected ballots		91		
Unreturned ballots		0		
Turnout		7,692	74.93	▲0.05
Registered electors		10,265		
Majority		3,403	44.77	▲14.25
PBS hold		Swing		{{{2}}}

Sabah state election, 1985
Party	Candidate	Votes	%	∆%
PBS	Joseph Kurup	3,808	58.93	▲58.93
BERJAYA	Suffian Koroh	1,836	28.41	▼36.37
USNO	Anip Ismail	735	11.37	▲11.37
BERSEPADU	Dullah Kandihong	83	1.28	▲1.28
Total valid votes		6,462	100.00	
Total rejected ballots		309		
Unreturned ballots		0		
Turnout		6,771	74.88	▲4.40
Registered electors		9,043		
Majority		1,972	30.52	▼3.82
PBS gain		Swing		{{{3}}}

Sabah state election, 1981
Party	Candidate	Votes	%	∆%
BERJAYA	Suffian Koroh	3,358	64.78	▼3.50
PASOK	Alibi Lopog	1,578	30.44	▲30.44
Independent	Edmund Otigil	176	3.40	▲3.40
Social Democratic Sabah Party	Yunus Kimin	56	1.08	▲1.08
Independent	Dullah Kandihong	16	0.31	▲0.31
Total valid votes		5,184	100.00	
Total rejected ballots		151		
Unreturned ballots		0		
Turnout		5,335	70.48	▼9.77
Registered electors		7,569		
Majority		1,780	34.34	▼2.99
BERJAYA hold		Swing		{{{2}}}

Sabah state election, 1976
Party	Candidate	Votes	%
BERJAYA	Suffian Koroh	2,813	68.28
USNO	R. M. Jasni	1,275	30.95
Independent	Anjik	32	0.78
Total valid votes		4,120	100.00
Total rejected ballots		105	
Unreturned ballots		0	
Turnout		4,225	80.25
Registered electors		5,265	
Majority		1,538	37.33
This was a new constituency created
