= Arthur Joseph Kurup =

Malaysian politician, lawyer and economist

Yang Berhormat Dato' Sri Arthur Joseph Kurup SSAP PGDK PMW ASDK JP MP MLA
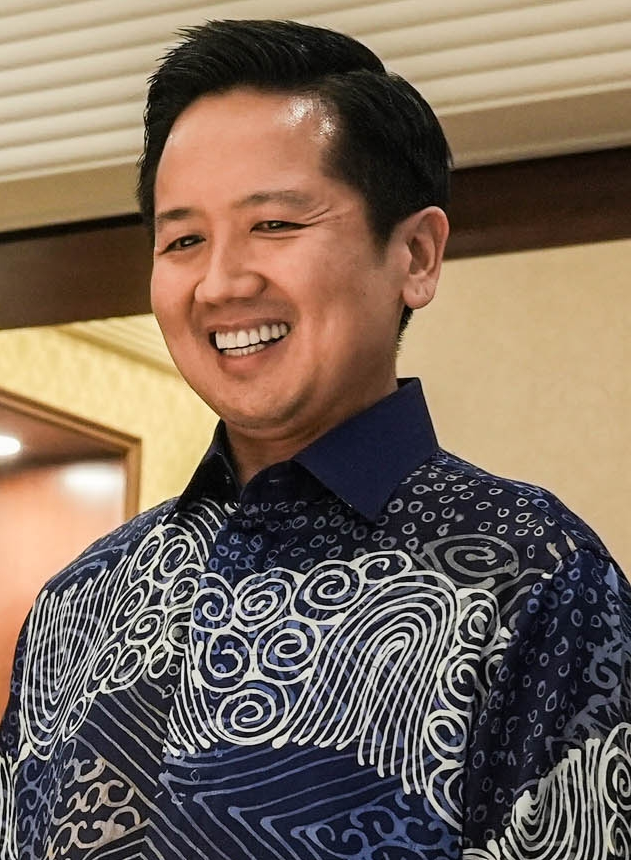
- Kurup in 2024

Minister of Natural Resources and Environmental Sustainability
- Incumbent
- Assumed office 17 December 2025
- Monarch: Ibrahim Iskandar
- Prime Minister: Anwar Ibrahim
- Deputy: Syed Ibrahim Syed Noh
- Preceded by: Nik Nazmi Nik Ahmad; Johari Abdul Ghani (Acting)
- Constituency: Pensiangan

Deputy Minister of Agriculture and Food Security
- In office 12 December 2023 – 17 December 2025
- Monarchs: Abdullah (2023–2024); Ibrahim Iskandar (2024–2025)
- Prime Minister: Anwar Ibrahim
- Minister: Mohamad Sabu
- Preceded by: Chan Foong Hin
- Succeeded by: Chan Foong Hin
- Constituency: Pensiangan

Deputy Minister of Science, Technology and Innovation
- In office 10 December 2022 – 12 December 2023
- Monarch: Abdullah
- Prime Minister: Anwar Ibrahim
- Minister: Chang Lih Kang
- Preceded by: Ahmad Amzad Hashim
- Succeeded by: Yusof Apdal
- Constituency: Pensiangan

Deputy Minister of Works
- In office 30 August 2021 – 24 November 2022
- Monarch: Abdullah
- Prime Minister: Ismail Sabri Yaakob
- Minister: Fadillah Yusof
- Preceded by: Eddin Syazlee Shith
- Succeeded by: Abdul Rahman Mohamad
- Constituency: Pensiangan

Deputy Minister in the Prime Minister's Department (Economy)
- In office 10 March 2020 – 16 August 2021
- Monarch: Abdullah
- Prime Minister: Muhyiddin Yassin
- Minister: Mustapa Mohamed
- Preceded by: Radzi Jidin (Deputy Minister of Economic Affairs)
- Succeeded by: Eddin Syazlee Shith
- Constituency: Pensiangan

Member of the Malaysian Parliament for Pensiangan
- Incumbent
- Assumed office 9 May 2018
- Preceded by: Joseph Kurup (BN–PBRS)
- Majority: 2,314 (2018); 5,412 (2022)

Member of the Sabah State Legislative Assembly for Sook
- Incumbent
- Assumed office 29 November 2025
- Preceded by: Ellron Alfred Angin (STAR)
- Majority: 4,727 (2025)

State Chairman of the Barisan Nasional of Sabah
- Incumbent
- Assumed office 21 January 2026
- Deputy: Jafry Ariffin
- National Chairman: Ahmad Zahid Hamidi
- Preceded by: Bung Moktar Radin

2nd President of the Parti Bersatu Rakyat Sabah
- Incumbent
- Assumed office 7 January 2023
- Deputy: Richard Kastum (since 2024)
- Preceded by: Joseph Kurup

Deputy President of the Parti Bersatu Rakyat Sabah
- In office 1 November 2015 – 7 January 2023
- President: Joseph Kurup
- Preceded by: Ellron Alfred Angin
- Succeeded by: Richard Kastum

Faction represented in Dewan Rakyat
- 2018: Barisan Nasional
- 2018–2020: United Sabah People's Party
- 2020–: Barisan Nasional

Faction represented in Sabah State Legislative Assembly
- 2025–: Barisan Nasional

Personal details
- Born: Arthur Joseph Kurup; 4 August 1981 (age 45) Kota Kinabalu, Sabah, Malaysia
- Citizenship: Malaysia
- Party: United Sabah People's Party (PBRS)
- Other political affiliations: Barisan Nasional (BN) (1994–2018, since 2020); Gabungan Bersatu Sabah (GBS) (2018–2020)
- Spouse: Stella Boklin
- Parent: Joseph Kurup (died 2024)
- Education: Bond University; University of Queensland
- Occupation: Politician
- Profession: Lawyer; Economist
- Arthur Joseph Kurup on Facebook

Arthur Joseph Kurup (born 4 August 1981) is a Malaysian politician, lawyer and economist who has served as the Minister of Natural Resources and Environmental Sustainability in the Unity Government administration under Prime Minister Anwar Ibrahim since December 2025, the Member of Parliament (MP) for Pensiangan since May 2018 and Member of the Sabah State Legislative Assembly (MLA) for Sook since November 2025.

He previously served as the Deputy Minister of Agriculture and Food Security in the Unity Government administration under Prime Minister Anwar and Minister Mohamad Sabu from December 2023 to his promotion in December 2025, Deputy Minister of Science, Technology and Innovation prior to the 2023 cabinet reshuffle under Minister Chang Lih Kang from December 2022 to December 2023, Deputy Minister of Works in the Barisan Nasional (BN) administration under former Prime Minister Ismail Sabri Yaakob and former Minister Fadillah Yusof from August 2021 to the collapse of the BN administration in November 2022 and the Deputy Minister in the Prime Minister's Department in charge of Economic Affairs in the Perikatan Nasional (PN) administration under former Prime Minister Muhyiddin Yassin and former Minister Mustapa Mohamed from March 2020 to the collapse of the PN administration in August 2021.

He is a member of the United Sabah People's Party (PBRS), a component party of the BN coalition. He has also served as the State Chairman of BN of Sabah since January 2026 and the 2nd President of PBRS since January 2023. He is also presently the sole PBRS MP elected in the 2022 General election. Additionally, he is presently the third youngest Cabinet minister in the Anwar Ibrahim cabinet after Minister of Youth and Sports Mohammed Taufiq Johari and Minister of Economy Akmal Nasir at the age of 45 years, 31 days. Prior to the 2025 Malaysian cabinet reshuffle that saw his promotion to a Cabinet minister, he was the only president of a party appointed as a deputy minister.

== Career ==
Arthur previously worked as a Trade and Legal Officer at the World Trade Organization (WTO) in Geneva, Switzerland before returning to Malaysia. He served as a Director of Sabah Housing and Development Town Board.

== Politics ==
He is the eldest son of the 1st and founding President of PBRS Joseph Kurup. He served as the Deputy President of PBRS from November 2015 to his promotion to party presidency in January 2023 and had served as Vice President and Youth Chief of PBRS in the past. In the 2018 general election, his party of United Sabah People's Party (PBRS) fielded him to contest the Pensiangan parliamentary seat to succeed his father and party president, Joseph Kurup. He faced Raymond Ahuar from the People's Justice Party (PKR) and defeated him.

== Election results ==
Parliament of Malaysia
| Year | Constituency | Candidate | Votes | Pct | Opponent(s) | Votes | Pct | Ballots cast | Majority | Turnout |
|---|---|---|---|---|---|---|---|---|---|---|
| 2018 | P182 Pensiangan | Arthur Joseph Kurup (PBRS) | 11,783 | 48.35% | Raymond Ahuar (PKR) | 9,469 | 38.86% | 24,368 | 2,314 | 77.66% |
| 2018 | P182 Pensiangan | Arthur Joseph Kurup (PBRS) | 11,783 | 48.35% | Richard Joe Jimmy (STAR) | 2,839 | 11.65% | 24,368 | 2,314 | 77.66% |
| 2018 | P182 Pensiangan | Arthur Joseph Kurup (PBRS) | 11,783 | 48.35% | Maidin Atak (PCS) | 212 | 0.87% | 24,368 | 2,314 | 77.66% |
| 2018 | P182 Pensiangan | Arthur Joseph Kurup (PBRS) | 11,783 | 48.35% | Engah Sintan (IND) | 65 | 0.27% | 24,368 | 2,314 | 77.66% |
| 2022 | P182 Pensiangan | Arthur Joseph Kurup (PBRS) | 19,623 | 52.88% | Sangkar Rasam (PKR) | 14,211 | 38.29% | 37,110 | 5,412 | 66.66% |
| 2022 | P182 Pensiangan | Arthur Joseph Kurup (PBRS) | 19,623 | 52.88% | Jekerison Kilan (KDM) | 1,640 | 4.42% | 37,110 | 5,412 | 66.66% |
| 2022 | P182 Pensiangan | Arthur Joseph Kurup (PBRS) | 19,623 | 52.88% | Siti Noorhasmahwatty Osman (WARISAN) | 1,512 | 4.07% | 37,110 | 5,412 | 66.66% |
| 2022 | P182 Pensiangan | Arthur Joseph Kurup (PBRS) | 19,623 | 52.88% | Jamani Derimin (PEJUANG) | 124 | 0.33% | 37,110 | 5,412 | 66.66% |

Sabah State Legislative Assembly
| Year | Constituency | Candidate | Votes | Pct | Opponent(s) | Votes | Pct | Ballots cast | Majority | Turnout |
|---|---|---|---|---|---|---|---|---|---|---|
| 2025 | N43 Sook | Arthur Joseph Kurup (PBRS) | 8,307 | 57.90% | Ellron Alfred Angin (GRS) | 3,580 | 24.95% | 14,347 | 4,727 | 70.50% |
| 2025 | N43 Sook | Arthur Joseph Kurup (PBRS) | 8,307 | 57.90% | Ireneus Pagut @ Jreneus Pagut (STAR) | 1,681 | 11.70% | 14,347 | 4,727 | 70.50% |
| 2025 | N43 Sook | Arthur Joseph Kurup (PBRS) | 8,307 | 57.90% | Joseph Peter Tinggi (WARISAN) | 708 | 4.93% | 14,347 | 4,727 | 70.50% |
| 2025 | N43 Sook | Arthur Joseph Kurup (PBRS) | 8,307 | 57.90% | Jurinah Nasir (PIS) | 161 | 1.07% | 14,347 | 4,727 | 70.50% |

== Honours ==
=== Honours of Malaysia ===
- Malaysia
  - Recipient of the 17th Yang di-Pertuan Agong Installation Medal
- Federal Territory (Malaysia)
  - Commander of the Order of the Territorial Crown (PMW) – Datuk (2021)
- Pahang
  - Knight Grand Companion of the Order of Sultan Ahmad Shah of Pahang (SSAP) – Dato' Sri (2025)
- Sabah
  - Commander of the Order of Kinabalu (PGDK) – Datuk (2023)
  - Companion of the Order of Kinabalu (ASDK) (2021)
  - Justice of the Peace (JP) (2015)
