= United Sabah People's Party =

Malaysian political party

- Malay name: Parti Bersatu Rakyat Sabah
- Abbreviation: PBRS
- President: Arthur Joseph Kurup
- Secretary-General: Richard Kastum
- Spokesperson: Rayner Francis Udong
- Deputy President: Richard Kastum
- Youth Leader: Edwin Laimin
- Vice President: Motusin Matius Bowie; Nomrin Rosnie Manain; Vincen Lee; Zhamriee Gilam Rasul; Fung Hon Yi; Jessel CP Yansalang; Zainon Kayum
- Founder: Joseph Kurup
- Founded: 3 March 1994
- Legalised: 11 March 1994
- Split from: United Sabah Party (PBS)
- Headquarters: Blok B, Lot 19, Tingkat Dua, Lorong Singgah Mata 2, Asia City, 88000 Kota Kinabalu, Sabah
- Youth wing: Youth Section
- Women's wing: Women Section
- Ideology: Sabah regionalism; 20-point agreement; Multiracialism; Indigenous rights; Social conservatism; Kadazan-Dusun interests
- Political position: Centre-right
- National affiliation: Barisan Nasional (1994–2018, since 2020) (Note: The party was member of the United Alliance of Sabah (2018–2020) and Gabungan Rakyat Sabah (2020–2022). Through BN it is aligned with Perikatan Nasional (2020–2022), Gabungan Rakyat Sabah (since 2022), and Gabungan Parti Sarawak (since 2020)); National Unity Government (since 2022)
- Colours: Yellow
- Dewan Negara: 0 / 70
- Dewan Rakyat: 1 / 26 (Sabah and Labuan seats)
- Sabah State Legislative Assembly: 1 / 79

Election symbol
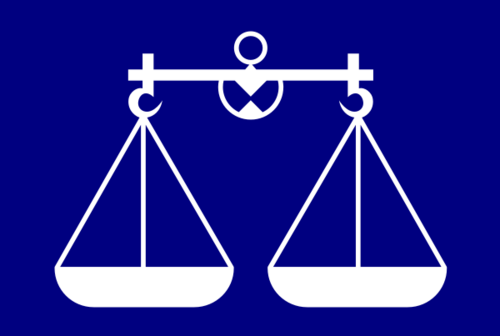

Website
- Facebook PBRS

The United Sabah People's Party (Malay: Parti Bersatu Rakyat Sabah; PBRS) is a Sabah-based political party in Malaysia. The party was founded in 1994 as a splinter of the United Sabah Party (PBS) by Joseph Kurup, leading the party from its foundation to 2023. PBRS had been a component party of Barisan Nasional (BN) since its founding, except for a brief period between 2018 and 2020. Presently, the party is led by the founder's son, Arthur Joseph Kurup.

== History ==
The party was formed on 11 March 1994 by founding president Joseph Kurup who had led disaffected members of the United Sabah Party (PBS). On 10 June 1994, PBRS was officially accepted as one of the component parties in the ruling Barisan Nasional (BN) coalition.

Following the 2018 general election that saw the collapse of the BN ruling coalition, PBRS president Joseph Kurup declared the party's intention to quit BN as a component. The decision was announced to the public after receiving approval from the party's Supreme Council on 12 May 2018. In the aftermath, PBRS applied to become a component of the new ruling Pakatan Harapan (PH) coalition under the pretext of ensuring the fulfillment of its election promises. However, the application was ignored, followed by a statement from then Sabah PH chief Christina Liew that PBRS had a 'very slim chance' to join the coalition. Faced with rejection, PBRS decided to remain with BN before forming a new coalition with other Sabah-based parties known as the United Alliance of Sabah (Gabungan Bersatu Sabah, GBS).

In the wake of the 2020–2022 Malaysian political crisis that resulted in the collapse of the PH federal government, PBRS attended the Barisan Nasional Supreme Council meeting on 12 May 2020 after a 2-year lapse, deciding to rejoin the coalition whose components at the time were left with UMNO, MCA and MIC. Barisan Nasional had decided to declare support for the new Perikatan Nasional (PN) federal government led by Prime Minister Muhyiddin Yassin. PBRS Deputy President and sole party MP, Arthur Joseph Kurup, was appointed as the Deputy Minister in the Prime Minister's Department for Economic Affairs in the BN-supported Muhyiddin cabinet. BN secretary-general Annuar Musa declared that, as the coalition Supreme Council meeting was attended by PBRS president Joseph Kurup himself, it implicates the return of PBRS as a BN component party. On 9 January 2021, Arthur Joseph Kurup signed a memorandum of understanding (MoU) to set-up Gabungan Rakyat Sabah (GRS), a Sabah-based political alliance which contested and won the 2020 Sabah state election, forming the state government under Hajiji Noor. On 7 January 2023, Joseph Kurup stepped down as the 1st PBRS president and became the Honorary Chairman of PBRS after helming the party for 29 years from its formation in 1994 to 2023. Party deputy president and his son, Arthur Joseph Kurup, succeeded him as the 2nd party president.

== Leadership ==
=== President ===
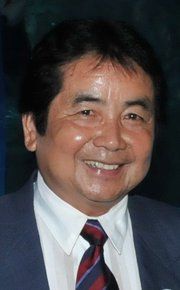
1st: Joseph Kurup, founding President (1994–2023)

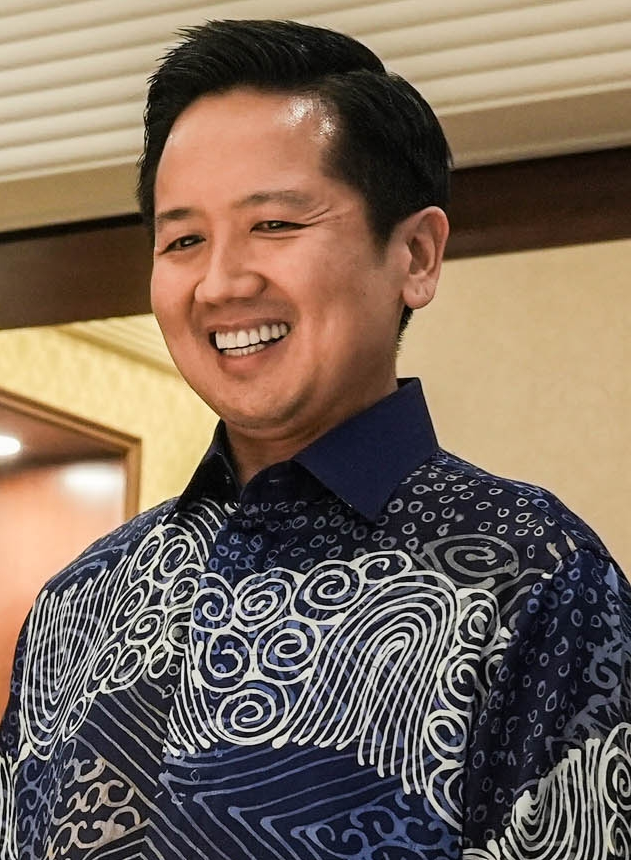
2nd: Arthur Joseph Kurup, the second President (since 2023)

No.	Name	Term of office	
1	Joseph Kurup	3 March 1994	7 January 2023
2	Arthur Joseph Kurup	7 January 2023	Incumbent

== Elected representatives ==
=== Dewan Rakyat (House of Representatives) ===
==== Members of Parliament of the 15th Malaysian Parliament ====
PBRS currently has only one member in the House of Representatives.

State	No.	Parliament Constituency	Member	Party
Sabah	P182	Pensiangan	Arthur Joseph Kurup	PBRS
Total	Sabah (1)			

=== Dewan Undangan Negeri (State Legislative Assembly) ===
==== Malaysian State Assembly Representatives ====
Sabah State Legislative Assembly

1 / 79

State	No.	Federal Constituency	No.	State Constituency	Member	Party
Sabah	P182	Pensiangan	N45	Sook	Arthur Joseph Kurup	PBRS
Total	Sabah (1)					

== Government offices ==
=== Ministerial posts ===
Portfolio	Office Bearer	Constituency
Minister of Natural Resources and Environmental Sustainability	Arthur Joseph Kurup	Pensiangan

=== State government ===
- Sabah (1994–1999, 2004–2018, 2025–present)

Note: bold as Premier/Chief Minister, italic as junior partner

== Election results ==
=== General election results ===
Election	Total seats won	Seats contested	Total votes	Voting Percentage	Outcome of election	Election leader
1995	0 / 192	1			; No representation in Parliament (Barisan Nasional)	Joseph Kurup
1999	0 / 193	1			; No representation in Parliament (Barisan Nasional)	Joseph Kurup
2004	1 / 219	1	5,880	0.08%	▲1 seat; Governing coalition (Barisan Nasional)	Joseph Kurup
2008	1 / 222	1	0	0,00%	; Governing coalition (Barisan Nasional)	Joseph Kurup
2013	1 / 222	1	9,467	0.09%	; Governing coalition (Barisan Nasional)	Joseph Kurup
2018	1 / 222	1	11,783	0.10%	; Opposition coalition, later Governing coalition (Barisan Nasional)	Arthur Joseph Kurup
2022	1 / 222	2 (Pensiangan-Barisan Nasional; Ranau-PBRS)	23,877	0.15%	; Governing coalition (Barisan Nasional)	Arthur Joseph Kurup

=== State election results ===
Sabah State Legislative Assembly
Election	Votes		Seats			Position (Note: As part of electoral coalition.)	Status
Election	Count	%	Result	Won / contested	+/–	Position	Status
1999	7,526	1.5	0 / 48	0 / 2	Steady	▲1st (Barisan Nasional)	BN
2004	3,973	0.9	1 / 60	1 / 1	▲1	1st (Barisan Nasional)	BN
2008	5,496	1.0	1 / 60	1 / 1	Steady	1st (Barisan Nasional)	BN
2013	7,223	0.9	1 / 60	1 / 1	Steady	1st (Barisan Nasional)	BN
2018	8,042	1.0	1 / 60	1 / 1	Steady	1st (Barisan Nasional)	BN–STAR (2018)
2018	8,042	1.0	1 / 60	1 / 1	Steady	1st (Barisan Nasional)	No seats (2018–2020) (Note: Defected to other parties.)
2020	9,687	1.3	0 / 73	0 / 4	▼1	1st (Gabungan Rakyat Sabah)	No seats
2025	10,184	0.9	1 / 73	1 / 2	▲1	▼3rd (Barisan Nasional)	GRS–PH–BN
