= Keningau (federal constituency) =

Federal constituency of Sabah, Malaysia

Keningau (P180)
Sabah constituency

Federal constituency
- Legislature: Dewan Rakyat
- MP: Jeffrey Kitingan; Homeland Solidarity Party
- Constituency created: 1974
- First contested: 1974
- Last contested: 2022

Demographics
- Population (2020): 129,882
- Electors (2025): 93,153
- Area (km²): 2,231
- Pop. density (per km²): 58.2

Keningau is a federal constituency in Interior Division (Keningau District and Tambunan District), Sabah, Malaysia, that has been represented in the Dewan Rakyat since 1974.

The federal constituency was created in the 1974 redistribution and is mandated to return a single member to the Dewan Rakyat under the first past the post voting system.

== Demographics ==
https://ge15.orientaldaily.com.my/seats/sabah/p

Ethnic breakdown of Keningau's electorate as of 2022
1. Sabah Bumiputera (72.9%)
2. Malay-Muslim Bumiputera (12.6%)
3. Chinese (11.9%)
4. Other ethnicities (2.60%)

As of 2020, Keningau has a population of 129,882 people.

Age breakdown of Keningau's electorate as of 2022
1. 18-20 (7.87%)
2. 21-29 (26.5%)
3. 30-39 (24.8%)
4. 40-49 (15.8%)
5. 50-59 (12.4%)
6. 60-69 (8.00%)
7. 70-79 (2.83%)
8. 80-89 (1.13%)
9. above 90 (0.60%)
Gender breakdown of Keningau's electorate as of 2022
1. Male (50.4%)
2. Female (49.6%)

== History ==
=== Polling districts ===
According to the gazette issued on 21 November 2025, the Keningau constituency has a total of 37 polling districts.

State constituency	Polling Districts	Code	Location
Tambunan (N39)	Kirokot	180/39/01	SK Kirokot
Tambunan (N39)	Patau	180/39/02	SK Patau
Tambunan (N39)	Kinabaan	180/39/03	SMK Tambunan
Tambunan (N39)	Sunsuron	180/39/04	SK Sunsuron
Tambunan (N39)	Timbou	180/39/05	SK Timbou
Tambunan (N39)	Toboh	180/39/06	SK St David Toboh
Tambunan (N39)	Kaingaran	180/39/07	SK Kaingaran
Tambunan (N39)	Tambunan Bandar	180/39/08	SK St Theresa; SMA Negeri Pekan Tambunan
Tambunan (N39)	Lubong	180/39/09	SMK Nambayan
Tambunan (N39)	Nambayan	180/39/10	SK Monsok Tengah
Tambunan (N39)	Kuala Monsok	180/39/11	SK Lotong
Tambunan (N39)	Garas	180/39/12	SK Garas
Tambunan (N39)	Tiong	180/39/13	SK Tiong Wido
Tambunan (N39)	Namadan	180/39/14	SK Kuala Namadan Tambunan
Tambunan (N39)	Monsorulong	180/39/15	SK Kuala Monsok
Tambunan (N39)	Rompon	180/39/16	SK Rompon
Bingkor (N40)	Ranggon	180/40/01	SA Rakyat Al-Huda
Bingkor (N40)	Apin-Apin	180/40/02	SK Apin-Apin; SK St James Apin-Apin
Bingkor (N40)	Marampong	180/40/03	SK Merampong; SK Liau
Bingkor (N40)	Bunga Raya	180/40/04	SK Bunga Raya
Bingkor (N40)	Kukuangoh	180/40/05	SK Kampong Baru
Bingkor (N40)	Tuntumulod	180/40/06	SK Bunsit
Bingkor (N40)	Bingkor	180/40/07	SK Bingkor
Bingkor (N40)	Baginda	180/40/08	SK Binaong
Bingkor (N40)	Tuarid Taud	180/40/09	SK Tuarid Taud
Bingkor (N40)	Keningau Station	180/40/10	SMK Keningau II
Bingkor (N40)	Keningau Bandar	180/40/11	SMK St. Francis Xavier
Liawan (N41)	Luagan	180/41/01	SK Luagan
Liawan (N41)	Liawan	180/41/02	SK Kg Keningau
Liawan (N41)	Patikang Laut	180/41/03	SK Bulu Silou
Liawan (N41)	Sinagang	180/41/04	SK Senagang
Liawan (N41)	Meninpir	180/41/05	SJK (C) Yuk Kong
Liawan (N41)	Bayangan	180/41/06	SA Negeri Bayangan Keningau
Liawan (N41)	Mesjid	180/41/07	SMK Gunsanad
Liawan (N41)	Limbawan	180/41/08	SK Pekan Keningau
Liawan (N41)	Motou	180/41/09	Tadika Sabah Chinese Association Keningau
Liawan (N41)	Banjar	180/41/10	SK Banjar

=== Representation history ===
Members of Parliament for Keningau
Parliament	No	Years	Member	Party	Vote Share
Constituency created from Sabah Dalam and Kinabatangan
4th	P127	1974-1977	Stephen Robert Evans	BN (USNO)	Uncontested
4th	P127	1977-1978	Harris Salleh (حارث محمّد صالح)	BN (BERJAYA)	8,410; 77.43%
5th	P127	1978-1982	Stephen Robert Evans	BN (USNO)	8,612; 82.89%
6th	P127	1982-1986	Ahmad Shah Hussein Tambakau (احمد شاه حسين تمباكاو)	BN (BERJAYA)	8,552; 72.27%
7th	P142	1986-1990	Joseph Pairin Kitingan	BN (PBS)	Uncontested
8th	P142	1990-1995	Joseph Pairin Kitingan	GR (PBS)	Uncontested
9th	P157	1995–1999	Joseph Pairin Kitingan	GR (PBS)	17,510; 66.71%
10th	P157	1999-2004	Joseph Pairin Kitingan	PBS	12,783; 50.49%
11th	P180	2004-2008	Joseph Pairin Kitingan	BN (PBS)	Uncontested
12th	P180	2008–2013	Joseph Pairin Kitingan	BN (PBS)	14,598; 57.27%
13th	P180	2013–2018	Joseph Pairin Kitingan	BN (PBS)	15,818; 44.50%
14th	P180	2018–2020	Jeffrey Kitingan	STAR	13,286; 33.09%
14th	P180	2020–2022	Jeffrey Kitingan	GRS (STAR)	13,286; 33.09%
15th	P180	2022–2025	Jeffrey Kitingan	GRS (STAR)	23,155; 42.20%
15th	P180	2025–present	Jeffrey Kitingan	STAR	23,155; 42.20%

=== State constituency ===
Parliamentary constituency	State constituency					
Parliamentary constituency	1967–1974	1974–1985	1985–1995	1995–2004	2004–2020	2020–present
Keningau		Bingkor				
Keningau					Liawan	
Keningau		Pensiangan		Pensiangan		
Keningau		Sook				
Keningau			Tambunan			

=== Historical boundaries ===
State Constituency	Area				
State Constituency	1974	1984	1994	2003	2019
Bingkor	Apin-Apin; Bingkor; Kanuran; Liawan; Tudan		Bandukan; Bingkor; Kukangoh; Minawo; Tulid	Apin-Apin; Bingkor; Kukangoh; Marampong; Tuntumulod	Apin-Apin; Bingkor; Keningau; Marampong; Tuntumulod
Liawan				Bayangan; Liawan; Keningau; Patingkang Laut; Sinagang	Bayangan; Liawan; Luagan; Patingkang Laut; Sinagang
Pensiangan	Nabawan; Tibow; Pensiangan; Sapulut; Sibangali		Nabawan; Sapalut; Pensiangan; Simatuoh; Sook		
Sook	Ansip; Marapok; Sook; Tiulon; Tulid				
Tambunan		Kuala Monsok; Kirokot; Sunsuron; Rompok; Tambunan			

=== Current state assembly members ===
No.	State Constituency	Member	Coalition (Party)
N39	Tambunan	Jeffrey Gapari Kitingan	STAR
N40	Bingkor	Mohd Ishak Ayub	STAR
N41	Liawan	Nik Mohd Nadzri Nik Zawawi	BN (UMNO)

=== Local governments & postcodes ===
No.	State Constituency	Local Government	Postcode
N39	Tambunan	Tambunan District Council	89000 Keningau; 89650 Tambunan
N40	Bingkor	Keningau District Council	89000 Keningau; 89650 Tambunan
N41	Liawan	Keningau District Council	89000 Keningau; 89650 Tambunan

== Election results ==
Malaysian general election, 2022
Party	Candidate	Votes	%	∆%
GRS	Jeffrey Gapari Kitingan @ Geoffrey Kitingan	23,155	42.20	▲42.20
PH	Grelydia Gillod	15,099	27.52	▲27.52
KDM	Jake Nointin	9,598	17.49	▲17.49
Heritage	Rasinin Kautis	7,020	12.79	▼18.95
Total valid votes		54,872	100.00	
Total rejected ballots		424		
Unreturned ballots		246		
Turnout		55,542	62.65	▼16.37
Registered electors		87,588		
Majority		8,056	14.68	▲14.57
GRS hold		Swing		
Source(s) https://lom.agc.gov.my/ilims/upload/portal/akta/outputp/1753262/PUB619_2022.pdf

Malaysian general election, 2018
Party	Candidate	Votes	%	∆%
Homeland Solidarity Party	Jeffrey Gapari Kitingan @ Geoffrey Kitingan	13,286	33.09	▼0.39
Sabah Heritage Party	Jikulin Nointin @ Jake Anastasius	13,241	32.98	▲32.98
BN	Daniel Kinsik	12,742	31.74	▼12.16
Love Sabah Party	Jius Awang	433	1.08	▲1.08
Independent	Maimin Rijan	248	0.62	▲0.62
Independent	Justin Guka	199	0.50	▲0.50
Total valid votes		40,149	100.00	
Total rejected ballots		522		
Unreturned ballots		242		
Turnout		40,913	79.02	▼3.71
Registered electors		51,177		
Majority		45	0.11	▼10.91
Homeland Solidarity Party gain from BN		Swing		?
Source(s) "His Majesty's Government Gazette - Notice of Contested Election, Parliament for the State of Sabah [P.U. (B) 246/2018]" (PDF). Attorney General's Chambers of Malaysia. 3 May 2018. "Federal Government Gazette - Results of Contested Election and Statements of the Poll after the Official Addition of Votes, Parliamentary Constituencies for the State of Sabah [P.U. (B) 320/2018]" (PDF). Attorney General's Chambers of Malaysia. 28 May 2018. Archived from the original (PDF) on 2019-12-29.

Malaysian general election, 2013
Party	Candidate	Votes	%	∆%
BN	Joseph Pairin Kitingan	15,818	44.50	▼12.77
STAR	Jeffrey Gapari Kitingan @ Geoffrey Kitingan	11,900	33.48	▲33.48
PKR	Stephen Sandor	7,825	22.02	▼18.51
Total valid votes		35,543	100.00	
Total rejected ballots		555		
Unreturned ballots		46		
Turnout		36,144	82.73	▲54.77
Registered electors		43,691		
Majority		3,918	11.02	▼5.72
BN hold		Swing		
Source(s) "Federal Government Gazette - Notice of Contested Election, Parliament for the State of Sabah [P.U. (B) 183/2013]" (PDF). Attorney General's Chambers of Malaysia. 26 April 2013. Archived from the original (PDF) on 2018-09-30. "Federal Government Gazette - Results of Contested Election and Statements of the Poll after the Official Addition of Votes, Parliamentary Constituencies for the State of Sabah [P.U. (B) 224/2013]" (PDF). Attorney General's Chambers of Malaysia. 22 May 2013.

Malaysian general election, 2008
Party	Candidate	Votes	%	∆%
BN	Joseph Pairin Kitingan	14,598	57.27	
PKR	Jeffrey Gapari Kitingan @ Geoffrey Kitingan	10,334	40.53	
DAP	Peter Kodou @ Peter Anthony Kodou	560	2.20	
Total valid votes		25,492	100.00	
Total rejected ballots		464		
Unreturned ballots		0		
Turnout		25,956	72.96	
Registered electors		35,578		
Majority		4,264	16.74	
BN hold		Swing		

Malaysian general election, 2004
Party	Candidate	Votes	%	∆%
On the nomination day, Joseph Pairin Kitingan won uncontested.
BN	Joseph Pairin Kitingan			
Total valid votes			100.00	
Total rejected ballots				
Unreturned ballots				
Turnout				
Registered electors		34,510		
Majority				
BN gain from PBS		Swing		?

Malaysian general election, 1999
Party	Candidate	Votes	%	∆%
PBS	Joseph Pairin Kitingan	12,783	50.49	▼16.22
BN	Joseph Kurup	12,533	49.51	▲16.22
Total valid votes		25,316	100.00	
Total rejected ballots		283		
Unreturned ballots		3		
Turnout		25,602	64.05	▼9.06
Registered electors		39,971		
Majority		250	0.98	▼32.44
PBS hold		Swing		

Malaysian general election, 1995
Party	Candidate	Votes	%	∆%
PBS	Joseph Pairin Kitingan	17,510	66.71	
BN	Ellron Alfred Angin	8,736	33.29	
Total valid votes		26,246	100.00	
Total rejected ballots		353		
Unreturned ballots		43		
Turnout		26,642	73.11	
Registered electors		22,612		
Majority		8,774	33.42	
PBS hold		Swing		

Malaysian general election, 1990
Party	Candidate	Votes	%	∆%
On the nomination day, Joseph Pairin Kitingan won uncontested.
PBS	Joseph Pairin Kitingan			
Total valid votes			100.00	
Total rejected ballots				
Unreturned ballots				
Turnout				
Registered electors		19,617		
Majority				
PBS gain from BN		Swing		?

Malaysian general election, 1986
Party	Candidate	Votes	%	∆%
On the nomination day, Joseph Pairin Kitingan won uncontested.
BN	Joseph Pairin Kitingan			
Total valid votes			100.00	
Total rejected ballots				
Unreturned ballots				
Turnout				
Registered electors		15,595		
Majority				
BN hold		Swing		

Malaysian general election, 1982
Party	Candidate	Votes	%	∆%
BN	Ahmad Shah Hussein Tambakau	8,552	72.27	▼10.62
PASOK	Uling Anggan	2,164	18.29	▲18.29
Independent	Allin Jaafar	1,117	9.44	▲9.44
Total valid votes		11,833	100.00	
Total rejected ballots		539		
Unreturned ballots		0		
Turnout		12,372	62.63	▲0.58
Registered electors		19,755		
Majority		6,388	53.98	▼11.80
BN hold		Swing		

Malaysian general election, 1978
Party	Candidate	Votes	%	∆%
BN	Stephen Robert Evans	8,612	82.89	▲5.46
PUSAKA	Juri Gahun @ Cayus	1,778	17.11	▲17.11
Total valid votes		10,390	100.00	
Total rejected ballots		288		
Unreturned ballots		0		
Turnout		10,678	62.05	
Registered electors		17,210		
Majority		6,834	65.78	▲10.92
BN hold		Swing		

Malaysian general by-election, 26–30 January 1977 Upon the resignation of incumbent, Stephen Robert Evans
Party	Candidate	Votes	%	∆%
BN	Harris Salleh	8,410	77.43	
Independent	Bittie Basingau	2,451	22.57	
Total valid votes		10,861	100.00	
Total rejected ballots				
Unreturned ballots				
Turnout				
Registered electors				
Majority		5,959	54.86	
BN hold		Swing		

Malaysian general election, 1974
Party	Candidate	Votes	%
On the nomination day, Stephen Robert Evans won uncontested.
BN	Stephen Robert Evans		
Total valid votes			100.00
Total rejected ballots			
Unreturned ballots			
Turnout			
Registered electors		13,289	
Majority			
This was a new constituency created.
Source(s) https://github.com/TindakMalaysia/HISTORICAL-ELECTION-RESULTS/blob/main/1974-ELECTION-RESULTS/MALAYSIA_1974_PARLIAMENT_RESULTS.csv
