= 2004 Sabah state election =

State election in Sabah, Malaysia

- 21 March 2004

All 60 seats in the Sabah State Legislative Assembly 31 seats needed for a majority
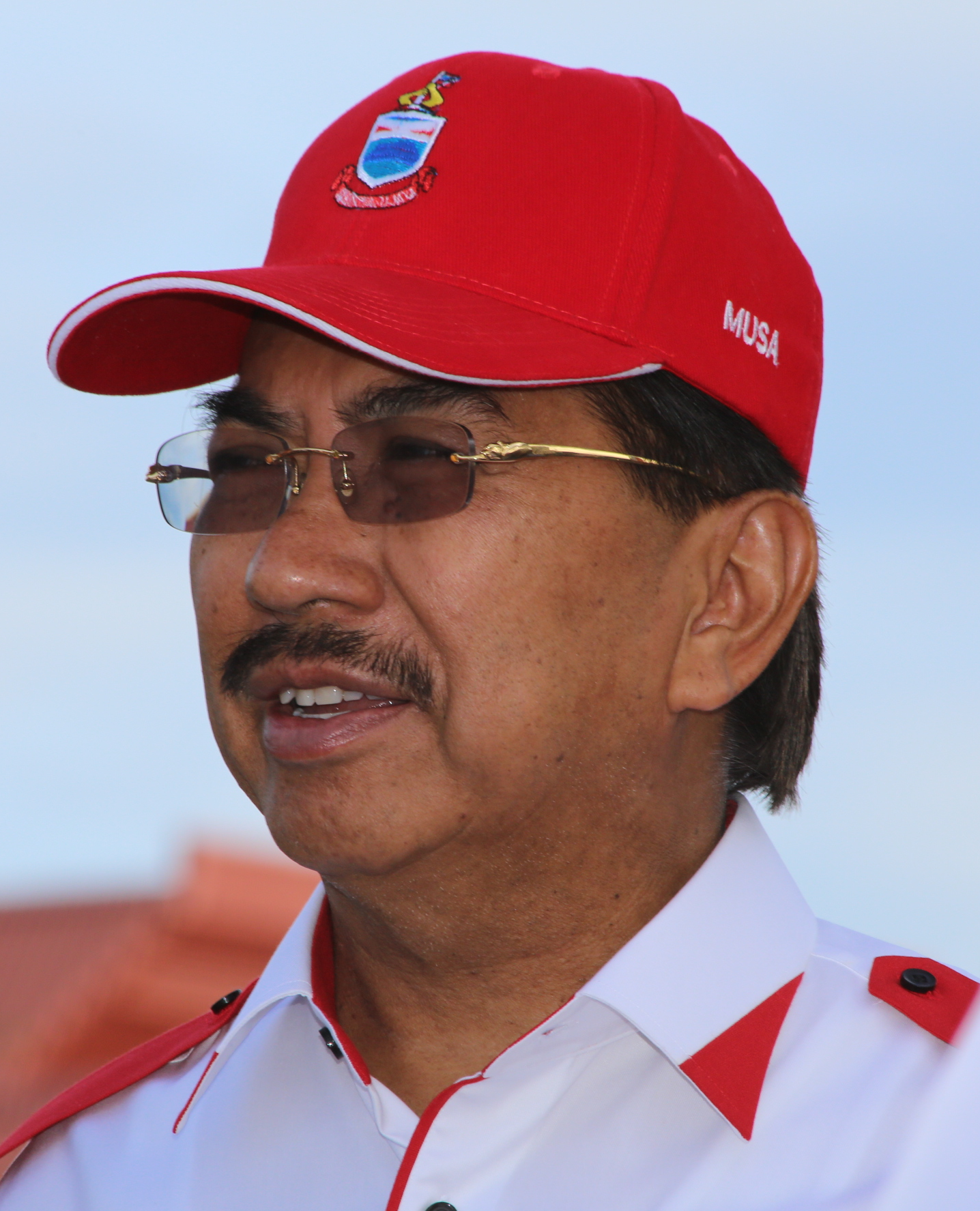

	Majority party	Minority party	Third party
Leader	Musa Aman	John@Johan Ghani	Abd Kahar Abd Rahman
Party	UMNO	Independent	keADILan
Alliance	Barisan Nasional		Barisan Alternatif
Leader since	2003		Unknown
Leader's seat	Sungai Sibuga	Kuala Penyu	Tandek (defeated)
Last election	31		New party
Seats won	59	1	0
Seat change	▲28	▲1	Steady
	Fourth party
Leader	Hiew King Chew
Party	Democratic Action Party
Leader since	Unknown
Leader's seat	Inanam (defeated)
Last election	Did not contest
Seats won	0
Seat change	Steady
Chief Minister before election
Musa Aman
BN-UMNO
Elected Chief Minister
Musa Aman
BN-UMNO

The 2004 Sabah state election was held on Sunday, 21 March 2004, concurrently with the 2004 Malaysian general election. This election featured 12 new state seats increasing the total seats from 48 to 60. There was also an additional three parliament seats in Sabah following the 2003 delineation of electoral boundaries. The Barisan Nasional (BN) coalition comprehensively won this election after the only major opposition party in Sabah, Parti Bersatu Sabah (PBS) re-joined the BN coalition in 2002.

== Results ==
Barisan Nasional won 59 out of 60 state seats. Out of the 59 seats won, 8 seats was won uncontested. One state seat was won by independent candidate Johan Ghani in Kuala Penyu.

BN also won 24 out of 25 parliamentary seats in Sabah, where 9 seats was won uncontested. One parliamentary seat was won by independent candidate Chong Hon Ming in Sandakan.

Party or alliance		Seats	+/–
Barisan Nasional (BN)	United Malays National Organisation (UMNO)	32	+8
Barisan Nasional (BN)	United Sabah Party (PBS)	13	-4
Barisan Nasional (BN)	United Pasokmomogun Kadazandusun Murut Organisation (UPKO)	5	New
Barisan Nasional (BN)	Sabah Progressive Party (SAPP)	4	+1
Barisan Nasional (BN)	Liberal Democratic Party (LDP)	3	+1
Barisan Nasional (BN)	Malaysian Chinese Association (MCA)	1	+1
Barisan Nasional (BN)	Parti Bersatu Rakyat Sabah (PBRS)	1	+1
Barisan Nasional (BN)	Total	59	+8
Barisan Alternatif (BA)	Pan-Malaysian Islamic Party (PAS)	0	0
Barisan Alternatif (BA)	Parti Keadilan Nasional (keADILan)	0	New
Democratic Action Party (DAP)		0	0
United Democratic Sabah People's Power Party (SETIA)		0	0
Federated Sabah People's Front (BERSEKUTU)		0	0
United Pasok Nunukragang National Organisation (PASOK)		0	0
Independents		1	+1
Total		60	+12
