= 1985 Sabah state election =

State election in Sabah, Malaysia

- 20–21 April 1985

All 48 seats in the Sabah State Legislative Assembly 25 seats needed for a majority
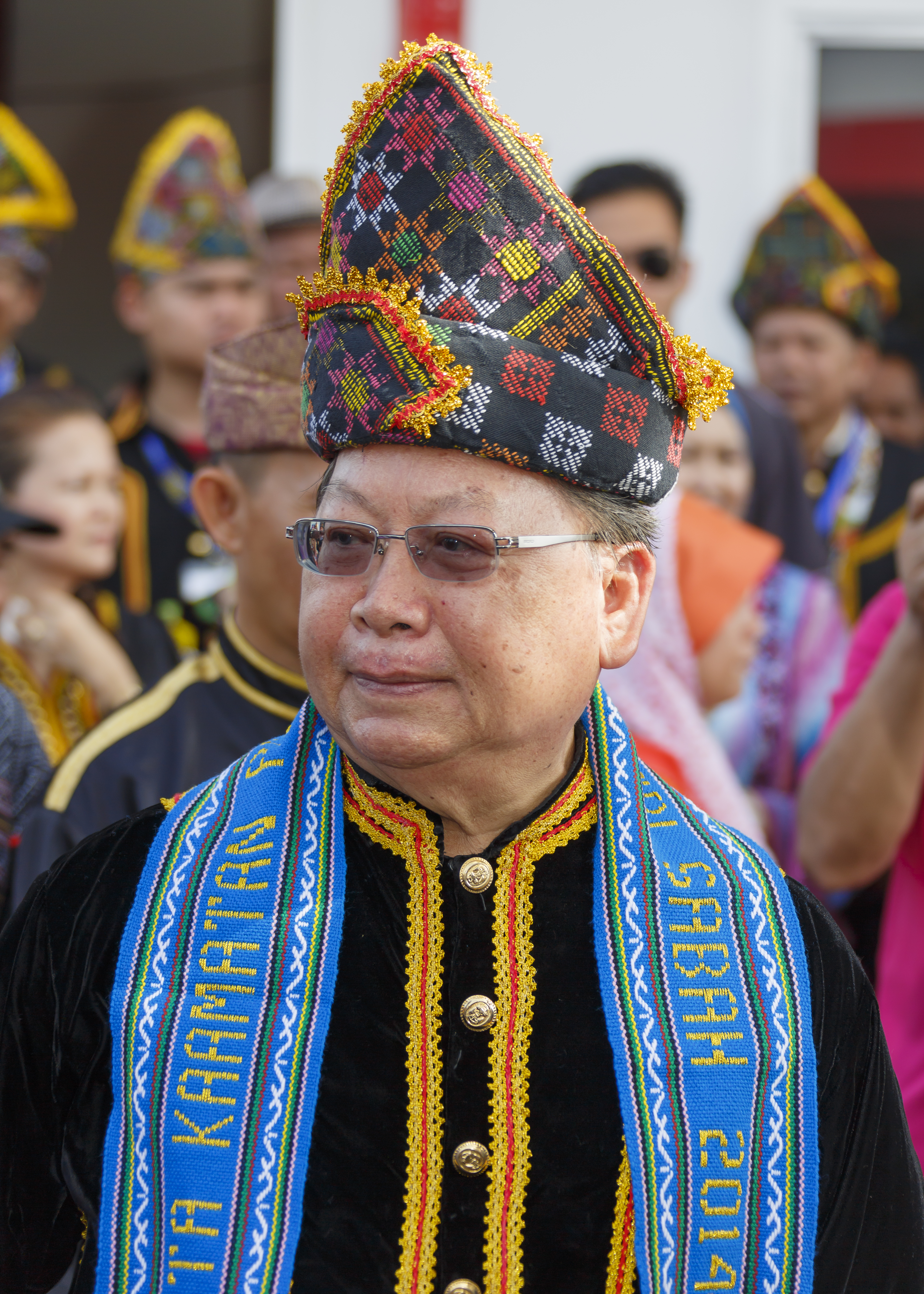

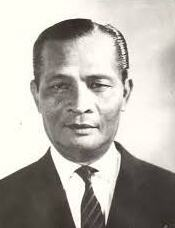

	Majority party	Minority party	Third party
Leader	Joseph Pairin Kitingan	Mustapha Harun	Harris Salleh
Party	PBS	USNO	BERJAYA
Alliance			Barisan Nasional
Leader since	1984	1981	1976
Leader's seat	Tambunan	Usukan	Tenom (lost)
Last election	–	3 seats	44 seats
Seats won	25	16	7
Seat change	New	▲13	▼37
Popular vote	101,908	71,457	84,194
Percentage	37.30%	26.15%	30.81%
Chief Minister before election
Harris Salleh
Barisan Nasional, (BERJAYA)
Elected Chief Minister
Joseph Pairin Kitingan
PBS

The 1985 Sabah state election was held between Saturday, 20 April and Sunday, 21 April 1985. This was the fifth state election to take place. Parti Bersatu Sabah won 25 out 48 seats contested, thus forming government with its president Joseph Pairin Kitingan being sworn in as Chief Minister. This election is a milestone in Sabah political history as it marked the first time that a party not part of the nation's ruling coalition Barisan Nasional (BN) formed government. PBS took control of the state from the previous ruling government under Parti Berjaya—a partner of BN, which has been in power since 1976.

== Results ==
Party	Votes	%	Seats	+/–
United Sabah Party	100,486	36.44	25	New
Sabah People's United Front	84,194	30.53	6	–38
United Sabah National Organisation	74,050	26.85	16	+13
United Pasok Nunukragang National Organisation	5,988	2.17	1	+1
Sabah United Native People's Party	3,734	1.35	0	New
United Sabah People's Action Party	3,088	1.12	0	New
Democratic Action Party	3,115	1.13	0	0
Independents	1,140	0.41	0	0
Total	275,795	100.00	48	0
Valid votes	275,795	98.25		
Invalid/blank votes	4,909	1.75		
Total votes	280,704	100.00		
Registered voters/turnout	379,247	74.02		
Source: Yusoff Tindak Malaysia Github

== Aftermath ==
Pairin, himself a former member of Party Berjaya, formed PBS barely 47 days before the elections. Opponents of PBS, namely, Harris Salleh of Berjaya, and Tun Mustapha of USNO were dissatisfied with the result. Tun Mustapha then sought to get sworn in as Chief Minister illegally, and this resulted in a court battle which ended in favour of Pairin.

The election resulted in riots around Sabah between March and May 1986. Bombings occurred in Kota Kinabalu, and arson in other towns. The rioters were trying to bring down Pairin from being the head of the state government.

In 1986 itself, another election was announced following defections by PBS assemblymen to USNO. PBS won again, this time with a two-thirds majority. PBS joined the Barisan Nasional coalition after this election, but later left the coalition in 1990.
