= Tanjong Kapor =

State constituency in Malaysia

Tanjong Kapor (N04)
Sabah constituency

State constituency
- Legislature: Sabah State Legislative Assembly
MLA
Ben Chong Chen Bin
GRS
- Constituency created: 2003
- First contested: 2004
- Last contested: 2025

Demographics
- Electors (2025): 34,001

Tanjong Kapor is a state constituency in Sabah, Malaysia, that is represented in the Sabah State Legislative Assembly.

== Demographics ==
As of 2020, Tanjong Kapor has a population of 45,362 people.

Ethnic breakdown of Tanjong Kapor's electorate as of 2025
1. Muslim Bumiputera (60.0%)
2. Non-Muslim Bumiputera (28.0%)
3. Chinese (10.0%)
4. Other ethnicities (2.00%)

== History ==
=== Polling districts ===
According to the gazette issued on 31 October 2022, the Tanjung Kapor constituency has a total of 15 polling districts.

State constituency	Polling Districts	Code	Location
Tanjung Kapor（N04）	Tiga Papan	167/04/01	SK Tiga Papan Kudat
Tanjung Kapor（N04）	Suangpai	167/04/02	SK Suangpai
Tanjung Kapor（N04）	Pengaraban	167/04/03	SK Tun Datu Hj Mustapha
Tanjung Kapor（N04）	Tanjung Kapor	167/04/04	SMK Abdul Rahim
Tanjung Kapor（N04）	Pakka	167/04/05	SK St. Peter Kudat
Tanjung Kapor（N04）	Bangau	167/04/06	SK Bangau Kudat
Tanjung Kapor（N04）	Tamalang	167/04/07	SJK (C) Our Lady Immaculate Kudat
Tanjung Kapor（N04）	Dampirit	167/04/08	SK Dampirit
Tanjung Kapor（N04）	Kudat Bandar	167/04/09	SMK Kudat
Tanjung Kapor（N04）	Milau	167/04/10	SK Nangka Kudat
Tanjung Kapor（N04）	Landong Ayang	167/04/11	SMJK Lok Yuk Kudat
Tanjung Kapor（N04）	Loro	167/04/12	SJK (C) Sacred Heart Tajau Kudat
Tanjung Kapor（N04）	Tajau	167/04/13	SJK (C) Lok Yuk Pinangsoo Kudat
Tanjung Kapor（N04）	Limau-Limauan	167/04/14	SK Limau-Limauan
Tanjung Kapor（N04）	Pantai Bahagia	167/04/15	SMK Kudat II

=== Representation history ===
Members of the Legislative Assembly for Tanjong Kapor
Assembly	No	Years	Member	Party
Constituency renamed from Kudat
12th	N02	2004–2008	Chong Kah Kiat (章家杰)	BN (LDP)
13th	N02	2008–2013	Teo Chee Kang (张志刚)	BN (LDP)
14th	N02	2013–2018	Teo Chee Kang (张志刚)	BN (LDP)
15th	N02	2018–2020	Ben Chong Chen Bin (张振彬)	WARISAN
16th	N04	2020–2023	Ben Chong Chen Bin (张振彬)	WARISAN
16th	N04	2023	Ben Chong Chen Bin (张振彬)	Independent
16th	N04	2023–2025	Ben Chong Chen Bin (张振彬)	GRS (GAGASAN)
17th	N04	2025–present	Ben Chong Chen Bin (张振彬)	GRS (GAGASAN)

== Election results ==
Sabah state election, 2025: Tanjong Kapor
Party	Candidate	Votes	%	∆%
GRS	Ben Chong Chen Bin	6,171	30.19	▲30.19
Independent	Verdon Bahanda	5,812	28.43	▲28.43
Heritage	Terence Au Soon Fui	4,737	23.17	▼25.30
BN	Kelvin Lee Sip Kim	1,455	7.12	▲7.12
PN	Muhammad Affan Jumahat	1,262	6.17	▼29.67
Homeland Solidarity Party	Shawn Davey Robert Lee	434	2.12	▲2.12
Sabah Dream Party	Jetol Dangin	184	0.90	▲0.90
PBK	Abdul Halim Yussof	166	0.81	▲0.81
Independent	Abdul Rahim Madtaip	105	0.51	▲0.51
Sabah Native Co-operation Party	Awang Karim Abdul Kadir	63	0.31	▲0.31
Sabah Peace Party	Boony Berman	52	0.25	▲0.25
Total valid votes		20,441		
Total rejected ballots		414		
Unreturned ballots		40		
Turnout		20,895	61.45	▼1.27
Registered electors		34,001		
Majority		359	1.76	▼10.87
GRS gain from Heritage		Swing		?
Source(s) "RESULTS OF CONTESTED ELECTION AND STATEMENTS OF THE POLL AFTER THE OFFICIAL ADDITION OF VOTES" (PDF).

Sabah state election, 2020: Tanjong Kapor
Party	Candidate	Votes	%	∆%
Sabah Heritage Party	Ben Chong Chen Bin	7,206	48.47	▼4.45
PN	Norlizah Gurahman	5,327	35.84	▲35.84
LDP	Chin Kee Yong	1,492	10.04	▼25.52
Love Sabah Party	Shawn Davey Robert Lee	221	1.49	▼1.30
USNO (Baru)	Awang Karim Abdul Kadir	211	1.42	▲1.42
Total valid votes		14,457	97.26	
Total rejected ballots		334	2.25	
Unreturned ballots		74	0.50	
Turnout		14,865	62.72	▼9.34
Registered electors		23,700		
Majority		1,897	12.63	▼4.73
Sabah Heritage Party hold		Swing		
Source(s) "RESULTS OF CONTESTED ELECTION AND STATEMENTS OF THE POLL AFTER THE OFFICIAL ADDITION OF VOTES".

Sabah state election, 2018: Tanjong Kapor
Party	Candidate	Votes	%	∆%
Sabah Heritage Party	Ben Chong Chen Bin	9,124	52.92	▲52.92
BN	Teo Chee Kang	6,132	35.56	▼15.53
PAS	Aliasgar Omolong	617	3.58	▲3.58
Love Sabah Party	Thomas Tsen	481	2.79	▲2.79
Sabah People's Unity Party	Allaidly Poyon	446	2.59	▲2.59
Total valid votes		22,404	97.99	
Total rejected ballots		345	2.00	
Unreturned ballots		97	0.56	
Turnout		17,242	72.06	▼5.36
Registered electors		23,928		
Majority		2,992	17.36	▲5.95
Sabah Heritage Party gain from BN		Swing		?
Source(s) "RESULTS OF CONTESTED ELECTION AND STATEMENTS OF THE POLL AFTER THE OFFICIAL ADDITION OF VOTES".

Sabah state election, 2013: Tanjong Kapor
Party	Candidate	Votes	%	∆%
BN	Teo Chee Kang	8,890	51.09	▲1.00
PKR	William Chin Chung Kui	6,905	39.68	▲25.84
SAPP	Peter Tsen Heng Chong	500	2.87	▲2.87
MUPP	Zainal Nasiruddin	363	2.09	▲2.09
STAR	Hendiri @ Hendry Minar	273	1.57	▲1.57
Independent	Alexandra @ Alexander Anthony	35	0.20	▲0.20
Total valid votes		16,966	97.49	
Total rejected ballots		398	2.29	
Unreturned ballots		38	0.20	
Turnout		17,402	77.42	▲9.55
Registered electors		22,476		
Majority		1,985	11.41	▼15.94
BN hold		Swing		
Source(s) "KEPUTUSAN PILIHAN RAYA UMUM DEWAN UNDANGAN NEGERI". Archived from the original on 2022-10-16."Tindak Malaysia Github".

Sabah state election, 2008: Tanjong Kapor
Party	Candidate	Votes	%	∆%
BN	Teo Chee Kang	6,629	50.09	▲1.93
Independent	Peter Tsen Heng Chong	3,010	22.74	▲22.74
PKR	Ng Kim Kiat	1,831	13.84	▲13.45
Independent	Awang Karim Abdul Kadir	871	6.58	▲6.58
Independent	Edwin Pius @ Entak	109	0.82	▲0.82
Independent	Asbiah Anggar	73	0.55	▲0.55
Independent	Masiun Mupang	35	0.26	▲0.26
BERSEKUTU	Berman Angkap	32	0.24	▼0.16
Total valid votes		12,590	95.13	
Total rejected ballots		567	4.28	
Unreturned ballots		77	0.58	
Turnout		13,234	67.87	▼1.53
Registered electors		19,500		
Majority		3,619	27.35	▲4.23
BN hold		Swing		
Source(s) "KEPUTUSAN PILIHAN RAYA UMUM DEWAN UNDANGAN NEGERI PERAK BAGI TAHUN 2008"."Tindak Malaysia GitHub".

Sabah state election, 2004: Tanjong Kapor
Party	Candidate	Votes	%
BN	Chong Kah Kiat	6,234	48.16
Independent	Omar Mohd Aji	3,241	25.04
Independent	Kong Hong Ming @ Kong Fo Min	1,877	14.50
Independent	Wong Phin Chung	1,035	8.00
BERSEKUTU	Santong Angkap	52	0.40
PKR	Alexandra @ Alexander Anthony	50	0.39
PASOK	Bensali Ebrahim	44	0.34
Total valid votes		12,533	96.82
Total rejected ballots		332	2.56
Unreturned ballots		79	0.61
Turnout		12,944	69.40
Registered electors		18,652	
Majority		2,993	23.12
This was a new constituency created
Source(s) "KEPUTUSAN PILIHAN RAYA UMUM DEWAN UNDANGAN NEGERI PERAK BAGI TAHUN 2004"."Tindak Malaysia GitHub".
