= Ben Chong Chen Bin =

Malaysian politician

Yang Berhormat Datuk Chong Chen Bin PGDK ASDK MLA
- 张振彬

State Assistant Minister of Finance of Sabah
- Incumbent
- Assumed office 2 December 2025 Serving with Mohd Ishak Ayub
- Minister: Masidi Manjun
- Governor: Musa Aman
- Chief Minister: Hajiji Noor
- Preceded by: Tan Lee Fatt
- Constituency: Tanjong Kapor

State Assistant Minister of Trade and Industry of Sabah
- In office 16 May 2018 – 29 September 2020 Serving with Azhar Matussin
- Minister: Wilfred Madius Tangau
- Governor: Juhar Mahiruddin
- Chief Minister: Shafie Apdal
- Preceded by: Bolkiah Ismail
- Succeeded by: Mohd Tamin Zainal
- Constituency: Tanjong Kapor

Member of the Sabah State Legislative Assembly for Tanjong Kapor
- Incumbent
- Assumed office 9 May 2018
- Preceded by: Teo Chee Kang (BN–LDP)
- Majority: 2,992 (2018); 1,879 (2020); 359 (2025)

Faction represented in the Sabah State Legislative Assembly
- 2018–2023: Heritage Party
- 2023: Independent
- 2023–: Gabungan Rakyat Sabah

Personal details
- Born: Chong Chen Bin; 20 October 1978 (age 47) Kudat, Crown Colony of North Borneo (now Sabah, Malaysia)
- Party: Heritage Party (WARISAN) (2018-2023); Independent (2023); Parti Gagasan Rakyat Sabah (GAGASAN) (since 2023)
- Other political affiliations: Gabungan Rakyat Sabah (GRS) (since 2023)
- Occupation: Politician

Chinese name
- Traditional Chinese: 張振彬
- Simplified Chinese: 张振彬
- Hanyu Pinyin: Zhāng Zhènbīn

Ben Chong Chen Bin is a Malaysian politician who has served as Assistant Minister of Finance of Sabah in the Gabungan Rakyat Sabah (GRS) state administration under Chief Minister Hajiji Noor and Minister Masidi Manjun since December 2025, State Assistant Minister of Trade and Industry of Sabah in the Heritage Party (WARISAN) state administration under Chief Minister Shafie Apdal and Minister Wilfred Madius Tangau from May 2018 to the collapse of WARISAN state administration in September 2020, as well as Member of the Sabah State Legislative Assembly (MLA) for Tanjong Kapor since May 2018. He is a member of Parti Gagasan Rakyat Sabah (GAGASAN), a component party of the GRS coalition and formerly a member of WARISAN.

== Election results ==
Sabah State Legislative Assembly
Year	Constituency	Candidate	Votes	Pct	Opponent(s)	Votes	Pct	Ballots cast	Majority	Turnout
2018	N02 Tanjong Kapor	Chong Chen Bin (WARISAN)	9,124	54.32%	Teo Chee Kang (LDP)	6,132	36.50%	17,242	2,992	72.10%
2018	N02 Tanjong Kapor	Chong Chen Bin (WARISAN)	9,124	54.32%	Aliasgar Omolong (PAS)	617	3.67%	17,242	2,992	72.10%
2018	N02 Tanjong Kapor	Chong Chen Bin (WARISAN)	9,124	54.32%	Tsen Chou Yin (PCS)	481	2.86%	17,242	2,992	72.10%
2018	N02 Tanjong Kapor	Chong Chen Bin (WARISAN)	9,124	54.32%	Allaidly Poyon (PPRS)	446	2.65%	17,242	2,992	72.10%
2020	N04 Tanjong Kapor	Chong Chen Bin (WARISAN)	7,206	49.84%	Norlizah Gurahman (Sabah BERSATU)	5,327	36.85%	3,864	1,879	64.82%
2020	N04 Tanjong Kapor	Chong Chen Bin (WARISAN)	7,206	49.84%	Chin Kee Yong (LDP)	1,492	10.32%	3,864	1,879	64.82%
2020	N04 Tanjong Kapor	Chong Chen Bin (WARISAN)	7,206	49.84%	Shawn Davey Robert Lee (PCS)	221	1.53%	3,864	1,879	64.82%
2020	N04 Tanjong Kapor	Chong Chen Bin (WARISAN)	7,206	49.84%	Awang Karim Abdul Kadir (USNO Baru)	211	1.46%	3,864	1,879	64.82%
2025	N04 Tanjong Kapor	Chong Chen Bin (GAGASAN)	6,171	30.19%	Verdon Bahanda (IND)	5,812	28.43%	20,855	359	61.45%
2025	N04 Tanjong Kapor	Chong Chen Bin (GAGASAN)	6,171	30.19%	Terence Au Soon Fui (WARISAN)	4,737	23.17%	20,855	359	61.45%
2025	N04 Tanjong Kapor	Chong Chen Bin (GAGASAN)	6,171	30.19%	Kevin Lee Sip Kim (MCA)	1,455	7.12%	20,855	359	61.45%
2025	N04 Tanjong Kapor	Chong Chen Bin (GAGASAN)	6,171	30.19%	Muhammad Affan Jumahat (Sabah BERSATU)	1,262	6.17%	20,855	359	61.45%
2025	N04 Tanjong Kapor	Chong Chen Bin (GAGASAN)	6,171	30.19%	Shawn Davey Lee (STAR)	434	2.12%	20,855	359	61.45%
2025	N04 Tanjong Kapor	Chong Chen Bin (GAGASAN)	6,171	30.19%	Jetol Dangin (IMPIAN)	184	0.90%	20,855	359	61.45%
2025	N04 Tanjong Kapor	Chong Chen Bin (GAGASAN)	6,171	30.19%	Abdul Halim Yussof (PBK)	166	0.81%	20,855	359	61.45%
2025	N04 Tanjong Kapor	Chong Chen Bin (GAGASAN)	6,171	30.19%	Abdul Rahim Madtaip (IND)	105	0.51%	20,855	359	61.45%
2025	N04 Tanjong Kapor	Chong Chen Bin (GAGASAN)	6,171	30.19%	Awang Karim Abdul Kadir (ANAK NEGERI)	63	0.31%	20,855	359	61.45%
2025	N04 Tanjong Kapor	Chong Chen Bin (GAGASAN)	6,171	30.19%	Bonny Berman (SPP)	52	0.25%	20,855	359	61.45%

== Honours ==
- Sabah
  - Commander of the Order of Kinabalu (PGDK) – Datuk (2024)
  - Companion of the Order of Kinabalu (ASDK) (2018)
