= Libaran =

Federal constituency of Sabah, Malaysia

Libaran (P184)
Sabah constituency

Federal constituency
- Legislature: Dewan Rakyat
- MP: Suhaimi Nasir; BN
- Constituency created: 1994
- First contested: 1995
- Last contested: 2022

Demographics
- Population (2020): 171,452
- Electors (2025): 76,326
- Area (km²): 930
- Pop. density (per km²): 184.4

Libaran is a federal constituency in Sandakan Division (Sandakan District), Sabah, Malaysia, that has been represented in the Dewan Rakyat since 1995.

The federal constituency was created in the 1994 redistribution and is mandated to return a single member to the Dewan Rakyat under the first past the post voting system.

== Demographics ==
https://ge15.orientaldaily.com.my/seats/sabah/p

Ethnic breakdown of Libaran's electorate as of 2022
1. Malay-Muslim Bumiputera (42.3%)
2. Sabah Bumiputera (31.9%)
3. Chinese (16.0%)
4. Other ethnicities (9.70%)

As of 2020, Libaran has a population of 171,452 people.

Age breakdown of Libaran's electorate as of 2022
1. 18-20 (8.16%)
2. 21-29 (26.6%)
3. 30-39 (23.8%)
4. 40-49 (16.7%)
5. 50-59 (11.6%)
6. 60-69 (8.12%)
7. 70-79 (3.24%)
8. 80-89 (1.17%)
9. above 90 (0.62%)
Gender breakdown of Libaran's electorate as of 2022
1. Male (51.4%)
2. Female (48.6%)

== History ==
=== Polling districts ===
According to the gazette issued on 21 November 2025, the Libaran constituency has a total of 25 polling districts.

State constituency	Polling Districts	Code	Location
Gum-Gum（N50）	Semawang	184/50/01	SK Semawang
Gum-Gum（N50）	Dandulit	184/50/02	SK Gum-Gum Kecil
Gum-Gum（N50）	Gum-Gum	184/50/03	SK Batu 16 Gum-Gum
Gum-Gum（N50）	Sandala	184/50/04	SJK (C) Ming Chung
Gum-Gum（N50）	Jalan Labuk	184/50/05	SJK (C) Syn Hua
Gum-Gum（N50）	Sungai Dusun	184/50/06	SK Ulu Dusun
Gum-Gum（N50）	Jaya Bakti	184/50/07	SK Jaya Bakti
Gum-Gum（N50）	Pulau Libaran	184/50/08	SK Pulau Libaran
Gum-Gum（N50）	Sungai Tiram	184/50/09	SK Sungai Tiram
Gum-Gum（N50）	Batu 25 Jalan Labuk	184/50/10	SK Kg Pertanian
Sungai Manila（N51）	Sungai Batang	184/51/01	MRSM Tun Mohammad Fuad Stephens; SK Sibuga Besar
Sungai Manila（N51）	Sungai Manila	184/51/02	SMK Libaran
Sungai Manila（N51）	Batu 8 Jalan Labuk	184/51/03	SMK Taman Fajar
Sungai Manila（N51）	Sungai Padas	184/51/04	SK Sungai Padas
Sungai Manila（N51）	Rancangan Lubuh	184/51/05	SK Rancangan Lubuh
Sungai Manila（N51）	Tanjung Pisau	184/51/06	SK Tanjong Pisau
Sungai Sibuga（N52）	Sibuga	184/52/01	SMK Elopura
Sungai Sibuga（N52）	Sungai Kayu	184/52/02	SK Sungai Kayu
Sungai Sibuga（N52）	Taman Airport	184/52/03	SJK (C) Pui Gin; SMK Perempuan Sandakan
Sungai Sibuga（N52）	Nunuyan	184/52/04	SK Nunuyan Laut
Sungai Sibuga（N52）	Taman Merpati	184/52/05	SMK Merpati
Sungai Sibuga（N52）	Batu Putih Baru	184/52/06	SK Batu Putih Baru
Sungai Sibuga（N52）	Tinosa	184/52/07	SK Tinusa; SMK Tinusa
Sungai Sibuga（N52）	Taman Fajar	184/52/08	SK Merpati
Sungai Sibuga（N52）	Pulau Pamaguan	184/52/09	SK Pamaguan

=== Representation history ===
Members of Parliament for Libaran
Parliament	No	Years	Member	Party	Vote Share
Constituency created from Jambongan and Kinabatangan
9th	P160	1995-1999	Akbarkhan Abdul Rahman (أكبر خان عبدالرحمن)	BN (UMNO)	12,777; 69.27%
10th	P160	1999-2004	Juslie Ajirol (جوسلي أجيرول)	BN (UMNO)	11,303; 69.36%
11th	P184	2004-2008	Juslie Ajirol (جوسلي أجيرول)	BN (UMNO)	13,140; 84.17%
12th	P184	2008-2013	Juslie Ajirol (جوسلي أجيرول)	BN (UMNO)	13,668; 69.01%
13th	P184	2013-2018	Juslie Ajirol (جوسلي أجيرول)	BN (UMNO)	19,584; 62.56%
14th	P184	2018	Zakaria Edris (زكريا إدريس)	BN (UMNO)	17,799; 49.25%
14th	P184	2018-2019	Zakaria Edris (زكريا إدريس)	Independent	17,799; 49.25%
14th	P184	2019-2020	Zakaria Edris (زكريا إدريس)	PH (BERSATU)	17,799; 49.25%
14th	P184	2020-2022	Zakaria Edris (زكريا إدريس)	GRS (BERSATU)	17,799; 49.25%
15th	P184	2022–present	Suhaimi Nasir (سحيمي ناصر)	BN (UMNO)	22,969; 51.58%

=== State constituency ===
Parliamentary constituency	State constituency					
Parliamentary constituency	1967–1974	1974–1985	1985–1995	1995–2004	2004–2020	2020–present
Libaran					Gum-Gum	
Libaran				Sekong		
Libaran				Sungai Sibuga		
Libaran						Sungai Manila

=== Historical boundaries ===
State Constituency	Area		
State Constituency	1994	2003	2019
Gum-Gum		Gum-Gum; Kampung Luboh; Pulau Libaran; Sungai Tiram; Tamabanka	Gum-Gum; Kampung Dandulit; Pulau Libaran; Sungai Tiram; Tamabanka
Sekong	Kampung Suan Lamba; Kampung Lot M; Pulau Timbang; Segaliud; Sekong		
Sungai Sibuga	Gum-Gum; Kampung Tinusa; Pulau Libaran; Sungai Manila; Sungai Sibuga	Kampung Sentosa; Kampung Sungai Obar; Kampung Tinusa; Sungai Manila; Sungai Sibuga	Kampung Sungai Obar; Kampung Tinusa; Sungai Sibuga; Taman Evergreen; Taman Fajar
Sungai Manila			Kampung Luboh; Kampung Sentosa; Kampung Tabanka; Sungai Batang; Sungai Manila

=== Current state assembly members ===
No.	State Constituency	Member	Coalition (Party)
N50	Gum-Gum	Arunarsin Taib	WARISAN
N51	Sungai Manila	Hazem Mubarak Musa	GRS (GAGASAN)
N52	Sungai Sibuga	Nurulalsah Hassan Alban	WARISAN

=== Local governments & postcodes ===
No.	State Constituency	Local Government	Postcode
N50	Gum-Gum	Sandakan Municipal Council	90000 Sandakan
N51	Sungai Manila	Sandakan Municipal Council	90000 Sandakan
N52	Sungai Sibuga	Sandakan Municipal Council	90000 Sandakan

== Election results ==
Malaysian general election, 2022: Libaran
Party	Candidate	Votes	%	∆%
BN	Suhaimi Nasir	22,969	51.58	▲2.33
PH	Peter Jr Naintin	10,351	23.24	▲23.24
Heritage	Sh Bokrata Sh Hassan	9,185	20.63	▼26.74
PEJUANG	Jefri @ Amat Pudang	826	1.85	▲1.865
Independent	Adnan Tumpong	659	1.48	▲1.48
Sabah People's Unity Party	Nordi Khani	541	1.21	▲1.21
Total valid votes		44,531	100.00	
Total rejected ballots		907		
Unreturned ballots		194		
Turnout		45,632	61.56	▼16.18
Registered electors		72,332		
Majority		12,618	28.34	▲26.46
BN hold		Swing		
Source(s) https://lom.agc.gov.my/ilims/upload/portal/akta/outputp/1753262/PUB619_2022.pdf

Malaysian general election, 2018: Libaran
Party	Candidate	Votes	%	∆%
BN	Zakaria Edris	17,799	49.25	▼13.31
Sabah Heritage Party	Irwanshah Mustapa	17,121	47.37	▲47.37
Sabah People's Hope Party	Alfian Mansyur	1,223	3.38	▲3.38
Total valid votes		36,143	100.00	
Total rejected ballots		948		
Unreturned ballots		157		
Turnout		37,248	77.74	▼3.02
Registered electors		47,914		
Majority		678	1.88	▼35.13
BN hold		Swing		
Source(s) "His Majesty's Government Gazette - Notice of Contested Election, Parliament for the State of Sabah [P.U. (B) 246/2018]" (PDF). Attorney General's Chambers of Malaysia. 3 May 2018. "Federal Government Gazette - Results of Contested Election and Statements of the Poll after the Official Addition of Votes, Parliamentary Constituencies for the State of Sabah [P.U. (B) 320/2018]" (PDF). Attorney General's Chambers of Malaysia. 28 May 2018. Archived from the original (PDF) on 2019-12-29.

Malaysian general election, 2013: Libaran
Party	Candidate	Votes	%	∆%
BN	Juslie Ajirol	19,584	62.56	▼6.45
PKR	Mohd Serman Hassnar	7,998	25.55	▼5.44
Independent	Sahar Saka	3,219	10.28	▲10.28
STAR	Rosnah Unsari	502	1.60	▲1.60
Total valid votes		31,303	100.00	
Total rejected ballots		713		
Unreturned ballots		103		
Turnout		32,119	80.76	▲15.43
Registered electors		39,772		
Majority		11,586	37.01	▼1.01
BN hold		Swing		
Source(s) "Federal Government Gazette - Notice of Contested Election, Parliament for the State of Sabah [P.U. (B) 183/2013]" (PDF). Attorney General's Chambers of Malaysia. 26 April 2013. Archived from the original (PDF) on 2018-09-30. "Federal Government Gazette - Results of Contested Election and Statements of the Poll after the Official Addition of Votes, Parliamentary Constituencies for the State of Sabah [P.U. (B) 224/2013]" (PDF). Attorney General's Chambers of Malaysia. 22 May 2013. Archived from the original (PDF) on 2018-09-30.

Malaysian general election, 2008: Libaran
Party	Candidate	Votes	%	∆%
BN	Juslie Ajirol	13,668	69.01	▼15.16
PKR	Ahmad Thamrin @ Tamrin Mohd Jaini	6,139	30.99	▲15.16
Total valid votes		19,807	100.00	
Total rejected ballots		613		
Unreturned ballots		116		
Turnout		20,536	65.33	▲4.02
Registered electors		31,435		
Majority		7,529	38.02	▼30.32
BN hold		Swing		

Malaysian general election, 2004: Libaran
Party	Candidate	Votes	%	∆%
BN	Juslie Ajirol	13,140	84.17	▲14.81
PKR	Raj Munni Sabu @ Aiman Athirah Al Jundi	2,471	15.83	▼14.81
Total valid votes		15,611	100.00	
Total rejected ballots		804		
Unreturned ballots		69		
Turnout		16,484	61.31	▲13.14
Registered electors		26,888		
Majority		10,669	68.34	▲29.62
BN hold		Swing		

Malaysian general election, 1999: Libaran
Party	Candidate	Votes	%	∆%
BN	Juslie Ajirol	11,303	69.36	▲0.09
PKR	Muzhry Nasir	4,992	30.64	▲30.64
Total valid votes		16,295	100.00	
Total rejected ballots		231		
Unreturned ballots		185		
Turnout		16,711	48.17	▼8.08
Registered electors		34,687		
Majority		6,311	38.72	▼0.99
BN hold		Swing		

Malaysian general election, 1995: Libaran
Party	Candidate	Votes	%
BN	Akbarkhan Abdul Rahman	12,777	69.27
PBS	Nasir Uddin	5,453	29.56
Independent	Raman Kardi @ Marjok	215	1.17
Total valid votes		18,445	100.00
Total rejected ballots		276	
Unreturned ballots		22	
Turnout		18,743	56.25
Registered electors		33,323	
Majority		7,324	39.71
This was a new constituency created.
