= Teo Chee Kang =

Malaysian politician

Yang Berbahagia Datuk Seri Panglima Teo Chee Kang PJN SPDK JP
- 张志刚

President of Liberal Democratic Party
- In office 2014–2018
- Preceded by: Liew Vui Keong
- Succeeded by: Chin Su Phin

Member of the Sabah State Legislative Assembly for Tanjong Kapor
- In office 2008–2018
- Preceded by: Chong Kah Kiat
- Succeeded by: Ben Chong Chen Bin

Personal details
- Born: Teo Chee Kang; 13 November 1970 (age 55) Sabah, Malaysia
- Citizenship: Malaysian
- Party: Liberal Democratic Party
- Other political affiliations: Barisan Nasional (till 2018)
- Spouse: Ong Juang Hoong
- Occupation: Politician

Teo Chee Kang (Chinese: 張志剛; pinyin: Zhāng Zhìgāng; Jyutping: Zoeng1 Zi3 Gong1; Pe̍h-ōe-jī: Tiuⁿ Chì-kong) is a Malaysian politician from Liberal Democratic Party. He was the President of LDP from 2014 to 2018 and the Member of Sabah State Legislative Assembly for Tanjong Kapor from 2008 to 2018.

== Election results ==
Sabah State Legislative Assembly
Year	Constituency	Candidate	Votes	Pct	Opponent(s)	Votes	Pct	Ballots cast	Majority	Turnout
2008	N02 Tanjong Kapor	Teo Chee Kang (LDP)	6,629	50.09%	Peter Tsen Heng Chong (IND)	3,010	22.74%	13,234	3,619	67.87%
2008	N02 Tanjong Kapor	Teo Chee Kang (LDP)	6,629	50.09%	Ng Kim Kiat (PKR)	1,831	13.84%	13,234	3,619	67.87%
2008	N02 Tanjong Kapor	Teo Chee Kang (LDP)	6,629	50.09%	Awang Karim Abdul Kadir (IND)	871	6.58%	13,234	3,619	67.87%
2008	N02 Tanjong Kapor	Teo Chee Kang (LDP)	6,629	50.09%	Edwin Pius @ Entak (IND)	109	0.82%	13,234	3,619	67.87%
2008	N02 Tanjong Kapor	Teo Chee Kang (LDP)	6,629	50.09%	Asbiah Anggar (IND)	73	0.55%	13,234	3,619	67.87%
2008	N02 Tanjong Kapor	Teo Chee Kang (LDP)	6,629	50.09%	Masiun Mupang (IND)	35	0.26%	13,234	3,619	67.87%
2008	N02 Tanjong Kapor	Teo Chee Kang (LDP)	6,629	50.09%	Berman Angkap (BERSEKUTU)	32	0.24%	13,234	3,619	67.87%
2013	N02 Tanjong Kapor	Teo Chee Kang (LDP)	8,890	51.09%	William Chin Chung Kui (PKR)	6,905	39.68%	17,402	1,985	77.42%
2013	N02 Tanjong Kapor	Teo Chee Kang (LDP)	8,890	51.09%	Peter Tsen Heng Chong (SAPP)	500	2.87%	17,402	1,985	77.42%
2013	N02 Tanjong Kapor	Teo Chee Kang (LDP)	8,890	51.09%	Zainal Nasiruddin (MUPP)	363	2.09%	17,402	1,985	77.42%
2013	N02 Tanjong Kapor	Teo Chee Kang (LDP)	8,890	51.09%	Hendiri @ Hendry Minar (STAR)	273	1.57%	17,402	1,985	77.42%
2013	N02 Tanjong Kapor	Teo Chee Kang (LDP)	8,890	51.09%	Alexandra @ Alexander Anthony (IND)	35	0.20%	17,402	1,985	77.42%
2018	N02 Tanjong Kapor	Teo Chee Kang (LDP)	6,132	35.56%	Ben Chong Chen Bin (WARISAN)	9,124	52.92%	17,242	2,992	72.06%
2018	N02 Tanjong Kapor	Teo Chee Kang (LDP)	6,132	35.56%	Aliasgar Omolong (PAS)	617	3.58%	17,242	2,992	72.06%
2018	N02 Tanjong Kapor	Teo Chee Kang (LDP)	6,132	35.56%	Thomas Tsen (PCS)	481	2.79%	17,242	2,992	72.06%
2018	N02 Tanjong Kapor	Teo Chee Kang (LDP)	6,132	35.56%	Allaidly Poyon (PPRS)	446	2.59%	17,242	2,992	72.06%

== Honours ==
- Malaysia
  - Commander of the Order of Meritorious Service (PJN) – Datuk (2010)
- Sabah
  - Grand Commander of the Order of Kinabalu (SPDK) – Datuk Seri Panglima (2017)
  - Justice of the Peace (JP) (2006)
