= Phoong Jin Zhe =

Malaysian politician (born 1989)

Yang Berhormat Senator Datuk Phoong Jin Zhe PGDK ASDK
- 冯晋哲

Senator Appointed by the Yang di-Pertuan Agong
- Incumbent
- Assumed office 11 May 2026
- Monarch: Ibrahim
- Prime Minister: Anwar Ibrahim

State Minister of Industrial Development and Entrepreneurship of Sabah
- In office 1 February 2023 – 30 November 2025
- Governor: Juhar Mahiruddin (2020–2024); Musa Aman (2025)
- Chief Minister: Hajiji Noor
- Assistant: Andi Suryady
- Preceded by: Position established
- Succeeded by: Ewon Benedick
- Constituency: Luyang

State Minister of Industrial Development of Sabah
- In office 11 January 2023 – 1 February 2023
- Governor: Juhar Mahiruddin
- Chief Minister: Hajiji Noor
- Assistant: Andi Suryady
- Preceded by: Joachim Gunsalam
- Succeeded by: Position abolished
- Constituency: Luyang

State Minister of Youth and Sports of Sabah
- In office 21 May 2019 – 29 September 2020
- Governor: Juhar Mahiruddin
- Chief Minister: Shafie Apdal
- Assistant: Arunarsin Taib
- Preceded by: Poon Ming Fung
- Succeeded by: Ellron Alfred Angin
- Constituency: Luyang

Member of the Sabah State Legislative Assembly for Luyang
- In office 9 May 2018 – 29 November 2025
- Preceded by: Hiew King Cheu (BN–MCA)
- Succeeded by: Samuel Wong Tshun Chuen (WARISAN)
- Majority: 12,408 (2018); 14,521 (2020)

State Chairman of the Democratic Action Party of Sabah
- Incumbent
- Assumed office 27 October 2024
- Deputy: Chan Foong Hin
- Secretary-General: Anthony Loke Siew Fook
- Preceded by: Frankie Poon Ming Fung

Personal details
- Born: Phoong Jin Zhe; 3 January 1989 (age 37) Kota Kinabalu, Sabah, Malaysia
- Citizenship: Malaysia
- Party: Democratic Action Party (DAP)
- Other political affiliations: Pakatan Harapan (PH)
- Education: New Era University College
- Occupation: Politician

Phoong Jin Zhe (simplified Chinese: 冯晋哲; traditional Chinese: 馮晉哲; pinyin: Féng Jìnzhé; Pha̍k-fa-sṳ: Phùng Tsin-chet) (born 3 January 1989) also known as Ginger Phoong is a Malaysian politician who has served as a Senator since May 2026. He previously served as the State Minister of Industrial Development and Entrepreneurship of Sabah in the Gabungan Rakyat Sabah (GRS) state administration under Chief Minister Hajiji Noor from February 2023 to November 2025, State Minister of Industrial Development of Sabah in the GRS state administration under Chief Minister Hajiji from January 2023 to February 2023, State Minister of Youth and Sports of Sabah in the Heritage Party (WARISAN) administration under former Chief Minister Shafie Apdal from May 2019 to the collapse of the WARISAN administration in September 2020, as well as Member of the Sabah State Legislative Assembly (MLA) for Luyang from May 2018 to November 2025. He is a member of the Democratic Action Party (DAP), a component party of the Pakatan Harapan (PH) coalition. He was the DAP Socialist Youth Chief of Sabah, the youth wing of the party and currently serving as the State Chairman of DAP of Sabah since October 2024.

== Election results ==
Sabah State Legislative Assembly
Year	Constituency	Candidate	Votes	Pct	Opponent(s)	Votes	Pct	Ballots cast	Majority	Turnout
2018	N16 Luyang	Phoong Jin Zhe (DAP)	14,237	84.38%	Pamela Yong (MCA)	1,829	10.84%	17,031	12,408	78.10%
2018	N16 Luyang	Phoong Jin Zhe (DAP)	14,237	84.38%	Gee Tien Siong (SAPP)	807	4.78%	17,031	12,408	78.10%
2020	N21 Luyang	Phoong Jin Zhe (DAP)	15,510	90.56%	Gee Tien Siong (SAPP)	989	5.77%	17,127	14,521	66.45%
2020	N21 Luyang	Phoong Jin Zhe (DAP)	15,510	90.56%	Anthony Linggian @ Chong Yuk Ken (LDP)	279	1.63%	17,127	14,521	66.45%
2020	N21 Luyang	Phoong Jin Zhe (DAP)	15,510	90.56%	Wilson Chang Khai Sim (PCS)	190	1.11%	17,127	14,521	66.45%
2020	N21 Luyang	Phoong Jin Zhe (DAP)	15,510	90.56%	Chin Ling Ling (IND)	97	0.57%	17,127	14,521	66.45%
2020	N21 Luyang	Phoong Jin Zhe (DAP)	15,510	90.56%	Hiew King Cheu (GAGASAN)	62	0.36%	17,127	14,521	66.45%
2025	N19 Likas	Phoong Jin Zhe (DAP)	3,343	32.64%	Tham Yun Fook (WARISAN)	5,768	56.31%	10,319	2,425	54.16%
2025	N19 Likas	Phoong Jin Zhe (DAP)	3,343	32.64%	Yong Yit Jee (SAPP)	837	8.17%	10,319	2,425	54.16%
2025	N19 Likas	Phoong Jin Zhe (DAP)	3,343	32.64%	Louis Yong Yin Loong (IMPIAN)	209	2.04%	10,319	2,425	54.16%
2025	N19 Likas	Phoong Jin Zhe (DAP)	3,343	32.64%	Candy Chiew (PBK)	44	0.43%	10,319	2,425	54.16%
2025	N19 Likas	Phoong Jin Zhe (DAP)	3,343	32.64%	Ku Yuk Cheong (PKS)	42	0.41%	10,319	2,425	54.16%

== Honours ==
- Sabah
  - Commander of the Order of Kinabalu (PGDK) – Datuk (2023)
  - Companion of the Order of Kinabalu (ASDK) (2018)
