= Luyang (state constituency) =

Malaysian state constituency

Luyang (N21)
Sabah constituency

State constituency
- Legislature: Sabah State Legislative Assembly
MLA
Samuel Wong Tshun Chuen
Heritage
- Constituency created: 2003
- First contested: 2004
- Last contested: 2025

Demographics
- Electors (2025): 35,262

Luyang is a state constituency in Sabah, Malaysia, that has been represented in the Sabah State Legislative Assembly. It is mandated to return a single member to the Assembly under the first-past-the-post voting system.

== Demographics ==
As of 2020, Luyang has a population of 54,397 people.

Ethnic breakdown of Luyang's electorate as of 2025
1. Chinese (50.0%)
2. Non-Muslim Bumiputera (41.0%)
3. Muslim Bumiputera (9.00%)
4. Other ethnicities (0.00%)

== History ==
=== Polling districts ===
According to the gazette issued on 31 October 2022, the Luyang constituency has a total of 9 polling districts.

State constituency	Polling Districts	Code	Location
Luyang (N21)	Jalan Rumah Sakit	172/21/01	Tadika Peak Nam Toong
Luyang (N21)	Luyang	172/21/02	SJK (C) Anglo-Chinese
Luyang (N21)	Foh Sang	172/21/03	Institut Pendidikan Guru Kampus Gaya; Dewan Serbaguna Wisma Pertanian
Luyang (N21)	Jindo	172/21/04	Dewan Serbaguna Luyang
Luyang (N21)	Bukit Padang	172/21/05	Dewan Foochow Bukit Padang
Luyang (N21)	Kepayan Ridge	172/21/06	SM Maktab Sabah
Luyang (N21)	Taman Fu Yen	172/21/07	SMK Taman Tun Fuad
Luyang (N21)	Jalan Penampang	172/21/08	SK Sri Gaya
Luyang (N21)	Lido	172/21/09	SMK Tinggi Kota Kinabalu

=== Representation history ===
Member of Sabah State Legislative Assembly for Luyang
Assembly	No	Years	Member	Party
Constituency created from Sembulan and Api-Api
12th	N16	2004 – 2008	Melanie Chia Chui Ket (谢秋菊)	BN (SAPP)
13th	N16	2008	Melanie Chia Chui Ket (谢秋菊)	BN (SAPP)
13th	N16	2008 – 2013	Melanie Chia Chui Ket (谢秋菊)	SAPP
14th	N16	2013	Hiew King Cheu (邱庆洲)	DAP
14th	N16	2013 – 2014	Hiew King Cheu (邱庆洲)	IND
14th	N16	2014 – 2018	Hiew King Cheu (邱庆洲)	BN (MCA)
15th	N16	2018 – 2020	Phoong Jin Zhe (冯晋哲)	PH (DAP)
16th	N21	2020 – 2025	Phoong Jin Zhe (冯晋哲)	PH (DAP)
17th	N21	2025–present	Samuel Wong Tshun Chuen (黄俊铨)	WARISAN

== Election results ==
Sabah state election, 2025
Party	Candidate	Votes	%	∆%
Heritage	Samuel Wong Tshun Chuen	11,942	61.23	▼28.39
PH	Chan Loong Wei	5,243	26.88	▲26.88
SAPP	Gee Tien Siong	1,621	8.31	▲8.31
Sabah Dream Party	Paul Chong Hock Keing	412	2.11	▲2.11
PN	William Ooi Hong Wee	285	1.46	▼4.25
Total valid votes		19,503		
Total rejected ballots		113		
Unreturned ballots		42		
Turnout		19,658	55.75	▼10.70
Registered electors		35,262		
Majority		6,699	34.35	▼49.56
Heritage hold		Swing		
Source(s) "RESULTS OF CONTESTED ELECTION AND STATEMENTS OF THE POLL AFTER THE OFFICIAL ADDITION OF VOTES" (PDF).

Sabah state election, 2020
Party	Candidate	Votes	%	∆%
Sabah Heritage Party	Phoong Jin Zhe	15,510	89.62	▲89.62
PN	Gee Tien Siong	989	5.71	▲5.71
LDP	Anthony Linggian	279	1.61	▲1.61
Love Sabah Party	Wilson Chang Khai Sim	190	1.10	▲1.10
Independent	Chin Ling Ling	97	0.56	▲0.56
GAGASAN	Hiew King Cheu	62	0.36	▲0.36
Total valid votes		17,127	98.97	
Total rejected ballots		135	0.78	
Unreturned ballots		44	0.25	
Turnout		17,306	66.45	▼11.62
Registered electors		25,775		
Majority		14,521	83.91	▲11.06
Sabah Heritage Party hold		Swing		
Source(s) "RESULTS OF CONTESTED ELECTION AND STATEMENTS OF THE POLL AFTER THE OFFICIAL ADDITION OF VOTES".

Sabah state election, 2018
Party	Candidate	Votes	%	∆%
DAP	Phoong Jin Zhe	14,237	83.59	▲83.59
BN	Pamela Yong	1,829	10.74	▼5.28
SAPP	Gee Tien Siong	807	4.74	▼5.95
Total valid votes		22,404	97.99	
Total rejected ballots		112	0.66	
Unreturned ballots		46	0.27	
Turnout		17,031	78.07	▼0.63
Registered electors		21,815		
Majority		12,408	72.85	▲18.09
PH hold		Swing		
Source(s) "RESULTS OF CONTESTED ELECTION AND STATEMENTS OF THE POLL AFTER THE OFFICIAL ADDITION OF VOTES".

Sabah state election, 2013
Party	Candidate	Votes	%	∆%
DAP	Hiew King Cheu	11,213	70.78	▲40.17
BN	Agnes Shim Tshin Nyuk	2,537	16.02	▼27.46
SAPP	Melanie Chia Chui Ket	1,694	10.69	▲10.69
STAR	Jafery Jomion	259	1.63	▲1.63
Total valid votes		15,703	99.13	
Total rejected ballots		110	0.69	
Unreturned ballots		28	0.18	
Turnout		15,841	78.70	▲13.01
Registered electors		20,119		
Majority		8,676	54.76	▲41.89
DAP gain from BN		Swing		?
Source(s) "KEPUTUSAN PILIHAN RAYA UMUM DEWAN UNDANGAN NEGERI".

Sabah state election, 2008
Party	Candidate	Votes	%	∆%
BN	Melanie Chia Chui Ket	5,073	43.48	▼17.10
DAP	Fung Kong Win	3,571	30.61	▲30.61
PKR	Alexander Wong Yun Kong	2,794	23.95	▼13.75
Independent	Chin Fung Vui @ Bernard	92	0.79	▲0.79
Total valid votes		11,530	98.82	
Total rejected ballots		95	0.81	
Unreturned ballots		43	0.37	
Turnout		11,668	65.69	▲6.27
Registered electors		17,761		
Majority		1,502	12.87	▼10.02
BN hold		Swing		
Source(s) "KEPUTUSAN PILIHAN RAYA UMUM DEWAN UNDANGAN NEGERI SABAH BAGI TAHUN 2008".

Sabah state election, 2004
Party	Candidate	Votes	%
BN	Melanie Chia Chui Ket	5,965	60.58
PKR	Christina Liew	3,711	37.69
Total valid votes		9,676	98.27
Total rejected ballots		139	1.41
Unreturned ballots		31	0.31
Turnout		9,846	59.42
Registered electors		16,570	
Majority		2,254	22.89
This was a new constituency created.
Source(s) "KEPUTUSAN PILIHAN RAYA UMUM DEWAN UNDANGAN NEGERI SABAH BAGI TAHUN 2004".
