= Sungai Sibuga =

State constituency of Sabah

Sungai Sibuga (N52)
Sabah constituency

State constituency
- Legislature: Sabah State Legislative Assembly
MLA
Nurulalsah Hassan Alban
Heritage
- Constituency created: 1984
- First contested: 1986
- Last contested: 2025

Demographics
- Population (2020): 75,651
- Electors (2025): 38,678

Sungai Sibuga is a state constituency in Sabah, Malaysia, that is represented in the Sabah State Legislative Assembly.

== Demographics ==
As of 2020, Sungai Sibuga has a population of 75,651 people.

Ethnic breakdown of Sungai Sibuga's electorate as of 2025
1. Muslim Bumiputera (82.0%)
2. Chinese (11.5%)
3. Non-Muslim Bumiputera (6.50%)
4. Other ethnicities (0.00%)

== History ==
=== Polling districts ===
According to the gazette issued on 31 October, the Sungai Sibuga constituency has a total of 9 polling districts.

State constituency	Polling Districts	Code	Location
Sungai Sibuga（N52）	Sibuga	184/52/01	SMK Elopura
Sungai Sibuga（N52）	Sungai Kayu	184/52/02	SK Sungai Kayu
Sungai Sibuga（N52）	Taman Airport	184/52/03	SMK Perempuan Sandakan
Sungai Sibuga（N52）	Nunuyan	184/52/04	SK Nunuyan Laut
Sungai Sibuga（N52）	Taman Merpati	184/52/05	SMK Merpati
Sungai Sibuga（N52）	Batu Putih Baru	184/52/06	SK Batu Putih Baru
Sungai Sibuga（N52）	Tinosa	184/52/07	SK Tinusa; SMK Tinusa
Sungai Sibuga（N52）	Taman Fajar	184/52/08	SK Merpati
Sungai Sibuga（N52）	Pulau Pamaguan	184/52/09	SK Pamaguan

=== Representation history ===
Member of Sabah State Legislative Assembly for Sungai Sibuga
Assembly	No	Years	Member	Party
Constituency created from Semawang and Elopura
7th	N17	1985–1986	Bernard Chu Thau Hien (周道贤)	PBS
8th	N17	1986–1990	Michael Tan Kun Boo (陈君武)	PBS
9th	N17	1990–1994	Thien Fui Yun (邓辉云)	GR (PBS)
10th	N17	1994–1999	Musa Aman	BN (UMNO)
11th	N34	1999–2004	Musa Aman	BN (UMNO)
12th	N42	2004–2008	Musa Aman	BN (UMNO)
13th	N42	2008–2013	Musa Aman	BN (UMNO)
14th	N42	2013–2018	Musa Aman	BN (UMNO)
15th	N42	2018–2020	Musa Aman	BN (UMNO)
16th	N52	2020–2025	Mohamad Hamsan Awang Supain	BN (UMNO)
16th	N52	2025	Vacant (Note: Vacant from 19 January 2025 until the 2025 state election due to the incumbent died in office.)	
17th	N52	2025–present	Nurulalsah Hassan Alban	WARISAN

== Election results ==
Sabah state election, 2025: Sungai Sibuga
Party	Candidate	Votes	%	∆%
Heritage	Nurulalsah Hassan Alban	6,619	30.24	▼10.43
BN	Suhaimi Nasir	6,531	29.84	▼21.25
GRS	Amirshah Yaakub	6,493	29.66	▲29.66
PN	Norani Asmatil	1,662	7.59	▲7.59
Sabah Dream Party	Ismail Md Said	584	2.67	▲2.67
Total valid votes		21,889		
Total rejected ballots		432		
Unreturned ballots		47		
Turnout		22,368	57.83	▼5.53
Registered electors		38,678		
Majority		88	0.40	▼10.02
Sabah Heritage Party gain from BN		Swing		?
Source(s) "RESULTS OF CONTESTED ELECTION AND STATEMENTS OF THE POLL AFTER THE OFFICIAL ADDITION OF VOTES" (PDF).

Sabah state election, 2020: Sungai Sibuga
Party	Candidate	Votes	%	∆%
BN	Mohamad Hamsan Awang Supain	7,545	51.09	▼1.17
Sabah Heritage Party	Armani Mahiruddin	6,007	40.67	▼3.72
Love Sabah Party	Irwanshah Mustapa	526	3.56	▲3.56
LDP	Kemella Hasan	126	0.85	▲0.85
Sabah People's Unity Party	Mohd Jain Aliuddin	114	0.77	▲0.77
Total valid votes		14,318	96.95	
Total rejected ballots		340	2.30	
Unreturned ballots		111	0.75	
Turnout		14,769	63.36	▼14.92
Registered electors		23,308		
Majority		1,538	10.42	▲2.55
BN hold		Swing		
Source(s) "RESULTS OF CONTESTED ELECTION AND STATEMENTS OF THE POLL AFTER THE OFFICIAL ADDITION OF VOTES".

Sabah state election, 2018: Sungai Sibuga
Party	Candidate	Votes	%	∆%
BN	Musa Aman	14,503	52.26	▼20.48
Sabah Heritage Party	Asmara Abdul Rahman	12,319	44.39	▲44.39
Sabah Nationality Party	Osman Enting	241	0.87	▲0.87
Total valid votes		27,063	97.52	
Total rejected ballots		525	1.89	
Unreturned ballots		164	0.59	
Turnout		27,752	78.28	▼3.29
Registered electors		35,454		
Majority		2,184	7.87	▼42.71
BN hold		Swing		{{{2}}}
Source(s) "RESULTS OF CONTESTED ELECTION AND STATEMENTS OF THE POLL AFTER THE OFFICIAL ADDITION OF VOTES".

Sabah state election, 2013: Sungai Sibuga
Party	Candidate	Votes	%	∆%
BN	Musa Aman	16,637	72.74	▲0.31
PKR	Irwahshah Mustapa	5,068	22.16	▲2.20
STAR	Jaffar @ Damaid Juana	265	1.16	▲1.16
SAPP	Mohd Roslan Yussof	215	0.94	▲0.94
Independent	Mohd Arshad Abdul	201	0.88	▲0.88
Total valid votes		22,386	97.88	
Total rejected ballots		414	1.81	
Unreturned ballots		71	0.31	
Turnout		22,871	81.57	▲13.51
Registered electors		28,038		
Majority		11,569	50.58	▼1.89
BN hold		Swing		
Source(s) "KEPUTUSAN PILIHAN RAYA UMUM DEWAN UNDANGAN NEGERI".

Sabah state election, 2008: Sungai Sibuga
Party	Candidate	Votes	%	∆%
BN	Musa Aman	10,570	72.43	▼3.48
PKR	Tharmin Mohd Jaini	2,913	19.96	▲19.96
Independent	Gusniah Diong	295	2.02	▲2.02
BERSEKUTU	Osman Enting	291	1.99	▲1.99
Total valid votes		14,069	96.40	
Total rejected ballots		425	2.91	
Unreturned ballots		100	0.69	
Turnout		14,594	68.06	▲3.55
Registered electors		21,442		
Majority		7,657	52.47	▼5.94
BN hold		Swing		
Source(s) "KEPUTUSAN PILIHAN RAYA UMUM DEWAN UNDANGAN NEGERI SABAH BAGI TAHUN 2008".

Sabah state election, 2004: Sungai Sibuga
Party	Candidate	Votes	%	∆%
BN	Musa Aman	8,668	75.91	▲21.53
Independent	Lue Sue Seng	1,998	17.50	▲17.50
PAS	Abdul Gani Kosui	415	3.63	▲3.63
Total valid votes		11,081	97.04	
Total rejected ballots		270	2.36	
Unreturned ballots		68	0.60	
Turnout		11,419	64.51	▲0.44
Registered electors		17,702		
Majority		6,670	58.41	▲30.73
BN hold		Swing		
Source(s) "KEPUTUSAN PILIHAN RAYA UMUM DEWAN UNDANGAN NEGERI SABAH BAGI TAHUN 2004".

Sabah state election, 1999: Sungai Sibuga
Party	Candidate	Votes	%	∆%
BN	Musa Aman	7,927	54.38	▼8.63
PBS	Ramli Noordin	3,893	26.70	▼7.86
BERSEKUTU	Musa Jala	2,166	14.86	▲14.38
SETIA	Isnain Amat	289	1.98	▲1.66
Total valid votes		14,275	97.92	
Total rejected ballots		303	2.08	
Unreturned ballots		0	0.00	
Turnout		14,578	64.07	▼1.22
Registered electors		22,754		
Majority		4,034	27.68	▼0.77
BN hold		Swing		
Source(s) "KEPUTUSAN PILIHAN RAYA UMUM DEWAN UNDANGAN NEGERI SABAH BAGI TAHUN 1999".

Sabah state election, 1994: Sungai Sibuga
Party	Candidate	Votes	%	∆%
BN	Musa Aman	8,211	63.01	▲63.01
PBS	Thim Fun Yun	4,503	34.56	▼9.38
BERSEKUTU	Hamid @ Piging Jan	63	0.48	▲0.48
SETIA	Satiman Taman	42	0.32	▲0.32
Total valid votes		12,819	98.37	
Total rejected ballots		212	1.63	
Unreturned ballots		0	0.00	
Turnout		13,031	65.29	▼0.61
Registered electors		19,960		
Majority		3,708	28.45	▲27.50
BN gain from PBS		Swing		?
Source(s) "KEPUTUSAN PILIHAN RAYA UMUM DEWAN UNDANGAN NEGERI SABAH BAGI TAHUN 1994".

Sabah state election, 1990: Sungai Sibuga
Party	Candidate	Votes	%	∆%
PBS	Thien Fui Yun	3,908	43.94	▼1.41
USNO	Juslie Ajirol	3,823	42.99	▲3.03
BERJAYA	Mukri Taipsapara	457	5.14	▼7.73
AKAR	Saman Ghulam	260	2.92	▲2.92
PRS	Bernard Willie	197	2.22	▲2.22
LDP	Lai Vai Ming @ Lai Kheng Ming	127	1.43	▲1.43
Total valid votes		8,772	98.64	
Total rejected ballots		121	1.36	
Unreturned ballots		0	0.00	
Turnout		8,893	65.90	▼5.69
Registered electors		13,494		
Majority		85	0.95	▼4.44
PBS hold		Swing		
Source(s) "KEPUTUSAN PILIHAN RAYA UMUM DEWAN UNDANGAN NEGERI SABAH BAGI TAHUN 1990".

Sabah state election, 1986: Sungai Sibuga
Party	Candidate	Votes	%	∆%
PBS	Micheal Tan Kun Boo	3,140	45.71	▲9.42
USNO	Ahmad Thamrin Mohd Jaini	2,767	40.28	▲5.86
BERJAYA	Vincent Hiew Syn Choi	891	12.97	▲12.97
Independent	Rusli Udam	71	1.03	
Total valid votes		6,869	100.00	
Total rejected ballots		373		
Unreturned ballots		0		
Turnout		7,242	71.59	▲1.09
Registered electors		10,113		
Majority		373	5.43	▼5.00
PBS hold		Swing		
Source(s) "KEPUTUSAN PILIHAN RAYA UMUM DEWAN UNDANGAN NEGERI SABAH BAGI TAHUN 1986".

Sabah state election, 1985: Sungai Sibuga
Party	Candidate	Votes	%
PBS	Bernard Chu Thau Hien	2,183	36.29
USNO	Ahmad Thamrin Mohd Jaini	2,054	34.14
BERJAYA	Hassnar Ebrahim	1,664	27.66
Independent	Lahan Kahar	87	1.45
Independent	H. Lawrence Piki	28	0.47
Total valid votes		6,016	100.00
Total rejected ballots		129	
Unreturned ballots		0	
Turnout		6,145	70.50
Registered electors		8,712	
Majority		129	2.14
This was a new seat created.
