= Zakaria Edris =

Malaysian politician

Yang Berbahagia Datuk Zakaria Mohd Edris DMSM JP

Member of the Malaysian Parliament for Libaran
- In office 9 May 2018 – 19 November 2022
- Preceded by: Juslie Ajirol (BN–UMNO)
- Succeeded by: Suhaimi Nasir (BN–UMNO)
- Majority: 678 (2018)

State Assistant Minister of Housing and Local Government of Sabah
- In office 2013–2018
- Governor: Juhar Mahiruddin
- Chief Minister: Musa Aman
- Constituency: Gum-Gum

Member of the Sabah State Legislative Assembly for Gum-Gum
- In office 21 March 2004 – 9 May 2018
- Preceded by: Position established
- Succeeded by: Arunarnsin Taib (WARISAN)
- Majority: 2,498 (2004); Walkover (2008); 2,357 (2013)

Faction represented in Dewan Rakyat
- 2018: Barisan Nasional
- 2018–2019: Independent
- 2019–2020: Pakatan Harapan
- 2020: Malaysian United Indigenous Party
- 2020–2022: Perikatan Nasional

Faction represented in Sabah State Legislative Assembly
- 2004–2018: Barisan Nasional

Personal details
- Born: 16 July 1950 (age 75) Crown Colony of North Borneo
- Citizenship: Malaysian
- Party: United Malays National Organisation (UMNO) (–2018); Independent (2018–2019); Malaysian United Indigenous Party (BERSATU) (2019–2023); Gagasan Rakyat (since 2023)
- Other political affiliations: Barisan Nasional (BN) (–2018, aligned:since 2020); Pakatan Harapan (PH) (2019–2020); Perikatan Nasional (PN) (2020-2023); Gabungan Rakyat Sabah (GRS) (aligned:since 2020, member:since 2023)
- Occupation: Politician

Zakaria bin Mohd Edris (born 16 July 1950) is a Malaysian politician who served as the Member of Parliament (MP) for Libaran from May 2018 to November 2022, State Assistant Minister of Housing and Local Government of Sabah in the Barisan Nasional (BN) administration under former Chief Minister Musa Aman from 2013 to 2018 and Member of the Sabah State Legislative Assembly (MLA) for Gum-Gum from March 2004 to May 2018. He is a former member of Malaysian United Indigenous Party (BERSATU), an official main component party of the Perikatan Nasional (PN) and a former component party of Gabungan Rakyat Sabah (GRS) coalition also a former component party of Pakatan Harapan (PH) coalition. He also a former member of the United Malays National Organisation (UMNO), a component party of the BN coalition. He left UMNO to be an independent in 2018 and later joined BERSATU in 2019 until 2023. In 2023, he officially became the member of Sabah People's Ideas Party (Gagasan Rakyat), the main component party of Gabungan Rakyat Sabah (GRS) along with 7 other parties.

== Political career ==
In the 2018 election, UMNO fielded him to contest the Libaran parliamentary seat, facing a new candidate Irwanshah Mustapa from the Sabah Heritage Party (WARISAN) and subsequently won.

== Election results ==
Sabah State Legislative Assembly
Year	Constituency	Candidate	Votes	Pct	Opponent(s)	Votes	Pct	Ballots cast	Majority	Turnout
2004	N41 Gum-Gum	Zakaria Edris (UMNO)	3,679	75.70%	Tan Mui Ling (PKR)	1,181	24.30%	5,069	2,498	55.26%
2008	N41 Gum-Gum	Zakaria Edris (UMNO)	Walkover							
2013	N41 Gum-Gum	Zakaria Edris (UMNO)	5,548	61.37%	Ahmad Thamrin Mohd Jaini (PKR)	3,191	35.30%	9,220	2,357	78.80%
2013	N41 Gum-Gum	Zakaria Edris (UMNO)	5,548	61.37%	Hassan Hami (STAR)	301	3.33%	9,220	2,357	78.80%

Parliament of Malaysia
Year	Constituency	Candidate	Votes	Pct	Opponent(s)	Votes	Pct	Ballots cast	Majority	Turnout
2018	P184 Libaran	Zakaria Edris (UMNO)	17,799	49.25%	Irwanshah Mustapa (WARISAN)	17,121	47.37%	37,091	678	77.74%
2018	P184 Libaran	Zakaria Edris (UMNO)	17,799	49.25%	Alfian Mansyur (PHRS)	1,223	3.38%	37,091	678	77.74%

== Honours ==
- Malacca
  - Companion Class I of the Exalted Order of Malacca (DMSM) – Datuk (2005)
- Sabah
  - Justice of the Peace (JP) (2024)

== See also ==
- Libaran (federal constituency)
