= Gum-Gum (state constituency) =

Gum-Gum (N50)
Sabah constituency

State constituency
- Legislature: Sabah State Legislative Assembly
MLA
Arunarsin Taib
Heritage
- Constituency created: 2004
- First contested: 2004
- Last contested: 2025

Demographics
- Electors (2025): 19,433

Gum-Gum is a state constituency in Sabah, Malaysia, that is represented in the Sabah State Legislative Assembly.

== Demographics ==
As of 2020, Gum-Gum has a population of 72,785 people.

Ethnic breakdown of Gum-Gum's electorate as of 2025
1. Muslim Bumiputera (69.0%)
2. Chinese (19.0%)
3. Non-Muslim Bumiputera (12.0%)
4. Other ethnicities (0.00%)

== History ==
=== Polling districts ===
According to the gazette issued on 31 October, the Gum-Gum constituency has a total of 10 polling districts.

State constituency	Polling Districts	Code	Location
Gum-Gum（N50）	Semawang	184/50/01	SK Semawang
Gum-Gum（N50）	Dandulit	184/50/02	SK Gum-Gum Kecil
Gum-Gum（N50）	Gum-Gum	184/50/03	SK Batu 16 Gum-Gum
Gum-Gum（N50）	Sandala	184/50/04	SJK (C) Ming Chung
Gum-Gum（N50）	Jalan Labuk	184/50/05	SJK (C) Syn Hua
Gum-Gum（N50）	Sungai Dusun	184/50/06	SK Ulu Dusun
Gum-Gum（N50）	Jaya Bakti	184/50/07	SK Jaya Bakti
Gum-Gum（N50）	Pulau Libaran	184/50/08	SK Pulau Libaran
Gum-Gum（N50）	Sungai Tiram	184/50/09	SK Sungai Tiram
Gum-Gum（N50）	Batu 25 Jalan Labuk	184/50/10	SK Kg Pertanian

=== Representation history ===
Member of Sabah State Legislative Assembly for Gum-Gum
Assembly	No	Years	Member	Party
Constituency created from Sekong, Labuk and Sungai Sibuga
12th	N41	2004 – 2008	Zakaria Edris	BN (UMNO)
13th	N41	2008 – 2013	Zakaria Edris	BN (UMNO)
14th	N41	2013 – 2018	Zakaria Edris	BN (UMNO)
15th	N41	2018 – 2020	Arunarsin Taib	WARISAN
16th	N50	2020 – 2025	Arunarsin Taib	WARISAN
17th	N50	2025–present	Arunarsin Taib	WARISAN

== Election results ==
Sabah state election, 2025
Party	Candidate	Votes	%	∆%
Heritage	Arunarsin Taib	2,997	26.20	▼12.06
PN	Yunus Nurdin	1,894	16.55	▲16.55
PH	Abdul Said Pimping	1,863	16.28	▲16.28
Independent	Salzo Asa	1,802	15.75	▲15.75
UPKO	Peter Jr Naintin	1,568	13.71	▲13.71
Independent	Mohd Yusuf Yoda	693	6.06	▲6.06
Independent	Asmawi Asa	321	2.81	▲2.81
Sabah Dream Party	Esnin Satur	205	1.79	▲1.79
Independent	Fadly Voon	98	0.86	▲0.86
Total valid votes		11,441		
Total rejected ballots		286		
Unreturned ballots		21		
Turnout		11,748	60.45	▼5.34
Registered electors		19,433		
Majority		1,103	9.65	▲6.37
Heritage hold		Swing		

Sabah state election, 2020
Party	Candidate	Votes	%	∆%
Sabah Heritage Party	Arunarsin Taib	3,140	38.26	▼11.36
BN	Suhaimi Nasir	2,871	34.98	▼8.34
Independent	Yunus Nurdin	1,690	20.59	▲20.59
Love Sabah Party	Undang Tumpong	172	2.10	▲2.10
LDP	Jainudin Berahim	113	1.38	▲1.38
Sabah People's Unity Party	Riduan Sampai	23	0.28	▲0.28
Total valid votes		8,009	98.59	
Total rejected ballots		180	2.19	
Unreturned ballots		18	0.22	
Turnout		8,207	65.79	▼10.40
Registered electors		12,474		
Majority		269	3.28	▼3.02
Sabah Heritage Party hold		Swing		
Source(s) "RESULTS OF CONTESTED ELECTION AND STATEMENTS OF THE POLL AFTER THE OFFICIAL ADDITION OF VOTES". Archived from the original on 2022-09-28.

Sabah state election, 2018
Party	Candidate	Votes	%	∆%
Sabah Heritage Party	Arunarsin Taib	4,710	49.62	▲49.62
BN	Juslie Ajirol	4,112	43.32	▼11.67
Sabah People's Hope Party	Dahil Masdik	252	2.65	▲2.65
Sabah Nationality Party	Joilin @ Christine Bugung	81	0.85	▲0.85
Sabah People's Unity Party	Jamaludin Lamba	63	0.66	▲0.66
Total valid votes		9,218	97.10	
Total rejected ballots		229	2.41	
Unreturned ballots		46	0.48	
Turnout		9,493	76.19	▼2.62
Registered electors		12,460		
Majority		598	6.30	▼19.19
Sabah Heritage Party gain from BN		Swing		?
Source(s) "RESULTS OF CONTESTED ELECTION AND STATEMENTS OF THE POLL AFTER THE OFFICIAL ADDITION OF VOTES". Archived from the original on 2022-09-28.

Sabah state election, 2013
Party	Candidate	Votes	%	∆%
BN	Zakaria Edris	5,548	59.99	
PKR	Thamrin Mohd Zaini	3,191	34.50	
STAR	Hassan Hami @ Hamid	301	3.25	
Total valid votes		9,040	97.75	
Total rejected ballots		180	1.95	
Unreturned ballots		28	0.30	
Turnout		9,248	78.81	
Registered electors		11,734		
Majority		2,357	25.49	
BN hold		Swing		
Source(s) "KEPUTUSAN PILIHAN RAYA UMUM DEWAN UNDANGAN NEGERI".

Sabah state election, 2008
Party	Candidate	Votes	%	∆%
On the nomination day, Zakaria Edris won uncontested.
BN	Zakaria Edris			
Total valid votes				
Total rejected ballots				
Unreturned ballots				
Turnout				
Registered electors				
Majority				
BN hold		Swing		
Source(s) "KEPUTUSAN PILIHAN RAYA UMUM DEWAN UNDANGAN NEGERI SABAH BAGI TAHUN 2004".

Sabah state election, 2004
Party	Candidate	Votes	%
BN	Zakaria Edris	3,679	72.48
PKR	Zaharah Tan Mui Ling	1,181	23.27
Total valid votes		4,860	95.74
Total rejected ballots		209	4.12
Unreturned ballots		7	0.14
Turnout		5,076	55.26
Registered electors		9,186	
Majority		2,498	49.21
This was a new constituency created.
Source(s) "KEPUTUSAN PILIHAN RAYA UMUM DEWAN UNDANGAN NEGERI SABAH BAGI TAHUN 2004".
