= Arunarnsin Taib =

Malaysian politician (born 1966)

Yang Berhormat Tuan Arunarnsin Taib ASDK BK MLA
- أرونارنسين طائب

State Assistant Minister of Youth and Sports of Sabah
- In office 16 May 2018 – 29 September 2020
- Minister: Frankie Poon Ming Fung (2018–2019); Phoong Jin Zhe (2019–2020)
- Governor: Juhar Mahiruddin
- Chief Minister: Shafie Apdal
- Preceded by: Masiung Banah
- Succeeded by: Andi Suryady
- Constituency: Gum-Gum

Member of the Sabah State Legislative Assembly for Gum-Gum
- Incumbent
- Assumed office 9 May 2018
- Preceded by: Zakaria Edris (BN–UMNO)
- Majority: 598 (2018); 269 (2020); 1,103 (2025)

Faction represented in the Sabah State Legislative Assembly
- 2018–: Heritage Party

Personal details
- Born: Arunarnsin bin Taib; 19 January 1966 (age 60) Sandakan, Crown Colony of North Borneo (now Sabah, Malaysia)
- Party: Heritage Party (WARISAN)
- Education: Kinabalu Commercial College
- Occupation: Politician

Arunarnsin Taib (born 19 January 1966) is a Malaysian politician who has served as the State Assistant Minister of Youth and Sports of Sabah in the Heritage Party (WARISAN) administration under former Chief Minister Shafie Apdal and former Ministers Frankie Poon Ming Fung and Ginger Phoong Jin Zhe from May 2018 to the collapse of the WARISAN administration in September 2020, as well as Member of the Sabah State Legislative Assembly (MLA) for Gum-Gum since May 2018.

== Election results ==
Sabah State Legislative Assembly
Year	Constituency	Candidate	Votes	Pct	Opponent(s)	Votes	Pct	Ballots cast	Majority	Turnout
2018	N41 Gum-Gum	Arunarnsin Taib (WARISAN)	4,710	51.10%	Juslie Ajirol (Sabah UMNO)	4,112	44.61%	9,493	598	76.20%
2018	N41 Gum-Gum	Arunarnsin Taib (WARISAN)	4,710	51.10%	Dahil Masdik (PHRS)	252	2.73%	9,493	598	76.20%
2018	N41 Gum-Gum	Arunarnsin Taib (WARISAN)	4,710	51.10%	Joilin @ Christine Bugung (PKS)	81	0.88%	9,493	598	76.20%
2018	N41 Gum-Gum	Arunarnsin Taib (WARISAN)	4,710	51.10%	Jamaludin Lamba (PPRS)	63	0.68%	9,493	598	76.20%
2020	N50 Gum-Gum	Arunarnsin Taib (WARISAN)	3,140	39.21%	Suhaimi Nasir (Sabah UMNO)	2,871	35.84%	8,009	269	64.21%
2020	N50 Gum-Gum	Arunarnsin Taib (WARISAN)	3,140	39.21%	Yunus Nurdin (IND)	1,690	21.10%	8,009	269	64.21%
2020	N50 Gum-Gum	Arunarnsin Taib (WARISAN)	3,140	39.21%	Undang Tumpong (PCS)	172	2.15%	8,009	269	64.21%
2020	N50 Gum-Gum	Arunarnsin Taib (WARISAN)	3,140	39.21%	Jainudin Berahim (LDP)	113	1.41%	8,009	269	64.21%
2020	N50 Gum-Gum	Arunarnsin Taib (WARISAN)	3,140	39.21%	Riduan Sampai (PPRS)	23	0.29%	8,009	269	64.21%
2025	N50 Gum-Gum	Arunarnsin Taib (WARISAN)	2,997	26.20%	Yunus Nurdin (Sabah BERSATU)	1,894	16.55%	11,727	1,103	60.45%
2025	N50 Gum-Gum	Arunarnsin Taib (WARISAN)	2,997	26.20%	Abdul Said Pimping (PKR)	1,863	16.28%	11,727	1,103	60.45%
2025	N50 Gum-Gum	Arunarnsin Taib (WARISAN)	2,997	26.20%	Salzo Asa (IND)	1,802	15.75%	11,727	1,103	60.45%
2025	N50 Gum-Gum	Arunarnsin Taib (WARISAN)	2,997	26.20%	Peter Jr Naintin (UPKO)	1,568	13.71%	11,727	1,103	60.45%
2025	N50 Gum-Gum	Arunarnsin Taib (WARISAN)	2,997	26.20%	Mohd Yusuf Yoda (IND)	693	6.06%	11,727	1,103	60.45%
2025	N50 Gum-Gum	Arunarnsin Taib (WARISAN)	2,997	26.20%	Asmawi Asa (IND)	321	2.81%	11,727	1,103	60.45%
2025	N50 Gum-Gum	Arunarnsin Taib (WARISAN)	2,997	26.20%	Esnin Satur (IMPIAN)	205	1.79%	11,727	1,103	60.45%
2025	N50 Gum-Gum	Arunarnsin Taib (WARISAN)	2,997	26.20%	Fadly Voon @ Wea (IND)	98	0.86%	11,727	1,103	60.45%

== Honours ==
- Sabah
  - Companion of the Order of Kinabalu (ASDK) (2018)
  - Star of the Order of Kinabalu (BK) (2008)
