= Hiew King Cheu =

Malaysian politician (1952–2024)

Yang Berbahagia Datuk Hiew King Cheu PGDK
- 邱庆洲

Member of the Malaysian Parliament for Kota Kinabalu, Sabah
- In office 2008–2013
- Preceded by: Yee Moh Chai
- Succeeded by: Wong Sze Phin

Member of the Sabah State Legislative Assembly for Luyang
- In office 2013–2018
- Preceded by: Chia Chui Ket
- Succeeded by: Ginger Phoong Jin Zhe

Personal details
- Born: 1 March 1952 Jesselton, Crown Colony of North Borneo
- Died: 15 October 2024 (aged 72) Kota Kinabalu, Sabah, Malaysia
- Party: Parti Gagasan Rakyat Sabah (PGRS) (2019–2024); Malaysian Chinese Association (MCA) (2014–2018); Independent (2013–2014); Democratic Action Party (DAP) (until 2013)
- Other political affiliations: Barisan Nasional (BN) (2014–2019); Pakatan Rakyat (PR) (until 2013)
- Spouse: Julia Thien
- Occupation: Politician

Hiew King Cheu (simplified Chinese: 邱庆洲; traditional Chinese: 邱慶洲; pinyin: Qiū Qìngzhōu; 1 March 1952 – 15 October 2024) was a Malaysian politician. He was a member and deputy president of Parti Gagasan Rakyat Sabah (PGRS) from 2019.

Hiew was the Member of the Sabah State Assembly for the constituency of Luyang, sitting in the assembly for Malaysian Chinese Association (MCA) - Barisan Nasional (BN) after being an independent a while in 2013. From 2008 to 2013 he was the Member of Parliament (MP) for Kota Kinabalu constituency in Sabah, representing the opposition Democratic Action Party (DAP).

Hiew had contested the federal Kota Kinabalu seat in the 2002 by-election and 2004 Malaysian general election losing on each occasion. He won the seat in the 2008 election. In a four-way election, he narrowly defeated Christina Liew of fellow opposition party PKR and Barisan Nasional's Chin Teck Meng. The election was regarded as an unexpected loss by the ruling Barisan Nasional coalition.

Hiew relinquished his federal seat in 2013, instead contesting, and winning, the State Assembly seat of Luyang. In September 2013, he resigned from the DAP to become an independent in the State Assembly due to his defiance of the party in supporting Lajim Ukin over Wilfred Bumburing to be the leader of the opposition in the assembly.

Hiew joined the Malaysian Chinese Association in 2014 after an invitation by the party in June that year. In 2017 while in MCA, he received the datukship award from Sabah governor Juhar Mahiruddin Up to 2018 and the fall of Barisan Nasional governments, he was a member in Sabah's MCA, the second largest BN component.

In 2019, Hiew had joined Parti Gagasan Rakyat Sabah (PGRS) and was elected its deputy president.

Hiew died from lung cancer in Kota Kinabalu, on 15 October 2024, at the age of 72.

== Election results ==
Parliament of Malaysia
Year	Constituency	Candidate	Votes	Pct	Opponent(s)	Votes	Pct	Ballots cast	Majority	Turnout
2002	P150 Gaya	Hiew King Cheu (DAP)	3,716	16.81%	Liew Teck Chan (SAPP)	15,639	70.76%	22,100	11,923	44.71%
2002	P150 Gaya	Hiew King Cheu (DAP)	3,716	16.81%	Christina Liew (keADILan)	2,613	11.82%	22,100	11,923	44.71%
2004	P172 Kota Kinabalu	Hiew King Cheu (DAP)	5,187	20.68%	Yee Moh Chai (PBS)	15,993	63.77%	25,078	10,806	58.16%
2004	P172 Kota Kinabalu	Hiew King Cheu (DAP)	5,187	20.68%	Christina Liew (PKR)	3,492	13.92%	25,078	10,806	58.16%
2008	P172 Kota Kinabalu	Hiew King Cheu (DAP)	9,464	33.78%	Christina Liew (PKR)	9,358	33.40%	28,017	106	64.09%
2008	P172 Kota Kinabalu	Hiew King Cheu (DAP)	9,464	33.78%	Chin Tek Ming (PBS)	8,420	30.05%	28,017	106	64.09%
2008	P172 Kota Kinabalu	Hiew King Cheu (DAP)	9,464	33.78%	Kong Yu Kiong (IND)	341	1.22%	28,017	106	64.09%

Sabah State Legislative Assembly
Year	Constituency	Candidate	Votes	Pct.	Opponent(s)	Votes	Pct.	Ballots cast	Majority	Turnout
2013	N16 Luyang	Hiew King Cheu (DAP)	11,213	70.78%	Agnes Shim Tshin Nyuk (MCA)	2,537	16.02%	15,841	8,676	78.70%
2013	N16 Luyang	Hiew King Cheu (DAP)	11,213	70.78%	Melanie Chia Chui Ket (SAPP)	1,694	10.69%	15,841	8,676	78.70%
2013	N16 Luyang	Hiew King Cheu (DAP)	11,213	70.78%	Jafery Jomion (STAR)	259	1.63%	15,841	8,676	78.70%
2020	N21 Luyang	Hiew King Cheu (PGRS)	62	0.36%	Phoong Jin Zhe (DAP)	15,510	89.62%	17,306	14,521	66.45%
2020	N21 Luyang	Hiew King Cheu (PGRS)	62	0.36%	Gee Tien Siong (SAPP)	989	5.71%	17,306	14,521	66.45%
2020	N21 Luyang	Hiew King Cheu (PGRS)	62	0.36%	Anthony Linggian (LDP)	279	1.61%	17,306	14,521	66.45%
2020	N21 Luyang	Hiew King Cheu (PGRS)	62	0.36%	Wilson Chang Khai Sim (PCS)	1.61	1.10%	17,306	14,521	66.45%
2020	N21 Luyang	Hiew King Cheu (PGRS)	62	0.36%	Chin Ling Ling (IND)	97	0.56%	17,306	14,521	66.45%

== Honours ==
=== Honours of Malaysia ===
- Sabah
  - Commander of the Order of Kinabalu (PGDK) – Datuk (2017)
