= Mohamad Hamsan Awang Supain =

Malaysian politician (1960–2025)

Yang Berbahagia Datuk Mohamad Hamsan Awang Supain PGDK
- محمد همسان أواڠ سڤيان

State Assistant Minister of Housing and Local Government of Sabah
- In office 8 October 2020 – 19 January 2025 Serving with Isnin Aliasnih
- Governor: Juhar Mahiruddin (2020–2025); Musa Aman (2025)
- Chief Minister: Hajiji Noor
- Minister: Masidi Manjun (2020–2023); Joachim Gunsalam (2023–2025)
- Preceded by: George Hiew Vun Zin
- Succeeded by: Maijol Mahap & Fairuz Renddan
- Constituency: Sungai Sibuga

Member of the Sabah State Legislative Assembly for Sungai Sibuga
- In office 26 September 2020 – 19 January 2025
- Preceded by: Musa Aman (BN–UMNO)
- Succeeded by: Nurulalsah Hassan Alban (WARISAN)
- Majority: 1,538 (2020)

Faction represented in the Sabah State Legislative Assembly
- 2020–2025: Barisan Nasional

Personal details
- Born: Mohamad Hamsan bin Awang Supain; 6 October 1960 Sandakan, Crown Colony of North Borneo (now Sabah, Malaysia)
- Died: 19 January 2025 (aged 64) Kota Kinabalu, Sabah, Malaysia
- Cause of death: Kidney failure
- Resting place: Kg Bintang Batu Muslim Cemetery, Rancangan Sungai Manila settlement, Sandakan, Sabah, Malaysia
- Citizenship: Malaysia
- Party: United Malays National Organisation of Sabah (Sabah UMNO)
- Other political affiliations: Barisan Nasional (BN)
- Spouse: Kalsom Abd Aziz
- Relations: Mohamad Wahidan (Younger brother); Berahim Nasip (Brother-in-law); Mohamad Hanif Ayub (Son-in-law)
- Children: 1 son: Hamezan (died on 28 August 2022); 4 daughters: Nurhafizah Fatin, Hazwanee, Hazeeqah Nadiah and Ameerah Izzati
- Occupation: Politician

Mohamad Hamsan bin Awang Supain (6 October 1960 – 19 January 2025) was a Malaysian politician who served as the State Assistant Minister of Housing and Local Government of Sabah in the Gabungan Rakyat Sabah (GRS) state administration under Chief Minister Hajiji Noor and Ministers Masidi Manjun and Joachim Gunsalam from October 2020 as well as Member of the Sabah State Legislative Assembly (MLA) for Sungai Sibuga from September 2020 to his death in office in January 2025. He was a member of the United Malays National Organisation of Sabah (Sabah UMNO), a branch of a component party of the Barisan Nasional (BN) coalition. He was also the Secretary of Sandakan Municipal Council (MPS) as well as an electoral returning officer in his capacity as a civil servant prior to joining full-time politics.

== Death ==
On 19 January 2025, Mohamad Hamsan died from kidney failure at KPJ Sabah Specialist Hospital, Kota Kinabalu, Sabah, Malaysia at the age of 65.

== Election results ==
Sabah State Legislative Assembly
| Year | Constituency | Candidate | Votes | Pct | Opponent(s) | Votes | Pct | Ballots cast | Majority | Turnout |
|---|---|---|---|---|---|---|---|---|---|---|
| 2020 | N52 Sungai Sibuga | Mohamad Hamsan Awang Supain (UMNO) | 7,545 | 52.70% | Armani Mahiruddin (WARISAN) | 6,007 | 41.95% | 14,318 | 1,538 | 61.43% |
| 2020 | N52 Sungai Sibuga | Mohamad Hamsan Awang Supain (UMNO) | 7,545 | 52.70% | Irawanshah Mustapa (PCS) | 526 | 3.67% | 14,318 | 1,538 | 61.43% |
| 2020 | N52 Sungai Sibuga | Mohamad Hamsan Awang Supain (UMNO) | 7,545 | 52.70% | Kamellia Hasan (LDP) | 126 | 0.88% | 14,318 | 1,538 | 61.43% |
| 2020 | N52 Sungai Sibuga | Mohamad Hamsan Awang Supain (UMNO) | 7,545 | 52.70% | Ag Damit Pg Abd Razak (USNO Baru) | 114 | 0.80% | 14,318 | 1,538 | 61.43% |

== Honours ==
- Sabah
  - Commander of the Order of Kinabalu (PGDK) – Datuk (2022)
  - Companion of the Order of Kinabalu (ASDK) (2019)
  - Member of the Order of Kinabalu (ADK) (2011)
