= Chong Kah Kiat =

Malaysian politician

Yang Berbahagia Tan Sri Datuk Seri Panglima Chong Kah Kiat PSM SPDK
- 章家傑

Minister in the Prime Minister's Department
- In office 4 May 1995 – 12 November 1996
- Monarch: Ja'afar
- Prime Minister: Mahathir Mohamad
- Preceded by: Bernard Giluk Dompok
- Succeeded by: Siti Zaharah Sulaiman
- Constituency: Senator

13th Chief Minister of Sabah
- In office 27 March 2001 – 27 March 2003
- Governor: Sakaran Dandai; Ahmadshah Abdullah
- Deputy: Lajim Ukin; Wences Angang; Tham Nyip Shen
- Preceded by: Osu Sukam
- Succeeded by: Musa Aman

President of the Liberal Democratic Party
- In office 1991–2006
- Preceded by: Hiew Min Kong
- Succeeded by: Liew Vui Keong

Personal details
- Born: Chong Kah Kiat; 3 June 1947 (age 79) Kudat, Crown Colony of North Borneo (now Sabah, Malaysia)
- Party: Sabah People's United Front (BERJAYA); Liberal Democratic Party (LDP)
- Spouse(s): Ivy Fam-Chong (born 1962, m. 1983)

Chong Kah Kiat (Chinese: 章家傑; pinyin: Zhāng Jiājié; Pha̍k-fa-sṳ: Chhong Gá-khíet) (born 3 June 1947) is a Malaysian politician of Chinese descent who served as Minister in the Prime Minister's Department from May 1995 to November 1996, 13th Chief Minister of Sabah from March 2001 to March 2003 and President of the Liberal Democratic Party (LDP) from 1991 to 2006.

== History in politics ==
Born in Kudat, Chong was a graduate of New Zealand's Victoria University of Wellington, earning a Master of Laws (LL.B.) (First Class) in 1975 and subsequently practising law at the legal firm of Shelley Yap, Leong, Tseu, Chong, Chia & Co. (now known as Shelley Yap) in Kota Kinabalu.

He contested and won the Kudat seat on a BERJAYA ticket in the March 1981 state election and was appointed Assistant Minister to the Chief Minister of Sabah the following year. He held the post until April 1985 when he lost the seat to Wong Phin Chung of United Sabah Party (PBS).

In March 1987, he became a member of the Berjaya Supreme Council but later left the party when it became clear that it was losing ground.

Chong and several Chinese leaders founded the LDP in 1989 and was made its pro-tem secretary general. Then in 1991, he became the party's president. He did not contest the 1994 state election but a year later was appointed Senator in the Dewan Negara and subsequently included in the Cabinet of Malaysia as one of the Ministers in the Prime Minister's Department representing East Malaysia, Sabah state as well as the dominant minority Chinese community, in which he served in this portfolio until 1996. He then quit federal politics in March 1999 to contest the state polls. This time, he won back his traditional stronghold of Kudat, and was appointed as state minister of Tourism, Environment, Science and Technology.

Chong became the 13th Chief Minister of Sabah in 2001 representing the Chinese community in a rotation system mooted by former Prime Minister Dr. Mahathir Mohamad in 1994.

When Musa Aman took over the helm of the state government in 2003, Chong was appointed Deputy Chief Minister as well as the person in charge of the tourism, culture, and environment portfolio. It was then the rotation system was scrapped and from then onwards, the Chief Minister post was held by the United Malays National Organisation until the 2018 Sabah state election.

In April 2007, Chong resigned from the Deputy Chief Minister as well as Tourism, Culture and Environment Minister's post under Musa Aman's cabinet, citing matters of principle but remained as a backbencher MLA until his retirement from politics due to the 2008 general elections.

== Election results ==
Sabah State Legislative Assembly
Year	Constituency	Candidate	Votes	Pct	Opponent(s)	Votes	Pct	Ballots cast	Majority	Turnout
1986	N02 Kudat, P134 Marudu	Chong Kah Kiat (BERJAYA)	3,489	44.20%	Wong Phin Chung (PBS)	4,380	55.48%	7,973	891	76.94%
1986	N02 Kudat, P134 Marudu	Chong Kah Kiat (BERJAYA)	3,489	44.20%	Dingle Anthony (IND)	25	0.32%	7,973	891	76.94%
1990	N02 Kudat, P134 Marudu	Chong Kah Kiat (LDP)	4,043	43.25%	Wong Phin Chung (PBS)	4,667	49.92%	9.459	624	75.01%
1990	N02 Kudat, P134 Marudu	Chong Kah Kiat (LDP)	4,043	43.25%	Yong Sze Kiun (BERJAYA)	309	3.31%	9.459	624	75.01%
1990	N02 Kudat, P134 Marudu	Chong Kah Kiat (LDP)	4,043	43.25%	Lee Tain Soong (PRS)	127	1.36%	9.459	624	75.01%
1990	N02 Kudat, P134 Marudu	Chong Kah Kiat (LDP)	4,043	43.25%	Chong Jan Fah (DAP)	94	1.01%	9.459	624	75.01%
1990	N02 Kudat, P134 Marudu	Chong Kah Kiat (LDP)	4,043	43.25%	Gurahman Lolong (IND)	60	0.64%	9.459	624	75.01%
1990	N02 Kudat, P134 Marudu	Chong Kah Kiat (LDP)	4,043	43.25%	Wiilie Chong Kui Shen (AKAR)	48	0.51%	9.459	624	75.01%
1999	N02 Kudat, P146 Marudu	Chong Kah Kiat (LDP)	6,935	53.48%	Kong Hong Ming (PBS)	5,447	42.00%	13,080	1,488	72.76%
1999	N02 Kudat, P146 Marudu	Chong Kah Kiat (LDP)	6,935	53.48%	Jimmy Wong Sze Phin (AKAR)	481	3.71%	13,080	1,488	72.76%
1999	N02 Kudat, P146 Marudu	Chong Kah Kiat (LDP)	6,935	53.48%	Yong Sze Kiun (SETIA)	105	0.81%	13,080	1,488	72.76%
2004	N02 Tanjong Kapor, P167 Kudat	Chong Kah Kiat (LDP)	6,234	49.74%	Omar Mohd Aji (IND)	3,241	25.86%	12,865	2,993	69.40%
2004	N02 Tanjong Kapor, P167 Kudat	Chong Kah Kiat (LDP)	6,234	49.74%	Kong Hong Ming (IND)	1,877	14.98%	12,865	2,993	69.40%
2004	N02 Tanjong Kapor, P167 Kudat	Chong Kah Kiat (LDP)	6,234	49.74%	Wong Phin Chung (IND)	1,035	8.26%	12,865	2,993	69.40%
2004	N02 Tanjong Kapor, P167 Kudat	Chong Kah Kiat (LDP)	6,234	49.74%	Santong Angkap (BERSEKUTU)	52	0.41%	12,865	2,993	69.40%
2004	N02 Tanjong Kapor, P167 Kudat	Chong Kah Kiat (LDP)	6,234	49.74%	Alexandra Anthony (keADILan)	50	0.40%	12,865	2,993	69.40%
2004	N02 Tanjong Kapor, P167 Kudat	Chong Kah Kiat (LDP)	6,234	49.74%	Bensali Ebrahim (PASOK)	44	0.35%	12,865	2,993	69.40%
2020	N18 Inanam, P171 Sepanggar	Chong Kah Kiat (LDP)	1,606	9.51%	Peto Galim (PKR)	8,586	50.92%	16,890	5,638	64.87%
2020	N18 Inanam, P171 Sepanggar	Chong Kah Kiat (LDP)	1,606	9.51%	William Majinbon (PBS)	2,948	17.38%	16,890	5,638	64.87%
2020	N18 Inanam, P171 Sepanggar	Chong Kah Kiat (LDP)	1,606	9.51%	Kenny Chua Teck Ho (IND)	2,346	13.89%	16,890	5,638	64.87%
2020	N18 Inanam, P171 Sepanggar	Chong Kah Kiat (LDP)	1,606	9.51%	Francis Goh Fah Shun (GAGASAN)	362	2.14%	16,890	5,638	64.87%
2020	N18 Inanam, P171 Sepanggar	Chong Kah Kiat (LDP)	1,606	9.51%	How Regina Lim (PCS)	291	1.72%	16,890	5,638	64.87%
2020	N18 Inanam, P171 Sepanggar	Chong Kah Kiat (LDP)	1,606	9.51%	Achmad Noorasyrul Noortaip (IND)	286	1.69%	16,890	5,638	64.87%
2020	N18 Inanam, P171 Sepanggar	Chong Kah Kiat (LDP)	1,606	9.51%	Terence Tsen Kim Fatt (PKAN)	255	1.51%	16,890	5,638	64.87%
2020	N18 Inanam, P171 Sepanggar	Chong Kah Kiat (LDP)	1,606	9.51%	Mohd Hardy Abdullah (USNO Baru)	156	0.92%	16,890	5,638	64.87%
2020	N18 Inanam, P171 Sepanggar	Chong Kah Kiat (LDP)	1,606	9.51%	George Ngui (IND)	54	0.32%	16,890	5,638	64.87%

== Honours ==
=== Honours of Malaysia ===
- Malaysia
  - Commander of the Order of Loyalty to the Crown of Malaysia (PSM) – Tan Sri (2004)
  - Companion of the Order of Loyalty to the Crown of Malaysia (JSM) (1994)
- Sabah
  - Grand Commander of the Order of Kinabalu (SPDK) – Datuk Seri Panglima (2022)
  - Commander of the Order of Kinabalu (PGDK) – Datuk (1996)

== References and notes ==
Political offices
Preceded by Osu Sukam	Chief Minister of Sabah; 2001–2003	Succeeded by Musa Aman
