= Sabah People's Front =

Sabah People's Front Barisan Rakyat Sabah SPF
- Abbreviation: SPF
- Founder: Berman Angkap
- Founded: 2010
- Legalised: 8 December 2010
- Dissolved: 2012
- Preceded by: Barisan Rakyat Sabah Bersekutu (BERSEKUTU)
- Succeeded by: Sarawak Workers Party (SWP); Sabah Peace Party (SPP)
- Headquarters: Kota Kinabalu, Sabah
- Colours: Blue, green, red, yellow
- Dewan Negara: 0 / 70
- Dewan Rakyat: 0 / 222
- Sabah State Legislative Assembly: 0 / 60

The Sabah People's Front (SPF) or in Malay: Barisan Rakyat Sabah is a political party in Malaysia formed by former president of Federated Sabah People's Front (BERSEKUTU), Berman Angkap on 8 December 2010 after its dissolution.

SPF's new president Berman Angkap announced that SPF was formed to fulfill the wishes of the peoples of Sabah to recover the rights of the state.

However, in 2012, the SPF was taken over by some former Sarawak Peoples' Party (PRS) members led by dissident leader Sng Chee Hua and turned into the new Sarawak Workers Party (SWP).

In aftermath of the 2013 Malaysian general election (GE13), the SPF party former president Berman Angkap formed and became the president of another new Parti Damai Sabah or Sabah Peace Party (SPP) as its successor, which had contested in the 2020 Sabah state election.

== See also ==
- Politics of Malaysia
- List of political parties in Malaysia
