= Sabah Peace Party =

Sabah Peace Party Parti Damai Sabah (SPP)
- Abbreviation: SPP
- Leader: Berman Angkap
- Founded: 28 August 2013
- Preceded by: Sabah People's Front (SPF)
- Headquarters: Sabah, Malaysia
- Ideology: Nationalism; Regionalism
- Colours: Green, red and yellow

Sabah Peace Party or Malay: Parti Damai Sabah (SPP) is a Sabah-based-opposition party in Malaysia formed after the 2013 Malaysian general election. Following its establishment, the party declared itself to not be on the side of either the ruling Barisan Nasional (BN) or the opposition then. The multi-racial party was formed and led by Berman Angkap, who is also both Federated Sabah People's Front (BERSEKUTU) and Sabah People's Front (SPF) former founding presidents, had declared it represents the rights and interests of the people and the state of Sabah.

== Election results ==
Sabah State Legislative Assembly
Election	Votes		Seats			Position	Status
Election	Count	%	Result	Won / contested	+/–	Position	Status
2018	Did not contest						No seats
2020	Did not contest						No seats
2025	429	0.0	0 / 73	0 / 5	Steady	17th	No seats

== See also ==
- Politics of Malaysia
- List of political parties in Malaysia
