= Juslie Ajirol =

Malaysian politician

Yang Berbahagia Datuk Juslie Ajirol PGDK ASDK
- جوسلي أجيرول

Member of the Malaysian Parliament for Libaran
- In office 29 November 1999 – 9 May 2018
- Preceded by: Akbarkhan Abdulrahman (BN–UMNO)
- Succeeded by: Zakaria Edris (BN–UMNO)

Personal details
- Born: 15 October 1953 (age 72) Crown Colony of North Borneo
- Party: United Malays National Organisation (-2018); Gagasan Rakyat Sabah Party (since 2023)
- Other political affiliations: Barisan Nasional (-2018); Gabungan Rakyat Sabah (since 2022)
- Occupation: Politician

Juslie bin Ajirol (born 15 October 1953) is a Malaysian politician. He was the former Member of the Parliament of Malaysia for the Libaran constituency in Sabah, formerly representing the United Malays National Organisation (UMNO) in the governing Barisan Nasional (BN) coalition from 1999 until 2018. Since 2023, He is the Leader of N.50 Gum Gum Branch Gagasan Rakyat Sabah Party after joining the local party in April 2023.

== Election results ==
Parliament of Malaysia
Year	Constituency	Candidate	Votes	Pct	Opponent(s)	Votes	Pct	Ballots cast	Majority	Turnout
1999	P160 Libaran	Juslie Ajirol (UMNO)	11,303	69.36%	Murphy Nazir (PKR)	4,992	30.64%	16,711	6,311	48.17%
2004	P184 Libaran	Juslie Ajirol (UMNO)	13,140	84.17%	Raj Munni Sabu (PKR)	2,471	15.83%	16,484	10,669	61.31%
2008	P184 Libaran	Juslie Ajirol (UMNO)	13,668	69.01%	Ahmad Thamrin (PKR)	6,139	30.99%	20,536	7,529	65.33%
2013	P184 Libaran	Juslie Ajirol (UMNO)	19,584	62.56%	Mohd Serman Hassnar (PKR)	7,998	25.55%	32,119	11,586	80.76%
2013	P184 Libaran	Juslie Ajirol (UMNO)	19,584	62.56%	Sahar Saka (IND)	3,219	10.28%	32,119	11,586	80.76%
2013	P184 Libaran	Juslie Ajirol (UMNO)	19,584	62.56%	Rosnah Unsari (STAR)	502	1.60%	32,119	11,586	80.76%

== Honours ==
- Sabah
  - Commander of the Order of Kinabalu (PGDK) – Datuk (2002)
  - Companion of the Order of Kinabalu (ASDK) (2000)
