= Musa Aman =

Malaysian politician

Tuan Yang Terutama Tun Datuk Seri Panglima Musa Aman SMN SPDK SPMB PSM DGSM DA PGDK JMN JP
- موسى أمان
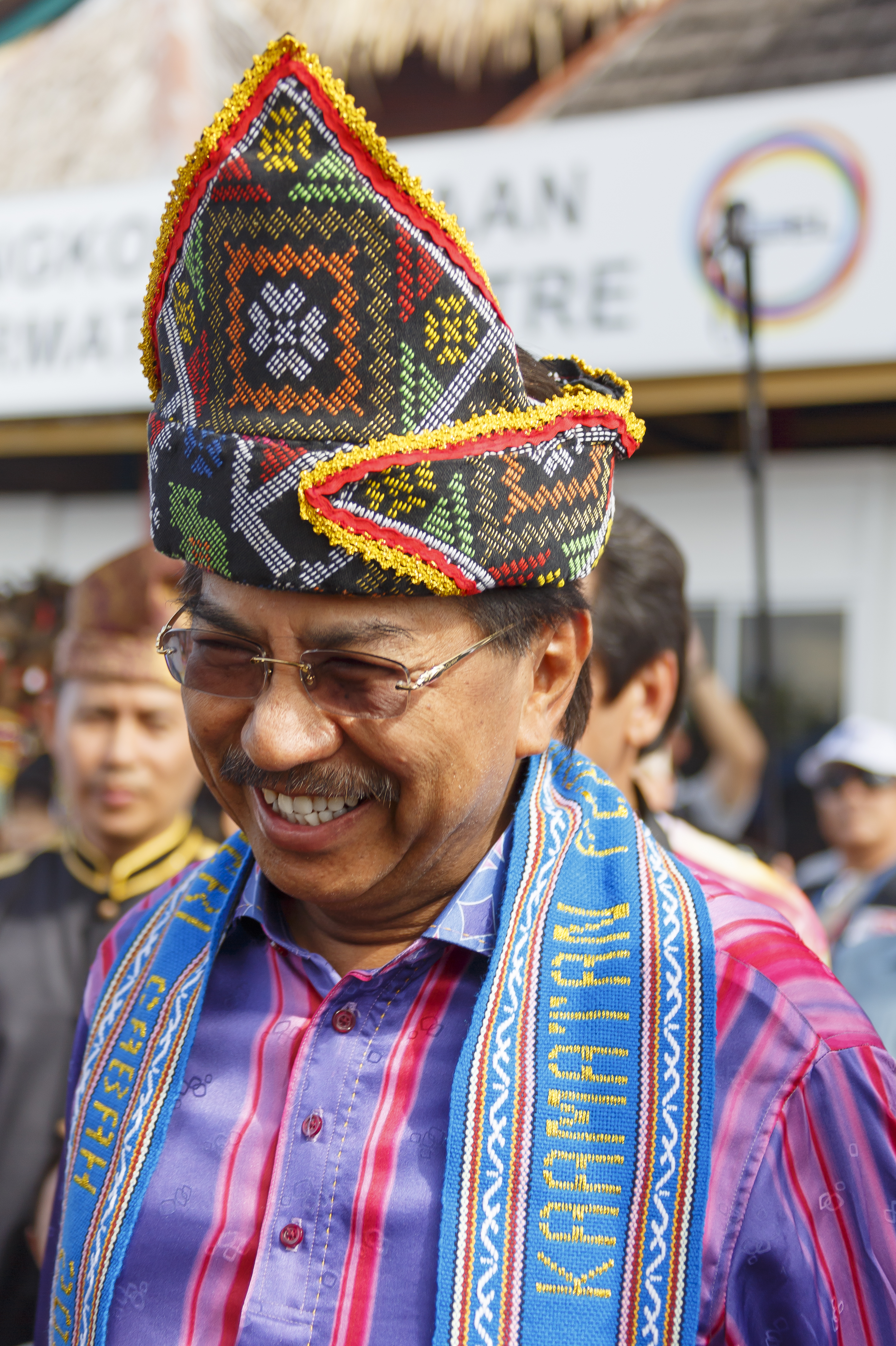

11th Yang di-Pertua Negeri of Sabah
- Incumbent
- Assumed office 1 January 2025
- Chief Minister: Hajiji Noor
- Preceded by: Juhar Mahiruddin

14th Chief Minister of Sabah
- In office 27 March 2003 – 12 May 2018
- Governor: Ahmadshah Abdullah (2003–2010); Juhar Mahiruddin (2011–2018)
- Deputy: Wences Angang (2003–2004); Tham Nyip Shen (2003–2004); Lajim Ukin (2003–2004); Joseph Pairin Kitingan (2004–2018); Chong Kah Kiat (2004–2007); Yahya Hussin (2004–2018); Peter Pang En Yin (2008–2011); Yee Moh Chai (2011–2013); Raymond Tan Shu Kiah (2013–2018); Jeffrey Kitingan (11–12 May 2018); Hajiji Noor (11–12 May 2018); Masidi Manjun (11–12 May 2018)
- Preceded by: Chong Kah Kiat
- Succeeded by: Shafie Apdal

Member of the Sabah State Legislative Assembly for Sungai Sibuga
- In office 19 February 1994 – 26 September 2020
- Preceded by: Thien Fui Yun (PBS)
- Succeeded by: Mohamad Hamsan Awang Supain (BN–Sabah UMNO)
- Majority: 3,708 (1994); 4,034 (1999); 6,670 (2004); 7,657 (2008); 11,569 (2013); 2,184 (2018)

Ministerial roles (Sabah)
- 1999–2002: Minister in the Chief Minister's Department
- 2002–2018: Minister of Finance

Faction represented in Sabah State Legislative Assembly
- 1994–2020: Barisan Nasional

Personal details
- Born: Musa bin Aman; 30 March 1951 (age 75) Beaufort, North Borneo
- Citizenship: Malaysian
- Party: United Sabah National Organisation (USNO) (until 1990); United Malays National Organisation of Sabah (Sabah UMNO) (since 1990)
- Other political affiliations: Barisan Nasional (BN) (since 1990)
- Spouse: Faridah Tussin
- Relations: Arifin Arif (son-in-law); Anifah Aman (younger brother); Annuar Ayub (nephew)
- Children: 4 (including Yamani Hafez Musa)
- Education: Universiti Teknologi Mara (BBA); Edith Cowan University (MBA)

Musa bin Aman (Jawi: موسى بن حاج أمان; born 30 March 1951) is a Malaysian politician who has served as the 11th Yang di-Pertua Negeri of Sabah since January 2025. He served as the 14th Chief Minister of Sabah from March 2003 to May 2018, State Minister of Finance of Sabah from 2002 to May 2018, State Minister in the Chief Minister's Department of Sabah from 1999 to 2002 and Member of the Sabah State Legislative Assembly (MLA) for Sungai Sibuga from February 1994 to September 2020. He was also the State Chairman of Barisan Nasional (BN) and United Malays National Organisation (UMNO) of Sabah. He is the longest-serving Chief Minister of Sabah, holding the position for 15 years and is the older half brother of Anifah Aman, Senator, Special Advisor to the Chief Minister of Sabah on International Relations and Foreign Investments and President of the Love Sabah Party (PCS).

== Early life and education ==
Musa's mother is a Dusun from Keningau District, while his ancestors through his father's lineage are of mixed Pakistani and Bruneian Malay descent from Beaufort District. He received his primary education in St. Paul's Anglican primary school, Beaufort and later attended Sabah College and All Saints Secondary School, both in Kota Kinabalu for his secondary education. He then pursued his tertiary education in Universiti Teknologi Mara or UiTM (formerly known as Institut Teknologi Mara, ITM) for his bachelor's degree in Business Administration and later obtained a Master of Business Administration (MBA) degree from Edith Cowan University, Perth, Australia.

He was interested in the world of business since his primary school days. In 1973, he pursue his business interests in Sandakan. He later put Syarikat Musman Holdings Sdn Bhd under his stewardship. He was the chairman for City Finance Berhad from 1983 until 1995. He later became the chief executive of Innoprise Corporation in 1995 and also the chairman for Sabah Softwood Berhad (under Innoprise Corporation) in the same year.

== Political career ==
=== Early political career ===
He debuted in the 1990 Sabah state election and competed for the Sugut seat but lost to the incumbent. On 8 March 1992, after USNO had merged into UMNO, he contested and won the Jambongan UMNO division chief's post (now known as Libaran division) and was appointed as Sabah Barisan Nasional (BN) treasurer eight days later. On 7 March 1995, a year after BN came to power in Sabah, Musa became the director of Sabah Foundation (Yayasan Sabah), a Sabah statutory body. In March 1999 he resigned as the Sabah Foundation Director to contest in the state elections and defend the Sungai Sibuga State Legislative Assembly seat, defeating Ramli Noordin of Parti Bersatu Sabah (PBS) by 4,034 majority votes, the highest majority among the 24 seats contested by UMNO. He moved up further in his political career when he was appointed Minister in the Chief Minister's Department under Datuk Osu Sukam in 1999. On 27 March 2001, he became the Finance Minister in Chief Minister Chong Kah Kiat's cabinet. On 28 September 2001, Musa replaced Osu Sukam as the Sabah UMNO Liaison Committee chairman, which paved the way for him to be the Chief Minister.

=== Appointment as chief minister ===
Musa took over the post of chief minister from Chong Kah Kiat (LDP) on 27 March 2003. His appointment as Chief Minister marks the end of the rotation system used in Sabah whereby the Chief Minister post is rotated every two years among the three main ethnoreligious groups in Sabah: Christian Bumiputras, Muslim Bumiputras, and the Chinese.

=== Economic policy ===
Soon after taking his oath of office as Chief Minister, Musa Aman outlined his agenda for the state. He had set his priorities on agriculture, tourism and manufacturing, putting them in what he calls the state's 'Halatuju' development framework, and supporting them by placing human resource development high on his agenda. To support the first pillar of his 'Halatuju' campaign, tourism, a commitment of RM1.4 billion in federal funds was secured towards the building of a new Kota Kinabalu airport terminal, which was completed in 2008, ahead of schedule. A part of the old Kota Kinabalu port with warehouse facilities dating back to the early 1900s was transformed into Jesselton Point, a modern port with a high-class ferry terminal and other facilities. Under Musa tourism registered significant growth; Tourist arrivals to Sabah grew from 1.25 million arrivals in 2003 to nearly 2.1 million arrivals in 2006. The growth justified a further capital input into the tourism sector, with over RM1 billion made available via Special Tourism Fund of RM400 million for small projects and RM700 million for larger projects. To support the second pillar—agriculture—the state government broke new ground in combining agriculture and manufacturing sectors into one by promoting bio-agriculture. The establishment of Palm Oil Industrial Clusters (POIC) is an example of bio-agriculture that promises to move the state's agricultural products up the value chain in the commodity markets. To support the third pillar, manufacturing, in 2006 a total of 92 manufacturing projects were granted approval in the state with a projected total investment value of RM4.9 billion.

== Controversy ==
=== Timber corruption scandal, 2012 ===
In April 2012, Musa was linked to a timber corruption scandal as per the leaked Malaysian Anti-Corruption Commission (MACC) documents published by the website Sarawak Report. Musa was accused of having close relationship with Sabah timber trader Michael Chia, where the latter was detained in Hong Kong in 2008 for trying to smuggle S$16 million (RM40 million) to Musa. Sarawak Report further revealed that Chia was responsible for Musa's sons expenses in Australia. Anifah Aman, brother of Musa, was also accused of being a secret beneficiary of lucrative timber licenses. Abdul Gani Patail, the Malaysian Attorney-General who is close to Musa family, was alleged to have blocked the MACC investigation into this case. However, Musa denied his link with Chia, while accusing Sarawak Report for defaming him. On 11 October 2012, in a written reply to the Parliament, Minister in the Prime Minister's Department Mohamed Nazri Abdul Aziz said Musa has been cleared of the alleged RM40 million kickbacks for timber licences by the Attorney-General's Chambers as "the funds were contributions to the Sabah Umno liaison body and not for the personal use of the chief minister". He also said that the Hong Kong's Independent Commission Against Corruption (ICAC) and Malaysian Attorney-General chamber has cleared Musa of corruption after the MACC has provided information in this case. Malaysian Prime Minister Najib Razak refused to disclose the source of the political donation but he insisted that the money was funded through legitimate channels.

In response to the reply by Najib, Sarawak Report released another set of documents on 14 October which pointed the donors to Sabah and Sarawak timber tycoons. On 22 October, Nazri said that Chia was never arrested and the S$16 million was actually frozen in an investment account in Hong Kong. This money was later cleared to be transferred to Swiss bank. As on 25 October, Hong Kong's ICAC refused to disclose any details regarding the probe which reportedly cleared Musa Aman from corruption charges. On 1 November, People's Justice Party (PKR) leaders and Sarawak Report revealed that Nazri's son was given American Hummer H2 by Chia back in March 2011. This revelation raises the possible questions of conflict of interest between Nazri and Chia. However, Nazri sees no problem with the ownership of the Hummer by his son. Nazri also said that he just merely read out the statement from MACC that has cleared Musa from corruption and he insisted that he has not influenced MACC in handling the Musa Aman case.

In April 2013, Reuters validated that the documents released by Sarawak Report are indeed genuine. Two of the timber firms confirmed with Reuters that the money was transferred to secure the logging contracts. MACC officials also told Reuters that the documents are authentic and Musa Aman was the focus of the investigation. On 27 February 2014, Michael Chia was convicted to 1-year jail sentence for misleading Datuk Agus Hassan into logging business by claiming that it was meant for UMNO's political donation in 2004.

=== Allegation of corruption during 2018 general election ===
In the lead-up to the 2018 Malaysian general election, Musa was one of seven MPs from the ruling BN coalition accused by electoral watchdog Bersih of using "bribery" in an attempt to "unduly influence voters" in his constituency. He was criticised for handing out 155 motorcycles to various entrepreneurs in Sandakan, in what was widely seen as an attempt to wrest the marginal seat from the opposition Democratic Action Party (DAP). The DAP candidate had won the seat by a margin of 4% in the 2013 general election.

=== 2018 Sabah state constitutional crisis, refusal to step down as Chief Minister and disappearance ===
Also during the 2018 Sabah state election, Musa coalition party of BN are tied up with 29-29 seats with Sabah Heritage Party (WARISAN) led by Shafie Apdal together with the coalition of Pakatan Harapan (PH). Jeffrey Kitingan with his party of Homeland Solidarity Party (STAR) under the United Sabah Alliance (USA) which are not aligned from either the two sides, has won two seats in the election and subsequently emerged as the decision maker for the formation of a state government from the two sides. Jeffrey then decide to team up with the BN to form coalition state government with him appointed as a Deputy Chief Minister while Musa to become the Chief Minister for another 5 years under the new coalition government. However, situation change when six seats assemblymen from the BN allied parties of United Pasokmomogun Kadazandusun Murut Organisation (UPKO) and United Sabah People's Party (PBRS) switched their allegiance to WARISAN, giving Shafie an advantage with 35 seats which is sufficient to establish a valid state government. Earlier, Musa had already sworn in as Chief Minister following the help of two seats from STAR. This situation left Sabah with two ruling Chief Ministers, the second in its history since the dispute between PBS and USNO in the 1980s. The results of this events sparks a constitutional crisis in Sabah, and the need to review and change the current constitution so as to curb the "allegiance switching" of assemblymen, after the swearing-in ceremony of the chief minister. Another four seats assemblymen from BN allied parties of UMNO and UPKO switching their allegiance to WARISAN on 13 May 2018. The Yang di-Pertua Negeri (TYT) Juhar Mahiruddin also had requested for Musa to step down, despite Musa still stressing that he still the rightful Chief Minister of Sabah. Nevertheless, Musa was issued a letter from the TYT that he is no longer the Chief Minister effective from 12 May 2018 that was delivered into his residence on 14 May 2018.

Musa then filed a suit through his lawyer to both Juhar and Shafie, seeking a declaration that he is and remains the lawful Chief Minister and that the swearing in of Shafie within 24 hours lapse is unconstitutional. Over an alleged threat against Juhar, the TYT subsequently make a police report. Police began to search him in both of his residence in Kota Kinabalu and Sandakan but only found the house has been abandoned with several unnamed sources stating that he had left overseas (before he was blacklisted) through land road towards Brunei before taking a flight to Singapore en route to London in the United Kingdom. His brother Anifah Aman and his son Yamani Hafez Musa was then approached by media to know the whereabouts of Musa but both has explained they were unaware of his recent presence. Through a statement made by his legal counsel Zahir Shah, Musa denies making a "criminal intimidation" towards the TYT. On 7 November 2018, the high court in Kota Kinabalu decided that Shafie remained the legitimate Chief Minister of Sabah and dismissed the suit made by Musa who earlier claimed his dismissal as chief minister was illegal and against the state constitution.

On 30 May 2018, a video published by a Malaysian living in the United Kingdom circulating in social media of Facebook, featuring a man with a cap resembling Musa seen at St Pancras railway station in London. Malaysian police said they already aware of the video and are currently investigating the matter. The Malaysian Immigration Department has said they have no record of Musa leaving Malaysia, adding that "Musa has been blacklisted by the department and if he left the country through illegal routes, he have violated the country’s laws". Malaysian Inspector-General of Police (IGP) Mohamad Fuzi Harun also revealed that Musa was believed to have made Brunei as transit before slipping out of the country. Responding to the claim, Musa legal counsel Zahir explained that "he is currently seeking long overdue medical treatment" and defending that "his travels have always been via proper immigration channels". Around the same time, his official Twitter account are also being suddenly re-activated. On 6 June, Musa withdrawn his previous suit while making a new summons that would not require his presence in court with his another lawyer Tengku Fuad Tengku Ahmad claimed "the new suit could be decided entirely using documents and submissions, without needing an open hearing". On 26 June, Musa through his own statement confirmed that he was in the United Kingdom for medical and several other personal reasons while stressing that it is done "lawfully".

=== Returning to Malaysia and arrest ===
With the pressure that any assemblyman will lost their seat based on the Article 18(2) of the state constitution that a seat can be declared vacant if an assemblyman fails to turn up for three consecutive sessions, Musa returns to Malaysia on 21 August at the Subang Airport, after transiting from the Seletar Airport in Singapore. He was taken to the Subang Jaya Medical Centre for receiving further treatment. Musa has decided to return to Malaysia to settle all outstanding issues, although this is against the doctor's advise. The former Sabah chief minister's presence at the hospital is accompanied by heavy security and secrecy. Staff nurses at Musa's suite in the VVIP section were on high alert against the press and any unauthorised visitors. Police are seeking to get a statement from Musa after he recovered from his health issue. Musa had previously claimed that he was receiving medical treatment in England and therefore was not fit to return to Malaysia. Despite this, Musa could still face investigations by the Malaysian Anti-Corruption Commission (MACC) and the Immigration Department due to the fact that there were no records of him leaving the country. On 23 August, Musa was officially arrested despite his remand application was later rejected by the magistrate that making him out on bail. On 6 September, he returned into Kota Kinabalu through a private jet and arrived at about 12.30 PM before directly went straight to the State Assembly Building to sworn as an assemblyman. Musa then return to Kuala Lumpur and depart to Putrajaya to answer questions from MACC on several graft cases during the election that was alleged to be involving him. Since the BN coalition fall in the recent election, his son Yamani has gone missing.

On 5 November 2018, Musa was charged with 35-corruption related charges include those of receiving a total of US$63 million (RM243 million) between December 2004 and November 2008 related to timber concessions when he was still chief minister to which he pled not guilty and granted RM2 million bail to enable him return to Kota Kinabalu to attend the chief minister legitimacy case.

=== Corruption charges and sudden acquittal ===
On 5 March 2019, Musa was charged with 16 money laundering charges amounting to over US$30 million related to timber concessions in Sabah. In the first charge, he was accused of ordering an individual, Richard Christopher Barnes, to open a bank account at the Singapore branch of Swiss private bank UBS on 21 June 2016. In second to fifteenth charges, Musa was said to have received over US$37 million from various individuals and companies between June 2006 and March 2008.

On 9 June 2020, Musa was acquitted from 46 corruption and money laundering charges related to the awards of logging contracts during his tenure as Sabah's chief minister after Malaysia's High Court judge Muhammad Jamil Hussin made the decision after Musa's team applied earlier for all 46 charges to be stricken out. Another report by The Edge Markets stated that deputy public prosecutor Azhar Abdul Hamid informed the court that the Attorney General's Chambers was withdrawing all the charges against Musa. The acquittal was made during the tenure of Perikatan Nasional Prime Minister Muhyiddin Yassin.

=== Appointment as state governor after recent court cases ===
Musa appointment as Sabah's 11th state governor (Yang di-Pertua Negeri) has been marred with controversy and criticised by the public especially following his sudden acquittal from court charges related to corruption by Malaysian courts. In defending wide criticism to ruling government following another acquittal of Rosmah Mansor, Prime Minister Anwar Ibrahim refuted claims that he had a role in the decision making and was quick to point that the appointment was made by King of Malaysia (Yang di-Pertuan Agong). Regardless, Musa had earlier thanked Anwar, Malaysia's King Ibrahim Iskandar and Sabah Chief Minister Hajiji Noor for the consent given towards his appointment as the 11th state governor. As Governor, he visited the State Assistant Minister of Housing and Local Government and Sungai Sibuga MLA Mohamad Hamsan Awang Supain who was also his successor in the latter role, he visited and spoke to Mohamad Hamsan who was receiving treatment for his kidney disease at the KPJ Sabah Specialist Hospital, Kota Kinabalu soon before his death on 19 January 2025.

== Election results ==
Sabah State Legislative Assembly
Year	Constituency	Candidate	Votes	Pct	Opponent(s)	Votes	Pct	Ballots cast	Majority	Turnout
1990	N15 Sugut	Musa Aman (USNO)	1,207	35.54%	Jublee Zen (PBS)	1,666	49.06%	3,396	459	69.62%
1990	N15 Sugut	Musa Aman (USNO)	1,207	35.54%	Ronald Kiandee (AKAR)	231	6.80%	3,396	459	69.62%
1990	N15 Sugut	Musa Aman (USNO)	1,207	35.54%	Abdul Rahman Atang (BERJAYA)	114	3.36%	3,396	459	69.62%
1990	N15 Sugut	Musa Aman (USNO)	1,207	35.54%	Julius Niyo (PRS)	71	2.09%	3,396	459	69.62%
1994	N17 Sungai Sibuga	Musa Aman (UMNO)	8,211	64.05%	Thim Fun Yun (PBS)	4,503	35.13%	13,031	3,708	65.29%
1994	N17 Sungai Sibuga	Musa Aman (UMNO)	8,211	64.05%	Hamid Jan (BERSEKUTU)	63	0.49%	13,031	3,708	65.29%
1994	N17 Sungai Sibuga	Musa Aman (UMNO)	8,211	64.05%	Satiman Taman (SETIA)	42	0.33%	13,031	3,708	65.29%
1999	N34 Sungai Sibuga	Musa Aman (UMNO)	7,927	55.53%	Ramli Noordin (PBS)	3,893	27.28%	14,578	4,034	64.07%
1999	N34 Sungai Sibuga	Musa Aman (UMNO)	7,927	55.53%	Musa Jala (BERSEKUTU)	2,166	15.17%	14,578	4,034	64.07%
1999	N34 Sungai Sibuga	Musa Aman (UMNO)	7,927	55.53%	Isnain Amat (SETIA)	289	2.02%	14,578	4,034	64.07%
2004	N42 Sungai Sibuga	Musa Aman (UMNO)	8,668	78.22%	Lue Sue Seng (IND)	1,998	18.03%	11,351	6,670	64.51%
2004	N42 Sungai Sibuga	Musa Aman (UMNO)	8,668	78.22%	Abdul Gani Kosui (PAS)	415	3.75%	11,351	6,670	64.51%
2008	N42 Sungai Sibuga	Musa Aman (UMNO)	8,961	71.92%	Ahmad Thamrin Mohd Jaini (PKR)	2,913	23.37%	14,494	7,658	68.06%
2008	N42 Sungai Sibuga	Musa Aman (UMNO)	8,961	71.92%	Gusniah Diong (IND)	295	2.37%	14,494	7,658	68.06%
2008	N42 Sungai Sibuga	Musa Aman (UMNO)	8,961	71.92%	Osman Enting (BERSEKUTU)	291	2.34%	14,494	7,658	68.06%
2013	N42 Sungai Sibuga	Musa Aman (UMNO)	16,637	74.32%	Irawanshah Mustapa (PKR)	5,068	22.64%	22,800	11,569	81.60%
2013	N42 Sungai Sibuga	Musa Aman (UMNO)	16,637	74.32%	A.M. Jaffar Juana (SAPP)	265	1.18%	22,800	11,569	81.60%
2013	N42 Sungai Sibuga	Musa Aman (UMNO)	16,637	74.32%	Mohd Roslan Yussof (STAR)	215	0.96%	22,800	11,569	81.60%
2013	N42 Sungai Sibuga	Musa Aman (UMNO)	16,637	74.32%	Mohd Arshad Abdul (IND)	201	0.90%	22,800	11,569	81.60%
2018	N42 Sungai Sibuga	Musa Aman (UMNO)	14,503	53.59%	Asmara Abdul Rahman (WARISAN)	12,319	45.52%	27,752	2,184	78.30%
2018	N42 Sungai Sibuga	Musa Aman (UMNO)	14,503	53.59%	Osman Enting (PKS)	241	0.89%	27,752	2,184	78.30%

== Honours ==
=== Honours of Malaysia ===
- Malaysia
  - Grand Commander of the Order of the Defender of the Realm (SMN) – Tun (2024)
  - Commander of the Order of Loyalty to the Crown of Malaysia (PSM) – Tan Sri (2017)
  - Companion of the Order of the Defender of the Realm (JMN) (1996)
  - Recipient of the National Sovereignty Medal (PKN) (2014)
- Sabah
  - Grand Master (January 2025) and Grand Commander of the Order of Kinabalu (SPDK) – Datuk Seri Panglima (2006)
  - Commander of the Order of Kinabalu (PGDK) – Datuk (1994)
  - Justice of the Peace (JP) (1988)
- Malacca
  - Grand Commander of the Exalted Order of Malacca (DGSM) – Datuk Seri (2003)
- Perlis
  - Recipient of Tuanku Syed Sirajuddin Jamalullail Silver Jubilee Medal (2025)
- Sarawak
  - Knight Commander of the Order of the Star of Hornbill Sarawak (DA) – Datuk Amar (2004)

=== Foreign honours ===
- Brunei
  - Grand Commander of the Order of the Crown of Brunei (SPMB) – Dato Seri Paduka (2012)

Political offices
Preceded by Chong Kah Kiat	Chief Minister of Sabah; 2003–2018	Succeeded by Shafie Apdal
Preceded by Juhar Mahiruddin	Yang di-Pertua Negeri of Sabah; 2025 – present	Incumbent
