= 2008 Sabah state election =

State election in Sabah, Malaysia

- 8 March 2008

All 60 seats in the Sabah State Legislative Assembly 31 seats needed for a majority
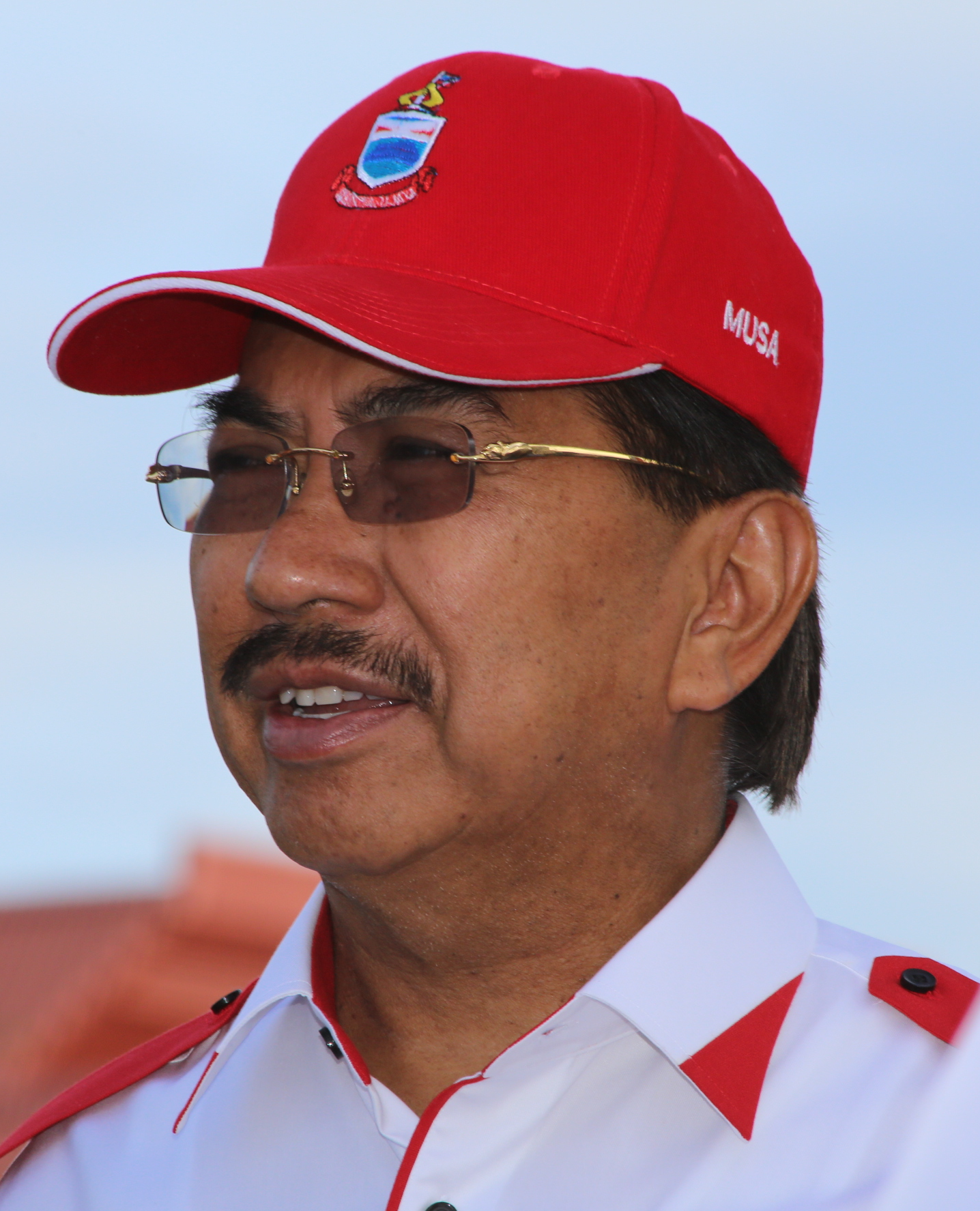

	Majority party	Minority party
Leader	Musa Aman	Hiew King Chew
Party	UMNO	DAP
Alliance	Barisan Nasional	DAP-PAS-PKR coalition
Leader since	1996
Leader's seat	Sungai Sibuga	Not contesting
Last election	59	0
Seats won	59	1
Seat change	Steady	▲1
Chief Minister before election
Musa Aman
BN-UMNO
Elected Chief Minister
Musa Aman
BN-UMNO

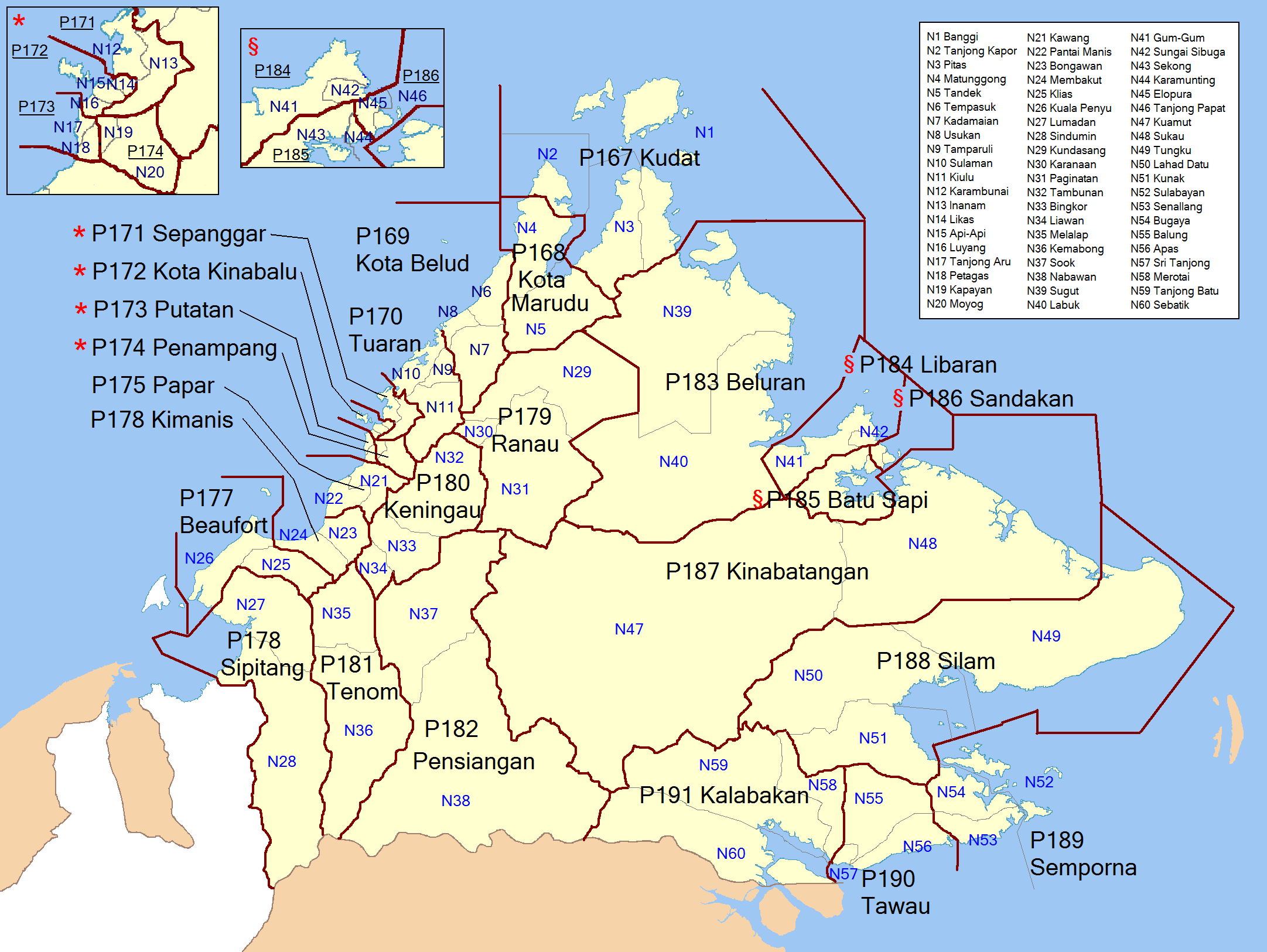
Map of Sabah electoral districts. Parliamentary districts are denoted by "P", while state assembly districts are denoted by "N".

The 2008 Sabah state election was held on Saturday, 8 March 2008, simultaneously with the 12th general election of Malaysia. 60 state assembly seats were contested. The election was won by the Barisan Nasional (BN) coalition with a similar number of seats won as in the previous election, where they won 59 seats. One seat was won by Democratic Action Party (DAP). In the previous election, BN won 59 seats, while one seat was won by an independent candidate. Other parties contesting in this election are Democratic Action Party, Parti Keadilan Rakyat, BERSEKUTU, Pasok, Setia, and 47 independent candidates. The 25 parliamentary seats were also contested the same time. This is the second time the state election of Sabah is held simultaneously with the general (parliamentary) elections, the first time being in the 2004 general elections.

The State Legislative Assembly was dissolved on 13 February 2008, after state Chief Minister Musa Aman obtained consent from the Yang di-Pertua Negeri Tun Ahmadshah Abdullah. The nomination day was held on 24 February 2008. On this day, Ramlee Marbahan of BN won the seat of N.54 Bugaya unopposed. Barisan Nasional also won two parliamentary seats on nomination day.

On 27 February 2008, the PKR candidate Mohaspa Mohd Hassan pulled out of the election, thus awarding the N.41 Gum Gum seat to Zakaria Mohd Edris.

== Results ==
Party or alliance		Votes	%	Seats	+/–
Barisan Nasional	United Malays National Organisation	180,170	34.21	32	0
Barisan Nasional	United Sabah Party	68,221	12.95	12	–1
Barisan Nasional	United Pasokmomogun Kadazandusun Murut Organisation	28,191	5.35	6	+1
Barisan Nasional	Sabah Progressive Party	27,230	5.17	4	0
Barisan Nasional	Liberal Democratic Party	11,800	2.24	3	0
Barisan Nasional	Malaysian Chinese Association	6,162	1.17	1	0
Barisan Nasional	Parti Bersatu Rakyat Sabah	5,496	1.04	1	0
Barisan Nasional	Total	327,270	62.14	59	0
Pakatan Rakyat	People's Justice Party	137,576	26.12	0	0
Pakatan Rakyat	Democratic Action Party	25,937	4.92	1	+1
Pakatan Rakyat	Pan-Malaysian Islamic Party	1,007	0.19	0	0
Pakatan Rakyat	Total	164,520	31.24	1	1
Federated Sabah People's Front		5,095	0.97	0	0
Independents		29,774	5.65	0	–1
Total		526,659	100.00	60	0
Valid votes		526,659	97.41		
Invalid/blank votes		13,998	2.59		
Total votes		540,657	100.00		
Registered voters/turnout		807,862	66.92		
Source: The Star

== Parties representing Barisan Nasional ==
Allocation of seats among parties within the ruling BN coalition is as follows. This formula was used in the 2004 election and has been retained for this election.

Barisan Nasional coalition
Party	Seats contested	Seats won
Liberal Democratic Party (LDP)	3	3
Malaysian Chinese Association (MCA)	1	1
Parti Bersatu Rakyat Sabah (PBRS)	1	1
Parti Bersatu Sabah (PBS)	13	12
Sabah Progressive Party (SAPP)	4	4
United Malays National Organisation (UMNO)	32	32
United Pasokmomogun Kadazandusun Murut Organisation (UPKO)	6	6

== Parliamentary seats ==
The parliamentary election was held simultaneously nationwide with the state elections of all Malaysian states except Sarawak. Barisan Nasional had won two seats unopposed on nomination day itself—the P.182 Pensiangan seat by Joseph Kurup, and P.191 Kalabakan by Ghapur Salleh. The following is a summary of results for parliamentary seats in Sabah:

Sabah parliamentary election, 2008
Party	Votes	Seats won (seats contested)
Barisan Nasional		24 (25)
BERSEKUTU		0 (2)
Democratic Action Party		1 (5)
Parti Keadilan Rakyat		0 (20)
PAS		0 (1)
Pasok		0 (3)
Independent		0 (16)
Total		25
