= Federated Sabah People's Front =

Federated Sabah People's Front Barisan Rakyat Sabah Bersekutu
- Abbreviation: BERSEKUTU
- Founder: Harris Salleh
- Founded: March 1998
- Dissolved: December 2010
- Split from: United Malays National Organisation
- Succeeded by: Sabah People's Front (SPF)
- Headquarters: Kota Kinabalu, Sabah
- Membership (2010): 38,000
- Colours: Blue, green, yellow

The Federated Sabah People's Front or Barisan Rakyat Sabah Bersekutu (BERSEKUTU) was a political party based in Kota Kinabalu, Sabah, Malaysia. The party was formed in March 1998 by the former Chief Minister of Sabah, Harris Salleh who wanted to replicate the success of Sabah People's United Front (Berjaya) he once led.

== 1999 General Election ==
Harris decided that the party should field candidates in all 48 constituencies of the Sabah State Legislative Assembly, compared to the 40 contested by Sabah United Party (PBS). However, they fared poorly, losing deposits; Barisan Nasional won 31 seats and PBS the remaining 17.

== Dissolution ==
The party's president, Berman Angkap announced its dissolution on 15 December 2010. He then formed a new party, the Sabah People's Front or Barisan Rakyat Sabah (SPF).

== General election results ==
| Election year | Malaysia Parliament | | Outcome |
| Election year | Candidates | Seats won | Outcome |
|---|---|---|---|
| 2008 | 2 | 0 / 222 | ; No representation in Parliament |

=== State election results ===
Sabah State Legislative Assembly
| Election | Votes | | Seats | | | Position | Status |
| Election | Count | % | Result | Won / contested | +/– | Position | Status |
|---|---|---|---|---|---|---|---|
| 1994 | 1,121 | 0.3 | 0 / 48 | 0 / 6 | Steady | ▲4th | No seats |
| 1999 | 54,732 | 10.6 | 0 / 48 | 0 / 48 | Steady | ▲3rd | No seats |
| 2004 | 5.008 | 1.2 | 0 / 60 | 0 / 10 | Steady | ▼6th | No seats |
| 2008 | 2,761 | 0.5 | 0 / 60 | 0 / 15 | Steady | ▲3rd | No seats |
