= Liberal Democratic Party (Malaysia) =

Liberal Democratic Party Liberal Democratic Party of the State of Sabah
- Malay name: Parti Liberal Demokratik; Parti Liberal Demokratik Sabah
- Abbreviation: LDP; LDP Sabah
- President: Chin Su Phin
- Secretary-General: Chin Shu Ying
- Deputy President: Yong Wui Chung
- Youth Movement Leader: Loong kok seng
- Women Movement Leader: Wong Kuen Yin
- Founder: Hiew Min Kong
- Founded: 1989
- Split from: BERJAYA
- Headquarters: P.O.Box 16033, 88866 Kota Kinabalu, Sabah
- Youth wing: Youth Movement
- Women's wing: Women Movement
- Ideology: Liberal conservatism Classical liberalism
- Political position: Centre-right
- National affiliation: Gabungan Rakyat Sabah (since 2023) (Note: The party was part of Barisan Nasional (1991–2018) and was allied with Perikatan Nasional (2020–2022)); National Unity Government (since 2023)
- Colours: Orange, black, red
- Dewan Negara: 0 / 70
- Dewan Rakyat: 0 / 26 (Sabah and Labuan seats)
- Sabah State Legislative Assembly: 1 / 79

Election symbol
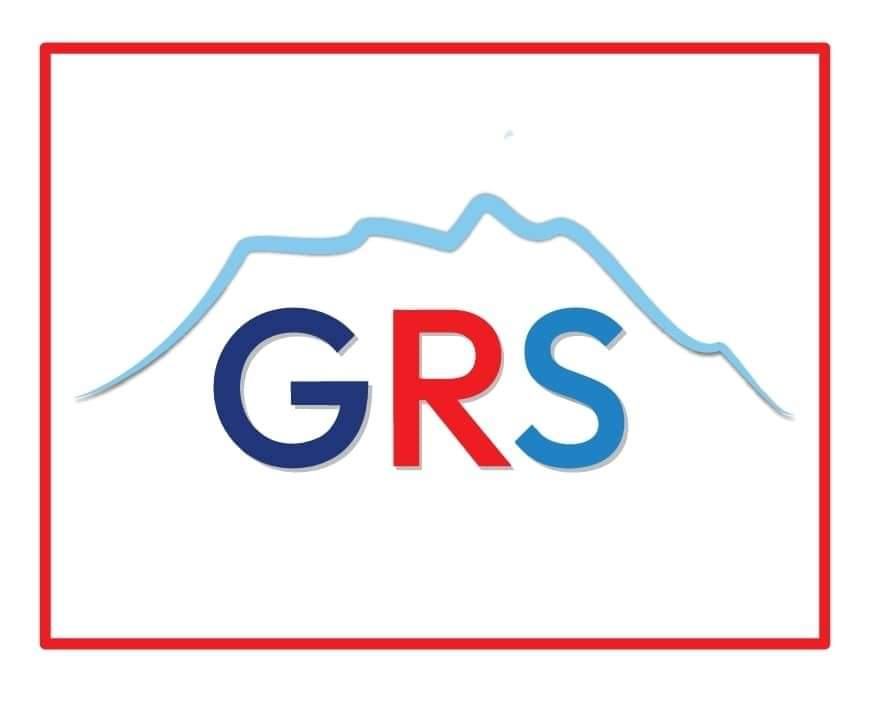

Party flag

Website
- www.ldp.org.my

The Liberal Democratic Party or well known as Liberal Democratic Party of Sabah (Malay: Parti Liberal Demokratik, or Parti Liberal Demokratik Sabah; abbrev: LDP, or LDP Sabah) is a Sabah-based political party founded in the town of Tawau by Hiew Min Kong in 1989. The party has been part of the Gabungan Rakyat Sabah (GRS) since April 2023.

The party is considered a minor political party in Malaysia, having its base mainly in Sabah. It has had no representation in either the Dewan Rakyat or the Sabah Legislative Assembly since its then-president Liew Vui Keong was defeated in Sandakan during the 2013 general election.

It left the Barisan Nasional coalition in 2018 following that year's general election.

== History ==
The Liberal Democratic Party was formed in 1989 during the era when Parti Bersatu Sabah (PBS), then a federal opposition party, was the state government of Sabah. The formation of LDP then was seen more as "a storm in a teacup" as the existence of Sabah People's United Front (BERJAYA), United Sabah National Organisation (USNO) and the Sabah Chinese Party (SCP) had posed a larger challenge to the mighty PBS then as LDP was a small party.

LDP contested the 1990 Sabah State Election and fielded 14 candidates but lost all the seats it contested. PBS won 36 seats out of the 48 State Constituencies it contested in the election. Despite LDP's defeat in the 1990 State Election, in 1991, LDP was admitted into the fold of BN as its first Chinese-based political party in Sabah. Chong Kah Kiat became the president then and had since replaced Pro tem President Hiew Ming Kong as the President of LDP.

As the United Malay National Organisation (UMNO) was introduced into Sabah to fight PBS, other BN political parties in Sabah who had contested in the 1990 State Election like BERJAYA and USNO were forced to disband and disappeared from the political scene altogether. Under the Barisan ticket, LDP was allocated three seats, Tenom, Kudat and Sembulan. LDP's candidate won the Kudat seat while lost the other two to the PBS's candidate. The aftermath of the 1994 State Election saw many state elected representatives switching their political parties. This resulted in the collapse of PBS and the emergence of Sabah UMNO which went on to form the next government. The new State Government of Sabah included LDP's sole representative, Kong Hong Ming, into the Sabah Cabinet. In 1995, LDP president Chong Kah Kiat was picked as a senator to the Dewan Negara. However, later, Chong was challenged for the presidency by Kong. Chong eventually emerged as the winner and Kong left the LDP, quitting his ministerial post from the Sabah cabinet.

Chong continued as a Federal Minister in the Prime Minister's Department from 1995 till 1999 when he resigned to return to state politics. LDP was allocated two State Constituencies seats for the 1999 State Election namely Kudat and Karamunting where the candidates are Wong Lien Tat, the Party's vice-president and Chong himself. They eventually won both seats handsomely. Both were made ministers in the state cabinet.

LDP reached its political peak when Chong became the 13th Chief Minister of Sabah under the Rotation System introduced by the then Prime Minister of Malaysia, Mahathir Mohamad in 2001. Chong Kah Kiat became Chief Minister for two years till 2003 before the post went back to UMNO and the post was never again rotated as in the 2004 Sabah state election, BN swept 59 out of the 60 state seats. LDP won all the three state seats it was allocated under the BN ticket. Despite this, LDP lost the Sandakan parliamentary seat to an independent candidate who had the backing of Sabah Progressive Party (SAPP). In 2005, Liew Vui Keong was appointed as the party's Secretary General.

In 2006, Chong Kah Kiat decided to retire as party president. Liew Vui Keong and Chin Su Phin then took over as the Party President and Deputy President posts respectively. Teo Chee Kang was appointed Secretary General. Chong Kah Kiat, however, did not retire from politics as he remained as the State's Deputy Chief Minister cum Minister of Tourism, Culture and Environment. On 13 April 2007, Chong Kah Kiat resigned from the State Cabinet due to his differences with the Chief Minister Musa Aman over the State Government's stoppage order for the construction of a Mazu statue which was undertaken by the Kudat Thean Hou Charitable Foundation in Kudat. Chong resignation from the state cabinet completes his exit in politics.

In the 2008 Sabah state election, all new faces were fielded in the three state seats allocated to LDP. LDP won all three seats comfortably as BN swept 61 seats out of the 62 state seats. Secretary general Teo Chee Kang won the Tanjong Kapor seat which was previously held by Chong Kah Kiat. New LDP President Liew Vui Keong also won the Sandakan Parliamentary seat and was subsequently appointed Deputy Minister of Trade and Industries. After the SAPP announced it would quit BN on 17 September 2008, its quota of Sabah's Deputy Chief Minister was handed over to LDP. Deputy President Chin Su Phin suggested that the party's three assemblymen were too young-and-inexperienced and therefore not ready to take up such a senior position and instead recommended Malaysian Chinese Association (MCA) for the post citing that it is the largest Chinese-based BN component party.

In spite of that, first term assemblyman Peter Pang was appointed to the post by the Chief Minister Musa. Pang was chosen because compared to the other two LDP assemblymen, Teo Chee Kang (Tanjung Kapor) and Pang Yuk Ming (Merotai), Pang is not closely aligned to Chong Kah Kiat. In September 2010, LDP lost its representation in the state cabinet when Peter Pang left the LDP. In March 2011, Peter Pang applied to join Parti Gerakan Rakyat Malaysia (GERAKAN). Peter Pang was later stripped off his position as Deputy Chief Minister, with the position eventually going to senior state assemblyman Yee Moh Chai of the PBS. Few days after the 2018 general election, the party left the defeated BN coalition.

In 2021, the party's supreme council endorsed its application to join the ruling Perikatan Nasional (PN) coalition. However, the application was rejected. On 5 April 2023, the party was admitted into Gabungan Rakyat Sabah (GRS).

== Leadership ==
=== Presidents ===
- 1989–1991; 2 years: Hiew Min Kong
- 1991–2006; 15 years: Chong Kah Kiat
- 2006–2014; 8 years: Liew Vui Keong
- 2014–2019; 5 years: Teo Chee Kang
- 2019-present; 5 years (as of 2024): Chin Su Phin

=== Supreme Council (2021-2024) ===
- President:
  - Chin Su Phin
- Deputy President:
  - Yong Wui Chung
- Vice President:
  - Ng Tet Hau
  - Peter Chin Kee Yong
  - David Ong Choon Chung
  - Chong Thien Ming
  - Wong Min Kong
  - Thien Kui Sang
  - Sim Fui
- Youth Chief:
  - Jimmy Lai Khin Hiong
- Women's Chief:
  - Wong Kuen Yin
- Secretary-General:
  - Chin Shu Ying
- Deputy Secretary-General:
  - Chin Soon Ho
- Treasurer-General:
  - John Lee Tsun Vui
- Deputy Treasurer-General:
  - Chin Kiang Ming
- Chief Publicity Officer:
  - Simon Chin Hock Siong
- Organising Secretary:
  - Goh Soo Yee
- Speaker:
  - Edward Wong Kon Fan
- Deputy Speaker:
  - Mok Cheh Hung
- Committee Members:
  - Shim Nyat Yun
  - Yii Ming Seng
  - Eric Lau kah Hon
  - Ng Kwan Loong
  - Shim Tshin Choo
  - Jason Liew Chien Yan
  - Lam Jin Dak
  - Steven Chung Kiam Fui
  - Wong Chung On
  - Chong Nyuk Fong
  - Yong Khim Vun
  - Alvin Saw Eng Seng
  - Jimmy Lai Khin Hiong
  - Max Voo Min Chung
  - Fung Thau Chim
  - Michelle Lee Cheng Wen
  - Edward Wong Kon Fan
  - Mok Cheh Hung @ Mok Kiong
  - Jin Tze Vun
  - Jacky Wong Kwan How
  - Chin Vun Pheaw
  - Lim Chin Siong
  - Nicholas Ban Wai Tzhing

== Elected representatives ==
=== Dewan Undangan Negeri (State Legislative Assembly) ===
1 / 79

State	No.	Parliamentary Constituency	No.	State Assembly Constituency	Member	Party
Sabah				Nominated Member	Chin Shu Ying	LDP
Total	Sabah (1)					

== Government offices ==
=== State governments ===
It has provided one Chief Minister under the Barisan Nasional rotation system that lasted between 1994 and 2004.

- Sabah (1994–2001, 2001–2003, 2013–2018, 2025–present)

Note: bold as Menteri Besar/Chief Minister, italic as junior partner

== General election results ==
Election	Total seats won	Seats contested	Total votes	Voting Percentage	Outcome of election	Election leader
1995	1 / 192	1			▲1 seat; Governing coalition (Barisan Nasional)	Chong Kah Kiat
1999	1 / 193	1			; Governing coalition (Barisan Nasional)	Chong Kah Kiat
2004	0 / 219	1	8,208	0.12%	▼1 seat; No representation in Parliament (Barisan Nasional)	Chong Kah Kiat
2008	1 / 222	1	8,297	0.10%	▲1 seat; Governing coalition (Barisan Nasional)	Liew Vui Keong
2013	0 / 222	1	13,138	0.12%	▼1 seats; No representation in Parliament (Barisan Nasional)	Liew Vui Keong
2018	0 / 222	1	8,996	0.07%	; No representation in Parliament (Barisan Nasional)	Teo Chee Kang

== State election results ==
Sabah State Legislative Assembly
Election	Votes		Seats			Position (Note: As part of electoral coalition.)	Status
Election	Count	%	Result	Won / contested	+/–	Position	Status
1990	14,323	3.9	0 / 48	0 / 14	Steady	3rd	No seats
1994	11,555	2.7	1 / 48	1 / 3	▲1	▲2nd (Barisan Nasional)	Opposition (1994)
1994	11,555	2.7	1 / 48	1 / 3	▲1	▲2nd (Barisan Nasional)	BN (1994–1999)
1999	11,654	2.3	2 / 48	2 / 2	▲1	▲1st (Barisan Nasional)	BN
2004	16,421	3.9	3 / 60	3 / 3	▲1	1st (Barisan Nasional)	BN
2008	11,800	2.2	2 / 60	2 / 2	▼1	1st (Barisan Nasional)	BN
2013	25,264	3.3	3 / 60	3 / 4	▲1	1st (Barisan Nasional)	BN
2018	16,345	1.9	0 / 60	0 / 4	▼3	1st (Barisan Nasional)	No seats
2020	12,447	1.7	0 / 73	0 / 46	Steady	4th	No seats
2025	Did not contest						GRS–PH–BN (Note: Appointed state assemblyman)
