= Saddi Abdul Rahman =

Malaysian politician (born 1958)

Yang Berbahagia Datuk Saddi Abdul Rahman PGDK
- سعدي عبد رحمٰن

Member of the Sabah State Legislative Assembly for Sukau
- In office 8 March 2008 – 26 September 2020
- Preceded by: Aklee Abbas (BN–UMNO)
- Succeeded by: Jafry Ariffin (BN-UMNO)
- Majority: 2,107 (2008); 4,419 (2013); 1,628 (2018)

Personal details
- Born: Saddi bin Abdul Rahman Kinabatangan, Sandakan Division, Crown Colony of North Borneo
- Party: United Malays National Organisation of Sabah (Sabah UMNO) (until 2018); Heritage Party (WARISAN) (2018–2020, since 2025); Parti Gagasan Rakyat Sabah (GAGASAN) (2023–2025)
- Other political affiliations: Barisan Nasional (BN) (until 2018); Gabungan Rakyat Sabah (GRS) (2023–2025)
- Spouse: Nordiah Jambri
- Relations: Samad Jambri (brother-in-law); Salleh Said Keruak (affinal)
- Children: Sabhi Saddi
- Occupation: Politician
- Website: https://adun48sukau.blogspot.com

Saddi bin Abdul Rahman, or commonly known as Saddi Abdul Rahman, is a Malaysian politician who had served as member of the Sabah State Legislative Assembly (MLA) for Sukau from March 2008 until September 2020. He is a member of the Heritage Party (WARISAN) and formerly a member of the United Malays National Organisation of Sabah (Sabah UMNO), a branch of a component party of Barisan Nasional (BN).

== Election results ==
Parliament of Malaysia
Year	Constituency	Candidate	Votes	Pct	Opponent(s)	Votes	Pct	Ballots cast	Majority	Turnout
2026	P187 Kinabatangan	Saddi Abdul Rahman (WARISAN)	5,638	21.33%	Naim Moktar (Sabah UMNO)	19,852	75.09%	26,436	14,214	54.26%
2026	P187 Kinabatangan	Saddi Abdul Rahman (WARISAN)	5,638	21.33%	Goldam Hamid Salangah (IND)	946	3.58%	26,436	14,214	54.26%

Sabah State Legislative Assembly
Year	Constituency	Candidate	Votes	Pct	Opponent(s)	Votes	Pct	Ballots cast	Majority	Turnout
2008	N48 Sukau	Saddi Abdul Rahman (Sabah UMNO)	3,278	63.79%	Ahdah Sulaiman (IND)	1,171	22.79%	5.137	2,107	62.94%
2008	N48 Sukau	Saddi Abdul Rahman (Sabah UMNO)	3,278	63.79%	Jakariah Janit (IND)	86	1.67%	5.137	2,107	62.94%
2008	N48 Sukau	Saddi Abdul Rahman (Sabah UMNO)	3,278	63.79%	Awang @ Roslan (BERSEKUTU)	85	1.65%	5.137	2,107	62.94%
2008	N48 Sukau	Saddi Abdul Rahman (Sabah UMNO)	3,278	63.79%	Imran Ibrahim (PAS)	76	1.48%	5.137	2,107	62.94%
2008	N48 Sukau	Saddi Abdul Rahman (Sabah UMNO)	3,278	63.79%	Jahran Gani (IND)	57	1.11%	5.137	2,107	62.94%
2008	N48 Sukau	Saddi Abdul Rahman (Sabah UMNO)	3,278	63.79%	Abdulgani Kosui (IND)	41	0.80%	5.137	2,107	62.94%
2008	N48 Sukau	Saddi Abdul Rahman (Sabah UMNO)	3,278	63.79%	Yusof Nasir (IND)	19	0.37%	5.137	2,107	62.94%
2013	N48 Sukau	Saddi Abdul Rahman (Sabah UMNO)	5,851	74.77%	Ahdah Sulaiman (PAS)	1,432	18.30%	7,813	4,419	79.58%
2013	N48 Sukau	Saddi Abdul Rahman (Sabah UMNO)	5,851	74.77%	Juhori Paritai (STAR)	197	2.52%	7,813	4,419	79.58%
2013	N48 Sukau	Saddi Abdul Rahman (Sabah UMNO)	5,851	74.77%	Aprin Musin (SAPP)	89	1.14%	7,813	4,419	79.58%
2018	N48 Sukau	Saddi Abdul Rahman (Sabah UMNO)	4,660	57.09%	Mohd Ismail Ayob (WARISAN)	3,032	37.14%	8,133	1,628	75.20%
2018	N48 Sukau	Saddi Abdul Rahman (Sabah UMNO)	4,660	57.09%	Muariffidin Abdul Malek (PHRS)	117	1.43%	8,133	1,628	75.20%
2018	N48 Sukau	Saddi Abdul Rahman (Sabah UMNO)	4,660	57.09%	Abdulgani Kosui (PPRS)	71	0.87%	8,133	1,628	75.20%

== Honours ==
- Sabah
  - Commander of the Order of Kinabalu (PGDK) – Datuk (2010)
