= Elections in Sabah =

Elections for public office in Sabah

Elections in Sabah have been held in the Malaysian state of Sabah since 1967 and have chosen Sabah's elected representatives in the Dewan Rakyat and Dewan Undangan Negeri (the Malaysian federal and state assemblies).

== Federal level ==
=== Federal constituencies ===
- List of former Malaysian federal electoral districts#Sabah
- List of Malaysian electoral districts#Sabah

== State level ==
=== State constituencies ===
- List of former Malaysian state electoral districts#Sabah

=== State elections ===
==== 1967 state election ====
Party	Votes	%	Seats
United Sabah National Organisation	64,638	40.75	14
United Pasokmomogun Kadazan Organisation	64,767	40.83	12
Sabah Chinese Association	14,924	9.41	5
Independents	14,306	9.02	1
Total	158,635	100.00	32
Valid votes	158,635	97.72	
Invalid/blank votes	3,694	2.28	
Total votes	162,329	100.00	
Registered voters/turnout	192,448	84.35	
Source: Tindak Malaysia Github

==== 1971 state election ====
Party	Seats	+/–
United Sabah National Organisation	28	+14
Sabah Chinese Association	4	–1
Total	32	0

No.	State Constituency	Member	Party
USNO 28 | SCA 4
N01	Kudat	Abdul Salam Harun	Alliance (USNO)
N02	Bengkoka-Banggi	Mustapha Harun	Alliance (USNO)
N03	Langkon	Idrus Mustakim	Alliance (USNO)
N04	Tandek	Majuning Majun @ Mohd Omar	Alliance (USNO)
N05	Usukan	Mohammad Said Keruak	Alliance (USNO)
N06	Sorob	Ismail Gimbad	Alliance (USNO)
N07	Sulaman	Dahlan Harun	Alliance (USNO)
N08	Kiulu	Payar Juman	Alliance (USNO)
N09	Jesselton Bandar	Pang Tet Tshung	Alliance (SCA)
N10	Tanjong Aru	Herman Luping	Alliance (USNO)
N11	Moyog	Peter Joinud Mojuntin	Alliance (USNO)
N12	Papar	Salleh Ibrahim	Alliance (USNO)
N13	Bongawan	Aliudin Harun	Alliance (USNO)
N14	Kuala Penyu	Fadzil Wong Fook Siang	Alliance (USNO)
N15	Labuan	Harris Salleh	Alliance (USNO)
N16	Beaufort	Mohd Dun Banir	Alliance (USNO)
N17	Tenom	Tingkalor Lampang	Alliance (USNO)
N18	Sipitang-Ulu Padas	Mohamed Yassin Hashim	Alliance (USNO)
N19	Keningau	Anthony Undan Andulag	Alliance (USNO)
N20	Pensiangan-Sook	Stephen Koroh	Alliance (USNO)
N21	Ranau	Abdul Ghani Ahmad	Alliance (USNO)
N22	Tambunan	Anthony Gibon	Alliance (USNO)
N23	Sandakan Bandar	Tan Tze Shu	Alliance (SCA)
N24	Elopura	Ngui Tet Min	Alliance (SCA)
N25	Sugut	Habib Abdul Rahman Habib Mahmud	Alliance (USNO)
N26	Labuk	Salleh Otik	Alliance (USNO)
N27	Kuala Kinabatangan	Salleh Sulong	Alliance (USNO)
N28	Lamag	Pg Mohd Ismail Pg Siat	Alliance (USNO)
N29	Lahad Datu	Johari Ariff	Alliance (USNO)
N30	Semporna	Sakaran Dandai	Alliance (USNO)
N31	Merotai	Mohamad Kassim Kamidin	Alliance (USNO)
N32	Balung	Edwin Chan Foo Sang	Alliance (SCA)

==== 1976 state election ====
Party	Votes	%	Seats	+/–
Sabah People's United Front	101,213	53.86	28	New
United Sabah National Organisation	70,157	37.33	20	–9
Sabah Chinese Association	12,075	6.43	0	–3
Malaysian Social Justice Party	2,864	1.52	0	0
United Sabah People's Organisation	83	0.04	0	0
Independents	1,527	0.81	0	0
Total	187,919	100.00	48	+16
Valid votes	187,919	97.42		
Invalid/blank votes	4,983	2.58		
Total votes	192,902	100.00		
Registered voters/turnout	239,008	80.71		
Source: Tindak Malaysia Github

==== 1981 state election ====
Party	Votes	%	Seats	+/–
Sabah People's United Front	143,557	61.36	44	+16
United Sabah National Organisation	47,069	20.12	3	–17
Sabah Chinese Consolidated Party	14,511	6.20	1	New
United Pasok Nunukragang National Organisation	17,250	7.37	0	New
Parti Perhimpunan Sosial Bersatu	1,984	0.85	0	New
Democratic Action Party	1,673	0.72	0	New
United Sabah People's Organisation	20	0.01	0	New
SEDAR	56	0.02	0	New
Independents	7,853	3.36	0	0
Total	233,973	100.00	48	0
Valid votes	233,973	98.20		
Invalid/blank votes	4,295	1.80		
Total votes	238,268	100.00		
Registered voters/turnout	314,974	75.65		
Source: HLSC Tindak Malaysia Github

== By-Elections ==
=== State Assembly ===
- 2026
1. Lamag
- 2022
1. Bugaya
- 2001
1. Likas
- 1995
1. Sulabayan
- 1991
1. Usukan
- 1990
1. Sipitang
2. Sulabayan
- 1989
1. Ranau
- 1987
1. Usukan
2. Bongawan
- 1986
1. Sukau
2. Balung
3. Buang Sayang
4. Karamunting
5. Sulaman
- 1984
1. Tambunan
- 1983
1. Banggi
2. Tamparuli
- 1982
1. Usukan
2. Tandek
- 1981
1. Bengkoka
2. Lumadan
3. Kunak
4. Balung
- 1980
1. Sugut
2. Kemabong
- 1979
1. Ranau
2. Balung
- 1978
1. Matunggong
2. Inanam
- 1977
1. Matunggong
- 1976
1. Kiulu
2. Kota Kinabalu
3. Moyog
4. Papar
5. Tanjong Aru
- 1975
1. Labuan
2. Kuala Kinabatangan
- 1973
1. Elopura
- 1968
1. Ranau

=== Dewan Rakyat ===
- 2026
1. Kinabatangan
- 2020
1. Kimanis
- 2010
1. Batu Sapi
- 2002
1. Gaya
- 1987
1. Limbawang
- 1985
1. Ulu Padas
- 1981
1. Kimanis
- 1977
1. Kimanis
2. Keningau
