= Norazlinah Arif =

Malaysian politician (born 1977)

Yang Berbahagia Datuk Hajah Norazlinah Arif PGDK ASDK
- نورأزلنا عارف

Political Secretary to the Chief Minister of Sabah
- Incumbent
- Assumed office 18 December 2025 Serving with: Arthur Sen Siong Choo &; Effendi Mohamed Sunoh &; Lahirul Latigu &; Mazlan @ Joehari Manan &; Mohd Isquzawan Israq Arsit &; Noorazmahirah Noorzain
- Chief Minister: Hajiji Noor
- Chief Political Secretary: Azrul Ibrahim

State Assistant Minister of People's Health and Wellbeing of Sabah
- In office 21 May 2019 – 29 September 2020
- Governor: Juhar Mahiruddin
- Chief Minister: Shafie Apdal
- Minister: Frankie Poon Ming Fung
- Succeeded by: Julita Mojungki

Member of the Sabah State Legislative Assembly for Kunak
- In office 9 May 2018 – 29 November 2025
- Preceded by: Nilwan Kabang (BN–UMNO)
- Succeeded by: Anil Sandhu (BN-UMNO)
- Majority: 268 (2018); 589 (2020)

Division Chairwoman of N63 Kunak Branch of Parti Gagasan Rakyat Sabah
- Incumbent
- Assumed office 2023
- President: Hajiji Noor

Women's Chief of the Heritage Party
- In office 28 August 2022 – 6 February 2023
- President: Shafie Apdal
- Preceded by: Aminah Jabarhan
- Succeeded by: Norfaizah Chua

Personal details
- Born: 1 September 1977 (age 49) Sabah, Malaysia
- Party: Heritage Party (WARISAN) (2016–2023); Parti Gagasan Rakyat Sabah (GAGASAN) (since 2023)
- Other political affiliations: Gabungan Rakyat Sabah (GRS) (since 2023)
- Spouse: Zuhairy Md. Tahir
- Education: University of Malaya
- Occupation: Politician

Norazlinah binti Arif (born 1 September 1977) is a Malaysian politician who has served as a Political Secretary to the Chief Minister of Sabah in the Gabungan Rakyat Sabah (GRS) state administration under Chief Minister Hajiji Noor since December 2025. She previously served as the State Assistant Minister of People's Health and Wellbeing of Sabah in the Heritage Party (WARISAN) state administration under Chief Minister Shafie Apdal and Minister Frankie Poon Ming Fung from May 2019 to the collapse of the WARISAN state administration in September 2020, as well as Member of the Sabah State Legislative Assembly (MLA) for Kunak from May 2018 until November 2025. She is a member of Parti Gagasan Rakyat Sabah (GAGASAN), a component party of Gabungan Rakyat Sabah (GRS) coalitions and formerly a member and Women's Chief of the Heritage Party (WARISAN).

On 6 February 2023, Norazlinah, alongside Banggi MLA Mohammad Mohamarin and Tanjong Kapor MLA Ben Chong Chen Bin left WARISAN and support the ruling GRS coalition. They eventually joined GAGASAN in March 2023.

== Health ==
Norazlinah was confirmed positive of COVID-19 in 2020.

== Election results ==
Sabah State Legislative Assembly
Year	Constituency	Candidate	Votes	Pct	Opponent(s)	Votes	Pct	Ballots cast	Majority	Turnout
2018	N51 Kunak	Norazlinah Arif (WARISAN)	4,898	47.04%	Nilwan Kabang (Sabah UMNO)	4,630	44.46%	10,413	268	71.76%
2018	N51 Kunak	Norazlinah Arif (WARISAN)	4,898	47.04%	Kasman Karate (PAS)	492	4.72%	10,413	268	71.76%
2018	N51 Kunak	Norazlinah Arif (WARISAN)	4,898	47.04%	Sahing Taking (PHRS)	141	1.35%	10,413	268	71.76%
2020	N63 Kunak	Norazlinah Arif (WARISAN)	3,861	47.46%	Halid Harun (Sabah UMNO)	3,272	40.22%	8,136	589	55.57%
2020	N63 Kunak	Norazlinah Arif (WARISAN)	3,861	47.46%	Nur Aini Abdul Rahman (LDP)	404	4.97%	8,136	589	55.57%
2020	N63 Kunak	Norazlinah Arif (WARISAN)	3,861	47.46%	Hasbi Sariat (GAGASAN)	290	3.56%	8,136	589	55.57%
2020	N63 Kunak	Norazlinah Arif (WARISAN)	3,861	47.46%	Mohd Azman @ Abdul Samad Asiman (PCS)	77	0.95%	8,136	589	55.57%
2020	N63 Kunak	Norazlinah Arif (WARISAN)	3,861	47.46%	Utoh Joehann Angkie (USNO (Baru))	32	0.39%	8,136	589	55.57%
2025	N63 Kunak	Norazlinah Arif (GAGASAN)	3,347	23.20%	Anil Sandhu (Sabah UMNO)	5,986	41.49%	14,605	2,118	58.89%
2025	N63 Kunak	Norazlinah Arif (GAGASAN)	3,347	23.20%	Jasa @ Ismail Rauddah (WARISAN)	3,868	26.81%	14,605	2,118	58.89%
2025	N63 Kunak	Norazlinah Arif (GAGASAN)	3,347	23.20%	Kasman Karate (PAS)	898	6.22%	14,605	2,118	58.89%
2025	N63 Kunak	Norazlinah Arif (GAGASAN)	3,347	23.20%	Ismu Isyam Arsad (PPRS)	188	1.30%	14,605	2,118	58.89%
2025	N63 Kunak	Norazlinah Arif (GAGASAN)	3,347	23.20%	Roselih Lumayan (IMPIAN)	142	0.98%	14,605	2,118	58.89%

== Honours ==
- Sabah
  - Commander of the Order of Kinabalu (PGDK) – Datuk (2023)
  - Companion of the Order of Kinabalu (ASDK) (2018)
