= List of members of the Malaysian Parliament who died in office =

List of Malay MPs who died in office

The following is a list of members of the Parliament of Malaysia who died in office.

== Dewan Negara ==
Member	Party	Constituency	Selection	Date of death	Age at death (years)	Cause
Leong Yew Koh	Alliance (MCA)		Nominated by the Prime Minister and appointed by the Yang di-Pertuan Agong	12 January 1963	74	
Nik Mohamed Adeeb Nik Mohamed	PAS	Kelantan	Elected by the Kelantan State Legislative Assembly	4 April 1964	46	
Oyang Lawai Jau	SNAP	Sarawak	Elected by the Sarawak State Legislative Assembly	6 August 1974		
S. P. Seenivasagam	BN (PPP)		Nominated by the Prime Minister and appointed by the Yang di-Pertuan Agong	4 July 1975		
Athi Nahappan	BN (MIC)		Nominated by the Prime Minister and appointed by the Yang di-Pertuan Agong	9 May 1976		
Ngau Ken Lock	BN (MCA)	Pahang	Elected by the Pahang State Legislative Assembly	8 March 1978		
Mohamed Said Abu Bakar	BN (USNO)		Nominated by the Prime Minister and appointed by the Yang di-Pertuan Agong	16 April 1978		
Chan Kwong Hon	BN (MCA)	Selangor	Elected by the Selangor State Legislative Assembly	29 May 1978		
Abu Bakar Titingan Damsani	BN (USNO)		Nominated by the Prime Minister and appointed by the Yang di-Pertuan Agong	20 January 1980	60	
Dasimah Dasir	BN (UMNO)		Nominated by the Prime Minister and appointed by the Yang di-Pertuan Agong	7 October 1980		
Ismail Sheikh Ibrahim	BN (UMNO)	Perlis	Elected by the Perlis State Legislative Assembly	17 June 1981		
Ismail Hassan	BN (UMNO)	Johor	Elected by the Johor State Legislative Assembly	4 October 1982		
Mohamed Ghazali Jawi	BN (UMNO)		Nominated by the Prime Minister and appointed by the Yang di-Pertuan Agong	9 December 1982		
Eban Salleh	BN (UMNO)	Johor	Elected by the Johor State Legislative Assembly	6 April 1983		
Pandak Hamid Puteh Jali	BN (UMNO)		Nominated by the Prime Minister and appointed by the Yang di-Pertuan Agong	22 May 1983		
Yaacob Engku Yunus	BN (UMNO)	Kelantan	Elected by the Kelantan State Legislative Assembly	26 August 1983		
Hussein Mohd. Nordin	BN (UMNO)		Nominated by the Prime Minister and appointed by the Yang di-Pertuan Agong	8 April 1984		
Salleh Kassim	BN (UMNO)	Trengganu	Elected by the Trengganu State Legislative Assembly	3 March 1985		
Ismail Nagore	BN (UMNO)		Nominated by the Prime Minister and appointed by the Yang di-Pertuan Agong	3 June 1987		
Jinuin Jimin	BN (PDS)	Sabah	Elected by the Sabah State Legislative Assembly	12 July 1998		Road accident
Zainol Abidin Johari	BN (UMNO)		Nominated by the Prime Minister and appointed by the Yang di-Pertuan Agong	20 July 1998		
Poo Yew Choy	BN (MCA)	Johor	Elected by the Johor State Legislative Assembly	18 March 2003		
Sinniah Raju	BN (MIC)		Nominated by the Prime Minister and appointed by the Yang di-Pertuan Agong	8 December 2004		
Mohd. Fuad Ahmad	Independent		Nominated by the Prime Minister and appointed by the Yang di-Pertuan Agong	26 April 2006		
Vijayaratnam Seevaratnam	BN (Gerakan)		Nominated by the Prime Minister and appointed by the Yang di-Pertuan Agong	3 November 2008	58	Fall from a roof
Lee Sing Chooi	BN (MCA)		Nominated by the Prime Minister and appointed by the Yang di-Pertuan Agong	9 December 2008	56	Heart attack
Ismail Md. Salleh	Independent		Nominated by the Prime Minister and appointed by the Yang di-Pertuan Agong	27 August 2009	61	Heart attack
Subbaiyah Palaniappan	BN (MIC)		Nominated by the Prime Minister and appointed by the Yang di-Pertuan Agong	18 April 2012		
Norahan Abu Bakar	BN (UMNO)	Pahang	Elected by the Pahang State Legislative Assembly	22 September 2017		
Sambanthan Manickam	All Malaysian Indian Progressive Front		Nominated by the Prime Minister and appointed by the Yang di-Pertuan Agong	15 October 2019	54	Heart attack
Ong Chong Swen	BN (MCA)		Nominated by the Prime Minister and appointed by the Yang di-Pertuan Agong	18 November 2019	69	
Mutang Tagal	GPS (PBB)		Nominated by the Prime Minister and appointed by the Yang di-Pertuan Agong	10 May 2024	69	

== Dewan Rakyat ==
Member	Party	Constituency	Date of death	Age at death (years)	Cause
Woo Saik Hong	Alliance (MCA)	Perak (Telok Anson)	6 April 1961		
Onn Jaafar	National Party	Trengganu (Kuala Trengganu Selatan)	19 January 1962	66	
Mohamed Sulong Mohd. Ali	Alliance (UMNO)	Pahang (Lipis)	24 August 1962		
Suleiman Abdul Rahman	Alliance (UMNO)	Johor (Muar Selatan)	6 November 1963	51	
Zulkiflee Mohammad	PAS	Kelantan (Bachok)	6 May 1964		
Mohamed Noordin Mastan	Alliance (UMNO)	Penang (Seberang Selatan)	1 September 1964		
Abdul Rauf Abdul Rahman	Alliance (UMNO)	Perak (Krian Laut)	1966		
Yeoh Tat Beng	Alliance (MCA)	Perak (Beruas)	17 April 1966		Road accident
Abdul Samad Gul Ahmad Mianji	PAS	Kelantan (Pasir Mas Hulu)	3 July 1967	31–32	Injuries from an axe assault
Hussein Hassan	Alliance (UMNO)	Pahang (Raub)	21 July 1967		
Ahmad Abdullah	PAS	Kelantan (Kelantan Hilir)	30 August 1967		
Abdullah Mohd Saleh	Alliance (UMNO)	Johor (Segamat Utara)	27 August 1968		
Abdul Rahman Talin	Alliance (UMNO)	Pahang (Kuantan)	18 October 1968	51–52	
Hamzah Alang	Alliance (UMNO)	Selangor (Kapar)	1 March 1970		
Kaw Kai Boh	Alliance (MCA)	Selangor (Ulu Selangor)	15 April 1972	54	Stroke
Sulaiman Mohamed Attas	Alliance (UMNO)	Negeri Sembilan (Rembau-Tampin)	9 May 1972		
Tibuoh Rantau	SUPP	Sarawak (Rajang)	1973		
Ismail Abdul Rahman	Alliance (UMNO)	Johor (Johore Timur)	2 August 1973	57	Heart attack
Walter Loh Poh Khan	BN (MCA)	Selangor (Selayang)	23 April 1975		
Abdul Razak Hussein	BN (UMNO)	Pahang (Pekan)	14 January 1976	53	Leukemia
Wan Abdul Kadir Ismail	BN (UMNO)	Trengganu (Kemaman)	14 March 1976		
Syed Jaafar Albar	BN (UMNO)	Johor (Panti)	14 January 1977	62	
Pengiran Tahir Pengiran Petra	BN (USNO)	Sabah (Kimanis)	2 December 1977		
Ali Ahmad	BN (UMNO)	Johor (Pontian)	4 December 1977	47	Plane crash
V. Manickavasagam	BN (MIC)	Selangor (Pelabuhan Kelang)	12 October 1979	53	Heart attack
Andrew Janggi Muyang	BN (PBDS)	Sarawak (Lubok Antu)	9 February 1987	40	Road accident
Abdul Hamid Mustapha	BN (USNO)	Sabah (Limbawang)	21 February 1987		
Chan Siang Sun	BN (MCA)	Pahang (Bentong)	21 March 1989	56	Heart attack
Ghazali Ahmad	BN (UMNO)	Kedah (Jerai)	31 January 1992		
P. Patto	GR (DAP)	Penang (Bagan)	12 July 1995	48	Heart attack
Abu Dahari Osman	BN (UMNO)	Pahang (Lipis)	29 December 1996		
Ong Tin Kim	BN (Gerakan)	Perak (Telok Intan)	10 April 1997		
Kamarudin Ahmad	BN (UMNO)	Perlis (Arau)	25 May 1998		
S.A. Anpalagan	BN (MIC)	Negeri Sembilan (Telok Kemang)	28 April 2000		
Fadzil Noor	Barisan Alternatif (PAS)	Kedah (Pendang)	23 June 2002	65	Complications from heart bypass surgery
Mohamed Zahir Ismail	BN (UMNO)	Perak (Pasir Salak)	14 October 2004	80	Acute renal failure
Edmund Chong Ket Wah	BN (PBS)	Sabah (Batu Sapi)	9 October 2010	54	Road accident
Lo' Lo' Mohd Ghazali	Pakatan Rakyat (PAS)	Kuala Lumpur (Titiwangsa)	17 July 2011	53	Cancer
Karpal Singh	Pakatan Rakyat (DAP)	Penang (Bukit Gelugor)	17 April 2014	73	Road accident
Seah Leong Peng	Pakatan Rakyat (DAP)	Perak (Telok Intan)	1 May 2014	48	Bladder cancer
Jamaluddin Jarjis	BN (UMNO)	Pahang (Rompin)	4 April 2015	63	Helicopter crash
Wan Mohammad Khair-il Anuar	BN (UMNO)	Perak (Kuala Kangsar)	5 May 2016	56	Helicopter crash
Noriah Kasnon	BN (UMNO)	Selangor (Sungai Besar)	5 May 2016	52	Helicopter crash (same event as Wan Mohammad Khair-il Anuar)
Zainudin Ismail	BN (UMNO)	Negeri Sembilan (Jelebu)	6 December 2017	57	Brain tumour
Abdul Manan Ismail	BN (UMNO)	Pahang (Paya Besar)	12 February 2018	69	Suspected heart attack after a fall
Wong Tien Fatt	PH (DAP)	Sabah (Sandakan)	28 March 2019	64	Heart attack
Mohamed Farid Md Rafik	PH (BERSATU)	Johor (Tanjung Piai)	21 September 2019	42	Heart attack
Liew Vui Keong	PH (Heritage)	Sabah (Batu Sapi)	2 October 2020	60	Pneumonia
Hasbullah Osman	BN (UMNO)	Perlis (Gerik)	20 November 2020	63	Heart attack
Salahuddin Ayub	PH (AMANAH)	Johor (Pulai)	23 July 2023	61	Brain hemorrhage
Bung Moktar Radin	BN (UMNO)	Sabah (Kinabatangan)	5 December 2025	66	Lung infection

== See also ==
- List of parliamentary by-elections in Malaysia
