= Nilwan Kabang =

Malaysian politician (1950–2021)

Yang Berbahagia Datuk Nilwan Kabang PGDK
- نيلوان كابڠ

State Assistant Minister of Rural Development of Sabah
- In office 2013–2018
- Governor: Juhar Mahiruddin
- Chief Minister: Musa Aman
- Succeeded by: Rasinin Kautis
- Constituency: Kunak

Member of the Sabah State Legislative Assembly for Kunak
- In office 8 March 2008 – 9 May 2018
- Preceded by: Jasa @ Ismail Rauddah (BN–UMNO)
- Succeeded by: Norazlinah Arif (WARISAN)
- Majority: 4,115 (2008); 5,360 (2013)

Personal details
- Born: Nilwan bin Kabang; 6 June 1950 Crown Colony of North Borneo (now Sabah, Malaysia)
- Died: 19 September 2021 (aged 71) Gleneagles Hospital, Kota Kinabalu
- Cause of death: COVID-19
- Resting place: Kampung Ulu Muslim Cemetery, Putatan, Sabah
- Citizenship: Malaysia
- Party: United Malays National Organisation of Sabah (Sabah UMNO) (until 2021)
- Other political affiliations: Barisan Nasional (BN) (until 2021)
- Occupation: Politician

Datuk Nilwan bin Kabang was a Malaysian politician who had served as the State Assistant Minister of Rural Development of Sabah in the Barisan Nasional (BN) state administration under Chief Minister Musa Aman from 2013 to 2018, as well as a Member of the Sabah State Legislative Assembly (MLA) for Kunak from March 2008 to May 2018. He was a member of the United Malays National Organisation of Sabah (Sabah UMNO), a branch of a component party of Barisan Nasional (BN).

== Death ==
Nilwan Kabang died on19 September 2021 at the age of 71 due to COVID-19.

== Election results ==
Sabah State Legislative Assembly
Year	Constituency	Candidate	Votes	Pct	Opponent(s)	Votes	Pct	Ballots cast	Majority	Turnout
1994	N51 Kunak	Nilwan Kabang (IND)	2,050	21.04%	Unding Lana (UMNO)	5,241	53.79%	9,550	3,179	65.57%
1994	N51 Kunak	Nilwan Kabang (IND)	2,050	21.04%	Salim Bachu (PBS)	2,062	21.16%	9,550	3,179	65.57%
1994	N51 Kunak	Nilwan Kabang (IND)	2,050	21.04%	Sarip Wahirun (BERSEKUTU)	197	2.02%	9,550	3,179	65.57%
2008	N51 Kunak	Nilwan Kabang (UMNO)	5,083	84.00%	Bedu Kudusa (PKR)	968	16.00%	6,283	4,115	64.81%
2013	N51 Kunak	Nilwan Kabang (UMNO)	6,394	72.57%	Hussein Ibnu Hassan (IND)	1,034	11.74%	9,132	5,360	77.36%
2013	N51 Kunak	Nilwan Kabang (UMNO)	6,394	72.57%	Kasman Karate (PAS)	1,002	11.37%	9,132	5,360	77.36%
2013	N51 Kunak	Nilwan Kabang (UMNO)	6,394	72.57%	Valentine @ Rengers Sebastian (STAR)	200	2.27%	9,132	5,360	77.36%
2013	N51 Kunak	Nilwan Kabang (UMNO)	6,394	72.57%	Sharif Shamsuddin Sharif Sagaf (IND)	117	1.33%	9,132	5,360	77.36%
2013	N51 Kunak	Nilwan Kabang (UMNO)	6,394	72.57%	Abdul Sattal Shafiee (IND)	64	0.73%	9,132	5,360	77.36%
2018	N51 Kunak	Nilwan Kabang (UMNO)	4,630	44.46%	Norazlinah Arif (WARISAN)	4,898	47.04%	10,413	268	71.76%
2018	N51 Kunak	Nilwan Kabang (UMNO)	4,630	44.46%	Kasman Karate (PAS)	492	4.72%	10,413	268	71.76%
2018	N51 Kunak	Nilwan Kabang (UMNO)	4,630	44.46%	Sahing Taking (PHRS)	141	1.35%	10,413	268	71.76%

== Honours ==
- Sabah
  - Commander of the Order of Kinabalu (PGDK) – Datuk (2009)
