= 2026 Lamag by-election =

By-election in Malaysia in 2026

- 24 January 2026

N58 Lamag seat in the Sabah State Legislative Assembly
- Turnout: 64.93%
	BN	WARISAN
Candidate	Mohd Ismail Ayob	Mazliwati Abdul Malik Chua
Party	Direct Member	WARISAN
Alliance	BN
Popular vote	7,269	1,588
Percentage	82.07%	17.93%
Lamag assemblyman before election
Bung Moktar Radin (deceased)
BN (UMNO)
Elected Lamag assemblyman
Mohd Ismail Ayob
BN (UMNO)

A by-election in Lamag is scheduled to be held on 24 January 2026 for the Sabah State Legislative Assembly seat of Lamag. It was called following the death of Bung Moktar Radin on 5 December 2025. Bung served as the Lamag MLA from 2020. The by-election is held concurrently with the 2026 Kinabatangan by-election, the federal seat Bung held.

The election is the first by-election since the 2025 Sabah state election which was held on 29 November 2025, only 6 days before Bung's death. Bung defended the seat and was reelected as the Lamag MLA after very narrowly defeating independent candidate Mohd Ismail Ayub, Johainizamshah Johari of the Gabungan Rakyat Sabah (GRS), Saifulah Lokman of the Heritage Party (WARISAN), Mazlin Madali of the Perikatan Nasional (PN) and Salahuddin Anoi of the Parti Impian Sabah (PIS) by a majority of only 153 votes. The by-election is also part of the second set of by-elections since GE15 where an incumbent death led to simultaneous by-elections in both parliamentary and state constituencies since Pulai and Simpang Jeram in 2023.

== Background ==
Lamag is a Muslim Bumiputera-majority seat comprising predominantly 86.0% of the overall voters, followed by 13.6% non-Muslim Bumiputera and 0.40% Chinese.

Bung Moktar died on 5 December 2025 at Kota Kinabalu Gleneagles Hospital, after being hospitalized for kidney failure and a lung infection.

== Nomination ==
BN nominated Ismail Ayob, as direct party candidate. He trailed second behind Bung Mokhtar on previous state election as an independent candidate. Warisan nominated previous Kinabatangan candidate Mazliwati Abd Malek as their by-election candidate on 5 January 2026.

Gabungan Rakyat Sabah announced it would not contest the seat out of respect for Bung. Perikatan Nasional similarly also decided not to contest both the Kinabatangan and Lamag seats.

== Timeline ==
The key dates are listed below.

Date	Event
5 December 2025	Bung Moktar Radin died in office as the Lamag MLA
16 December 2025	Issue of the Writ of Election
10 January 2026	Nomination Day
10 - 23 January 2026	Campaigning Period
20 - 23 January 2026	Early Polling Day For Postal, Overseas and Advance Voters
24 January 2026	Polling Day

== Results ==
Sabah state by-election, 24 January 2026: Lamag Upon the death of the incumbent, Bung Moktar Radin
Party	Candidate	Votes	%	∆%
BN	Mohd Ismail Ayob	7,269	82.07	▲42.93
Heritage	Mazliwati Abdul Malik Chua	1,588	17.93	▲14.50
Total valid votes		8,857	100.00	
Total rejected ballots		160		
Unreturned ballots		7		
Turnout		9,024	64.93	▼8.10
Registered electors		13,899		
Majority		5,681	64.14	▲62.61
BN hold		Swing		

== Previous results ==
Sabah state election, 2025: Lamag
Party	Candidate	Votes	%	∆%
BN	Bung Moktar Radin	3,908	39.14	▼13.42
Independent	Mohd Ismail Ayob	3,755	37.61	▲37.61
GRS	Johainizamshah Johari	1,646	16.49	▲16.49
Heritage	Mohd Saifulah Lokman	372	3.73	▼37.39
PN	Mazlin Madali	258	2.58	▲2.58
Sabah Dream Party	Salahuddin Anoi	45	0.45	▲0.45
Total valid votes		9,984		
Total rejected ballots		129		
Unreturned ballots		8		
Turnout		10,121	73.03	▲2.26
Registered electors		13,859		
Majority		153	1.53	▼9.91
BN hold		Swing		
