= Naim Moktar =

Malaysian politician (born 1994)

Yang Berhormat Datuk Naim Moktar PGDK MP
- نعيم مختار

Political Secretary to the Minister of Tourism, Culture and Environment of Sabah
- In office 9 November 2020 – 11 January 2023
- Chief Minister: Hajiji Noor
- Minister: Jafry Ariffin
- Preceded by: Mustapha Sakmud
- Succeeded by: Vivian Lee Mee Peng

Member of the Malaysian Parliament for Kinabatangan
- Incumbent
- Assumed office 24 January 2026
- Preceded by: Bung Moktar Radin (BN–UMNO)
- Majority: 14,214 (2026)

Treasurer of the Youth Wing of the United Malays National Organisation
- Incumbent
- Assumed office 23 March 2023
- President: Ahmad Zahid Hamidi
- UMNO Youth Chief: Muhamad Akmal Saleh
- Preceded by: Johan Abd Aziz

Division Youth Chief of the United Malays National Organisation of Kinabatangan
- Incumbent
- Assumed office 12 March 2023
- President: Ahmad Zahid Hamidi
- National Youth Chief: Muhamad Akmal Saleh
- State Youth Chief: Sufian Abdul Karim
- Preceded by: Mohd Aziz Mazlan

Personal details
- Born: Mohd Kurniawan Naim bin Bung Moktar; 19 March 1994 (age 32) Sandakan, Sabah, Malaysia
- Citizenship: Malaysia
- Party: United Malays National Organisation of Sabah (Sabah UMNO)
- Other political affiliations: Barisan Nasional (BN)
- Relations: Zizie Ezette (stepmother)
- Parent(s): Bung Moktar Radin (deceased); Nor Asidah Alimuddin
- Education: Open University Malaysia; TAFE International Western
- Occupation: Politician

Mohd Kurniawan Naim bin Moktar (Jawi: محمد کورنياوان نعيم بن مختار; born 19 March 1994) is a Malaysian politician who served as the Member of Parliament for Kinabatangan since January 2026. He previously served as the Political Secretary to the Minister of Tourism, Culture and Environment of Sabah from November 2020 until January 2023. He is a member and the Division Youth Chief of Kinabatangan of the United Malays National Organisation of Sabah (Sabah UMNO), a branch of a component party of the Barisan Nasional (BN) coalition. He has also served as the Treasurer of the UMNO Youth Wing since March 2023.

== Election results ==
Parliament of Malaysia
Year	Constituency	Candidate	Votes	Pct	Opponent(s)	Votes	Pct	Ballots cast	Majority	Turnout
2026	P187 Kinabatangan	Naim Moktar (Sabah UMNO)	19,852	75.09%	Saddi Abdul Rahman (WARISAN)	5,638	21.33%	26,436	14,214	54.26%
2026	P187 Kinabatangan	Naim Moktar (Sabah UMNO)	19,852	75.09%	Goldam Hamid Salangah (IND)	946	3.58%	26,436	14,214	54.26%

== Honours ==
- Sabah
  - Commander of the Order of Kinabalu (PGDK) – Datuk (2026)
  - Member of the Order of Kinabalu (ADK) (2021)
