= Frankie Poon Ming Fung =

Malaysian politician and lawyer

Yang Berbahagia Datuk Frankie Poon Ming Fung PGDK
- 潘明丰

Chairman of the Sabah Development Berhad
- In office 13 January 2023 – 13 January 2026
- Governor: Juhar Mahiruddin
- Chief Minister: Hajiji Noor
- Succeeded by: Yusof Yacob

State Minister of People's Health and Wellbeing of Sabah
- In office 21 May 2019 – 29 September 2020
- Governor: Juhar Mahiruddin
- Chief Minister: Shafie Apdal
- Assistant: Norazlinah Arif
- Preceded by: Stephen Wong Tien Fatt
- Succeeded by: Shahelmey Yahya
- Constituency: Tanjong Papat

State Minister of Youth and Sports of Sabah
- In office 16 May 2018 – 21 May 2019
- Governor: Juhar Mahiruddin
- Chief Minister: Shafie Apdal
- Assistant Minister: Arunarsin Taib
- Preceded by: Masiung Banah
- Succeeded by: Phoong Jin Zhe
- Constituency: Tanjong Papat

Member of the Sabah State Legislative Assembly for Tanjong Papat
- In office 9 May 2018 – 29 November 2025
- Preceded by: Raymond Tan Shu Kiah (BN–GERAKAN)
- Succeeded by: Alex Thien Ching Qiang (WARISAN)
- Majority: 1,816 (2018); 3,743 (2020)

State Chairman of the Democratic Action Party of Sabah
- In office 28 March 2019 – 27 October 2024 (Acting: 28 March 2019 – 22 November 2021)
- Deputy: Peter Dhoms Saili
- Secretary-General: Lim Guan Eng (2019–2022); Anthony Loke Siew Fook (2022–2024)
- National Chairman: Tan Kok Wai (2019–2022); Lim Guan Eng (2022–2024)
- Preceded by: Stephen Wong Tien Fatt
- Succeeded by: Phoong Jin Zhe

Faction represented in the Sabah State Legislative Assembly
- 2018–2025: Pakatan Harapan

Personal details
- Born: Frankie Poon Ming Fung; 30 March 1959 (age 67) Sandakan, Crown Colony of North Borneo (now Sabah, Malaysia)
- Citizenship: Malaysia
- Party: Democratic Action Party (DAP) (2013–2025); Independent (October–November 2025); Social Democratic Harmony Party (KDM) (since 2025)
- Other political affiliations: Pakatan Rakyat (PR) (2013–2015); Pakatan Harapan (PH) (2015–2025)
- Spouse: Ales Chan Ket Lei
- Education: University of Glamorgan
- Occupation: Politician
- Profession: Lawyer

Frankie Poon Ming Fung (Chinese: 潘明丰; pinyin: Pān Míngfēng; Jyutping: Pun1 Meng4 Fung1; born 30 March 1959) is a Malaysian politician and lawyer who has served as Chairman of the Sabah Development Berhad (SDB) since January 2023. He served as the State Minister of People's Health and Wellbeing of Sabah in the Heritage Party (WARISAN) state administration from May 2019 to the collapse of the WARISAN state administration in September 2020, State Minister of Youth and Sports of Sabah from May 2018 to May 2019 and Member of the Sabah State Legislative Assembly (MLA) for Tanjong Papat from May 2018 to November 2025. He is a member of the Social Democratic Harmony Party (KDM). He was an independent and a member of the Democratic Action Party (DAP), a component party of the Pakatan Harapan (PH) coalition. He has served as the State Chairman of DAP of Sabah from March 2019 to October 2024, in acting capacity from March 2019 to November 2021.

== Election results ==
Sabah State Legislative Assembly
| Year | Constituency | Candidate | Votes | Pct | Opponent(s) | Votes | Pct | Ballots cast | Majority | Turnout |
|---|---|---|---|---|---|---|---|---|---|---|
| 2013 | N46 Tanjong Papat | Poon Ming Fung (DAP) | 4,631 | 42.20% | Raymond Tan Shu Kiah (Gerakan) | 6,153 | 56.06% | 11,181 | 1,522 | 75.90% |
| 2013 | N46 Tanjong Papat | Poon Ming Fung (DAP) | 4,631 | 42.20% | Yong Chie Man (SAPP) | 191 | 1.74% | 11,181 | 1,522 | 75.90% |
| 2018 | N46 Tanjong Papat | Poon Ming Fung (DAP) | 5,818 | 56.19% | Raymond Tan Shu Kiah (Gerakan) | 4,002 | 38.66% | 10,567 | 1,816 | 72.90% |
| 2018 | N46 Tanjong Papat | Poon Ming Fung (DAP) | 5,818 | 56.19% | Jufazli Shi Ahmad (IND) | 533 | 5.15% | 10,567 | 1,816 | 72.90% |
| 2020 | N56 Tanjong Papat | Poon Ming Fung (DAP) | 5,900 | 68.00% | Yong Chie Man (SAPP) | 2,157 | 24.87% | 8,676 | 3,743 | 60.73% |
| 2020 | N56 Tanjong Papat | Poon Ming Fung (DAP) | 5,900 | 68.00% | Mohd Yunus Apil (USNO Baru) | 345 | 3.98% | 8,676 | 3,743 | 60.73% |
| 2020 | N56 Tanjong Papat | Poon Ming Fung (DAP) | 5,900 | 68.00% | Noraini Sulong (IND) | 98 | 1.13% | 8,676 | 3,743 | 60.73% |
| 2020 | N56 Tanjong Papat | Poon Ming Fung (DAP) | 5,900 | 68.00% | Chung Yu Seng (PCS) | 79 | 0.91% | 8,676 | 3,743 | 60.73% |
| 2020 | N56 Tanjong Papat | Poon Ming Fung (DAP) | 5,900 | 68.00% | Lam Jin Dak (LDP) | 62 | 0.71% | 8,676 | 3,743 | 60.73% |
| 2020 | N56 Tanjong Papat | Poon Ming Fung (DAP) | 5,900 | 68.00% | Jamal Ali (PPRS) | 35 | 0.40% | 8,676 | 3,743 | 60.73% |
| 2025 | N56 Tanjong Papat | Poon Ming Fung (KDM) | | 27.29% | Alex Thien Ching Qiang (WARISAN) | | % | | | |
| 2025 | N56 Tanjong Papat | Poon Ming Fung (KDM) | | 27.29% | Tang Szu Ching (DAP) | | % | | | |
| 2025 | N56 Tanjong Papat | Poon Ming Fung (KDM) | | 27.29% | Koa Wei Yang (Gerakan) | | % | | | |
| 2025 | N56 Tanjong Papat | Poon Ming Fung (KDM) | | 27.29% | Henley Liew Yun Ye (SAPP) | | % | | | |
| 2025 | N56 Tanjong Papat | Poon Ming Fung (KDM) | | 27.29% | Jainudin Berahim (IMPIAN) | | % | | | |
| 2025 | N56 Tanjong Papat | Poon Ming Fung (KDM) | | 27.29% | Sohaimi Ramli (PKS) | | % | | | |
| 2025 | N56 Tanjong Papat | Poon Ming Fung (KDM) | | 27.29% | Mohd Yunus Apil (PR) | | % | | | |

== Honours ==
- Sabah
  - Commander of the Order of Kinabalu (PGDK) – Datuk (2018)
