= 2026 Kinabatangan by-election =

By-election in Malaysia in 2026

- 24 January 2026

P187 Kinabatangan seat in the Dewan Rakyat
- Turnout: 55.06%
	BN	WARISAN	IND
Candidate	Mohd Kurniawan Naim Moktar	Saddi Abdul Rahman	Goldam Hamid
Party	UMNO	WARISAN	Independent
Alliance	BN
Popular vote	19,852	5,638	946
Percentage	75.09%	21.33%	3.58%
MP before election
Bung Moktar Radin (died)
BN (UMNO)
Elected MP
Mohd Kurniawan Naim Moktar
(UMNO)

By-elections in Kinabatangan are scheduled to be held on 24 January 2026 for the Dewan Rakyat seat of Kinabatangan. It was called following the death of Bung Moktar Radin on 5 December 2025. Bung served as the Kinabatangan MP from 1999. The by-election is held concurrently with the 2026 Lamag by-election, the state seat Bung held.

The election is the fourth federal by-election since GE15 and part of the second set of by-elections where an incumbent death led to simultaneous by-elections in both parliamentary and state constituencies since Pulai in 2023. (Note: Not counting the federal by-election for Padang Serai and state by-election for Tioman, both of which were delayed to 7 December 2022 because of the death of the respective candidates after nomination day for GE15. Both by-elections and results are considered as part of the 2022 general election and 2022 Pahang state election.)

== Background ==
Kinbatangan is a Sabah Bumiputera-majority seat comprising 65.0% of the overall voters, followed by 27.6% Malay-Muslim Bumiputera, 5.40% of other ethnicities and 2.0% Chinese.

Bung Moktar died on 5 December 2025 at Kota Kinabalu Gleneagles Hospital, after being hospitalized for kidney failure and a lung infection.

== Nomination ==
On 19 December 2025, Barisan Nasional named Mohd Kurniawan Naim Moktar, the son of Bung Mokhtar, as their candidate for the seat. Warisan nominated former Sukau assemblyman Saddi Abdul Rahman as their candidate on 5 January 2026. Three days later, lawyer Goldam Hamid announced his intention of running as independent.

Gabungan Rakyat Sabah announced it would not contest the seat out of respect for Bung. Perikatan Nasional similarly also decided not to contest both the Kinabatangan and Lamag seats.

== Timeline ==
The key dates are listed below.

Date	Event
5 December 2025	Bung Moktar Radin died in office as the Kinabatangan MP
16 December 2025	Issue of the Writ of Election
10 January 2026	Nomination Day
10 - 23 January 2026	Campaigning Period
20 - 23 January 2026	Early Polling Day For Postal, Overseas and Advance Voters
24 January 2026	Polling Day

== Results ==
Malaysian general by-election, 24 January 2026: Kinabatangan Upon the death of the incumbent, Bung Moktar Radin
Party	Candidate	Votes	%	∆%
BN	Naim Kurniawan Moktar	19,852	75.09	▲17.66
Heritage	Saddi Abdul Rahman	5,638	21.33	▼21.29
Independent	Goldam Hamid	946	3.58	▲3.58
Total valid votes		26,436	100.00	
Total rejected ballots		369		
Unreturned ballots		22		
Turnout		26,827	55.06	▼10.50
Registered electors		48,722		
Majority		14,214	53.76	▲38.95
BN hold		Swing		

== Previous results ==
Malaysian general election, 2022: Kinabatangan
Party	Candidate	Votes	%	∆%
BN	Bung Mokhtar Radin	16,842	57.43	▼12.13
Heritage	Mazliwati Abdul Malek Chua	12,512	42.62	▲19.44
Total valid votes		29,354	100.00	
Total rejected ballots		452		
Unreturned ballots		76		
Turnout		29,882	65.56	▼11.91
Registered electors		44,773		
Majority		4,330	14.81	▼29.24
BN hold		Swing		
Source(s) https://lom.agc.gov.my/ilims/upload/portal/akta/outputp/1753262/PUB619_2022.pdf
