= Anil Sandhu =

Malaysian politician and businessman (born 1985)

Yang Berhormat Dato' Sri Dr. Anil Sandhu SSAP MLA
- أنيل سانضو

State Assistant Minister of Youth Development, Sports Advancement and Creative Industries of Sabah
- Incumbent
- Assumed office 15 December 2025
- Governor: Musa Aman
- Chief Minister: Hajiji Noor
- Minister: Nizam Abu Bakar Titingan
- Preceded by: Fairuz Renddan (as Assistant Minister of Youth and Sports)
- Constituency: Kunak

Member of the Sabah State Legislative Assembly for Kunak
- Incumbent
- Assumed office 29 November 2025
- Preceded by: Norazlinah Arif (GRS–GAGASAN)
- Majority: 2,118 (2025)

Personal details
- Born: Aniljeet Singh Sandhu; 15 August 1984 (age 42) Lahad Datu, Sabah, Malaysia
- Citizenship: Malaysia
- Party: United Malays National Organisation of Sabah (Sabah UMNO)
- Other political affiliations: Barisan Nasional (BN)
- Education: Institut Prima Bestari (BBA & MBA); University of Technology Malaysia (Masters); Kutztown University (PhD)
- Occupation: Politician
- Profession: Businessman
- Website: https://www.facebook.com/anil.sandhu.455849

Aniljeet Singh Sandhu, commonly known as Anil Sandhu Abdullah (born 15 August 1984), is a Malaysian politician and businessman who has served as the State Assistant Minister of Youth Development, Sports Advancement and Creative Industries of Sabah in the Gabungan Rakyat Sabah (GRS) state administration under Chief Minister Hajiji Noor and Minister Nizam Abu Bakar Titingan since December 2025, as well as Member of the Sabah State Legislative Assembly (MLA) for Kunak since November 2025. He is a member and Lahad Datu divisional youth chief of the United Malays National Organisation of Sabah (Sabah UMNO), a branch of a component party of the Barisan Nasional (BN) coalition.

== Education ==
- Bachelor of Business Administration (BBA), Institut Prima Bestari, Kota Kinabalu, Sabah
- Master of Business Administration (MBA), Institusi Prima Bestari, Kota Kinabalu, Sabah
- Master's degree in Political Science, University of Technology Malaysia
- Doctor of Philosophy (PhD) in Social Philosophy, Kutztown University

== Leadership Experiences ==
- Treasurer of UMNO Youth of Sabah (since 2023)
- Division Youth Chief of Lahad Datu UMNO (since 2023)
- Deputy Chairman of Tourism Malaysia (2020–2023)
- Vice President of the Malaysian Hockey Confederation (since 2019)

== Election results ==
Sabah State Legislative Assembly
Year	Constituency	Candidate	Votes	Pct	Opponent(s)	Votes	Pct	Ballots cast	Majority	Turnout
2025	N63 Kunak	Anil Sandhu (Sabah UMNO)	5,986	41.49%	Jasa @ Ismail Rauddah (WARISAN)	3,868	26.81%	14,605	2,118	58.89%
2025	N63 Kunak	Anil Sandhu (Sabah UMNO)	5,986	41.49%	Norazlinah Arif (GAGASAN)	3,347	23.20%	14,605	2,118	58.89%
2025	N63 Kunak	Anil Sandhu (Sabah UMNO)	5,986	41.49%	Kasman Karate (PAS)	898	6.22%	14,605	2,118	58.89%
2025	N63 Kunak	Anil Sandhu (Sabah UMNO)	5,986	41.49%	Ismu Isyam Arsad (PPRS)	188	1.30%	14,605	2,118	58.89%
2025	N63 Kunak	Anil Sandhu (Sabah UMNO)	5,986	41.49%	Roselih Lumayan (IMPIAN)	142	0.98%	14,605	2,118	58.89%

== Honours ==
=== Honours of Malaysia ===
- Pahang
  - Knight Grand Companion of the Order of Sultan Ahmad Shah of Pahang (SSAP) – Dato' Sri (2016)
  - Knight Companion of the Order of the Crown of Pahang (DIMP) – Dato' (2014)
