= Tanjong Papat =

Tanjong Papat (N56)
Sabah constituency

State constituency
- Legislature: Sabah State Legislative Assembly
MLA
Alex Thien Ching Qiang
Heritage
- Constituency created: 1984
- First contested: 1986
- Last contested: 2025

Demographics
- Electors (2025): 16,767

Tanjong Papat is a state constituency in Sabah, Malaysia, that is represented in the Sabah State Legislative Assembly.

== Demographics ==
Ethnic breakdown of Tanjong Papat's electorate as of 2025
1. Muslim Bumiputera (45.0%)
2. Chinese (43.0%)
3. Non-Muslim Bumiputera (12.0%)
4. Other ethnicities (0.00%)

== History ==
=== Polling districts ===
According to the gazette issued on 31 October 2022, the Tanjong Papat constituency has a total of 7 polling districts.

| State constituency | Polling District | Code | Location |
|---|---|---|---|
| Tanjong Papat (N56) | Happy Valley | 186/56/01 | SMK St. Michael |
| Tanjong Papat (N56) | Sandakan Pekan | 186/56/02 | SJK (C) Cheng Min |
| Tanjong Papat (N56) | Cathay | 186/56/03 | Wisma Perbandaran |
| Tanjong Papat (N56) | Pasar | 186/56/04 | Wisma Warisan |
| Tanjong Papat (N56) | Sim-Sim | 186/56/05 | SK Sungai Anib 1 |
| Tanjong Papat (N56) | Pulau Berhala | 186/56/06 | SK Sri Tanjung Papat 1; SK Sri Tanjung Papat 2 |
| Tanjong Papat (N56) | Jalan Dua | 186/56/07 | Wisma Sandaraya |

=== Representation history ===
Member of Sabah State Legislative Assembly for Tanjong Papat
| Assembly | No | Years | Member | Party |
Constituency renamed from Bandar Sandakan
| 7th | N19 | 1985 – 1986 | Tan Kit Sher (陈吉士) | PBS |
| 8th | N19 | 1986 – 1990 | Tan Kit Sher (陈吉士) | PBS |
| 9th | N19 | 1990 – 1994 | Tan Kit Sher (陈吉士) | GR (PBS) |
| 10th | N19 | 1994 – 1999 | Raymond Tan Shu Kiah (陈树杰) | BN (SAPP) |
| 11th | N37 | 1999 – 2004 | Raymond Tan Shu Kiah (陈树杰) | BN (SAPP) |
| 12th | N46 | 2004 – 2008 | Raymond Tan Shu Kiah (陈树杰) | BN (SAPP) |
| 13th | N46 | 2008 – 2013 | Raymond Tan Shu Kiah (陈树杰) | BN (GERAKAN) |
| 14th | N46 | 2013 – 2018 | Raymond Tan Shu Kiah (陈树杰) | BN (GERAKAN) |
| 15th | N46 | 2018 – 2020 | Poon Ming Fung (潘明丰) | PH (DAP) |
| 16th | N56 | 2020 – 2025 | Poon Ming Fung (潘明丰) | PH (DAP) |
| 17th | N56 | 2025–present | Alex Thien Ching Qiang (邓靖強) | WARISAN |

== Election results ==
Sabah state election, 2025: Tanjong Papat
| Party | Candidate | Votes | % | ∆% |
|---|---|---|---|---|
| Heritage | Alex Thien Ching Qiang | 3,254 | 35.14 | ▼31.20 |
| KDM | Frankie Poon Ming Fung | 2,527 | 27.29 | ▲27.29 |
| PH | Tang Szu Ching | 2,241 | 24.20 | ▲24.20 |
| Perjuangan Rakyat | Mohd Yunus Apil | 659 | 7.12 | ▲7.12 |
| PN | Koa Wei Yang | 240 | 2.59 | ▼21.76 |
| Sabah Dream Party | Jainudin Berahim | 149 | 1.61 | ▲1.61 |
| Sabah Nationality Party | Sohaimi Ramli | 96 | 1.04 | ▲1.04 |
| SAPP | Henley Liew Yun Ye | 93 | 1.00 | ▲1.00 |
| Total valid votes | | 9,259 | | |
| Total rejected ballots | | 164 | | |
| Unreturned ballots | | 10 | | |
| Turnout | | 9,433 | 56.26 | ▼5.74 |
| Registered electors | | 16,767 | | |
| Majority | | 727 | 7.85 | ▼34.41 |
| Heritage hold | | Swing | | |

Sabah state election, 2020: Tanjong Papat
| Party | Candidate | Votes | % | ∆% |
|---|---|---|---|---|
| Sabah Heritage Party | Poon Ming Fung | 5,900 | 66.61 | ▲66.61 |
| PN | Ken Yong | 2,157 | 24.35 | ▲24.35 |
| USNO (Baru) | Mohd Yunus Apil | 345 | 3.89 | ▲3.89 |
| Independent | Noraini Sulong | 98 | 1.11 | ▲1.11 |
| Love Sabah Party | Chung Yu Seng | 79 | 0.89 | ▲0.89 |
| LDP | Lam Jin Dak | 62 | 0.70 | ▲0.70 |
| Sabah People's Unity Party | Jamal ALi | 35 | 0.40 | ▲0.40 |
| Total valid votes | | 8,676 | 97.95 | |
| Total rejected ballots | | 160 | 1.81 | |
| Unreturned ballots | | 22 | 0.25 | |
| Turnout | | 8,858 | 62.00 | ▼10.92 |
| Registered electors | | 14,287 | | |
| Majority | | 3,473 | 42.26 | ▲25.07 |
| Sabah Heritage Party hold | | Swing | | |
Source(s) "RESULTS OF CONTESTED ELECTION AND STATEMENTS OF THE POLL AFTER THE OFFICIAL ADDITION OF VOTES".

Sabah state election, 2018: Tanjong Papat
| Party | Candidate | Votes | % | ∆% |
|---|---|---|---|---|
| PH | Poon Ming Fung | 5,818 | 55.06 | ▲55.06 |
| BN | Raymond Tan Shu Kiah | 4,002 | 37.87 | ▼3.50 |
| Independent | Jufazli Ahmad | 533 | 5.04 | ▲5.04 |
| Total valid votes | | 10,353 | 97.97 | |
| Total rejected ballots | | 196 | 1.85 | |
| Unreturned ballots | | 18 | 0.17 | |
| Turnout | | 10,567 | 72.92 | ▼3.02 |
| Registered electors | | 14,492 | | |
| Majority | | 1,816 | 17.19 | ▲3.59 |
| PH gain from BN | | Swing | | ? |
Source(s) "RESULTS OF CONTESTED ELECTION AND STATEMENTS OF THE POLL AFTER THE OFFICIAL ADDITION OF VOTES".

Sabah state election, 2013: Tanjong Papat
| Party | Candidate | Votes | % | ∆% |
|---|---|---|---|---|
| BN | Raymond Tan Shu Kiah | 6,153 | 54.97 | ▼14.92 |
| DAP | Poon Ming Fung | 4,631 | 41.37 | ▲14.32 |
| SAPP | Yong Chie Man @ Yu Chie Man | 191 | 1.71 | ▲1.71 |
| Total valid votes | | 10,975 | 98.04 | |
| Total rejected ballots | | 206 | 1.84 | |
| Unreturned ballots | | 13 | 0.12 | |
| Turnout | | 11,194 | 75.94 | ▲12.54 |
| Registered electors | | 14,741 | | |
| Majority | | 1,522 | 13.60 | ▼29.15 |
| BN hold | | Swing | | |
Source(s) "KEPUTUSAN PILIHAN RAYA UMUM DEWAN UNDANGAN NEGERI". Archived from the original on 2022-08-19.

Sabah state election, 2008: Tanjong Papat
| Party | Candidate | Votes | % | ∆% |
|---|---|---|---|---|
| BN | Raymond Tan Shu Kiah | 6,418 | 69.89 | |
| DAP | Teo Yan Boon @ Anthony | 2,492 | 27.14 | |
| Total valid votes | | 8,910 | 97.03 | |
| Total rejected ballots | | 273 | 2.97 | |
| Unreturned ballots | | 0 | 0.00 | |
| Turnout | | 9,183 | 63.40 | |
| Registered electors | | 14,484 | | |
| Majority | | 3,926 | 42.75 | |
| BN hold | | Swing | | |
Source(s) "KEPUTUSAN PILIHAN RAYA UMUM DEWAN UNDANGAN NEGERI SABAH BAGI TAHUN 2008".

Sabah state election, 2004: Tanjong Papat
| Party | Candidate | Votes | % | ∆% |
|---|---|---|---|---|
On the nomination day, Raymond Tan Shu Kiah won uncontested.
| BN | Raymond Tan Shu Kiah | | | |
| Total valid votes | | | | |
| Total rejected ballots | | | | |
| Unreturned ballots | | | | |
| Turnout | | | | |
| Registered electors | | 15,172 | | |
| Majority | | | | |
| BN hold | | Swing | | |
Source(s) "KEPUTUSAN PILIHAN RAYA UMUM DEWAN UNDANGAN NEGERI SABAH BAGI TAHUN 2004".

Sabah state election, 1999: Tanjong Papat
| Party | Candidate | Votes | % | ∆% |
|---|---|---|---|---|
| BN | Raymond Tan Shu Kiah | 4,482 | 46.37 | ▲3.79 |
| PBS | Ang Lian Hai | 2,786 | 28.83 | ▼12.73 |
| BERSEKUTU | John Khoo Cheo Ping | 2,311 | 23.91 | ▲23.91 |
| Total valid votes | | 9,579 | 99.11 | |
| Total rejected ballots | | 86 | 0.89 | |
| Unreturned ballots | | 0 | 0.00 | |
| Turnout | | 9,665 | 66.85 | ▼0.48 |
| Registered electors | | 14,457 | | |
| Majority | | 1,696 | 17.54 | ▲16.52 |
| BN hold | | Swing | | |
Source(s) "KEPUTUSAN PILIHAN RAYA UMUM DEWAN UNDANGAN NEGERI SABAH BAGI TAHUN 1999".

Sabah state election, 1994: Tanjong Papat
| Party | Candidate | Votes | % | ∆% |
|---|---|---|---|---|
| BN | Raymond Tan Shu Kiah | 3,614 | 42.58 | ▲26.98 |
| PBS | Lai Lun Tze | 3,527 | 41.56 | ▼13.93 |
| DAP | Fung Ket Wing | 1,282 | 15.11 | ▼7.45 |
| Total valid votes | | 8,423 | 99.25 | |
| Total rejected ballots | | 64 | 0.75 | |
| Unreturned ballots | | 0 | 0.00 | |
| Turnout | | 8,487 | 67.33 | ▼3.53 |
| Registered electors | | 12,605 | | |
| Majority | | 87 | 1.02 | ▼31.91 |
| BN gain from PBS | | Swing | | ? |
Source(s) "KEPUTUSAN PILIHAN RAYA UMUM DEWAN UNDANGAN NEGERI SABAH BAGI TAHUN 1994".

Sabah state election, 1990: Tanjong Papat
| Party | Candidate | Votes | % | ∆% |
|---|---|---|---|---|
| PBS | Tan Kit Sher | 4,630 | 55.49 | ▼2.39 |
| DAP | Fung Ket Wing | 1,882 | 22.56 | ▲22.56 |
| LDP | Lau Ngan Siew | 1,302 | 15.60 | ▲15.60 |
| BERJAYA | Yap Pak Chau | 469 | 5.62 | ▼15.87 |
| Total valid votes | | 8,283 | 99.27 | |
| Total rejected ballots | | 61 | 0.73 | |
| Unreturned ballots | | 0 | 0.00 | |
| Turnout | | 8,344 | 70.86 | ▼0.14 |
| Registered electors | | 11,776 | | |
| Majority | | 2,748 | 32.93 | ▼3.46 |
| PBS hold | | Swing | | |
Source(s) "KEPUTUSAN PILIHAN RAYA UMUM DEWAN UNDANGAN NEGERI SABAH BAGI TAHUN 1990".

Sabah state election, 1986: Tanjong Papat
| Party | Candidate | Votes | % | ∆% |
|---|---|---|---|---|
| PBS | Tan Kit Sher | 4,708 | 57.88 | ▲17.13 |
| BERJAYA | Chin Su Kim | 1,748 | 21.49 | ▼16.74 |
| Independent | Wong Hee Yung | 1,552 | 19.08 | ▲19.08 |
| SCCP | Fu Sui Cheong @ Philip | 53 | 0.65 | ▲0.65 |
| Love Sabah Party | Huang Han Ching | 47 | 0.58 | ▲0.58 |
| Total valid votes | | 8,108 | 99.68 | |
| Total rejected ballots | | 26 | 0.32 | |
| Unreturned ballots | | 0 | 0.00 | |
| Turnout | | 8,134 | 71.00 | ▼0.62 |
| Registered electors | | 11,457 | | |
| Majority | | 2,960 | 36.39 | ▲33.87 |
| PBS hold | | Swing | | |
Source(s) "KEPUTUSAN PILIHAN RAYA UMUM DEWAN UNDANGAN NEGERI SABAH BAGI TAHUN 1986".

Sabah state election, 1985: Tanjong Papat
| Party | Candidate | Votes | % |
|---|---|---|---|
| PBS | Tan Kit Sher | 3,213 | 40.75 |
| BERJAYA | Wong Soon Yu | 3,014 | 38.23 |
| DAP | Fung Ket Wang | 1,657 | 21.02 |
| Total valid votes | | 7,884 | 99.33 |
| Total rejected ballots | | 53 | |
| Unreturned ballots | | 0 | 0.00 |
| Turnout | | 7,937 | 71.62 |
| Registered electors | | 11,082 | |
| Majority | | 199 | 2.52 |
This was a new constituency created.
Source(s) "How they fared". New Straits Times. 1985-04-22.
