= Tambisan Island =

Island in Malaysia

- Interactive map of Tambisan Island

Geography
- Coordinates: 5°28′0″N 119°7′0″E

Administration
- Malaysia
- State: Sabah
- Division: Sandakan
- District: Sandakan

Tambisan Island (Malay: Pulau Tambisan) is a Malaysian island located in the Sulu Sea on the state of Sabah.

== See also ==
- List of islands of Malaysia
