= UMNO of Sabah =

Sabah branch of a political party of Malaysia

United Malays National Organisation of Sabah
- Malay name: Pertubuhan Kebangsaan Melayu Bersatu Malaysia Sabah
- Abbreviation: Sabah UMNO
- Chairman: Jafry Ariffin
- Deputy Chairman: Hasnol Ayub
- Founder: Mahathir Mohamad; Anwar Ibrahim; Abdul Ghafar Baba; Mustapha Harun; Harris Salleh
- Founded: 21 February 1991; 35 years ago
- Preceded by: USNO; BERJAYA
- Membership (2025): 10,457 (estimated in Sabah)
- National affiliation: Barisan Nasional (since 1991); Perikatan Nasional (2020–2022)^{1} National Unity Government (since 2022)
- Regional affiliation: Gabungan Rakyat Sabah (2020–2023, since 2025)^{2}
- Colours: Red and white
- Slogan: United, Loyal, In Service; Bersatu, Bersetia, Berkhidmat
- Dewan Negara Malaysia: 0 / 70
- Dewan Rakyat Malaysia: 6 / 26 (Sabah and Labuan seats)
- Sabah State Legislative Assembly: 5 / 79
- Chief ministers in Malaysia (Sabah Chief Minister): 0 / 1

Election symbol
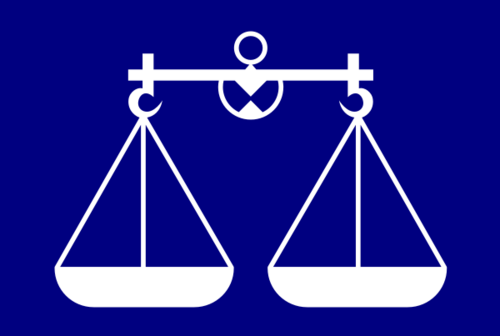

Party flag
- Politics of Malaysia; Political parties; Elections^{1}As partners at the federal and state level.^{2} UMNO Sabah was a member of the coalition from 2020 but was not included when formalised in 2022. It has provided support for a Gabungan Rakyat Sabah-led government since 2020, though not unanimously.

United Malays National Organisation of Sabah (Malay: Pertubuhan Kebangsaan Melayu Bersatu Sabah), also abbreviated as Sabah UMNO, is a branch of the United Malays National Organisation in Sabah, Malaysia.

It operates with a degree of autonomy from the central leadership based in the peninsular Malaysia.

== History ==
Following the 1990 state election where the Sabah People's United Front (BERJAYA) failed to win any seats, it merged with the United Sabah National Organisation (USNO) to form the Sabah chapter of the peninsula-based United Malays National Organisation. It was the ruling party in Sabah as part of the wider Barisan Nasional coalition from 1994 until the 2018 state election.

Following the party's defeat in 2018, Sabah UMNO chairman Hajiji Noor half the party's elected representatives, five members of parliament and nine state assemblymen, to leave the party and sit as independents. They subsequently joined the Malaysian United Indigenous Party (BERSATU), itself an UMNO splinter party, and formed its Sabah chapter.

Hajiji was replaced by Bung Moktar Radin, and the state chapter persisted despite concerns that it may be dissolved.

The party triggered the 2023 Sabah political crisis when it, as the leader of Barisan Nasional in the state, withdrew the coalition's support for the Gabungan Rakyat Sabah government led by Hajiji. This triggered a split within the state chapter as five assemblymen announced their support for Hajiji. The crisis ended when the central leadership of Barisan Nasional resolved to support Hajiji as chief minister, so as to reflect the parties' co-operation at the federal level as part of the Anwar Ibrahim cabinet. The five assemblymen who supported Hajiji later left the party to join Hajiji's Parti Gagasan Rakyat Sabah (GAGASAN).

== List of leaders ==
=== List of Chairmen ===
No.	Portrait	Chairmen	Term start	Term end	Time in office	Deputy Chairmen
1		Mustapha Harun (born 1918, death 1995); MLA for Bengkoka-Banggi, 1967–1976; MLA for Banggi, 1976–1981; MLA for Usukan, 1985–1986, 1987–1994	1990	1994	4 years	Unknown
2		Sakaran Dandai (born 1930, death 2021); MLA for Semporna, 1967–1985; MLA for Sulabayan, 1985–1990, 1994	1994	2002	8 years	Shafie Apdal (1995–2001)
3		Musa Aman (born 1951); MLA for Sungai Sibuga, 1994–2020	2003	9 December 2018	15 years	Shafie Apdal (2004/2005-2014/2015); Bung Moktar Radin (unknown date)
4		Hajiji Noor (born 1956); MLA for Sulaman, since 1990	10 December 2018	11 December 2018	1 day	Yamani Hafez Musa (2018)
5		Bung Moktar Radin (born 1958, death 2025); MP for Kinabatangan, 1999–2025, MLA for Lamag, 2020–2025	12 December 2018	5 December 2025	6 years, 358 days	Yakub Khan (2018–2023); Abdul Rahman Dahlan (2023–2025)
6		Jafry Ariffin; MLA for Sukau, since 2020	10 December 2025	Incumbent	321 days	Hasnol Ayub (since 2025)

== Elected representatives ==
=== Dewan Rakyat (House of Representatives) ===
==== Members of Parliament of the 15th Malaysian Parliament ====
Sabah UMNO has 6 members in the House of Representatives.

State	No.	Parliament Constituency	Member	Party
Sabah
Sabah	P173	Putatan	~~Shahelmey Yahya~~	UMNO
Sabah	P176	Kimanis	Mohamad Alamin	UMNO
Sabah	P177	Beaufort	Siti Aminah Aching	UMNO
Sabah	P184	Libaran	Suhaimi Nasir	UMNO
Sabah	P187	Kinabatangan	Naim Moktar	UMNO
Sabah	P191	Kalabakan	~~Andi Muhammad Suryady Bandy~~	UMNO
Total	Sabah (6)			

=== Dewan Undangan Negeri (State Legislative Assembly) ===
Sabah State Legislative Assembly
5 / 79

State	No.	Parliament Constituency	No.	State Constituency	Member	Party
Sabah	P167	Kudat	N2	Bengkoka	Harun Durabi	UMNO
Sabah	P180	Keningau	N41	Liawan	Nik Mohd Nadzri Nik Zawawi	UMNO
Sabah	P187	Kinabatangan				
Sabah	P187	Kinabatangan	N58	Lamag	Mohd Ismail Ayob	UMNO
Sabah	P187	Kinabatangan	N59	Sukau	Jafry Ariffin	UMNO
Sabah	P188	Lahad Datu	N63	Kunak	Anil Jeet Singh	UMNO
Total	Sabah (5)					

== General election results ==
Election	Total seats won	Seats contested	Total votes	Voting Percentage	Outcome of election	Election leader
1995	9 / 192	9 (under BN)	Unknown	Unknown	▲9 seats; Governing coalition (Barisan Nasional)	Sakaran Dandai
1999	11 / 193	11 (under BN)	139,654	2.10%	▲2 seats; Governing coalition (Barisan Nasional)	Osu Sukam
2004	13 / 219	13 (under BN)	93,831	1.35%	▲2 seats; Governing coalition (Barisan Nasional)	Musa Aman
2008	13 / 222	13 (under BN)	154,207	1.95%	; Governing coalition (Barisan Nasional)	Musa Aman
2013	14 / 222	14 (under BN)	258,298	2.34%	▲1 seat; Governing coalition (Barisan Nasional)	Musa Aman
2018	7 / 222	14 (under BN)	199,395	1.65%	▼7 seats; Opposition coalition (Barisan Nasional) later Governing coalition (Barisan Nasional)	Musa Aman (resigned); Hajiji Noor (resigned); Bung Moktar Radin
2022	6 / 222	11 (under BN)	185,094	1.19%	▼1 seat; Governing coalition (Barisan Nasional)	Bung Moktar Radin

== State election results ==
State election	State Legislative Assembly	
State election	Sabah	Total won / Total contested
2/3 majority	2 / 3	2 / 3
1994	19 / 48	19 / 31
1999	24 / 48	
2004	32 / 60	32 / 32
2008	32 / 60	32 / 32
2013	31 / 60	31 / 32
2018	17 / 60	17 / 32
2020	14 / 73	14 / 33
After 2022 GE (not including appointed members)	10 / 79	10 / 33
2025	5 / 79	5 / 41

== See also ==
- List of political parties in Malaysia
- Politics of Malaysia
- Barisan Nasional
