= Kunak (state constituency) =

Kunak (N63)
Sabah constituency

State constituency
- Legislature: Sabah State Legislative Assembly
MLA
Anil Jeet Singh
BN
- Constituency created: 1974
- First contested: 1974
- Last contested: 2025

Demographics
- Population (2020): 68,475
- Electors (2025): 24,854

Kunak is a state constituency in Sabah, Malaysia, that is represented in the Sabah State Legislative Assembly.

== Demographics ==
As of 2020, Kunak has a population of 68,475 people.

Ethnic breakdown of Kunak's electorate as of 2025
1. Muslim Bumiputera (92.0%)
2. Non-Muslim Bumiputera (5.00%)
3. Chinese (2.00%)
4. Other ethnicities (1.00%)

== History ==
=== Polling districts ===
According to the gazette issued on 31 October 2022, the Kunak constituency has a total of 8 polling districts.

State constituency	Polling District	Code	Location
Kunak (N63)	Mostyn	188/63/08	SK Mostyn
Kunak (N63)	Madai	188/63/02	SMK Madai
Kunak (N63)	Kampung Kunak	188/63/03	SK Kunak I
Kunak (N63)	Gidam	188/63/04	SK Ladang Giram
Kunak (N63)	Pengkalan Kunak	188/63/05	SMK Kunak
Kunak (N63)	Kunak Jaya	183/63/06	SK Kampung Selamat
Kunak (N63)	Pangi	183/63/07	SK Pangi
Kunak (N63)	Pekan Kunak	183/63/08	SMK Kunak Jaya

=== Representation history ===
Member of Sabah State Legislative Assembly for Kunak
Assembly	No	Years	Member	Party
Constituency created from Lahad Datu and Semporna
5th	N41	1976 – 1981	Salim Bachu	Alliance (USNO)
6th	N41	1981	Abdul Hamid Mustapha	BN (BERJAYA)
6th	N41	1981 – 1985	Salim Bachu	USNO
7th	N46	1985 – 1986	Salim Bachu	USNO
8th	N46	1986 – 1990	Salim Bachu	USNO
9th	N46	1990	Salim Bachu	BN (USNO)
9th	N46	1990 – 1994	Salim Bachu	BN (UMNO)
10th	N46	1994 – 1999	Unding Lana	BN (UMNO)
11th	N41	1999 – 2004	Jasa @ Ismail Rauddah	BN (UMNO)
12th	N51	2004 – 2008	Jasa @ Ismail Rauddah	BN (UMNO)
13th	N51	2008 – 2013	Nilwan Kabang	BN (UMNO)
14th	N51	2013 – 2018	Nilwan Kabang	BN (UMNO)
15th	N51	2018 – 2020	Norazlinah Arif	WARISAN
16th	N63	2020 – 2023	Norazlinah Arif	WARISAN
16th	N63	2023–2025	Norazlinah Arif	GRS (GAGASAN)
17th	N63	2025–present	Anil Jeet Singh	BN (UMNO)

== Election results ==
Sabah state election, 2025
Party	Candidate	Votes	%	∆%
BN	Anil Jeet Singh	5,986	41.49	▲1.22
Heritage	Jasa Ismail Raudah	3,868	26.81	▼20.65
GRS	Norazlinah Arif	3,347	23.20	▲23.20
PN	Kasman Karate	898	6.22	▲6.22
Sabah People's Unity Party	Ismu Isyam Arsad	188	1.30	▲1.30
Sabah Dream Party	Roselih Lumayan	142	0.98	▲0.98
Total valid votes		14,429		
Total rejected ballots		176		
Unreturned ballots		31		
Turnout		14,636	58.89	▲3.32
Registered electors		24,854		
Majority		2,118	14.68	▲7.44
BN gain from Heritage		Swing		?
Source(s) "RESULTS OF CONTESTED ELECTION AND STATEMENTS OF THE POLL AFTER THE OFFICIAL ADDITION OF VOTES" (PDF).

Sabah state election, 2020
Party	Candidate	Votes	%	∆%
Sabah Heritage Party	Norazlinah Arif	3,861	47.46	▲0.42
BN	Halid Harun	3,272	40.22	▼4.24
LDP	Nur Aini Abdul Rahman	404	4.97	▲4.97
GAGASAN	Hasbi Sariat	290	3.56	▲3.56
Love Sabah Party	Mohd Azman Abdul Samad Asiman	77	0.95	▲0.95
USNO (Baru)	Utoh Joehann Angkie	32	0.39	▲0.39
Total valid votes		7,936	97.54	
Total rejected ballots		168	2.06	
Unreturned ballots		32	0.39	
Turnout		8,136	55.57	▼16.19
Registered electors		14,641		
Majority		589	7.24	▲4.66
Sabah Heritage Party hold		Swing		
Source(s) "RESULTS OF CONTESTED ELECTION AND STATEMENTS OF THE POLL AFTER THE OFFICIAL ADDITION OF VOTES".

Sabah state election, 2018
Party	Candidate	Votes	%	∆%
Sabah Heritage Party	Norazlinah Arif	4,898	47.04	▲47.04
BN	Nilwan Kabang	4,630	44.46	▼25.56
PAS	Kasman Karate	492	4.72	▼6.25
Sabah People's Hope Party	Sahing Taking	141	1.35	▲1.35
Total valid votes		10,161	97.58	
Total rejected ballots		223	2.14	
Unreturned ballots		29	0.28	
Turnout		10,413	71.76	▼5.60
Registered electors		14,511		
Majority		268	2.58	▼56.12
Sabah Heritage Party gain from BN		Swing		?
Source(s) "RESULTS OF CONTESTED ELECTION AND STATEMENTS OF THE POLL AFTER THE OFFICIAL ADDITION OF VOTES".

Sabah state election, 2013
Party	Candidate	Votes	%	∆%
BN	Nilwan Kabang	6,394	70.02	▼10.88
Independent	Hussein Ibnu Hassan	1,034	11.32	▲11.32
PAS	Kasman Karate	1,002	10.97	▲10.97
STAR	Valentine @ Rengers Sebastian	200	2.19	▲2.19
Independent	Sharif Shamsuddin Sharif Sagaf	117	1.28	▲1.28
Independent	Abdul Sattal Shafiee	64	0.70	▲0.70
Total valid votes		8,811	96.48	
Total rejected ballots		295	3.23	
Unreturned ballots		26	0.28	
Turnout		9,132	77.36	▲12.55
Registered electors		11,804		
Majority		5,360	58.70	▼6.79
BN hold		Swing		
Source(s) "KEPUTUSAN PILIHAN RAYA UMUM DEWAN UNDANGAN NEGERI". Archived from the original on 2022-10-10.

Sabah state election, 2008
Party	Candidate	Votes	%	∆%
BN	Nilwan Kabang	5,083	80.90	▲25.42
PKR	Bedu Kudusa	968	15.41	▲11.89
Total valid votes		6,051	96.31	
Total rejected ballots		225	3.58	
Unreturned ballots		7	0.11	
Turnout		6,283	64.81	▲2.02
Registered electors		9,694		
Majority		4,115	65.49	▲33.59
BN hold		Swing		
Source(s) "KEPUTUSAN PILIHAN RAYA UMUM DEWAN UNDANGAN NEGERI SABAH BAGI TAHUN 2008".

Sabah state election, 2004
Party	Candidate	Votes	%	∆%
BN	Jasa @ Ismail Rauddah	3,344	55.48	▲6.38
Independent	Rajib Salim @ Arif	1,421	23.58	▲23.58
SETIA	Sahing Taking	823	13.66	▲8.31
PKR	Citra Masadi	212	3.52	▲3.52
Total valid votes		5,800	96.23	
Total rejected ballots		222	3.68	
Unreturned ballots		5	0.08	
Turnout		6,027	62.79	▼1.37
Registered electors		9,598		
Majority		1,923	31.90	▲5.40
BN hold		Swing		
Source(s) "KEPUTUSAN PILIHAN RAYA UMUM DEWAN UNDANGAN NEGERI SABAH BAGI TAHUN 2004".

Sabah state election, 1999
Party	Candidate	Votes	%	∆%
BN	Jasa @ Ismail Rauddah	4,619	49.10	▼4.69
PBS	Abdullah Minun Sahirun	2,126	22.60	▲1.44
Independent	Mohd Amin Jaafar	1,987	21.12	▲21.12
SETIA	Rayman Udin	503	5.35	▲5.35
Total valid votes		9,235	98.17	
Total rejected ballots		172	1.83	
Unreturned ballots		0	0.00	
Turnout		9,407	64.16	▼1.41
Registered electors		14,661		
Majority		2,493	26.50	▼6.13
BN hold		Swing		
Source(s) "KEPUTUSAN PILIHAN RAYA UMUM DEWAN UNDANGAN NEGERI SABAH BAGI TAHUN 1999".

Sabah state election, 1994
Party	Candidate	Votes	%	∆%
BN	Unding Lana	5,241	53.79	▲10.57
PBS	Salim Bachu	2,062	21.16	▼10.26
Independent	Nilwan Kabang	2,050	21.04	▲21.04
BERSEKUTU	Sarip Wahirun	197	2.02	▼16.75
Total valid votes		9,550	98.02	
Total rejected ballots		193	1.98	
Unreturned ballots		0	0.00	
Turnout		9,743	65.57	▼4.10
Registered electors		14,858		
Majority		3,179	32.63	▲20.85
BN hold		Swing		
Source(s) "KEPUTUSAN PILIHAN RAYA UMUM DEWAN UNDANGAN NEGERI SABAH BAGI TAHUN 1994".

Sabah state election, 1990
Party	Candidate	Votes	%	∆%
USNO	Salim Bachu	3,305	43.22	▼18.17
PBS	William Chiuh	2,404	31.44	▼3.95
BERSEKUTU	Mahmud Mansor	1,435	18.77	▲18.77
Independent	Mohd Saip Abdul Garang	153	2.00	▲2.00
PRS	Musa Nasir	130	1.70	▲1.70
Independent	Taasim Salasa	43	0.56	▲0.56
Total valid votes		7,470	97.69	
Total rejected ballots		177	2.31	
Unreturned ballots		0	0.00	
Turnout		7,647	69.67	▲1.33
Registered electors		10,976		
Majority		901	11.78	▼14.23
USNO hold		Swing		
Source(s) "KEPUTUSAN PILIHAN RAYA UMUM DEWAN UNDANGAN NEGERI SABAH BAGI TAHUN 1990".

Sabah state election, 1986
Party	Candidate	Votes	%	∆%
USNO	Salim Bachu	3,750	61.39	▲9.01
PBS	William Chiuh	2,161	35.38	▲35.38
Independent	Mohamad Jikiranu @ Utoh Imam Tahassam	105	1.72	▲1.72
Total valid votes		6,016	98.49	
Total rejected ballots		92	1.51	
Unreturned ballots		0	0.00	
Turnout		6,108	68.34	▼4.21
Registered electors		8,938		
Majority		1,589	26.01	▲13.90
USNO hold		Swing		
Source(s) "KEPUTUSAN PILIHAN RAYA UMUM DEWAN UNDANGAN NEGERI SABAH BAGI TAHUN 1986".

Sabah state election, 1985
Party	Candidate	Votes	%	∆%
USNO	Salim Bacho	3,131	52.38	▲4.39
BERJAYA	Mohd. Ainal Fattah	2,407	40.27	▼11.74
Bersatu Rakyat Bumiputera Sabah	Wahab Ibno Said	236	3.95	▲3.95
BERSIH	Sharif Mohammad Sharif Mohmin	118	1.97	▲1.97
Independent	Ismail Rugasan	85	1.42	▲1.42
Total valid votes		5,977		
Total rejected ballots		188		
Unreturned ballots		0		
Turnout		6,165	72.55	▼4.18
Registered electors		8,497		
Majority		724	12.11	▲8.09
USNO gain from Parti Berjaya		Swing		?

Sabah state election, 1981
Party	Candidate	Votes	%	∆%
BERJAYA	Abdul Hamid Mustapha	1,917	52.01	▲32.57
USNO	Salim Bacho	1,769	47.99	▼19.81
Total valid votes		3,686		
Total rejected ballots		40		
Unreturned ballots		0		
Turnout		3,726	76.73	▼6.75
Registered electors		4,856		
Majority		148	4.02	▼44.34
BERJAYA gain from USNO		Swing		?

Sabah state election, 1976
Party	Candidate	Votes	%
USNO	Salim Bacho	1,960	67.80
BERJAYA	Salleh Abdul Kahar	562	19.44
Independent	Wahab Ibno Said	301	10.41
PEKEMAS	Tadus Udin	68	2.35
Total valid votes		2,891	
Total rejected ballots		161	
Unreturned ballots		0	
Turnout		3,052	83.48
Registered electors		3,656	
Majority		1,398	48.36
This was a new seat created
