= Jafry Ariffin =

Malaysian politician (born 1963)

Yang Berhormat Datuk Jafry Ariffin PGDK JP MLA
- جفري عارفين

State Minister of Tourism, Culture and Environment of Sabah
- Incumbent
- Assumed office 2 December 2025
- Governor: Musa Aman
- Chief Minister: Hajiji Noor
- Assistant: Andi Rizal
- Preceded by: Christina Liew Chin Jin
- Constituency: Sukau
- In office 8 October 2020 – 11 January 2023
- Governor: Juhar Mahiruddin
- Chief Minister: Hajiji Noor
- Assistant: Joniston Bangkuai
- Preceded by: Christina Liew Chin Jin
- Succeeded by: Christina Liew Chin Jin
- Constituency: Sukau

Member of the Sabah State Legislative Assembly for Sukau
- Incumbent
- Assumed office 26 September 2020
- Preceded by: Saddi Abdul Rahman (BN–UMNO)
- Majority: 2,129 (2020); 1,234 (2025)

State Deputy Chairman of the Barisan Nasional of Sabah
- Incumbent
- Assumed office 21 January 2026
- National Chairman: Ahmad Zahid Hamidi
- State Chairman: Arthur Joseph Kurup

State Chairman of the United Malays National Organisation of Sabah
- Incumbent
- Assumed office 10 December 2025
- President: Ahmad Zahid Hamidi
- Deputy: Mohd Hasnol Ayub
- Preceded by: Bung Moktar Radin

Faction represented in the Sabah State Legislative Assembly
- 2020–: Barisan Nasional

Personal details
- Born: Jafry bin Ariffin; 26 October 1963 (age 62) Kinabatangan, Sabah, Malaysia
- Party: United Malays National Organisation of Sabah (Sabah UMNO)
- Other political affiliations: Barisan Nasional of Sabah (Sabah BN)
- Spouse: Halida Bahad
- Education: International Islamic University Malaysia
- Occupation: Politician

Jafry bin Ariffin (born 26 October 1963) is a Malaysian politician who has served as the State Minister of Tourism, Culture and Environment of Sabah in the Gabungan Rakyat Sabah (GRS) state administration under Chief Minister Hajiji Noor since December 2025 and from October 2020 to his removal from the position in January 2023 as well as Member of Sabah State Legislative Assembly (MLA) for Sukau since September 2020. He is a member of the United Malays National Organisation of Sabah (Sabah UMNO), a component party of the Barisan Nasional of Sabah (Sabah BN) coalition. He has served as the State Deputy Chairman of Sabah BN since January 2026 and State Chairman of Sabah UMNO since December 2025. In addition, he is also the Acting Division Chief of UMNO of Kinabatangan.

== Election results ==
Sabah State Legislative Assembly
Year	Constituency	Candidate	Votes	Pct	Opponent(s)	Votes	Pct	Ballots cast	Majority	Turnout
2020	N59 Sukau	Jafry Ariffin (Sabah UMNO)	3,763	55.67%	Amrah Liwangsa (WARISAN)	1,634	24.16%	10,482	2,129	76.98%
2020	N59 Sukau	Jafry Ariffin (Sabah UMNO)	3,763	55.67%	Saddi Abdul Rahman (IND)	1,228	18.17%	10,482	2,129	76.98%
2020	N59 Sukau	Jafry Ariffin (Sabah UMNO)	3,763	55.67%	Malaya Kasurah (PCS)	94	1.39%	10,482	2,129	76.98%
2020	N59 Sukau	Jafry Ariffin (Sabah UMNO)	3,763	55.67%	Jakariah Janit (GAGASAN)	41	0.61%	10,482	2,129	76.98%
2025	N59 Sukau	Jafry Ariffin (Sabah UMNO)	5,143	45.68%	Juhari Janan (GAGASAN)	3,909	34.72%	11,493	1,234	69.52%
2025	N59 Sukau	Jafry Ariffin (Sabah UMNO)	5,143	45.68%	Azhari Rangon (WARISAN)	1,605	14.26%	11,493	1,234	69.52%
2025	N59 Sukau	Jafry Ariffin (Sabah UMNO)	5,143	45.68%	Pengiran Petra Pengiran Asri (Sabah BERSATU)	381	3.38%	11,493	1,234	69.52%
2025	N59 Sukau	Jafry Ariffin (Sabah UMNO)	5,143	45.68%	Roslan Madali (IMPIAN)	118	1.05%	11,493	1,234	69.52%
2025	N59 Sukau	Jafry Ariffin (Sabah UMNO)	5,143	45.68%	Nordin Damit (PR)	54	0.48%	11,493	1,234	69.52%
2025	N59 Sukau	Jafry Ariffin (Sabah UMNO)	5,143	45.68%	Afiq Anwari Zulkifli (PKS)	48	0.43%	11,493	1,234	69.52%

== Honours ==
=== Honours of Malaysia ===
- Malaysia
  - Medal of the Order of the Defender of the Realm (PPN) (2008)
- Sabah
  - Commander of the Order of Kinabalu (PGDK) – Datuk (2016)
  - Justice of the Peace (JP) (2021)

== See also ==
- List of International Islamic University Malaysia alumni
