= Kinabatangan (federal constituency) =

Federal constituency of Sabah, Malaysia

Kinabatangan (P187)
Sabah constituency

Federal constituency
- Legislature: Dewan Rakyat
- MP: Mohd Kurniawan Naim Moktar; BN
- Constituency created: 1966
- First contested: 1969
- Last contested: 2026

Demographics
- Population (2020): 216,087
- Electors (2025): 48,722
- Area (km²): 18,068
- Pop. density (per km²): 12

Kinabatangan is a federal constituency in Sandakan Division (Tongod District, Kinabatangan District and Beluran District) as well as Tawau Division (Lahad Datu District), Sabah, Malaysia, that has been represented in the Dewan Rakyat since 1971.

The federal constituency was created in the 1966 redistribution and is mandated to return a single member to the Dewan Rakyat under the first past the post voting system.

Kinabatangan is the largest parliamentary constituency in Sabah and third largest in Malaysia overall, spanning an area of over 18,000 sq km.

== Demographics ==
第15届全国大选-东方日报-2022

Ethnic breakdown of Kinabatangan's electorate as of 2022
1. Sabah Bumiputera (65.0%)
2. Malay-Muslim Bumiputera (27.6%)
3. Other ethnicities (5.40%)
4. Chinese (2.00%)

As of 2020, Kinabatangan has a population of 216,087 people.

Age breakdown of Kinabatangan's electorate as of 2022
1. 18-20 (8.38%)
2. 21-29 (26.0%)
3. 30-39 (23.6%)
4. 40-49 (15.9%)
5. 50-59 (12.2%)
6. 60-69 (8.10%)
7. 70-79 (3.16%)
8. 80-89 (1.47%)
9. above 90 (1.12%)
Gender breakdown of Kinabatangan's electorate as of 2022
1. Male (51.7%)
2. Female (48.3%)

== History ==
=== Polling districts ===
According to the gazette issued on 21 November 2025, the Kinabatangan constituency has a total of 27 polling districts.

State constituency	Polling Districts	Code	Location
Kuamut（N57）	Mananam	187/57/01	SK Menanam
Kuamut（N57）	Sogo-Sogo	187/57/02	SK Sogo-Sogo
Kuamut（N57）	Entilibon	187/57/03	SMK Entilibon
Kuamut（N57）	Karamuak	187/57/04	SK Karamuak
Kuamut（N57）	Kuamut	187/57/05	SK Kuamut
Kuamut（N57）	Tongod	187/57/06	SK Pekan Tongod
Kuamut（N57）	Penangah	187/57/07	SK Penangah
Kuamut（N57）	Masaum	187/57/08	SK Masaum
Kuamut（N57）	Inarad	187/57/09	SK Inarad
Kuamut（N57）	Saguan	187/57/10	SK Minusuh; SK Saguon
Lamag（N58）	Buang Sayang	187/58/01	SK Buang Sayang
Lamag（N58）	Bukit Garam	187/58/02	SK Bukit Garam; SMK Bukit Garam
Lamag（N58）	Lamag	187/58/03	SK Sangau; SK Sungai Lokan
Lamag（N58）	Balat	187/58/04	Dewan Serbaguna Kg Balat Kinabatangan
Lamag（N58）	Kota Kinabatangan	187/58/05	SMK Bukit Garam II; SK Bukit Garam II
Lamag（N58）	Usaha Jaya	187/58/06	SK Kota Kinabatangan
Sukau（N59）	Tanjung Aru	187/59/01	SK Tanjong Aru; SK Tanjong Batu
Sukau（N59）	Mumiang	187/59/02	SK Mumiang
Sukau（N59）	Lubukan	187/59/03	SK Pulau Lubukan
Sukau（N59）	Suan Lamba	187/59/04	SK Rancangan Suan Lamba
Sukau（N59）	Batu Puteh	187/59/05	SK Batu Puteh
Sukau（N59）	Paris	187/59/06	SK Paris
Sukau（N59）	Bilit	187/59/07	SK Bilit
Sukau（N59）	Sukau	187/59/08	SK Sukau
Sukau（N59）	Abai	187/59/09	SK Abai
Sukau（N59）	Tundun Bohangin	187/59/10	SK Tundun Bohangin
Sukau（N59）	Lintang	187/59/11	SK Lintang; SK Sri Ganda; SK Ladang Tomanggong

=== Representation history ===
Members of Parliament for Kinabatangan
Parliament	No	Years	Member	Party	Vote Share
Constituency created
		1969-1971	Parliament was suspended		
3rd	P118	1971-1973	Pengiran Ahmad Pengiran Indar (ڤڠيران أحمد ڤڠيران إيندر)	USNO	Uncontested
3rd	P118	1973-1974	Pengiran Ahmad Pengiran Indar (ڤڠيران أحمد ڤڠيران إيندر)	BN (USNO)	Uncontested
4th	P124	1974-1978	Pengiran Ahmad Pengiran Indar (ڤڠيران أحمد ڤڠيران إيندر)	BN (USNO)	Uncontested
5th	P124	1978-1982	Abdul Ghani Misbah (عبدالغني مصباح)	BN (BERJAYA)	4,935; 64.08%
6th	P124	1982-1986	Abdul Ghani Misbah (عبدالغني مصباح)	BN (BERJAYA)	Uncontested
7th	P141	1986-1990	Pitting Mohd Ali (ڤيتّيڠ محمّد علي)	BN (USNO)	3,273; 40.19%
8th	P141	1990-1995	Juhar Mahiruddin (جوهر ماهرالدين)	BN (UMNO)	5,472; 50.77%
9th	P162	1995-1999	Juhar Mahiruddin (جوهر ماهرالدين)	BN (UMNO)	6,431; 58.66%
10th	P162	1999-2004	Bung Moktar Radin (بوڠ مختار راضين)	BN (UMNO)	8,141; 65.72%
11th	P187	2004-2008	Bung Moktar Radin (بوڠ مختار راضين)	BN (UMNO)	Uncontested
12th	P187	2008-2013	Bung Moktar Radin (بوڠ مختار راضين)	BN (UMNO)	8,507; 69.71%
13th	P187	2013-2018	Bung Moktar Radin (بوڠ مختار راضين)	BN (UMNO)	13,377; 69.29%
14th	P187	2018–2022	Bung Moktar Radin (بوڠ مختار راضين)	BN (UMNO)	14,465; 67.22%
15th	P187	2022–2025	Bung Moktar Radin (بوڠ مختار راضين)	BN (UMNO)	16,842; 57.43%
15th	P187	2026–present	Mohd Kurniawan Naim Moktar (محمّد کورنياوان نعيم مختار)	BN (UMNO)	19,852; 75.09%

=== State constituency ===
Parliamentary constituency	State constituency					
Parliamentary constituency	1967–1974	1974–1985	1985–1995	1995–2004	2004–2020	2020–present
Kinabatangan	Lamag					Lamag
Kinabatangan	Kuala Kinabatangan					
Kinabatangan		Kuamut				
Kinabatangan		Sekong				
Kinabatangan			Sukau			

=== Historical boundaries ===
State Constituency	Area					
State Constituency	1966	1974	1984	1994	2003	2019
Lamag	Bukit Garam; Kinabatangan; Kuamut; Lamag; Tongod					Buang Sayang; Bukit Garam; Kota Kinabatangan; Lamag; Sungai Lokan
Kuala Kinabatangan	Abai; Pulau Timbang; Segaliud; Suan Lamba; Sukau	Abai; Bukit Garam; Lamag; Suan Lamba; Sukau				
Kuamut		Entilibon; Karamuak; Kuamut; Menanam; Tongod	Bukit Garam; Entilibon; Kota Kinabatangan; Kuamut; Tongod			Entilibon; Karamuak; Kuamut; Menanam; Tongod
Sekong		Kampung Lot M; Pulau Timbang; Segaliud; Sekong; Suan Lamba	Batu Sapi; Kampung Lot M; Pulau Timbang; Segaliud; Sekong			
Sukau			Abai; Kampung Batu Puteh; Paris; Suan Lamba; Sukau	Abai; Hamparan Badai; Kampung Batu Puteh; Segaliud; Sukau	Abai; Kampung Batu Puteh; Paris; Suan Lamba; Sukau	

=== Current state assembly members ===
No.	State Constituency	Member	Coalition (Party)
N57	Kuamut	Masiung Banah	GRS (GAGASAN)
N58	Lamag	Mohd Ismail Ayob	BN (UMNO)
N59	Sukau	Jafry Arifin	BN (UMNO)

=== Local governments & postcodes ===
No.	State Constituency	Local Government	Postcode
N57	Kuamut	Kinabatangan District Council (Kuamut area); Tongod District Council; Telupid District Council (Karamuak)	89320, 89330 Tongod; 90000 Sandakan; 90100 Beluran; 90200 Kota Kinabatangan
N58	Lamag	Beluran District Council (Sungai Sapi area); Kinabatangan District Council; Telupid District Council (Sungai Sapi area); Tongod District Council (Sungai Sapi and Monsok Mill areas)	89320, 89330 Tongod; 90000 Sandakan; 90100 Beluran; 90200 Kota Kinabatangan
N59	Sukau	Kinabatangan District Council; Lahad Datu District Council (Lintang); Sandakan Municipal Council (Sian Lamba, Lubukan, Mumiang, Tanjung Aru)	89320, 89330 Tongod; 90000 Sandakan; 90100 Beluran; 90200 Kota Kinabatangan

== Election results ==
Malaysian general by-election, 24 January 2026 Upon the death of the incumbent, Bung Moktar Radin
Party	Candidate	Votes	%	∆%
BN	Mohd Kurniawan Naim Moktar	19,852	75.09	▲17.66
Heritage	Saddi Abdul Rahman	5,638	21.33	▼21.29
Independent	Goldam Hamid	946	3.58	▲3.58
Total valid votes		26,436	100.00	
Total rejected ballots		369		
Unreturned ballots		22		
Turnout		26,827	55.06	▼10.50
Registered electors		48,722		
Majority		14,214	53.76	▲38.95
BN hold		Swing		

Malaysian general election, 2022
Party	Candidate	Votes	%	∆%
BN	Bung Moktar Radin	16,842	57.43	▼12.13
Heritage	Mazliwati Abdul Malek	12,512	42.62	▲19.44
Total valid votes		29,354	100.00	
Total rejected ballots		452		
Unreturned ballots		76		
Turnout		29,882	65.56	▼11.91
Registered electors		44,773		
Majority		4,330	14.81	▼29.24
BN hold		Swing		
Source(s) https://lom.agc.gov.my/ilims/upload/portal/akta/outputp/1753262/PUB619_2022.pdf

Malaysian general election, 2018
Party	Candidate	Votes	%	∆%
BN	Bung Moktar Radin	14,465	67.22	▼2.02
Sabah Heritage Party	M A Ghazali Abdul Ghani	4,987	23.18	▲23.18
Sabah People's Hope Party	Mustapa Datu Tambuyong	2,066	9.60	▲9.60
Total valid votes		21,518	100.00	
Total rejected ballots		661		
Unreturned ballots		78		
Turnout		22,257	77.47	▼3.33
Registered electors		28,730		
Majority		9,478	44.05	▼6.35
BN hold		Swing		
Source(s) "His Majesty's Government Gazette - Notice of Contested Election, Parliament for the State of Sabah [P.U. (B) 246/2018]" (PDF). Attorney General's Chambers of Malaysia. 3 May 2018. "Federal Government Gazette - Results of Contested Election and Statements of the Poll after the Official Addition of Votes, Parliamentary Constituencies for the State of Sabah [P.U. (B) 320/2018]" (PDF). Attorney General's Chambers of Malaysia. 28 May 2018. Archived from the original (PDF) on 2019-12-29.

Malaysian general election, 2013
Party	Candidate	Votes	%	∆%
BN	Bung Moktar Radin	13,377	69.29	▼0.42
PKR	Abdullah Abdul Sani	3,646	18.89	▲1.02
STAR	Yambuya Parantis @ Cyril Pongod	1,153	5.97	▲5.97
Independent	Ali Latip Taha	1,130	5.85	▲5.85
Total valid votes		19,306	100.00	
Total rejected ballots		654		
Unreturned ballots		37		
Turnout		19,997	80.80	▲15.27
Registered electors		24,748		
Majority		9,731	50.40	▼1.44
BN hold		Swing		
Source(s) "Federal Government Gazette - Notice of Contested Election, Parliament for the State of Sabah [P.U. (B) 183/2013]" (PDF). Attorney General's Chambers of Malaysia. 26 April 2013. Archived from the original (PDF) on 2018-09-30. "Federal Government Gazette - Results of Contested Election and Statements of the Poll after the Official Addition of Votes, Parliamentary Constituencies for the State of Sabah [P.U. (B) 224/2013]" (PDF). Attorney General's Chambers of Malaysia. 22 May 2013. Archived from the original (PDF) on 2018-09-30.

Malaysian general election, 2008
Party	Candidate	Votes	%	∆%
BN	Bung Moktar Radin	8,507	69.71	
PKR	Ahmad Abdul	2,181	17.87	
Independent	Dasim @ Ricky Jikah	1,515	12.41	
Total valid votes		12,203	100.00	
Total rejected ballots		589		
Unreturned ballots		22		
Turnout		12,814	65.53	
Registered electors		19,554		
Majority		6,326	51.84	
BN hold		Swing		

Malaysian general election, 2004
Party	Candidate	Votes	%	∆%
On the nomination day, Bung Moktar Radin won uncontested.
BN	Bung Moktar Radin			
Total valid votes			100.00	
Total rejected ballots				
Unreturned ballots				
Turnout				
Registered electors		19,441		
Majority				
BN hold		Swing		

Malaysian general election, 1999
Party	Candidate	Votes	%	∆%
BN	Bung Moktar Radin	8,141	65.72	▲7.06
PBS	Ali Latip Taha	4,246	34.28	▼7.06
Total valid votes		12,387	100.00	
Total rejected ballots		210		
Unreturned ballots		19		
Turnout		12,616	58.84	▲0.38
Registered electors		21,438		
Majority		3,895	31.44	▲14.12
BN hold		Swing		

Malaysian general election, 1995
Party	Candidate	Votes	%	∆%
BN	Juhar Mahiruddin	6,431	58.66	▲7.89
PBS	Abdul Malek Chua	4,533	41.34	▲41.34
Total valid votes		10,964	100.00	
Total rejected ballots		234		
Unreturned ballots		4		
Turnout		11,202	58.46	▲18.39
Registered electors		19,162		
Majority		1,898	17.32	▲15.78
BN hold		Swing		

Malaysian general election, 1990
Party	Candidate	Votes	%	∆%
BN	Juhar Mahiruddin	5,473	50.77	▲10.58
Independent	Miyong Hamzah	5,308	49.23	▲49.23
Total valid votes		10,781	100.00	
Total rejected ballots		129		
Unreturned ballots		0		
Turnout		10,910	40.07	▼3.41
Registered electors		27,228		
Majority		165	1.54	▼7.47
BN hold		Swing		

Malaysian general election, 1986
Party	Candidate	Votes	%	∆%
BN	Pitting Mohd Ali	3,273	40.19	
BERJAYA	Abdul Malek Chua	2,539	31.18	
Independent	Nahalan Damsal	2,183	26.81	
Independent	Ismail Talip	149	1.83	
Total valid votes		8,144	100.00	
Total rejected ballots		109		
Unreturned ballots		0		
Turnout		8,253	43.48	
Registered electors		18,979		
Majority		734	9.01	
BN hold		Swing		

Malaysian general election, 1982
Party	Candidate	Votes	%	∆%
On the nomination day, Abdul Ghani Misbah won uncontested.
BN	Abdul Ghani Misbah			
Total valid votes			100.00	
Total rejected ballots				
Unreturned ballots				
Turnout				
Registered electors		15,827		
Majority				
BN hold		Swing		

Malaysian general election, 1978
Party	Candidate	Votes	%	∆%
BN	Abdul Ghani Misbah	4,935	64.08	
Independent	Pengiran Ahmad Pengiran Indar	2,766	35.92	
Total valid votes		7,701	100.00	
Total rejected ballots		230		
Unreturned ballots		0		
Turnout		7,931	61.59	
Registered electors		12,878		
Majority		2,169	28.16	
BN hold		Swing		

Malaysian general election, 1974
Party	Candidate	Votes	%	∆%
On the nomination day, Pengiran Ahmad Pengiran Indar won uncontested.
BN	Pengiran Ahmad Pengiran Indar			
Total valid votes			100.00	
Total rejected ballots				
Unreturned ballots				
Turnout				
Registered electors		10,969		
Majority				
BN gain from USNO		Swing		?

Malaysian general election, 1969
Party	Candidate	Votes	%
On the nomination day, Pengiran Ahmad Pengiran Indar won uncontested.
USNO	Pengiran Ahmad Pengiran Indar		
Total valid votes			100.00
Total rejected ballots			
Unreturned ballots			
Turnout			
Registered electors		11,672	
Majority			
This was a new constituency created.
