= Juhar Mahiruddin =

Yang di-Pertua Negeri of Sabah (2011–2024)

Yang Amat Berbahagia Tun Datuk Seri Panglima Juhar Mahiruddin SMN SPDK SUMW DUPN PJN PGDK ASDK JP
- جوهر ماهرالدين
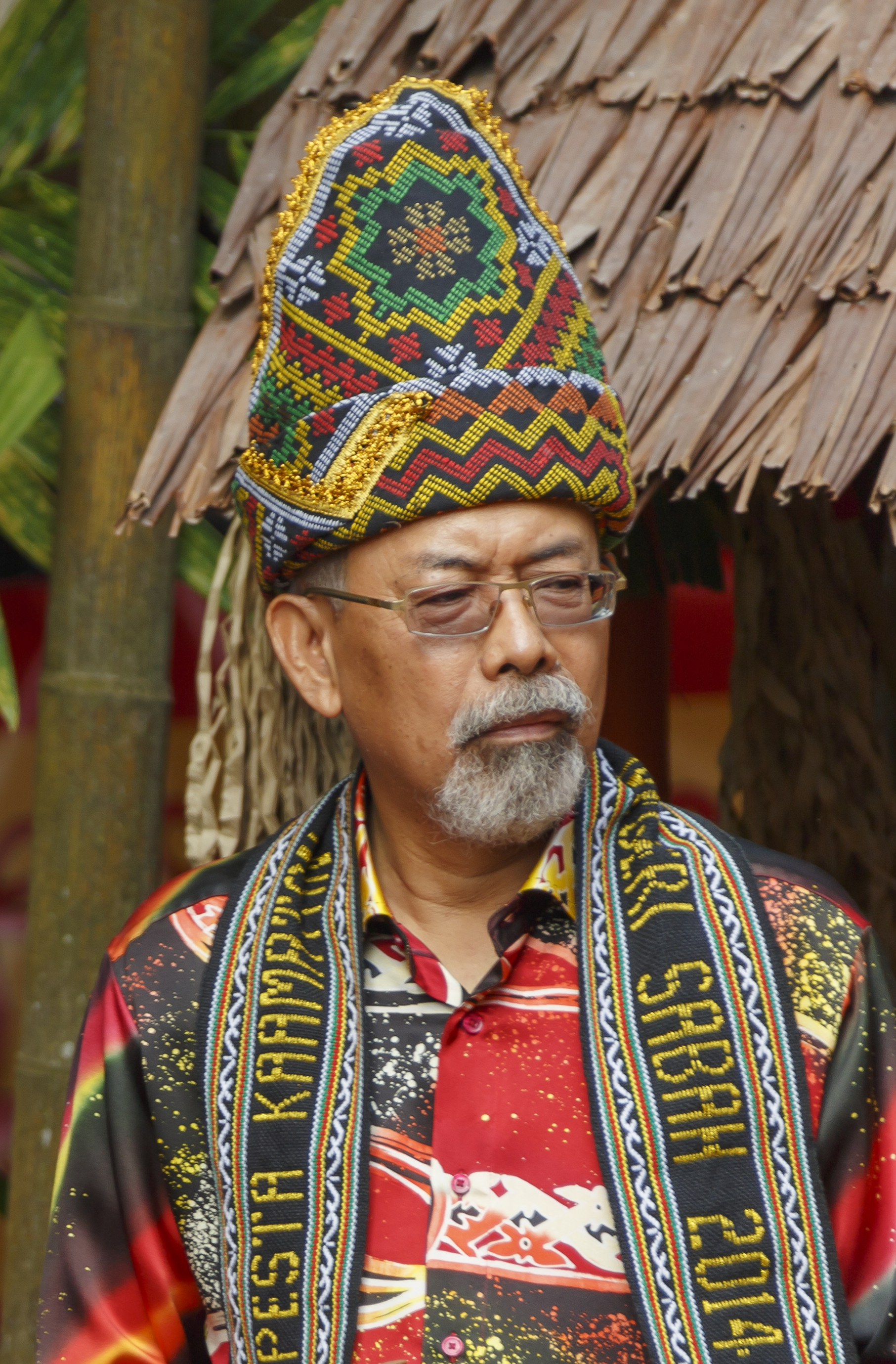

10th Yang di-Pertua Negeri of Sabah
- In office 1 January 2011 – 31 December 2024
- Chief Minister: Musa Aman (2011–2018); Shafie Apdal (2018–2020); Hajiji Noor (2020–2024)
- Preceded by: Ahmadshah Abdullah
- Succeeded by: Musa Aman

Speaker of the Sabah State Legislative Assembly
- In office 15 December 2002 – 31 December 2010
- Preceded by: Hassansaid Alban Sandukong
- Succeeded by: Salleh Said Keruak

Deputy Speaker of the Dewan Rakyat
- In office 5 December 1990 – 10 November 1999 Serving with Ong Tee Keat
- Monarchs: Azlan Shah; Ja'afar; Salahuddin
- Prime Minister: Mahathir Mohamad
- Speaker: Mohamed Zahir Ismail
- Constituency: Kinabatangan

Member of the Malaysian Parliament for Kinabatangan
- In office 21 October 1990 – 29 November 1999
- Preceded by: Pitting Mohd Ali
- Succeeded by: Bung Moktar Radin

Personal details
- Born: Juhar bin Mahiruddin; 5 November 1953 (age 72) Tambisan Island, Sandakan Division, Crown Colony of North Borneo
- Citizenship: Malaysian
- Party: United Sabah National Organisation (USNO); United Malays National Organisation (UMNO); Independent (IND)
- Other political affiliations: Barisan Nasional (BN)
- Spouse: Norlidah R. M. Jasni (b. 1961)
- Relations: Armani Mahiruddin (sister); Al Hambra Juhar (son)
- Education: Wolverhampton Polytechnic (LLB); Lincoln's Inn
- Profession: Lawyer

Juhar bin Mahiruddin (Jawi: جوهر بن ماهرالدين; born 5 November 1953) is a Malaysian politician who served as the 10th Yang di-Pertua Negeri of Sabah from January 2011 to December 2024, Speaker of the Sabah State Legislative Assembly from December 2002 to December 2010, Deputy Speaker of the Dewan Rakyat and Member of Parliament (MP) for Kinabatangan from October 1990 to November 1999. He is also the longest-serving Yang di-Pertua Negeri of Sabah in the history of the state by holding the position for 14 years, Chancellor of the Universiti Malaysia Sabah (UMS) and founding member of the United Malays National Organisation of Sabah (Sabah UMNO).

== Early life and education ==
Juhar was born on Tambisan Island, off the coast of the Sandakan Division in Sabah in 1953 to a political family. His father, Mahiruddin Husin was a member of the United Sabah National Organisation (USNO).

He received his Bachelor of Laws degree from Wolverhampton Polytechnic in 1977 and was called to the Bar at Lincoln's Inn in 1980. He served as a first-class magistrate from 1981 to 1982 and went into private practice from 1982 to 1985.

== Political career ==
Juhar joined USNO, a Barisan Nasional (BN) component party of the time, and campaigned unsuccessfully for office twice, before being elected to Dewan Rakyat for Kinabatangan in October 1990. He was also appointed the Deputy Speaker upon taking his seat in parliament, and served throughout his term as member of parliament.

USNO had been experiencing a decline since 1976, when it lost the state government to the Sabah People's United Front (BERJAYA), which later joined BN. It was disbanded in 1991, and Juhar was involved in negotiations that culminated in the entry of UMNO into Sabah, and the absorption of USNO members into UMNO.

He was not selected to contest the 1999 general election, but remained active in politics. In December 2002, he was appointed the Speaker of the Sabah State Legislative Assembly. He carried on to serve till December 2010, when he was to be appointed the 10th Yang di-Pertua Negeri of Sabah by King Mizan Zainal Abidin. He was sworn in on 1 January 2011.

He was sworn in once again for his second term on the first day in 2015.

In 2018, he was again reappointed the Yang di-Pertua Negeri for the third term.

On 23 December 2022, he was confirmed to be reappointed the Governor of Sabah for his fourth term from 1 January 2023 to 31 December 2024 for 2 years. On 1 January 2023, he was officially sworn in.

== Personal life ==
Juhar is married to Norlidah R. M. Jasni and has four children.

== Election results ==
Parliament of Malaysia
Year	Constituency	Candidate	Votes	Pct	Opponent(s)	Votes	Pct	Ballots cast	Majority	Turnout
1990	P141 Kinabatangan	Juhar Mahiruddin (UMNO)	5,473	50.77%	Miyong Hamzah (IND)	5,308	49.23%	10,910	165	40.07%
1995	P162 Kinabatangan	Juhar Mahiruddin (UMNO)	6,431	58.66%	Abdul Malek Chua (PBS)	4,533	41.34%	11,202	1,898	58.46%

== Honours ==
=== Honours of Malaysia ===
- Malaysia
  - Commander of the Order of Meritorious Service (PJN) – Datuk (1997)
  - Grand Commander of the Order of the Defender of the Realm (SMN) – Tun (2011)
- Federal Territory (Malaysia)
  - Grand Knight of the Order of the Territorial Crown (SUMW) – Datuk Seri Utama (2021)
- Penang
  - Knight Grand Commander of the Order of the Defender of State (DUPN) – Dato' Seri Utama (2022)
- Sabah
  - Grand Commander of the Order of Kinabalu (SPDK) – Datuk Seri Panglima
  - Commander of the Order of Kinabalu (PGDK) – Datuk (1996)
  - Companion of the Order of Kinabalu (ASDK) (1994)
  - Justice of the Peace (JP) (2005)

Political offices
Preceded by Ahmadshah Abdullah	Yang di-Pertua Negeri of Sabah; 2011–2024	Succeeded by Musa Aman
