= Bung Moktar Radin =

Malaysian politician and civil servant (1959–2025)

Yang Berbahagia Datuk Seri Panglima Bung Moktar Radin SSAP SPDK PGDK
- بوڠ مختار راضين

Deputy Chief Minister of Sabah I
- In office 29 September 2020 – 11 January 2023
- Governor: Juhar Mahiruddin
- Chief Minister: Hajiji Noor
- Preceded by: Wilfred Madius Tangau
- Succeeded by: Jeffrey Kitingan
- Constituency: Lamag

State Minister of Works of Sabah
- In office 29 September 2020 – 11 January 2023
- Governor: Juhar Mahiruddin
- Chief Minister: Hajiji Noor
- Preceded by: Position established
- Succeeded by: Shahelmey Yahya
- Constituency: Lamag

Chairman of the FELCRA Berhad
- In office 17 July 2013 – 31 May 2018
- Minister: Najib Razak
- Chief Executive Officer: Zulkarnain Md Eusope

Deputy Chairman of the Barisan Nasional Backbenchers Club
- In office 18 April 2008 – 26 July 2018
- Chairman: Tiong King Sing (2008–2013); Shahrir Abdul Samad (2013–2018)
- Preceded by: Raja Ahmad Zainuddin Raja Omar
- Succeeded by: Position abolished

Member of the Sabah State Legislative Assembly for Lamag
- In office 26 September 2020 – 5 December 2025
- Preceded by: Position established
- Succeeded by: Mohd Ismail Ayob
- Majority: 661 (2020); 153 (2025)

Member of the Malaysian Parliament for Kinabatangan
- In office 29 November 1999 – 5 December 2025
- Preceded by: Juhar Mahiruddin (BN–UMNO)
- Succeeded by: Naim Moktar (BN–UMNO)
- Majority: 3,895 (1999); Walkover (2004); 6,326 (2008); 9,731 (2013); 9,478 (2018); 4,330 (2022)

State Chairman of Barisan Nasional of Sabah
- In office 18 August 2020 – 5 December 2025
- National Chairman: Ahmad Zahid Hamidi
- Preceded by: Musa Aman
- Succeeded by: Arthur Joseph Kurup

State Chairman of the United Malays National Organisation of Sabah
- In office 12 December 2018 – 5 December 2025
- President: Ahmad Zahid Hamidi
- Deputy: Yakub Khan (2018–2023); Abdul Rahman Dahlan (2023–2025)
- Preceded by: Musa Aman
- Succeeded by: Jafry Ariffin

Faction represented in Dewan Rakyat
- 1999–2025: Barisan Nasional

Faction represented in the Sabah State Legislative Assembly
- 2020–2025: Barisan Nasional

Personal details
- Born: Bung Moktar bin Radin; 15 September 1959 Kampung Bilit, Sukau, Kinabatangan, Sandakan Division, Crown Colony of North Borneo
- Died: 5 December 2025 (aged 66) Kota Kinabalu, Sabah, Malaysia
- Resting place: Kampung Likas Muslim Cemetery, Kota Kinabalu, Sabah, Malaysia
- Party: USNO (1980–1990); Sabah UMNO (1990–2025)
- Other political affiliations: Barisan Nasional (BN) (1990–2025)
- Spouses: Nor Asidah Alimudin; Zizie Ezette (polygamous marriage)
- Children: 9, including Naim
- Relatives: Shaheizy Sam (brother-in-law)
- Education: Universiti Kebangsaan Malaysia (MPhil)
- Occupation: Politician; civil servant

Bung Moktar bin Radin (15 September 1959 – 5 December 2025) was a Malaysian politician and civil servant who served as Member of Parliament (MP) for Kinabatangan from 1999 until his death in office in December 2025. A member and former State Chief of UMNO Sabah, Radin served as the Deputy Chief Minister I of Sabah from 2020 to 2023, and represented Lamag in the Sabah State Legislative Assembly from 2020 until his death.

Born in Kinabatangan, Sabah, Radin graduated from Universiti Kebangsaan Malaysia (UKM) and later worked as civil servant before joining politics. An influential figure in Sabah politics, he was the Chairman of Sabah Barisan Nasional and the United Malays National Organisation in Sabah from 2018 to 2025, and the Deputy Chairman of the Barisan Nasional Backbenchers Club (BNBBC) from 2008 to 2018.

== Early life and education ==
Bung Moktar was born in Sukau, Kinabatangan. He attended Kampung Bilit National Primary School, Sandakan National Secondary School, and UKM. He held a Master of Philosophy in Policy Analysis and Security from the latter institution.

== Career ==
=== Civil service ===
Before becoming a Member of Parliament, Bung Moktar served with the Sandakan Special Affairs Department (JASA) branch office from 1987 to 1990, and later worked for the Majlis Amanah Rakyat from 1990 to 1992.

=== Politics ===
Bung Moktar was initially a member of the United Sabah National Organisation (USNO), serving as the Youth Chief of its Kinabatangan division from 1979 to 1990. He retained this role when the party became the Sabahan branch of the peninsular-based UMNO, and later became Sabah UMNO's Youth Information Chief. From 1994 to 1999, he served as Political Secretary to the Minister of Finance of Sabah . In 1996, he became the Division Chief of Kinabatangan.

He first stood as a candidate in the 1994 Sabah state election for Kuamut, an opposition stronghold at that time, and lost. He stood in the 1999 general election and became the member of parliament for Kinabatangan. He retained the seat in the 2004, 2008, 2013, 2018, and 2022 general elections.

Over the course of his political career, Bung Moktar earned a reputation for controversy. His gaffes have been popularly referred to as "bung-le"s.

In 2008, he referred to opposition politician Karpal Singh as a "big monkey" after Singh referred to him as "Bigfoot" in response to Bung Moktar interrupting him. He also called on Karpal, who was a paraplegic, to "Stand up if (he) dare!".

In 2007, while debating the leak in the ceiling of the parliament building, he and fellow member of parliament Mohammad Said Yusof sexually degraded Fong Po Kuan, a member of parliament for Batu Gajah. They claimed she "leaked" every month.

Mana ada bocor? Batu Gajah pun bocor tiap-tiap bulan juga!

What leak? Batu Gajah leaks every month!

The pair offered an apology for their statements but were rejected by Fong, who considered them insincere.

Bung Moktar Radin
(@MyKinabatangan)
tweeted:

WELL DONE..BRAVO...LONG LIVE HITLER...

9 July 2014

In 2014, Bung Moktar tweeted "Long live Hitler" following Germany's 7–1 win over Brazil in the 2014 FIFA World Cup semi-finals. The tweet attracted international news coverage and was declared "unacceptable" by Holger Michael, a German ambassador to Malaysia.

In 2018, when opposition member Willie Mongin alleged that he had visited a casino, Bung Moktar responded:

Apa ni, biadab, ini kurang ajar! Samseng! What you want? You nak gaduh dengan saya? Ini time! Fuck you!

What is this, this rude and ill-mannered (person)! Gangster! What do you want? You want to fight with me? This is the time! Fuck you!

The incident became an internet meme focusing on the combination of Malay language and Bung Moktar's broken English.

Previously just a parliamentary backbencher at the federal level, Bung Moktar entered state politics following Barisan Nasional and UMNO's defeat in the 2018 general election, whereupon the party suffered from crippling high-level defections. He took over and restructured the party in Sabah, and was credited with saving the party. He led the party through the 2020 Sabah state election, taking part in the formation of the subsequent government. He simultaneously served as one of three deputy chief ministers as well as minister of works.

After falling out with chief minister Hajiji Noor, Bung Moktar attempted to engineer a change of government by pulling UMNO's support in the state legislative assembly, resulting in the 2023 Sabah political crisis. The crisis concluded when five UMNO assemblymen defected to Hajiji's coalition, allowing Hajiji to remain in power. Bung Moktar and UMNO shifted to opposition.

He led the party into the 2025 Sabah state election, where it won five seats. It was included in the state government formed by Hajiji. He retained his state seat of Lamag with a majority of 153 votes.

== Personal life ==
Bung Moktar was in a polygamous marriage to Nor Asidah Alimudin and Zizie Ezette Abdul Samad, and had nine children.

His marriage to his second wife was done without the consent of a marriage registrar, for which he was sentenced to a month's imprisonment. He avoided jail time by paying the fine in lieu.

== Illness and death ==
Bung Moktar reportedly fell ill after filing his nomination papers on 15 November 2025. He was hospitalised but released a few days later. Despite being advised to rest, he returned to campaigning for the Sabah state election scheduled for 29 November.

Media outlets reported that Bung Moktar had been hospitalised again on 4 December as a result of a lung infection. He was later revealed to be in critical condition as a result of kidney failure and a lung infection, and died the next day at Kota Kinabalu Gleneagles Hospital. He was 66.

== Election results ==
Sabah State Legislative Assembly
| Year | Constituency | Candidate | Votes | Pct | Opponent(s) | Votes | Pct | Ballots cast | Majority | Turnout |
|---|---|---|---|---|---|---|---|---|---|---|
| 1994 | N23 Kuamut | Bung Moktar Radin (Sabah UMNO) | 1,449 | 37.24% | Joseph Sitin Saang (PBS) | 2,184 | 56.13% | 3,944 | 735 | 72.34% |
| 1994 | N23 Kuamut | Bung Moktar Radin (Sabah UMNO) | 1,449 | 37.24% | Ali Latip Taha (IND) | 258 | 6.63% | 3,944 | 735 | 72.34% |
| 2020 | N58 Lamag | Bung Moktar Radin (Sabah UMNO) | 3,035 | 54.06% | Mohd Ismail Ayob (WARISAN) | 2,374 | 31.40% | 5,614 | 661 | 68.81% |
| 2020 | N58 Lamag | Bung Moktar Radin (Sabah UMNO) | 3,035 | 54.06% | Junny @ Karuak Abdullah (IND) | 73 | 1.47% | 5,614 | 661 | 68.81% |
| 2020 | N58 Lamag | Bung Moktar Radin (Sabah UMNO) | 3,035 | 54.06% | Razman Mayah (PCS) | 71 | 3.32% | 5,614 | 661 | 68.81% |
| 2020 | N58 Lamag | Bung Moktar Radin (Sabah UMNO) | 3,035 | 54.06% | Sairin Abd Rahman (PPRS) | 61 | 1.47% | 5,614 | 661 | 68.81% |
| 2025 | N58 Lamag | Bung Moktar Radin (Sabah UMNO) | 3,908 | 39.14% | Mohd Ismail Ayob (IND) | 3,755 | 37.61% | 9,984 | 153 | 72.04% |
| 2025 | N58 Lamag | Bung Moktar Radin (Sabah UMNO) | 3,908 | 39.14% | Johainizamshah Johari (GAGASAN) | 1,646 | 16.49% | 9,984 | 153 | 72.04% |
| 2025 | N58 Lamag | Bung Moktar Radin (Sabah UMNO) | 3,908 | 39.14% | Mohd Saifulah Lokman (WARISAN) | 372 | 3.73% | 9,984 | 153 | 72.04% |
| 2025 | N58 Lamag | Bung Moktar Radin (Sabah UMNO) | 3,908 | 39.14% | Mazlin Madali (Sabah BERSATU) | 258 | 2.58% | 9,984 | 153 | 72.04% |
| 2025 | N58 Lamag | Bung Moktar Radin (Sabah UMNO) | 3,908 | 39.14% | Salahuddin Anoi (IMPIAN) | 45 | 0.45% | 9,984 | 153 | 72.04% |

Parliament of Malaysia
| Year | Constituency | Candidate | Votes | Pct | Opponent(s) | Votes | Pct | Ballots cast | Majority | Turnout |
|---|---|---|---|---|---|---|---|---|---|---|
| 1999 | P162 Kinabatangan | Bung Moktar Radin (Sabah UMNO) | 8,141 | 65.72% | Ali Latip Taha (PBS) | 4,246 | 34.28% | 12,597 | 3,895 | 58.84% |
| 2004 | P187 Kinabatangan | Bung Moktar Radin (Sabah UMNO) | Unopposed | | | | | | | |
| 2008 | P187 Kinabatangan | Bung Moktar Radin (Sabah UMNO) | 8,507 | 69.71% | Ahmad Abdul (PKR) | 2,181 | 17.87% | 12,792 | 6,326 | 65.53% |
| 2008 | P187 Kinabatangan | Bung Moktar Radin (Sabah UMNO) | 8,507 | 69.71% | Dasim @ Ricky Jikah (IND) | 1,515 | 12.41% | 12,792 | 6,326 | 65.53% |
| 2013 | P187 Kinabatangan | Bung Moktar Radin (Sabah UMNO) | 13,377 | 69.29% | Abdullah Abdul Sani (PKR) | 3,646 | 18.89% | 19,960 | 9,731 | 80.80% |
| 2013 | P187 Kinabatangan | Bung Moktar Radin (Sabah UMNO) | 13,377 | 69.29% | Yambuya Parantis @ Cyril Pongod (STAR) | 1,153 | 12.41% | 19,960 | 9,731 | 80.80% |
| 2013 | P187 Kinabatangan | Bung Moktar Radin (Sabah UMNO) | 13,377 | 69.29% | Ali Latip Taha (IND) | 1,130 | 5.85% | 19,960 | 9,731 | 80.80% |
| 2018 | P187 Kinabatangan | Bung Moktar Radin (Sabah UMNO) | 14,465 | 67.22% | Ghazali Abdul Ghani (WARISAN) | 4,987 | 23.18% | 22,179 | 9,478 | 77.47% |
| 2018 | P187 Kinabatangan | Bung Moktar Radin (Sabah UMNO) | 14,465 | 67.22% | Mustapa Datu Tambuyong (PHRS) | 2,066 | 9.60% | 22,179 | 9,478 | 77.47% |
| 2022 | P187 Kinabatangan | Bung Moktar Radin (Sabah UMNO) | 16,842 | 57.43% | Mazliwati Abdul Malek (WARISAN) | 12,512 | 42.62% | 29,882 | 4,330 | 65.56% |

== Honours ==
=== Honours of Malaysia ===
- Sabah
  - Grand Commander of the Order of Kinabalu (SPDK) – Datuk Seri Panglima (2021)
  - Commander of the Order of Kinabalu (PGDK) – Datuk (2001)
- Pahang
  - Grand Knight of the Order of Sultan Ahmad Shah of Pahang (SSAP) – Dato' Sri (2016)

=== Honorary degrees ===
- Malaysia
  - Honorary Ph.D. degree in Political Science from Jesselton University College (2022)

== See also ==
- List of longest-serving members of the Parliament of Malaysia
