= Lamag =

State constituency in Sabah, Malaysia

Sabah constituency

State constituency
- Legislature: Sabah State Legislative Assembly
MLA
Mohd Ismail Ayob
BN
- Constituency created: 1967
- Constituency abolished: 1976
- Constituency re-created: 2019
- First contested: 1967
- Last contested: 2026

Demographics
- Population (2020): 56,395
- Electors (2025): 13,899

Lamag is a state constituency in Sabah, Malaysia, that is represented in the Sabah State Legislative Assembly. This is one of the thirteen new state constituencies as result of approval from the state legislature and Dewan Rakyat on 17 July 2019 and was contested for the first time in the 2020 Sabah state election.

== Demographics ==
As of 2020, Lamag has a population of 56,395 people.

Ethnic breakdown of Lamag's electorate as of 2025
1. Muslim Bumiputera (86.0%)
2. Non-Muslim Bumiputera (13.6%)
3. Chinese (0.40%)
4. Other ethnicities (0.00%)

== History ==
=== Polling districts ===
According to the gazette issued on 31 October 2022, the Lamag constituency has a total of 6 polling districts.

State constituency	Polling Districts	Code	Location
Lamag（N58）	Buang Sayang	187/58/01	SK Buang Sayang
Lamag（N58）	Bukit Garam	187/58/02	SK Bukit Garam
Lamag（N58）	Lamag	187/58/03	SK Sangau
Lamag（N58）	Balat	187/58/04	SK Balat
Lamag（N58）	Kota Kinabatangan	187/58/05	SK Bukit Garam II
Lamag（N58）	Usaha Jaya	187/58/06	SK Kota Kinabatangan

=== Representation history ===
Members of the Legislative Assembly for Lamag
Assembly	No	Years	Member	Party
Constituency created
3rd	N28	1967-1971	Gaipam Indar	USNO
4th	N28	1971-1976	Pg Mohd Ismail Pg Siat	USNO
Constituency abolished, split into Kuamut and Kuala Kinabatangan
Constituency recreated from Kuamut and Sukau
16th	N58	2020–2025	Bung Moktar Radin	BN (UMNO)
17th	N58	2025	Bung Moktar Radin	BN (UMNO)
17th	N58	2026–present	Mohd Ismail Ayob	BN (UMNO)

== Election results ==
Sabah state by-election, 24 January 2026: Lamag Upon the death of the incumbent, Bung Moktar Radin
Party	Candidate	Votes	%	∆%
BN	Mohd Ismail Ayob	7,269	82.07	▲42.93
Heritage	Mazliwati Abdul Malek	1,588	17.93	▲14.50
Total valid votes		8,857	100.00	
Total rejected ballots		160		
Unreturned ballots		7		
Turnout		9,024	64.93	▼8.10
Registered electors		13,899		
Majority		5,681	64.14	▲62.61
BN hold		Swing		

Source of Elector Count is from Tindak Malaysia Facebook Post

Sabah state election, 2025: Lamag
Party	Candidate	Votes	%	∆%
BN	Bung Moktar Radin	3,908	39.14	▼13.42
Independent	Mohd Ismail Ayob	3,755	37.61	▲37.61
GRS	Johainizamshah Johari	1,646	16.49	▲16.49
Heritage	Mohd Saifulah Lokman	372	3.73	▼37.39
PN	Mazlin Madali	258	2.58	▲2.58
Sabah Dream Party	Salahuddin Anoi	45	0.45	▲0.45
Total valid votes		9,984		
Total rejected ballots		129		
Unreturned ballots		8		
Turnout		10,121	73.03	▲2.26
Registered electors		13,859		
Majority		153	1.53	▼9.91
BN hold		Swing		
Source(s) "RESULTS OF CONTESTED ELECTION AND STATEMENTS OF THE POLL AFTER THE OFFICIAL ADDITION OF VOTES" (PDF).

Sabah state election, 2020: Lamag
Party	Candidate	Votes	%	∆%
BN	Bung Moktar Radin	3,035	52.56	
Sabah Heritage Party	Mohd Ismail Ayob	2,374	41.12	
Independent	Junny @ Karuak Abdullah	73	1.26	
Love Sabah Party	Razman Mayah	71	1.23	
Sabah People's Unity Party	Sairin Abd Rahman	61	1.06	
Total valid votes		5,614	97.23	
Total rejected ballots		144	2.49	
Unreturned ballots		16	0.28	
Turnout		5,774	70.77	
Registered electors		8,159		
Majority		661	11.44	
BN hold		Swing		
Source(s) "RESULTS OF CONTESTED ELECTION AND STATEMENTS OF THE POLL AFTER THE OFFICIAL ADDITION OF VOTES".

Sabah state election, 1971: Lamag
Party	Candidate	Votes	%	∆%
On the nomination day, Mohd. Ismail Siat won uncontested.
USNO	Mohd. Ismail Siat			
Total valid votes			100.00	
Total rejected ballots				
Unreturned ballots				
Turnout				
Registered electors				
Majority				
USNO hold		Swing		

Sabah state election, 1967: Lamag
Party	Candidate	Votes	%
USNO	Galpam Indar	2,687	67.19
UPKO	Philip Niun	1,312	32.81
Total valid votes		3,999	100.00
Total rejected ballots		72	
Unreturned ballots		0	
Turnout		4,071	83.37
Registered electors		4,883	
Majority		1,375	34.38
This was a new constituency created.
