= Sukau =

State constituency in Sabah, Malaysia

Sukau (N58)
Sabah constituency

State constituency
- Legislature: Sabah State Legislative Assembly
MLA
Jafry Ariffin
BN
- Constituency created: 1984
- First contested: 1986
- Last contested: 2025

Demographics
- Population (2020): 113,165
- Electors (2025): 16,541

Sukau is a state constituency in Sabah, Malaysia, that is represented in the Sabah State Legislative Assembly.

== Demographics ==
As of 2020, Sukau has a population of 113,165 people.

Ethnic breakdown of Sukau's electorate as of 2025
1. Muslim Bumiputera (93.0%)
2. Non-Muslim Bumiputera (6.00%)
3. Chinese (0.60%)
4. Other ethnicities (0.41%)

== History ==
=== Polling districts ===
According to the gazette issued on 31 October 2022, the Sukau constituency has a total of 11 polling districts.

State constituency	Polling Districts	Code	Location
Sukau（N59）	Tanjung Aru	187/59/01	SK Tanjong Aru
Sukau（N59）	Mumiang	187/59/02	Dewan Kampung Mumiang
Sukau（N59）	Lubukan	187/59/03	SK Pulau Lubukan
Sukau（N59）	Suan Lamba	187/59/04	SK Rancangan Suan Lamba
Sukau（N59）	Batu Puteh	187/59/05	SK Batu Puteh
Sukau（N59）	Paris	187/59/06	SK Paris
Sukau（N59）	Bilit	187/59/07	SK Bilit
Sukau（N59）	Sukau	187/59/08	SK Sukau
Sukau（N59）	Abai	187/59/09	SK Abai
Sukau（N59）	Tundun Bohangin	187/59/10	SK Tundun Bohangin
Sukau（N59）	Lintang	187/59/11	SK Lintang; SK Sri Ganda; SK Ladang Tomanggong

=== Representation history ===
Member of Sabah State Legislative Assembly for Sukau
Assembly	No	Years	Member	Party
Constituency created from Sekong and Kuala Kinabatangan
7th	N22	1985–1986	Saman Gulam	USNO
7th	N22	1986	Zaki Gusmiah	USNO
8th	N22	1986	Zaki Gusmiah	USNO
8th	N22	1986–1990	Zaki Gusmiah	BN (USNO)
9th	N22	1990–1994	Aklee Abass	BN (USNO)
10th	N22	1994–1999	Aklee Abass	BN (UMNO)
11th	N39	1999–2004	Aklee Abass	BN (UMNO)
12th	N48	2004–2008	Aklee Abass	BN (UMNO)
13th	N48	2008–2013	Saddi Abdul Rahman	BN (UMNO)
14th	N48	2013–2018	Saddi Abdul Rahman	BN (UMNO)
15th	N48	2018	Saddi Abdul Rahman	BN (UMNO)
15th	N48	2018	Saddi Abdul Rahman	Independent
15th	N48	2018–2020	Saddi Abdul Rahman	WARISAN
15th	N48	2020	Saddi Abdul Rahman	Independent
16th	N59	2020–2025	Jafry Ariffin	BN (UMNO)
17th	N59	2025–present	Jafry Ariffin	BN (UMNO)

== Election results ==
Sabah state election, 2025: Sukau
Party	Candidate	Votes	%	∆%
BN	Jafry Ariffin	5,143	45.68	▼8.11
GRS	Juhari Janan	3,909	34.72	▲34.72
Heritage	Azhari Rangon	1,605	14.26	▼9.10
PN	Pengiran Petra Pengiran Asri	381	3.38	▲3.38
Sabah Dream Party	Roslan Madali	118	1.05	▲1.05
Pejuangan Rakyat	Nordin Damit	54	0.48	▲0.48
Sabah Nationality Party	Afiq Anwari Zulkifli	48	0.43	▲0.43
Total valid votes		11,258		
Total rejected ballots		235		
Unreturned ballots		6		
Turnout		11,499	69.52	▼4.80
Registered electors		16,541		
Majority		1,234	10.96	▼19.47
BN hold		Swing		
Source(s) "RESULTS OF CONTESTED ELECTION AND STATEMENTS OF THE POLL AFTER THE OFFICIAL ADDITION OF VOTES" (PDF).

Sabah state election, 2020: Sukau
Party	Candidate	Votes	%	∆%
BN	Jafry Ariffin	3,763	53.79	▼3.30
Sabah Heritage Party	Amrah Liwangsa	1,634	23.36	▼13.78
Independent	Saddi Abdul Rahman	1,228	17.55	▲17.55
Love Sabah Party	Malaya Kasurah	94	1.34	▲1.34
GAGASAN	Jakariah Janit	41	0.59	▲0.59
Total valid votes		6,760	96.63	
Total rejected ballots		220	3.14	
Unreturned ballots		16	0.23	
Turnout		6,996	64.72	▼10.48
Registered electors		10,810		
Majority		2,129	30.43	▲10.48
BN hold		Swing		
Source(s) "RESULTS OF CONTESTED ELECTION AND STATEMENTS OF THE POLL AFTER THE OFFICIAL ADDITION OF VOTES".

Sabah state election, 2018: Sukau
Party	Candidate	Votes	%	∆%
BN	Saddi Abdul Rahman	4,660	57.09	▼17.68
Sabah Heritage Party	Mohd Ismail Ayob	3,032	37.14	▲37.14
Sabah People's Hope Party	Muariffidin Abdul Malek	117	1.43	▲1.43
Sabah People's Unity Party	Abdulgani Kosui	71	0.87	▲0.87
Total valid votes		7,880	96.53	
Total rejected ballots		253	3.10	
Unreturned ballots		30	0.37	
Turnout		8,163	75.20	▼4.38
Registered electors		10,855		
Majority		1,628	19.95	▼36.52
BN hold		Swing		
Source(s) "RESULTS OF CONTESTED ELECTION AND STATEMENTS OF THE POLL AFTER THE OFFICIAL ADDITION OF VOTES".

Sabah state election, 2013: Sukau
Party	Candidate	Votes	%	∆%
BN	Saddi Abdul Rahman	5,851	74.77	▲10.98
PAS	Ahdah Sulaiman	1,432	18.30	▲16.82
STAR	Juhori Paritai	197	2.52	▲2.52
SAPP	Aprin Musin	89	1.14	▲1.14
Total valid votes		7,569	97.28	
Total rejected ballots		244	3.12	
Unreturned ballots		12	0.15	
Turnout		7,825	79.58	▲16.64
Registered electors		9,833		
Majority		4,419	56.47	▲15.47
BN hold		Swing		
Source(s) "KEPUTUSAN PILIHAN RAYA UMUM DEWAN UNDANGAN NEGERI".

Sabah state election, 2008: Sukau
Party	Candidate	Votes	%	∆%
BN	Saddi Abdul Rahman	3,278	63.79	▼12.87
Independent	Ahdah Sulaiman	1,171	22.79	▲22.79
Independent	Jakariah Janit	86	1.67	▲1.67
BERSEKUTU	Awang @ Roslan	85	1.65	▲1.65
PAS	Imran Ibrahim	76	1.48	▼19.95
Independent	Jahran Gani	57	1.11	▲1.11
Independent	Abdulgani Kosui	41	0.80	▲0.80
Independent	Yusof Nasir	19	0.37	▲0.37
Total valid votes		4,813	93.66	
Total rejected ballots		324	6.30	
Unreturned ballots		2	0.04	
Turnout		5,139	62.94	▲6.78
Registered electors		8,165		
Majority		2,107	41.00	▼14.23
BN hold		Swing		
Source(s) "KEPUTUSAN PILIHAN RAYA UMUM DEWAN UNDANGAN NEGERI SABAH BAGI TAHUN 2008".

Sabah state election, 2004: Sukau
Party	Candidate	Votes	%	∆%
BN	Aklee Abass	3,678	76.66	▲17.11
PAS	Awang @ Roslan	1,028	21.43	▲19.55
Total valid votes		4,706	98.08	
Total rejected ballots		92	1.92	
Unreturned ballots		0	0.00	
Turnout		4,798	56.16	▼3.40
Registered electors		8,544		
Majority		2,650	55.23	▲18.36
BN hold		Swing		
Source(s) "KEPUTUSAN PILIHAN RAYA UMUM DEWAN UNDANGAN NEGERI SABAH BAGI TAHUN 2004".

Sabah state election, 1999: Sukau
Party	Candidate	Votes	%	∆%
BN	Aklee Abass	3,988	59.55	▼3.41
BERSEKUTU	Pusing Baligang	1,519	22.68	▲22.68
PBS	Mahlan Adari	816	12.18	▼29.35
PAS	Ridwan Baharun	126	1.88	▲1.88
Independent	Halban Janan	101	1.51	▲1.51
Total valid votes		6,550	97.80	
Total rejected ballots		147	2.20	
Unreturned ballots		0	0.00	
Turnout		6,697	59.56	▼1.70
Registered electors		11,245		
Majority		2,469	36.87	▲22.26
BN hold		Swing		
Source(s) "KEPUTUSAN PILIHAN RAYA UMUM DEWAN UNDANGAN NEGERI SABAH BAGI TAHUN 1999".

Sabah state election, 1994: Sukau
Party	Candidate	Votes	%	∆%
BN	Aklee Abass	3,504	56.14	▲10.46
PBS	Zakaria Gusmiah	2,592	41.53	▼1.91
SETIA	Ali Ayau	50	0.80	▲0.80
Total valid votes		6,146	98.48	
Total rejected ballots		95	1.52	
Unreturned ballots		0	0.00	
Turnout		6,241	61.26	▲4.13
Registered electors		10,187		
Majority		912	14.61	▲12.37
BN hold		Swing		
Source(s) "KEPUTUSAN PILIHAN RAYA UMUM DEWAN UNDANGAN NEGERI SABAH BAGI TAHUN 1994".

Sabah state election, 1990: Sukau
Party	Candidate	Votes	%	∆%
BN	Aklee Abass	1,897	45.68	▼17.71
PBS	Zakaria Gusmiah	1,804	43.44	▼7.98
BERJAYA	Adinin Bachu	305	7.34	▲7.34
Sabah People's Party	Mohamad Alimin Mohd Amin	87	2.09	▲2.09
Total valid votes		4,093	98.56	
Total rejected ballots		60	1.44	
Unreturned ballots		0	0.00	
Turnout		4,153	57.13	▲4.90
Registered electors		7,269		
Majority		93	2.24	▼25.69
BN hold		Swing		
Source(s) "KEPUTUSAN PILIHAN RAYA UMUM DEWAN UNDANGAN NEGERI SABAH BAGI TAHUN 1990".

Sabah state election, 1986: Sukau
Party	Candidate	Votes	%	∆%
USNO	Zakaria Gusmiah	1,995	63.39	▲21.95
PBS	Saman Gulam	1,116	35.46	▲35.46
Total valid votes		3,111	98.86	
Total rejected ballots		36	1.14	
Unreturned ballots		0	0.00	
Turnout		3,147	52.23	▲0.04
Registered electors		6,025		
Majority		879	27.93	▲26.33
USNO hold		Swing		
Source(s) "KEPUTUSAN PILIHAN RAYA UMUM DEWAN UNDANGAN NEGERI SABAH BAGI TAHUN 1986".

Sabah state election, 1985: Sukau
Party	Candidate	Votes	%
USNO	Saman Gulam	1,213	41.44
BERJAYA	Kolnah Sahih	1,166	39.84
BERSIH	Juhar Mahiruddin	268	9.16
PBS	Murni Kamrun	181	6.19
BERSEPADU	Ghani Medeh	88	3.00
Independent	Amran Tunggor	11	0.37
Total valid votes		2,927	100.00
Total rejected ballots		98	
Unreturned ballots		0	
Turnout		3,025	52.19
Registered electors		5,796	
Majority		47	1.60
This was a new seat created.
