= 16th Sabah State Legislative Assembly =

2020–2025 term of the legislature of Sabah, Malaysia

←	15th Assembly	17th Assembly	→
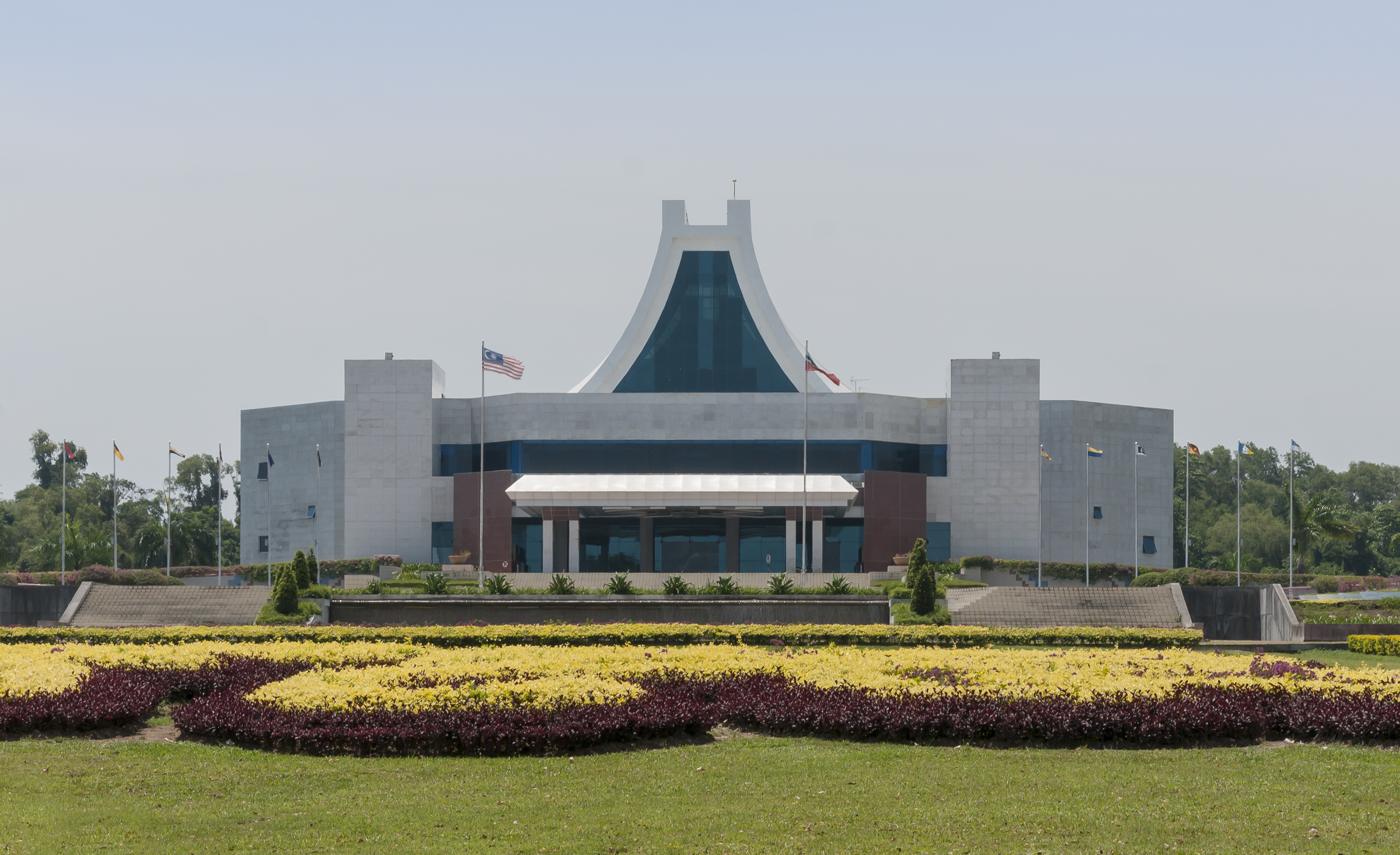

Overview
- Legislative body: Sabah State Legislative Assembly
- Jurisdiction: Sabah
- Meeting place: Sabah State Legislative Assembly Building
- Term: 9 October 2020 – 6 October 2025
- Election: 2020 state election
- Government: Cabinet of Sabah
- Website: www.sabah.gov.my/dun
- Members: 73 elected members + 6 nominated members
- Speaker: Kadzim M Yahya
- Secretary: Rafidah Maqbol Rahman
- Government Leader: Hajiji Noor
- Opposition Leader: Shafie Apdal
- Party control: Gabungan Rakyat Sabah

Head of State
- Yang di-Pertua Negeri: Juhar Mahiruddin (2020–2024); Musa Aman (2025)

Sessions
- 1st: 1st Meeting: 9 October 2020; 2nd Meeting: 18 December 2020 - 23 December 2020
- 2nd: 1st Meeting: 21 September 2021 - 23 September 2021; 2nd Meeting: 3 December 2021 - 9 December 2021
- 3rd: 1st Meeting: 16 March 2022 – 24 March 2022; 2nd Meeting: 18 July 2022 - 21 July 2022; 3rd Meeting: 21 November 2022 - 9 December 2022; Special Meeting: 10 January 2023
- 4th: 1st Meeting: 22 May 2023 - 25 May 2023; 2nd Meeting: 8 August 2023 - 10 August 2023; 3rd Meeting: 24 November 2023 - 30 November 2023; Special Meeting: 3 January 2024
- 5th: 1st Meeting: 18 April 2024 - 25 April 2024; 2nd Meeting: 9 July 2024 - 11 July 2024; 3rd Meeting: 15 November 2024 - 21 November 2024
- 6th: 1st Meeting: 10 April 2025 - 17 April 2025; 2nd Meeting: 7 July 2025 - 8 July 2025

The 16th Sabah State Legislative Assembly was the term of the Sabah State Legislative Assembly, the legislative branch of the Government of Sabah in Sabah, Malaysia. The 16th Assembly comprises 79 members, of whom 73 were elected in the 2020 Sabah State Election, and 6 were appointed by the Government. The term of the 16th Assembly began on 9 October 2020 and ended upon its dissolution on 6 October 2025 ahead of the next state election.

== Background ==
Gabungan Rakyat Sabah (GRS) coalition won the election with a simple majority of 42 seats. The coalition consists of Parti Gagasan Rakyat Sabah (GAGASAN) (26), Homeland Solidarity Party (STAR) (6), United Sabah Party (PBS) (7), United Sabah National Organisation (USNO) (0), Sabah People's Hope Party (PHRS) (1), Liberal Democratic Party (LDP) (0), Love Sabah Party (PCS) (0) and Sabah Progressive Party (SAPP) (1). GRS also has 1 direct member representatives from N.21 Limbahau. Hajiji Noor from GAGASAN-GRS was sworn in as Chief Minister 3 days later.

== Officeholders ==
=== Speakership ===
- Speaker: Kadzim Yahya (non-MLA)
- Deputy Speaker:
  - Al Hambra Juhar (non-MLA)
  - Richard Yong Ke Wong (non-MLA)

=== Other parliamentary officers ===
- Secretary: Rafidah Maqbol Rahman
- Deputy Secretary: Jayreh Jaya
- Serjeants-at-Arms: Mohd Sabri Metan
- Deputy Serjeants-at-Arms: Mahar Rungkim

=== Party leaders ===
==== Government ====
- Leader of the Gabungan Rakyat Sabah (GRS) and the component party, Parti Gagasan Rakyat Sabah (GAGASAN):
  Hajiji Noor (Chief Minister & Sulaman MLA)
  - Leader of the Homeland Solidarity Party (STAR):
    Jeffrey Kitingan (Deputy Chief Minister I & Tambunan MLA)
  - Acting Leader of the United Sabah Party (PBS):
    Joachim Gunsalam (Deputy Chief Minister II & Kundasang MLA)
  - Leader of the Sabah Progressive Party (SAPP):
    Yong Teck Lee (Nominated MLA)
- Leader of the Pakatan Harapan (PH) of Sabah and United Progressive Kinabalu Organisation (UPKO) :
  Ewon Benedick (Kadamaian MLA)
  - Leader of the Democratic Action Party (DAP) of Sabah:
    Phoong Jin Zhe (State Minister of Industrial Development and Entrepreneurship & Luyang MLA)
- Leader of the Malaysian Islamic Party (PAS) of Sabah:
  Aliakbar Gulasan (Nominated MLA)

==== Opposition ====
- Leader of the Heritage Party (WARISAN) of Sabah:
  Shafie Apdal (Leader of the Opposition & Senallang MLA)
- Leader of the Barisan Nasional (BN) of Sabah and United Malays National Organisation (UMNO) of Sabah :
  Bung Moktar Radin (Lamag MLA)

=== Whips ===
- Government Whip: Yusof Yacob
- Opposition Whip:

Constituency map showing current standings by party

== Current composition ==
↓
Gabungan Rakyat Sabah-led government (65)												Opposition (14)
42						13	7			2	1	14
Gabungan Rakyat Sabah						Barisan Nasional	Pakatan Harapan			KDM	Perikatan Nasional	WARISAN
26	7	6	1	1	1	13	4	2	1	2	1	14
GAGASAN	PBS	STAR	SAPP	PHRS	Direct	UMNO	DAP	PKR	UPKO	KDM	PAS	WARISAN
Sabah State Legislative Assembly, 21 May 2023 (79 seats)

No.	Parliamentary constituency	No.	State Constituency	Member	Coalition (Party)	Position
P167	Kudat	N01	Banggi	Mohammad Mohamarin	GRS (GAGASAN)	
P167	Kudat	N02	Bengkoka	Harun Durabi	BN (UMNO)	Assistant Minister of Science, Technology and Innovation
P167	Kudat	N03	Pitas	Ruddy Awah	GRS (GAGASAN)	Assistant Minister of Rural Development
P167	Kudat	N04	Tanjong Kapor	Ben Chong Chen Bin	GRS (GAGASAN)	
P168	Kota Marudu	N05	Matunggong	Julita Majungki	GRS (PBS)	Assistant Minister of Finance
P168	Kota Marudu	N06	Bandau	Wetrom Bahanda	KDM	MP for Kota Marudu
P168	Kota Marudu	N07	Tandek	Hendrus Anding	GRS (PBS)	Assistant Minister of Agriculture and Fisheries
P169	Kota Belud	N08	Pintasan	Fairuz Renddan	GRS (GAGASAN)	Assistant Minister of Youth and Sports
P169	Kota Belud	N09	Tempasuk	Mohd Arsad Bistari	GRS (GAGASAN)	
P169	Kota Belud	N10	Usukan	Salleh Said Keruak	BN (UMNO)	Former Chief Minister of Sabah
P169	Kota Belud	N11	Kadamaian	Ewon Benedick	PH (UPKO)	MP for Penampang; Federal Minister
P170	Tuaran	N12	Sulaman	Hajiji Noor	GRS (GAGASAN)	Chief Minister
P170	Tuaran	N13	Pantai Dalit	Jasnih Daya	GRS (GAGASAN)	
P170	Tuaran	N14	Tamparuli	Jahid Jahim	GRS (PBS)	Minister of Rural Development
P170	Tuaran	N15	Kiulu	Joniston Bangkuai	GRS (PBS)	Assistant Minister of Tourism, Culture and Environment
P171	Sepanggar	N16	Karambunai	Yakubah Khan	BN (UMNO)	
P171	Sepanggar	N17	Darau	Azhar Matussin	WARISAN	
P171	Sepanggar	N18	Inanam	Peto Galim	PH (PKR)	Assistant Minister of Agriculture, Fisheries and Food Industry
P172	Kota Kinabalu	N19	Likas	Tan Lee Fatt	PH (DAP)	Assistant Minister of Finance
P172	Kota Kinabalu	N20	Api-Api	Christina Liew Chin Jin	PH (PKR)	Minister of Tourism, Culture and Environment
P172	Kota Kinabalu	N21	Luyang	Phoong Jin Zhe	PH (DAP)	Minister of Industrial Development and Entrepreneurship
P173	Putatan	N22	Tanjung Aru	Junz Wong	WARISAN	
P173	Putatan	N23	Petagas	Awang Ahmad Sah Awang Sahari	GRS (GAGASAN)	
P173	Putatan	N24	Tanjung Keramat	Shahelmey Yahya	BN (UMNO)	Deputy Chief Minister III; Minister of Works; MP for Putatan
P174	Penampang	N25	Kapayan	Jannie Lasimbang	PH (DAP)	
P174	Penampang	N26	Moyog	Darell Leiking	WARISAN	
P175	Papar	N27	Limbahau	Juil Nuatim	GRS	
P175	Papar	N28	Kawang	Gulamhaidar @ Yusof Khan Bahadar	GRS (GAGASAN)	
P175	Papar	N29	Pantai Manis	Mohd Tamin Zainal	BN (UMNO)	
P176	Kimanis	N30	Bongawan	Daud Yusof	WARISAN	
P176	Kimanis	N31	Membakut	Mohd Arifin Mohd Arif	GRS (GAGASAN)	Minister of Science, Technology and Innovation
P177	Beaufort	N32	Klias	Isnin Aliasnih	GRS (GAGASAN)	Assistant Minister of Housing and Local Government
P177	Beaufort	N33	Kuala Penyu	Limus Jury	GRS (GAGASAN)	Assistant Minister of Works
P178	Sipitang	N34	Lumadan	Ruslan Muharam	GRS (PBS)	Assistant Minister to the Chief Minister
P178	Sipitang	N35	Sindumin	Yusof Yacob	GRS (GAGASAN)	GRS-PH Chief Whip
P179	Ranau	N36	Kundasang	Joachim Gunsalam	GRS (PBS)	Deputy Chief Minister II; Minister of Housing and Local Government
P179	Ranau	N37	Karanaan	Masidi Manjun	GRS (GAGASAN)	Minister of Finance
P179	Ranau	N38	Paginatan	Abidin Madingkir	STAR	Assistant Minister to the Chief Minister
P180	Keningau	N39	Tambunan	Jeffrey Gapari Kitingan	STAR	Deputy Chief Minister I; Minister of Agriculture, Fisheries and Food Industry; MP for Keningau
P180	Keningau	N40	Bingkor	Robert Tawik	STAR	Assistant Minister of Works
P180	Keningau	N41	Liawan	Annuar Ayub Aman	STAR	
P181	Tenom	N42	Melalap	Vacant (Note: The seat incumbent Peter Anthony (KDM) was disqualified after being sentenced to jail for falsifying documents on 4 March 2025.)		
P181	Tenom	N43	Kemabong	Rubin Balang	GRS (GAGASAN)	
P182	Pensiangan	N44	Tulid	Flovia Ng	STAR	Assistant Minister of Community Development and People's Wellbeing
P182	Pensiangan	N45	Sook	Ellron Alfred Angin	STAR	Minister of Youth and Sports
P182	Pensiangan	N46	Nabawan	Abdul Ghani Mohamed Yassin	GRS (GAGASAN)	
P183	Beluran	N47	Telupid	Jonnybone Kurum	GRS (PBS)	
P183	Beluran	N48	Sugut	James Ratib	GRS (GAGASAN)	Minister of Community Development and People's Wellbeing
P183	Beluran	N49	Labuk	Samad Jambri	GRS (GAGASAN)	Assistant Minister of Rural Development
P184	Libaran	N50	Gum-Gum	Arunarsin Taib	WARISAN	
P184	Libaran	N51	Sungai Manila	Mokran Ingkat	BN (UMNO)	
P184	Libaran	N52	Sungai Sibuga	Vacant (Note: The seat incumbent Mohamad Hamsan Awang Supain (BN-UMNO) died from kidney failure on 19 January 2025.)		
P185	Batu Sapi	N53	Sekong	Alias Sani	WARISAN	
P185	Batu Sapi	N54	Karamunting	George Hiew Vun Zin	GRS (GAGASAN)	
P186	Sandakan	N55	Elopura	Calvin Chong Ket Kiun	WARISAN	
P186	Sandakan	N56	Tanjong Papat	Frankie Poon Ming Fung	PH (DAP)	
P187	Kinabatangan	N57	Kuamut	Masiung Banah	GRS (GAGASAN)	
P187	Kinabatangan	N58	Lamag	Bung Moktar Radin	BN (UMNO)	MP for Kinabatangan
P187	Kinabatangan	N59	Sukau	Jafry Ariffin	BN (UMNO)	
P188	Lahad Datu	N60	Tungku	Assaffal P. Alian	WARISAN	
P188	Lahad Datu	N61	Segama	Mohamaddin Ketapi	BN (UMNO)	
P188	Lahad Datu	N62	Silam	Dumi Pg. Masdal	WARISAN	
P188	Lahad Datu	N63	Kunak	Norazlinah Arif	GRS (GAGASAN)	
P189	Semporna	N64	Sulabayan	Jaujan Sambakong	WARISAN	
P189	Semporna	N65	Senallang	Shafie Apdal	WARISAN	Leader of the Opposition; Former Chief Minister of Sabah; MP for Semporna
P189	Semporna	N66	Bugaya	Jamil Hamzah	WARISAN	
P190	Tawau	N67	Balung	Hamid Awang	GRS (GAGASAN)	
P190	Tawau	N68	Apas	Nizam Abu Bakar Titingan	GRS (GAGASAN)	Assistant Minister to the Chief Minister
P190	Tawau	N69	Sri Tanjong	Justin Wong Yung Bin	WARISAN	
P191	Kalabakan	N70	Kukusan	Rina Jainal	GRS (PHRS)	
P191	Kalabakan	N71	Tanjong Batu	Andi Muhammad Suryandy Bandy	BN (UMNO)	Assistant Minister of Industrial Development and Entrepreneurship; MP for Kalabakan
P191	Kalabakan	N72	Merotai	Sarifuddin Hata	WARISAN	
P191	Kalabakan	N73	Sebatik	Hassan A. Gani Pg. Amir	GRS (GAGASAN)	
N/A	N/A	—	Nominated member	Suhaimi Nasir	BN (UMNO)	MP for Libaran
N/A	N/A	—	Nominated member	Raime Unggi	BN (UMNO)	
N/A	N/A	—	Nominated member	Jaffari Waliam	GRS (GAGASAN)	
N/A	N/A	—	Nominated member	Aliakbar Gulasan	PN (PAS)	
N/A	N/A	—	Nominated member	Amisah Yassin	GRS (GAGASAN)	
N/A	N/A	—	Nominated member	Yong Teck Lee	SAPP	Former Chief Minister of Sabah

List of seats that changed allegiance in Sabah after state election 2020
No.	Seat	Member	Previous Party (2020 state election)	Current Party (as of May 2023)
N01	Banggi	Mohammad Mohamarin	WARISAN	Gabungan Rakyat Sabah (GAGASAN)
N03	Pitas	Ruddy Awah	Independent	Gabungan Rakyat Sabah (GAGASAN)
N04	Tanjong Kapor	Ben Chong Chen Bin	WARISAN	Gabungan Rakyat Sabah (GAGASAN)
N06	Bandau	Wetrom Bahanda	Perikatan Nasional (BERSATU)	KDM
N08	Pintasan	Fairuz Renddan	Perikatan Nasional (BERSATU)	Gabungan Rakyat Sabah (GAGASAN)
N09	Tempasuk	Mohd Arsad Bistari	Barisan Nasional (UMNO)	Gabungan Rakyat Sabah (GAGASAN)
N11	Kadamaian	Ewon Benedick	UPKO	Pakatan Harapan (UPKO)
N12	Sulaman	Hajiji Noor	Perikatan Nasional (BERSATU)	Gabungan Rakyat Sabah (GAGASAN)
N13	Pantai Dalit	Jasnih Daya	Barisan Nasional (UMNO)	Gabungan Rakyat Sabah (GAGASAN)
N23	Petagas	Awang Ahmad Sah Awang Sahari	WARISAN	Gabungan Rakyat Sabah (GAGASAN)
N27	Limbahau	Juil Nuatim	WARISAN	Gabungan Rakyat Sabah (Direct)
N28	Kawang	Gulamhaidar @ Yusof Khan Bahadar	Perikatan Nasional (BERSATU)	Gabungan Rakyat Sabah (GAGASAN)
N31	Membakut	Mohd Arifin Mohd Arif	Perikatan Nasional (BERSATU)	Gabungan Rakyat Sabah (GAGASAN)
N32	Kilas	Isnin Aliasnih	Perikatan Nasional (BERSATU)	Gabungan Rakyat Sabah (GAGASAN)
N33	Kuala Penyu	Limus Jury	Perikatan Nasional (BERSATU)	Gabungan Rakyat Sabah (GAGASAN)
N35	Sindumin	Yusof Yacob	WARISAN	Gabungan Rakyat Sabah (GAGASAN)
N37	Karanaan	Masidi Manjun	Perikatan Nasional (BERSATU)	Gabungan Rakyat Sabah (GAGASAN)
N42	Melalap	Peter Anthony	WARISAN	KDM
N43	Kemabong	Rubin Balang	Perikatan Nasional (BERSATU)	Gabungan Rakyat Sabah (GAGASAN)
N46	Nabawan	Abdul Ghani Mohamed Yassin	Perikatan Nasional (BERSATU)	Gabungan Rakyat Sabah (GAGASAN)
N48	Sugut	James Ratib	Barisan Nasional (UMNO)	Gabungan Rakyat Sabah (GAGASAN)
N49	Labuk	Samad Jambri	Perikatan Nasional (BERSATU)	Gabungan Rakyat Sabah (GAGASAN)
N54	Karamunting	George Hiew Vun Zin	WARISAN	Gabungan Rakyat Sabah (GAGASAN)
N55	Elopura	Calvin Chong Ket Kiun	Pakatan Harapan (DAP)	WARISAN
N57	Kuamut	Masiung Banah	Independent	Gabungan Rakyat Sabah (GAGASAN)
N61	Segama	Mohamaddin Ketapi	WARISAN	Barisan Nasional (UMNO)
N63	Kunak	Norazlinah Arif	WARISAN	Gabungan Rakyat Sabah (GAGASAN)
N67	Balung	Hamid Awang	Barisan Nasional (UMNO)	Gabungan Rakyat Sabah (GAGASAN)
N68	Apas	Nizam Abu Bakar Titingan	Perikatan Nasional (BERSATU)	Gabungan Rakyat Sabah (GAGASAN)
N69	Sri Tanjong	Justin Wong	Pakatan Harapan (DAP)	WARISAN
N70	Kukusan	Rina Jainal	WARISAN	Gabungan Rakyat Sabah (PHRS)
N73	Sebatik	Hassan A. Gani Pg. Amir	WARISAN	Gabungan Rakyat Sabah (GAGASAN)
–	Nominated member	Amisah Yassin	Perikatan Nasional (BERSATU)	Gabungan Rakyat Sabah (GAGASAN)
–	Nominated member	Jaffari Waliam	Perikatan Nasional (BERSATU)	Gabungan Rakyat Sabah (GAGASAN)

=== Changed Allegiance Seats Post 2020 Sabah State Election ===
Date	PN	GRS	BN		PBS	KDM	PHRS	PBM	WARISAN	PH	STAR	SAPP	UPKO	IND		Vacant	Government
26 September 2020	17	0	14		7	0	0	0	23	8	0	0	1	3		0	41
8 October 2020	▲ (Note: Nominated assemblymen.) 21	0	▲ (Note: Nominated assemblymen.) 16		7	0	0	0	23	8	0	0	1	3		0	47
17 November 2020	21	0	16		7	0	0	0	▼22	8	0	0	1	3		▲ (Note: The Bugaya seat is vacated following the death of the incumbent Manis Muka Mohd Darah, triggering the 2022 Bugaya by-election postponed by COVID-19 emergency.) 1	47
25 February 2021	21	0	16		7	0	0	0	▼21	8	0	0	1	▲ (Note: Sebatik MLA left WARISAN.) 4		1	48
10 March 2021	▲ (Note: Pitas MLA joined BERSATU.) 22	0	16		7	0	0	0	21	8	0	0	1	▼3		1	48
6 April 2021	▲ (Note: Sebatik MLA joined BERSATU.) 23	0	16		7	0	0	0	21	8	0	0	1	▼2		1	48
27 August 2021	23	0	16		7	0	0	0	21	▲ (Note: UPKO joined PH.) 9	0	0	▼1	2		1	48
8 October 2021	23	0	16		7	0	0	0	▼20	9	0	0	0	▲ (Note: Sindumin MLA left WARISAN.) 3		1	49
30 October 2021	23	0	16		7	0	0	0	▼19	9	0	0	0	▲ (Note: Segama MLA left WARISAN.) 4		1	50
26 November 2021	▲ (Note: Segama MLA joined BERSATU.) 24	0	16		7	0	0	0	19	9	0	0	0	▼3		1	50
28 December 2021	24	0	16		7	0	0	0	▼17	9	0	0	0	▲ (Note: Limbahau and Melalap MLAs left WARISAN.) 5		1	52
20 January 2022	24	0	16		7	0	0	0	17	▼7	0	0	0	5	▲ (Note: Elopura and Sri Tanjong MLAs left DAP.) 2	1	52
28 January 2022	24	0	16		7	▲ (Note: Limbahau and Melalap MLAs founded KDM.) 2	0	0	17	7	0	0	0	▼3	2	1	52
11 March 2022	▼1	▲ (Note: BERSATU, STAR, PBS and SAPP founded GRS) 30	16		▼7	2	0	0	17	7	0	0	0	3	2	1	52
26 March 2022	1	30	16		0	2	0	0	▲ (Note: Elopura and Sri Tanjong MLAs joined WARISAN.) 19	7	0	0	0	3	▼0	1	52
22 May 2022	1	30	▲ (Note: Sindumin MLA joined UMNO.) 17		0	2	0	0	19	7	0	0	0	▼2		1	52
5 June 2022	1	30	17		0	2	▲ (Note: Kukusan MLA left WARISAN and joined PHRS.) 1	0	▼18	7	0	0	0	2		1	53
28 June 2022	1	▼29	17		0	2	1	0	18	7	0	0	0	▲ (Note: Segama MLA left BERSATU.) 3		1	53
28 August 2022	1	29	17		0	2	1	▲ (Note: Segama MLA joined PBM.) 1	18	7	0	0	0	▼2		1	53
21 October 2022	1	▼28	17		0	▲ (Note: Bandau MLA joined KDM.) 3	1	1	18	7	0	0	0	2		1	53
19 November 2022	1	28	17		0	3	1	1	▲ (Note: 2022 Bugaya by-election – WARISAN holds.) 19	7	0	0	0	2		▼0	53
25 November 2022	1	28	17		0	3	1	1	19	7 (Note: PH joined GRS government.)	0	0	0	2		0	60
6-7 January 2023	1	28	▲ (Note: Tanjung Batu, Bengkoka, Tanjung Keramat, Pantai Dalit, Sugut, Sindumin and Tempasuk MLAs) 7	▼ (Note: BN left GRS government.) (Note: Segama MLA joined UMNO.) 11	0	3 (Note: KDM left GRS government.)	1	▼0	19	7	0	0	0	2		0	46
6 February 2023	1	▲ (Note: Kemabong and Kuamut MLAs joined GAGASAN) (Note: all remaining BERSATU MLAs joined GAGASAN.) 30	7	11	0	3	1	0	▼16	7	0	0	0	▲ (Note: Banggi, Tanjung Kapor and Kunak MLAs left WARISAN.) 3		0	49
21 February 2023	1	▲ (Note: Balung, Pantai Dalit, Sugut, Sindumin and Tempasuk MLAs left UMNO and joined GAGASAN) (Note: Banggi, Tanjung Kapor and Kunak MLAs joined GAGASAN.) 38	▼3	▼10	0	3 (Note: KDM rejoined GRS government.)	1	0	16	7	0	0	0	▼0		0	53
27 February 2023	1	▲ (Note: Petagas MLA left WARISAN and joined GAGASAN) 39	3	10	0	3	1	0	▼15	7	0	0	0	0		0	54
4 March 2023	1	▲ (Note: Karamunting MLA left WARISAN and joined GAGASAN) 40	3	10	0	3	1	0	▼14	7	0	0	0	0		0	55
6 April 2023	1	▲ (Note: PHRS joined GRS) 41	3	10	0	3	▼0	0	14	7	0	0	0	0		0	55
21 May 2023	1	41	3	10	0	▼2	0	0	14	7	0	0	0	▲ (Note: Limbahau MLA left KDM) 1		0	55
23 May 2023	1	▲ (Note: Limbahau MLA joined GRS) 42	3	10	0	2	0	0	14	7	0	0	0	▼0		0	55
19 January 2025	1	42	3	▼9	0	2	0	0	14	7	0	0	0	0		▲ (Note: The Sungai Sibuga seat is vacated following the death of the incumbent Mohamad Hamsan Awang Supain.) 1	55
4 March 2025	1	42	3	9	0	▼1	0	0	14	7	0	0	0	0		▲ (Note: The Melalap seat is vacated following the imprisonment of the incumbent Peter Anthony.) 1	54
2 October 2025	1	▼35	3	9	0	1	0	0	14	7	▲ (Note: STAR left Gabungan Rakyat Sabah) 6	▲ (Note: SAPP left Gabungan Rakyat Sabah) 1	0	0		2	47
6 October 2025	1	▲ (Note: STAR MLAs except Tambunan left STAR and joined GRS) 40	3	9	0	1	0	0	14	7	▼1	1	0	0		2	52

==== Before 2022 Malaysian General Election ====
After 2020 Sabah Election. Opposition controlled 32 seats (40.5%).

On 25 February 2021, Sebatik MLA Hassan A. Gani Pg. Amir left WARISAN and joined BERSATU on 6 April 2021.

On 10 March 2021, independent Pitas MLA Ruddy Awah joined BERSATU.

On 8 October 2021, Sindumin MLA Yusof Yacob left WARISAN and officially rejoined BN and UMNO on 22 May 2022 after leaving four years ago in 2018.

On 30 October 2021, Segama MLA Mohamaddin Ketapi left WARISAN and joined BERSATU on 26 November 2021. However, he left BERSATU on 28 June 2022. He then joined PBM on 28 August 2022 and left before later joined UMNO since 2023.

Before the 2022 Malaysian General Election, several opposition politicians defected to the government. The opposition was left with 26 seats (32.9%), losing its veto power to block constitutional amendments.

On 28 December 2021, Limbahau MLA Juil Nuatim and Melalap MLA Peter Anthony left WARISAN and founded a new local political party based in Sabah namely Social Democratic Harmony Party (KDM) that is aligned with the ruling GRS coalition on 28 January 2022. Juil left KDM on 21 May 2023.

On 20 January 2022, Elopura MLA Calvin Chong and Sri Tanjong MLA Justin Wong left DAP but carried on aligning themselves with the PH opposition coalition and officially joined WARISAN on 26 March 2022.

On 5 June 2022, Kukusan MLA Rina Jainal left WARISAN and joined PHRS on the same day.

On 21 October 2022, State Assistant Minister to the Chief Minister and Bandau MLA Wetrom Bahanda left BERSATU and joined KDM on the same day.

	UMNO	BERSATU	PBS	STAR	KDM	SAPP	PAS	PBM	PHRS	WARISAN	DAP	PKR	UPKO	IND	Total
Post 2020 Sabah State Election	16	13	7	6	0	1	1	0	0	23	6	2	1	3	79
Pre 2022 Malaysian General Election	17	14	7	6	3	1	1	1	1	19	4	2	1	2	79
Net Changes	+1	+1	-	-	+3	-	-	+1	+1	-4	-2	-	-	-1	-

==== After 2022 Malaysian General Election ====
On 10 December 2022, The leadership of Bersatu Sabah announced its exit from the party and will form a new local party. Bersatu Sabah Chairman Hajiji Noor said the “unanimous decision” by Bersatu Sabah leaders to leave the party is based on the premise that the status quo is “no longer tenable”.

On 6 February 2023, Mohammad Mohamarin, Ben Chong Chen Bin and Norazlinah Arif left WARISAN on the same day and support the ruling GRS coalition.

On 21 February 2023, Yusof Yacob, along with other 8 MLAs support Hajiji. At the same time, Yusof Yacob, James Ratib, Jasnih Daya, Arshad Bistari, Hamid Awang, Mohammad Mohamarin, Ben Chong and Norazlinah joined GAGASAN.

On 27 February 2023, Awang Ahmad Sah Awang Sahari left WARISAN for GAGASAN.

On 4 March 2023, Karamunting MLA George Hiew Vun Zin left WARISAN for GAGASAN.

On 21 May 2023, Juil Nuatim resigned from KDM and joined GRS as a direct member two days later on 23 May 2023.

== Seating plan ==
Vacant	Vacant	Vacant		D	Sergeant-at-Arm	C		Vacant	Vacant	Vacant
Vacant	Vacant	N47 Telupid	Amisah Yassin	D		C	Vacant	Vacant	Vacant	Vacant
Jaffari Walliam	N25 Kapayan	N43 Kemabong	N28 Kawang	D		C	Vacant	Vacant	Vacant	Vacant
Aliakbar Gulasan	N57 Kuamut	N35 Sindumin	N46 Nabawan	D		C	Vacant	Vacant	Vacant	Vacant
			Yong Teck Lee	D		C	N21 Luyang (Minister)
N67 Balung	N63 Kunak	N41 Liawan	N11 Kadamaian	E		B	N20 Api-Api (Minister)	N05 Matunggong (Assistant Minister)	Vacant	Vacant
N73 Sebatik	N54 Karamunting	N70 Kukusan	N56 Tanjong Papat	E		B	N48 Sugut (Minister)	N40 Bingkor (Assistant Minister)	Vacant	Vacant
Vacant	N23 Petagas	N70 Kukusan	N56 Tanjong Papat	E		B	N48 Sugut (Minister)	N40 Bingkor (Assistant Minister)	Vacant	Vacant
N27 Limbahau	N09 Tempasuk	N13 Pantai Dalit	Vacant	E	the Mace	B	N45 Sook (Minister)	N33 Kuala Penyu (Assistant Minister)	N08 Pintasan (Assistant Minister)	Vacant
N06 Bandau	N09 Tempasuk	Vacant	N10 Usukan	E	the Mace	B	N31 Membakut (Minister)	N52 Sungai Sibuga (Vacant)	N08 Pintasan (Assistant Minister)	Vacant
N61 Segama	N04 Tanjong Kapor	N59 Sukau	N42 Melalap (Vacant)	E		B	N14 Tamparuli (Minister)	N32 Klias (Assistant Minister)	N44 Tulid (Assistant Minister)	Vacant
Raime Unggi	N01 Banggi	N59 Sukau	N42 Melalap (Vacant)	E		B	N14 Tamparuli (Minister)	N32 Klias (Assistant Minister)	N19 Likas (Assistant Minister)	Vacant
Suhaimi Nasir	N51 Sungai Manila	N29 Pantai Manis	N16 Karambunai	E		B	N37 Karanaan (Minister)	N18 Inanam (Assistant Minister)	N71 Tanjung Batu (Assistant Minister)	Vacant
			N58 Lamag	F		A	N24 Tanjung Keramat (Deputy Chief Minister III)
Vacant	N62 Silam	N50 Gum-Gum	N64 Sulabayan	F		A	N36 Kundasang (Deputy Chief Minister II)	N07 Tandek (Assistant Minister)	N02 Bengkoka (Assistant Minister)	Vacant
N72 Merotai	N60 Tungku	N30 Bongawan	N26 Moyog	F		A	N39 Tambunan (Deputy Chief Minister I)	N34 Lumadan (Assistant Minister)	N15 Kiulu (Assistant Minister)	Vacant
N69 Sri Tanjong	N55 Elopura	N22 Tanjung Aru	N65 Senallang (Opposition Leader)	F		A	N12 Sulaman (Chief Minister)	N38 Paginatan (Assistant Minister)	N03 Pitas (Assistant Minister)	Vacant
N66 Bugaya	N53 Sekong	N17 Darau		F	Secretary	A		N68 Apas (Assistant Minister)	N49 Labuk (Assistant Minister)	Vacant
					Speaker
					Yang Di-Pertua Negeri
