= Muis Picho =

Malaysian politician

Yang Berbahagia Datuk Abdul Muis Picho PGDK
- حاج عبدالمعز ڤيچو

Ministerial roles (Sabah)
- 2018–2020: Assistant Minister of Infrastructure Development

Faction represented in Sabah State Legislative Assembly
- 2008–2018: Barisan Nasional
- 2018–2020: Sabah Heritage Party

Personal details
- Born: 20 July 1957 (age 69) Kampung Bombalai, Tawau, North Borneo (now Sabah)
- Citizenship: Malaysian
- Party: UMNO (–2018); WARISAN (2018–2020); PPBM (2020–2022); GAGASAN (Official member since 2023)
- Other political affiliations: BN (–2018); PN (2020–); MN (2020–2022); GRS (Official direct member since 2023)
- Spouse: Hajjah Hanawiah binti Paressa
- Children: 12
- Education: Federal Institute of Technology
- Occupation: Politician

Abdul Muis Picho (born 20 July 1957) is a Malaysian politician who served as the Member of the Sabah State Legislative Assembly for Sebatik from 2008 to 2020. He is an official member of Sabah People's Idea Party (GAGASAN RAKYAT), a component party of GRS.

Born in Kampung Bombalai, Tawau in 1957, Muis was educated at SRK Bombalai, SMK Abaka and SMK Holy Trinity. He then studied automotive engineering at Federal Institute of Technology. Following the graduation, he served as the CEO of Manuk Mas Livestock Farm from 1984 to 1993.

Being a member of the United Malays National Organisation (UMNO) since 1990s, he served various positions within the party. He was firstly elected the MLA for Sebatik in 2008 election and was re-elected in 2013 and in 2018. Shortly after his third re-election in 2018, he quit the UMNO and joined the Sabah Heritage Party (WARISAN) in order to let Shafie Apdal to be the new Chief Minister.

On 29 July 2020, it was reported that Muis was one of several WARISAN-PH-UPKO MLAs who backed Musa Aman as the new Chief Minister. Though Musa announced that he had already gained enough supports (33 out of 65) to form a new government, Shafie asked the Yang di-Pertua Negeri to rather dissolve the State Legislative Assembly and call a fresh election. Muis then joined the Malaysian United Indigenous Party (PPBM) and sought for a re-election, but lost to the WARISAN candidate Hassan A. Gani Pg. Amir. Later, he joined GAGASAN RAKYAT in 2023 under Hajiji leadership and under Sebatik Division of GAGASAN RAKYAT.

He married Hajjah Hanawiah binti Paressa and has 12 children.

== Election results ==
Sabah Legislative Assembly
Year	Constituency	Candidate	Votes	Pct	Opponent(s)	Votes	Pct	Ballots cast	Majority	Turnout
2008	N60 Sebatik	Abdul Muis Picho (UMNO)	4,711	78.74%	Arsad Jamal (PKR)	880	14.71%	6,093	3,831	66.00%
2008	N60 Sebatik	Abdul Muis Picho (UMNO)	4,711	78.74%	Raden Kakung (IND)	392	6.55%	6,093	3,831	66.00%
2013	N60 Sebatik	Abdul Muis Picho (UMNO)	5,484	75.10%	Daud Jalaluddin (PAS)	1,344	18.41%	7,595	4,140	75.50%
2013	N60 Sebatik	Abdul Muis Picho (UMNO)	5,484	75.10%	Mohamad Yusup Lewah (IND)	249	3.41%	7,595	4,140	75.50%
2013	N60 Sebatik	Abdul Muis Picho (UMNO)	5,484	75.10%	Mohammad Jeffry Rosman (STAR)	225	3.08%	7,595	4,140	75.50%
2018	N60 Sebatik	Abdul Muis Picho (UMNO)	2,468	46.70%	Hassan A. Gani Pg. Amir (WARISAN)	2,275	43.04%	5,394	193	70.80%
2018	N60 Sebatik	Abdul Muis Picho (UMNO)	2,468	46.70%	Roslan Ramli (PAS)	504	9.54%	5,394	193	70.80%
2018	N60 Sebatik	Abdul Muis Picho (UMNO)	2,468	46.70%	Yusri Yunus (PPRS)	38	0.72%	5,394	193	70.80%
2020	N73 Sebatik	Abdul Muis Picho (BERSATU)	2,143	35.85%	Hassan A. Gani Pg. Amir (WARISAN)	2,665	44.58%	5,978	522	59.01%
2020	N73 Sebatik	Abdul Muis Picho (BERSATU)	2,143	35.85%	Abdul Samat Akui (PCS)	504	8.43%	5,978	522	59.01%
2020	N73 Sebatik	Abdul Muis Picho (BERSATU)	2,143	35.85%	Hassan Ibrahim (USNO)	253	4.23%	5,978	522	59.01%
2020	N73 Sebatik	Abdul Muis Picho (BERSATU)	2,143	35.85%	Mohd Balbir Arjan (IND)	183	3.06%	5,978	522	59.01%
2020	N73 Sebatik	Abdul Muis Picho (BERSATU)	2,143	35.85%	Baharuddin Basrie (PPRS)	140	2.34%	5,978	522	59.01%
2020	N73 Sebatik	Abdul Muis Picho (BERSATU)	2,143	35.85%	Juhuran Kalmin (IND)	90	1.51%	5,978	522	59.01%

== Honours ==
- Sabah
  - Commander of the Order of Kinabalu (PGDK) – Datuk (2013)
