= Amisah Yassin =

Malaysian politician

Yang Berbahagia Datuk Amisah Yassin PGDK AMN
- أميسه يسٓ

Nominated Member of the Sabah State Legislative Assembly
- In office 8 October 2020 – 6 October 2025 Serving with: Aliakbar Gulasan &; Jaffari Waliam &; Raime Unggi &; Suhaimi Nasir &; Yong Teck Lee
- Chief Minister: Hajiji Noor

Division Chairwoman of N38 Paginatan Branch of Parti Gagasan Rakyat Sabah
- Incumbent
- Assumed office 2023
- President: Hajiji Noor

Vice Chief of Srikandi Wing of the Malaysian United Indigenous Party of Sabah
- In office 23 August 2020 – 10 December 2022
- State Chairman: Hajiji Noor
- Srikandi Chief: Azizah Mohd Dun

Personal details
- Party: United Malays National Organisation of Sabah (Sabah UMNO) (until 2018); Malaysian United Indigenous Party of Sabah (Sabah BERSATU) (2019–2022); Parti Gagasan Rakyat Sabah (GAGASAN) (since 2023)
- Other political affiliations: Barisan Nasional (BN) (until 2018); Pakatan Harapan (PH) (2019–2020); Perikatan Nasional (PN) (2020–2022); Gabungan Rakyat Sabah (GRS) (since 2020)
- Education: University of Warwick (LLB)
- Occupation: Politician
- Profession: Lawyer

Amisah binti Yassin is a Malaysian politician and lawyer who served as a Nominated Member of the Sabah State Legislative Assembly (MLA) from October 2020 until October 2025 in the Gabungan Rakyat Sabah (GRS) state administration under Chief Minister Hajiji Noor. She is a member of Parti Gagasan Rakyat Sabah (GAGASAN), a component party of the GRS coalition. She previously served as the Vice Chief of Srikandi Wing of the Malaysian United Indigenous Party of Sabah from August 2020 to her resignation from the party in December 2022.

== Education ==
She studied at the University of Warwick and graduated with a Bachelor of Laws (LLB) in 1989.

== Career ==
She was the Political Secretary to the Minister of Tourism, Culture and Environment of Sabah, Masidi Manjun.

She was a nominated member in the 16th Sabah State Legislative Assembly, appointed by Sabah Chief Minister Hajiji Noor after their coalition won the 2020 Sabah state election.

After former Sabah BERSATU members joined GAGASAN, she became the Division Chairwoman of the Paginatan Branch.

== Awards and honours ==
- Malaysia
  - Member of the Order of the Defender of the Realm (AMN) (2006)
- Sabah
  - Commander of the Order of Kinabalu (PGDK) – Datuk (1999)
