= Aliakbar Gulasan =

Malaysian politician (born 1971)

Yang Berhormat Datuk Dr. Aliakbar Gulasan PGDK MLA
- علي أكبر ڬولاسن

Member of the Sabah State Legislative Assembly for Karambunai
- Incumbent
- Assumed office 29 November 2025
- Preceded by: Yakub Khan (BN–UMNO)
- Majority: 365 (2025)

Nominated Member of the Sabah State Legislative Assembly
- In office 8 October 2020 – 6 October 2025 Serving with: Amisah Yassin &; Jaffari Waliam &; Raime Unggi &; Suhaimi Nasir &; Yong Teck Lee
- Chief Minister: Hajiji Noor

Chairman of the Malaysian Cocoa Board
- In office 1 July 2020 – 30 September 2021
- Minister: Khairuddin Razali (2020–2021); Zuraida Kamaruddin (2021)
- Preceded by: Anyi Ngau
- Succeeded by: Rahimah Majid

State Commissioner of the Malaysian Islamic Party of Sabah
- Incumbent
- Assumed office 1 November 2023
- President: Abdul Hadi Awang
- Preceded by: Mohd Aminuddin Aling

Personal details
- Born: 8 February 1971 (age 55) Kampung Kota Ayangan, Keningau, Sabah
- Party: Malaysian Islamic Party (PAS)
- Other political affiliations: Gabungan Rakyat Sabah (GRS) (2022–2024); Perikatan Nasional (PN) (since 2020)
- Education: National University of Malaysia (PhD)
- Occupation: Politician
- Profession: Lecturer; Cocoa Farmer
- Website: https://draliakbar.com

Aliakbar bin Gulasan (Jawi: علي أكبر بن ڬولاسن; born 8 February 1971) is a Malaysian politician of mixed Pakistani-Dusun-Murut-Bajau descent from Sabah, East Malaysia. who served as the Member of the Sabah State Legislative Assembly (MLA) for Karambunai since November 2025 and a Nominated Member of the Sabah State Legislative Assembly (MLA) from October 2020 until October 2025 in the Gabungan Rakyat Sabah (GRS) state administration under Chief Minister Hajiji Noor. He is an official member cum Sabah state liaison chairman of the Malaysian Islamic Party (PAS). At the party level, he is the State Commissioner of Sabah since November 2023. He was previously a senior lecturer of the Faculty of Humanities, Arts and Heritage, Universiti Malaysia Sabah (UMS). In 2020, he was recognised by Sabahans as the first ever Malaysian Islamic Party (PAS) member who become a nominated assemblyman for the Sabah State Legislative Assembly (ADUN), an appointment which contrary to certain claims, was quite well-received by Sabahans, but not all welcomed the appointment, owing that it marked the ire of some Sabahans especially those who did not support the said party.

== Background ==
=== Early life ===
He is of mixed Dusun-Pakistani-Bajau bloodline and is currently residing with his family in Keningau, Sabah which is his birthplace cum paternal hometown, whilst also maintaining residences in his maternal hometown of Tenom and the state capital city of Kota Kinabalu, owing to his political and academic career. Aliakbar was born in Kampung Kota Ayangan, Keningau and he is the fourth child out of eight children. His father, the late Gulasan bin Mushall Khan who is of mixed Pakistani-Dusun descent is a native of the said village in the said district since the predominant ethnicity or tribe are mostly native Dusuns, initially worked as a personal driver who was hired by several Sabah state government departments and agencies using a Land Rover car along the Tenom-Keningau highway that was last posted to the Public Works Department (JKR) in Tenom prior to retirement. His mother, the late Ruhujah binti Musturullah Khan who is of mixed Pakistani-Murut ancestry from Tenom was a full-time housewife.

=== Education ===
He received his early education at St Anthony's Primary School, Tenom from 1977 to 1982 before continuing his secondary education in St Anthony's Secondary School, Tenom (1983–1989). Then he continued schooling in sixth form at SMK Gunsanad, Keningau (1989–1991).

He then continued his studies at the University of Malaya in the field of Geography in 1993. After that, he continued his studies at Universiti Kebangsaan Malaysia (UKM) until he graduated with a master's degree in environmental management in 1995 and then continued his studies at the PhD level in the field of Urban Geography in 2009.

=== Academic and early political career ===
After successfully completing his studies at UKM in 1995, he became a lecturer at Universiti Malaysia Sabah (UMS) since November 1996. He was appointed as Chairman of the Malaysian Cocoa Board on 1 July 2020 and served in this position until September 2021.

== Involvement in politics ==
After the Malaysian Islamic Party leadership election, he was elected as a member of the PAS Central Working Committee representing Sabah as well as East Malaysia.

In the 2025 Sabah state election, he contested the N16 Karambunai seat under Perikatan Nasional and won with a majority of 365 votes in an eleven-cornered contest, marking the first time a PAS candidate was elected to the Sabah State Legislative Assembly.

== Election results ==
Sabah State Legislative Assembly
Year	Constituency	Candidate	Votes	Pct	Opponent(s)	Votes	Pct	Ballots cast	Majority	Turnout
2025	N16 Karambunai	Aliakbar Gulasan (PAS)	7,054	27.48%	Ahmad Jais Otong (WARISAN)	6,689	26.05%	25,676	365	66.97%
2025	N16 Karambunai	Aliakbar Gulasan (PAS)	7,054	27.48%	Arshad Idris (GAGASAN)	4,818	18.77%	25,676	365	66.97%
2025	N16 Karambunai	Aliakbar Gulasan (PAS)	7,054	27.48%	Yakub Khan (Sabah UMNO)	4,475	17.43%	25,676	365	66.97%
2025	N16 Karambunai	Aliakbar Gulasan (PAS)	7,054	27.48%	Stephen Teo (STAR)	2,010	7.83%	25,676	365	66.97%
2025	N16 Karambunai	Aliakbar Gulasan (PAS)	7,054	27.48%	Adis Jalie (IMPIAN)	162	0.63%	25,676	365	66.97%
2025	N16 Karambunai	Aliakbar Gulasan (PAS)	7,054	27.48%	Hates @ Ajis Abdul (SPP)	150	0.58%	25,676	365	66.97%
2025	N16 Karambunai	Aliakbar Gulasan (PAS)	7,054	27.48%	Mohd Yunus Ibrahim (PBK)	127	0.49%	25,676	365	66.97%
2025	N16 Karambunai	Aliakbar Gulasan (PAS)	7,054	27.48%	Azman Fathil (GAS)	73	0.28%	25,676	365	66.97%
2025	N16 Karambunai	Aliakbar Gulasan (PAS)	7,054	27.48%	Raynold Saikam Salinggou (PERPADUAN)	73	0.28%	25,676	365	66.97%
2025	N16 Karambunai	Aliakbar Gulasan (PAS)	7,054	27.48%	Matkri Kassim (PKS)	45	0.18%	25,676	365	66.97%

== Awards and honours ==
- Sabah
  - Commander of the Order of Kinabalu (PGDK) – Datuk (2024)
  - Companion of the Order of Kinabalu (ASDK) (2022)
