= Harun Durabi =

Malaysian politician and teacher (born 1963)

Yang Berhormat Datuk Harun Durabi PGDK AMN MLA
- هارون دورابي

State Assistant Minister of Science, Technology and Innovation of Sabah
- In office 26 January 2023 – 1 December 2025
- Governor: Juhar Mahiruddin (2023–2024); Musa Aman (2025)
- Chief Minister: Hajiji Noor
- State Minister: Mohd Arifin Mohd Arif
- Preceded by: Ruddy Awah
- Succeeded by: Jordan Jude Ellron (as Assistant Minister of Education, Science, Technology and Innovation)
- Constituency: Bengkoka

State Assistant Minister of Rural Development of Sabah
- In office 8 October 2020 – 26 January 2023 Serving with Samad Jambri
- Governor: Juhar Mahiruddin
- Chief Minister: Hajiji Noor
- State Minister: Jahid Jahim
- Preceded by: Dumi Pg Masdal
- Succeeded by: Ruddy Awah
- Constituency: Bengkoka

Member of the Sabah State Legislative Assembly for Bengkoka
- Incumbent
- Assumed office 26 September 2020
- Preceded by: Position established
- Majority: 1,337 (2020); 77 (2025)

Faction represented in the Sabah State Legislative Assembly
- 2020–: Barisan Nasional

Personal details
- Born: Harun bin Durabi; 11 January 1963 (age 63) Pitas, Kudat, Crown Colony of North Borneo
- Citizenship: Malaysia
- Party: United Malays National Organisation of Sabah (Sabah UMNO)
- Other political affiliations: Barisan Nasional (BN)
- Spouse: Nurhaidah Kili
- Education: Sabah College
- Occupation: Politician
- Profession: Teacher

Harun bin Durabi (born 11 January 1963) is a Malaysian politician and teacher who served as the State Assistant Minister of Science, Technology and Innovation of Sabah in the Gabungan Rakyat Sabah (GRS) state administration under Chief Minister Hajiji Noor and Minister Mohd Arifin Mohd Arif from January 2023 to December 2025, State Assistant Minister of Rural Development of Sabah under Minister Jahid Jahim from October 2020 to January 2023, as well as Member of the Sabah State Legislative Assembly (MLA) for Bengkoka since September 2020. He is a member and the Division Chief of Kudat of the United Malays National Organisation of Sabah (Sabah UMNO), a branch of a component party of the Barisan Nasional (BN) coalition.

== Election results ==
Sabah State Legislative Assembly
Year	Constituency	Candidate	Votes	Pct	Opponent(s)	Votes	Pct	Ballots cast	Majority	Turnout
2020	N02 Bengkoka	Harun Durabi (Sabah UMNO)	2,538	31.98%	Junsim Rumunzing (UPKO)	1,201	15.14%	7,935	1,337	68.74%
2020	N02 Bengkoka	Harun Durabi (Sabah UMNO)	2,538	31.98%	Maklin Masiau (IND)	1,149	14.48%	7,935	1,337	68.74%
2020	N02 Bengkoka	Harun Durabi (Sabah UMNO)	2,538	31.98%	Samuil Mopun (PBS)	898	11.32%	7,935	1,337	68.74%
2020	N02 Bengkoka	Harun Durabi (Sabah UMNO)	2,538	31.98%	Pransol Tiying (IND)	731	9.21%	7,935	1,337	68.74%
2020	N02 Bengkoka	Harun Durabi (Sabah UMNO)	2,538	31.98%	Akian Ah Kiew (IND)	576	7.26%	7,935	1,337	68.74%
2020	N02 Bengkoka	Harun Durabi (Sabah UMNO)	2,538	31.98%	Aminah Ambrose (IND)	399	5.03%	7,935	1,337	68.74%
2020	N02 Bengkoka	Harun Durabi (Sabah UMNO)	2,538	31.98%	Omar Jalun (USNO Baru)	174	2.19%	7,935	1,337	68.74%
2020	N02 Bengkoka	Harun Durabi (Sabah UMNO)	2,538	31.98%	Jose Modsinupu (PCS)	159	2.00%	7,935	1,337	68.74%
2020	N02 Bengkoka	Harun Durabi (Sabah UMNO)	2,538	31.98%	Sotijin Juhui (GAGASAN)	91	1.15%	7,935	1,337	68.74%
2020	N02 Bengkoka	Harun Durabi (Sabah UMNO)	2,538	31.98%	Rita Cham (PPRS)	19	0.24%	7,935	1,337	68.74%
2025	N02 Bengkoka	Harun Durabi (Sabah UMNO)	2,485	20.96%	Samuil Mopun (PBS)	2,408	20.31%	11,973	77	66.74%
2025	N02 Bengkoka	Harun Durabi (Sabah UMNO)	2,485	20.96%	Maklin Masiau (STAR)	1,899	16.02%	11,973	77	66.74%
2025	N02 Bengkoka	Harun Durabi (Sabah UMNO)	2,485	20.96%	Rahim @ Richard Mazagi (KDM)	1,528	12.89%	11,973	77	66.74%
2025	N02 Bengkoka	Harun Durabi (Sabah UMNO)	2,485	20.96%	Fauziah Stephens (WARISAN)	1,290	10.88%	11,973	77	66.74%
2025	N02 Bengkoka	Harun Durabi (Sabah UMNO)	2,485	20.96%	Jomin Mogompit (IND)	1,084	9.14%	11,973	77	66.74%
2025	N02 Bengkoka	Harun Durabi (Sabah UMNO)	2,485	20.96%	Junsim Rumunzing (UPKO)	622	5.25%	11,973	77	66.74%
2025	N02 Bengkoka	Harun Durabi (Sabah UMNO)	2,485	20.96%	Berusli Kimin (Sabah BERSATU)	310	2.61%	11,973	77	66.74%
2025	N02 Bengkoka	Harun Durabi (Sabah UMNO)	2,485	20.96%	Matin Ugung (IMPIAN)	183	1.54%	11,973	77	66.74%
2025	N02 Bengkoka	Harun Durabi (Sabah UMNO)	2,485	20.96%	Gunsanad Malingka (PBK)	26	0.22%	11,973	77	66.74%
2025	N02 Bengkoka	Harun Durabi (Sabah UMNO)	2,485	20.96%	Mohd Izahan Abdullah (IND)	21	0.18%	11,973	77	66.74%

== Honours ==
- Malaysia
  - Member of the Order of the Defender of the Realm (AMN) (2012)
- Sabah
  - Commander of the Order of Kinabalu (PGDK) – Datuk (2022)
  - Companion of the Order of Kinabalu (ASDK) (2020)
  - Grand Star of the Order of Kinabalu (BSK) (2006)
