= Jaffari Waliam =

Malaysian politician (born 1976)

Yang Berbahagia Datuk Jaffari Waliam PGDK
- جعفري وليام

Chairman of Innoprise Capital Sdn Bhd
- Incumbent
- Assumed office 2023
- Chief Minister: Hajiji Noor

Nominated Member of the Sabah State Legislative Assembly
- In office 8 October 2020 – 6 October 2025 Serving with: Aliakbar Gulasan &; Amisah Yassin &; Raime Unggi &; Suhaimi Nasir &; Yong Teck Lee
- Chief Minister: Hajiji Noor
- In office 20 September 2018 – 30 July 2020 Serving with: Wilfred Madius Tangau &; Loretto Padua Jr &; Terrence Siambun &; Stephen Wong Tien Fatt (until 2019) &; Ronnie Loh Ee Eng (2019–2020)
- Chief Minister: Shafie Apdal

Deputy Division Chairman of N50 Gum-Gum Branch of Parti Gagasan Rakyat Sabah
- Incumbent
- Assumed office 2023
- President: Hajiji Noor
- Division Chairman: Juslie Ajirol

Faction represented in the Sabah State Legislative Assembly
- 2018–2020: Pakatan Harapan
- 2020: Independent
- 2020–2022: Perikatan Nasional
- 2022–2025: Gabungan Rakyat Sabah

Personal details
- Born: Jaffari bin Waliam; 15 December 1976 (age 49) Sabah, Malaysia
- Party: People's Justice Party (PKR) (until 2020); Malaysian United Indigenous Party of Sabah (Sabah BERSATU) (2020–2022); Parti Gagasan Rakyat Sabah (GAGASAN) (since 2023)
- Other political affiliations: Pakatan Harapan (PH) (until 2020); Perikatan Nasional (PN) (2020–2022); Gabungan Rakyat Sabah (GRS) (since 2020)
- Spouse: Noorolaini Abang Rahman
- Occupation: Politician

Jaffari bin Waliam (born 15 December 1976) is a Malaysian politician who served as a Nominated Member of the Sabah State Legislative Assembly (MLA) from October 2020 until October 2025 in the Gabungan Rakyat Sabah (GRS) state administration under Chief Minister Hajiji Noor and was also a nominated member of the state assembly in the WARISAN state administration under Chief Minister Shafie Apdal. He is the Deputy Division Chairman of the Gum-Gum Branch and Supreme Council Member (AMT) of Parti Gagasan Rakyat Sabah (GAGASAN), a main component party of the GRS coalition.

== Political career ==
On 28 February 2020, Jaffari Waliam announced exit from PKR and officially become an independent while searching for a party that has a potential leader. In 2021, he officially join BERSATU. In 2023, he made a decision to join GAGASAN to strengthen the local party that made in Sabah and based in Sabah after his team was inspired by the Sarawak-based party, Gabungan Parti Sarawak (GPS). He officially become one of the party's AMT afterwards.

== Awards and honours ==
- Sabah
  - Commander of the Order of Kinabalu (PGDK) – Datuk (2022)
