= Raime Unggi =

Malaysian politician (born 1970)

Yang Berbahagia Datuk Raime Unggi PGDK
- رايمي أوڠڬي

Political Secretary to the Minister of Tourism, Culture and Environment of Sabah
- Incumbent
- Assumed office 18 December 2025
- Chief Minister: Hajiji Noor
- State Minister: Jafry Arifin
- Preceded by: Vivian Lee Mee Peng

Nominated Member of the Sabah State Legislative Assembly
- In office 8 October 2020 – 6 October 2025 Serving with: Aliakbar Gulasan &; Amisah Yassin &; Jaffari Waliam &; Suhaimi Nasir &; Yong Teck Lee
- Chief Minister: Hajiji Noor

Member of the Malaysian Parliament for Tenom
- In office 21 March 2004 – 9 May 2018
- Preceded by: Rizalman Abdullah (BN–UMNO)
- Succeeded by: Noorita Sual (PH–DAP)
- Majority: 2,404 (2004); 6,883 (2008); 3,886 (2013)

Faction represented in the Sabah State Legislative Assembly
- 2020–2025: Barisan Nasional

Faction represented in Dewan Rakyat
- 2004–2018: Barisan Nasional

Personal details
- Born: 8 March 1970 (age 56) Tenom, Sabah, Malaysia
- Party: United Malays National Organisation of Sabah (Sabah UMNO)
- Other political affiliations: Barisan Nasional (BN)
- Spouse: Noriah Ibrahim
- Occupation: Politician

Raime bin Unggi (born 8 March 1970) is a Malaysian politician who has served as Political Secretary to the Minister of Tourism, Culture and Environment of Sabah since December 2025. He was a Nominated Member of the Sabah State Legislative Assembly (MLA) from October 2020 until October 2025 in the Gabungan Rakyat Sabah (GRS) state administration under Chief Minister Hajiji Noor and previously served as the Member of Parliament (MP) for Tenom from March 2004 to May 2018. He is a member and the Division Chief of Tenom of the United Malays National Organisation of Sabah (Sabah UMNO), a branch of a component party of the ruling Barisan Nasional (BN).

He was elected to the Dewan Rakyat, Parliament in the 2004 general election. Little known at the time, he replaced Parliamentary Secretary Rizalman Abdullah for the BN nomination for the Tenom constituency and went on to win in the general election.

== Election results ==
Parliament of Malaysia
Year	Constituency	Candidate	Votes	Pct	Opponent(s)	Votes	Pct	Ballots cast	Majority	Turnout
2004	P181 Tenom	Raime Unggi (Sabah UMNO)	8,032	58.80%	Limun Laikim (IND)	5,628	41.20%	14,056	2,404	68.88%
2008	P181 Tenom	Raime Unggi (Sabah UMNO)	9,535	62.85%	Adris Taripin (PKR)	2,652	17.48%	15,694	6,883	75.24%
2008	P181 Tenom	Raime Unggi (Sabah UMNO)	9,535	62.85%	Joh Jimmy (IND)	2,499	16.47%	15,694	6,883	75.24%
2008	P181 Tenom	Raime Unggi (Sabah UMNO)	9,535	62.85%	Mutang Dawat (BERSEKUTU)	485	3.20%	15,694	6,883	75.24%
2013	P181 Tenom	Raime Unggi (Sabah UMNO)	9,771	48.15%	Masdin Tumas (PKR)	5,885	29.00%	20,926	3,886	82.77%
2013	P181 Tenom	Raime Unggi (Sabah UMNO)	9,771	48.15%	Hasmin Azroy Abdullah (STAR)	2,449	12.07%	20,926	3,886	82.77%
2013	P181 Tenom	Raime Unggi (Sabah UMNO)	9,771	48.15%	Jimmy Jawatah (SAPP)	1,766	8.70%	20,926	3,886	82.77%
2013	P181 Tenom	Raime Unggi (Sabah UMNO)	9,771	48.15%	Mutang @ Sylvester Dawat (KITA)	423	2.08%	20,926	3,886	82.77%

Sabah State Legislative Assembly
Year	Constituency	Candidate	Votes	Pct	Opponent(s)	Votes	Pct	Ballots cast	Majority	Turnout
2020	N43 Kemabong	Raime Unggi (Sabah UMNO)	2,966	27.08%	Rubin Balang (IND)	4,214	38.48%	10,952	1,012	72.60%
2020	N43 Kemabong	Raime Unggi (Sabah UMNO)	2,966	27.08%	Lucas Umbul (UPKO)	3,202	29.23%	10,952	1,012	72.60%
2020	N43 Kemabong	Raime Unggi (Sabah UMNO)	2,966	27.08%	Juster Peter (LDP)	268	2.45%	10,952	1,012	72.60%
2020	N43 Kemabong	Raime Unggi (Sabah UMNO)	2,966	27.08%	Alfred Tay Jin Kiong (PCS)	229	2.09%	10,952	1,012	72.60%
2020	N43 Kemabong	Raime Unggi (Sabah UMNO)	2,966	27.08%	Rainus Sagulau (USNO Baru)	73	0.67%	10,952	1,012	72.60%

== Honours ==
- Sabah
  - Commander of the Order of Kinabalu (PGDK) – Datuk (2009)
