= Suhaimi Nasir =

Malaysian politician (born 1968)

Yang Berhormat Datuk Suhaimi Nasir PGDK ADK BSK MP
- سحيمي ناصر

Member of the Malaysian Parliament for Libaran
- Incumbent
- Assumed office 19 November 2022
- Preceded by: Zakaria Edris (BN–UMNO)
- Majority: 12,618 (2022)

Nominated Member of the Sabah State Legislative Assembly
- In office 8 October 2020 – 6 October 2025 Serving with: Aliakbar Gulasan &; Amisah Yassin &; Jaffari Waliam &; Raime Unggi &; Yong Teck Lee
- Chief Minister: Hajiji Noor

Faction represented in Dewan Rakyat
- 2022–: Barisan Nasional

Faction represented in the Sabah State Legislative Assembly
- 2020–2025: Barisan Nasional

Personal details
- Born: Suhaimi bin Nasir; 10 October 1968 (age 57) Sandakan, Sabah, Malaysia
- Party: United Malays National Organisation of Sabah (Sabah UMNO)
- Other political affiliations: Barisan Nasional (BN)
- Spouse: Nor Nazimah Hashim
- Education: Bogor University
- Occupation: Politician

Suhaimi bin Nasir (born 10 October 1968) is a Malaysian politician who has served as the Member of Parliament (MP) for Libaran since November 2022 and was a Nominated Member of the Sabah State Legislative Assembly (MLA) from October 2020 until October 2025 in the Gabungan Rakyat Sabah (GRS) state administration under Chief Minister Hajiji Noor. He is a member and the Division Chief of Libaran of the United Malays National Organisation of Sabah (Sabah UMNO), a branch of a component party of the Barisan Nasional (BN) coalition.

== Election results ==
Parliament of Malaysia
Year	Constituency	Candidate	Votes	Pct	Opponent(s)	Votes	Pct	Ballots cast	Majority	Turnout
2022	P184 Libaran	Suhaimi Nasir (Sabah UMNO)	22,969	51.58%	Peter Jr Naintin (UPKO)	10,351	23.24%	45,632	12,618	61.56%
2022	P184 Libaran	Suhaimi Nasir (Sabah UMNO)	22,969	51.58%	SH Bokrata SH Hassan (WARISAN)	9,185	20.63%	45,632	12,618	61.56%
2022	P184 Libaran	Suhaimi Nasir (Sabah UMNO)	22,969	51.58%	Jeffri @ Amat Pudang (PEJUANG)	826	1.85%	45,632	12,618	61.56%
2022	P184 Libaran	Suhaimi Nasir (Sabah UMNO)	22,969	51.58%	Amdan Tumpong (IND)	659	1.48%	45,632	12,618	61.56%
2022	P184 Libaran	Suhaimi Nasir (Sabah UMNO)	22,969	51.58%	Nordi Khani (PPRS)	541	1.21%	45,632	12,618	61.56%

Sabah State Legislative Assembly
Year	Constituency	Candidate	Votes	Pct	Opponent(s)	Votes	Pct	Ballots cast	Majority	Turnout
2020	N50 Gum-Gum	Suhaimi Nasir (Sabah UMNO)	2,871	35.84%	Arunarnsin Taib (WARISAN)	3,140	39.21%	8,009	269	64.21%
2020	N50 Gum-Gum	Suhaimi Nasir (Sabah UMNO)	2,871	35.84%	Yunus Nurdin (IND)	1,690	21.10%	8,009	269	64.21%
2020	N50 Gum-Gum	Suhaimi Nasir (Sabah UMNO)	2,871	35.84%	Undang Tumpong (PCS)	172	2.15%	8,009	269	64.21%
2020	N50 Gum-Gum	Suhaimi Nasir (Sabah UMNO)	2,871	35.84%	Jainudin Berahim (LDP)	113	1.41%	8,009	269	64.21%
2020	N50 Gum-Gum	Suhaimi Nasir (Sabah UMNO)	2,871	35.84%	Riduan Sampai (PPRS)	23	0.29%	8,009	269	64.21%
2025	N52 Sungai Sibuga	Suhaimi Nasir (Sabah UMNO)	6,531	29.84%	Nurulalsah Hassan Alban (WARISAN)	6,619	30.24%	22,321	88	57.83%
2025	N52 Sungai Sibuga	Suhaimi Nasir (Sabah UMNO)	6,531	29.84%	Amir Shah Yaakub (GAGASAN)	6,493	29.66%	22,321	88	57.83%
2025	N52 Sungai Sibuga	Suhaimi Nasir (Sabah UMNO)	6,531	29.84%	Norani Asmatil (PAS)	1,662	7.59%	22,321	88	57.83%
2025	N52 Sungai Sibuga	Suhaimi Nasir (Sabah UMNO)	6,531	29.84%	Ismail Md Said (IMPIAN)	584	2.67%	22,321	88	57.83%

== Honours ==
=== Honours of Malaysia ===
- Malaysia
  - Recipient of the 17th Yang di-Pertuan Agong Installation Medal (2025)
- Sabah
  - Commander of the Order of Kinabalu (PGDK) – Datuk (2021)
  - Member of the Order of Kinabalu (ADK) (2012)
  - Grand Star of the Order of Kinabalu (BSK) (2010)
