= Samad Jambri =

Malaysian politician

Yang Berhormat Datuk Samad Jambri PGDK ASDK ADK MLA
- صمد زمبري

State Assistant Minister of Rural Development of Sabah
- Incumbent
- Assumed office 8 October 2020 (lapse on 30 November 2025 – 1 December 2025) Serving with: Harun Durabi (2020–2023) &; Ruddy Awah (2023–2025) &; Juil Nuatim (since 2025)
- Governor: Juhar Mahiruddin (2023–2024); Musa Aman (since 2025)
- Chief Minister: Hajiji Noor
- State Minister: Jahid Jahim (2020–2025); Rubin Balang (since 2025)
- Preceded by: Rasinin Kautis
- Constituency: Labuk

Member of the Sabah State Legislative Assembly for Labuk
- Incumbent
- Assumed office 26 September 2020
- Preceded by: Abdul Rahman Kongkawang (BN–PBS)
- Majority: 1,208 (2020); 979 (2025)

Faction represented in the Sabah State Legislative Assembly
- 2020–: Gabungan Rakyat Sabah

Personal details
- Born: Samad bin Jambri @ Jamri Beluran, Sabah, Malaysia
- Party: Malaysian United Indigenous Party of Sabah (Sabah BERSATU) (2020–2022); Parti Gagasan Rakyat Sabah (GAGASAN) (since 2023)
- Other political affiliations: Perikatan Nasional (PN) (2020–2022); Gabungan Rakyat Sabah (GRS) (since 2023)
- Spouse: Rosminah Arman
- Occupation: Politician

Samad bin Jambri is a Malaysian politician who has served as the State Assistant Minister of Rural Development of Sabah in the Gabungan Rakyat Sabah (GRS) state administration under Chief Minister Hajiji Noor and Minister Jahid Jahim from October 2020 until November 2025 and Minister Rubin Balang since December 2025, as well as Member of the Sabah State Legislative Assembly (MLA) for Labuk since September 2020. He is a member of Parti Gagasan Rakyat Sabah (GAGASAN), a component party of the GRS coalition. He was a formerly member of the Malaysian United Indigenous Party of Sabah (Sabah BERSATU), a branch of a component party of the Perikatan Nasional (PN). He left Sabah BERSATU on 10 December 2022 and joined GAGASAN on 5 February 2023.

== Election results ==
Sabah State Legislative Assembly
Year	Constituency	Candidate	Votes	Pct	Opponent(s)	Votes	Pct	Ballots cast	Majority	Turnout
2020	N49 Labuk	Samad Jambri (Sabah BERSATU)	2,701	46.11%	Dennis T. Rantau (UPKO)	1,493	25.49%	5,858	1,208	65.44%
2020	N49 Labuk	Samad Jambri (Sabah BERSATU)	2,701	46.11%	Abdul Rahman Kongkawang (IND)	1,441	24.60%	5,858	1,208	65.44%
2020	N49 Labuk	Samad Jambri (Sabah BERSATU)	2,701	46.11%	Fidelis K. Michael (PCS)	115	1.96%	5,858	1,208	65.44%
2020	N49 Labuk	Samad Jambri (Sabah BERSATU)	2,701	46.11%	Sh. Suhaimi Sh. Miasin (USNO Baru)	108	1.84%	5,858	1,208	65.44%
2025	N49 Labuk	Samad Jambri (GAGASAN)	2,885	31.70%	Yusuflatif Mustapah (Sabah UMNO)	1,906	20.94%	9,342	979	64.21%
2025	N49 Labuk	Samad Jambri (GAGASAN)	2,885	31.70%	Japar Awang (WARISAN)	1,411	15.50%	9,342	979	64.21%
2025	N49 Labuk	Samad Jambri (GAGASAN)	2,885	31.70%	Asmad Nasir (Sabah BERSATU)	1,364	14.99%	9,342	979	64.21%
2025	N49 Labuk	Samad Jambri (GAGASAN)	2,885	31.70%	Norfadzlina Ramsah (UPKO)	1,081	11.88%	9,342	979	64.21%
2025	N49 Labuk	Samad Jambri (GAGASAN)	2,885	31.70%	Marx Henry Lim (KDM)	232	2.55%	9,342	979	64.21%
2025	N49 Labuk	Samad Jambri (GAGASAN)	2,885	31.70%	Junsik @ Joseph Imus (IMPIAN)	185	2.03%	9,342	979	64.21%
2025	N49 Labuk	Samad Jambri (GAGASAN)	2,885	31.70%	Nuralizah Lee Abdullah (ANAK NEGERI)	38	0.42%	9,342	979	64.21%

== Honours ==
- Sabah
  - Commander of the Order of Kinabalu (PGDK) – Datuk (2023)
  - Companion of the Order of Kinabalu (ASDK) (2021)
  - Member of the Order of Kinabalu (ADK) (2016)
