= Limbahau =

State constituency in Sabah, Malaysia

Limbahau (N27)
Sabah constituency

State constituency
- Legislature: Sabah State Legislative Assembly
MLA
Juil Nuatim
GRS
- Constituency created: 2019
- First contested: 2020
- Last contested: 2025

Demographics
- Electors (2025): 20,225

Limbahau is a state constituency in Sabah, Malaysia, that is represented in the Sabah State Legislative Assembly. This is one of the thirteen new state constituencies as result of approval from state legislative and Dewan Rakyat on 17 July 2019 and presenting for the first time for snap election

== Demographics ==
As of 2020, Limbahau has a population of 30,815 people.

Ethnic breakdown of Limbahau's electorate as of 2025
1. Muslim Bumiputera (70.0%)
2. Non-Muslim Bumiputera (22.0%)
3. Chinese (8.00%)
4. Other ethnicities (0.00%)

== History ==
=== Polling districts ===
According to the gazette issued on 31 October 2022, the Limbahau constituency has a total of 9 polling districts.

| State constituency | Polling Districts | Code | Location |
|---|---|---|---|
| Limbahau（N27） | Dambai | 175/27/01 | SK Limputong; Dewan Serbaguna Kampung Biau |
| Limbahau（N27） | Labak | 175/27/02 | SK Tampasak |
| Limbahau（N27） | Kaiduan | 175/27/03 | SK Kaiduan |
| Limbahau（N27） | Gana | 175/27/04 | SK Gana |
| Limbahau（N27） | Ovai | 175/27/05 | SK Kogopon |
| Limbahau（N27） | Surati | 175/27/06 | SK Surati |
| Limbahau（N27） | Limbahau | 175/27/07 | SMK St. Mary Papar |
| Limbahau（N27） | Biau | 175/27/08 | SK Sabandil; SK Padawan Besar |
| Limbahau（N27） | Rampazan | 175/27/09 | SK Rampazan |

=== Representation history ===
Members of the Legislative Assembly for Limbahau
| Assembly | No | Years | Member | Party |
Constituency created from Tambunan, Bingkor, Kawang and Pantai Manis
| 16th | N27 | 2020–2021 | Juil Nuatim | WARISAN |
| 16th | N27 | 2021–2022 | Juil Nuatim | Independent |
| 16th | N27 | 2022–2023 | Juil Nuatim | KDM |
| 16th | N27 | 2023–2025 | Juil Nuatim | GRS (Direct) |
| 17th | N27 | 2025–present | Juil Nuatim | GRS (PBS) |

== Election results ==
Sabah state election, 2025: Limbahau
| Party | Candidate | Votes | % | ∆% |
|---|---|---|---|---|
| GRS | Juil Nuatim | 6,444 | 43.36 | ▲43.36 |
| UPKO | Nelson Wences Angang | 3,124 | 21.02 | ▲21.02 |
| Heritage | Roger Roy Valentine Amandus | 2,150 | 14.47 | ▼41.63 |
| SAPP | Edward Dagul | 1,585 | 10.67 | ▲10.67 |
| KDM | Malik Luman | 1,007 | 6.78 | ▲6.78 |
| Independent | Marcellus Tambud | 257 | 1.73 | ▲1.73 |
| PN | Adrian Alexander | 189 | 1.27 | ▲1.27 |
| Sabah Dream Party | Joseph Philip Kulip | 68 | 0.46 | ▲0.46 |
| Independent | Linda Beda Dunstan | 37 | 0.25 | ▲0.25 |
| Total valid votes | | 14,861 | | |
| Total rejected ballots | | 148 | | |
| Unreturned ballots | | 17 | | |
| Turnout | | 15,026 | 74.29 | ▲1.62 |
| Registered electors | | 20,225 | | |
| Majority | | 3,320 | 22.34 | ▼4.91 |
| GRS gain from Heritage | | Swing | | ? |
Source(s) "RESULTS OF CONTESTED ELECTION AND STATEMENTS OF THE POLL AFTER THE OFFICIAL ADDITION OF VOTES" (PDF).

Sabah state election, 2020: Limbahau
| Party | Candidate | Votes | % |
|---|---|---|---|
| Sabah Heritage Party | Juil Nuatim | 5,194 | 56.10 |
| PBS | Johnny Mositun | 2,671 | 28.85 |
| LDP | Cornelius Frederick @ Michael Fj Sulip | 473 | 5.11 |
| Independent | Laurence Onjuman | 354 | 3.82 |
| Love Sabah Party | Aubrey G Sham | 249 | 2.69 |
| Independent | Pius Lokiom | 64 | 0.69 |
| USNO (Baru) | Susanna Jainim Jaris | 54 | 0.58 |
| GAGASAN | Evelyn June Charlie | 34 | 0.37 |
| Total valid votes | | 9,093 | 98.22 |
| Total rejected ballots | | 140 | 1.51 |
| Unreturned ballots | | 25 | 0.27 |
| Turnout | | 9,258 | 72.67 |
| Registered electors | | 12,739 | |
| Majority | | 2,523 | 27.25 |
This was a new constituency created.
