= Yong Teck Lee =

Malaysian politician and lawyer

Yang Berbahagia Datuk Seri Panglima Yong Teck Lee PJN SPDK PGDK
- 杨德利

10th Chief Minister of Sabah
- In office 28 May 1996 – 28 May 1998
- Governor: Sakaran Dandai
- Deputy: Abdul Ghapur Salleh; Joseph Kurup; Tham Nyip Shen
- Preceded by: Salleh Said Keruak
- Succeeded by: Bernard Giluk Dompok

Past Ministerial Roles (Sabah)
- 1986–1990: Assistant Minister of Local Government and Housing
- 1990–1994: Minister of Industrial Development
- 1994–1996: Deputy Chief Minister
- 1994–1996: Minister of Local Government and Housing

Nominated Member of the Sabah State Legislative Assembly
- In office 8 October 2020 – 6 October 2025 Serving with: Aliakbar Gulasan &; Amisah Yassin &; Jaffari Waliam &; Suhaimi Nasir &; Raime Unggi
- Chief Minister: Hajiji Noor

1st President of the Sabah Progressive Party
- Incumbent
- Assumed office 21 January 1994
- Deputy: Amde Sidik; Melanie Chia Chui Ket; Edward Dagul
- Preceded by: Position established

Faction represented in Dewan Rakyat
- 1999–2002: Barisan Nasional

Faction represented in the Sabah State Legislative Assembly
- 1985–1994: United Sabah Party
- 1994–2002: Barisan Nasional
- 2020–2024: Perikatan Nasional
- 2022–2025: Gabungan Rakyat Sabah

Personal details
- Born: Yong Teck Lee; 3 October 1958 (age 67) Lahad Datu, Crown Colony of North Borneo (now Sabah, Malaysia)
- Party: United Sabah Party (PBS) (until 1994); Sabah Progressive Party (SAPP) (since 1994)
- Other political affiliations: Barisan Nasional (BN) (until 2008); Perikatan Nasional (PN) (2020–2024); Gabungan Rakyat Sabah (GRS) (2022–2025)
- Spouse: Stella Kong Yin Kiun
- Occupation: Politician
- Profession: Lawyer

Yong Teck Lee (simplified Chinese: 杨德利; traditional Chinese: 楊德利; pinyin: Yáng Délì; born 3 October 1958), also known by his initials, YTL, is a Malaysian politician and lawyer who has served as a Nominated Member of the Sabah State Legislative Assembly (MLA) from October 2020 until October 2025 in the Gabungan Rakyat Sabah (GRS) state administration under Chief Minister Hajiji Noor He served as the 10th Chief Minister of Sabah from May 1996 to May 1998, Deputy Chief Minister of Sabah from July 1990 to December 1995, Member of Parliament (MP) for Gaya from November 1999 and MLA for Likas from April 1985 to September 2002. He has served as Nominated MLA of Sabah since October 2020 and 1st and founding President of the Sabah Progressive Party (SAPP), a component party of the Gabungan Rakyat Sabah (GRS) and formerly Perikatan Nasional (PN) coalitions, since January 1994. He is the Deputy Chairman of GRS and was the Deputy Chairman of PN.

== Political career ==
Yong became the Chief Minister of Sabah on 28 May 1996 to serve in a two-year rotation arranged by the Barisan Nasional (BN) coalition in the state. He had previously served as Deputy Chief Minister. In 1994 he resigned from the United Sabah Party (PBS), citing dissatisfaction with its leadership, and established the SAPP; however, the new party became a member of the Barisan Nasional (BN) coalition led in Sabah by the PBS. Lee led the SAPP in bolting from Barisan Nasional in 2008.

Before entering politics, Yong was a lawyer, having studied in London.

== Election results ==
Sabah State Legislative Assembly
| Year | Constituency | Candidate | Votes | Pct | Opponent(s) | Votes | Pct | Ballots cast | Majority | Turnout |
|---|---|---|---|---|---|---|---|---|---|---|
| 1985 | N28 Likas | Yong Teck Lee (PBS) | | | | | | | | |
| 1986 | N28 Likas | Yong Teck Lee (PBS) | 6,488 | 67.22% | Chin Kok Kong (BERJAYA) | 2,911 | 30.16% | 9,652 | 3,577 | 73.54% |
| 1986 | N28 Likas | Yong Teck Lee (PBS) | 6,488 | 67.22% | Chu Yee Ming (PCS) | 140 | 1.45% | 9,652 | 3,577 | 73.54% |
| 1986 | N28 Likas | Yong Teck Lee (PBS) | 6,488 | 67.22% | Kok Fung Chong (SCCP) | 38 | 0.39% | 9,652 | 3,577 | 73.54% |
| 1990 | N28 Likas | Yong Teck Lee (PBS) | 7,347 | 66.48% | Hussin Wahid Dally (USNO) | 2,219 | 20.08% | 11,052 | 5,128 | 71.52% |
| 1990 | N28 Likas | Yong Teck Lee (PBS) | 7,347 | 66.48% | Yan Ngai Nen (BERJAYA) | 626 | 5.66% | 11,052 | 5,128 | 71.52% |
| 1990 | N28 Likas | Yong Teck Lee (PBS) | 7,347 | 66.48% | Quek Yi Than (DAP) | 416 | 3.76% | 11,052 | 5,128 | 71.52% |
| 1990 | N28 Likas | Yong Teck Lee (PBS) | 7,347 | 66.48% | Frankie Yapp Lai Sing (PRS) | 176 | 1.59% | 11,052 | 5,128 | 71.52% |
| 1990 | N28 Likas | Yong Teck Lee (PBS) | 7,347 | 66.48% | Chin Nyuk Fatt (LDP) | 176 | 1.59% | 11,052 | 5,128 | 71.52% |
| 1994 | N28 Likas | Yong Teck Lee (SAPP) | 8,035 | 57.27% | Yee Moh Chai (PBS) | 5,855 | 41.73% | 14,030 | 2,180 | 71.02% |
| 1999 | N13 Likas | Yong Teck Lee (SAPP) | 9,110 | 51.42% | Chong Eng Leong (PBS) | 4,148 | 23.41% | 17,717 | 4,962 | 68.21% |
| 1999 | N13 Likas | Yong Teck Lee (SAPP) | 9,110 | 51.42% | Harris Salleh (BERSEKUTU) | 3,576 | 20.18% | 17,717 | 4,962 | 68.21% |
| 1999 | N13 Likas | Yong Teck Lee (SAPP) | 9,110 | 51.42% | Gamparan Lajah (SETIA) | 318 | 1.79% | 17,717 | 4,962 | 68.21% |
| 1999 | N13 Likas | Yong Teck Lee (SAPP) | 9,110 | 51.42% | Yahya Kassim (PAS) | 200 | 1.13% | 17,717 | 4,962 | 68.21% |
| 1999 | N13 Likas | Yong Teck Lee (SAPP) | 9,110 | 51.42% | Saudin Kadis (IND) | 100 | 0.56% | 17,717 | 4,962 | 68.21% |
| 2013 | N14 Likas | Yong Teck Lee (SAPP) | 1,487 | 12.82% | Wong Hong Jun (DAP) | 7,746 | 66.80% | 11,596 | 5,652 | 75.80% |
| 2013 | N14 Likas | Yong Teck Lee (SAPP) | 1,487 | 12.82% | Chin Shu Ying (LDP) | 2,094 | 18.06% | 11,596 | 5,652 | 75.80% |
| 2013 | N14 Likas | Yong Teck Lee (SAPP) | 1,487 | 12.82% | Ho Cheong Tshun (IND) | 155 | 1.34% | 11,596 | 5,652 | 75.80% |

== Honours ==
- Malaysia
  - Commander of the Order of Meritorious Service (PJN) – Datuk (1996)
- Sabah
  - Grand Commander of the Order of Kinabalu (SPDK) – Datuk Seri Panglima (2007)
  - Commander of the Order of Kinabalu (PGDK) – Datuk (1990)

Political offices
| Preceded by Salleh Said Keruak | Chief Minister of Sabah; 1996–1998 | Succeeded by Bernard Giluk Dompok |
