= Bengkoka =

State constituency in Sabah, Malaysia

Bengkoka (N02)
Sabah constituency

State constituency
- Legislature: Sabah State Legislative Assembly
MLA
Harun Durabi
BN
- Constituency created: 1974
- Constituency abolished: 2004
- Constituency re-created: 2019
- First contested: 1974
- Last contested: 2025

Demographics
- Electors (2025): 18,056

Bengkoka is a state constituency in Sabah, Malaysia, that is represented in the Sabah State Legislative Assembly. This is one of the thirteen new state constituencies as result of approval from state legislative and Dewan Rakyat on 17 July 2019 and presenting for the first time for snap election

== Demographics ==
Ethnic breakdown of Bengkoka's electorate as of 2025
1. Non-Muslim Bumiputera (55.0%)
2. Muslim Bumiputera (43.0%)
3. Other ethnicities (1.70%)
4. Chinese (0.30%)

== History ==
As of 2020, Bengkoka has a population of 18,399 people.

=== Polling districts ===
According to the gazette issued on 31 October 2022, the Bengkoka constituency has a total of 10 polling districts.

State constituency	Polling Districts	Code	Location
Bengkoka (N02)	Mengkubau	167/02/01	SK Manggis/Mongkubou
Bengkoka (N02)	Tanjung Piring	167/02/02	SK Mapan-Mapan
Bengkoka (N02)	Mangkapon	167/02/03	SK Mangkapon Pitas
Bengkoka (N02)	Kanibongan	167/02/04	SK Kanibongan
Bengkoka (N02)	Pantai	167/02/05	SK Pantai
Bengkoka (N02)	Kebatasan	167/02/06	SK Kusilad
Bengkoka (N02)	Penapak	167/02/07	SK Pinapak
Bengkoka (N02)	Dandun	167/02/08	SK Dandun
Bengkoka (N02)	Senaja	167/02/09	SK Senaja
Bengkoka (N02)	Pandan	167/02/10	SK Pandan Mandamai

=== Representation history ===
Members of the Legislative Assembly for Bengkoka
Assembly	No	Years	Member	Party
Constituency created from Bengkoka-Banggi
5th	N03	1976-1981	Abdul Salam Harun	BN (USNO)
6th	N03	1981-1985	Jasni Piut	USNO
7th	N03	1985-1986	Abdul Salam Harun	USNO
8th	N03	1986-1990	Yussof Abd Manan	USNO
9th	N03	1990-1994	Paul Tom Imbayan	GR (PBS)
10th	N03	1994-1999	Masrani Parman	BN (UMNO)
11th	N03	1999-2004	Masrani Parman	BN (UMNO)
Constituency renamed to Pitas
Constituency re-created from Banggi and Pitas
16th	N02	2020–2025	Harun Durabi	BN (UMNO)
17th	N02	2025–present	Harun Durabi	BN (UMNO)

== Election results ==
Sabah state election, 2025: Bengkoka
Party	Candidate	Votes	%	∆%
BN	Harun Durabi	2,485	20.96	▼10.48
GRS	Samuil Mopun	2,408	20.31	▲20.31
Homeland Solidarity Party	Maklin Masiau	1,899	16.02	▲16.02
KDM	Rahim Richard Mazagi	1,528	12.89	▲12.89
Heritage	Fauziah Stephens	1,290	10.88	▲10.88
Independent	Jomin Mogompit	1,084	9.14	▲9.14
UPKO	Junsim Rumunzing	622	5.25	▲5.25
PN	Berusli Kimin	310	2.61	▲2.61
Sabah Dream Party	Matin Ugung	183	1.54	▲1.54
PBK	Gunsanad Malingka	26	0.22	▲0.22
Independent	Mohd Izahan Abdullah	21	0.18	▲0.18
Total valid votes		11,856		
Total rejected ballots		117		
Unreturned ballots		17		
Turnout		12,050	66.74	▼2.00
Registered electors		18,056		
Majority		77	0.62	▼15.94
BN hold		Swing		{{{2}}}
Source(s) "RESULTS OF CONTESTED ELECTION AND STATEMENTS OF THE POLL AFTER THE OFFICIAL ADDITION OF VOTES" (PDF).

Sabah state election, 2020: Bengkoka
Party	Candidate	Votes	%	∆%
BN	Harun Durabi	2,538	31.44	
UPKO	Junsim Rumunzing	1,201	14.88	
Independent	Maklin Masiau	1,149	14.23	
PBS	Dr. Samuil Mopun	898	11.12	
Independent	Pransol Tiying	731	9.05	
Independent	Akian Ah Kiew	576	7.13	
Independent	Mary Eugenie Dumpangol @ Aminah Ambrose	399	4.94	
USNO (Baru)	Omar Jalun	174	2.16	
Love Sabah Party	Jose Modsinupu	159	1.97	
GAGASAN	Sotijin Juhui	91	1.13	
Sabah People's Unity Party	Rita Cham	19	0.24	
Total valid votes		7,935	98.29	
Total rejected ballots		125	1.55	
Unreturned ballots		13	0.16	
Turnout		8,073	68.74	
Registered electors		11,543		
Majority		1,337	16.56	
BN hold		Swing		{{{2}}}

Sabah state election, 1999: Bengkoka
Party	Candidate	Votes	%	∆%
BN	Masrani Parman	4,042	57.50	▲0.77
PBS	Richard Mazagi	2,121	30.17	▼13.10
Independent	Paul Tom Imbayan	558	7.94	▲7.94
BERSEKUTU	Dg. Maimunah Mustapha	211	3.00	▲3.00
SETIA	Tsen Kwet Chong	97	1.38	▲1.38
Total valid votes		7,029	100.00	
Total rejected ballots		110		
Unreturned ballots		0		
Turnout		7,139	68.75	▼0.84
Registered electors		10,384		
Majority		1,921	27.33	▲13.87
BN hold		Swing		

Sabah state election, 1994: Bengkoka
Party	Candidate	Votes	%	∆%
BN	Masrani Parman	3,511	56.73	▲56.73
PBS	Paul Tom Imbayan	2,678	43.27	▼5.09
Total valid votes		6,189	100.00	
Total rejected ballots		96		
Unreturned ballots		1		
Turnout		6,286	69.59	▼1.62
Registered electors		9,033		
Majority		833	13.46	▲6.53
BN hold		Swing		

Sabah state election, 1990: Bengkoka
Party	Candidate	Votes	%	∆%
BN	Paul Tom Imbayan	2,492	48.36	▲12.04
BN	Masrani Parman	2,135	41.43	▲2.61
PRS	Johnes Piut	261	5.07	▲5.07
Parti Bersatu Rakyat Jelata Sabah	Alin Dolong	161	3.12	▼10.89
AKAR	Molupin Mojulou	71	1.38	▲1.38
Independent	Puddin Paitu	33	0.64	▼1.11
Total valid votes		5,153	100.00	
Total rejected ballots		65		
Unreturned ballots		0		
Turnout		5,218	71.21	▲2.89
Registered electors		7,328		
Majority		357	6.93	▲4.43
BN gain from USNO		Swing		-

Sabah state election, 1986: Bengkoka
Party	Candidate	Votes	%	∆%
USNO	Yussof Abd. Manan	1,862	38.82	▼7.85
PBS	Paul Tom Imbayan	1,742	36.32	▲4.83
BN	Fauziah Mohd. Fuad Stephens	672	14.01	▼2.76
Independent	Johnes Piut	436	9.09	▲9.09
Independent	Chee Syn Fook	84	1.75	▲1.75
Total valid votes		4,796	100.00	
Total rejected ballots		73		
Unreturned ballots		0		
Turnout		4,869	68.32	▲0.72
Registered electors		7,127		
Majority		120	2.50	▼12.68
USNO hold		Swing		

Sabah state election, 1985: Bengkoka
Party	Candidate	Votes	%	∆%
USNO	Abdul Salam Harun	2,112	46.67	▲12.12
PBS	Akian Ah Kiew	1,425	31.49	▲31.49
BERJAYA	Md Zakaria Said	759	16.77	▼47.09
BERSEPADU	Aplasin Ejal	154	3.40	▲3.40
PASOK	Sait Guik	75	1.66	▲1.10
Total valid votes		4,525	100.00	
Total rejected ballots		105		
Unreturned ballots		0		
Turnout		4,630	67.60	▼2.67
Registered electors		6,849		
Majority		687	15.18	▼14.13
USNO gain from BN		Swing		-

Sabah state election, 1981: Bengkoka
Party	Candidate	Votes	%	∆%
USNO	Johnes Piut	2,305	63.87	▲23.37
BERJAYA	Muhamad Said	1,247	34.55	▼24.56
Independent	Ali Akbar	37	1.03	▲0.63
PASOK	Jair Mattahir	20	0.55	▲0.55
Total valid votes		3,609	100.00	
Total rejected ballots		47		
Unreturned ballots		0		
Turnout		3,656	70.27	▼5.70
Registered electors		5,203		
Majority		1,058	29.32	▲10.70
BN gain from Alliance		Swing		-

Sabah state election, 1976: Bengkoka
Party	Candidate	Votes	%
USNO	Abdul Salam Harun	1,959	59.11
BERJAYA	Manjil Madalag	1,342	40.49
Independent	Osman Abdul Rahman	13	0.39
Total valid votes		3,314	100.00
Total rejected ballots		88	
Unreturned ballots		0	
Turnout		3,402	75.97
Registered electors		4,478	
Majority		617	18.62
This was a new constituency created
