= Sebatik (state constituency) =

Political subdivision in Malaysia

Sebatik (N73)
Sabah constituency

State constituency
- Legislature: Sabah State Legislative Assembly
MLA
Manahing Tinggilani
Heritage
- Constituency created: 2003
- First contested: 2004
- Last contested: 2025

Demographics
- Electors (2025): 16,893

Sebatik is a state constituency in Sabah, Malaysia, that is represented in the Sabah State Legislative Assembly.

== Demographics ==
As of 2020, Sebatik has a population of 52,407 people.

Ethnic breakdown of Sebatik's electorate as of 2025
1. Muslim Bumiputera (90.0%)
2. Non-Muslim Bumiputera (9.50%)
3. Chinese (0.50%)
4. Other ethnicities (0.00%)

== History ==
=== Polling districts ===
According to the gazette issued on 31 October 2022, the Sebatik constituency has a total of 7 polling districts.

State constituency	Polling District	Code	Location
Sebatik (N73)	Luasong	191/73/01	SK Luasong
Sebatik (N73)	Kalabakan	191/73/02	SK Kalabakan; SMK Kalabakan
Sebatik (N73)	Umas-Umas	191/73/03	SK Umas-Umas; SMK Umas-Umas
Sebatik (N73)	Sarudung Laut	191/73/04	Balai Raya Sarudung Laut
Sebatik (N73)	Sebatik	191/73/05	SK Wallace Bay
Sebatik (N73)	Tamang	191/73/06	SK Mentadak Baru
Sebatik (N73)	Bergosong	191/73/07	SK Bergosong

=== Representation history ===
Member of Sabah State Legislative Assembly for Sebatik
Assembly	No	Years	Member	Party
Constituency created from Kalabakan
12th	N60	2004–2008	Patawari Patawe	BN (UMNO)
13th	N60	2008–2013	Abdul Muis Picho	BN (UMNO)
14th	N60	2013–2018	Abdul Muis Picho	BN (UMNO)
15th	N60	2018	Abdul Muis Picho	BN (UMNO)
15th	N60	2018–2020	Abdul Muis Picho	WARISAN
15th	N60	2020	Abdul Muis Picho	Independent
16th	N73	2020–2021	Hassan A. Gani Pg. Amir	WARISAN
16th	N73	2021–2022	Hassan A. Gani Pg. Amir	GRS (BERSATU)
16th	N73	2022–2023	Hassan A. Gani Pg. Amir	GRS (Direct)
16th	N73	2023–2025	Hassan A. Gani Pg. Amir	GRS (GAGASAN)
17th	N73	2025–present	Manahing Tinggilani	WARISAN

== Election results ==
Sabah state election, 2025
Party	Candidate	Votes	%	∆%
Heritage	Manahing Tinggilani	2,795	27.03	▼16.35
GRS	Hassan A. Gani Pg. Amir	2,645	25.58	▲25.58
BN	Aslan Fadli Samsul Alang	1,968	19.03	▲19.03
Independent	Husni Frans	1,827	17.67	▲17.67
PN	Suhurani Sammani	440	4.25	▼30.64
Sabah Native Co-operation Party	Saharan Untai	298	2.88	▲2.88
Homeland Solidarity Party	Kadri Amat	266	2.57	▲2.57
Sabah Clan Party	Ismail Idris	41	0.40	▲0.40
Sabah Dream Party	Abdul Gaib Aliaman	40	0.39	▲0.39
Sabah People's Unity Party	Abu Bakar Kumun	21	0.20	▲0.20
Total valid votes		10,341		
Total rejected ballots		186		
Unreturned ballots		28		
Turnout		10,555	62.48	▲1.84
Registered electors		16,893		
Majority		150	1.45	▼7.04
Sabah Heritage Party hold		Swing		
Source(s) "RESULTS OF CONTESTED ELECTION AND STATEMENTS OF THE POLL AFTER THE OFFICIAL ADDITION OF VOTES" (PDF).

Sabah state election, 2020
Party	Candidate	Votes	%	∆%
Sabah Heritage Party	Hassan A. Gani Pg. Amir	2,665	43.38	▲1.10
PN	Abdul Muis Picho	2,143	34.89	▲34.89
Love Sabah Party	Abdul Samat Akui	504	8.20	▲8.20
USNO (Baru)	Hassan Ibrahim	253	4.12	▲4.12
Independent	Mohd Balbir Arjan	183	2.98	▲2.98
Sabah People's Unity Party	Baharuddin Basrie	140	2.28	▲1.58
Independent	Juhuran Kalmin	90	1.47	▲1.47
Total valid votes		5,978	97.31	
Total rejected ballots		129	2.10	
Unreturned ballots		36	0.59	
Turnout		6,143	60.64	▼10.20
Registered electors		10,131		
Majority		522	8.49	▲4.92
Sabah Heritage Party gain from BN		Swing		-
Source(s) "RESULTS OF CONTESTED ELECTION AND STATEMENTS OF THE POLL AFTER THE OFFICIAL ADDITION OF VOTES".

Sabah state election, 2018
Party	Candidate	Votes	%	∆%
BN	Abdul Muis Picho	2,468	45.75	▼26.26
Sabah Heritage Party	Hassan A. Gani Pg. Amir	2,275	42.18	▲42.18
PAS	Rozlan Ramli	504	9.34	▼8.31
Sabah People's Unity Party	Yusri Yunus	38	0.70	▲0.70
Total valid votes		5,285	97.98	
Total rejected ballots		109	2.02	
Unreturned ballots		0	0.00	
Turnout		5,394	70.84	▼4.64
Registered electors		7,614		
Majority		193	3.57	▼50.79
BN hold		Swing		
Source(s) "RESULTS OF CONTESTED ELECTION AND STATEMENTS OF THE POLL AFTER THE OFFICIAL ADDITION OF VOTES".

Sabah state election, 2013
Party	Candidate	Votes	%	∆%
BN	Abdul Muis Picho	5,484	72.01	▼3.04
PAS	Daud Jalaluddin	1,344	17.65	▲17.65
Independent	Mohamad Yusup Lewah	249	3.27	▲3.27
STAR	Mohammad Jeffry Rosman	225	2.95	▲2.95
Total valid votes		7,302	95.88	
Total rejected ballots		293	3.85	
Unreturned ballots		21	0.28	
Turnout		7,616	75.48	▲9.48
Registered electors		10,090		
Majority		4,140	54.36	▼6.67
BN hold		Swing		
Source(s) "KEPUTUSAN PILIHAN RAYA UMUM DEWAN UNDANGAN NEGERI". Archived from the original on 2022-10-16.

Sabah state election, 2008
Party	Candidate	Votes	%	∆%
BN	Abdul Muis Picho	4,711	75.05	▼6.39
PKR	Arsad Jamal	880	14.02	▲14.02
Independent	Raden Kakung	392	6.25	▲6.25
Total valid votes		5,983	95.32	
Total rejected ballots		110	1.75	
Unreturned ballots		184	2.93	
Turnout		6,277	66.00	▲6.43
Registered electors		9,510		
Majority		3,831	61.03	▼11.59
BN hold		Swing		
Source(s) "KEPUTUSAN PILIHAN RAYA UMUM DEWAN UNDANGAN NEGERI SABAH BAGI TAHUN 2008".

Sabah state election, 2004
Party	Candidate	Votes	%
BN	Patawari Patawe	4,708	81.44
SETIA	Mohd Eddris Jikirun	510	8.82
PAS	Abdul Wahid Yemang	452	7.82
Total valid votes		5,670	98.08
Total rejected ballots		111	1.92
Unreturned ballots		0	0.00
Turnout		5,781	59.57
Registered electors		9,705	
Majority		4,198	72.62
This was a new constituency created.
Source(s) "KEPUTUSAN PILIHAN RAYA UMUM DEWAN UNDANGAN NEGERI SABAH BAGI TAHUN 2004".
