= Labuk =

State constituency in Sabah, Malaysia

Labuk (N49)
Sabah constituency

State constituency
- Legislature: Sabah State Legislative Assembly
MLA
Samad Jambri
GRS
- Constituency created: 1967
- First contested: 1967
- Last contested: 2025

Demographics
- Electors (2025): 14,564

Labuk is a state constituency in Sabah, Malaysia, that is represented in the Sabah State Legislative Assembly.

== Demographics ==
As of 2020, Labuk has a population of 28,449 people.

Ethnic breakdown of Labuk's electorate as of 2025
1. Muslim Bumiputera (68.0%)
2. Non-Muslim Bumiputera (31.0%)
3. Chinese (1.00%)
4. Other ethnicities (0.00%)

== History ==
=== Polling districts ===
According to the gazette issued on 31 October 2022, the Labuk constituency has a total of 8 polling districts.

State constituency	Polling Districts	Code	Location
Labuk (N49)	Kaniogan	183/49/01	SK Keniogan
Labuk (N49)	Tetabuan	183/49/02	SK Tetabuan
Labuk (N49)	Kolapis	183/49/03	SK Kolapis
Labuk (N49)	Klagan	183/49/04	SK Bukit Besi
Labuk (N49)	Sapi	183/49/05	SK Holy Cross
Labuk (N49)	Sungai Nangka	183/49/06	SK Sungai Nangka; SK Balaban Jaya
Labuk (N49)	Pekan Beluran	183/49/07	SMK Beluran
Labuk (N49)	Muanad	183/49/08	SMK Beluran II; SK Pekan Beluran

=== Representation history ===
Member of Sabah State Legislative Assembly for Labuk
Assembly	No	Years	Member	Party
Constituency created
3rd	N26	1967 – 1971	Jimmy Malis	UPKO
4th	N26	1971 – 1976	Salleh Otik	Alliance (USNO)
5th	N12	1976	Paul Baklin	BERJAYA
5th	N12	1976 – 1981	Paul Baklin	BN (BERJAYA)
6th	N12	1981 – 1985	Paul Baklin	BN (BERJAYA)
7th	N16	1985 – 1986	Tan Yong Gee (陈永基)	PBS
8th	N16	1986 – 1990	Tan Yong Gee (陈永基)	PBS
9th	N16	1990 – 1994	Tan Yong Gee (陈永基)	GR (PBS)
10th	N16	1994	Tan Yong Gee (陈永基)	GR (PBS)
10th	N16	1994 – 1999	Tan Yong Gee (陈永基)	BN (PDS)
11th	N33	1999 – 2002	Metah Asang	PBS
11th	N33	2002 – 2004	Metah Asang	BN (PBS)
12th	N40	2004 – 2008	Metah Asang	BN (PBS)
13th	N40	2008 – 2013	Metah Asang	BN (PBS)
14th	N40	2013 – 2018	Metah Asang	BN (PBS)
15th	N40	2018	Abdul Rahman Kongkawang	BN (PBS)
15th	N40	2018 – 2019	Abdul Rahman Kongkawang	PBS
15th	N40	2019 – 2020	Abdul Rahman Kongkawang	WARISAN
15th	N40	2020	Abdul Rahman Kongkawang	Independent
16th	N49	2020 – 2022	Samad Jambri	GRS (BERSATU)
16th	N49	2022 - 2023	Samad Jambri	GRS (Direct)
16th	N49	2023–2025	Samad Jambri	GRS (GAGASAN)
17th	N49	2025–present	Samad Jambri	GRS (GAGASAN)

== Election results ==
Sabah state election, 2025: Labuk
Party	Candidate	Votes	%	∆%
GRS	Samad Jambri	2,885	31.70	▲31.70
BN	Yusoflatif Mustapah	1,906	20.94	▲20.94
Heritage	Jafar Awang	1,411	15.50	▲15.50
PN	Asmad Nasir	1,364	14.99	▼30.38
UPKO	Norfadzlina Ramsah	1,081	11.88	▼13.20
KDM	Marx Henry Lim	232	2.55	▲2.55
Sabah Dream Party	Junsik @ Joseph Imus	185	2.03	▲2.03
Sabah Native Co-operation Party	Nuralizah Lee Abdullah	38	0.42	▲0.42
Total valid votes		9,102		
Total rejected ballots		240		
Unreturned ballots		10		
Turnout		9,352	64.21	▼2.29
Registered electors		14,564		
Majority		979	10.76	▼9.53
GRS gain from PN		Swing		?
Source(s) "RESULTS OF CONTESTED ELECTION AND STATEMENTS OF THE POLL AFTER THE OFFICIAL ADDITION OF VOTES" (PDF).

Sabah state election, 2020: Labuk
Party	Candidate	Votes	%	∆%
PN	Samad Jambri	2,701	45.37	▲45.37
UPKO	Dennis Rantau	1,493	25.08	▲25.08
Independent	Abdul Rahman Kongkawang	1,441	24.21	▲24.21
Love Sabah Party	Fidelis Michael	115	1.93	▼1.08
USNO (Baru)	Suhaimi Miasin	108	1.81	▲1.81
Total valid votes		5,858	98.40	
Total rejected ballots		77	1.29	
Unreturned ballots		18	0.30	
Turnout		5,953	66.50	▼9.26
Registered electors		8,952		
Majority		1,208	20.29	▼0.13
PN gain from BN		Swing		?
Source(s) "RESULTS OF CONTESTED ELECTION AND STATEMENTS OF THE POLL AFTER THE OFFICIAL ADDITION OF VOTES".

Sabah state election, 2018: Labuk
Party	Candidate	Votes	%	∆%
BN	Abdul Rahman Kongkawang	6,665	52.34	▼10.78
Sabah Heritage Party	Ramsah Tasim @ Tashim	4,065	31.92	▲31.92
STAR	Rainus Awang	1,171	9.20	▼1.35
Love Sabah Party	James Miki	383	3.01	▲3.01
Sabah Nationality Party	Albert T Enti	141	1.11	▲1.11
Total valid votes		12,425	97.58	
Total rejected ballots		247	1.94	
Unreturned ballots		61	0.48	
Turnout		12,733	75.76	▼2.42
Registered electors		16,806		
Majority		2,600	20.42	▼18.15
BN hold		Swing		
Source(s) "RESULTS OF CONTESTED ELECTION AND STATEMENTS OF THE POLL AFTER THE OFFICIAL ADDITION OF VOTES".

Sabah state election, 2013: Labuk
Party	Candidate	Votes	%	∆%
BN	Metah Asang	7,408	63.12	▼15.53
PKR	Tan Yong Gee	2,882	24.55	▲15.35
STAR	Pinus Gondili	1,238	10.55	▲10.55
Total valid votes		11,528	98.22	
Total rejected ballots		209	1.78	
Unreturned ballots		0	0.00	
Turnout		11,737	78.18	▲9.26
Registered electors		15,013		
Majority		4,526	38.57	▼30.88
BN hold		Swing		
Source(s) "KEPUTUSAN PILIHAN RAYA UMUM DEWAN UNDANGAN NEGERI".

Sabah state election, 2008: Labuk
Party	Candidate	Votes	%	∆%
BN	Metah Asang	6,178	78.65	
PKR	Sipin Kadandi	723	9.20	
Independent	Mervin Enti	657	8.36	
Independent	Yusof @ Joseph Apok	107	1.36	
Total valid votes		7,665	97.58	
Total rejected ballots		161	2.05	
Unreturned ballots		29	0.37	
Turnout		7,855	68.92	
Registered electors		11,397		
Majority		5,455	69.45	
BN hold		Swing		
Source(s) "KEPUTUSAN PILIHAN RAYA UMUM DEWAN UNDANGAN NEGERI SABAH BAGI TAHUN 2008".

Sabah state election, 2004: Labuk
Party	Candidate	Votes	%	∆%
On the nomination day, Metah Asang won uncontested.
BN	Metah Asang			
Total valid votes				
Total rejected ballots				
Unreturned ballots				
Turnout				
Registered electors		11,398		
Majority				
BN gain from PBS		Swing		?
Source(s) "KEPUTUSAN PILIHAN RAYA UMUM DEWAN UNDANGAN NEGERI SABAH BAGI TAHUN 2004".

Sabah state election, 1999: Labuk
Party	Candidate	Votes	%	∆%
PBS	Metah Asang	4,478	51.09	▲1.72
BN	Tan Yong Gee	3,349	38.21	▲5.15
Independent	Liaw Teck King	393	4.48	▲4.48
BERSEKUTU	Abdul Aziz Mohd Nasroh	217	2.48	▲2.48
SETIA	Yusof @ Joseph Apok	77	0.88	▲0.88
Independent	Nordin Khani	46	0.52	▲0.52
Independent	Kamar Karim	34	0.39	▲0.39
Total valid votes		8,594	98.05	
Total rejected ballots		171	1.95	
Unreturned ballots		0	0.00	
Turnout		8,765	75.85	▲1.30
Registered electors		11,556		
Majority		1,129	12.88	▼3.43
PBS hold		Swing		
Source(s) "KEPUTUSAN PILIHAN RAYA UMUM DEWAN UNDANGAN NEGERI SABAH BAGI TAHUN 1999".

Sabah state election, 1994: Labuk
Party	Candidate	Votes	%	∆%
PBS	Tan Yong Gee	3,256	49.37	▼3.11
BN	Thamrin Mohd Zaini	2,180	33.06	▲8.17
Independent	Dennis Twening Rantau	1,087	16.48	▲16.48
Total valid votes		6,523	98.91	
Total rejected ballots		72	1.09	
Unreturned ballots		0	0.00	
Turnout		6,595	74.55	▼1.01
Registered electors		8,847		
Majority		1,076	16.31	▼11.28
PBS hold		Swing		
Source(s) "KEPUTUSAN PILIHAN RAYA UMUM DEWAN UNDANGAN NEGERI SABAH BAGI TAHUN 1994".

Sabah state election, 1990: Labuk
Party	Candidate	Votes	%	∆%
PBS	Tan Yong Gee	3,167	52.48	▼0.07
USNO	Hamza Abdullah	1,502	24.89	▲3.00
PRS	Paul Baklin Gurandi	811	13.44	▲13.44
BERJAYA	Salleh Otik	345	5.72	▼18.60
AKAR	Thamrin Mohd Zaini	140	2.32	▲2.32
Total valid votes		5,965	98.84	
Total rejected ballots		70	1.16	
Unreturned ballots		0	0.00	
Turnout		6,035	75.56	▲2.26
Registered electors		7,987		
Majority		1,665	27.59	▼0.64
PBS hold		Swing		
Source(s) "KEPUTUSAN PILIHAN RAYA UMUM DEWAN UNDANGAN NEGERI SABAH BAGI TAHUN 1990".

Sabah state election, 1986: Labuk
Party	Candidate	Votes	%	∆%
PBS	Tan Yong Gee	2,638	53.21	▲11.82
BERJAYA	Paul Baklin O.T. Gurandi	1,221	24.63	▲3.62
Independent	Juslie Ajirol	1,099	22.17	▲22.17
Total valid votes		4,958	100.00	
Total rejected ballots		1,417		
Unreturned ballots		0		
Turnout		6,375	73.30	▲1.68
Registered electors		8,694		
Majority		1,417	28.56	
PBS hold		Swing		

Sabah state election, 1985: Labuk
Party	Candidate	Votes	%	∆%
PBS	Tan Yong Gee	1,727	41.39	▲41.39
BERJAYA	Paul Baklin O.T. Gurandi	1,179	28.25	▲28.25
Independent	Jabran Yahiya	1,080	25.88	▲25.88
Independent	Mohamad Omar Amsulong	116	2.78	▲2.78
Independent	Abdul Razak Mohd Harris	71	1.70	▲1.70
Total valid votes		4,173	100.00	
Total rejected ballots		548		
Unreturned ballots		0		
Turnout		4,721	71.62	▼0.51
Registered electors		6,589		
Majority		548	13.13	▼55.10
PBS gain from BERJAYA		Swing		.

Sabah state election, 1981: Labuk
Party	Candidate	Votes	%	∆%
BERJAYA	Paul Baklin O.T. Gurandi	2,411	76.78	▲48.78
Independent	Rahia Lahami	638	20.32	▲20.32
Independent	Ali Hassan Asibin	71	2.26	▲2.26
Independent	Jimmy Malis	20	0.64	▲0.64
Total valid votes		3,140	100.00	
Total rejected ballots		1,773		
Unreturned ballots		0		
Turnout		4,913	72.13	▲11.61
Registered electors		6,815		
Majority		1,773	56.43	▼18.35
BERJAYA hold		Swing		

Sabah state election, 1976: Labuk
Party	Candidate	Votes	%	∆%
BERJAYA	Paul Baklin O.T. Gurandi	1,304	60.31	▲60.31
USNO	Abd Majid Enti	858	39.69	▲39.69
Total valid votes		2,162	100.00	
Total rejected ballots		446		
Unreturned ballots		0		
Turnout		2,608	78.24	▲2.56
Registered electors		3,334		
Majority		446	20.62	▲20.62
USNO gain from BERJAYA		Swing		.

Sabah state election, 1971: Labuk
Party	Candidate	Votes	%	∆%
On the nomination day, Salleh O.T. Otik won uncontested.
USNO	Salleh O.T. Otik			
Total valid votes				
Total rejected ballots				
Unreturned ballots				
Turnout				
Registered electors				
Majority				
USNO hold		Swing		

Sabah state election, 1967: Labuk
Party	Candidate	Votes	%
United Pasokmomogun Kadazandusun Murut Organisation	Jimmy Malis	2,377	50.66
USNO	Salleh O.T. Otik	2,315	49.34
Total valid votes		4,692	100.00
Total rejected ballots		62	
Unreturned ballots		0	
Turnout		4,754	86.57
Registered electors		5,489	
Majority		62	1.32
This was a new seat created.
