= Order of Kinabalu =

Conferred by the Governor of Sabah

Order of Kinabalu Darjah Yang Amat Mulia Kinabalu
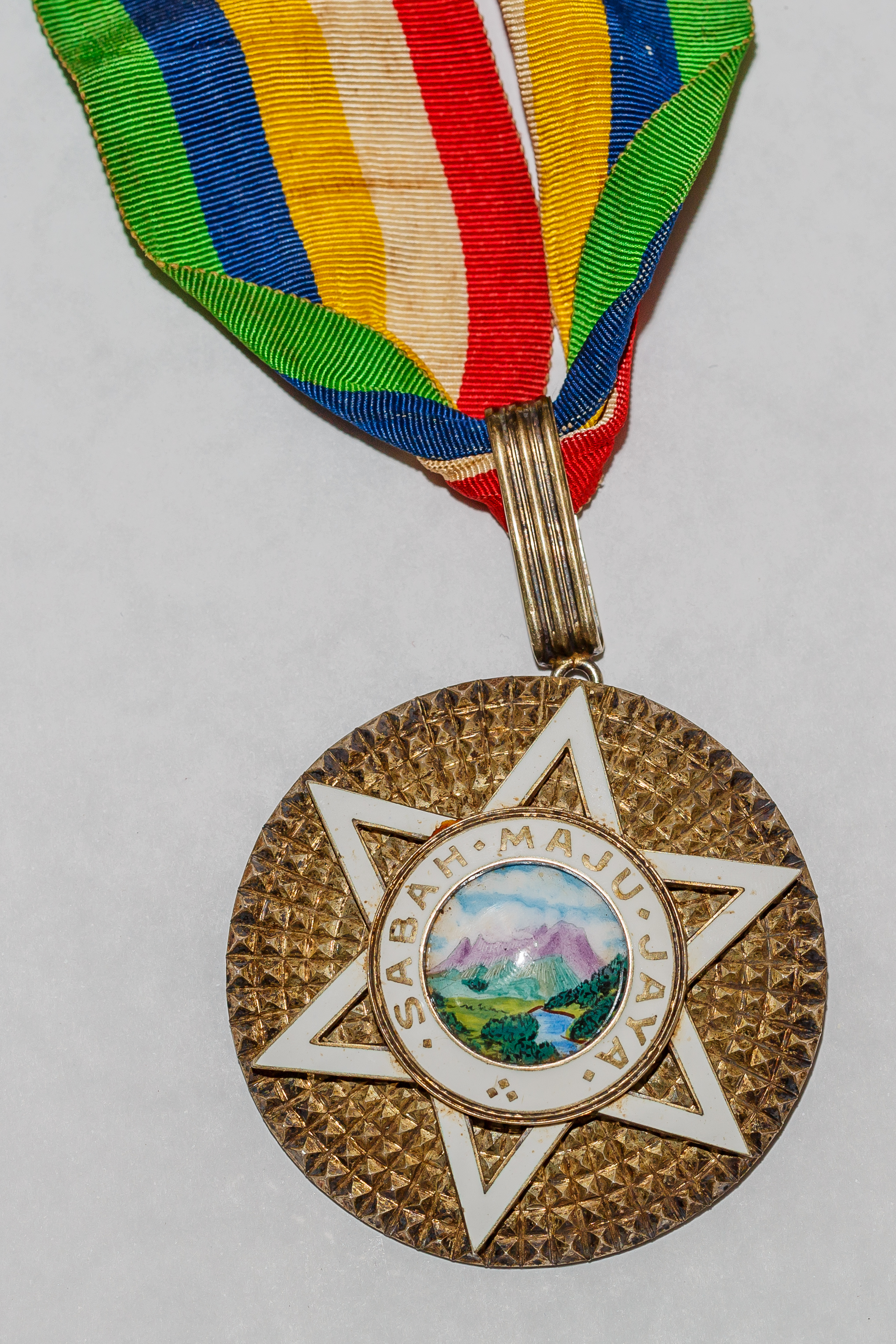
- Companion of the Order of Kinabalu

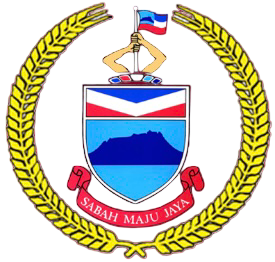
Awarded by The Governor of Sabah
- Type: State order
- Motto: Sabah Maju Jaya (Sabah Develop and Excel)
- Eligibility: All citizens of Malaysia
- Awarded for: Meritorious and outstanding services for Sabah and sometimes at the Governor's pleasure
- Status: Currently enacted
- Grades: Grand Commander (SPDK); Commander (PGDK); Companion (ASDK); Member (ADK)

Precedence
- Next (lower): Medals of State

The Illustrious Order of Kinabalu (Malay: Darjah Yang Amat Mulia Kinabalu) is the only order conferred by the Governor of Sabah, Malaysia.

== Background ==
The Illustrious Order of Kinabalu is established by virtue of Section 3(a) of State Honours Enactment 1963. The Enactment deals with all aspects including process of nomination, conferral, wearing of medals, promotion in the Order and quotas.

Appointments to the Order are made to persons who have rendered "meritorious service to the State". Appointment to the Order is submitted to the Governor by the Chief Minister; every appointment to the Order is by warrant under the hand of the Governor.

Non-citizens may be appointed as honorary members of the Order. An example is Shane Leslie Stone, former Chief Minister of Northern Territory, Australia who was made a Commander of the Order in 1998.

The motto of the Order is Sabah Maju Jaya (Sabah Advances Victorious). The Governor is the Patron of the Order, and is deemed a member of the First Grade. A Chancellor is selected by the Governor from amongst the members of the First Grade.

== Classes ==
This Order comprises four classes: Grand Commander, Commander, Companion and Member.

=== Grand Commander ===
Seri Panglima Darjah Kinabalu (SPDK) - Datuk Seri Panglima

The Grand Commander of the Order of Kinabalu (Malay: Seri Panglima Darjah Kinabalu) (SPDK) is the highest class of the order. The bearer of this order brings the title of "Datuk Seri Panglima", while the wife of the male bearer bears the title of "Datin Seri Panglima". Husband of the woman bearer brings no title.

This class of order has the star, badge, sash and collar. This class of order was limited to 200 living recipients only, excluding the Governor, former Governors and honorary recipients.

The Governor-designate receives this class of the order automatically on the date of his inauguration.

=== Commander ===
- Panglima Gemilang Darjah Kinabalu (PGDK) - Datuk

Commander of the Order of Kinabalu (Malay: Panglima Gemilang Darjah Kinabalu) (PGDK) is the second class of the order. The recipients bear the title of Datuk and Datin for the bearer's wife. This order class was limited to 1,600 living recipients only, excluding honorary recipients. This order has the sash, the badge and the star.

=== Companion ===
Ahli Setia Darjah Kinabalu (ASDK)

Companion of the Order of Kinabalu (Malay: Ahli Setia Darjah Kinabalu) (ASDK) is the third class of this order. This order class bears no title to its recipients. This award is conferred to those who had the high position in the community and served more to Sabah, but has unequal influence and service with the Commanders.

=== Member ===
Ahli Darjah Kinabalu (ADK)

Member of the Order of Kinabalu (Malay: Ahli Darjah Kinabalu) (ADK) is the lowest class of this order, also brings no title like the Companions. The position, service and influence of this award bearer is lower than the others but higher than the recipients of the Medals of State.
