= Chief Minister of Sabah =

Head of government of Sabah

- Ketua Menteri Sabah

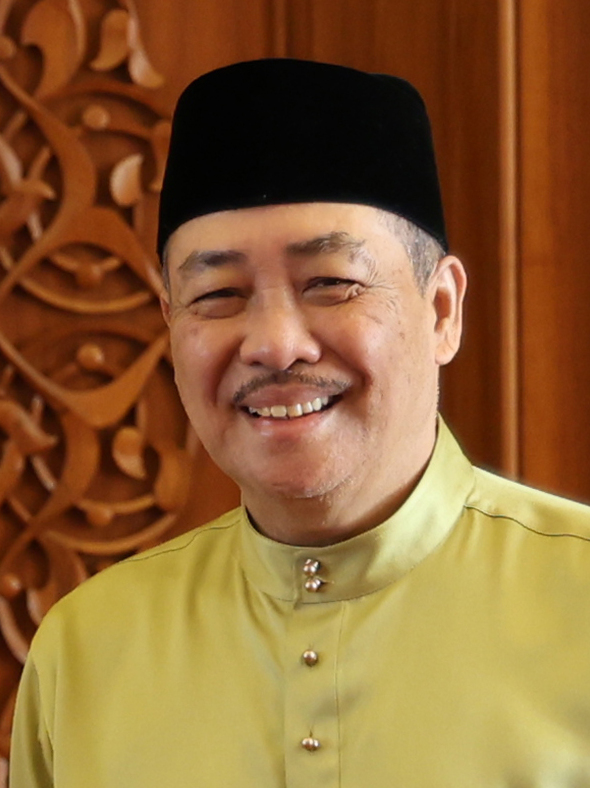
- Incumbent; Datuk Seri Panglima Haji Hajiji Noor since 29 September 2020
- Government of Sabah
- Style: The Most Honourable
- Status: Head of Government
- Member of: Cabinet of Sabah
- Reports to: Sabah State Legislative Assembly
- Residence: Seri Gaya, Kota Kinabalu, Sabah
- Seat: 32nd and 33rd Floor, Sabah State Administrative Centre, 88502 Kota Kinabalu, Sabah
- Appointer: Governor
- Term length: 5 years or less, renewable once (while commanding the confidence of the Sabah State Legislative Assembly; With State Elections held no more than five years apart)
- Constituting instrument: Constitution of the State of Sabah
- Inaugural holder: Fuad Stephens
- Formation: 16 September 1963; 62 years ago
- Deputy: Deputy Chief Minister
- Website: www.sabah.gov.my/cm/

The chief minister of Sabah is the head of government of Sabah, Malaysia. Since September 2020, the position has been held by Hajiji Noor from the Parti Gagasan Rakyat Sabah (Gagasan Rakyat) from the coalition of Gabungan Rakyat Sabah (GRS) which had won the 2020 Sabah state election. As in other parts of the Malaysian federation, the Westminster Parliamentary system is adopted, whereby, the leader of the party with the most seats in the state legislature would usually become the chief minister of Sabah. In other words, it is the person commanding the support of the state legislature. The chief minister is appointed by the head of state known as the Yang di-Pertua Negeri. In comparison to other states in Malaysia, the office of the chief minister of Sabah has been held by a more diverse group of people in terms of ethnicity and religion. The post has been held by Kadazan-Dusuns, Bajaus, Malays, Chinese, Muruts, Rungus, Sungai, Idaans, and other persons of mixed heritage as well as being Muslims, Buddhists and Christians.

In terms of official position in the current federal administrative structure, the chief minister of Sabah is ranked fifth in the federal hierarchy, after the prime minister, the two deputy prime ministers, and the premier of Sarawak.

== Rotation system: 1994–2004 ==
The rotation system was used in the state of Sabah as a means to divide and share power among the three main communities of the state—the Christian Bumiputras, the Muslim Bumiputras, and the Chinese people—represented by various political parties within the Barisan National coalition supposedly representing the interests of those communities. The system was introduced by the then Prime Minister of Malaysia Mahathir Mohamad when the ruling coalition party, Barisan Nasional, formed government despite losing in the 1994 state elections. This occurred due to defections which took place by elected representatives of Parti Bersatu Sabah (PBS), the party which won the election. Among the defectors were Bernard Dompok, who later became the chief minister himself and Joseph Kurup.

The system provided that the chief ministerial post will be held by a leader from one of the three communities for two years, and then the post will be passed on to another leader representing another community. The first chief minister under this system was Sakaran Dandai from the party United Malays National Organisation (UMNO) in 1994. Sakaran did not complete his two-year tenure and was replaced by Salleh Said Keruak, also from UMNO. In 1996, Yong Teck Lee from Sabah Progressive Party (SAPP) became next chief minister. Bernard Dompok then became the next chief minister representing the Christian Bumiputra community in 1998. His tenure lasted until 1999.

== Appointment ==
Source: Constitution of the State of Sabah
According to the state constitution, the Yang di-Pertua Negeri of Sabah shall first appoint the chief minister to preside over the Cabinet and requires such chief minister to be a member of the Legislative Assembly who in his judgment is likely to command the confidence of the majority of the members of the Assembly and must not a Malaysian citizen by naturalisation or by registration. The Yang di-Pertua Negeri on the chief minister's advice shall appoint not more than ten nor less than four Ministers from among the members of the Legislative Assembly.

The chief minister and his cabinet ministers must take and subscribe in the presence of the Yang di-Pertua Negeri the oath of office and allegiance as well as the oath of secrecy before they can exercise the functions of office. The Cabinet shall be collectively responsible to the Legislative Assembly. The members of the Cabinet shall not hold any office of profit and engage in any trade, business or profession that will cause conflict of interest.

If a government cannot get its appropriation (budget) legislation passed by the Legislative Assembly, or the Legislative Assembly passes a vote of "no confidence" in the government, the chief minister is bound by convention to resign immediately. The Yang di-Pertua Negeri's choice of replacement chief minister will be dictated by the circumstances. Ministers other than the chief minister shall hold office during the pleasure of the Yang di-Pertua Negeri, unless the appointment of any Minister shall have been revoked by the Yang di-Pertua Negeri on the advice of the chief minister but may at any time resign his office.

Following a resignation in other circumstances, defeated in an election or the death of a chief minister, the Yang di-Pertua Negeri will generally appoint as chief minister the person voted by the governing party as their new leader.

== Powers ==
The power of the chief minister is subject to a number of limitations. Chief ministers removed as leader of his or her party, or whose government loses a vote of no confidence in the Legislative Assembly, must advise a state election or resign the office or be dismissed by the Yang di-Pertua Negeri. The defeat of a supply bill (one that concerns the spending of money) or unable to pass important policy-related legislation is seen to require the resignation of the government or dissolution of Legislative Assembly, much like a non-confidence vote, since a government that cannot spend money is hamstrung, also called loss of supply.

The chief minister's party will normally have a majority in the Legislative Assembly and party discipline is exceptionally strong in Sabahan politics, so passage of the government's legislation through the Legislative Assembly is mostly a formality.

== Caretaker chief minister ==
The legislative assembly unless sooner dissolved by the Yang di-Pertua Negeri with His Excellency's own discretion on the advice of the chief minister shall continue for five years from the date of its first meeting. The state constitution permits a delay of 90 days of general election to be held from the date of dissolution and the legislative assembly shall be summoned to meet on a date not later than 120 days from the date of dissolution. Conventionally, between the dissolution of one legislative assembly and the convening of the next, the chief minister and the cabinet remain in office in a caretaker capacity.

== List of chief ministers of Sabah ==
The following is the list of chief ministers of Sabah since 1963:

Colour key (for political parties):
Sabah Alliance/BN BERJAYA PBS WARISAN (allied with Pakatan Harapan) GRS

No.	Portrait	Name (Birth–Death) Constituency	Term of office			Party (Note: This column names only the Chief Minister's party. The state government he heads may be a complex coalition of several parties and independents; those are not listed here.)	Election	Assembly
No.	Portrait	Name (Birth–Death) Constituency	Took office	Left office	Time in office	Party	Election	Assembly
1		Tun Datuk Seri Panglima Haji; Fuad Stephens (1920–1976)	16 September 1963	31 December 1964	1 year, 107 days	Sabah Alliance (UPKO)	–	1st
2		Tan Sri Datuk; Peter Lo Su Yin (1923–2020)	1 January 1965	12 May 1967	2 years, 132 days	Sabah Alliance (SCA)	–	2nd
3		Tun; Datu Mustapha Datu Harun (1918–1995); MLA for Bengkoka-Banggi	12 May 1967	1 November 1975	8 years, 174 days	Sabah Alliance (USNO)	1967	3rd
3		Tun; Datu Mustapha Datu Harun (1918–1995); MLA for Bengkoka-Banggi	12 May 1967	1 November 1975	8 years, 174 days	Sabah Alliance (USNO)	1971	4th
3		Tun; Datu Mustapha Datu Harun (1918–1995); MLA for Bengkoka-Banggi	12 May 1967	1 November 1975	8 years, 174 days	BN (USNO)	1971	4th
4		Tun; Mohammad Said Keruak (1925–1995); MLA for Usukan	1 November 1975	18 April 1976	170 days	BN (USNO)	–	4th
5		Tun Datuk Seri Panglima Haji; Fuad Stephens (1920–1976); MLA for Kiulu	18 April 1976	6 June 1976	50 days	BERJAYA	1976	5th
6		Tan Sri Datuk Seri Panglima; Harris Salleh (born 1930); MLA for Tenom	6 June 1976	22 April 1985	8 years, 321 days	BN (BERJAYA)	–	5th
6		Tan Sri Datuk Seri Panglima; Harris Salleh (born 1930); MLA for Tenom	6 June 1976	22 April 1985	8 years, 321 days	BN (BERJAYA)	1981	6th
7		Tan Sri Datuk Seri Panglima; Joseph Pairin Kitingan (born 1940); MLA for Tambunan	22 April 1985	17 March 1994	8 years, 330 days	PBS	1985	7th
7		Tan Sri Datuk Seri Panglima; Joseph Pairin Kitingan (born 1940); MLA for Tambunan	22 April 1985	17 March 1994	8 years, 330 days	BN (PBS)	1986	8th
7		Tan Sri Datuk Seri Panglima; Joseph Pairin Kitingan (born 1940); MLA for Tambunan	22 April 1985	17 March 1994	8 years, 330 days	GR (PBS)	1990	9th
7		Tan Sri Datuk Seri Panglima; Joseph Pairin Kitingan (born 1940); MLA for Tambunan	22 April 1985	17 March 1994	8 years, 330 days	GR (PBS)	1994	10th
8		Tun Datuk Seri Panglima; Sakaran Dandai (1930–2021); MLA for Sulabayan	17 March 1994	27 December 1994	286 days	BN (UMNO)	–	10th
9		Datuk Seri Panglima; Salleh Said Keruak (born 1957); MLA for Usukan	27 December 1994	28 May 1996	1 year, 154 days	BN (UMNO)	–	10th
10		Datuk Seri Panglima; Yong Teck Lee (born 1958); MLA for Likas	28 May 1996	28 May 1998	2 years, 1 day	BN (SAPP)	–	10th
11		Tan Sri Datuk Seri Panglima; Bernard Giluk Dompok (born 1949); MLA for Moyog	28 May 1998	14 March 1999	291 days	BN (PDS)	–	10th
12		Tan Sri Datuk Seri Panglima; Osu Sukam (born 1949); MLA for Kawang	14 March 1999	27 March 2001	2 years, 14 days	BN (UMNO)	1999	11th
13		Tan Sri Datuk Seri Panglima; Chong Kah Kiat (born 1948); MLA for Kudat	27 March 2001	27 March 2003	2 years, 1 day	BN (LDP)	–	11th
14		Tan Sri Datuk Seri Panglima; Musa Aman (Note: Musa stressed that he is still the Chief Minister despite his position has been disputed since 11 May 2018 in the aftermath of 2018 Sabah state election after losing majority seats following the crossover of Barisan Nasional (BN) party state seats members to Sabah Heritage Party (WARISAN). Article 7(1) of the Sabah State Constitution also expressly stipulates that if the Chief Minister ceases to command the confidence of a majority of the members of the Legislative Assembly, then, unless at his request the Head of State (TYT) dissolves the Assembly, the Chief Minister shall tender the resignation of the members of the Cabinet. In the present situation, WARISAN had more assemblymen than BN after six BN assemblymen agreed to join the WARISAN coalition. Hence, by virtue of the said Article 7(1), Musa has ceased to command the confidence of a majority of the members of the Legislative Assembly and should have tendered his resignation. Furthermore, according to Shafie, the TYT had requested for Musa to step down but still did not doing so. He was then issued a letter from the TYT that he is no longer the Chief Minister effective from 12 May 2018 that was delivered into his residence on 14 May 2018.) (born 1951); MLA for Sungai Sibuga	27 March 2003	12 May 2018	15 years, 47 days	BN (UMNO)	–	11th
14		Tan Sri Datuk Seri Panglima; Musa Aman (born 1951); MLA for Sungai Sibuga	27 March 2003	12 May 2018	15 years, 47 days	BN (UMNO)	2004	12th
14		Tan Sri Datuk Seri Panglima; Musa Aman (born 1951); MLA for Sungai Sibuga	27 March 2003	12 May 2018	15 years, 47 days	BN (UMNO)	2008	13th
14		Tan Sri Datuk Seri Panglima; Musa Aman (born 1951); MLA for Sungai Sibuga	27 March 2003	12 May 2018	15 years, 47 days	BN (UMNO)	2013	14th
14		Tan Sri Datuk Seri Panglima; Musa Aman (born 1951); MLA for Sungai Sibuga	27 March 2003	12 May 2018	15 years, 47 days	BN (UMNO)	2018	15th
15		Datuk Seri Panglima; Mohd Shafie Apdal (born 1957); MLA for Senallang	12 May 2018	29 September 2020	2 years, 141 days	WARISAN	–	15th
16		Datuk Seri Panglima Haji; Hajiji Noor (born 1955); MLA for Sulaman	29 September 2020	Incumbent	5 years, 344 days	GRS (BERSATU)	2020	16th
16		Datuk Seri Panglima Haji; Hajiji Noor (born 1955); MLA for Sulaman	29 September 2020	Incumbent	5 years, 344 days	GRS (GAGASAN)	2020	16th
16		Datuk Seri Panglima Haji; Hajiji Noor (born 1955); MLA for Sulaman	29 September 2020	Incumbent	5 years, 344 days	GRS (GAGASAN)	2025	17th

== See also ==
- Governor of North Borneo
