= West Coast Division =

Administrative division in Sabah, Malaysia

Coordinates: 6°05′N 116°30′E

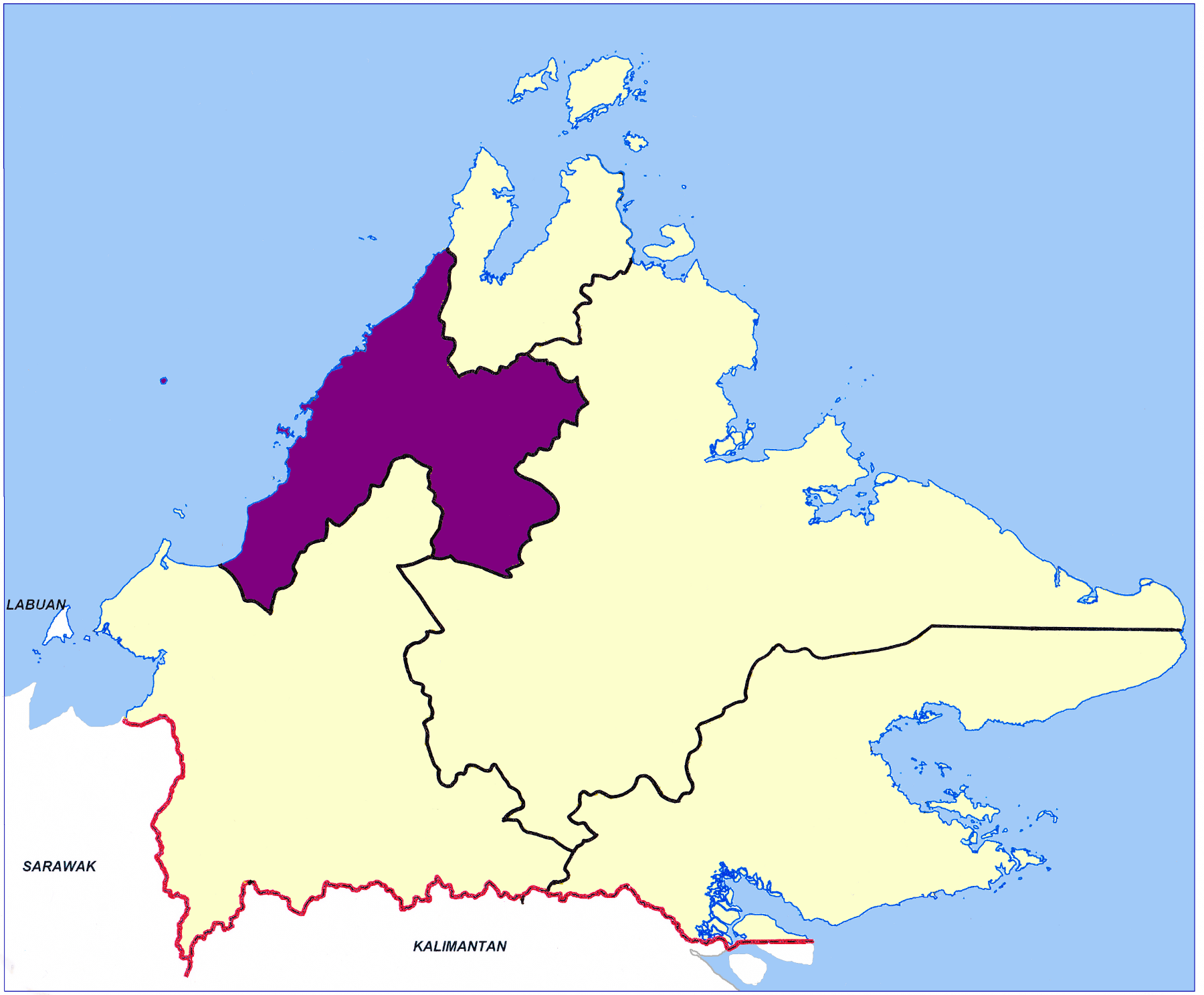
Location map of the West Coast Division.

West Coast Division (Malay: Bahagian Pantai Barat) is an administrative division of Sabah, Malaysia. It occupies the northwest portion of Sabah. With an area of 7,588 square kilometres, it occupies 10.3% of Sabah's territory. It also has approximately 30% of Sabah's total population, with the main indigenous inhabitants comprising the Bajau, Bisaya, Bruneian Malay, Dusun, Illanun, Kadazan and Kedayan, as well with a significant numbers of Chinese. The division is divided into the districts of Ranau, Kota Belud, Tuaran, Penampang, Papar, Putatan and the state capital Kota Kinabalu. The main towns are as in the names of the districts, plus other towns including Petagas, Lok Kawi, Menggatal, Inanam, Telipok, Tamparuli, Tenghilan, Kiulu, Kundasang, Pekan Nabalu, Kinarut, Kimanis and Bongawan.

Kota Kinabalu Harbour is the main sea ports in the state's capital with an estimate size of 1,440 kilometres long coast. It serves as the gateway for water transport in Sabah. It handles and handles 4,031,000 freight tonne annually. The Kota Kinabalu International Airport serves as the main gateway into the state by air.

== Districts ==
West Coast Division is subdivided into the following administrative districts:

- Kota Belud District (1,386 km^{2}) (Kota Belud Town)
- Kota Kinabalu District (350 km^{2}) (Kota Kinabalu City)
- Papar District (1,234 km^{2}) (Papar Town)
- Penampang District (466 km^{2}) (Penampang Town)
- Putatan District (29,7 km^{2}) (Putatan Town) – recently established in 2007
- Ranau District (2,978 km^{2}) (Ranau Town)
- Tuaran District (1,165 km^{2}) (Tuaran Town)

== Constituencies ==
West Coast division is divided into eight federal constituencies and 25 state constituencies:

Parliament			Legislative Assembly		
Constituency	MPs (2022)	Party	Constituency	MLAs (2020)	Party
P169 Kota Belud	Isnaraissah Munirah Majilis	WARISAN	N08 Pintasan	Fairuz Renddan	GRS (GAGASAN)
P169 Kota Belud	Isnaraissah Munirah Majilis	WARISAN	N09 Tempasuk	Mohd Arsad Bistari	GRS (GAGASAN)
P169 Kota Belud	Isnaraissah Munirah Majilis	WARISAN	N10 Usukan	Salleh Said Keruak	BN (UMNO)
P169 Kota Belud	Isnaraissah Munirah Majilis	WARISAN	N11 Kedamaian	Ewon Benedick	PH (UPKO)
P170 Tuaran	Wilfred Madius Tangau	PH (UPKO)	N12 Sulaman	Hajiji Noor	GRS (GAGASAN)
P170 Tuaran	Wilfred Madius Tangau	PH (UPKO)	N13 Pantai Dalit	Jasnih Daya	GRS (GAGASAN)
P170 Tuaran	Wilfred Madius Tangau	PH (UPKO)	N14 Tamparuli	Jahid Jahim	GRS (PBS)
P170 Tuaran	Wilfred Madius Tangau	PH (UPKO)	N15 Kiulu	Joniston Bangkuai	GRS (PBS)
P171 Sepanggar	Mustapha Sakmud	PH (PKR)	N16 Karambunai	Yakubah Khan	BN (UMNO)
P171 Sepanggar	Mustapha Sakmud	PH (PKR)	N17 Darau	Azhar Matussin	WARISAN
P171 Sepanggar	Mustapha Sakmud	PH (PKR)	N18 Inanam	Peto Galim	PH (PKR)
P172 Kota Kinabalu	Chan Foong Hin	PH (DAP)	N19 Likas	Tan Lee Fatt	PH (DAP)
P172 Kota Kinabalu	Chan Foong Hin	PH (DAP)	N20 Api-Api	Christina Liew Chin Jin	PH (PKR)
P172 Kota Kinabalu	Chan Foong Hin	PH (DAP)	N21 Luyang	Phoong Jin Zhe	PH (DAP)
P173 Putatan	Shahelmey Yahya	BN (UMNO)	N22 Tanjung Aru	Junz Wong	WARISAN
P173 Putatan	Shahelmey Yahya	BN (UMNO)	N23 Petagas	Awang Ahmad Sah Awang Sahari	GRS (GAGASAN)
P173 Putatan	Shahelmey Yahya	BN (UMNO)	N24 Tanjong Keramat	Shahelmey Yahya	BN (UMNO)
P174 Penampang	Ewon Benedick	PH (UPKO)	N25 Kapayan	Jannie Lasimbang	PH (DAP)
P174 Penampang	Ewon Benedick	PH (UPKO)	N26 Moyog	Darell Leiking	WARISAN
P175 Papar	Armizan Mohd Ali	GRS	N27 Limbahau	Juil Nuatim	GRS
P175 Papar	Armizan Mohd Ali	GRS	N28 Kawang	Gulamhaidar @ Yusof Khan Bahadar	GRS (GAGASAN)
P175 Papar	Armizan Mohd Ali	GRS	N29 Pantai Manis	Mohd Tamin Zainal	BN (UMNO)
P179 Ranau	Jonathan Yasin	GRS	N36 Kundasang	Joachim Gunsalam	GRS (PBS)
P179 Ranau	Jonathan Yasin	GRS	N37 Karanaan	Masidi Manjun	GRS (GAGASAN)
P179 Ranau	Jonathan Yasin	GRS	N38 Paginatan	Abidin Madingkir	STAR

== History ==
The present divisions of Sabah is largely inherited from the division of the North Borneo Chartered Company. Following the acquisition of North Borneo under the royal charter issued in 1881, the administrative division introduced by Baron von Overbeck was continued by the establishment of two residences comprising West Coast Residency and East Coast Residency. Seat of the two residents was in Sandakan, where the governor was based. Each resident, in turn, was divided into several provinces managed by a district officer. (Note: The original position was initially Magistrates-in-charge.)

As North Borneo progresses, the number of residencies has increased to five including: Tawau Residency (also known as East Coast Residency), Sandakan Residency, West Coast Residency, Kudat Residency, and Interior Residency; the provinces were initially named after the members of the board: Alcock, Cunlife, Dewhurst, Keppel, Dent, Martin, Elphinstone, Myburgh and Mayne. The senior residents occupied Sandakan and the West Coast, while the other three resident with the second class residencies occupied Interior, East Coast and Kudat. The residents of Sandakan and West Coast were members of the Legislative Council, the Legislative Assembly of the company.

The division into residencies was maintained when North Borneo became a Crown Colony after World War II. On 16 September 1963, with the formation of Malaysia, North Borneo which subsequently became the state of Sabah took over the administrative structure through the Ordinance on Administrative Units. At the same time, the Yang di-Pertua Negeri, the head of state of Sabah, was authorised by proclamation to divide the state into divisions and districts. (Note: The most recent such proclamation dates from 2009: Administrative Divisions Proclamation 2009.) The abolition of the residency term was in favour of the division term that took place in 1976.

Today, the division has only formal significance and no longer constitutes its own administrative level. The resident's post was also abolished, as Sabah's municipal administration is in the hands of the district officers.

== See also ==
- Divisions of Malaysia

== Literature ==
- Tregonning, K. G. (1965). A History Of Modern Sabah (North Borneo 1881–1963). University of Malaya Press.
