= Kota Belud District =

Kota Belud District Daerah Kota Belud
- District
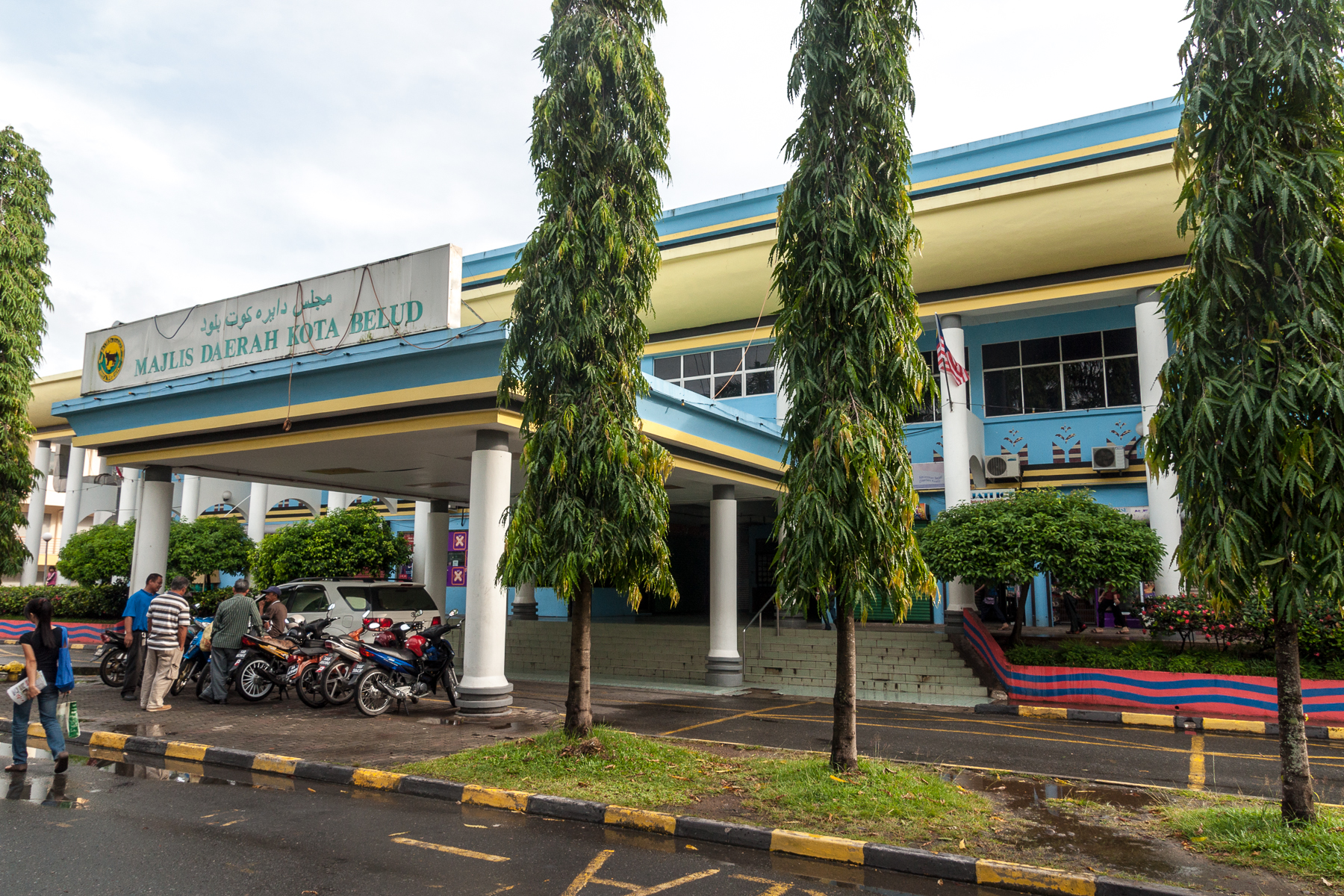
- Kota Belud District Council office.

- Seal

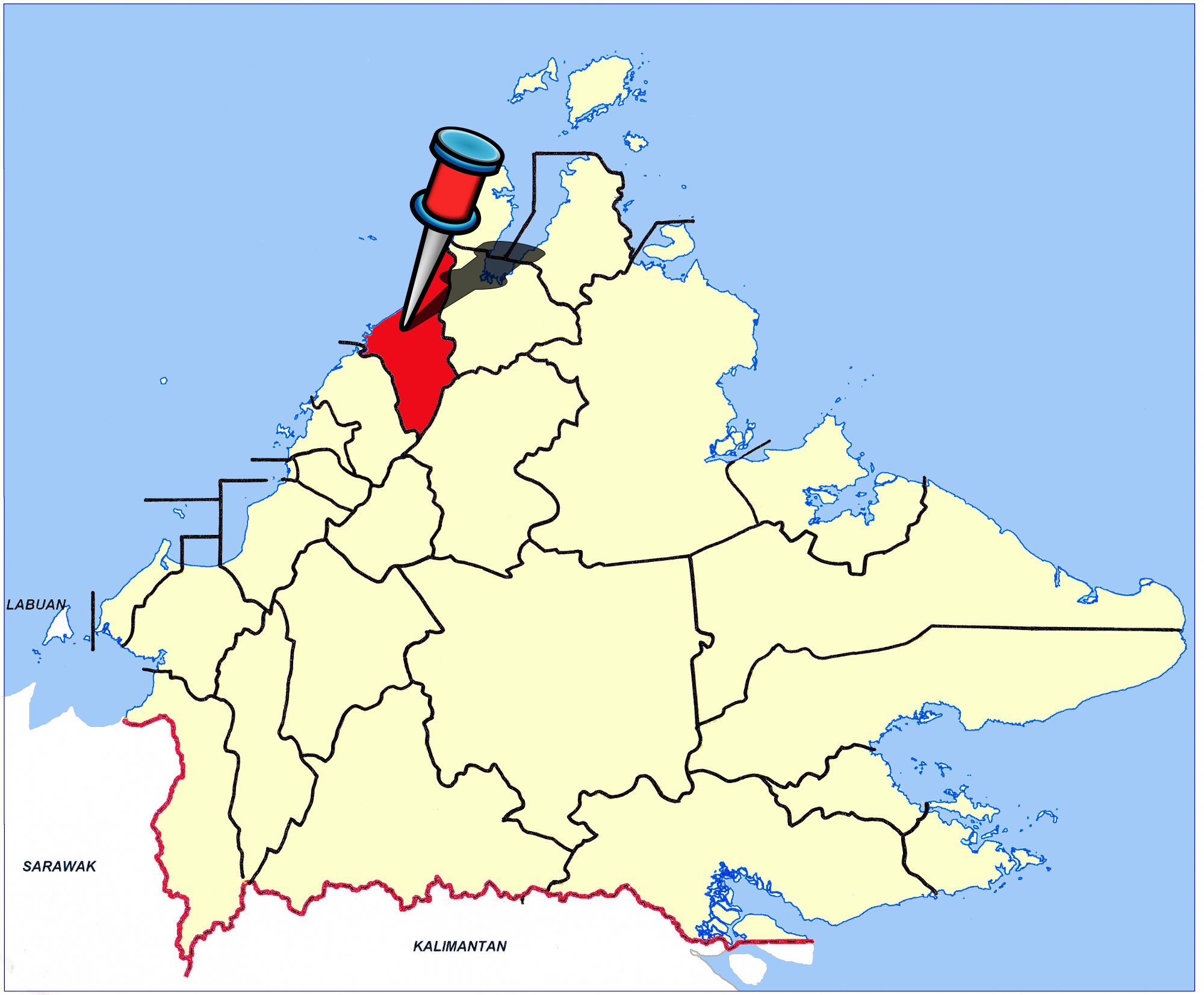

- Coordinates: 6°21′00″N 116°26′00″E
- Country: Malaysia
- State: Sabah
- Division: West Coast
- Capital: Kota Belud

Government
  - District Officer: Peter Jiton

Area
  - Total: 1,386 km^{2} (535 sq mi)

Population (2010)
  - Total: 91,272
- Website: mdkotabelud.sbh.gov.my pdkotabelud.sbh.gov.my

The Kota Belud District (Malay: Daerah Kota Belud) is an administrative district in the Malaysian state of Sabah, part of the West Coast Division which includes the districts of Kota Belud, Kota Kinabalu, Papar, Penampang, Putatan, Ranau and Tuaran. The capital of the district is in Kota Belud Town. Kota Belud has tripoint bordered economic town named Pekan Nabalu.

== Etymology ==
Kota Belud gained its name from the combination of two words in Bajau language. Kota means "fort" while Belud means a "hill" which consequently giving the meaning of "fort in a hill".

== History ==
In the past before the existence of a government body, there was often hostility between the races of different villages in the area. In order to defending themselves, they had to find a place to survive their opposition attacks. Hence, the Bajaus have chosen a hill as their fortress which subsequently known as "Kota Belud".

== Demographics ==
According to the last census in 2010, the population of Kota Belud district is estimated to be around 91,27, mainly Bajau (including Illanun) people and also Dusun (Tindal and Tobilung tribes). As in other districts of Sabah, there are a significant number of illegal immigrants from the nearby southern Philippines, mainly from the Sulu Archipelago and Mindanao, many of whom are not included in the population statistics.

== Mukim in Kota Belud District ==
1. Mukim Ambong
2. Mukim Bandar Kota Belud
3. Mukim Dudar
4. Mukim Kaguraan
5. Mukim Nabalu
6. Mukim Kadamaian
7. Mukim Kebayau
8. Mukim Kedatuan
9. Mukim Kelawat
10. Mukim Kulambai
11. Mukim Kinasaraban
12. Mukim Lasau
13. Mukim Mangkulat
14. Mukim Pirasan
15. Mukim Rampayan
16. Mukim Rosok
17. Mukim Sembirai
18. Mukim Taginambur
19. Mukim Taun Gusi
20. Mukim Tempasuk

== Notable Personalities ==
=== Politicians ===
- Mohammad Said Keruak – the seventh Head of State of Sabah and the fourth Chief Minister of Sabah
- Fairuz Renddan – current state cabinet assistant minister and member of the state legislative assembly for Pintasan
- Salleh Said Keruak – the ninth Chief Minister of Sabah from 1994 to 1996, former Speaker of the Sabah State Legislative Assembly from 2010 to 2015, former Senator cum Malaysian Minister of Communications and Multimedia from 2015 to 2018 and former member of parliament from 1995 to 2008
- Mohd Arsad Bistari – current state assemblyman for Tempasuk since 2020
- Pandikar Amin Mulia – the eighth Speaker of the Dewan Rakyat, the lower house of Parliament of Malaysia and former state assemblyman for Tempasuk from 1994 to 1999 and again from 2004 to 2008
- Mustapha Sakmud – current member of parliament for Sepanggar
- Japlin Akim – former state assemblyman for Usukan from 2004 to 2013 and again from 2018 to 2020
- Musbah Jamli – former state assemblyman for Tempasuk from 2008 to 2020
- Ewon Benedick – current member of parliament for Penampang (maternal hometown)
- Isnaraissah Munirah Majilis – incumbent member of parliament since 2018
- Liew Vui Keong – former member of parliament for Sandakan as well as Batu Sapi constituencies from 2008 to 2013 and from 2018 to 2020

=== Sportspeople ===
- Dass Gregory Kalopis – former Malaysian football player
- Matlan Marjan – former Malaysian football player
- Zainizam Marjan – former Malaysian football player

=== Singers/Musicians ===
- Gary Chaw – The only Malaysian who became the winner of the 19th Golden Melody Awards 'Best Male Mandarin Singer', one of the most prestigious award in the Chinese music industry

== Gallery ==
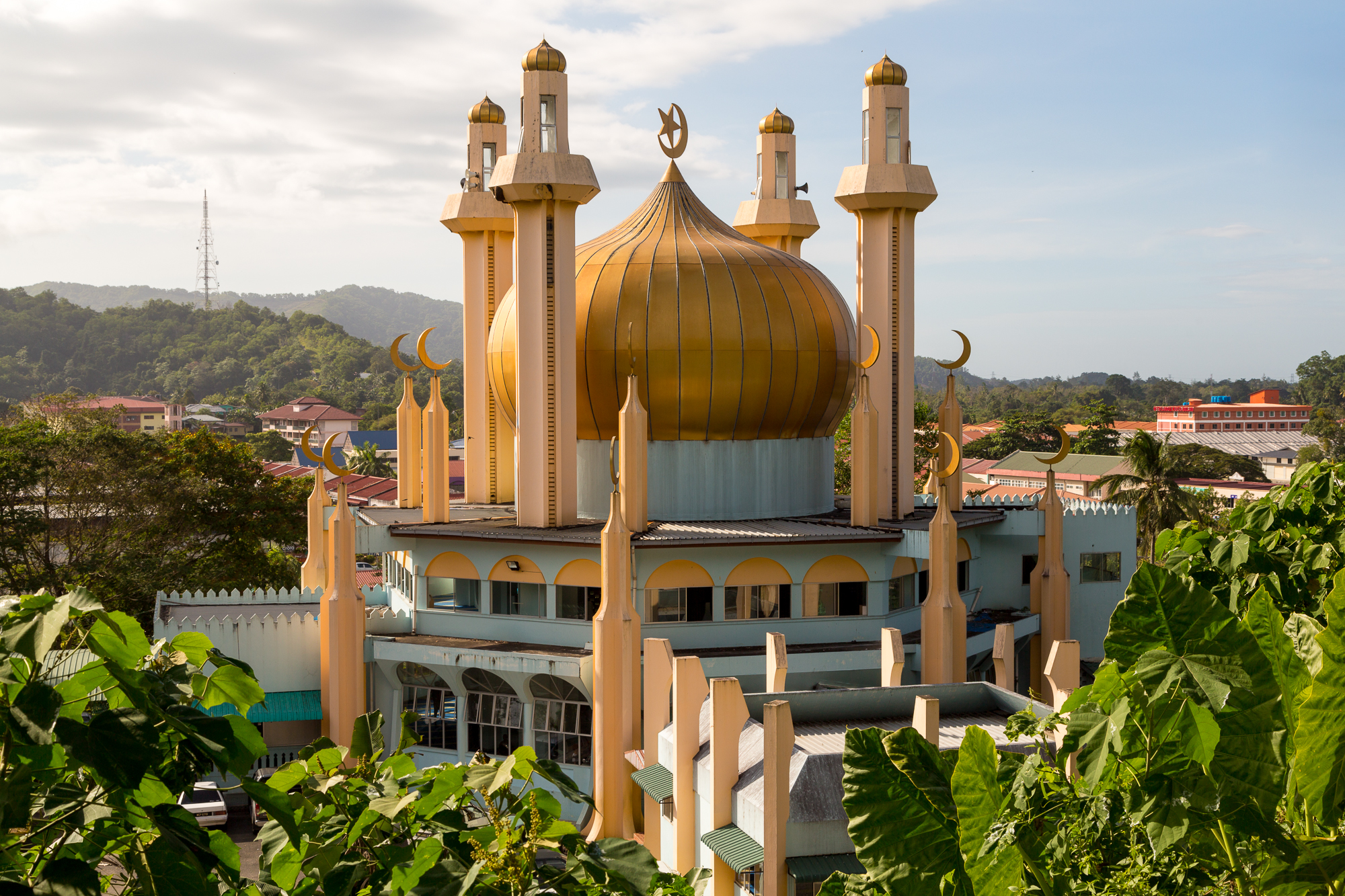
Kota Belud Mosque.

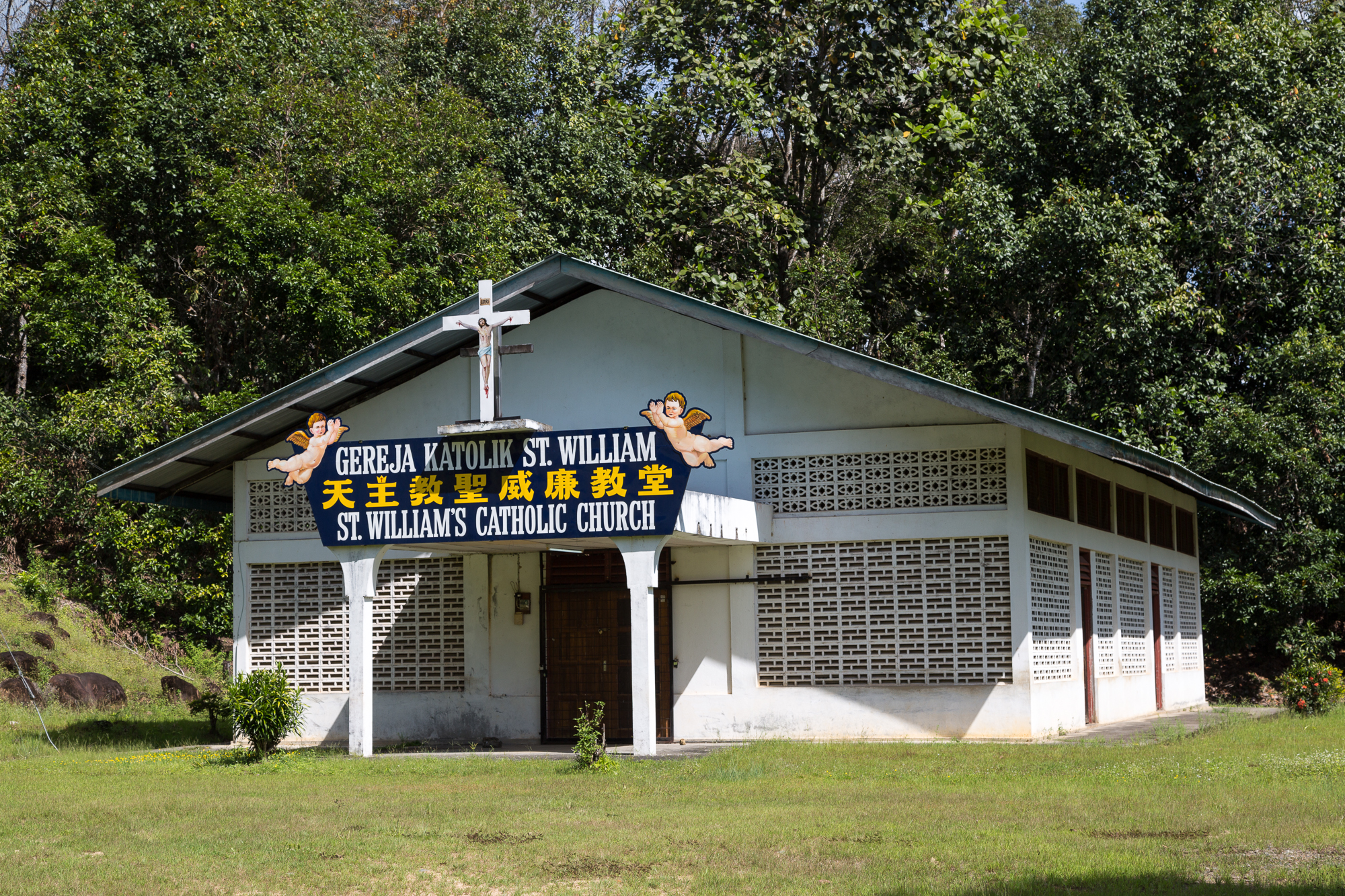
St. William Catholic Church.

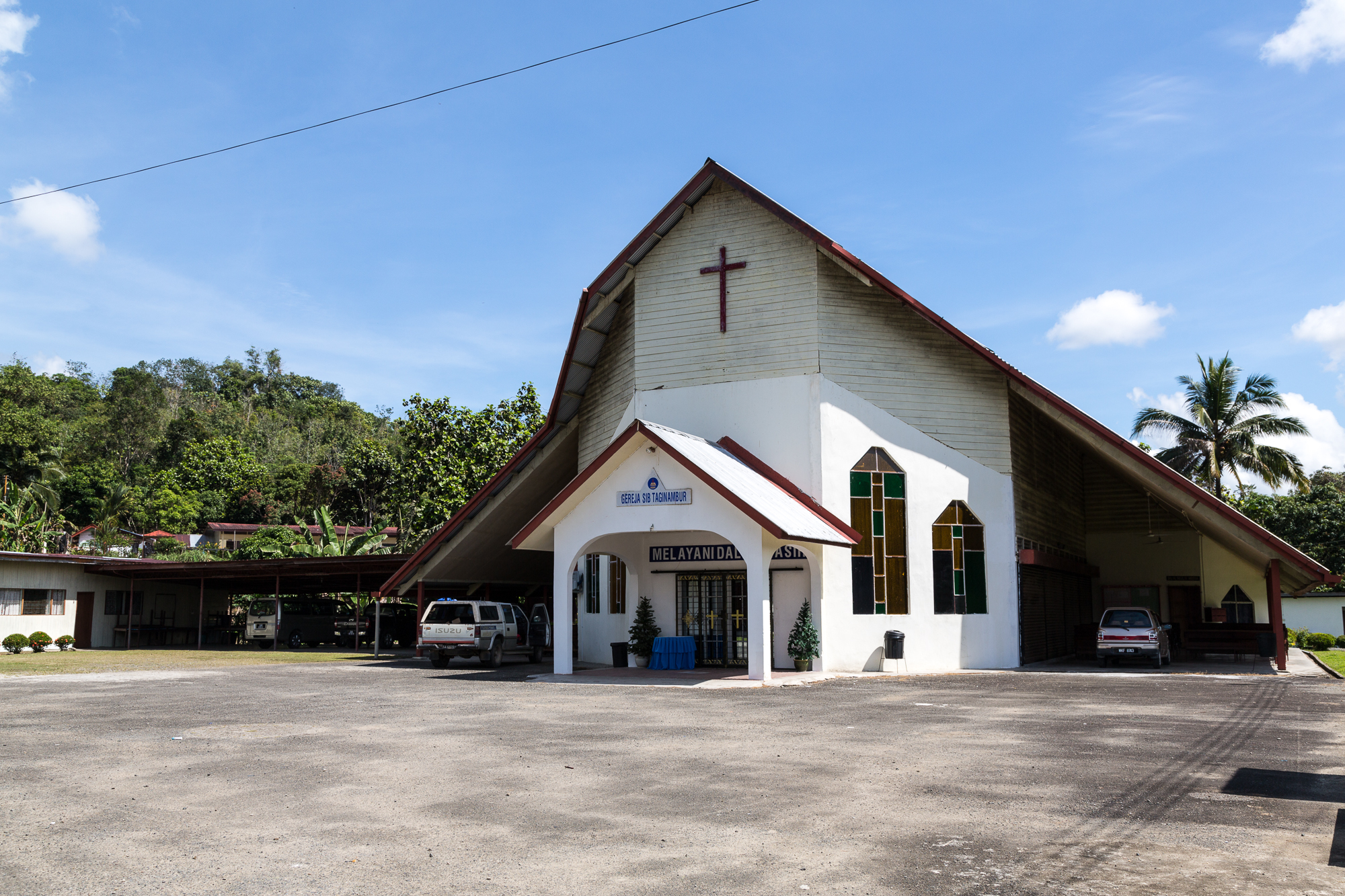
Taginambur Borneo Evangelical Church.

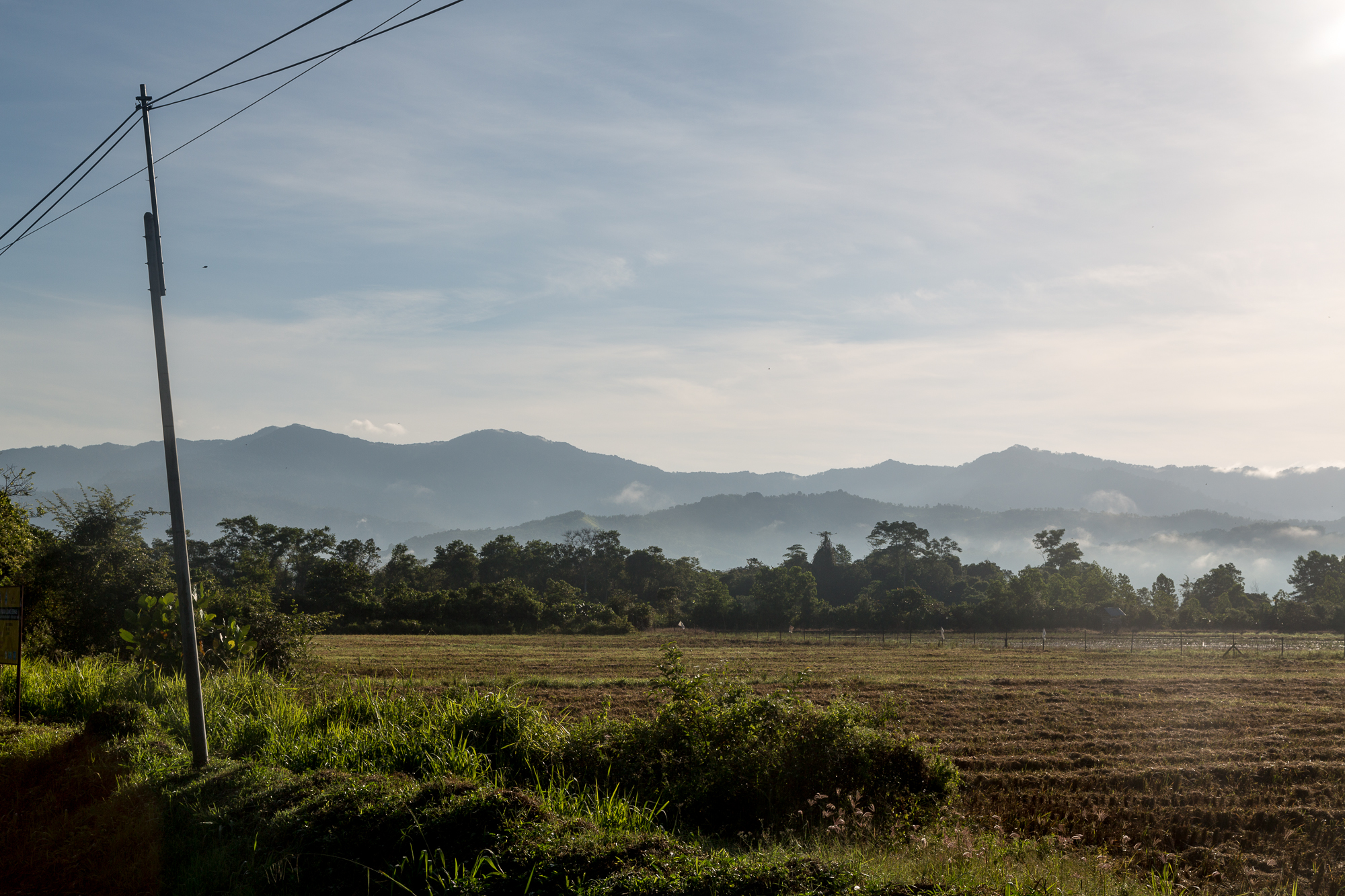
James Brooke Range.

== See also ==
- Districts of Malaysia
