= Kota Belud (federal constituency) =

Federal constituency of Sabah, Malaysia

Kota Belud (P169)
Sabah constituency

Federal constituency
- Legislature: Dewan Rakyat
- MP: Isnaraissah Munirah Majilis; Heritage
- Constituency created: 1966
- First contested: 1969
- Last contested: 2022

Demographics
- Population (2020): 107,243
- Electors (2025): 83,487
- Area (km²): 1,372
- Pop. density (per km²): 78.2

Kota Belud is a federal constituency in West Coast Division (Kota Belud District), Sabah, Malaysia, that has been represented in the Dewan Rakyat since 1971.

The federal constituency was created in the 1966 redistribution and is mandated to return a single member to the Dewan Rakyat under the first past the post voting system.

== Demographics ==
https://ge15.orientaldaily.com.my/seats/sabah/p

Ethnic breakdown of Kota Belud's electorate as of 2022
1. Sabah Bumiputera (79.2%)
2. Malay-Muslim Bumiputera (15.6%)
3. Chinese (2.60%)
4. Other ethnicities (2.40%)

As of 2020, Kota Belud has a population of 107,243 people.

Age breakdown of Kota Belud's electorate as of 2022
1. 18-20 (7.13%)
2. 21-29 (22.2%)
3. 30-39 (23.9%)
4. 40-49 (17.1%)
5. 50-59 (13.5%)
6. 60-69 (9.25%)
7. 70-79 (3.86%)
8. 80-89 (2.07%)
9. above 90 (1.04%)
Gender breakdown of Kota Belud's electorate as of 2022
1. Male (48.9%)
2. Female (51.1%)

== History ==
=== Polling districts ===
According to the gazette issued on 21 November 2025, the Kota Belud constituency has a total of 44 polling districts.

State constituency	Polling Districts	Code	Location
Pintasan（N08）	Dudar	169/08/01	SK Dudar
Pintasan（N08）	Rampayan	169/08/02	SK Nanamun
Pintasan（N08）	Timbang	169/08/03	SK Timbang
Pintasan（N08）	Tamau	169/08/04	SK Tamau
Pintasan（N08）	Merbau	169/08/05	SA Negeri Merabau Kota Belud
Pintasan（N08）	Pandasan	169/08/06	SK Pandasan
Pintasan（N08）	Kota Peladok	169/08/07	Dewan Serba Guna Kota Peladok
Pintasan（N08）	Rampayan Ulu	169/08/08	SK Rampayan Ulu
Pintasan（N08）	Pulau Mantani	169/08/09	SK Pulau Mantanani
Pintasan（N08）	Peladok	169/08/10	SK Peladok
Tempasuk (N09)	Kagurahan	169/09/01	SK Keguraan
Tempasuk (N09)	Taun Gusi	169/09/02	SK Taun Gusi
Tempasuk (N09)	Tempasuk	169/09/03	SK Tempasuk II
Tempasuk (N09)	Rosok	169/09/04	SK Rosok / Bengkahak Lama
Tempasuk (N09)	Gunding	169/09/05	SK Tampasuk I
Tempasuk (N09)	Jawi Jawi	169/09/06	SK Jawi-Jawi
Tempasuk (N09)	Labuan	169/09/07	SK Labuan
Usukan（N10）	Ambong	169/10/01	SK Ambong
Usukan（N10）	Kulambai	169/10/02	SK Kulambai
Usukan（N10）	Timbang Dayang	169/10/03	SK Timbang Dayang
Usukan（N10）	Sambirai	169/10/04	SK Sembirai
Usukan（N10）	Pangkalan Abai	169/10/05	SK Pangkalan Abai
Usukan（N10）	Pompod	169/10/06	SJK (C) Chung Hwa
Usukan（N10）	Kota Belud	169/10/07	SMK Pekan Kota Belud
Usukan（N10）	Pirasan	169/10/08	SMK Arshad
Usukan（N10）	Suang Punggor	169/10/09	SK Suang Punggor
Usukan（N10）	Kuala Abai	169/10/10	SK Kuala Abai
Usukan（N10）	Siasai	169/10/11	SK St Edmund
Kadamaian (N11)	Kelawat	169/11/01	SK Kelawat
Kadamaian (N11)	Kinasaraban	169/11/02	SK Kinasaraban Kota Belud
Kadamaian (N11)	Tamu Darat	169/11/03	SK Tamu Darat
Kadamaian (N11)	Piasau	169/11/04	SK Piasau
Kadamaian (N11)	Tangkurus	169/11/05	SK Tengkurus
Kadamaian (N11)	Lasau	169/11/06	SK Lasau Podi
Kadamaian (N11)	Sayap	169/11/07	SK Sayap
Kadamaian (N11)	Taginambur	169/11/08	SMK Narinang
Kadamaian (N11)	Narinang	169/11/09	SK Narinang
Kadamaian (N11)	Kebayau	169/11/10	SK Kebayau
Kadamaian (N11)	Kiau	169/11/11	SK Kiau 1
Kadamaian (N11)	Gaur-Gaur	169/11/12	SK Mengkulat
Kadamaian (N11)	Tambulian	169/11/13	SK Tambulian
Kadamaian (N11)	Nahaba	169/11/14	SK Nahaba
Kadamaian (N11)	Melangkap	169/11/15	SK Melangkap Kota Belud
Kadamaian (N11)	Kaung	169/11/16	SK Kaung

=== Representation history ===
Members of Parliament for Kota Belud
Parliament	No	Years	Member	Party	Vote Share
Constituency created
		1969-1971	Parliament was suspended		
3rd	P107	1971-1973	Mohammad Said Keruak (محمّد سعيد کرواق)	USNO	9,290; 79.95%
3rd	P107	1973-1974	Mohammad Said Keruak (محمّد سعيد کرواق)	BN (USNO)	9,290; 79.95%
4th	P117	1974-1978	Mohammad Said Keruak (محمّد سعيد کرواق)	BN (USNO)	Uncontested
5th	P117	1978-1982	Mohammad Said Keruak (محمّد سعيد کرواق)	BN (USNO)	6,737; 47.76%
6th	P117	1982-1986	Mohammad Yahya Lampong (محمّد يحيى لمڤوڠ)	Independent	9,952; 58.68%
7th	P136	1986-1990	Maidom Pansai @ Paul Pansai	BN (PBS)	8,155; 49.75%
8th	P136	1990-1995	Maidom Pansai @ Paul Pansai	GR (PBS)	11,501; 54.38%
9th	P148	1995-1999	Md Salleh Md Said (مد صالح مد سعيد)	BN (UMNO)	17,368; 62.92%
10th	P148	1999-2004	Md Salleh Md Said (مد صالح مد سعيد)	BN (UMNO)	17,817; 62.16%
11th	P169	2004-2008	Md Salleh Md Said (مد صالح مد سعيد)	BN (UMNO)	19,290; 64.93%
12th	P169	2008-2013	Abdul Rahman Dahlan (عبدالرحمٰن دحلان)	BN (UMNO)	17,842; 54.62%
13th	P169	2013-2018	Abdul Rahman Dahlan (عبدالرحمٰن دحلان)	BN (UMNO)	21,768; 51.44%
14th	P169	2018–2022	Isnaraissah Munirah Majilis (اغثنا الرئيسة منيرة مجليس)	WARISAN	23,429; 50.82%
15th	P169	2022–present	Isnaraissah Munirah Majilis (اغثنا الرئيسة منيرة مجليس)	WARISAN	25,148; 46.54%

=== State constituency ===
Parliamentary constituency	State constituency					
Parliamentary constituency	1967–1974	1974–1985	1985–1995	1995–2004	2004–2020	2020–present
Kota Belud			Kadamaian			
Kota Belud		Kebuyau				
Kota Belud	Sorob					
Kota Belud		Tempasuk				
Kota Belud	Usukan					
Kota Belud						Pintasan

=== Historical boundaries ===
State Constituency	Area					
State Constituency	1966	1974	1984	1994	2003	2019
Kadamaian			Kadamaian; Kampung Siasai; Kiau; Rangaualu; Taginambur	Kadamaian; Kelawat; Kiau; Rangalau; Taginambur		
Kebuyau		Kadamaian; Kampung Siasai; Kiau; Rangaualu; Taginambur				
Sorob	Kadamaian; Kampung Rosok; Taginambur; Taun Gusi; Tempasuk					
Tempasuk		Kampung Gonok; Kampung Tamau; Pintasan; Taun Gusi; Tempasuk		Kampung Dudar; Kampung Tamau; Pintasan; Taun Gusi; Tempasuk		Jawi-Jawi; Kampung Keguraan; Kampung Rosok; Taun Gusi; Tempasuk
Usukan	Kampung Kelawat; Kota Belud; Peladok; Pulau Mantani; Usukan			Kampung Pirasan; Kota Belud; Peladok; Pulau Mantani; Usukan		Kampung Ampong; Kampung Kelawat; Kampung Pirasan; Kota Belud; Usukan
Pintasan						Kampung Dudar; Kampung Nanamun; Kampun Tamau; Peladok; Pulau Mantani

=== Current state assembly members ===
No.	State Constituency	Member	Coalition (Party)
N08	Pintasan	Fairuz Renddan	IND
N09	Tempasuk	Mohd Arsad Bistari	GRS (GAGASAN)
N10	Usukan	Isnaraissah Munirah Majilis	WARISAN
N11	Kadamaian	Ewon Benedick	GRS (UPKO)

=== Local governments & postcodes ===
No	State Constituency	Local Government	Postcode
N08	Pintasan	Kota Belud District Council	89150 Kota Belud
N09	Tempasuk	Kota Belud District Council	89150 Kota Belud
N10	Usukan	Kota Belud District Council	89150 Kota Belud
N11	Kadamaian	Kota Belud District Council	89150 Kota Belud

== Election results ==
Malaysian general election, 2022
Party	Candidate	Votes	%	∆%
Heritage	Isnaraissah Munirah Majilis	25,148	46.54	▼4.28
BN	Abdul Rahman Dahlan	20,566	38.06	▼3.52
PH	Madeli @ Modily bin Bangali	8,323	15.40	▲15.40
Total valid votes		54,037	100.00	
Total rejected ballots		749		
Unreturned ballots		486		
Turnout		55,272	67.64	▼14.48
Registered electors		79,885		
Majority		4,582	8.48	▼0.77
Heritage hold		Swing		
Source(s) https://lom.agc.gov.my/ilims/upload/portal/akta/outputp/1753262/PUB619_2022.pdf

Malaysian general election, 2018
Party	Candidate	Votes	%	∆%
Sabah Heritage Party	Isnaraissah Munirah Majilis	23,429	50.82	▲50.82
BN	Md Salleh Md Said	19,167	41.58	▼10.12
Sabah People's Hope Party	Miasin @ Aimaduddin Mion	2,092	4.54	▲4.54
PAS	Laiman Ikin @ Ag Laiman B Kakimin	1,410	3.06	▲3.06
Total valid votes		46,098	100.00	
Total rejected ballots		1,173		
Unreturned ballots		294		
Turnout		47,565	82.12	▼2.40
Registered electors		57,919		
Majority		4,262	9.25	▼2.79
Sabah Heritage Party gain from BN		Swing		?
Source(s) "His Majesty's Government Gazette - Notice of Contested Election, Parliament for the State of Sabah [P.U. (B) 246/2018]" (PDF). Attorney General's Chambers of Malaysia. 3 May 2018. "Federal Government Gazette - Results of Contested Election and Statements of the Poll after the Official Addition of Votes, Parliamentary Constituencies for the State of Sabah [P.U. (B) 320/2018]" (PDF). Attorney General's Chambers of Malaysia. 28 May 2018. Archived from the original (PDF) on 2019-12-29.

Malaysian general election, 2013
Party	Candidate	Votes	%	∆%
BN	Abdul Rahman Dahlan	21,768	51.44	▼3.18
PKR	Isnaraissah Munirah Majilis @ Fakharudy	16,673	39.40	▼5.98
STAR	Jalumin Bayogoh	2,709	6.40	▲6.40
Independent	Lamsil Amidsor	979	2.31	▲2.31
Independent	Kanul Gindol	185	0.44	▲0.44
Total valid votes		42,314	100.00	
Total rejected ballots		1,109		
Unreturned ballots		79		
Turnout		43,502	84.52	▲6.25
Registered electors		51,467		
Majority		5,095	12.04	▲2.80
BN hold		Swing		
Source(s) "Federal Government Gazette - Notice of Contested Election, Parliament for the State of Sabah [P.U. (B) 183/2013]" (PDF). Attorney General's Chambers of Malaysia. 26 April 2013. Archived from the original (PDF) on 2018-09-30. "Federal Government Gazette - Results of Contested Election and Statements of the Poll after the Official Addition of Votes, Parliamentary Constituencies for the State of Sabah [P.U. (B) 224/2013]" (PDF). Attorney General's Chambers of Malaysia. 22 May 2013. Archived from the original (PDF) on 2018-09-30.

Malaysian general election, 2008
Party	Candidate	Votes	%	∆%
BN	Abdul Rahman Dahlan	17,842	54.62	▼10.31
PKR	Saidil @ Saidi Simoi	14,822	45.38	▲45.38
Total valid votes		32,664	100.00	
Total rejected ballots		1,046		
Unreturned ballots		0		
Turnout		33,710	78.27	▲3.07
Registered electors		43,071		
Majority		3,020	9.24	▼25.84
BN hold		Swing		

Malaysian general election, 2004
Party	Candidate	Votes	%	∆%
BN	Md Salleh Md Said	19,290	64.93	▲2.77
Independent	James Baga @ Bagah	8,869	29.85	▲29.85
SETIA	Jaimin @ Jack Giau	1,551	5.22	▲5.22
Total valid votes		29,710	100.00	
Total rejected ballots		1,084		
Unreturned ballots		87		
Turnout		30,881	75.20	▼2.35
Registered electors		41,065		
Majority		10,421	35.08	▲2.93
BN hold		Swing		

Malaysian general election, 1999
Party	Candidate	Votes	%	∆%
BN	Md Salleh Md Said	17,817	62.16	▼0.76
PBS	Saidil @ Saidi Simoi	8,601	30.01	▼7.07
PAS	Bandira Alang	1,515	5.28	▲5.28
Independent	Maidom Pansai @ Paul	553	1.93	▲1.93
Independent	Mul Marif	179	0.62	▲0.62
Total valid votes		28,665	100.00	
Total rejected ballots		266		
Unreturned ballots		139		
Turnout		29,070	77.55	▼4.16
Registered electors		37,485		
Majority		9,216	32.15	▲6.31
BN hold		Swing		

Malaysian general election, 1995
Party	Candidate	Votes	%	∆%
BN	Md Salleh Md Said	17,368	62.92	▲62.92
PBS	Timbun Laganan @ Herbert Timbun Lagadan	10,237	37.08	▼17.30
Total valid votes		27,605	100.00	
Total rejected ballots		315		
Unreturned ballots		177		
Turnout		28,097	81.71	▲11.42
Registered electors		34,386		
Majority		7,131	25.84	▲15.80
BN gain from PBS		Swing		?

Malaysian general election, 1990
Party	Candidate	Votes	%	∆%
PBS	Maidom Pansai @ Paul Pansai	11,501	54.38	▲54.38
Independent	Lamsil Hamidsor	9,377	44.34	▲44.34
Independent	Mohamed Gelungan Omar @ Rosman	270	1.28	▲1.28
Total valid votes		21,148	100.00	
Total rejected ballots		165		
Unreturned ballots		0		
Turnout		21,313	70.29	▲4.86
Registered electors		30,320		
Majority		2,124	10.04	▼12.96
PBS gain from BN		Swing		?

Malaysian general election, 1986
Party	Candidate	Votes	%	∆%
BN	Maidom Pansai @ Paul Pansai	8,155	49.75	▲18.13
BERJAYA	Yapin Gimpoton	4,384	26.75	▲26.75
PAS	Jamlidi Oleh	3,629	22.14	▲22.14
Independent	Asmara Mohd Bilin	223	1.36	▲1.36
Total valid votes		16,391	100.00	
Total rejected ballots		195		
Unreturned ballots		0		
Turnout		16,586	65.43	▼14.20
Registered electors		25,351		
Majority		3,771	23.00	▼4.06
BN gain from Independent		Swing		?

Malaysian general election, 1982
Party	Candidate	Votes	%	∆%
Independent	Yahya Lampong	9,952	58.68	▲58.68
BN	Pandikar Amin Mulia	5,362	31.62	▼16.14
PASOK	Majikon Moluni	884	5.21	▲5.21
Independent	Mohamed Yakin Mumin	419	2.47	▲2.47
Independent	Sisambin Bungan	262	1.54	▲1.54
PUSAKA	Jailin Toh	80	0.47	▲0.47
Total valid votes		16,959	100.00	
Total rejected ballots		346		
Unreturned ballots		0		
Turnout		17,305	79.63	▼1.72
Registered electors		21,732		
Majority		4,590	27.06	▲13.81
Independent gain from BN		Swing		?

Malaysian general election, 1978
Party	Candidate	Votes	%	∆%
BN	Mohamed Said Keruak	6,737	47.76	▲47.76
Independent	Raskan Asing	4,868	34.51	▲34.51
Independent	Maidom Pansai @ Paul	1,408	9.98	▲9.98
PEKEMAS	Pinjaman Hassin	921	6.53	▲6.53
Parti Sabah Demokratik Rakyat	Rajin Guritom	173	1.23	▲1.23
Total valid votes		14,107	100.00	
Total rejected ballots		504		
Unreturned ballots		0		
Turnout		14,611	81.35	
Registered electors		17,960		
Majority		1,869	13.25	
BN hold		Swing		

Malaysian general election, 1974
Party	Candidate	Votes	%	∆%
On the nomination day, Mohamed Said Keruak won uncontested.
BN	Mohamed Said Keruak			
Total valid votes			100.00	
Total rejected ballots				
Unreturned ballots				
Turnout				
Registered electors		15,097		
Majority				
BN gain from USNO		Swing		?

Malaysian general election, 1969
Party	Candidate	Votes	%
USNO	Mohamed Said Keruak	9,290	79.95
Independent	Pinah Sarian	1,620	13.94
Independent	Awang Abdul Razak	650	5.59
Independent	Madin Sabidol	61	0.52
Total valid votes		11,621	100.00
Total rejected ballots		418	
Unreturned ballots			
Turnout			80.90
Registered electors		14,875	
Majority		7,670	66.01
This was a new constituency created.
