= Mustapha Sakmud =

Malaysian politician and engineer (born 1968)

Yang Berhormat Datuk Mustapha Sakmud PGDK JP MP
- مصطفى سقمود
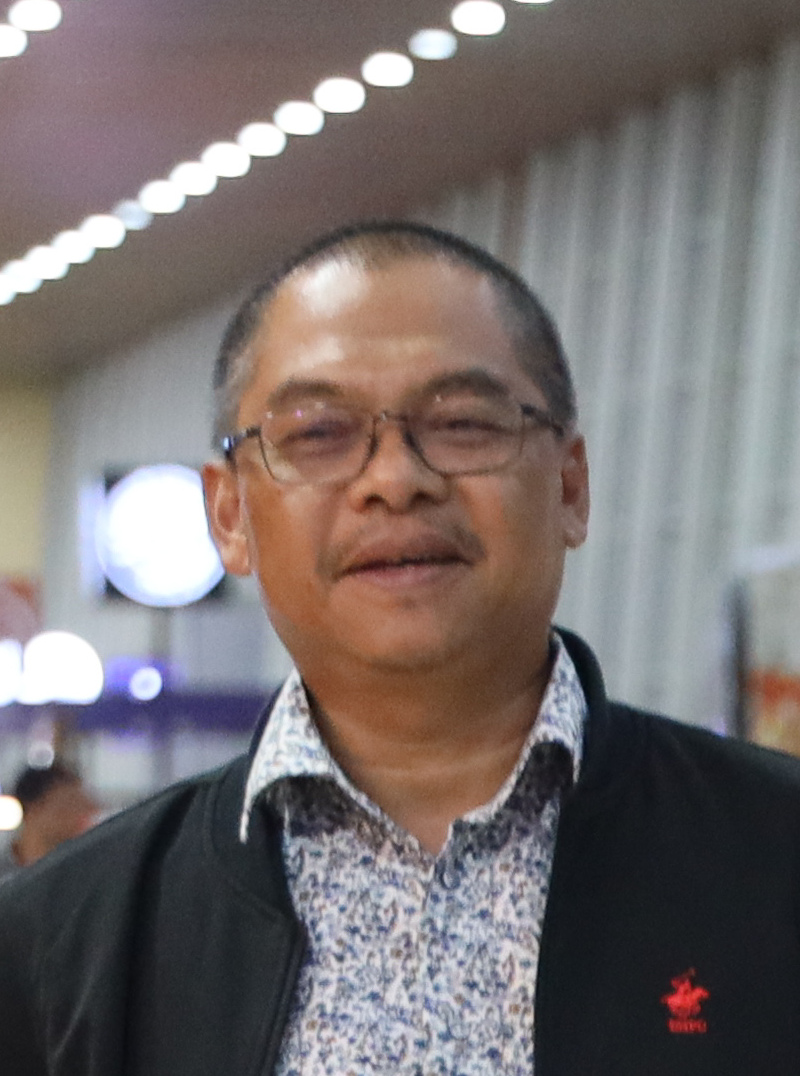
- Mustapha Sakmud in January 2025

Minister in the Prime Minister's Department (Sabah and Sarawak)
- Incumbent
- Assumed office 17 December 2025
- Monarch: Ibrahim Iskandar
- Prime Minister: Anwar Ibrahim
- Preceded by: Armizan Mohd Ali
- Constituency: Sepanggar

Deputy Minister of Higher Education
- In office 12 December 2023 – 17 December 2025
- Monarchs: Abdullah (2023–2024); Ibrahim Iskandar (2024–2025)
- Prime Minister: Anwar Ibrahim
- Minister: Zambry Abdul Kadir
- Preceded by: Yusof Apdal
- Succeeded by: Adam Adli
- Constituency: Sepanggar

Deputy Minister of Human Resources
- In office 10 December 2022 – 12 December 2023
- Monarch: Abdullah
- Prime Minister: Anwar Ibrahim
- Minister: Sivakumar Varatharaju
- Preceded by: Awang Hashim
- Succeeded by: Abdul Rahman Mohamad
- Constituency: Sepanggar

State Chairman of the People's Justice Party of Sabah
- Incumbent
- Assumed office 26 May 2024
- President: Anwar Ibrahim
- Deputy: Peto Galim
- Preceded by: Sangkar Rasam

Member of the Malaysian Parliament for Sepanggar
- Incumbent
- Assumed office 19 November 2022
- Preceded by: Azis Jamman (WARISAN)
- Majority: 7,042 (2022)

Personal details
- Born: Mustapha @ Mohd Yunus bin Sakmud; 9 July 1969 (age 57) Kota Belud, Sabah, Malaysia
- Party: People's Justice Party (PKR)
- Other political affiliations: Pakatan Harapan (PH)
- Education: Universiti Malaysia Sabah (B.Eng); University of Aberdeen (MBA)
- Occupation: Politician
- Profession: Engineer

Mustapha @ Mohd Yunus bin Sakmud, also known as Mustapha Sakmud (born 9 July 1969), is a Malaysian politician and engineer who has served as the Minister in the Prime Minister's Department in charge of Sabah and Sarawak in the Unity Government administration under Prime Minister Anwar Ibrahim since December 2025 as well as the Member of Parliament (MP) for Sepanggar since November 2022. He served as the Deputy Minister of Higher Education in the Unity Government administration under Prime Minister Anwar and Minister Zambry Abdul Kadir from December 2023 to his promotion in December 2025 and Deputy Minister of Human Resources in the PH administration under Prime Minister Anwar and Minister Sivakumar Varatharaju from December 2022 to December 2023. He is a member and Branch Chief of Kota Belud of the People's Justice Party (PKR), a component party of the PH coalition. He has also served as the State Chairman of PKR of Sabah since May 2024.

== Election results ==
Sabah State Legislative Assembly
Year	Constituency	Candidate	Votes	Pct	Opponent(s)	Votes	Pct	Ballots cast	Majority	Turnout
2013	N08 Usukan	Mustapha Sakmud (PKR)	4,067	27.24%	Salleh Said Keruak (UMNO)	10,879	70.85%	15,603	6,812	83.40%
2013	N08 Usukan	Mustapha Sakmud (PKR)	4,067	27.24%	Bakhruddin Ismail (STAR)	285	1.91%	15,603	6,812	83.40%
2018	N06 Tempasuk	Mustapha Sakmud (PKR)	5,478	35.95%	Musbah Jamli (UMNO)	7,742	50.82%	15,726	2,264	82.20%
2018	N06 Tempasuk	Mustapha Sakmud (PKR)	5,478	35.95%	Suwah Buleh (STAR)	1,494	9.81%	15,726	2,264	82.20%
2018	N06 Tempasuk	Mustapha Sakmud (PKR)	5,478	35.95%	Mustaqim Aling (PAS)	521	3.42%	15,726	2,264	82.20%
2020	N09 Tempasuk	Mustapha Sakmud (PKR)	1,852	20.30%	Mohd Arsad Bistari (UMNO)	4,040	44.28%	9,124	1,685	76.06%
2020	N09 Tempasuk	Mustapha Sakmud (PKR)	1,852	20.30%	Musbah Jamli (IND)	2,355	25.81%	9,124	1,685	76.06%
2020	N09 Tempasuk	Mustapha Sakmud (PKR)	1,852	20.30%	Amza @ Hamzah Sundang (USNO Baru)	471	5.16%	9,124	1,685	76.06%
2020	N09 Tempasuk	Mustapha Sakmud (PKR)	1,852	20.30%	Abdul Alif Saibeh (PCS)	133	1.46%	9,124	1,685	76.06%
2020	N09 Tempasuk	Mustapha Sakmud (PKR)	1,852	20.30%	Kanul Gindol (PGRS)	57	0.62%	9,124	1,685	76.06%

Parliament of Malaysia
Year	Constituency	Candidate	Votes	Pct	Opponent(s)	Votes	Pct	Ballots cast	Majority	Turnout
2022	P171 Sepanggar	Mustapha Sakmud (PKR)	27,022	38.44%	Yakubah Khan (UMNO)	19,980	28.42%	70,304	7,042	64.87%
2022	P171 Sepanggar	Mustapha Sakmud (PKR)	27,022	38.44%	Mohd Azis Jamman (WARISAN)	18,594	26.45%	70,304	7,042	64.87%
2022	P171 Sepanggar	Mustapha Sakmud (PKR)	27,022	38.44%	Jumardie Lukman (KDM)	3,977	5.66%	70,304	7,042	64.87%
2022	P171 Sepanggar	Mustapha Sakmud (PKR)	27,022	38.44%	Yusof Kunchang (PEJUANG)	731	1.04%	70,304	7,042	64.87%

== Honours ==
- Malaysia
  - Recipient of the 17th Yang di-Pertuan Agong Installation Medal
- Sabah
  - Commander of the Order of Kinabalu (PGDK) – Datuk (2023)
  - Justice of the Peace (JP) (2018)
