= Fairuz Renddan =

Malaysian politician (born 1984)

Yang Berhormat Datuk Fairuz Renddan PGDK MLA
- فيروز رينددان

Sabah State Assistant Minister of Local Government and Housing
- Incumbent
- Assumed office 2 December 2025 Serving with Maijol Mahap
- Minister: Mohd Arifin Mohd Arif
- Governor: Musa Aman
- Chief Minister: Hajiji Noor
- Preceded by: Isnin Aliasnih
- Constituency: Pintasan

Sabah State Assistant Minister of Youth and Sports
- In office 26 January 2023 – 30 November 2025
- Minister: Ellron Alfred Angin
- Governor: Juhar Mahiruddin (2023–2024); Musa Aman (2025)
- Chief Minister: Hajiji Noor
- Preceded by: Andi Suryady
- Constituency: Pintasan

Sabah Assistant Minister of Special Tasks and Coordination
- In office 26 October 2022 – 26 January 2023
- Governor: Juhar Mahiruddin
- Chief Minister: Hajiji Noor
- Preceded by: Position established
- Succeeded by: Position abolished
- Constituency: Pintasan

Member of the Sabah State Legislative Assembly for Pintasan
- Incumbent
- Assumed office 26 September 2020
- Preceded by: Position established
- Majority: 84 (2020); 1,070 (2025)

Youth Chief of Parti Gagasan Rakyat Sabah
- In office 5 January 2023 – 14 November 2025
- President: Hajiji Noor
- Vice Chief: Azrul Ibrahim
- Succeeded by: Azrul Ibrahim (Acting)

Personal details
- Born: Fairuz bin Renddan; 11 September 1984 (age 41) Kota Belud, Sabah, Malaysia
- Party: Malaysian United Indigenous Party of Sabah (Sabah BERSATU) (2020–2022); Parti Gagasan Rakyat Sabah (GAGASAN) (2023–2025); Independent (since 2025)
- Other political affiliations: Perikatan Nasional (PN) (2020–2022); Gabungan Rakyat Sabah (GRS) (2020–2025)
- Spouse: Siti Norlyana Abdul Latiff Bledram
- Occupation: Politician

Fairuz Renddan (born 11 September 1984) is a Malaysian politician who has served as State Assistant Minister of Local Government and Housing of Sabah in the Gabungan Rakyat Sabah (GRS) state administration under Chief Minister Hajiji Noor and Minister Mohd Arifin Mohd Arif since December 2025 and Member of the Sabah State Legislative Assembly (MLA) for Pintasan since September 2020. He previously served as State Assistant Minister of Youth and Sports of Sabah from January 2023 until November 2025 and State Assistant Minister of Special Tasks and Coordination from October 2022 to January 2023 in the GRS state administration under Chief Minister Hajiji. He also served as a Political secretary to Chief Minister Hajiji from 2020 to his appointment as an assistant minister in 2022. He was a member of the Parti Gagasan Rakyat Sabah (GAGASAN), a component party of the GRS coalition and was a member of the Malaysian United Indigenous Party of Sabah (Sabah BERSATU), a branch of a component party of the Perikatan Nasional (PN) and formerly GRS coalition. He served as the State Youth Chief of Sabah BERSATU and Division Youth Chief of BERSATU of Kota Belud. He left Sabah BERSATU on 10 December 2022 and joined GAGASAN on 5 February 2023 and subsequently appointed as the party's Youth Chief until his resignation from the party in November 2025.

== Election result ==
Sabah State Legislative Assembly
Year	Constituency	Candidate	Votes	Pct.	Opponent(s)	Votes	Pct	Ballots cast	Majority	Turnout
2020	N08 Pintasan	Fairuz Renddan (Sabah BERSATU)	2,744	32.69%	Pandikar Amin Mulia (USNO Baru)	2,660	31.69%	8,395	84	75.81%
2020	N08 Pintasan	Fairuz Renddan (Sabah BERSATU)	2,744	32.69%	Mohd Safian Saludin (WARISAN)	1,816	21.63%	8,395	84	75.81%
2020	N08 Pintasan	Fairuz Renddan (Sabah BERSATU)	2,744	32.69%	Almudin Kaida (IND)	780	9.29%	8,395	84	75.81%
2020	N08 Pintasan	Fairuz Renddan (Sabah BERSATU)	2,744	32.69%	Padlan Samad (PCS)	188	2.24%	8,395	84	75.81%
2020	N08 Pintasan	Fairuz Renddan (Sabah BERSATU)	2,744	32.69%	Roslan Mayahman (PPRS)	50	0.60%	8,395	84	75.81%
2025	N08 Pintasan	Fairuz Renddan (IND)	4,675	39.32%	Pandikar Amin Mulia (USNO Baru)	3,605	30.32%	11,891	1,070	74.80%
2025	N08 Pintasan	Fairuz Renddan (IND)	4,675	39.32%	Abdullah Otong (WARISAN)	1,167	9.81%	11,891	1,070	74.80%
2025	N08 Pintasan	Fairuz Renddan (IND)	4,675	39.32%	Tadzul Radim (Sabah UMNO)	1,024	8.61%	11,891	1,070	74.80%
2025	N08 Pintasan	Fairuz Renddan (IND)	4,675	39.32%	Almudin Kaida (KDM)	365	3.07%	11,891	1,070	74.80%
2025	N08 Pintasan	Fairuz Renddan (IND)	4,675	39.32%	Tajuddin Padis (IND)	356	2.99%	11,891	1,070	74.80%
2025	N08 Pintasan	Fairuz Renddan (IND)	4,675	39.32%	Raplin Samat (STAR)	210	1.77%	11,891	1,070	74.80%
2025	N08 Pintasan	Fairuz Renddan (IND)	4,675	39.32%	Awang Saleh Makmud (Sabah BERSATU)	196	1.65%	11,891	1,070	74.80%
2025	N08 Pintasan	Fairuz Renddan (IND)	4,675	39.32%	Mohd Rizal Saiman (IND)	116	0.98%	11,891	1,070	74.80%
2025	N08 Pintasan	Fairuz Renddan (IND)	4,675	39.32%	Syarif Mohd Shukree Danchingan (IND)	102	0.86%	11,891	1,070	74.80%
2025	N08 Pintasan	Fairuz Renddan (IND)	4,675	39.32%	Lomog Rudin @ Efejus Rudin (IMPIAN)	75	0.63%	11,891	1,070	74.80%

== Honours ==
- Sabah
  - Commander of the Order of Kinabalu (PGDK) – Datuk (2022)
  - Companion of the Order of Kinabalu (ASDK) (2020)
