= Musbah Jamli =

Malaysian politician

Yang Berbahagia Datuk Musbah Jamli PGDK
- مصباح جمالي

Ministerial roles (Sabah)
- 2008–2018: Assistant Minister of Agriculture and Food Industries
- 2018: Minister of Resources and Information Technology Development

Faction represented in Sabah State Legislative Assembly
- 1999–2004: Barisan Nasional
- 2008–2018: Barisan Nasional
- 2018–2019: Independent
- 2019–2020: Sabah Heritage Party

Personal details
- Born: Musbah bin Jamli Kota Belud, Crown Colony of North Borneo (now Sabah, Malaysia)
- Citizenship: Malaysian
- Party: United Malays National Organisation (UMNO) (till 2018); Sabah Heritage Party (WARISAN) (2019–2020); Independent (2020–present)
- Other political affiliations: Barisan Nasional (BN) (till 2018)
- Occupation: Politician

Musbah bin Jamli is a Malaysian politician who served as the State Minister of Resources and Information Technology Development. He served as the Member of Sabah State Legislative Assembly (MLA) for Tempasuk from March 2008 until September 2020.

== Election results ==
Sabah State Legislative Assembly
Year	Constituency	Candidate	Votes	Pct	Opponent(s)	Votes	Pct	Ballots cast	Majority	Turnout
1990	N07 Tempasuk	Musbah Jamli (USNO)	2,572	32.83%	Robert Ripin Minggir (PBS)	2,915	37.20%	7,935	343	82.19%
1990	N07 Tempasuk	Musbah Jamli (USNO)	2,572	32.83%	Pandikar Amin Mulia (AKAR)	1,139	14.54%	7,935	343	82.19%
1990	N07 Tempasuk	Musbah Jamli (USNO)	2,572	32.83%	Mohammad Noor Mansoor (BERJAYA)	1,089	13.90%	7,935	343	82.19%
1990	N07 Tempasuk	Musbah Jamli (USNO)	2,572	32.83%	Jumit Panau (PRS)	105	1.34%	7,935	343	82.19%
1990	N07 Tempasuk	Musbah Jamli (USNO)	2,572	32.83%	Mukamad Abdullah (IND)	15	0.19%	7,935	343	82.19%
1999	N06 Tempasuk	Musbah Jamli (UMNO)	4,911	50.15%	Abdul Salam Gibang (PBS)	4,176	42.64%	9,927	735	81.11%
1999	N06 Tempasuk	Musbah Jamli (UMNO)	4,911	50.15%	Ibrahim Linggam (BERSEKUTU)	368	3.76%	9,927	735	81.11%
1999	N06 Tempasuk	Musbah Jamli (UMNO)	4,911	50.15%	Mohd Aminuddin Aling (PAS)	239	2.44%	9,927	735	81.11%
1999	N06 Tempasuk	Musbah Jamli (UMNO)	4,911	50.15%	Dausin Pangalin (IND)	61	0.62%	9,927	735	81.11%
1999	N06 Tempasuk	Musbah Jamli (UMNO)	4,911	50.15%	Masud Nanang (SETIA)	38	0.39%	9,927	735	81.11%
2008	N06 Tempasuk	Musbah Jamli (UMNO)	6,541	60.34%	Laiman Ikin (PKR)	4,109	37.90%	11,165	2,432	78.14%
2008	N06 Tempasuk	Musbah Jamli (UMNO)	6,541	60.34%	Ibrahim Linggam (IND)	191	1.76%	11,165	2,432	78.14%
2013	N06 Tempasuk	Musbah Jamli (UMNO)	8,495	61.26%	Laiman Ikin (PAS)	3,285	23.68%	14,193	5,210	84.30%
2013	N06 Tempasuk	Musbah Jamli (UMNO)	8,495	61.26%	Suwah Buleh (STAR)	1,769	12.76%	14,193	5,210	84.30%
2013	N06 Tempasuk	Musbah Jamli (UMNO)	8,495	61.26%	Abdul Malek Mohed (SAPP)	319	2.30%	14,193	5,210	84.30%
2018	N06 Tempasuk	Musbah Jamli (UMNO)	7,742	50.82%	Mustapha Sakmud (PKR)	5,478	35.95%	15,726	2,264	82.20%
2018	N06 Tempasuk	Musbah Jamli (UMNO)	7,742	50.82%	Suwah Buleh (STAR)	1,494	9.81%	15,726	2,264	82.20%
2018	N06 Tempasuk	Musbah Jamli (UMNO)	7,742	50.82%	Mustaqim Aling (PAS)	521	3.42%	15,726	2,264	82.20%
2020	N09 Tempasuk	Musbah Jamli (IND)	2,355	33.69%	Mohd Arsad Bistari (UMNO)	4,040	45.35%	8,908	1,685	74.26%
2020	N09 Tempasuk	Musbah Jamli (IND)	2,355	33.69%	Mustapha Sakmud (PKR)	1,852	15.44%	8,908	1,685	74.26%
2020	N09 Tempasuk	Musbah Jamli (IND)	2,355	33.69%	Amza Sundang (USNO)	471	3.93%	8,908	1,685	74.26%
2020	N09 Tempasuk	Musbah Jamli (IND)	2,355	33.69%	Abd. Alif Saibeh (PCS)	133	1.11%	8,908	1,685	74.26%
2020	N09 Tempasuk	Musbah Jamli (IND)	2,355	33.69%	Kanul Gindol (GAGASAN)	57	0.48%	8,908	1,685	74.26%

== Honours ==
- Sabah
  - Commander of the Order of Kinabalu (PGDK) – Datuk (2003)
