= Pandikar Amin Mulia =

Malaysian politician

Yang Berbahagia Tan Sri Datuk Seri Panglima Pandikar Amin Mulia PSM SPDK SUMW DUPN PGDK JSM
- ڤنديکر أمين مليا
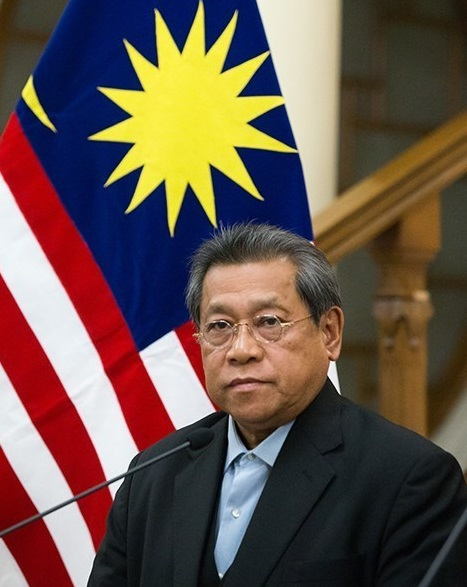

8th Speaker of the Dewan Rakyat
- In office 28 April 2008 – 6 April 2018
- Monarchs: Mizan Zainal Abidin; Abdul Halim; Muhammad V
- Prime Minister: Abdullah Ahmad Badawi; Najib Razak
- Deputy: Ronald Kiandee; Wan Junaidi Tuanku Jaafar (2008–2013); Ismail Mohamed Said (2013–2018)
- Preceded by: Ramli Ngah Talib
- Succeeded by: Mohamad Ariff Md Yusof
- Constituency: non-MP (Barisan Nasional)

Sabah State Minister of Agriculture and Fisheries
- In office 28 May 1997 – 14 March 1999
- Governor: Sakaran Dandai
- Chief Minister: Yong Teck Lee; Bernard Giluk Dompok
- Deputy: Aklee Abbas
- Preceded by: Lajim Ukin
- Succeeded by: Lajim Ukin as Minister of Agriculture and Food Industry
- Constituency: Tempasuk

Sabah State Minister of Culture, Youth and Sports
- In office 16 March 1994 – 27 May 1997
- Governor: Mohammad Said Keruak; Sakaran Dandai
- Chief Minister: Sakaran Dandai; Salleh Said Keruak
- Deputy: Surady Kayong
- Preceded by: Lajim Ukin
- Succeeded by: Wilfred Bumburing
- Constituency: Tempasuk

Minister in the Prime Minister's Department
- In office 15 December 1999 – 20 November 2002
- Monarchs: Salahuddin; Sirajuddin
- Prime Minister: Mahathir Mohamad
- Deputy: Shahrizat Abdul Jalil (1999–2001); Tengku Adnan Tengku Mansor (2001–2002)
- Preceded by: Tajol Rosli Mohd Ghazali
- Succeeded by: Tengku Adnan Tengku Mansor
- Constituency: Senator

President of the United Sabah National Organisation (New)
- Incumbent
- Assumed office 18 February 2021
- Deputy: Leong Chan Chu; Ibrahim Linggam
- Preceded by: Ibrahim Linggam

President of the People's Justice Front
- In office 1989–1995
- Preceded by: Position established
- Succeeded by: Position abolished

Member of the Sabah State Legislative Assembly for Tempasuk
- In office 21 March 2004 – 8 March 2008
- Preceded by: Musbah Jamli
- Succeeded by: Musbah Jamli
- In office 16 March 1994 – 14 March 1999
- Preceded by: Robert Ripin Minggir
- Succeeded by: Musbah Jamli

Member of the Sabah State Legislative Assembly for Usukan
- In office 1982–1985
- Preceded by: Mohamed Said Keruak
- Succeeded by: Mustapha Harun

Personal details
- Born: Pandikar Amin bin Mulia; 17 September 1955 (age 71) Kota Belud, Crown Colony of North Borneo (now Sabah, Malaysia)
- Citizenship: Malaysian
- Party: USNO Baru (since 2020); Independent (2018-2020); UMNO (2002-2018); AKAR (1989-2002); USNO (1982-1989)
- Other political affiliations: Barisan Nasional (BN) (1986-2018); Gabungan Rakyat Sabah (GRS) (since 2022)
- Spouse(s): Diana Yusof Diego; Hadijah Abdullah Teng (co-wife; polygamous marriage)
- Education: University of Wolverhampton; Lincoln's Inn
- Occupation: Politician
- Profession: Lawyer

Pandikar Amin bin Mulia (Jawi: ڤنديكر أمين بن مليا; born 17 September 1955) is a Malaysian politician who has served as President of United Sabah National Organisation (New) (USNO Baru) since February 2021. He served as 8th Speaker of the Dewan Rakyat from April 2008 to April 2018, Minister in the Prime Minister's Department from December 1999 to November 2002, State Minister of Agriculture and Fisheries of Sabah from May 1997 to March 1999, State Minister of Culture, Youth and Sports of Sabah from March 1994 to May 1997, Member of the Sabah State Legislative Assembly (MLA) for Tempasuk from 1994 to 1999 and again from March 2004 to March 2008, Member of the Sabah State Legislative Assembly (MLA) for Usukan from 1982 to 1985 as well as a former cum founding President of the People's Justice Front (AKAR) from 1989 to 1995. He is also the first Sabahan, East Malaysian and also ethnic Bajau Iranun to hold the office of the Speaker of the Dewan Rakyat.

== Early background ==
Pandikar Amin was born in a remote village in Kota Belud, Sabah to Bajau Iranun farmer parents who were of poor backgrounds and started primary schooling in his hometown. Prior to going to England for tertiary education, he received education at Sabah College in Kota Kinabalu, a prestigious elite secondary school of the state. He was a graduate of Wolverhampton Polytechnic and Lincoln's Inn.

== Political career ==
=== USNO ===
Pandikar Amin entered politics in 1982 as a member of United Sabah National Organisation (USNO) and later picked as the Barisan Nasional (BN) parliamentary candidate for Kota Belud in 1982 general elections but lost to an independent candidate. At the age of 27, however he became Sabah state assemblyman for Usukan, holding for one term from 1982 to 1985. He was then later appointed the first non-MLA Speaker of Sabah State Legislative Assembly from 1986 to 1988.

=== AKAR ===
Pandikar with another fellow dissident United Sabah Party (PBS) comprising a few Dusun and Bajau ethnic-based leaders namely Mark Koding and Kalakau Untol formed the People's Justice Front (AKAR) in 1989. In 1999, he was appointed a Senator and Minister in the Prime Minister's Department until 2002. He was president of AKAR, a now-defunct Sabahan political party which joined as one of the Barisan Nasional component parties from Sabah, at that time. The party was then dissolved to enable its members to join the United Malays National Organisation (UMNO) in 2002 where Pandikar-faction choice to join, meanwhile half of the AKAR members join PGRS in 2013 where Ationg Tituh-faction established.

=== UMNO and Speakership in the Dewan Rakyat ===
Pandikar, as a member of UMNO was elected again Sabah assemblyman from 2004 to 2008; for the Tempasuk seat in Kota Belud. After the 2008 general elections, the BN coalition government announced that Pandikar, a non-MP would be the new Speaker, replacing Ramli Ngah Talib.

The 12th Parliament was the first to be presided over entirely by East Malaysians; Pandikar and his deputies, Wan Junaidi Tuanku Jaafar and Ronald Kiandee, hail from either Sabah or Sarawak. In mid-May, after Parliament convened, Pandikar resigned as Kota Marudu UMNO divisional chief, citing the need to be a neutral, non-partisan presiding officer of the legislature. He denied his resignation was linked to possible party-switching amongst UMNO MPs from East Malaysia.

Ahead of the 2018 general elections, Pandikar announced his intention to contest, thus enable his possible prospect to be a more active federal-elected politician after serving as a non-MP Speaker for two terms. Somehow he was not picked as candidate to contest the elections that saw the downfall of BN in both the federal and state governments. Despite his appointment to the UMNO's supreme council later on 14 July 2018; he decided to quit UMNO on 12 December 2018 along with other Sabah UMNO assemblymen to be independents.

=== USNO Baru ===
Pandikar then later joined a newly revived Sabahan political party known as the USNO Baru and was appointed as the chairman of the party's Strategic Advisory Council in July 2019. He then contested the Pintasan state seat during the September 2020 Sabah state election under USNO Baru but he together with all the party's candidates in other state seats they contested were defeated in cornered fights with candidates from rival parties and/or coalitions. Pandikar was officially elected party president in February 2021 and remains in the position as of 2023, proceeds to became the main reason of the local political coalition, GRS accepting USNO Baru as a component member.

== Election results ==
Sabah State Legislative Assembly
Year	Constituency	Candidate	Votes	Pct	Opponent(s)	Votes	Pct	Ballots cast	Majority	Turnout
1982	N07 Usukan	Pandikar Amin Mulia (USNO)	Unknown							
1990	N07 Tempasuk	Pandikar Amin Mulia (AKAR)	1,139	14.54%	Robert Ripin Minggir (PBS)	2,915	37.20%	7,935	343	82.19%
1990	N07 Tempasuk	Pandikar Amin Mulia (AKAR)	1,139	14.54%	Musbah Jamli (USNO)	2,572	32.83%	7,935	343	82.19%
1990	N07 Tempasuk	Pandikar Amin Mulia (AKAR)	1,139	14.54%	Mohammad Noor Mansoor (BERJAYA)	1,089	13.90%	7,935	343	82.19%
1990	N07 Tempasuk	Pandikar Amin Mulia (AKAR)	1,139	14.54%	Jumit Panau (PRS)	105	1.34%	7,935	343	82.19%
1990	N07 Tempasuk	Pandikar Amin Mulia (AKAR)	1,139	14.54%	Mukamad Abdullah (IND)	15	0.19%	7,935	343	82.19%
1994	N07 Tempasuk	Pandikar Amin Mulia (AKAR)	4,142	49.59%	Dausin Pangalin (PBS)	3,195	38.25%	8,474	947	78.04%
1994	N07 Tempasuk	Pandikar Amin Mulia (AKAR)	4,142	49.59%	Suwah Buleh (IND)	1,016	12.16%	8,474	947	78.04%
2004	N06 Tempasuk	Pandikar Amin Mulia (UMNO)	6,044	58.76%	Digong Abd Rashid (IND)	2,604	25.31%	10,592	3,440	76.25%
2004	N06 Tempasuk	Pandikar Amin Mulia (UMNO)	6,044	58.76%	Josli Padis (BERSEKUTU)	916	8.91%	10,592	3,440	76.25%
2004	N06 Tempasuk	Pandikar Amin Mulia (UMNO)	6,044	58.76%	Bandira Alang (PAS)	426	4.14%	10,592	3,440	76.25%
2004	N06 Tempasuk	Pandikar Amin Mulia (UMNO)	6,044	58.76%	Razak Rakunman (IND)	296	2.88%	10,592	3,440	76.25%
2020	N08 Pintasan	Pandikar Amin Mulia (USNO Baru)	2,660	32.29%	Fairuz Renddan (BERSATU)	2,744	33.31%	8,238	84	75.81%
2020	N08 Pintasan	Pandikar Amin Mulia (USNO Baru)	2,660	32.29%	Mohd Safian Saludin (WARISAN)	1,816	22.04%	8,238	84	75.81%
2020	N08 Pintasan	Pandikar Amin Mulia (USNO Baru)	2,660	32.29%	Almudin Kaida (IND)	780	9.47%	8,238	84	75.81%
2020	N08 Pintasan	Pandikar Amin Mulia (USNO Baru)	2,660	32.29%	Padlan Samad (PCS)	188	2.28%	8,238	84	75.81%
2020	N08 Pintasan	Pandikar Amin Mulia (USNO Baru)	2,660	32.29%	Roslan Mayahman (PPRS)	50	0.61%	8,238	84	75.81%
2025	N08 Pintasan	Pandikar Amin Mulia (GRS)	3,605	30.32%	Fairuz Renddan (IND)	2,744	33.31%	4,675	84	39.32%
2025	N08 Pintasan	Pandikar Amin Mulia (GRS)	3,605	30.32%	Abdullah Otong (WARISAN)	1,167	9.81%	4,675	84	39.32%
2025	N08 Pintasan	Pandikar Amin Mulia (GRS)	3,605	30.32%	Tadzul Radim (BN)	1,024	8.61%	4,675	84	39.32%
2025	N08 Pintasan	Pandikar Amin Mulia (GRS)	3,605	30.32%	Almudin Kaida (KDM)	365	3.07%	4,675	84	39.32%

Parliament of Malaysia
Year	Constituency	Candidate	Votes	Pct	Opponent(s)	Votes	Pct	Ballots cast	Majority	Turnout
1982	P117 Kota Belud	Pandikar Amin Mulia (USNO)	5,362	31.62%	Yahya Lampong (IND)	9,952	58.68%	17,305	4,590	79.63%
1982	P117 Kota Belud	Pandikar Amin Mulia (USNO)	5,362	31.62%	Majikon Moluni (PASOK)	884	5.21%	17,305	4,590	79.63%
1982	P117 Kota Belud	Pandikar Amin Mulia (USNO)	5,362	31.62%	Mohamed Yakin Mumin (IND)	419	2.47%	17,305	4,590	79.63%
1982	P117 Kota Belud	Pandikar Amin Mulia (USNO)	5,362	31.62%	Sisambin Bungan (IND)	262	1.54%	17,305	4,590	79.63%
1982	P117 Kota Belud	Pandikar Amin Mulia (USNO)	5,362	31.62%	Jailin Toh (PUSAKA)	80	0.47%	17,305	4,590	79.63%
1990	P145 Tanjong Aru	Pandikar Amin Mulia (AKAR)	763	4.62%	Joseph Voon Shin Choi (PBS)	8,504	51.55%	16,671	3,817	55.97%
1990	P145 Tanjong Aru	Pandikar Amin Mulia (AKAR)	763	4.62%	Jabar (IND)	4,687	28.41%	16,671	3,817	55.97%
1990	P145 Tanjong Aru	Pandikar Amin Mulia (AKAR)	763	4.62%	Hsing Yin Shean (DAP)	2,507	15.20%	16,671	3,817	55.97%
1990	P145 Tanjong Aru	Pandikar Amin Mulia (AKAR)	763	4.62%	Charles Tulis @ Mohd Salleh (IND)	37	0.22%	16,671	3,817	55.97%

== Honours ==
- Malaysia
  - Commander of the Order of Loyalty to the Crown of Malaysia (PSM) – Tan Sri (2002)
  - Companion of the Order of Loyalty to the Crown of Malaysia (JSM) (1993)
- Federal Territory (Malaysia)
  - Grand Knight of the Order of the Territorial Crown (SUMW) – Datuk Seri Utama (2009)
- Penang
  - Knight Grand Commander of the Order of the Defender of State (DUPN) – Dato' Seri Utama (2013)
- Sabah
  - Grand Commander of the Order of Kinabalu (SPDK) – Datuk Seri Panglima (2010)
  - Commander of the Order of Kinabalu (PGDK) – Datuk (1994)

Political offices
Preceded by Ramli Ngah Talib	Speaker of the Dewan Rakyat; 2008 – 2018	Succeeded by Mohd Ariff Md Yusof
