= Yahya Lampong =

Malaysian politician (1940–2026)

Yang Berbahagia Datuk Mohammad Yahya Lampong PGDK
- محمد يحي لمڤوڠ

Member of the Malaysian Parliament for Kota Belud
- In office 1982–1986
- Preceded by: Mohamad Said Keruak
- Succeeded by: Paul Maidom Pansai

Member of the Sabah State Legislative Assembly for Tempasuk
- In office 1985–1986
- Preceded by: Mohamed Noor Mansoor
- Succeeded by: Robert Ripin Minggir

Personal details
- Born: Mohammad Yahya bin Lampong; 3 January 1940 Kinarut, Papar, British North Borneo
- Died: 21 September 2026 (aged 86) KPJ Ampang Puteri Specialist Hospital, Ampang Jaya, Selangor, Malaysia
- Citizenship: Malaysian
- Party: USNO (till 1990); UMNO (1990-1999, 1999-2012); BERSEKUTU (1999); PKR (since 2012)
- Other political affiliations: Barisan Nasional (1990-1999, 1999-2012); Pakatan Harapan (since 2015)
- Occupation: Politician

Mohammad Yahya bin Lampong (3 January 1940 – 21 September 2026) was a Malaysian politician from PKR. He was the Member of Parliament for Kota Belud from 1982 to 1986 and Member of Sabah State Legislative Assembly for Tempasuk from 1985 to 1986. Lampong was also the Deputy Minister of Rural Development.

== Politics ==
In 1990, he joined UMNO after USNO was dissolved and he became the Division Chief of UMNO Tanjung Aru. In 1999, he left UMNO and joined BERSEKUTU but rejoined UMNO within 12 hours. On 23 August 2001, he was removed as the Division Chief of UMNO Tanjung Aru by the Disciplinary Committee. In 2012, he quit UMNO again and joined PKR. He said that he decided to leave UMNO due to Nik Aziz's influence. He was also the pro tem Vice-President of Perkasa till 2009.

== Death ==
Yahya Lampong died on 21 September 2026, at the age of 86.

== Election result ==
Parliament of Malaysia
| Year | Constituency | Candidate | Votes | Pct | Opponent(s) | Votes | Pct | Ballots cast | Majority | Turnout |
|---|---|---|---|---|---|---|---|---|---|---|
| 1982 | P117 Kota Belud | Yahya Lampong (IND) | 9,952 | 57.51% | Pandikar Amin Mulia (USNO) | 5,362 | 30.99% | 17,305 | 4,590 | 79.63% |
| 1982 | P117 Kota Belud | Yahya Lampong (IND) | 9,952 | 57.51% | Majikon Moluni (PASOK) | 884 | 5.11% | 17,305 | 4,590 | 79.63% |
| 1982 | P117 Kota Belud | Yahya Lampong (IND) | 9,952 | 57.51% | Mohamed Yakin Mumin (IND) | 419 | 2.42% | 17,305 | 4,590 | 79.63% |
| 1982 | P117 Kota Belud | Yahya Lampong (IND) | 9,952 | 57.51% | Sisambin Bungan (IND) | 262 | 1.51% | 17,305 | 4,590 | 79.63% |
| 1982 | P117 Kota Belud | Yahya Lampong (IND) | 9,952 | 57.51% | Jailin Toh (PUSAKA) | 80 | 0.46% | 17,305 | 4,590 | 79.63% |
| 2013 | P175 Papar | Yahya Lampong (PKR) | 10,661 | 32.05% | Rosnah Abdul Rashid Shirlin (UMNO) | 21,196 | 63.72% | 33,262 | 10,535 | 85.79% |
| 2013 | P175 Papar | Yahya Lampong (PKR) | 10,661 | 32.05% | Balon Mujim (STAR) | 838 | 2.52% | 33,262 | 10,535 | 85.79% |

== Honours ==
- Sabah
  - Commander of the Order of Kinabalu (PGDK) – Datuk (1998)
