= Pekan Nabalu =

Town and mukim of Kota Belud, Sabah

- Town and mukim
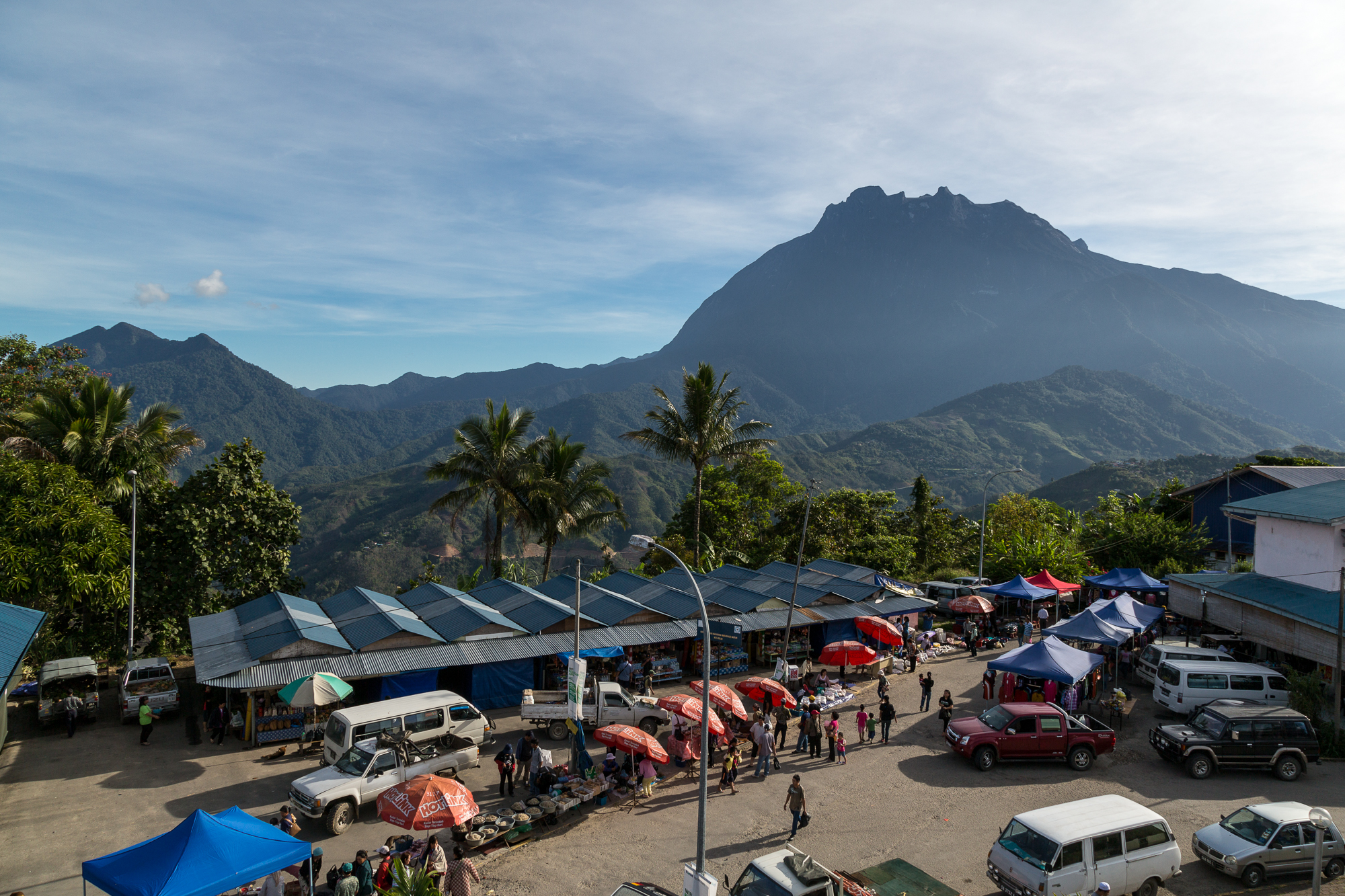

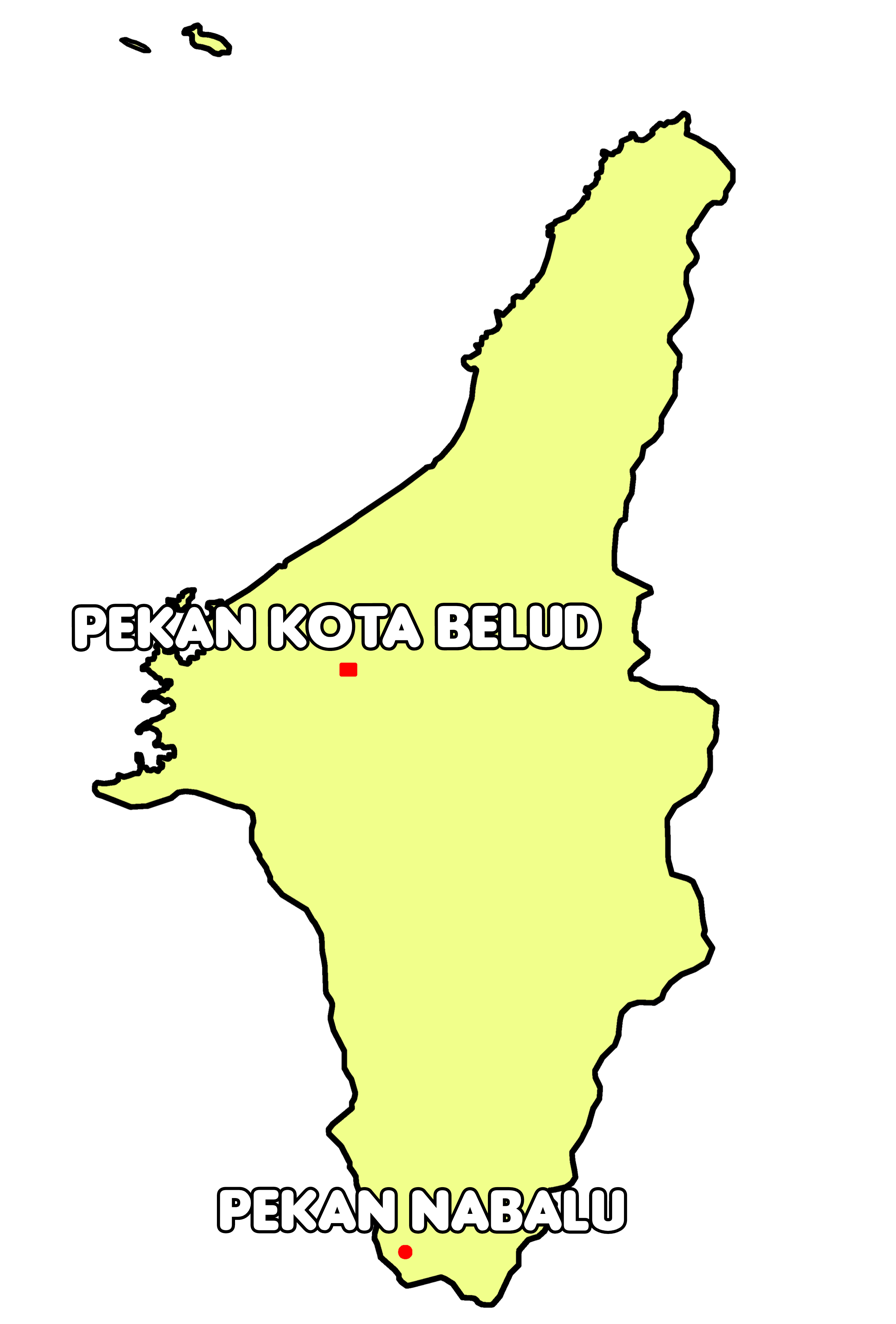
- Location of Pekan Nabalu in Kota Belud District

- Location within Malaysia
- Coordinates: 6°1′40″N 116°27′47″E
- Country: Malaysia
- State: Sabah
- Nickname: The Heart of the West Coast Division
- Division: West Coast Division
- District: Kota Belud
- Elevation: 761 m (2,497 ft)
- Highest elevation: 1,442 m (4,731 ft)
- Time zone: UTC+8 (MST)

Pekan Nabalu (transl. Nabalu Town in English), also known as the Heart of the West Coast Division, is a town and mukim (township) of the Kota Belud District of Sabah, Malaysia. It is located within the Crocker Range, near the foothills of Mount Kinabalu, right in the middle of the upper West Coast Division and this town is a frequent stop for hikers en route to Kinabalu Park. It lies at the tripoint border of the districts of Kota Belud, Tuaran, and Ranau, and serves as a market hub for both locals and tourists. This town is also one of the West Coast Division towns that provided good strategic economic locations in terms of neighboring towns diplomatic & community relations.

== Geography ==
Pekan Nabalu is situated within the Crocker Mountains near the foothills of Mount Kinabalu, the highest mountain in Malaysia and Borneo. Located 12 kilometres from Kinabalu Park and right in the middle of the West Coast Division of Sabah (become the reason the town called the Heart of the West Coast Division), Pekan Nabalu is a popular resting point for tourists making their way to the national park.

Administratively, Pekan Nabalu is a mukim (township) of Kota Belud District in Sabah, located along Kota Belud District's tripoint border with the other districts of Tuaran and Ranau.

== History ==
The origin of the name "Nabalu" for this town is taken from the name of the Nabalu flower which grows in the forests and hills surrounding this town.

Tunku Azizah Aminah Maimunah Iskandariah, the 16th queen consort of Malaysia, visited the town on 5 September 2023 as part of the 2,154-kilometre royal tour "Travel to Discover Borneo".

== Demographics ==
Historical population
Year	Pop.	±%
1991	168	—
2000	280	+66.7%
2010	776	+177.1%
2020	8,188	+955.2%
2025	8,290	+1.2%

According to the last census in 2020, the population of Pekan Nabalu is estimated to have a population of around 8,188 with the majority of the population being Kadazan-Dusun who are Christian with a percentage of 90% and a minority of Kadazan-Dusun who are Muslim with a percentage of 10% of the population.

== Economy ==
Agriculture, handicrafts, and textiles are the main sources of income for the residents of the town. Tourism is another important source of income; the Nabalu Weekly Market is visited by locals and tourists alike for food and drink before the trek to Mount Kinabalu. There are also several restaurants in Pekan Nabalu with a view of Mount Kinabalu. In 2023, Joniston Bangkuai, Sabah's assistant tourism, culture and environment minister, proposed starting a pineapple and fruits festival in Pekan Nabalu to promote the area's local producers and agrotourism.

== Education & Sports ==
The primary school SK Dalas, Kota Belud is located near Pekan Nabalu and is the main educational facility serving the residents of Pekan Nabalu locally.
