= Pintasan =

State constituency in Sabah, Malaysia

Pintasan (N08)
Sabah constituency

State constituency
- Legislature: Sabah State Legislative Assembly
MLA
Fairuz Renddan
Independent
- Constituency created: 2019
- First contested: 2020
- Last contested: 2025

Demographics
- Electors (2025): 15,896

Pintasan is a state constituency in Sabah, Malaysia, that is represented in the Sabah State Legislative Assembly. This is one of the thirteen new state constituencies as result of approval from state legislative and Dewan Rakyat on 17 July 2019 and presenting for the first time for snap election

== Demographics ==
As of 2020, Pintasan has a population of 19,371 people.

Ethnic breakdown of Pintasan's electorate as of 2025
1. Muslim Bumiputera (76.0%)
2. Non-Muslim Bumiputera (23.8%)
3. Chinese (0.20%)
4. Other ethnicities (0.00%)

== History ==
=== Polling districts ===
According to the gazette issued on 31 October 2022, the Pintasan constituency has a total of 10 polling districts.

State constituency	Polling Districts	Code	Location
Pintasan（N08）	Dudar	169/08/01	SK Dudar
Pintasan（N08）	Rampayan	169/08/02	SK Nanamun
Pintasan（N08）	Timbang	169/08/03	SK Timbang
Pintasan（N08）	Tamau	169/08/04	SK Tamau
Pintasan（N08）	Merbau	169/08/05	SA Negeri Merabau Kota Belud
Pintasan（N08）	Pandasan	169/08/06	SK Pandasan
Pintasan（N08）	Kota Peladok	169/08/07	Dewan Serba Guna Kota Peladok
Pintasan（N08）	Rampayan Ulu	169/08/08	SK Rampayan Ulu
Pintasan（N08）	Pulau Mantani	169/08/09	SK Pulau Mantanani
Pintasan（N08）	Peladok	169/08/10	SK Peladok

=== Representation history ===
Members of the Legislative Assembly for Pintasan
Assembly	No	Years	Member	Party
Constituency created from Tempasuk and Usukan
16th	N08	2020–2022	Fairuz Renddan	GRS (BERSATU)
16th	N08	2022-2023	Fairuz Renddan	GRS (Direct)
16th	N08	2023–2025	Fairuz Renddan	GRS (GAGASAN)
17th	N08	2025–present	Fairuz Renddan	Independent

== Election results ==
Sabah state election, 2025: Pintasan
Party	Candidate	Votes	%	∆%
Independent	Fairuz Renddan	4,675	39.32	▲39.32
GRS	Pandikar Amin Mulia	3,605	30.32	▲30.32
Heritage	Abdullah Otong	1,167	9.81	▲11.82
BN	Tadzul Radim	1,024	8.61	▲8.61
KDM	Almudin Kaida	365	3.07	▲3.07
Independent	Tajuddin Padis	356	2.99	▲2.99
Homeland Solidarity Party	Raplin Samat	210	1.77	▲1.77
PN	Awang Salleh Makmud	196	1.65	▼31.04
Independent	Mohd Rizal Saiman	116	0.98	▲0.98
Independent	Syarif Mohd Shukree Danchingan	102	0.86	▲0.86
Sabah Dream Party	Lomog Rudin	75	0.63	▲0.63
Total valid votes		11,891		
Total rejected ballots		139		
Unreturned ballots		10		
Turnout		12,040	74.89	▼0.92
Registered electors		15,896		
Majority		1,070	9.00	▲8.00
Independent gain from PN		Swing		?
Source(s) "RESULTS OF CONTESTED ELECTION AND STATEMENTS OF THE POLL AFTER THE OFFICIAL ADDITION OF VOTES" (PDF).

Sabah state election, 2020: Pintasan
Party	Candidate	Votes	%
PN	Fairuz Renddan	2,744	32.69
USNO (Baru)	Pandikar Amin Mulia	2,660	31.69
Sabah Heritage Party	Mohd Safian Saludin	1,816	21.63
Independent	Almudin Kaida	780	9.29
Love Sabah Party	Padlan Samad	188	2.24
Sabah People's Unity Party	Roslan Mayahman	50	0.60
Total valid votes		8,238	98.13
Total rejected ballots		138	1.64
Unreturned ballots		19	0.22
Turnout		8,395	75.81
Registered electors		10,867	
Majority		84	1.00
This was a new constituency created.
Source(s) "RESULTS OF CONTESTED ELECTION AND STATEMENTS OF THE POLL AFTER THE OFFICIAL ADDITION OF VOTES".
