= Mohd Arsad Bistari =

Malaysian politician (born 1976)

Yang Berhormat Datuk Mohd Arsad Bistari PGDK MLA
- محمد أرسد بيستاري

Member of the Sabah State Legislative Assembly for Tempasuk
- Incumbent
- Assumed office 26 September 2020
- Preceded by: Musbah Jamli (BN–UMNO)
- Majority: 1,685 (2020); 1,821 (2025)

Personal details
- Born: Mohd Arsad bin Bistari; 19 August 1976 (age 50) Taun Gusi village, Kota Belud, Sabah, Malaysia
- Citizenship: Malaysia
- Party: United Malays National Organisation of Sabah (Sabah UMNO) (until 2023); Parti Gagasan Rakyat Sabah (GAGASAN) (since 2023)
- Other political affiliations: Barisan Nasional (BN) (until 2023); Gabungan Rakyat Sabah (GRS) (since 2023)
- Education: Asia University
- Occupation: Politician
- Website: https://arsadbistari.com

Mohd Arsad bin Bistari (born 19 August 1976) is a Malaysian politician and who has served as the Member of the Sabah State Legislative Assembly (MLA) for Tempasuk since September 2020. He is an official member of the Parti Gagasan Rakyat Sabah (GAGASAN), a component party of the Gabungan Rakyat Sabah (GRS) coalition and formerly a member of the United Malays National Organisation of Sabah (Sabah UMNO), a branch of a component party of the Barisan Nasional (BN) coalition. He was expelled from Sabah UMNO before joining GAGASAN Party on 21 February 2023.

== Election results ==
Sabah State Legislative Assembly
Year	Constituency	Candidate	Votes	Pct.	Opponent(s)	Votes	Pct.	Ballots cast	Majority	Turnout
2020	N09 Tempasuk	Mohd Arsad Bistari (Sabah UMNO)	4,040	44.28%	Musbah Jamli (IND)	2,355	25.81%	9,124	1,685	76.06%
2020	N09 Tempasuk	Mohd Arsad Bistari (Sabah UMNO)	4,040	44.28%	Mustapha Sakmud (PKR)	1,852	20.30%	9,124	1,685	76.06%
2020	N09 Tempasuk	Mohd Arsad Bistari (Sabah UMNO)	4,040	44.28%	Amza @ Hamzah Sundang (USNO Baru)	471	5.16%	9,124	1,685	76.06%
2020	N09 Tempasuk	Mohd Arsad Bistari (Sabah UMNO)	4,040	44.28%	Abdul Alif Saibeh (PCS)	133	1.46%	9,124	1,685	76.06%
2020	N09 Tempasuk	Mohd Arsad Bistari (Sabah UMNO)	4,040	44.28%	Kanul Gindol (GAGASAN)	57	0.62%	9,124	1,685	76.06%
2025	N09 Tempasuk	Mohd Arsad Bistari (GAGASAN)	4,914	39.79%	Azuwan Marjan @ Norjan (Sabah UMNO)	3,093	25.04%	12,489	1,821	73.12%
2025	N09 Tempasuk	Mohd Arsad Bistari (GAGASAN)	4,914	39.79%	Mohd Khidir Lamsil (WARISAN)	2,392	19.37%	12,489	1,821	73.12%
2025	N09 Tempasuk	Mohd Arsad Bistari (GAGASAN)	4,914	39.79%	Walter Mark Mukis (STAR)	1,275	10.32%	12,489	1,821	73.12%
2025	N09 Tempasuk	Mohd Arsad Bistari (GAGASAN)	4,914	39.79%	John Samud (KDM)	369	2.99%	12,489	1,821	73.12%
2025	N09 Tempasuk	Mohd Arsad Bistari (GAGASAN)	4,914	39.79%	Rimin Maun (PKS)	190	1.54%	12,489	1,821	73.12%
2025	N09 Tempasuk	Mohd Arsad Bistari (GAGASAN)	4,914	39.79%	Timuti Majitol (IMPIAN)	117	0.95%	12,489	1,821	73.12%

== Honours ==
- Sabah
  - Commander of the Order of Kinabalu (PGDK) – Datuk (2022)
  - Companion of the Order of Kinabalu (ASDK) (2017)
  - Grand Star of the Order of Kinabalu (BSK) (2015)
