= Kota Belud =

- Town and district capital
- Pekan Kota Belud; Kota Belud Town

Other transcription(s)
  - Jawi: كوتا بلود
  - Chinese: 古打毛律 (Simplified) 古打毛律 (Traditional); Gǔdǎ Máolǜ (Hanyu Pinyin); Kú-tá Mâu-lu̍t (Hakka Pha̍k-fa-sṳ)
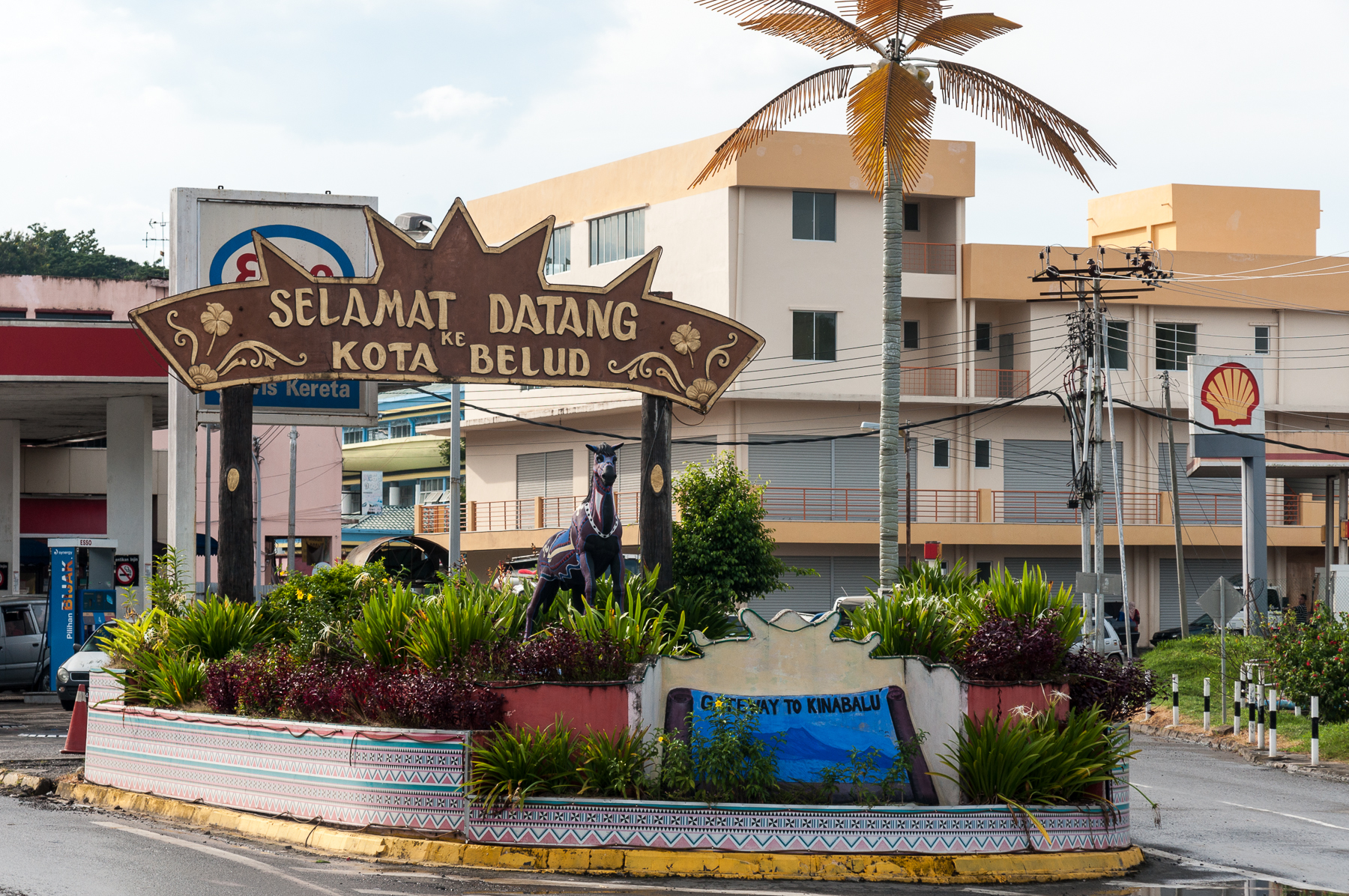
- Kota Belud

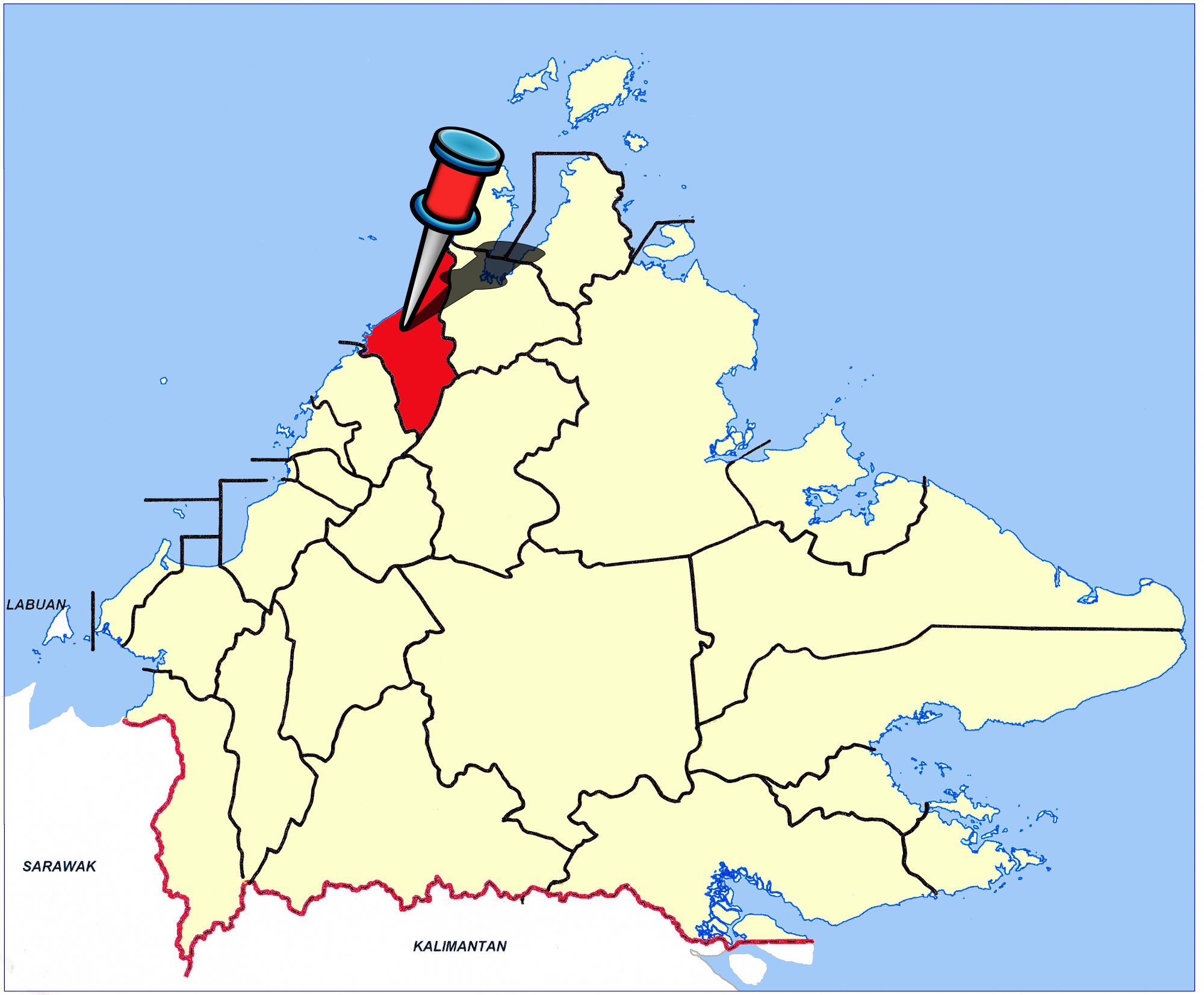
- Coordinates: 6°21′00″N 116°26′00″E
- Country: Malaysia
- State: Sabah
- Division: West Coast
- District: Kota Belud

Area
  - Total: 1,385.6 km^{2} (535.0 sq mi)

Population (2010)
  - Total: 8,392
- Tamu (Weekly Market): Sunday

Kota Belud (Malay: Pekan Kota Belud) is the capital of the Kota Belud District in the West Coast Division of Sabah, Malaysia. Its population was estimated to be around 8,392 in 2010. It is roughly at the midpoint of the federal highway connecting the state capital, Kota Kinabalu, and Kudat, near the northern tip of Sabah. The town is considered as the unofficial capital and gateway to the heartland of the West Coast Bajau people.

Kota Belud's population is divided between the Bajau-Sama (including Illanun) and Dusun peoples. There is a Chinese minority, which consists mainly of Hakkas. It is noted for its open air market, or tamu, which is held every Sunday. Once a year, the tamu is held on a much larger scale. During this time, it is known as the Tamu Besar or Grand Market.

A 520 feet (160 m) bailey bridge was opened on 12 November 1962, following three months of construction. It was opened by Governor William Goode.

== Gallery ==
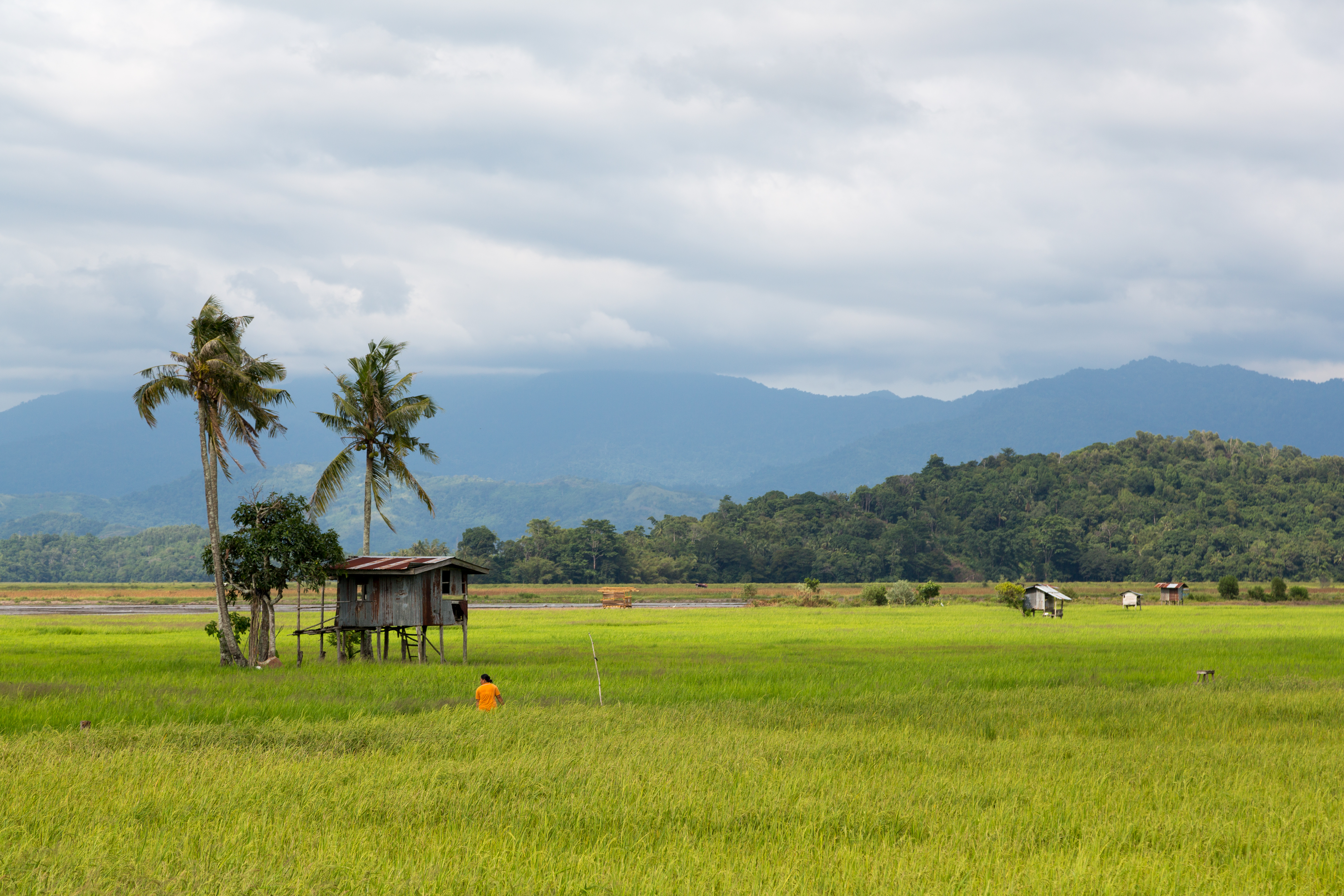
A paddy field in Kota Belud.

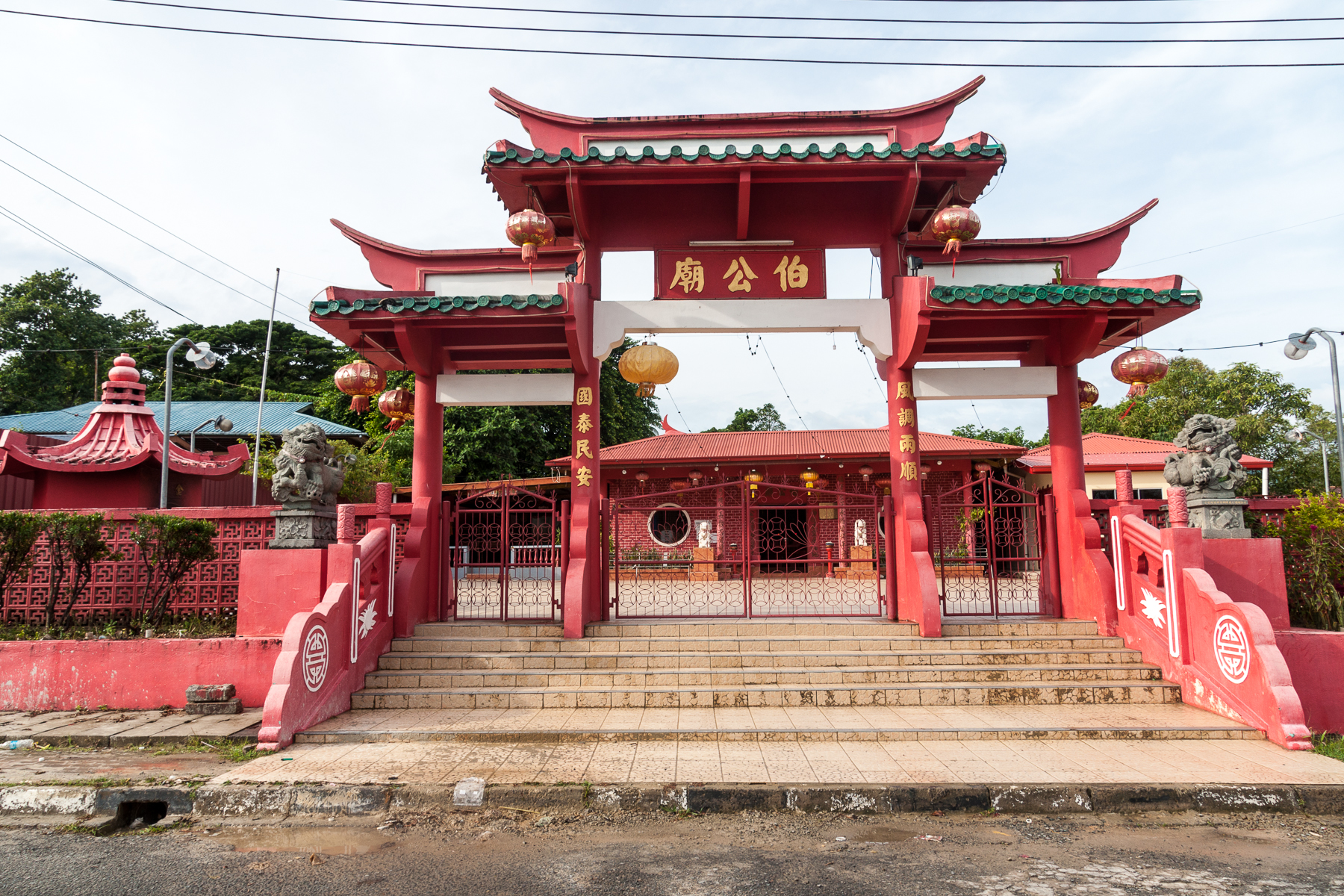
A Taoist temple in Kota Belud.

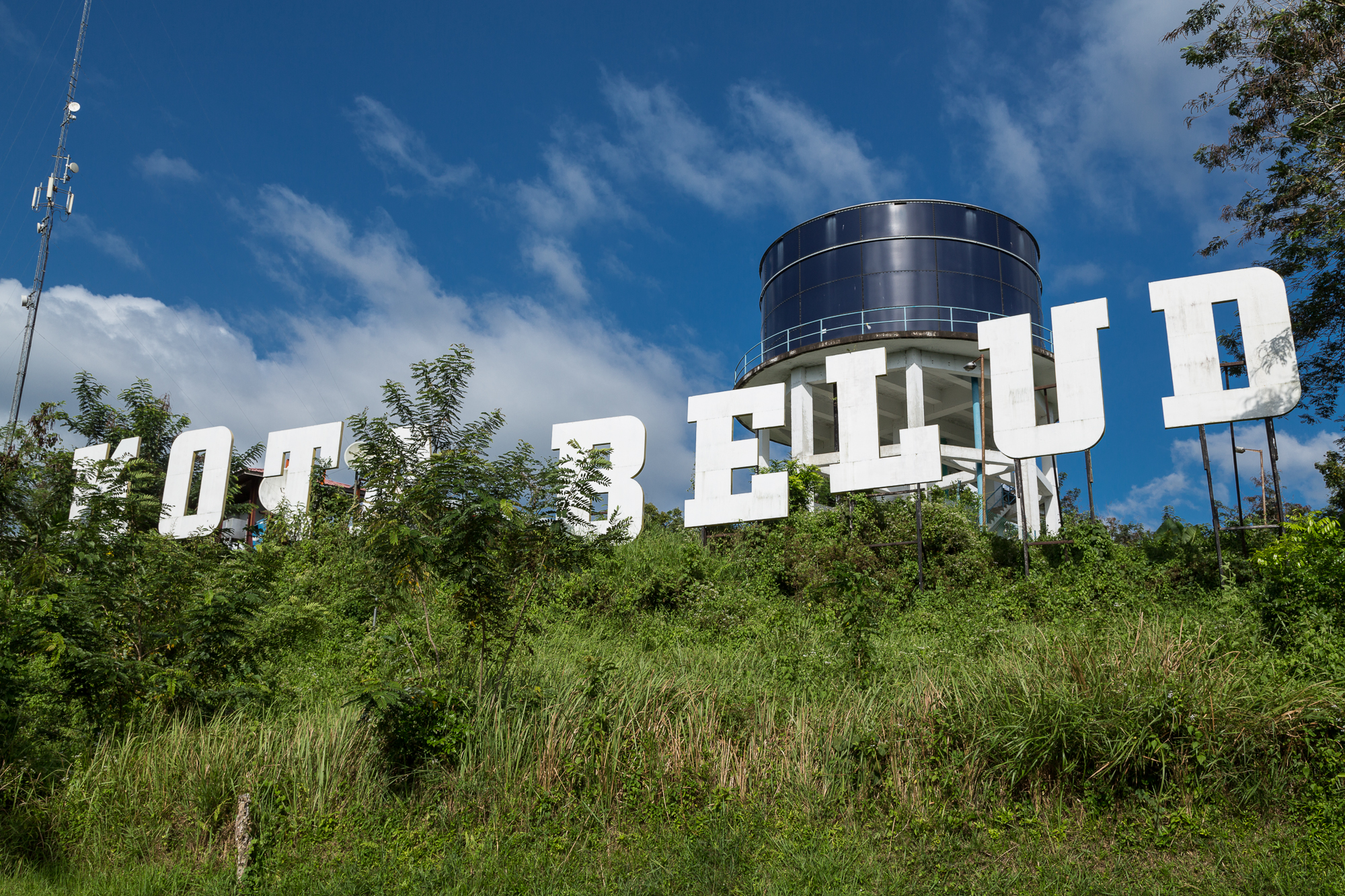
Kota Belud town sign on a hill.

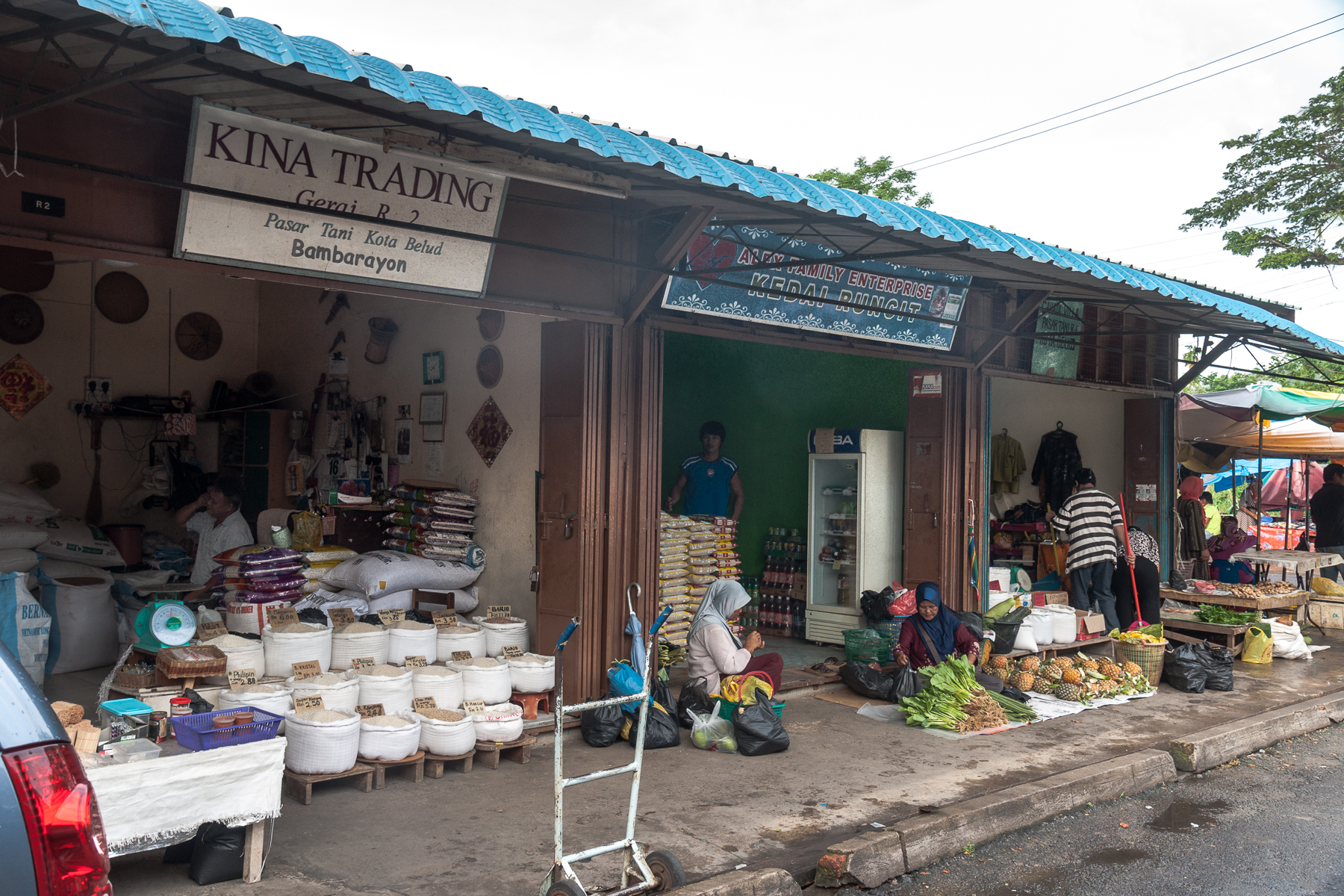
Market in Kota Belud.
