= Tempasuk =

Malaysian political subdivision

Tempasuk (N09)
Sabah constituency

State constituency
- Legislature: Sabah State Legislative Assembly
MLA
Mohd Arshad Bistari
GRS
- Constituency created: 1974
- First contested: 1976
- Last contested: 2025

Demographics
- Electors (2025): 17,116

Tempasuk is a state constituency in Sabah, Malaysia, that is represented in the Sabah State Legislative Assembly.

== Demographics ==
As of 2020, Tempasuk has a population of 20,188 people.

Ethnic breakdown of Tempasuk's electorate as of 2025
1. Muslim Bumiputera (65.0%)
2. Non-Muslim Bumiputera (34.0%)
3. Other ethnicities (0.91%)
4. Chinese (0.10%)

== History ==
=== Polling districts ===
According to the gazette issued on 31 October 2022, the Tempasuk constituency has a total of 7 polling districts.

State constituency	Polling Districts	Code	Location
Tempasuk (N09)	Kagurahan	169/09/01	SK Keguraan
Tempasuk (N09)	Taun Gusi	169/09/02	SK Taun Gusi
Tempasuk (N09)	Tempasuk	169/09/03	SK Tempasuk II
Tempasuk (N09)	Rosok	169/09/04	SK Rosok / Bengkahak Lama
Tempasuk (N09)	Gunding	169/09/05	SK Tampasuk I
Tempasuk (N09)	Jawi Jawi	169/09/06	SK Jawi-Jawi
Tempasuk (N09)	Labuan	169/09/07	SK Labuan

=== Representation history ===
Member of Sabah State Legislative Assembly for Tempasuk
Assembly	No	Years	Member	Party
Constituency created from Sorob
5th	N08	1976–1981	Ashkar Hasbollah	Alliance (USNO)
6th	N08	1981–1985	Mohamed Noor Mansoor	BN (BERJAYA)
7th	N07	1985–1986	Yahya Lampong	USNO
8th	N07	1986–1990	Robert Ripin Minggir	PBS
9th	N07	1990–1994	Robert Ripin Minggir	GR (PBS)
10th	N07	1994–1999	Pandikar Amin Mulia	BN (UMNO)
11th	N06	1999–2004	Musbah Jamli	BN (UMNO)
12th	N06	2004–2008	Pandikar Amin Mulia	BN (UMNO)
13th	N06	2008–2013	Musbah Jamli	BN (UMNO)
14th	N06	2013–2018	Musbah Jamli	BN (UMNO)
15th	N06	2018	Musbah Jamli	BN (UMNO)
15th	N06	2018–2019	Musbah Jamli	Independent
15th	N06	2019–2020	Musbah Jamli	WARISAN
15th	N06	2020	Musbah Jamli	Independent
16th	N09	2020–2023	Mohd Arsad Bistari	BN (UMNO)
16th	N09	2023–2025	Mohd Arsad Bistari	GRS (GAGASAN)
17th	N09	2025–present	Mohd Arsad Bistari	GRS (GAGASAN)

== Election results ==
Sabah state election, 2025: Tempasuk
Party	Candidate	Votes	%	∆%
GRS	Mohd Arsad Bistari	4,914	39.79	▲39.79
BN	Azwan Norjan	3,093	25.04	▼19.24
Heritage	Mohd Khidir Lamsil	2,392	19.37	▲19.37
Homeland Solidarity Party	Walter Mark Mukis	1,275	10.32	▲10.32
KDM	John Samud	369	2.99	▲2.99
Sabah Nationality Party	Rimin Maun	190	1.54	▲1.54
Sabah Dream Party	Timuti Majitol	117	0.95	▲0.95
Total valid votes		12,350		
Total rejected ballots		139		
Unreturned ballots		26		
Turnout		12,515	73.12	▼2.94
Registered electors		17,116		
Majority		1,821	14.75	▼3.72
GRS gain from BN		Swing		-
Source(s) "RESULTS OF CONTESTED ELECTION AND STATEMENTS OF THE POLL AFTER THE OFFICIAL ADDITION OF VOTES" (PDF).

Sabah state election, 2020: Tempasuk
Party	Candidate	Votes	%	∆%
BN	Mohd Arsad Bistari	4,040	44.28	▼4.95
Independent	Musbah Jamli	2,355	25.81	▲25.81
PKR	Mustapha Sakmud	1,852	20.30	▼14.53
USNO (Baru)	Amza @ Hamzah Sundang	471	5.16	▲5.16
Love Sabah Party	Abd Alif Saibeh	133	1.46	▲1.46
GAGASAN	Kanul Gindol	57	0.62	▲0.62
Total valid votes		8,909	97.64	
Total rejected ballots		179	1.96	
Unreturned ballots		37	0.40	
Turnout		9,124	76.06	▼6.15
Registered electors		11,996		
Majority		1,685	18.47	▲4.07
BN hold		Swing		
Source(s) "RESULTS OF CONTESTED ELECTION AND STATEMENTS OF THE POLL AFTER THE OFFICIAL ADDITION OF VOTES".

Sabah state election, 2018: Tempasuk
Party	Candidate	Votes	%	∆%
BN	Musbah Jamli	7,742	49.23	▼10.50
PKR	Mustapha Sakmud	5,478	34.83	▲34.83
STAR	Suwah Bulleh	1,494	9.50	▼2.94
PAS	Karim Deraman	521	3.31	▼19.79
Total valid votes		15,235	96.88	
Total rejected ballots		392	2.49	
Unreturned ballots		99	0.63	
Turnout		15,726	82.21	▼2.09
Registered electors		19,129		
Majority		2,264	14.40	▼22.23
BN hold		Swing		
Source(s) "RESULTS OF CONTESTED ELECTION AND STATEMENTS OF THE POLL AFTER THE OFFICIAL ADDITION OF VOTES".

Sabah state election, 2013: Tempasuk
Party	Candidate	Votes	%	∆%
BN	Musbah Jamli	8,495	59.73	▲1.16
PAS	Laimin Ikin	3,285	23.10	▲23.10
STAR	Suwah Bulleh	1,769	12.44	▲12.44
SAPP	Abdul Malik Mohed	319	2.24	▲2.24
Total valid votes		13,868	97.51	
Total rejected ballots		325	2.29	
Unreturned ballots		29	0.20	
Turnout		14,222	84.30	▲6.16
Registered electors		16,866		
Majority		5,210	36.63	▲14.86
BN hold		Swing		
Source(s) "KEPUTUSAN PILIHAN RAYA UMUM DEWAN UNDANGAN NEGERI". Archived from the original on 2022-06-19.

Sabah state election, 2008: Tempasuk
Party	Candidate	Votes	%	∆%
BN	Musbah Jamli	6,541	58.57	▲1.82
PKR	Laimin Ikin	4,109	36.80	▲36.80
Independent	Ibrahim Linggam	191	1.71	▲1.71
Total valid votes		10,841	97.08	
Total rejected ballots		324	2.90	
Unreturned ballots		2	0.02	
Turnout		11,167	78.14	▲1.89
Registered electors		14,291		
Majority		2,432	21.77	▼10.53
BN hold		Swing		
Source(s) "KEPUTUSAN PILIHAN RAYA UMUM DEWAN UNDANGAN NEGERI SABAH BAGI TAHUN 2008".

Sabah state election, 2004: Tempasuk
Party	Candidate	Votes	%	∆%
BN	Pandikar Amin Mulia	6,044	56.75	▲7.28
Independent	Digong Abdul Rashid	2,604	24.45	▲24.45
BERSEKUTU	Josli Padis	916	8.60	▲4.89
PAS	Bandira Sialang @ Bandira Alang	426	4.00	▲1.59
Independent	Razak Rakunman	296	2.78	▲2.78
Total valid votes		10,286	96.58	
Total rejected ballots		306	2.87	
Unreturned ballots		58	0.54	
Turnout		10,650	76.25	▼4.86
Registered electors		13,968		
Majority		3,440	32.30	▲24.90
BN hold		Swing		
Source(s) "KEPUTUSAN PILIHAN RAYA UMUM DEWAN UNDANGAN NEGERI SABAH BAGI TAHUN 2004".

Sabah state election, 1999: Tempasuk
Party	Candidate	Votes	%	∆%
BN	Musbah Jamli	4,911	49.47	▲0.59
PBS	Abdul Salam Gibang	4,176	42.07	▲4.37
BERSEKUTU	Ibrahim Linggam	368	3.71	▲3.71
PAS	Mohd Aminuddin Aling	239	2.41	▲2.41
Independent	Dausin Pangalin	61	0.61	▲0.61
SETIA	Masud Nanang	38	0.38	▲0.38
Total valid votes		9,793	98.65	
Total rejected ballots		134	1.35	
Unreturned ballots		0	0.00	
Turnout		9,927	81.11	▲3.07
Registered electors		12,239		
Majority		735	7.40	▼3.78
BN hold		Swing		
Source(s) "KEPUTUSAN PILIHAN RAYA UMUM DEWAN UNDANGAN NEGERI SABAH BAGI TAHUN 1999".

Sabah state election, 1994: Tempasuk
Party	Candidate	Votes	%	∆%
BN	Pandikar Amin Mulia	4,142	48.88	▲48.88
PBS	Dausin Pangalin	3,195	37.70	▲0.96
Independent	Suwah Buleh @ Bulleh	1,016	12.11	▲12.11
Total valid votes		8,353	98.57	
Total rejected ballots		121	1.43	
Unreturned ballots		0	0.00	
Turnout		8,474	78.04	▼4.15
Registered electors		10,858		
Majority		947	11.18	▲6.85
BN gain from PBS		Swing		?
Source(s) "KEPUTUSAN PILIHAN RAYA UMUM DEWAN UNDANGAN NEGERI SABAH BAGI TAHUN 1994".

Sabah state election, 1990: Tempasuk
Party	Candidate	Votes	%	∆%
PBS	Robert Ripin Minggir	2,915	36.74	▼15.79
USNO	Musbah Jamli	2,572	32.41	▼4.89
AKAR	Pandikar Amin Mulia	1,139	14.35	▲14.35
BERJAYA	Mohammad Noor Mansoor	1,089	13.72	▼6.94
PRS	Jumit Panau	105	1.32	▲1.32
Independent	Mukamad Abdullah	15	0.19	▲0.19
Total valid votes		7,835	98.74	
Total rejected ballots		100	1.26	
Unreturned ballots		0	0.00	
Turnout		7,935	82.19	▲2.85
Registered electors		9,655		
Majority		343	4.33	▼10.90
PBS hold		Swing		
Source(s) "KEPUTUSAN PILIHAN RAYA UMUM DEWAN UNDANGAN NEGERI SABAH BAGI TAHUN 1990".

Sabah state election, 1986: Tempasuk
Party	Candidate	Votes	%	∆%
PBS	Robert Ripin Minggir	2,869	41.34	▲19.01
USNO	Lamsil Amidsor	2,609	37.59	▲4.04
BERJAYA	Adam Sampoli	1,445	20.82	▲20.82
Independent	Santri Rakman @ San Luciana	17	0.24	▲0.24
Total valid votes		6,940	100.00	
Total rejected ballots		54		
Unreturned ballots		0		
Turnout		6,994	79.34	▼0.78
Registered electors		8,815		
Majority		260	3.75	▲2.59
PBS gain from USNO		Swing		?
Source(s) "KEPUTUSAN PILIHAN RAYA UMUM DEWAN UNDANGAN NEGERI SABAH BAGI TAHUN 1986".

Sabah state election, 1985: Tempasuk
Party	Candidate	Votes	%	∆%
USNO	Mohammad Yahya Lampong	2,141	33.55	▼4.40
BERJAYA	Mohd. Noor Mansoor	2,067	32.39	▼25.99
PBS	Robert Ripin Minggir	1,425	22.33	▲22.33
BERSIH	James Bagah	719	11.27	▲11.27
BERSEPADU	Mahsar Maidan	30	0.47	▲0.47
Total valid votes		6,382	100.00	
Total rejected ballots		63		
Unreturned ballots		0		
Turnout		6,445	80.12	▲0.06
Registered electors		8,044		
Majority		74	1.16	▼19.27
USNO gain from BN		Swing		-

Sabah state election, 1981: Tempasuk
Party	Candidate	Votes	%	∆%
BERJAYA	Mohd. Noor Mansoor	2,906	58.38	▲18.48
USNO	Askhar Hasbollah	1,889	37.95	▼9.29
PASOK	Naratine Sagidon	103	2.07	▲2.07
Independent	Abdul Mumin Mulia	80	1.61	▼0.20
Total valid votes		4,978	100.00	
Total rejected ballots		112		
Unreturned ballots		0		
Turnout		5,090	80.06	▼6.28
Registered electors		6,358		
Majority		1,017	20.43	▲13.09
BERJAYA gain from Alliance		Swing		-

Sabah state election, 1976: Tempasuk
Party	Candidate	Votes	%
USNO	Ashkar Hasbollah	1,853	47.23
BERJAYA	Mohd. Mansor Sani	1,565	39.89
PEKEMAS	Pinjaman Hassin	434	11.06
Independent	Mohamed Gelungan Omar	71	1.81
Total valid votes		3,923	100.00
Total rejected ballots		82	
Unreturned ballots		0	
Turnout		4,005	86.33
Registered electors		4,639	
Majority		288	7.34
This was a new constituency created
