= United Sabah National Organisation (New) =

United Sabah National Organisation (New) Pertubuhan Kebangsaan Sabah Bersatu (Baru)
- Abbreviation: USNO (Baru) (Note: Shown on the Election Commission website as USNO)
- President: Pandikar Amin Mulia
- Secretary-General: Juari Amit
- Deputy President: Ibrahim Linggam
- Women Chief: Hadijah Teng Abdullah
- Founder: Dulli Tiaseh
- Founded: 2 September 2013
- Split from: United Malays National Organisation (UMNO)
- Preceded by: United Sabah National Organisation (Old)
- Ideology: National conservatism Regionalism
- National affiliation: National Unity Government (since 2022) (Note: The party was part of the United Borneo Alliance (2013-2015) and Gabungan Rakyat Sabah (2021-2026))
- Colours: White, green, red, blue
- Dewan Negara: 0 / 70
- Dewan Rakyat: 0 / 26 (Sabah and Labuan seats)
- Sabah State Legislative Assembly: 0 / 79

Election symbol

Party flag

Website
- United Sabah National Organisation on Facebook

The United Sabah National Organisation (New) (Malay: Parti Pertubuhan Kebangsaan Sabah Bersatu (Baru); abbrev: USNO (Baru) (Note: Shown on the Election Commission website as USNO)) is a political party in Sabah, Malaysia. The party was formed in 2013 with the aim of reviving the long-buried struggle of USNO (Lama). The establishment of the new USNO Party was inspired by the struggle of Tun Mustapha Harun from the dissolved old USNO party in favor of the peninsula-based UMNO.

The new United Sabah National Organisation (USNO Baru) was one of 20 new political parties approved nationwide by the Registrar of Societies (RoS) in 2013. It was the successor of the old United Sabah National Organisation (USNO), founded by Sabah's third chief minister and first governor Tun Datu Mustapha Harun in 1961 and deregistered by the RoS in 1996.

== Leadership ==
Ibrahim Linggam was elected as party president in November 2018, replacing pro tem president Dulli Tiaseh and its office-bearers, ending five years of hiatus due to an internal squabble over who among three of its leaders should be president since the revived party's inception in 2013.

The party contested in the 2020 state elections, failing to win a single seat.

Former national parliament Speaker Pandikar Amin Mulia was elected party president in February 2021.

== Affiliation ==
On 2021, USNO made an application to join the Gabungan Rakyat Sabah alliance.

On 9 May 2022, the United Sabah National Organisation (USNO) has been accepted as one of the new component parties of the Gabungan Rakyat Sabah coalition.

== Election results ==
Sabah State Legislative Assembly
Election	Votes		Seats			Position (Note: As part of electoral coalition.)	Status
Election	Count	%	Result	Won / contested	+/–	Position	Status
2018	147	0.0	0 / 60	0 / 2	Steady	9th	No seats
2020	8,815	1.2	0 / 73	0 / 47	Steady	▲5th	No seats
2025	5,326	0.5	0 / 73	0 / 2	Steady	▲1st (Gabungan Rakyat Sabah)	No seats

== See also ==
- Politics of Malaysia
- List of political parties in Malaysia
- United Sabah National Organisation (Old)
- Gabungan Rakyat Sabah Party (Registered political coalition)
