= Ranau District =

- District
- Daerah Ranau

Other transcription(s)
  - Jawi: داءيره راناو
  - Chinese: 兰瑙县 (Simplified) 蘭瑙縣 (Traditional); Lánnǎo xiàn (Hanyu Pinyin)
  - Tamil: ரானாவ் மாவட்டம் Rāṉāv māvaṭṭam (Transliteration)
  - Kadazandusun: Watas Ranau
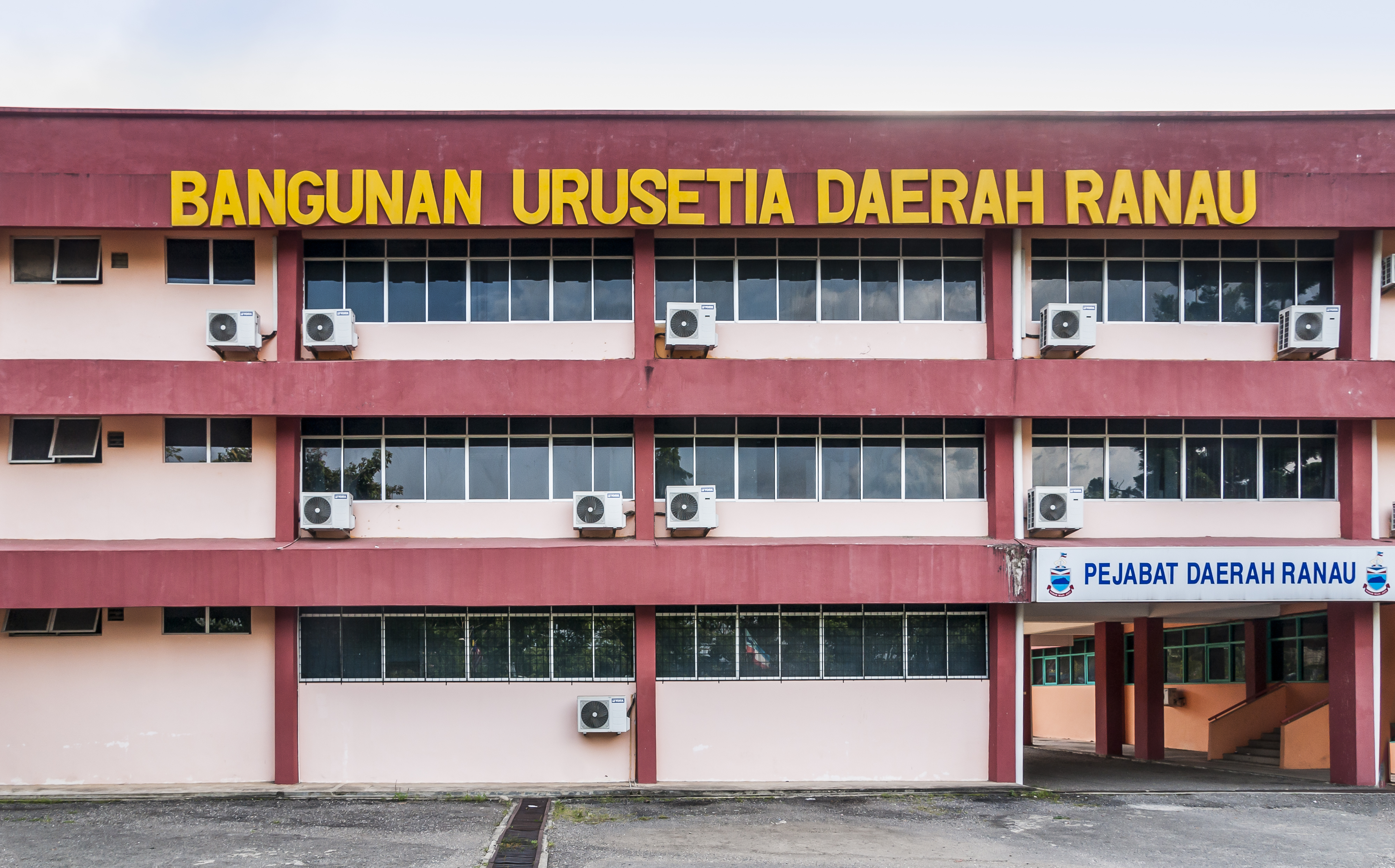
- Ranau District Office.

- Seal

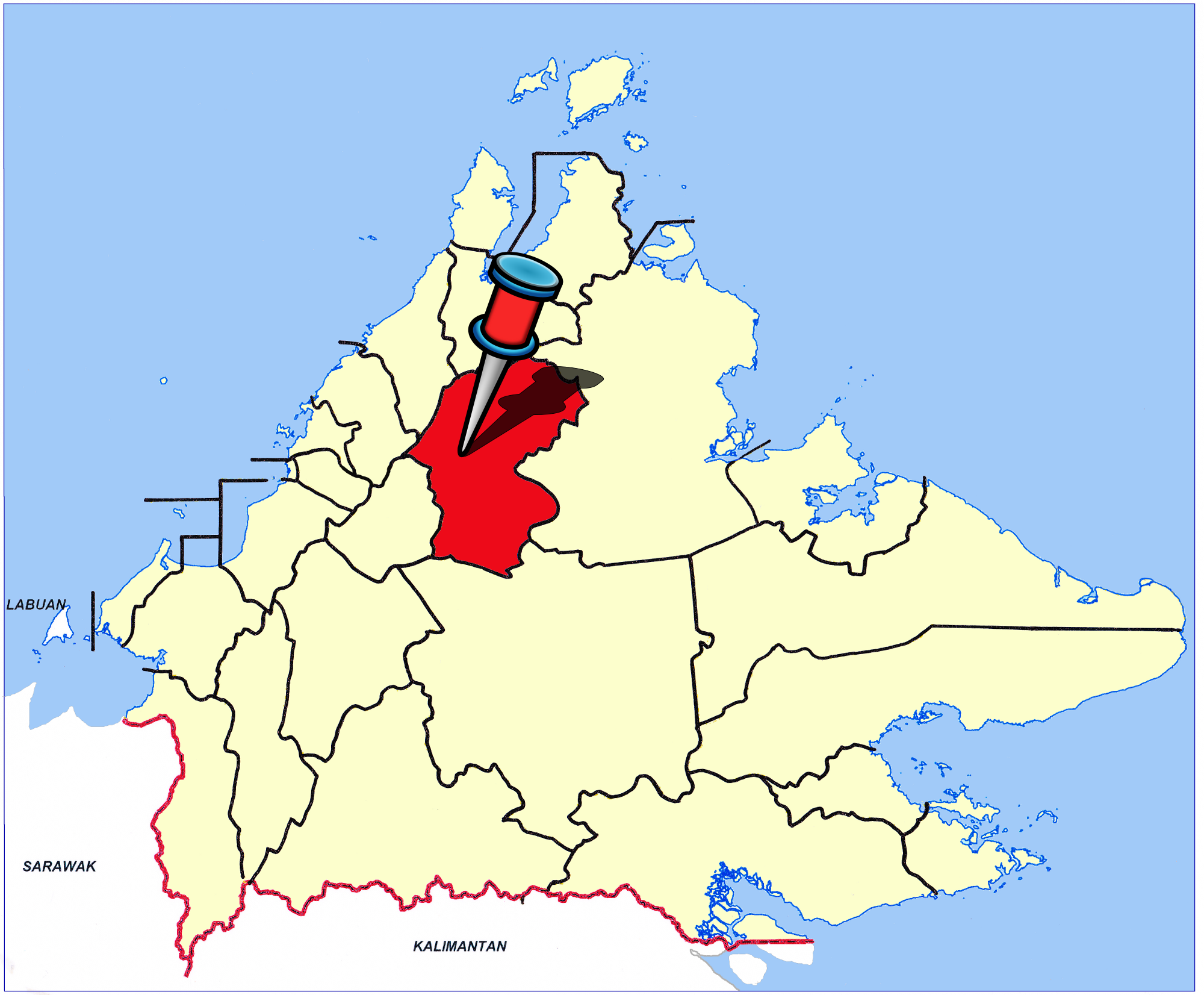
- Coordinates: 5°58′00″N 116°41′00″E
- Country: Malaysia
- State: Sabah
- Division: West Coast
- Capital: Ranau

Government
  - District Officer: Tinus Manggam

Area
  - Total: 3,608.51 km^{2} (1,393.25 sq mi)
- Elevation: 1,176 m (3,858 ft)

Population (2020)
  - Total: 85,077
- Website: mdranau.sbh.gov.my pdranau.sbh.gov.my

The Ranau District (Malay: Daerah Ranau) is an administrative district in the Malaysian state of Sabah, part of the West Coast Division which includes the districts of Kota Belud, Kota Kinabalu, Papar, Penampang, Putatan, Ranau and Tuaran.

The capital of the district is in Ranau Town. The landlocked district bordering the Sandakan Division to the east until it meets the Interior Division border. Ranau sits 108 km (67 mi) east of Kota Kinabalu and 227 km (141 mi) west of Sandakan. As of the 2010 Census, the population of the district was 94,092, an almost entirely Dusun ethnic community.

Ranau is noted for its hilly geographical structure and is the largest producer of highland vegetables in the state of Sabah. Tourism and highland agriculture are the major industries, as the district is at an altitude of 1,176 m above sea level. Its many tourist destinations attracted half a million tourists in 2009. These include Mount Kinabalu, Kinabalu Park, Poring Hot Springs, Kundasang War Memorial, Death March Trail, Mesilau, and Sabah Tea Garden. Ranau's diverse flora ranges from rich tropical lowland and hill rainforest to tropical mountain, sub-alpine forest and scrub on the higher elevations and particularly abundant in species with examples of flora from as far as China, Australia and the Himalayas, as well as pan-tropical flora.

Kinabalu Park has been recognised by UNESCO as a Centre of Plant Diversity for Southeast Asia. In December 2000, the Kinabalu Park was designated by UNESCO as Malaysia's first World Heritage Site.

Ranau was home to the largest mining project in Malaysia, the Mamut Copper Mine, before it ceased operations in 1999. At the peak of its mining activity, Ranau was transformed into a thriving township. The mining company constructed the Ranau Bridge across Liwagu River, the Ranau Golf Course, and also made donations to school building funds, buses, and bus shelters.

== History ==
=== Toponymy ===
The origin of the name "Ranau" comes from the Dusun word ranahon, which means paddy fields. The Dusun people who live in the highland grow mountain rice on the hills (called tumo/dumo), where the mountain rice is called parai tidong in Dusun. The people in the lowlands of Ranau use traditional water-filled paddy fields for rice cultivation. Over time, "Ranahon" was shortened to "Ranau." As the central district administration is nearer to the lowland, the name "Ranau" was adopted as the official name for the district.

=== Early references ===
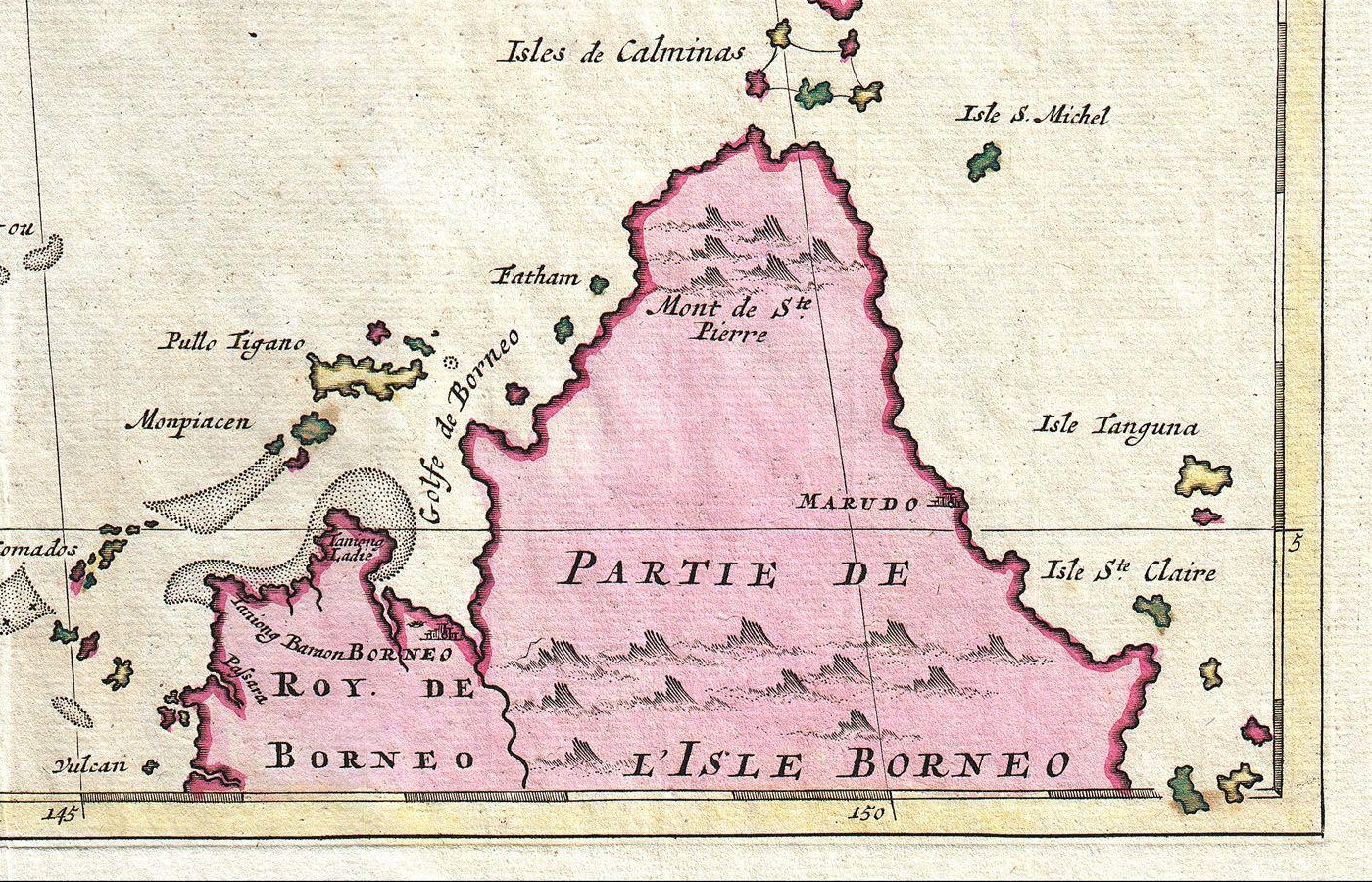
Mount Kinabalu was called Mont de Ste. Pierre in this 1710 Ottens map.

Allusions to a place in Ranau, the Mount Kinabalu, had appeared in sources from China. Wang Dayuan mentioned a mountain called Long shan when he described the country of Bo ni (勃泥 bó ní) in his book, Description of the Barbarians of the Isles (島夷誌略 dǎo yí zhì lüè) written between 1330 and 1350. Long shan (龍山 lóng shān) means Dragon Mountain and it was linked to Mount Kinabalu because there were dragon legends associated with Kinabalu. Another Chinese source, a nautical compendium called Fair Winds for Escort (順風相送 shùn fēng xiāng sòng) composed circa 1430, described a voyage from Siam to Mindanao via the west coast of Borneo, where the Chinese ships passed Sheng shan (聖山 shèng shān). Sheng shan which means Holy Mountain, was identified as Mount Kinabalu.

References to Mount Kinabalu had also appeared in old maps of the East Indies made by Europeans cartographers under the names of Mount St. Pedro or Mount St. Pierre. The name Mount St. Pedro was used by map makers such as Gerardus Mercator in his India Orientalis map published around 1595, Nicolaes Visscher II in Indiae Orientalis map published in the early 17th century, and several other cartographers. In some maps, for example, the 1710 Ottens's Map of Southeast Asia by Joachim Ottens, the mountain was called Mount St. Pierre. However, John Pinkerton's East India Isles map from 1818 labelled the mountain as St. Peter's Mountain.

Old geographers believed that there was a great lake at the peak of the mountain on account of the natives's stories. During the Ice age about 100,000 years ago, the mountain was covered with ice sheets and glaciers moved slowly down its slopes. Only the summit peaks were very noticeable above the ice. The natives's oral history may have had its roots from the folk memory of these glistening sheets of ice. However, the earliest documented expeditions to ascend Kinabalu in March 1851 and in 1858, led by Sir Hugh Low and Sir Spenser St. John, revealed that there was no lake.

Later maps, as evident in the maps by Archibald Fullarton & Co. and J. Rapkin, suggested that a lake existed south of the mountain. With further assertions from the Kiau people (of Kota Belud district) that they had done trading business with villagers who lived near the lake shore, St. John viewed that the lake had probably existed southeast below Kinabalu, where the Ranau plain is situated today. The Dusun word ranahon (ranau) is used to describe a wet field of lowland rice and it was plausible that floods had submerged the plain, thus giving a lake-like view when seen from the highlands. Notwithstanding, explorers William B. Pryer and Captain Francis Xavier Witti concluded that there was no lake near Mount Kinabalu when they explored the Ranau plain in the early days.

=== Under British North Borneo Company ===
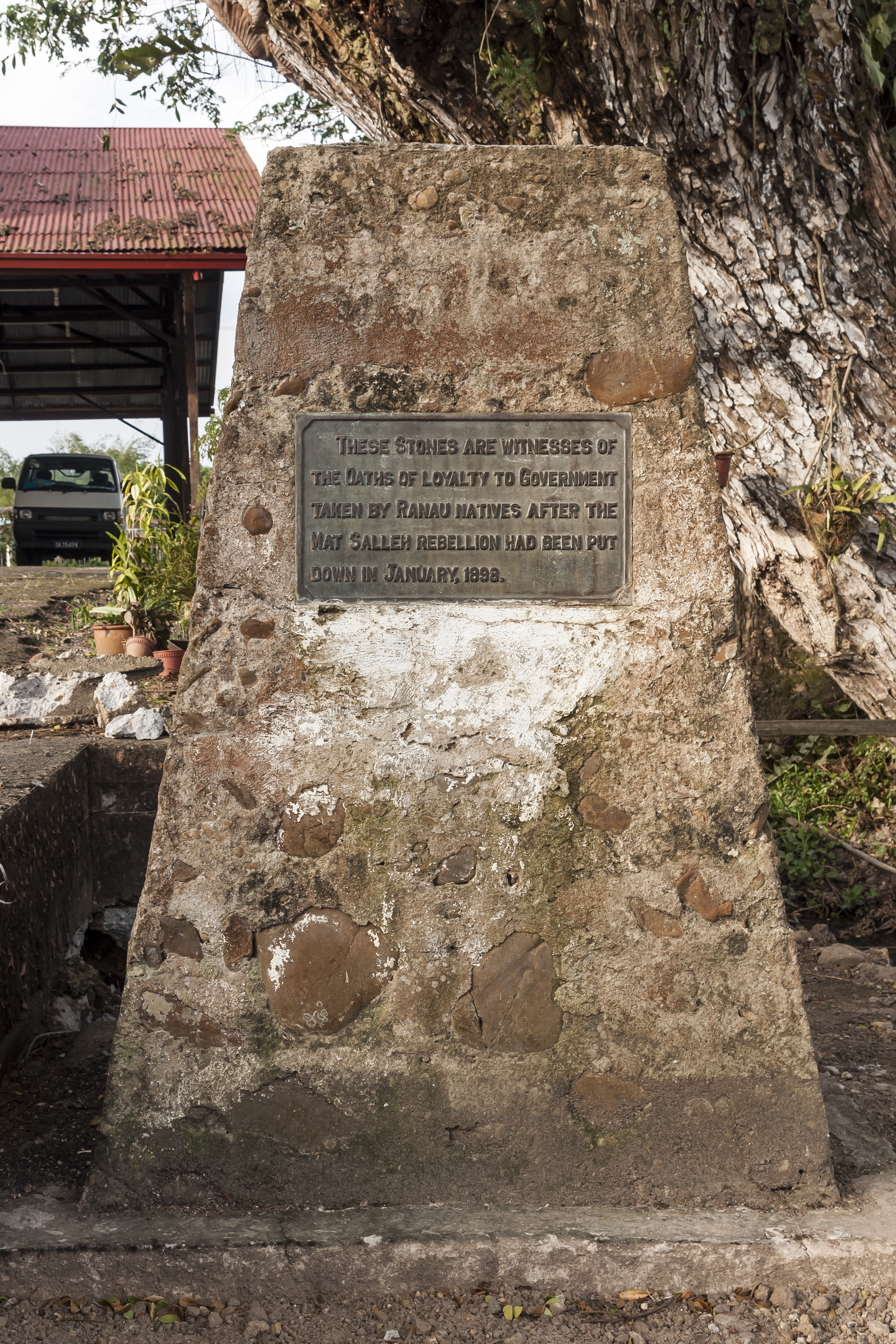
"These stones are witnesses of the oaths of loyalty to Government taken by Ranau natives after the Mat Salleh rebellion had been put down in January 1898." —Ranau Loyalty Oath Stone

During the British North Borneo Company administration beginning in the 19th century, Ranau was governed under the Province Dent. Later it organised as a substation of Tambunan with a Government station under the Interior Residency. Ranau was connected to the West Coast Residency only by a bridle road and by a southerly bridle path 64 km (40 mi) to Tambunan. Telegraph line was also available from Ranau to Tambunan.

The Ranau plain and its surrounding hilly areas were historically inhabited by Dusun farmers who practised shifting cultivation. Their major staple crops were upland rice and lowland wet rice. Natives from Ranau would go to large tamu (native market) at nearby districts to sell and buy, or exchange goods using the barter system. Tobacco, a major export item for the company, was successfully cultivated in extensive parts of Ranau district, especially in the highlands. It became an important source of income for Ranau natives. At that time, the tobacco produced from highland Ranau and the Interior proper was of high quality compared to that grown down the coast due to the effect of sea wind even though the plants were similarly obtained from Ranau, according to natives and experts.

Between 1897 and 1898, Mat Salleh built a fort in Ranau and went there three times during his rebellion against the British North Borneo Company. His fort in Ranau was measured at 109 m (119 yd) long and 55 m (60 yd) wide. There was a three-sided strong-point on one side and a watch-tower in the middle. The fort was surrounded by a thick earth wall with high strong fence. Sharp bamboo stakes were thickly sown into the grounds around the fort. His first appearance in Ranau on 10 February 1897, gained him many Dusun followers which then increased his influence to as far as Inanam. The company was aware of this development and launched an attack against his fort in Ranau on 23 February which led to the death of his father. Mat Salleh escaped but retreated back to Ranau in July the same year. After being tracked down by Captain J.M. Reddie and E.H. Barraut, Ranau was attacked again but he managed to escape. Mat Salleh's final movement to Ranau occurred in November 1897.

A total of 288 Sikh, Iban and Dayak policemen from Abai Bay and Sandakan led by G. Hewett, George Ormsby, P. Wise, and Adjutant Alfred Jones, were ordered to invade Mat Salleh's fort in Ranau on 13 December 1897. The fort was significantly destroyed but Jones and 13 other policemen were killed. On 9 January 1898, Hewett and his troops ambushed the Ranau fort again but it was already deserted by Mat Salleh and his followers. The fort was then completely demolished. As a result of this rebellion, the Company built an administration building in the district and erected a loyalty oath stone as a sign that the residents of Ranau swore loyalty to the Government. The loyalty oath stone still exists until today.

=== World War II ===
The Japanese occupation of North Borneo became official on 16 May 1942, and divided North Borneo into two governorates. Ranau was under the Governorate of the West Coast Territory (西海州 seikaishū) and was directly administered by a district officer (郡長 guncho) with the help of village headmen. Ranau was also a sub-district under the administration of Tambunan District at 1943 until 1947.

At first, the Japanese were not interested in the Interior Residency but soon, demands for the collection of foodstuffs increased. They also realised the importance of the Interior as part of their strategic forces. The Japanese set up a garrison in Ranau to control the local people and it was one of the strongest army posts in the Interior. Village headmen were given orders to gather as many groups of labourers as possible from villages all over the district to work on upgrading existing roads, mainly the one leading to Sandakan, and also to construct an airstrip in Ranau near a detention camp of Australian prisoners of war. Ranau served as an important junction for the Japanese troops from Sandakan heading to Jesselton and also for the troops from the Interior proper marching as reinforcements towards Kudat.

Towards the end of the war, Ranau stood witness to the infamous Sandakan Death Marches. The first march started in January 1945. 470 Australian prisoners of wars left Sandakan and by June, only 6 remained alive in Ranau. The second march of 536 prisoners began on 29 May 1945. Along the way, two prisoners managed to escape into the jungle and later saved by the Allied units with the help of locals. Only 183 prisoners reached the Ranau camp on 24 June 1945. Another four prisoners successfully fled the camp and led to safety by a native teenager who found them hiding in the jungle along a river. They were also rescued by Allied paratroopers later. In June 1945, the Japanese captors moved with the prisoners 8.3 km (5.2 mi) south of Ranau to a second jungle camp near the Kenipir River to escape from the air raids of napalm bombs by the Allied planes. By August 1945, all survivors of the marches were killed.

In early 1960s, Ranau was a small area for both the Tambunan and Kota Belud District before the year 1961, Ranau has become a district.

Three memorials were erected in remembrance of the marches. The Ranau Memorial, also known as the Gunner Cleary Memorial, was constructed in 1985 in memory of the tragic death of Gunner Albert Neil Cleary from the first Death March. The Kundasang War Memorial built in 1962 is a memorial park dedicated to the Australian and British servicemen who died in Sandakan and on the marches, and also to the locals who assisted the prisoners of wars. The Last Camp Memorial was newly unveiled in 2009 in remembrance of the exact spot where the Death March ended.

=== Mamut Copper Mine ===
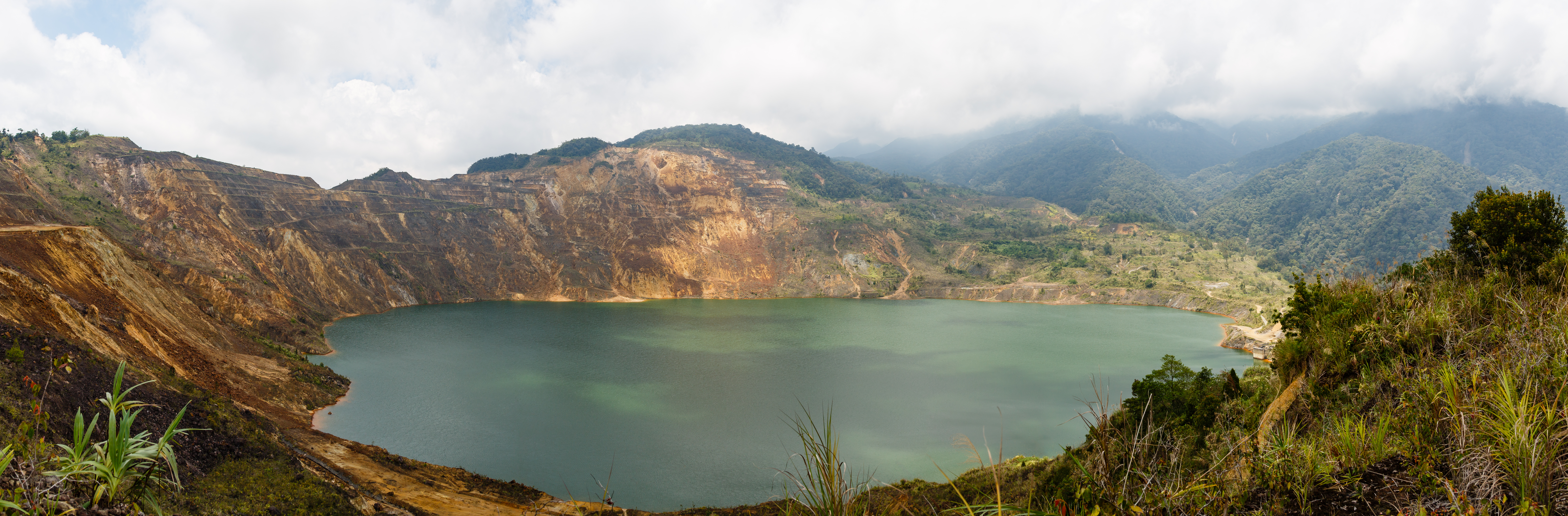
The crater lake of the former Mamut Copper Mine.

Ranau was the centre of Malaysian copper, gold and silver mining from 1975 to 1999. The Mamut Copper Mine at the slopes of Mount Kinabalu was an open cast mine which was operated by a joint venture of Japanese and Malaysian investors under the Overseas Mineral Resources Development Sabah Sdn Bhd, later restructured under the name Mamut Copper Mining Sdn Bhd. (MCM). During the 25 years of operation, the Mamut Copper Mine was responsible for 50% of the gold and 90% of the silver production in Malaysia. In its booming years, MCM was mining an annual production of 25,000 tons of copper in Ranau. Operations were discontinued in 1999, leaving a crater of 1,200 meters diameter and a depth of 500 meters. Filled with water, the crater now forms a huge lake, which - together with the heavy metal legacies of the Lohan Tailings Dam - made the headlines of several reports on environmental contamination.

=== 2015 earthquake ===
On 5 June 2015, an earthquake measuring at 6.0 on the Richter magnitude scale occurred at 7:15 a.m. MST with its epicentre approximately 15 km north of Ranau. Mount Kinabalu was closest to the epicentre and was affected by massive landslides causing eighteen people to lose their lives, three of which were from Ranau. Another 137 climbers were stranded on the mountain but they were eventually rescued. It was the strongest earthquake to occur in Malaysia since 1976. Following the earthquake, there were reports of damage to the structures of the Ar-Rahman Mosque, fifteen primary schools and eight secondary schools in Ranau.

== Geography ==
Ranau is situated between 5°30'N to 6°25'N and 116°30'E to 117°5'E. The district, with a total area of 3,555.51 km^{2} (1,372.79 sq mi), is surrounded entirely by Kota Marudu to the north, Kota Belud to the northeast, Tuaran to the west, Tambunan to the southwest, Keningau to the south, Tongod to the southeast, and Beluran to the east. The northern part of Ranau is bounded by the Crocker Range and the Pinousok summit which runs in a southwesterly direction, to the east lies the Ranau plain and Trus Madi Range while the southern part is bounded by the Labuk highlands. Laconically, Ranau's geography is characterised by undulating lands at most areas with a valley plain.

== Demographics ==
Ranau Demographics
2010 Census	Ranau proper	Kundasang	Remainder of Ranau district
Total population	8,970	5,008	80,114
Kadazan-Dusun	6,487	3,457	70,230
Malay	352	129	479
Bajau	250	143	696
Murut	37	7	97
Other Bumiputera	764	188	2,807
Chinese	670	133	718
Indians	24	3	32
Others	98	74	548
Non-Malaysian citizens	288	856	4,513

Population by year
Year	Population	%±
2000	70,649	-
2010	94,092	+33.2

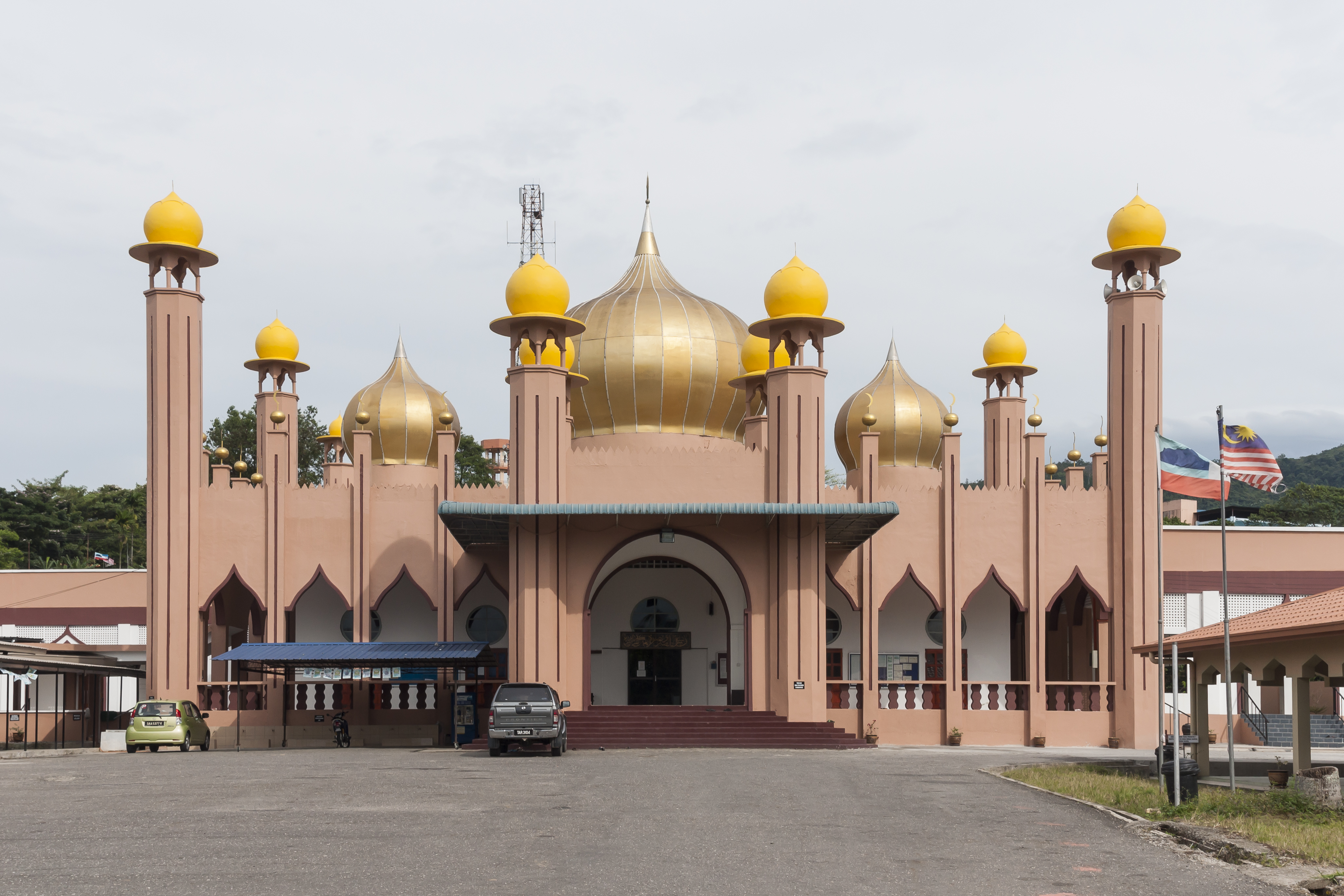
The old front façade of the Ar-Rahman Mosque. The mosque is currently being rebuilt due to the 2015 earthquake.

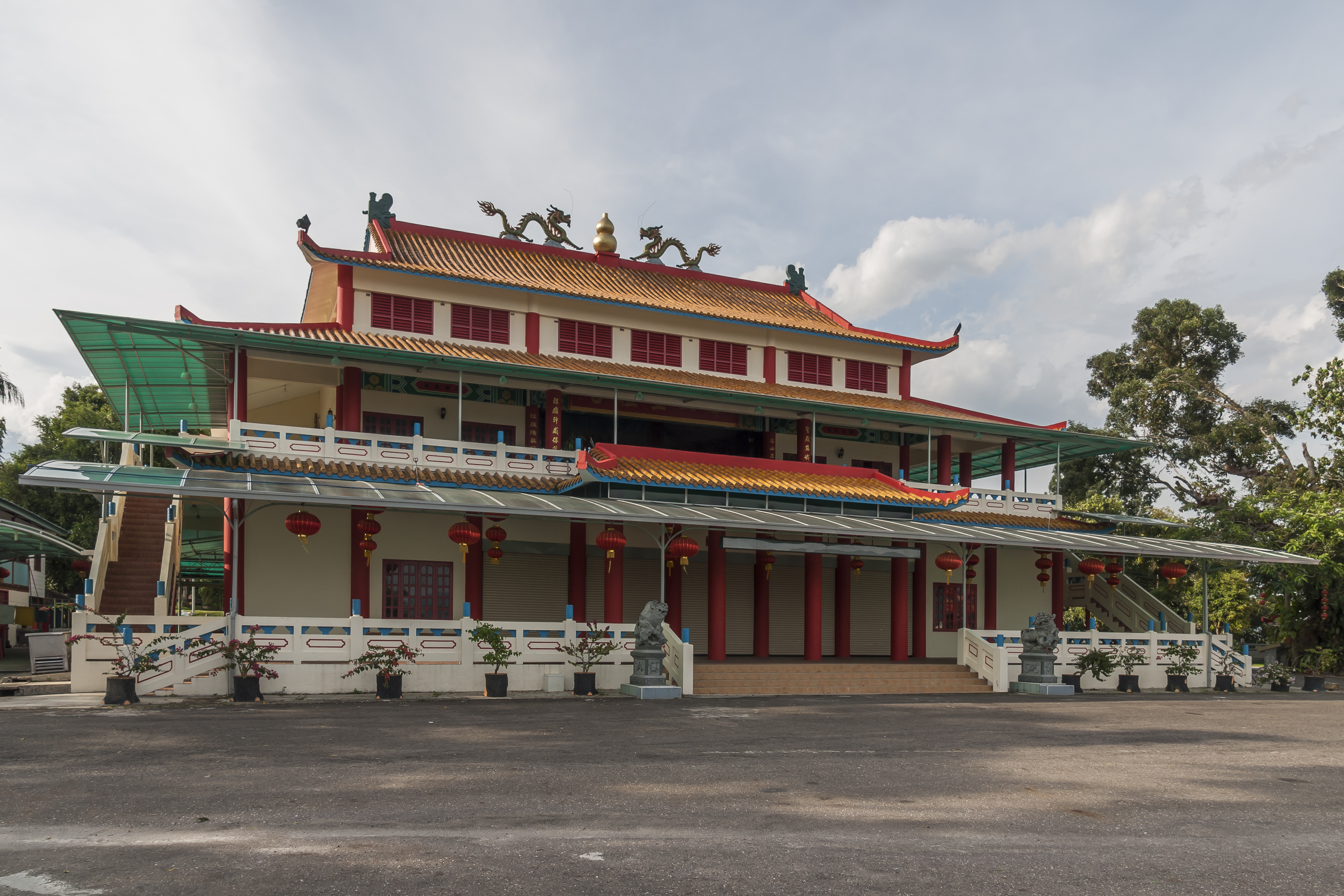
The Wah San Chon Chu Kung Temple.

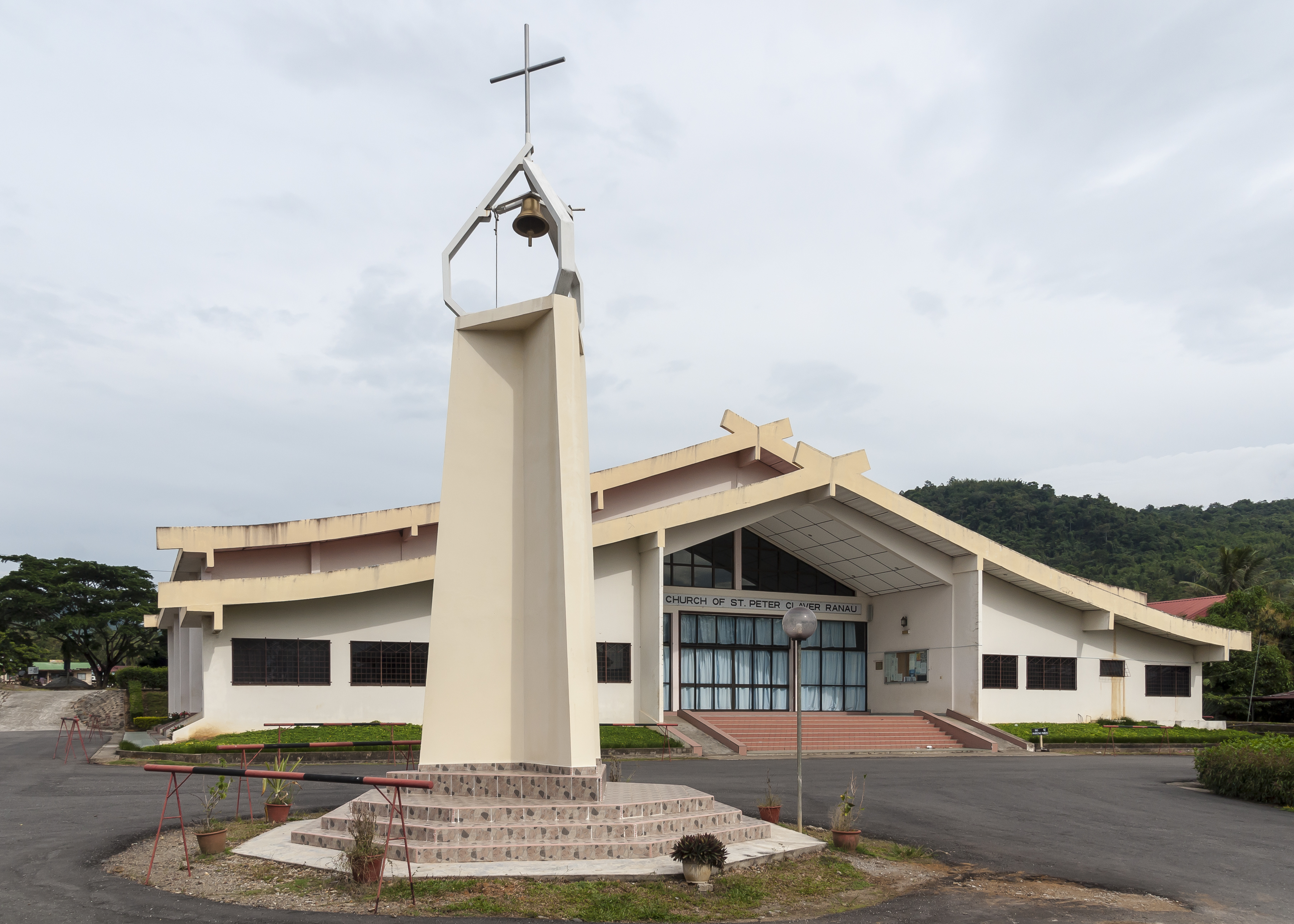
St. Peter Claver Catholic Church.

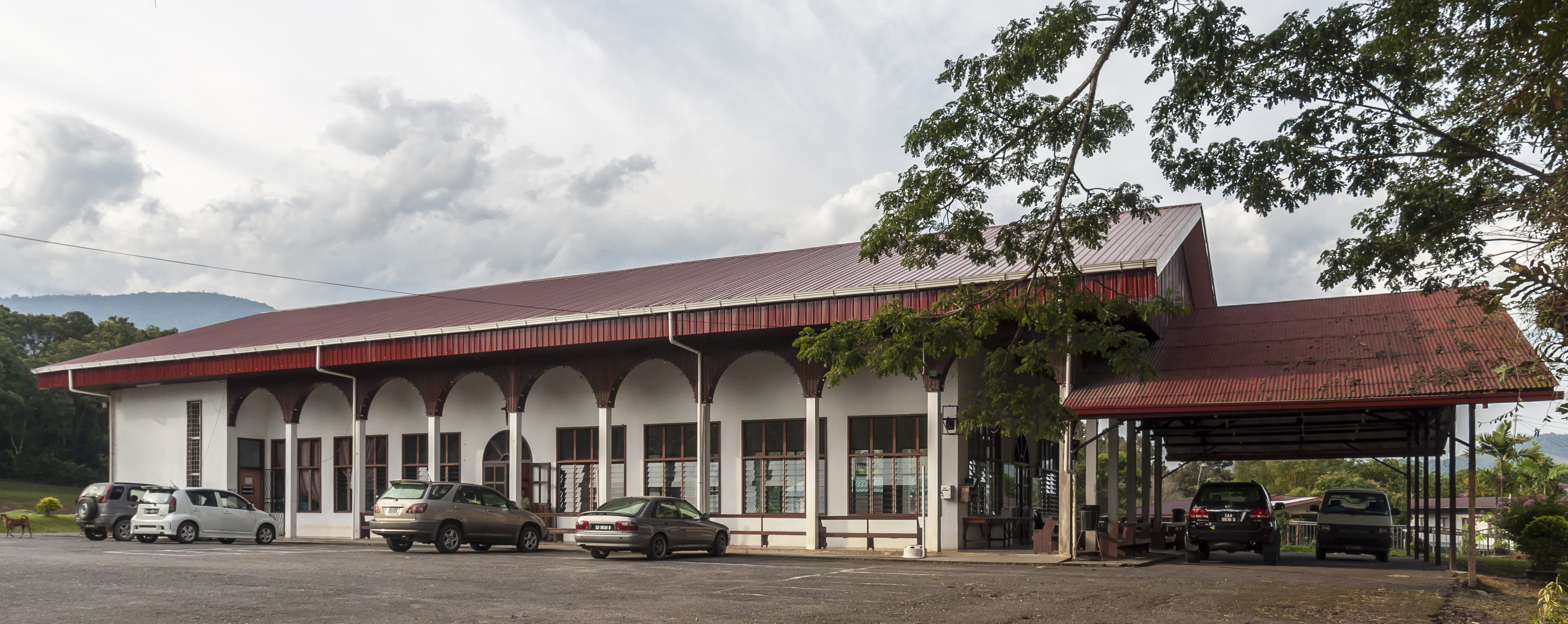
The Borneo Evangelical Church.

According to the 2010 Census, there were 94,092 people residing in the district, with 14,207 households and 15,514 living quarters. The population density was 26 people per km^{2} (68.5/ sq mi).

The racial makeup of the district consisted of 93.1% Kadazan-Dusun, 1.7% Chinese, 1.16% Bajau, 1.0% Malay, 0.15% Murut, 0.1% Indians, 4% Other Bumiputera and 0.8% listed as Others. 6.0% were Non-Malaysian citizens, mainly foreign workers from Indonesia and the Philippines working as labours in large farms and plantations.

In the district the population was spread out, with 48,341 male residents (51.4%) and 45,751 female residents (48.6%) out of which 39.1% under the age of 15, 20.1% from 15 to 24, 25% from 25 to 44, 11.8% from 45 to 64, and 3.9% who were 65 years of age or older. For every 100 females there were 106 males.

As of 2000, 46.85% of the population practised Islam. Closely behind, Christians made up 45.68% of the population while 1.09% were Buddhists and 0.06% were Hindus. 6.31% were recorded as "Others", presumably referring the remaining natives who still practice ancestral animistic beliefs and traditions.

Major Places of Worship

- Mosque
  - Ar-Rahman Mosque (Masjid Jamek Ar-Rahman).
- Temple
  - Ranau Wah San Chon Chu Kung (兰瑙华山圣祖宮).
- Churches
  - St. Peter Claver Catholic Church.
  - Basel Christian Church of Malaysia.
  - Borneo Evangelical Church (Sidang Injil Borneo (SIB)).
  - St. Paul's Anglican Church.
  - Seventh-day Adventist Church.
  - True Jesus Church.

== Administrative divisions ==
Map of Ranau District

Ranau, 14 Sub-districts and 87 Villages
Liwogu

Pekan Ranau, Kimolohing, Muhibbah, Paka II, Longut Baru, Kiaburi, Rapak/Takurik, Lintuhun, Lingkudau Lama, Lingkudau Baru, Tiang Baru, Kasiladan/Giman/Kawog, Kandawayon, Mininsalu Baru

Tanah Rata/Kituntul

Lukapon, Togudon Baru, Sinarut, Lasing, Marakau, Kilimu, Tanah Merah, Bahab, Libang, Kokob Baru, Tudangan, Matan, Silou, Badukan, Boduyon, Kituntul Lama, Kituntul Baru, Togoyog/Lipoi, Kinapulidan, Mindohuon Baru, Rugading, Kigiuk

Tambiau/Mohimboyon

Kibbas, Purakagis, Koporingan, Tambiau, Sarapong, Paka I, Toboh Baru, Liposu Baru, Liposu Lama, Wa'ang, Kiwawoi, Mohimboyon

Suminimpod/Kopongian

Gana-Gana, Kopongian, Giring-Giring, Nampasan Lama, Gaur, Suminimpod, Mininsalu Lama/Narambai, Niasan, Bayag, Kita'i, Longut, Tiang Lama

Kundasang/Bundu Tuhan

Pinousuk, Tambalang, Ruhukon, Sinisian, Somuruh, Naradau, Desa Aman, Lembah Permai, Dumpiring Bawah, Kinoundusan, JKDB Pekan Kundasang, Dumpiring Atas, Kinasaraban, Kundasang Lama, Cinta Mata, Kalangaan, Kouluan, Mosilou, Sokid Bundu Tuhan, Siba Bundu Tuhan, Gondohon

Lohan/Bongkud

Lohan Ulu, Karanaan Baru, Kinasaraban Baru, Lohan Skim I, Minihas/Maukab Baru, Rondogung Baru, Kinorotuan, Silad, Lohan Skim II, Simpangan Poring, Nampasan Baru, Poring, Nopung I, Nopung II, Narawang, Namaus, Bongkud, Lutut, Waluhu

Rondogung

Mumpait, Kinarasan, Poropot, Rondogung, Lagkau, Kosisingon, Tungou, Sumalang, Maukab

Perancangan

Singgaron Baru, Togis, Perancangan, Dobut Langsat, Tokutan, Langsat, Nalumad, Kilanas Baru, Kirokot

Nalapak

Sodul I, Sodul II, Muruk, Luanti Baru, Nalapak, Kobuh Baru, Nobutan, Sungangon, Sagindai Baru, Sagindai Lama

Karanaan/Togudon

Karanaan, Sosondoton, Komburongoh/Mogoho/Soyod, Piasau, Togudon Lama/Pulutan, Himbaan, Pahu, Ratau, Torolobou, Tinatasan, Toboh Pahu, Toboh Lama, Tudan I, Tudan II

Timbua

Tarawas, Pinawantai, Pahu Pinawantai, Dobut Timbua, Kembiroi Timbua, Timbua, Lobou Baru, Togop Laut, Tinutuan, Togop Darat, Morungin I, Lobou Timbua, Morungin II, Pinampadan, Tibabar, Turuntungon, Monggis, Tumbalang, Lobou Lama, Daramakan, Keiyep, Nawanon, Kantas Baru, Pugi

Paginatan

Matupang, Torikon/Tadsom, Minihas, Paginatan, Bunakon, Lungkidau, Soborong Paginatan, Maringkan, Balisok, Tabah, Nunuk Ragang, Toupus, Miruru, Mangkadait, Mindohuon Lama, Toporoh, Mantapok, Tompios

Molinsou

Mokodou, Kopuakan, Tanid, Linapasan, Malinsou Darat / Nasakot, Sumbilingon, Wayan, Tinindoi, Sinurai, Mangkapoh I, Tinaum/Mangkapoh II, Mampakot/Molinsou

Kaingaran

Paka Sugut, Moningkulau, Kawiyan, Kilanas Sugut, Giring, Pinutudaan/Minintob, Kaingaran, Kotog, Moridi, Botong, Tinongian, Namaus, Ulu Sugut, Kiwakau, Karagasan, Pamaitan, Patau, Tundangon Ulu Sugut, Mansalu, Gan, Gusi

In the national level, Ranau has only one parliamentary seat for the House of Representatives which is P.179 Ranau while in the state level, it is represented by three state assemblymen in the Sabah State Legislative Assembly, each one for N.29 Kundasang, N.30 Karanaan and N.31 Paginatan state assembly seats respectively.

Ranau district is divided into 14 sub-districts and each sub-district is divided into villages. There are a total of 212 villages in Ranau.

== Economy ==
Ranau is an important agricultural and tourism centre in Sabah and this two sectors have been the main economy backbone for the district. Most of the tourism business are centred around the highlands of Kundasang, a sub-district in Ranau while agriculture business is widespread all over Ranau. Therefore, most people of Ranau work as farmers or operators of their own business although there are white-collar workers as well mainly in the government sectors such health, education, service and administration and a few in the banking sector.

== Education ==
=== Primary and secondary schools ===
==== Public schools ====
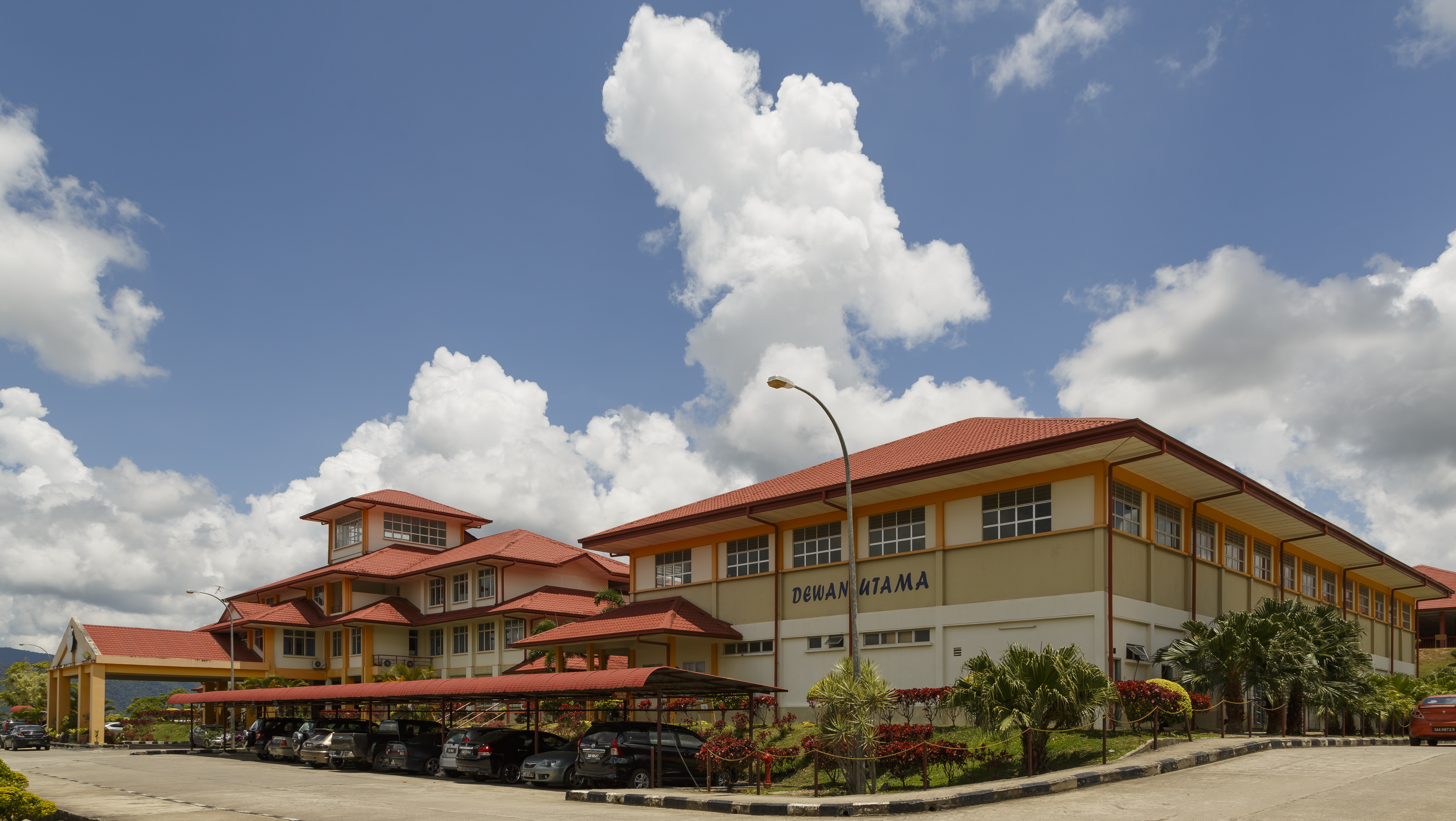
SMK Ranau, one of the secondary schools of the district

The Ranau District Education Office oversees the public school system consisting of 71 primary schools and 11 secondary schools.

The only Chinese National-type school in Ranau is Pai Wen National-type (Chinese) Primary School (兰瑙培文小学). The two schools with Christian missionaries background are St. Benedict National Primary School and Don Bosco National Primary School.

The nine national secondary schools in the district are SMK Mat Salleh, SMK Ranau, SMK Bundu Tuhan, SMK Kundasang, SMK Matupang Jaya, SMK Timbua, SMK Lohan, SMK Ulu Sugut, SMK Kemburongoh while the remaining two secondary schools, SMKA Mohammad Ali and SMA Al-Irsyadiah Marakau, are Islamic religious schools.

==== Public boarding school ====
The MARA Junior Science College (MRSM) Ranau campus admitted its first batch of students in March 2024.

=== Institute of higher education ===
- Borneo Theological Seminary (formerly known as Maktab Teologi Sabah)

== Sports and Recreation ==
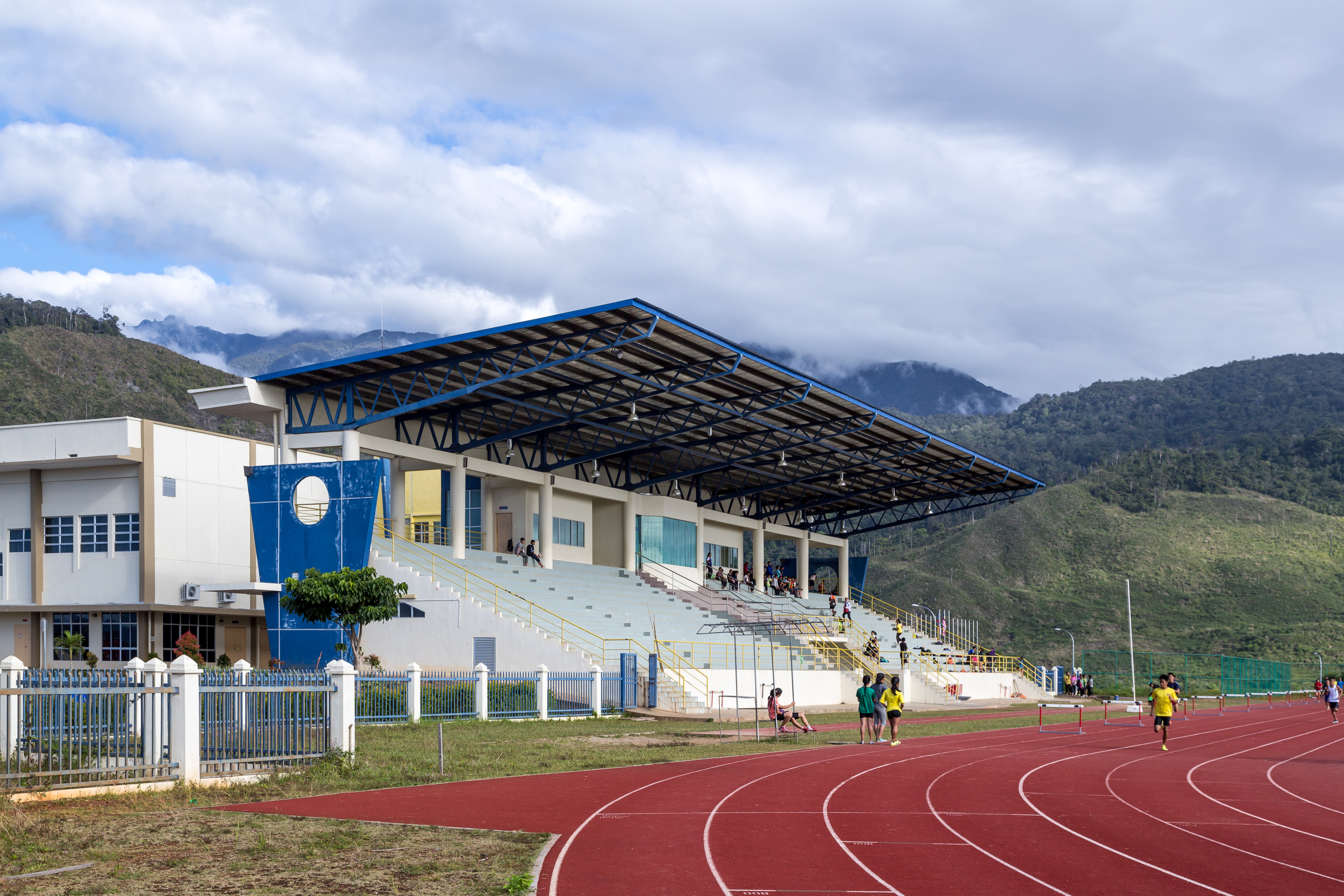
Stadium of Ranau Sports Complex

=== Ranau Sports Complex (KSR) ===
Ranau Sports Complex is located at an altitude of 780 m above the sea level and surrounded by hills. The chilly climate engulfing the sports complex makes the place very suitable as a training ground for all sports.

=== Ranau Recreation & Golf Club (RRGC) ===
RRGC located at Kilometre 1, Jalan Ranau - Tambunan, Ranau, Sabah. 9 hole golf course with panoramic view of the imposing Mount Kinabalu. With state of the rolling fairways and green are difficult to read, it could test the strategy of golfers. The club was joined by some of the best clubs around. With a total length of 5.737 metres for men and 5.053 metres for lady. Course rating : Par 72. Slope Rating : 128 (Men) / 118 (Lady).

== Culture ==
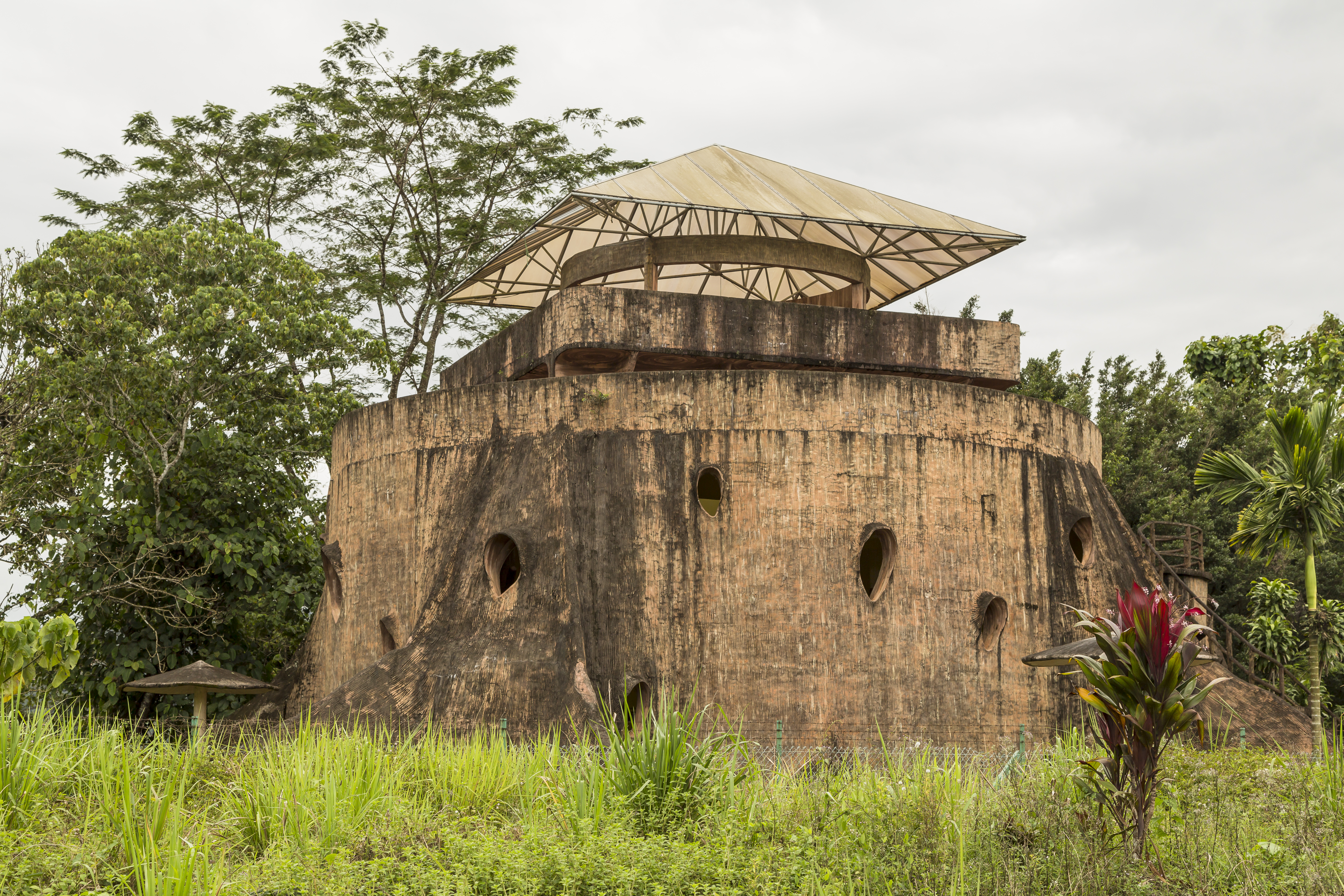
Nunuk Ragang building in Tampios

Ranau commands a special place in the minds of all Kadazan-Dusun because of the significance of Nunuk Ragang as the original home of their ancestors, before the dispersal and migration throughout Borneo. Nunuk Ragang is in Tampios, at the confluence of the Liwagu Kowananan and Liwagu Kogibangan, draining into the Labuk River. A landmark building in the form of a banyan tree has been built at the supposed site of the longhouse housing the first Kadazan-Dusun settlers of Nunuk Ragang. Some Bobolians, keepers of the cultural and racial memories, opined that the ancestors came from "pogun Sina" or China Homeland. This is somewhat supported by the fact that certain words in Kadazan-Dusun share similarities with that of ethnic Taiwanese tribes.

A number of festive celebrations observed by Ranau people can be seen celebrated throughout the year, be it religious or cultural celebrations and among them, the major ones are Tadau Kaamatan (Harvest Festival), Eid ul-Fitr, Christmas, Good Friday, and Chinese New Year.

== Notable people ==
Government and politics

- Abdul Ghani Gilong (1932-2021), former federal minister
- Mark Koding (1949-2003), former Sabah Deputy Chief Minister
- Kasitah Gaddam (born 1947), former federal minister
- Siringan Gubat (1949-2018), former state minister and Paginatan assemblyman from 2013-2018, former member of parliament from 2008-2013 and former Ranau state assemblyman from 1990-1999
- Masidi Manjun (born 1951), incumbent Sabah Finance Minister, and Karanaan assemblyman since 2004
- Joachim Gunsalam (born 1958), incumbent Sabah Deputy Chief Minister II and Local Government and Housing Minister, Kundasang assemblyman since 2004
- Abidin Madingkir, incumbent Assistant Minister to the Sabah Chief Minister, Paginatan assemblyman since 2018 and the first mayor of Kota Kinabalu City Hall of Kadazandusun descent, former permanent secretary of the Sabah Ministry of Education, Technology, Science and Innovation as well as Sabah Ministry of Local Government and Housing
- Ewon Ebin (born 1954), former federal and Sabah state cabinet minister cum member of parliament from 2013-2018 and former assemblyman for Paginatan from 2004-2013 and Kundasang state seats from 1986-1994
- Nordin Siman, the second Mayor of Kota Kinabalu City Hall of Kadazandusun descent, former Tambunan district officer from 1982-1983 and former Sabah State Civil Service department director
- Dr. Sabin Samitah, the third as well as current mayor of Kota Kinabalu City Hall of Kadazandusun descent as well as the first Sabahan Inland Revenue Board CEO
- Matius Sator, former Permanent Secretary to the Sabah Local Government and Housing Ministry
- Jonathan Yasin, current Member of Parliament for Ranau since 2018

Sports

- Danny Kuilin, top mountain runner, 2010 Skyrunner World Series
- Saffrey Sumping, top mountain runner, 2010 Skyrunner World Series

Entertainment

- Nazrey Johani (born 1971), former member of Raihan
- Linda Nanuwil (born 1984), singer, first runner-up Akademi Fantasia Season 2
- Adira (born 1991), singer, first runner-up Akademi Fantasia Season 8

== Friendship district ==
- Longmen County, Huizhou, China (since 10 October 2011)

== Notes ==
Bibliography

- Mamut Copper Mining Sdn. Bhd. (1996). A Responsible Approach To Resource Development. Paragraphics.
- Koy, R.M.S.; S. Koroh, D.; Koy, A.K.L.; Koy, L.T.L.; Koy, D.T.F (2007a). "Malaysia's Who's who". Malaysia's Who's Who - 2007. Vol. 1. Kuala Lumpur: Kasuya Management. p. 714. ISBN 978-983-9624-05-2.
- Koy, R.M.S.; S. Koroh, D.; Koy, A.K.L.; Koy, L.T.L.; Koy, D.T.F (2007b). "Malaysia's Who's who". Malaysia's Who's Who - 2007. Vol. 2. Kuala Lumpur: Kasuya Management. p. 1245. ISBN 978-983-9624-05-2.
- Rutter, Owen (1922). British North Borneo: An Account of its History, Resources and Native Tribes. Great Britain: Constable.
- Phillips, Anthea; Liew, Francis (2005). Kinabalu Park: Sabah, Malaysian Borneo. United Kingdom: New Holland. ISBN 1-84330-359-0.
- British North Borneo Company (1899). Views of British North Borneo Company With A Brief History Of The Colony. London: William Brown.
- Pryer, W.B. (1893). A Decade In Borneo. London: Hutchinson.
- Osman, Sabihah; Ali, Ismail; Basrah, Baszley; Omar, Marja Azlina; et al. (2007). Datu Paduka Mat Salleh, Pahlawan Sabah (Hero of Sabah) (1894–1900). Sabah State Archives.
- R. Evans, Stephen (1999). Sabah (North Borneo) Under The Rising Sun Government. Malaysia. ISBN 978-983-3987-24-5.
