= Sandakan Airport =

Airport serving Sandakan, Sabah, Malaysia

Sandakan Airport, Malaysia Lapangan Terbang Sandakan
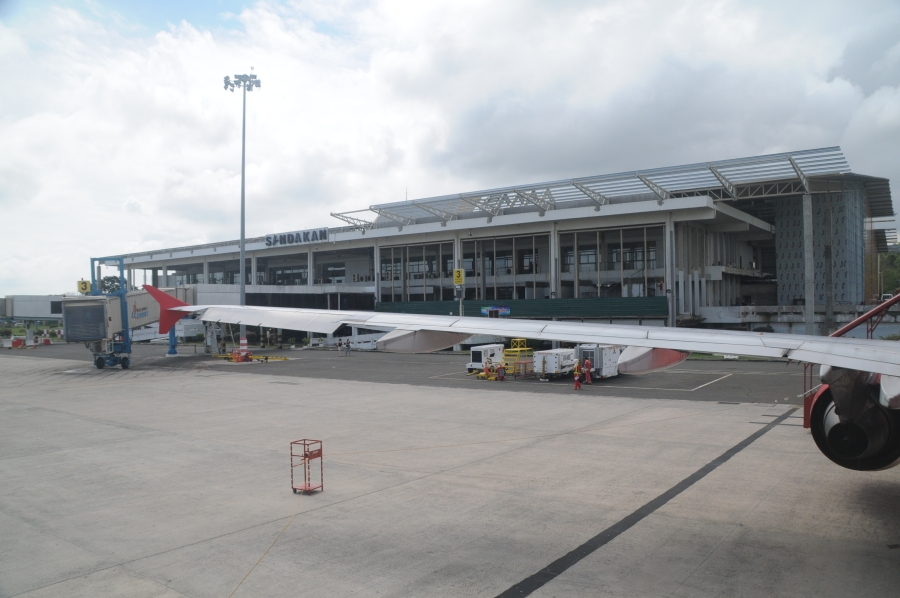
- IATA: SDK; ICAO: WBKS

Summary
- Airport type: Public
- Owner: Khazanah Nasional Berhad
- Operator: Malaysia Airports Holdings Berhad
- Serves: Sandakan Division, Sabah, East Malaysia
- Location: Sandakan, Sabah, East Malaysia
- Time zone: MST (UTC+08:00)
- Elevation AMSL: 46 ft (14 m)
- Coordinates: 05°54′06″N 118°02′55″E

Map
- Location in Sabah state Location in East Malaysia Location in Borneo Location in Malaysia Location in Southeast Asia

Runways
Direction	Length		Surface
Direction	m	ft	Surface
08/26	2,500	8,202	Asphalt

Statistics (2020)
- Passenger: 362,692 (▼66.5%)
- Airfreight (tonnes): 1,657 (▼34.9%)
- Aircraft movements: 6,034 (▲50.5%)
- Sources: Official web site AIP Malaysia

Sandakan Airport (IATA: SDK, ICAO: WBKS) is a domestic airport located in Sandakan, Sabah, Malaysia, approximately 14 km (8.7 mi)) west of the town center. It serves as an important gateway for both passenger and cargo traffic, supporting the local economy and regional tourism. In 2022, the airport handled 621,513 passengers and recorded 10,876 flight movements, making it the 12th busiest airport in Malaysia.

The airport was originally built by the Japanese during World War II and was later repurposed for civilian use to aid in the post-war reconstruction of the region. It began commercial operations in the 1950s and has been upgraded over the years to accommodate growing demand. Significant infrastructure improvements have included terminal expansions, runway extensions, and the introduction of modern navigational systems.

In recent years, the airport has seen major developments, including a terminal expansion completed in 2014, which increased the terminal area to 12,500 square meters, with a capacity to handle 750 passengers per hour. In 2022, a runway extension project was completed, lengthening the runway to 2,500 meters (8,202 feet) and enhancing the airport's ability to handle larger aircraft such as the Airbus A330.

== History ==
=== Wartime Origins and Construction ===
The site of Sandakan Airport was first identified by the British Royal Air Force (RAF) during World War II as a potential location for a military airfield. However, the project was still in its early stages when Japanese forces invaded Borneo in early 1942. Recognizing the strategic value of the location, the Japanese military completed the airfield as a refueling stop for aircraft traveling between Malaya and the Philippines.

The airfield was constructed under extreme conditions using forced labor. Approximately 1,500 British and Australian prisoners of war (POWs) transported from Singapore to Sandakan, along with local and Javanese laborers, built a 1,400-meter (4,593 feet) runway on challenging tufa soil. The construction was marked by severe abuse, malnutrition and disease among the workers.

The airfield became operational in December 1942, with the landing of Japanese General Yamawaki Masataka. However, as the tide of the war turned against Japan, the airfield’s strategic importance diminished. By 1945, it was abandoned by Japanese forces, and the remaining POWs were evacuated, many of whom perished during the infamous Sandakan Death Marches.

=== Transition to Civil Aviation ===
Following World War II, the airfield, originally constructed by the Japanese, was repurposed for civilian use to aid in the post-war reconstruction of Sandakan and the wider North Borneo region, later known as Sabah. In the 1950s, Sandakan Airport began establishing itself as a key hub for commercial aviation.

Malayan Airways commenced regular flights to Sandakan, connecting the town with Singapore with stopovers in Kuching, Sibu, Labuan and Jesselton. The airline initially operated Douglas DC-3 aircraft, and the airport became the terminus for eastbound flights across British Borneo, integrating Sandakan into the regional air transport network.

In 1953, Sabah Airways (later known as Borneo Airways) established Sandakan Airport as its base, boosting the airport's regional prominence. The airline operated a route connecting Tawau, Lahad Datu, Sandakan, Jesselton and Labuan until its operations were eventually centralized at Labuan Airport.

International flights at Sandakan Airport also began with Cathay Pacific operating services between Hong Kong, Manila, Jesselton and Labuan. Similar to Malayan Airways, both Borneo Airways and Cathay Pacific utilized Douglas DC-3 aircraft for these mainline routes.

=== Economic Growth and Airport Expansion ===
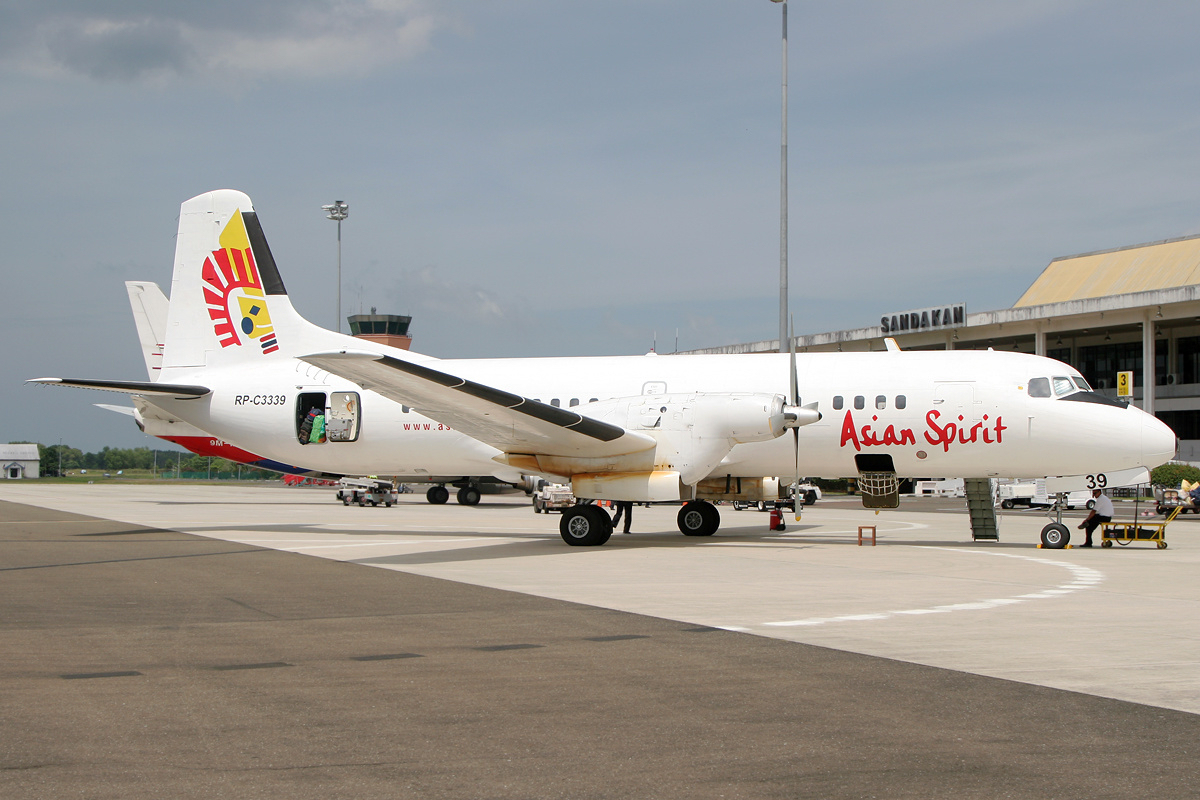
An Asian Spirit NAMC YS-11 at Sandakan Airport, operating the Zamboanga-Sandakan route in 2007, with the terminal (prior to its refurbishment) visible in the background.

The expansion of natural resource industries in Sabah during the 1960s through the 1980s contributed to Sandakan’s growing role as the state's second-largest town. The airport became an essential link for trade and commerce. During this period, the airport saw the introduction of larger turboprop aircraft, such as the Fokker 27, and by the 1980s, Boeing 737 jetliners began operating at the airport. Significant infrastructure upgrades, including runway extensions and terminal improvements, supported the increased capacity needed to handle rising passenger and cargo traffic, further strengthening the airport’s connectivity and role in regional economic development.

In the 1980s and 1990s, Sandakan Airport underwent further modernization to support its growing capacity. Upgrades to navigational systems, cargo facilities and passenger amenities were implemented to enhance the efficiency of airport operations. These improvements aligned with the growth of the region's eco-tourism sector and contributed to the airport's ability to manage both domestic and international flights more effectively.

By the early 2000s, Sandakan Airport achieved record growth, handling 621,513 passengers and nearly 11,000 aircraft movements in 2005. The introduction of international routes to Zamboanga, Philippines, by carriers such as South Phoenix Airways, Southeast Asian Airlines, Malaysia Airlines and Asian Spirit further boosted its role in regional connectivity.

=== Recent Developments ===
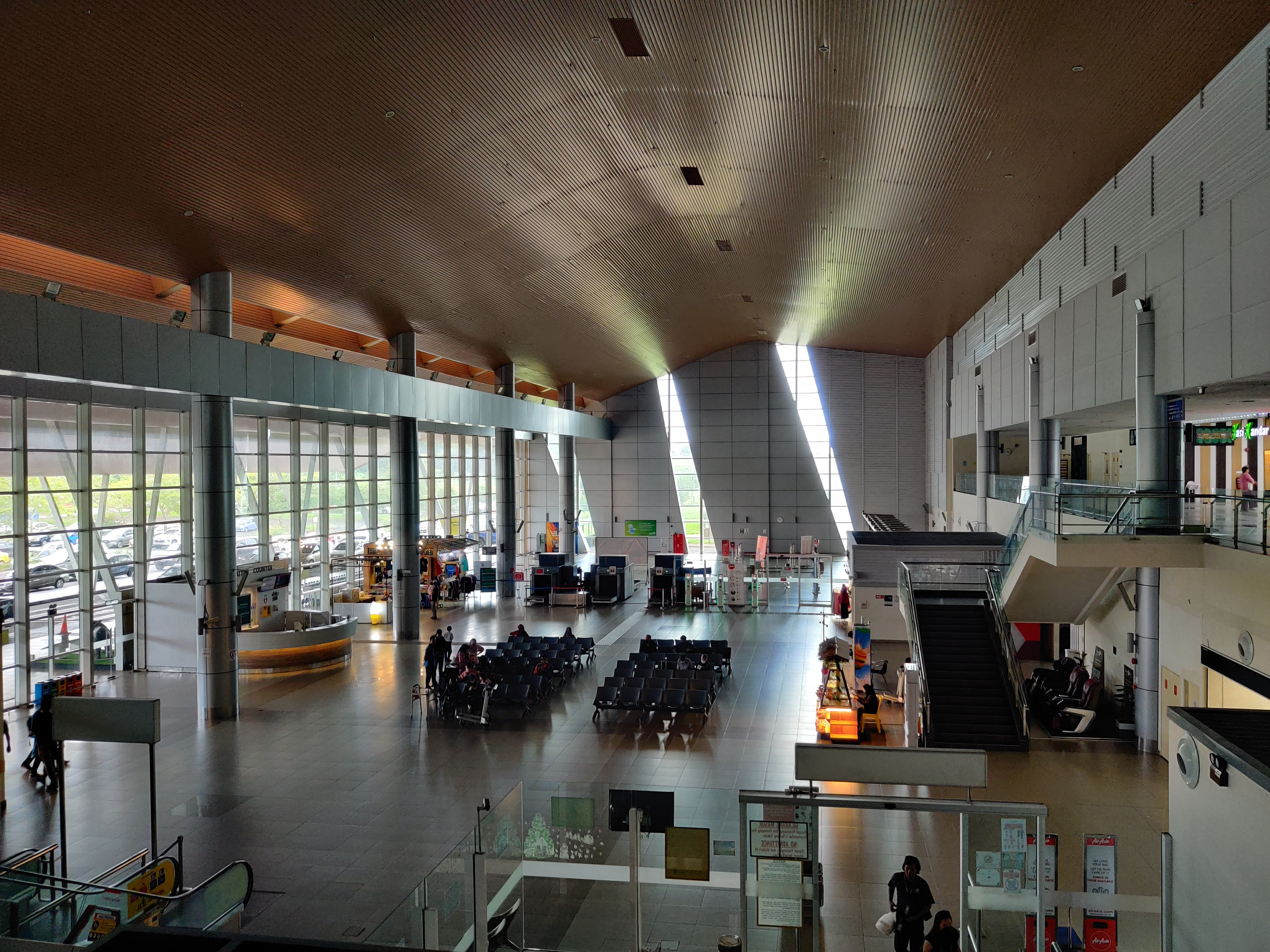
Sandakan Airport Landside View

In May 2013, Sandakan Airport commenced a major terminal expansion project aimed at increasing capacity. The terminal was expanded to 12,500 square meters, with a handling capacity of 750 passengers per hour (PPH). The expansion was completed ahead of schedule in October 2014, enhancing both the passenger experience and operational capacity.

In 2017, an RM 80 million runway extension project was announced to meet the growing operational demands of the airport. The project, completed in June 2022, extended the runway to 2,500 meters (8,202 feet) and introduced Taxiway Bravo. Runway 08 was upgraded with an Instrument Landing System (ILS), while Runway 26 was equipped with VOR and RNAV approach capabilities, improving the airport’s navigational infrastructure.

The extended runway now allows unrestricted takeoff for narrow-body aircraft such as the Boeing 737-800 and Airbus A320/A321, and limited operations for wide-body aircraft like the Airbus A330. These upgrades have significantly increased the airport’s capacity to handle larger aircraft and higher passenger and cargo volumes.

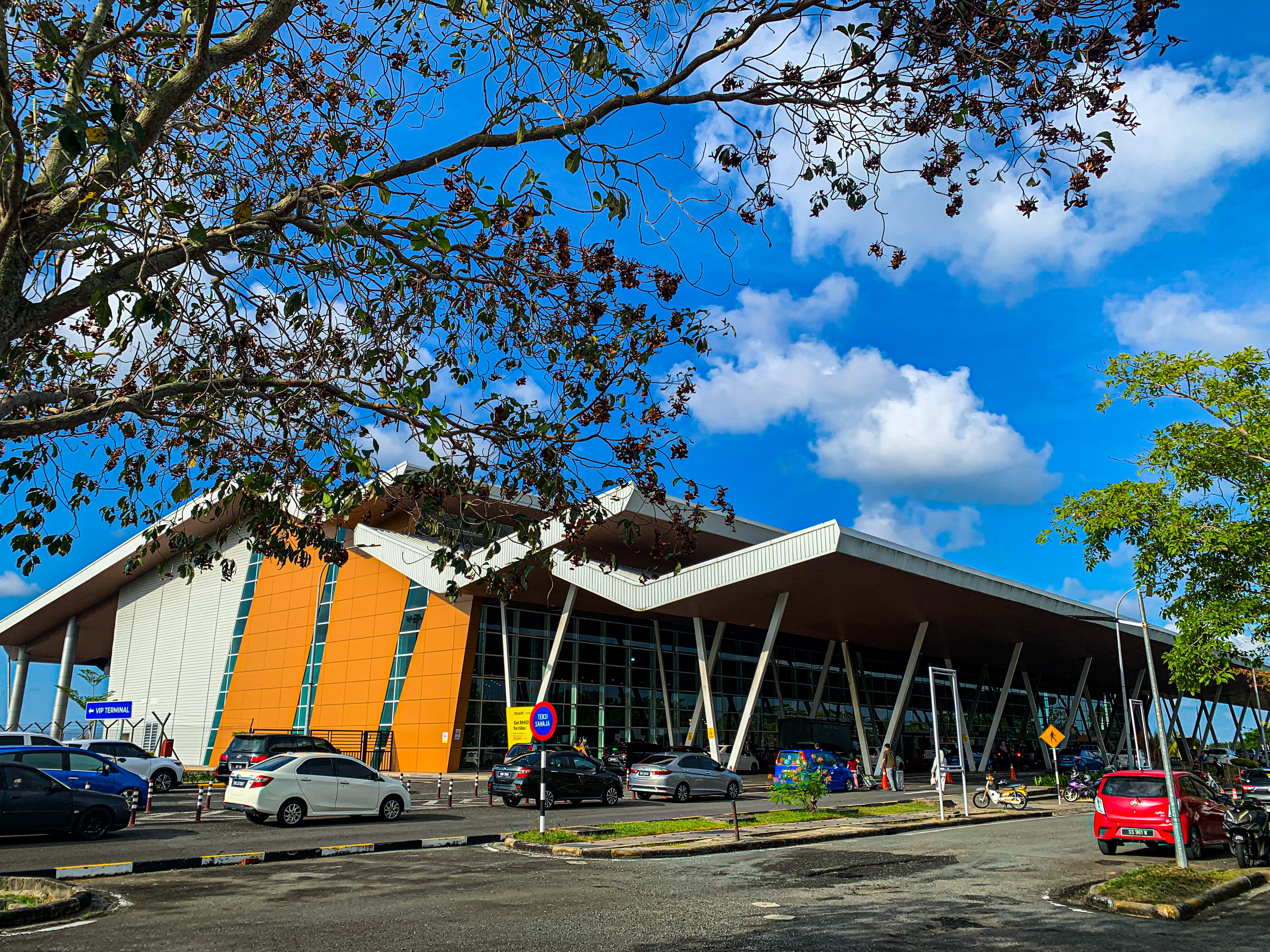
Sandakan Airport main entrance lobby

In 2017, Cebgo, a subsidiary of Cebu Pacific, announced plans to launch flights from Zamboanga to Sandakan, though the service never materialised. The airport’s international reach expanded in 2019 when RB Link, Royal Brunei Airlines regional subsidiary, began operating flights to Bandar Seri Begawan. By 2023, Philippines AirAsia expressed interest in developing a Philippines-Sandakan route, potentially from Manila or other airports such as Davao, Puerto Princesa or Zamboanga.

As of 2023, the terminal is capable of handling up to 1.4 million passengers annually, with peak hour capacity reaching 1,000 passengers. The terminal includes several retail outlets and food and beverage services.

The airport features five aircraft parking bays, including two equipped with Jetway and Visual Docking Guidance System (VDGS) services. In addition, the airport has two turboprop bays, and Remote Bay 5A, located farther from the terminal, can be adapted for occasional wide-body aircraft operations. These enhancements have strengthened Sandakan Airport’s capacity to accommodate increased passenger and cargo traffic, supporting regional tourism and economic activities.

== Airlines and destinations ==
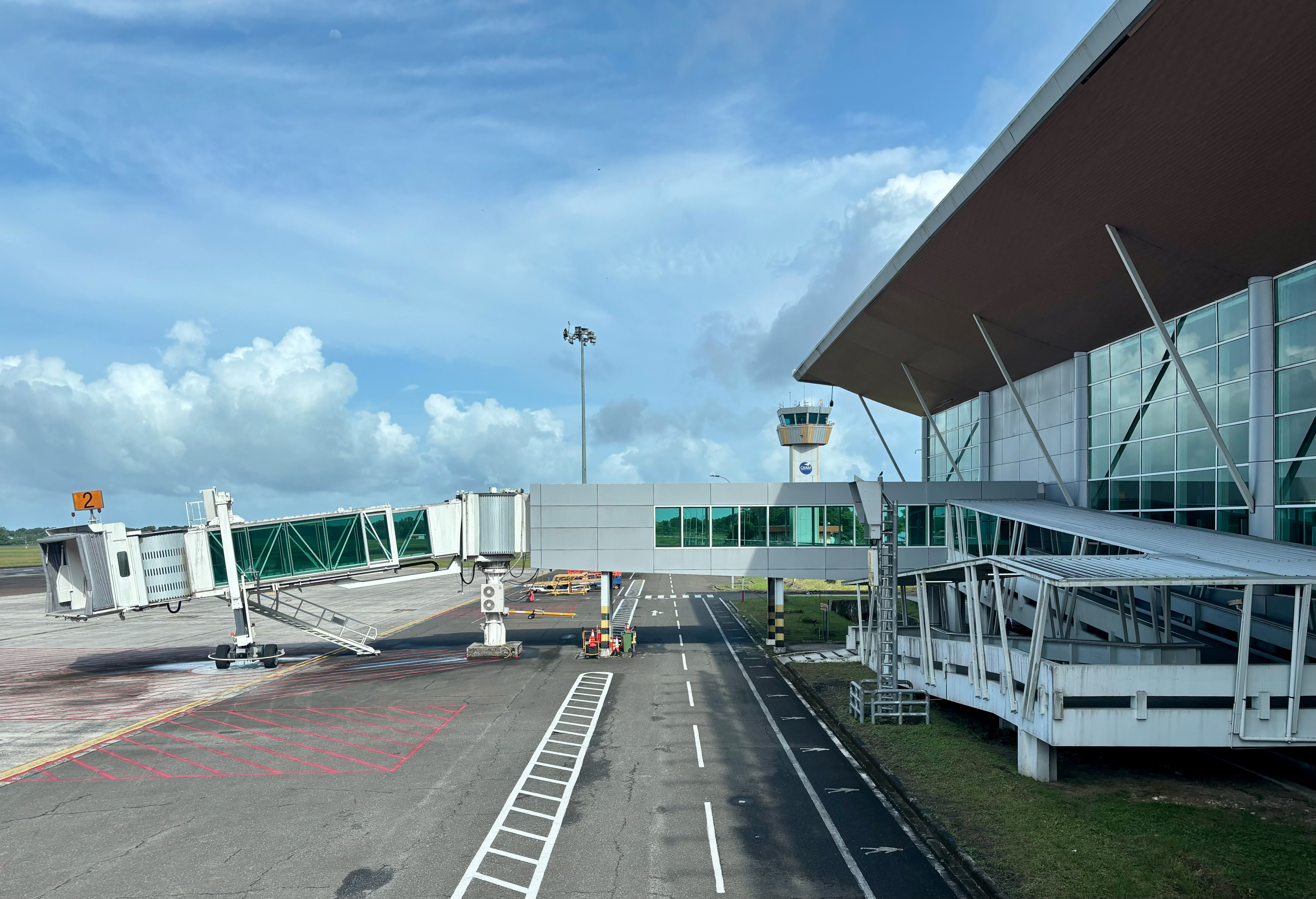
Sandakan Airport apron view

Airlines	Destinations
AirAsia	Kota Kinabalu, Kuala Lumpur–International
AirBorneo	Lahad Datu, Tawau
Batik Air Malaysia	Kota Kinabalu, Kuala Lumpur–International
Malaysia Airlines	Kuala Lumpur–International

== Traffic and statistics ==
Annual passenger numbers and aircraft statistics
Year	Passengers handled	Passenger % Change	Cargo (tonnes)	Cargo % Change	Aircraft Movements	Aircraft % Change
2003	497,999	Steady	3,713	Steady	10,588	Steady
2004	574,213	▲15.3	4,053	▲9.2	10,823	▲2.2
2005	621,513	▲8.2	4,531	▲11.8	11,662	▲7.7
2006	633,194	▲1.9	5,475	▲20.8	10,776	▼7.6
2007	626,192	▼1.1	6,224	▲13.7	8,410	▼22.0
2008	618,927	▼1.2	3,055	▼50.9	9,622	▲14.4
2009	672,469	▲8.6	2,099	▼31.3	12,915	▲34.2
2010	741,674	▲10.3	2,806	▲33.7	13,517	▲4.7
2011	788,515	▲6.3	2,300	▼18.0	11,715	▼13.3
2012	834,626	▲5.8	2,479	▲7.8	13,153	▲12.3
2013	911,855	▲9.3	2,894	▲16.7	12,856	▼2.3
2014	900,016	▼1.3	2,497	▼13.7	12,696	▼1.2
2015	853,411	▼5.2	3,147	▲26.0	12,705	▲0.1
2016	882,811	▲3.4	2,389	▼24.1	12,240	▼3.7
2017	896,347	▲1.5	2,211	▼7.4	10,859	▼11.3
2018	950,861	▲6.1	2,152	▼2.7	11,561	▲6.5
2019	1,083,686	▲14.0	2,547	▲18.3	12,179	▲5.3
2020	362,692	▼66.5	1,657	▼34.9	6,034	▼50.5
^{Source: Malaysia Airports Holdings Berhad}

=== Statistics ===
Busiest Routes Out of Sandakan Airport by Frequency as of October 2019
Rank	Destination	Frequency (Weekly)	Airlines
1	Kota Kinabalu, Sabah	53	AirAsia, Malaysia Airlines, Malindo Air
2	Kuala Lumpur	40	AirAsia, Malaysia Airlines, Malindo Air
3	Tawau, Sabah	14	Malaysia Airlines
4	Lahad Datu, Sabah	14	Malaysia Airlines
5	Kudat, Sabah	2	Malaysia Airlines
