= Let's Go Together =

Let's Go Together may refer to:

== Albums ==
- Let's Go Together (The Cats album), 1977

== Songs ==
- "Let's Go Together!", opening theme song of the English-language Spanish television series Jelly Jamm
- "Let's Go Together" (Change song), from the 1985 album Turn On Your Radio
- "Let's Go Together" (Diana Brescan song), disqualified from the Moldovan qualifiers for the 2020 Eurovision Song Contest
- "Let's Go Together" (Joe Stone song), 2017 single
- "Let's Go Together" (Mother), from the 2018 South Korean television series Mother
- "Let's Go Together" (Paul Kantner song), from the 1970 album Blows Against the Empire
- "Let's Go Together" (Pentagon song), from the 2018 EP Positive
- "Let's Go Together" (The Charlatans song), from the 2017 album Different Days
- "Let's Go Together" (The Raindrops song), 1964 single

== See also ==
- Kaikosha, Japanese organization whose name literally means "let's go together"
