= Local government in Sabah =

The local government in Sabah is the lowest level government in Sabah, Malaysia. It ranks third in the Malaysian government system after federal and state government. Local governments have the power to levy property taxes, to enact local laws and regulations, and to issue licenses and permits for any type of trade in their area. However, it also has the obligation to provide basic utilities, such as to regulate rubbish collection and waste disposal and to ensure urban or regional planning.

The district and municipal constitution in Sabah is based on the Local Government Ordinance 1961. This ordinance also regulates the responsibilities and functions of community organs. A state ministry, the Ministry of Local Government and Housing, which was first established after the 1963 state elections, regulates the activities of the district/municipal authorities in the state of Sabah.

== Foundation of local administration ==
Sabah is divided into administrative districts. The administrative districts are made up of towns and defined areas. These administrative districts, commonly referred to as the L.A.A (local authority area), will be governed by (depending on the status of the administrative district governed):

- "Dewan Bandaraya" (City Hall)
- "Majlis Perbandaran" (Municipal Council)
- "Majlis Daerah" (District Council)

The basis of this structure is the Local Government Ordinance 1961. This decree empowers the Yang di-Pertua Negeri, among other things, to equip the districts with certain powers and to determine the names and boundaries of the districts. The structure of the administrative districts was first established in 1961 by this ordinance and then amended as necessary by decree (Administrative Divisions Proclamation).

District	Name of the local government executive	Date of establishment	Number of council members	Decree
Beaufort	Beaufort District Council	1 January 1962	20	Beaufort District Council Instrument
Beluran	Beluran District Council	1 July 1968	11	Labuk/Sugut District Council Instrument 1968 (Note: By decree of 2 December 2004, it was ordered, inter alia, that in the future the word "Labuk/Sugut" should be replaced by the word "Beluran".)
Keningau	Keningau District Council	1 January 1962	20	Keningau District Council Instrument
Kota Belud	Kota Belud District Council	1 January 1962	18	Kota Belud District Council Instrument
Kinabatangan	Kinabatangan District Council	1 July 1968	11	Kinabatangan District Council Instrument
Kota Kinabalu	Kota Kinabalu City Hall	2 February 2000	20	Kota Kinabalu City Hall Instrument 2000
Kota Marudu	Kota Marudu District Council	1 January 1983	18	Kota Marudu District Council Instrument
Kuala Penyu	Kuala Penyu District Council	1 January 1962	18	Kuala Penyu District Council Instrument
Kudat	Kudat Town Board	1 January 1983	20	Kudat Town Board Instrument 1982
Kunak	Kunak District Council	1 June 1994	18	Kunak District Council Instrument 1994
Lahad Datu	Lahad Datu District Council	1 January 1962	18	Lahad Datu District Council Instrument
Papar	Papar District Council	1 January 1962	20	Papar District Council Instrument
Penampang	Penampang District Council	1 January 1962	20	Penampang District Council Instrument
Nabawan	Nabawan District Council	1 January 1964	11	Pensiangan District Council Instrument 1964 (Note: By decree of 2 December 2004, it was ordered, inter alia, that in the future the word "Pensiangan" should be replaced by the word "Nabawan".)
Pitas	Pitas District Council	8 June 2010	18	Pitas District Council Instrument 2009
Putatan	Putatan District Council	8 June 2010	18	Putatan District Council Instrument 2010
Ranau	Ranau District Council	1 January 1962	18	Ranau District Council Instrument
Sandakan	Sandakan Municipal Council	1 January 1982	20	Sandakan Municipal Council Instrument
Semporna	Semporna District Council	1 January 1962	18	Semporna District Council Instrument
Sipitang	Sipitang District Council	1 January 1962	18	Sipitang District Council Instrument
Tambunan	Tambunan District Council	1 January 1962	18	Tambunan District Council Instrument
Tawau	Tawau Municipal Council	1 January 1982	24	Tawau Municipal Council Instrument
Telupid				
Tenom	Tenom District Council	1 January 1962	18	Tenom District Council Instrument
Tongod	Tongod District Council			
Tuaran	Tuaran District Council	1 January 1962	20	Tuaran District Council Instrument 1961

== Division to districts ==

Sabah is initially divided into five administrative areas - Interior Division, Kudat Division, Sandakan Division, Tawau Division and West Coast Division. These administrative areas are assigned to districts. The administration of a district is the responsibility of a district officer. Associated with the district office is an assistant district officer. The administrative headquarters of the district is the District Office (Pejabat Daerah). Usually, the districts are named after the largest city/towns within the area or after the seat of the administration; For example, the town of Sandakan is the largest in the district of Sandakan under the Sandakan Division. Districts can be further subdivided into sub-districts (daerah kecil, literally "small district"). These do not represent a separate administrative level, but are to be understood as an "extended arm" of the district office, which perform certain administrative tasks in the district/municipalities. The status of a sub-district is an important step in the direction to achieve full district status. Until 2011, there were 11 sub-districts in Sabah:

Banggi	Kemabong	Matunggong	Menumbok	
Pagalungan	Sook	Sukau	Tamparuli	Tungku

== Status of administrative districts ==
Sabah has three different types of administrative districts. The lowest level of a local authority is the district administered by a district council. There are certain criteria for upgrading:

	Dewan Bandaraya (City Hall)	Majlis Perbandaran (Municipal Council)	Majlis Daerah (District Council)
Population	from 500,000 inhabitants	from 150,000 inhabitants	less than 150,000 inhabitants
Tax revenues	Sustainably secured income of at least RM100 million (Note: About €250 million.) (Note: Balanced housekeeping is a condition.)	Sustainably secured income of at least RM20 million (Note: About €5 million.)	Less than RM20 million
Areas	Kota Kinabalu	Sandakan, Tawau	Beaufort, Keningau, Kinabatangan/Tongod, Kota Belud, Kota Marudu/Pitas, Kuala Penyu, Kunak, Lahad Datu, Nabawan, Papar, Penampang/Putatan, Ranau, Semporna, Sipitang, Tambunan, Tenom, Tuaran, Kudat

The "Local Government Department of States of Malaysia" criteria for the status of a local authority comprise a number of requirements. For example, Kota Kinabalu had to prove for his status as a city hall, among other things:

- sustainable urban development;
- the presence of an industrial centre, a financial and commercial centre and tourism and business-oriented hotels;
- a fully developed infrastructure including public transport;
- a public perception of the city on a national and international level;
- a full range of educational facilities such as university, college, museum and public library;
- an internationally active centre of sports and cultural activities as well;
- the organisation of national and international congresses

== Others ==
=== Differences from other states ===
Unlike other states in Malaysia, the administrative level of mukim does not exist in Sabah. In the context of the district/municipal administration in Sabah, mukim are a summary of various settlements and villages, which, however, are subordinate to the district offices.

=== Dependencies ===
In contrast to the situation in Germany, where the municipal councils always represent the representation of the municipal citizens even in their different forms (municipal representation), the members of the "City Hall", the "Municipal Council" and the "District Council" are not democratically elected by the people as they are appointed by the Minister of Local Government and Housing. The effectiveness of local laws and regulations is also only established by their ratification by the Minister of State.

=== Common abbreviations ===
Within the administrative of Sabah, the following abbreviations are often found:

Abbreviation	Malay translation	Official English term
L.A.A.		Local Authority Area
D.B.	Dewan Bandaraya	City Hall
M.P.	Majlis Perbandaran	Municipal Council
M.D.	Majlis Daerah	District Council
L.B.	Lembaga Bandaran	Town Board

== See also ==
- List of local governments in Malaysia
