= Kaikosha =

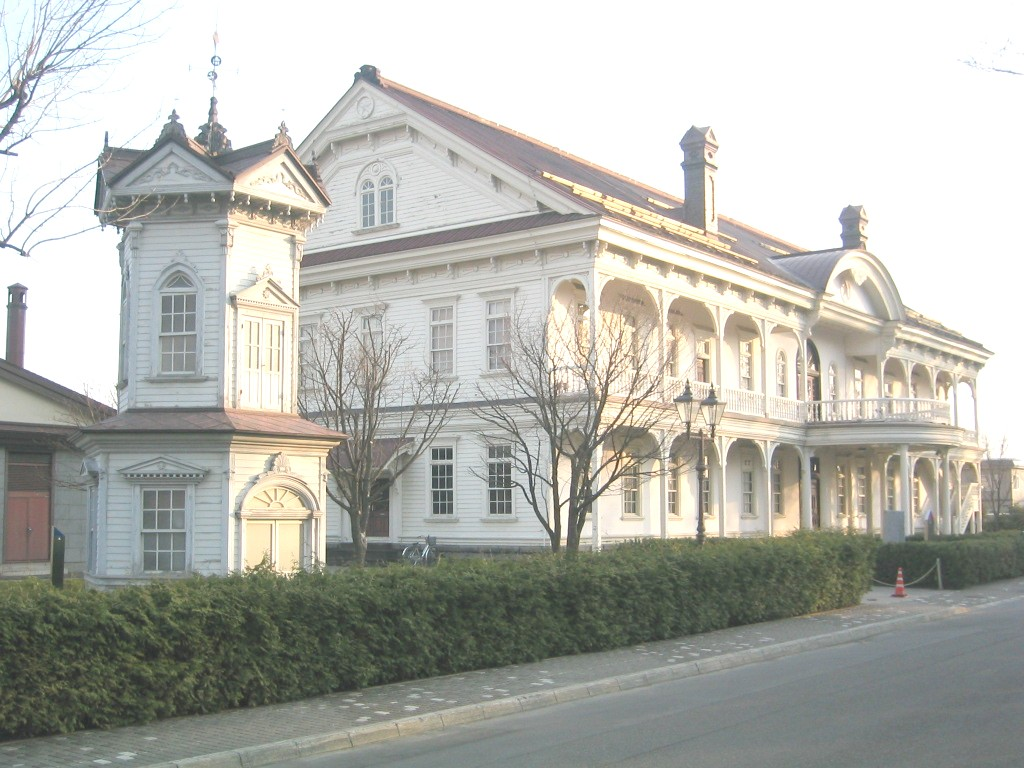
Asahikawa Museum of Sculpture, which was a Kaikosha clubhouse

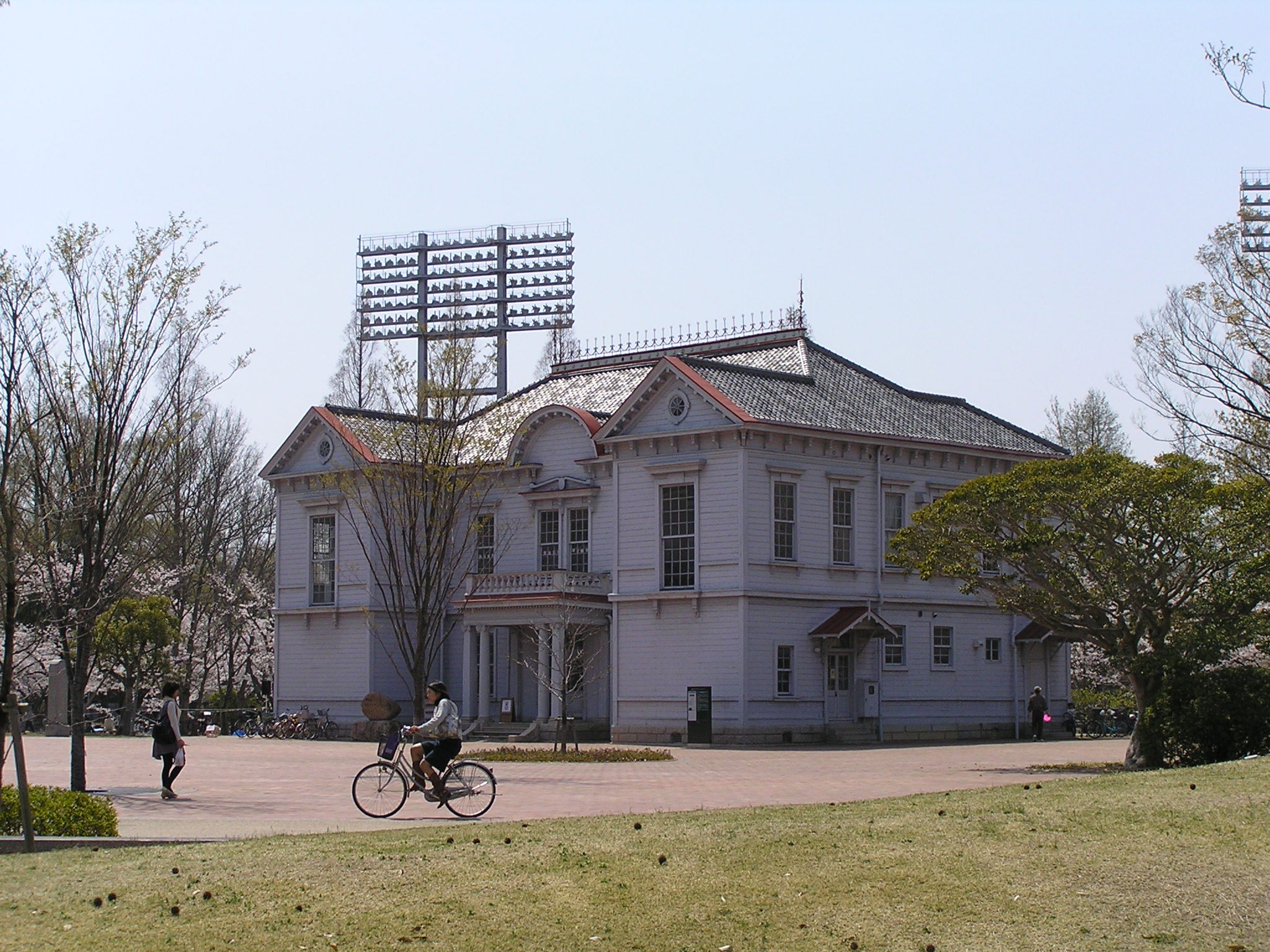
A former Kaikosha clubhouse in Okayama

Kaikosha (偕行社, Kaikōsha) is a Japanese organization of retired military servicemen whose membership is open to former commissioned officers of the JASDF and JGSDF as well as commissioned officers, warrant officers, officer cadets, and high-ranking civil servants who served in the Imperial Japanese Army. Since 1 February 2011 Kaikosha has been a non-profit organization described under Japanese law as a public interest foundation (公益財団法人).

The original Kaikosha was founded before World War II as an organization exclusively of active-duty commissioned officers and warrant officers in the Imperial Japanese Army for mutual aid, friendship, and academic research, but was re-founded after the war to represent formerly high-ranking army officials.

The organization's name means “let’s go together” or “we shall fight this war side by side,” and derives from a line in an old Chinese poem recorded in the Book of Odes.

== History ==
=== Before World War II ===
On 15 February 1877 not long after the formation of the Imperial Japanese Army a Kaikosha was founded in Kudan in Tokyo as a meeting place for officers and as a reception hall. After that Kaikosha groups cropped up at divisional headquarters across the country. Kaikosha was soon incorporated and set about providing aid to wounded soldiers, supporting temples that consecrated war dead, publishing academic research and essays on military topics, and fostering friendships among fellow officers both in active service and in the reserves. These activities were funded by membership fees.

Kaikosha was a major organization and also a sort of company that engaged in the manufacture and sale of military equipment, especially clothing, for officers. In addition to the basic tailor-made clothes, Kaikosha sold ready-made clothes that became popular at the time of World War II. Tags were attached to Kaikosha-made clothing upon which a symbol such as a cherry blossom or pentagram was emblazed across the letters “Kaikosha,” “Rikugun Kaikosha Gunjubu,” “Kudan Kaikosha,” or “Osaka Kaikosha Shuhobu.” Kaikosha stores also sold every variety of uniform, as well as military caps, gloves, boots, sabres, pistols, holsters, binoculars, and memorabilia from military exercises and parades, among other things. All these Kaikosha-made good were widely used by military officers.

Kaikosha also ran schools, inns, and cafes for use by officers and related individuals. The Osaka Kaikosha, which was linked with the 4th Division, owned a private elementary school for the sons of officers who desired to enter military academies which became so distinguished that eventually it admitted the sons of wealthy bankers, lawyers, and doctors as its primary students. After the war it became Ōtemon Academy Elementary School. The Asahikawa Kaikōsha Fuzoku Hokuchin Shōgakkō, now called the Asahikawa Shiritsu Hokuchin Shōgakkō, and the Hiroshima Kaikōsha Fuzoku Seibi Shōgakkō were also prestigious elementary schools.

=== After the war ===
Due to the defeat in the Second World War Kaikosha disbanded for a time, but starting around the year 1951 interested veterans were coming together and in the year 1952 they revived their group under the name Kaikokai in order to continue the traditions of the Imperial Japanese Army. However, on 28 December 1957, at the same time as the new organization was formally incorporated, they returned to their original name. By contrast, the Suikosha, which represented officers of the Imperial Japanese Navy before the war, also resurrected around the same time but changed its name permanently to Suikokai.

Because the Kaikosha was originally an organization for members of the Imperial Japanese Army, after the war full membership was limited to its veterans. However, the aging of the membership continued unabated and by 1992 the organization was down to 18,715 members, 500 of whom were passing away each year. Finally at a council meeting in the year 2001 the rules were amended and retired members of the air and ground wings of the Japan Self-Defense Forces became eligible for full membership.

Nonetheless, at the end of the year 2006 only about 630 former members of the JASDF or JGSDF were members, whereas Kaikosha's naval equivalent, the Suikokai had brought people associated with the Japan Maritime Self-Defense Force, including active members and their family, up to half of its total membership. However, Kaikosha finally went ahead and delved into the carrying on of its traditions while eyeing eagerly plans to revise the Japanese constitution. In April 2006 the Chief-of-Staff of the Ground Self-Defense Force released a message to each unit requesting them to help Kaikosha and within the year 2007 400 new members joined. At the end of March 2010 Kaikosha had 10,000 members of whom 1,000 were former members of the JASDF or JGSDF.

== Kaikosha buildings ==
Most Kaikosha buildings that survived the war still exist despite having been commandeered by SCAP during the subsequent occupation. Notable among them are the 7th Division's Asahikawa Kaikosha, which is today the Asahikawa Museum of Sculpture, the 8th Division's Hirosaki Kaikosha which is today a memorial hall open to the public, and the 11th Division's Zentsūji Kaikosha which is today used for a variety of purposes including as the site of placement exams for members of the Self-Defense Force, of regular recitals of the JSDF band, and of events and exchanges between local civilians and JSDF personnel, and there is even a Kaikosha Café in a separate building recently established beside the main building. All three of these buildings have received national recognition as Important Cultural Properties of Japan.

Also well-known are the Kanazawa Kaikosha which served as headquarters of the 9th Division and an annex of the Ishikawa prefectural government and was subsequently recognized by the prefecture as a tangible cultural property, and the 17th Division's Okayama Kaikosha which has been preserved as a valuable example of modern Japanese architecture and is today used for clubhouses as part of the Okayama prefecture's multipurpose grounds.

== Post-war chairmen of Kaikosha ==
Before the war, the chairmanship of Kaikosha was held concurrently by the incumbent Minister of War. After the war the chairmanship was held for a while by retired general officers including generals like former field marshal Shunroku Hata, but since the 1980s lower-ranking officers and officer cadets have held the post.

The most recent chairman was Takuma Yamamoto, an engineer and businessman who had served in succession as president, chairman, and honorary chairman of Fujitsu, and who was a second lieutenant in the Imperial Japanese Army and part of the 58th graduating class of the Imperial Japanese Army Air Force Academy.

Rank/Title	Chairmen	Years as chairman
General (IJA)	Suzuki Takao (12 December 1869 - 29 January 1964)	18 April 1954 – 20 July 1958
Marshal-General (IJA)	Hata Shunroku	21 July 1958 – 10 May 1962 (died in office)
General (IJA)	Yamawaki Masataka (2 March 1886 - 21 April 1974)	6 February 1963 – 28 January 1969
Lieutenant General (IJA)	Komoda Kōichi	29 January 1969 – 31 December 1974
Lieutenant General (IJA)	Tatsumi Eiichi (19 January 1895 - 17 February 1988)	1 January 1975 – 31 December 1978
Lieutenant General (JSDGF); Colonel (IJA)	Sugiyama Shigeru (28 April 1902 - 29 January 1982)	1 January 1979 – 31 December 1980
Lieutenant Colonel (IJA) Prince	Takeda Tsuneyoshi (4 March 1909 - 11 May 1992)	1 January 1981 – 31 December 1989

- Masatatsu Shirai： 1990 - 1993
- Takizō Hara： 1993 - 2005
- Akira Yakuyama： 2005
- Second Lieutenant (IJA) Takuma Yamamoto (11 September 1925 - 17 January 2012)： 2005 – 2012 (died in office)
- General (JSDGF) Atsushi Shima (1934 - ): 2012 -

== Other activities ==
=== The Yasukuni Archives ===
Kaikosha donated its old private libraries to Yasukuni Shrine and in 1999 the collection was opened to the public as the Yasukuni Archives. Yasukuni Shrine says that books donated from Suikokai, the naval equivalent of Kaikosha, are also included in the collection. It is explained on Yasukuni's official website that “The library maintains research material from the time that the souls that are resting at Yasukuni Shrine were killed in action and its purpose is to formally recognize their upstanding legacy as well as contribute to future research”.

=== Kaikosha and the Nanjing Massacre ===
In the 1980s Kaikosha published two volumes of documents and testimonies on the Battle of Nanjing, Nankinsen Shi ("The History of the Battle of Nanjing") and Nankinsen Shi Shiryōshū ("Collected Material on the History of the Battle of Nanjing"), which are recognized as valuable sources of information in the debate on the Nanjing Massacre. At first Kaikosha had begun compilation of the volumes with the intention of denying the so-called “Nanjing Incident,” but contrary to the wishes of the editorial staff, many testimonies come forward from people who saw or participated in massacres and they were left with no choice but to acknowledge this. Kaikosha admitted and apologized for the murder by the Japanese Army in Nanjing of what they estimated to be 3,000 to 6,000 Chinese.

=== Other research ===
Today Kaikosha publishes books, collections of imperial rescripts, collection of documents relating to military history, and their official newsletter, the Kaiko. In 2006 they released the book Taikoku Roshia ni Naze Katta no ka – Nichiro Senso no Shinjitsu ("Why did we defeat the great power Russia – The truth about the Russo-Japanese War").

In September 2009 a symposium on the Battles of Khalkhin Gol and its international background was hosted with the sponsorship of a Kaikosha modern research committee and the Military History Society of Japan
