= Borneo Theological Seminary =

- Formation: 1965
- Location: Sabah, East Malaysia
- Website: btssib.com

Borneo Theological Seminary (formerly known as the Maktab Teologi Sabah) was first established as the First Theological School (STP) in 1965, pioneered by Pta. Belize Mensiang. STP has issued more than 1,000 servants of God with the approval of the Theological Certificate by the SIB Sabah General Assembly in 1993.

BTS has been in operation for 15 years and has issued more than 538 graduates serving as Administrators, Pastors, Evangelists and Supervisors of the SIB Church and also in various church denominations in Malaysia. BTS is interdependent and willing to cooperate with other denominations and agencies within and outside the country. BTS under the administration of the BTS board and within the scope of Sabah SIB Education Department.

== Programs ==
BTS offers academic programs in the Malay language leading to awarding the following qualifications. It is one of the few theological colleges and seminaries in Malaysia that offers programs in Malay:

- Master of Arts In Missiology and Pastoral Counseling (M.A).
- Bachelor of Theology (B. TH), (4 Years).
- Diploma in Theology (3 Years).
- Theological Certificate (2 Years).
- Long Distance Theology (PTJJ).

== Accreditation ==
BTS is currently seeking accreditation from the Asia Theological Association.

== Affiliations ==
- Malaysian Association Theological School
- Presbyterian University and Theological Seminary
- Asia Theological Association
- Yayasan Pekabaran injil Indonesia
