= Ranau Sports Complex =

Sports venue in Ranau, Sabah, Malaysia

Ranau Sports Complex Kompleks Sukan Ranau
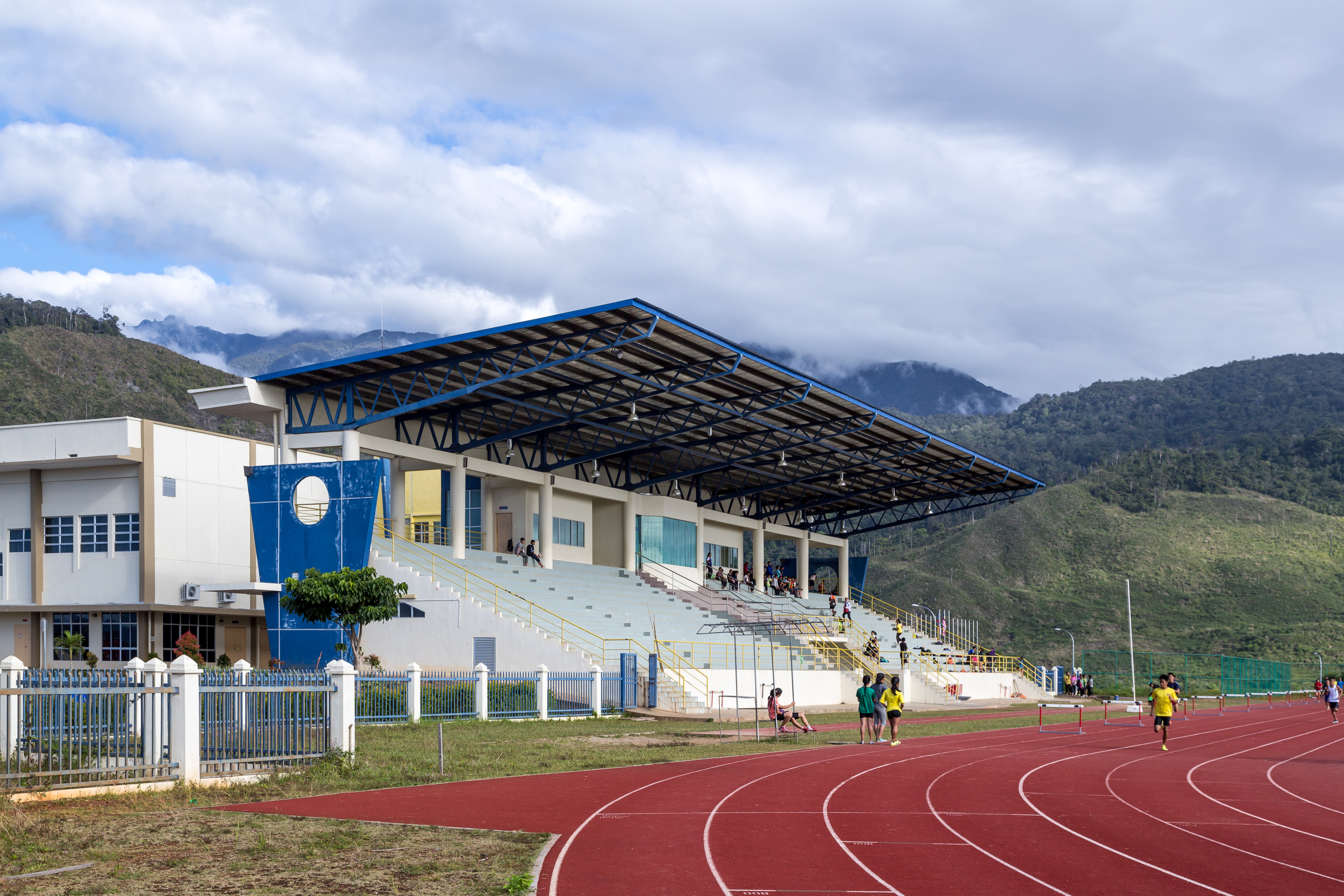
- Interactive map of Ranau Sports Complex; Kompleks Sukan Ranau
- Location: Ranau, Sabah, Malaysia
- Coordinates: 3°3′16.8″N 101°41′28.2″E
- Owner: Sabah Sports Board
- Capacity: <1000
- Surface: Grass pitch, tartan track
- Scoreboard: None

Construction
- Groundbreaking: unknown
- Built: 2005
- Opened: 2011
- Cost: unknown

Ranau Sports Complex (Malay: Kompleks Sukan Ranau) in Ranau, Sabah, Malaysia, located at an altitude of 780 m (2,560 ft) above the sea level, 8 km (5.0 mi) from Ranau town (pekan Ranau), is a <1000 capacity all-seater, multi-purpose stadium that was built in 2005.

== See also ==
- Sport in Malaysia
