= Clarence Elong Mansul =

Malaysian politician

Yang Berbahagia Datuk Clarence Elong Mansul PGDK

Deputy Minister of Energy, Telecommunications and Posts
- In office 1981–1983
- Monarch: Ahmad Shah
- Prime Minister: Mahathir Mohamad
- Minister: Leo Moggie
- Preceded by: Nik Hussein Wan Abdul Rahman
- Succeeded by: Abdul Rahim Abu Bakar

Member of the Malaysian Parliament for Penampang
- In office 1978–1986
- Preceded by: James Stephen Tibok
- Succeeded by: Bernard Giluk Dompok

Member of the Sabah State Legislative Assembly for Tamparuli
- In office 1983–1985
- Preceded by: James Peter Ongkili
- Succeeded by: Wilfred Bumburing

Personal details
- Born: Clarence Elong Mansul; 1940 Kampung Terawi, Putatan, Penampang, North Borneo (now Sabah)
- Died: 2 March 1999 (aged 58–59) General Hospital, Kuala Lumpur, Malaysia
- Resting place: St. Joseph's Benevolent Fund Roman Catholic Cemetery, 4½ Mile, Old Penampang Road, Kampung Dontozidon, Penampang, Sabah
- Citizenship: Malaysian
- Party: BERJAYA
- Other political affiliations: Barisan Nasional
- Occupation: Politician

Clarence Elong Mansul (1940–2 March 1999) was a Malaysian politician from BERJAYA. He was the Deputy Minister of Energy, Telecommunications and Posts from 1981 to 1983. He was also the Member of Parliament for Penampang from 1978 to 1986 and Member of Sabah State Legislative Assembly for Tamparuli from 1983 to 1985.

== Politics ==
Clarence was once a Deputy Chairman of the Kadazan Cultural Association (now known as the Kadazandusun Cultural Association).

== Election result ==
Parliament of Malaysia
Year	Constituency	Candidate	Votes	Pct.	Opponent(s)	Votes	Pct.	Ballots cast	Majority	Turnout
1978	Penampang	Clarence Elong Mansul (BERJAYA)	8,444	63.48%	Ignatius Stephen Malanjum (IND)	4,857	36.52%	13,301	3,587	69.18%
1982	Penampang	Clarence Elong Mansul (BERJAYA)	10,425	66.27%	Justine Jogumba Stimol (PASOK)	5,089	32.35%	15,730	5,336	67.21%

Sabah State Legislative Assembly
Year	Constituency	Candidate	Votes	Pct.	Opponent(s)	Votes	Pct.	Ballots cast	Majority	Turnout
1986	Petagas	Clarence Elong Mansul (BERJAYA)	866	11.42%	James Andrew Vitales (PBS)	4,935	65.11%	7,580	3,258	74.75%
1986	Petagas	Clarence Elong Mansul (BERJAYA)	866	11.42%	Thomas Fung Chik Tong (PCS)	1,677	22.12%	7,580	3,258	74.75%
1986	Petagas	Clarence Elong Mansul (BERJAYA)	866	11.42%	Peter Ho See Ming (PCBS)	64	0.84%	7,580	3,258	74.75%

== Health and death ==
He died on 2 March 1999, aged 59, after suffering a heart failure in Hospital Kuala Lumpur whilst campaigning for the 1999 Sabah state election as well as vacationing simultaneously with his family in Kuala Lumpur during that period and was survived by his widow, Datin Annie Kong (born 1948), eight children and several grandchildren as well as an elderly 77-year-old mother, Bridget Boluin Molijiu (1922–2013), who outlived him by 14 years aged 91.

== Honours ==
- Sabah
  - Commander of the Order of Kinabalu (PGDK) – Datuk
