= Kadamaian =

Malaysian political subdivision

Kadamaian (N11)
Sabah constituency

State constituency
- Legislature: Sabah State Legislative Assembly
MLA
Ewon Benedick
GRS
- Constituency created: 1984
- First contested: 1986
- Last contested: 2025

Demographics
- Electors (2025): 26,240

Kadamaian is a state constituency in Sabah, Malaysia, that is represented in the Sabah State Legislative Assembly.

== Demographics ==
As of 2020, Kadamaian has a population of 33,226 people.

Ethnic breakdown of Kadamaian's electorate as of 2025
1. Non-Muslim Bumiputera (85.0%)
2. Muslim Bumiputera (14.0%)
3. Other ethnicities (0.60%)
4. Chinese (0.40%)

== History ==
=== Polling districts ===
According to the gazette issued on 31 October 2022, the Kadamaian constituency has a total of 16 polling districts.

| State constituency | Polling Districts | Code | Location |
|---|---|---|---|
| Kadamaian (N11) | Kelawat | 169/11/01 | SK Kelawat |
| Kadamaian (N11) | Kinasaraban | 169/11/02 | SK Kinasaraban Kota Belud |
| Kadamaian (N11) | Tamu Darat | 169/11/03 | SK Tamu Darat |
| Kadamaian (N11) | Piasau | 169/11/04 | SK Piasau |
| Kadamaian (N11) | Tangkurus | 169/11/05 | SK Tengkurus |
| Kadamaian (N11) | Lasau | 169/11/06 | SK Lasau Podi |
| Kadamaian (N11) | Sayap | 169/11/07 | SK Sayap |
| Kadamaian (N11) | Taginambur | 169/11/08 | SMK Narinang |
| Kadamaian (N11) | Narinang | 169/11/09 | SK Narinang |
| Kadamaian (N11) | Kebayau | 169/11/10 | SK Kebayau |
| Kadamaian (N11) | Kiau | 169/11/11 | SK Kiau 1 |
| Kadamaian (N11) | Gaur-Gaur | 169/11/12 | SK Mongkulat |
| Kadamaian (N11) | Tambulian | 169/11/13 | SK Tambulion |
| Kadamaian (N11) | Nahaba | 169/11/14 | SK Nahaba |
| Kadamaian (N11) | Melangkap | 169/11/15 | SK Melangkap Kota Belud |
| Kadamaian (N11) | Kaung | 169/11/16 | SK Kaung |

=== Representation history ===
Member of Sabah State Legislative Assembly for Kadamaian
| Assembly | No | Years | Member | Party |
Constituency created from Usukan, Tempasuk and Kebayau
| 7th | N09 | 1985 – 1986 | Baggai Basirun | PBS |
| 8th | N09 | 1986 – 1990 | Baggai Basirun | PBS |
| 9th | N09 | 1990 – 1994 | Baggai Basirun | GR (PBS) |
| 10th | N09 | 1994 | Baggai Basirun | GR (PBS) |
| 10th | N09 | 1994 – 1999 | Baggai Basirun | BN (PDS) |
| 11th | N07 | 1999 – 2002 | Timbun Lagadan | PBS |
| 11th | N07 | 2002–2004 | Timbun Lagadan | BN (PBS) |
| 12th | N07 | 2004 – 2008 | Timbun Lagadan | BN (PBS) |
| 13th | N07 | 2008 – 2013 | Timbun Lagadan | BN (PBS) |
| 14th | N07 | 2013 | Jeremy Ukoh Malajad | PKR |
| 14th | N07 | 2013 – 2018 | Jeremy Ukoh Malajad | Independent |
| 15th | N07 | 2018 | Ewon Benedick | BN (UPKO) |
| 15th | N07 | 2018 – 2020 | Ewon Benedick | UPKO |
| 16th | N11 | 2020 – 2021 | Ewon Benedick | UPKO |
| 16th | N11 | 2021 – 2025 | Ewon Benedick | PH (UPKO) |
| 17th | N11 | 2025–2026 | Ewon Benedick | UPKO |
| 17th | N11 | 2026–present | Ewon Benedick | GRS (UPKO) |

== Election results ==
Sabah state election, 2025: Kadamaian
| Party | Candidate | Votes | % | ∆% |
|---|---|---|---|---|
| UPKO | Ewon Benedick | 11,977 | 65.60 | ▲15.36 |
| GRS | Mudezam Muyau @ James Muyou | 2,305 | 12.62 | ▲12.62 |
| Heritage | Norman Simon | 2,222 | 12.17 | ▲12.17 |
| Homeland Solidarity Party | Davylandon Rubbin | 981 | 5.37 | ▲5.37 |
| KDM | Josely Taising | 564 | 3.09 | ▲3.09 |
| PBM | Judin Tingih | 84 | 0.46 | ▲0.46 |
| Sabah Dream Party | Daibi Mandadi | 74 | 0.41 | ▲0.41 |
| Sabah Native Co-operation Party | Priskilia Akwila Senim | 52 | 0.28 | ▲0.28 |
| Total valid votes | | 18,259 | | |
| Total rejected ballots | | 210 | | |
| Unreturned ballots | | 26 | | |
| Turnout | | 18,495 | 70.48 | ▼3.87 |
| Registered electors | | 26,240 | | |
| Majority | | 9,672 | 52.98 | ▼27.51 |
| UPKO hold | | Swing | | |
Source(s) "RESULTS OF CONTESTED ELECTION AND STATEMENTS OF THE POLL AFTER THE OFFICIAL ADDITION OF VOTES" (PDF).

Sabah state election, 2020: Kadamaian
| Party | Candidate | Votes | % | ∆% |
|---|---|---|---|---|
| UPKO | Ewon Benedick | 6,823 | 50.24 | ▲50.24 |
| PBS | Demis Rumanti | 3,364 | 24.77 | ▲24.77 |
| BN | Duanis Mogirong | 2,050 | 15.09 | ▼31.55 |
| Love Sabah Party | Beting Giling | 799 | 5.88 | ▼0.69 |
| LDP | Leduning Lengik | 223 | 1.64 | ▲1.64 |
| Independent | Raiting Mohd Farhan | 101 | 0.74 | ▲0.74 |
| Total valid votes | | 13,360 | 98.38 | |
| Total rejected ballots | | 175 | 1.29 | |
| Unreturned ballots | | 47 | 0.35 | |
| Turnout | | 13,582 | 74.35 | ▼10.58 |
| Registered electors | | 13,360 | | |
| Majority | | 3,459 | 25.47 | ▲3.08 |
| UPKO gain from BN | | Swing | | ? |
Source(s) "RESULTS OF CONTESTED ELECTION AND STATEMENTS OF THE POLL AFTER THE OFFICIAL ADDITION OF VOTES".

Sabah state election, 2018: Kadamaian
| Party | Candidate | Votes | % | ∆% |
|---|---|---|---|---|
| BN | Ewon Benedick | 6,861 | 46.64 | ▲10.08 |
| PKR | Lukia Indan | 3,567 | 24.25 | ▼18.82 |
| STAR | Rubbin Guribah | 3,034 | 20.62 | ▲6.86 |
| Love Sabah Party | Mail Bilinu | 764 | 5.19 | ▲5.19 |
| PAS | Satail Manjungkat | 129 | 0.88 | ▲0.88 |
| Total valid votes | | 14,355 | 97.57 | |
| Total rejected ballots | | 251 | 1.71 | |
| Unreturned ballots | | 106 | 0.72 | |
| Turnout | | 14,712 | 84.93 | ▼0.87 |
| Registered electors | | 17,982 | | |
| Majority | | 3,294 | 22.39 | ▲15.88 |
| BN gain from PKR | | Swing | | ? |
Source(s) "RESULTS OF CONTESTED ELECTION AND STATEMENTS OF THE POLL AFTER THE OFFICIAL ADDITION OF VOTES".

Sabah state election, 2013: Kadamaian
| Party | Candidate | Votes | % | ∆% |
|---|---|---|---|---|
| PKR | Jeremmy Ukoh Malajad | 5,877 | 43.07 | ▲14.79 |
| BN | Timbun Lagadan | 4,988 | 36.56 | ▼15.75 |
| STAR | Rubbin Guribah | 1,877 | 13.76 | ▲13.76 |
| SAPP | Peter Marajin @ Peter Marazing | 547 | 4.01 | ▲4.01 |
| Total valid votes | | 13,289 | 97.39 | |
| Total rejected ballots | | 301 | 2.21 | |
| Unreturned ballots | | 55 | 0.40 | |
| Turnout | | 13,645 | 85.80 | ▲6.44 |
| Registered electors | | 15,903 | | |
| Majority | | 889 | 6.51 | ▼17.52 |
| PKR gain from BN | | Swing | | ? |
Source(s) "KEPUTUSAN PILIHAN RAYA UMUM DEWAN UNDANGAN NEGERI". Archived from the original on 2022-06-21.

Sabah state election, 2008: Kadamaian
| Party | Candidate | Votes | % | ∆% |
|---|---|---|---|---|
| BN | Timbun Lagadan | 5,382 | 52.31 | ▼2.36 |
| PKR | Lukia Indan | 2,909 | 28.28 | ▲28.28 |
| Independent | Peter Marajin @ Peter Marazing | 1,729 | 16.81 | ▲16.81 |
| Total valid votes | | 10,020 | 97.40 | |
| Total rejected ballots | | 268 | 2.60 | |
| Unreturned ballots | | 0 | 0.00 | |
| Turnout | | 10,288 | 79.36 | ▲4.14 |
| Registered electors | | 12,964 | | |
| Majority | | 2,473 | 24.03 | ▼10.56 |
| BN hold | | Swing | | |
Source(s) "KEPUTUSAN PILIHAN RAYA UMUM DEWAN UNDANGAN NEGERI SABAH BAGI TAHUN 2008".

Sabah state election, 2004: Kadamaian
| Party | Candidate | Votes | % | ∆% |
|---|---|---|---|---|
| BN | Timbun Lagadan | 5,019 | 54.67 | ▲26.08 |
| Independent | Maidom @ Paul Pansai | 1,844 | 20.08 | ▲20.08 |
| Independent | Daibi Mandadi | 1,652 | 17.99 | ▲17.99 |
| Independent | Johnny @ Lyon Gilong | 256 | 2.79 | ▲2.79 |
| SETIA | Sabagang @ Handry Rumpit | 171 | 1.86 | ▲1.86 |
| Total valid votes | | 8,771 | 95.53 | |
| Total rejected ballots | | 239 | 2.60 | |
| Unreturned ballots | | 0 | 0.00 | |
| Turnout | | 9,181 | 75.22 | ▼7.41 |
| Registered electors | | 12,206 | | |
| Majority | | 3,175 | 34.59 | ▼5.88 |
| BN gain from PBS | | Swing | | ? |
Source(s) "KEPUTUSAN PILIHAN RAYA UMUM DEWAN UNDANGAN NEGERI SABAH BAGI TAHUN 2004".

Sabah state election, 1999: Kadamaian
| Party | Candidate | Votes | % | ∆% |
|---|---|---|---|---|
| PBS | Timbun Lagadan | 6,583 | 69.06 | ▲1.88 |
| BN | Baggai Basirun | 2,725 | 28.59 | ▲1.14 |
| BERSEKUTU | Lidu @ Serirama Johari | 151 | 1.58 | ▲1.58 |
| Total valid votes | | 9,459 | 99.23 | |
| Total rejected ballots | | 73 | 0.77 | |
| Unreturned ballots | | 0 | 0.00 | |
| Turnout | | 9,532 | 82.63 | ▼2.69 |
| Registered electors | | 11,536 | | |
| Majority | | 3,858 | 40.47 | ▲0.74 |
| PBS hold | | Swing | | |
Source(s) "KEPUTUSAN PILIHAN RAYA UMUM DEWAN UNDANGAN NEGERI SABAH BAGI TAHUN 1999".

Sabah state election, 1994: Kadamaian
| Party | Candidate | Votes | % | ∆% |
|---|---|---|---|---|
| PBS | Baggai Basirun | 5,127 | 67.18 | ▲2.76 |
| BN | Awadnir Matanggal | 2,095 | 27.45 | ▲27.45 |
| Independent | Sebagang Rumit @ Handry | 312 | 4.09 | ▲4.09 |
| Independent | Meisin Sendelun @ Robert | 23 | 0.30 | ▲0.30 |
| Independent | Sindeh Teliban | 9 | 0.12 | ▲0.12 |
| Total valid votes | | 7,566 | 99.14 | |
| Total rejected ballots | | 66 | 0.86 | |
| Unreturned ballots | | 0 | 0.00 | |
| Turnout | | 7,632 | 85.32 | ▼0.68 |
| Registered electors | | 8,945 | | |
| Majority | | 3,032 | 39.73 | ▼8.22 |
| PBS hold | | Swing | | |
Source(s) "KEPUTUSAN PILIHAN RAYA UMUM DEWAN UNDANGAN NEGERI SABAH BAGI TAHUN 1994".

Sabah state election, 1990: Kadamaian
| Party | Candidate | Votes | % | ∆% |
|---|---|---|---|---|
| PBS | Baggai Basirun | 4,419 | 64.42 | ▲0.76 |
| USNO | Awadnir Matanggal | 1,130 | 16.47 | ▲16.47 |
| Sabah People's Party | Yapin Gimpoton | 935 | 13.63 | ▲13.63 |
| AKAR | Meisin Sendelun @ Robert | 204 | 2.97 | ▲2.97 |
| BERJAYA | Manik Tanggau | 60 | 0.87 | ▼34.43 |
| Total valid votes | | 6,688 | 97.49 | |
| Total rejected ballots | | 112 | 1.63 | |
| Unreturned ballots | | 0 | 0.00 | |
| Turnout | | 6,860 | 86.00 | ▲1.67 |
| Registered electors | | 7,977 | | |
| Majority | | 3,289 | 47.95 | ▲19.59 |
| PBS hold | | Swing | | |
Source(s) "KEPUTUSAN PILIHAN RAYA UMUM DEWAN UNDANGAN NEGERI SABAH BAGI TAHUN 1990".

Sabah state election, 1986: Kadamaian
| Party | Candidate | Votes | % | ∆% |
|---|---|---|---|---|
| PBS | Baggai Basirun | 3,737 | 64.33 | ▲15.57 |
| BERJAYA | Yapin Gimpoton | 2,072 | 35.67 | ▲3.02 |
| Total valid votes | | 5,809 | 100.00 | |
| Total rejected ballots | | 61 | | |
| Unreturned ballots | | 0 | | |
| Turnout | | 5,870 | 84.33 | ▼0.39 |
| Registered electors | | 6,961 | | |
| Majority | | 1,665 | 28.66 | ▲12.55 |
| PBS hold | | Swing | | |
Source(s) "KEPUTUSAN PILIHAN RAYA UMUM DEWAN UNDANGAN NEGERI SABAH BAGI TAHUN 1986".

Sabah state election, 1985: Kadamaian
| Party | Candidate | Votes | % |
|---|---|---|---|
| PBS | Baggai Basirun | 2,624 | 48.76 |
| BERJAYA | Yapin Gimpoton | 1,757 | 32.65 |
| USNO | Jaintin Molondoi | 618 | 11.48 |
| PASOK | Soleten Sompong | 249 | 4.63 |
| Independent | Ismail Gimbad | 70 | 1.30 |
| BERSEPADU | Melon Asik | 63 | 1.17 |
| Total valid votes | | 5,381 | 100.00 |
| Total rejected ballots | | 131 | |
| Unreturned ballots | | 0 | |
| Turnout | | 5,512 | 84.72 |
| Registered electors | | 6,506 | |
| Majority | | 867 | 16.11 |
This was a new constituency created
