= James Peter Ongkili =

Malaysian politician

Yang Berbahagia Datuk Dr. James Peter Ongkili PGDK DIMP
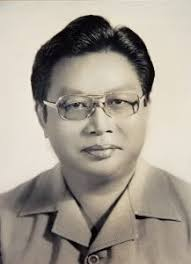
- Datuk Dr. James Peter Ongkili

Member of the Malaysian Parliament for Tuaran
- In office 1978–1986
- Preceded by: Buja Gumbilai
- Succeeded by: Kalakau Untol

Member of the Sabah State Legislative Assembly for Tamparuli
- In office 1976–1983
- Preceded by: New constituency
- Succeeded by: Clarence Elong Mansul

Personal details
- Born: James Peter Julitih Ongkili; 13 March 1939 Kampung Karanaan, Tambunan, North Borneo
- Died: 20 March 2006 (aged 67) Queen Elizabeth Hospital, Kota Kinabalu, Sabah
- Resting place: Bukit Aman Villa, Kiulu, Tamparuli, Tuaran
- Citizenship: Malaysian
- Party: BERJAYA (till 1988); PRS (1988-1991); PBS (1991–2006)
- Other political affiliations: Barisan Nasional (1976-1986, since 2002)
- Spouse: Margaret Kuyang Ganduong
- Relations: Maximus Ongkili (brother); Joseph Pairin Kitingan (uncle); Jeffrey Kitingan (uncle)
- Education: University of Queensland; University of Malaya
- Occupation: Politician

James Peter Julitih Ongkili (13 March 1939 – 20 March 2006) was a Malaysian politician. He was the Minister in the Prime Minister's Department (Law and Parliamentary) from 1983 to 1986 and Deputy Chief Minister of Sabah from 1976 to 1981. He was also the Member of Sabah State Legislative Assembly for Tamparuli from 1976 to 1981 and Member of Parliament for Tuaran from 1978 to 1986.

== Family ==
James was born on 13 March 1939 in Kampung Karanaan, Tambunan, Sabah to a police officer, Alexius @ Alexander Ongkili Indoh, Snr. (1910–1991), who hailed from the neighboring village of Kampung Lintuhun (hitherto then was on home leave at the time of his birth after serving in the Royal Malaysia Police Sabah contingent headquarters, only to be reassigned in other districts such as Kota Marudu and Keningau, then known as the British North Borneo Constabulary in Kota Kinabalu), but later acquired land and settled in Keningau (in the village of Kampung Ria/Lingkudau) after his retirement from the police force and a housewife, Battindoi Kondilab Komboon (1915–1986), a native of the said village who was also a much older patrilineal female first cousin to Sabah politicians, Joseph Pairin Kitingan and his brother Jeffrey Gapari.

His widow, Datin Margaret Kuyang Ganduong (born 1 October 1937), was a native of Tamparuli (from the village of Kiulu, but hailed ancestrally from another village known as Kauluan, located in the outskirts of the Tamparuli sub-district of Tuaran) and the couple are blessed with 6 children and 15 grandchildren as a result of their 47 years marriage from 1959 (they wed on his 20th birthday celebrations of that year whilst his wife was then 21 years and 5 months old, only to turn 22 years in October of that year, for she was a year or two senior than her late husband) until his own death in 2006 due to stroke. His brother, Maximus Ongkili was a federal minister from 2004 to 2022 and has been the President of United Sabah Party since 2017.

== Education ==
He firstly attended St. Theresa's Primary School, Tondulu and St. Martin's Secondary School, Tampasak, both located in his hometown of Tambunan and later attended St. Francis Xavier's Secondary School, Keningau for his upper secondary education stage and later completed his sixth form in La Salle Secondary School Tanjung Aru, Kota Kinabalu. In addition, he also holds a Bachelor of Arts degree from University of Queensland and a PhD from the University of Malaya.

== Early career ==
After completing his secondary education, he worked firstly as an untrained substitute teacher in St. John's School, Tuaran whilst waiting for his examination results. Then with a Colombo Plan scholarship, he later furthered his studies at the University of Queensland in Australia.

He began his career as a district officer in Kinabatangan from 1965 to 1967 and later in Keningau from 1967 to 1969. In addition, he served as a lecturer in University of Malaya from 1969 to 1976.

== Politics ==
In April 1976, James contested for the Tamparuli state seat on the ticket of BERJAYA and was appointed as the Sabah State Minister of Agriculture and Fisheries. Later, he was then appointed as the Second Deputy Chief Minister of Sabah cum State Minister of Industrial and Rural Development on 17 July 1976. On 18 March 1977, he was elected as the Deputy President of BERJAYA. In the 1978 general election, he contested for the Tuaran federal seat.

On 2 June 1983, he was appointed as a Minister in the Prime Minister's Department (in charge of Parliamentary Affairs and Law) and became the ex-officio Minister of Justice on 14 July 1984 under Prime Minister Mahathir Mohamad.

In July 1986, he announced that he was retiring from politics and in May 1988, he quitted BERJAYA. However, two months later, he established Sabah People's Party and became the first president of the party. In July 1990, he contested in the 1990 Sabah state election for the Tamparuli state seat on a PRS ticket but he lost to Wilfred Bumburing from PBS. On 1 August 1990, he announced his retirement as President of PRS and from the political arena. But in March 1991, he made a decision by joining PBS, the party that was founded by his uncle, Joseph Pairin Kitingan.

== Election result ==
Parliament of Malaysia
Year	Constituency	Candidate	Votes	Pct.	Opponent(s)	Votes	Pct.	Ballots cast	Majority	Turnout
1978	Tuaran	James Peter Ongkili (BERJAYA)	8,166	69.46%	Mohamed Abdul Rahman (PUSAKA)	3,591	30.54%	11,757	4,575	68.72%
1982	Tuaran	James Peter Ongkili (BERJAYA)	9,606	70.80%	James Arab (PASOK)	2,944	21.70%	13,568	6,662	68.74
1982	Tuaran	James Peter Ongkili (BERJAYA)	9,606	70.80%	Madrus Yunus (IND)	485	3.57%	13,568	6,662	68.74
1982	Tuaran	James Peter Ongkili (BERJAYA)	9,606	70.80%	Alim Sugara (PUSAKA)	272	2.00%	13,568	6,662	68.74

Sabah State Legislative Assembly
Year	Constituency	Candidate	Votes	Pct.	Opponent(s)	Votes	Pct.	Ballots cast	Majority	Turnout
1976	Tamparuli	James Peter Ongkili (BERJAYA)	2,775	66.31%	Jasnie Gindug (USNO)	1,180	28.20%	4,185	1,595	83.73%
1976	Tamparuli	James Peter Ongkili (BERJAYA)	2,775	66.31%	Maria Gontuong (IND)	151	3.61%	4,185	1,595	83.73%
1976	Tamparuli	James Peter Ongkili (BERJAYA)	2,775	66.31%	Jemis Arab (BERSATU)	25	0.60%	4,185	1,595	83.73%
1981	Tamparuli	James Peter Ongkili (BERJAYA)	3,503	69.75%	Amisah Borhan (USNO)	944	19.80%	5,022	2,559	81.90%
1981	Tamparuli	James Peter Ongkili (BERJAYA)	3,503	69.75%	Wilfred Bumburing (PASOK)	441	8.78%	5,022	2,559	81.90%
1981	Tamparuli	James Peter Ongkili (BERJAYA)	3,503	69.75%	Mohamed Abdul Rahman (PUSAKA)	47	0.94%	5,022	2,559	81.90%
1990	Tamparuli	James Peter Ongkili (PRS)	748	11.25%	Wilfred Bumburing (PBS)	4,971	74.77%	6,648	4,223	81.93%
1990	Tamparuli	James Peter Ongkili (PRS)	748	11.25%	Nori Lumpisau (USNO)	638	9.60%	6,648	4,223	81.93%
1990	Tamparuli	James Peter Ongkili (PRS)	748	11.25%	Mohd Raji Mandaili (AKAR)	144	2.17%	6,648	4,223	81.93%
1990	Tamparuli	James Peter Ongkili (PRS)	748	11.25%	Johnny Tanggar (BERJAYA)	80	1.20%	6,648	4,223	81.93%

== Health ==
As a result of stroke attacks, he used a wheelchair for 10 years and had to consume 6 different types of medication after suffering a third stage stroke. He died at Queen Elizabeth Hospital, Kota Kinabalu on 20 March 2006, aged 67, just after a week celebrating his penultimate birthday and also his last 47th wedding anniversary. His funeral was held in the Catholic Church of St. John the Evangelist, Kampung Labuaya, Tuaran on 22 March and was buried right in the front courtyard of his house at Bukit Aman Villa, Kiulu, Tamparuli, Tuaran.

== Honours ==
- Pahang
  - Knight Companion of the Order of the Crown of Pahang (DIMP) – Dato' (1976)
- Sabah
  - Commander of the Order of Kinabalu (PGDK) – Datuk (1978)
