= Gaisah =

Gaisah is a surname. Notable people with the surname include:

- Ignisious Gaisah (born 1983), Ghanaian-born long jumper
- John Gaisah (1955–1981), Malaysia-based artist
