= Kiulu, Malaysia =

Kiulu
- Town and Sub-district of Tuaran
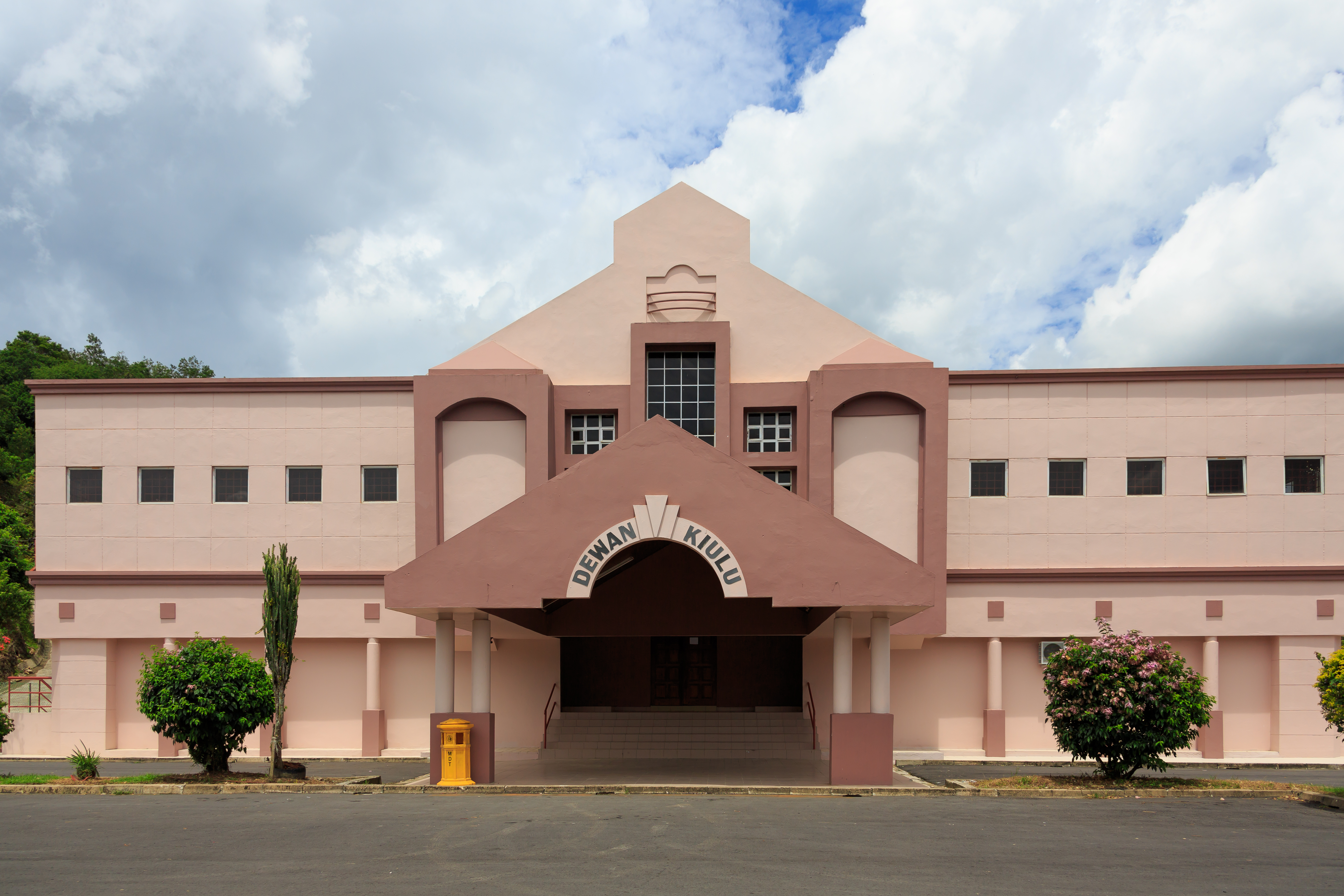
- Kiulu Hall

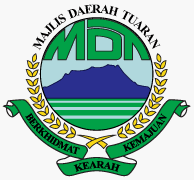
- Seal
- Etymology: Tree 'Tulu' (Small Bamboo) in Dusun
- Location of Kiulu Town in Tuaran District

- Location within Sabah
- Coordinates: 6°03′31″N 116°16′54″E
- Country: Malaysia
- State: Sabah
- Division: West Coast
- District: Tuaran
- Administration: Tuaran District Council

Government
  - Body: Kiulu Sub-district Office
  - Assistant District Officer: Leprus Giswa Esuvas
  - DUN: Yang Berhormat Datuk Joniston Bangkuai (GRS-PBS) (Kiulu)

Population (2020)
  - Total: 17,408
- Population around Kiulu
- Time zone: MST
- Postal code: 89250
- Area code: 088
- Neighborhood Area: Tamparuli, Telipok, Inanam
- Tamu (Weekly Local Market): Tuesday
- Website: https://pdkkiulu.sabah.gov.my/index.php

Kiulu is a small town and sub-district located on the West Coast Division of Sabah, Malaysia, under the Tuaran district. The Kiulu area is known for its unique natural beauty, including its flora and fauna, with a river flowing along the route from the town towards Tamparuli town. This area has become a popular tourist destination in the Tuaran district, offering various interesting spots and a wide range of activities to enjoy. Kiulu town is situated 47 kilometers from Kota Kinabalu and 23 kilometers from Tuaran town. Kiulu was formerly a mukim under the sub-district of Tamparuli until 2018.

== Infrastructure ==
Kiulu act as a strategic settlement stop for a remote road from Tamparuli. To connect further to other places, a new bridge (such as the Bayag Bridge) was developed to connect certain areas and village, alongside a new road that connects to Telipok, Ranau and Tambunan, which was characterized by steep, rugged, mountainous terrain, managed by the Crocker Range. Another interior highway which connects to Kampung Tudan is used to connect the Tuaran area to both Penampang and Tambunan.

Kiulu was also planning to have a building constructed to expand its township, and will have potential hill paddy hub.

== Notable people ==
- Wilfred Madius Tangau - current Tuaran member of parliament and also incumbent Tamparuli state assemblyman since 2025
- Joniston Bangkuai - incumbent state assemblyman for Kiulu since 2013
- Henry Saimpon - former Sabah FA football player
- James Peter Ongkili - former Tuaran member of parliament from 1978 to 1986, Minister in the Prime Minister's Department (Law and Parliamentary Affairs) from 1981 to 1983, Deputy Chief Minister from 1976 to 1981 and former Sabah state assemblyman for Tamparuli from 1976 to 1981 (only resided in this town whilst representing the said seats during his political career but remained even after leaving politics for it is also his wife, Datin Margaret Ganduong Ongkili's abode as her family resides in this town, as he originally is a native of Tambunan)
