= Tamparuli =

- Town and Sub-district

Other transcription(s)
  - Jawi: تمڤارولي
  - Simplified Chinese: 担波罗里
  - Traditional Chinese: 擔波羅里
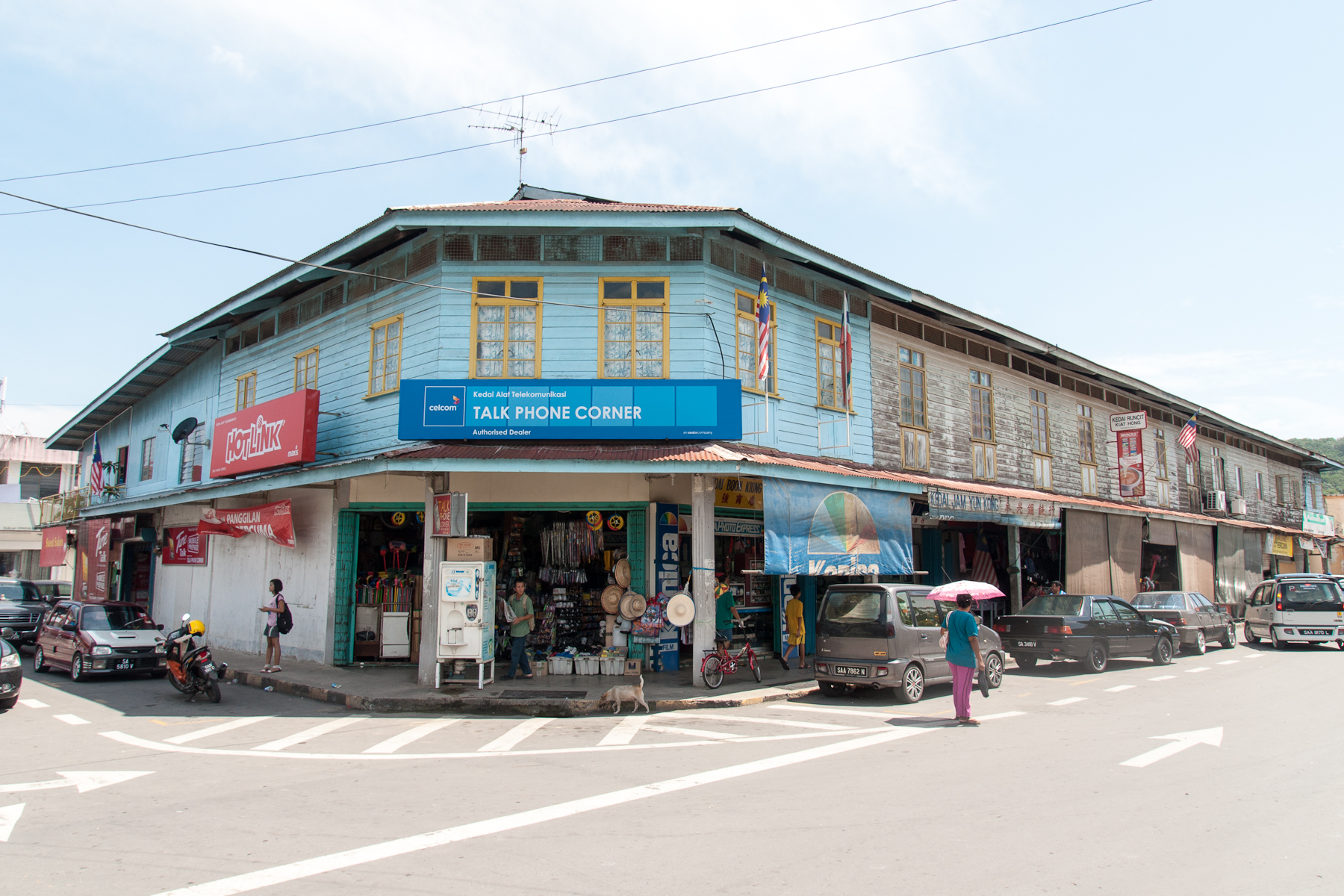
- Colonial-era shoplots in downtown Tamparuli

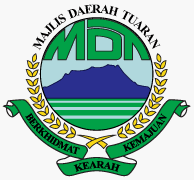
- Seal
- Etymology: Temporary suspension bridge
- Location of Tamparuli Town in Tuaran District

- Location within Borneo
- Coordinates: 6°8′N 116°16′E
- Country: Malaysia
- State: Sabah
- Division: West Coast
- District: Tuaran
- Administration: Tuaran District Council

Government
  - Body: Tamparuli Sub-district Office
  - Assistant District Officer: Hannevy W Harry
  - DUN: Yang Berhormat Datuk Seri Panglima Wilfred Madius Tangau (UPKO)

Area
  - Total: 499.00 km^{2} (192.665 sq mi)

Population (2020)
  - Total: 40,502
- The population around Tamparuli only and does not include the whole sub-district of Tamparuli.
- Time zone: UTC+8 (MST)
- Postal code: 8925X
- Area code: 088
- Neighborhood Area: Tuaran, Topokon, Kiulu, Pekan Nabalu
- Tamu (Weekly Local Market): Wednesday
- Website: ww2.sabah.gov.my/dktmp/

Tamparuli is a town and sub-district located in the Tuaran District of Sabah, Malaysia, on the island of Borneo. It is approximately 38 kilometres northeast of Kota Kinabalu, the state capital of Sabah. The town is known for its scenic landscapes, which include hills, rivers, and surrounding rural areas, making it a picturesque location. It is famous for its proximity to the Tamparuli Suspension Bridge, a popular tourist attraction. The Tamparuli Suspension Bridge became even more iconic after the creation of the "Tamparuli Bridge Song" by Justin Lusah. Tamparuli is also known for its local culture and is a gateway for visitors heading to the highlands, such as the popular Kundasang area and Mount Kinabalu. The town is known for its food, especially the "Tamparuli Noodles," a local delicacy. It also serves as a stop on the way to Kiulu, a popular whitewater rafting destination for domestic and international tourists.

The convenience of the new Tamparuli Point shopping site is helping Tamparuli grow. The most famous landmark in Tamparuli is a long hanging bridge; another bridge built safer and more compatible for motor traffic spans the river far below the hanging bridge and is flooded during heavy rain. A portion of the motor bridge was destroyed by floods in 1954 but was built not long after.

== Etymology ==
The origin of the name Tamparuli has been explained through various stories shared by locals over the years. The most popular version suggests that the town was named after a suspension bridge built by an unnamed British officer. A temporary bridge had been constructed to replace an older one that was damaged by a flood. The British officer reportedly turned to the villagers and said, “This bridge is temporary.” Over time, the word temporary was gradually adapted by the locals and eventually evolved into Tamparuli.

Others version from the year 1942 until the year 1944, the Tamparuli area was used by the Japanese military as a base for heavy vehicles such as trucks. Then, the local people called that area are known as 'Tempat Lori' means truck place and, eventually, it turned called Tamparuli. Next, according to another source, the Tamparuli town also derives a name from words know as slapped by water and, this name derives from Brunei's word, due Brunei traders who came to Tamparuli had trouble to get up to the upstream because of the high water flow. As with many place names, the exact origin may not be fully certain, but these interpretations give a sense of how the name might relate to the local geography, culture, or history.

== History ==
=== Origins of Tamparuli town ===
Tamparuli town known was as called "Bontoi" (actually referring to a small village in that area) and, "Bontoi" of village name means a bridge believed to have existed for over 200 years long before it was named Tamparuli. From a small village, Tamparuli later evolved into a town. The change came after several outside traders, especially among Chinese people from Tuaran, set up some lumber shops in the 1930s. Tamparuli Town is believed to have been established and developed on the site of a former rubber plantation by a group of Chinese families around the 1920s to 1930s. The town was also built by the riverbank near a place called Bontoi and became a parking spot for lorries at night during the Japanese occupation. During the British occupation, the first wooden shop houses in Tamparuli town were built in 1946, a year after World War II. The historic Tamparuli shop houses, which are inscribed on the concrete, are believed to have been completed on 5 September 1954, three years before the Independence of Malaya in 1957.

=== Memorial Monuments ===
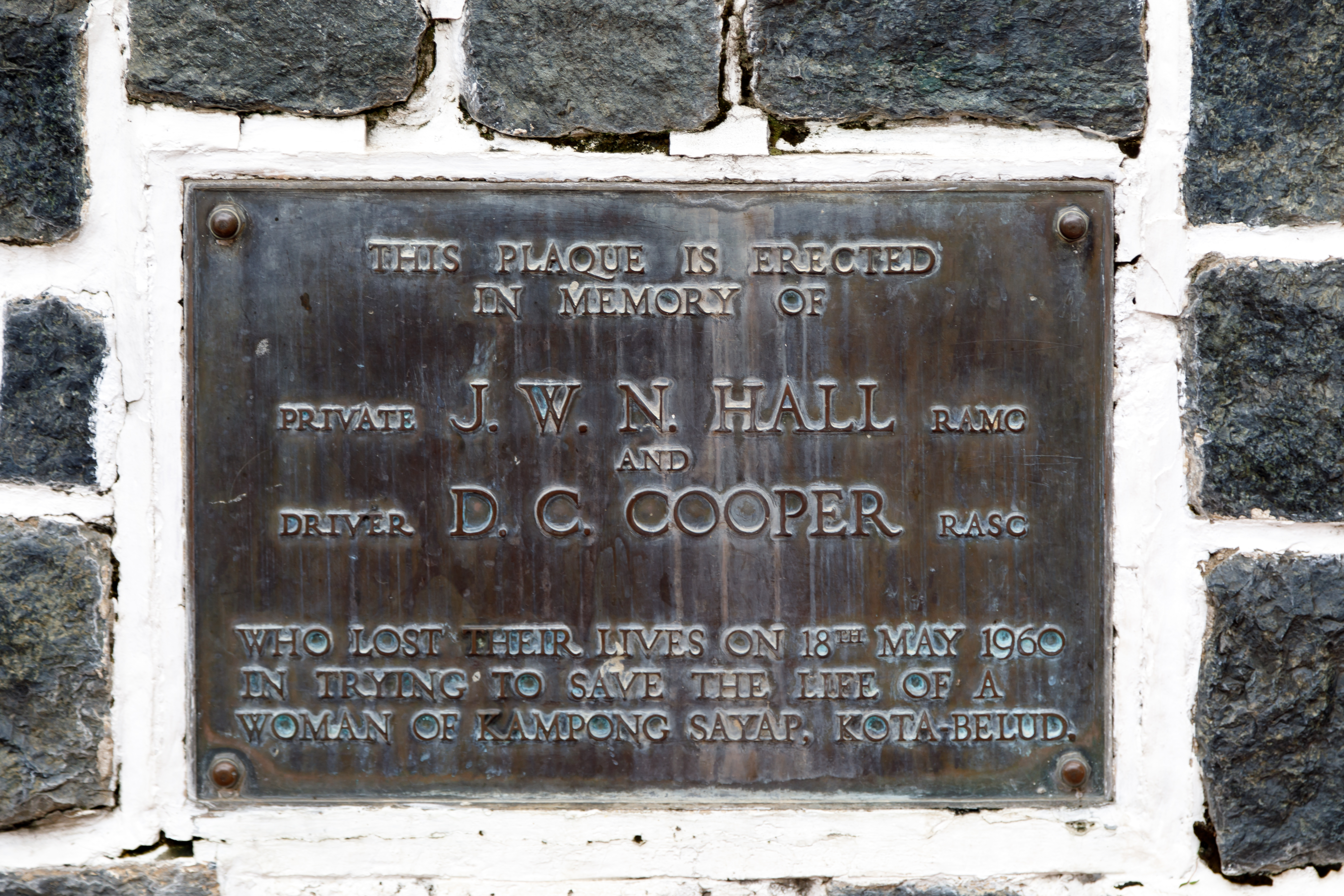
Plaque of Memorial Monuments

There is a monument believed to be over 60 years old built near the market in Tamparuli town. According to historical sources, the purpose of the monument was to commemorate two British soldiers who died in a nearby river during a Land Rover four-wheel drive that they crossed across the Tamparuli bridge on 18 May 1960. The dead British soldier named JWN Hall of the Royal Health Corps and a driver, DC Cooper of the Royal Service Corps based at Paradise Camp, Kota Belud. The unfortunate tragedy occurred when two soldiers were on their way to send a severely injured woman from Kampung Sayap, Kota Belud to a hospital in Jesselton. At that time, the vehicle was in the middle of a bridge and an unexpected stream of currents had occurred causing the vehicle to drift. The bodies of the three victims were found with two still in the four-wheel-drive Land Rover that was swept away by the current. Three days later, two British soldiers were buried in the army cemetery at Paradise Camp in Kota Belud. The monument is also one of the visitors' places of interest in the town of Tamparuli.

== Administration ==
=== Tuaran District Council ===
The small district of Tamparuli is still under the administration of the Tuaran District Council in Sabah, Malaysia. Although Tamparuli is often regarded as a small district or town, it is still managed by the Tuaran District Council for administrative and public service matters. The Tuaran District Council is responsible for various aspects of management and development in the area, including infrastructure, cleanliness, and urban planning. Tamparuli, with its strategic location near the state capital of Kota Kinabalu, also plays an important role in the economy and culture of Sabah.

=== Tamparuli Sub-District Office ===
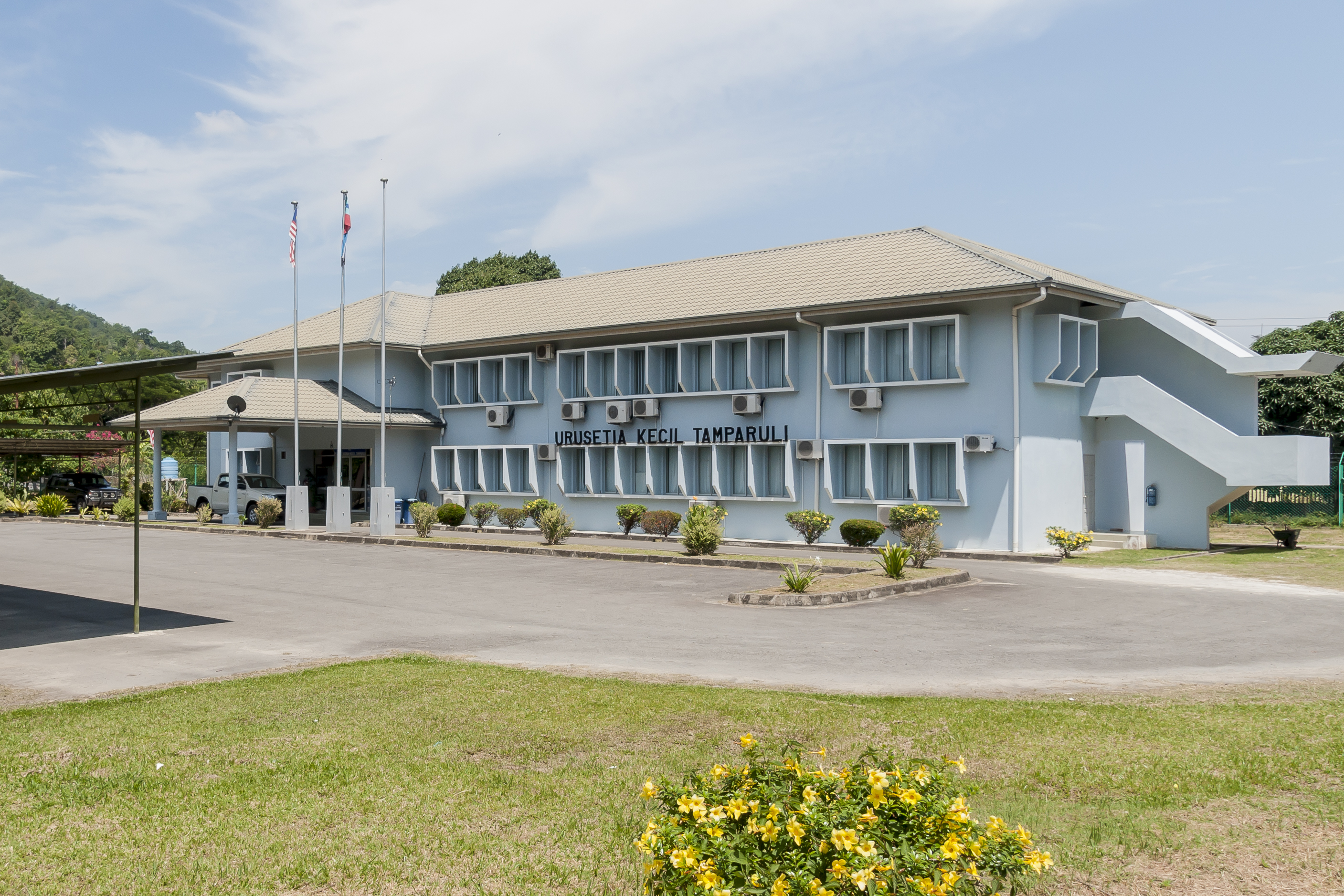
Tamparuli Sub-District Office

The Tamparuli Sub-District Office has undergone several transitions since its establishment. Initially, it began serving the Tamparuli community in 1977, with just 14 staff members operating out of a store in Tamparuli town. In 1982, the office moved to a dedicated building located near Tamparuli town, along Jalan Kampong Bawang. By 2004, the district administration center expanded into a new building, accommodating 38 staff members, and also housed the local court, Tamparuli. These developments reflect the growth and increasing needs of the Tamparuli community over time.

==== Assistant District Officer Tamparuli ====
The current Assistant Sub-District Officer of Tamparuli is Hannevy W Harry.

List of Names of Tamparuli Subdistrict Assistant Officers
Num	Date of service	Officer's name
1	1977 Until 1979	Azman Edmund bin Datuk Mohd. Yaakub Imbayan
2	1980 Until 1981	Felix Richard Kadayum
3	August 1981 until December 1982	Victor Jikomin Moosom
4	1983 until 1985	Jeffery Ghani
5	1986 until 1992	Jimmy Kojuna
6	1992 until 1994	Edwin Siagian
7	1994 until 1997	Victor Jikomin Moosom
8	1997 until June 1999	Datuk Robert Stidi
9	June 1999 until October 2000	Lian Awang
10	November 2000 until December 2002	Steven Galono
11	January 2003 until October 2010	Edip Abun
12	October 2010 until 1 April 2018	Celestinus Lawanding
13	1 April 2018 until 6 April 2019	Joseph Bangguan
14	6 April 2019 until 21 October 2024	Herman Tunggiging
15	21 October 2024 Current	Hannevy W Harry

=== Mukim ===
The Tuaran district has 4 administrative areas, namely;

- Tamparuli area
- Kiulu area
- Sulaman area
- Pantai Dalit area

Under the Tamparuli area, it is divided into 5 Mukims, namely:

- Mukim Tamparuli
- Mukim Tenghilan
- Mukim Topokon
- Mukim Gayaratau/Rungus
- Mukim Tuaran Bandar

Under Mukim Tamparuli, it consists of 13 villages, namely:

- Kampong Telibong
- Kampong Pitas
- Kampong Tengkurangoh
- Kampong Sawah
- Kampong Bundung
- Kampong Damat
- Kampong Bulieng
- Kampong Sungai Damit
- Kampong Bintangor
- Kampong Bantayan
- Kampong Tamparuli
- Kampong Mangkaladoi
- Tamparuli Town

== Architectural structure ==
=== Building ===
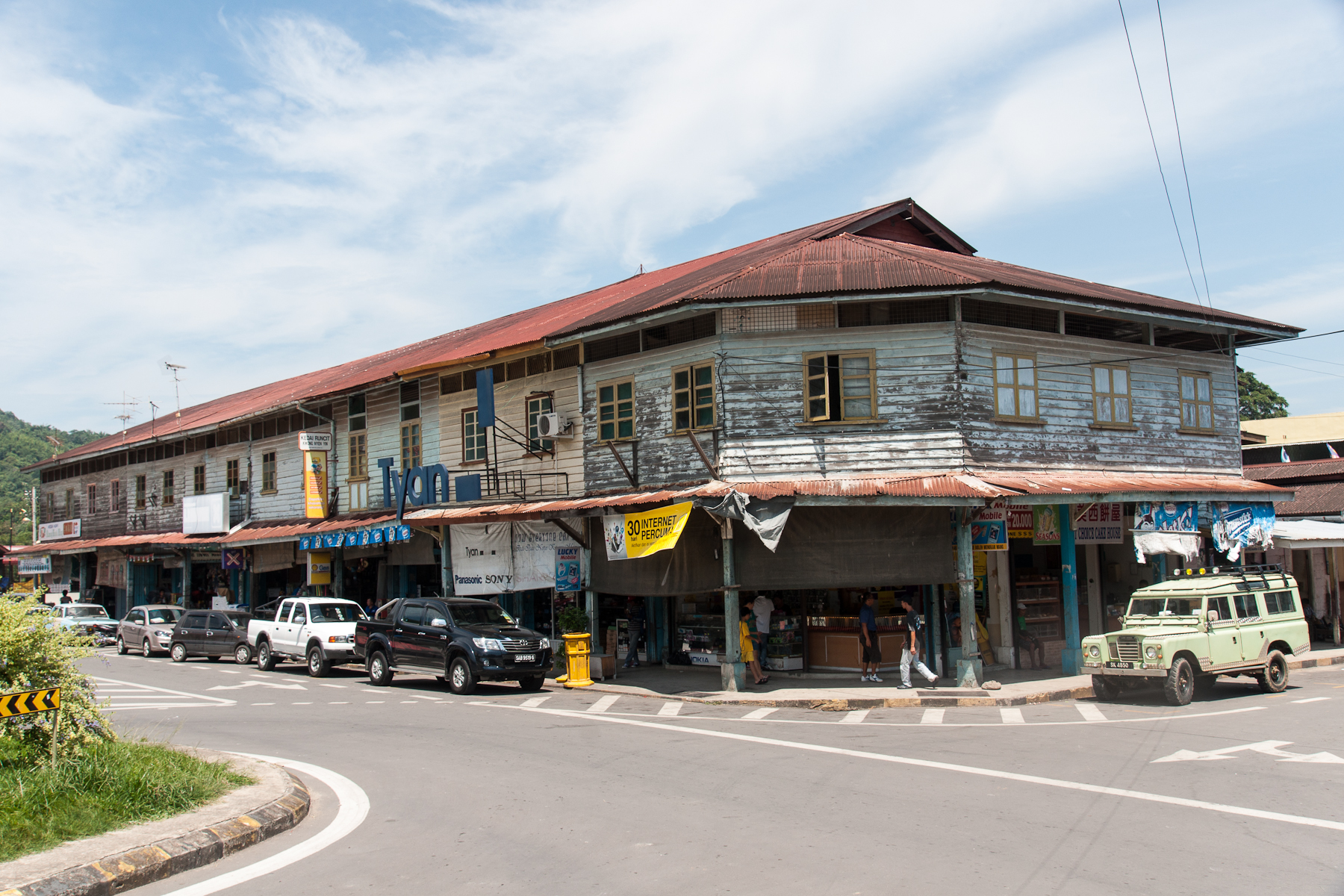
Old shop in Tamparuli town

Like many other towns in Sabah and Malaysia as a whole, the town of Tamparuli consists of a mix of newly built concrete retail shops and old wooden structures. Tamparuli town has four rows of wooden shop houses built around 1946, a year after the end of World War II. These historic wooden shop houses are similar in structure to those found in the Tuaran district, such as in the towns of Tenghilan and Tuaran. The old wooden shop houses in Tamparuli measure approximately 20' x 80' (6.06 m x 24.3 m), with each unit extended to the back, featuring a central courtyard. The physical characteristics of these wooden shop houses include a two-storey design, with the upper floor used for residential purposes for the shopkeepers, while the ground floor is dedicated to business activities, mostly operated by the Chinese community. These historic wooden shop houses also have a verandah, which serves as a space to display goods for sale and as a walkway for pedestrians. However, only two of the original wooden shop houses in Tamparuli remain due to destruction caused by fires in 2008 and 1976. The old shop buildings in Tamparuli hold significant historical value that should be preserved and developed to attract visitors to the town. Tamparuli is said to have potential for growth with the presence of new concrete building developments, such as Tamparuli Point and the Bataras Tamparuli supermarket.

=== Bridge ===
The bridge for vehicle traffic was built by British engineers in the 1930s using a combination of cement and iron.

== Population demographics ==
=== Ethnic ===
==== The population around Tamparuli ====
The population of Tamparuli in 2010, according to statistical sources, was 1,402, with the majority belonging to the Kadazan-Dusun ethnic group (mainly Dusun Lotud). The indigenous people originally living in the Tamparuli area are the Dusun Lotud. A census was conducted on 7 July 2020, to gather updated population statistics. The total population for the year 2020 was recorded at 40,502.

Below is the breakdown of the population in the Tamparuli area for the years 2010 and 2020, categorised by ethnic group, Local Authority Area, and state in Malaysia.

The population by ethnic group, Local Authority areas, and states in Malaysia
Year	Malay	Kadazan/Dusun	Bajau	Murut	Other Bumiputera	Chinese	Indian	Others	Non-citizen of Malaysia	Overall total
2010	72	650	51	21	66	388	11	55	88	1,402
2020	2,403	23,275	6,592	128	3,757	1,155	26	405	2,761	40,502

Ethnic Groups around Tamparuli - 2010 Census
Ethnic	Percentage
Malay	5.1%
Kadazan-Dusun	46.3%
Bajau	3.6%
Murut	1.5%
Other Bumiputera	4.7%
Chinese	27.7%
Indian	0.8%
Others	4.0%
Non-citizen of Malaysia	6.3%

==== The population of the Sub-district of Tamparuli ====
The population of the small town of Tamparuli, which includes surrounding villages, was 31,500 in 2014. A large majority of the population belongs to the Kadazan/Dusun ethnic group, with most being from the Lotud Dusun subgroup. The Lotud people are believed to have originated from the villages of Kampong Tambalugu, Puju, Lakang, Telibong, Tomui, Sungai Damit, Bantayan, and Kampong Nohirot, which are still their settlement areas to this day. This highlights Tamparuli as one of the key locations where the Kadazan/Dusun community resides.

Here is the population in the small area of Tamparuli in 2014 according to the percentage distribution;

Information on the population of the small district of Tamparuli by percentage
Year	Kadazan/Dusun	Chinese	Bajau	Others	Total overall
2014	77%	15%	8%	Unknown	31,500

=== Gender ===
Below is the population of Tamparuli in 2010 and 2020 according to gender distribution as follows;

Gender
Year	Male	Female	Total
2010	703	699	1,402
2020	20,634	19,868	40,502

=== Language ===
The people of Tamparuli, like most of Sabah, speak Malay with a mix of the Sabah dialect. The majority of the population in Tamparuli, around 77%, are of Kadazan/Dusun descent, and the Dusun language is predominantly spoken by the residents. Additionally, nearly 15% of the population in Tamparuli are of Chinese descent, and the Hakka and Mandarin languages are also spoken by the Chinese community in Tamparuli.

== Disaster ==
=== Flood ===
The floods have a historical record in the area town of Tamparuli that reminds people until today, the floods also have impacted other areas such as Tuaran, Tenghilan and, other districts in Sabah. In the year 1999, the area Tamparuli town was hit by a massive flood at that time and bring destroyed convenience such as the Tamparuli old bridge. Flooding also occurred in the year 1992 in area Tamparuli town.

Next, the floods also occurred in the year 1996 due to Ribut Tropika Greg (Tropical Depression Greg) that hit the entire state of Sabah. The Tuaran district affected, where the road links between Tuaran and Kota Kinabalu as a result of the falling tree, as well as the lack of electricity throughout the area due to broken cables or broken electrical poles. Thus, this has made the government and the private sector unable to function and, water supply is also a problem. In the area town of Tamparuli, SK Saradan, SK Pekan Tamparuli, SK Rungus, SK Lingga Baru, SK Guakon and, SMK Tamparuli were the schools that reported the case.

On 15 January 2014, the Tamparuli town area was hit by landslides and floods. The rain that non-stop causes several areas hit by flooding and, the landslide occurred in the village of Rangalau Baru. The severe flooding caused several vehicles to be stranded and unable to get out of the area. Now, the success of 20 students from SMK Tamparuli, created a flood warning system installed on the Tamparuli Old Bridge here, benefiting more than 12,000 locals. Thus, this system can help to enhance the safety and give information about the flood to the community.

=== Fire disaster ===
In 2008, a fire occurred at the historic old shop in Tamparuli, resulting in the destruction of the building. Currently, two rows of wooden shop houses remain and are still used for business purposes. In the following years, the site of the destruction was rebuilt with new concrete buildings to replace the old shop that was destroyed in the fire. The historic old shop that was built once stood as a landmark for the town.

== Geography ==
Position of Tamparuli Town near other areas;

At 6°8′N 116°16′E, Tamparuli is located in the western part of Sabah, Malaysia, on the island of Borneo. The town sits in the Tuaran District, which is part of the broader Kota Kinabalu Division. Geographically, Tamparuli is situated at an elevation of about 50 to 100 meters above sea level, and it is surrounded by the rolling hills of the West Coast Range, which is a mountain range that runs along the west coast of Sabah. The landscape surrounding Tamparuli is characterised by tropical rainforest and hilly terrain. The West Coast Range offers beautiful, undisturbed forests that are part of the Mount Kinabalu Conservation Area. This geography is part of the natural habitats that support the region's rich biodiversity, including numerous species of plants and animals.

=== Climate ===
Tamparuli has a tropical rainforest climate, influenced by its elevation and proximity to the mountains. Temperatures in the town tend to be cooler than lowland areas, typically ranging between 21°C and 32°C. Due to its location near in the mountains, Tamparuli experiences frequent rainfall, especially during the monsoon seasons, which contributes to its lush green surroundings. Night temperatures can be slightly cooler, especially during the rainy season, and may drop to around 21°C (70°F).

== Agricultural economics ==
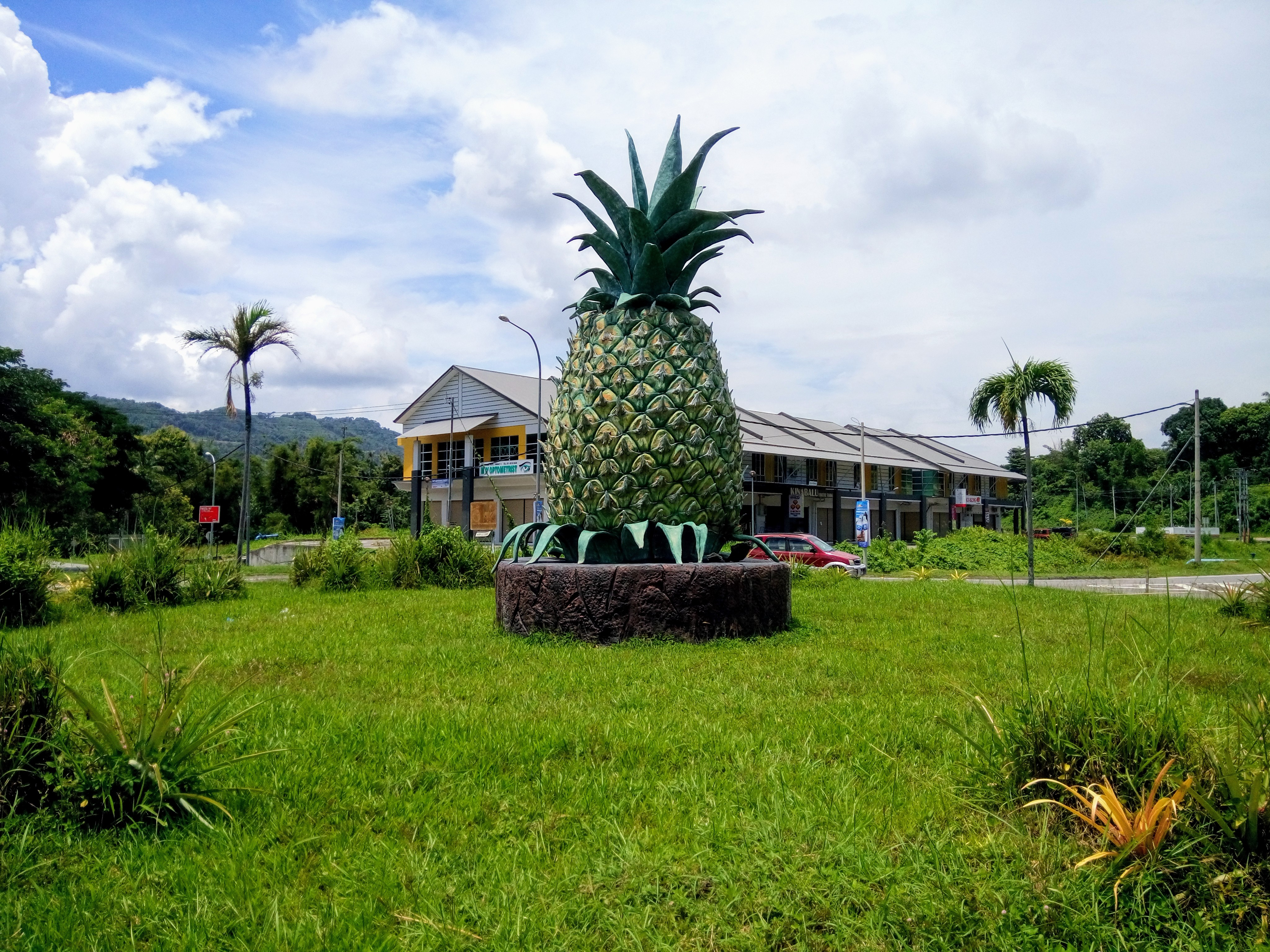
The Pineapple Replica at the Tamparuli Roundabout serves as a symbol of the region's main agricultural crop

Tamparuli and Kiulu has a variety of crops, including honey pineapple as the main agricultural product sold at the Tamparuli market. There are also other crops such as vegetables, mixed fruits, coconut, bananas, cassava, sweet potatoes, spices (ginger, turmeric, galangal, lemongrass), hill paddy, cocoa, and more. The rural communities in Tamparuli and Kiulu also engage in stingless bee farming, known as Tantadan among the Dusun community, for additional income and medicinal purposes.

== Tourist attractions ==
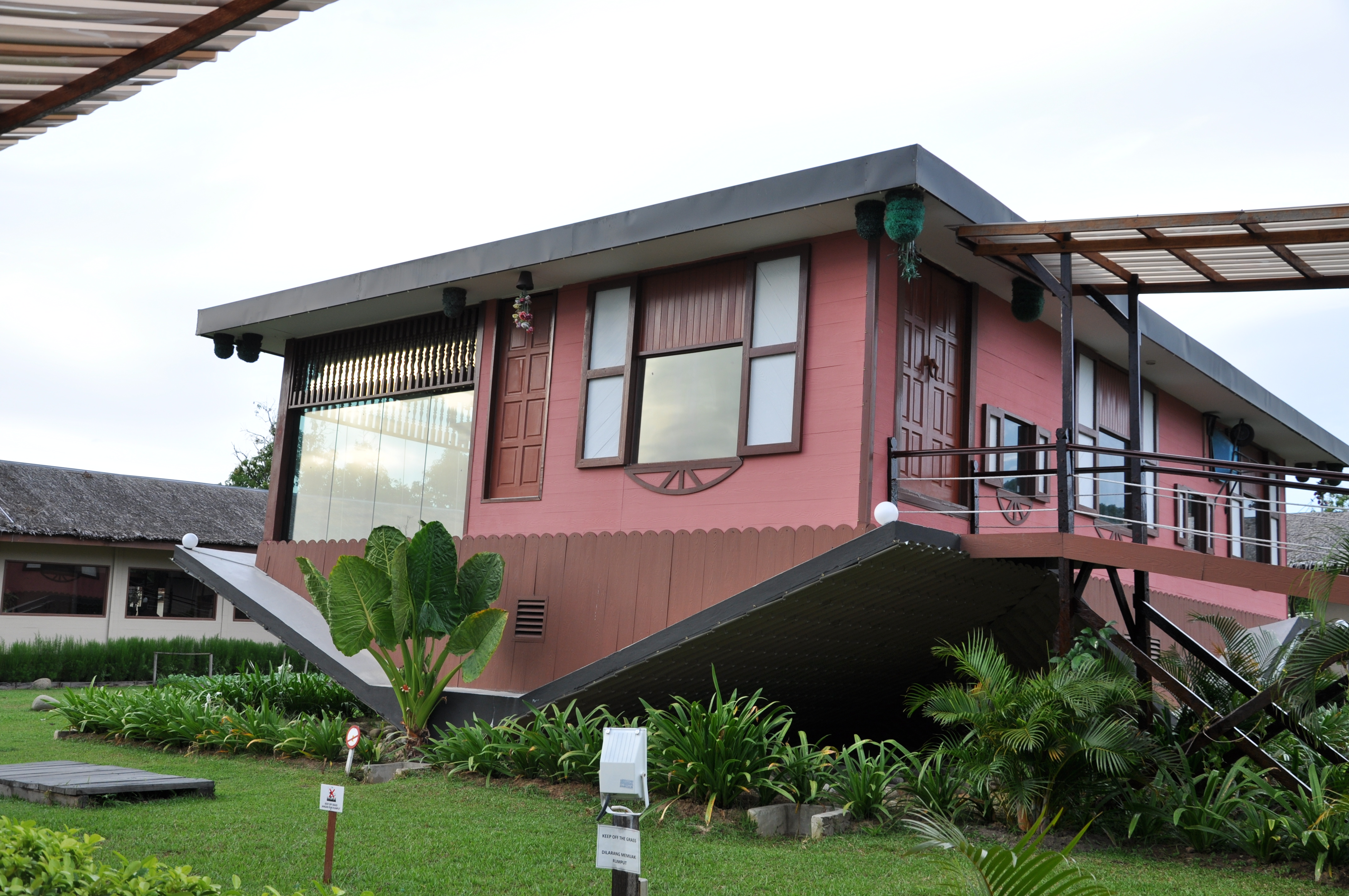
The Upside Down House

=== Rumah Terbalik (The Upside Down House) ===
Rumah Terbalik is the first, and only, upside-down house in Malaysia. Opened in February, 2012, the house has become a popular destination for tourists visiting Sabah. Guided tours are available throughout the day, allowing visitors to learn more about the house's design and construction.

=== Tamparuli Suspension Bridge ===
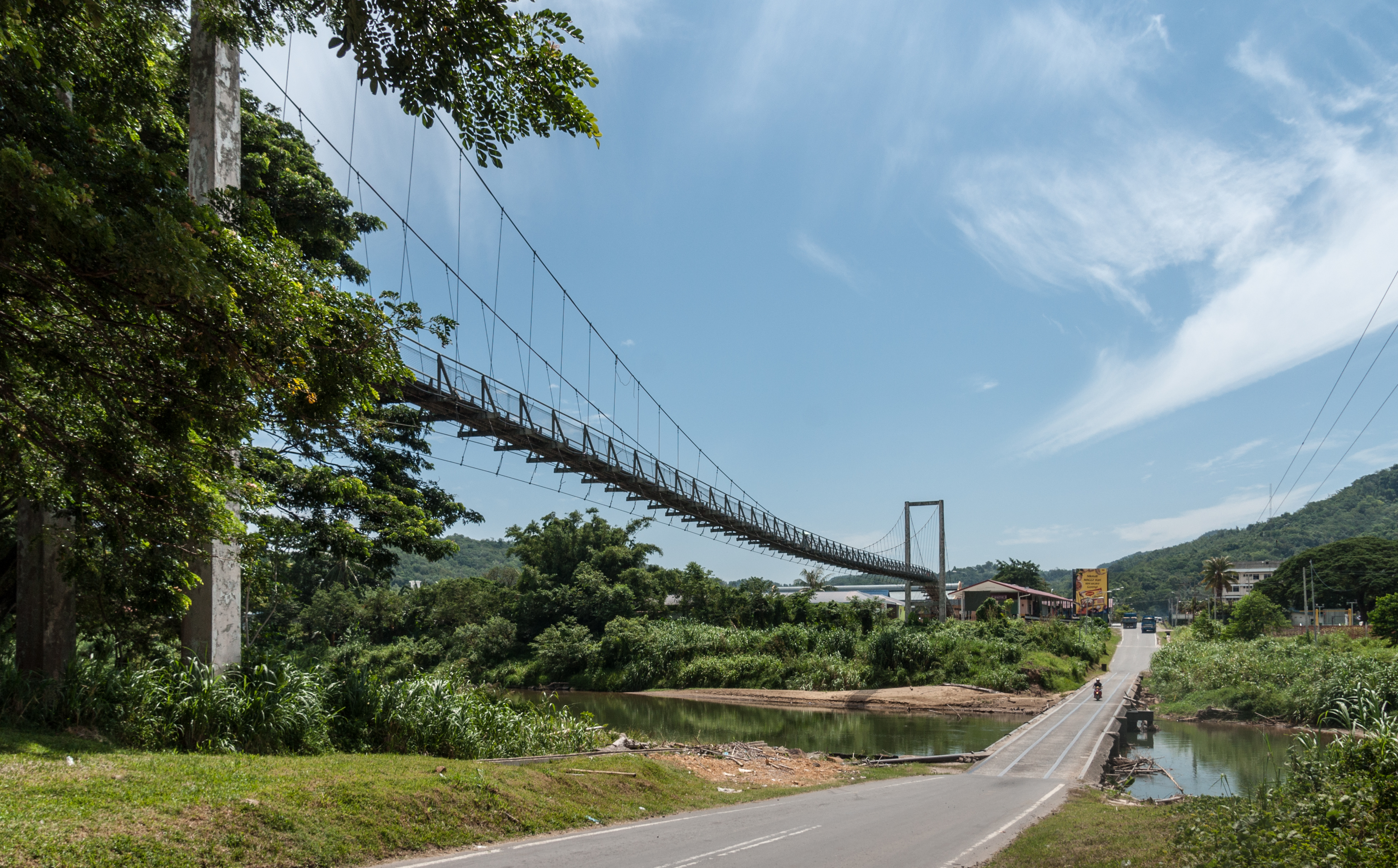
Tamparuli Sabah Suspension Bridge

The new Tamparuli Suspension Bridge was built in early 1999 after a massive flood destroyed the original bridge. The new suspension bridge spans over 100 meters in length and is recorded as the longest suspension bridge in Sabah. Adjacent to this bridge is the old Tamparuli Bridge, which was built by the British military around the 1960s to accommodate vehicular traffic travelling from Kota Kinabalu to Tamparuli. The old bridge crosses a river and has been prone to flooding during heavy rainfall. The suspension bridge, known as the Tamparuli Bridge, has become a popular spot for visitors to stop and take photos in the town of Tamparuli. The bridge gained fame after the song named after it was sung by local artists Justin Lusah and the late John Gaisah. In addition, visitors to the Tamparuli Bridge are warmly greeted by traditional Dusun music and dance performances at the foot of the bridge starting from 1 September 2019. The performances, held daily and free of charge, are presented by the Tuaran Arts Association (Festival), aiming to entertain and create a unique atmosphere for visitors, offering them a memorable experience. The FESTIVAL music group consists of five to thirteen performers, featuring instruments such as Marimba (Babadon), Rek Bambu (Bangau), Kulintangan, Tagunggak, Sompoton, Suling, Skopion, and Sompoton Kembar. The Tamparuli Suspension Bridge has become a major landmark for Tamparuli, widely recognised by people around the world.

=== Ruhiang Hill (Bukit Perahu) ===
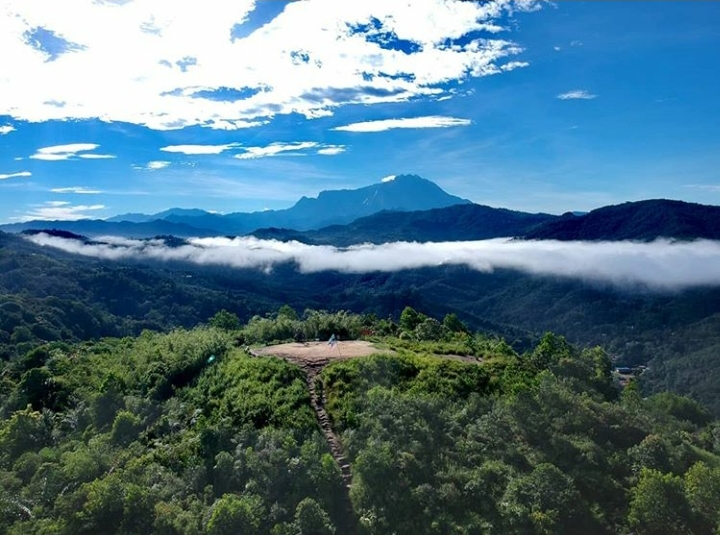
Bukit Perahu and scenic landscape of Mount Kinabalu can be seen from top of the hill

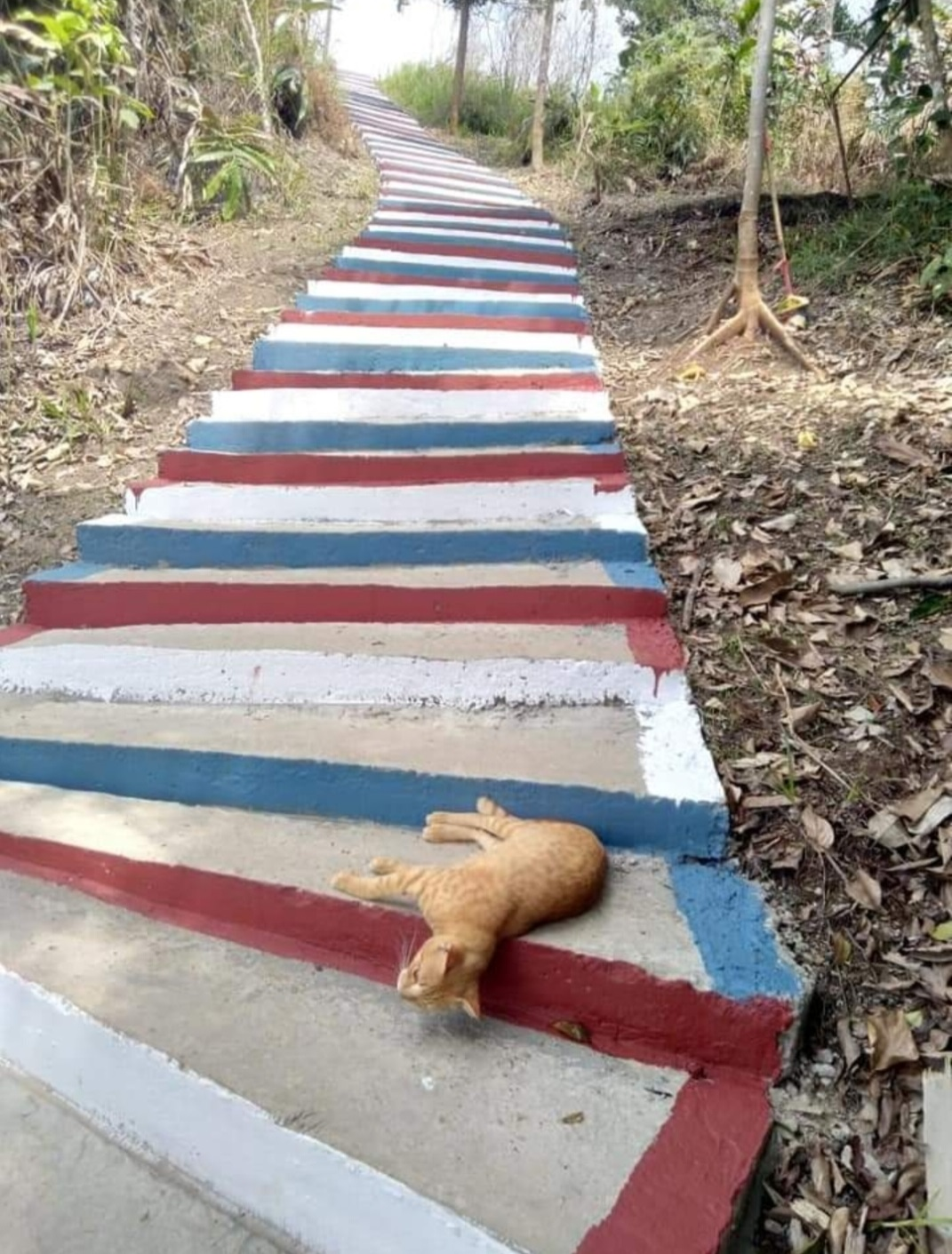
Bukit Perahu staircase route in 2022

Bukit Ruhiang, more commonly known as Bukit Perahu (St. Veronica hill), is a popular hiking spot located near the town of Tamparuli, and the rock behind the hill gives the place its name because it resembles a boat. Bukit Perahu, also known by Roman Catholic followers as St. Veronica Hill, is a hill with a large white cross planted at its summit. Bukit Perahu is situated behind a nearby Buddhist temple along the road leading to Kampung Bawang and Kampung Togop in Tamparuli. This road was once known as the old Ranau road, which connected to the Tamparuli-Ranau Highway. The hill has become a favourite destination for hikers and tourists, offering a great spot for outdoor enthusiasts to engage in fitness training and extreme sports activities. Bukit Perahu, located in Tamparuli, is also identified as one of the best locations for air sports such as paragliding. Yang Berhormat Datuk Jahid Jahim, the Member of the State Legislative Assembly (ADUN) for Tamparuli, participated in paragliding here, with support from members of Borneo Air Sport Ozone Adventures.

Additionally, there is another hiking spot called Bukit Kusai, which is also a popular attraction for visitors interested in hiking and mountain biking. From the summits of both Bukit Perahu and Bukit Kusai, visitors can enjoy a beautiful view of Mount Kinabalu on clear days. It was a majestic and beautiful view from the hilltop, where the entire Tamparuli Town area also could be seen from there. Every year, the Bukit Perahu also known as Bukit St. Veronica trail is used for the Roman Catholic adherent of the Good Friday cross procession. On 31 December 2021, a project was carried out to upgrade the concrete steps along the walking path to Bukit Perahu, improving comfort for hikers and visitors.

=== Murug-Turug Eco Tourism (MTET) ===
Murug-Turug eco-tourism, hiking & jungle trekking (MTET) is one of the tourist attractions for outdoor activities located in the Kampong Minangkob, 11 kilometres from Tamparuli Town and, 45 kilometres from Kota Kinabalu city. Murug Turug, often referred to as the "Heaven of Waterfalls" and was recognised for its efforts by receiving the Sabah Tourism Award in 2019 for Best Community-Based Tourism Initiative (Rural).

=== JonGrapevines & Figs Garden ===
JonGrapevines & Figs Garde is also a tourist attraction and located in Kampong Bantayan, Tamparuli. This place shows various types of grapes and figs. Jontih, who is also the owner of Nursery JonGrapevines & Figs Garden in Kampung Bantayan, Tamparuli, Tuaran. Jontih also has 75 types of grapes, the seeds of which were obtained from the United States, Spain, the United Kingdom, Russia, China, and Japan.

== Facilities ==
=== Jogging track ===
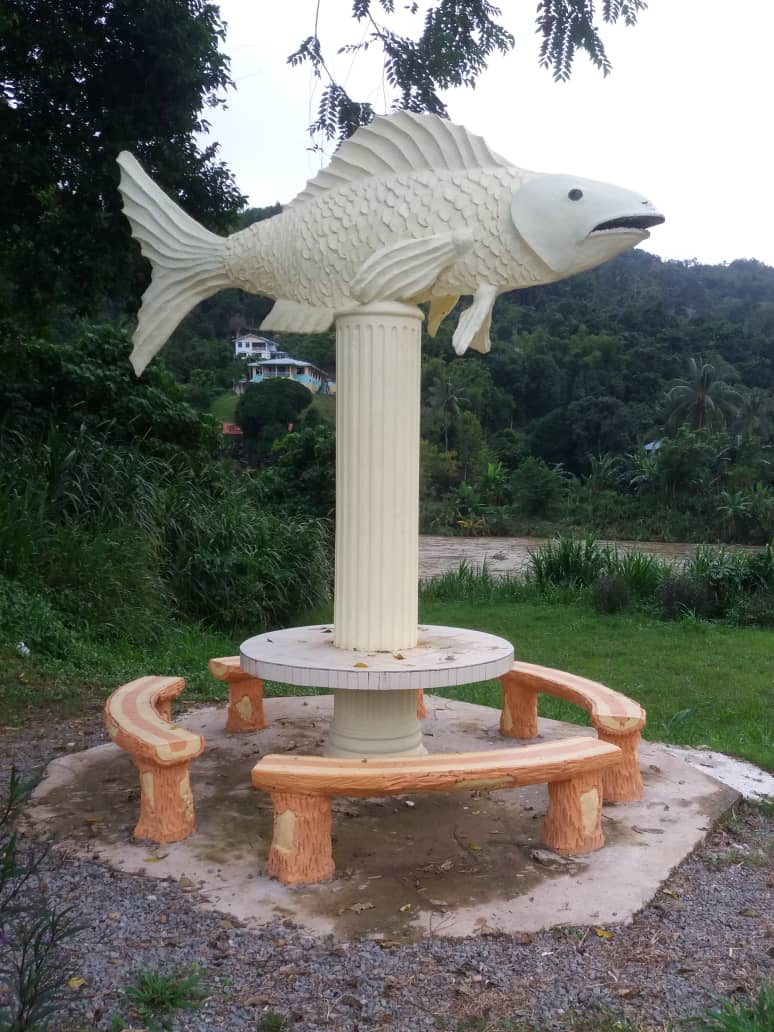
Freshwater Fish Statue

Pekan Tamparuli has facilities such as a jogging track built along the edge of the Tamparuli River for the community to engage in recreational activities, with a distance of approximately 1 kilometre. In addition, a replica of a freshwater fish statue near the jogging track also contributes to the area's appeal, attracting both locals and visitors to the Tamparuli district for recreational activities and serving as a symbol of the Tagal area since 2011. The replica fish statue, made of concrete, stands about three meters tall and is placed atop a five-meter concrete pillar, surrounded by benches for visitors to rest. Furthermore, the jogging track is located near a small canteen and a shelter. According to YB Datuk Jahid Jahim, he hopes to install lights along the jogging track and build stretching stations in the future to enhance safety and provide comfort to the community.

=== MyCyber Community Centre@Sabah ===
The MyCyber Komuniti@Sabah Centre, located in the Tamparuli area, is the first centre developed in the state of Sabah, and the Tokou Sabah Cooperative Bhd has been entrusted with the responsibility of developing this centre to make it more progressive. This MyCyber Komuniti@Sabah Centre is situated within the Tamparuli Point building. Tamparuli was chosen as the ICT centre to share information about the importance of using computers and the internet positively. This facility is also crucial for improving the quality of life for the people in Tamparuli, enabling them to access ICT services in line with the current digital developments. With such facilities, the community can become more aware and knowledgeable in handling cyber attacks, viruses, hackers, and more. CyberSecurity Malaysia and Tokou Sabah Cooperative Bhd have exchanged a memorandum of agreement (MoA).

=== Other facilities ===
1. Clinic
2. Police Station
3. Tun Hamdan Community Hall
4. Tamparuli Youth Hall
5. Post Office
6. Sabah State Library Tamparuli Branch
7. Place of worship
8. School
9. Tamparuli Sub-district Office

== In popular culture ==
=== The Tamparuli Bridge Song ===
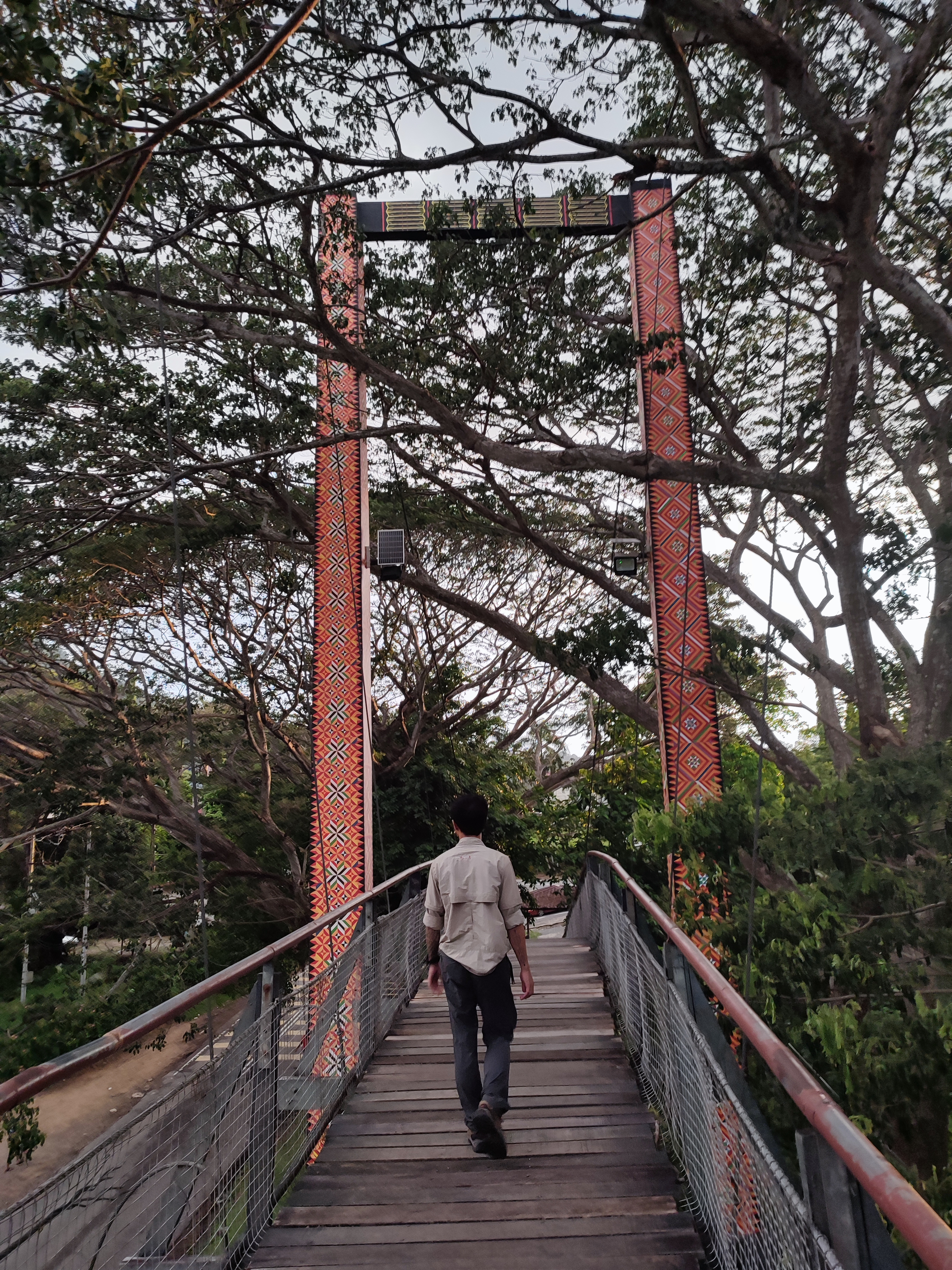
On the Tamparuli Bridge

The Tamparuli Bridge Song is a folk song written and created by Justin Lusah in 1977, a renowned local singer in Sabah. The song became a favourite of the Kadazan-Dusun people and has a special place in the cultural heritage of the region. It tells the story of the Tamparuli Suspension Bridge, which is an iconic landmark in the city of Tamparuli, and captures the charm and beauty of the area. The Tamparuli Bridge Song is popular for its catchy melody and nostalgic lyrics. It's frequently performed during cultural events, gatherings, and festivals, where it brings out a sense of pride for the community and their traditions.

Pak pak kang ku doh (Pak! Pak! I tread),
Sumunsui doh jambatan (following/crossing the bridge),
Jambatan doh Tamparuli (The Tamparuli Bridge),
Bakasut tinggi oku (on my high heels...)

In the context of the lyrics, "Pak pak" (or "Pok pok") refers to the sound made by the high-heeled shoes or shoes with thick soles as they hit the ground. The rhythmic sound of shoes represent the motion of walking on the bridge. This sound is an essential part of the song's charm, as it connects to the lively and upbeat rhythm, as well as the experience of crossing the iconic Tamparuli bridge.

==== International level ====
The song "Jambatan Tamparuli" played during the opening of the 2024 Gyeryong Military Culture Festival in Korea. Created in Sabah, Malaysia, it showcased the country’s unique culture to an international audience. The Gyeryong Military Culture Festival is an event that combines military and cultural elements, providing a platform to introduce various aspects of culture from different countries.

The selection song of "Jambatan Tamparuli" one of the featured performances at the festival highlights how Malaysian traditional music can transcend borders and resonate with global audiences.

=== Tamu ===
Tamu Tamparuli has long existed in the year 1974 ago and every Wednesday morning, tamu (native open-air market) is held in Tamparuli town. At the tamu, local produce, seafood, traditional food and drinks, handicrafts, and various other items from Tamparuli and surrounding villages are bought and sold. The Tamparuli Market is also a great place for locals to socialise and gather as they conduct their business. A larger tamu is also held in the town of Tamparuli, which will take place on 2 and 3 March 2020, organised by the Farmers and Livestock Farmers Association (PETANAH).

=== Tagal system ===
The Tagal system, also known as Bombon, is a traditional practice by the people of Sabah to conserve river fish resources. This system has been practised for a long time by the Kadazandusun community in Tamparuli, or generally in Sabah. One of the areas designated as a Tagal area is the Tamparuli River, near the Tamparuli bridge. The implementation of the Tagal system in Tamparuli has been ongoing since 1963. This system helps protect the river by preventing illegal and unregulated fishing. The initiative was established by 11 villages in the Tamparuli district, including Bawang, Gontung, Kiwoi, Bontoi, Rungus, Madang, Bundu Tohuri, Rani, Kayangat, Tomboilik, and Gayaratau.

As such, the Tagal system cannot be trespassed by villagers or outsiders, except during specific times set aside for fishing. Anyone found violating the Tagal area will face strict action, including the confiscation of fishing equipment and a fine of up to RM50,000. Additionally, violators of the Tagal regulations may also be subject to a Sogit (fine) imposed by the Village Head or District Head based on the Sabah Inland Fisheries & Aquaculture Enactment 2003. The Tagal system at the Tamparuli River has also been developed as an eco-tourism area, further promoted to attract more visitors to the Tamparuli town.

== Entertainment ==
=== Performance ===
- The musical theatre about the story of the Solungkoi Jambatan Tamparuli in 2018, performed at the Auditorium of the Department of Culture and Arts Malaysia (JKKN) Sabah.
- The Bamboo Music Festival, held annually, is enlivened with musical performances using bamboo musical instruments.
- The musical theatre performance Munduk Ruhiang: Tangisan Batu Perahu (The Legend of Gunsoloi and Bukit Perahu) was staged at the Recital Hall Universiti Malaysia Sabah.

== Notable people ==
- Marsha Milan - Akademi Fantasia Season-3
- Yang Berhormat Datuk Jahid Jahim - DUN N.14 Tamparuli
