= Sabah Chinese Consolidated Party =

Sabah Chinese Consolidated Party Parti Cina Bersatu Sabah PCBS
- Abbreviation: PCBS
- Founded: 1980
- Headquarters: Kota Kinabalu
- National affiliation: Sabah Front (1981–1986)
- Colours: White, red

The Sabah Chinese Consolidated Party (Malay: Parti Cina Bersatu Sabah (PCBS)), short for SCCP, was a Sabahan-based minor political party formed in 1980. The party claimed to represent the Chinese community in Sabah.

In the 1981 state elections, the SCCP joined forces with United Sabah National Organisation (USNO) and United Pasok Nunukragang National Organisation (PASOK) in an electoral pact, to oppose the ruling Sabah People's United Front (BERJAYA), and won one seat for N48 Bandar Tawau. However, following the resignation of the SCCP sole assemblyman Chan Tze Hiang from the party in late 1982 to become an independent, the seat was subsequently recaptured by BERJAYA in the next election. The SCCP decided not to contest the 1985 state election, and instead supported Joseph Pairin Kitingan's Parti Bersatu Sabah (PBS).

The SCCP contested its final election in the 1986 state election, winning one seat, but the winner left the party 2 days later to join PBS. The party was dissolved a few years later, when most of the party members formed a new party, Liberal Democratic Party.

== Election results ==
Election year	Malaysia Parliament		Outcome
Election year	Candidates	Seats won	Outcome
1982	2	0 / 154	; No representation in Parliament

=== State election results ===
Sabah State Legislative Assembly
Election	Votes		Seats			Position (Note: As part of electoral coalition.)	Status
Election	Count	%	Result	Won / contested	+/–	Position	Status
1981			1 / 48	1 / 7	▲16	2nd (Barisan Sabah)	Opposition
1985	Did not contest						No seats
1986			1 / 48	1 / 6	Steady	▼4th	PBS (Note: Its sole assemblyman joined PBS.)

== See also ==
- Politics of Malaysia
- List of political parties in Malaysia
