= Sabah People's Party =

Sabah People's Party Parti Rakyat Sabah PRS
- Abbreviation: PRS
- President: James Peter Ongkili
- Founder: James Peter Ongkili
- Founded: February 1989
- Dissolved: 1991
- Split from: BERJAYA
- Headquarters: Kota Kinabalu
- Dewan Negara: 0 / 70
- Dewan Rakyat: 0 / 222
- Sabah State Legislative Assembly: 0 / 60

The Sabah People's Party or Malay: Parti Rakyat Sabah (PRS) is a minor party which was formed in 1989 by Sabah People's United Front (BERJAYA) leader James Peter Ongkili in an effort to woo Sabah voters from both BERJAYA and United Sabah Party (PBS) in the general elections.

== State election results ==
Sabah State Legislative Assembly
| Election | Votes | | Seats | | | Position | Status |
| Election | Count | % | Result | Won / contested | +/– | Position | Status |
|---|---|---|---|---|---|---|---|
| 1990 | 12,133 | 3.3 | 0 / 48 | 0 / 42 | Steady | 4th | No seats |

== See also ==
- Politics of Malaysia
- List of political parties in Malaysia
