= 1990 Sabah state election =

State election in Sabah, Malaysia

← 1986	16–17 July 1990	1994 →

All 48 seats in the Sabah State Legislative Assembly 25 seats needed for a majority
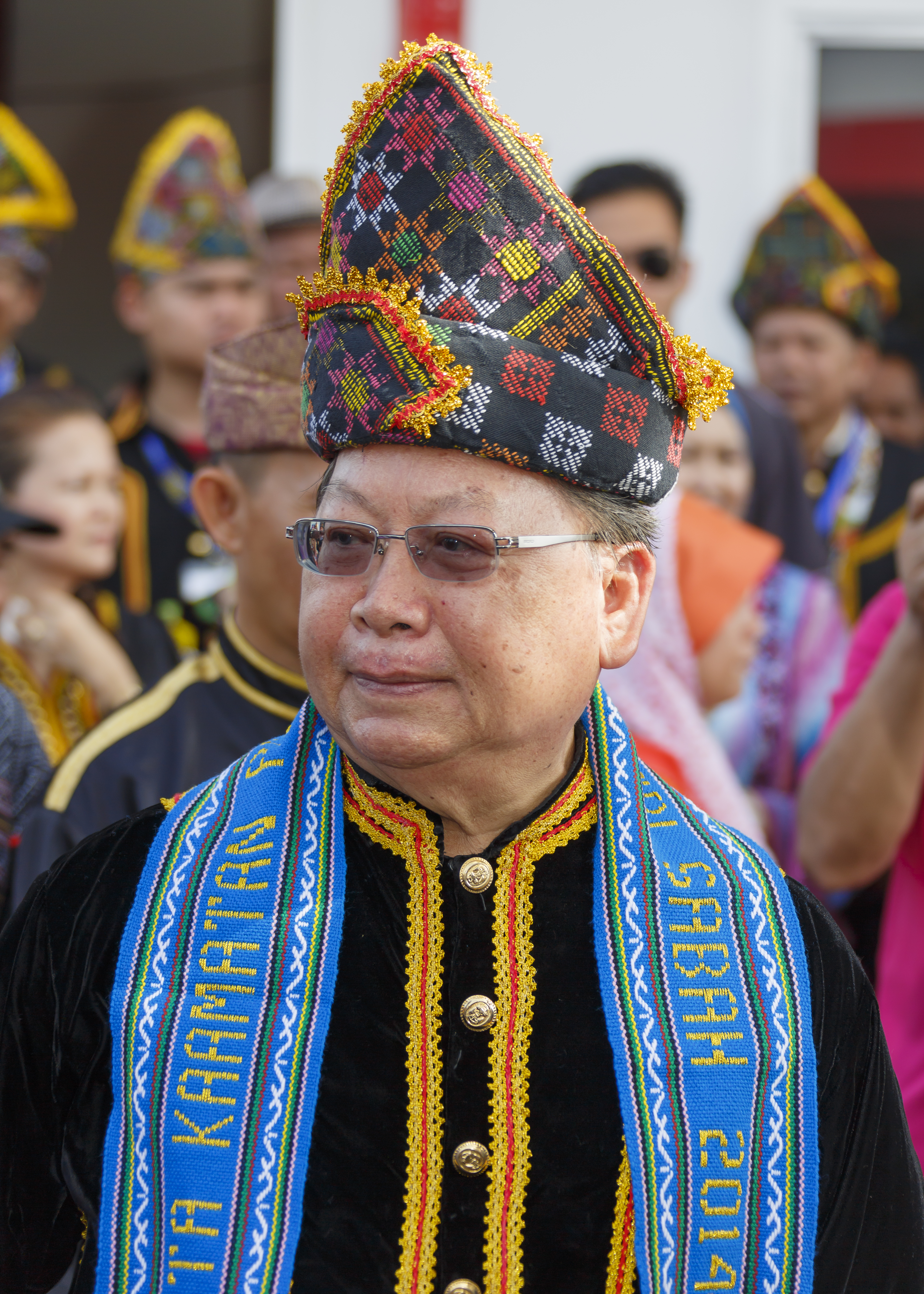

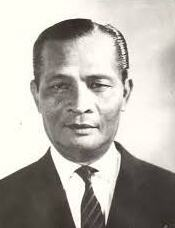

	Majority party	Minority party	Third party
Leader	Joseph Pairin Kitingan	Mustapha Harun	Harris Salleh
Party	PBS	USNO	BERJAYA
Alliance	Barisan Nasional (federal)	Barisan Nasional (federal)
Leader since	1985	1981
Leader's seat	Tambunan	Usukan	Sipitang (lost)
Last election	34 seats	12 seats	1 seat
Seats won	36	12	0
Seat change	▲2	Steady	▼1
Chief Minister before election
Joseph Pairin Kitingan
Barisan Nasional, (PBS)
Elected Chief Minister
Joseph Pairin Kitingan
Barisan Nasional, (PBS)

The 1990 Sabah state election was held between Monday, 16 July and Tuesday, 17 July 1990. Parti Bersatu Sabah (PBS) was the incumbent ruling party in the state and part of the Barisan Nasional coalition, which PBS joined after the 1986 state election.

In the election, PBS won with the same seat as the previous election, 34. United Sabah National Organization (USNO) winning the remaining 14 seats to become the main opposition, while other parties, including former state government party BERJAYA, did not win any seat.

== Contesting parties ==
USNO was also a member of the BN but rival of PBS. Therefore, PBS and USNO candidates were made to contest under their own party tickets.

Among other parties contesting for the first time including AKAR formed by former PBS vice-president Mark Koding, PBS member Kalakau Untol, and USNO ex-member Pandikar Amin Mulia; Parti Rakyat Sabah formed by ex-BERJAYA member James Ongkili, and Liberal Democratic Party (LDP). Peninsula-based Democratic Action Party is also contesting in Sabah.

== Results ==
Party	Votes	%	Seats	+/–
United Sabah Party	197,708	53.92	36	+2
United Sabah National Organisation	95,857	26.14	12	0
Sabah People's United Front	25,993	7.09	0	New
Liberal Democratic Party	14,323	3.91	0	New
Sabah People's Party	12,133	3.31	0	New
People's Justice Front	10,757	2.93	0	New
Democratic Action Party	5,879	1.60	0	0
Independents	4,006	1.09	0	0
Total	366,656	100.00	48	0
Valid votes	366,656	98.25		
Invalid/blank votes	6,528	1.75		
Total votes	373,184	100.00		
Registered voters/turnout	496,353	75.19		
Source: HLSC Tindak Malaysia Github

== Aftermath ==
PBS' Joseph Pairin Kitingan were sworn in as Chief Minister for the third time, on 18 July 1990. The state EXCO members were sworn in the following day.

In October that year, just before the 1990 Malaysian general election, Pairin announced PBS exit from BN and joining Gagasan Rakyat coalition with Democratic Action Party (DAP).

BERJAYA continued its decline from its heyday as a government in 1976–1985 with defeats in all constituencies, including in Sipitang where its leader Harris Salleh lost to PBS and garnering only 969 votes. It even fails to retain its only seat in Buang Sayang, also won by PBS candidate. This was the final election that BERJAYA contests.

The following year on 21 February, USNO were changed into a new entity, the Sabah chapter of Peninsula-based United Malays National Organization (UMNO) under BN. BERJAYA would merge into UMNO Sabah 2 months later, when it was announced by Harris on 11 April that he and all members of BERJAYA are joining UMNO Sabah.

In 1992, 5 USNO assemblyman join PBS coalition. The other 7 USNO member remained within USNO until it was deregistered. When USNO was deregistered, 6 assemblyman joined UMNO Sabah and 6 others joined PBS.
