= Sabah Chinese Party =

Sabah Chinese Party Parti Cina Sabah PCS
- Abbreviation: PCS
- President: Francis Leong
- Founded: 1986
- Dissolved: Defunct
- Headquarters: Kota Kinabalu
- Colours: White, red
- Dewan Negara: 0 / 70
- Dewan Rakyat: 0 / 222
- Sabah State Legislative Assembly: 0 / 60

The Sabah Chinese Party or Malay: Parti Cina Sabah (PCS) is a minor party which was formed in 1980 to represent the Chinese community in Sabah.

== State election results ==
Sabah State Legislative Assembly
Election	Votes		Seats			Position	Status
Election	Count	%	Result	Won / contested	+/–	Position	Status
1986	4,006	1.3	0 / 48	0 / 7	Steady	5th	No seats

== See also ==
- Politics of Malaysia
- List of political parties in Malaysia
