= 1981 Sabah state election =

State election in Sabah, Malaysia

- 23–28 March 1981

All 48 seats in the Sabah State Legislative Assembly 25 seats needed for a majority

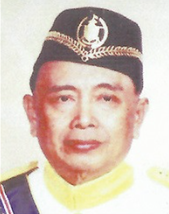

	Majority party	Minority party	Third party
Leader	Harris Salleh	Said Keruak	Steven Chan Tze Hiang
Party	BERJAYA	USNO	SCCP
Alliance	Barisan Nasional (federal)	Barisan Nasional (federal); Barisan Sabah (state)	Barisan Sabah (state)
Leader since	1976	1978
Leader's seat	Tenom	Usukan	Bandar Tawau
Last election	28 seats	20 seats	–
Seats won	44	3	1
Seat change	▲16	▼17	New
Popular vote	143557	47069	14511
Percentage	61.36%	20.12%	6.20%
Chief Minister before election
Harris Salleh
Barisan Nasional, (BERJAYA)
Elected Chief Minister
Harris Salleh
Barisan Nasional, (BERJAYA)

The 1981 Sabah state election was held between Monday, 23 March and Saturday, 28 March 1981. This was the fourth state election to take place. The Sabah State Legislative Assembly was dissolved on 21 February 1981, 2 months earlier than the expiry of the Assembly term on 26 April 1981. Candidates nomination took place on 7 March 1981.

In the election, BERJAYA Party led by Harris Salleh, an ally of federal government party Barisan Nasional (BN), won the election with a supermajority of 44 seats out of 48, and thus continued its governance of the state won since the last election on 1976. USNO, another component party of BN but opposition to BERJAYA on state level, created a coalition, Barisan Sabah, with PASOK and SCCP to fight BERJAYA. However the result were disastrous to the new coalition as they only won 4 seats; USNO reduced from 20 to 3 seats, SCCP winning one seat and PASOK none.

== Results ==
Party	Votes	%	Seats	+/–
Sabah People's United Front	143,557	61.36	44	+16
United Sabah National Organisation	47,069	20.12	3	–17
Sabah Chinese Consolidated Party	14,511	6.20	1	New
United Pasok Nunukragang National Organisation	17,250	7.37	0	New
Parti Perhimpunan Sosial Bersatu	1,984	0.85	0	New
Democratic Action Party	1,673	0.72	0	New
United Sabah People's Organisation	20	0.01	0	New
SEDAR	56	0.02	0	New
Independents	7,853	3.36	0	0
Total	233,973	100.00	48	0
Valid votes	233,973	98.20		
Invalid/blank votes	4,295	1.80		
Total votes	238,268	100.00		
Registered voters/turnout	314,974	75.65		
Source: HLSC Tindak Malaysia Github

== Aftermath ==
Harris were sworn in as Chief Minister for his second term, along with sworn in of his cabinet minister, on 30 March.

After USNO and Barisan Sabah's comprehensive defeat in the election, Said Keruak stepped down as USNO leader, replaced by Mustapha Harun, the former USNO leader and former Chief Minister. USNO would later expelled from BN in 1984, due to Mustapha's action against BN, one of which opposing the move to make Labuan a Federal Territory.

Internal clashes within BERJAYA led to Joseph Pairin Kitingan, the party's vice-president, exiting BERJAYA with several of the party assemblymen and formed Parti Bersatu Sabah (PBS). Pairin also won a December 1984 by-election, as an independent, in the Tambunan seat he had to vacate due to his resignation from BERJAYA and Sabah Assembly. These events led to Harris calling a snap election in March 1985, with the election held on 20–21 April 1985. PBS succeeded in toppling the BERJAYA government, winning 25 seats and setting in motion the 1985-1986 constitutional crisis in Sabah.
