= 1982 Malaysian general election =

- 22–26 April 1982

All 154 seats in the Dewan Rakyat 78 seats needed for a majority
- Registered: 6,081,628 (Note: Multiple constituencies were uncontested, reducing the number of eligible voters to 5,775,605.)
- Turnout: 74.39%
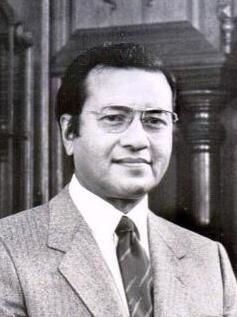

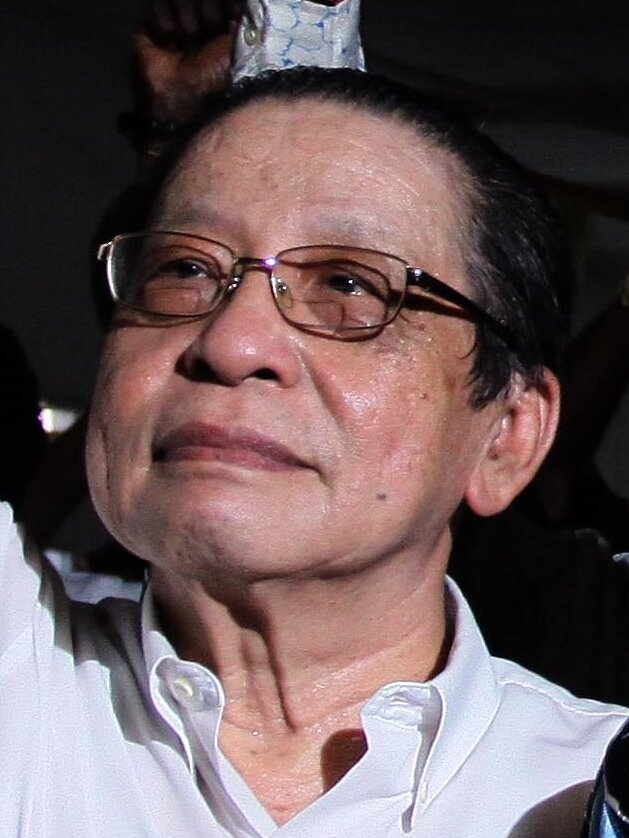

	First party	Second party	Third party
Leader	Mahathir Mohamad	Lim Kit Siang	Asri Muda
Party	UMNO	DAP	PAS
Alliance	Barisan Nasional
Last election	57.23%, 130 seats	19.13%, 16 seats	15.48%, 5 seats
Seats won	132	9	5
Seat change	▲2	▼7	Steady
Popular vote	2,522,079	815,473	602,530
Percentage	60.54%	19.58	14.46%
Swing	▲3.31pp	▲0.45pp	▼0.98pp
Prime Minister before election
Mahathir Mohamad
BN
Prime Minister-designate
Mahathir Mohamad
BN

General elections were held in Malaysia between Thursday, 22 April and Monday, 26 April 1982. Voting took place in all 154 parliamentary constituencies of Malaysia, each electing one Member of Parliament to the Dewan Rakyat, the dominant house of Parliament. State elections also took place in 293 state constituencies (except Sabah and Sarawak) on the same day. It was the first election for Mahathir Mohamad as Prime Minister since his appointment to this position in 1981.

The result was a victory for Barisan Nasional, which won 132 of the 154 seats. The coalition made significant gains in urban constituencies, reducing the Democratic Action Party's representation from 16 seats to nine. Voter turnout was 74%.

Polling was conducted in stages. Most parliamentary constituencies voted on 22 April, while polling in Sabah was held on 26 April, when the remaining parliamentary results were determined.

== Background ==
The general election was called less than a year after Mahathir succeeded as Prime Minister in July 1981. It was the first general election contested under Mahathir's leadership and was widely regarded as the new administration's first electoral test.

On 21 March 1982, Mahathir announced that Parliament would be dissolved on 29 March and expressed hope that the general election would be held in April. He also advised all state governments, except Sabah and Sarawak, to dissolve their legislative assemblies. Sabah and Sarawak did not participate in the concurrent state elections, as they had held state elections in 1981 and 1979 respectively.

== Campaign ==
Following the dissolution of Parliament, Barisan Nasional finalised its list of candidates after separate meetings between Mahathir Mohamad and leaders of the coalition's component parties. On 5 April, Mahathir announced that the line-up had been completed. The coalition fielded 74 UMNO, 28 MCA, seven Gerakan, four MIC, 11 Berjaya, five USNO, seven SUPP, nine SNAP, eight PBB and one BERJASA candidates for parliamentary seats.

The BN campaign was led by Mahathir and Deputy Prime Minister Musa Hitam under the slogan "Efficient, Clean and Trustworthy" (Bersih, Cekap dan Amanah). As part of Mahathir's effort to project a reformist image, UMNO fielded a large number of new candidates, replacing nearly half of its previous parliamentary candidates, including several Menteri Besar candidates.

A notable development before the election was the entry of Anwar Ibrahim, the former president of the Malaysian Islamic Youth Movement (ABIM), into UMNO. He contested the newly created parliamentary constituency of Permatang Pauh as a Barisan Nasional candidate.

PAS campaigned on an Islamic platform, using the slogan "The Quran is our constitution, the Prophet our guide, Islam our goal". During the campaign, the party questioned UMNO's commitment to Islamic principles and called for greater Islamisation.

Gerakan also broadened its electoral appeal by nominating several figures associated with the Chinese education movement.

During the campaign, Negeri Sembilan State Assembly Speaker Taha Talib was shot dead outside his home on 14 April, eight days before polling. The murder attracted widespread public attention and later resulted in the arrest and conviction of Culture, Youth and Sports Minister Mokhtar Hashim.

== Results ==
The election resulted in Barisan Nasional consolidating its electoral dominance, particularly among Malay voters. The coalition also recorded its strongest performance among Chinese voters since the 1964 general election. Contemporary political commentators attributed Barisan Nasional's improved performance in urban constituencies to strong support from first-time voters, while noting that the Democratic Action Party's vote share remained largely unchanged in many of its traditional strongholds.

Party or alliance		Votes	%	Seats	+/–
Barisan Nasional	United Malays National Organisation	1,323,937	31.78	70	+1
Barisan Nasional	Malaysian Chinese Association	678,206	16.28	24	+7
Barisan Nasional	Sabah People's United Front	81,963	1.97	10	+2
Barisan Nasional	Parti Pesaka Bumiputera Bersatu	28,700	0.69	8	0
Barisan Nasional	Sarawak National Party	41,295	0.99	6	–3
Barisan Nasional	Sarawak United Peoples' Party	81,993	1.97	5	–1
Barisan Nasional	Parti Gerakan Rakyat Malaysia	146,654	3.52	5	+1
Barisan Nasional	Malaysian Indian Congress	79,825	1.92	4	+1
Barisan Nasional	United Sabah National Organisation	30,816	0.74	0	–5
Barisan Nasional	BERJASA	28,690	0.69	0	0
Barisan Nasional	Total	2,522,079	60.54	132	+2
Democratic Action Party		815,473	19.58	9	–7
Pan-Malaysian Islamic Party		602,530	14.46	5	0
Parti Sosialis Rakyat Malaysia		38,800	0.93	0	0
United Pasok Nunukragang National Organisation		14,958	0.36	0	New
Sabah Chinese Consolidated Party		11,600	0.28	0	New
Parti Anak Jati Sarawak		1,415	0.03	0	0
PEKEMAS		619	0.01	0	0
Social Democratic Party		464	0.01	0	0
Social United Association Party		352	0.01	0	0
Sarawak People's Organisation		178	0.00	0	–1
Independents		157,229	3.77	8	+6
Total		4,165,697	100.00	154	0
Valid votes		4,165,697	96.96		
Invalid/blank votes		130,615	3.04		
Total votes		4,296,312	100.00		
Registered voters/turnout		5,775,605	74.39		
Source: CLEA Tindak Malaysia Github

Total Registered Voters above refer to the total electorate of contested constituencies. Total Electorate for whole of 1982 inclusive 12 uncontested constituencies was 6081628.

There is conflicting information whether Berjasa was allocated to one or two parliamentary constituencies (subject which source being referenced too.

=== By state ===
==== Johore ====
Party or alliance		Votes	%	Seats	+/–
Barisan Nasional	United Malays National Organisation	193,999	45.75	11	0
Barisan Nasional	Malaysian Chinese Association	97,598	23.01	4	0
Barisan Nasional	Malaysian Indian Congress	20,932	4.94	1	New
Barisan Nasional	Total	312,529	73.70	16	0
Democratic Action Party		71,351	16.83	0	–1
Pan-Malaysian Islamic Party		18,224	4.30	0	0
Parti Sosialis Rakyat Malaysia		21,288	5.02	0	0
Independents		683	0.16	0	0
Total		424,075	100.00	16	0
Valid votes		424,075	95.56		
Invalid/blank votes		19,725	4.44		
Total votes		443,800	100.00		
Registered voters/turnout		587,458	75.55		

Total Registered voters above refer to the total electorate of contested constituencies. Total Electorate for Johor inclusive 4 uncontested constituencies was 757837.

==== Kedah ====
Party or alliance		Votes	%	Seats	+/–
Barisan Nasional	United Malays National Organisation	194,826	47.95	10	+1
Barisan Nasional	Malaysian Chinese Association	39,951	9.83	2	0
Barisan Nasional	BERJASA	14,039	3.46	0	0
Barisan Nasional	Total	248,816	61.24	12	+1
Pan-Malaysian Islamic Party		131,872	32.46	1	–1
Democratic Action Party		24,354	5.99	0	0
Independents		1,271	0.31	0	0
Total		406,313	100.00	13	0
Valid votes		406,313	97.15		
Invalid/blank votes		11,938	2.85		
Total votes		418,251	100.00		
Registered voters/turnout		541,914	77.18		

==== Kelantan ====
Party or alliance		Votes	%	Seats	+/–
Barisan Nasional	United Malays National Organisation	157,341	48.28	8	–2
Barisan Nasional	BERJASA	14,651	4.50	0	0
Barisan Nasional	Total	171,992	52.78	8	-2
Pan-Malaysian Islamic Party		151,629	46.53	4	+2
Democratic Action Party		1,896	0.58	0	0
Independents		348	0.11	0	0
Total		325,865	100.00	12	0
Valid votes		325,865	97.33		
Invalid/blank votes		8,945	2.67		
Total votes		334,810	100.00		
Registered voters/turnout		418,242	80.05		

==== Kuala Lumpur ====
Party or alliance		Votes	%	Seats	+/–
Democratic Action Party		133,442	46.80	3	0
Barisan Nasional	Malaysian Chinese Association	81,611	28.62	1	+1
Barisan Nasional	Parti Gerakan Rakyat Malaysia	28,163	9.88	0	-1
Barisan Nasional	United Malays National Organisation	32,348	11.35	1	0
Barisan Nasional	Total	142,122	49.85	2	0
Pan-Malaysian Islamic Party		7,979	2.80	0	0
Independents		1,582	0.55	0	New
Total		285,125	100.00	5	0
Valid votes		285,125	98.88		
Invalid/blank votes		3,239	1.12		
Total votes		288,364	100.00		
Registered voters/turnout		406,782	70.89		

==== Malacca ====
Party or alliance		Votes	%	Seats	+/–
Barisan Nasional	United Malays National Organisation	52,884	32.45	2	0
Barisan Nasional	Malaysian Chinese Association	55,397	33.99	1	0
Barisan Nasional	Total	108,281	66.44	3	0
Democratic Action Party		34,584	21.22	1	0
Pan-Malaysian Islamic Party		20,105	12.34	0	0
Total		162,970	100.00	4	0
Valid votes		162,970	96.77		
Invalid/blank votes		5,438	3.23		
Total votes		168,408	100.00		
Registered voters/turnout		219,236	76.82		

==== Negeri Sembilan ====
Party or alliance		Votes	%	Seats	+/–
Barisan Nasional	United Malays National Organisation	69,072	35.36	3	0
Barisan Nasional	Malaysian Chinese Association	43,454	22.24	2	+1
Barisan Nasional	Malaysian Indian Congress	18,937	9.69	1	0
Barisan Nasional	Total	131,463	67.30	6	+1
Democratic Action Party		53,592	27.43	0	–1
Pan-Malaysian Islamic Party		8,751	4.48	0	0
Independents		1,539	0.79	0	0
Total		195,345	100.00	6	0
Valid votes		195,345	96.88		
Invalid/blank votes		6,301	3.12		
Total votes		201,646	100.00		
Registered voters/turnout		261,632	77.07		

==== Pahang ====
Party or alliance		Votes	%	Seats	+/–
Barisan Nasional	United Malays National Organisation	113,518	48.66	6	0
Barisan Nasional	Malaysian Chinese Association	27,378	11.74	2	0
Barisan Nasional	Total	140,896	60.39	8	0
Pan-Malaysian Islamic Party		46,951	20.12	0	0
Democratic Action Party		40,016	17.15	0	0
Independents		5,434	2.33	0	0
Total		233,297	100.00	8	0
Valid votes		233,297	96.22		
Invalid/blank votes		9,160	3.78		
Total votes		242,457	100.00		
Registered voters/turnout		325,831	74.41		

==== Penang ====
Party or alliance		Votes	%	Seats	+/–
Barisan Nasional	United Malays National Organisation	57,487	16.69	3	+1
Barisan Nasional	Malaysian Chinese Association	71,870	20.87	2	+1
Barisan Nasional	Parti Gerakan Rakyat Malaysia	64,253	18.66	2	+1
Barisan Nasional	Total	193,610	56.23	7	+3
Democratic Action Party		124,089	36.04	2	–2
Parti Sosialis Rakyat Malaysia		15,944	4.63	0	0
Pan-Malaysian Islamic Party		8,612	2.50	0	–1
Social Democratic Party		464	0.13	0	0
Independents		1,626	0.47	0	0
Total		344,345	100.00	9	0
Valid votes		344,345	97.25		
Invalid/blank votes		9,746	2.75		
Total votes		354,091	100.00		
Registered voters/turnout		460,387	76.91		

==== Perak ====
Party or alliance		Votes	%	Seats	+/–
Barisan Nasional	United Malays National Organisation	164,042	26.99	11	+1
Barisan Nasional	Malaysian Chinese Association	138,927	22.86	6	+3
Barisan Nasional	Parti Gerakan Rakyat Malaysia	54,238	8.92	3	+1
Barisan Nasional	Malaysian Indian Congress	14,930	2.46	1	0
Barisan Nasional	Total	372,137	61.23	21	+4
Democratic Action Party		154,472	25.42	0	–4
Pan-Malaysian Islamic Party		79,264	13.04	0	0
PEKEMAS		619	0.10	0	0
Independents		1,297	0.21	0	0
Total		607,789	100.00	21	0
Valid votes		607,789	96.79		
Invalid/blank votes		20,135	3.21		
Total votes		627,924	100.00		
Registered voters/turnout		848,885	73.97		

In 1978, Bagan Datok was contested by Dato' Haji Hassan Adli as BN-Direct Candidate (no party affiliation). In 1982, Bagan Datok was contested by UMNO. This explains seat won change for UMNO increased by one (while collectively BN only had net increase of 4 seats when comparing from 1982 with 1978 results)

==== Perlis ====
Party or alliance		Votes	%	Seats	+/–
Barisan Nasional	United Malays National Organisation	39,715	67.80	2	0
Pan-Malaysian Islamic Party		18,860	32.20	0	0
Total		58,575	100.00	2	0
Valid votes		58,575	96.25		
Invalid/blank votes		2,283	3.75		
Total votes		60,858	100.00		
Registered voters/turnout		79,018	77.02		

==== Sabah ====
Party or alliance		Votes	%	Seats	+/–
Barisan Nasional	Sabah People's United Front	81,963	38.35	10	+2
Barisan Nasional	United Sabah National Organisation	30,816	14.42	0	–5
Barisan Nasional	Total	112,779	52.77	10	–3
Democratic Action Party		18,641	8.72	1	0
United Pasok Nunukragang National Organisation		14,958	7.00	0	0
Sabah Chinese United Party		11,600	5.43	0	0
Social United Association Party		352	0.16	0	0
Independents		55,382	25.91	5	+3
Total		213,712	100.00	16	0
Valid votes		213,712	98.09		
Invalid/blank votes		4,163	1.91		
Total votes		217,875	100.00		
Registered voters/turnout		324,199	67.20		

The above registered voter count refers to total electorate of contested constituencies. Total Electorate for Sabah inclusive two uncontested constituencies would be 358609.

==== Sarawak ====
Party or alliance		Votes	%	Seats	+/–
Barisan Nasional	Sarawak United Peoples' Party	81,993	30.62	5	–1
Barisan Nasional	Sarawak National Party	41,295	15.42	6	–3
Barisan Nasional	Parti Pesaka Bumiputera Bersatu	28,700	10.72	8	0
Barisan Nasional	Total	151,988	56.75	19	–4
Democratic Action Party		48,623	18.16	2	+2
Parti Anak Jati Sarawak		1,415	0.53	0	0
Sarawak People's Organisation		178	0.07	0	–1
Independents		65,594	24.49	3	+3
Total		267,798	100.00	24	0
Valid votes		267,798	97.22		
Invalid/blank votes		7,656	2.78		
Total votes		275,454	100.00		
Registered voters/turnout		412,158	66.83		

The above registered voter count refers to total electorate of contested constituencies. Total Electorate for Sarawak inclusive six uncontested constituencies would be 513392.

==== Selangor ====
Party or alliance		Votes	%	Seats	+/–
Barisan Nasional	United Malays National Organisation	141,836	31.22	6	0
Barisan Nasional	Malaysian Chinese Association	122,020	26.86	4	+1
Barisan Nasional	Malaysian Indian Congress	25,026	5.51	1	0
Barisan Nasional	Total	288,882	63.58	11	+1
Democratic Action Party		110,413	24.30	0	–1
Pan-Malaysian Islamic Party		33,292	7.33	0	0
Independents		21,754	4.79	0	0
Total		454,341	100.00	11	0
Valid votes		454,341	96.97		
Invalid/blank votes		14,175	3.03		
Total votes		468,516	100.00		
Registered voters/turnout		647,761	72.33		

==== Trengganu ====
Party or alliance		Votes	%	Seats	+/–
Barisan Nasional	United Malays National Organisation	106,869	57.41	7	0
Pan-Malaysian Islamic Party		76,991	41.36	0	0
Parti Sosialis Rakyat Malaysia		1,568	0.84	0	0
Independents		719	0.39	1	0
Total		186,147	100.00	8	0
Valid votes		186,147	96.02		
Invalid/blank votes		7,711	3.98		
Total votes		193,858	100.00		
Registered voters/turnout		242,092	80.08		

== Conduct ==
Polling, vote counting and post-election celebrations proceeded without major security incidents, despite closely contested races in several constituencies.

== Aftermath ==
Singapore Prime Minister Lee Kuan Yew congratulated Mahathir on Barisan Nasional's victory, describing it as "a massive vote of confidence" and expressing confidence that the result would strengthen bilateral cooperation and ASEAN solidarity.

Korean President Chun Doo-hwan also congratulated Mahathir, expressing confidence in Malaysia's continued progress and prosperity and hope for closer relations between the two countries.

== See also ==
- Members of the Dewan Rakyat, 6th Malaysian Parliament
- 1982 Malaysian state elections
- First premiership of Mahathir Mohamad
