= John Gaisah =

Musical artist (1955–1981)

Datuk John Gaisah
- Born: Joannes Lapius @ John Gaisah; 8 April 1955; Kampung Sunsuron, Tambunan, Crown Colony of North Borneo
- Died: 11 August 1981 (aged 26); Jalan Penampang Lama (Old Penampang Road), Penampang, Sabah, Malaysia
- Other name: Tom Jones of Sabah
- Occupations: Singer; Musician; Lyricist; Songwriter; Composer
- Years active: 1973–1981
- Musical career
- Genres: Pop and World music
- Instrument: Vocals
- Labels: Kinabalu Recording; Bamboo Sound Recording Studio

Datuk John Gaisah (8 April 1955 – 11 August 1981) was a Kadazandusun musician in Sabah, Malaysia. He competed in the national Bintang RTM competition in 1976, where he placed third. He was a versatile talent, being a singer, composer, lyricist, and musician.

He was confirmed dead at the Queen Elizabeth Hospital, Kota Kinabalu after the car he was driving was involved in a road accident in Penampang on 11 August 1981. In 2025, Jeffrey Kitingan, the then-Deputy Chief Minister I of Sabah who was also a fellow Tambunan Dusun native like him, proposed that a memorial to Gaisah should be erected in Tambunan, stating that Gaisah is still remembered as a "legendary artist" by today's generation and that a memorial would bring visitors to the area.

== Popular songs ==
Among some of John Gaisah's songs are;

- Tolu Toun Pitongkiadan
- Soira Osorou Ku (Esther Om Edith)
- Mogot Daa Dokoyu Sanganu Dika
- Kada Oku Nodi Soroho
- Alicia Koupusan Ku
- Kilung-Kilungan
- Miniagal Do Sinsing
- Taragang Rasuk
- Kada Tokou Pogililihu
- Oi Gidi
- Logupon Ku Romou Ku
- Muli-uli Togodon Oku Sawo (feat. Molly Alina Majinggol)
- Joget Tintod Do Mamanau
