= 1986 Sabah state election =

State election in Sabah, Malaysia

- 4–5 May 1986

All 48 seats in the Sabah State Legislative Assembly 25 seats needed for a majority
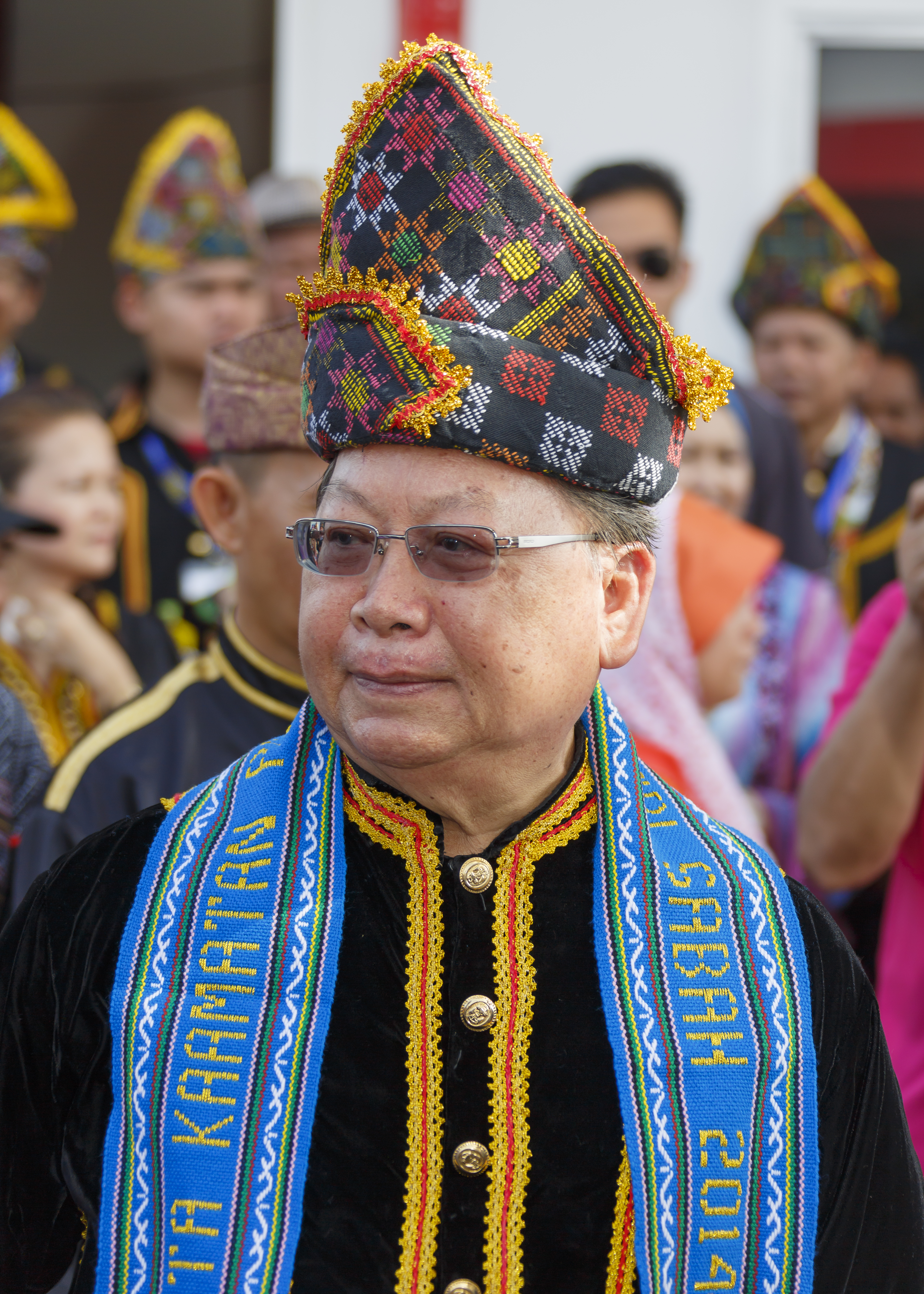

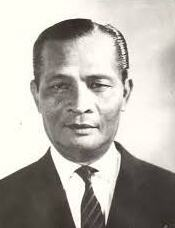

	Majority party	Minority party	Third party
Leader	Joseph Pairin Kitingan	Mustapha Harun	Mohammad Noor Mansoor
Party	PBS	USNO	BERJAYA
Alliance			Barisan Nasional (federal)
Leader since	1985	1981
Leader's seat	Tambunan	Not contesting	Buang Sayang
Last election	25 seats	16 seats	6 seats
Seats won	34	12	1
Seat change	▲9	▼4	▼5
	Fourth party
Leader	Unknown
Party	SCCP
Leader's seat	Unknown
Last election	Not contesting
Seats won	1
Seat change	▲1
Chief Minister before election
Joseph Pairin Kitingan
PBS
Elected Chief Minister
Joseph Pairin Kitingan
Barisan Nasional, (PBS)

The 1986 Sabah state election was held between Sunday, 4 May and Monday, 5 May 1986. The snap election was called by chief minister Pairin Kitingan in response to civil disturbances and political defections following the results of the 1985 state election.

The election was won by Pairin's Parti Bersatu Sabah which kept all its seats and gained 9 more (4 from USNO, 4 from Berjaya and the only seat held by Pasok). Berjaya lost all 6 seats it held (4 to PBS, 1 to USNO and 1 to SCCP) but gained one new seat from USNO. USNO had a net loss of 4 seats (losing 4 to PBS and exchanging 1 with Berjaya).

== Results ==
Party	Votes	%	Seats	+/–
United Sabah Party (PBS)	166,136	53.71	34	+9
United Sabah National Organisation (Usno)	62,674	20.26	12	–4
Sabah People's United Front (Berjaya)	54,124	17.50	1	–5
Sabah Chinese Consolidated Party (SCCP)	7,602	2.46	1	New
United Pasok Nunukragang National Organisation (Pasok)	1,615	0.52	0	0
Sabah Chinese Party (SCP)	4,006	1.30	0	New
Independents	13,149	4.25	0	0
Total	309,306	100.00	48	0
Valid votes	309,306	98.96		
Invalid/blank votes	3,239	1.04		
Total votes	312,545	100.00		
Registered voters/turnout	423,097	73.87		
Source: HLSC

== Aftermath ==
The SCCP candidate who has won in the election, quit his party and joined PBS 2 days after the election. This was the final state election SCCP participates, as the party were dissolved before the 1990 state election.

Pairin was sworn in as Chief Minister on the next day after the election results, together with the state EXCO members. Pairin also announces PBS have applied to join Barisan Nasional (BN) as component party on the same day. PBS were accepted as BN component party in June, as well as USNO, who were readmitted into BN having been expelled in 1984.

Berjaya later would pull out of BN before the 1986 Malaysian general election.
