= United Pasok Nunukragang National Organisation =

United Pasok Nunukragang National Organisation Pertubuhan Kebangsaan Pasok Nunukragang Bersatu
- Abbreviation: PASOK
- Leader: Disputed
- Founder: O.K.K Sedomon Gunsanad; G. S. Sundang
- Founded: 1978
- Dissolved: 2008
- Split from: United Sabah National Organisation
- Headquarters: Kota Kinabalu, Malaysia
- Ideology: Nationalism; Regionalism
- National affiliation: Sabah Front (1981-1986)

Party flag

Website
- pasokranau.googlepages.com

The United Pasok Nunukragang National Organisation (Malay: Pertubuhan Kebangsaan Pasok Nunukragang Bersatu; PASOK) was a regional political party in Malaysia based in the state of Sabah. It was established in 1978. Before its deregistration, it was the oldest political party in Sabah that was currently still in existence. Despite being a party that maintains a Kadazan-Dusun ethnocentric platform, membership is opened to all ethnicities and the party's leadership has multi-ethnic representation.

The term Nunukragang refers to Nunuk Ragang, the traditional birthplace of the Kadazan-Dusun culture and civilisation.

== Political platform ==
PASOK subscribes to a 7-point political platform:

- To foster and to promote national unity and harmony amongst the indigenous people of Sabah;
- To instill and promote mutual confidence and goodwill amongst the people of Sabah irrespective of race and religion;
- To safeguard and to protect the rightful position, rights and knowledge of the indigenous people of Sabah;
- To uphold and to promote the 5 principles of the Rukun Negara as National Philosophy.
- To safeguard and promote the traditional customs and cultures of the Indigenous people and to preserve the freedom of worship;
- To uphold and promote the principles of parliamentary and democratic form of government through harmony and consensus.
- To work with other political organisations with similar aims and objectives within Malaysia so as to uphold the healthy development of party politics.

== History ==
PASOK was established in 1978 by the brother of O.K.K Sedomon Gunsanad, G. S. Sundang, a traditional chief (bearing the title Orang Kaya Kaya) and former Deputy Chief Minister of the Sabah as a political vehicle for the Kadazan, Dusun, and Murut peoples. In 1985, PASOK joined the newly formed Sabah United Party (PBS) in a coalition government after the latter won the 1985 state legislative elections. PASOK won its only seat in the state legislature to date when the then party president, Ignatius Stephen Malanjum, won the Moyog state constituency.

=== Recent developments ===
PASOK was denied the opportunity to contest with its own name and symbol in the 2008 general elections due to an ongoing feud involving rival claimants to the party presidency. PASOK candidates that were originally slated to stand either chose to stand as independent candidates or dropped out from the elections.

On 28 February 2008, the Registrar of Societies issued a revocation of registration notice to PASOK citing the failure of the party to resolve their leadership crisis involving Cleftus Mojinggol, John Richard Jayasuria and Hendry Sabagang Rumpit who had all claimed the party's presidency. The party was then de-registered on 27 May although one of the claimants claimed that he had yet to receive the notice from the Registrar and that the party leadership crisis had been solved following a delegate's conference that had elected new office bearers on 23 May 2008.

The party was deregistered in 2008.

== Prominent members ==
While not having had much electoral success, PASOK has seen many prominent members of Sabahan society go through its ranks:

- G. S. Sundang

Traditional Chief, founder of the United Pasok-Momogun Kadazan Organisation and Deputy Chief Minister of Sabah (1965–1967)

- Joseph Pairin Kitingan

Huguan Siou (Paramount leader) of the Kadazandusun community, former Chief Minister of Sabah (1985–1994) and current Deputy Chief Minister and State Minister for Infrastructure Development

- Wilfred Bumburing

Member of Parliament for Tuaran from 2008 to 2013

- James Vitalis

Former Deputy Speaker of the Sabah State Assembly

- Patrick Sindu

President of the Consumer Affairs Association for Sabah and Labuan

== Government offices ==
=== State governments ===
- Sabah (1985–1986)

Note: bold as Premier/Chief Minister, italic as junior partner

== General election results ==
Election	Total seats won	Seats contested	Total votes	Share of votes	Outcome of election	Election leader
1982	0 / 154	23			0 seat; No representation in Parliament	N/A
2004	0 / 219	21	543	0.00%	0 seat; No representation in Parliament	N/A
2008	0 / 222	21	1,023	0.01%	0 seat; No representation in Parliament	N/A

== State election results ==
Sabah State Legislative Assembly
Election	Votes		Seats			Position	Status
Election	Count	%	Result	Won / contested	+/–	Position	Status
1981	17,250	7.4	0 / 48	0 / 27	Steady	3rd	No seats
1985	5,988	2.2	1 / 48	1 / 9	▲1	▲4th	PBS–PASOK
1986	1,615	0.5	0 / 48	0 / 2	▼1	▼6th	No seats
1990	Did not contest						No seats
1994	Did not contest						No seats
1999	18	0.0	0 / 48	0 / 1	Steady	▲6th	No seats
2004	5,283	1.3	0 / 60	0 / 13	Steady	▲5th	No seats
2008	Did not contest						No seats

== See also ==
- List of political parties in Malaysia
- Politics of Malaysia
