= Salleh Said Keruak =

Malaysian politician

Yang Berbahagia Datuk Seri Panglima Salleh Said Keruak SPDK DGSM PGDK JP
- صالح سعيد کرواق
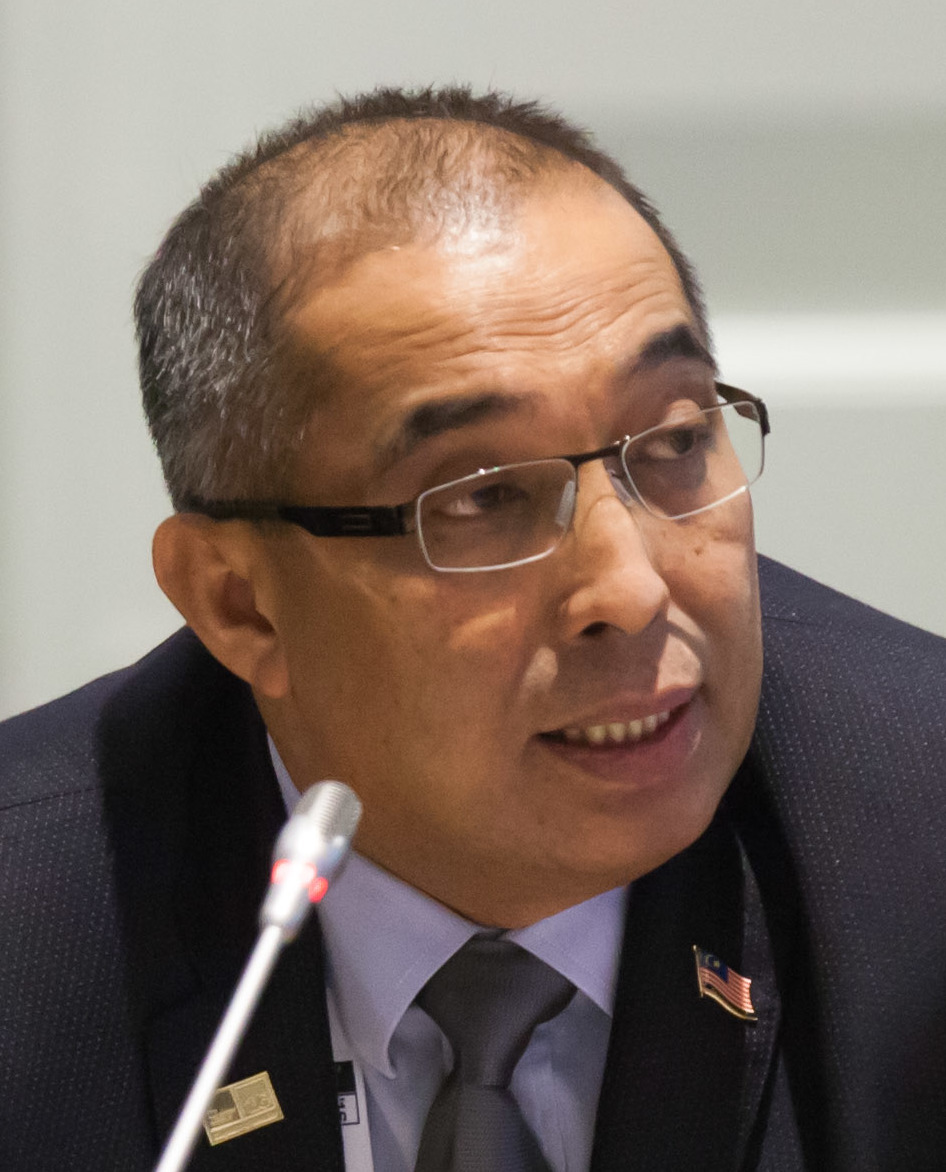
- Salleh Said Keruak at the ITU Telecom World 2016

Minister of Communications and Multimedia
- In office 29 July 2015 – 10 May 2018
- Monarchs: Abdul Halim (2015–2016); Muhammad V (2016–2018)
- Prime Minister: Najib Razak
- Deputy: Jailani Johari
- Preceded by: Ahmad Shabery Cheek
- Succeeded by: Gobind Singh Deo
- Constituency: Senator

9th Chief Minister of Sabah
- In office 28 December 1994 – 28 May 1996
- Governor: Mohammad Said Keruak (1994); Sakaran Dandai (1994–1996)
- Deputy: Abdul Ghapur Salleh; Yong Teck Lee; Joseph Kurup
- Preceded by: Sakaran Dandai
- Succeeded by: Yong Teck Lee
- Constituency: Usukan

Speaker of the Sabah State Legislative Assembly
- In office 31 December 2010 – 28 July 2015
- Governor: Ahmadshah Abdullah; Juhar Mahiruddin
- Chief Minister: Musa Aman
- Preceded by: Juhar Mahiruddin
- Succeeded by: Syed Abas Syed Ali
- Constituency: Non-MLA (2010–2013); Usukan (2013–2018)

Senator Appointed by the Yang di-Pertuan Agong
- In office 29 July 2015 – 28 April 2018
- Monarchs: Abdul Halim (2015–2016); Muhammad V (2016–2018)
- Prime Minister: Najib Razak

Member of the Malaysian Parliament for Kota Belud
- In office 25 April 1995 – 8 March 2008
- Preceded by: Paul Maidom Pansai (PBS)
- Succeeded by: Abdul Rahman Dahlan (BN–UMNO)
- Majority: 7,131 (1995); 9,216 (1999); 10,421 (2004)

Member of the Sabah State Legislative Assembly for Usukan
- In office 26 September 2020 – 29 November 2025
- Preceded by: Japlin Akim (BN–UMNO)
- Succeeded by: Isnaraissah Munirah Majilis (WARISAN)
- Majority: 4,298 (2020)
- In office 5 May 2013 – 9 May 2018
- Preceded by: Japlin Akim (BN–UMNO)
- Succeeded by: Japlin Akim (BN–UMNO)
- Majority: 6,812 (2013)
- In office 19 February 1994 – 21 March 2004
- Preceded by: Mustapha Harun (BN–UMNO)
- Succeeded by: Japlin Akim (BN–UMNO)
- Majority: 2,683 (1994); 3,624 (1999)

Ministerial Roles (Sabah)
- 1994: Deputy Chief Minister
- 1994: Minister of Finance
- 2001–2004: Minister of Housing and Local Government

Faction represented in Dewan Negara
- 2015–2018: Barisan Nasional

Faction represented in Dewan Rakyat
- 1995–2008: Barisan Nasional

Faction represented in Sabah State Legislative Assembly
- 1994–2004: Barisan Nasional
- 2013–2018: Barisan Nasional
- 2020–: Barisan Nasional

Personal details
- Born: Md Salleh bin Md Said; 10 July 1957 (age 69) (Note: "Mensyukuri Rahmat Hidup dan Kesihatan Sempena Hari Jadi" (in Malay).) Kota Belud, North Borneo (now Sabah, Malaysia)
- Citizenship: Malaysia
- Party: United Sabah Party (PBS) (until 1991); United Malays National Organisation of Sabah (Sabah UMNO) (until 2018, since 2020); Independent (2018–2020) (Note: "Sejarah Datuk Seri Panglima Salleh Tun Said Keruak" (in Malay).) (Note: Prior to 1991, he was a member of the PBS party.)
- Other political affiliations: Barisan Nasional (BN) (until 2018, since 2020)
- Spouse(s): Raya Erom (born 21 April 1963, m. 1984)
- Relations: Isnaraissah Munirah Majilis (Second cousin); Saddi Abdul Rahman (Affinal)
- Children: 2 sons, 2 daughters
- Parent(s): Mohammad Said Keruak (died 1995); Bandung Hasbollah (died 2016)
- Education: Simon Fraser University; Universiti Putra Malaysia
- Profession: Politician

Md Salleh bin Md Said (Jawi: محمد صالح بن محمد سعيد; born 10 July 1957), commonly known as Salleh Said Keruak, is a Malaysian politician who has served as Member of the Sabah State Legislative Assembly (MLA) for Usukan from February 1994 to March 2004, from May 2013 to May 2018 and again since September 2020. He served as the Minister of Communications and Multimedia in the Barisan Nasional (BN) administration under former Prime Minister Najib Razak from July 2015 to the collapse of the BN administration in May 2018, 9th Chief Minister of Sabah from December 1994 to May 1996, Speaker of the Sabah State Legislative Assembly from December 2010 to July 2015, Senator from July 2015 to July 2018 and Member of Parliament (MP) for Kota Belud from April 1995 to March 2008.

== Educational background ==
He Is a bachelor's graduate from Simon Fraser University in political science and holds a PhD in political science and government from Universiti Putra Malaysia.

== Career ==
After finishing his further studies, he was designated as Kota Belud District Officer from 1984 to 1986 and later became a Political Secretary to the sitting Chief Minister's administration from 1986 to 1994.

In addition, he also held some positions in the Cabinet of Sabah. For many years, he served as the Minister of Finance, Minister of Local Government and Housing and Deputy Chief Minister.

On 28 December 1994, Prime Minister Mahathir Mohamad nominated him as the Chief Minister of the state. His tenure as the state's Chief Minister ended on 28 May 1996 and was succeeded by Sabah Progressive Party (SAPP) President, Yong Teck Lee.

On 4 January 2010, then-Chief Minister, Musa Aman, appointed him as his government's Science and Technology Adviser with ministerial rank. He succeeded Tham Nyip Shen, a former Deputy Chief Minister for the ethnic Chinese quota who hailed from Keningau.

Later on 31 December of the same year, he was appointed the Speaker of the State Legislature. A day later, on the first day of 2011, he was appointed the Chairman of Malaysian National Film Development Corporation (FINAS) by the then-Federal Minister of Information, Communications and Culture, Dr. Rais Yatim.

Under the party of United Malays National Organisation (UMNO), he previously served Sabah state liaison committee deputy chairperson from 2006 to 2018, serving under the long-term chairmanship of then-Chief Minister, Musa Aman who was concurrently the state liaison committee chairperson from 2003 to 2018 (but now he currently serves as its elections machinery director since the crucial party elections in 2018).

In addition, he also presides over the United Sabah Bajau Organisation (USBO).

On 6 October 2019, he admitted that he submitted a party membership application to the People’s Justice Party (PKR) as the party is multiracial and it is in line with Salleh's political beliefs, especially focusing on the future of the Malaysian state in East Malaysia, Sabah.

On 30 June 2020, he canceled his application to join PKR in the aftermath of the 2020 political crisis. On 9 September 2020, Salleh rejoined UMNO.

== Family ==
He is the son of Mohammad Said Keruak, the 7th Yang di-Pertua Negeri of Sabah and the 4th Chief Minister of Sabah.

He is currently married to Datin Seri Panglima Datuk Raya Erom (born 21 April 1963), an ethnic Kadazandusun woman of Lotud descent from Tuaran, since 18 December 1984. Prior to their marriage, she was a Roman Catholic Christian before converting to Sunni Islam in order to marry Salleh. The couple are blessed with two sons and two daughters: Mohd Syarulnizam (born 1986), Syazeera (born 1988), Mohd Hafeez (born 1996) and Syeera (born 2002).

In addition, Salleh is also the second cousin of Isnaraissah Munirah Majilis, the incumbent Kota Belud MP.

== Election results ==
Parliament of Malaysia
Year	Constituency	Candidate	Votes	Pct	Opponent(s)	Votes	Pct	Ballots cast	Majority	Turnout
1995	P148 Kota Belud	Salleh Said Keruak (UMNO)	17,368	62.92%	Herbert Timbun Lagadan (PBS)	10,237	37.08%	27,920	7,131	81.71%
1999	P148 Kota Belud	Salleh Said Keruak (UMNO)	7,817	62.16%	Saidil Simoi (PBS)	8,601	30.01%	28,931	9,216	77.55%
1999	P148 Kota Belud	Salleh Said Keruak (UMNO)	7,817	62.16%	Bandira Aling (PAS)	1,515	5.28%	28,931	9,216	77.55%
1999	P148 Kota Belud	Salleh Said Keruak (UMNO)	7,817	62.16%	Paul Maidom Pansai (IND)	553	1.93%	28,931	9,216	77.55%
1999	P148 Kota Belud	Salleh Said Keruak (UMNO)	7,817	62.16%	Mul Marif (IND)	179	0.62%	28,931	9,216	77.55%
2004	P169 Kota Belud	Salleh Said Keruak (UMNO)	19,290	64.93%	James Baga (IND)	8,869	29.85%	30,794	10,421	75.20%
2004	P169 Kota Belud	Salleh Said Keruak (UMNO)	19,290	64.93%	Jaimin Giau (SETIA)	1,551	5.22%	30,794	10,421	75.20%
2018	P169 Kota Belud	Salleh Said Keruak (UMNO)	19,167	41.58%	Isnaraissah Munirah Majilis (WARISAN)	23,429	50.82%	47,271	4,262	82.12%
2018	P169 Kota Belud	Salleh Said Keruak (UMNO)	19,167	41.58%	Miasin Mion (PHRS)	2,092	4.54%	47,271	4,262	82.12%
2018	P169 Kota Belud	Salleh Said Keruak (UMNO)	19,167	41.58%	Laiman Ikin (PAS)	1,410	3.06%	47,271	4,262	82.12%

Sabah State Legislative Assembly
Year	Constituency	Candidate	Votes	Pct	Opponent(s)	Votes	Pct	Ballots cast	Majority	Turnout
1994	N08 Usukan	Salleh Said Keruak (UMNO)	6,274	61.67%	Datu Badaruddin Datu Mustapha (PBS)	3,591	35.30%	10,277	2,683	82.53%
1994	N08 Usukan	Salleh Said Keruak (UMNO)	6,274	61.67%	Semat Abdul Karim (SETIA)	159	1.56%	10,277	2,683	82.53%
1994	N08 Usukan	Salleh Said Keruak (UMNO)	6,274	61.67%	Salisi Ukoh (IND)	150	1.47%	10,277	2,683	82.53%
1999	N08 Usukan	Salleh Said Keruak (UMNO)	7,127	61.84%	Saidil Simoy (PBS)	3,503	30.40%	11,652	3,624	80.21%
1999	N08 Usukan	Salleh Said Keruak (UMNO)	7,127	61.84%	Mudry Nasir (BERSEKUTU)	894	7.76%	11,652	3,624	80.21%
2013	N08 Usukan	Salleh Said Keruak (UMNO)	10,879	70.85%	Mustapha Sakmud (PKR)	4,067	27.24%	15,603	6,812	83.40%
2013	N08 Usukan	Salleh Said Keruak (UMNO)	10,879	70.85%	Bakhruddin Ismail (STAR)	285	1.91%	15,603	6,812	83.40%
2020	N10 Usukan	Salleh Said Keruak (UMNO)	8,280	65.28%	Abdul Bakhrin Mohd Yusof (WARISAN)	3,982	31.40%	12,683	4,298	75.12%
2020	N10 Usukan	Salleh Said Keruak (UMNO)	8,280	65.28%	Datu Mohd Nazaruddin Datu Tiga Belas (PCS)	421	3.32%	12,683	4,298	75.12%
2025	N10 Usukan	Salleh Said Keruak (UMNO)		%	Japlin Akim (GAGASAN)		%			
2025	N10 Usukan	Salleh Said Keruak (UMNO)		%	Isnaraissah Munirah Majilis (WARISAN)		%			
2025	N10 Usukan	Salleh Said Keruak (UMNO)		%	(KDM)		%			
2025	N10 Usukan	Salleh Said Keruak (UMNO)		%	Mohd Lin Harun (STAR)		%			
2025	N10 Usukan	Salleh Said Keruak (UMNO)		%	Jefris Muadis (IMPIAN)		%			

== Honours ==
- Sabah
  - Grand Commander of the Order of Kinabalu (SPDK) – Datuk Seri Panglima (1996)
  - Commander of the Order of Kinabalu (PGDK) – Datuk (1990)
  - Justice of the Peace (JP) (2015)
- Malacca
  - Grand Commander of the Exalted Order of Malacca (DGSM) – Datuk Seri (1996)

== See also ==
- Members of the Dewan Negara, 13th Malaysian Parliament
- List of people who have served in both Houses of the Malaysian Parliament

Political offices
Preceded by Sakaran Dandai	Chief Minister of Sabah; 1994–1996	Succeeded by Yong Teck Lee
