= Isnaraissah Munirah Majilis =

Malaysian politician (born 1982)

Yang Berhormat Puan Isnaraissah Munirah Majilis ASDK MP MLA
- اغثنا الرئيسة منيرة مجلس
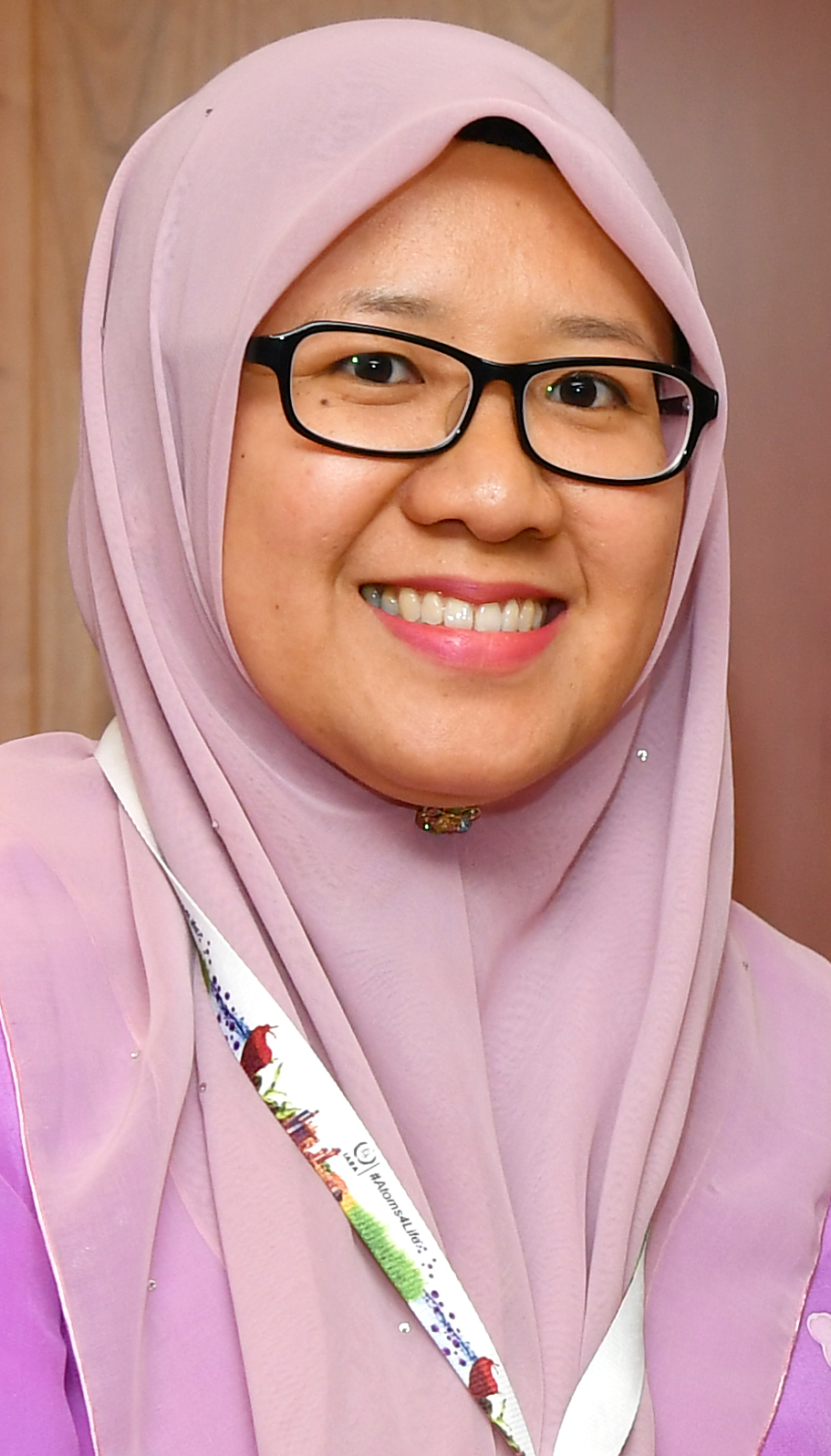
- Isnaraissah Munirah Majilis at the 11th International Kuala Lumpur Eco Film Fest 2018

Deputy Minister of Energy, Science, Technology, Environment and Climate Change
- In office 2 July 2018 – 24 February 2020
- Monarchs: Muhammad V (2018–2019); Abdullah (2019–2020)
- Prime Minister: Mahathir Mohamad
- Minister: Yeo Bee Yin
- Preceded by: Abu Bakar Mohamad Diah (Science, Technology); James Dawos Mamit (Energy); Hamim Samuri (Environment)
- Succeeded by: Ahmad Amzad Hashim (Science, Technology); Ali Biju (Energy); Ahmad Masrizal Muhammad (Environment)
- Constituency: Kota Belud

Member of the Sabah State Legislative Assembly for Usukan
- Incumbent
- Assumed office 29 November 2025
- Preceded by: Salleh Said Keruak (BN–UMNO)
- Majority: 442 (2025)

Member of the Malaysian Parliament for Kota Belud
- Incumbent
- Assumed office 9 May 2018
- Preceded by: Abdul Rahman Dahlan (BN–UMNO)
- Majority: 4,262 (2018); 4,582 (2022)

Personal details
- Born: Isnaraissah Munirah binti Majilis @ Fakharudy; 11 January 1982 (age 44) Kampung Taginambur, Kadamaian, Kota Belud, Sabah, Malaysia
- Party: People's Justice Party (PKR) (2011–2016); Heritage Party (WARISAN) (since 2016)
- Relations: Salleh Said Keruak (second cousin)
- Parents: Majilis @ Fakharudy Tanggau (father); Kamariah "Kay" Zakaria (mother)
- Education: Universiti Malaysia Sabah
- Occupation: Politician
- Profession: Electrical engineer

Isnaraissah Munirah binti Majilis @ Fakharudy (Jawi: اغثنا الرئيسة منيرة بنت مجلس @ فخرالرضي; born 11 January 1982) is a Malaysian politician and electrical engineer who has served as the Member of Parliament (MP) for Kota Belud since May 2018. She served as the Deputy Minister of Energy, Science, Technology, Environment and Climate Change in the Pakatan Harapan (PH) administration under former Prime Minister Mahathir Mohamad and former Minister Yeo Bee Yin from July 2018 to the collapse of the PH administration in February 2020. She is a member of the Heritage Party (WARISAN) and was a member of the People's Justice Party (PKR), a component party of the PH and formerly Pakatan Rakyat (PR) coalitions. She is also presently the sole female WARISAN MP.

== Personal life ==
Munirah was born in the town of Kota Belud of Sabah. She is the second cousin of Salleh Said Keruak.

== Political career ==
Munirah has been actively involved in politics since 2011 under the People's Justice Party (PKR). She has had always expressed hope that there would be a new chapter for Malaysia with a new government and wanted to be part of the change so that she can bring her hometown more opportunities for development. In 2016, she left the party to join a new Sabah-based Heritage Party (WARISAN). Besides actively in politics, Munirah is also an electrical engineer and is fluent in four languages namely English, Malay, Dusun and Bajau.

=== 2013 general election ===
In the 2013 election, Munirah was fielded by her party, PKR to face Abdul Rahman Dahlan of United Malays National Organisation (UMNO) in the Kota Belud parliamentary seat but lost.

=== 2018 general election ===
In the 2018 election, Munirah was again fielded, this time by her new party, WARISAN to contest the Kota Belud parliamentary seat, facing her second cousin, Salleh Said Keruak from UMNO and subsequently won.

=== 2022 general election ===
In the 2022 election, Munirah successfully defended her parliamentary seat and is one of only three WARISAN members who won in the election.

== Issue ==
=== Advocating for a gender sensitive parliament ===
Munirah was among the 33 women Member of Parliament calling for the Dewan Rakyat to be a gender-sensitive parliament in line with the guidelines of the Inter-Parliamentary Union.

== Election results ==
Parliament of Malaysia
Year	Constituency	Candidate	Votes	Pct	Opponent(s)	Votes	Pct	Ballot casts	Majority	Turnout
2013	P169 Kota Belud	Isnaraissah Munirah Majilis (PKR)	16,673	39.40%	Abdul Rahman Dahlan (Sabah UMNO)	21,768	51.44%	43,502	5,095	84.52%
2013	P169 Kota Belud	Isnaraissah Munirah Majilis (PKR)	16,673	39.40%	Jalumin Bayogoh (STAR)	2,709	6.40%	43,502	5,095	84.52%
2013	P169 Kota Belud	Isnaraissah Munirah Majilis (PKR)	16,673	39.40%	Lamsil Amidsor (Ind)	979	2.31%	43,502	5,095	84.52%
2013	P169 Kota Belud	Isnaraissah Munirah Majilis (PKR)	16,673	39.40%	Kanul Gindol (Ind)	185	0.44%	43,502	5,095	84.52%
2018	P169 Kota Belud	Isnaraissah Munirah Majilis (WARISAN)	23,429	50.82%	Salleh Said Keruak (Sabah UMNO)	19,167	41.58%	47,565	4,262	82.12%
2018	P169 Kota Belud	Isnaraissah Munirah Majilis (WARISAN)	23,429	50.82%	Miasin @ Aimaduddin Mion (PHRS)	2,092	4.54%	47,565	4,262	82.12%
2018	P169 Kota Belud	Isnaraissah Munirah Majilis (WARISAN)	23,429	50.82%	Laiman Ikin @ Ag Laiman Kakimin (PAS)	1,410	3.06%	47,565	4,262	82.12%
2022	P169 Kota Belud	Isnaraissah Munirah Majilis (WARISAN)	25,148	46.54%	Abdul Rahman Dahlan (Sabah UMNO)	20,566	38.06%	55,272	4,582	67.64%
2022	P169 Kota Belud	Isnaraissah Munirah Majilis (WARISAN)	25,148	46.54%	Madeli @ Modily Bangali (PKR)	8,323	15.40%	55,272	4,582	67.64%

Sabah State Legislative Assembly
Year	Constituency	Candidate	Votes	Pct	Opponent(s)	Votes	Pct	Ballots cast	Majority	Turnout
2025	N10 Usukan	Isnaraissah Munirah Majilis (WARISAN)	6,292	35.65%	Salleh Said Keruak (Sabah UMNO)	5,850	33.15%	17,905	442	73.88%
2025	N10 Usukan	Isnaraissah Munirah Majilis (WARISAN)	6,292	35.65%	Japlin Akim (GAGASAN)	5,179	29.34%	17,905	442	73.88%
2025	N10 Usukan	Isnaraissah Munirah Majilis (WARISAN)	6,292	35.65%	Mohd Lin Harun (STAR)	179	1.01%	17,905	442	73.88%
2025	N10 Usukan	Isnaraissah Munirah Majilis (WARISAN)	6,292	35.65%	Jefris Muadis (IMPIAN)	97	0.55%	17,905	442	73.88%
2025	N10 Usukan	Isnaraissah Munirah Majilis (WARISAN)	6,292	35.65%	Ajun Meliyon (IND)	52	0.29%	17,905	442	73.88%

== Honours ==
=== Honours of Malaysia ===
- Malaysia
  - Recipient of the 17th Yang di-Pertuan Agong Installation Medal (2025)
- Sabah
  - Companion of the Order of Kinabalu (ASDK) (2018)
