= Chua Jui Meng =

Malaysian politician (1943–2023)

Yang Berbahagia Dato' Chua Jui Meng SIMP DPMS
- 蔡锐明

Minister of Health
- In office 8 May 1995 – 26 March 2004
- Monarchs: Ja’afar (1995–1999); Salahuddin (1999–2001); Sirajuddin (2001–2004)
- Prime Minister: Mahathir Mohamad (1995–2003); Abdullah Ahmad Badawi (2003–2004)
- Deputy: Siti Zaharah Sulaiman (1995–1996); Mohd Ali Rustam (1996–1999); Suleiman Mohamed (1999–2004)
- Preceded by: Lee Kim Sai
- Succeeded by: Chua Soi Lek
- Constituency: Bakri

Member of the Malaysian Parliament for Bakri
- In office 3 August 1986 – 8 March 2008
- Preceded by: Position established
- Succeeded by: Er Teck Hwa (DAP)
- Majority: 1,105 (1986); 3,111 (1990); 12,318 (1995); 13,360 (1999); 19,059 (2004)

Personal details
- Born: 22 October 1943 Muar, Johor, Japanese-occupied Malaya
- Died: 3 December 2023 (aged 80) Sepang District, Selangor, Malaysia
- Party: Malaysian Chinese Association (MCA) (1976–2009); People's Justice Party (PKR) (2009–2023)
- Other political affiliations: Barisan Nasional (BN) (1976–2009); Pakatan Rakyat (PR) (2009–2015); Pakatan Harapan (PH) (2015–2023)
- Occupation: Politician
- Profession: Lawyer
- Website: chuajuimeng123.blogspot.com

Chua Jui Meng (simplified Chinese: 蔡锐明; traditional Chinese: 蔡銳明; pinyin: Cài Ruìmíng; Pe̍h-ōe-jī: Chhòa Jōe-bêng; 22 October 1943 – 3 December 2023) was a Malaysian politician and lawyer who served as the Minister of Health from May 1995 to March 2004 and the Member of Parliament (MP) for Bakri from August 1986 to March 2008. He was the longest-serving Minister of Health in the history of Malaysia by serving in the position for almost 9 years. He was also a member of the People's Justice Party (PKR), a component party of the Pakatan Harapan (PH) and formerly Pakatan Rakyat (PR) coalition as well as the Malaysian Chinese Association (MCA), a component party of the Barisan Nasional (BN) coalition. He also served as the State Chairman of PKR of Johor and the Vice-President of MCA.

== Background ==
Chua was a student activist in the 1970s. He was president of the Malaysian and Singaporean Law Society in the United Kingdom and Ireland as well as Editor in Chief of the Federation of UK and Ireland Malaysian and Singaporean Student Associations.

Chua was a lawyer called to the British Bar as a Barrister-at-law at the Inner Temple before entering politics through his participation in the Malaysian Chinese Association (MCA). After 35 years with the party, he quit to join People's Justice Party (PKR) in 2009.

== Political career ==
=== Malaysian Chinese Association (MCA) ===
Chua began his political career in 1976 when he became a member of the MCA, a component of the ruling Barisan Nasional (BN) coalition. In the 1986 general election, he was elected as Member of Parliament for Bakri, a seat he hold for five consecutive terms.

His speech in Parliament in 1988 on the "Malaysian Chinese dilemma" as a result of the "deviations and misimplementation" of the New Economic Policy (NEP) sparked the formation of the National Economic Consultative Council (NECC). In 1990 the NECC formulated the new National Development Policy (NDP) to succeed the NEP and it was adopted for a period of 10 years (1991–2000), which Chua credited as key to liberalising the economy, education and culture and turning Chinese voter in favour of Barisan Nasional from the 1990s to 2004.

In 1989, Chua was appointed parliamentary secretary for the Ministry of Health (MOH). He was elected as a vice-president of the MCA in 1990 and became the Deputy Minister of International Trade and Industry following the 1990 general election. During this period, he worked on developing small and medium enterprises and promoting trade with China.

After the 1995 general election, Chua was appointed Minister of Health by Prime Minister Mahathir Mohamad. During his tenure, Chua led the government's fight against the Coxsackievirus outbreak in 1997, the Nipah virus outbreak in 1999, the Japanese encephalitis outbreak in 2000 and the global SARS epidemic in 2003. The Sultanah Fatimah Specialist Hospital (HPSF) in Muar has gone through a variety of development and vast transformation into a specialist hospital under Chua's ministership in MOH and tenure as local-bred MP for Bakri. Its status was officially converted and renamed from Hospital Muar to Hospital Pakar Sultanah Fatimah on 13 October 2003.

MCA fell into crisis in 2001, when factional infighting between "Teams A" and "B" became public. Chua aligned himself to the Lim Ah Lek-led Team B during the Nanyang Siang Pau takeover crisis. The 2002 party elections were cancelled, and Chua retained his vice presidency under the MCA "peace plan" of 2003, which saw Ong Ka Ting assume the presidency. However, he was dropped from the Cabinet after the 2004 general election as he was not recommended to the prime minister by the new party leader.

In the following year's party elections, Chua challenged Ong Ka Ting for the presidency. He performed above expectations, garnering more than a third of the delegates' votes, but was unable to topple the heavily favoured Ong. He made another long-shot attempt at the presidency in 2008, but lost out to Ong Tee Keat. He did not contest the 2008 general election and 2013 general election as his former seat of Bakri fell to the opposition.

=== People's Justice Party (PKR) ===
In July 2009, Chua quit the MCA to join the opposition People's Justice Party (PKR), citing the need to preserve the two-party system that emerged after the 2008 elections. In June 2010, the Sultan of Johor, Sultan Ibrahim Ismail revoked the state awards carrying the titles Dato' conferred to Chua by the previous Sultan. Chua accused BN of instigating the move as payback for joining the opposition. He still retained the Dato' title of other state titles by the Sultans of Selangor and Pahang.

Chua was appointed PKR's chief in Johor, which is regarded as the BN's stronghold.

In February 2013, an open verbal conflict erupted between Johor DAP chairman Boo Cheng Hau and Chua as a result of accusations from either side of splitting Pakatan Rakyat (PR) in Johor, prompting mediation by both DAP and PKR party central leadership. Reconciliations were finally reached by both parties to switch their traditional seats for Chua to contest the Segamat, meanwhile DAP adviser Lim Kit Siang in the Gelang Patah seat in the 2013 election. Chua was however defeated in the election by the incumbent Dr. S. Subramaniam, a BN federal minister.

== Death ==
Chua died on 3 December 2023, at the age of 80. He had been hospitalised for a week following a heart attack.

== Election results ==
Parliament of Malaysia
| Year | Constituency | Candidate | Votes | Pct | Opponent(s) | Votes | Pct | Ballots cast | Majority | Turnout |
|---|---|---|---|---|---|---|---|---|---|---|
| 1986 | P122 Bakri | Chua Jui Meng (MCA) | 14,818 | 48.22% | Song Sing Kwee (DAP) | 13,713 | 44.62% | 30,729 | 1,105 | 71.32% |
| 1986 | P122 Bakri | Chua Jui Meng (MCA) | 14,818 | 48.22% | Hassan Hussein (PAS) | 1,437 | 4.68% | 30,729 | 1,105 | 71.32% |
| 1990 | P122 Bakri | Chua Jui Meng (MCA) | 18,730 | 52.68% | Lee Ban Chen (DAP) | 15,619 | 43.93% | 35,556 | 3,111 | 74.94% |
| 1995 | P132 Bakri | Chua Jui Meng (MCA) | 22,162 | 60.15% | Tan Kok Kwang (DAP) | 9,844 | 26.72% | 36,842 | 12,318 | 73.71% |
| 1995 | P132 Bakri | Chua Jui Meng (MCA) | 22,162 | 60.15% | Mohd Huridin Samuri (PAS) | 3,541 | 9.61% | 36,842 | 12,318 | 73.71% |
| 1999 | P132 Bakri | Chua Jui Meng (MCA) | 25,676 | 65.02% | Lim Sey Wee (DAP) | 12,316 | 31.19% | 39,486 | 13,360 | 74.15% |
| 2004 | P145 Bakri | Chua Jui Meng (MCA) | 29,320 | 70.34% | Azhari Ismail (DAP) | 10,261 | 24.62% | 41,684 | 19,059 | 73.85% |
| 2013 | P140 Segamat | Chua Jui Meng (PKR) | 18,820 | 47.28% | Subramaniam Sathasivam (MIC) | 20,037 | 50.34% | 39,807 | 1,217 | 84.68% |

== Honours ==
- Johor
  - Knight Grand Commander of the Order of the Crown of Johor (SPMJ) – Dato' (1999, revoked on 10 June 2010)
  - Knight Commander of the Order of the Crown of Johor (DPMJ) – Dato' (1997, revoked on 10 June 2010)
  - Second Class of the Sultan Ibrahim Medal (PIS II) (1989, revoked on 19 June 2010)
- Pahang
  - Knight Grand Companion of the Order of the Crown of Pahang (SIMP) – Dato' Indera (2002)
- Selangor
  - Knight Commander of the Order of the Crown of Selangor (DPMS) – Dato' (2003)

== See also ==
- Bakri (federal constituency)
