= Eric Majimbun =

Malaysian politician

Yang Berbahagia Datuk Eric Majimbun PGDK PPN

Member of the Malaysian Parliament for Sepanggar, Sabah
- In office 21 March 2004 – 5 May 2013
- Preceded by: New constituency
- Succeeded by: Jumat Idris (BN–UMNO)

Personal details
- Born: Enchin bin Majimbun @ Eric; 7 February 1950 (age 76) Kiansom village, Inanam, Jesselton, Crown Colony of North Borneo
- Party: Sabah Progressive Party (SAPP)
- Spouse: Sylvia Lobimi Siap
- Children: Edna Jessica, Eric Shone Jr, Evina Brenda and Elsie Erica
- Occupation: Politician

Eric Majimbun (born 7 February 1950) was the Member of the Parliament of Malaysia for the Sepanggar constituency in Sabah from 2004 to 2013, as a member of the Sabah Progressive Party (SAPP).

Majimbun was elected to federal Parliament in the 2004 election for the seat of Sepanggar. SAPP was a member of the governing Barisan Nasional coalition until it left in 2008, which Majimbun claimed gave him more freedom to represent his constituents. In the 2013 election, Majimbun contested the Sabah State Legislative Assembly seat of Inanam, but was squeezed into third place behind candidates from the two major national coalitions, the Barisan Nasional and Pakatan Rakyat.

== Election results ==
Parliament of Malaysia
Year	Constituency	Candidate	Votes	Pct	Opponent(s)	Votes	Pct	Ballots cast	Majority	Turnout
2004	P171 Sepanggar	Eric Majimbun (SAPP)	16,226	76.09%	Saidatul Badru Mohd Said (PKR)	5,098	23.91%	22,083	11,128	63.96%
2008	P171 Sepanggar	Eric Majimbun (SAPP)	16,884	64.90%	Yembun Abdullah (PKR)	5,423	20.84%	26,990	11,461	68.76%
2008	P171 Sepanggar	Eric Majimbun (SAPP)	16,884	64.90%	Ewol Muji (DAP)	3,709	14.26%	26,990	11,461	68.76%

Sabah State Legislative Assembly
Year	Constituency	Candidate	Votes	Pct	Opponent(s)	Votes	Pct	Ballots cast	Majority	Turnout
2013	N13 Inanam	Eric Majimbun (SAPP)	5,003	25.46%	Roland Chia Ming Shen (PKR)	8,926	45.42%	20,106	3,202	82.39%
2013	N13 Inanam	Eric Majimbun (SAPP)	5,003	25.46%	Joseph Paulus Lantip (PBS)	5,724	29.13%	20,106	3,202	82.39%

== Honours ==
- Malaysia
  - Medal of the Order of the Defender of the Realm (PPN) (1999)
- Sabah
  - Commander of the Order of Kinabalu (PGDK) – Datuk (2007)
