= Abdul Rahman Dahlan =

Malaysian politician

Yang Berbahagia Datuk Seri Panglima Abdul Rahman Dahlan SPDK SMW PGDK DIMP ADK
- عبدالرحمن دحلان
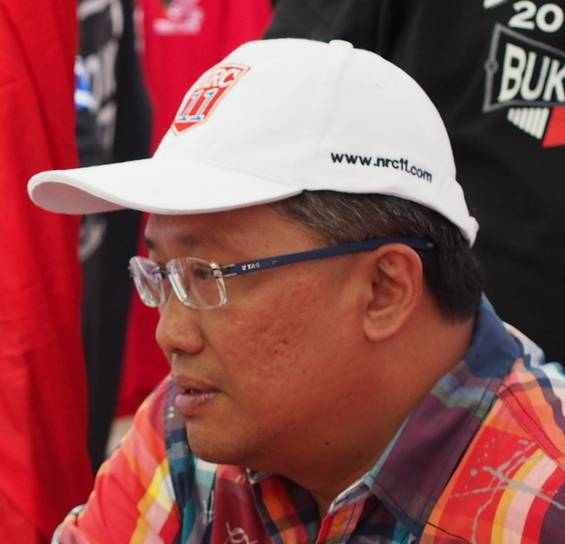
- Abdul Rahman in 2014

Ministerial roles
- 2013–2016: Minister of Urban Wellbeing, Housing and Local Government
- 2016–2018: Minister in the Prime Minister's Department

Faction represented in Dewan Rakyat
- 2008–2018: Barisan Nasional

Other roles
- 2021–: Chair of board of directors of Universiti Malaysia Sabah

Personal details
- Born: Abdul Rahman bin Dahlan; 24 November 1965 (age 60) Sabah, Malaysia
- Party: United Malays National Organisation (UMNO)
- Other political affiliations: Barisan Nasional (BN); Perikatan Nasional (PN); Muafakat Nasional (MN)
- Spouses: Datin Seri Panglima Norazlina binti Tan Sri Awang Had (m. 1999) Datin Seri Vie Shantie Haroon Khan (m. 2019)
- Children: Kencana Putera; Karisma Putera; Kaseh Raina; Vie Raissa
- Education: Sonoma State University
- Occupation: Politician

Abdul Rahman bin Dahlan (Jawi: عبدالرحمن بن دحلان; born 24 November 1965) is a Malaysian politician. He is the former Minister in the Prime Minister's Department and the Minister of Urban Wellbeing, Housing and Local Government. He had served as the Member of Parliament (MP) of Malaysia for the Kota Belud constituency in Sabah from 2008 to 2018. He is a member and Division Chief of Tuaran of the United Malay National Organisation (UMNO) party, a component of Barisan Nasional (BN).

Abdul Rahman was elected to Parliament in the 2008 general election for the UMNO-held seat of Kota Belud, after UMNO dropped its incumbent member Salleh Said Keruak. Before his election he was a party official for UMNO.

On 16 May 2013, after the 2013 general elections he was appointed Minister of Urban Wellbeing, Housing and Local Government under the cabinet of Prime Minister Najib Razak. On 28 June 2016, he was appointed to be the Minister in the Prime Minister's Department in charge of Economic Planning Unit. He was the first Sabahan to hold the EPU position.

In 2018, he was widely acknowledged as the person entrusted by the Prime Minister to secure Saudi Aramco's US$7 billion investment in Malaysia.

In the 2018 general elections, Abdul Rahman had switched to contest the Sepanggar parliamentary seat but had lost to Azis Jamman of Sabah Heritage Party (WARISAN).

Most people attributed his loss in Sepanggar to an incorrect strategy by the party top leadership, knowing that Abdul Rahman was still hugely popular in Kota Belud constituency which he had represented for 10 years. Despite Abdul Rahman's strong objection, the party went ahead with the decision to put him as a candidate in Sepanggar. In the end, the instruction for him to switch to Sepanggar, a new constituency for him, barely 3 months before the parliamentary general election in 2018 was proven flawed and disastrous for the party. UMNO lost both in Sepanggar and Kota Belud parliamentary seats, the latter because of voters’ anger towards UMNO for issuing instruction to Abdul Rahman to contest in Sepanggar.

In January 2021, Abdul Rahman was appointed the Chairman of Board of Directors, Universiti Malaysia Sabah for a period of three years. He pledged to solve the construction delays afflicting the university's teaching hospital and the students housing projects.

== Marriage and children ==
Rahman married former News Anchor NTV7 Norazlina Tan Sri Awang Had in 1999. Together they have three children (two boys, one daughter). He is also married to the former wife of Malaysian actor Eizlan Yusof, Vie Shantie Haroon Khan. Rahman has a daughter with her.

== Election results ==
Parliament of Malaysia
Year	Constituency	Candidate	Votes	Pct	Opponent(s)	Votes	Pct	Ballots cast	Majority	Turnout
2008	P169 Kota Belud	Abdul Rahman Dahlan (UMNO)	17,842	54.62%	Saidil @ Saidi bin Simoi (PKR)	14,822	45.38%	33,710	3,020	78.27%
2013	P169 Kota Belud	Abdul Rahman Dahlan (UMNO)	21,768	51.44%	Isnaraissah Munirah Majilis (PKR)	16,673	39.40%	43,502	5,095	84.52%
2013	P169 Kota Belud	Abdul Rahman Dahlan (UMNO)	21,768	51.44%	Jalumin Bayogoh (STAR)	2,709	6.40%	43,502	5,095	84.52%
2013	P169 Kota Belud	Abdul Rahman Dahlan (UMNO)	21,768	51.44%	Lamsil Amidsor (IND)	979	2.31%	43,502	5,095	84.52%
2013	P169 Kota Belud	Abdul Rahman Dahlan (UMNO)	21,768	51.44%	Kanul Gindol (IND)	185	0.44%	43,502	5,095	84.52%
2018	P171 Sepanggar	Abdul Rahman Dahlan (UMNO)	15,436	32.30%	Azis Jamman (WARISAN)	28,420	59.47%	49,012	12,984	78.53%
2018	P171 Sepanggar	Abdul Rahman Dahlan (UMNO)	15,436	32.30%	Jeffrey Kumin (SAPP)	2,958	6.19%	49,012	12,984	78.53%
2018	P171 Sepanggar	Abdul Rahman Dahlan (UMNO)	15,436	32.30%	Robert Sopining (PCS)	971	2.03	49,012	12,984	78.53%
2022	P169 Kota Belud	Abdul Rahman Dahlan (UMNO)	20,566	38.06%	Isnaraissah Munirah Majilis (WARISAN)	25,148	46.54%	55,272	4,582	67.64%
2022	P169 Kota Belud	Abdul Rahman Dahlan (UMNO)	20,566	38.06%	Madeli @ Modily bin Bangali (PKR)	8,323	15.40%	55,272	4,582	67.64%

== Honours ==
- Pahang
  - Knight Companion of the Order of the Crown of Pahang (DIMP) – Dato' (2005)
- Sabah
  - Member of the Order of Kinabalu (ADK) (2001)
  - Commander of the Order of Kinabalu (PGDK) – Datuk (2013)
  - Grand Commander of the Order of Kinabalu (SPDK) – Datuk Seri Panglima (2017)
- Federal Territory (Malaysia)
  - Grand Commander of the Order of the Territorial Crown (SMW) – Datuk Seri (2017)
