= Usukan =

Malaysian political subdivision

Usukan (N10)
Sabah constituency

State constituency
- Legislature: Sabah State Legislative Assembly
MLA
Isnaraissah Munirah Majilis
Heritage
- Constituency created: 1967
- First contested: 1967
- Last contested: 2025

Demographics
- Electors (2025): 24,235

Usukan is a state constituency in Sabah, Malaysia, that is represented in the Sabah State Legislative Assembly.

== Demographics ==
As of 2020, Usukan has a population of 34,458 people.

Ethnic breakdown of Usukan's electorate as of 2025
1. Muslim Bumiputera (86.0%)
2. Non-Muslim Bumiputera (9.00%)
3. Chinese (5.00%)
4. Other ethnicities (0.00%)

== History ==
=== Polling districts ===
According to the gazette issued on 31 October 2022, the Usukan constituency has a total of 11 polling districts.

| State constituency | Polling Districts | Code | Location |
|---|---|---|---|
| Usukan（N10） | Ambong | 169/10/01 | SK Ambong |
| Usukan（N10） | Kulambai | 169/10/02 | SK Kulambai |
| Usukan（N10） | Timbang Dayang | 169/10/03 | SK Timbang Dayang |
| Usukan（N10） | Sambirai | 169/10/04 | SK Sembirai |
| Usukan（N10） | Pangkalan Abai | 169/10/05 | SK Pangkalan Abai |
| Usukan（N10） | Pompod | 169/10/06 | SJK (C) Chung Hwa |
| Usukan（N10） | Kota Belud | 169/10/07 | SMK Pekan Kota Belud |
| Usukan（N10） | Pirasan | 169/10/08 | SMK Arshad |
| Usukan（N10） | Suang Punggor | 169/10/09 | SK Suang Punggor |
| Usukan（N10） | Kuala Abai | 169/10/10 | SK Kuala Abai |
| Usukan（N10） | Siasai | 169/10/11 | SK St Edmund |

=== Representation history ===
Member of Sabah State Legislative Assembly for Usukan
| Assembly | No | Years | Member | Party |
Constituency created
| 3rd | N05 | 1967 – 1971 | Mohammad Said Keruak | Alliance (USNO) |
| 4th | N05 | 1971 – 1976 | Mohammad Said Keruak | Alliance (USNO) |
| 5th | N07 | 1976 – 1981 | Mohammad Said Keruak | Alliance (USNO) |
| 6th | N07 | 1981 – 1982 | Mohammad Said Keruak | USNO |
| 6th | N07 | 1982 – 1985 | Pandikar Amin Mulia | USNO |
| 7th | N08 | 1985 – 1986 | Mustapha Harun | USNO |
| 8th | N08 | 1986 – 1987 | Abdul Hamid Mustapha | USNO |
| 8th | N08 | 1987 – 1990 | Mustapha Harun | USNO |
| 9th | N08 | 1990 – 1992 | Mustapha Harun | USNO |
| 9th | N08 | 1992 – 1994 | Mustapha Harun | BN (UMNO) |
| 10th | N08 | 1994 – 1999 | Salleh Said Keruak | BN (UMNO) |
| 11th | N08 | 1999 – 2004 | Salleh Said Keruak | BN (UMNO) |
| 12th | N08 | 2004 – 2008 | Japlin Akim | BN (UMNO) |
| 13th | N08 | 2008 – 2013 | Japlin Akim | BN (UMNO) |
| 14th | N08 | 2013 – 2018 | Salleh Said Keruak | BN (UMNO) |
| 15th | N08 | 2018 | Japlin Akim | BN (UMNO) |
| 15th | N08 | 2018 - 2019 | Japlin Akim | Independent |
| 15th | N08 | 2019 – 2020 | Japlin Akim | PH (BERSATU) |
| 15th | N08 | 2020 | Japlin Akim | PN (BERSATU) |
| 16th | N10 | 2020 – 2025 | Salleh Said Keruak | BN (UMNO) |
| 17th | N10 | 2025–present | Isnaraissah Munirah Majilis | WARISAN |

== Election results ==
Sabah state election, 2025: Usukan
| Party | Candidate | Votes | % | ∆% |
|---|---|---|---|---|
| Heritage | Isnaraissah Munirah Majilis | 6,292 | 35.65 | ▲4.90 |
| BN | Salleh Said Keruak | 5,850 | 33.15 | ▼30.78 |
| GRS | Japlin Akim | 5,179 | 29.34 | ▲29.34 |
| Homeland Solidarity Party | Mohd Lin Harun | 179 | 1.01 | ▲1.01 |
| Sabah Dream Party | Jefris Muadis | 97 | 0.55 | ▲0.55 |
| Independent | Ajun Meliyon | 52 | 0.29 | ▲0.29 |
| Total valid votes | | 17,649 | 100.00 | |
| Total rejected ballots | | 217 | | |
| Unreturned ballots | | 39 | | |
| Turnout | | 17,905 | 73.88 | ▼2.83 |
| Registered electors | | 24,235 | | |
| Majority | | 442 | 2.50 | ▼30.68 |
| Heritage gain from BN | | Swing | | - |
Source(s) "RESULTS OF CONTESTED ELECTION AND STATEMENTS OF THE POLL AFTER THE OFFICIAL ADDITION OF VOTES" (PDF).

Sabah state election, 2020: Usukan
| Party | Candidate | Votes | % | ∆% |
|---|---|---|---|---|
| BN | Salleh Said Keruak | 8,280 | 63.93 | ▲12.94 |
| Sabah Heritage Party | Abdul Bahkrin Mohd Yusof | 3,982 | 30.75 | ▼13.09 |
| Love Sabah Party | Mohd Nazaruddin Tiga Belas | 421 | 3.25 | ▲3.25 |
| Total valid votes | | 12,683 | 97.93 | |
| Total rejected ballots | | 212 | 1.64 | |
| Unreturned ballots | | 56 | 0.43 | |
| Turnout | | 12,951 | 76.71 | ▼5.65 |
| Registered electors | | 16,883 | | |
| Majority | | 4,298 | 33.18 | ▲26.03 |
| BN hold | | Swing | | |
Source(s) "RESULTS OF CONTESTED ELECTION AND STATEMENTS OF THE POLL AFTER THE OFFICIAL ADDITION OF VOTES".

Sabah state election, 2018: Usukan
| Party | Candidate | Votes | % | ∆% |
|---|---|---|---|---|
| BN | Japlin Akim | 8,738 | 50.99 | ▲18.59 |
| Sabah Heritage Party | Abdul Bahkrin Mohd Yusof | 7,513 | 43.84 | ▲43.84 |
| PAS | Adzmin Awang | 355 | 2.07 | ▲2.07 |
| Independent | Amsor Tuah | 70 | 0.41 | ▲0.41 |
| Total valid votes | | 16,676 | 97.30 | |
| Total rejected ballots | | 356 | 2.08 | |
| Unreturned ballots | | 106 | 0.62 | |
| Turnout | | 17,138 | 82.36 | ▼1.24 |
| Registered electors | | 20,808 | | |
| Majority | | 1,225 | 7.15 | ▼36.42 |
| BN hold | | Swing | | |
Source(s) "RESULTS OF CONTESTED ELECTION AND STATEMENTS OF THE POLL AFTER THE OFFICIAL ADDITION OF VOTES".

Sabah state election, 2013: Usukan
| Party | Candidate | Votes | % | ∆% |
|---|---|---|---|---|
| BN | Salleh Said Keruak | 10,879 | 69.58 | ▲4.64 |
| PKR | Mustapha @ Mohd Yunus Sakmud | 4,067 | 26.01 | ▼6.13 |
| STAR | Bakhruddin Ismail | 285 | 1.82 | ▲1.82 |
| Total valid votes | | 15,213 | 97.42 | |
| Total rejected ballots | | 372 | 2.38 | |
| Unreturned ballots | | 32 | 0.20 | |
| Turnout | | 15,635 | 83.60 | ▲6.06 |
| Registered electors | | 18,698 | | |
| Majority | | 6,812 | 43.57 | ▲10.77 |
| BN hold | | Swing | | |
Source(s) "KEPUTUSAN PILIHAN RAYA UMUM DEWAN UNDANGAN NEGERI".

Sabah state election, 2008: Usukan
| Party | Candidate | Votes | % | ∆% |
|---|---|---|---|---|
| BN | Japlin Akim | 7,964 | 64.94 | ▲10.94 |
| PKR | Mohd Shukor Abdul Mumin | 3,941 | 32.14 | ▲32.14 |
| Total valid votes | | 11,905 | 97.08 | |
| Total rejected ballots | | 336 | 2.74 | |
| Unreturned ballots | | 22 | 0.18 | |
| Turnout | | 12,263 | 77.54 | ▲3.55 |
| Registered electors | | 15,816 | | |
| Majority | | 4,023 | 32.80 | ▲17.06 |
| BN hold | | Swing | | |
Source(s) "KEPUTUSAN PILIHAN RAYA UMUM DEWAN UNDANGAN NEGERI SABAH BAGI TAHUN 2008".

Sabah state election, 2004: Usukan
| Party | Candidate | Votes | % | ∆% |
|---|---|---|---|---|
| BN | Japlin Akim | 5,950 | 54.00 | ▼7.17 |
| Independent | Saijan Samit | 4,215 | 38.26 | ▲38.26 |
| PAS | Nordin Aloh | 413 | 3.75 | ▲3.75 |
| BERSEKUTU | Ibrahim Linggam | 122 | 1.11 | ▼6.56 |
| Total valid votes | | 10,700 | 97.11 | |
| Total rejected ballots | | 307 | 2.79 | |
| Unreturned ballots | | 11 | 0.10 | |
| Turnout | | 11,018 | 73.99 | ▼6.22 |
| Registered electors | | 14,891 | | |
| Majority | | 1,735 | 15.74 | ▼15.37 |
| BN hold | | Swing | | |
Source(s) "KEPUTUSAN PILIHAN RAYA UMUM DEWAN UNDANGAN NEGERI SABAH BAGI TAHUN 2004".

Sabah state election, 1999: Usukan
| Party | Candidate | Votes | % | ∆% |
|---|---|---|---|---|
| BN | Salleh Said Keruak | 7,127 | 61.17 | ▲0.12 |
| PBS | Saidil @ Saidi Simoy | 3,503 | 30.06 | ▼4.88 |
| BERSEKUTU | Mudry Nasir | 894 | 7.67 | ▲7.67 |
| Total valid votes | | 11,524 | 98.90 | |
| Total rejected ballots | | 128 | 1.10 | |
| Unreturned ballots | | 0 | 0.00 | |
| Turnout | | 11,652 | 80.21 | ▼2.32 |
| Registered electors | | 14,526 | | |
| Majority | | 3,624 | 31.11 | ▲5.00 |
| BN hold | | Swing | | |
Source(s) "KEPUTUSAN PILIHAN RAYA UMUM DEWAN UNDANGAN NEGERI SABAH BAGI TAHUN 1999".

Sabah state election, 1994: Usukan
| Party | Candidate | Votes | % | ∆% |
|---|---|---|---|---|
| BN | Salleh Said Keruak | 6,274 | 61.05 | ▲61.05 |
| PBS | Badaruddin Mustapha | 3,591 | 34.94 | ▲9.44 |
| SETIA | Semat Abdul Karim | 159 | 1.55 | ▲1.55 |
| Independent | Salisi Ukoh | 150 | 1.46 | ▲1.46 |
| Total valid votes | | 10,174 | 99.00 | |
| Total rejected ballots | | 103 | 1.00 | |
| Unreturned ballots | | 0 | 0.00 | |
| Turnout | | 10,277 | 82.53 | ▲3.88 |
| Registered electors | | 12,452 | | |
| Majority | | 2,683 | 26.11 | ▼5.44 |
| BN gain from USNO | | Swing | | ? |
Source(s) "KEPUTUSAN PILIHAN RAYA UMUM DEWAN UNDANGAN NEGERI SABAH BAGI TAHUN 1994".

Sabah state election, 1990: Usukan
| Party | Candidate | Votes | % | ∆% |
|---|---|---|---|---|
| USNO | Mustapha Harun | 4,805 | 57.05 | ▲0.61 |
| PBS | Pinjaman Hassin | 2,148 | 25.50 | ▼7.23 |
| BERJAYA | Raskan Asing | 583 | 6.92 | ▲6.92 |
| AKAR | Melin Laut | 407 | 4.83 | ▲4.83 |
| PRS | Pinjaman Hassin | 208 | 2.47 | ▲2.47 |
| Independent | Ching Ing Hing | 106 | 1.26 | ▼2.42 |
| Independent | Jamrah Kantoh | 75 | 0.89 | ▲0.89 |
| Total valid votes | | 8,332 | 98.92 | |
| Total rejected ballots | | 91 | 1.08 | |
| Unreturned ballots | | 0 | 0.00 | |
| Turnout | | 8,423 | 78.65 | ▲0.03 |
| Registered electors | | 10,710 | | |
| Majority | | 2,657 | 31.55 | ▲7.84 |
| USNO hold | | Swing | | |
Source(s) "KEPUTUSAN PILIHAN RAYA UMUM DEWAN UNDANGAN NEGERI SABAH BAGI TAHUN 1990".

Sabah state election, 1986: Usukan
| Party | Candidate | Votes | % | ∆% |
|---|---|---|---|---|
| USNO | Abdul Hamid Mustapha | 4,249 | 56.93 | ▲6.57 |
| PBS | Pinjaman Hassin | 2,464 | 33.02 | ▲22.79 |
| Independent | Liew Vui Kong | 473 | 6.34 | ▲6.34 |
| Independent | Ching Ing Hing | 277 | 3.71 | ▲3.71 |
| Total valid votes | | 7,463 | 100.00 | |
| Total rejected ballots | | 65 | | |
| Unreturned ballots | | 0 | | |
| Turnout | | 7,528 | 78.62 | ▼3.69 |
| Registered electors | | 9,575 | | |
| Majority | | 1,785 | 23.92 | ▲8.33 |
| USNO hold | | Swing | | |
Source(s) "KEPUTUSAN PILIHAN RAYA UMUM DEWAN UNDANGAN NEGERI SABAH BAGI TAHUN 1986".

Sabah state election, 1985: Usukan
| Party | Candidate | Votes | % | ∆% |
|---|---|---|---|---|
| USNO | Mustapha Harun | 3,747 | 50.36 | ▲7.06 |
| BERJAYA | Md Salleh Md Said | 2,587 | 34.77 | ▼4.57 |
| PBS | Dupalan Sakandar | 761 | 10.23 | ▲10.23 |
| BERSIH | Abdul Mumin Mulia | 326 | 4.38 | ▲4.38 |
| BERSEPADU | Semat Abdul Karim | 19 | 0.26 | ▲0.26 |
| Total valid votes | | 7,440 | 100.00 | |
| Total rejected ballots | | 66 | | |
| Unreturned ballots | | 0 | | |
| Turnout | | 7,506 | 82.31 | ▲3.11 |
| Registered electors | | 9,119 | | |
| Majority | | 1,160 | 15.59 | ▲11.63 |
| USNO hold | | Swing | | |

Sabah state by-election, 1 October 1982: Usukan Sought re-election upon change of party allegiance of the incumbent, Mohammad Said Keruak
| Party | Candidate | Votes | % | ∆% |
|---|---|---|---|---|
| USNO | Pandikar Amin Mulia | 2,877 | 43.30 | ▼7.41 |
| BERJAYA | Md Salleh Md Said | 2,614 | 39.34 | ▼9.95 |
| Independent | Ajun Meliyon | 565 | 8.50 | ▲8.50 |
| Independent | Maggit Julan | 280 | 4.21 | ▲4.21 |
| Independent | Mardin Abdul Ghani | 156 | 2.35 | ▲2.35 |
| Independent | Ginduk Sani | 153 | 2.30 | ▲2.30 |
| Total valid votes | | 6,645 | 100.00 | |
| Total rejected ballots | | 108 | | |
| Unreturned ballots | | 0 | | |
| Turnout | | 6,753 | 79.20 | ▼6.87 |
| Registered electors | | 8,527 | | |
| Majority | | 263 | 3.96 | ▲2.53 |
| USNO hold | | Swing | | - |

Sabah state election, 1981: Usukan
| Party | Candidate | Votes | % | ∆% |
|---|---|---|---|---|
| USNO | Mohammad Said Keruak | 3,160 | 50.71 | ▼17.08 |
| BERJAYA | Mohammad Yahya Lampong | 3,071 | 49.29 | ▲30.41 |
| Total valid votes | | 6,231 | 100.00 | |
| Total rejected ballots | | 169 | | |
| Unreturned ballots | | 0 | | |
| Turnout | | 6,400 | 86.07 | ▼2.24 |
| Registered electors | | 7,436 | | |
| Majority | | 89 | 1.43 | ▼47.48 |
| USNO gain from Alliance | | Swing | | - |

Sabah state election, 1976: Usukan
| Party | Candidate | Votes | % | ∆% |
|---|---|---|---|---|
| USNO | Mohammad Said Keruak | 3,451 | 67.79 | |
| BERJAYA | Mohd. Yakin Abd. Mumin | 961 | 18.88 | |
| PEKEMAS | Sharif Kuaris | 679 | 13.34 | |
| Total valid votes | | 5,091 | 100.00 | |
| Total rejected ballots | | 144 | | |
| Unreturned ballots | | 0 | | |
| Turnout | | 5,235 | 88.31 | |
| Registered electors | | 5,928 | | |
| Majority | | 2,490 | 48.91 | |
| USNO hold | | Swing | | |

Sabah state election, 1971: Usukan
| Party | Candidate | Votes | % | ∆% |
|---|---|---|---|---|
On the nomination day, Mohammad Said Keruak won uncontested.
| USNO | Mohammad Said Keruak | | | |
| Total valid votes | | | | |
| Total rejected ballots | | | | |
| Unreturned ballots | | | | |
| Turnout | | | | |
| Registered electors | | 0 | | |
| Majority | | | | |
| Alliance hold | | Swing | | |

Sabah state election, 1967: Usukan
| Party | Candidate | Votes | % |
|---|---|---|---|
On the nomination day, Mohammad Said Keruak won uncontested.
| USNO | Mohammad Said Keruak | | |
| Total valid votes | | | |
| Total rejected ballots | | | |
| Unreturned ballots | | | |
| Turnout | | | |
| Registered electors | | 6,070 | |
| Majority | | | |
This was a new constituency created
