= Azis Jamman =

Malaysian politician

Yang Berbahagia Datuk Mohd Azis Jamman PGDK DIMP
- محمد عزيز بن زمان

Deputy Minister of Home Affairs
- In office 2 July 2018 – 24 February 2020
- Monarchs: Muhammad V Abdullah
- Prime Minister: Mahathir Mohamad
- Minister: Muhyiddin Yassin
- Preceded by: Nur Jazlan Mohamed (Deputy Minister of Home Affairs I); Masir Kujat (Deputy Minister of Home Affairs II)
- Succeeded by: Ismail Mohamed Said (Deputy Minister of Home Affairs I); Jonathan Yasin (Deputy Minister of Home Affairs II)
- Constituency: Sepanggar

Member of the Malaysian Parliament for Sepanggar
- In office 9 May 2018 – 10 October 2022
- Preceded by: Jumat Idris (BN–UMNO)
- Succeeded by: Mustapha Sakmud (PH–PKR)
- Majority: 12,984 (2018)

Information Chief of the Heritage Party
- Incumbent
- Assumed office 13 October 2022
- President: Shafie Apdal
- Preceded by: Awang Ahmad Sah Awang Sahari

1st Youth Chief of the Heritage Party
- In office 17 October 2016 – 28 August 2022
- President: Shafie Apdal
- Preceded by: Position established
- Succeeded by: Ismail Ayob

Personal details
- Born: Mohd Azis bin Jamman; 3 November 1974 (age 51) Semporna, Sabah, Malaysia
- Citizenship: Malaysian
- Party: United Malays National Organisation (UMNO) (–2016); Heritage Party (WARISAN) (since 2016)
- Other political affiliations: Barisan Nasional (BN) (–2016)
- Occupation: Politician

Mohd Azis bin Jamman (Jawi: محمد عزيز بن زمان) is a Malaysian politician who served as the Deputy Minister of Home Affairs in the Pakatan Harapan (PH) administration under former Prime Minister Mahathir Mohamad and former Minister Muhyiddin Yassin from July 2018 to the collapse of the PH administration in February 2020 and the Member of Parliament (MP) for Sepanggar from May 2018 to November 2022. He has served as the Information Chief of WARISAN since October 2022 and the 1st and founding Youth Chief of WARISAN from October 2016 to August 2022.

== Elections ==
=== 2018 general election ===
In the 2018 election, his party, the then Sabah Heritage Party (WARISAN) fielded him to contest the Sepanggar parliamentary seat which was expected to be a marginal seat against Abdul Rahman Dahlan, the incumbent Minister in the Prime Minister's Department from the United Malays National Organisation (UMNO) and subsequently won.

=== Election results ===
Parliament of Malaysia
Year	Constituency	Candidate	Votes	Pct	Opponent(s)	Votes	Pct	Ballots cast	Majority	Turnout
2018	P171 Sepanggar	Azis Jamman (WARISAN)	28,420	59.47%	Abdul Rahman Dahlan (UMNO)	15,436	32.30%	47,785	12,984	78.53%
2018	P171 Sepanggar	Azis Jamman (WARISAN)	28,420	59.47%	Jeffrey Kumin (SAPP)	2,958	6.19%	47,785	12,984	78.53%
2018	P171 Sepanggar	Azis Jamman (WARISAN)	28,420	59.47%	Robert Sopining (PCS)	2,958	6.19%	47,785	12,984	78.53%
2022	P171 Sepanggar	Azis Jamman (WARISAN)	18,594	26.45%	Mustapha Sakmud (PKR)	27,022	38.44%	70,304	7,042	64.87%
2022	P171 Sepanggar	Azis Jamman (WARISAN)	18,594	26.45%	Yakubah Khan (UMNO)	19,980	28.42%	70,304	7,042	64.87%
2022	P171 Sepanggar	Azis Jamman (WARISAN)	18,594	26.45%	Jumardie Lukman (KDM)	3,977	5.66%	70,304	7,042	64.87%
2022	P171 Sepanggar	Azis Jamman (WARISAN)	18,594	26.45%	Yusof Kunchang (PEJUANG)	731	1.04%	70,304	7,042	64.87%

== Honours ==
- Pahang
  - Knight Companion of the Order of the Crown of Pahang (DIMP) – Dato' (2015)
- Sabah
  - Commander of the Order of Kinabalu (PGDK) – Datuk (2018)
