= Bakri (federal constituency) =

Federal constituency in Johor, Malaysia

Bakri (P145)
Johor constituency

Federal constituency
- Legislature: Dewan Rakyat
- MP: Tan Hong Pin; PH
- Constituency created: 1984
- First contested: 1986
- Last contested: 2022

Demographics
- Population (2020): 135,179
- Electors (2026): 99,182
- Area (km²): 191
- Pop. density (per km²): 707.7

Bakri is a federal constituency in Muar District, Johor, Malaysia, that has been represented in the Dewan Rakyat since 1986.

The federal constituency was created in the 1984 redistribution and is mandated to return a single member to the Dewan Rakyat under the first past the post voting system.

== Demographics ==
Ethnic breakdown of Bakri's electorate as of 2026
1. Chinese (51.0%)
2. Malay (46.0%)
3. Indian (2.10%)
4. Other ethnicities (0.90%)

As of 2020, Bakri has a population of 135,179 people.

Age breakdown of Bakri's electorate as of 2022
1. 18-20 (5.31%)
2. 21-29 (19.4%)
3. 30-39 (20.8%)
4. 40-49 (17.4%)
5. 50-59 (15.1%)
6. 60-69 (12.5%)
7. 70-79 (6.54%)
8. 80-89 (2.50%)
9. above 90 (0.46%)
Gender breakdown of Bakri's electorate as of 2022
1. Male (49.4%)
2. Female (50.6%)

== History ==
=== Polling districts ===
According to the federal gazette issued on 2 July 2026, the Bakri constituency has a total of 34 polling districts.

State constituency	Polling Districts	Code	Location
Bentayan (N12)	Jalan Ismail	145/12/01	SMK Bandar Maharani
Bentayan (N12)	Parit Beting	145/12/02	SMK Tun Perak
Bentayan (N12)	Sabak Awor	145/12/03	SJK (C) Sing Hwa
Bentayan (N12)	Parit Tiram	145/12/04	SMK St. Andrew
Bentayan (N12)	Bentayan	145/12/05	SA Rendah (Arab) As Saadiah
Bentayan (N12)	Pasar	145/12/06	SJK (C) Chung Hwa Presbyterian
Bentayan (N12)	Bandar Timor	145/12/07	SJK (C) Chung Hwa 2A
Bentayan (N12)	Jalan Daud Timor	145/12/08	SMK Convent
Bentayan (N12)	Jalan Daud Barat	145/12/09	SK Bandar Maharani
Bentayan (N12)	Taman Orkid	145/12/10	SJK (C) Pei Yang
Bentayan (N12)	Sungai Abong Tengah	145/12/11	SK Parit Setongkat
Bentayan (N12)	Sungai Abong Baru	145/12/12	SA Bersepadu Sungai Abong
Bentayan (N12)	Bandar Barat	145/12/13	SJK (C) Chung Hwa 1A
Simpang Jeram (N13)	Jalan Sakeh	145/13/01	SA Tun Dr. Ismail; Dewan Kg. Kenangan Tun Dr. Ismail 2
Simpang Jeram (N13)	Temenggong Ahmad Dalam	145/13/02	SK Parit Keroma Darat
Simpang Jeram (N13)	Sungai Abong	145/13/03	SMK Sungai Abong
Simpang Jeram (N13)	Jalan Haji Abdullah	145/13/04	SK Bakri Batu 2
Simpang Jeram (N13)	Haji Abdullah Selatan	145/13/05	SA Parit Keroma Darat
Simpang Jeram (N13)	Jeram Tengah	145/13/06	SA Seri Bukit Batu
Simpang Jeram (N13)	Bukit Batu	145/13/07	SK Seri Bukit Batu
Simpang Jeram (N13)	Kampong Ulu	145/13/08	SA Bakri Batu Enam
Simpang Jeram (N13)	Simpang Jeram	145/13/09	SK Simpang Jeram; SJK (C) Pei Chai
Simpang Jeram (N13)	Sri Tanjong	145/13/10	SK Bakri Batu 5
Simpang Jeram (N13)	Kampong Sungai Abong	145/13/11	Kolej Vokasional Muar; SK Sungai Abong
Bukit Naning (N14)	Pekan Bukit Bakri Timor	145/14/01	SJK (C) Pu Nan
Bukit Naning (N14)	Pekan Bukit Bakri Barat	145/14/02	SMK Tun Dr. Ismail (STUDI); MRSM Muar
Bukit Naning (N14)	Bakri	145/14/03	SJK (C) Chin Terh
Bukit Naning (N14)	Parit Zain	145/14/04	SK Parit Zain
Bukit Naning (N14)	Ayer Manis	145/14/05	SJK (C) Chin Terh
Bukit Naning (N14)	Bukit Naning	145/14/06	SK Bukit Naning
Bukit Naning (N14)	Ayer Hitam	145/14/07	SK Ayer Hitam Batu 18
Bukit Naning (N14)	Kampong Parit Tengah	145/14/08	SA Ayer Hitam Batu 18
Bukit Naning (N14)	Parit No 5	145/14/09	SK Parit No. 5
Bukit Naning (N14)	Parit No 3	145/14/10	SA Parit No 5

=== Representation history ===
Members of Parliament for Bakri
Parliament	No	Years	Member	Party	Vote Share
Constituency created from Muar, Pagoh and Semerah
7th	P122	1986–1990	Chua Jui Meng (蔡瑞明)	BN (MCA)	14,818; 49.45%
8th	P122	1990–1995	Chua Jui Meng (蔡瑞明)	BN (MCA)	18,730; 54.53%
9th	P132	1995–1999	Chua Jui Meng (蔡瑞明)	BN (MCA)	22,162; 62.35%
10th	P132	1999–2004	Chua Jui Meng (蔡瑞明)	BN (MCA)	25,676; 67.58%
11th	P145	2004–2008	Chua Jui Meng (蔡瑞明)	BN (MCA)	29,320; 74.08%
12th	P145	2008–2013	Er Teck Hwa (余德华)	PR (DAP)	21,051; 50.87%
13th	P145	2013–2015	Er Teck Hwa (余德华)	PR (DAP)	31,118; 54.43%
13th	P145	2015–2018	Er Teck Hwa (余德华)	PH (DAP)	31,118; 54.43%
14th	P145	2018–2022	Yeo Bee Yin (杨美盈)	PH (DAP)	38,718; 62.65%
15th	P145	2022–present	Tan Hong Pin (陈泓宾)	PH (DAP)	36,636; 50.09%

=== State constituency ===
Parliamentary constituency	State constituency						
Parliamentary constituency	1954–59*	1959–1974	1974–1986	1986–1995	1995–2004	2004–2018	2018–present
Bakri						Bentayan	
Bakri				Bukit Naning			
Bakri				Maharani			
Bakri							Simpang Jeram
Bakri						Sungai Abong	

=== Historical boundaries ===
State Constituency	Area			
State Constituency	1984	1994	2003	2018
Bentayan			Jalan Tunku Bendahara; Parit Beting; Sabak Awor; Taman Bakariah Indah; Taman Marin	Bentayan; Parit Beting; Sabak Awor; Taman Bakariah Indah; Taman Marin
Bukit Naning	Ayer Manis; Bakri; Bukit Naning; Parit Tengah; Simpang Jeram		Ayer Manis; Bakri; Bukit Naning; Parit Tengah; Parit Zain	
Maharani	Bentayan; Muar; Maharani; Sabak Awor; Taman Marin			
Simpang Jeram				Kampong Sakeh; Simpang Jeram; Sungai Abong; Taman Desa; Taman Pertama Indah
Sungai Abong			Kampong Sakeh; Simpang Jeram; Taman Desa; Taman Marin; Taman Pertama Indah	

=== Current state assembly members ===
No.	State Constituency	Member	Coalition (Party)
N12	Bentayan	Ng Yak Howe	PH (DAP)
N13	Simpang Jeram	Nazri Abdul Rahman	PH (AMANAH)
N14	Bukit Naning	Mohd Sabari Ghazali	BN (UMNO)

=== Local governments & postcodes ===
No.	State Constituency	Local Government	Postcode
N12	Bentayan	Muar Municipal Council	84000 Muar; 84100 Kampung Kenangan Tun Dr Ismail; 84200 Bakri
N13	Simpang Jeram	Muar Municipal Council	84000 Muar; 84100 Kampung Kenangan Tun Dr Ismail; 84200 Bakri
N14	Bukit Naning	Muar Municipal Council	84000 Muar; 84100 Kampung Kenangan Tun Dr Ismail; 84200 Bakri

== Election results ==
Malaysian general election, 2022
Party	Candidate	Votes	%	∆%
PH	Tan Hong Pin	36,636	50.09	▲50.09
BN	Lee Ching Yong	17,382	23.77	▼1.32
PN	Chelvarajan Suppiah	17,222	23.55	▲23.55
Independent	Haron Jaffar	1,900	2.60	▲2.60
Total valid votes		73,140	100.00	
Total rejected ballots		742		
Unreturned ballots		239		
Turnout		74,121	75.14	▼9.63
Registered electors		97,335		
Majority		19,254	26.32	▼11.24
PH hold		Swing		
Source(s) https://lom.agc.gov.my/ilims/upload/portal/akta/outputp/1753254/PUB%20617%20PARLIMEN%20JOHOR.pdf

Malaysian general election, 2018
Party	Candidate	Votes	%	∆%
PKR	Yeo Bee Yin	38,718	62.65	▲62.65
BN	Koh Chon Chai	15,507	25.09	▼20.48
PAS	Zarul @ Mohammad Zahrul Salleh	7,575	12.26	▲12.26
Total valid votes		61,800	100.00	
Total rejected ballots		631		
Unreturned ballots		201		
Turnout		62,632	84.77	▼2.21
Registered electors		73,883		
Majority		23,211	37.56	▲28.70
PKR hold		Swing		
Source(s) "His Majesty's Government Gazette - Notice of Contested Election, Parliament for the State of Johore [P.U. (B) 244/2018]" (PDF). Attorney General's Chambers of Malaysia. 3 May 2018. Archived from the original (PDF) on 29 December 2019. "Federal Government Gazette - Results of Contested Election and Statements of the Poll after the Official Addition of Votes, Parliamentary Constituencies for the State of Johore [P.U. (B) 318/2018]" (PDF). Attorney General's Chambers of Malaysia. 28 May 2018.

Malaysian general election, 2013
Party	Candidate	Votes	%	∆%
DAP	Er Teck Hwa	31,118	54.43	▲3.56
BN	Lee Ching Yong	26,051	45.57	▼3.56
Total valid votes		57,169	100.00	
Total rejected ballots		1,101		
Unreturned ballots		183		
Turnout		58,453	86.98	▲10.43
Registered electors		67,202		
Majority		5,067	8.86	▲7.12
DAP hold		Swing		
Source(s) "Federal Government Gazette - Notice of Contested Election, Parliament for the State of Johore [P.U. (B) 181/2013]" (PDF). Attorney General's Chambers of Malaysia. 26 April 2013. "Federal Government Gazette - Results of Contested Election and Statements of the Poll after the Official Addition of Votes, Parliamentary Constituencies for the State of Johore [P.U. (B) 222/2013]" (PDF). Attorney General's Chambers of Malaysia. 22 May 2013.

Malaysian general election, 2008
Party	Candidate	Votes	%	∆%
DAP	Er Teck Hwa	21,051	50.87	▲24.95
BN	Tay Puay Chuan	20,329	49.13	▼24.95
Total valid votes		41,380	100.00	
Total rejected ballots		1,561		
Unreturned ballots		227		
Turnout		43,168	76.55	▲2.70
Registered electors		56,372		
Majority		722	1.74	▼46.42
DAP gain from BN		Swing		?

Malaysian general election, 2004
Party	Candidate	Votes	%	∆%
BN	Chua Jui Meng	29,320	74.08	▲6.50
DAP	Azhari Ismail	10,261	25.92	▼6.50
Total valid votes		39,581	100.00	
Total rejected ballots		1,177		
Unreturned ballots		181		
Turnout		40,939	73.85	▼0.30
Registered electors		55,438		
Majority		19,059	48.16	▲13.00
BN hold		Swing		

Malaysian general election, 1999
Party	Candidate	Votes	%	∆%
BN	Chua Jui Meng	25,676	67.58	▲5.23
DAP	Lim Sey Wee	12,316	32.42	▲4.73
Total valid votes		37,992	100.00	
Total rejected ballots		1,375		
Unreturned ballots		119		
Turnout		39,486	74.15	▲0.44
Registered electors		53,251		
Majority		13,360	35.16	▲0.50
BN hold		Swing		

Malaysian general election, 1995
Party	Candidate	Votes	%	∆%
BN	Chua Jui Meng	22,162	62.35	▲7.82
DAP	Tan Kok Kwang	9,844	27.69	▼17.78
PAS	Mohd Huridin Samuri	3,541	9.96	▲9.96
Total valid votes		35,547	100.00	
Total rejected ballots		1,076		
Unreturned ballots		219		
Turnout		36,842	73.71	▼1.23
Registered electors		49,982		
Majority		12,318	34.66	▲25.60
BN hold		Swing		

Malaysian general election, 1990
Party	Candidate	Votes	%	∆%
BN	Chua Jui Meng	18,730	54.53	▲5.08
DAP	Lee Ban Chen	15,619	45.47	▼0.29
Total valid votes		34,349	100.00	
Total rejected ballots		1,207		
Unreturned ballots		0		
Turnout		35,556	74.94	▲3.62
Registered electors		47,443		
Majority		3,111	9.06	▲5.37
BN hold		Swing		

Malaysian general election, 1986
Party	Candidate	Votes	%
BN	Chua Jui Meng	14,818	49.45
DAP	Song Sing Kwee	13,713	45.76
PAS	Hassan Hussein	1,437	4.80
Total valid votes		29,968	100.00
Total rejected ballots		761	
Unreturned ballots		0	
Turnout		30,729	71.32
Registered electors		43,085	
Majority		1,105	3.69
This was a new constituency created.
