= Sepanggar (federal constituency) =

Federal constituency of Sabah, Malaysia

Sepanggar (P171)
Sabah constituency

Federal constituency
- Legislature: Dewan Rakyat
- MP: Mustapha Sakmud; PH
- Constituency created: 2003
- First contested: 2004
- Last contested: 2022

Demographics
- Population (2020): 336,253
- Electors (2025): 117,788
- Area (km²): 317
- Pop. density (per km²): 1,060.7

Sepanggar is a federal constituency in West Coast Division (Kota Kinabalu District), Sabah, Malaysia, that has been represented in the Dewan Rakyat since 2004.

The federal constituency was created in the 2003 redistribution and is mandated to return a single member to the Dewan Rakyat under the first past the post voting system.

== Demographics ==
Ethnic breakdown of Sepanggar's electorate as of 2022
1. Sabah Bumiputera (45.8%)
2. Malay-Muslim Bumiputera (28.3%)
3. Chinese (21.6%)
4. Other ethnicities (4.10%)

As of 2020, Sepanggar has a population of 336,253 people.

Age breakdown of Sepanggar's electorate as of 2022
1. 18-20 (8.83%)
2. 21-29 (27.3%)
3. 30-39 (25.3%)
4. 40-49 (15.6%)
5. 50-59 (11.2%)
6. 60-69 (7.80%)
7. 70-79 (2.54%)
8. 80-89 (0.93%)
9. above 90 (0.57%)
Gender breakdown of Sepanggar's electorate as of 2022
1. Male (51.0%)
2. Female (49.0%)

== History ==
=== Polling districts ===
According to the gazette issued on 21 November 2025, the Sepanggar constituency has a total of 26 polling districts.

State constituency	Polling District	Code	Location
Karambunai (N16)	Karambunai	171/16/01	SK Pangiran Siti Hafsah Karambunai; SK Gantisan
Karambunai (N16)	Gudon	171/16/02	SMK Bandaraya Manggatal Kota Kinabalu
Karambunai (N16)	Taman Indah Permai	171/16/03	Institut Latihan Perindustrian Kota Kinabalu; Institut Penyelidikan dan Kemajuan Pertanian Malaysia (MARDI); SK Unggun Menggatal
Karambunai (N16)	Kibagu	171/16/04	Dewan Serbaguna Kompleks Pentadbiran Kerajaan Persekutuan Sabah
Karambunai (N16)	Telipok Laut	171/16/05	SK Malawa
Karambunai (N16)	Telipok Darat	171/16/06	SMK Pekan Telipok
Karambunai (N16)	Pulau Sepanggar	171/16/07	SK Pulau Sepanggar
Darau (N17)	Likas Baru	171/17/01	Dewan Serbaguna DBKK Likas; Dewan Amil Jaya, DBP Cawangan Sabah
Darau (N17)	Likas Darat	171/17/02	SA Negeri Kampung Likas Kota Kinabalu
Darau (N17)	Kampong Likas	171/17/03	SK Likas
Darau (N17)	Bangka-Bangka	171/17/04	SRS Datuk Simon Fung
Darau (N17)	Kurol Melangi	171/17/05	SMK All Saints
Darau (N17)	Darau	171/17/06	SK Darau
Darau (N17)	Warisan	171/17/07	SMK Inanam
Darau (N17)	Rampayan	171/17/08	Institut Sinaran Kota Kinabalu
Inanam (N18)	Inanam Laut	171/18/01	SK Lok Yuk Inanam; SK Inanam Laut
Inanam (N18)	Tebobon	171/18/02	SK Tebobon; SMK Tebobon
Inanam (N18)	Kokol	171/18/03	SK Kokol
Inanam (N18)	Menggatal	171/18/04	SJK (C) Good Shepherd Menggatal; Dewan Masyarakat Menggatal
Inanam (N18)	Pulutan	171/18/05	SJK (C) Lok Yuk Menggatal
Inanam (N18)	Inanam Darat	171/18/06	SK Kionsom Inanam; SK Pomotodon
Inanam (N18)	Poring-Poring	171/18/07	SK Poring-Poring; SK Ruminding
Inanam (N18)	Kolam Ayer	171/18/08	SK St Catherine
Inanam (N18)	Cenderakasih	171/18/09	SK Mutiara Kota Kinabalu; SMA Kota Kinabalu
Inanam (N18)	Pekan Inanam	171/18/10	SK Kolombong Kota Kinabalu; SMK Kolombong
Inanam (N18)	Bantayan	171/18/11	SK Bantayan

=== Representation history ===
Members of Parliament for Sepanggar
Parliament	No	Years	Member	Party	Vote Share
Constituency created from Gaya and Tuaran
11th	P171	2004-2008	Enchin Majimbun @ Eric	BN (SAPP)	16,226; 76.09%
12th	P171	2008	Enchin Majimbun @ Eric	BN (SAPP)	16,884; 64.90%
12th	P171	2008-2013	Enchin Majimbun @ Eric	SAPP	16,884; 64.90%
13th	P171	2013-2018	Jumat Idris (جومت إدريس)	BN (UMNO)	22,845; 54.07%
14th	P171	2018-2022	Azis Jamman (محمد عزيز بن زمان)	WARISAN	28,420; 59.47%
15th	P171	2022–present	Mustapha Sakmud (مصطفى سقمود)	PH (PKR)	27,022; 38.44%

=== State constituency ===
Parliamentary constituency	State constituency					
Parliamentary constituency	1967–1974	1974–1985	1985–1995	1995–2004	2004–2020	2020–present
Sepanggar						Darau
Sepanggar					Inanam	
Sepanggar					Karambunai	

=== Historical boundaries ===
State Constituency	Area	
State Constituency	2003	2019
Darau		Darau; Kampung Likas; Taman Kemajuan; Taman Kingfisher; Taman Ujana
Inanam	Bundusan; Kionsom; Kolombong; Menggatal; Telipok	Bukit Padang; Kionsom; Kolombong; Menggatal; Taman Aman
Karambunai	Kampung Gudon; Kampung Likas; Kampung Pulau; Karambunai; Sepanggar	Kampung Gudon; Kampung Pulau; Karambunai; Sepanggar; Telipok

=== Current state assembly members ===
No.	State Constituency	Member	Coalition (Party)
N16	Karambunai	Aliakbar Gulasan	PN (PAS)
N17	Darau	Azhar Matussin	WARISAN
N18	Inanam	Edna Jessica Majimbun	WARISAN

=== Local governments & postcodes ===
No.	State Constituency	Local Government	Postcode
N16	Karambunai	Kota Kinabalu City Hall	88400, 88450, 88460, 88520, 88680 Kota Kinabalu
N17	Darau	Kota Kinabalu City Hall	88400, 88450, 88460, 88520, 88680 Kota Kinabalu
N18	Inanam	Kota Kinabalu City Hall	88400, 88450, 88460, 88520, 88680 Kota Kinabalu

== Election results ==
Malaysian general election, 2022
Party	Candidate	Votes	%	∆%
PH	Mustapha Sakmud	27,022	38.44	▲38.44
BN	Yakubah Khan	19,980	28.42	▼3.88
Heritage	Azis Jamman	18,594	26.45	▼33.02
KDM	Jumardie Lukman	3,977	5.66	▲5.66
PEJUANG	Yusof Kunchang	731	1.04	▲1.04
Total valid votes		70,304	100.00	
Total rejected ballots		975		
Unreturned ballots		384		
Turnout		71,663	64.87	▼13.66
Registered electors		108,370		
Majority		7,042	10.02	▼17.15
PH gain from Heritage		Swing		?
Source(s) https://lom.agc.gov.my/ilims/upload/portal/akta/outputp/1753262/PUB619_2022.pdf

Malaysian general election, 2018
Party	Candidate	Votes	%	∆%
Sabah Heritage Party	Azis Jamman	28,420	59.47	▲59.47
BN	Abdul Rahman Dahlan	15,436	32.30	▼21.77
SAPP	Jeffrey Kumin	2,958	6.19	▼3.44
Love Sabah Party	Robert Sopining	971	2.03	▲2.03
Total valid votes		47,785	100.00	
Total rejected ballots		913		
Unreturned ballots		314		
Turnout		49,012	78.53	▼2.97
Registered electors		62,415		
Majority		12,984	27.17	▲4.82
Sabah Heritage Party gain from BN		Swing		?
Source(s) "His Majesty's Government Gazette - Notice of Contested Election, Parliament for the State of Sabah [P.U. (B) 246/2018]" (PDF). Attorney General's Chambers of Malaysia. 3 May 2018. "Federal Government Gazette - Results of Contested Election and Statements of the Poll after the Official Addition of Votes, Parliamentary Constituencies for the State of Sabah [P.U. (B) 320/2018]" (PDF). Attorney General's Chambers of Malaysia. 28 May 2018. Archived from the original (PDF) on 2019-12-29.

Malaysian general election, 2013
Party	Candidate	Votes	%	∆%
BN	Jumat Idris	22,845	54.07	▼10.83
DAP	Jeffrey Kumin @ John	13,403	31.72	▲17.46
SAPP	Don Chin Hon Kiong	4,070	9.63	▲9.63
STAR	Daniel John Jambun	1,931	4.57	▲4.57
Total valid votes		42,249	100.00	
Total rejected ballots		1,167		
Unreturned ballots		84		
Turnout		43,500	81.50	▲12.74
Registered electors		53,374		
Majority		9,442	22.35	▼21.71
BN hold		Swing		
Source(s) "Federal Government Gazette - Notice of Contested Election, Parliament for the State of Sabah [P.U. (B) 183/2013]" (PDF). Attorney General's Chambers of Malaysia. 26 April 2013. Archived from the original (PDF) on 2018-09-30. "Federal Government Gazette - Results of Contested Election and Statements of the Poll after the Official Addition of Votes, Parliamentary Constituencies for the State of Sabah [P.U. (B) 224/2013]" (PDF). Attorney General's Chambers of Malaysia. 22 May 2013. Archived from the original (PDF) on 2018-09-30.

Malaysian general election, 2008
Party	Candidate	Votes	%	∆%
BN	Enchin Majimbun @ Eric	16,884	64.90	▼11.19
PKR	Mohd Ibrahim Abdullah @ Yembun	5,423	20.84	▼3.07
DAP	Ewol Muji	3,709	14.26	▲14.26
Total valid votes		26,016	100.00	
Total rejected ballots		790		
Unreturned ballots		184		
Turnout		26,990	68.76	▲4.80
Registered electors		39,251		
Majority		11,461	44.06	▼8.12
BN hold		Swing		

Malaysian general election, 2004
Party	Candidate	Votes	%
BN	Enchin Majimbun @ Eric	16,226	76.09
PKR	Saidatul Badru Mohd Said	5,098	23.91
Total valid votes		21,324	100.00
Total rejected ballots		727	
Unreturned ballots		32	
Turnout		22,083	63.96
Registered electors			
Majority		11,128	52.18
This was a new constituency created.
