= Yeo Bee Yin =

Malaysian politician and field engineer

Yang Berhormat Datin Yeo Bee Yin MP
- 杨美盈

Minister of Energy, Science, Technology, Environment and Climate Change
- In office 2 July 2018 – 24 February 2020
- Monarchs: Muhammad V (2018–2019); Abdullah (2019–2020)
- Prime Minister: Mahathir Mohamad
- Deputy: Isnaraissah Munirah Majilis
- Preceded by: Wilfred Madius Tangau (Science, Technology); Maximus Ongkili (Energy); Wan Junaidi Tuanku Jaafar (Environment)
- Succeeded by: Khairy Jamaluddin (Science, Technology); Shamsul Anuar Nasarah (Energy); Tuan Ibrahim Tuan Man (Environment)
- Constituency: Bakri

Member of the Malaysian Parliament for Puchong
- Incumbent
- Assumed office 19 November 2022
- Preceded by: Gobind Singh Deo (PH–DAP)
- Majority: 57,957 (2022)

Member of the Malaysian Parliament for Bakri
- In office 9 May 2018 – 19 November 2022
- Preceded by: Er Teck Hwa (PR–DAP)
- Succeeded by: Tan Hong Pin (PH–DAP)
- Majority: 23,211 (2018)

Member of the Selangor State Legislative Assembly for Damansara Utama
- In office 5 May 2013 – 9 May 2018
- Preceded by: Cheah Wing Yin (PR–DAP)
- Succeeded by: Position abolished
- Majority: 30,689 (2013)

National Publicity Secretary of the Democratic Action Party
- Incumbent
- Assumed office 16 March 2025
- Assistant: Young Syefura Othman; Wong Shu Qi
- Secretary-General: Anthony Loke Siew Fook
- Preceded by: Teo Nie Ching

Deputy Women Chief of the Democratic Action Party
- Incumbent
- Assumed office 9 September 2023
- Secretary-General: Anthony Loke Siew Fook
- Women Chief: Teo Nie Ching

State Secretary of the Democratic Action Party of Selangor
- Incumbent
- Assumed office 10 November 2024
- Assistant: Tony Leong Tuck Chee
- Secretary-General: Anthony Loke Siew Fook
- State Chairman: Ng Sze Han
- Preceded by: Ng Sze Han

Assistant National Publicity Secretary of the Democratic Action Party
- In office 12 November 2017 – 20 March 2022 Serving with Zairil Khir Johari
- National Publicity Secretary: Tony Pua Kiam Wee
- Secretary-General: Lim Guan Eng
- Succeeded by: Ganabatirau Veraman

Personal details
- Born: Yeo Bee Yin; 26 May 1983 (age 43) Segamat, Johor, Malaysia
- Citizenship: Malaysian
- Party: Democratic Action Party (DAP)
- Other political affiliations: Pakatan Rakyat (PR) (2008–2015); Pakatan Harapan (PH) (since 2015)
- Spouse: Lee Yeow Seng (m. 2019)
- Children: 5
- Alma mater: Sekolah Jenis Kebangsaan (C) Hwa Nan, Batu Anam; Universiti Teknologi Petronas; Corpus Christi College, Cambridge
- Occupation: Politician
- Profession: Field engineer
- Website: yeobeeyin.blogspot.com

Chinese name
- Traditional Chinese: 楊美盈
- Simplified Chinese: 杨美盈
Transcriptions
Standard Mandarin
- Hanyu Pinyin: Yáng Měiyíng
Southern Min
- Hokkien POJ: Iôⁿ Bí-êng
- Yeo Bee Yin on Facebook; Yeo Bee Yin on Parliament of Malaysia

Yeo Bee Yin (Chinese: 杨美盈) is a Malaysian politician and chemical engineer who has served as the Member of Parliament (MP) for Puchong since 2022. She previously represented Bakri in the Dewan Rakyat from 2018 to 2022 and served as the Member of the Selangor State Legislative Assembly (MLA) for Damansara Utama from 2013 to 2018.

A member of the Democratic Action Party (DAP), a component party of the Pakatan Harapan (PH) coalition, Yeo served as the Minister of Energy, Science, Technology, Environment and Climate Change from 2018 to 2020 under Prime Minister Mahathir Mohamad during the Pakatan Harapan administration. During her ministerial tenure, she oversaw policies relating to renewable energy, environmental protection, climate change, science and innovation, and Malaysia's transition towards sustainable development.

Following the 2022 general election, Yeo was elected as the Member of Parliament for Puchong after previously representing Bakri for two parliamentary terms. Since June 2023, she has chaired the Parliamentary Special Select Committee on Women, Children and Community Development, leading parliamentary inquiries and policy recommendations on issues including early childhood care and education, child protection, anti-bullying measures and women's participation in leadership.

Within the Democratic Action Party, Yeo serves as the party's National Publicity Secretary, Selangor State Secretary and Deputy National Women Chief.

Before entering politics, Yeo worked as a chemical engineer in the energy industry. She graduated from the University of Cambridge with a degree in Chemical Engineering before returning to Malaysia to enter public service.

== Early life and education ==
Yeo was born on 26 May 1983 in Segamat, Johor, and spent her early childhood at Gomali Estate before her family relocated to Batu Anam. She was raised in a large family with five siblings. Her father worked as a rubber estate manager before becoming a small-scale rubber tapper, while her mother was a homemaker. Growing up in rural Johor, Yeo has described education as the principal avenue through which she sought to improve her future.

She received her primary education at SJK (C) Hwa Nan in Batu Anam before attending SMJK Seg Hwa in Segamat. During her secondary school years, she was active in academic and co-curricular activities and later credited her teachers and school environment for cultivating her interest in mathematics and science.

Yeo was awarded a Petronas scholarship to pursue a Bachelor of Chemical Engineering degree at Universiti Teknologi Petronas (UTP). She graduated with first-class honours in 2006.

Following graduation, Yeo joined the multinational oilfield services company Schlumberger as a field engineer. Her work involved assignments in Malaysia and overseas, providing exposure to the petroleum industry and multinational corporate operations.

In 2009, she was awarded the prestigious Gates Cambridge Scholarship to pursue an MPhil in Advanced Chemical Engineering at Corpus Christi College, Cambridge, University of Cambridge. She completed the programme with a commendation.

While studying and working abroad, Yeo has said that developments surrounding the 2008 Malaysian general election prompted her to reconsider her long-term career plans and eventual return to Malaysia. Although she had not initially intended to enter politics, she later described this period as the beginning of her growing interest in public policy, governance and national development.

== Political career ==
=== Entry into politics ===
Following the completion of her postgraduate studies at the University of Cambridge, Yeo returned to Malaysia at a time of significant political change following the 2008 Malaysian general election, which saw the opposition make unprecedented electoral gains. She later described the election as a turning point that prompted her to reconsider her long-term career ambitions and become more interested in public policy, governance and institutional reform.

After returning to Malaysia, Yeo became involved with the Democratic Action Party (DAP), initially volunteering for the party before formally joining it in 2012 alongside economist Ong Kian Ming. She subsequently served as a social media strategist for DAP and as special assistant to Tony Pua, then the Member of Parliament for Petaling Jaya Utara. Under Pua's mentorship, Yeo gained experience in policy research, constituency service and political communications, while becoming increasingly involved in the party's organisational and policy work.

Yeo has cited the opportunity to contribute to institutional reform and evidence-based policymaking as key motivations for entering politics. Drawing on her engineering background, she advocated applying analytical and data-driven approaches to public administration and governance, themes that would later feature prominently in both her parliamentary work and her published writings.

In preparation for the 2013 Malaysian general election, DAP selected Yeo to contest the Damansara Utama state constituency in Selangor, marking her first electoral contest.

=== Selangor State Legislative Assembly (2013–2018) ===
==== Election to Damansara Utama ====
In the 2013 Malaysian general election, Yeo made her electoral debut as the Democratic Action Party (DAP) candidate for the Damansara Utama seat in the Selangor State Legislative Assembly. Contesting under the DAP as part of the Pakatan Rakyat coalition, she received 37,303 votes, or 84.21 per cent of the votes cast. She defeated Malaysian Chinese Association candidate Lim Choon Kin, who received 6,614 votes, and independent candidate Liew Wei Beng, who received 380 votes. Yeo won the seat with a majority of 30,689 votes.

The result gave Yeo the largest majority recorded for a state legislative seat in the 2013 general election. At the age of 29, she also became the youngest member of the Selangor State Legislative Assembly during the 2013–2018 term.

==== Legislative and committee work ====
As a first-term assemblywoman, Yeo focused on issues relating to institutional governance, public accountability and state administration. She was an active participant in debates in the Selangor State Legislative Assembly, where she spoke on matters including state finances, public procurement, water restructuring, local government and public service delivery.

During her tenure, Yeo also became involved in discussions surrounding the restructuring of Selangor's water industry, an issue that dominated state politics during the period. She later described the experience as formative in shaping her understanding of public policy, negotiations between different levels of government and the importance of institutional reforms in improving governance.

Beyond her legislative responsibilities, Yeo maintained constituency service in Damansara Utama, addressing municipal issues, infrastructure improvements and residents' concerns while regularly engaging with local communities.

==== Transition to federal politics ====
In March 2018, the Democratic Action Party announced that Yeo would leave the Damansara Utama state seat to contest the federal constituency of Bakri in Johor at the 2018 Malaysian general election. The move formed part of the party's electoral strategy to strengthen its presence in Johor, where several senior leaders were fielded in key parliamentary constituencies.

=== Member of Parliament for Bakri (2018–2022) ===
==== 2018 general election ====
In March 2018, the Democratic Action Party (DAP) announced that Yeo would contest the parliamentary constituency of Bakri in Johor at the 2018 Malaysian general election, leaving the Damansara Utama state seat after a single term. The move formed part of the party's strategy to strengthen its presence in Johor ahead of the election.

At the general election held on 9 May 2018, Yeo was elected as the Member of Parliament for Bakri after receiving 38,718 votes (62.65%), defeating Koh Chon Chai of the Malaysian Chinese Association (MCA), who received 15,507 votes (25.09%), and PAS candidate Md Zahrul Salleh, who received 7,575 votes (12.26%). She won the constituency with a majority of 23,211 votes as Pakatan Harapan formed the Federal Government for the first time in Malaysia's history.

==== Minister of Energy, Science, Technology, Environment and Climate Change (2018–2020) ====
===== Appointment =====
Following the victory of Pakatan Harapan (PH) in the 2018 Malaysian general election, Prime Minister Mahathir Mohamad announced his first Cabinet on 21 May 2018, appointing Yeo as the Minister of Energy, Science, Technology, Environment and Climate Change (MESTECC). At the age of 35, she was among the youngest members of the Cabinet.

The newly established ministry combined the portfolios of energy, green technology, science, technology, innovation, environment and climate change under a single ministry. As minister, Yeo was responsible for formulating and implementing national policies relating to renewable energy, electricity supply, scientific research, technological innovation, environmental protection and Malaysia's climate commitments under international agreements.

During her tenure, Yeo introduced a number of policy reforms aimed at accelerating Malaysia's transition towards renewable energy, strengthening environmental governance, promoting science and innovation, and improving the country's sustainability agenda. Several initiatives introduced during her administration, including reforms to the Net Energy Metering (NEM) programme and stricter regulation of imported plastic waste, received both domestic and international attention.

===== Renewable energy =====
One of Yeo's principal policy priorities was expanding Malaysia's renewable energy sector and reducing the country's dependence on fossil fuels. During her tenure, the ministry introduced reforms to the Net Energy Metering (NEM) programme to improve its commercial viability and encourage greater adoption of rooftop solar photovoltaic systems by households, businesses and industrial users.

Her ministry also continued the implementation of the Large Scale Solar (LSS) competitive bidding programme, which sought to increase renewable energy generation through utility-scale solar projects while reducing generation costs through open tender. The programme contributed to the declining cost of solar electricity in Malaysia and supported the government's target of increasing the share of renewable energy in the national electricity mix.

In 2019, MESTECC announced the country's target of increasing renewable energy capacity to 20 per cent of installed electricity generation capacity by 2025, excluding large hydroelectric projects. The target was presented as part of Malaysia's broader transition towards a lower-carbon economy and was supported by new regulatory frameworks and market reforms to encourage private-sector investment in renewable energy.

===== Environmental policy =====
In 2018, MESTECC launched the Malaysia Roadmap Towards Zero Single-Use Plastics 2018–2030, which outlined a phased approach to reducing the use of single-use plastic products through regulatory measures, industry engagement and public awareness initiatives. The roadmap formed part of the government's broader strategy to improve waste management and transition towards a circular economy.

Environmental protection was another major focus of Yeo's tenure as minister. Shortly after taking office, she pledged to strengthen the enforcement of environmental regulations and address Malaysia's growing role as a destination for imported plastic waste following China's ban on foreign plastic waste imports in 2018.

Under Yeo's leadership, MESTECC conducted nationwide enforcement operations against illegal plastic recycling facilities that were found to be operating without the necessary licences or in breach of environmental regulations. The ministry also tightened approval procedures for plastic waste imports and increased inspections of imported waste shipments.

In May 2019, Yeo announced that Malaysia would return approximately 3,000 tonnes of contaminated and non-recyclable plastic waste to its countries of origin, stating that the country would not become "the dumping ground of the world". The shipments were returned to countries including the United States, the United Kingdom, Canada, Australia and several European nations.

Malaysia subsequently repatriated additional shipments of illegally imported plastic waste during Yeo's tenure while supporting international efforts to strengthen controls on the transboundary movement of plastic waste under the Basel Convention. Her ministry also worked with customs and environmental authorities to improve enforcement against illegal waste trafficking and promote environmentally sound waste management practices.

===== Science, technology and innovation =====
As minister, Yeo also oversaw Malaysia's science, technology and innovation (STI) agenda, with an emphasis on strengthening research and development (R&D), commercialisation, and collaboration between academia, industry and government. The ministry continued initiatives to promote science and technology as drivers of economic growth while encouraging greater participation in science, technology, engineering and mathematics (STEM) education.

In 2019, MESTECC launched the National 4IR Policy Framework to guide Malaysia's preparedness for the Fourth Industrial Revolution. The framework identified strategic priorities in areas such as artificial intelligence, the Internet of Things, blockchain technology and advanced manufacturing, while promoting greater digital transformation across the public and private sectors.

Yeo also advocated greater investment in research and innovation to improve Malaysia's long-term economic competitiveness, emphasising the need for stronger cooperation between universities, research institutions and industry to accelerate the commercialisation of locally developed technologies.

===== End of tenure =====
Yeo's tenure as Minister of Energy, Science, Technology, Environment and Climate Change ended on 24 February 2020 following the collapse of the Pakatan Harapan administration during the 2020–2022 Malaysian political crisis, commonly known as the Sheraton Move. Prime Minister Mahathir Mohamad resigned on the same day, resulting in the dissolution of the Cabinet. Yeo remained the Member of Parliament for Bakri after leaving office.

=== Opposition parliamentarian (2020–2022) ===
Following the collapse of the Pakatan Harapan (PH) administration in February 2020, Yeo returned to the opposition benches as the Member of Parliament for Bakri. During the administrations of Prime Ministers Muhyiddin Yassin and Ismail Sabri Yaakob, she continued to participate in parliamentary debates, focusing on issues including energy policy, climate change, environmental protection, governance and economic recovery.

During the COVID-19 pandemic, Yeo advocated evidence-based policymaking and commented publicly on matters relating to public health, economic recovery and government accountability. She also continued to speak on Malaysia's energy transition and environmental sustainability, drawing on her experience as a former minister.

==== 2022 general election ====
Ahead of the 2022 Malaysian general election, DAP announced that Yeo would contest the parliamentary constituency of Puchong in Selangor, replacing incumbent Gobind Singh Deo, who was nominated to contest the newly redelineated constituency of Damansara.

At the general election held on 19 November 2022, Yeo was elected as the Member of Parliament for Puchong after receiving 79,425 votes (65.67%), defeating Syed Ibrahim Syed Abdul Kader of Barisan Nasional (21,468 votes), Jimmy Chew Jyh Gang of Perikatan Nasional (18,263 votes) and independent candidate Kuan Chee Heng (1,793 votes). She won the seat with a majority of 57,957 votes.

Yeo's election marked her return to representing a constituency in Selangor after serving one parliamentary term as the Member of Parliament for Bakri in Johor.

=== Member of Parliament for Puchong (2022–present) ===
Following the 2022 Malaysian general election, Yeo was elected as the Member of Parliament for Puchong, succeeding Gobind Singh Deo, who contested and won the neighbouring constituency of Damansara.

==== Chairperson of the Parliamentary Special Select Committee ====
In June 2023, Yeo was appointed chairperson of the Parliamentary Special Select Committee on Women, Children and Community Development. Parliament's official committee profile lists her as its chairperson and Member of Parliament for Puchong.

As chairperson, Yeo has led the committee's examination of policies and legislation concerning women, children and community development. The committee has conducted proceedings and published reports on matters including the establishment of a children's commission, the criminal justice system for child sexual-abuse victims and the welfare of refugees in Malaysia.

==== Parliamentary work ====
===== Energy transition and climate policy =====
Following her return to the government backbench in 2022, Yeo continued to participate in parliamentary debates on Malaysia's energy transition, renewable energy and climate policy. Drawing on her experience as former Minister of Energy, Science, Technology, Environment and Climate Change, she has spoken on issues including electricity market reform, renewable energy capacity and Malaysia's long-term energy-transition targets.

In 2023, Yeo called for Malaysia's prohibition on renewable-energy exports to be lifted, arguing that the restriction could divert investment and green-industry employment to neighbouring countries. The government subsequently announced that the export ban would be removed as part of its efforts to accelerate Malaysia's energy transition.

===== Anti-Bullying Bill =====
As chairperson of the Parliamentary Special Select Committee on Women, Children and Community Development, Yeo led the committee's inquiry into bullying among school students. The committee conducted a series of engagements and public consultations before tabling its report to Parliament, which recommended the enactment of dedicated anti-bullying legislation and a comprehensive framework for the prevention, reporting and management of bullying cases in educational institutions.

The committee's recommendations were subsequently reflected in the Anti-Bully Bill 2025, which was tabled and passed by Parliament in December 2025.

===== Social Work Professionals Bill =====
As chairperson of the Parliamentary Special Select Committee on Women, Children and Community Development, Yeo oversaw the committee's scrutiny of the Social Work Professionals Bill. The committee conducted engagements with government agencies, professional bodies, academics and civil society organisations before submitting its recommendations to strengthen the proposed legislation, including matters relating to professional registration, governance and standards of practice for social workers.

The committee submitted its report and recommendations to Parliament as part of the legislative scrutiny process prior to the Bill's passage. Yeo described the legislation as an important step towards recognising social work as a regulated profession and strengthening professional standards for social workers in Malaysia.

==== Kiddo Food Bank ====
In October 2023, Yeo launched the Kiddo Food Bank programme in Puchong to address child malnutrition and stunting among children from low-income households. The initiative provides participating families with a year's supply of fortified milk and nutritional assistance, while also monitoring children's growth and promoting nutrition education for parents. The programme focuses on children during the first 1,000 days of life, a critical period for physical and cognitive development.

The programme was developed in collaboration with healthcare professionals, non-governmental organisations and private-sector partners, and incorporates health screening and data collection to monitor children's nutritional outcomes. According to Yeo, the initiative was designed not only to provide food assistance but also to serve as a pilot model for evidence-based public policies to combat child malnutrition in Malaysia.

== Party leadership ==
Yeo has been elected to the Democratic Action Party (DAP)'s Central Executive Committee (CEC) on multiple occasions. Following the party's 18th National Congress in March 2025, she was appointed National Publicity Secretary, succeeding Teo Nie Ching, who became one of the party's national vice-chairpersons.

== Personal life ==
Yeo married Lee Yeow Seng, the chief executive officer of IOI Properties Group, in March 2019.

The couple have five sons, including identical twins born in 2026.

== Election results ==
Selangor State Legislative Assembly
Year	Constituency	Candidate	Votes	Pct	Opponent(s)	Votes	Pct	Ballots cast	Majority	Turnout
2013	N36 Damansara Utama	Yeo Bee Yin (DAP)	37,303	84.21%	Lim Choon Kin (MCA)	6,614	14.93%	44,654	30,689	83.63%
2013	N36 Damansara Utama	Yeo Bee Yin (DAP)	37,303	84.21%	Liew Wei Beng (IND)	380	0.86%	44,654	30,689	83.63%

Parliament of Malaysia
Year	Constituency	Candidate	Votes	Pct	Opponent(s)	Votes	Pct	Ballots cast	Majority	Turnout
2018	P145 Bakri	Yeo Bee Yin (DAP)	38,718	62.65%	Koh Chon Chai (MCA)	15,507	25.09%	61,800	23,211	84.50%
2018	P145 Bakri	Yeo Bee Yin (DAP)	38,718	62.65%	Md Zahrul Salleh (PAS)	7,575	12.26%	61,800	23,211	84.50%
2022	P103 Puchong	Yeo Bee Yin (DAP)	79,425	65.67%	Syed Ibrahim Syed Abdul Kadir (KIMMA)	21,468	17.75%	122,437	57,957	79.12%
2022	P103 Puchong	Yeo Bee Yin (DAP)	79,425	65.67%	Jimmy Chew Jyh Gang (Gerakan)	18,263	15.10%	122,437	57,957	79.12%
2022	P103 Puchong	Yeo Bee Yin (DAP)	79,425	65.67%	Kuan Chee Heng (IND)	1,793	1.48%	122,437	57,957	79.12%

== Honours and recognitions ==
=== Honours ===
- Malaysia
  - 17th Yang di-Pertuan Agong Installation Medal (2024)

=== International recognition ===
- Included in Nature's 10 ("Top 10 People Who Mattered in Science in 2018") by the scientific journal Nature, in recognition of her work on renewable energy and plastic waste policy.
- Named one of the "7 people who stood up for our planet in 2018" by Eco-Business.
- Named one of "25 female climate leaders shaping 2019" by The Ecologist.
- Selected as a Young Global Leader (Class of 2019) by the World Economic Forum.

== Publications ==
- Yeo, Bee Yin (2018). Reimagining Malaysia. Democratic Action Party. ISBN 9789839820652.
- Yeo, Bee Yin (2022). The (Un)Finished Business: Climate Change, Energy, Environment, Science, Technology and Innovation. Kuala Lumpur: Research for Social Advancement (REFSA). ISBN 9789675942259.

Political offices
Preceded by Wilfred Madius Tangau as Minister of Science, Technology and Innovation	Minister of Energy, Science, Technology, Environment and Climate Change; 2 July 2018–24 February 2020	Succeeded by Khairy Jamaluddin as Minister of Science, Technology and Innovation
Parliament of Malaysia
Preceded by Er Teck Hwa	Member of Parliament for Bakri; 9 May 2018–present	Incumbent
