= Er Teck Hwa =

Malaysian politician

- 余德华

Member of the Malaysian Parliament for Bakri
- In office 8 March 2008 – 9 May 2018
- Preceded by: Chua Jui Meng (BN–MCA)
- Succeeded by: Yeo Bee Yin (PH–DAP)
- Majority: 722 (2008); 5,067 (2013)

Personal details
- Born: 17 December 1972 (age 53) Muar, Johor, Malaysia
- Citizenship: Malaysian
- Party: Democratic Action Party (DAP)
- Other political affiliations: Pakatan Harapan (PH); Pakatan Rakyat (PR)
- Occupation: Politician
- Website: erteckhwa.blogspot.com

Er Teck Hwa (simplified Chinese: 余德华; traditional Chinese: 余德華; pinyin: Yú Dé Huá; Pe̍h-ōe-jī: Û Tek-hôa; born 17 December 1972) is a Malaysian politician. Er was the two-term Member of Parliament (MP) for the Bakri constituency in the State of Johor from 2008 to 2018. He is a member of the Democratic Action Party (DAP), a component party in the Pakatan Harapan (PH) coalition.

== Early education ==
He started his primary education in SJK(C) Chung Hwa 2A, Muar. He continued his secondary education in SMK Jalan Junid, Muar, Johor.

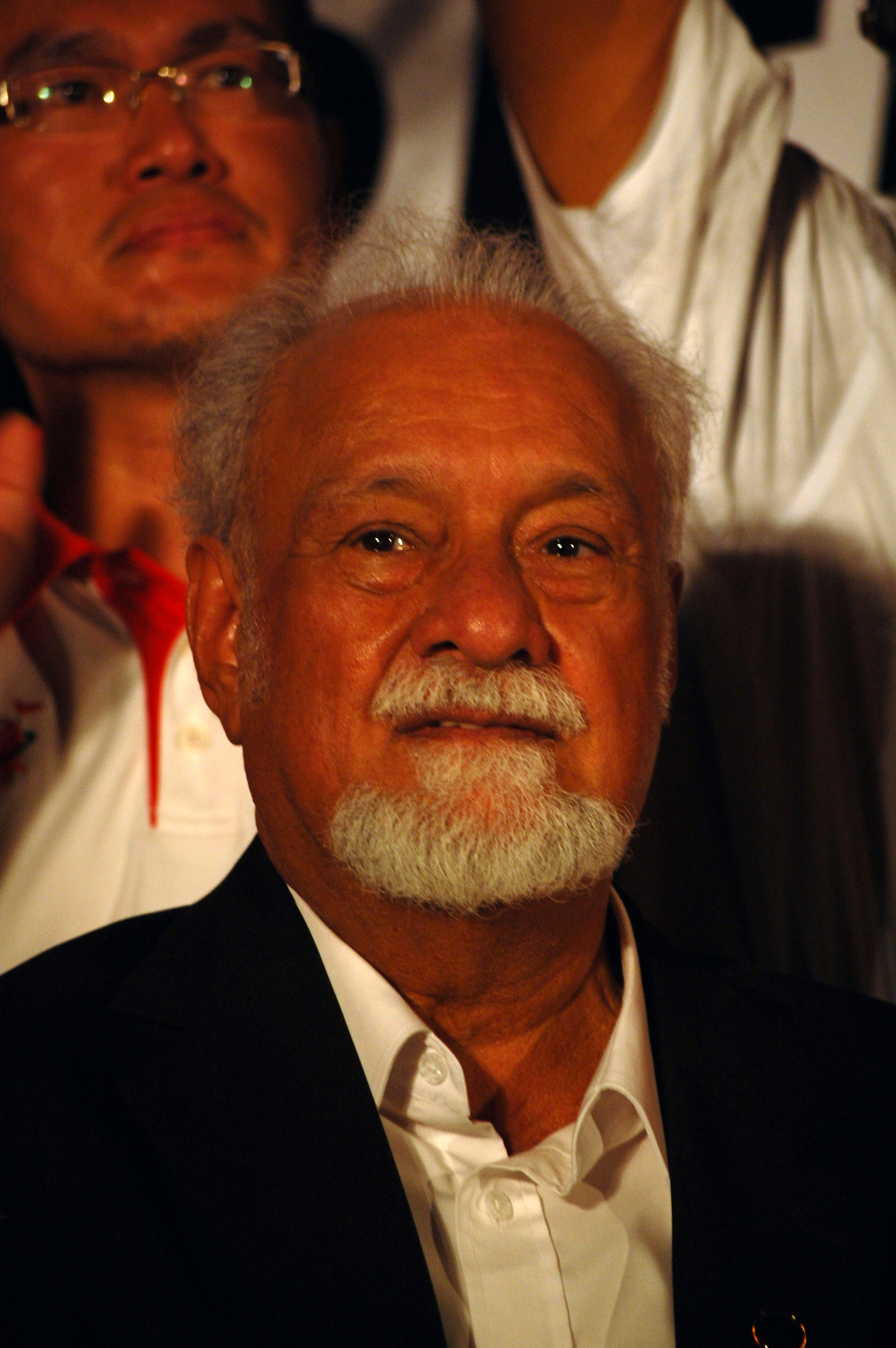
Er (back) campaigning with DAP leader Karpal Singh in Kuching in 2011.

== Political career ==
In the 2008 general election, Er representing DAP had created history by winning the Bakri constituency to be the first MP from opposition, other than the governing Barisan Nasional (BN) coalition or its predecessor, the Alliance Party, from the Johor state ever elected to the Parliament of Malaysia since Independence. Upon his election, Er, a Mandarin speaker, stated that he was planning to hire private tutors to improve his Malay and English language skills to communicate more effectively with his constituents.

The Star columnist Lee Yuk Peng has said that Er has impacted parliament with his "efforts to bring issues close to the heart for parliamentary deliberation" and had the "reputation of being a hard working and dedicated MP" prepared to ask questions in parliament despite his lack of proficiency in Malay. Persistence paid off for Er when his second emergency motion on the accident involving an express bus was allowed to be debated in Parliament on 3 November 2010. He filed his first emergency motion on the fatal accident in Simpang Ampat on 14 October 2010 but it was dismissed on 18 October 2010. This was also the first emergency motion to be allowed in 2010 as most of them were rejected on the grounds that there was no urgency for the matters raised.

Er was successfully reelected again in the 2013 general election with a bigger majority for the second term. Somehow Er did not seek a third term reelection for his Bakri parliamentary seat in the 2018 general election to make way for Yeo Bee Yin, the former Selangor State Legislative Assemblywoman of Damansara Utama who successfully defended the seat for DAP.

== Election results ==
Parliament of Malaysia
Year	Constituency	Candidate	Votes	Pct	Opponent(s)	Votes	Pct	Ballots cast	Majority	Turnout
2008	P145 Bakri	Er Teck Hwa (DAP)	21,051	48.77%	Tay Puay Chuan (MCA)	20,329	47.09%	43,168	722	76.55%
2013	P145 Bakri	Er Teck Hwa (DAP)	31,118	53.40%	Lee Ching Yong (MCA)	26,051	44.71%	58,270	5,067	86.71%

== See also ==
- Bakri (federal constituency)
