= Song Sing Kwee =

Malaysian lawyer and former politician

- 宋新辉
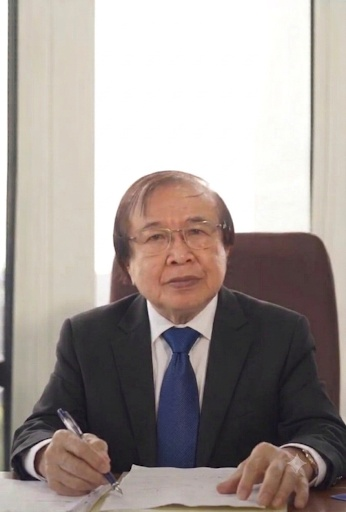
- Song Sing Kwee in a portrait photograph
- Occupations: Lawyer, politician
- Office: Member of the Johor State Legislative Assembly for Maharani (1986–1990)
- Political party: Democratic Action Party (former Johor state chairman); Parti Rakyat Malaysia (former national deputy chairman and Johor state chairman)

Song Sing Kwee (Chinese: 宋新辉; also known as SK Song) is a Malaysian lawyer and former politician. He represented the Maharani constituency in the Johor State Legislative Assembly from 1986 to 1990 and earlier headed the Democratic Action Party (DAP) in Johor. He later held national and state posts in the Parti Rakyat Malaysia (People's Party of Malaysia), including national deputy chairman and Johor state chairman. In 1980 he founded the law firm SK Song Advocates & Solicitors in Johor Bahru.

== Early life and legal career ==
Song founded the law firm SK Song Advocates & Solicitors in Johor Bahru; the firm's website states that it has served clients since 1980.

In February 2017, eight teenage cyclists were killed in a collision in Johor Bahru, and Song acted as the lawyer for the driver, Sam Ke Ting. China Press reported on 18 March 2017 that the police investigation had been completed and that Sam was to be charged under Section 41(1) of the Road Transport Act 1987 (dangerous driving causing death), with the court date to be notified later; Song, as her lawyer, commented on the case. In May 2017, reports said Sam had changed her lawyers.

== Political career ==
=== Democratic Action Party ===
According to a 2026 commentary in Oriental Daily News, Song was chairman of the Johor DAP before 1982. In the 1982 Malaysian general election he contested the Kulai state seat as a DAP candidate and lost by 761 votes to the MCA-aligned candidate, the best result among Johor DAP candidates in that election. In the 1986 Malaysian general election he won the Maharani state seat in northern Johor and served as its assemblyman until 1990.

China Press commentaries have listed him among former Johor DAP chairmen who later left the party. In a January 2024 interview with the paper, he said he had not held elected office since 1990.

=== Parti Rakyat Malaysia ===
In January 2008, Song and Wee Choo Keong lodged a report with the Anti-Corruption Agency alleging that Lim Kit Siang had sold Approved Permits (APs).

Following the 2008 Malaysian general election, Song — then secretary-general of the People's Party — said at a press conference in Johor Bahru on 11 March that the party would decide within two weeks how to cooperate with the People's Justice Party (PKR), either by joining it or by forming an alliance. He acknowledged defeat in his own contest but welcomed the growth of the opposition.

In March 2009, speaking as Johor PRM chairman, Song described the government's RM60 billion economic stimulus package as neither the most effective nor a long-term approach, and said the disbursement of funds needed strict oversight to avoid a national crisis from non-transparent operations.

After PRM national chairman Hassan Abdul Karim resigned on 17 November 2009, Song, a party central committee member, told The Star that the party would restructure its top leadership within four to six weeks and elect a new national chairman and deputy chairman. He added that he had resigned as national deputy chairman three months earlier to make way for other leaders, while remaining Johor state chairman and a central committee member.

In January 2010, as Johor PRM chairman, Song criticised the real property gains tax measure in the 2010 federal budget — a flat 5% tax on profits from property sales — as confusing, and said many government policies were introduced without thorough consideration.

In 2017, as PRM national deputy chairman and Johor state chairman, Song acted as the lawyer for Sam Ke Ting in the cyclists case.

== Community activities ==
In December 2017, Song was invited as a lawyer to speak at an exhibition and sharing session in Johor Bahru marking the 30th anniversary of Operasi Lalang.

In January 2024, he announced that he would forgo his state assemblyman's pension and donate it to temples and to those in need. He said former state and federal lawmakers should not receive pensions after retirement, arguing that granting pensions to lawmakers depleted the public purse.
