= Japlin Akim =

Malaysian politician (born 1966)

Yang Berbahagia Datuk Japlin Akim PGDK ASDK ADK
- جڤلين اکيم

Ministerial roles (Sabah)
- 2004–2008: Assistant Minister of Agriculture and Food Industry
- 2008–2013: Assistant Minister of Infrastructure Development

Faction represented in Sabah State Legislative Assembly
- 2004–2013: Barisan Nasional
- 2018: Barisan Nasional
- 2018–2019: Independent
- 2019–2020: Pakatan Harapan
- 2020–2022: Malaysian United Indigenous Party
- 2023–2025: Gabungan Rakyat Sabah (coalition)
- 2023–2025: GAGASAN Rakyat Sabah Party (official political party)

Personal details
- Born: Japlin bin Akim @ Abd Hamid; 3 February 1966 (age 60) Kota Belud, Sabah, Malaysia
- Citizenship: Malaysian
- Party: United Malays National Organisation (UMNO) (until 2018); Malaysian United Indigenous Party (BERSATU) (2019–2022); GAGASAN Rakyat Sabah Party (PGRS) (2023–present)
- Other political affiliations: Barisan Nasional (BN) (until 2018); Perikatan Nasional (PN) (2020–2022); Gabungan Rakyat Sabah (GRS) (2023–present)
- Occupation: Politician

Japlin bin Akim @ Abd Hamid (born 3 February 1966) is a Malaysian politician who served as the State Assistant Minister. He served as the Member of Sabah State Legislative Assembly (MLA) for Usukan from May 2018 until September 2020. He is a member of the GAGASAN Rakyat Sabah Party (PGRS) which is a main component party together with the other 7 parties in Gabungan Rakyat Sabah (GRS) coalition in Sabah. He is the Division leader of GAGASAN Rakyat Sabah Party for Usukan Division.

== Election results ==
Sabah State Legislative Assembly
Year	Constituency	Candidate	Votes	Pct	Opponent(s)	Votes	Pct	Ballots cast	Majority	Turnout
2004	N08 Usukan	Japlin Akim (UMNO)	5,950	55.61%	Saijan Samit (IND)	4,215	39.39%	11,007	1,735	73.99%
2004	N08 Usukan	Japlin Akim (UMNO)	5,950	55.61%	Nordin Aloh (PAS)	413	3.86%	11,007	1,735	73.99%
2004	N08 Usukan	Japlin Akim (UMNO)	5,950	55.61%	Ibrahim Linggam (BERSEKUTU)	122	1.14%	11,007	1,735	73.99%
2008	N08 Usukan	Japlin Akim (UMNO)	7,964	66.90%	Mohd Shukor Abdul Mumin (PKR)	3,941	33.10%	12,241	4,023	77.54%
2018	N08 Usukan	Japlin Akim (UMNO)	8,738	52.40%	Abdul Bahkrin Mohd Yusof (WARISAN)	7,513	45.05%	17,138	1,225	82.40%
2018	N08 Usukan	Japlin Akim (UMNO)	8,738	52.40%	Adzmin Awang (PAS)	355	2.13%	17,138	1,225	82.40%
2018	N08 Usukan	Japlin Akim (UMNO)	8,738	52.40%	Amsor Tuah (IND)	70	0.42%	17,138	1,225	82.40%

== Honours ==
- Sabah
  - Member of the Order of Kinabalu (ADK) (2001)
  - Companion of the Order of Kinabalu (ASDK) (2005)
  - Commander of the Order of Kinabalu (PGDK) – Datuk (2006)
