= Edward Linggu =

Malaysian politician

Yang Berhormat Senator Datuk Edward Linggu Bukut PGDK JP

Senator Elected by the Sabah State Legislative Assembly
- Incumbent
- Assumed office 10 December 2024 Serving with Bobbey Ah Fang Suan
- Monarch: Ibrahim
- Prime Minister: Anwar Ibrahim
- Preceded by: Noraini Idris

Member of the Sabah State Legislative Assembly for Tamparuli
- In office 12/13 March 1999 – 21 March 2004
- Preceded by: Wilfred Bumburing (PBS)
- Succeeded by: Jahid Jahim (BN–PBS)

Secretary-General of the Homeland Solidarity Party
- Incumbent
- Assumed office 2 November 2021
- President: Jeffrey Kitingan
- Preceded by: Guan Dee Koh Hoi

Vice President of the Homeland Solidarity Party
- In office 2018–2021 Serving with Robert Tawik & Annuar Ayub
- President: Jeffrey Kitingan
- Succeeded by: Abidin Madingkir & Paul Porodong & Suling Isib & Apas Nawawi Saking

Personal details
- Born: Linggu @ Edward bin Bukut; 20 December 1958 (age 67)
- Citizenship: Malaysia
- Party: PBS (until 2001); PBRS (2001-?); Homeland Solidarity Party
- Other political affiliations: Gabungan Rakyat Sabah (GRS)
- Occupation: Politician

Linggu @ Edward bin Bukut, or commonly known as Edward Linggu is a Malaysian politician who has served as a Senator since December 2024. He had served as the Member of Sabah State Legislative Assembly (MLA) for Tamparuli from 1999 to 2004. He is a member of the Homeland Solidarity Party (STAR), a major component of the ruling Gabungan Rakyat Sabah (GRS) coalition. He has been the Secretary-General of STAR since 2021 and had served as a vice president from 2018 to 2021.

== Politics ==
In 2001, he quit PBS to join PBRS together with Jeffrey Kitingan. Then, he joined STAR and was appointed as a vice president before being appointed as the Secretary-general and also Strategy Director of the party. He had also participated in the 2013 Sabah state election for Tamparuli state seat again but ultimately lost.

== Election result ==
Sabah State Legislative Assembly
Year	Constituency	Candidate	Votes	Pct.	Opponent(s)	Votes	Pct.	Ballots cast	Majority	Turnout
1999	Tamparuli	Edward Linggu (PBS)	6,125	57.77%	Wilfred Bumburing (UPKO)	3,939	37.15%	10,603	2,186	78.62%
1999	Tamparuli	Edward Linggu (PBS)	6,125	57.77%	Monggoh Orow (BERSEKUTU)	475	4.48%	10,603	2,186	78.62%
2013	Tamparuli	Edward Linggu (STAR)	589	4.07%	Wilfred Bumburing (PKR)	6,862	47.43%	14,469	383	83.80%
2013	Tamparuli	Edward Linggu (STAR)	589	4.07%	Jahid Jahim (PBS)	6,479	44.78%	14,469	383	83.80%
2013	Tamparuli	Edward Linggu (STAR)	589	4.07%	Stephan Gaimin (SAPP)	185	1.28%	14,469	383	83.80%
2013	Tamparuli	Edward Linggu (STAR)	589	4.07%	James Ongkili Jr. (IND)	185	0.87%	14,469	383	83.80%

== Honours ==
- Malaysia
  - Recipient of the 17th Yang di-Pertuan Agong Installation Medal (2024)
- Sabah
  - Commander of the Order of Kinabalu (PGDK) – Datuk (2022)
  - Companion of the Order of Kinabalu (ASDK) (2006)
  - Justice of the Peace (JP) (2020)
