= Wilfred Bumburing =

Malaysian politician (born 1951)

Yang Berbahagia Datuk Seri Panglima Wilfred Bumburing PJN SPDK PGDK JSM

Member of the Malaysian Parliament for Tuaran
- In office 8 March 2008 – 5 May 2013
- Preceded by: Wilfred Madius Tangau (BN–UPKO)
- Succeeded by: Wilfred Madius Tangau (BN–UPKO)
- Majority: 6,622 (2008)

Member of the Sabah State Legislative Assembly for Tamparuli
- In office 21 April 1985 – 13 March 1999
- Preceded by: Clarence Elong Mansul
- Succeeded by: Edward Linggu Bukut
- In office 5 May 2013 – 9 May 2018
- Preceded by: Jahid Jahim (BN–PBS)
- Succeeded by: Jahid Jahim (PBS)

Personal details
- Born: Mojilip bin Bumburing @ Wilfred; 2 December 1951 (age 74) Tenghilan, Tamparuli, Tuaran, Crown Colony of North Borneo
- Party: United Sabah Party (PBS) (1985–1994); United Progressive Kinabalu Organisation (UPKO) (1994–2012, since 2024); People's Justice Party (PKR) (2012–2017); Love Sabah Party (PCS) (2017–2022); Parti Bersatu Rakyat Sabah (PBRS) (2022–2024)
- Other political affiliations: Barisan Nasional (BN) (1994–2012, 2022–2024); Pakatan Rakyat (PR) (2012–2014); Pakatan Harapan (PH) (2014–2016, 2024–2025)
- Occupation: Politician
- Website: https://wilfredbumburing.com

Yang Berbahagia Datuk Seri Panglima Mojilip bin Bumburing @ Wilfred (born 2 December 1951) is a Malaysian politician who served as the Deputy Chief Minister of Sabah and Member of the Sabah State Legislative Assembly (MLA) for Tamparuli from 1985 to 1999 and again from May 2013 to May 2018, Member of Parliament (MP) for Tuaran from March 2008 to May 2013.

Bumburing was first elected to the State Assembly in 1985, as a member of the United Sabah Party (PBS). In 1994, he joined Bernard Dompok in defecting from PBS to join the Barisan Nasional coalition, setting up the party that subsequently became the United Pasokmomogun Kadazandusun Murut Organisation (UPKO). He was a Deputy Chief Minister in the Barisan Nasional government.

He was elected to federal Parliament in the 2008 election for the seat of Tuaran. His election came after UPKO's incumbent member Wilfred Madius Tangau stood down citing the wishes of the party's leadership. In 2011, he left UPKO to sit in Parliament as a member of People's Justice Party (PKR) of the opposition Pakatan Rakyat coalition. He recontested the 2013 election as a PKR candidate, but lost his seat to Tangau, who had returned to the UPKO deputy presidency. He did, however, win the seat of Tamparuli in the Sabah State Legislative Assembly. In 2016 Wilfred Bumburing left PKR for the newly formed Love Sabah Party (PCS) and was elected as its new president.

On 16 February 2024, Wilfred Bumburing returned to the United Progressive Kinabalu Organisation (UPKO) after leaving the party for 12 years.

== Election results ==
Parliament of Malaysia
Year	Constituency	Candidate	Votes	Pct	Opponent(s)	Votes	Pct	Ballots cast	Majority	Turnout
2008	P170 Tuaran	Wilfred Bumburing (UPKO)	17,645	59.72%	Ansari Abdullah (PKR)	11,023	37.31%	30,526	6,622	74.98%
2008	P170 Tuaran	Wilfred Bumburing (UPKO)	17,645	59.72%	Ajin @ Nazin Gagah (IND)	879	2.97%	30,526	6,622	74.98%
2013	P170 Tuaran	Wilfred Bumburing (PKR)	15,495	38.78%	Madius Tangau (UPKO)	20,685	51.77%	40,760	5,190	84.62%
2013	P170 Tuaran	Wilfred Bumburing (PKR)	15,495	38.78%	Erveana Ansari Ali (IND)	2,264	5.67%	40,760	5,190	84.62%
2013	P170 Tuaran	Wilfred Bumburing (PKR)	15,495	38.78%	Samin @ Jasmin Dulin (STAR)	1,509	3.78%	40,760	5,190	84.62%

Sabah State Legislative Assembly
Year	Constituency	Candidate	Votes	Pct	Opponent(s)	Votes	Pct	Ballots cast	Majority	Turnout
1981	N14 Tamparuli	Wilfred Bumburing (PASOK)	441	8.78%	James Peter Ongkili (BERJAYA)	3,503	69.75%	5,022	2,559	81.90%
1981	N14 Tamparuli	Wilfred Bumburing (PASOK)	441	8.78%	Amisah Borhan (USNO)	944	19.80%	5,022	2,559	81.90%
1981	N14 Tamparuli	Wilfred Bumburing (PASOK)	441	8.78%	Mohamed Abdul Rahman (PUSAKA)	47	0.94%	5,022	2,559	81.90%
1985	N10 Tamparuli	Wilfred Bumburing (PBS)	3,222	56.65%	Johnny Lumpisau (BERJAYA)	1,429	25.12%	5,688	1,793	78.30%
1985	N10 Tamparuli	Wilfred Bumburing (PBS)	3,222	56.65%	Aziz Giom (USNO)	809	14.22%	5,688	1,793	78.30%
1985	N10 Tamparuli	Wilfred Bumburing (PBS)	3,222	56.65%	Milton Buja (BERSEPADU)	145	2.55%	5,688	1,793	78.30%
1986	N10 Tamparuli	Wilfred Bumburing (PBS)	4,816	76.27%	Johnny Tanggar (BERJAYA)	1,393	22.06%	6,314	3,423	77.48%
1990	N10 Tamparuli	Wilfred Bumburing (PBS)	4,971	74.77%	James Peter Ongkili (PRS)	748	11.25%	6,648	4,223	81.93%
1990	N10 Tamparuli	Wilfred Bumburing (PBS)	4,971	74.77%	Nori Lumpisau (USNO)	638	9.60%	6,648	4,223	81.93%
1990	N10 Tamparuli	Wilfred Bumburing (PBS)	4,971	74.77%	Mohd Raji Mandaili (AKAR)	144	2.17%	6,648	4,223	81.93%
1990	N10 Tamparuli	Wilfred Bumburing (PBS)	4,971	74.77%	Johnny Tanggar (BERJAYA)	80	1.20%	6,648	4,223	81.93%
1994	N10 Tamparuli	Wilfred Bumburing (PBS)	6,347	81.84%	Mohd Raji Mandaili (AKAR)	1,260	16.25%	7,755	5,087	80.30%
1994	N10 Tamparuli	Wilfred Bumburing (PBS)	6,347	81.84%	Junaidi Indan @ Junaidi Hamdan (IND)	92	1.18%	7,755	5,087	80.30%
1999	N09 Tamparuli	Wilfred Bumburing (UPKO)	3,939	37.15%	Edward Linggu (PBS)	6,125	57.77%	10,603	2,186	78.62%
1999	N09 Tamparuli	Wilfred Bumburing (UPKO)	3,939	37.15%	Monggoh Orow (BERSEKUTU)	475	4.48%	10,603	2,186	78.62%
2013	N09 Tamparuli	Wilfred Bumburing (PKR)	6,862	47.43%	Jahid Jahim (PBS)	6,479	44.78%	14,428	383	83.80%
2013	N09 Tamparuli	Wilfred Bumburing (PKR)	6,862	47.43%	Edward Linggu (STAR)	589	4.07%	14,428	383	83.80%
2013	N09 Tamparuli	Wilfred Bumburing (PKR)	6,862	47.43%	Stephan Gaimin (SAPP)	185	1.28%	14,428	383	83.80%
2013	N09 Tamparuli	Wilfred Bumburing (PKR)	6,862	47.43%	James Ongkili Jr. (IND)	126	0.87%	14,428	383	83.80%
2018	N09 Tamparuli	Wilfred Bumburing (PCS)	2,541	16.59%	Jahid Jahim (PBS)	6,479	44.52%	15,226	2,080	81.30%
2018	N09 Tamparuli	Wilfred Bumburing (PCS)	2,541	16.59%	Dausil Kundayong (PKR)	4,738	30.94%	15,226	2,080	81.30%
2018	N09 Tamparuli	Wilfred Bumburing (PCS)	2,541	16.59%	Jasmin Dulin (STAR)	901	5.88%	15,226	2,080	81.30%

== Honours ==
- Malaysia
  - Commander of the Order of Meritorious Service (PJN) – Datuk (2007)
  - Companion of the Order of Loyalty to the Crown of Malaysia (JSM) (1995)
- Sabah
  - Grand Commander of the Order of Kinabalu (SPDK) – Datuk Seri Panglima (2004)
  - Commander of the Order of Kinabalu (PGDK) – Datuk (1990)
