= Tuaran (federal constituency) =

Federal constituency of Sabah, Malaysia

Tuaran (P170)
Sabah constituency

Federal constituency
- Legislature: Dewan Rakyat
- MP: Wilfred Madius Tangau; GRS
- Constituency created: 1966
- First contested: 1969
- Last contested: 2022

Demographics
- Population (2020): 134,976
- Electors (2025): 88,656
- Area (km²): 1,126
- Pop. density (per km²): 119.9

Tuaran is a federal constituency in West Coast Division (Tuaran District, Kota Kinabalu District and part of Kota Belud District), Sabah, Malaysia, that has been represented in the Dewan Rakyat since 1971.

The federal constituency was created in the 1966 redistribution and is mandated to return a single member to the Dewan Rakyat under the first past the post voting system.

== Demographics ==
https://ge15.orientaldaily.com.my/seats/sabah/p

Ethnic breakdown of Tuaran's electorate as of 2022
1. Sabah Bumiputera (74.1%)
2. Malay-Muslim Bumiputera (16.4%)
3. Chinese (7.50%)
4. Other ethnicities (1.80%)

As of 2020, Tuaran has a population of 134,976 people.

Age breakdown of Tuaran's electorate as of 2022
1. 18-20 (7.75%)
2. 21-29 (22.3%)
3. 30-39 (23.9%)
4. 40-49 (16.9%)
5. 50-59 (13.8%)
6. 60-69 (9.08%)
7. 70-79 (3.59%)
8. 80-89 (1.65%)
9. above 90 (0.98%)
Gender breakdown of Tuaran's electorate as of 2022
1. Male (49.8%)
2. Female (50.2%)

== History ==
=== Polling districts ===
According to the gazette issued on 21 November 2025, the Tuaran constituency has a total of 40 polling districts.

State constituency	Polling Districts	Code	Location
Sulaman (N12）	Penimbawan	170/12/01	SK Penimbawan
Sulaman (N12）	Serusup	170/12/02	SK Serusup
Sulaman (N12）	Kindu	170/12/03	SK Kindu; SMK St. John; SMK Sri Nangka
Sulaman (N12）	Indai	170/12/04	SK Termunong
Sulaman (N12）	Batangan	170/12/05	SK Pekan Tuaran
Sulaman (N12）	Tambalang	170/12/06	SK Tambalang; SK Bolong; SK Laya-Laya
Sulaman (N12）	Baru-Baru	170/12/07	SK Baru-Baru
Pantai Dalit (N13)	Tuaran Bandar	170/13/01	SMK Badin; SM Sains Sabah
Pantai Dalit (N13)	Marabahai	170/13/02	SJK (C) Chen Sin
Pantai Dalit (N13)	Mengkabong	170/13/03	SK Mengkabong
Pantai Dalit (N13)	Berungis	170/13/04	SK Berungis
Pantai Dalit (N13)	Gayang	170/13/05	SK Gayang
Pantai Dalit (N13)	Nongkoulud	170/13/06	SK Nongkolud
Pantai Dalit (N13)	Telipok	170/13/07	SK Pekan Telipok; SK Rugading
Tamparuli (N14）	Tenghilan	170/14/01	SMK Tenghilan
Tamparuli (N14）	Rani	170/14/02	SK Pekan Tenghilan
Tamparuli (N14）	Rungus	170/14/03	SK Rungus
Tamparuli (N14）	Rengalis	170/14/04	SK Wangkod
Tamparuli (N14）	Topokon	170/14/05	SK Topokon
Tamparuli (N14）	Sawah	170/14/06	SMK Sungai Damit
Tamparuli (N14）	Tamparuli	170/14/07	SK Pekan Tamparuli; SMK Tamparuli
Tamparuli (N14）	Mengkaladoi	170/14/08	SJK (C) Chung Hwa Tamparuli; SJK (C) St. Phillip; SK Laputong
Tamparuli (N14）	Gayaratau	170/14/09	SK Gayaratau
Tamparuli (N14）	Kilang Bata	170/14/10	SK Pendidikan Khas Kota Kinabalu
Tamparuli (N14）	Telibong	170/14/11	SK Kauluan
Kiulu (N15)	Rangalau	170/15/01	SK Rangalau Baru
Kiulu (N15)	Kiulu	170/15/02	SMK Tun Fuad Stephens; SK Kitapol; SK Pekan Kiulu
Kiulu (N15)	Malangang	170/15/03	SK Malangang Baru
Kiulu (N15)	Togop	170/15/04	SK Togop
Kiulu (N15)	Kelawat	170/15/05	SK Kelawat; Dewan Serbaguna Kampung Hamad
Kiulu (N15)	Bongol	170/15/06	SK Bongol
Kiulu (N15)	Simpangan	170/15/07	Dewan Pekan Nabalu
Kiulu (N15)	Taginambur	170/15/08	SK Taginambur
Kiulu (N15)	Pukak	170/15/09	SK Pukak
Kiulu (N15)	Mantob	170/15/10	SK Mantob
Kiulu (N15)	Pahu	170/15/11	SK Pahu
Kiulu (N15)	Tiong Simpodon	170/15/12	SK Tiong Perungusan
Kiulu (N15)	Poring	170/15/13	SK Poring
Kiulu (N15)	Tomis	170/15/14	SK Tomis
Kiulu (N15)	Tudan	170/15/15	SK Tudan

=== Representation history ===
Members of Parliament for Tuaran
Parliament	No	Years	Member	Party	Vote Share
Constituency created
		1969-1971	Parliament was suspended		
3rd	P108	1971-1973	Buja Gumbilai	USNO	Uncontested
3rd	P108	1973-1974	Buja Gumbilai	BN (USNO)	Uncontested
4th	P119	1974-1978	Buja Gumbilai	BN (USNO)	6,568; 60.85%
5th	P119	1978-1982	James Peter Ongkili	BN (BERJAYA)	8,166; 69.46%
6th	P119	1982-1986	James Peter Ongkili	BN (BERJAYA)	9,606; 72.19%
7th	P137	1986-1990	Kalakau Untol	BN (USNO)	7,079; 50.12%
8th	P137	1990-1995	Monggoh Orow	GR (PBS)	12,065; 71.15%
9th	P149	1995-1999	Yunof Edward Maringking	GR (PBS)	12,912; 55.53%
10th	P149	1999-2004	Wilfred Madius Tangau	BN (UPKO)	13,083; 55.58%
11th	P170	2004-2008	Wilfred Madius Tangau	BN (UPKO)	17,354; 66.21%
12th	P170	2008-2011	Wilfred Bumburing	BN (UPKO)	17,645; 59.72%
12th	P170	2011-2013	Wilfred Bumburing	Independent	17,645; 59.72%
13th	P170	2013-2018	Wilfred Madius Tangau	BN (UPKO)	20,685; 51.77%
14th	P170	2018	Wilfred Madius Tangau	BN (UPKO)	22,494; 51.54%
14th	P170	2018-2021	Wilfred Madius Tangau	UPKO	22,494; 51.54%
14th	P170	2021–2022	Wilfred Madius Tangau	PH (UPKO)	22,494; 51.54%
15th	P170	2022–2025	Wilfred Madius Tangau	PH (UPKO)	24,493; 42.84%
15th	P170	2025–2026	Wilfred Madius Tangau	UPKO	24,493; 42.84%
15th	P170	2026–present	Wilfred Madius Tangau	GRS (UPKO)	24,493; 42.84%

=== State constituency ===
Parliamentary constituency	State constituency					
Parliamentary constituency	1967–1974	1974–1985	1985–1995	1995–2004	2004–2020	2020–present
Tuaran	Kiulu					
Tuaran						Pantai Dalit
Tuaran	Sulaman					
Tuaran		Tamparuli				

=== Historical boundaries ===
State Constituency	State constituency					
State Constituency	1966	1974	1984	1994	2003	2019
Kiulu	Bundu Tohuri; Kiulu; Mengkaladoi; Nabalu; Tamparuli	Kampung Pukak; Kiulu; Nabalu; Raganan; Simpangan	Kampung Berugis; Kampung Pukak; Kiulu; Nabalu; Simpangan	Bundu Tohori; Kampung Pukak; Kiulu; Nabalu; Taman Wirajaya		Kampung Mangkaladom; Kampung Pukak; Kiulu; Nabalu; Simpangan
Pantai Dalit						Kampung Berungis; Mengkabong; Pantai Dalit; Tuaran; Telipok
Sulaman	Pantai Dalit; Serusup; Sulaman; Tenglihan; Tuaran	Kampung Berugis; Pantai Dalit; Serusup; Sulaman; Tuaran	Kampung Blong; Pantai Dalit; Serusup; Sulaman; Tuaran	Pantai Dalit; Serusup; Sulaman; Tuaran; Telipok	Pantai Dalit; Serusup; Sulaman; Tambalang; Telipok	Batangan; Kampung Bolong; Serusup; Sulaman; Tambalang
Tamparuli		Bundu Tohuri; Mengkaladoi; Sungai Damit; Tamparuli; Tenglihan		Mengkaladoi; Somodon; Sungai Damit; Tamparuli; Tenglihan	Mengkaladoi; Sungai Damit; Tamparuli; Tenglihan; Tuaran	Mengkaladoi; Sungai Damit; Taman Wirajaya; Tamparuli; Tenglihan

=== Current state assembly members ===
No.	State Constituency	Member	Coalition (Party)
N12	Sulaman	Hajiji Noor	GRS (GAGASAN)
N13	Pantai Dalit	Jasnih Daya	GRS (GAGASAN)
N14	Tamparuli	Wilfred Madius Tangau	GRS (UPKO)
N15	Kiulu	Joniston Bangkuai	GRS (PBS)

=== Local governments & postcodes ===
No.	State Constituency	Local Government	Postcode
N12	Sulaman	Tuaran District Council	89150 Kota Belud; 89200 Kota Kinabalu; 89200 Tuaran; 89250 Tamparuli; 89260 Tenghilan
N13	Pantai Dalit	Kota Kinabalu City Hall (Telipok area); Tuaran District Council	89150 Kota Belud; 89200 Kota Kinabalu; 89200 Tuaran; 89250 Tamparuli; 89260 Tenghilan
N14	Tamparuli	Tuaran District Council	89150 Kota Belud; 89200 Kota Kinabalu; 89200 Tuaran; 89250 Tamparuli; 89260 Tenghilan
N15	Kiulu	Tuaran District Council; Kota Belud District Council (Nabalu and Taginambur areas)	89150 Kota Belud; 89200 Kota Kinabalu; 89200 Tuaran; 89250 Tamparuli; 89260 Tenghilan

== Election results ==
Malaysian general election, 2022
Party	Candidate	Votes	%	∆%
PH	Wilfred Madius Tangau	24,943	42.84	▲42.84
GRS	Joniston Bangkuai	24,710	42.44	▲42.44
Heritage	Jo-Anna Sue Henley Rampas	5,728	9.84	▲9.84
Independent	Noortaip Suhaili	2,008	3.49	▲3.49
PEJUANG	Muminin Norbinsha	445	0.76	▲0.76
Independent	Boby Lewat	393	0.67	▲0.67
Total valid votes		58,227	100.00	
Total rejected ballots		746		
Unreturned ballots		149		
Turnout		59,122	70.87	▼11.55
Registered electors		83,419		
Majority		233	0.40	▼17.07
PH gain from BN		Swing		?
Source(s) https://lom.agc.gov.my/ilims/upload/portal/akta/outputp/1753262/PUB619_2022.pdf

Malaysian general election, 2018
Party	Candidate	Votes	%	∆%
BN	Madius Tangau	22,494	51.54	▼0.23
PKR	Chrisnadia Sinam	14,870	34.07	▼4.71
Love Sabah Party	Kalakau @ Kalakan Untol @ Entol	2,611	5.98	▲5.98
Sabah People's Hope Party	Syra Peter @ P Gom	2,311	5.30	▲5.30
PAS	Paumin @ Mohd Aminuddin Aling	1,357	3.11	▲3.11
Total valid votes		43,643	100.00	
Total rejected ballots		958		
Unreturned ballots		233		
Turnout		44,834	82.42	▼2.20
Registered electors		54,400		
Majority		7,624	17.47	▲4.48
BN hold		Swing		
Source(s) "His Majesty's Government Gazette - Notice of Contested Election, Parliament for the State of Sabah [P.U. (B) 246/2018]" (PDF). Attorney General's Chambers of Malaysia. 3 May 2018. "Federal Government Gazette - Results of Contested Election and Statements of the Poll after the Official Addition of Votes, Parliamentary Constituencies for the State of Sabah [P.U. (B) 320/2018]" (PDF). Attorney General's Chambers of Malaysia. 28 May 2018.

Malaysian general election, 2013
Party	Candidate	Votes	%	∆%
BN	Madius Tangau	20,685	51.77	▼7.95
PKR	Mojilip Bumburing @ Wilfred	15,495	38.78	▲1.47
Independent	Erveana Ansari Ali	2,264	5.67	▲5.67
STAR	Samin @ Jasmin Dulin	1,509	3.78	▲3.78
Total valid votes		39,953	100.00	
Total rejected ballots		807		
Unreturned ballots		89		
Turnout		40,849	84.62	▲9.64
Registered electors		48,276		
Majority		5,190	12.99	▼9.42
BN hold		Swing		
Source(s) "Federal Government Gazette - Notice of Contested Election, Parliament for the State of Sabah [P.U. (B) 183/2013]" (PDF). Attorney General's Chambers of Malaysia. 26 April 2013. "Federal Government Gazette - Results of Contested Election and Statements of the Poll after the Official Addition of Votes, Parliamentary Constituencies for the State of Sabah [P.U. (B) 224/2013]" (PDF). Attorney General's Chambers of Malaysia. 22 May 2013.

Malaysian general election, 2008
Party	Candidate	Votes	%	∆%
BN	Mojilip Bumburing @ Wilfred	17,645	59.72	▼6.41
PKR	Umsery @ Ansari Abdullah	11,023	37.31	▲3.52
Independent	Ajin @ Nazin Gagah	879	2.97	▲2.97
Total valid votes		29,547	100.00	
Total rejected ballots		979		
Unreturned ballots		37		
Turnout		30,563	74.98	▲5.84
Registered electors		40,761		
Majority		6,622	22.41	▼10.01
BN hold		Swing		

Malaysian general election, 2004
Party	Candidate	Votes	%	∆%
BN	Madius Tangau	17,354	66.21	▲10.63
PKR	Umsery @ Ansari Abdullah	8,855	33.79	▲33.79
Total valid votes		26,209	100.00	
Total rejected ballots		981		
Unreturned ballots		8		
Turnout		27,198	69.14	▲3.26
Registered electors		39,337		
Majority		8,499	32.42	▲20.47
BN hold		Swing		

Malaysian general election, 1999
Party	Candidate	Votes	%	∆%
BN	Madius Tangau	13,083	55.58	▲11.11
PBS	Yunof Edward Maringking	10,270	43.63	▼11.90
Independent	Rubiah F. Ayid	185	0.79	▲0.79
Total valid votes		23,538	100.00	
Total rejected ballots		207		
Unreturned ballots		28		
Turnout		23,773	65.88	▼6.85
Registered electors		36,085		
Majority		2,813	11.95	▲0.89
BN gain from PBS		Swing		?

Malaysian general election, 1995
Party	Candidate	Votes	%	∆%
PBS	Yunof Edward Maringking	12,912	55.53	▼15.62
BN	Monggoh Orow	10,342	44.47	▲44.47
Total valid votes		23,254	100.00	
Total rejected ballots		271		
Unreturned ballots		27		
Turnout		23,552	72.73	▲10.35
Registered electors		32,382		
Majority		2,570	11.06	▼31.24
PBS hold		Swing		

Malaysian general election, 1990
Party	Candidate	Votes	%	∆%
PBS	Monggoh Orow	12,065	71.15	▲71.15
AKAR	Ubing Pangiran @ David	4,891	28.85	▲28.85
Total valid votes		16,956	100.00	
Total rejected ballots		140		
Unreturned ballots		0		
Turnout		17,096	62.38	▲0.61
Registered electors		27,405		
Majority		7,174	42.30	▲24.30
PBS gain from BN		Swing		?

Malaysian general election, 1986
Party	Candidate	Votes	%	∆%
BN	Kalakau Untol	7,079	50.12	▼22.07
Independent	Monggoh Orow	4,536	32.12	▲32.12
BERJAYA	Umsery @ Ansari Abdullah	2,164	15.32	▲15.32
Independent	Geoffrey Gaban	344	2.40	▲2.40
Total valid votes		14,123	100.00	
Total rejected ballots		116		
Unreturned ballots		0		
Turnout		14,239	61.77	▼6.97
Registered electors		23,050		
Majority		2,543	18.00	▼32.07
BN hold		Swing		

Malaysian general election, 1982
Party	Candidate	Votes	%	∆%
BN	James Peter Ongkili	9,606	72.19	▲2.73
PASOK	James Arab	2,944	22.12	▲22.12
Independent	Madrus Yunus	485	3.64	▲3.64
PUSAKA	Alim Sugara	272	2.04	▼28.4
Total valid votes		13,307	100.00	
Total rejected ballots		261		
Unreturned ballots		0		
Turnout		13,568	68.74	▼1.83
Registered electors		19,739		
Majority		6,662	50.07	▲11.15
BN hold		Swing		

Malaysian general election, 1978
Party	Candidate	Votes	%	∆%
BN	James Peter Ongkili	8,166	69.46	▲8.61
PUSAKA	Mohamed Abdul Rahman	3,591	30.54	▲30.54
Total valid votes		11,757	100.00	
Total rejected ballots		316		
Unreturned ballots		0		
Turnout		12,073	70.57	▼7.15
Registered electors		17,109		
Majority		4,575	38.92	▲17.22
BN hold		Swing		

Malaysian general election, 1974
Party	Candidate	Votes	%	∆%
BN	Buja Gumbilai	6,468	60.85	▲60.85
PEKEMAS	Mohamed Abdul Rahman	4,162	39.15	▲39.15
Total valid votes		10,630	100.00	
Total rejected ballots		439		
Unreturned ballots		0		
Turnout		11,069	77.72	
Registered electors		14,242		
Majority		2,306	21.70	
BN gain from USNO		Swing		?

Malaysian general election, 1969
Party	Candidate	Votes	%	∆%
On the nomination day, Buja Gumbilai won uncontested.
USNO	Buja Gumbilai			
Total valid votes			100.00	
Total rejected ballots				
Unreturned ballots				
Turnout				
Registered electors		13,826		
Majority				
This was a new constituency created.
