= Tamparuli (state constituency) =

Tamparuli (N14)
Sabah constituency

State constituency
- Legislature: Sabah State Legislative Assembly
MLA
Wilfred Madius Tangau
GRS
- Constituency created: 1976
- First contested: 1976
- Last contested: 2025

Demographics
- Electors (2025): 26,767

Tamparuli is a state constituency in Sabah, Malaysia, that has been represented in the Sabah State Legislative Assembly. It is mandated to return a single member to the Assembly under the first-past-the-post voting system.

== Polling districts ==
As at 24 September 2019, this constituency contains the polling districts of Tenghilan, Rani, Rungus, Rongolis, Topokon, Sawah, Tamparuli, Mangkaladoi, Gayaratau, Kilang Bata and Telibong.

== Demographics ==
As of 2020, Tamparuli has a population of 40,502 people.

Ethnic breakdown of Tamparuli's electorate as of 2025
1. Non-Muslim Bumiputera (69.0%)
2. Muslim Bumiputera (24.0%)
3. Chinese (6.50%)
4. Other ethnicities (0.50%)

== History ==
=== Polling districts ===
According to the gazette issued on 31 October 2022, the Tamparuli constituency has a total of 11 polling districts.

State constituency	Polling Districts	Code	Location
Tamparuli (N14）	Tenghilan	170/14/01	SMK Tenghilan
Tamparuli (N14）	Rani	170/14/02	SK Pekan Tenghilan
Tamparuli (N14）	Rungus	170/14/03	SK Rungus
Tamparuli (N14）	Rongolis	170/14/04	SK Wangkod
Tamparuli (N14）	Topokon	170/14/05	SK Topokon
Tamparuli (N14）	Sawah	170/14/06	SMK Sungai Damit
Tamparuli (N14）	Tamparuli	170/14/07	SK Pekan Tamparuli; SMK Tamparuli
Tamparuli (N14）	Mangkaladoi	170/14/08	SJK (C) Chung Hwa Tamparuli; SJK (C) St. Phillip
Tamparuli (N14）	Gayaratau	170/14/09	SK Gayaratau
Tamparuli (N14）	Kilang Bata	170/14/10	SK Pendidikan Khas Kota Kinabalu
Tamparuli (N14）	Telibong	170/14/11	SK Kauluan

=== Representation history ===
Member of Sabah State Legislative Assembly for Tamparuli
Assembly	No	Years	Member	Party
Constituency created from Sulaman and Kiulu
5th	N14	1976–1981	James Peter Ongkili	BERJAYA
6th	N14	1981–1983	James Peter Ongkili	BN (BERJAYA)
6th	N14	1983–1985	Clarence Elong Mansul	BN (BERJAYA)
7th	N10	1985–1986	Wilfred Bumburing	PBS
8th	N10	1986–1990	Wilfred Bumburing	PBS
9th	N10	1990–1994	Wilfred Bumburing	GR (PBS)
10th	N10	1994	Wilfred Bumburing	GR (PBS)
10th	N10	1994–1999	Wilfred Bumburing	BN (PDS)
11th	N09	1999–2002	Edward Linggu	PBS
11th	N09	2002–2004	Edward Linggu	BN (PBS)
12th	N09	2004–2008	Jahid Jahim	BN (PBS)
13th	N09	2008–2013	Jahid Jahim	BN (PBS)
14th	N09	2013–2016	Wilfred Bumburing	PKR
14th	N09	2016–2018	Wilfred Bumburing	PCS
15th	N09	2018	Jahid Jahim	BN (PBS)
15th	N09	2018–2020	Jahid Jahim	PBS
16th	N14	2020–2025	Jahid Jahim	GRS (PBS)
17th	N14	2025–2026	Wilfred Madius Tangau	UPKO
17th	N14	2026–present	Wilfred Madius Tangau	GRS (UPKO)

== Election results ==
Sabah state election, 2025
Party	Candidate	Votes	%	∆%
UPKO	Wilfred Madius Tangau	8,247	44.86	▲44.86
GRS	Bonaventure Boniface	5,691	30.96	▲30.96
Homeland Solidarity Party	Jinitoh Sontori	1,399	7.61	▲7.61
Heritage	Joseph Lee Han Kyun	1,082	5.89	▲5.89
KDM	Gaim James Lunkapis	697	3.79	▲3.89
Independent	Vun Yun Fook	377	2.05	▲2.05
Independent	Johan Jahid	258	1.40	▲1.40
Sabah Dream Party	Julia Ongkili	238	1.29	▲1.29
Independent	Raymond Alfred	229	1.25	▲1.25
Sabah Clan Party	Aliusus Sipil @ Abdul Aziz	88	0.48	▲0.48
Sabah Native Co-operation Party	Arthur Erik Lee	33	0.18	▲0.18
Independent	Andrew Mali	30	0.16	▲0.16
Independent	Razali Koroh	14	0.08	▲0.08
Total valid votes		18,383		
Total rejected ballots		222		
Unreturned ballots		38		
Turnout		18,643	69.65	▼15.28
Registered electors		26,767		
Majority		2,556	13.90	▼16.03
UPKO gain from PBS		Swing		?
Source(s) "RESULTS OF CONTESTED ELECTION AND STATEMENTS OF THE POLL AFTER THE OFFICIAL ADDITION OF VOTES" (PDF).

Sabah state election, 2020
Party	Candidate	Votes	%	∆%
PBS	Jahid Jahim	6,843	58.24	▲58.24
PKR	Alijus @ Mohd Ali Sipil	3,326	28.31	▼2.63
Love Sabah Party	Denis Gimpah	1,001	8.52	▼8.07
LDP	Raymond Alfred @ Jenry	377	3.21	▲3.21
Total valid votes		11,547	98.27	
Total rejected ballots		173	1.47	
Unreturned ballots		30	0.26	
Turnout		11,750	84.93	▲3.63
Registered electors		16,597		
Majority		3,517	29.93	▲16.35
PBS gain from BN		Swing		?
Source(s) "RESULTS OF CONTESTED ELECTION AND STATEMENTS OF THE POLL AFTER THE OFFICIAL ADDITION OF VOTES".

Sabah state election, 2018
Party	Candidate	Votes	%	∆%
BN	Jahid Jahim	6,818	44.52	▼0.26
PKR	Dausil Kundayong	4,738	30.94	▼16.49
Love Sabah Party	Wilfred Bumburing	2,541	16.59	▲16.59
STAR	Jasmin Dulin	901	5.88	▲1.81
Total valid votes		14,998	97.94	
Total rejected ballots		228	1.49	
Unreturned ballots		87	0.57	
Turnout		15,313	81.30	▼2.50
Registered electors		18,836		
Majority		2,080	13.58	▲10.93
BN gain from PKR		Swing		?
Source(s) "RESULTS OF CONTESTED ELECTION AND STATEMENTS OF THE POLL AFTER THE OFFICIAL ADDITION OF VOTES".

Sabah state election, 2013
Party	Candidate	Votes	%	∆%
PKR	Wilfred Bumburing	6,862	47.43	▲11.96
BN	Jahid Jahim	6,479	44.78	▼16.21
STAR	Edward Linggu	589	4.07	▲4.07
SAPP	Stephan Gaimin	185	1.28	▲1.28
Independent	James Ongkili Jr.	126	0.87	▲0.87
Total valid votes		14,241	98.42	
Total rejected ballots		187	1.29	
Unreturned ballots		41	0.28	
Turnout		14,469	83.80	▲11.48
Registered electors		17,265		
Majority		383	2.65	▼22.87
PKR gain from BN		Swing		?
Source(s) "KEPUTUSAN PILIHAN RAYA UMUM DEWAN UNDANGAN NEGERI".

Sabah state election, 2008
Party	Candidate	Votes	%	∆%
BN	Jahid Jahim	6,568	60.99	▼7.67
PKR	Henry Misun	3,825	35.47	▲26.82
Independent	Silim Yamin	188	1.74	▲1.74
Total valid votes		10,581	98.11	
Total rejected ballots		204	1.89	
Unreturned ballots		0	0.00	
Turnout		10,785	72.32	▲5.25
Registered electors		14,912		
Majority		2,743	25.52	▼32.83
BN hold		Swing		
Source(s) "KEPUTUSAN PILIHAN RAYA UMUM DEWAN UNDANGAN NEGERI SABAH BAGI TAHUN 2008".

Sabah state election, 2004
Party	Candidate	Votes	%	∆%
BN	Jahid Jahim	6,775	68.66	▲10.89
Independent	Hannis Gibung	1,017	10.31	▲10.31
PKR	Rosnah @ Rose Onek	854	8.65	▲8.65
Independent	Fabian Anuar Mail	515	5.22	▲5.22
BERSEKUTU	Edwin Siagian	478	4.84	▲0.36
Total valid votes		9,639	97.68	
Total rejected ballots		229	2.32	
Unreturned ballots		0	0.00	
Turnout		9,868	67.07	▼11.55
Registered electors		14,712		
Majority		5,758	58.35	▲37.73
BN gain from PBS		Swing		?
Source(s) "KEPUTUSAN PILIHAN RAYA UMUM DEWAN UNDANGAN NEGERI SABAH BAGI TAHUN 2004".

Sabah state election, 1999
Party	Candidate	Votes	%	∆%
PBS	Edward Linggu	6,125	57.77	▼24.07
BN	Wilfred Bumburing	3,939	37.15	▲20.90
BERSEKUTU	Monggoh Orow	475	4.48	▲4.48
Total valid votes		10,539	99.40	
Total rejected ballots		64	0.60	
Unreturned ballots		0	0.00	
Turnout		10,603	78.62	▼1.68
Registered electors		13,487		
Majority		2,186	20.62	▼44.97
PBS hold		Swing		
Source(s) "KEPUTUSAN PILIHAN RAYA UMUM DEWAN UNDANGAN NEGERI SABAH BAGI TAHUN 1999".

Sabah state election, 1994
Party	Candidate	Votes	%	∆%
PBS	Wilfred Bumburing	6,347	81.84	▲7.07
BN	Mohd Raji Mandaili	1,260	16.25	▲16.25
Independent	Junaidi Indan @ Junaidi Hamdan	92	1.18	▲1.18
Total valid votes		7,699	99.28	
Total rejected ballots		56	0.72	
Unreturned ballots		0	0.00	
Turnout		7,755	80.30	▼1.63
Registered electors		9,658		
Majority		5,087	65.59	▲2.07
PBS hold		Swing		
Source(s) "KEPUTUSAN PILIHAN RAYA UMUM DEWAN UNDANGAN NEGERI SABAH BAGI TAHUN 1994".

Sabah state election, 1990
Party	Candidate	Votes	%	∆%
PBS	Wilfred Bumburing	4,971	74.77	▼1.50
PRS	James Peter Ongkili	748	11.25	▲11.25
USNO	Nori Lumpisau	638	9.60	▲9.60
AKAR	Mohd Raji Mandaili	144	2.17	▲2.17
BERJAYA	Johnny Tanggar	80	1.20	▼20.86
Total valid votes		6,581	98.99	
Total rejected ballots		67	1.01	
Unreturned ballots		0	0.00	
Turnout		6,648	81.93	▲4.45
Registered electors		8,114		
Majority		4,223	63.52	▲9.31
PBS hold		Swing		
Source(s) "KEPUTUSAN PILIHAN RAYA UMUM DEWAN UNDANGAN NEGERI SABAH BAGI TAHUN 1990".

Sabah state election, 1986
Party	Candidate	Votes	%	∆%
PBS	Wilfred Bumburing	4,816	76.27	▲19.62
BERJAYA	Johnny Tanggar @ Johnnie	1,393	22.06	▼3.06
Total valid votes		6,209	98.34	
Total rejected ballots		105	1.66	
Unreturned ballots		0	0.00	
Turnout		6,314	77.48	▼0.82
Registered electors		8,149		
Majority		3,423	54.21	▲22.68
PBS hold		Swing		
Source(s) "KEPUTUSAN PILIHAN RAYA UMUM DEWAN UNDANGAN NEGERI SABAH BAGI TAHUN 1986".

Sabah state election, 1985
Party	Candidate	Votes	%	∆%
PBS	Wilfred Bumburing	3,222	56.65	▲56.65
BERJAYA	Johnny Lumpisau	1,429	25.12	▼44.63
USNO	Aziz Giom	809	14.22	▼5.58
BERSEPADU	Milton Buja	145	2.55	▲2.55
Total valid votes		5,605	98.54	
Total rejected ballots		83	1.46	
Unreturned ballots		0	0.00	
Turnout		5,688	78.30	▼3.60
Registered electors		7,264		
Majority		1,793	31.53	▼18.42
PBS gain from BERJAYA		Swing		?

Sabah state election, 1981
Party	Candidate	Votes	%	∆%
BERJAYA	James Peter Ongkili	3,503	69.75	▲3.44
USNO	Amisah Borhan	944	19.80	▼9.00
PASOK	Wilfred Bumburing	441	8.78	▲8.78
PUSAKA	Mohamed Abdul Rahman	47	0.94	▲0.94
Total valid votes		4,935	98.27	
Total rejected ballots		87	1.73	
Unreturned ballots		0	0.00	
Turnout		5,022	81.90	▼1.83
Registered electors		6,135		
Majority		2,559	49.95	▲11.84
BERJAYA hold		Swing		

Sabah state election, 1976
Party	Candidate	Votes	%
BERJAYA	James Peter Ongkili	2,775	66.31
USNO	Jasnie Gindug	1,180	28.20
Independent	Maria Gontuong	151	3.61
USPO	Jemis Arab	25	0.60
Total valid votes		4,131	98.71
Total rejected ballots		54	1.29
Unreturned ballots		0	0.00
Turnout		4,185	83.73
Registered electors		4,998	
Majority		1,595	38.11
This was a new constituency created.
