= Jahid Jahim =

Malaysian politician

Yang Berbahagia Datuk Seri Panglima Jahid Jahim SPDK PGDK JMN ASDK KMN ADK
- جاهد زعيم

State Minister of Rural Development of Sabah
- In office 29 September 2020 – 30 November 2025
- Governor: Juhar Mahiruddin (2020–2024); Musa Aman (since 2025)
- Chief Minister: Hajiji Noor
- Assistant: Harun Durabi (2020–2023); Samad Jambri (since 2020); Ruddy Awah (since 2023)
- Preceded by: Ewon Benedick
- Constituency: Tamparuli

State Minister of Housing and Local Government of Sabah
- In office 11 May 2018 – 12 May 2018
- Governor: Juhar Mahiruddin
- Chief Minister: Musa Aman
- Preceded by: Hajiji Noor
- Succeeded by: Jaujan Sambakong
- Constituency: Tamparuli

State Assistant Minister of Youth and Sports of Sabah
- In office 27 March 2004 – 10 May 2013
- Governor: Ahmadshah Abdullah (2004–2010); Juhar Mahiruddin (2011–2013)
- Chief Minister: Musa Aman
- Minister: Masidi Manjun (2004–2008); Peter Pang En Yin (2008–2013)
- Preceded by: Surady Kayong
- Succeeded by: Masiung Banah
- Constituency: Tamparuli

Deputy President of the United Sabah Party (Muslim Bumiputera) (Acting: 4 January 2021–30 June 2022)
- Incumbent
- Assumed office 4 January 2021 Serving with Radin Malleh (Non-Muslim Bumiputera, 2021–2022) & Joachim Gunsalam (Non-Muslim Bumiputera, 2022–2024) & Yee Moh Chai (Chinese)
- President: Maximus Ongkili (2021–2024); Joachim Gunsalam (since 2024)
- Preceded by: Jamilah Sulaiman

Member of the Sabah State Legislative Assembly for Tamparuli
- In office 9 May 2018 – 29 November 2025
- Preceded by: Wilfred Bumburing (PR–PKR)
- Succeeded by: Yang Berhormat Datuk Seri Panglima Wilfred Madius Tangau
- Majority: 2,080 (2018); 3,517 (2020)
- In office 21 March 2004 – 5 May 2013
- Preceded by: Edward Linggu (PBS)
- Succeeded by: Wilfred Bumburing (PR–PKR)
- Majority: 5,758 (2004); 2,743 (2008)

Faction represented in the Sabah State Legislative Assembly
- 2004–2013, 2018: Barisan Nasional
- 2018–2020: United Sabah Party
- 2020–: Gabungan Rakyat Sabah

Personal details
- Born: Jahid bin Jahim; 29 May 1958 (age 68) Kg. Rangalau Kiulu, Tamparuli, Tuaran, Crown Colony of North Borneo (now Sabah, Malaysia)
- Citizenship: Malaysia
- Party: United Sabah Party (PBS)
- Other political affiliations: Barisan Nasional (BN) (2002–2018); United Alliance of Sabah (GBS) (2018–2020); Gabungan Rakyat Sabah (GRS) (since 2020)
- Education: National University of Malaysia
- Occupation: Politician

Jahid Jahim (born 29 May 1958) is a Malaysian politician who has served as the State Minister of Rural Development of Sabah in the Gabungan Rakyat Sabah (GRS) state administration under Chief Minister Hajiji Noor since September 2020 and Member of the Sabah State Legislative Assembly (MLA) for Tamparuli since May 2018 until November 2025 and from March 2004 to May 2013. He also served as State Minister of Housing and Local Government of Sabah in May 2018 and State Assistant Minister of Youth and Sports of Sabah from March 2004 to May 2013. He is a member of the United Sabah Party (PBS), a component party of the GRS coalition. He has served as the Deputy President of PBS for the Muslim Bumiputera quota since January 2021 and previously served as the Secretary-General of PBS prior to his promotion as Acting Deputy President. He had previously contested in the elections as a direct candidate of another ruling Barisan Nasional (BN) coalition before PBS decided to leave BN on 12 May 2018.

== Election results ==
Sabah State Legislative Assembly
Year	Constituency	Candidate	Votes	Pct	Opponent(s)	Votes	Pct	Ballots cast	Majority	Turnout
1990	N11 Sulaman	Jahid Jahim (PBS)	3,294	40.46%	Hajiji Noor (USNO)	3,575	43.91%	8,202	281	80.02%
1990	N11 Sulaman	Jahid Jahim (PBS)	3,294	40.46%	Kalakau Untol (AKAR)	565	6.94%	8,202	281	80.02%
1990	N11 Sulaman	Jahid Jahim (PBS)	3,294	40.46%	Aliasgar Basri (BERJAYA)	538	6.61%	8,202	281	80.02%
1990	N11 Sulaman	Jahid Jahim (PBS)	3,294	40.46%	Shafie Anterak (PRS)	120	1.47%	8,202	281	80.02%
1990	N11 Sulaman	Jahid Jahim (PBS)	3,294	40.46%	Yusof Awang Ludin (IND)	38	0.47%	8,202	281	80.02%
1990	N11 Sulaman	Jahid Jahim (PBS)	3,294	40.46%	Laugan Tarki Noor (IND)	11	0.14%	8,202	281	80.02%
2004	N09 Tamparuli	Jahid Jahim (PBS)	6,775	70.28%	Hannis Gibung (IND)	1,017	10.55%	9,868	5,758	67.07%
2004	N09 Tamparuli	Jahid Jahim (PBS)	6,775	70.28%	Rosnah Onek (PKR)	854	8.86%	9,868	5,758	67.07%
2004	N09 Tamparuli	Jahid Jahim (PBS)	6,775	70.28%	Fabian Anuar Mail (IND)	516	5.35%	9,868	5,758	67.07%
2004	N09 Tamparuli	Jahid Jahim (PBS)	6,775	70.28%	Stephan Gamin (BERSEKUTU)	478	4.96%	9,868	5,758	67.07%
2008	N09 Tamparuli	Jahid Jahim (PBS)	6,568	62.07%	Henry Misun (PKR)	3,825	36.15%	10,785	2,743	72.32%
2008	N09 Tamparuli	Jahid Jahim (PBS)	6,568	62.07%	Silim Yamin (IND)	188	1.78%	10,785	2,743	72.32%
2013	N09 Tamparuli	Jahid Jahim (PBS)	6,479	45.50%	Wilfred Bumburing (PKR)	6,862	48.18%	14,428	383	83.80%
2013	N09 Tamparuli	Jahid Jahim (PBS)	6,479	45.50%	Edward Linggu (STAR)	589	4.14%	14,428	383	83.80%
2013	N09 Tamparuli	Jahid Jahim (PBS)	6,479	45.50%	Stephan Gamin (SAPP)	185	1.30%	14,428	383	83.80%
2013	N09 Tamparuli	Jahid Jahim (PBS)	6,479	45.50%	James Ongkili Jr. (IND)	126	0.88%	14,428	383	83.80%
2018	N09 Tamparuli	Jahid Jahim (PBS)	6,818	45.46%	Dausil Kundayong (PKR)	4,738	31.59%	15,313	2,080	81.30%
2018	N09 Tamparuli	Jahid Jahim (PBS)	6,818	45.46%	Wilfred Bumburing (PCS)	2,541	16.94%	15,313	2,080	81.30%
2018	N09 Tamparuli	Jahid Jahim (PBS)	6,818	45.46%	Jasmin Dulin (STAR)	901	6.01%	15,313	2,080	81.30%
2020	N14 Tamparuli	Jahid Jahim (PBS)	6,843	59.26%	Alijus @ Mohd Ali Sipil (PKR)	3,326	28.81%	11,547	3,517	69.58%
2020	N14 Tamparuli	Jahid Jahim (PBS)	6,843	59.26%	Denis Gimpah (PCS)	1,001	8.67%	11,547	3,517	69.58%
2020	N14 Tamparuli	Jahid Jahim (PBS)	6,843	59.26%	Raymond Alfred @ Jenry (LDP)	377	3.26%	11,547	3,517	69.58%

== Honours ==
- Malaysia
  - Companion of the Order of the Defender of the Realm (JMN) (2015)
  - Officer of the Order of the Defender of the Realm (KMN) (2006)
- Sabah
  - Grand Commander of the Order of Kinabalu (SPDK) – Datuk Seri Panglima (2025)
  - Commander of the Order of Kinabalu (PGDK) – Datuk (2008)
  - Companion of the Order of Kinabalu (ASDK) (1994)
  - Member of the Order of Kinabalu (ADK) (1981)
