= Wilfred Madius Tangau =

Malaysian politician

Yang Berhormat Datuk Seri Panglima Wilfred Madius Tangau SPDK JSM MP MLA JP
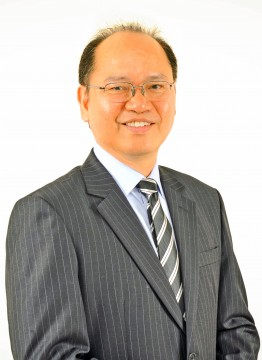

Deputy Chief Minister of Sabah I
- In office 16 May 2018 – 29 September 2020 Serving with: Jaujan Sambakong (Deputy Chief Minister II) &; Christina Liew Chin Jin (Deputy Chief Minister III)
- Governor: Juhar Mahiruddin
- Chief Minister: Shafie Apdal
- Preceded by: Jeffrey Kitingan
- Succeeded by: Bung Moktar Radin
- Constituency: Nominated MLA (UPKO)

Minister of Science, Technology and Innovation
- In office 29 July 2015 – 9 May 2018
- Monarchs: Abdul Halim (2015–2016); Muhammad V (2016–2018)
- Prime Minister: Najib Razak
- Deputy: Abu Bakar Mohamad Diah
- Preceded by: Ewon Ebin
- Succeeded by: Yeo Bee Yin (Minister of Energy, Technology, Science, Climate Change and Environment)

Member of the Sabah State Legislative Assembly for Tamparuli
- Incumbent
- Assumed office 29 November 2025
- Preceded by: Jahid Jahim (GRS–PBS)
- Majority: 2,556 (2025)

Nominated Member of the Sabah State Legislative Assembly
- In office 20 September 2018 – 30 July 2020 Serving with: Jaffari Waliam &; Loretto Padua Jr &; Terrence Siambun &; Stephen Wong Tien Fatt (until 2019) &; Ronnie Loh Ee Eng (2019–2020)
- Chief Minister: Shafie Apdal

Member of the Malaysian Parliament for Tuaran
- Incumbent
- Assumed office 5 May 2013
- Preceded by: Wilfred Bumburing (BN–UPKO)
- Majority: 5,190 (2013); 7,624 (2018); 233 (2022)
- In office 29 December 1999 – 8 March 2008
- Preceded by: Yunof Edward Maringking (BN–PBS)
- Succeeded by: Wilfred Bumburing (BN–UPKO)
- Majority: 2,813 (1999); 8,499 (2004)

2nd Honorary President of the United Progressive Kinabalu Organisation
- Incumbent
- Assumed office 15 January 2023
- President: Ewon Benedick
- Preceded by: Bernard Giluk Dompok

2nd President of the United Progressive Kinabalu Organisation
- In office 9 April 2014 – 17 November 2022 (Acting: 22 March 2014 – 24 September 2019)
- Deputy: Donald Peter Mojuntin
- Preceded by: Bernard Giluk Dompok
- Succeeded by: Ewon Benedick

Faction represented in Dewan Rakyat
- 1999–2008: Barisan Nasional
- 2013–2018: Barisan Nasional
- 2018–2019: United Pasokmomogun Kadazandusun Murut Organisation
- 2019–2021, Since 2025: United Progressive Kinabalu Organisation
- 2021–2025: Pakatan Harapan

Faction represented in the Sabah State Legislative Assembly
- 2018–2019: United Pasokmomogun Kadazandusun Murut Organisation
- 2019–2020, Since 2025: United Progressive Kinabalu Organisation

Personal details
- Born: Madius bin Tangau; 13 March 1958 (age 68) Kiulu, Tuaran, North Borneo (now Sabah, Malaysia)
- Citizenship: Malaysia
- Party: United Progressive Kinabalu Organisation (UPKO)
- Other political affiliations: Barisan Nasional (BN) (1999–2018); Pakatan Harapan (PH) (2021–2026); Gabungan Rakyat Sabah (GRS) (since 2026)
- Spouse: Jaina Sintian
- Children: 5
- Education: SMS Selangor; Setapak High School
- Alma mater: University Pertanian Malaysia; Asian Institute of Management
- Occupation: Politician
- Profession: Forester
- Website: madiustangau.com
- Wilfred Madius Tangau on Facebook; Wilfred Madius Tangau on Parliament of Malaysia

Madius bin Tangau, commonly known as Wilfred Madius Tangau (born 13 March 1958) is a Malaysian politician who has served as the Member of Parliament (MP) for Tuaran from November 1999 to March 2008 and again since May 2013, and concurrently serves as a Member of the Sabah State Legislative Assembly for Tamparuli since November 2025. He served as the Deputy Chief Minister I and State Minister of Trade and Industry of Sabah in the Sabah Heritage Party (WARISAN) state administration under Chief Minister Shafie Apdal from May 2018 to the collapse of the WARISAN state administration in September 2020 from May 2018 to the collapse of the WARISAN administration in September 2020. Previously, he served as the Minister of Science, Technology and Innovation under Prime Minister Najib Razak from July 2015 to May 2018. He is a member of the United Progressive Kinabalu Organisation (UPKO), formerly a component party of the Barisan Nasional (BN) and Pakatan Harapan (PH) coalitions. He has served as the Honorary President of UPKO since January 2023, second President of UPKO from March 2014 to January 2023, when he served in the official capacity from September 2018 to January 2023 and acting capacity from March 2014 following the resignation of Bernard Giluk Dompok to his official assumption of UPKO presidency in September 2018.

== Early life ==
Tangau was born in 1958 in Kampung Lokos, Kiulu, Tuaran, Sabah, into a Kadazan-Dusun family of peasants cum agrarian pastoralists whereby his parents, Peter Yanggau Gokis (born 26 March 1924) and Anna Bolugu Panod (11 August 1932–19 January 2025) were cultivators of hill paddy. He is the fourth child of 14 siblings (two deceased). Upon completing his primary school education at SRK Lokos, Kiulu in 1970, he was determined to continue his education despite initial objections from his parents due to financial constraints.

With his own savings, he enrolled in SMK Kiulu (now known as SMK Tun Fuad Stephens) and attended from Bridge Class to Form Two. To support himself in school, he took up a manual job as a rubber tapper on weekends. He was also employed by a Chinese “towkay”, a term for business owners in Kiulu town, which at that time only had a row of shops. He then could save on his pocket money for food as well as lodging, since the school has a hostel for students from remote areas as well as those from the larger town of Tamparuli and far away areas such as Telipok, Inanam and Manggatal townships on the outskirts of Kota Kinabalu, Kota Belud as well as Kundasang/Bundu Tuhan, Ranau.

He often speaks of his childhood fondly:

At the age of just 13, students from my village Lokos would walk to our secondary school in Kiulu every two weeks or so. We would depart at 6am from my village and arrive at our school at 6pm, carrying food supplies, mainly rice. As a young undergraduate from UPM, I would walk for four hours from Pekan Nabalu township in neighbouring Kota Belud to my village, Kampung Lokos. Generally the people from my village are from poor families without a regular source of income as they survived on subsistence farming.

At the end of Form Two he was awarded a Boarding Scholarship from the Sabah State Government to further his studies in SMK Ranau (now known as SMK Mat Salleh) in Form Three in 1974. With the good results he obtained in the Lower Certificate of Education (LCE), he was granted a Sabah State Government Scholarship to pursue his upper secondary education at Setapak High School, Kuala Lumpur.

Inspired by fellow schoolmates in this school, he initiated a student society in his village called KEPALOS, which formed student study groups and fundraised to finance their programmes. In 1976, Tangau passed his Malaysian Certificate of Education (SPM) with Grade One. With this he earned the same scholarship to continue his Form Six at Sekolah Menengah Sains Selangor (SMSS) Cheras, a governmental fully residential school. Whilst schooling there, he was an active student leader and a debater for his school. Prior to his tertiary education while waiting for the results of his Higher School Certificate, he served as a temporary teacher at SMK Tamparuli, Tuaran, Sabah, for five months. He taught Integrated Science or Sains Paduan to Form One students.

In 1979, having successfully completed his Higher School Certificate, Tangau was accepted into University Pertanian Malaysia (UPM), Serdang, Selangor, to do his bachelor's degree in Forestry Science. He was an active student leader at university. He was the President of the Catholic Student Society for two terms from 1981 to 1982. He was also a keen observer of the political development of his birth state Sabah, and nationwide. He graduated in 1983 and soon after, he secured a job at the Sabah Forestry Development Authority (SAFODA) as a research officer on silviculture. In 1985 he was accepted as an individual participant to study forest management in various institutions in Japan under the Japan International Cooperation Agency (JICA) for four months. He had the opportunity to travel and stay in Tokyo, Osaka, Hokkaido and Tsukuba. Subsequently, in 1990 he obtained a master's degree in Development Management from Asian Institute of Management (AIM) in the Philippines.

He is married to Dr. Jaina Sintian, a medical doctor from Bundu Tuhan village, Ranau, who is the founding Vice Chief of the UPKO Women Movement Chief (Wanita UPKO), later becoming its Chief in 2008 and only retired from the position in 2018 when her husband was elected officially as the President of UPKO and served in this position until 2023. Together they have five children; four daughters and a son.

== Prior to politics ==
Shortly after graduating from UPM, Tangau was sent to Japan for a four-month training stint in various research institutions. Upon returning to Sabah in 1985 he assisted Parti Bersatu Sabah (PBS) as a backroom boy to form the new Sabah government. He joined the newly set up Institute for Development Studies (IDS) Sabah as a research associate, and served for nine years until 1994.

When BN toppled PBS in 1994, Tangau assisted leaders who left the party to form Parti Demokratik Sabah (PDS). For the next five years Tangau served as the chief executive officer at the Institute for Indigenous Economic Progress (INDEP) Sabah, a think-tank set established by PDS. The objective of INDEP was to engage Pasokmomogun community groups in Sabah in policymaking and assist UPKO leaders in decision-makings.

Tangau also served as Chairman of several federal agencies and state linked companies such as the Sabah Cultural Board (LKNS), Forest Plantation Development Sdn. Bhd., Malaysian Timber Industrial Board (MTIB) and Asian Supply Base Sdn Bhd (ASB). In addition, Tangau once also sat on the boards of Suria Capital Berhad and Sabah Energy Corporation Sdn. Bhd.

== Political career ==
During the 1999 Sabah state election, 10 of the 12 PDS candidates who contested were defeated. Due to this devastating defeat Tangau was requested by the party leadership to contest in the 1999 parliamentary general election, effectively thrusting him from backroom boy to mainstream politics.

Tangau has been involved in UPKO since the party's early days. Shortly after he was first elected as an MP he became the Information Chief. He was then appointed as the Secretary-General in 2002.

Tangau was elected as the Member of Parliament for Tuaran for the first time in 1999 general election and again in 2004. He did not contest in the 2008 general election, to make way for then-UPKO Deputy President Wilfred Bumburing to contest.

In 2012, Wilfred Bumburing quit UPKO to join the Opposition Pakatan Rakyat coalition, thus the Deputy President post fell vacant. Tangau was elected as the new Deputy President in October 2013, defeating Dr. Ewon Ebin, then-UPKO Vice President, with a slim majority.

In the 2013 general election, he once again was elected as the Member of Parliament for Tuaran and won by a majority of over 5,000 votes.

In March 2014, the founding president Bernard Dompok stepped down, nearly 10 months after he lost the Penampang parliamentary seat in the 2018 general election. Since then, Tangau served as the Acting President of UPKO until he won the president post uncontested in the party's triennial general meeting on 24 September 2018.

== Ministerial career ==
Prime Minister Najib Razak announced a new cabinet line-up on 28 July 2015, involving the appointment of seven new ministers and nine deputy ministers. Tangau was appointed as the Minister of Science, Technology and Innovation. He was sworn in before the Yang di-Pertuan Agong on 4 August 2015.

Tangau's vision for the Ministry has been for science, technology and innovation to be drivers of the “new economy”, or the Fourth Industrial Revolution. He actively promoted innovation as a way of life. Practical problems in life, especially those economic challenges should be properly identified and then innovate to resolved them using science and technologies. Innovators should be encouraged to secure Intellectual Property (IP) for their innovation and then the government should incentivised them to commercialised such that it will generate wealth and create jobs for the people. He started the National Innovation and Creative Economy (NICE) Expo in 2017. He blogs regularly and writes a weekly column every Sunday in the Daily Express, the largest daily newspaper in Sabah, expressing his thoughts about the advancement of science, technology and innovation in the country during his ministerial term.

== Later career ==
In the aftermath of 2018 general election, UPKO under his leadership decided to quit Barisan Nasional and joined the Pakatan Harapan-Warisan government bloc both federally and at the state, citing the popular aspiration for change. Tangau was appointed as nominated assemblyman to serve as Deputy Chief Minister I of Sabah (Kadazandusun Murut/Non-Muslim Bumiputera quota) in the Shafie Apdal cabinet and remained so until the coalition lost snap election in 2020.

== Election results ==
Parliament of Malaysia
Year	Constituency	Candidate	Votes	Pct	Opponent(s)	Votes	Pct	Ballots cast	Majority	Turnout
1999	P149 Tuaran	Wilfred Madius Tangau (UPKO)	13,083	55.58%	Yunof Edward Maringking (PBS)	10,270	43.63%	23,745	2,813	65.88%
1999	P149 Tuaran	Wilfred Madius Tangau (UPKO)	13,083	55.58%	Rubiah F. Ayid (IND)	185	0.79%	23,745	2,813	65.88%
2004	P170 Tuaran	Wilfred Madius Tangau (UPKO)	17,354	66.21%	Ansari Abdullah (PKR)	8,855	33.79%	27,190	8,499	69.14%
2013	P170 Tuaran	Wilfred Madius Tangau (UPKO)	20,685	51.77%	Wilfred Bumburing (PKR)	15,495	38.78%	40,760	5,190	84.62%
2013	P170 Tuaran	Wilfred Madius Tangau (UPKO)	20,685	51.77%	Erveana Ansari (IND)	2,264	5.67%	40,760	5,190	84.62%
2013	P170 Tuaran	Wilfred Madius Tangau (UPKO)	20,685	51.77%	Samin @ Jasmin Dulin (STAR)	1,509	3.78%	40,760	5,190	84.62%
2018	P170 Tuaran	Wilfred Madius Tangau (UPKO)	22,494	51.54%	Chrisnadia Sinam (PKR)	14,870	34.07%	44,601	7,624	82.42%
2018	P170 Tuaran	Wilfred Madius Tangau (UPKO)	22,494	51.54%	Kalakau Untol (PCS)	2,611	5.98%	44,601	7,624	82.42%
2018	P170 Tuaran	Wilfred Madius Tangau (UPKO)	22,494	51.54%	Syra Peter @ P Gom (PHRS)	2,311	5.30%	44,601	7,624	82.42%
2018	P170 Tuaran	Wilfred Madius Tangau (UPKO)	22,494	51.54%	Paumin @ Mohd Aminuddin Aling (PAS)	1,357	3.78%	44,601	7,624	82.42%
2022	P170 Tuaran	Wilfred Madius Tangau (UPKO)	24,943	42.84%	Joniston Bangkuai (PBS)	24,710	42.44%	58,227	233	69.80%
2022	P170 Tuaran	Wilfred Madius Tangau (UPKO)	24,943	42.84%	Jo-Anna Sue Henley Rampas (WARISAN)	5,728	9.84%	58,227	233	69.80%
2022	P170 Tuaran	Wilfred Madius Tangau (UPKO)	24,943	42.84%	Noortaip Suhaili @ Sualee (IND)	2,008	3.45%	58,227	233	69.80%
2022	P170 Tuaran	Wilfred Madius Tangau (UPKO)	24,943	42.84%	Muminin Kalingkong @ Norbinsha (PEJUANG)	445	0.76%	58,227	233	69.80%
2022	P170 Tuaran	Wilfred Madius Tangau (UPKO)	24,943	42.84%	Boby Lewat (IND)	393	0.67%	58,227	233	69.80%

Sabah State Legislative Assembly
Year	Constituency	Candidate	Votes	Pct	Opponent(s)	Votes	Pct	Ballots cast	Majority	Turnout
2020	N15 Kiulu	Wilfred Madius Tangau (UPKO)	2,786	36.11%	Joniston Bangkuai (PBS)	4,007	51.93%	7,716	1,221	70.87%
2020	N15 Kiulu	Wilfred Madius Tangau (UPKO)	2,786	36.11%	Andau Yasun @ Bruno (PCS)	363	4.70%	7,716	1,221	70.87%
2020	N15 Kiulu	Wilfred Madius Tangau (UPKO)	2,786	36.11%	Rozylyn @ Rosalyn Gelunu (LDP)	274	3.55%	7,716	1,221	70.87%
2020	N15 Kiulu	Wilfred Madius Tangau (UPKO)	2,786	36.11%	Dominic Yasun (IND)	266	3.45%	7,716	1,221	70.87%
2020	N15 Kiulu	Wilfred Madius Tangau (UPKO)	2,786	36.11%	Jolianis Lampog (IND)	20	0.26%	7,716	1,221	70.87%
2025	N14 Tamparuli	Wilfred Madius Tangau (UPKO)	8,247	44.86%	Bonaventure Boniface (PBS)	5,691	30.96%	18,383	2,556	68.68%
2025	N14 Tamparuli	Wilfred Madius Tangau (UPKO)	8,247	44.86%	Jinitoh Sontori (STAR)	1,399	7.61%	18,383	2,556	68.68%
2025	N14 Tamparuli	Wilfred Madius Tangau (UPKO)	8,247	44.86%	Joseph Lee Han Kyun (WARISAN)	1,082	5.89%	18,383	2,556	68.68%
2025	N14 Tamparuli	Wilfred Madius Tangau (UPKO)	8,247	44.86%	Gaim @ James Lunkapis (KDM)	697	3.79%	18,383	2,556	68.68%
2025	N14 Tamparuli	Wilfred Madius Tangau (UPKO)	8,247	44.86%	Vun Yun Fook (IND)	377	2.05%	18,383	2,556	68.68%
2025	N14 Tamparuli	Wilfred Madius Tangau (UPKO)	8,247	44.86%	Johan Jahid (IND)	258	1.40%	18,383	2,556	68.68%
2025	N14 Tamparuli	Wilfred Madius Tangau (UPKO)	8,247	44.86%	Julia Ongkili (IMPIAN)	238	1.29%	18,383	2,556	68.68%
2025	N14 Tamparuli	Wilfred Madius Tangau (UPKO)	8,247	44.86%	Raymond Alfred (IND)	229	1.25%	18,383	2,556	68.68%
2025	N14 Tamparuli	Wilfred Madius Tangau (UPKO)	8,247	44.86%	Aliusus Sipil @ Abdul Aziz (RUMPUN)	88	0.48%	18,383	2,556	68.68%
2025	N14 Tamparuli	Wilfred Madius Tangau (UPKO)	8,247	44.86%	Arthur Erik Lee (ANAK NEGERI)	33	0.18%	18,383	2,556	68.68%
2025	N14 Tamparuli	Wilfred Madius Tangau (UPKO)	8,247	44.86%	Andrew Mali (IND)	30	0.18%	18,383	2,556	68.68%
2025	N14 Tamparuli	Wilfred Madius Tangau (UPKO)	8,247	44.86%	Razali Koroh (IND)	14	0.08%	18,383	2,556	68.68%

== Honours ==
=== Honours of Malaysia ===
- Malaysia
  - Companion of the Order of Loyalty to the Crown of Malaysia (JSM) (2000)
  - Recipient of the 17th Yang di-Pertuan Agong Installation Medal (2024)
- Sabah
  - Grand Commander of the Order of Kinabalu (SPDK) – Datuk Seri Panglima (2016)
  - Commander of the Order of Kinabalu (PGDK) – Datuk (2004)
  - Member of the Order of Kinabalu (ADK) (2002)
  - Justice of the Peace (JP) (1998)

== See also ==
- List of longest-serving members of the Parliament of Malaysia
