= Ewon Benedick =

Malaysian politician (born 1983)

Yang Berhormat Datuk Ewon Benedick PGDK JP MP MLA
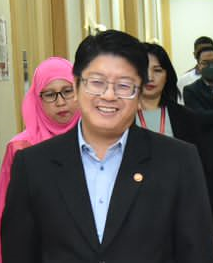
- Ewon Benedick in 2023

Deputy Chief Minister III of Sabah
- Incumbent
- Assumed office 1 December 2025 Serving with: Joachim Gunsalam (Deputy Chief Minister I) &; Masidi Manjun (Deputy Chief Minister II)
- Governor: Musa Aman
- Chief Minister: Hajiji Noor
- Preceded by: Shahelmey Yahya
- Constituency: Kadamaian

State Minister of Industrial Development, Entrepreneurship, and Transport of Sabah
- Incumbent
- Assumed office 1 December 2025
- Governor: Musa Aman
- Chief Minister: Hajiji Noor
- Assistant: Jonnybone J Kurum
- Preceded by: Phoong Jin Zhe (as Minister of Industrial Development and Entrepreneurship)
- Constituency: Kadamaian

Minister of Entrepreneur and Cooperatives Development
- In office 3 December 2022 – 1 December 2025
- Monarchs: Abdullah (2022–2024); Ibrahim (2024-2025)
- Prime Minister: Anwar Ibrahim
- Deputy: Saraswathy Kandasami (2022–2023); Ramanan Ramakrishnan (2023–2025)
- Preceded by: Noh Omar
- Succeeded by: Alexander Nanta Linggi (acting); Steven Sim Chee Keong
- Constituency: Penampang

State Minister of Rural Development of Sabah
- In office 16 May 2018 – 29 September 2020
- Governor: Juhar Mahiruddin
- Chief Minister: Shafie Apdal
- Assistants: Rasinin Kautis & Dumi Pg Masdal
- Preceded by: Ellron Alfred Angin
- Succeeded by: Jahid Jahim
- Constituency: Kadamaian

Member of the Malaysian Parliament for Penampang
- Incumbent
- Assumed office 19 November 2022
- Preceded by: Darell Leiking (WARISAN)
- Majority: 14,410 (2022)

Member of the Sabah State Legislative Assembly for Kadamaian
- Incumbent
- Assumed office 9 May 2018
- Preceded by: Jeremy Ukoh Malajad (Independent)
- Majority: 3,294 (2018); 3,459 (2020); 9,672 (2025)

3rd President of the United Progressive Kinabalu Organisation
- Incumbent
- Assumed office 15 January 2023
- Deputy: Donald Peter Mojuntin
- Preceded by: Wilfred Madius Tangau

2nd State Chairman of Pakatan Harapan of Sabah
- In office 1 December 2024 – 10 November 2025
- National Chairman: Anwar Ibrahim
- Preceded by: Christina Liew Chin Jin
- Succeeded by: Mustapha Sakmud

Personal details
- Born: Ewon Benedick; 1 August 1983 (age 43) Kampung Penampang Proper, Donggongon, Penampang, Sabah, Malaysia
- Party: United Progressive Kinabalu Organisation (UPKO)
- Other political affiliations: Barisan Nasional (BN) (until 2018); Pakatan Harapan (PH) (2021–2025); Gabungan Rakyat Sabah (GRS) (since 2026)
- Spouse: Connie Parantis
- Children: 2
- Education: SM St. Michael, Penampang; Universiti Teknikal Malaysia Melaka
- Occupation: Politician

Ewon Benedick (born 1 August 1983) is a Malaysian politician who has served as Deputy Chief Minister III of Sabah and State Minister of Industrial Development, Entrepreneurship, and Transport of Sabah since December 2025, as well as Member of Parliament (MP) for Penampang since 2022 and Member of the Sabah State Legislative Assembly (MLA) for Kadamaian since 2018. A president of the United Progressive Kinabalu Organisation (UPKO) since 2023, Ewon served as the Chairman of Pakatan Harapan of Sabah from 2024 until 2025.

He served as Minister of Entrepreneur and Cooperatives Development under Prime Minister Anwar Ibrahim from 2022 until his resignation in 2025, and was the State Minister of Rural Development of Sabah under Chief Minister Shafie Apdal from 2018 to 2020.

== Political career ==
Ewon Benedick made his electoral debut in the 2018 Sabah state election and contested in the state constituency of Kadamaian and managed to regain the seat which had been won by Parti Keadilan Rakyat in the 2013 general election.

Following the United Progressive Kinabalu Organisation's (UPKO) decision to quit Barisan Nasional in the aftermath of 2018 general election and align with WARISAN and Pakatan Harapan (PH), Ewon was appointed the State Minister of Rural Development of Sabah. Following the collapse of the WARISAN-led government in 2020, a snap election was held, where he defended his seat despite a poor showing by UPKO; he became the party's sole state legislative assemblyman.

In the 2022 general election, Ewon contested against incumbent Darell Leiking in the federal parliamentary seat of Penampang and overturned a 23,473 majority. He was subsequently appointed Minister of Entrepreneur and Cooperatives Development in the Anwar Ibrahim cabinet.

On 14 January 2023, Ewon took over the presidency of United Progressive Kinabalu Organisation.

On 8 November 2025, Ewon announced his resignation from the cabinet over what he described as the Attorney General's Chambers "disregard' for Sabah's entitlement to 40% of federal revenue collected from the state under the constitution. This followed a court ruling which had affirmed that the federal government had been acting unlawfully for the previous 50 years by failing to pay the state the necessary amount. It was later reveal by Communications Minister Fahmi Fadzil that Ewon was still on leave for the Sabah election campaign and his swearing-in as Deputy Chief Minister III supersede his official date of resignation, thus his federal cabinet position eventually ended.

Political analysts have described Ewon's resignation as a calculated move ahead of the 2025 Sabah state election meant to reaffirm UPKO's image as a party serving Sabahan interests.

== Election results ==
Sabah State Legislative Assembly
Year	Constituency	Candidate	Votes	Pct	Opponent(s)	Votes	Pct	Ballots cast	Majority	Turnout
2018	N07 Kadamaian	Ewon Benedick (UPKO)	6,861	47.80%	Lukia Indan (PKR)	3,567	24.86%	14,712	3,294	72.10%
2018	N07 Kadamaian	Ewon Benedick (UPKO)	6,861	47.80%	Rubbin Guribah (STAR)	3,034	21.14%	14,712	3,294	72.10%
2018	N07 Kadamaian	Ewon Benedick (UPKO)	6,861	47.80%	Mail Balinu (PCS)	764	5.32%	14,712	3,294	72.10%
2018	N07 Kadamaian	Ewon Benedick (UPKO)	6,861	47.80%	Satail Majungkat (PAS)	129	0.88%	14,712	3,294	72.10%
2020	N11 Kadamaian	Ewon Benedick (UPKO)	6,823	51.07%	Demis Rumanti (PBS)	3,364	25.18%	13,360	3,459	74.35%
2020	N11 Kadamaian	Ewon Benedick (UPKO)	6,823	51.07%	Duanis Mogirong (PBRS)	2,050	15.34%	13,360	3,459	74.35%
2020	N11 Kadamaian	Ewon Benedick (UPKO)	6,823	51.07%	Joshua Betting Giling (PCS)	799	5.98%	13,360	3,459	74.35%
2020	N11 Kadamaian	Ewon Benedick (UPKO)	6,823	51.07%	Ernest Leduning Lengik (LDP)	223	1.67%	13,360	3,459	74.35%
2020	N11 Kadamaian	Ewon Benedick (UPKO)	6,823	51.07%	Mohd Farhan Raiting (IND)	101	0.76%	13,360	3,459	74.35%
2025	N11 Kadamaian	Ewon Benedick (UPKO)	11,977	65.60%	Mudezam Muyau @ James Muyou (PBS)	2,305	12.62%	18,469	9,672	70.48%
2025	N11 Kadamaian	Ewon Benedick (UPKO)	11,977	65.60%	Norman Simon (WARISAN)	2,222	12.17%	18,469	9,672	70.48%
2025	N11 Kadamaian	Ewon Benedick (UPKO)	11,977	65.60%	Davylandon Rubbin (STAR)	981	5.37%	18,469	9,672	70.48%
2025	N11 Kadamaian	Ewon Benedick (UPKO)	11,977	65.60%	Josely Taising (KDM)	564	3.09%	18,469	9,672	70.48%
2025	N11 Kadamaian	Ewon Benedick (UPKO)	11,977	65.60%	Judin Tingih (PBM)	84	0.46%	18,469	9,672	70.48%
2025	N11 Kadamaian	Ewon Benedick (UPKO)	11,977	65.60%	Daibi Mandadi (IMPIAN)	74	0.41%	18,469	9,672	70.48%
2025	N11 Kadamaian	Ewon Benedick (UPKO)	11,977	65.60%	Priskila Akwila Senim (ANAK NEGERI)	52	0.28%	18,469	9,672	70.48%

Parliament of Malaysia
Year	Constituency	Candidate	Votes	Pct	Opponent(s)	Votes	Pct	Ballots cast	Majority	Turnout
2022	P174 Penampang	Ewon Benedick (UPKO)	29,066	57.30%	Darell Leiking (WARISAN)	14,656	28.89%	50,730	14,410	65.70%
2022	P174 Penampang	Ewon Benedick (UPKO)	29,066	57.30%	Kenny Chua Teck Ho (STAR)	6,719	13.24%	50,730	14,410	65.70%
2022	P174 Penampang	Ewon Benedick (UPKO)	29,066	57.30%	Richard Jimmy (IND)	289	0.57%	50,730	14,410	65.70%

== Honours ==
=== Honours of Malaysia ===
- Malaysia
  - Recipient of the 17th Yang di-Pertuan Agong Installation Medal (2024)
- Sabah
  - Commander of the Order of Kinabalu (PGDK) – Datuk (2018)
  - Companion of the Order of Kinabalu (ASDK) (2016)
  - Star of the Order of Kinabalu (BK) (2010)
  - Justice of the Peace (JP) (2024)
