= United Progressive Kinabalu Organisation =

Political party of Sabah, Malaysia

United Progressive Kinabalu Organisation Pertubuhan Kinabalu Progresif Bersatu
- Abbreviation: UPKO
- President: Ewon Benedick
- Chairperson: Jeffrey Teo
- Secretary-General: Nelson Angang
- Spokesperson: Peter Jr. Naintin
- Deputy President: Donald Peter Mojuntin
- Vice-Presidents: Pangiran Lalung; Basari Sarkun; Junik Bajit; Wong Thien Fook; Fairuz Bandar; Laurentius Ambu; Gilbert Syam; Sylvester Taing; Jairaiaz Joseph
- Women Chief: Mohina Sidom
- Youth Chief: Carlyle Lajimin
- Treasurer General: Dennison Ramdi Indang
- Founder: Bernard Giluk Dompok
- Founded: March 1994; 32 years ago (Note: March 1994 as Sabah Democratic Party; 8 August 1999 as United Pasokmomogun Kadazandusun Murut Organisation; 24 November 2019 as United Progressive Kinabalu Organisation)
- Split from: PBS
- Preceded by: PDS; UPKO
- Headquarters: PO Box 420, Lot 9 & 10, 2nd & 3rd Floor, New World Commercial Ctr, Donggongon, 89507 Penampang, Sabah
- Newspaper: UPKO Kini; Borneo Mail (defunct); Unofficial: Nabalu News
- Ideology: Sabah regionalism
- National affiliation: Gabungan Rakyat Sabah (2026–present) (Note: The party was formerly part of Barisan Nasional (1994–2018), Warisan Plus (2018–2021), and Pakatan Harapan (2021–2025)); National unity government (2022–present)
- Colours: Blue, white and red
- Slogan: Misompuru Tokou Wagu; Mari Kita Bersatu Kembali (Let Us Be United Again); Doiti Miampai Diau; DI Sini Bersamamu (Here With You)
- Anthem: Gunung Kinabalu
- Dewan Negara: 1 / 70
- Dewan Rakyat: 2 / 26 (Sabah and Labuan seats)
- Sabah State Legislative Assembly: 3 / 79

Election symbol
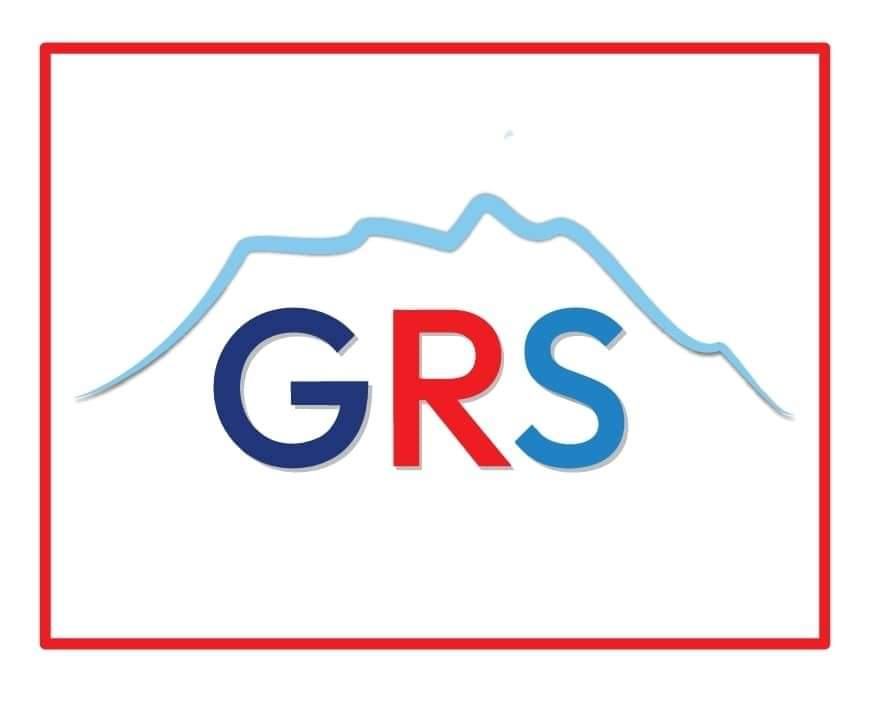

Website
- www.upko.org

The United Progressive Kinabalu Organisation (Malay: Pertubuhan Kinabalu Progresif Bersatu; abbrev: UPKO) is a multiracial political party based in Sabah, Malaysia. The party was rebranded from its previous party's name, United Pasokmomogun Kadazandusun Murut Organisation using the same UPKO acronym; which was a widely known Kadazan-Dusun-Murut based party in 2019. The party had earlier been renamed once before in 1999 from its initial 1994 formation name of Sabah Democratic Party. In 2021, UPKO joined the Pakatan Harapan (PH) coalition, but left in 2025 and applied to join the Gabungan Rakyat Sabah (GRS) in 2026.

== History ==
=== Sabah Democratic Party ===
The party started as Sabah Democratic Party (Parti Demokratik Sabah or PDS) which was founded by Bernard Giluk Dompok and other detractors who split from United Sabah Party (Parti Bersatu Sabah or PBS) soon after the Sabah state election in March 1994 to join the Barisan Nasional (BN) coalition. PBS had earlier won a majority in the Sabah State Legislative Assembly then but with the two breakaway factions setting their own splinter new parties of PDS by Dompok and another United Sabah People's Party (Parti Bersatu Rakyat Sabah or PBRS) by Joseph Kurup had caused the crumble of PBS new Sabah government and allowed BN to form the government instead. Part of the enticement offered by BN to the defectors was the promise of a rotating Chief Ministers of Sabah post, which Dompok held from 1998 to 1999. The defection from PBS however damaged the party at the 1995 general election, in which it won no seats.

=== United Pasokmomogun Kadazandusun Murut Organisation ===
PDS was renamed as United Pasokmomogun Kadazandusun Murut Organisation (UPKO) or Pertubuhan Pasokmomogun Kadazandusun Murut Bersatu on 8 August 1999, taking the same acronym of the now defunct original United Pasokmomogun Kadazan Organisation, which was formed and dissolved in the 1960s by Fuad Stephens. The name of the new UPKO includes the words "Kadazandusun" and "Murut", with a new logo of a silhouette of Mount Kinabalu and was not a water buffalo as in the old UPKO logo. It was redefined as an ethnically based party striving to voice the rights and advance the development of KDM populations of Sabah and the Orang Asli of Peninsular Malaysia.

The party won three federal seats at the 1999 election, and four at the 2004 as well as 2008 polls. In 2009, UPKO opened four divisions in Perak, seeking a foothold among local Orang Asli indigenous people. In the Malaysian general election, 2013, the party was reduced from four to three federal seats and from six to four state assembly seats. Dompok lost his federal seat to the People's Justice Party (PKR). The following year he resigned as the party's president, a position he had held for 20 years.

UPKO was one of the component parties in the Barisan Nasional (BN) coalition which ruled Malaysia until 2018. The party's core Sabahan indigenous constituency includes many Christians, while BN is, on a national scale, dominated by the United Malays National Organisation, an overtly Muslim-Malay party. While a member of the BN federal government, UPKO often spoke out about government policies affecting Christians. In 2013, the party's president Bernard Dompok distanced himself from Prime Minister Najib Razak on the contentious question of the use by Malaysian Christians of the word "Allah" to describe God. Najib had supported a government appeal to the High Court seeking to outlaw the word's use by a Christian newspaper; Dompok criticised the appeal and defended the right of Christians, especially indigenous Malaysians, to use the word.

UPKO also agitated, often against the national government of which it was a part, for tougher measures against illegal immigration in Sabah. In February 2012, UPKO succeeded in forcing the establishment of the Royal Commission of Inquiry on illegal immigrants in Sabah. In the same year one of the party's federal parliamentarians, Wilfred Bumburing, quit UPKO and joined the opposition PKR in protest at what he considered to be government inaction on illegal immigration.

UPKO was an advocate for the repeal of the Internal Security Act, which for over 50 years permitted detention without charge in certain circumstances. The law was repealed in 2011.

In the 2018 general election, the party won only one federal seat and five state assembly seats. Following this, the party's acting president Madius Tangau announced that UPKO with five of their party state assembly seats members had left BN to form a coalition government with the Sabah Heritage Party, alongside PKR, DAP and Amanah became a partner party for the Pakatan Harapan (PH) coalition instead.

Logo(s)

Logo as the United Pasokmomogun Kadazandusun Murut Organisation

=== United Progressive People of Kinabalu Organisation ===
The party was re-branded again as United Progressive People of Kinabalu Organisation or Pertubuhan Kinabalu Progresif Bersatu while retaining its existing UPKO acronym on 23 November 2019. There is also a slight change in UPKO's logo with the inclusion of a new colour, red while the Mount Kinabalu image remains. The party re-branding process was aimed to migrate from the communal politics to a universal and inclusive politics by opening the party membership to other races than KDM communities. On 26 August 2021, it officially joined opposition Pakatan Harapan coalition. It left on 10 November 2025.

== Organisational Structure ==
Supreme Council (2026–2029)

- Elders/Advisory Council Chair:
  - Wences Angang @ Wenceslaus James
- Elections Committee Chair:
  - Philip Benedict Lasimbang
- Party Chairperson:
  - Jeffrey Teo
- Honorary President:
  - Wilfred Madius Tangau
- President:
  - Ewon Benedick
- Deputy President:
  - Donald Peter Mojuntin
- Vice-president:
  - Pangiran Lalung
  - Jairaiaz Joseph
  - Basari Sarkun
  - Wong Thien Fook
  - Junik Bajit
  - Laurentius Ambu
  - Fairuz Bandar
  - Gilbert Syam
  - Selvester Taing
- Women Chief:
  - Mohina Sidom
- Youth Chief:
  - Carlyle Lajimin
- Secretary-General:
  - Nelson Wences Angang
- Deputy Secretary-General:
  - Junsim Rumunzing
  - Georgina George
- Treasurer-General:
  - Dennison Ramdi Indang
- Deputy Treasurer-General:
  - Kennedy John Angian
  - Jasni Shirlin
- Information Chief:
  - Felix Joseph Saang
- Deputy Information Chief:
  - Aduka Jasnin Suman
  - Suzie Salapan
- Organising Secretary:
  - Carl Moosom
- Deputy Organising Secretary:
  - Rowindy Lawrence Odong
- Supreme Council Members:
  - Joesey Limy
  - Jamil Majingkin
  - Fauziah Kudus
  - Jubilin Kilan
  - Marcel Tambud
  - Mat Lunad Agok
  - Macquel Sagundai George
  - Condrad Wong
  - Terence Lee Swee Hong
  - Patrick Epin
  - Benjamin Taine
  - George Sidis Majamin
  - Benjamin Talah
  - Emmanuel Atin (Generasi Muda Chief)
  - Rogers Tiam @ Aloysius
  - Suki Mee
  - Juin Tannyuh
  - Vioery Bin Eming
  - Alvin Lee
- Executive Secretary:
  - William Sampil
- State Liaison Officer:
  - Perak: Suki Mee

== Elected representatives ==
UPKO currently holds two seats in the federal House of Representatives and three in the Sabah State Legislative Assembly.

=== Dewan Negara (Senate) ===
==== Senators ====
- His Majesty's appointee:
  - Nelson Wences Angang

=== Dewan Rakyat (House of Representatives) ===
==== Members of Parliament of the 15th Malaysian Parliament ====
UPKO currently has 2 members in the Dewan Rakyat.

State	No.	Parliament Constituency	Member
Sabah	P170	Tuaran	Wilfred Madius Tangau
Sabah	P174	Penampang	Ewon Benedick
Total	Sabah (2)		

=== Dewan Undangan Negeri (State Legislative Assembly) ===
Sabah State Legislative Assembly

3 / 79

State	No.	Federal Constituency	No.	State Constituency	Member
Sabah	P169	Kota Belud	N11	Kadamaian	Ewon Benedick
Sabah	P170	Tuaran	N14	Tamparuli	Wilfred Madius Tangau
Sabah	P174	Penampang	N26	Moyog	Donald Peter Mojuntin
Total	Sabah (3)				

== Government offices ==
=== State governments ===
UPKO currently served as junior partner in GRS government. Counting its predecessor PDS, it has provided one Chief Minister under the Barisan Nasional rotation system that lasted between 1994 and 2004.

- Sabah (1994–1998, 1998–1999, 1999–2020, 2022–present)

Note: bold as Menteri Besar/Chief Minister, italic as junior partner

State	Leader type	Member	State Constituency
Sabah	Deputy Chief Minister III	Ewon Benedick	Kadamaian

== Election results ==
=== General election results ===
Election	Total seats won	Seats contested	Total votes	Voting Percentage	Outcome of election	Election leader
1995 (as PDS)	0 / 192	5			; No representation in Parliament (Barisan Nasional)	Bernard Giluk Dompok
1999	3 / 193	5	46,913	0.70%	▲3 seats; Governing coalition (Barisan Nasional)	Bernard Giluk Dompok
2004	4 / 219	5	55,117	0.79%	▲1 seat; Governing coalition (Barisan Nasional)	Bernard Giluk Dompok
2008	4 / 222	5	58,856	0.74%	; Governing coalition (Barisan Nasional)	Bernard Giluk Dompok
2013	3 / 222	5	53,584	0.48%	▼1 seat; Governing coalition (Barisan Nasional)	Bernard Giluk Dompok
2018	1 / 222	5	57,062	0.47%	▼2 seats; Opposition coalition (Barisan Nasional), later Governing coalition, later Opposition coalition (Pakatan Harapan)	Wilfred Madius Tangau
2022	2 / 222	5	72,751	0.47%	▲1 seat; Governing coalition (Pakatan Harapan)	Wilfred Madius Tangau; Ewon Benedick

=== State election results ===
Sabah State Legislative Assembly
Election	Votes		Seats			Position (Note: As part of electoral coalition.)	Status
Election	Count	%	Result	Won / contested	+/–	Position	Status
1999	47,494	9.2	2 / 60	2 / 12	▲2	▲1st (Barisan Nasional)	BN
2004	24,783	5.9	5 / 60	5 / 6	▲3	1st (Barisan Nasional)	BN
2008	28,191	5.3	6 / 60	6 / 6	▲3	1st (Barisan Nasional)	BN
2013	34,550	4.5	4 / 60	4 / 6	▼2	1st (Barisan Nasional)	BN
2018	38,698	4.6	5 / 60	5 / 6	▲1	1st (Barisan Nasional)	BN–STAR (2018)
2018	38,698	4.6	5 / 60	5 / 6	▲1	1st (Barisan Nasional)	WARISAN–PH–UPKO (2018–2020)
2020	29,473	4.0	1 / 73	1 / 12	▼4	▼2nd (Warisan Plus)	Opposition (2020–2023)
2020	29,473	4.0	1 / 73	1 / 12	▼4	▼2nd (Warisan Plus)	GRS–PH (2023–2025)
2025	64,471	5.7	3 / 73	3 / 25	▲2	▼4th	GRS–PH–BN

== See also ==
- Politics of Malaysia
- List of political parties in Malaysia
- Sabah Democratic Party (PDS)
- United Pasokmomogun Kadazan Organisation (UPKO) (Old)
