= Tinggi Setapak National Secondary School =

Coordinates: 3.1861°N 101.7165°E

Setapak High School
- Sekolah Menengah Kebangsaan Tinggi Setapak

Location
- Jalan Air Jernih; Kuala Lumpur, Federal Territory; Malaysia

Information
- Type: Government-aided secondary school
- Motto: Ilmu Tangga Kemajuan (Knowledge is the Stairway to Advancement)
- Established: 12 January 1955
- Grades: First Form - Sixth Form
- Enrollment: > 1000
- Language: Malay
- Yearbook: Setapakian

Setapak High School (Malay: Sekolah Menengah Kebangsaan Tinggi Setapak) is a national secondary school in Kuala Lumpur, Malaysia. Established in 1955, it is an all-boys school, with the exception of the coed Sixth Form. When first established, it was located in High Street, Kuala Lumpur (hence its name), before moving to its current location in Setapak in 1963. The school is active in the sports arena, especially in the inter-school hockey championships.

== History ==
The school was established in 1955 with the name High Street School, which was located at High Street (later Jalan Bandar, now Jalan Tun H S Lee) in the heart of Kuala Lumpur. It was opened on 12 January 1955 by Dato' Othman bin Mohamed, the Menteri Besar (chief minister) of Selangor at that time. Sultan Hisamuddin Alam Shah, the Sultan of Selangor, officially opened High Street School on 11 April 1955.

Mr. Luke, the Selangor Education Officer, was instrumental in the formation of the school. The first headmaster was Mr. Herman M de Souza, a former teacher of VI. The school's motto was "Lead By Leading" and the medium of instruction was English.

The school complex, built in 1893, formerly housed Victoria Institution (VI) until 1929 when VI moved to its new premises in Petaling Hill. The Technical College (now known as Universiti Teknologi Malaysia) occupied the complex in 1930 and remained there until 1954 when it moved to Gurney Road (now Jalan Semarak). In 1955, the complex became High Street School.

In addition to normal lessons, the school had classes in commercial subjects such as Shorthand, Typewriting and Bookkeeping. It also had lessons on carpentry, metal works and technical drawings. The first batch of students to sit for the Cambridge School Certificate did so in 1959. They also sat for the full London Chamber of Commerce Intermediate School Certificate examination. This was encouraged by the headmaster Mr Herman de Souza who was the class teacher for the first batch of Form One students and continued teaching them as their class teacher until they reached Form Five in 1959.

In 1962, the school moved to make way for the construction of an overhead bridge. While waiting for the new school buildings to be completed, the students were placed temporarily in St. John's Institution in the afternoon session for two school terms from April 1962 until the end of that year. According to ex-students' accounts, this was where school's rivalry with St. John's began.

In January 1963, High Street School moved to its present location in Setapak, Kuala Lumpur. The new school building was officially opened by the Minister of Education, Mr. Mohamed Khir Johari, on 15 April 1968. The school had also dropped the "Street" from its name to become High School Kuala Lumpur. Since then, it has been affectionately known as 'High School' and is the only school in Kuala Lumpur to use the tag even up until today in the age of Sekolah Menengah Kebangsaan.

The present school badge was the second one since 1968. Mr. Kevin de Souza, Head of Arts in 1968, designed the first school badge.

The school motto was changed to "Ilmu Tangga Kemajuan" (Knowledge is Key to Improvement) in the 1980s. In 2002, it was changed again to "Setapak di Hadapan" (One Step Ahead).

The building that the school first resided on at High Street was utilised by the Kuala Lumpur Traffic Police in the 1980s. However, the building was virtually abandoned when a new multi-storey building for the traffic police was built next to it. In the evening of 29 July 1999, the old school building was razed by fire, believed to have been started by drug addicts hiding in the building that was supposedly locked. It has since been rebuilt on the remaining concrete columns, walls and foundation that survived the fire.

== Principals ==
Period of service	Name
January 1955 – May 1966	Herman M de Souza
June 1966 – December 1966	S.M. Ponniah
January 1967 – December 1970	N. Rajendra
January 1971 – April 1971	Michael Loh
April 1971 – June 1981	Peter Tay
June 1981 – January 1988	V. Chakaravarthy
February 1988 – September 1988	June bin Jais
October 1988 – August 1992	Abdul Manaf bin Mohamed
August 1992 – January 1994	Muda @ Ibrahim bin Aki
February 1995 – March 1996	Abdul Rahim bin Mohamad
March 1996 – June 1998	Aziz bin Said
January 1998 – February 2000	Wan Mohamad Kasim bin Wan Abu Bakar
February 2000 – October 2005	Mohd. Nor bin Rajikin
November 2005 – June 2008	Che Azizah binti Saad
July 2008 – 2010	Maslan bin Buniran
2010 - 2013	Esaah binti Ismail
2013 - 2017	Naseh bin Hassan
2018 - 2023	Zubidah binti Md Yunos
2023–Present	Norazah Bint Shahrifudin
