= 2013 Sabah state election =

State election in Sabah, Malaysia

- 5 May 2013

All 60 seats in the Sabah State Legislative Assembly 31 seats needed for a majority
- Turnout: 784,638 (79.87%)
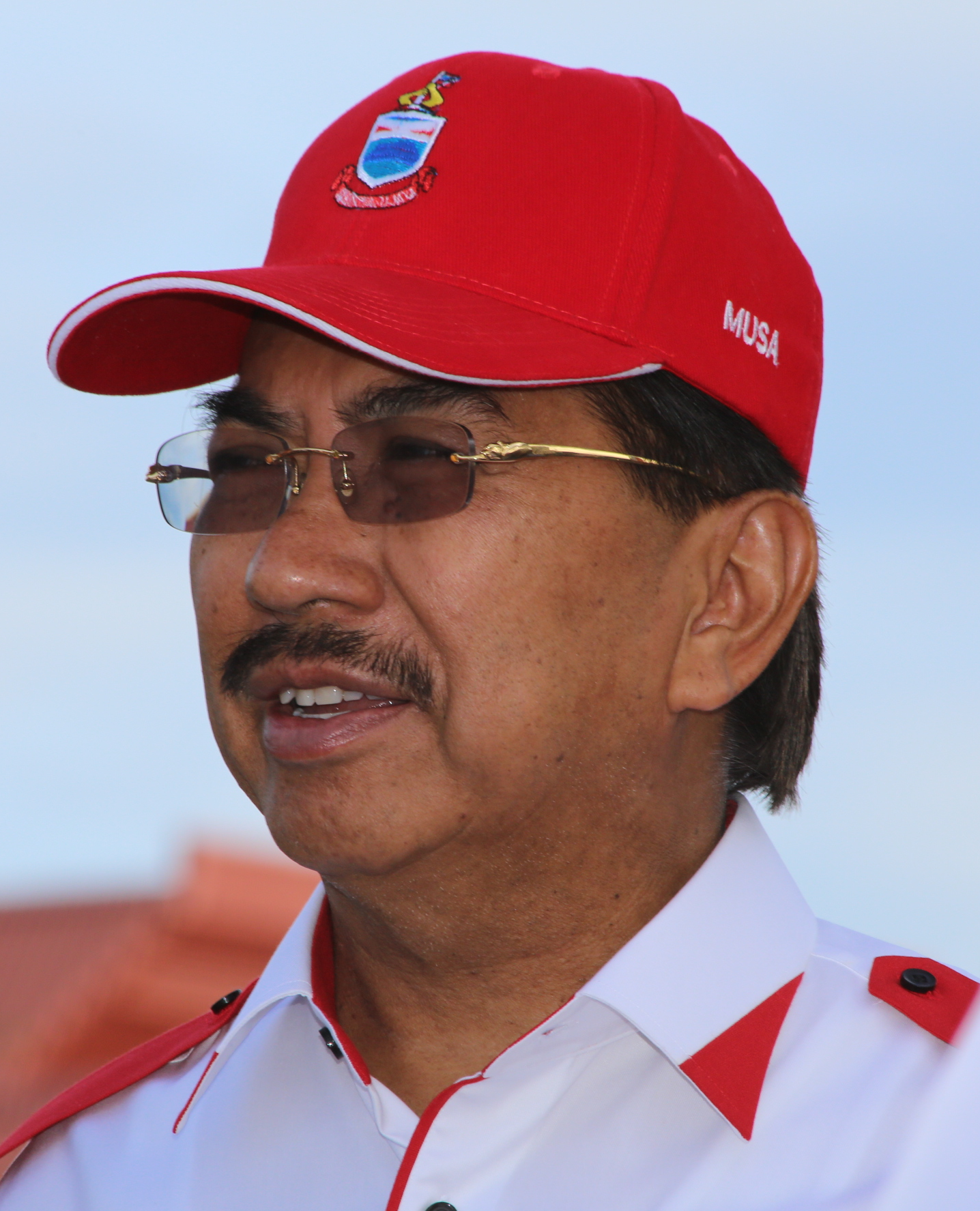

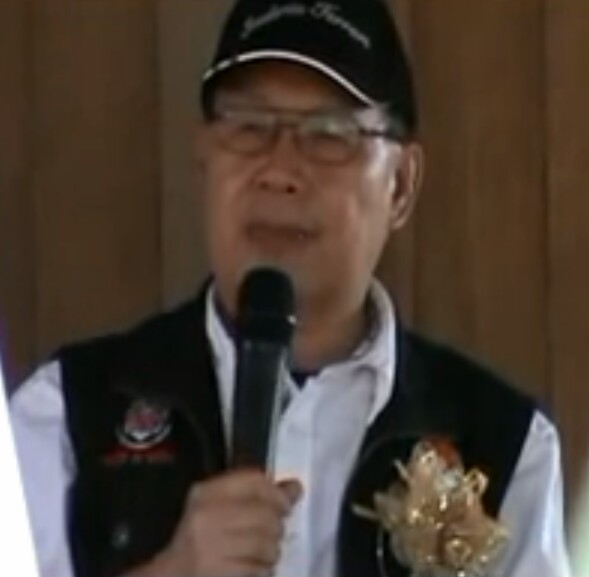
	Majority party	Minority party	Third party
		PR
Leader	Musa Aman	Lajim Ukin	Jeffrey Kitingan
Party	BN	PKR (PR (Note: As PR was not registered as political party, each component party competes as their own name and logo.))	STAR
Leader since	27 March 2003	16 June 2013	6 January 2012
Leader's seat	Sungai Sibuga	Klias	Bingkor
Last election	59 seats (Note: All the figures of votes and seats are a combined result of all the component parties in BN.)	1 seat (Note: All the figures of votes and seats are a combined result of PKR, DAP and PAS.)	New party
Seats before	57	1	Steady
Seats won	48	11	1
Seat change	▼11	▲10	▲1
Popular vote	427,890	248,185	43,167
Percentage	55.78%	32.36%	5.63%
	Fourth party
	SAPP
Leader	Yong Teck Lee
Party	SAPP
Leader since	21 January 1994
Leader's seat	Likas (lost)
Last election	4 seats
Seats before	2
Seats won	0
Seat change	▼4
Popular vote	28,305
Percentage	3.69%
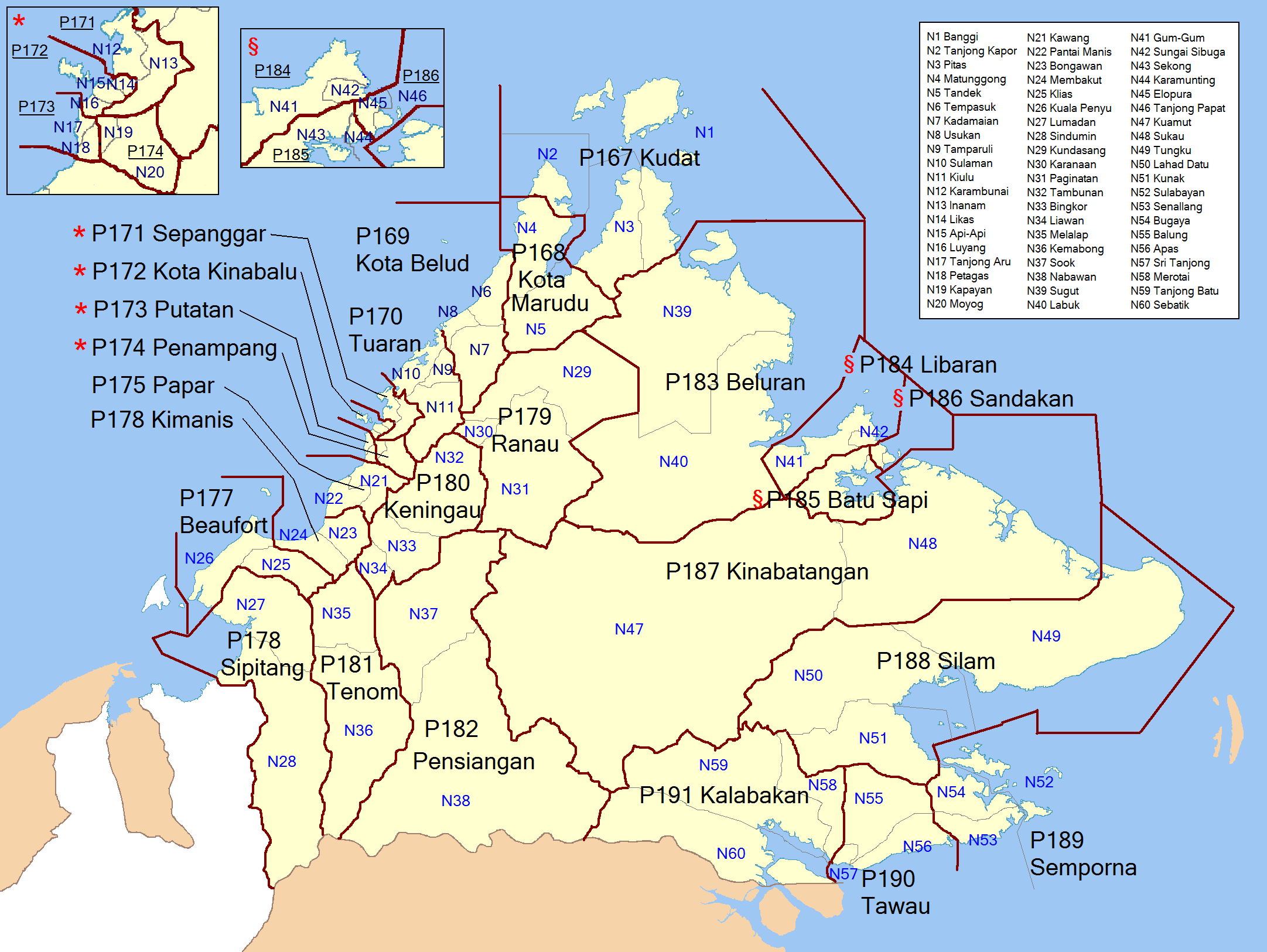
- Parliamentary and state constituencies in Sabah
Chief Minister before election
Musa Aman
BN
Chief Minister-designate
Musa Aman
BN

The 2013 Sabah state election was held on Sunday, 5 May 2013 concurrently with the 13th Malaysian general election. 60 state seats were contested to elect the state legislature in the Malaysian state of Sabah. This was the 12th state election in Sabah. The state legislative assembly was dissolved on 3 April 2013 following the announcement by Najib Razak to dissolve the federal Parliament earlier on the same day. Sabahans would also elect 25 representatives to the federal legislature which would be covered as part of the general election.

The 2008 election was won by the Barisan Nasional (BN) coalition, winning 59 out 60 seats. After the 2008 election, the Sabah Progressive Party (SAPP) withdrew from the BN coalition, resulting in 2 state seats to move out of BN. As a result, the composition of parties in the state legislature prior to dissolution was BN with 57, SAPP with 2 and DAP with 1 seat.

The final results showed that BN would keep the assembly with 48 seats, a decrease of 11 seats. The newly formed Pakatan Rakyat won 11 seats, comparing to 1 in the last assembly. The Sabah chapter of State Reform Party also won 1 seat via its leader Jeffrey Kitingan, while another Sabah-based party SAPP was wiped out from the assembly.

The Sabah state election were conducted barely 3 months after the incident in Lahad Datu on February that year.

== Contenders ==
BN was defending their previous victory and contested in all 60 state seats. out of the 60 seats, UMNO contested in 32, PBS in 13, UPKO in 6, LDP in 4 MCA in 2, GERAKAN in 2 and PBRS in 1. BN was challenged by the newly formed Pakatan Rakyat coalition consisting of PKR (43), DAP (8) and PAS (9). Other than Pakatan Rakyat, SAPP (41), STAR (47), BERSAMA (3) and KITA (1) also contested in the elections.

== Parliamentary election results ==
There were 25 parliamentary or federal seats contested in Sabah. Barisan Nasional won 22 seats while DAP won 2 seats (Kota Kinabalu and Sandakan) and PKR won 1 (Penampang).

== Results ==
Party or alliance		Votes	%	Seats	+/–
Barisan Nasional	United Malays National Organisation	260,342	33.94	31	–1
Barisan Nasional	United Sabah Party	77,983	10.17	7	–5
Barisan Nasional	United Pasokmomogun Kadazandusun Murut Organisation	34,550	4.50	4	–2
Barisan Nasional	Liberal Democratic Party	25,264	3.29	3	0
Barisan Nasional	Parti Gerakan Rakyat Malaysia	14,258	1.86	2	+2
Barisan Nasional	Malaysian Chinese Association	8,270	1.08	0	–1
Barisan Nasional	Parti Bersatu Rakyat Sabah	7,223	0.94	1	0
Barisan Nasional	Total	427,890	55.79	48	–7
Pakatan Rakyat	People's Justice Party	164,068	21.39	7	+7
Pakatan Rakyat	Democratic Action Party	62,784	8.19	4	+3
Pakatan Rakyat	Pan-Malaysian Islamic Party	21,333	2.78	0	0
Pakatan Rakyat	Total	248,185	32.36	11	+10
State Reform Party		43,167	5.63	1	+1
Sabah Progressive Party		28,305	3.69	0	–4
Malaysian United People's Party		1,444	0.19	0	0
People's Welfare Party		138	0.02	0	0
Independents		17,902	2.33	0	0
Total		767,031	100.00	60	0
Valid votes		767,031	97.76		
Invalid/blank votes		17,607	2.24		
Total votes		784,638	100.00		
Registered voters/turnout		982,337	79.87		

=== Results for Barisan Nasional component parties ===
Barisan Nasional coalition
Party	Seats contested	Seats won
Liberal Democratic Party (LDP)	4	3
Malaysian Chinese Association (MCA)	2	0
Parti Bersatu Rakyat Sabah (PBRS)	1	1
Parti Bersatu Sabah (PBS)	13	7
Parti Gerakan Rakyat Malaysia (GERAKAN)	2	2
United Malays National Organisation (UMNO)	32	31
United Pasokmomogun Kadazandusun Murut Organisation (UPKO)	6	4
TOTAL	60	48

== Result details ==
2013 Sabah state election results
Candidate	Party	Votes	Majority	Voter turnout
N01 - BANGGI
Abd Mijul Unaini	BN - UMNO	4293	3239	Registered voters: 9886; Turnout: 7257 (73,4%); Spoilt votes: 256
Mursalim Tanjul	Independent	642		Registered voters: 9886; Turnout: 7257 (73,4%); Spoilt votes: 256
Jae-ly Medong	SAPP	533		Registered voters: 9886; Turnout: 7257 (73,4%); Spoilt votes: 256
Abdul Razak Abdul Salam	PR - PKR	1054		Registered voters: 9886; Turnout: 7257 (73,4%); Spoilt votes: 256
Mohd Arifin Abdul Salam	STAR	479		Registered voters: 9886; Turnout: 7257 (73,4%); Spoilt votes: 256
N02 - TANJONG KAPOR
Zainal Nasiruddin	MUPP	363		Registered voters: 22486; Turnout: 17364 (77,2%); Spoilt votes: 398
Alexander Anthony	Independent	35		Registered voters: 22486; Turnout: 17364 (77,2%); Spoilt votes: 398
Hendiri Minar	STAR	273		Registered voters: 22486; Turnout: 17364 (77,2%); Spoilt votes: 398
Tsen Heng Chong	SAPP	500		Registered voters: 22486; Turnout: 17364 (77,2%); Spoilt votes: 398
Teo Chee Kang	BN - LDP	8890	1985	Registered voters: 22486; Turnout: 17364 (77,2%); Spoilt votes: 398
Chin Chung Kui	PR - PKR	6905		Registered voters: 22486; Turnout: 17364 (77,2%); Spoilt votes: 398
N03 - PITAS
Johnes Piut	SAPP	232		Registered voters: 14931; Turnout: 11745 (78,7%); Spoilt votes: 354
Awang Latip Abdul Salam	KITA	138		Registered voters: 14931; Turnout: 11745 (78,7%); Spoilt votes: 354
Maklin Masiau	STAR	3111		Registered voters: 14931; Turnout: 11745 (78,7%); Spoilt votes: 354
Bolkiah Ismail	BN - UMNO	6934	3823	Registered voters: 14931; Turnout: 11745 (78,7%); Spoilt votes: 354
Dausieh Queck	PR - PAS	976		Registered voters: 14931; Turnout: 11745 (78,7%); Spoilt votes: 354
N04 - MATUNGGONG
Sarapin Magana	BN - PBS	6627		Registered voters: 20005; Turnout: 15901 (79,5%); Spoilt votes: 370
Richard Jiun	SAPP	367		Registered voters: 20005; Turnout: 15901 (79,5%); Spoilt votes: 370
Marunsai Dawai	STAR	1536		Registered voters: 20005; Turnout: 15901 (79,5%); Spoilt votes: 370
Jelin Dasanap	PR - PKR	6947	320	Registered voters: 20005; Turnout: 15901 (79,5%); Spoilt votes: 370
Jolius Majawai	Independent	54		Registered voters: 20005; Turnout: 15901 (79,5%); Spoilt votes: 370
N05 - TANDEK
Andonny Pilit	PR - PKR	4124		Registered voters: 22264; Turnout: 17170 (77,1%); Spoilt votes: 599
Jebon Janaun	STAR	2668		Registered voters: 22264; Turnout: 17170 (77,1%); Spoilt votes: 599
Henry Yapolai Kundapit	SAPP	380		Registered voters: 22264; Turnout: 17170 (77,1%); Spoilt votes: 599
Anita Baranting	BN - PBS	9399	5275	Registered voters: 22264; Turnout: 17170 (77,1%); Spoilt votes: 599
N06 - TEMPASUK
Abdul Malik Mohed	SAPP	319		Registered voters: 16889; Turnout: 14193 (84%); Spoilt votes: 325
Laiman Ikin	PR - PAS	3285		Registered voters: 16889; Turnout: 14193 (84%); Spoilt votes: 325
Suwah Buleh	STAR	1769		Registered voters: 16889; Turnout: 14193 (84%); Spoilt votes: 325
Musbah Jamli	BN - UMNO	8495	5210	Registered voters: 16889; Turnout: 14193 (84%); Spoilt votes: 325
N07 - KADAMAIAN
Timbon Lagadan	BN - PBS	4988		Registered voters: 15924; Turnout: 13590 (85,3%); Spoilt votes: 301
Jeremmy Ukoh Malajad	PR - PKR	5877	889	Registered voters: 15924; Turnout: 13590 (85,3%); Spoilt votes: 301
Rubbin Guribah	STAR	1877		Registered voters: 15924; Turnout: 13590 (85,3%); Spoilt votes: 301
Peter Marajin	SAPP	547		Registered voters: 15924; Turnout: 13590 (85,3%); Spoilt votes: 301
N08 - USUKAN
Md Salleh Md Said	BN - UMNO	10879	6812	Registered voters: 18736; Turnout: 15603 (83,3%); Spoilt votes: 372
Bakhruddin Ismail	STAR	285		Registered voters: 18736; Turnout: 15603 (83,3%); Spoilt votes: 372
Mustapha Sakmud	PR - PKR	4067		Registered voters: 18736; Turnout: 15603 (83,3%); Spoilt votes: 372
N09 - TAMPARULI
Wilfred Mojilip Bumburing	PR - PKR	6862	383	Registered voters: 17291; Turnout: 14428 (83,4%); Spoilt votes: 187
Linggu Bukut	STAR	589		Registered voters: 17291; Turnout: 14428 (83,4%); Spoilt votes: 187
Stephan Gaimin	SAPP	185		Registered voters: 17291; Turnout: 14428 (83,4%); Spoilt votes: 187
James Ongkili Jr	Independent	126		Registered voters: 17291; Turnout: 14428 (83,4%); Spoilt votes: 187
Jahid Jahim	BN - PBS	6479		Registered voters: 17291; Turnout: 14428 (83,4%); Spoilt votes: 187
N10 - SULAMAN
Hajiji Noor	BN - UMNO	13065	10441	Registered voters: 19616; Turnout: 17044 (86,9%); Spoilt votes: 449
David Orok	STAR	225		Registered voters: 19616; Turnout: 17044 (86,9%); Spoilt votes: 449
Arifin Harith	Independent	66		Registered voters: 19616; Turnout: 17044 (86,9%); Spoilt votes: 449
Gulabdin Enjih	PR - PKR	2624		Registered voters: 19616; Turnout: 17044 (86,9%); Spoilt votes: 449
Ali Bakar Kawi	Independent	615		Registered voters: 19616; Turnout: 17044 (86,9%); Spoilt votes: 449
N11 - KIULU
Tindil Gonsobil	SAPP	129		Registered voters: 11444; Turnout: 9288 (81,2%); Spoilt votes: 171
John Hussein	Independent	517		Registered voters: 11444; Turnout: 9288 (81,2%); Spoilt votes: 171
Rhodes Panilau	PR - PKR	3701		Registered voters: 11444; Turnout: 9288 (81,2%); Spoilt votes: 171
Terence Sinti	STAR	1025		Registered voters: 11444; Turnout: 9288 (81,2%); Spoilt votes: 171
Joniston Bangkuai	BN - PBS	3745	44	Registered voters: 11444; Turnout: 9288 (81,2%); Spoilt votes: 171
N12 - KARAMBUNAI
Muali Aching	PR - PKR	5542		Registered voters: 28940; Turnout: 23341 (80,7%); Spoilt votes: 661
Ag Maidin Ag Apong	Independent	171		Registered voters: 28940; Turnout: 23341 (80,7%); Spoilt votes: 661
Aziz Ibrahim	SAPP	1977		Registered voters: 28940; Turnout: 23341 (80,7%); Spoilt votes: 661
Rano Susulan	Independent	916		Registered voters: 28940; Turnout: 23341 (80,7%); Spoilt votes: 661
Jainab Ahmad	BN - UMNO	14074	8532	Registered voters: 28940; Turnout: 23341 (80,7%); Spoilt votes: 661
N13 - INANAM
Roland Chia Ming Shen	PR - PKR	8926	3202	Registered voters: 24428; Turnout: 20074 (82,2%); Spoilt votes: 421
Eric Majimbun	SAPP	5003		Registered voters: 24428; Turnout: 20074 (82,2%); Spoilt votes: 421
Joseph Paulus Lantip	BN - PBS	5724		Registered voters: 24428; Turnout: 20074 (82,2%); Spoilt votes: 421
N14 - LIKAS
Wong Hong Jun	PR - DAP	7746	5652	Registered voters: 15312; Turnout: 11581 (75,6%); Spoilt votes: 99
Chin Shu Ying	BN - LDP	2094		Registered voters: 15312; Turnout: 11581 (75,6%); Spoilt votes: 99
Yong Teck Lee	SAPP	1487		Registered voters: 15312; Turnout: 11581 (75,6%); Spoilt votes: 99
Ho Cheong Tshun	STAR	155		Registered voters: 15312; Turnout: 11581 (75,6%); Spoilt votes: 99
N15 - API-API
Liew Chin Jin	PR - PKR	5853	795	Registered voters: 15115; Turnout: 12099 (80%); Spoilt votes: 309
Marcel Jude Joseph	Independent	14		Registered voters: 15115; Turnout: 12099 (80%); Spoilt votes: 309
Wong Yit Ming	SAPP	713		Registered voters: 15115; Turnout: 12099 (80%); Spoilt votes: 309
Felix Chong Kat Fah	STAR	152		Registered voters: 15115; Turnout: 12099 (80%); Spoilt votes: 309
Yee Moh Chai	BN - PBS	5058		Registered voters: 15115; Turnout: 12099 (80%); Spoilt votes: 309
N16 - LUYANG
Chia Chui Ket	SAPP	1694		Registered voters: 20142; Turnout: 15813 (78,5%); Spoilt votes: 110
Shim Tshin Nyuk	BN - MCA	2537		Registered voters: 20142; Turnout: 15813 (78,5%); Spoilt votes: 110
Hiew King Cheu	PR - DAP	11213	8676	Registered voters: 20142; Turnout: 15813 (78,5%); Spoilt votes: 110
Jafery Jomion	STAR	259		Registered voters: 20142; Turnout: 15813 (78,5%); Spoilt votes: 110
N17 - TANJONG ARU
Yong Oui Fah	BN - PBS	9099	3690	Registered voters: 21951; Turnout: 17049 (77,7%); Spoilt votes: 458
Salleh Tiaseh	STAR	750		Registered voters: 21951; Turnout: 17049 (77,7%); Spoilt votes: 458
Hamid Ismail	PR - PAS	5409		Registered voters: 21951; Turnout: 17049 (77,7%); Spoilt votes: 458
Yong We Kong	SAPP	1333		Registered voters: 21951; Turnout: 17049 (77,7%); Spoilt votes: 458
N18 - PETAGAS
Awang Ahmad Sah	STAR	1111		Registered voters: 15500; Turnout: 12733 (82,1%); Spoilt votes: 267
Yahyah Hussin	BN - UMNO	8504	5653	Registered voters: 15500; Turnout: 12733 (82,1%); Spoilt votes: 267
Mat Yunin Atin	PR - PKR	2851		Registered voters: 15500; Turnout: 12733 (82,1%); Spoilt votes: 267
N19 - KAPAYAN
Khoo Keok Hai	BN - MCA	5733		Registered voters: 26806; Turnout: 21719 (81%); Spoilt votes: 216
Phillip Among	STAR	20		Registered voters: 26806; Turnout: 21719 (81%); Spoilt votes: 216
Edwin Bosi	PR - DAP	13020	7287	Registered voters: 26806; Turnout: 21719 (81%); Spoilt votes: 216
Chong Pit Fah	SAPP	2030		Registered voters: 26806; Turnout: 21719 (81%); Spoilt votes: 216
N20 - MOYOG
Terrence Siambun	PR - PKR	7462	1682	Registered voters: 17604; Turnout: 14828 (84,2%); Spoilt votes: 204
Bernard Lawrence Solibun	STAR	603		Registered voters: 17604; Turnout: 14828 (84,2%); Spoilt votes: 204
Danim Siap	SAPP	779		Registered voters: 17604; Turnout: 14828 (84,2%); Spoilt votes: 204
Philip Benedict Lasimbang	BN - UPKO	5780		Registered voters: 17604; Turnout: 14828 (84,2%); Spoilt votes: 204
N21 - KAWANG
Kefli Safar	PR - PKR	3401		Registered voters: 19888; Turnout: 17093 (85,9%); Spoilt votes: 237
Edward Dagul	SAPP	906		Registered voters: 19888; Turnout: 17093 (85,9%); Spoilt votes: 237
Akop Damsah	STAR	248		Registered voters: 19888; Turnout: 17093 (85,9%); Spoilt votes: 237
Ghulamhaidar Khan Bahadar	BN - UMNO	12301	8900	Registered voters: 19888; Turnout: 17093 (85,9%); Spoilt votes: 237
N22 - PANTAI MANIS
Abdul Rahim Ismail	BN - UMNO	9639	4409	Registered voters: 18886; Turnout: 16114 (85,3%); Spoilt votes: 239
Noraizal Mohd Noor	SAPP	403		Registered voters: 18886; Turnout: 16114 (85,3%); Spoilt votes: 239
Fred Gabriel	PR - PKR	5230		Registered voters: 18886; Turnout: 16114 (85,3%); Spoilt votes: 239
Baharudin Nayan	STAR	603		Registered voters: 18886; Turnout: 16114 (85,3%); Spoilt votes: 239
N23 - BONGAWAN
Mohamad Alamin	BN - UMNO	7443	3392	Registered voters: 14855; Turnout: 12866 (86,6%); Spoilt votes: 261
Awang Talip Awang Bagul	SAPP	335		Registered voters: 14855; Turnout: 12866 (86,6%); Spoilt votes: 261
Ibrahim Menudin	PR - PKR	4051		Registered voters: 14855; Turnout: 12866 (86,6%); Spoilt votes: 261
Ak Aliuddin Mohd Tahir	Independent	455		Registered voters: 14855; Turnout: 12866 (86,6%); Spoilt votes: 261
Assim Matali	STAR	321		Registered voters: 14855; Turnout: 12866 (86,6%); Spoilt votes: 261
N24 - MEMBAKUT
Mohd Arifin Mohd Arif	BN - UMNO	6547	3510	Registered voters: 11790; Turnout: 10023 (85%); Spoilt votes: 237
Narawi Ahmad	PR - PKR	3037		Registered voters: 11790; Turnout: 10023 (85%); Spoilt votes: 237
Banjimin Ondoi	SAPP	300		Registered voters: 11790; Turnout: 10023 (85%); Spoilt votes: 237
Jaapar Ag Gador	STAR	139		Registered voters: 11790; Turnout: 10023 (85%); Spoilt votes: 237
N25 - KLIAS
Mohd Sanusi Taripin	SAPP	182		Registered voters: 15337; Turnout: 13064 (85,2%); Spoilt votes: 342
Aliapa Osman	STAR	71		Registered voters: 15337; Turnout: 13064 (85,2%); Spoilt votes: 342
Lajim Ukin	PR - PKR	6324	179	Registered voters: 15337; Turnout: 13064 (85,2%); Spoilt votes: 342
Isnin Aliasnih	BN - UMNO	6145		Registered voters: 15337; Turnout: 13064 (85,2%); Spoilt votes: 342
N26 - KUALA PENYU
Jusbian Kenneth	Independent	44		Registered voters: 14776; Turnout: 12889 (87,2%); Spoilt votes: 250
Limus Jury	BN - UPKO	7311	2273	Registered voters: 14776; Turnout: 12889 (87,2%); Spoilt votes: 250
Johan OT Ghani	PR - PKR	5038		Registered voters: 14776; Turnout: 12889 (87,2%); Spoilt votes: 250
Ining Sintin	STAR	154		Registered voters: 14776; Turnout: 12889 (87,2%); Spoilt votes: 250
Md Tajuddin Md Walli	Independent	92		Registered voters: 14776; Turnout: 12889 (87,2%); Spoilt votes: 250
N27 - LUMADAN
Abdul Rahman Md Yakub	PR - PKR	2303		Registered voters: 13797; Turnout: 11722 (85%); Spoilt votes: 246
Jamain Sarudin	SAPP	143		Registered voters: 13797; Turnout: 11722 (85%); Spoilt votes: 246
Rapahi Edris	Independent	2476		Registered voters: 13797; Turnout: 11722 (85%); Spoilt votes: 246
Kamarlin Ombi	BN - UMNO	6338	3862	Registered voters: 13797; Turnout: 11722 (85%); Spoilt votes: 246
Saudi Suhaili	Independent	69		Registered voters: 13797; Turnout: 11722 (85%); Spoilt votes: 246
Mohd Jaafar Ibrahim	STAR	147		Registered voters: 13797; Turnout: 11722 (85%); Spoilt votes: 246
N28 - SINDUMIN
Harunsah Ibrahim	PR - PKR	3701		Registered voters: 15390; Turnout: 12587 (81,8%); Spoilt votes: 340
Semion Sakai	STAR	165		Registered voters: 15390; Turnout: 12587 (81,8%); Spoilt votes: 340
Amde Sidik	SAPP	357		Registered voters: 15390; Turnout: 12587 (81,8%); Spoilt votes: 340
Ahmad Bujang	BN - UMNO	8024	4323	Registered voters: 15390; Turnout: 12587 (81,8%); Spoilt votes: 340
N29 - KUNDASANG
Jain Sauting	STAR	1117		Registered voters: 13346; Turnout: 10295 (77,1%); Spoilt votes: 264
Cleftus Stephen Spine	Independent	87		Registered voters: 13346; Turnout: 10295 (77,1%); Spoilt votes: 264
Satiol Indong	PR - PKR	2231		Registered voters: 13346; Turnout: 10295 (77,1%); Spoilt votes: 264
Joachim Gunsalam	BN - PBS	4206	1975	Registered voters: 13346; Turnout: 10295 (77,1%); Spoilt votes: 264
Japiril Suhaimin	SAPP	2102		Registered voters: 13346; Turnout: 10295 (77,1%); Spoilt votes: 264
Sam Hondou	Independent	288		Registered voters: 13346; Turnout: 10295 (77,1%); Spoilt votes: 264
N30 - KARANAAN
Masidi Manjun	BN - UMNO	6292	3500	Registered voters: 12471; Turnout: 10353 (83%); Spoilt votes: 171
Jalidin Paidi	STAR	1067		Registered voters: 12471; Turnout: 10353 (83%); Spoilt votes: 171
Mat Jaili Samat	Independent	31		Registered voters: 12471; Turnout: 10353 (83%); Spoilt votes: 171
Muhiddin Yusin	PR - PKR	2792		Registered voters: 12471; Turnout: 10353 (83%); Spoilt votes: 171
N31 - PAGINATAN
Yazid Sahjinan	Independent	154		Registered voters: 13285; Turnout: 10772 (81,1%); Spoilt votes: 174
Siringan Gubat	BN - UPKO	5142	979	Registered voters: 13285; Turnout: 10772 (81,1%); Spoilt votes: 174
Amru Abd Kadir	PR - PKR	4163		Registered voters: 13285; Turnout: 10772 (81,1%); Spoilt votes: 174
Pedderin Tuliang	STAR	1139		Registered voters: 13285; Turnout: 10772 (81,1%); Spoilt votes: 174
N32 - TAMBUNAN
Joseph Pairin Kitingan	BN - PBS	5586	2079	Registered voters: 13775; Turnout: 11428 (83%); Spoilt votes: 192
Justin Yonsoding	Independent	591		Registered voters: 13775; Turnout: 11428 (83%); Spoilt votes: 192
Wilfred Win Ponil	PR - PKR	1744		Registered voters: 13775; Turnout: 11428 (83%); Spoilt votes: 192
Nestor Joannes	STAR	3507		Registered voters: 13775; Turnout: 11428 (83%); Spoilt votes: 192
Koh Kui Tze	Independent	63		Registered voters: 13775; Turnout: 11428 (83%); Spoilt votes: 192
N33 - BINGKOR
Ricky Sedomon	Independent	111		Registered voters: 15902; Turnout: 12908 (81,2%); Spoilt votes: 185
Ahmad Shah Hussein Tambakau	PR - PKR	2368		Registered voters: 15902; Turnout: 12908 (81,2%); Spoilt votes: 185
Kennedy Jie John	BN - UPKO	4894		Registered voters: 15902; Turnout: 12908 (81,2%); Spoilt votes: 185
Geoffrey Gapari Kitingan	STAR	5350	456	Registered voters: 15902; Turnout: 12908 (81,2%); Spoilt votes: 185
N34 - LIAWAN
Sapin Karano	BN - UMNO	5383	1752	Registered voters: 14033; Turnout: 11507 (82%); Spoilt votes: 172
Paul Bunsu Gitang	PR - PKR	3631		Registered voters: 14033; Turnout: 11507 (82%); Spoilt votes: 172
Nusleh Madarak	Independent	18		Registered voters: 14033; Turnout: 11507 (82%); Spoilt votes: 172
Pauket Yadiloh	SAPP	236		Registered voters: 14033; Turnout: 11507 (82%); Spoilt votes: 172
Nicholas James Guntobon	STAR	2067		Registered voters: 14033; Turnout: 11507 (82%); Spoilt votes: 172
N35 - MELALAP
Radin Malleh	BN - PBS	4643	2599	Registered voters: 12098; Turnout: 9825 (81,2%); Spoilt votes: 222
Roger Stimin	SAPP	2044		Registered voters: 12098; Turnout: 9825 (81,2%); Spoilt votes: 222
Noorita Sual	PR - DAP	1992		Registered voters: 12098; Turnout: 9825 (81,2%); Spoilt votes: 222
Kong Fui Seng	STAR	924		Registered voters: 12098; Turnout: 9825 (81,2%); Spoilt votes: 222
N36 - KEMABONG
Rubin Balang	BN - UMNO	5765	3032	Registered voters: 13246; Turnout: 11104 (83,8%); Spoilt votes: 404
William Ensor Tingkalor	SAPP	1047		Registered voters: 13246; Turnout: 11104 (83,8%); Spoilt votes: 404
Tay Jin Kiong	STAR	1155		Registered voters: 13246; Turnout: 11104 (83,8%); Spoilt votes: 404
Biou Suyan	PR - PKR	2733		Registered voters: 13246; Turnout: 11104 (83,8%); Spoilt votes: 404
N37 - SOOK
Ellron Angin	BN - PBRS	7223	4395	Registered voters: 16387; Turnout: 13535 (82,6%); Spoilt votes: 301
Liberty Lopog	PR - PKR	1911		Registered voters: 16387; Turnout: 13535 (82,6%); Spoilt votes: 301
Kustin Ladi	STAR	2828		Registered voters: 16387; Turnout: 13535 (82,6%); Spoilt votes: 301
Chong Yu Chee	SAPP	1226		Registered voters: 16387; Turnout: 13535 (82,6%); Spoilt votes: 301
Rusayidi Abdullah	Independent	46		Registered voters: 16387; Turnout: 13535 (82,6%); Spoilt votes: 301
N38 - NABAWAN
Bobbey Ah Fang Suan	BN - UPKO	3816	342	Registered voters: 9850; Turnout: 7844 (79,6%); Spoilt votes: 185
Sidum Manjin	MUPP	41		Registered voters: 9850; Turnout: 7844 (79,6%); Spoilt votes: 185
Raymond Ahuar	PR - PKR	3474		Registered voters: 9850; Turnout: 7844 (79,6%); Spoilt votes: 185
Fatimah Agitor	Independent	18		Registered voters: 9850; Turnout: 7844 (79,6%); Spoilt votes: 185
George Eram	STAR	310		Registered voters: 9850; Turnout: 7844 (79,6%); Spoilt votes: 185
N39 - SUGUT
Abdul Rahman Atang	Independent	1465		Registered voters: 9698; Turnout: 7175 (74%); Spoilt votes: 326
James Ratib	BN - UMNO	4285	2820	Registered voters: 9698; Turnout: 7175 (74%); Spoilt votes: 326
Pagrios Zabang	PR - PKR	647		Registered voters: 9698; Turnout: 7175 (74%); Spoilt votes: 326
Datu Kamaruddin Datu Mustapha	Independent	111		Registered voters: 9698; Turnout: 7175 (74%); Spoilt votes: 326
Masiawan Kunching	STAR	341		Registered voters: 9698; Turnout: 7175 (74%); Spoilt votes: 326
N40 - LABUK
Metah Asang	BN - PBS	7408	4526	Registered voters: 15041; Turnout: 11737 (78%); Spoilt votes: 209
Tang Yung Hi	PR - PKR	2882		Registered voters: 15041; Turnout: 11737 (78%); Spoilt votes: 209
Pinus Gondili	STAR	1238		Registered voters: 15041; Turnout: 11737 (78%); Spoilt votes: 209
N41 - GUM-GUM
Hassan Hami	STAR	301		Registered voters: 11724; Turnout: 9220 (78,6%); Spoilt votes: 180
Ahmad Thamrin Mohd Jaini	PR - PKR	3191		Registered voters: 11724; Turnout: 9220 (78,6%); Spoilt votes: 180
Zakaria Mohd Edris	BN - UMNO	5548	2357	Registered voters: 11724; Turnout: 9220 (78,6%); Spoilt votes: 180
N42 - SUNGAI SIBUGA
Musa Aman	BN - UMNO	16637	11569	Registered voters: 28057; Turnout: 22800 (81,3%); Spoilt votes: 414
Mohd Arshad Abdul	Independent	201		Registered voters: 28057; Turnout: 22800 (81,3%); Spoilt votes: 414
A M Jaffar Juana	SAPP	265		Registered voters: 28057; Turnout: 22800 (81,3%); Spoilt votes: 414
Mohd Roslan Yussof	STAR	215		Registered voters: 28057; Turnout: 22800 (81,3%); Spoilt votes: 414
Irwanshah Mustapa	PR - PKR	5068		Registered voters: 28057; Turnout: 22800 (81,3%); Spoilt votes: 414
N43 - SEKONG
Musah Ghani	PR - PKR	3368		Registered voters: 14234; Turnout: 11121 (78,1%); Spoilt votes: 351
Ahmad Ibrahim	STAR	100		Registered voters: 14234; Turnout: 11121 (78,1%); Spoilt votes: 351
Awang Othman	SAPP	354		Registered voters: 14234; Turnout: 11121 (78,1%); Spoilt votes: 351
Datu Ilahan Datu Amilbangsa	Independent	50		Registered voters: 14234; Turnout: 11121 (78,1%); Spoilt votes: 351
Samsudin Yahya	BN - UMNO	6898	3530	Registered voters: 14234; Turnout: 11121 (78,1%); Spoilt votes: 351
N44 - KARAMUNTING
Chong Ket Kiun	PR - DAP	5380		Registered voters: 15972; Turnout: 12245 (76,7%); Spoilt votes: 278
Yong Vui Min	SAPP	352		Registered voters: 15972; Turnout: 12245 (76,7%); Spoilt votes: 278
Charles O Pang Su Pin	BN - LDP	6235	855	Registered voters: 15972; Turnout: 12245 (76,7%); Spoilt votes: 278
N45 - ELOPURA
Liau Fook Kong	SAPP	469		Registered voters: 22317; Turnout: 16709 (74,9%); Spoilt votes: 281
Au Kam Wah	BN - Gerakan	8105	251	Registered voters: 22317; Turnout: 16709 (74,9%); Spoilt votes: 281
Hiew Vun Zin	PR - DAP	7854		Registered voters: 22317; Turnout: 16709 (74,9%); Spoilt votes: 281
N46 - TANJONG PAPAT
Poon Ming Fung	PR - DAP	4631		Registered voters: 14748; Turnout: 11181 (75,8%); Spoilt votes: 206
Yong Chie Man	SAPP	191		Registered voters: 14748; Turnout: 11181 (75,8%); Spoilt votes: 206
Tan Shu Kiah	BN - Gerakan	6153	1522	Registered voters: 14748; Turnout: 11181 (75,8%); Spoilt votes: 206
N47 - KUAMUT
Mustapa Tambuyong	PR - PKR	2989		Registered voters: 14934; Turnout: 12142 (81,3%); Spoilt votes: 350
Edward Podok	STAR	1196		Registered voters: 14934; Turnout: 12142 (81,3%); Spoilt votes: 350
Masiung Banah	BN - UPKO	7607	4618	Registered voters: 14934; Turnout: 12142 (81,3%); Spoilt votes: 350
N48 - SUKAU
Saddi Abdu Rahman	BN - UMNO	5851	4419	Registered voters: 9813; Turnout: 7813 (79,6%); Spoilt votes: 244
Aprin Musin	SAPP	89		Registered voters: 9813; Turnout: 7813 (79,6%); Spoilt votes: 244
Ahdah Sulaiman	PR - PAS	1432		Registered voters: 9813; Turnout: 7813 (79,6%); Spoilt votes: 244
Juhori Paritai	STAR	197		Registered voters: 9813; Turnout: 7813 (79,6%); Spoilt votes: 244
N49 - TUNGKU
Tsen Yun Fah	Independent	96		Registered voters: 14626; Turnout: 11305 (77,3%); Spoilt votes: 287
Shuaib Mutalib	SAPP	373		Registered voters: 14626; Turnout: 11305 (77,3%); Spoilt votes: 287
Mohd Suhaili Said	BN - UMNO	7848	5484	Registered voters: 14626; Turnout: 11305 (77,3%); Spoilt votes: 287
Johani Abd Halim	PR - PKR	2364		Registered voters: 14626; Turnout: 11305 (77,3%); Spoilt votes: 287
Johan Nul	STAR	337		Registered voters: 14626; Turnout: 11305 (77,3%); Spoilt votes: 287
N50 - LAHAD DATU
Aliandu Enjil	SAPP	912		Registered voters: 25209; Turnout: 19187 (76,1%); Spoilt votes: 451
Mohammad Yusoff Apdal	BN - UMNO	12949	8415	Registered voters: 25209; Turnout: 19187 (76,1%); Spoilt votes: 451
Hamid Awong	PR - PKR	4534		Registered voters: 25209; Turnout: 19187 (76,1%); Spoilt votes: 451
Ariffin Hamid	STAR	341		Registered voters: 25209; Turnout: 19187 (76,1%); Spoilt votes: 451
N51 - KUNAK
Abd Sattal Shafiee	Independent	64		Registered voters: 11752; Turnout: 9106 (77,5%); Spoilt votes: 295
Hussein Ibnu Hassan	Independent	1034		Registered voters: 11752; Turnout: 9106 (77,5%); Spoilt votes: 295
Kasman Karate	PR - PAS	1002		Registered voters: 11752; Turnout: 9106 (77,5%); Spoilt votes: 295
Nilwan Kabang	BN - UMNO	6394	5360	Registered voters: 11752; Turnout: 9106 (77,5%); Spoilt votes: 295
Valentine Sebastian	STAR	200		Registered voters: 11752; Turnout: 9106 (77,5%); Spoilt votes: 295
Sharif Shamsuddin Sharif Sagaf	Independent	117		Registered voters: 11752; Turnout: 9106 (77,5%); Spoilt votes: 295
N52 - SULABAYAN
Hasaman Sagaran	MUPP	227		Registered voters: 12683; Turnout: 9413 (74,2%); Spoilt votes: 499
Hussein Mumakil	Independent	347		Registered voters: 12683; Turnout: 9413 (74,2%); Spoilt votes: 499
Jaujan Sambakong	BN - UMNO	6546	5129	Registered voters: 12683; Turnout: 9413 (74,2%); Spoilt votes: 499
Mamat Barhana	Independent	74		Registered voters: 12683; Turnout: 9413 (74,2%); Spoilt votes: 499
Hermeny Murgal	PR - PKR	1417		Registered voters: 12683; Turnout: 9413 (74,2%); Spoilt votes: 499
Julkalani Abd Rahman	Independent	107		Registered voters: 12683; Turnout: 9413 (74,2%); Spoilt votes: 499
Ghazalie Pg Hindi	Independent	196		Registered voters: 12683; Turnout: 9413 (74,2%); Spoilt votes: 499
N53 - SENALLANG
Baharuddin Mustapha	Independent	164		Registered voters: 13226; Turnout: 9105 (68,8%); Spoilt votes: 326
Mohd Amin Abdul mem	PR - PKR	1516		Registered voters: 13226; Turnout: 9105 (68,8%); Spoilt votes: 326
Nasir Sakaran	BN - UMNO	7425	5909	Registered voters: 13226; Turnout: 9105 (68,8%); Spoilt votes: 326
Abdul Manang Hatib Lawari	Independent	546		Registered voters: 13226; Turnout: 9105 (68,8%); Spoilt votes: 326
Ab Karim Talip	Independent	145		Registered voters: 13226; Turnout: 9105 (68,8%); Spoilt votes: 326
N54 - BUGAYA
Abdul Hussin Kiamsin	Independent	3139		Registered voters: 15698; Turnout: 11968 (76,2%); Spoilt votes: 455
Atal Muhammad K K Abd Menang	Independent	201		Registered voters: 15698; Turnout: 11968 (76,2%); Spoilt votes: 455
Ramlee Marahaban	BN - UMNO	6642	3503	Registered voters: 15698; Turnout: 11968 (76,2%); Spoilt votes: 455
Alimin Budin	Independent	638		Registered voters: 15698; Turnout: 11968 (76,2%); Spoilt votes: 455
Hasai Tudai	PR - PAS	702		Registered voters: 15698; Turnout: 11968 (76,2%); Spoilt votes: 455
Abdullah Sani Abdul Salleh	Independent	191		Registered voters: 15698; Turnout: 11968 (76,2%); Spoilt votes: 455
N55 - BALUNG
S Abas S Ali	BN - UMNO	7843	5569	Registered voters: 13504; Turnout: 10692 (79,2%); Spoilt votes: 195
Abdul Hamid Amit Mohammad Noor	SAPP	200		Registered voters: 13504; Turnout: 10692 (79,2%); Spoilt votes: 195
Frank Salazar	PR - PKR	2274		Registered voters: 13504; Turnout: 10692 (79,2%); Spoilt votes: 195
Mohd Abdillah Timbasal	Independent	180		Registered voters: 13504; Turnout: 10692 (79,2%); Spoilt votes: 195
N56 - APAS
Tahir Dahu	SAPP	149		Registered voters: 15818; Turnout: 12455 (78,7%); Spoilt votes: 327
Chok Yit Min	STAR	75		Registered voters: 15818; Turnout: 12455 (78,7%); Spoilt votes: 327
Alizaman Jijurahman	PR - PKR	2891		Registered voters: 15818; Turnout: 12455 (78,7%); Spoilt votes: 327
Tawfiq Abu Bakar Titingan	BN - UMNO	9013	6122	Registered voters: 15818; Turnout: 12455 (78,7%); Spoilt votes: 327
N57 - SRI TANJONG
Fung Len Fui	BN - PBS	5021		Registered voters: 22151; Turnout: 16558 (74,8%); Spoilt votes: 201
Olivia Chong Oi Yun	STAR	128		Registered voters: 22151; Turnout: 16558 (74,8%); Spoilt votes: 201
Yong Ah Poh	SAPP	260		Registered voters: 22151; Turnout: 16558 (74,8%); Spoilt votes: 201
Chan Foong Hin	PR - DAP	10948	5927	Registered voters: 22151; Turnout: 16558 (74,8%); Spoilt votes: 201
N58 - MEROTAI
Mohd Manuke	Independent	342		Registered voters: 18317; Turnout: 14162 (77,3%); Spoilt votes: 238
Rita Rudianshah Abu Bakar	Independent	104		Registered voters: 18317; Turnout: 14162 (77,3%); Spoilt votes: 238
Ho Shau Vui	SAPP	221		Registered voters: 18317; Turnout: 14162 (77,3%); Spoilt votes: 238
Chin Chee Syn	Independent	1255		Registered voters: 18317; Turnout: 14162 (77,3%); Spoilt votes: 238
Pang Yuk Ming	BN - LDP	8045	4088	Registered voters: 18317; Turnout: 14162 (77,3%); Spoilt votes: 238
Ahmad Dullah	PR - PAS	3957		Registered voters: 18317; Turnout: 14162 (77,3%); Spoilt votes: 238
N59 - TANJONG BATU
Fatmawaty Mohd Yusuf	PR - PAS	3228		Registered voters: 18345; Turnout: 14338 (78,2%); Spoilt votes: 252
Hamisa Samat	BN - UMNO	10858	7630	Registered voters: 18345; Turnout: 14338 (78,2%); Spoilt votes: 252
N60 - SEBATIK
Mohammad Yusup Lewah	Independent	249		Registered voters: 10088; Turnout: 7595 (75,3%); Spoilt votes: 293
Daud Jalaluddin	PR - PAS	1344		Registered voters: 10088; Turnout: 7595 (75,3%); Spoilt votes: 293
Abd Muis Picho	BN - UMNO	5484	4140	Registered voters: 10088; Turnout: 7595 (75,3%); Spoilt votes: 293
Mohammad Jeffry Rosman	STAR	225		Registered voters: 10088; Turnout: 7595 (75,3%); Spoilt votes: 293

== Aftermath ==
Musa Aman, the leader of UMNO and BN in Sabah, were sworn in as the Chief Minister for the fourth term, on 6 May 2013. His cabinet ministers were sworn in on 9 May 2013.

This election is the only time the DAP-PAS-PKR coalition is referred as Pakatan Rakyat during the Sabah state election campaign (although each party is contesting using their own name and logo). In 2015, the PR coalition was disbanded, due to disagreements between PAS and DAP over the former's insistence to implement the Islamic penal code, known as hudud, in the State of Kelantan. As PAS has no representation in the Sabah state assembly, the split initially does not affect the opposition as only PKR and DAP (who later forms a new alliance Pakatan Harapan in 2016) together with STAR formed the opposition bloc. However several MLA for PKR and DAP later exited the party and either becoming independent, or forming/joining new party such as Sabah opposition leader Lajim Ukin who formed Parti Harapan Rakyat Sabah. Several UMNO Sabah members also exited the party in 2016, following the sacking of UMNO vice-president Shafie Apdal who later formed Parti Warisan Sabah.

== See also ==
- Results of the 2013 Malaysian state elections by constituency
