= United Sabah Assembly Party =

United Sabah Assembly Party Parti Perhimpunan Sabah Bersatu PUSAKA
- Leader: Kalakau Untol
- Founded: 1977
- Dissolved: 1978

The United Sabah Assembly Party or Malay: Parti Perhimpunan Sabah Bersatu (PUSAKA) was a political party based in Sabah, Malaysia formed by Kalakau Untol in 1977 and dissolved in 1978 after he joined Parti Bersatu Rakyat Jelata Sabah (BERJAYA).

== Election results ==
Election year	Malaysia Parliament		Outcome
Election year	Candidates	Seats won	Outcome
1978	9	0 / 154	; No representation in Parliament
1982	10	0 / 154	; No representation in Parliament

=== State election results ===
Sabah State Legislative Assembly
Election	Votes		Seats			Position	Status
Election	Count	%	Result	Won / contested	+/–	Position	Status
1981	1,984	0.6	0 / 48	0 / 9	Steady	4th	No seats

== See also ==
- Politics of Malaysia
- List of political parties in Malaysia
