= Frog (Malaysian politics) =

Term for switching parties in Malaysia

In Malaysian politics, a frog (Malay: katak politik, کاتق ڤوليتيک; Kadazandusun: buhangkut politik) refers to an act where a politician crosses the bench from one party to another (changing support). This term was first coined in during the 1994 Sabah state elections after United Sabah Party lost its majority despite winning the state elections. Despite its usage nationwide, it is more familiar within the state of Sabah. Since May 25, 2023, nine (9) states of Malaysia has approved the Parties hopping prevention law also known as the "Anti-Switching Parties Law" or "Anti-Hopping Parties Law" for both Parliament and State legislative assembly including Sabah and Sarawak.

== Origins ==
Even prior to the 1994 Sabah state elections, a series of defections made by several local politicians has brought Sabahan politics into instability. For instance, the 1985 Sabah state elections produced a PBS-led government with Joseph Pairin Kitingan being the new Chief Minister. However, some of the new government lawmakers defected to either USNO or BERJAYA, resulting in the government losing its majority.

Pairin called a new election amidst a conflict across the state. His party later won the polls with a landslide victory, wiping out BERJAYA from the state political landscape. The government continued to rule for another eight years.

During the 1994 elections, PBS was able to retained its position as the government with a narrow majority, going on to form a new government with a majority of just two seats. In just only a few months, defections brought PBS left with only five MLAs, resulting an UMNO-led Barisan Nasional state government being formed. Sakaran Dandai was sworn in as the next CM until his appointment as the Yang di-Pertua Negeri of Sabah later that year.

The term katak derives from how the frog moves, which is hopping. It is widely becoming popular as the politicians jump from one party to another.

== Examples of the usage ==
=== 2018 Sabah state election ===
The 2018 state elections produced almost a similar outcome as the 1994 elections except it was ended with a hung assembly. Neither BN nor newly formed Parti Warisan Sabah and Pakatan Harapan was able to win the 31 seats of majority as both won 29 seats, leaving the Homeland Solidarity Party as the kingmaker with two seats. At last, STAR decided to teamed up with BN, allowing Musa Aman to be reelected as the Chief Minister for a fifth consecutive term, being the only Chief Minister of Sabah to do so. Despite that, the government immediately fell apart when UPKO decided to gave its support to WARISAN-PH, bringing the support to Shafie Apdal to 35 compared with Musa which was left behind with 25 seats. Only two days later, Shafie became the new CM with support from PH and UPKO.

A series of serious defections occurred after that. Not only several component parties of BN left the coalition, most of Sabah UMNO politicians decided to cross the floor. Musa Aman was the sole UMNO MLA throughout the term, while the rest either joining the newly formed BERSATU, WARISAN or remained independent.

=== 2018 Malaysian general election ===
After the election defeat, several of UMNO leaders decided to jump to BERSATU with MP for Jeli, Mustapa Mohamed became the first MP to do so. From 54 UMNO MPs elected, the party only had 39 MPs when the Parliament dissolved.

=== 2020 Malaysian political crisis ===
During the 2020–2022 Malaysian political crisis, several MPs from PKR and Bersatu from the then-ruling Pakatan Harapan coalition switch allegiance and sided with BN and PAS to topple the PH coalition. MPs Azmin Ali, Rina Harun, and Zuraida Kamaruddin, who were prominent in this crisis, later lost their seats during the 2022 Malaysian general election.

=== 2020 Sabah state election ===
The term 'katak' was once again coined in after Musa Aman claimed that BN has a majority to form a government, resulting into some speculations that several WARISAN-PH MLA may defect to the opposition. To prove the legitimacy of the government, Shafie asked the Yang di-Pertua Negeri to dissolve the Sabah State Legislative Assembly, in which his request was accepted. However, WARISAN lost the election to another newly formed Gabungan Rakyat Sabah coalition with a majority of three seats (32 (WARISAN)-38 (GRS)) (later six as all the independent MLAs joined GRS). Hajiji Noor, leader of the GRS was sworn in as the Chief Minister.

Across the three years prior to a state political crisis, 10 MLAs defected. Most of them joining the government coalition, while only two remained in opposition.

=== 2023 Sabah political crisis ===
Following the 2022 general elections, the Sabah BERSATU within GRS decided to gave its support to Anwar Ibrahim as the Prime Minister. However, BERSATU at the federal level rejected any 'grand coalition' proposal and became the opposition. This caused a dispute and eventually led to a BERSATU Sabah breakaway. All the BERSATU Sabah MPs except Ronald Kiandee, MP for Beluran (who contested under Perikatan Nasional ticket instead of GRS) left the party.

All the state legislators joined the rebranded local party, The Parti Gagasan Rakyat Sabah (GAGASAN), while the members of the Dewan Rakyat remained direct members of GRS due to a law that forbade any lawmakers to defect.

Owing to Hajiji's decision to defect, then-Deputy Chief Minister I of Sabah, Bung Moktar Radin pulled his support for Hajiji, along with all UMNO MLAs except of five UMNO MLAs and one KDM Limbahau MLAs (The movement also known as Langkah Kinabalu or Kinabalu Move). This situation resulted a crisis which led to expulsion of Bung from his position. Later on, Shahelmy Yahya (one of five UMNO MLAs who supported Hajiji) was appointed as Deputy Chief Minister III. Hajiji also reshuffled his cabinet, in which Pakatan Harapan rejoined the government. With Pakatan Harapan and partial support from UMNO lawmakers, Hajiji resisted the crisis.

As a result, eleven MLA crossed the floor, in which the composition is as follows:

- One PBM MLA joined Barisan Nasional (UMNO)
- Five WARISAN MLA joined GAGASAN
- Five BN (UMNO) MLA joined GAGASAN,

giving Hajiji a supermajority control over the assembly. After that, UMNO and KDM decided to support the government once again except Bung Moktar Radin-sect.

On 25 May 2023, the Sabah law of anti-hopping parties finally approved in the state legislative assembly and successfully gazzeted on 8 June 2023, the end of party hopping history in Sabah.

=== Rumors about political instability in Perak ===
On May 6, 2023, Perak MB, Datuk Seri Saarani Mohamad, insisted that the state government will remain intact until the end of the term, thus advising State Assembly Members (ADUN) not to be deceived by offers and jump (hopping) parties to the detriment of their respective political futures. He commented on rumors about four state assemblymen resigning, thus causing the Perak State Unity Government between Barisan Nasional (BN) and Pakatan Harapan (PH) to lose its majority in the state assembly and be forced to re-hold the state election (PRN). Commenting further, he who is also the Chairman of BN Perak rejected the possibility that the leadership of the Perak state government will change and the desire to form a new government by the opposition in Perak cannot be achieved if the BN-PH coalition still wins at least one of the vacant state assembly seats. Saarani Mohamad, who is also a Kota Tampan State Assembly Member, admitted that he knew about the rumors of an attempt to overthrow the Perak government three weeks ago, but denied that it would happen.

== Notable persons ==
- Mohamad Ezam Mohd Nor – switching to nine political parties
- Lajim Ukin (Note: Sabah politician.) – switching to seven political parties
- Jeffrey Gapari Kitingan – switching to six political parties
- Mohd Zaid Ibrahim – switching to five political parties
- Ibrahim Ali – switching to five political parties
- Wilfred Bumburing – switching to five political parties
- Mahathir Mohamad – switching to four political parties
- Pandikar Amin Mulia – switching to four political parties
- Hajiji Noor – switching to four political parties
- Isnin Aliasnih – switching to four political parties
- Harris Mohd Salleh – switching to four political parties
- Karim Bujang – switching to four political parties
- Rubin Balang – switching to four political parties
- Sairin Karno – switching to four political parties
- Larry Sng – switching to five political parties
- Saifuddin Abdullah – switching to four political parties
- Mohammad Yahya Lampong – switching to four political parties

== See also ==
- Crossing the floor
- Aaya Ram Gaya Ram
