= 2023 Sabah political crisis =

Political crisis in Sabah, Malaysia

- Date: 6 January – 12 February 2023
- Location: Sabah, Malaysia
- Also known as: Kinabalu Move (Malay: Langkah Kinabalu)
- Cause: Attempted parliamentary coup d'état by UMNO Sabah and WARISAN; Mass resignation of BERSATU Sabah members and leaders; Expulsion of BERSATU Sabah from Gabungan Rakyat Sabah
- Participants: Members of 16th Sabah State Legislative Assembly; Chief Minister of Sabah
- Outcome: Gabungan Rakyat Sabah retains power; Hajiji remains chief minister; Bung Moktar removed as deputy chief minister; Cabinet reshuffled to include Pakatan Harapan; Takeover of GAGASAN by former BERSATU members led by Hajiji; Passing of Anti-Switching Parties Law

The 2023 Sabah political crisis or widely reported on local media as Langkah Kinabalu or the Kinabalu Move, began on 6 January 2023, when the state government of Sabah led by Gabungan Rakyat Sabah (GRS) collapsed when its coalition party Barisan Nasional (BN) withdrew its support. The Leader of UMNO Sabah, a component party of BN, Bung Moktar Radin, Kinabatangan Member of Parliament (MP) and Lamag Assemblyman, cited a lack of confidence in the leadership of Chief Minister of Sabah Hajiji Noor in the withdrawal. UMNO Sabah want to change support from supporting GRS coalition to supporting the WARISAN Plus coalition. On 9 January, both Malaysian leaders, prime minister Anwar Ibrahim and deputy prime minister Ahmad Zahid Hamidi travelled to Kota Kinabalu to meet with Sabah political leaders. This crisis resulted in the approval of the Anti-Switching Parties Law in Sabah (approved in 25 May 2023) and the GRS coalition succeeded in retaining the government.

As of 6 February, there have been no changes in the status quo regarding the government of Sabah, following the decision of 5 UMNO MLAs who publicly supported Hajiji despite Bung's decision, and a reshuffle of the state cabinet on 11 January as a result. As of 25 May 2023, Sabah State Legislative Assembly finally approved the Anti-Switching Parties Law (Anti-frogs habit).

== Background ==
=== Collapse of BN Sabah ===
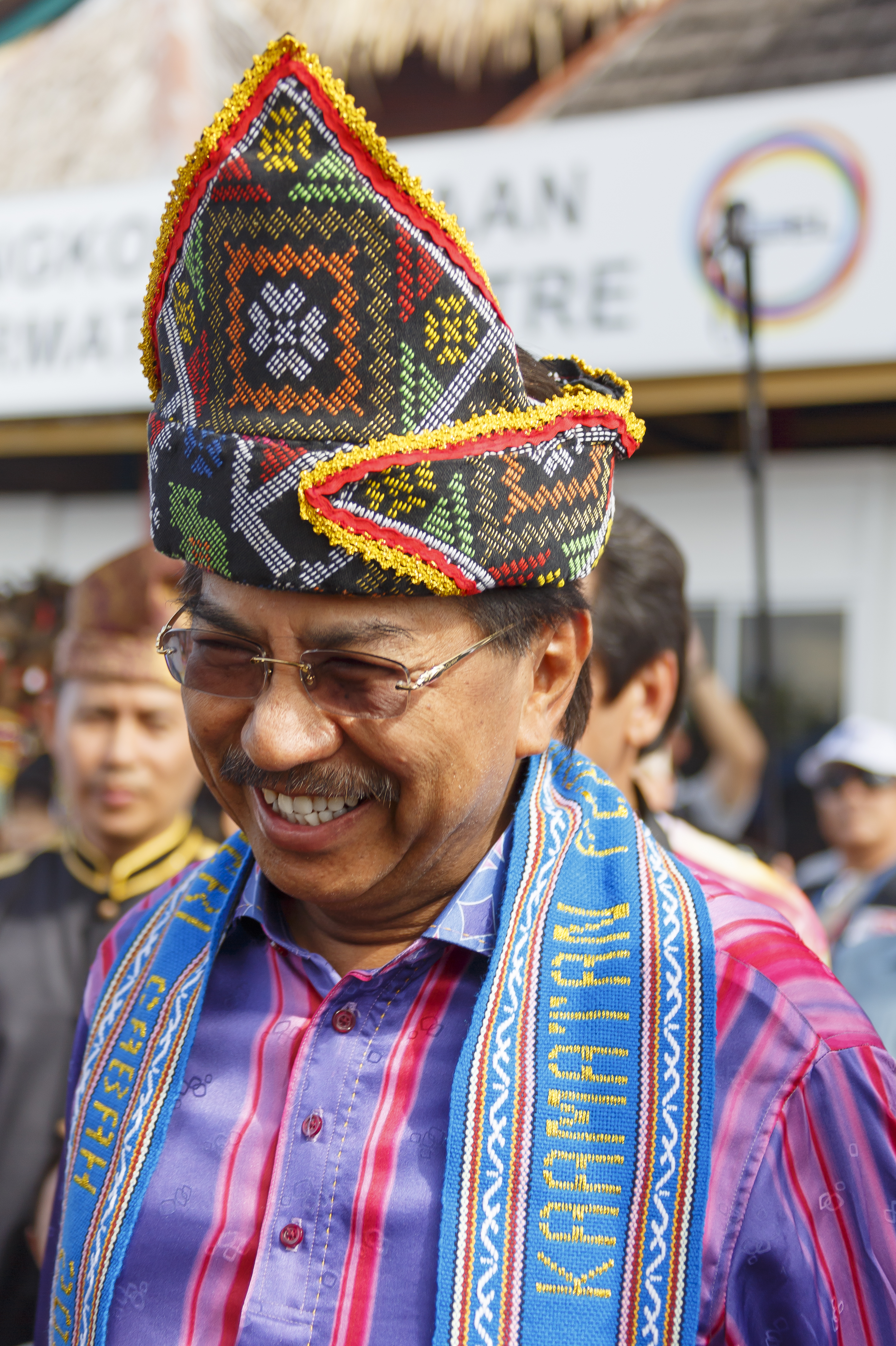
Musa Aman, previous Chief Minister (2004–2018)

In 2018, after BN's loss at the 2018 Malaysian general election at the federal level to Pakatan Harapan (PH), Sabah-based BN component parties, United Sabah Party (PBS), United Sabah People's Party (PBRS), Liberal Democratic Party (LDP) and United Pasokomomogun Kadazandusun Murut Organisation (UPKO; now a solo United Progressive Kinabalu Organization) have left BN Sabah in response to their loss, leaving only UMNO Sabah and MCA Sabah as component party; Sabah Progressive Party (SAPP) had already left the coalition in 2013. This caused Musa Aman lost his majority as Chief Minister in favour of WARISAN's Shafie Apdal.

Hajiji Noor, UMNO Sabah chairman and Sulaman Assemblyman, together with other members, including Ronald Kiandee, Azizah Mohd Dun and Masidi Manjun, have left the party in a mass resignation to joining Sabah chapter of BERSATU, stated that they want to establish a new local-based independent coalition for all Sabah-based parties to replace BN. Bung Moktar Radin, sole surviving UMNO Sabah member, said he wants to rebuild the party when elected as the new state chairman.

=== Formation of GRS and Hajiji's rise ===
In 2020, in facing of the upcoming state election, then Prime Minister Muhyiddin Yassin met Hajiji to talk about a possibility to make a new local political coalition. Hajiji officially become a founder of the new coalition and forming Gabungan Rakyat Sabah (GRS) to topple WARISAN+ government. The decision was agreed, using the formula of Gabungan Parti Sarawak (GPS), which promotes the unity between the party leaders and the people of the state.

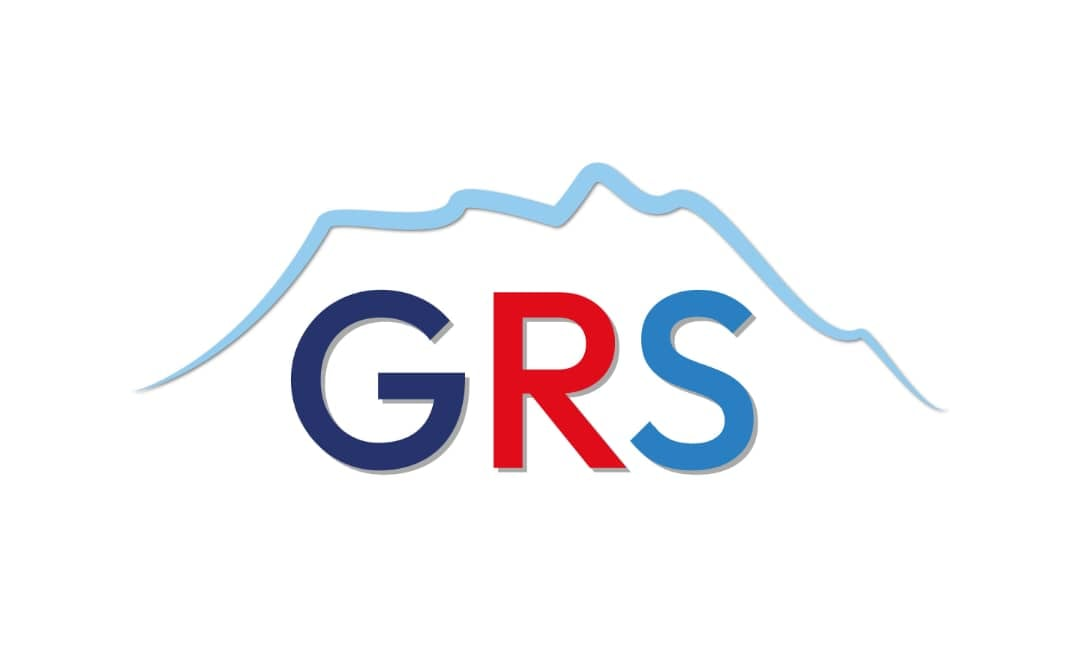
Gabungan Rakyat Sabah's official logo

Prior to the election, GRS was formally launched to the public by Muhyiddin and Hajiji, initially organised by BN, PBS and Perikatan Nasional (PN).

In that election, GRS secured 38 seats, more than the simple majority needed to form the new government, defeating WARISAN. Hajiji was officially appointed as new Chief Minister by Governor Juhar Mahiruddin in post-election, succeeding Shafie.

=== Registration of GRS ===
In 2022, the Registry of Societies (RoS) formally registered GRS as a coalition political party. At the time of its registration, the coalition, consists of PBS, SAPP, Homeland Solidarity Party (STAR), the new United Sabah National Organisation (USNO Baru) and formerly BERSATU Sabah, were the latest parties to joining it, all of them were former United Borneo Alliance (UBA) and United Alliance of Sabah (GBS) components.

A second local based coalition party in Sabah, and second in East Malaysia after Sarawak-based GPS, none of the peninsula-based parties were involved in the newly registered GRS. Hajiji Noor later elected as the first registered chairman, assisted by Masidi Manjun, Yong Teck Lee, Pandikar Amin Mulia, Jeffrey Kitingan and Joachim Gunsalam.

== Event ==
=== Mass resignation of BERSATU Sabah members and its expulsion from GRS ===
In 2023, in response to PN's defeat and also Muhyiddin's religious statement controversies (The "Christianization" remarks and racism) in the 15th general election besides his controversial rule as Prime Minister between 2020 and 2021, Hajiji announced that he and all members of BERSATU Sabah have resigned from the party, vowing to form a new political party to reclaim the autonomy of Sabah, that ultimately created Direct Members of GRS to allowing independent assemblymans to joining it. Among the members of Direct Members are Members of the Parliament. They are Ranau's Jonathan Yasin, Papar's Armizan Mohd Ali (current federal minister), Sipitang's Matbali Musah and Batu Sapi's Khairul Firdaus Akbar Khan (current federal deputy minister). The only known survived members were Ronald Kiandee and Azizah Mohd. Dun, who still pledges to the party. But later in May 2023, Azizah Mohd. Dun also become a Direct member of GRS and officially become women wing chief of GRS coalition. Juil Nuatim also officially become one of the Direct Members of Gabungan Rakyat Sabah in May 2023.

The next day, Ronald was announced as the new state party chairman and subsequently, BERSATU has been expelled from GRS due to its current position as opposition party on the national level, and GRS' distant from any political ties with PN, in which BERSATU and SAPP are associated with.

=== Pullover of BN Sabah and Shahelmey's resistance ===
In response to Hajiji's decision, Bung announced that BN Sabah has pulled their support for the Chief Minister, claiming that he had breached the party hopping prevention law. However, before Bung had made his statement, this event already had a controversy located in Kinabalu Hotel and Sabah International Convention Centre (SICC) where the UMNO Sabah leader had met WARISAN's Shafie. This controversy went viral before The BERSATU Sabah leadership mass resignation on 9 December 2022.

Later that day, he met Shafie to discuss about the possibility of forming a new coalition to ensure the Senallang Assemblyman's return to the Chief Minister's Office.

Amidst the crisis, five UMNO Sabah members, Shahelmey Yahya (Putatan MP and MLA for Tanjung Keramat), Jasnih Daya (MLA for Pantai Dalit), Yusof Yacob (MLA for Sindumin), James Ratib (MLA for Sugut) and Mohd Arsad Bistari (MLA for Tempasuk) declared their continued support of Hajiji until his term expired and denounced Bung's decision. As of result, in March and April, Shahelmey was suspended for six years by UMNO's Supreme Council for backing Hajiji (and would possibly face expulsion, depending on party's discipline codes), while James, Jasnih and Arshad was sacked from the party for party hopping.

On 21 February 2023, Yusof, along with other 8 MLAs, including the sacked UMNO members, supporting Hajiji, and at the same time, along with another UMNO defector, Hamid Awang (MLA for Balung), and former WARISAN MLAs, Mohammad Mohamarin (Banggi), Chong Chen Bin (Tanjong Kapor) and Norazlinah Arif (Kunak), they joined GAGASAN.

=== Hajiji's attempted oust and Bung Mokhtar's expulsion from cabinet ===
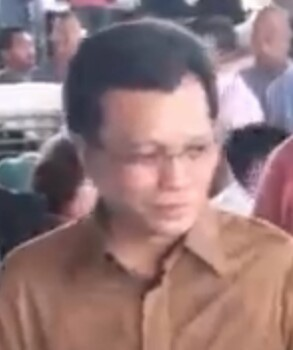
Shafie Apdal, Senallang Assemblyman, Semporna MP and former Chief Minister

On 5 January 2023, Bung Mokhtar and Shafie launched an attempt to oust Hajiji and reinstall the latter as Chief Minister.

These attempts were foiled by members of the GRS. As of result, Hajiji swaps Bung with Shahelmey for Deputy Chief Minister's post, and the Kinabatangan MP was dropped from the ruling cabinet.

=== Takeover of Gagasan Rakyat ===
On 5 February, Hajiji Noor, including other members of former BERSATU Sabah, took over a little known party called Parti Gagasan Rakyat Sabah (GAGASAN) from its previous leader, Stephen Jacob Jimbangan. On 9 December 2022, the party had already accepted him as its member prior to the first Hajiji cabinet's collapse and the party had already been accepted as GRS coalition component party. Since 27 May 2023, GRS coalition secured their seats with 42 State legislative assembly fixed seats, 2 days after "Anti-parties hopping law" been approved in Sabah on 25 May 2023.

== Response ==
=== Federal level ===
The day after the failed coup attempt, Prime Minister Anwar Ibrahim and his Deputy Prime Minister Ahmad Zahid Hamidi flew to Sabah to discuss with Hajiji about the crisis.

They advised him that he needed to either call for a fresh election or reshuffle his cabinet line-up. He decided on the latter.

=== State level ===
In the aftermath of the crisis, Hajiji made a major decision to fire the Kinabatangan MP from his cabinet line-up and replaced Bung Mokhtar with Shahelmey as the Minister of Works.

=== Party level ===
UMNO and BN Sabah, led by Bung, on January announced that they had pullover their support against Sulaman assemblyman for his responsible quit BERSATU. Later, Social Democratic Harmony Party, led by Peter Anthony, make the same decision and back supporting him shortly afterwards.

A month later, Gagasan Rakyat, a little-known 2013 political party in Sabah, had been take over by Hajiji along with others as BERSATU Sabah's replacement, citing its ability as the broader and wider party for all Sabahans to reduce the dependents of Malaya-based parties, such as UMNO-BN and especially BERSATU-PN, meanwhile at the same time retaining their survival to ensure all rights and autonomy returned to Sabah as signed in Malaysia Agreement.

On 12 February 2023, Barisan Nasional Secretary General, Zambry Abd. Kadir said Barisan Nasional decided to support the Sabah Government led by Hajiji Noor from GRS as Sabah Chief Minister.

== See also ==
- 2020–2022 Malaysian political crisis
- 2020 Sabah state election
- 2025 Perlis political crisis
- 2026 Negeri Sembilan constitutional and political crisis
