= Jasnih Daya =

Malaysian politician (born 1974)

Yang Berhormat Datuk Jasnih Daya PGDK ASDK ADK MLA
- جاسنيه دايا

Chairman of Innoprise Plantations Berhad
- Incumbent
- Assumed office 5 February 2026
- Governor: Musa Aman
- Chief Minister: Hajiji Noor
- Managing Director: Kelvin Tan Aik Pen
- Preceded by: Majin Ajing

State Assistant Minister of Finance of Sabah
- In office 8 October 2020 – 26 January 2023 Serving with Nizam Abu Bakar Titingan
- Governor: Juhar Mahiruddin
- Chief Minister: Hajiji Noor
- Minister: Hajiji Noor (Minister, 2020–2023); Masidi Manjun (Minister II, 2020–2023); Masidi Manjun (Minister, 2023)
- Preceded by: Sarifuddin Hata
- Succeeded by: Tan Lee Fatt
- Constituency: Pantai Dalit

Member of the Sabah State Legislative Assembly for Pantai Dalit
- Incumbent
- Assumed office 26 September 2020
- Preceded by: Position established
- Majority: 3,794 (2020); 3,465 (2025)

Faction represented in the Sabah State Legislative Assembly
- 2020–2023: Barisan Nasional
- 2023–: Gabungan Rakyat Sabah

Personal details
- Born: Jasnih bin Daya; 15 September 1974 (age 51) Tuaran, Sabah, Malaysia
- Citizenship: Malaysia
- Party: United Malays National Organisation of Sabah (Sabah UMNO) (until 2023); Parti Gagasan Rakyat Sabah (GAGASAN) (since 2023)
- Other political affiliations: Barisan Nasional (BN) (until 2023); Gabungan Rakyat Sabah (GRS) (since 2023)
- Spouse: Hairani Mohd Salleh
- Education: SBP Sabah
- Alma mater: Indiana State University
- Occupation: Politician

Jasnih bin Daya (born 15 September 1974) is a Malaysian politician who has served Chairman of Innoprise Plantations Berhad since February 2026, as well as Member of the Sabah State Legislative Assembly (MLA) for Pantai Dalit since September 2020. He previously served as the State Assistant Minister of Finance of Sabah in the Gabungan Rakyat Sabah (GRS) state administration under Chief Minister Hajiji Noor and Ministers Hajiji and Masidi Manjun from October 2020 to January 2023. He is a member of Parti Gagasan Rakyat Sabah (GAGASAN), a component party of the Gabungan Rakyat Sabah (GRS) coalition and formerly a member of the United Malays National Organisation of Sabah (Sabah UMNO), a branch of a component party of the Barisan Nasional (BN) coalition. He quit Sabah UMNO to join GAGASAN on 21 February 2023.

== Election results ==
Sabah State Legislative Assembly
Year	Constituency	Candidate	Votes	Pct	Opponent(s)	Votes	Pct	Ballots cast	Majority	Turnout
2020	N13 Pantai Dalit	Jasnih Daya (Sabah UMNO)	6,868	62.73%	Rakam Sijim (WARISAN)	3,074	28.06%	10,612	3,794	68.86%
2020	N13 Pantai Dalit	Jasnih Daya (Sabah UMNO)	6,868	62.73%	Muhamad Amirul Amin (PCS)	269	2.46%	10,612	3,794	68.86%
2020	N13 Pantai Dalit	Jasnih Daya (Sabah UMNO)	6,868	62.73%	Johan Jahid (IND)	244	2.23%	10,612	3,794	68.86%
2020	N13 Pantai Dalit	Jasnih Daya (Sabah UMNO)	6,868	62.73%	Peter Pikul (IND)	236	2.16%	10,612	3,794	68.86%
2020	N13 Pantai Dalit	Jasnih Daya (Sabah UMNO)	6,868	62.73%	Rusdi Saelih (LDP)	138	1.26%	10,612	3,794	68.86%
2020	N13 Pantai Dalit	Jasnih Daya (Sabah UMNO)	6,868	62.73%	Matbee @ Matbeh Ismail (USNO Baru)	74	0.68%	10,612	3,794	68.86%
2020	N13 Pantai Dalit	Jasnih Daya (Sabah UMNO)	6,868	62.73%	Awil Kamsari (GAGASAN)	46	0.42%	10,612	3,794	68.86%
2025	N13 Pantai Dalit	Jasnih Daya (GAGASAN)	8,306	44.62%	Alfian Sambas (Sabah UMNO)	4,841	26.01%	18,880	3,465	71.76%
2025	N13 Pantai Dalit	Jasnih Daya (GAGASAN)	8,306	44.62%	Aliasgar Basri (WARISAN)	2,878	15.46%	18,880	3,465	71.76%
2025	N13 Pantai Dalit	Jasnih Daya (GAGASAN)	8,306	44.62%	Francis Fahir @ Tongong (STAR)	1,282	6.89%	18,880	3,465	71.76%
2025	N13 Pantai Dalit	Jasnih Daya (GAGASAN)	8,306	44.62%	Mohd Zulkernain Osman (Sabah BERSATU)	814	4.37%	18,880	3,465	71.76%
2025	N13 Pantai Dalit	Jasnih Daya (GAGASAN)	8,306	44.62%	Jaesman @ Jaess Gipin (KDM)	387	2.08%	18,880	3,465	71.76%
2025	N13 Pantai Dalit	Jasnih Daya (GAGASAN)	8,306	44.62%	Liam Tawil (IMPIAN)	106	0.57%	18,880	3,465	71.76%

== Honours ==
- Sabah
  - Commander of the Order of Kinabalu (PGDK) – Datuk (2022)
  - Companion of the Order of Kinabalu (ASDK) (2017)
  - Member of the Order of Kinabalu (ADK) (2009)
