= James Ratib =

Malaysian politician (born 1966)

Yang Berhormat Datuk James Ratib PGDK MLA
- جيمس راتب

State Minister of Education, Science, Technology, and Innovation of Sabah
- Incumbent
- Assumed office 1 December 2025
- Governor: Musa Aman
- Chief Minister: Hajiji Noor
- Assistant: Jordan Jude Ellron
- Preceded by: Mohd Arifin Mohd Arif (as Minister of Science, Technology and Innovation)
- Constituency: Sugut

State Minister of Community Development and People's Wellbeing of Sabah
- In office 11 January 2023 – 30 November 2025
- Governor: Juhar Mahiruddin (2023–2024); Musa Aman (2025)
- Chief Minister: Hajiji Noor
- Assistant: Flovia Ng
- Preceded by: Shahelmey Yahya
- Succeeded by: Julita Mojungki (as Minister of Women, Health and Community Wellbeing)
- Constituency: Sugut

State Assistant Minister of Agriculture and Fisheries of Sabah
- In office 8 October 2020 – 11 January 2023 Serving with Hendrus Anding
- Governor: Juhar Mahiruddin
- Chief Minister: Hajiji Noor
- Minister: Jeffrey Kitingan
- Preceded by: Daud Yusof (State Assistant Minister of Agriculture and Food Industry)
- Succeeded by: Peto Galim (State Assistant Minister of Agriculture, Fisheries and Food Industries)
- Constituency: Sugut

Member of the Sabah State Legislative Assembly for Sugut
- Incumbent
- Assumed office 5 May 2013
- Preceded by: Surady Kayong (BN–UMNO)
- Majority: 2,820 (2013); 1,521 (2018); 1,664 (2020); 2,783 (2025)

Division Chairman of N48 Sugut Branch of Parti Gagasan Rakyat Sabah
- Incumbent
- Assumed office 5 February 2023
- President: Hajiji Noor

Faction represented in the Sabah State Legislative Assembly
- 2013–2018: Barisan Nasional
- 2018–2019: United Pasokmomogun Kadazandusun Murut Organisation
- 2019–2020: United Progressive Kinabalu Organisation
- 2020: Independent
- 2020–2023: Barisan Nasional
- Since 2023: Gabungan Rakyat Sabah

Personal details
- Born: James bin Ratib; 8 October 1966 (age 59) Beluran, Sabah, Malaysia
- Party: United Malays National Organisation (UMNO) (1998–May 2018, June 2020–January 2023); United Progressive Kinabalu Organisation (UPKO) (May 2018–June 2020); Parti Gagasan Rakyat Sabah (GAGASAN) (since February 2023)
- Other political affiliations: Barisan Nasional (BN) (1998–May 2018, June 2020–January 2023); Gabungan Rakyat Sabah (GRS) (since February 2023)
- Education: Asia e University
- Occupation: Politician

James bin Ratib (born 8 October 1966) is a Malaysian politician who served as the State Minister of Education, Science, Technology, and Innovation of Sabah in the Gabungan Rakyat Sabah (GRS) state administration under Chief Minister Hajiji Noor since December 2025 and State Minister of Community Development and People's Wellbeing of Sabah from January 2023 until November 2025, as well as Member of the Sabah State Legislative Assembly (MLA) for Sugut since May 2013. He previously served as the State Assistant Minister of Agriculture and Fisheries of Sabah in the GRS state administration under Hajiji and Minister Jeffrey Kitingan from October 2020 to his promotion to full ministership of a different portfolio in January 2023. He is a member and the Division Chairman of N48 Sugut of the Parti Gagasan Rakyat Sabah (GAGASAN), a major component party of the Gabungan Rakyat Sabah (GRS) coalition and was formerly a member of the United Malays National Organisation of Sabah (Sabah UMNO) and United Progressive Kinabalu Organisation (UPKO).

== Election results ==
Sabah State Legislative Assembly
| Year | Constituency | Candidate | Votes | Pct | Opponent(s) | Votes | Pct | Ballots cast | Majority | Turnout |
|---|---|---|---|---|---|---|---|---|---|---|
| 2013 | N39 Sugut | James Ratib (Sabah UMNO) | 4,285 | 62.56% | Abdul Rahman Atang (IND) | 1,465 | 21.39% | 7,175 | 2,820 | 74.20% |
| 2013 | N39 Sugut | James Ratib (Sabah UMNO) | 4,285 | 62.56% | Pagrios Zabang (PKR) | 647 | 9.45% | 7,175 | 2,820 | 74.20% |
| 2013 | N39 Sugut | James Ratib (Sabah UMNO) | 4,285 | 62.56% | Masiawan Kunching (STAR) | 341 | 4.98% | 7,175 | 2,820 | 74.20% |
| 2013 | N39 Sugut | James Ratib (Sabah UMNO) | 4,285 | 62.56% | Datu Kamaruddin Datu Mustapha (IND) | 111 | 1.62% | 7,175 | 2,820 | 74.20% |
| 2018 | N39 Sugut | James Ratib (Sabah UMNO) | 4,704 | 55.77% | Aspah Abdullah Sani (WARISAN) | 3,183 | 37.74% | 8,882 | 1,521 | 75.90% |
| 2018 | N39 Sugut | James Ratib (Sabah UMNO) | 4,704 | 55.77% | Arshad Abdul Mualaf (PPRS) | 436 | 5.17% | 8,882 | 1,521 | 75.90% |
| 2018 | N39 Sugut | James Ratib (Sabah UMNO) | 4,704 | 55.77% | Ag Osman Asibih (PKS) | 111 | 1.32% | 8,882 | 1,521 | 75.90% |
| 2020 | N48 Sugut | James Ratib (Sabah UMNO) | 4,308 | 57.88% | Norsabrina Japar (WARISAN) | 2,644 | 35.52% | 7,443 | 1,664 | 63.55% |
| 2020 | N48 Sugut | James Ratib (Sabah UMNO) | 4,308 | 57.88% | Razak Allexsius Kontuni (LDP) | 178 | 2.39% | 7,443 | 1,664 | 63.55% |
| 2020 | N48 Sugut | James Ratib (Sabah UMNO) | 4,308 | 57.88% | Raimon Lanjat (PCS) | 124 | 1.67% | 7,443 | 1,664 | 63.55% |
| 2020 | N48 Sugut | James Ratib (Sabah UMNO) | 4,308 | 57.88% | Kamaruddin Jamil (PPRS) | 86 | 1.16% | 7,443 | 1,664 | 63.55% |
| 2020 | N48 Sugut | James Ratib (Sabah UMNO) | 4,308 | 57.88% | Undang Jalang (IND) | 65 | 0.87% | 7,443 | 1,664 | 63.55% |
| 2020 | N48 Sugut | James Ratib (Sabah UMNO) | 4,308 | 57.88% | Jubin Tulawi (USNO Baru) | 38 | 0.51% | 7,443 | 1,664 | 63.55% |
| 2025 | N48 Sugut | James Ratib (GAGASAN) | 6,281 | 50.00% | Ronald Kiandee (Sabah BERSATU) | 3,498 | 27.84% | 12,836 | 2,783 | 69.68% |
| 2025 | N48 Sugut | James Ratib (GAGASAN) | 6,281 | 50.00% | Aspah Abdullah Sani (WARISAN) | 1,414 | 11.26% | 12,836 | 2,783 | 69.68% |
| 2025 | N48 Sugut | James Ratib (GAGASAN) | 6,281 | 50.00% | Mohammad Arifin Pachuk (Sabah UMNO) | 922 | 7.34% | 12,836 | 2,783 | 69.68% |
| 2025 | N48 Sugut | James Ratib (GAGASAN) | 6,281 | 50.00% | Rosely Lajun (IMPIAN) | 220 | 1.75% | 12,836 | 2,783 | 69.68% |
| 2025 | N48 Sugut | James Ratib (GAGASAN) | 6,281 | 50.00% | Roger Langgau (IND) | 143 | 1.14% | 12,836 | 2,783 | 69.68% |
| 2025 | N48 Sugut | James Ratib (GAGASAN) | 6,281 | 50.00% | Hassan Mentiak (PPRS) | 85 | 0.68% | 12,836 | 2,783 | 69.68% |

== Honours ==
- Sabah
  - Commander of the Order of Kinabalu (PGDK) – Datuk (2011)
  - Companion of the Order of Kinabalu (ASDK) (2009)
