= First Hajiji cabinet =

Malaysian cabinet

- 20th Cabinet of Sabah
- 2020–present
- Date formed: 29 September 2020
- Date dissolved: 6 October 2025

People and organisations
- Head of state: Juhar Mahiruddin (2020–2024); Musa Aman (2025)
- Head of government: Hajiji Noor (GRS)
- Deputy head of government: Jeffrey Kitingan (STAR); Joachim Gunsalam (PBS); Shahelmey Yahya (UMNO)
- Total no. of members: 11
- Member parties: Gabungan Rakyat Sabah (GRS): Direct members (GRS); Parti Gagasan Rakyat Sabah (GAGASAN); Homeland Solidarity Party (STAR); United Sabah Party (PBS); Sabah Progressive Party (SAPP); United Sabah National Organisation (USNO); Sabah People's Hope Party (PHRS); Liberal Democratic Party of Sabah (LDP); Barisan Nasional (BN): United Malays National Organisation (UMNO); Pakatan Harapan (PH): Democratic Action Party (DAP); People's Justice Party (PKR); United Progressive Kinabalu Organisation (UPKO); Perikatan Nasional (PN): Malaysian Islamic Party (PAS)
- Status in legislature: Coalition government with confidence & supply from IND
- Opposition parties: Heritage Party (WARISAN)
- Opposition leader: Mohd Shafie Apdal (WARISAN)

History
- Election: 2020 Sabah state election
- Legislature term: 16th Sabah State Legislative Assembly
- Budget: 2021, 2022, 2023, 2024
- Predecessor: Shafie cabinet
- Successor: Second Hajiji cabinet

The first Hajiji cabinet took office on 29 September 2020, three days after the 2020 Sabah State Election.

The cabinet consists of ministers and assistant ministers from the Gabungan Rakyat Sabah (GRS), Pakatan Harapan (PH) and the dissidents of Barisan Nasional (BN). BN led by then-Deputy Chief Minister I and State Minister of Works Bung Moktar Radin withdrew in January 2023, causing a political crisis. However, there were a few dissidents who did not follow BN to withdraw support for Hajiji, among them are Tanjung Keramat MLA Shahelmey Yahya who was later promoted to Deputy Chief Minister and appointed as State Minister of Works. Following this, Sabah BN is split into two factions in the government led by Shahelmey and opposition led by Bung Moktar. The crisis also saw PH joining the government after it decided to support Hajiji and allow him to regain the majority support in the assembly to remain as Chief Minister.

== Cabinet ==
=== Ministers ===
GRS (8)	PH (2)	BN (1)
GAGASAN (4); STAR (2); PBS (2)	PKR (1); DAP (1)	UMNO (1)

Portfolio	Officeholder	Party	Constituency
Chief Minister	Datuk Seri Panglima Haji Hajiji Noor	GRS (GAGASAN)	Sulaman
Deputy Chief Minister; Minister of Agriculture, Fisheries and Food Industry	Datuk Seri Panglima Dr. Jeffrey Kitingan MP	GRS (STAR)	Tambunan
Deputy Chief Minister; Minister of Housing and Local Government	Datuk Seri Panglima Dr. Joachim Gunsalam	GRS (PBS)	Kundasang
Deputy Chief Minister; Minister of Works	Datuk Ir. Shahelmey Yahya MP	BN (UMNO)	Tanjung Keramat
Minister of Finance	Datuk Seri Panglima Haji Masidi Manjun	GRS (GAGASAN)	Karanaan
Minister of Industrial Development and Entrepreneurship	Datuk Phoong Jin Zhe	PH (DAP)	Luyang
Minister of Rural Development	Datuk Jahid Jahim	GRS (PBS)	Tamparuli
Minister of Tourism, Culture and Environment	Datuk Seri Panglima Christina Liew Chin Jin	PH (PKR)	Api-Api
Minister of Community Development and People's Wellbeing	Datuk James Ratib	GRS (GAGASAN)	Sugut
Minister of Science, Technology and Innovation	Datuk Dr. Mohd Arifin Mohd Arif	GRS (GAGASAN)	Membakut
Minister of Youth and Sports	Datuk Ellron Alfred Angin	GRS (STAR)	Sook

=== Assistant Ministers ===
GRS (13)	BN (2)	PH (2)
GAGASAN (6); PBS (4); STAR (3)	UMNO (2)	PKR (1); DAP (1)

Portfolio	Name	Party	Constituency
Assistant Minister to the Chief Minister	Abidin Madingkir	GRS (STAR)	Paginatan
Assistant Minister to the Chief Minister	Nizam Abu Bakar Titingan	GRS (GAGASAN)	Apas
Assistant Minister to the Chief Minister	Ruslan Muharam	GRS (PBS)	Lumadan
Assistant Minister of Agriculture, Fisheries and Food Industry	Hendrus Anding	GRS (PBS)	Tandek
Assistant Minister of Agriculture, Fisheries and Food Industry	Peto Galim	PH (PKR)	Inanam
Assistant Minister of Housing and Local Government	Isnin Aliasnih	GRS (GAGASAN)	Klias
Assistant Minister of Works	Limus Jury	GRS (GAGASAN)	Kuala Penyu
Assistant Minister of Works	Robert Tawik	GRS (STAR)	Bingkor
Assistant Minister of Finance	Tan Lee Fatt	PH (DAP)	Likas
Assistant Minister of Finance	Julita Majungki	GRS (PBS)	Matunggong
Assistant Minister of Industrial Development and Entrepreneurship	Andi Muhammad Suryady Bandy	BN (UMNO)	Tanjung Batu
Assistant Minister of Rural Development	Samad Jambri	GRS (GAGASAN)	Labuk
Assistant Minister of Rural Development	Ruddy Awah	GRS (GAGASAN)	Pitas
Assistant Minister of Tourism, Culture and Environment	Joniston Bangkuai	GRS (PBS)	Kiulu
Assistant Minister of Community Development and People's Wellbeing	Flovia Ng	GRS (STAR)	Tulid
Assistant Minister of Science, Technology and Innovation	Harun Durabi	BN (UMNO)	Bengkoka
Assistant Minister of Youth and Sports	Fairuz Renddan	GRS (GAGASAN)	Pintasan

=== Ex-officio members ===
Position	Office bearer
Secretary	Safar Untong
Attorney-General	Nor Asiah Mohd Yusof
Financial Secretary	Mohd. Sofian Alfian Nair

== Cabinet shuffles ==
Colour key
- Joined the Cabinet
- Promoted
- Left the Cabinet

=== Ministerial Changes ===
Minister	Position before reshuffle	Result of reshuffle
11 January 2023
Hajiji Noor	Chief Minister and Minister of Finance	Chief Minister
Joachim Gunsalam	Deputy Chief Minister and Minister of Industrial Development	Deputy Chief Minister and Minister of Housing and Local Government
Shahelmey Yahya	Minister of Community Development and People's Wellbeing	Deputy Chief Minister and Minister of Works
Masidi Manjun	Minister of Housing and Local Government and Second Minister of Finance	Minister of Finance
Mohd. Arifin Mohd. Arif	Minister of Special Functions and Coordination	Minister of Science, Technology and Innovation
James Ratib	Assistant Minister of Agriculture and Fisheries	Minister of Community Development and People's Wellbeing
Phoong Jin Zhe	Backbench MLA	Minister of Industrial and Entrepreneur Development
Christina Liew Chin Jin	Backbench MLA	Minister of Tourism, Culture and Environment
Bung Moktar Radin	Deputy Chief Minister and Minister of Works	Left the government (dismissal)
Jafry Arifin	Minister of Tourism, Culture and Environment	Left the government (dismissal)
Yakubah Khan	Minister of Science, Technology and Innovation	Left the government (dismissal)

=== Assistant Ministerial Changes ===
Assistant Minister	Position before reshuffle	Result of reshuffle
21 October 2022
Wetrom Bahanda	Assistant Minister to the Chief Minister	Left the government (resigned)
26 October 2022
Nizam Abu Bakar Titingan	Assistant Minister of Finance	Given additional role as Assistant Minister to the Chief Minister
Julita Majungki	Assistant Minister of Community Development and People's Wellbeing	Assistant Minister of Finance
Fairuz Renddan	Backbench MLA	Assistant Minister of Special Functions and Coordination
11 January 2023
Nizam Abu Bakar Titingan	Assistant Minister to the Chief Minister and Assistant Minister of Finance	Assistant Minister of Finance
Harun Durabi	Assistant Minister of Rural Development	Assistant Minister of Science, Technology and Innovation
Fairuz Renddan	Assistant Minister of Special Functions and Coordination	Became Assistant Minister of Youth and Sports
Ruddy Awah	Assistant Minister of Science, Technology and Innovation	Assistant Minister of Rural Development
Andi Muhammad Suryandy Bandy	Assistant Minister of Youth and Sports	Assistant Minister of Industrial and Entrepreneur Development
Ruslan Muharam	Backbench MLA	Became Assistant Minister to the Chief Minister
Tan Lee Fatt	Backbench MLA	Assistant Minister of Finance
Peto Galim	Backbench MLA	Assistant Minister of Agriculture, Fisheries and Food Industry
