= Miss Universe Malaysia 1964 =

2nd edition of Miss Universe Malaysia

- Date: 13 June 1964
- Venue: Merdeka Stadium, Kuala Lumpur
- Director: Junior Chamber of Malaya
- Entrants: 24
- Placements: 13
- Winner: Angela Filmer; Selangor

Miss Malaysia 1964, the first edition of Miss Universe Malaysia pageant, was held on 13 June 1964 at the Merdeka Stadium, Kuala Lumpur. Angela Filmer of Selangor was crowned by the wife of then Minister of Agriculture and Co-operatives Malaysia, Tan Sri Khir Johari, Puan Khalsom Abdul Rahman at the end of the event. She then represented Malaysia at the Miss Universe 1964 pageant in Miami, Florida.

== Results ==
Final Results	Contestants
Miss Malaysia 1964	Selangor – Angela Filmer
1st Runner–Up	Singapore – Vera Wee
2nd Runner–Up	Perak – Leonie Foo
Top 13	Johore – Angeline Thio; Kedah/Perlis – Lim Choon Mei; Kelantan – Rohani Mohamad Salleh; Melaka – Luciana Lai; Negri Sembilan – Margaret Choo; Pahang – Juriah Basir; Penang – Sally Lee; Trengganu – Susan Wright

== Delegates ==
24 delegates were participated in the semi-finalist but only 13 delegates was chosen to compete in the grand finale.

- Johore - Angeline Thio, 23
- Kedah/Perlis - Lim Choon Mei, 20
- Kelantan - Rohani Mohamad Salleh, 18
- Melaka - Luciana Lai, 18
- Negri Sembilan - Margaret Choo, 19
- Pahang - Juriah Basir, 20
- Penang - Sally Lee, 19
- Perak - Leonie Foo Saw Pheng, 19
- Sarawak - Habsah Hamdan, 18
- Selangor - Angela Filmer, 19
- Singapore - Vera Wee, 22
- Trengganu - Susan Wright, 17

== Notes ==
- The next following year, Filmer went on to become the first winner of the Miss Asia 1965 pageant which was held in the Philippines.
