= Hajiji cabinet =

Hajiji cabinet may refer to:

- First Hajiji cabinet, 2020–2025
- Second Hajiji cabinet, 2025–present
