= Aksyah Nasrah =

Malaysian politician

Aksyah Nasrah ASDK BSK
- اكسياه ناصره

2nd State Deputy Chairman of the Malaysian United Indigenous Party of Sabah
- In office 10 December 2022 – 28 December 2024
- National President: Muhyiddin Yassin
- State Chairman: Hajiji Noor; Ronald Kiandee
- Preceded by: Masidi Manjun
- Succeeded by: Muhammad Affan Jumahat

Personal details
- Born: 21 September 1976 (age 49) Sabah, Malaysia
- Party: Malaysian United Indigenous Party of Sabah (BERSATU Sabah) (–2024); Independent (IND) (2024–present)
- Other political affiliations: Perikatan Nasional (PN) (–2024)

Aksyah bin Nasrah is a Malaysian politician who served as State Deputy Chairman of the Malaysian United Indigenous Party of Sabah from December 2022 to his resignation from the party in December 2024. He was a member of the Malaysian United Indigenous Party of Sabah (BERSATU Sabah), a component party of Perikatan Nasional (PN) coalitions.

== Political career ==
In 2012, he was stated that he has quit as UMNO Youth Chief in Sabah a long time ago as he appointed as Deputy Director of the Operations of Sabah Election Commission (EC). In 2018, MP for Kinabatangan, Bung Moktar's son Mohd Kurniawan Naim Moktar succeed him as Kinabatangan UMNO Youth Chief, as Aksyah Nasrah exceeded the age limit for Umno Youth members. Aksyah Nasrah announced quit BERSATU Sabah in 2024, citing personal reasons. He also pledged his support to Hajiji Noor's GRS coalitions.

== Honours ==
- Sabah
  - Companion of the Order of Kinabalu (ASDK) (2022)
  - Grand Star of the Order of Kinabalu (BSK) (2016)
