= Minister of Agriculture and Food Security (Malaysia) =

Ministry of the Government of Malaysia that is responsible for Agriculture and Food

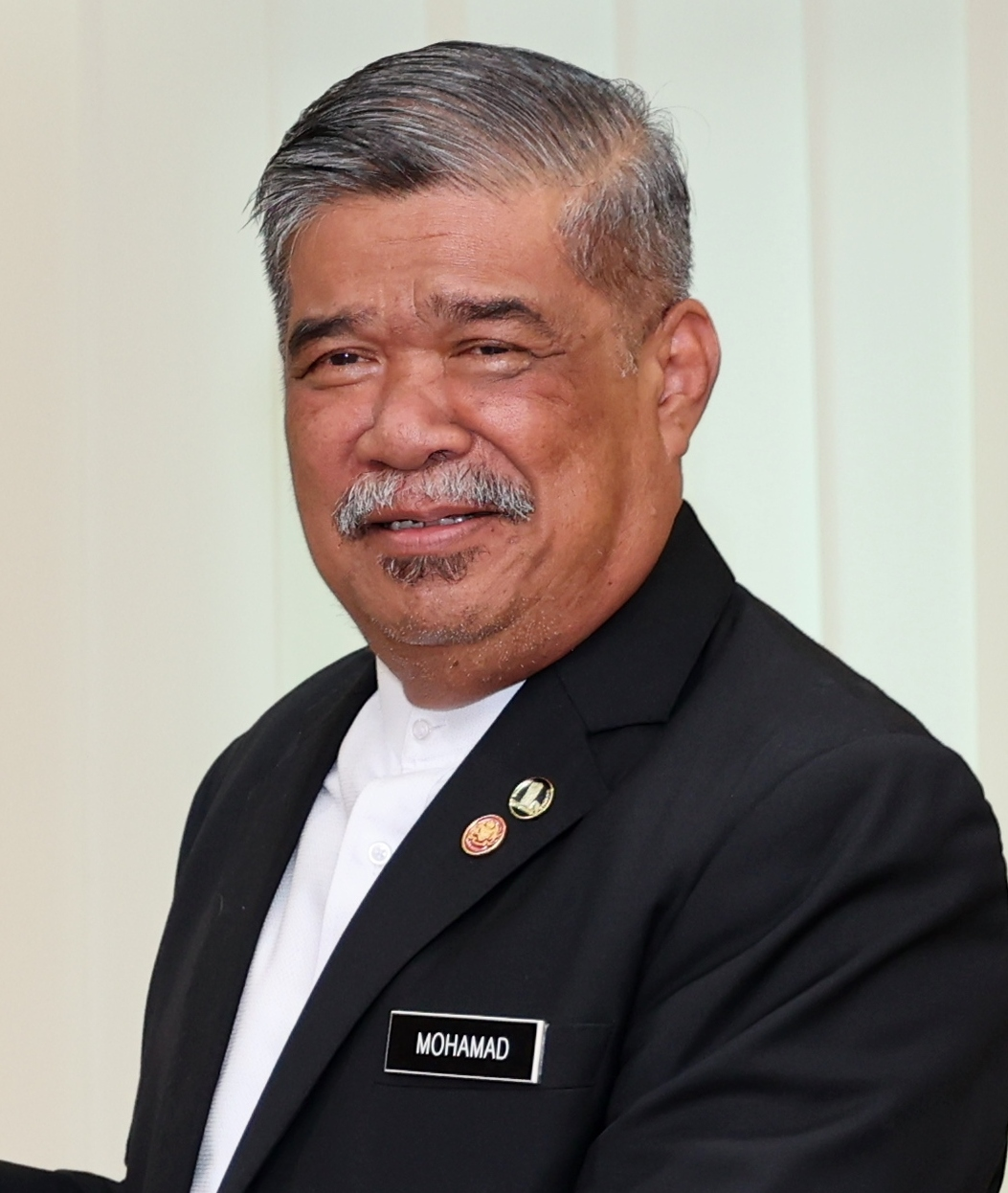
- Incumbent; Mohamad Sabu since 3 December 2022
- Ministry of Agriculture and Food Industries
- Style: Yang Berhormat Menteri (The Honourable Minister)
- Abbreviation: MAFS/KPKM
- Member of: Cabinet of Malaysia
- Reports to: Parliament of Malaysia
- Seat: Putrajaya
- Appointer: Yang di-Pertuan Agong on the recommendation of the Prime Minister of Malaysia
- Formation: 1955
- First holder: Abdul Aziz Ishak as Minister of Agriculture and Co-operatives
- Deputy: Chan Foong Hin
- Website: www.kpkm.gov.my

The Minister of Agriculture and Food Security of Malaysia is Mohamad Sabu, since 3 December 2022. Mohamad is assisted by Deputy Minister. The Minister administers the portfolio through the Ministry of Agriculture and Food Security.

== List of ministers ==
=== Agriculture ===
The following individuals have been appointed as Minister of Agriculture, or any of its precedent titles:

Political party: Alliance/BN PH PN

Portrait	Name (Birth–Death) Constituency	Political party	Title	Took office	Left office	Deputy Minister	Prime Minister (Cabinet)
	Abdul Aziz Ishak; MP for Selangor Barat (1955–1959); MP for Kuala Langat (1959–1964)	Alliance (UMNO)	Minister of Agriculture; Minister of Agriculture and Co-operatives	1955	1962	Vacant	Chief Minister of the Federation of Malaya; Tunku Abdul Rahman (I · II)
	Khir Johari (1923–2006); MP for Kedah Tengah	Alliance (UMNO)	Minister of Agriculture and Co-operatives	1963	1965	Vacant	Tunku Abdul Rahman (II · III)
	Mohamed Ghazali Jawi (1924–1982); MP for Ulu Perak (1966-1969); MP for Kuala Kangsar (1969-1974)	Alliance (UMNO)	Minister of Agriculture and Co-operatives	1966	1973	Vacant	Tunku Abdul Rahman (III); Abdul Razak Hussein (I)
	Mohamed Ghazali Jawi (1924–1982); MP for Ulu Perak (1966-1969); MP for Kuala Kangsar (1969-1974)	Alliance (UMNO)	Minister of Agriculture and Land	1966	1973	Vacant	Tunku Abdul Rahman (III); Abdul Razak Hussein (I)
	Mohamed Ghazali Jawi (1924–1982); MP for Ulu Perak (1966-1969); MP for Kuala Kangsar (1969-1974)	BN (UMNO)	Minister of Agriculture and Fisheries	1973	1974	Vacant	Abdul Razak Hussein (I)
	Abdul Ghafar Baba (1925–2006); MP for Alor Gajah	BN (UMNO)	Minister of Agriculture and Rural Development	1974	1976	Mustapha Abdul Jabar	Abdul Razak Hussein (II)
	Ali Ahmad (1930–1977); MP for Pontian	BN (UMNO)	Minister of Agriculture and Rural Development	1976	1977	Mustapha Abdul Jabar	Hussein Onn (I)
	Shariff Ahmad (b. unknown); MP for Jerantut	BN (UMNO)	Minister of Agriculture	1978	1980	Edmund Langgu Saga	Hussein Onn (I · II)
	Abdul Manan Othman (d. 2017); MP for Kuala Trengganu	BN (UMNO)	Minister of Agriculture	1980	1984	Edmund Langgu Saga (1980–1982); Chin Hon Ngian (1982–1983); Luhat Wan (1982–1984); Goh Cheng Teik (1983–1984)	Hussein Onn (II); Mahathir Mohamad (I · II)
	Anwar Ibrahim (b. 1947); MP for Permatang Pauh	BN (UMNO)	Minister of Agriculture	1984	1986	Luhat Wan; Goh Cheng Teik	Mahathir Mohamad (II)
	Sanusi Junid (1943–2018); MP for Jerlun-Langkawi	BN (UMNO)	Minister of Agriculture	1986	1995	Alexander Lee Yu Lung (1986–1989); Luhat Wan (1986–1987); Mohd Kassim Ahmed (1987–1990); Subramaniam Sinniah (1989–1990); T Marimuthu (1993–1995)	Mahathir Mohamad (III · IV)
	Sulaiman Daud (1933–2010); MP for Petra Jaya	BN (PBB)	Minister of Agriculture	1995	1999	Tengku Mahmud Tengku Mansor	Mahathir Mohamad (V)
	Mohd Effendi Norwawi (b. 1948); MP for Kuala Rajang	BN (PBB)	Minister of Agriculture	December 1999	January 2004	Mohd Shariff Omar	Mahathir Mohamad (VI); Abdullah Ahmad Badawi (I)
	Muhyiddin Yassin (b. 1947); MP for Pagoh	BN (UMNO)	Minister of Agriculture and Agro-based Industry	January 2004	18 March 2008	Mohd Shariff Omar (2004–2008); Kerk Choo Ting (2004–2006); Mah Siew Keong (2006–2008)	Abdullah Ahmad Badawi (II)
	Mustapa Mohamed (b. 1950); MP for Jeli	BN (UMNO)	Minister of Agriculture and Agro-based Industry	19 March 2008	9 April 2009	Rohani Abdul Karim	Abdullah Ahmad Badawi (III)
	Noh Omar (b. 1958); MP for Tanjong Karang	BN (UMNO)	Minister of Agriculture and Agro-based Industry	10 April 2009	15 May 2013	Rohani Abdul Karim (2009–2010); Mohd Johari Baharum (2009–2013); Chua Tee Yong (2010–2013)	Najib Razak (I)
	Ismail Sabri Yaakob (b. 1960); MP for Bera	BN (UMNO)	Minister of Agriculture and Agro-based Industry	16 May 2013	29 July 2015	Tajuddin Abdul Rahman	Najib Razak (II)
	Ahmad Shabery Cheek (b. 1958); MP for Kemaman	BN (UMNO)	Minister of Agriculture and Agro-based Industry	29 July 2015	9 May 2018	Tajuddin Abdul Rahman (2015–2018); Nogeh Gumbek (2015–2018)	Najib Razak (II)
	Salahuddin Ayub (1961–2023); MP for Pulai	PH (AMANAH)	Minister of Agriculture and Agro-based Industry	21 May 2018	24 February 2020	Sim Tze Tzin	Mahathir Mohamad (VII)
	Dr. Ronald Kiandee (b. 1961); MP for Beluran	PN (BERSATU)	Minister of Agriculture and Food Industries	10 March 2020	24 November 2022	Ahmad Hamzah (2020–2022); Che Abdullah Mat Nawi (2020–2021); Nik Muhammad Zawawi Salleh (2021–2022)	Muhyiddin Yassin (I); Ismail Sabri Yaakob (I)
	Mohamad Sabu (b. 1954); MP for Kota Raja	PH (AMANAH)	Minister of Agriculture and Food Security	3 December 2022	Incumbent	Chan Foong Hin (2022–2023); Arthur Joseph Kurup (2023–2025); Chan Foong Hin (2025–present)	Anwar Ibrahim (I)

=== Food security ===
The following individuals have been appointed as Minister of Food Security, or any of its precedent titles:

Political party: PH

Portrait	Name (Birth–Death) Constituency	Political party	Title	Took office	Left office	Deputy Minister	Prime Minister (Cabinet)
	Mohamad Sabu (b. 1954); MP for Kota Raja	PH (AMANAH)	Minister of Agriculture and Food Security	3 December 2022	Incumbent	Chan Foong Hin (2022–2023); Arthur Joseph Kurup (2023–2025); Chan Foong Hin (2025–present)	Anwar Ibrahim (I)

=== Food industries ===
The following individuals have been appointed as Minister of Food Industries, or any of its precedent titles:

Political party: PN

Portrait	Name (Birth–Death) Constituency	Political party	Title	Took office	Left office	Deputy Minister	Prime Minister (Cabinet)
	Dr. Ronald Kiandee (b.1961); MP for Beluran	PN (BERSATU)	Minister of Agriculture and Food Industries	10 March 2020	24 November 2022	Ahmad Hamzah (2020–2022); Che Abdullah Mat Nawi (2020–2021); Nik Muhammad Zawawi Salleh (2021–2022)	Muhyiddin Yassin (I); Ismail Sabri Yaakob (I)

=== Agro-based industry ===
The following individuals have been appointed as Minister of Food Industries, or any of its precedent titles:

Political party: BN PH PN

Portrait	Name (Birth–Death) Constituency	Political party	Title	Took office	Left office	Deputy Minister	Prime Minister (Cabinet)
	Muhyiddin Yassin (b. 1947); MP for Pagoh	BN (UMNO)	Minister of Agriculture and Agro-based Industry	January 2004	18 March 2008	Mohd Shariff Omar (2004–2008); Kerk Choo Ting (2004–2006); Mah Siew Keong (2006–2008)	Abdullah Ahmad Badawi (II)
	Mustapa Mohamed (b. 1950); MP for Jeli	BN (UMNO)	Minister of Agriculture and Agro-based Industry	19 March 2008	9 April 2009	Rohani Abdul Karim	Abdullah Ahmad Badawi (III)
	Noh Omar (b. 1958); MP for Tanjong Karang	BN (UMNO)	Minister of Agriculture and Agro-based Industry	10 April 2009	15 May 2013	Rohani Abdul Karim (2009–2010); Mohd Johari Baharum (2009–2013); Chua Tee Yong (2010–2013)	Najib Razak (I)
	Ismail Sabri Yaakob (b. 1960); MP for Bera	BN (UMNO)	Minister of Agriculture and Agro-based Industry	16 May 2013	29 July 2015	Tajuddin Abdul Rahman	Najib Razak (II)
	Ahmad Shabery Cheek (b. 1958); MP for Kemaman	BN (UMNO)	Minister of Agriculture and Agro-based Industry	29 July 2015	9 May 2018	Tajuddin Abdul Rahman (2015–2018); Nogeh Gumbek (2015–2018)	Najib Razak (II)
	Salahuddin Ayub (1961–2023); MP for Pulai	PH (AMANAH)	Minister of Agriculture and Agro-based Industry	21 May 2018	24 February 2020	Sim Tze Tzin	Mahathir Mohamad (VII)

=== Fisheries ===
The following individuals have been appointed as Minister of Fisheries, or any of its precedent titles:

Political party: BN

Portrait	Name (Birth–Death) Constituency	Political party	Title	Took office	Left office	Deputy Minister	Prime Minister (Cabinet)
	Mohamed Ghazali Jawi (1924–1982); MP for Kuala Kangsar	BN (UMNO)	Minister of Agriculture and Fisheries	1973	1974	Vacant	Abdul Razak Hussein (I)
