= Beluran (federal constituency) =

Federal constituency in Sabah, Malaysia

Beluran (P183)
Sabah constituency

Federal constituency
- Legislature: Dewan Rakyat
- MP: Ronald Kiandee; PN
- Constituency created: 1994
- First contested: 1995
- Last contested: 2022

Demographics
- Population (2020): 101,066
- Electors (2025): 47,964
- Area (km²): 7,448
- Pop. density (per km²): 13.6

Beluran is a federal constituency in Sandakan Division (Telupid District and Beluran District), Sabah, Malaysia, that has been represented in the Dewan Rakyat since 1995.

The federal constituency was created in the 1994 redistribution and is mandated to return a single member to the Dewan Rakyat under the first past the post voting system.

== Demographics ==
https://ge15.orientaldaily.com.my/seats/sabah/p

Ethnic breakdown of Beluran's electorate as of 2022
1. Sabah Bumiputera (72.8%)
2. Malay-Muslim Bumiputera (18.5%)
3. Other ethnicities (5.90%)
4. Chinese (2.80%)

As of 2020, Beluran has a population of 101,066 people.

Age breakdown of Beluran's electorate as of 2022
1. 18-20 (8.21%)
2. 21-29 (26.2%)
3. 30-39 (24.0%)
4. 40-49 (16.0%)
5. 50-59 (12.0%)
6. 60-69 (7.60%)
7. 70-79 (3.50%)
8. 80-89 (1.62%)
9. above 90 (0.82%)
Gender breakdown of Beluran's electorate as of 2022
1. Male (51.0%)
2. Female (49.0%)

== History ==
=== Polling districts ===
According to the gazette issued on 21 November 2025, the Beluran constituency has a total of 37 polling districts.

State constituency	Polling Districts	Code	Location
Telupid (N47）	Ulu Sapi	183/47/01	SK Ulu Sapi
Telupid (N47）	Lidong	183/47/02	SK Lidong
Telupid (N47）	Nangoh	183/47/03	SK Nangoh; SK Perancangan
Telupid (N47）	Kiabau	183/47/04	SK Kiabau
Telupid (N47）	Barayong	183/47/05	SK Berayung; SK Buis
Telupid (N47）	Wonod	183/47/06	SK Kopuron; SK Wonod
Telupid (N47）	Telupid	183/47/07	SK Pekan Telupid; SK Telupid
Telupid (N47）	Tongkungan	183/47/08	SK Tangkungon
Sugut (N48)	Jambongan Utara	183/48/01	SK Jambongan
Sugut (N48)	Golong	183/48/02	SK Golong
Sugut (N48)	Paitan Barat	183/48/03	SMK Simpangan
Sugut (N48)	Terusan Sugut	183/48/04	SK Terusan Sugut
Sugut (N48)	Alungai	183/48/05	Balai Raya Timpus
Sugut (N48)	Lingkabau Utara	183/48/06	Balai Raya Kampung Mangkasulap
Sugut (N48)	Lingkabau Selatan	183/48/07	SK Lingkabau; SK Monopod
Sugut (N48)	Sungai-Sungai	183/48/08	SK Sungai-Sungai
Sugut (N48)	Pamol	183/48/09	SMK Pamol
Sugut (N48)	Botitian	183/48/10	SK Botition
Sugut (N48)	Malalin	183/48/11	SK Malalin
Sugut (N48)	Bawang	183/48/12	SK Bawang; SK Tangkarason
Sugut (N48)	Tanjung Nipis	183/48/13	SK Tanjung Nipis
Sugut (N48)	Lubang Buaya	183/48/14	SK Lubang Buaya
Sugut (N48)	Obah	183/48/15	SK Obah
Sugut (N48)	Pantai Boring	183/48/16	Mini Dewan Kampung Pantai Boring
Sugut (N48)	Tampat	183/48/17	SK Tampat
Sugut (N48)	Dalamas	183/48/18	SK Simpangan
Sugut (N48)	Nakadong	183/48/19	Balai Raya Kampung Nakadong; Balai Raya Kampung Tagapalang
Sugut (N48)	Abuan	183/48/20	SK Abuan
Sugut (N48)	Binsulung	183/48/21	SK Binsung
Labuk (N49)	Kaniogan	183/49/01	SK Keniogan
Labuk (N49)	Tetabuan	183/49/02	SK Tetabuan
Labuk (N49)	Kolapis	183/49/03	SK Kolapis
Labuk (N49)	Klagan	183/49/04	SK Bukit Besi
Labuk (N49)	Sapi	183/49/05	SK Holy Cross
Labuk (N49)	Sungai Nangka	183/49/06	SK Sungai Nangka; SK Balaban Jaya
Labuk (N49)	Pekan Beluran	183/49/07	SMK Beluran
Labuk (N49)	Muanad	183/49/08	SMK Beluran II; SK Pekan Beluran

=== Representation history ===
Members of Parliament for Beluran
Parliament	No	Years	Member	Party	Vote Share
Constituency created, renamed from Jambongan
9th	P159	1995–1999	Asmat Nungka	BN (UMNO)	5,868; 50.82%
10th	P159	1999–2004	Ronald Kiandee	BN (UMNO)	6,562; 54.38%
11th	P183	2004–2008	Ronald Kiandee	BN (UMNO)	Uncontested
12th	P183	2008–2013	Ronald Kiandee	BN (UMNO)	7,090; 59.86%
13th	P183	2013–2018	Ronald Kiandee	BN (UMNO)	13,174; 71.75%
14th	P183	2018	Ronald Kiandee	BN (UMNO)	13,007; 62.84%
14th	P183	2018–2019	Ronald Kiandee	Independent	13,007; 62.84%
14th	P183	2019–2020	Ronald Kiandee	PH (BERSATU)	13,007; 62.84%
14th	P183	2020–2022	Ronald Kiandee	PN (BERSATU)	13,007; 62.84%
15th	P183	2022–present	Ronald Kiandee	PN (BERSATU)	11,303; 38.53%

=== State constituency ===
Parliamentary constituency	State constituency					
Parliamentary constituency	1967–1974	1974–1985	1985–1995	1995–2004	2004–2020	2020–present
Beluran				Labuk		
Beluran				Sugut		
Beluran						Telupid

=== Historical boundaries ===
State Constituency	Area		
State Constituency	1994	2003	2019
Labuk	Beluran; Kampong Kaniogan; Labuk; Semawang; Telupid	Beluran; Kampong Kaniogan; Labuk; Ulu Sapi; Telupid	Beluran; Kampong Kaniogan; Kuala Sapi; Labuk; Tagahan
Sugut	Jambongan; Lingkabau; Paitan; Pamol; Sugut		
Telupid			Kampong Peraganpang; Kiabau; Naki; Telupid; Ulu Sapi

=== Current state assembly members ===
No.	State Constituency	Member	Coalition (Party)
N47	Telupid	Jonnybone Kurum	GRS (PBS)
N48	Sugut	James Ratib	GRS (GAGASAN)
N49	Labuk	Samad Jambri	GRS (GAGASAN)

=== Local governments & postcodes ===
No.	State Constituency	Local Government	Postcode
N47	Telupid	Telupid District Council; Beluran District Council	89100 Telupid; 90100, 90400 Beluran
N48	Sugut	Telupid District Council; Beluran District Council	89100 Telupid; 90100, 90400 Beluran
N49	Labuk	Telupid District Council; Beluran District Council	89100 Telupid; 90100, 90400 Beluran

== Election results ==
Malaysian general election, 2022
Party	Candidate	Votes	%	∆%
PN	Ronald Kiandee	11,303	38.53	▲38.53
BN	Benedict Asmat	9,709	33.10	▼29.74
PH	Felix Joseph Saang	4,460	15.20	▲15.20
Heritage	Rowiena Rasid	3,707	12.64	▼15.83
PEJUANG	Hausing Sudin @ Samsudin	155	0.53	▲0.53
Total valid votes		29,334	100.00	
Total rejected ballots		534		
Unreturned ballots		83		
Turnout		29,951	65.58	▼10.21
Registered electors		44,727		
Majority		1,594	5.43	▼28.95
PN gain from BN		Swing		?
Source(s) https://lom.agc.gov.my/ilims/upload/portal/akta/outputp/1753262/PUB619_2022.pdf

Malaysian general election, 2018
Party	Candidate	Votes	%	∆%
BN	Ronald Kiandee	13,007	62.84	▼8.91
Sabah Heritage Party	Japar Zairun	5,892	28.47	▲28.47
Sabah People's Hope Party	Sipin Kadandi	996	4.81	▲4.81
Love Sabah Party	Toidy Luit	284	1.37	▲1.37
Sabah People's Unity Party	Lem @ Salim Matin	273	1.32	▲1.32
Independent	Salimah Oyong	246	1.19	▲1.19
Total valid votes		20,698	100.00	
Total rejected ballots		832		
Unreturned ballots		76		
Turnout		21,606	75.79	▼0.83
Registered electors		28,509		
Majority		7,115	34.38	▼20.02
BN hold		Swing		
Source(s) "His Majesty's Government Gazette - Notice of Contested Election, Parliament for the State of Sabah [P.U. (B) 246/2018]" (PDF). Attorney General's Chambers of Malaysia. 3 May 2018. "Federal Government Gazette - Results of Contested Election and Statements of the Poll after the Official Addition of Votes, Parliamentary Constituencies for the State of Sabah [P.U. (B) 320/2018]" (PDF). Attorney General's Chambers of Malaysia. 28 May 2018. Archived from the original (PDF) on 29 December 2019.

Malaysian general election, 2013
Party	Candidate	Votes	%	∆%
BN	Ronald Kiandee	13,174	71.75	▲11.89
PKR	James Miki	3,186	17.35	▲6.62
STAR	Raimon Lanjat	1,460	7.95	▲7.95
Independent	Kamaruddin Mustapha	542	2.95	▲2.95
Total valid votes		18,362	100.00	
Total rejected ballots		552		
Unreturned ballots		1		
Turnout		18,915	76.62	▲12.24
Registered electors		24,688		
Majority		9,988	54.40	▲17.66
BN hold		Swing		
Source(s) "Federal Government Gazette - Notice of Contested Election, Parliament for the State of Sabah [P.U. (B) 183/2013]" (PDF). Attorney General's Chambers of Malaysia. 26 April 2013. Archived from the original (PDF) on 30 September 2018. "Federal Government Gazette - Results of Contested Election and Statements of the Poll after the Official Addition of Votes, Parliamentary Constituencies for the State of Sabah [P.U. (B) 224/2013]" (PDF). Attorney General's Chambers of Malaysia. 22 May 2013. Archived from the original (PDF) on 30 September 2018.

Malaysian general election, 2008
Party	Candidate	Votes	%	∆%
BN	Ronald Kiandee	7,090	59.86	
Independent	Ramsah Tasim @ Ramsah Tashim	2,738	23.12	
PKR	Michael @ Radio Luban	1,271	10.73	
Independent	Petrus Rining	571	4.82	
Independent	Nordin Kaning	175	1.48	
Total valid votes		11,845	100.00	
Total rejected ballots		468		
Unreturned ballots		36		
Turnout		12,349	64.38	
Registered electors		19,181		
Majority		4,352	36.74	
BN hold		Swing		

Malaysian general election, 2004
Party	Candidate	Votes	%	∆%
On the nomination day, Ronald Kiandee won uncontested.
BN	Ronald Kiandee			
Total valid votes			100.00	
Total rejected ballots				
Unreturned ballots				
Turnout				
Registered electors		18,960		
Majority				
BN hold		Swing		

Malaysian general election, 1999
Party	Candidate	Votes	%	∆%
BN	Ronald Kiandee	6,562	54.38	▲3.86
PBS	Dennis Tweening Rantau	5,286	43.81	▼5.37
Independent	Liew Teck Khen @ Liaw Teck King	219	1.81	▲1.81
Total valid votes		12,067	100.00	
Total rejected ballots		152		
Unreturned ballots		12		
Turnout		12,231	65.79	▼1.87
Registered electors		18,590		
Majority		1,276	38.43	▲36.79
BN hold		Swing		

Malaysian general election, 1995
Party	Candidate	Votes	%
BN	Ahmad @ Asmat Nagka @ Nungka	5,868	50.82
PBS	Soh Chue @ Samson Soh Chue Tet	5,679	49.18
Total valid votes		11,547	100.00
Total rejected ballots		252	
Unreturned ballots		21	
Turnout		11,820	67.66
Registered electors		17,470	
Majority		189	1.64
This was a new constituency created.
