= Sugut (state constituency) =

State constituency in Sabah, Malaysia

Sugut (N48)
Sabah constituency

State constituency
- Legislature: Sabah State Legislative Assembly
MLA
James Ratib
GRS
- Constituency created: 1967
- First contested: 1967
- Last contested: 2025

Demographics
- Electors (2025): 18,435

Sugut is a state constituency in Sabah, Malaysia, that is represented in the Sabah State Legislative Assembly.

== Demographics ==
As of 2020, Sugut has a population of 38,436 people.

Ethnic breakdown of Sugut's electorate as of 2025
1. Muslim Bumiputera (55.0%)
2. Non-Muslim Bumiputera (44.0%)
3. Chinese (0.50%)
4. Other ethnicities (0.50%)

== History ==
=== Polling districts ===
According to the gazette issued on 31 October 2022, the Sugut constituency has a total of 21 polling districts.

State constituency	Polling Districts	Code	Location
Sugut (N48)	Jambongan Utara	183/48/01	SK Jambongan
Sugut (N48)	Golong	183/48/02	SK Golong
Sugut (N48)	Paitan Barat	183/48/03	SK Kabuluh
Sugut (N48)	Terusan Sugut	183/48/04	SK Terusan Sugut
Sugut (N48)	Alungai	183/48/05	Balai Raya Timpus
Sugut (N48)	Lingkabau Utara	183/48/06	Balai Raya Kampung Mangkasulap
Sugut (N48)	Lingkabau Selatan	183/48/07	SK Lingkabau; SK Monopod
Sugut (N48)	Sungai-Sungai	183/48/08	SK Sungai-Sungai
Sugut (N48)	Pamol	183/48/09	SMK Pamol
Sugut (N48)	Botitian	183/48/10	SK Botition
Sugut (N48)	Malalin	183/48/11	SK Malalin
Sugut (N48)	Bawang	183/48/12	SK Bawang; SK Tangkarason
Sugut (N48)	Tanjung Nipis	183/48/13	SK Tanjung Nipis
Sugut (N48)	Lubang Buaya	183/48/14	SK Lubang Buaya
Sugut (N48)	Obah	183/48/15	SK Obah
Sugut (N48)	Pantai Boring	183/48/16	Mini Dewan Kampung Pantai Boring
Sugut (N48)	Tampat	183/48/17	SK Tampat
Sugut (N48)	Dalamas	183/48/18	SK Simpangan
Sugut (N48)	Nakadong	183/48/19	Balai Raya Kampung Nakadong; Balai Raya Kampung Tagapalang
Sugut (N48)	Abuan	183/48/20	SK Abuan
Sugut (N48)	Binsulung	183/48/21	SK Binsung

=== Representation history ===
Member of Sabah State Legislative Assembly for Sugut
Assembly	No	Years	Member	Party
Constituency created
3rd	N25	1967 – 1970	Kongkawang Kulang	Alliance (USNO)
3rd	N25	1960 – 1971	Habib Abdul Rahman Habib Mahmud	Alliance (USNO)
4th	N25	1971 – 1976	Habib Abdul Rahman Habib Mahmud	Alliance (USNO)
5th	N10	1976 – 1980	Betua Abbah	Alliance (USNO)
5th	N10	1980 – 1981	Pengiran Khafid Pengiran Salleh	BN (BERJAYA)
6th	N10	1981 – 1985	Pengiran Khafid Pengiran Salleh	BN (BERJAYA)
7th	N15	1985 – 1986	Ampong Puyon	USNO
8th	N15	1986 – 1990	Jublee Zen	PBS
9th	N15	1990 – 1994	Jublee Zen	GR (PBS)
10th	N15	1994 – 1999	Surady Kayong	BN (UMNO)
11th	N32	1999 – 2004	Surady Kayong	BN (UMNO)
12th	N39	2004 – 2008	Surady Kayong	BN (UMNO)
13th	N39	2008 – 2013	Surady Kayong	BN (UMNO)
14th	N39	2013 – 2018	James Ratib	BN (UMNO)
15th	N39	2018	James Ratib	BN (UMNO)
15th	N39	2018 – 2020	James Ratib	UPKO
15th	N39	2020	James Ratib	Independent
16th	N48	2020 – 2023	James Ratib	BN (UMNO)
16th	N48	2023–2025	James Ratib	GRS (GAGASAN)
17th	N48	2025–present	James Ratib	GRS (GAGASAN)

== Election results ==
Sabah state election, 2025
Party	Candidate	Votes	%	∆%
GRS	James Ratib	6,281	50.00	▲50.00
PN	Ronald Kiandee	3,498	27.84	▲27.84
Heritage	Aspah Abdullah Sani	1,414	11.26	▼23.13
BN	Arifin Pachuk	922	7.34	▼48.70
Sabah Dream Party	Rosely Lajun	220	1.75	▲1.75
Independent	Roger Langgau	143	1.14	▲1.14
Sabah People's Unity Party	Hassan Mentiak	85	0.68	▲0.68
Total valid votes		12,563		
Total rejected ballots		273		
Unreturned ballots		10		
Turnout		12,846	69.68	▲6.13
Registered electors		18,435		
Majority		2,783	22.16	▲0.51
GRS gain from BN		Swing		-
Source(s) "RESULTS OF CONTESTED ELECTION AND STATEMENTS OF THE POLL AFTER THE OFFICIAL ADDITION OF VOTES" (PDF).

Sabah state election, 2020
Party	Candidate	Votes	%	∆%
BN	James Ratib	4,308	56.04	▲3.08
Sabah Heritage Party	Norsabrina Japar	2,644	34.39	▼1.45
LDP	Razak Allexsius Kontuni	178	2.32	▲2.32
Love Sabah Party	Raimon Lanjat	124	1.61	▲1.61
Sabah People's Unity Party	Kamaruddin Jamil	86	1.12	▼3.79
Independent	Undang Jalang	65	0.85	▲0.85
USNO (Baru)	Jubin Tulawi	38	0.49	▲0.49
Total valid votes		7,443	96.81	
Total rejected ballots		228	2.97	
Unreturned ballots		17	0.22	
Turnout		7,688	63.55	▼12.35
Registered electors		11,712		
Majority		1,664	21.65	▲4.53
BN hold		Swing		
Source(s) "RESULTS OF CONTESTED ELECTION AND STATEMENTS OF THE POLL AFTER THE OFFICIAL ADDITION OF VOTES".

Sabah state election, 2018
Party	Candidate	Votes	%	∆%
BN	James Ratib	4,704	52.96	▼6.74
Sabah Heritage Party	Aspah Abdullah Sani	3,183	35.84	▲35.84
Sabah People's Unity Party	Arshad Abdul Mualaf	436	4.91	▲4.91
Sabah Nationality Party	Osman Asibih	111	1.25	▲1.25
Total valid votes		8,434	94.96	
Total rejected ballots		428	4.82	
Unreturned ballots		20	0.23	
Turnout		8,882	75.90	▼11.10
Registered electors		11,703		
Majority		1,521	17.12	▼22.17
BN hold		Swing		
Source(s) "RESULTS OF CONTESTED ELECTION AND STATEMENTS OF THE POLL AFTER THE OFFICIAL ADDITION OF VOTES".

Sabah state election, 2013
Party	Candidate	Votes	%	∆%
BN	James Ratib	4,285	59.70	▼9.65
Independent	Abdul Rahman Atang	1,465	20.41	▲20.41
PKR	Pagrios @ Petrus Zabang	647	9.01	▼4.05
STAR	Masiawan Kunching	341	4.75	▲4.75
Independent	Kamaruddin Mustapha	111	1.55	▲1.55
Total valid votes		6,849	95.42	
Total rejected ballots		326	4.54	
Unreturned ballots		3	0.04	
Turnout		7,178	87.00	▲29.15
Registered electors		9,675		
Majority		2,820	39.29	▼17.00
BN hold		Swing		
Source(s) "KEPUTUSAN PILIHAN RAYA UMUM DEWAN UNDANGAN NEGERI".

Sabah state election, 2008
Party	Candidate	Votes	%	∆%
BN	Surady Kayong	3,123	69.35	
PKR	Raidin Rumantai	588	13.06	
Independent	Basran Omar	363	8.06	
Independent	Janid Bobonong	111	2.47	
Independent	Nordin Kaning @ Khani	73	1.62	
Total valid votes		4,258	94.56	
Total rejected ballots		237	3.04	
Unreturned ballots		8	0.18	
Turnout		4,503	57.85	
Registered electors		7,784		
Majority		2,535	56.29	
BN hold		Swing		
Source(s) "KEPUTUSAN PILIHAN RAYA UMUM DEWAN UNDANGAN NEGERI SABAH BAGI TAHUN 2008".

Sabah state election, 2004
Party	Candidate	Votes	%	∆%
On the nomination day, Surady Kayong won uncontested.
BN	Surady Kayong			
Total valid votes				
Total rejected ballots				
Unreturned ballots				
Turnout				
Registered electors		7,562		
Majority				
BN hold		Swing		
Source(s) "KEPUTUSAN PILIHAN RAYA UMUM DEWAN UNDANGAN NEGERI SABAH BAGI TAHUN 2004".

Sabah state election, 1999
Party	Candidate	Votes	%	∆%
BN	Surady Kayong	2,405	48.14	▼1.53
PBS	Jublee Zen	2,151	43.05	▼4.99
BERSEKUTU	Jamarudin Madirin	216	4.32	▲4.32
Independent	Tumingi @ Abdul Mutalib Daud	75	1.50	▲1.50
Independent	Amran Masrah	48	0.96	▲0.96
Total valid votes		4,895	97.98	
Total rejected ballots		101	2.02	
Unreturned ballots		0	0.00	
Turnout		4,996	69.56	▲4.06
Registered electors		7,182		
Majority		254	5.09	▲3.46
BN hold		Swing		
Source(s) "KEPUTUSAN PILIHAN RAYA UMUM DEWAN UNDANGAN NEGERI SABAH BAGI TAHUN 1999".

Sabah state election, 1994
Party	Candidate	Votes	%	∆%
BN	Surady Kayong	2,403	49.67	▲14.13
PBS	Jublee Zen	2,324	48.04	▼1.02
Total valid votes		4,727	97.71	
Total rejected ballots		111	2.29	
Unreturned ballots		0	0.00	
Turnout		4,838	65.50	▼4.12
Registered electors		7,386		
Majority		79	1.63	▼11.89
BN gain from PBS		Swing		?
Source(s) "KEPUTUSAN PILIHAN RAYA UMUM DEWAN UNDANGAN NEGERI SABAH BAGI TAHUN 1994".

Sabah state election, 1990
Party	Candidate	Votes	%	∆%
PBS	Jublee Zen	1,666	49.06	▼5.72
USNO	Musa Aman	1,207	35.54	▼1.51
AKAR	Ronald Kiandee	231	6.80	▲6.80
BERJAYA	Abdul Rahman Atang	114	3.36	▲3.36
PRS	Julius Niyo	71	2.09	▲2.09
Total valid votes		3,289	96.85	
Total rejected ballots		107	3.15	
Unreturned ballots		0	0.00	
Turnout		3,396	69.62	▲11.95
Registered electors		4,878		
Majority		459	13.52	▼4.21
PBS hold		Swing		
Source(s) "KEPUTUSAN PILIHAN RAYA UMUM DEWAN UNDANGAN NEGERI SABAH BAGI TAHUN 1990".

Sabah state election, 1986
Party	Candidate	Votes	%	∆%
PBS	Jublee K K Zen	1,563	56.10	▼3.80
Independent	Ampong Puyon	1,057	37.94	▲5.92
Independent	Adnan Md Jaafar	166	5.96	▲5.96
Total valid votes		2,786	100.00	
Total rejected ballots		506		
Unreturned ballots		0		
Turnout		3,292	57.67	▲2.27
Registered electors		5,707		
Majority		506	18.16	▼24.04
PBS gain from Independent		Swing		?
Source(s) "KEPUTUSAN PILIHAN RAYA UMUM DEWAN UNDANGAN NEGERI SABAH BAGI TAHUN 1986".

Sabah state election, 1985
Party	Candidate	Votes	%	∆%
Independent	Ampong Puyon	803	32.26	▲32.26
Independent	Jublee K K Zen	722	29.01	▲29.01
BERJAYA	Abdul Khafid Salleh	626	25.15	▲25.15
Independent	Zikiri Ajad	260	10.45	▲10.45
Independent	Pudah Angguy	78	3.13	▲3.13
Total valid votes		2,489	100.00	
Total rejected ballots		81		
Unreturned ballots		0		
Turnout		2,570	55.40	
Registered electors		4,641		
Majority		81	3.25	
Independent hold		Swing		

Sabah state election, 1982
Party	Candidate	Votes	%	∆%
Independent	Hassan Alban Sandukong	6,120	60.74	▲7.84
USNO	Ampong Puyon	3,955	39.26	▼12.88
Total valid votes		10,075	100.00	
Total rejected ballots		2,165		
Unreturned ballots		0		
Turnout		12,240	59.70	▲0.34
Registered electors		20,501		
Majority		2,165	21.48	▲15.00
Independent gain from BERJAYA		Swing		.

Sabah state election, 1981
Party	Candidate	Votes	%	∆%
BERJAYA	Pengiran Abdul Khafid Salleh	1,441	52.90	▲21.29
Independent	Julius Niyo	736	27.02	▲27.02
Independent	Mohd Said Imam Puyoh	529	19.42	▲19.42
Independent	Abdul Nasri Kiwang	18	0.66	▲0.66
Total valid votes		2,724	100.00	
Total rejected ballots		705		
Unreturned ballots		0		
Turnout		3,429	59.36	▼11.78
Registered electors		5,776		
Majority		705	25.88	▼24.17
BERJAYA hold		Swing		

Sabah state by-election, 24 May 1980 Upon of the resignation of Apong Puyon.
Party	Candidate	Votes	%	∆%
BERJAYA	Pengiran Abdul Khafid Salleh	1,481	78.32	▲78.32
Independent	Buangkan Dawat	410	21.68	▲21.68
Total valid votes		1,891	100.00	
Total rejected ballots		1,071		
Unreturned ballots		0		
Turnout		2,962	42.70	▼17.82
Registered electors		6,924		
Majority		1,071	56.64	▲52.36
BERJAYA gain from BERJAYA		Swing		.

Sabah state election, 1978
Party	Candidate	Votes	%	∆%
USNO	Ampong Puyon	4,224	52.14	▲15.57
Independent	Anthony Nicol Sidol	3,877	47.86	▲47.86
Total valid votes		8,101	100.00	
Total rejected ballots		347		
Unreturned ballots		0		
Turnout		8,448	60.52	▲11.02
Registered electors		13,957		
Majority		347	4.28	▼33.50
BERJAYA hold		Swing		

Sabah state election, 1976
Party	Candidate	Votes	%	∆%
USNO	Batua Abbah	1,837	68.39	▲47.61
BERJAYA	Pengiran Abdul Khafid Salleh	849	31.61	▲31.61
Total valid votes		2,686	100.00	
Total rejected ballots		988		
Unreturned ballots		0		
Turnout		3,674	71.14	▼1.04
Registered electors		5,160		
Majority		988	36.78	▲36.78
USNO hold		Swing		

Sabah state election, 1971
Party	Candidate	Votes	%	∆%
On the nomination day, Habib Abdul Rahman Habib Mahmud won uncontested.
USNO	Habib Abdul Rahman Habib Mahmud			
Total valid votes				
Total rejected ballots				
Unreturned ballots				
Turnout				
Registered electors				
Majority				
USNO hold		Swing		

Sabah state by-election, 24 May 1970 Upon of the resignation of Kangkawang Kulang.
Party	Candidate	Votes	%	∆%
On the nomination day, Habib Abdul Rahman Habib Mahmud won uncontested.
USNO	Ajad Oyung			
Total valid votes				
Total rejected ballots				
Unreturned ballots				
Turnout				
Registered electors		11,742		
Majority				
USNO hold		Swing		

Sabah state election, 1967
Party	Candidate	Votes	%
USNO	Kangkawang Kulang	3,271	78.52
UPKO	Nasrun Lunsui	844	20.26
Independent	Thomas Lo Pin Fah	51	1.22
Total valid votes		4,166	100.00
Total rejected ballots		2,427	
Unreturned ballots		0	
Turnout		6,593	80.90
Registered electors		8,145	
Majority		2,427	58.25
This was a new seat created.
