= Ronald Kiandee =

Malaysian politician (born 1961)

Yang Berhormat Datuk Seri Dr. Ronald Kiandee SMW PGDK MP
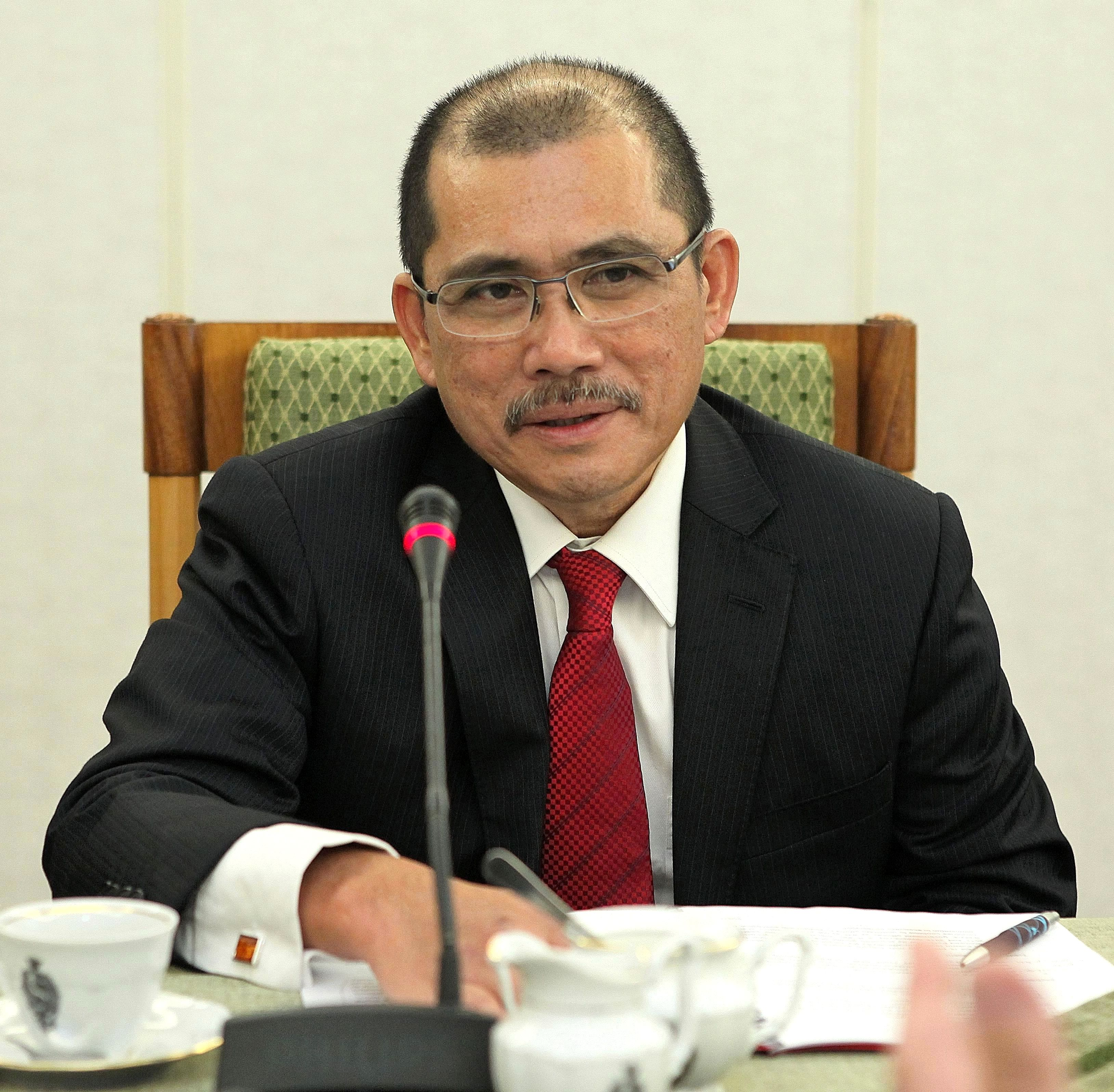
- Ronald Kiandee in the Polish Senate (2013)

Minister of Agriculture and Food Industries
- In office 30 August 2021 – 24 November 2022
- Monarch: Abdullah
- Prime Minister: Ismail Sabri Yaakob
- Deputy: Ahmad Hamzah; Nik Muhammad Zawawi Salleh
- Preceded by: Himself
- Succeeded by: Mohamad Sabu (Minister of Agriculture and Food Security)
- Constituency: Beluran
- In office 10 March 2020 – 16 August 2021
- Monarch: Abdullah
- Prime Minister: Muhyiddin Yassin
- Deputy: Ahmad Hamzah; Che Abdullah Mat Nawi
- Preceded by: Salahuddin Ayub as Minister of Agriculture and Agro-based Industry
- Succeeded by: Himself
- Constituency: Beluran

Deputy Speaker of the Dewan Rakyat I
- In office 28 April 2008 – 10 May 2018 Serving with Wan Junaidi Tuanku Jaafar (2008–2013); Ismail Mohamed Said (2013–2018)
- Monarchs: Mizan Zainal Abidin; Abdul Halim; Muhammad V
- Prime Minister: Abdullah Ahmad Badawi; Najib Razak
- Speaker: Pandikar Amin Mulia
- Preceded by: Yusof Yacob
- Succeeded by: Mohd Rashid Hasnon
- Constituency: Beluran

Chairman of the Public Accounts Committee
- In office 7 August 2018 – 11 April 2019
- Nominated by: Mahathir Mohamad
- Appointed by: Mohamad Ariff Md Yusof
- Deputy: Wong Kah Woh
- Preceded by: Hasan Arifin
- Succeeded by: Noraini Ahmad
- Constituency: Beluran

Vice President of the Malaysian United Indigenous Party
- In office 23 August 2020 – 10 March 2026 Serving with Radzi Jidin & Mohd Rafiq Naizamohideen (2020–2022) & Ahmad Faizal Azumu
- President: Muhyiddin Yassin

2nd State Chairman of the Malaysian United Indigenous Party of Sabah
- In office 11 December 2022 – 10 March 2026
- President: Muhyiddin Yassin
- Deputy: Aksyah Nasrah (2022–2024); Muhammad Affan Jumahat (since 2025)
- Preceded by: Hajiji Noor

Member of the Malaysian Parliament for Beluran
- Incumbent
- Assumed office 29 November 1999
- Preceded by: Asmat Nungka (BN–UMNO)
- Majority: 1,276 (1999); Walkover (2004); 4,352 (2008); 9,988 (2013); 7,115 (2018); 1,594 (2022)

Faction represented in Dewan Rakyat
- 1999–2018: Barisan Nasional
- 2018–2019: Independent
- 2019–2020: Pakatan Harapan
- 2020: Malaysian United Indigenous Party
- 2020–: Perikatan Nasional

Personal details
- Born: Ronald Kiandee; 10 January 1961 (age 65) Beluran, Sandakan, Crown Colony of North Borneo (now Sabah, Malaysia)
- Citizenship: Malaysian
- Party: People's Justice Front (AKAR) (1989–2001); United Malays National Organisation of Sabah (Sabah UMNO) (2001–2018); Malaysian United Indigenous Party of Sabah (Sabah BERSATU) (since 2019; suspended since 2026)
- Other political affiliations: United People's Justice Front (AKAR BERSATU) (1989–2001); Barisan Nasional (BN) (2001–2018); Pakatan Harapan (PH) (2019–2020); Perikatan Nasional (PN) (since 2020; suspended since 2026)
- Education: Universiti Putra Malaysia (BSc); Universiti Tun Abdul Razak (MBA); Universiti Sains Malaysia (PhD)
- Occupation: Politician

Ronald Kiandee (born 10 January 1961) is a Malaysian politician. He has served as the Member of Parliament (MP) for Beluran since November 1999. He was a vice president of the Malaysian United Indigenous Party (BERSATU) from 2022, as well as chairman of its Sabah branch from 2020 to 2026, when his membership in the party was suspended.

Kiandee served as Minister of Agriculture and Food Industries in the successive governments of Muhyiddin Yassin and Ismail Sabri from 2020 to 2022. Prior to becoming a minister, he was chairman of the Public Accounts Committee (PAC) from 2018 to 2019, and was the Deputy Speaker of the Dewan Rakyat I from 2008 to 2018.

He is one of two MPs, alongside Ali Biju, from the Perikatan Nasional coalition who are non-Muslim East Malaysians.

== Early life ==
He holds a Doctor of Philosophy (PhD) in political sociology from Universiti Sains Malaysia.

== Political career ==
Kiandee was first elected to the Dewan Rakyat as a member of the United Malays National Organisation (UMNO) in the 1999 election. He was Deputy Speaker of the Dewan Rakyat from April 2008 until May 2018, when Barisan Nasional lost in the 2018 general election. Kiandee then served as chairman of the Public Accounts Committee (PAC) from 2018 to 2019.

Kiandee left UMNO to sit as an independent on 12 December 2018, and later joined BERSATU on 15 March 2019. Following the defection of the bulk of BERSATU's Sabah branch, then led by Hajiji Noor, Kiandee became the branch's sole MP.

Following an intra-party dispute, Kiandee's membership in BERSATU was suspended for two terms and stripped of all party positions. He had supported efforts by the party's then-deputy president Hamzah Zainudin to replace president Muhyiddin Yassin, and was later present at Hamzah's announcement of founding a new party.

== Election results ==
Sabah State Legislative Assembly
Year	Constituency	Candidate	Votes	Pct	Opponent(s)	Votes	Pct	Ballots cast	Majority	Turnout
1990	N15 Sugut	Ronald Kiandee (AKAR)	231	6.80%	Jublee Zen (PBS)	1,666	49.06%	3,289	459	69.62%
1990	N15 Sugut	Ronald Kiandee (AKAR)	231	6.80%	Musa Aman (USNO)	1,207	35.54%	3,289	459	69.62%
1990	N15 Sugut	Ronald Kiandee (AKAR)	231	6.80%	Abdul Rahman Atang (BERJAYA)	114	3.36%	3,289	459	69.62%
1990	N15 Sugut	Ronald Kiandee (AKAR)	231	6.80%	Julius Niyo (PRS)	71	2.09%	3,289	459	69.62%
2025	N48 Sugut	Ronald Kiandee (BERSATU)	3,498	27.84%	James Ratib (GAGASAN)	6,281	50.00%	12,846	2,783	69.68%
2025	N48 Sugut	Ronald Kiandee (BERSATU)	3,498	27.84%	Aspah Abdullah Sani (WARISAN)	1,414	11.26%	12,846	2,783	69.68%
2025	N48 Sugut	Ronald Kiandee (BERSATU)	3,498	27.84%	Arifin Pachuk (UMNO)	922	7.34%	12,846	2,783	69.68%
2025	N48 Sugut	Ronald Kiandee (BERSATU)	3,498	27.84%	Rosely Lajun (IMPIAN)	220	1.75%	12,846	2,783	69.68%
2025	N48 Sugut	Ronald Kiandee (BERSATU)	3,498	27.84%	Roger Langgau (IND)	143	1.14%	12,846	2,783	69.68%
2025	N48 Sugut	Ronald Kiandee (BERSATU)	3,498	27.84%	Hassan Mentiak (PPRS)	85	0.68%	12,846	2,783	69.68%

Parliament of Malaysia
Year	Constituency	Candidate	Votes	Pct	Opponent(s)	Votes	Pct	Ballots cast	Majority	Turnout
1999	P159 Beluran	Ronald Kiandee (UMNO)	6,562	54.38%	Dennis Rantau (PBS)	5,286	43.81%	12,231	1,276	65.79%
1999	P159 Beluran	Ronald Kiandee (UMNO)	6,562	54.38%	Liew Teck Khen (IND)	219	1.81%	12,231	1,276	65.79%
2004	P183 Beluran	Ronald Kiandee (UMNO)	Unopposed							
2008	P183 Beluran	Ronald Kiandee (UMNO)	7,090	59.86%	Ramsah Tasim (IND)	2,738	23.12%	12,349	4,352	64.38%
2008	P183 Beluran	Ronald Kiandee (UMNO)	7,090	59.86%	Michael Luban (PKR)	1,271	10.73%	12,349	4,352	64.38%
2008	P183 Beluran	Ronald Kiandee (UMNO)	7,090	59.86%	Petrus Rining (IND)	571	4.82%	12,349	4,352	64.38%
2008	P183 Beluran	Ronald Kiandee (UMNO)	7,090	59.86%	Nordin Kaning (IND)	175	1.48%	12,349	4,352	64.38%
2013	P183 Beluran	Ronald Kiandee (UMNO)	13,174	71.75%	James Miki (PKR)	3,186	17.35%	18,915	9,988	76.62%
2013	P183 Beluran	Ronald Kiandee (UMNO)	13,174	71.75%	Raimon Lanjat (STAR)	1,460	7.95%	18,915	9,988	76.62%
2013	P183 Beluran	Ronald Kiandee (UMNO)	13,174	71.75%	Kamaruddin Mustapha (IND)	542	2.95%	18,915	9,988	76.62%
2018	P183 Beluran	Ronald Kiandee (UMNO)	13,007	62.84%	Japar Zairun (WARISAN)	5,892	28.47%	21,606	7,115	75.79%
2018	P183 Beluran	Ronald Kiandee (UMNO)	13,007	62.84%	Sipin Kadandi (PHRS)	996	4.81%	21,606	7,115	75.79%
2018	P183 Beluran	Ronald Kiandee (UMNO)	13,007	62.84%	Toidy Luit (PCS)	284	1.37%	21,606	7,115	75.79%
2018	P183 Beluran	Ronald Kiandee (UMNO)	13,007	62.84%	Lem Matin (PPRS)	273	1.32%	21,606	7,115	75.79%
2018	P183 Beluran	Ronald Kiandee (UMNO)	13,007	62.84%	Salimah Oyong (IND)	246	1.19%	21,606	7,115	75.79%
2022	P183 Beluran	Ronald Kiandee (BERSATU)	11,303	38.53%	Benedict Asmat (UMNO)	9,709	33.10%	29,951	1,594	65.58%
2022	P183 Beluran	Ronald Kiandee (BERSATU)	11,303	38.53%	Felix Joseph Saang (UPKO)	4,460	15.20%	29,951	1,594	65.58%
2022	P183 Beluran	Ronald Kiandee (BERSATU)	11,303	38.53%	Rowiena Rasid (WARISAN)	3,707	12.64%	29,951	1,594	65.58%
2022	P183 Beluran	Ronald Kiandee (BERSATU)	11,303	38.53%	Hausing Sudin (PEJUANG)	155	0.53%	29,951	1,594	65.58%

== Honours ==
=== Honours of Malaysia ===
- Malaysia
  - Recipient of the 17th Yang di-Pertuan Agong Installation Medal
- Sabah
  - Commander of the Order of Kinabalu (PGDK) – Datuk (2004)
- Federal Territory (Malaysia)
  - Grand Commander of the Order of the Territorial Crown (SMW) – Datuk Seri (2014)
