= Karanaan =

Malaysian political subdivision

Karanaan (N37)
Sabah constituency

State constituency
- Legislature: Sabah State Legislative Assembly
MLA
Masidi Manjun
GRS
- Constituency created: 2003
- First contested: 2004
- Last contested: 2025

Demographics
- Population (2020): 21,115
- Electors (2025): 18,696

Karanaan is a state constituency in Sabah, Malaysia, that is represented in the Sabah State Legislative Assembly.

== Demographics ==
As of 2020, Karanaan has a population of 21,115 people.

Ethnic breakdown of Karanaan's electorate as of 2025
1. Muslim Bumiputera (53.0%)
2. Non-Muslim Bumiputera (42.8%)
3. Chinese (4.20%)
4. Other ethnicities (0.00%)

== History ==
=== Polling districts ===
According to the gazette issued on 31 October 2022, the Karanaan constituency has a total of 17 polling districts.

State constituency	Polling Districts	Code	Location
Karanaan（N37）	Paka	179/37/01	SK Pekan Ranau
Karanaan（N37）	Pekan Ranau	179/37/02	SMK Mat Salleh Ranau
Karanaan（N37）	Tambiau	179/37/03	Balai Raya Kampung Tambiau
Karanaan（N37）	Tagudon	179/37/04	SK Tagudon Lama
Karanaan（N37）	Karanaan	179/37/05	SK Karanaan
Karanaan（N37）	Tungou	179/37/06	SK Tungou
Karanaan（N37）	Randagong	179/37/07	SK Randagong
Karanaan（N37）	Lipasu	179/37/08	SK Kimondou
Karanaan（N37）	Mohimboyon	179/37/09	SK Mohimboyon
Karanaan（N37）	Toboh	179/37/10	SK Toboh
Karanaan（N37）	Ratau	179/37/11	SK Ratau
Karanaan（N37）	Kamburongoh	179/37/12	SK Kamburongoh
Karanaan（N37）	Sumaang	179/37/13	SJK (C) Pai Wen
Karanaan（N37）	Kimolohing	179/37/14	SK St Benedict
Karanaan（N37）	Kinarasan	179/37/15	SK Kinirasan
Karanaan（N37）	Waang	179/37/16	SK Waang
Karanaan（N37）	Tudan	179/37/17	SK Tudan

=== Representation history ===
Member of Sabah State Legislative Assembly for Karanaan
Assembly	No	Years	Member	Party
Constituency created from Ranau, Kiulu and Kundasang
12th	N30	2004 – 2008	Masidi Manjun	BN (UMNO)
13th	N30	2008 – 2013	Masidi Manjun	BN (UMNO)
14th	N30	2013 – 2018	Masidi Manjun	BN (UMNO)
15th	N30	2018	Masidi Manjun	BN (UMNO)
15th	N30	2018 - 2019	Masidi Manjun	Independent
15th	N30	2019 – 2020	Masidi Manjun	PH (BERSATU)
15th	N30	2020	Masidi Manjun	PN (BERSATU)
16th	N37	2020 – 2022	Masidi Manjun	GRS (BERSATU)
16th	N37	2022 - 2023	Masidi Manjun	GRS (Direct)
16th	N37	2023–2025	Masidi Manjun	GRS (GAGASAN)
17th	N37	2025–present	Masidi Manjun	GRS (GAGASAN)

== Election results ==
Sabah state election, 2025: Karanaan
Party	Candidate	Votes	%	∆%
GRS	Masidi Manjun	7,081	54.63	▲54.63
Homeland Solidarity Party	Anuar Ghani	1,720	13.27	▲13.27
BN	Nadzmin Kamin	1,630	12.58	▲12.58
KDM	Karim Adam	895	6.91	▲6.91
Heritage	Mukinin Malapan	860	6.64	▼13.77
UPKO	Georgeina L George	660	5.09	▲5.09
Independent	Naomi @ Neomi Francis	115	0.89	▲0.89
Total valid votes		12,961		
Total rejected ballots		114		
Unreturned ballots		10		
Turnout		13,085	69.99	▲2.31
Registered electors		18,696		
Majority		5,361	41.36	▼10.85
GRS gain from PN		Swing		?
Source(s) "RESULTS OF CONTESTED ELECTION AND STATEMENTS OF THE POLL AFTER THE OFFICIAL ADDITION OF VOTES" (PDF).

Sabah state election, 2020: Karanaan
Party	Candidate	Votes	%	∆%
PN	Masidi Manjun	6,696	72.62	▲72.62
Sabah Heritage Party	Awasi Ganie Abdul Ghani	1,882	20.41	▲20.41
Love Sabah Party	Hadzrul Masnin	434	4.71	▲4.71
USNO (Baru)	Mohd Tajuddin Sadi	74	0.80	▲0.80
Total valid votes		9,086	98.54	
Total rejected ballots		100	1.08	
Unreturned ballots		35	0.38	
Turnout		9,221	67.68	▼13.17
Registered electors		13,425		
Majority		4,814	52.21	▲17.42
PN gain from BN		Swing		?
Source(s) "RESULTS OF CONTESTED ELECTION AND STATEMENTS OF THE POLL AFTER THE OFFICIAL ADDITION OF VOTES". Archived from the original on 2022-09-28.

Sabah state election, 2018: Karanaan
Party	Candidate	Votes	%	∆%
BN	Masidi Manjun	6,849	62.67	▲1.90
PKR	Pehing @ Chong Peck Hing	3,047	27.88	▲0.91
Sabah People's Hope Party	Aman @ Adzman Manaf	685	6.27	▲6.27
Sabah Native Co-operation Party	Juhaili Sidek	104	0.95	▲0.95
Total valid votes		10,705	97.96	
Total rejected ballots		155	1.42	
Unreturned ballots		68	0.62	
Turnout		10,928	80.85	▼2.27
Registered electors		13,517		
Majority		3,782	34.79	▲0.99
BN hold		Swing		
Source(s) "RESULTS OF CONTESTED ELECTION AND STATEMENTS OF THE POLL AFTER THE OFFICIAL ADDITION OF VOTES". Archived from the original on 2022-09-28.

Sabah state election, 2013: Karanaan
Party	Candidate	Votes	%	∆%
BN	Masidi Manjun	6,292	60.77	▼20.22
PKR	Muhiddin @ Mohd Anas Yusin	2,792	26.97	▲9.68
STAR	Jalibin Paidi	1,067	10.31	▲10.31
Independent	Mohd Jaili Samat	31	0.30	▲0.30
Total valid votes		10,182	98.35	
Total rejected ballots		149	1.44	
Unreturned ballots		22	0.21	
Turnout		10,353	83.12	▲10.67
Registered electors		12,456		
Majority		3,500	33.80	▼29.90
BN hold		Swing		
Source(s) "KEPUTUSAN PILIHAN RAYA UMUM DEWAN UNDANGAN NEGERI". Archived from the original on 2022-07-18.

Sabah state election, 2008: Karanaan
Party	Candidate	Votes	%	∆%
BN	Masidi Manjun	6,505	80.99	▼7.74
PKR	Atin @ Attin Naisin	1,389	17.29	▲17.29
Total valid votes		7,894	98.27	
Total rejected ballots		116	1.44	
Unreturned ballots		23	0.29	
Turnout		8,033	72.45	▲3.55
Registered electors		11,087		
Majority		5,116	63.70	▼19.41
BN hold		Swing		
Source(s) "KEPUTUSAN PILIHAN RAYA UMUM DEWAN UNDANGAN NEGERI SABAH BAGI TAHUN 2008".

Sabah state election, 2004: Karanaan
Party	Candidate	Votes	%
BN	Masidi Manjun	6,519	88.73
Independent	Mohd Mian Mohd Ali	413	5.62
SETIA	Sutian @ Phoulus Kendilong	254	3.46
Total valid votes		7,186	97.81
Total rejected ballots		146	1.99
Unreturned ballots		15	0.20
Turnout		7,347	68.90
Registered electors		10,664	
Majority		6,106	83.11
This was a new constituency created.
Source(s) "KEPUTUSAN PILIHAN RAYA UMUM DEWAN UNDANGAN NEGERI SABAH BAGI TAHUN 2004".
