= Masidi Manjun =

Malaysian politician, lawyer and public administrator

Yang Berhormat Datuk Seri Panglima Haji Masidi Manjun SPDK PGDK KMN AMN JP MLA
- مسيدي منجون
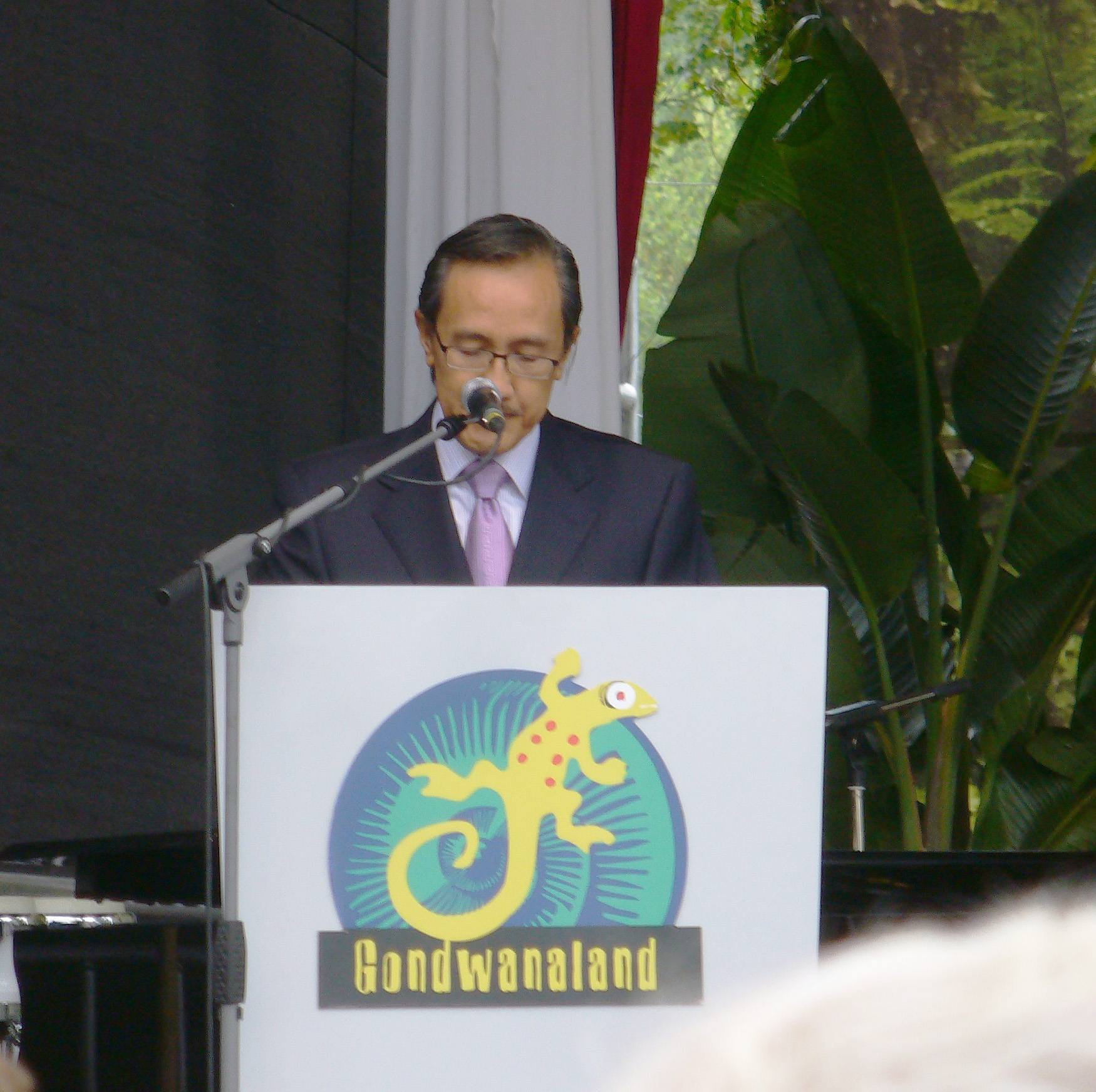

Deputy Chief Minister II of Sabah
- Incumbent
- Assumed office 1 December 2025 Serving with: Joachim Gunsalam (Deputy Chief Minister I) &; Ewon Benedick (Deputy Chief Minister III)
- Governor: Musa Aman
- Chief Minister: Hajiji Noor
- Preceded by: Joachim Gunsalam
- Constituency: Karanaan

State Minister of Finance of Sabah
- Incumbent
- Assumed office 11 January 2023 (lapse on 30 November 2025)
- Governor: Juhar Mahiruddin (2020–2024); Musa Aman (since 2025)
- Chief Minister: Hajiji Noor
- Assistants: Jasnih Daya (2023); Julita Mojungki (2023–2025); Tan Lee Fatt (2023–2025); Mohd Ishak Ayub (since 2025); Ben Chong Chen Bin (since 2025)
- Preceded by: Hajiji Noor
- Constituency: Karanaan

State Minister of Housing and Local Government of Sabah
- In office 29 September 2020 – 11 January 2023
- Governor: Juhar Mahiruddin
- Chief Minister: Hajiji Noor
- Assistants: Isnin Aliasnih & Mohamad Hamsan Awang Supain
- Preceded by: Jaujan Sambakong
- Succeeded by: Joachim Gunsalam
- Constituency: Karanaan

State Minister of Finance of Sabah II
- In office 29 September 2020 – 11 January 2023 Serving with Hajiji Noor (State Minister of Finance of Sabah)
- Governor: Juhar Mahiruddin
- Chief Minister: Hajiji Noor
- Assistants: Nizam Abu Bakar Titingan & Jasnih Daya
- Preceded by: Position established
- Succeeded by: Position abolished
- Constituency: Karanaan

Deputy Chief Minister of Sabah III
- In office 11 May 2018 – 12 May 2018 Serving with: Hajiji Noor (Deputy Chief Minister I) &; Jeffrey Kitingan (Deputy Chief Minister II)
- Governor: Juhar Mahiruddin
- Chief Minister: Musa Aman
- Preceded by: Raymond Tan Shu Kiah
- Succeeded by: Christina Liew Chin Jin
- Constituency: Karanaan

State Minister of Tourism, Culture and Environment of Sabah
- In office 4 May 2007 – 12 May 2018
- Governor: Ahmadshah Abdullah (2007–2011); Juhar Mahiruddin (2011–2018)
- Chief Minister: Musa Aman
- Assistant: Karim Bujang (2007–2008); Bolkiah Ismail (2008–2013); Ellron Alfred Angin (2008–2013); Pang Yuk Ming (2013–2018); Kamarlin Ombi (2013–2018)
- Preceded by: Chong Kah Kiat
- Succeeded by: Christina Liew Chin Jin
- Constituency: Karanaan

State Minister of Youth and Sports of Sabah
- In office 27 March 2004 – 15 March 2008
- Governor: Ahmadshah Abdullah
- Chief Minister: Musa Aman
- Assistant: Jahid Jahim
- Preceded by: Joseph Kurup
- Succeeded by: Peter Pang En Yin
- Constituency: Karanaan

Chairman of the Board of Directors of the Universiti Malaysia Sabah
- In office 3 August 2020 – 1 January 2021
- Chancellor: Juhar Mahiruddin
- Minister: Noraini Ahmad
- Preceded by: Md Sidek Ahmad
- Succeeded by: Abdul Rahman Dahlan

Member of the Sabah State Legislative Assembly for Karanaan
- Incumbent
- Assumed office 21 March 2004
- Preceded by: Position established
- Majority: 6,106 (2004); 5,116 (2008); 3,500 (2013); 3,782 (2018); 4,814 (2020); 5,361 (2025)

Deputy President of Parti Gagasan Rakyat Sabah
- Incumbent
- Assumed office 5 February 2023
- President: Hajiji Noor
- Preceded by: Hiew King Cheu

1st State Deputy Chairman of the Malaysian United Indigenous Party of Sabah
- In office 6 April 2019 – 10 December 2022
- National President: Muhyiddin Yassin
- State Chairman: Hajiji Noor
- Preceded by: Position established
- Succeeded by: Aksyah Nasrah

Personal details
- Born: Masidi bin Manjun @ Masdi; 2 June 1950 (age 76) Ranau, North Borneo (now Sabah, Malaysia)
- Party: United Malays National Organisation of Sabah (Sabah UMNO) (until 2018); Malaysian United Indigenous Party of Sabah (Sabah BERSATU) (2019–2022); Parti Gagasan Rakyat Sabah (GAGASAN) (since 2023)
- Other political affiliations: Barisan Nasional (BN) (until 2018); Pakatan Harapan (PH) (2019–2020); Perikatan Nasional (PN) (2020–2022); Gabungan Rakyat Sabah (GRS) (since 2020)
- Spouse: Nurfarizah Abdullah @ Molly Lantai
- Education: University of London (LLB)
- Occupation: Politician
- Profession: Lawyer; public administrator

Masidi Manjun

Faction represented in the Sabah State Legislative Assembly
- 2004–2018: Barisan Nasional
- 2018–2019: Independent
- 2019–2020: Pakatan Harapan
- 2020–2022: Perikatan Nasional
- 2020–: Gabungan Rakyat Sabah

Masidi bin Manjun (born 2 June 1950) is a Malaysian politician, lawyer and public administrator who has served as Deputy Chief Minister II of Sabah since December 2025, State Minister of Finance of Sabah since January 2023 and State Minister of Local Government and Housing of Sabah from September 2020 until January 2023 in the Gabungan Rakyat Sabah (GRS) state administration under Chief Minister Hajiji Noor, as well as Member of the Sabah State Legislative Assembly (MLA) for Karanaan since March 2004. He was the state COVID-19 spokesman and coordinating minister of the GRS state government of Sabah. During the COVID-19 pandemic, he spoke frequently on the response of Sabah towards the pandemic. He is a member of Parti Gagasan Rakyat Sabah (GAGASAN), a component party of the GRS coalition. He has served as the Deputy President of GAGASAN since February 2023. He previously served as the State Deputy Chairman of the Malaysian United Indigenous Party of Sabah from April 2019 to his resignation from the party in December 2022 and Chairman of the Board of Directors of the Universiti Malaysia Sabah (UMS) from August 2020 to January 2021.

== Educational background ==
Masidi obtained a degree of Bachelor of Laws from the University of London in 1977 and became Barrister-at-Law with Honours at Lincoln's Inn, London in 1979.

== Career ==
=== Legal practice and public service ===
Masidi entered the State Public Service in 1977 as a legal adviser and prosecutor at the Forestry Department. He was admitted as an Advocate and Solicitor of the High Court of Sabah and Sarawak in 1980, the same year he was appointed as Tuaran District Officer. He was transferred to Sandakan as the town's municipal council president in 1982 before being promoted as Permanent Secretary of Ministry of Culture, Youth and Sports in 1984. In 1987, he was made a Senior State Counsel in the State Attorney-General's Chambers. He left the State Public Service in 1989 to join private sector.

=== Private sector ===
Masidi served as Chairman of Institute of Development Studies of Sabah from 1994 to 2004 and member of board of directors of Sabah Development Bank during that time. He held directorship in various companies including Chase Perdana Berhad, Sitt Tatt Berhad and Bank Rakyat. He is Chairman of Malaysian Bioeconomy Development Corporation since 24 July 2020.

=== Politics ===
Masidi joined politics in 2004 as he was nominated by United Malays National Organisation (UMNO) as candidate for Karanaan state constituency. He subsequently won the election and holds the seat for four consecutive terms. He is currently serving the fifth term in Karanaan following his victory in the 16th state election under the banner of Malaysian United Indigenous Party (BERSATU).

He rose as Minister of State for Youth and Sports in 2004. He then became Minister of State for Tourism, Culture and Environment from 2006 to 2018 and Minister of State charged with education during that time. He also briefly served as Deputy Chief Minister post-14th general election for two days. He left UMNO in 2018 to join BERSATU and subsequently became the latter's state liaison deputy chairman.

== Election results ==
Sabah State Legislative Assembly
Year	Constituency	Candidate	Votes	Pct	Opponent(s)	Votes	Pct	Ballots cast	Majority	Turnout
1990	N13 Kundasang	Masidi Manjun (USNO)	2,054	25.93%	Ewon Ebin (PBS)	4,009	50.62%	7,737	1,955	79.07%
1990	N13 Kundasang	Masidi Manjun (USNO)	2,054	25.93%	Amari Ginggor @ Mynoor (PRS)	1,269	16.02%	7,737	1,955	79.07%
1990	N13 Kundasang	Masidi Manjun (USNO)	2,054	25.93%	Samat Dimok (AKAR)	212	2.68%	7,737	1,955	79.07%
1990	N13 Kundasang	Masidi Manjun (USNO)	2,054	25.93%	Japiril Suhaimin (BERJAYA)	193	2.44%	7,737	1,955	79.07%
2004	N30 Karanaan	Masidi Manjun (Sabah UMNO)	6,519	90.72%	Mohd Mian Mohd Ali (IND)	413	5.75%	7,332	6,106	68.90%
2004	N30 Karanaan	Masidi Manjun (Sabah UMNO)	6,519	90.72%	Sutian Kendilong (SETIA)	254	3.53%	7,332	6,106	68.90%
2008	N30 Karanaan	Masidi Manjun (Sabah UMNO)	6,505	82.40%	Atin Naisin (PKR)	1,389	17.60%	8,010	5,116	72.45%
2013	N30 Karanaan	Masidi Manjun (Sabah UMNO)	6,292	58.44%	Muhiddin Anas Yusin (PKR)	2,792	25.94%	10,331	3,500	83.10%
2013	N30 Karanaan	Masidi Manjun (Sabah UMNO)	6,292	58.44%	Jalibin Paidi (STAR)	1,067	9.91%	10,331	3,500	83.10%
2013	N30 Karanaan	Masidi Manjun (Sabah UMNO)	6,292	58.44%	Mat Jaili Samat (IND)	615	5.71%	10,331	3,500	83.10%
2018	N30 Karanaan	Masidi Manjun (Sabah UMNO)	6,849	63.98%	Chong Peck Hing (PKR)	3,067	28.65%	10,928	3,782	80.80%
2018	N30 Karanaan	Masidi Manjun (Sabah UMNO)	6,849	63.98%	Aman @ Adzman Manaf (PHRS)	685	6.40%	10,928	3,782	80.80%
2018	N30 Karanaan	Masidi Manjun (Sabah UMNO)	6,849	63.98%	Juhaili Sidek (ANAK NEGERI)	104	0.97%	10,928	3,782	80.80%
2020	N37 Karanaan	Masidi Manjun (Sabah BERSATU)	6,696	73.70%	Awasi Ganie @ Yasin Abdul Ghani (WARISAN)	1,882	20.71%	9,086	4,814	67.68%
2020	N37 Karanaan	Masidi Manjun (Sabah BERSATU)	6,696	73.70%	Hadzrul Masnin (PCS)	434	4.78%	9,086	4,814	67.68%
2020	N37 Karanaan	Masidi Manjun (Sabah BERSATU)	6,696	73.70%	Md Tajuddin Sadi (USNO Baru)	74	0.81%	9,086	4,814	67.68%
2025	N37 Karanaan	Masidi Manjun (GAGASAN)	7,081	54.63%	Anuar Ghani (STAR)	1,720	13.27%	13,075	5,361	69.99%
2025	N37 Karanaan	Masidi Manjun (GAGASAN)	7,081	54.63%	Md Nadzmin Kamin (Sabah UMNO)	1,630	12.58%	13,075	5,361	69.99%
2025	N37 Karanaan	Masidi Manjun (GAGASAN)	7,081	54.63%	Karim Adam (KDM)	895	6.91%	13,075	5,361	69.99%
2025	N37 Karanaan	Masidi Manjun (GAGASAN)	7,081	54.63%	Mukinin @ Mazlan Daiman (WARISAN)	860	6.64%	13,075	5,361	69.99%
2025	N37 Karanaan	Masidi Manjun (GAGASAN)	7,081	54.63%	Georgina George (UPKO)	660	5.09%	13,075	5,361	69.99%
2025	N37 Karanaan	Masidi Manjun (GAGASAN)	7,081	54.63%	Naomi @ Neomi Francis (IND)	115	0.89%	13,075	5,361	69.99%

== Honours ==
=== Honours of Malaysia ===
- Malaysia
  - Officer of the Order of the Defender of the Realm (KMN) (2006)
  - Member of the Order of the Defender of the Realm (AMN) (1998)
- Sabah
  - Grand Commander of the Order of Kinabalu (SPDK) – Datuk Seri Panglima (2013)
  - Commander of the Order of Kinabalu (PGDK) – Datuk (1996)
  - Justice of the Peace (JP) (1994)
