= Malaysian United Indigenous Party of Sabah =

Sabah branch of a political party of Malaysia

- Malay name: Parti Pribumi Bersatu Malaysia Sabah
- Abbreviation: Sabah BERSATU / Sabah PPBM
- Chairman: Ronald Kiandee (Suspended)
- Founder: Mahathir Mohamad; Muhyiddin Yassin; Hajiji Noor
- Founded: 6 April 2019; 7 years ago
- Split from: PHRS (2019); UMNO Sabah (2019)
- Succeeded by: GAGASAN (2022) (under Hajiji Noor)
- National affiliation: Pakatan Harapan (2019–2020); Perikatan Nasional (since 2020)
- Regional affiliation: Gabungan Rakyat Sabah (2020–2022)
- Colours: Red and white
- Slogan: Bersatu, Beramanah, Bermaruah (United, Trustworthy, Dignified)
- Dewan Negara Malaysia: 0 / 70
- Dewan Rakyat Malaysia: 1 / 25 (Sabah seats)
- Sabah State Legislative Assembly: 0 / 79
- Chief ministers in Malaysia (Sabah Chief Minister): 0 / 13

Election symbol

Party flag

Malaysian United Indigenous Party of Sabah (Malay: Parti Pribumi Bersatu Malaysia Sabah), also abbreviated as Sabah BERSATU or Sabah PPBM, is the Malaysian United Indigenous Party (BERSATU) branch in Sabah, Malaysia.

The branch had effectively split from the central leadership of the Malaysian United Indigenous Party under the leadership of Hajiji Noor in March 2022 and participated in the 2022 general election in alliance with Barisan Nasional, contrary to the mother party which contested in the opposing Perikatan Nasional coalition. The branch suffered a split when Hajiji Noor left the party in December 2022 to another party named Parti Gagasan Rakyat Sabah in 2023 to make GRS coalition fully local and autonomous.

== History ==
=== 2022 general election and split ===
The Malaysian United Indigenous Party of Sabah had participated in the 2022 general election as part of the Gabungan Rakyat Sabah coalition in alliance with Barisan Nasional, with both groups supporting the formation of the unity government under Anwar Ibrahim in its aftermath. Conversely, the mother party under the leadership of president Muhyiddin Yassin, who also led the Perikatan Nasional coalition, opted to sit in opposition. This disagreement between the mother party and its Sabahan chapter was reported to be the reason for branch chairman Hajiji Noor's split from the party, bringing with him all 15 state assemblymen and four members of parliament, with the remainder of the party being expelled from the Gabungan Rakyat Sabah coalition a few days later.

The branch's sole remaining member of parliament, Ronald Kiandee, succeeded Hajiji as chairman.

== List of leaders ==
=== List of Chairmen ===
No.	Portrait	Chairmen	Term start	Term end	Time in office	Deputy Chairmen
1		Hajiji Noor (born 1956); MLA for Sulaman, since 1990	6 April 2019	10 December 2022	3 years, 248 days	Masidi Manjun (2019–2022)
During this interval, the position was vacant. (10–11 December 2022)
2		Ronald Kiandee (born 1961); MP for Beluran, since 1999	11 December 2022	25 June 2026 suspended	3 years, 338 days	Aksyah Nasrah (2023–2024); Muhammad Affan Jumahat (since 2025)

== Elected representatives ==
=== Dewan Rakyat (House of Representatives) ===
==== Members of Parliament of the 15th Malaysian Parliament ====
Sabah BERSATU has 1 member in the House of Representatives.

State	No.	Parliament Constituency	Member
Sabah	P183	Beluran	Ronald Kiandee
Total	Sabah (1)		

== General election results ==
Election	Total seats won	Seats contested	Total votes	Voting Percentage	Outcome of election	Election leader
2022	5 / 222	6 (GRS) (Sabah, except Beluran); 1 (under PN) (Beluran)	105,388	0.68%	▼2 seats; Governing coalition (Gabungan Rakyat Sabah) ▲1 seat; Opposition coalition (Perikatan Nasional)	Hajiji Noor; Ronald Kiandee

== State election results ==
State election	State Legislative Assembly	
State election	Sabah	Total won / Total contested
2/3 majority	2 / 3	2 / 3
2020 (under GRS ticket)	11 / 73	11 / 21
2025	0 / 73	0 / 33

== See also ==
- List of political parties in Malaysia
- Malaysian General Election
- Politics of Malaysia
- Barisan Nasional
- Pakatan Harapan
- Perikatan Nasional
- Gabungan Rakyat Sabah
- 2020–2022 Malaysian political crisis
- 2023 Sabah political crisis
