= Hajiji Noor =

Malaysian politician

Yang Amat Berhormat Datuk Seri Panglima Haji Hajiji Noor SPDK PGDK KMN MLA
- عزيزي نور
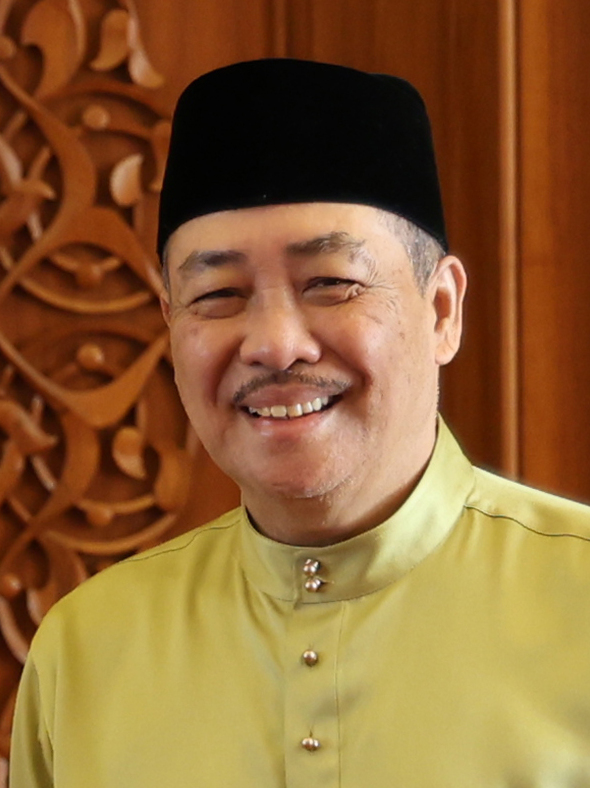
- Hajiji in 2024

16th Chief Minister of Sabah
- Incumbent
- Assumed office 29 September 2020
- Governor: Juhar Mahiruddin (2020–2024); Musa Aman (since 2025)
- Deputy: Bung Moktar Radin (2020–2023); Jeffrey Kitingan (2020–2025); Joachim Gunsalam (since 2020); Shahelmey Yahya (2023–2025); Masidi Manjun (since 2025); Ewon Benedick (since 2025)
- Preceded by: Shafie Apdal

1st Chairman of the Gabungan Rakyat Sabah
- Incumbent
- Assumed office 11 March 2022
- Deputy: Maximus Ongkili; Jeffrey Kitingan (2022–2025); Yong Teck Lee (2022–2025); Anifah Aman; Liew Yun Fah; Chin Su Phin; Pandikar Amin Mulia
- Preceded by: Position established

3rd President of Parti Gagasan Rakyat Sabah
- Incumbent
- Assumed office 5 February 2023
- Deputy: Masidi Manjun
- Vice Presidents: Mohd Arifin Mohd Arif; Rubin Balang; Masiung Banah
- Preceded by: Stephen Jacob Jimbangan (2nd President)

1st State Chairman of the Malaysian United Indigenous Party of Sabah
- In office 6 April 2019 – 10 December 2022
- Deputy: Masidi Manjun
- National President: Muhyiddin Yassin
- National Chairman: Mahathir Mohamad (2019–2020); Muhyiddin Yassin (Acting) (2020)
- Preceded by: Position established
- Succeeded by: Ronald Kiandee

Past Ministerial Roles (Sabah)
- 2004–2018: Housing and Local Government
- 2018: Deputy Chief Minister; Infrastructure Development

Past Assistant Ministerial Roles (Sabah)
- 1994: Youth and Sports
- 1994–1996: Industrial Development
- 1996–1999: Chief Minister's Department
- 1999–2002: Industrial Development
- 2002–2004: Finance

Faction represented in the Sabah State Legislative Assembly
- 1990–2018: Barisan Nasional
- 2018–2019: Independent
- 2019–2020: Pakatan Harapan
- 2020–2022: Perikatan Nasional
- 2022–: Gabungan Rakyat Sabah

Personal details
- Born: 10 May 1955 (age 71) Kampung Serusup, Tuaran, Crown Colony of North Borneo
- Party: USNO (until 1993); Sabah UMNO (1993–2018); Sabah BERSATU (2019–2022); GAGASAN (since 2023)
- Other political affiliations: BN (until 2018); PH (2019–2020); PN (2020–2022); GRS (since 2020)
- Spouse: Juliah Salag
- Children: 4, including Mohammad Ghazali
- Education: University of New Hampshire (BSc)
- Occupation: Politician

Hajiji bin Noor (Jawi: عزيزي بن نور; born 10 May 1955) is a Malaysian politician who served as the 16th Chief Minister of Sabah since 2020. The President of the GAGASAN Party, he represented Sulaman in the Sabah State Legislative Assembly since 1990.

Born in Tuaran, Sabah, he was appointed Chief Minister in late September 2020 after his coalition, Gabungan Rakyat Sabah (GRS), won 38 out of the 73 seats, in which 37 seats needed for a simple majority in the 2020 state election. His administration was further strengthened after three independent members of state legislative assembly (MLAs) pledged their support for the state government.

== Early background ==
Hajiji was born in Kampung Serusup, Tuaran as the second of three children of Noor Harun and Teruyah Omar (both now deceased). He firstly attended the Serusup Native Primary School (SK Serusup) for his primary education in 1961 before going for his secondary education in Tuaran District Government Secondary School – now known as Badin Secondary School (SMK Badin) – in 1967. After getting 15 aggregates in Lower Certificate of Education examination, he was transferred to St. John's Secondary School in 1972 and excelled in Malaysian Certificate of Education examination as one of the best students in Tuaran after his high school graduation in 1974.

== Career ==
=== Public service ===
Hajiji started his career as a public servant in 1976. He was tasked to be a radio announcer at Radio Televisyen Malaysia before being appointed as Assistant Development Officer at Tuaran District Office from 1977 to 1982.

=== Politics ===
Hajiji entered politics in 1990 as he contested in the 8th general election as a candidate for Sulaman state constituency representing United Sabah National Organisation (USNO) and subsequently won. He was appointed as Political Secretary to Deputy Prime Minister Ghafar Baba from 1992 to 1993. He was also member of the Bank Rakyat's board of directors from 1991 to 1994.

He joined United Malays National Organisation (UMNO) in 1994 following the dissolution of USNO. He became Tuaran Division Chief a year after until 2018 as well as Treasurer of UMNO Sabah from 2001 to 2018. He remained as an Assembly Member for Sulaman for six terms and is currently serving the seventh term after defeating two other candidates from Sabah Heritage Party (Warisan) and Love Sabah Party (PCS) in the 2020 state election.

He was appointed as Assistant Minister of State at the Ministry of Youth and Sports (for some times in 1994), Ministry of Industrial Development (1994 to 1996, and then 1999 to 2001), Chief Minister's Department (1996 to 1999) and Ministry of Finance (2001 to 2004). He was promoted as Minister of State for Housing and Local Government from 2004 to 2018 and as Deputy Chief Minister in the Ministry of Infrastructure Development for two days post 14th general election.

Following the fall of BN in Sabah in 2018, he was appointed Sabah UMNO Liaison Chairman. He later joined Malaysian United Indigenous Party (BERSATU) in 2018 and serves as the State chairman for Sabah since 2019. Prime Minister Muhyiddin Yassin nominated Hajiji as Chief Minister if PN win the next state election. Consequently, GRS, in which PN is a member, won the recent state election and moved to Governor Juhar Mahiruddin to name Hajiji as the next Chief Minister, in which the nomination was affirmed by Juhar the day before Hajiji's swearing-in.

In March 2022, Hajiji became the first official chairman of the registered political coalition party in Sabah, named Gabungan Rakyat Sabah Party (GRS Party). The GRS under Hajiji's leadership then formed a unity government with Pakatan Harapan (PH), Barisan Nasional (BN), Gabungan Parti Sarawak (GPS) and other parties in the aftermath of the 15th Malaysian General Election. On 10 December 2022, Hajiji and other BERSATU Sabah leaders leave BERSATU and become direct members of GRS.

On 7 January 2023, a political crisis began when Hajiji Noor lost support from 13 Sabah UMNO member due to the breach of agreement of GRS-PN-BN thus his is no longer the Chief Minister of Sabah with confirmed majority support from the Sabah House of Legislative Assembly and will be continuing to hold this position until the new Chief Minister is elected. On 29 January 2023, Hajiji Noor announced to lead Sabah People's Idea Party (PGRS). He said PGRS will be used to continue the struggle as a local party in Sabah. He added, this is also intended to ensure that no more people deny the existence of the Chief Minister of Sabah and to stop the 2023 Sabah political crisis. PGRS was also accepted by the GRS coalition as a component party on 9 December 2022. In May 2023, Hajiji Noor become the first Chief Minister of Sabah that successfully got the full majority to approved the Anti-Party Hopping Bill in Sabah for both Parliament and State Legislative Assembly.

== Family ==
Hajiji is married to Juliah Salag and has four children namely Mohd. Reza, Khairil Anuar, Nur Diyana and Mohd. Ghazali. His nephew, Busrah bin Maulah was a principal at SMK TAMAN SERAYA.

== Election results ==
Sabah State Legislative Assembly
Year	Constituency	Candidate	Votes	Pct	Opponent(s)	Votes	Pct	Ballots cast	Majority	Turnout
1990	N11 Sulaman	Hajiji Noor (USNO)	3,575	43.91%	Jahid Jahim (PBS)	3,294	40.46%	8,202	281	80.02%
1990	N11 Sulaman	Hajiji Noor (USNO)	3,575	43.91%	Kalakau Untol (AKAR)	565	6.94%	8,202	281	80.02%
1990	N11 Sulaman	Hajiji Noor (USNO)	3,575	43.91%	Aliasgar Basri (BERJAYA)	538	6.61%	8,202	281	80.02%
1990	N11 Sulaman	Hajiji Noor (USNO)	3,575	43.91%	Shafie Anterak (PRS)	120	1.47%	8,202	281	80.02%
1990	N11 Sulaman	Hajiji Noor (USNO)	3,575	43.91%	Yusof Awang Ludin (IND)	38	0.47%	8,202	281	80.02%
1990	N11 Sulaman	Hajiji Noor (USNO)	3,575	43.91%	Laugan Tarki Noor (IND)	11	0.14%	8,202	281	80.02%
1994	N11 Sulaman	Hajiji Noor (Sabah UMNO)	5,016	54.02%	Matbee Ismail (PBS)	4,140	44.59%	9,365	876	79.56%
1994	N11 Sulaman	Hajiji Noor (Sabah UMNO)	5,016	54.02%	Pengiran Othman Rauf (IND)	69	0.74%	9,365	876	79.56%
1994	N11 Sulaman	Hajiji Noor (Sabah UMNO)	5,016	54.02%	Margaret Kimon (SETIA)	60	0.65%	9,365	876	79.56%
1999	N10 Sulaman	Hajiji Noor (Sabah UMNO)	6,571	61.50%	Rakam Sijim (PBS)	3,127	29.27%	10,799	3,444	77.31%
1999	N10 Sulaman	Hajiji Noor (Sabah UMNO)	6,571	61.50%	Mohammed Daud Abdullah (BERSEKUTU)	886	8.29%	10,799	3,444	77.31%
1999	N10 Sulaman	Hajiji Noor (Sabah UMNO)	6,571	61.50%	Hamdin Adb. Kadir (SETIA)	100	0.94%	10,799	3,444	77.31%
2004	N10 Sulaman	Hajiji Noor (Sabah UMNO)	7,065	66.35%	Ansari Abdullah (keADILan)	3,583	33.65%	12,997	3,482	72.54%
2008	N10 Sulaman	Hajiji Noor (Sabah UMNO)	8,961	71.88%	Ansari Abdullah (PKR)	3,505	28.12%	12,770	5,456	79.44%
2013	N10 Sulaman	Hajiji Noor (Sabah UMNO)	13,065	78.73%	Ghulabidin Enjih (PKR)	2,624	15.80%	17,044	10,441	87.10%
2013	N10 Sulaman	Hajiji Noor (Sabah UMNO)	13,065	78.73%	Ali Akbar Kawi (IND)	615	3.71%	17,044	10,441	87.10%
2013	N10 Sulaman	Hajiji Noor (Sabah UMNO)	13,065	78.73%	David Orok (STAR)	225	1.36%	17,044	10,441	87.10%
2013	N10 Sulaman	Hajiji Noor (Sabah UMNO)	13,065	78.73%	Arifin Harith (IND)	66	0.40%	17,044	10,441	87.10%
2018	N10 Sulaman	Hajiji Noor (Sabah UMNO)	12,966	69.62%	Abdullah Sani Daud (WARISAN)	5,192	27.87%	19,055	7,774	84.30%
2018	N10 Sulaman	Hajiji Noor (Sabah UMNO)	12,966	69.62%	Arifin Harith (PHRS)	467	2.51%	19,055	7,774	84.30%
2020	N12 Sulaman	Hajiji Noor (Sabah BERSATU)	5,919	65.83%	Aliasgar Basri (WARISAN)	2,820	31.36%	8,992	3,099	76.78%
2020	N12 Sulaman	Hajiji Noor (Sabah BERSATU)	5,919	65.83%	Rekan Hussien (PCS)	253	2.81%	8,992	3,099	76.78%
2025	N12 Sulaman	Hajiji Noor (GAGASAN)	10,639	73.63%	Shahnon Rizal Thaijudin (Sabah UMNO)	1,720	11.90%	14,620	8,919	79.77%
2025	N12 Sulaman	Hajiji Noor (GAGASAN)	10,639	73.63%	Mokhtar Hussin (WARISAN)	1,383	9.57%	14,620	8,919	79.77%
2025	N12 Sulaman	Hajiji Noor (GAGASAN)	10,639	73.63%	Tiaminah @ Siti Aminah Ele (Sabah BERSATU)	385	2.66%	14,620	8,919	79.77%
2025	N12 Sulaman	Hajiji Noor (GAGASAN)	10,639	73.63%	Pajudin Nordin (IMPIAN)	322	2.23%	14,620	8,919	79.77%

== Honours ==
=== Honours of Malaysia ===
- Malaysia
  - Officer of the Order of the Defender of the Realm (KMN) (1998)
- Sabah
  - Grand Commander of the Order of Kinabalu (SPDK) – Datuk Seri Panglima (2013)
  - Commander of the Order of Kinabalu (PGDK) – Datuk (1996)

Political offices
Preceded by Shafie Apdal	Chief Minister of Sabah; 2020–	Succeeded by Incumbent
