= Sabah People's Unity Party =

- Malay name: Parti Perpaduan Rakyat Sabah
- Abbreviation: PPRS
- President: Arshad Mualap
- Founder: Arshad Mualap
- Founded: 2017
- Ideology: Sabah regionalism Social conservatism
- National affiliation: United Sabah Alliance (2017–2018)
- Colours: Yellow, red, blue and white
- Dewan Negara: 0 / 70
- Dewan Rakyat: 0 / 26 (Sabah and Labuan seats)
- Sabah State Legislative Assembly: 0 / 79

Party flag

Sabah People's Unity Party (Malay: Parti Perpaduan Rakyat Sabah, abbreviated: PPRS) is a Sabah-based-opposition party founded in 2017 by Mohd Arshad Abdul Mualap, a little known former teacher turn businessman-politician from Sungai Sibuga, the power base of former Sabah Chief Minister and the 11th Governor of Sabah, Tun Musa Aman. It is one of parties in the alliance of United Sabah Alliance (USA).

== Controversy ==
The president of Parti Perpaduan Rakyat Sabah identified as Mohd Arshad Abdul Mualap, 48, has been detained with another man – Mohamad Amkah Ahmad, 46, in Subang Jaya on 22 June 2022 and were charged in court for allegedly being the mastermind of an identification document scam syndicate.

“We believe the syndicate has been operating for at least a few months. They were selling invalid ICs for those without Malaysian citizenship,” Minister of Home Affairs Datuk Seri Hamzah Zainudin told a press conference in Bukit Aman.

== General election results ==
| Election | Total seats won | Seats contested | Total votes | Voting Percentage | Outcome of election | Election leader |
|---|---|---|---|---|---|---|
| 2018 | 0 / 222 | 3 | 2,016 | 0.02% | 0 seat; No representation in Parliament | Arshad Mualap |
| 2022 | 0 / 222 | 1 | 541 | 0.00% | 0 seat; No representation in Parliament | Arshad Mualap |

== State election results ==
Sabah State Legislative Assembly
| Election | Votes | | Seats | | | Position (Note: As part of electoral coalition.) | Status |
| Election | Count | % | Result | Won / contested | +/– | Position | Status |
|---|---|---|---|---|---|---|---|
| 2018 | 1,491 | 0.2 | 0 / 60 | 0 / 9 | Steady | 4th (United Sabah Alliance) | No seats |
| 2020 | 2,160 | 0.3 | 0 / 73 | 0 / 24 | Steady | ▼8th | No seats |
| 2025 | 1,124 | 0.1 | 0 / 73 | 0 / 16 | Steady | ▼15th | No seats |

== See also ==
- Politics of Malaysia
- List of political parties in Malaysia
