= 1989 Ranau by-election =

1989 by-election in Sabah, Malaysia

- 9 December 1989

N14 Ranau seat in the Sabah State Legislative Assembly
	PBS	AKAR	MOMOGUN
Candidate	Siringan Gubat	Mark Koding	Mohamad Rustim; Sulaiman
Party	PBS	AKAR	MOMOGUN
Alliance	BN
Popular vote	3647	2517	205
Percentage	57.26%	39.52%	3.22%
Ranau assemblyman before election
Mark Koding
AKAR (Note: Mark Koding was a member of the Parti Bersatu Sabah prior to his resignation from the party and joining Akar. At the time of his official resignation, he is a member of Akar.)
Elected Ranau assemblyman
Siringan Gubat
PBS(BN)

The 1989 Ranau by-election is a by-election for the Sabah State Legislative Assembly seat of Ranau that were held on 9 December 1989. It was called following the resignation of the incumbent, Mark Koding on 28 October 1989.

== Background ==
Mark Koding was first elected to the Sabah State Legislative Assembly seat of Ranau at the 1985 Sabah state election, as a candidate for Parti Bersatu Sabah (PBS). PBS won the election to become the new government of Sabah. He retained the seat in the state snap election held the year after, as PBS once again won the election with a bigger majority to continue governing Sabah, and within a few months after the election were accepted into Barisan Nasional, the federal government coalition at the time.

Prior to that, Mark contested as an independent and won the federal seat of Kinabalu at the 1978 Malaysian general election, defeating then incumbent Abdul Ghani Gilong of United Sabah National Organization. He then joined Sabah People's United Front (Berjaya), the party that had helped campaigned for him during the election, and won the seat again, this time uncontested, in the 1982 Malaysian general election. He has held the Kinabalu federal seat until the 1986 Malaysian general election, when he were not selected to defend the seat. By this time he had joined PBS, after exiting Berjaya in 1984 with several of the party's dissidents.

On 24 September 1989, Mark resigned from PBS to join a new party, Angkatan Keadilan Rakyat (Akar) which he had formed with Pandikar Amin Mulia (ex-PBS and USNO) and Kalakau Untol (ex-PBS). This is after he were removed from the Sabah Deputy Chief Minister role, which he had held since 1985, by PBS leader and Sabah Chief Minister Joseph Pairin Kitingan on 21 August 1989 due to accusations that he and a group of PBS members were planning a coup against Joseph. He was also stripped of PBS vice-president and Sabah Minister of Industrial Development role, and were suspended from the party membership alongside many of his supporters including Pandikar and Kalakau; both of the latter alongside many suspended members later quit PBS to setup Akar. Under the Sabah constitution at the time, assembly members who resigned from the party that he/her won the seat, have to also resign the seat.

The seat of Ranau was declared vacant by the Speaker of the Sabah State Legislative Assembly, Hassan Alban Sandukong, on 4 October 1989. However the resignation letter from Mark were only sent and confirmed by the Election Commission on 28 October 1989, causing the delay of the election dates announcement. The dates of the election, nomination and other important date were announced by Election Commission on 1 November 1989.

== Nomination and campaign ==
On the day Mark announced his resignation from PBS, 24 September 1989, he also announced he would defend the seat under his new party Akar. He also claims that he is the first assemblymen for the new party, since no dates yet have been set by Election Commission of the by-election (at the time), he is still the Ranau assemblymen. Hours after the nomination closed, it was announced that Mark will take over the Akar's pro tem party president role from the previous pro tem president, Kalakau Untol who were made Akar's deputy president.

PBS, at the time a coalition member of Barisan Nasional (BN), announced Siringan Gubat @ Alliance, Mark's ex-political secretary when he was in PBS, as their candidate. The announcement were made by its secretary general and the by-election operations director for PBS, Joseph Kurup on 7 November 1989.

Other parties expressing their interest in contesting the by-election, but at the end only Parti Momogun announced they will field their candidate, Mohamad Rustim Sulaiman in an official statement from the party on 24 November 1989.

On the nomination day, 25 November 1989, it was confirmed that there will be a 3-way fight between Siringan of PBS-BN, Mark of Akar and Rustim of Momogun after nominations closed.

During the campaigning period, Akar claimed that several top PBS assemblymen and member of parliament will join them, though the only prominent PBS members who joined them through this period are two nominated assemblymen, Saman Haji Ghulam and Amat Awang Matnassir. Both has been Assistant Minister to Chief Minister Office and political secretary to Chief Minister, respectively, and followed ex-political secretary to Minister of Industrial Development, Juhar Mahiruddin who joined Akar on nomination day.

The campaigning period is also held at the backdrop of Malaysia's Anti-Corruption Agency (ACA) probe into malpractices in Yayasan Sabah, where Joseph's brother Jeffery Kitingan is the chairman. Joseph himself is not actively campaigning in the by-election, as he were involved in the ACA's investigation. This issue have been used by Akar in their election campaign against PBS.

There were also reports of violence at party campaign.

== Timeline ==
The key dates are listed below.

Date	Event
16 November 1989	Issue of the Writ of Election
25 November 1989	Nomination Day
25 November- 8 December 1989	Campaigning Period
	Early polling day for postal and overseas voters
9 December 1989	Polling Day

== Results ==
Sabah state by-election, 9 December 1989: Ranau Upon the resignation of incumbent, Mark Koding
Party	Candidate	Votes	%	∆%
PBS	Siringan Gubat	3,647	57.26	▼4.2
Angkatan Keadilan Rakyat	Mark Koding	2,517	39.52	▲39.52
MOMOGUN	Mohamad Rustim Sulaiman	205	3.22	▲3.22
Total valid votes		6,369	100.00	
Total rejected ballots		88		
Unreturned ballots		?		
Turnout		6,457	79.02	▲3.35
Registered electors		8,171		
Majority		1,130	?	?
PBS hold		Swing		?

== Previous results ==
Sabah state election, 1986: Ranau
Party	Candidate	Votes	%	∆%
PBS	Mark Koding	3,599	61.46	▲
BERJAYA	Benedict Yasin	2,257	38.54	▼
Total valid votes		5,856	100.00	
Total rejected ballots		61		
Unreturned ballots				
Turnout		5,917	75.67	▼
Registered electors		7,819		
Majority		1,342	▲13.34	
PBS hold		Swing		

== Aftermath ==
Mark, after his defeat to Siringan, dismissed the result as a 'temporary setback' as majority gained by PBS is not big and said Akar will be more prepared in the upcoming state election. Mark will face Siringan in Ranau two more times in the future: in 1990 Sabah state election, held less than a year after this by-election, and the 1994 Sabah state election. Both times, Mark of Akar lost to Siringan of PBS.

Siringan were sworn in as the new assemblymen for Ranau on 11 December 1989 before Sabah Legislative Assembly Speaker, Hassan Alban Sandukong, together with 2 new nominated assemblymen.
