= Abidin Madingkir =

Malaysian politician

Yang Berbahagia Datuk Abidin Madingkir PGDK JSM JP MLA

State Assistant Minister to the Chief Minister of Sabah
- In office 8 October 2020 – 1 December 2025 Serving with Wetrom Bahanda (2020–2022) & Nizam Abu Bakar Titingan (2022–2025) & Ruslan Muharam (2023–2025)
- Governor: Juhar Mahiruddin
- Chief Minister: Hajiji Noor
- Preceded by: Jimmy Wong Sze Phin
- Succeeded by: Joniston Bangkuai; Ceasar Mandela Malakun; Isnin Aliasnih
- Constituency: Paginatan

Vice President of the Homeland Solidarity Party (Non-Muslim Bumiputera)
- Incumbent
- Assumed office 22 October 2021 Serving with Paul Porodong (Non-Muslim Bumiputera) (2021–2024) & Suling Isib (Non-Muslim Bumiputera) (since 2024) & Annuar Ayub (Muslim Bumiputera) (2021–2024), (Appointed) (since 2024) & Apas Nawawi Saking (Muslim Bumiputera) (since 2021) & Mohd Lin Harun (Muslim Bumiputera) (since 2024) & Stephen Teo (Chinese) (2021–2024) & Kong Soon Choi (Chinese) (since 2024) & Beverley Natalie Koh (Chinese) (since 2024) & Flovia Ng (Appointed) (since 2024)
- President: Jeffrey Kitingan

Member of the Sabah State Legislative Assembly for Paginatan
- In office 9 May 2018 – 29 November 2025
- Preceded by: Siringan Gubat (BN–UPKO)
- Succeeded by: Rusdin Riman (KDM)
- Majority: 2,066 (2018); 1,323 (2020)

Faction represented in the Sabah State Legislative Assembly
- 2018–2019: United Pasokmomogun Kadazandusun Murut Organisation
- 2019–2020: United Progressive Kinabalu Organisation
- 2020–: Gabungan Rakyat Sabah

Personal details
- Born: Abidin bin Madingkir; 28 November 1953 (age 72) Ranau, Crown Colony of North Borneo (now Sabah, Malaysia)
- Citizenship: Malaysian
- Party: United Progressive Kinabalu Organisation (UPKO) (until 2020); Homeland Solidarity Party (STAR) (since 2020)
- Other political affiliations: Barisan Nasional (BN) (until 2018); Gabungan Rakyat Sabah (GRS) (since 2020)
- Spouse: Florence Malangkig
- Occupation: Politician
- Profession: Civil servant (retired)

Yang Berhormat Datuk Abidin bin Madingkir (born 28 November 1953) is a Malaysian politician who has served as the State Assistant Minister to the Chief Minister of Sabah in the Gabungan Rakyat Sabah (GRS) state administration under Chief Minister Hajiji Noor from October 2020 to December 2025 as well as Member of Sabah State Legislative Assembly (MLA) for Paginatan from May 2018 to November 2025. He is a member of the Homeland Solidarity Party (STAR) a component party of the GRS and formerly Perikatan Nasional (PN) coalitions and was a member of the United Progressive Kinabalu Organisation (UPKO), a component party of the Pakatan Harapan (PH) and formerly Barisan Nasional (BN) coalitions. He is also the former Mayor of Kota Kinabalu City Hall and the first Dusun native from Ranau to hold this position.

== Election results ==
Sabah State Legislative Assembly
Year	Constituency	Candidate	Votes	Pct	Opponent(s)	Votes	Pct	Ballots cast	Majority	Turnout
2018	N31 Paginatan	Abidin Madingkir (UPKO)	5,666	48.83%	Julian Sidin (WARISAN)	3,600	31.01%	11,905	2,066	77.70%
2018	N31 Paginatan	Abidin Madingkir (UPKO)	5,666	48.83%	Padderin Tuliang (STAR)	1,870	16.12%	11,905	2,066	77.70%
2018	N31 Paginatan	Abidin Madingkir (UPKO)	5,666	48.83%	Satiol Indong (PCS)	362	3.14%	11,905	2,066	77.70%
2018	N31 Paginatan	Abidin Madingkir (UPKO)	5,666	48.83%	Mat Jaili Samat (PPRS)	104	0.90%	11,905	2,066	77.70%
2020	N38 Paginatan	Abidin Madingkir (STAR)	3,783	35.65%	Junaidi Sahat (UMNO)	2,460	23.18%	10,612	1,323	68.86%
2020	N38 Paginatan	Abidin Madingkir (STAR)	3,783	35.65%	Arthur Sen Siong Choo (PBS)	1,588	14.96%	10,612	1,323	68.86%
2020	N38 Paginatan	Abidin Madingkir (STAR)	3,783	35.65%	Georgina George (UPKO)	1,245	11.73%	10,612	1,323	68.86%
2020	N38 Paginatan	Abidin Madingkir (STAR)	3,783	35.65%	Amru Abd Kadir (PCS)	905	8.53%	10,612	1,323	68.86%
2020	N38 Paginatan	Abidin Madingkir (STAR)	3,783	35.65%	Henrynus Amin (PKAN)	349	3.29%	10,612	1,323	68.86%
2020	N38 Paginatan	Abidin Madingkir (STAR)	3,783	35.65%	Liong Sun Min (LDP)	118	1.11%	10,612	1,323	68.86%
2020	N38 Paginatan	Abidin Madingkir (STAR)	3,783	35.65%	Kamil Kasibun (USNO Baru)	112	1.06%	10,612	1,323	68.86%
2020	N38 Paginatan	Abidin Madingkir (STAR)	3,783	35.65%	Bensin Dani (GAGASAN)	52	0.49%	10,612	1,323	68.86%

== Honours ==
=== Honours of Malaysia ===
- Malaysia
  - Companion of the Order of Loyalty to the Crown of Malaysia (JSM) (2010)
- Sabah
  - Commander of the Order of Kinabalu (PGDK) – Datuk (1998)
  - Justice of the Peace (JP) (2012)
