= Ranau (federal constituency) =

Federal constituency of Sabah, Malaysia

Ranau (P179)
Sabah constituency
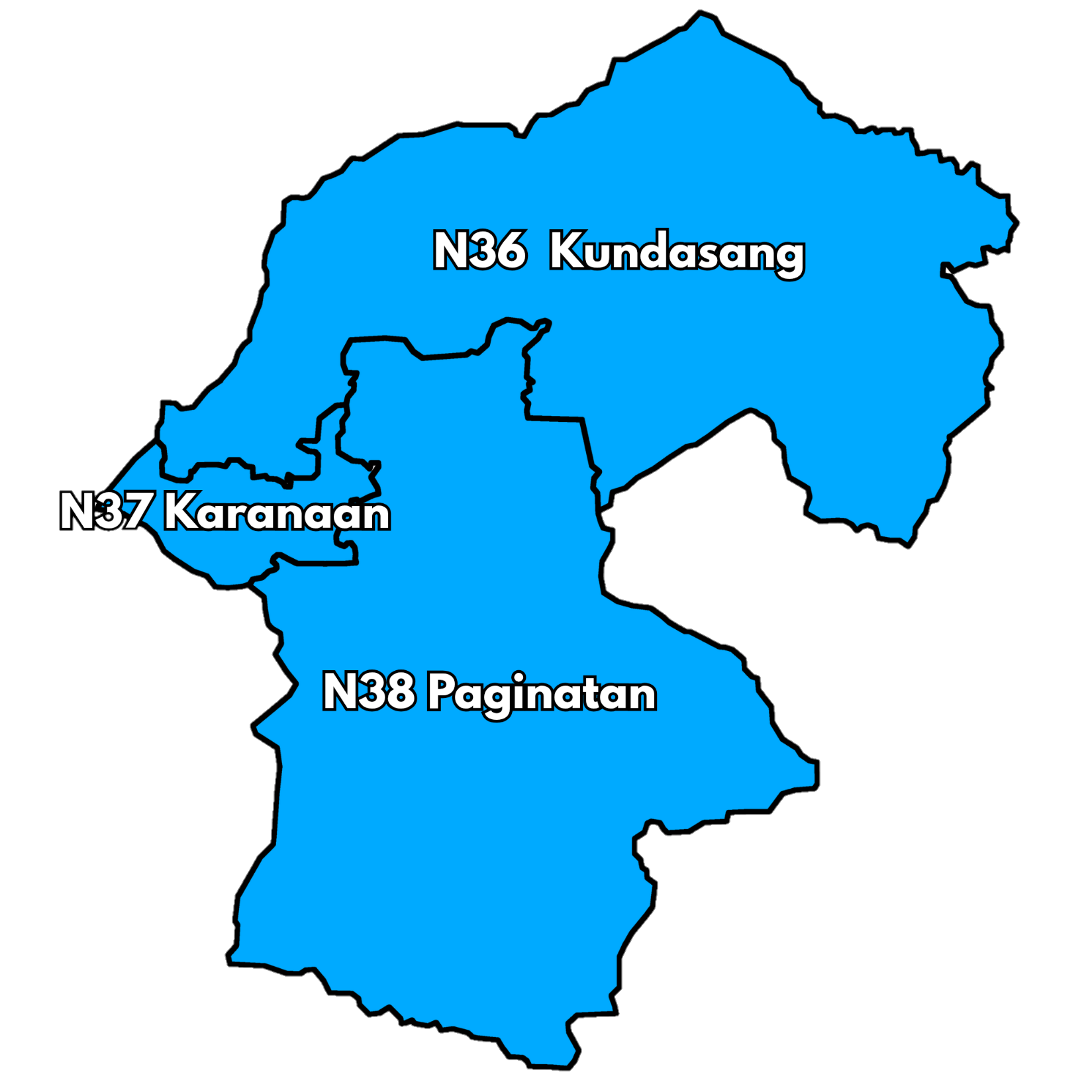

Federal constituency
- Legislature: Dewan Rakyat
- MP: Jonathan Yasin; GRS
- Constituency created: 2003
- First contested: 2004
- Last contested: 2022

Demographics
- Population (2020): 86,084
- Electors (2025): 70,159
- Area (km²): 3,891
- Pop. density (per km²): 22.1

Ranau is a federal constituency in West Coast Division (Ranau District), Sabah, Malaysia, that has been represented in the Dewan Rakyat since 2004.

The federal constituency was created in the 2003 redistribution and is mandated to return a single member to the Dewan Rakyat under the first past the post voting system.

== Demographics ==
https://ge15.orientaldaily.com.my/seats/sabah/p

Ethnic breakdown of Ranau's electorate as of 2022
1. Sabah Bumiputera (82.7%)
2. Malay-Muslim Bumiputera (11.9%)
3. Chinese (4.00%)
4. Other ethnicities (1.40%)

As of 2020, Ranau has a population of 86,084 people.

Age breakdown of Ranau's electorate as of 2022
1. 18-20 (7.66%)
2. 21-29 (24.3%)
3. 30-39 (25.1%)
4. 40-49 (16.7%)
5. 50-59 (12.0%)
6. 60-69 (8.20%)
7. 70-79 (3.35%)
8. 80-89 (1.67%)
9. above 90 (1.06%)
Gender breakdown of Ranau's electorate as of 2022
1. Male (50.3%)
2. Female (49.7%)

== History ==
=== Polling districts ===
According to the gazette issued on 21 November 2025, the Ranau constituency has a total of 52 polling districts.

State constituency	Polling Districts	Code	Location
Kundasang（N36）	Bundu Tuhan	179/36/01	SMK Bundu Tuhan
Kundasang（N36）	Kundasang	179/36/02	SK Kundasang; SK Mesilou
Kundasang（N36）	Pinausok	179/36/03	SK Pinausok
Kundasang（N36）	Perancangan	179/36/04	SK Perancangan
Kundasang（N36）	Pinawantai	179/36/05	SK Pinawantai Ranau; SK Tibabar
Kundasang（N36）	Timbua	179/36/06	SMK Timbua
Kundasang（N36）	Nawanon	179/36/07	SK Naradan (Nawanon)
Kundasang（N36）	Ulu Sugut	179/36/08	SK Malinsau; SK Sri Gabungan
Kundasang（N36）	Mangkapoh	179/36/09	SK Mangkapoh
Kundasang（N36）	Karagasan	179/36/10	SK Karagasan
Kundasang（N36）	Kaingaran	179/36/11	SK Kaingaran
Kundasang（N36）	Kilanas	179/36/12	SK Kawiyan Sugut
Kundasang（N36）	Langsat	179/36/13	SK Langsat
Karanaan（N37）	Paka	179/37/01	SK Pekan Ranau
Karanaan（N37）	Pekan Ranau	179/37/02	SMK Mat Salleh Ranau
Karanaan（N37）	Tambiau	179/37/03	Mini Dewan Kampung Tambiau
Karanaan（N37）	Tagudon	179/37/04	SK Tagudon Lama
Karanaan（N37）	Karanaan	179/37/05	SK Karanaan
Karanaan（N37）	Tungou	179/37/06	SK Tungou
Karanaan（N37）	Randagong	179/37/07	SK Randagong
Karanaan（N37）	Lipasu	179/37/08	SK Kimondou
Karanaan（N37）	Mohimboyon	179/37/09	SK Mohimboyon
Karanaan（N37）	Toboh	179/37/10	SK Toboh
Karanaan（N37）	Ratau	179/37/11	SK Ratau
Karanaan（N37）	Kamburongoh	179/37/12	SK Kamburongoh
Karanaan（N37）	Sumaang	179/37/13	SJK (C) Pai Wen
Karanaan（N37）	Kimolohing	179/37/14	SK St Benedict
Karanaan（N37）	Kinarasan	179/37/15	SK Kinirasan
Karanaan（N37）	Waang	179/37/16	SK Waang
Karanaan（N37）	Tudan	179/37/17	SK Tudan
Paginatan（N38）	Lohan	179/38/01	SMK Lohan
Paginatan（N38）	Bongkud	179/38/02	SK Bongkud
Paginatan（N38）	Kilimu	179/38/03	SK Kilimu
Paginatan（N38）	Libang	179/38/04	SK Kampong Libang
Paginatan（N38）	Kituntul	179/38/05	SK Kituntul
Paginatan（N38）	Nalapak	179/38/06	SK Nalapak
Paginatan（N38）	Suminimpod	179/38/07	SK Kepangian
Paginatan（N38）	Longut	179/38/08	SK Longut
Paginatan（N38）	Paus	179/38/09	SK Paus
Paginatan（N38）	Paginatan	179/38/10	SK Paginatan
Paginatan（N38）	Kinapulidan	179/38/11	SK Kinapulidan
Paginatan（N38）	Tinanom	179/38/12	SK Tinanom
Paginatan（N38）	Tampios	179/38/13	SK Tampios
Paginatan（N38）	Miruru	179/38/14	SK Miruru
Paginatan（N38）	Tiang	179/38/15	SK Tiang
Paginatan（N38）	Noopung	179/38/16	SK Napong
Paginatan（N38）	Narawang	179/38/17	SK Narawang
Paginatan（N38）	Marakau	179/38/18	SK Marakau
Paginatan（N38）	Kandawayon	179/38/19	SK Kandawayon
Paginatan（N38）	Sagindai	179/38/20	SK Sagindai
Paginatan（N38）	Nampasan	179/38/21	SK Nampasan
Paginatan（N38）	Matupang	179/38/22	SMK Matupang Jaya

=== Representation history ===
Members of Parliament for Ranau
Parliament	No	Years	Member	Party	Vote Share
Constituency created, renamed from Kinabalu
11th	P179	2004-2008	Bernard Giluk Dompok	BN (UPKO)	7,542; 40.52%
12th	P179	2008-2013	Siringan Gubat	BN (UPKO)	14,074; 65.41%
13th	P179	2013-2018	Ewon Ebin	BN (UPKO)	15,434; 50.22%
14th	P179	2018-2020	Jonathan Yasin	PH (PKR)	14,880; 45.17%
14th	P179	2020–2022	Jonathan Yasin	GRS (BERSATU)	14,880; 45.17%
15th	P179	2022	Jonathan Yasin	GRS (BERSATU)	22,606; 53.44%
15th	P179	2022–present	Jonathan Yasin	GRS (Direct)	22,606; 53.44%

=== State constituency ===
Parliamentary constituency	State constituency					
Parliamentary constituency	1967–1974	1974–1985	1985–1995	1995–2004	2004–2020	2020–present
Ranau					Karanaan	
Ranau					Kundasang	
Ranau					Paginatan	

=== Historical boundaries ===
State Constituency	Area	
State Constituency	2003	2019
Karanaan	Dombotuon; Kampung Sandatan; Mohimboyon; Somuru; Takurik	Dombotuon; Kampung Sandatan; Liposu Baru; Mohimboyon; Takurik
Kundasang	Karagasan; Kauluan; Kundasang; Mansulu; Ulu Sugut	Karagasan; Kundasang; Mansulu; Somuru; Ulu Sugut
Paginatan	Bunakon; Kawanahon; Kokob; Nampasan; Paginatan	Bunakon; Kawanahon; Kokob; Marakau; Nampasan

=== Current state assembly members ===
No.	State Constituency	Member	Coalition (Party)
N36	Kundasang	Joachim Gunsalam	GRS (PBS)
N37	Karanaan	Masidi Manjun	GRS (GAGASAN)
N38	Paginatan	Rusdin Riman	KDM

=== Local governments & postcodes ===
No.	State Constituency	Local Government	Postcode
N36	Kundasang	Ranau District Council	89300, 89308 Ranau
N37	Karanaan	Ranau District Council	89300, 89308 Ranau
N38	Paginatan	Ranau District Council	89300, 89308 Ranau

== Election results ==
Malaysian general election, 2022
Party	Candidate	Votes	%	∆%
GRS	Jonathan Yasin	22,606	53.44	▲53.44
PH	Taufik Dahlan	11,514	27.22	▲27.22
Parti Bersatu Rakyat Sabah	Ewon Ebin	4,254	10.06	▲10.06
Heritage	Markos Siton	2,657	6.28	▲6.28
PEJUANG	Azizul Julirin	1,267	3.00	▲3.00
Total valid votes		42,298	100.00	
Total rejected ballots		383		
Unreturned ballots		130		
Turnout		42,811	63.59	▼13.98
Registered electors		66,517		
Majority		11,092	26.22	▲22.95
GRS gain from PKR		Swing		?
Source(s) https://lom.agc.gov.my/ilims/upload/portal/akta/outputp/1753262/PUB619_2022.pdf

Malaysian general election, 2018
Party	Candidate	Votes	%	∆%
PKR	Jonathan Yasin	14,880	45.17	▲6.70
BN	Ewon Ebin	13,804	41.90	▼8.32
Homeland Solidarity Party	Soudi @ Sami Andang	3,148	9.56	▲1.23
Love Sabah Party	Andau Yasun @ Bruno	1,110	3.37	▲3.37
Total valid votes		32,942	100.00	
Total rejected ballots		769		
Unreturned ballots		193		
Turnout		33,904	77.57	▼2.98
Registered electors		43,706		
Majority		1,076	3.27	▼8.48
PKR gain from BN		Swing		?
Source(s) "His Majesty's Government Gazette - Notice of Contested Election, Parliament for the State of Sabah [P.U. (B) 246/2018]" (PDF). Attorney General's Chambers of Malaysia. 3 May 2018. "Federal Government Gazette - Results of Contested Election and Statements of the Poll after the Official Addition of Votes, Parliamentary Constituencies for the State of Sabah [P.U. (B) 320/2018]" (PDF). Attorney General's Chambers of Malaysia. 28 May 2018. Archived from the original (PDF) on 2019-12-29.

Malaysian general election, 2013
Party	Candidate	Votes	%	∆%
BN	Ewon Ebin	15,434	50.22	▲15.19
PKR	Jonathan Yasin	11,823	38.47	▲6.76
STAR	Julianah Situn @ Widya Julia	2,559	8.33	▲8.33
Independent	Yazid Sahjinan	914	2.97	▲2.97
Total valid votes		30,730	100.00	
Total rejected ballots		666		
Unreturned ballots		62		
Turnout		31,458	80.55	▲8.49
Registered electors		39,053		
Majority		3,611	11.75	▼21.95
BN hold		Swing		
Source(s) "Federal Government Gazette - Notice of Contested Election, Parliament for the State of Sabah [P.U. (B) 183/2013]" (PDF). Attorney General's Chambers of Malaysia. 26 April 2013. Archived from the original (PDF) on 2018-09-30. "Federal Government Gazette - Results of Contested Election and Statements of the Poll after the Official Addition of Votes, Parliamentary Constituencies for the State of Sabah [P.U. (B) 224/2013]" (PDF). Attorney General's Chambers of Malaysia. 22 May 2013. Archived from the original (PDF) on 2018-09-30.

Malaysian general election, 2008
Party	Candidate	Votes	%	∆%
BN	Siringan Gubat	14,074	65.41	▲24.89
PKR	Jonathan Yasin	6,823	31.71	▲31.71
Independent	Vitos Mark Koding	619	2.88	▲2.88
Total valid votes		21,516	100.00	
Total rejected ballots		653		
Unreturned ballots		32		
Turnout		22,201	72.06	▲1.67
Registered electors		30,810		
Majority		7,251	33.70	▲26.25
BN hold		Swing		

Malaysian general election, 2004
Party	Candidate	Votes	%
BN	Bernard Giluk Dompok	7,547	40.52
Independent	Ruhimin Adzim @ Ruhimin Ajim	6,160	33.07
Independent	Karim Adam	3,310	17.77
Independent	Japiril Suhaimin	1,609	8.64
Total valid votes		18,626	100.00
Total rejected ballots		775	
Unreturned ballots		298	
Turnout		19,699	70.39
Registered electors			
Majority		1,387	7.45
This was a new constituency created.
