= Joachim Gunsalam =

Malaysian politician and physician (born 1958)

Yang Berhormat Datuk Seri Panglima Dr. Joachim Gunsalam SPDK PGDK JP MLA

Deputy Chief Minister of Sabah
- Incumbent
- Assumed office 1 December 2025 (as Deputy Chief Minister of Sabah I) Serving with: Masidi Manjun (Deputy Chief Minister II) &; Ewon Benedick (Deputy Chief Minister III)
- Governor: Musa Aman
- Chief Minister: Hajiji Noor
- Preceded by: Jeffrey Kitingan
- Constituency: Kundasang
- In office 11 January 2023 – 30 November 2025 (as Deputy Chief Minister of Sabah II) Serving with: Jeffrey Kitingan (Deputy Chief Minister I) &; Shahelmey Yahya (Deputy Chief Minister III)
- Governor: Juhar Mahiruddin (2023–2024); Musa Aman (2025)
- Chief Minister: Hajiji Noor
- Preceded by: Jeffrey Kitingan
- Succeeded by: Masidi Manjun
- Constituency: Kundasang
- In office 29 September 2020 – 10 January 2023 (as Deputy Chief Minister of Sabah III) Serving with: Bung Moktar Radin (Deputy Chief Minister I) &; Jeffrey Kitingan (Deputy Chief Minister II)
- Governor: Juhar Mahiruddin
- Chief Minister: Hajiji Noor
- Preceded by: Christina Liew Chin Jin
- Succeeded by: Shahelmey Yahya
- Constituency: Kundasang

State Minister of Works and Utilities of Sabah
- Incumbent
- Assumed office 1 December 2025
- Governor: Musa Aman
- Chief Minister: Hajiji Noor
- Assistants: Limus Jury &; Ruddy Awah
- Preceded by: Shahelmey Yahya
- Constituency: Kundasang

State Minister of Housing and Local Government of Sabah
- In office 11 January 2023 – 30 November 2025
- Governor: Juhar Mahiruddin
- Chief Minister: Hajiji Noor
- Assistants: Isnin Aliasnih &; Mohamad Hamsan Awang Supain (2023–January 2025)
- Preceded by: Masidi Manjun
- Succeeded by: Mohd Arifin Mohd Arif
- Constituency: Kundasang

State Minister of Industrial Development of Sabah
- In office 29 September 2020 – 10 January 2023
- Governor: Juhar Mahiruddin
- Chief Minister: Hajiji Noor
- Assistant: Mohd Tamin Zainal
- Preceded by: Position established
- Succeeded by: Phoong Jin Zhe
- Constituency: Kundasang

State Assistant Minister of Housing and Local Government of Sabah
- In office 15 May 2013 – 3 April 2018
- Governor: Juhar Mahiruddin
- Chief Minister: Musa Aman
- Succeeded by: George Hiew Vun Zin
- Constituency: Kundasang

Member of the Sabah State Legislative Assembly for Kundasang
- Incumbent
- Assumed office 21 March 2004
- Preceded by: Karim Adam (PBS)
- Majority: 1,997 (2004); 1,806 (2008); 1,975 (2013); 255 (2018); 1,422 (2020); 1,031 (2025)

President of the United Sabah Party
- Incumbent
- Assumed office 1 June 2024 (Acting: 1 June 2024 – 26 September 2026)
- Deputy: Joniston Bangkuai (Non-Muslim Bumiputera) (since 2026) &; Jahid Jahim (2024–2026), Ruslan Muharam (since 2026) (Muslim Bumiputera) &; Yee Moh Chai (2024–2026), Lo Su Fui (since 2026) (Chinese)
- Preceded by: Maximus Ongkili

Deputy President of the United Sabah Party (Non-Muslim Bumiputera)
- In office 30 June 2022 – 26 September 2026 Serving with: Jahid Jahim (Muslim Bumiputera) &; Yee Moh Chai (Chinese)
- President: Maximus Ongkili
- Preceded by: Radin Malleh
- Succeeded by: Joniston Bangkuai

Personal details
- Born: Joachim Gunsalam; 22 January 1958 (age 68) Kundasang, Ranau, Crown Colony of North Borneo (now Sabah, Malaysia)
- Citizenship: Malaysia
- Party: United Sabah Party (PBS)
- Other political affiliations: Barisan Nasional (BN) (2002–2018); Gabungan Rakyat Sabah (GRS) (since 2020)
- Spouse: Linda Ewit
- Education: National University of Malaysia (MD)
- Occupation: Politician
- Profession: Physician
- Joachim Gunsalam on Facebook

Joachim Gunsalam (born 22 January 1958) is a Malaysian politician and physician who has served as the Deputy Chief Minister I of Sabah and State Minister of Works and Utilities of Sabah in the Gabungan Rakyat Sabah (GRS) state administration under Chief Minister Hajiji Noor since December 2025, as well as Member of the Sabah State Legislative Assembly (MLA) for Kundasang since March 2004. He previously served as State Minister of Housing and Local Government of Sabah from January 2023 until November 2025. He is a member of the United Sabah Party (PBS), a component party of the Gabungan Rakyat Sabah (GRS) and formerly Barisan Nasional (BN) coalitions. He served as the Acting President of PBS from June 2024 until he officially hold the post since September 2026. He previously served as Deputy President of PBS for the Non-Muslim Bumiputera quota from June 2022 until September 2026.

== Career ==
He was appointed as one of the Deputy Chief Ministers of Sabah as part of the victorious Gabungan Rakyat Sabah coalition in the 2020 and 2025 state elections.

== Election results ==
Sabah State Legislative Assembly
Year	Constituency		Votes	Pct	Opponent(s)	Votes	Pct	Ballots cast	Majority	Turnout
2004	N29 Kundasang	Joachim Gunsalam (PBS)	3,091	54.12%	Kaibi Laiman (SETIA)	1,097	19.21%	5,931	1,997	68.31%
2004	N29 Kundasang	Joachim Gunsalam (PBS)	3,091	54.12%	Arimin Moidi (IND)	1,075	18.82%	5,931	1,997	68.31%
2004	N29 Kundasang	Joachim Gunsalam (PBS)	3,091	54.12%	Asidin Teilok (keADILan)	448	7.85%	5,931	1,997	68.31%
2008	N29 Kundasang	Joachim Gunsalam (PBS)	3,597	54.77%	Japiril Suhaimin (IND)	1,791	27.26%	6,780	1,806	70.47%
2008	N29 Kundasang	Joachim Gunsalam (PBS)	3,597	54.77%	Karim Adam (PKR)	1,180	17.97%	6,780	1,806	70.47%
2013	N29 Kundasang	Joachim Gunsalam (PBS)	4,206	41.93%	Satiol Indong (PKR)	2,231	22.23%	10,295	1,975	77.40%
2013	N29 Kundasang	Joachim Gunsalam (PBS)	4,206	41.93%	Japiril Suhaimin (SAPP)	2,102	20.96%	10,295	1,975	77.40%
2013	N29 Kundasang	Joachim Gunsalam (PBS)	4,206	41.93%	Jain Sauting (STAR)	1,117	11.14%	10,295	1,975	77.40%
2013	N29 Kundasang	Joachim Gunsalam (PBS)	4,206	41.93%	Sam Hondou (IND)	288	2.87%	10,295	1,975	77.40%
2013	N29 Kundasang	Joachim Gunsalam (PBS)	4,206	41.93%	Cleftus Stephen Spine (IND)	87	0.87%	10,295	1,975	77.40%
2018	N29 Kundasang	Joachim Gunsalam (PBS)	3,971	37.14%	Siriman Basir (WARISAN)	3,716	34.76%	11,070	255	74.50%
2018	N29 Kundasang	Joachim Gunsalam (PBS)	3,971	37.14%	Japiril Suhaimin (STAR)	2,105	19.69%	11,070	255	74.50%
2018	N29 Kundasang	Joachim Gunsalam (PBS)	3,971	37.14%	Henrynus Amin (ANAK NEGERI)	733	6.86%	11,070	255	74.50%
2018	N29 Kundasang	Joachim Gunsalam (PBS)	3,971	37.14%	Jinus Sodiong (PKS)	166	1.55%	11,070	255	74.50%
2020	N36 Kundasang	Joachim Gunsalam (PBS)	4,332	43.35%	Siriman Basir (WARISAN)	2,910	29.12%	9,994	1,422	66.69%
2020	N36 Kundasang	Joachim Gunsalam (PBS)	4,332	43.35%	Ewon Ebin (PCS)	2,384	23.85%	9,994	1,422	66.69%
2020	N36 Kundasang	Joachim Gunsalam (PBS)	4,332	43.35%	Jeafry Goh Kautah (LDP)	293	2.93%	9,994	1,422	66.69%
2020	N36 Kundasang	Joachim Gunsalam (PBS)	4,332	43.35%	Osman Marajin (USNO Baru)	75	0.75%	9,994	1,422	66.69%
2025	N36 Kundasang	Joachim Gunsalam (PBS)	4,640	28.97%	Jackson Musi (IND)	3,609	22.53%	16,219	1,031	65.98%
2025	N36 Kundasang	Joachim Gunsalam (PBS)	4,640	28.97%	Jattry Abie @ Jeffry Mohd Ali (KDM)	2,833	17.69%	16,219	1,031	65.98%
2025	N36 Kundasang	Joachim Gunsalam (PBS)	4,640	28.97%	Japirin Sahadi (PBRS)	1,877	11.72%	16,219	1,031	65.98%
2025	N36 Kundasang	Joachim Gunsalam (PBS)	4,640	28.97%	Japiril Suhaimin (SAPP)	1,279	7.99%	16,219	1,031	65.98%
2025	N36 Kundasang	Joachim Gunsalam (PBS)	4,640	28.97%	Jeffrey Gopog (WARISAN)	986	6.16%	16,219	1,031	65.98%
2025	N36 Kundasang	Joachim Gunsalam (PBS)	4,640	28.97%	Rogers Tiam (UPKO)	530	3.31%	16,219	1,031	65.98%
2025	N36 Kundasang	Joachim Gunsalam (PBS)	4,640	28.97%	Atong Antong (Sabah BERSATU)	154	0.96%	16,219	1,031	65.98%
2025	N36 Kundasang	Joachim Gunsalam (PBS)	4,640	28.97%	Edward Jamkim (IMPIAN)	64	0.40%	16,219	1,031	65.98%
2025	N36 Kundasang	Joachim Gunsalam (PBS)	4,640	28.97%	Nazarul Khaiwala Wahab (ANAK NEGERI)	44	0.27%	16,219	1,031	65.98%

== Honours ==
- Sabah
  - Grand Commander of the Order of Kinabalu (SPDK) – Datuk Seri Panglima (2022)
  - Commander of the Order of Kinabalu (PGDK) – Datuk (2012)
  - Companion of the Order of Kinabalu (ASDK) (2006)
  - Justice of the Peace (JP) (2024)
