= Kundasang (state constituency) =

State constituency in Sabah, Malaysia

Kundasang (N36)
Sabah constituency

State constituency
- Legislature: Sabah State Legislative Assembly
MLA
Joachim Gunsalam
GRS
- Constituency created: 1974
- First contested: 1974
- Last contested: 2025

Demographics
- Population (2020): 31,177
- Electors (2025): 24,582

Kundasang is a state constituency in Sabah, Malaysia, that is represented in the Sabah State Legislative Assembly.

== Demographics ==
As of 2020, Kundasang has a population of 31,177 people.

Ethnic breakdown of Kundasang's electorate as of 2025
1. Non-Muslim Bumiputera (51.7%)
2. Muslim Bumiputera (48.0%)
3. Chinese (0.30%)
4. Other ethnicities (0.00%)

== History ==
=== Polling districts ===
According to the gazette issued on 31 October 2022, the Kundasang constituency has a total of 13 polling districts.

State constituency	Polling Districts	Code	Location
Kundasang（N36）	Bundu Tuhan	179/36/01	SMK Bundu Tuhan
Kundasang（N36）	Kundasang	179/36/02	SK Kundasang; SK Mesilou
Kundasang（N36）	Pinausok	179/36/03	SK Pinausok
Kundasang（N36）	Perancangan	179/36/04	SK Perancangan
Kundasang（N36）	Pinawantai	179/36/05	SK Pinawantai Ranau; SK Tibabar
Kundasang（N36）	Timbua	179/36/06	SMK Timbua
Kundasang（N36）	Nawanon	179/36/07	SK Naradan (Nawanon)
Kundasang（N36）	Ulu Sugut	179/36/08	SK Malinsau
Kundasang（N36）	Mangkapoh	179/36/09	SK Mangkapoh
Kundasang（N36）	Karagasan	179/36/10	SK Karagasan
Kundasang（N36）	Kaingaran	179/36/11	SK Kaingaran
Kundasang（N36）	Kilanas	179/36/12	SK Kawiyan Sugut
Kundasang（N36）	Langsat	179/36/13	SK Langsat

=== Representation history ===
Member of Sabah State Legislative Assembly for Kundasang
Assembly	No	Years	Member	Party
Constituency created from Ranau
5th	N16	1976	Amari Ginggor @ Mynoor Ginggor	BERJAYA
5th	N16	1976 – 1981	Amari Ginggor @ Mynoor Ginggor	BN (BERJAYA)
6th	N16	1981 – 1985	Amari Ginggor @ Mynoor Ginggor	BN (BERJAYA)
7th	N13	1985 – 1986	Ewon Ebin	PBS
8th	N13	1986 – 1990	Ewon Ebin	PBS
9th	N13	1990 – 1994	Ewon Ebin	GR (PBS)
10th	N13	1994	Ewon Ebin	GR (PBS)
10th	N13	1994 – 1999	Ewon Ebin	BN (PDS)
11th	N25	1999 – 2002	Karim Adam	PBS
11th	N25	2002 – 2004	Karim Adam	BN (PBS)
12th	N29	2004 – 2008	Joachim Gunsalam	BN (PBS)
13th	N29	2008 – 2013	Joachim Gunsalam	BN (PBS)
14th	N29	2013 – 2018	Joachim Gunsalam	BN (PBS)
15th	N29	2018	Joachim Gunsalam	BN (PBS)
15th	N29	2018 – 2020	Joachim Gunsalam	PBS
16th	N36	2020–2025	Joachim Gunsalam	GRS (PBS)
17th	N36	2025–present	Joachim Gunsalam	GRS (PBS)

== Election results ==
Sabah state election, 2025
Party	Candidate	Votes	%	∆%
GRS	Joachim Gunsalam	4,640	28.97	▲28.97
Independent	Jackson Musi	3,609	22.53	▲22.53
KDM	Jeffry Mohd Ali	2,833	17.69	▲17.69
BN	Japirin Sahadi	1,877	11.72	▲11.72
SAPP	Japiril Suhaimin Bandaran	1,279	7.99	▲7.99
Heritage	Jeffrey Gupong	986	6.16	▲6.16
UPKO	Rogers Tiam @ Aloysius	530	3.31	▲3.31
PN	Atong Antong	154	0.96	▲0.96
Sabah Dream Party	Edward Jamkim @ Paul Arif	64	0.40	▲0.40
Sabah Native Co-operation Party	Nazarul Khaiwala Wahab	44	0.27	▲0.27
Total valid votes		16,016		
Total rejected ballots		194		
Unreturned ballots		9		
Turnout		16,219	65.98	▼2.22
Registered electors		24,582		
Majority		1,031	6.44	▼7.48
GRS gain from PBS		Swing		?
Source(s) "RESULTS OF CONTESTED ELECTION AND STATEMENTS OF THE POLL AFTER THE OFFICIAL ADDITION OF VOTES" (PDF).

Sabah state election, 2020
Party	Candidate	Votes	%	∆%
PBS	Joachim Gunsalam	4,332	42.39	▲42.39
Sabah Heritage Party	Siriman Basir	2,910	28.47	▼5.10
Love Sabah Party	Ewon Ebin	2,384	23.33	▲23.33
LDP	Jeafry Goh Kautah	293	2.87	▲2.87
GAGASAN	Osman Marajin	75	0.73	▲0.73
Total valid votes		9,994	97.79	
Total rejected ballots		205	2.01	
Unreturned ballots		21	0.21	
Turnout		10,220	68.20	▼6.28
Registered electors		14,986		
Majority		1,422	13.92	▲11.62
PBS gain from BN		Swing		?
Source(s) "RESULTS OF CONTESTED ELECTION AND STATEMENTS OF THE POLL AFTER THE OFFICIAL ADDITION OF VOTES".

Sabah state election, 2018
Party	Candidate	Votes	%	∆%
BN	Joachim Gunsalam	3,971	35.87	▼4.94
Sabah Heritage Party	Siriman Basir	3,716	33.57	▲33.57
STAR	Japiril Suhaimin	2,105	19.02	▲8.18
Sabah Native Co-operation Party	Henrynus Amin	733	6.62	▲6.62
Sabah Nationality Party	Jinus Sodiong	166	1.50	▲1.50
Total valid votes		10,691	96.58	
Total rejected ballots		325	2.94	
Unreturned ballots		54	0.49	
Turnout		11,070	74.48	▼2.89
Registered electors		14,864		
Majority		255	2.30	▼16.86
BN hold		Swing		
Source(s) "RESULTS OF CONTESTED ELECTION AND STATEMENTS OF THE POLL AFTER THE OFFICIAL ADDITION OF VOTES".

Sabah state election, 2013
Party	Candidate	Votes	%	∆%
BN	Joachim Gunsalam	4,206	40.81	▼12.14
PKR	Satiol Indong	2,231	21.65	▲4.28
SAPP	Japiril Suhaimin	2,102	20.39	▲20.39
STAR	Jain Sauting	1,117	10.84	▲10.84
Independent	Sam Hondou	288	2.79	▲2.79
Independent	Cleftus Stephen Spine	87	0.84	▲0.84
Total valid votes		10,031	97.32	
Total rejected ballots		264	2.56	
Unreturned ballots		12	0.12	
Turnout		10,307	77.37	▲6.90
Registered electors		13,322		
Majority		1,975	19.16	▼7.42
BN hold		Swing		
Source(s) "KEPUTUSAN PILIHAN RAYA UMUM DEWAN UNDANGAN NEGERI".

Sabah state election, 2008
Party	Candidate	Votes	%	∆%
BN	Joachim Gunsalam	3,597	52.95	▲0.83
Independent	Japiril Suhaimin	1,791	26.37	▲26.37
PKR	Karim Adam	1,180	17.37	▲9.82
Total valid votes		6,568	96.69	
Total rejected ballots		212	3.12	
Unreturned ballots		13	0.19	
Turnout		6,793	70.47	▲2.16
Registered electors		9,639		
Majority		1,806	26.58	▼7.09
BN hold		Swing		
Source(s) "KEPUTUSAN PILIHAN RAYA UMUM DEWAN UNDANGAN NEGERI SABAH BAGI TAHUN 2008".

Sabah state election, 2004
Party	Candidate	Votes	%	∆%
BN	Joachim Gunsalam	3,091	52.12	▲6.38
SETIA	Kaibi Laiman	1,094	18.45	▲17.65
Independent	Arimin Moidi	1,075	18.13	▲18.13
PKR	Asidin Teilok	448	7.55	▲7.55
Total valid votes		5,708	96.24	
Total rejected ballots		212	3.57	
Unreturned ballots		13	0.22	
Turnout		5,931	68.31	▼9.41
Registered electors		8,683		
Majority		1,997	33.67	▲32.57
BN gain from PBS		Swing		?
Source(s) "KEPUTUSAN PILIHAN RAYA UMUM DEWAN UNDANGAN NEGERI SABAH BAGI TAHUN 2004".

Sabah state election, 1999
Party	Candidate	Votes	%	∆%
PBS	Karim Adam	4,201	46.84	▼7.72
BN	Ewon Ebin	4,102	45.74	▲1.52
BERSEKUTU	Ramdi Indang	481	5.36	▲5.36
SETIA	Benjimin Yasin	72	0.80	▲0.80
Total valid votes		8,856	98.75	
Total rejected ballots		112	1.25	
Unreturned ballots		0	0.00	
Turnout		8,968	77.72	▼4.41
Registered electors		11,539		
Majority		99	1.10	▼9.24
PBS hold		Swing		
Source(s) "KEPUTUSAN PILIHAN RAYA UMUM DEWAN UNDANGAN NEGERI SABAH BAGI TAHUN 1999".

Sabah state election, 1994
Party	Candidate	Votes	%	∆%
PBS	Ewon Ebin	4,956	54.56	▲3.94
BN	Kasitah Gaddam	4,017	44.22	▲18.29
Total valid votes		8,973	98.78	
Total rejected ballots		111	1.22	
Unreturned ballots		0	0.00	
Turnout		9,084	82.13	▲3.06
Registered electors		11,061		
Majority		939	10.34	▼14.35
PBS hold		Swing		
Source(s) "KEPUTUSAN PILIHAN RAYA UMUM DEWAN UNDANGAN NEGERI SABAH BAGI TAHUN 1994".

Sabah state election, 1990
Party	Candidate	Votes	%	∆%
PBS	Ewon Ebin	4,009	50.62	▲1.79
USNO	Masidi Manjun	2,054	25.93	▲18.51
PRS	Amari Ginggor @ Mynoor Ginggor	1,269	16.02	▲16.02
AKAR	Samat Dimok	212	2.68	▲2.68
BERJAYA	Japiril Suhaimin	193	2.44	▼38.35
Total valid votes		7,737	97.69	
Total rejected ballots		183	2.31	
Unreturned ballots		0	0.00	
Turnout		7,920	79.07	▲3.70
Registered electors		10,016		
Majority		1,955	24.69	▲16.89
PBS hold		Swing		
Source(s) "KEPUTUSAN PILIHAN RAYA UMUM DEWAN UNDANGAN NEGERI SABAH BAGI TAHUN 1990".

Sabah state election, 1986
Party	Candidate	Votes	%	∆%
PBS	Ewon Ebin	3,303	48.83	▲48.83
BERJAYA	Amari Ginggor @ Mynoor Ginggor	2,775	41.03	▼15.52
USNO	Maslin Juriman	502	7.42	▼35.38
Independent	Samin Hassan	90	1.33	▲0.68
Total valid votes		6,670	98.61	
Total rejected ballots		94	1.39	
Unreturned ballots		0	0.00	
Turnout		6,764	75.37	▼6.53
Registered electors		8,974		
Majority		528	7.80	▼5.95
PBS gain from BERJAYA		Swing		▼5.95
Source(s) "KEPUTUSAN PILIHAN RAYA UMUM DEWAN UNDANGAN NEGERI SABAH BAGI TAHUN 1986".

Sabah state election, 1981
Party	Candidate	Votes	%	∆%
BERJAYA	Mynoor Ginggor	2,422	56.55	▲4.49
USNO	Abdul Ghani Gilong	1,833	42.80	▼4.64
Independent	Stanislaus Puyushi B. L. Macery	28	0.65	▲0.65
Total valid votes		4,283	100.00	
Total rejected ballots		98		
Unreturned ballots		0		
Turnout		4,381	81.90	▼4.70
Registered electors		5,349		
Majority		589	13.75	▲9.13
BERJAYA gain from USNO		Swing		▲9.13

Sabah state election, 1976
Party	Candidate	Votes	%
BERJAYA	Mynoor Ginggor	1,861	52.06
USNO	Kasitah Gaddam	1,696	47.44
Independent	Francis Siam Maradan	18	0.50
Total valid votes		3,575	100.00
Total rejected ballots		77	
Unreturned ballots		0	
Turnout		3,652	86.60
Registered electors		4,217	
Majority		165	4.62
This was a new constituency created.
