= Paginatan =

Paginatan (N38)
Sabah constituency
- Coordinates: 5.79289°N 116.60451°E

State constituency
- Legislature: Sabah State Legislative Assembly
MLA
Rusdin Riman
KDM
- Constituency created: 1974
- First contested: 1974
- Last contested: 2025

Demographics
- Population (2020): 33,792
- Electors (2025): 26,881

Paginatan is a state constituency in Sabah, Malaysia, that is represented in the Sabah State Legislative Assembly.

During the Second World War, people from Paginatan assisted Australian prisoners of war by providing food.

== Demographics ==
As of 2020, Paginatan has a population of 33,792 people.

Ethnic breakdown of Paginatan's electorate as of 2025
1. Non-Muslim Bumiputera (63.3%)
2. Muslim Bumiputera (36.0%)
3. Chinese (0.70%)
4. Other ethnicities (0.00%)

== History ==
=== Polling districts ===
According to the gazette issued on 31 October 2022, the Paginatan constituency has a total of 22 polling districts.

State constituency	Polling Districts	Code	Location
Paginatan（N38）	Lohan	179/38/01	SK Lohan
Paginatan（N38）	Bongkud	179/38/02	SK Bongkud
Paginatan（N38）	Kilimu	179/38/03	SK Kilimu
Paginatan（N38）	Libang	179/38/04	SK Kampong Libang
Paginatan（N38）	Kituntul	179/38/05	SK Kituntul
Paginatan（N38）	Nalapak	179/38/06	SK Nalapak
Paginatan（N38）	Suminimpod	179/38/07	SK Kepangian
Paginatan（N38）	Longut	179/38/08	SK Longut
Paginatan（N38）	Paus	179/38/09	SK Paus
Paginatan（N38）	Paginatan	179/38/10	SK Paginatan
Paginatan（N38）	Kinapulidan	179/38/11	SK Kinapulidan
Paginatan（N38）	Tinanom	179/38/12	SK Tinanom
Paginatan（N38）	Tampios	179/38/13	SK Tampios
Paginatan（N38）	Miruru	179/38/14	SK Miruru
Paginatan（N38）	Tiang	179/38/15	SK Tiang
Paginatan（N38）	Noopung	179/38/16	SK Napong
Paginatan（N38）	Narawang	179/38/17	SK Narawang
Paginatan（N38）	Marakau	179/38/18	SK Marakau
Paginatan（N38）	Kandawayon	179/38/19	SK Kandawayon
Paginatan（N38）	Sagindai	179/38/20	SK Sagindai
Paginatan（N38）	Nampasan	179/38/21	SK Nampasan
Paginatan（N38）	Matupang	179/38/22	SMK Matupang Jaya

=== Representation history ===
Member of Sabah State Legislative Assembly for Paginatan
Assembly	No	Years	Member	Party
Constituency created from Ranau, Kundasang and Labuk
12th	N31	2004–2008	Ewon Ebin	BN (UPKO)
13th	N31	2008–2013	Ewon Ebin	BN (UPKO)
14th	N31	2013–2018	Siringan Gubat	BN (UPKO)
14th	N31	2018	Vacant (Note: Vacant from 20 March 2018 until the 2018 Malaysian general election due to the incumbent died in office.)	
15th	N31	2018	Abidin Madingkir	BN (UPKO)
15th	N31	2018–2020	Abidin Madingkir	UPKO
15th	N31	2020	Abidin Madingkir	Independent
16th	N38	2020–2025	Abidin Madingkir	GRS (STAR)
16th	N38	2025	Abidin Madingkir	STAR
17th	N38	2025–present	Rusdin Riman	KDM

== Election results ==
Sabah state election, 2025: Paginatan
Party	Candidate	Votes	%	∆%
KDM	Rusdin Riman	5,992	32.64	▲32.64
GRS	Abidin Madingkir	5,256	28.63	▲28.63
BN	Junaidi Sahat	2,448	13.34	▼9.22
Independent	Ivan Benedict	2,140	11.66	▲11.66
Homeland Solidarity Party	Feddrin Tuliang	1,709	9.31	▲9.31
Heritage	Juhaili Sidek	541	2.95	▲2.95
Sabah Native Co-operation Party	Rubica Gabayoi	92	0.50	▲0.50
PBM	Vennex Jasmin	78	0.42	▲0.42
Sabah Dream Party	Linus Yubod @ Md Haidi Md Badawi	55	0.30	▲0.30
Perjuangan Rakyat	Bensin Dani	46	0.25	▲0.25
Total valid votes		18,357		
Total rejected ballots		206		
Unreturned ballots		21		
Turnout		18,584	69.13	▼1.62
Registered electors		26,881		
Majority		736	4.01	▼8.13
KDM gain from PN		Swing		?
Source(s) "RESULTS OF CONTESTED ELECTION AND STATEMENTS OF THE POLL AFTER THE OFFICIAL ADDITION OF VOTES" (PDF).

Sabah state election, 2020: Paginatan
Party	Candidate	Votes	%	∆%
PN	Abidin Madingkir	3,783	34.70	▲34.70
BN	Junaidi Sahat	2,460	22.56	▼25.03
PBS	Arthur Sen Siong Choo	1,588	14.56	▲14.56
UPKO	Georgina George	1,245	11.42	▲11.42
Love Sabah Party	Amru Abdul Kadir	905	8.30	▲5.26
Sabah Native Co-operation Party	Henrynus Amin	349	3.20	▲3.20
LDP	Liong Sun Min	118	1.08	▲1.08
USNO (Baru)	Kamil Kasibun	112	1.03	▲1.03
GAGASAN	Bensin Dani	52	0.48	▲0.48
Total valid votes		10,612	97.33	
Total rejected ballots		244	2.24	
Unreturned ballots		47	0.43	
Turnout		10,903	70.75	▼14.18
Registered electors		15,410		
Majority		1,323	12.14	▼5.21
PN gain from BN		Swing		?
Source(s) "RESULTS OF CONTESTED ELECTION AND STATEMENTS OF THE POLL AFTER THE OFFICIAL ADDITION OF VOTES".

Sabah state election, 2018: Paginatan
Party	Candidate	Votes	%	∆%
BN	Abidin Madingkir	5,666	47.59	▼0.03
Sabah Heritage Party	Julian @ Paul Sidin	3,600	30.24	▲30.24
STAR	Feddrin Tuliang	1,870	15.71	▲5.61
Love Sabah Party	Satiol Indong	362	3.04	▲3.04
Sabah People's Unity Party	Mohd Jaili Samat	104	0.87	▲0.87
Total valid votes		11,602	97.99	
Total rejected ballots		234	1.97	
Unreturned ballots		69	0.58	
Turnout		11,905	84.93	▲3.59
Registered electors		15,325		
Majority		2,066	17.35	▲8.28
BN hold		Swing		
Source(s) "RESULTS OF CONTESTED ELECTION AND STATEMENTS OF THE POLL AFTER THE OFFICIAL ADDITION OF VOTES".

Sabah state election, 2013: Paginatan
Party	Candidate	Votes	%	∆%
BN	Siringan Gubat	5,142	47.62	▼22.98
PKR	Amru Abdul Kadir	4,163	38.55	▲14.83
STAR	Pedderin Tuliang @ Feddrin Tuling	1,139	10.55	▲10.55
Independent	Yazid Sahjinan	154	1.43	▲1.43
Total valid votes		10,598	98.15	
Total rejected ballots		174	1.61	
Unreturned ballots		26	0.24	
Turnout		10,798	81.34	▲8.21
Registered electors		13,275		
Majority		979	9.07	▼37.81
BN hold		Swing		
Source(s) "KEPUTUSAN PILIHAN RAYA UMUM DEWAN UNDANGAN NEGERI". Archived from the original on 2022-07-18.

Sabah state election, 2008: Paginatan
Party	Candidate	Votes	%	∆%
BN	Ewon Ebin	5,206	70.60	▲18.16
PKR	Paul Kerangkas	1,749	23.72	▲23.72
BERSEKUTU	Johumin Ampadong	157	21.29	▲21.29
Independent	Mohd Jaili Samat	90	1.22	▲1.22
Total valid votes		7,202	97.67	
Total rejected ballots		164	2.22	
Unreturned ballots		8	0.11	
Turnout		7,374	73.13	▲1.96
Registered electors		10,084		
Majority		3,457	46.88	▲21.65
BN hold		Swing		
Source(s) "KEPUTUSAN PILIHAN RAYA UMUM DEWAN UNDANGAN NEGERI SABAH BAGI TAHUN 2008".

Sabah state election, 2004: Paginatan
Party	Candidate	Votes	%
BN	Ewon Ebin	3,224	52.44
Independent	Janimin Saliun	1,673	27.21
Independent	Ramdi Indang	937	15.24
SETIA	Hendry Wan Kauting @ Wen	76	1.24
Independent	Nayon Gudumi	69	1.12
Total valid votes		5,979	97.25
Total rejected ballots		168	2.73
Unreturned ballots		1	0.02
Turnout		6,148	71.17
Registered electors		8,639	
Majority		1,551	25.23
This was a new constituency created.
Source(s) "KEPUTUSAN PILIHAN RAYA UMUM DEWAN UNDANGAN NEGERI SABAH BAGI TAHUN 2008".
