= Siringan Gubat =

Malaysian politician (1949–2018)

Yang Berbahagia Datuk Siringan Gubat PJN PGDK JSM KMN

Member of the Malaysian Parliament for Ranau, Sabah
- In office 2008–2013
- Preceded by: Bernard Dompok
- Succeeded by: Ewon Ebin

Personal details
- Born: Siringan bin Gubat; 28 November 1949 Ranau, Crown Colony of North Borneo
- Died: 20 March 2018 (aged 68) Kota Kinabalu, Sabah, Malaysia
- Citizenship: Malaysian
- Party: United Pasokmomogun Kadazandusun Murut Organisation
- Other political affiliations: Barisan Nasional
- Occupation: Politician

Siringan bin Gubat (28 November 1949 – 20 March 2018) was a Malaysian politician. He was the Minister for Resource Development and Information Technology in the state government of Sabah, and represented the seat of Paginatan in the Sabah State Legislative Assembly. From 2008 to 2013 he was the Member of the Parliament of Malaysia for the Ranau constituency. He was a member of the United Pasokmomogun Kadazandusun Murut Organisation (UPKO) party in the Barisan Nasional (BN) coalition.

Siringan was a member of the State Assembly between 1989 and 2004. He was first elected as a member of the United Sabah Party (PBS), but defected with Bernard Dompok in 1994 to join the Barisan Nasional coalition with a newly formed party that became UPKO.

He was elected to the federal Parliament in the 2008 election after the incumbent member, UPKO's President Bernard Dompok, shifted to the seat of Penampang. He served one term, before returning to the State Assembly at the 2013 Malaysian general election. After the election he was appointed as the Sabah Minister for Resource Development and Information Technology.

He died on 20 March 2018 at the age of 68. His remains are buried at Kampung Kinarasan, Ranau.

== Election results ==
Sabah State Legislative Assembly
Year	Constituency	Candidate	Votes	Pct	Opponent(s)	Votes	Pct	Ballots cast	Majority	Turnout
1989	N14 Ranau	Siringan Gubat (PBS)	3,647	57.26%	Mark Koding (AKAR)	2,517	39.52%	6,457	1,130	79.02%
1990	N14 Ranau	Siringan Gubat (PBS)	3,790	57%	Mark Koding (AKAR)	2,558	38%			
1994	N14 Ranau	Siringan Gubat (PBS)	4,615	56%	Mark Koding (BN)	3,593	44%			
1999	N26 Ranau	Siringan Gubat (PDS)	6,074	54%	Henrynus Amin (PBS)	4,847	43%			
2013	N31 Paginatan	Siringan Gubat (UPKO)	5,142	47%	Amru Abd Kadir (PKR)	4,163	38%			

Parliament of Malaysia
Year	constituency	Candidate	Votes	Pct	Opponent(s)	Votes	Pct	Ballots cast	Majority	Turnout
2008	P179 Ranau	Siringan Gubat (UPKO)	14,074	65.41%	Jonathan Yasin (PKR)	6,823	31.71%	22,201	7,251	72.06%
2008	P179 Ranau	Siringan Gubat (UPKO)	14,074	65.41%	Vitos Mark Koding (IND)	619	2.88%	22,201	7,251	72.06%

== Honours ==
=== Honours of Malaysia ===
- Malaysia
  - Commander of the Order of Meritorious Service (PJN) – Datuk (2017)
  - Companion of the Order of Loyalty to the Crown of Malaysia (JSM) (2007)
  - Officer of the Order of the Defender of the Realm (KMN) (2002)
- Sabah
  - Commander of the Order of Kinabalu (PGDK) – Datuk (1998)
