= Jonathan Yasin =

Malaysian politician

Yang Berhormat Datuk Jonathan Yasin PGDK ASDK MP

Deputy Minister of Home Affairs II
- In office 30 August 2021 – 24 November 2022 Serving with Ismail Mohamed Said (Deputy Minister of Home Affairs I)
- Monarch: Abdullah
- Prime Minister: Ismail Sabri Yaakob
- Minister: Hamzah Zainuddin
- Preceded by: Himself
- Succeeded by: Shamsul Anuar Nasarah (Deputy Minister of Home Affairs)
- Constituency: Ranau
- In office 10 March 2020 – 16 August 2021 Serving with Ismail Mohamed Said (Deputy Minister of Home Affairs I)
- Monarch: Abdullah
- Prime Minister: Muhyiddin Yassin
- Minister: Hamzah Zainuddin
- Preceded by: Azis Jamman (Deputy Minister of Home Affairs)
- Succeeded by: Himself
- Constituency: Ranau

Chairman of the Malaysian Cocoa Board
- In office 16 August 2018 – 10 March 2020
- Preceded by: Marcus Mojigoh
- Succeeded by: Anyi Ngau

Member of the Malaysian Parliament for Ranau
- Incumbent
- Assumed office 9 May 2018
- Preceded by: Ewon Ebin (BN–UPKO)
- Majority: 1,076 (2018); 11,092 (2022)

Faction represented in Dewan Rakyat
- 2018–2020: Pakatan Harapan
- 2020–2022: Perikatan Nasional
- 2022–: Gabungan Rakyat Sabah (as Direct member)

Personal details
- Born: Jonathan bin Yasin; 19 October 1967 (age 58) Sabah, Malaysia
- Citizenship: Malaysian
- Party: People's Justice Party (PKR) (2008–2020); Malaysian United Indigenous Party (BERSATU) (2020–2022); Direct member of Gabungan Rakyat Sabah (GRS) (since 2022)
- Other political affiliations: Pakatan Rakyat (PR) (2008–2015); Pakatan Harapan (PH) (2015–2020); Perikatan Nasional (PN) (2020–2022); Gabungan Rakyat Sabah (GRS) (since 2020)
- Spouse: Helena Masry
- Occupation: Politician

Yang Berhormat Datuk Jonathan bin Yasin (born 19 October 1967) is a Malaysian politician who has served as the Member of Parliament (MP) for Ranau since May 2018. He served as the Deputy Minister of Home Affairs II for the second term in the Barisan Nasional (BN) administration under former Prime Minister Ismail Sabri Yaakob and former Minister Hamzah Zainuddin from August 2021 to the collapse of the BN administration in November 2022 and the first term in Perikatan Nasional (PN) administration under former Prime Minister Muhyiddin Yassin and former Minister Hamzah from March 2020 to the collapse of the PN administration in August 2021. He is a direct member of the Gabungan Rakyat Sabah (GRS) coalition. He joined the Malaysian United Indigenous Party (BERSATU), a component party of the PN coalition after resigning from the People's Justice Party (PKR), a component party of the Pakatan Harapan (PH) coalition. He later resigned from BERSATU but remained in GRS as direct member.

== Political career ==
=== 2008 general election ===
In the 2008 election, Jonathan under his party of People's Justice Party (PKR) faced Siringan Gubat of the United Pasokmomogun Kadazandusun Murut Organisation (UPKO) and lost in a large majority.

=== 2013 general election ===
In the 2013 election, Jonathan faced a new candidate Ewon Ebin of UPKO but losing again the parliamentary seat.

=== 2018 general election ===
In the 2018 election, his party of PKR field him to contest the Ranau parliamentary seat again, facing the seat defending candidate Ewon Ebin from UPKO and subsequently won.

== Incident ==
In 2013, Jonathan as a PKR member post a picture of Anwar Ibrahim being awarded the "Huguan Siou" (Paramount Leader of the Kadazan-Dusuns) in his Facebook account. This subsequently leading to furore among Kadazan-Dusun community in Sabah as the title is "sacred" and should only be used among the ethnic indigenous community, not for a country title. The Kadazandusun Cultural Association (KDCA) also demanded apologies from him and Anwar. Responding to the criticism, Jonathan said "Who am I to stop any Kadazan-Dusun individual from enthroning any person as 'Huguan Siou' Malaysia?". Anwar however denied that he was bestowed the honour.

== Election results ==
Parliament of Malaysia
Year	Constituency	Candidate	Votes	Pct	Opponent(s)	Votes	Pct	Ballots Cast	Majority	Turnout
2008	P179 Ranau	Jonathan Yasin (PKR)	6,823	31.71%	Siringan Gubat (UPKO)	14,074	65.41%	22,201	7,251	72.06%
2008	P179 Ranau	Jonathan Yasin (PKR)	6,823	31.71%	Vitos Mark Koding (IND)	619	2.88%	22,201	7,251	72.06%
2013	P179 Ranau	Jonathan Yasin (PKR)	11,823	38.47%	Ewon Ebin (UPKO)	15,434	50.22%	31,458	3,611	80.55%
2013	P179 Ranau	Jonathan Yasin (PKR)	11,823	38.47%	Julianah Situn (STAR)	2,559	8.33%	31,458	3,611	80.55%
2013	P179 Ranau	Jonathan Yasin (PKR)	11,823	38.47%	Yazid Sahjinan (IND)	914	2.97%	31,458	3,611	80.55%
2018	P179 Ranau	Jonathan Yasin (PKR)	14,880	45.17%	Ewon Ebin (UPKO)	13,804	31.6%	33,904	1,076	77.57%
2018	P179 Ranau	Jonathan Yasin (PKR)	14,880	45.17%	Soudi Andang (STAR)	3,148	9.56%	33,904	1,076	77.57%
2018	P179 Ranau	Jonathan Yasin (PKR)	14,880	45.17%	Andau Yasun (PCS)	1,110	3.37%	33,904	1,076	77.57%
2022	P179 Ranau	Jonathan Yasin (BERSATU Sabah)	22,606	53.44%	Taufik Dahlan (PKR)	11,514	27.22%	42,811	11,092	63.59%
2022	P179 Ranau	Jonathan Yasin (BERSATU Sabah)	22,606	53.44%	Ewon Ebin (PBRS)	4,254	10.06%	42,811	11,092	63.59%
2022	P179 Ranau	Jonathan Yasin (BERSATU Sabah)	22,606	53.44%	Markos Siton (WARISAN)	2,657	6.28%	42,811	11,092	63.59%
2022	P179 Ranau	Jonathan Yasin (BERSATU Sabah)	22,606	53.44%	Azizul Julirin (PEJUANG)	1,267	3.00%	42,811	11,092	63.59%

== Honours ==
=== Honours of Malaysia ===
- Malaysia
  - Recipient of the 17th Yang di-Pertuan Agong Installation Medal
- Sabah
  - Companion of the Order of Kinabalu (ASDK) (2018)
  - Commander of the Order of Kinabalu (PGDK) – Datuk (2021)
