= 1994 Sabah state election =

State election in Sabah, Malaysia

- 18–19 February 1994

All 48 seats in the Sabah State Legislative Assembly 25 seats needed for a majority
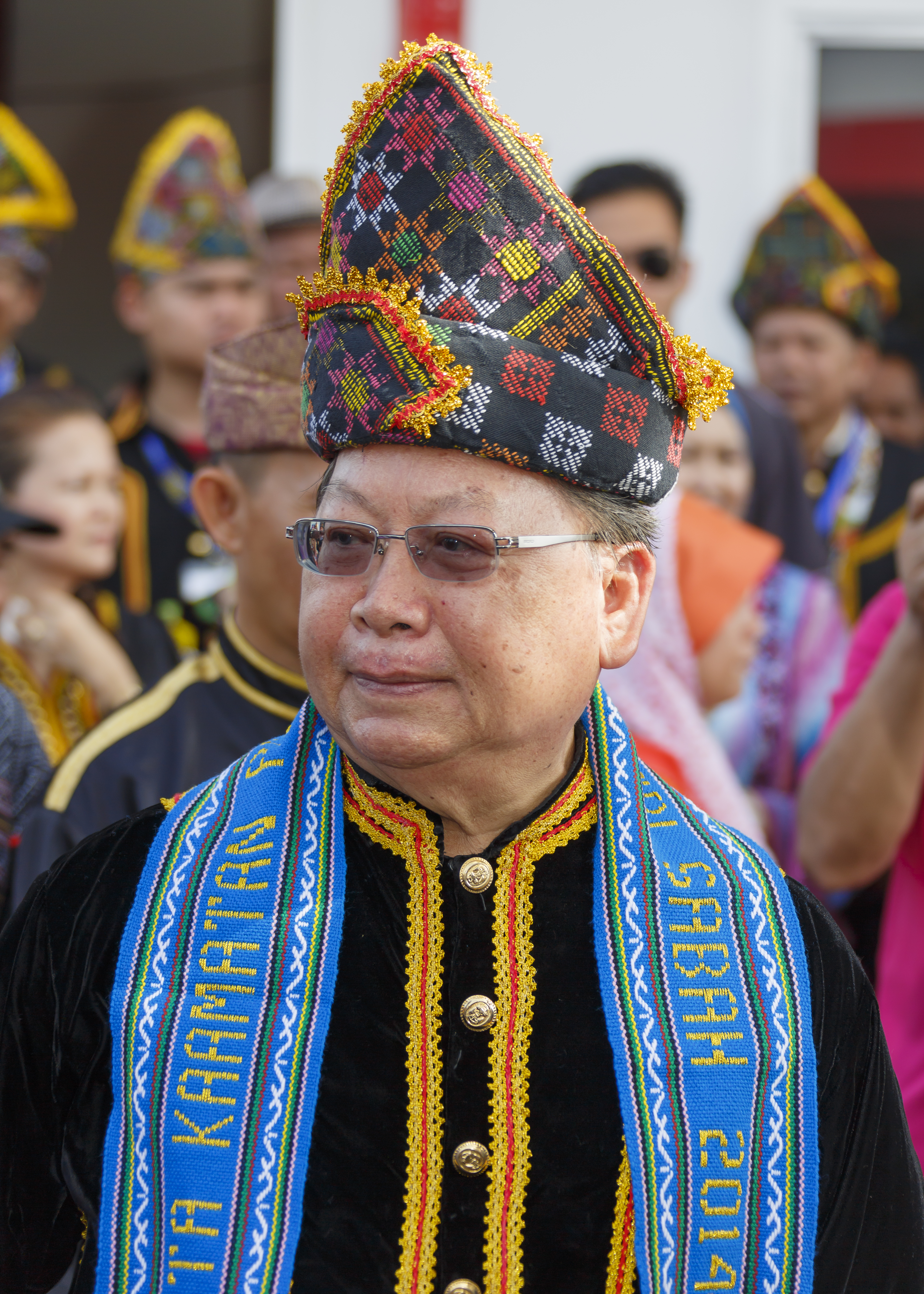

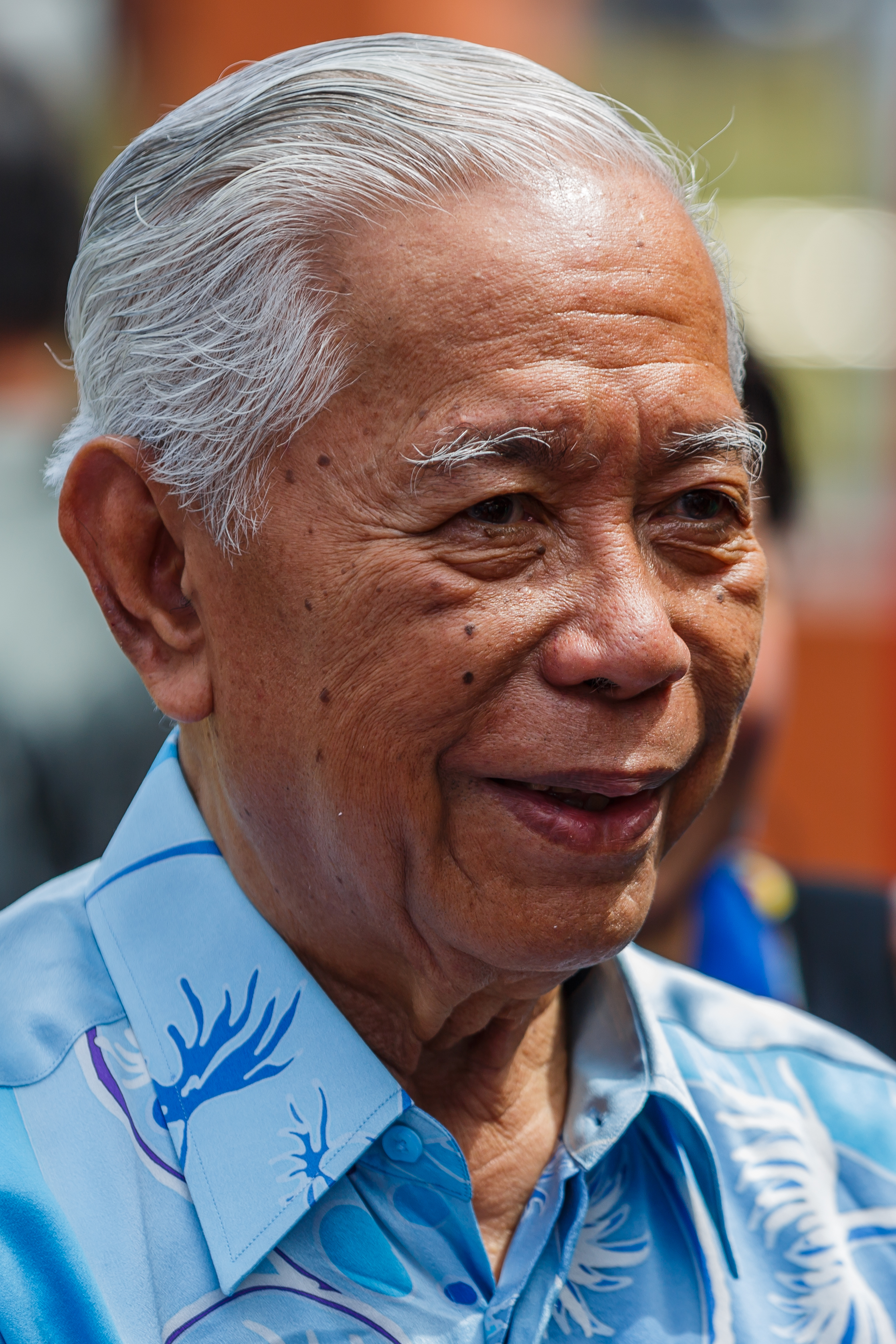
	Majority party	Minority party
Leader	Joseph Pairin Kitingan	Sakaran Dandai
Party	PBS	UMNO
Alliance	Gagasan Rakyat	Barisan Nasional
Leader since	1985	1993
Leader's seat	Tambunan	Sulabayan
Last election	34 seats	New party
Seats won	25	23
Seat change	▼9	▲23
Chief Minister before election
Joseph Pairin Kitingan
GR-PBS
Elected Chief Minister
Joseph Pairin Kitingan
GR-PBS

The 1994 Sabah state election was held between Friday, 18 February and Saturday, 19 February 1994. Nomination day was 7 February 1994. The election was one of the most controversial election in Sabah's political history. The election was won by the incumbent ruling party (although the opposition at federal level) Parti Bersatu Sabah (PBS), winning 25 seats against 23 won by the federal government's ruling Barisan Nasional coalition.

== Background ==
The Assembly were dissolved by Yang di-Pertua Negeri of Sabah Said Keruak on advice from Chief Minister Joseph Pairin Kitingan on 9 January 1994, 16 months before the Assembly term of 5 years expire, paving the way to a snap election.

PBS has ruled Sabah for almost 9 years since winning the 1985 Sabah state election, winning 3 state elections including 1985, and also were in Barisan Nasional from 1986 until exiting the BN in 1990 and joined opposition pact Gagasan Rakyat with DAP.

== Contesting parties ==
Before the election, PBS had already produced 2 splinters, SAPP (which were only formed 3 weeks before on 21 January, and contesting for the first time) and AKAR (formed in 1989, and have contested in 1990 state and federal elections), both which had contested under BN banner. LDP would also contest under BN.

This was the first Sabah state election to feature peninsula-based party United Malays National Organisation (UMNO). UMNO Sabah was born of the merger between United Sabah National Organisation (USNO) and Sabah People's United Front (BERJAYA) in 1991, as a party to counter PBS influence in Sabah.

Other parties contesting included SETIA, BERSEKUTU, DAP (a partner of PBS in Gagasan Rakyat but is contesting in 2 seats against PBS), PAS and independent candidates. SETIA however, through its president Suhaidin Langkap on the eve of the election announced all 14 of its candidates withdrawal from contesting and changing their support for BN, although the candidates name were still on the ballot list.

== Candidates ==
No.	State Constituency	Incumbent Member	Political coalitions and respective candidates and coalitions											
No.	State Constituency	Incumbent Member	United Sabah Party (PBS)		Barisan Nasional (BN)		SETIA		Others					
No.	State Constituency	Incumbent Member	Candidate name	Party	Candidate name	Party	Candidate name	Party	Candidate name	Party	Candidate name	Party	Candidate name	Party
N01	Banggi	Amir Kahar Mustapha	Amir Kahar Mustapha	USNO	Abd Mijul Unaini	UMNO	Saraban Lahaman	SETIA	Abidula Amsana	IND	Napson Tahir	BERSEKUTU		
N02	Kudat	Wong Phin Chung	Wong Phin Chung	PBS	Kong Hong Ming	LDP	Chin Ket Phin	SETIA	Taulani Jalaluddin	IND	Mohd Hairul Ebuk	BERSEKUTU		
N03	Bengkoka	Paul Tom Imbayan	Paul Tom Imbayan	PBS	Masrani Parman	UMNO								
N04	Matunggong	Mathius Majihi	Markus Majihi	PBS	Jelani Hamdan	UMNO			Henry Madatang	IND	Apin Santi	IND		
N05	Tandek	Saibul Supu	Saibul Supu	PBS	Saidi Suari	UMNO								
N06	Langkon	Bugie Galadam	Maximus Ongkili	PBS	Newman Gaban	UMNO			Linggu Lincoln Luwing	IND				
N07	Tempasuk	Robert Ripin Minggir	Dausin Pangalin	PBS	Pandikar Amin Mulia	AKAR			Suwah Buleh	IND				
N08	Usukan	Mustapha Harun	Badaruddin Mustapha	PBS	Salleh Said Keruak	UMNO	Semat Abdul Karim	SETIA	Salisi Ukoh	IND				
N09	Kadamaian	Banggai Basirun	Banggai Basirun	PBS	Awadnir Matanggal	UMNO			Handry Rumpit	IND	Meisen Sendelun	IND	Sindeh Teliban	IND
N10	Tamparuli	Wilfred Bumburing	Wilfred Bumburing	PBS	Raji Mandaili	AKAR			Junaidi Hamdan	IND				
N11	Sulaman	Hajiji Noor	Matbeh Ismail	PBS	Hajiji Noor	UMNO	Margaret Fararena Mohd. Kimon	SETIA	Pengiran Othman Rauf	IND				
N12	Kiulu	Gisin Lombut	Gisin Lombut	PBS	Sulah Rampas	AKAR								
N13	Kundasang	Ewon Ebin	Ewon Ebin	PBS	Kasitah Gaddam	UMNO								
N14	Ranau	Siringan Gubat	Siringan Gubat	PBS	Mark Koding	AKAR								
N15	Sugut	Jublee Zen	Jublee Zen	PBS	Surady Kayong	UMNO								
N16	Labuk	Tan Yung Hi @ Tan Yong Gee	Tan Yung Hi @ Tan Yong Gee	PBS	Ahmad Thamrin Mohd Jaini	UMNO			Denis Tweening Rantau	IND				
N17	Sungai Sibuga	Thien Fui Yun	Thien Fui Yun	PBS	Musa Aman	UMNO	Satiman Tauran	SETIA	Hamid Jan	BERSEKUTU				
N18	Elopura	Tham Nyip Shen	Edmund Chong Ket Fah	PBS	Tham Nyip Shen	SAPP			Ang Lian Hai	DAP				
N19	Tanjong Papat	Tan Kit Sher	Lai Lun Tzee	PBS	Raymond Tan Shu Kiah	SAPP			Fung Ket Wing	DAP				
N20	Karamunting	Lau Pui Keong	Lau Pui Keong	PBS	Ng Ket Henn	SAPP								
N21	Sekong	Pitting Mohd Ali	Pitting Mohd Ali	USNO	Nahalan Damsal	UMNO								
N22	Sukau	Aklee Abass	Zaki Gusmiah	PBS	Aklee Abass	UMNO	Ali Ayau	SETIA						
N23	Kuamut	Joseph Sitin Saang	Joseph Sitin Saang	PBS	Bung Moktar Radin	UMNO			Ali Latip Taha	IND				
N24	Tambunan	Joseph Pairin Kitingan	Joseph Pairin Kitingan	PBS	Martin Yong	AKAR			Jouti Ajun	IND				
N25	Bingkor	Lawrence Gimbang	Jeffrey Kitingan	PBS	Injon Reynold Sedomon	AKAR			Ayub Aman	IND				
N26	Moyog	Bernard Giluk Dompok	Bernard Giluk Dompok	PBS	Edwin Richard	AKAR	Inus Molukon	SETIA	Clarence Dicsenol Bongkos Malakun	IND	Loh Chien Cheng	IND		
N27	Inanam	Stephen Kinson Kutai @ Joni Bilingan	Stephen Kinson Kutai @ Joni Bilingan	PBS	Wong Kau Chai Sindin	SAPP	Salim Adim	SETIA						
N28	Likas	Yong Teck Lee	Yee Moh Chai	PBS	Yong Teck Lee	SAPP								
N29	Api-Api	Chau Tet On	Chau Tet On	PBS	Terence Chong Nyim Fatt	SAPP								
N30	Sembulan	Peter Chong On Tet	Chau Chin Tang	PBS	Chong Eng Leong	LDP	John Chin Fook Faat	SETIA	Thien Yun Fah	IND				
N31	Petagas	James Ligunjang	James Ligunjang	PBS	Yahya Hussin	UMNO			James Andrew Vitales	IND				
N32	Kawang	Ariah Tengku Ahmad	Ariah Tengku Ahmad	PBS	Osu Sukam	UMNO			Norbert Chin Chuan Siong	IND	John Dagul	IND	Durig Sumpang	IND
N33	Buang Sayang	Cladius Sundang Alex	Cladius Sundang Alex	PBS	Abdul Rahim Ismail	UMNO	Juali Ahmad	SETIA						
N34	Bongawan	Karim Bujang	Narawi Ahmad	PBS	Karim Bujang	UMNO			Ajmain Abdul Gani	IND				
N35	Kuala Penyu	Wences Anggang	Wences Anggang	PBS	Mohd Zahari Zinin	UMNO			Ismail Salleh	IND				
N36	Klias	Lajim Ukin	Lajim Ukin	PBS	Anifah Aman	UMNO								
N37	Lumadan	Dayang Mahani Pengiran Ahmad Raffae	Sadih Nasah	PBS	Dayang Mahani Pengiran Ahmad Raffae	UMNO								
N38	Sipitang	Jamilah Sulaiman	Jamilah Sulaiman	PBS	Sapawi Amat Wasali	UMNO								
N39	Tenom	Kadoh Agundong	Kadoh Agundong	PBS	Wong Yit Ming	LDP	Lawrence Hassim Riki	SETIA	Limun Laikim	IND	Jinuin Jimin	IND		
N40	Kemabong	Esar Andamas	Rubin Balang	PBS	Bobbey Ah Fang Suan	UMNO	Lim Antuka	SETIA						
N41	Sook	Joseph Kurup	Joseph Kurup	PBS	Taimin Lumaing	UMNO								
N42	Nabawan	Adut Sigoh @ Joe Said Besar	Adut Sigoh @ Joe Said Besar	PBS	Ahuar Rasam	UMNO								
N43	Merotai	Mohd Said Senang	Mohd Said Senang	USNO	Abdul Ghapur Salleh	UMNO	Hamud Salleh	SETIA	Mohamad Tingka	PAS				
N44	Sri Tanjong	Michael Lim Sun Yang	Michael Lim Sun Yang	PBS	Geoffrey Yee Lung Fook	SAPP			Armanus Arshad	PAS				
N45	Lahad Datu	Askalanai Abdul Rahim	Askalanai Abdul Rahim	USNO	Mohamad Yusof Amat Jamlee	UMNO			Benjamin Usman	BERSEKUTU	Ismail OT Ator	IND		
N46	Kunak	Salim Bachu	Salim Bachu	USNO	Unding Lana	UMNO			Sarip Wahirun	BERSEKUTU	Nilwan Kabang	IND		
N47	Balung	Ismail Jook	Sari Suhut	PBS	Abdul Mannan Jakasa	UMNO	Lung Wing Sang	SETIA	Ahmad Awang	PAS	Ismail Juma	IND		
N48	Sulabayan	Nasir Sakaran	Abdillah Abdul Hamid	PBS	Sakaran Dandai	UMNO			Abdul Rajin Mandul Hati	BERSEKUTU	Kiling OT Tiring	IND		

== Results ==
Party or alliance		Votes	%	Seats	+/–
United Sabah Party (PBS)		215,952	49.67	25	–9
Barisan Nasional (BN)	United Malays National Organisation (UMNO)	137,749	31.68	18	New
Barisan Nasional (BN)	Sabah Progressive Party (SAPP)	36,986	8.51	3	New
Barisan Nasional (BN)	Liberal Democratic Party (LDP)	11,555	2.66	1	+1
Barisan Nasional (BN)	People's Justice Front (AKAR)	15,084	3.47	1	+1
Barisan Nasional (BN)	Total	201,374	46.31	23	+23
United Democratic Sabah People's Power Party (SETIA)		846	0.19	0	New
Federated Sabah People's Front (BERSEKUTU)		1,121	0.26	0	New
Pan-Malaysian Islamic Party (PAS)		440	0.10	0	New
Democratic Action Party (DAP)		2,153	0.50	0	0
Independents		12,912	2.97	0	0
Total		434,798	100.00	48	0
Valid votes		434,798	98.34		
Invalid/blank votes		7,341	1.66		
Total votes		442,139	100.00		
Registered voters/turnout		598,305	73.90		

== Aftermath ==
As per stated above, PBS won the election by a tight margin. PBS president Joseph Pairin Kitingan was sworn in as chief minister of Sabah, his fourth time, on 21 February 1994, together with the state EXCO members. However, less than a month later, as a result of defections by elected PBS assemblymen to BN, Pairin was forced to resign on 17 March 1994, and PBS was forced out of power, resulting in BN forming government in Sabah. Sakaran Dandai, leader of UMNO and BN in Sabah, was sworn in as the new Chief Minister on the same day.

Bernard Dompok, the former PBS vice-president, formed Parti Demokratik Sabah (PDS) with 18 assemblymen (PDS later changed name to UPKO). Joseph Kurup left PBS and formed Parti Bersatu Rakyat Sabah (PBRS). Jeffery Kitingan, Pairin's brother, also left PBS and joined Angkatan Keadilan Rakyat (AKAR). All of these parties stated their support to BN, and later joined BN. As a result of these defections, PBS was left with 5 seats.

The outcome of this election and the defections resulted in the term katak being coined in, the literal meaning of which is "frog", due to the actions of PBS members "jumping" to another political party.

=== CM rotation system ===
After BN regains power in Sabah, it introduced Chief Minister rotation system between Muslim bumiputera, Non-Muslim bumiputera, and Chinese leaders for two year tenure each. This was one of the promises of BN during the election campaign. Sakaran only become CM for less than one year before resigning and accepting the Yang di-Pertua Negeri Sabah role on 1 January 1995; Salleh Said Keruak replaced him. Yong Teck Lee of SAPP then becomes CM from 1996 to 1998, before Bernard Dompok took the CM role from 1998 to 1999, when the Sabah Assembly was dissolved to make way for the state election on February that year.

== See also ==
- 2009 Perak constitutional crisis
