= Ewon Ebin =

Malaysian politician

Yang Berbahagia Datuk Ewon Ebin PGDK JMN

Minister of Science, Technology and Innovation
- In office 16 May 2013 – 29 July 2015
- Monarch: Abdul Halim
- Prime Minister: Najib Razak
- Deputy: Abu Bakar Mohamad Diah
- Preceded by: Maximus Ongkili
- Succeeded by: Wilfred Madius Tangau
- Constituency: Ranau

Member of the Malaysian Parliament for Ranau, Sabah
- In office 5 May 2013 – 9 May 2018
- Preceded by: Siringan Gubat (UPKO–BN)
- Succeeded by: Jonathan Yasin (PKR–PH)
- Majority: 3,611 (2013)

Personal details
- Born: 26 June 1954 (age 71) Ranau, Crown Colony of North Borneo (now Sabah, Malaysia)
- Citizenship: Malaysian
- Party: Parti Bersatu Sabah (PBS) (1985–1994); United Progressive Kinabalu Organisation (UPKO) (1994–2020); Parti Gagasan Rakyat Sabah (GAGASAN) (2020); Parti Cinta Sabah (PCS) (2020–2021); Parti Bersatu Rakyat Sabah (PBRS) (since 2022)
- Other political affiliations: Barisan Nasional (BN) (1985–2018, since 2022)
- Spouse: Danna Obidan Untol (died 2023)
- Relations: Kalakau Untol (brother-in-law); Masiung Banah (son-in-law)
- Occupation: Politician
- Profession: Lawyer

Ewon Ebin (born 26 June 1954) is a Malaysian politician who served as the Minister of Science, Technology, and Innovation and represented Ranau as the Member of Parliament of Malaysia from 2013 to 2018.

He is the former Vice President and one of the co-founders of the United Progressive Kinabalu Organisation (UPKO), a political party in the state of Sabah. He left UPKO in February 2020, citing that the party leadership had derailed from its original objectives and failed to protect the welfare of its members, the indigenous Sabahans and other Malaysians from Sabah. His resignation leads 5,000 UPKO members to quit the party, including committee members from the Ranau division.

In March 2020, Datuk Ewon Ebin declared that he will be joining Parti Cinta Sabah (PCS) under the leadership of former federal minister Tan Sri Datuk Seri Panglima Anifah Aman.

He is very interested in the problems of natives in Sabah. His thesis at the University of Malaya 1978 was 'A Ranau Dusun Traditional Law Study in Sabah on Marriage, Divorce and Heritage' was one of his contribution.

== Personal life ==
Ewon was born and raised in Bundu Tuhan, located within the nearest township of Kundasang in the frontier of Ranau district, which was also a village located at the foot of the tallest mountain in South East Asia, Mount Kinabalu. He is married to the late Datin Danna Obidan Untol (14 November 1956 – 9 September 2023) a Dusun Lotud woman from Tuaran and the couple are blessed with six children and has a Bachelor of Legislative Law (LLB) conferred by the University of Malaya. After graduating, he became a lawyer and opened a law firm known as Tetuan Vitales Ewon & Co, in Kota Kinabalu. In 1979, Ewon was appointed as a First Class Magistrate after being admitted into the Sabah Bar, which he served for more than five years.

== Government career ==
Ewon held several government positions, prior to and whilst being actively involved in politics. Between 1986 and 2002, he served in different state government GLCs, namely as the Chairman of Sabah Rubber Fund Board, Chairman of Permodalan Bumiputra Sabah, Director of Sabah Bank and Deputy Chairman of the Sabah Economic Development Corporation (SEDCO).

== Political career ==
=== Member of the Sabah State Legislative Assembly ===
Ewon's political career began to shine when he was at the age of 31, whilst still doing his legal practice as a young lawyer. He won the Sabah State Legislative Assembly for the N.13 Kundasang seat in 1985 under Parti Bersatu Sabah (PBS), which he held the position for almost 15 years.

From 2004 to 2013, he became the first member of the Sabah State Legislative Assembly for the newly created N.31 Paginatan seat through United Progressive Kinabalu Organisation political party ticket. UPKO is another political party in Sabah, which he founded together with Tan Sri Bernard Dompok and other former leaders who defected from Parti Bersatu Sabah as a result of the 1994 state elections.

During his time as a Member of the Sabah State Legislative Assembly, Ewon has held various positions in Sabah State Government in several ministerial portfolios, mostly as an Assistant Minister, namely:

- Assistant Minister of Tourism and Environment (1986–1994) under the Chief Ministership of Joseph Pairin Kitingan (2nd and 3rd terms)
- Assistant Minister of Industrial Development and Trade (March 1994) during the Chief Ministership of Joseph Pairin Kitingan (4th term, albeit briefly for a week or a few days);
- Assistant Minister of Local Government and Housing (1999–2002) under the Chief Ministerships of Osu Sukam and Chong Kah Kiat.

Two years later in 2004 (after resigning personally as an state Assistant Minister as well as chair of several state government GLCs and some statutory boards in order to be a full-time backbencher MLA), Ewon was appointed by the then-Chief Minister of Sabah, Musa Aman as full Minister of Industrial Development and Trade (which also marked his return into this said ministry after having served as a state Assistant Minister in this portfolio in March 1994, during his fourth term as a state assemblyman), for he was already an MLA for more than five terms and was already in his sixth term overall as a state assemblyman.

After serving the position for a term in 2008, he was assigned to another portfolio as the Minister of Rural Development until the 2013 General Elections.

=== Federal parliamentarian ===
In the 2013 general election, Ewon was elected to the federal Parliament for the seat of P.179 Ranau in the state of Sabah. During his first term in parliament, he was selected to become one of Prime Minister Najib Razak's cabinet minister in his pre-reshuffled Second Najib cabinet. He served as the Minister of Science, Technology, and Innovation of Malaysia for two years from 2013 to 2015.

=== Parti Cinta Sabah (PCS) ===
On 17 December 2021, he resigned as Vice-President and member of PCS along with many of its leaders, resulting in mass resignations. He stated that the party was disorganised and inactive.

== Issues ==
=== Illegal immigrants issues ===
On 11 January 2009, in his capacity as Sabah Rural Development Minister, Ewon reminded the JKKK about the tactics of illegal immigrants using a fake identity card to steal the aid of the native hardcore poor. Through home visits, the relevant parties can check the actual level of the applicant's poverty thus ensuring that their documents are valid or otherwise.

=== Rural aid ===
On 30 April 2010, Ewon as Sabah Rural Development Minister was present at the Sabah Sejahtera Award at Kampung Mansiang Community Development Center, Menggatal. Also present were Assistant Minister of Resources Development and Information Technology Development, Jainab Ahmad and Permanent Secretary of the Ministry of Rural Development, Ghulam Jelani. The winner is Kampung Tanjung Bulat, Kinabatangan - the state-level Sabah Sejahtera Award winner. Entilibon Village, Tongod (runner up) and Kampung Babagon Penampang (third). All winners receive prizes in the form of a project grant of RM50,000 for the champion, RM40,000 (runner-up) and RM30,000 (third).

== Elections ==
Since 1985, Ewon has been contesting in the Sabah election in Kundasang. In 1985 Ewon won with a majority of 939 votes. In the 1999 elections, Ewon was opposed by Ramdi Indang (BERSEKUTU); Karim Bin Adam (PBS) and Benjimin Yasin (Setia). Kundasang's jurisdiction had 11,539 votes.

The previous State Assembly is known as Ranau and has 8639 voters.

In the next election in 2004, Ewon (PBS) received 4956 votes; Kasitah Gaddam (BN) gets 4,017 votes.

In the 2008 election, Ewon (BN) received 5206 votes; Jahumin Ampadong (BERSEKUTU) 157; Paul Kerangkas (PKR) 1,749 votes and Mat Jaili Samat (Independent) 90 votes. After the victory, he was appointed Sabah's Minister of Rural Development.

== Election results ==
Sabah State Legislative Assembly
Year	Constituency	Candidate	Votes	Pct	Opponent(s)	Votes	Pct	Ballots cast	Majority	Turnout
1985	N13 Kundasang, P156 Kinabalu	Ewon Ebin (PBS)	2,372	39.07%	Abdul Rahman Kimbayu (USNO)	1,968	32.42%	6,071	404	75.37%
1985	N13 Kundasang, P156 Kinabalu	Ewon Ebin (PBS)	2,372	39.07%	Amari Ginggor @ Mynoor (BERJAYA)	1,450	23.88%	6,071	404	75.37%
1985	N13 Kundasang, P156 Kinabalu	Ewon Ebin (PBS)	2,372	39.07%	Sutiri Ganggang @ Jaffren Danggal	98	1.61%	6,071	404	75.37%
1986	N13 Kundasang, P156 Kinabalu	Ewon Ebin (PBS)	3,303	48.83%	Amari Ginggor @ Mynoor (BERJAYA)	2,775	41.03%	6,764	528	75.37%
1986	N13 Kundasang, P156 Kinabalu	Ewon Ebin (PBS)	3,303	48.83%	Masilin Juriman (USNO)	502	7.42%	6,764	528	75.37%
1986	N13 Kundasang, P156 Kinabalu	Ewon Ebin (PBS)	3,303	48.83%	Samin Hassan (IND)	90	1.33%	6,764	528	75.37%
1990	N13 Kundasang, P156 Kinabalu	Ewon Ebin (PBS)	4,009	50.62%	Masidi Manjun (USNO)	2,054	25.93%	7,737	1,955	79.07%
1990	N13 Kundasang, P156 Kinabalu	Ewon Ebin (PBS)	4,009	50.62%	Amari Ginggor @ Mynoor (PRS)	1,269	16.02%	7,737	1,955	79.07%
1990	N13 Kundasang, P156 Kinabalu	Ewon Ebin (PBS)	4,009	50.62%	Samat Dimok (AKAR)	212	2.68%	7,737	1,955	79.07%
1990	N13 Kundasang, P156 Kinabalu	Ewon Ebin (PBS)	4,009	50.62%	Japiril Suhaimin (BERJAYA)	193	2.44%	7,737	1,955	79.07%
1994	N13 Kundasang, P156 Kinabalu	Ewon Ebin (PBS)	4,956	54.56%	Kasitah Gaddam (UMNO)	4,017	44.22%	8,973	939	82.13%
1999	N25 Kundasang, P156 Kinabalu	Ewon Ebin (PDS)	4,102	45.74%	Karim Adam (PBS)	4,201	46.84%	8,856	99	77.72%
1999	N25 Kundasang, P156 Kinabalu	Ewon Ebin (PDS)	4,102	45.74%	Ramdi Indang (BERSEKUTU)	481	5.36%	8,856	99	77.72%
1999	N25 Kundasang, P156 Kinabalu	Ewon Ebin (PDS)	4,102	45.74%	Benjamin Yasin (SETIA)	72	0.80%	8,856	99	77.72%
2008	N31 Paginatan, P179 Ranau	Ewon Ebin (UPKO)	5,206	70.60%	Paul Kerangkas (PKR)	1,749	23.72%	7,202	3,457	73.17%
2008	N31 Paginatan, P179 Ranau	Ewon Ebin (UPKO)	5,206	70.60%	Johumin Ampadong (BERSEKUTU)	157	21.29%	7,202	3,457	73.17%
2008	N31 Paginatan, P179 Ranau	Ewon Ebin (UPKO)	5,206	70.60%	Mat Jaili Samat (IND)	90	1.22%	7,202	3,457	73.17%
2020	N36 Kundasang, P179 Ranau	Ewon Ebin (PCS)	2,384	23.33%	Joachim Gunsalam (PBS)	4,332	42.39%	9,994	1,422	68.20%
2020	N36 Kundasang, P179 Ranau	Ewon Ebin (PCS)	2,384	23.33%	Siriman Basir (WARISAN)	2,910	28.47%	9,994	1,422	68.20%
2020	N36 Kundasang, P179 Ranau	Ewon Ebin (PCS)	2,384	23.33%	Jeafry Goh Kautah (LDP)	293	2.87%	9,994	1,422	68.20%
2020	N36 Kundasang, P179 Ranau	Ewon Ebin (PCS)	2,384	23.33%	Osman Marajin (PGRS)	75	0.73%	9,994	1,422	68.20%

Parliament of Malaysia
Year	Constituency	Candidate	Votes	Pct	Opponent(s)	Votes	Pct	Ballots cast	Majority	Turnout
2013	P179 Ranau	Ewon Ebin (UPKO)	15,434	50.22%	Jonathan Yasin (PKR)	11,823	38.47%	31,458	3,611	80.55%
2013	P179 Ranau	Ewon Ebin (UPKO)	15,434	50.22%	Julianah Situn (STAR)	2,559	8.33%	31,458	3,611	80.55%
2013	P179 Ranau	Ewon Ebin (UPKO)	15,434	50.22%	Yazid Sahjinan (IND)	914	2.97%	31,458	3,611	80.55%
2018	P179 Ranau	Ewon Ebin (UPKO)	13,804	41.90%	Jonathan Yasin (PKR)	14,880	45.17%	33,904	1,076	77.57%
2018	P179 Ranau	Ewon Ebin (UPKO)	13,804	41.90%	Soudi Andang (STAR)	3,148	9.56%	33,904	1,076	77.57%
2018	P179 Ranau	Ewon Ebin (UPKO)	13,804	41.90%	Bruno Andau Yasun (PCS)	1,110	3.37%	33,904	1,076	77.57%
2022	P179 Ranau	Ewon Ebin (PBRS)	4,254	10.06%	Jonathan Yasin (BERSATU Sabah)	22,606	53.44%	42,811	11,092	63.59%
2022	P179 Ranau	Ewon Ebin (PBRS)	4,254	10.06%	Taufik Dahlan (PKR)	11,514	27.22%	42,811	11,092	63.59%
2022	P179 Ranau	Ewon Ebin (PBRS)	4,254	10.06%	Markos Siton (WARISAN)	2,657	6.28%	42,811	11,092	63.59%
2022	P179 Ranau	Ewon Ebin (PBRS)	4,254	10.06%	Azizul Julirin (PEJUANG)	1,267	3.00%	42,811	11,092	63.59%

== Honours ==
- Malaysia
  - Companion of the Order of the Defender of the Realm (JMN) (1999)
- Sabah
  - Commander of the Order of Kinabalu (PGDK) – Datuk (1994)
