= Ranau =

Ranau Ranau Town
- Town and District Capital
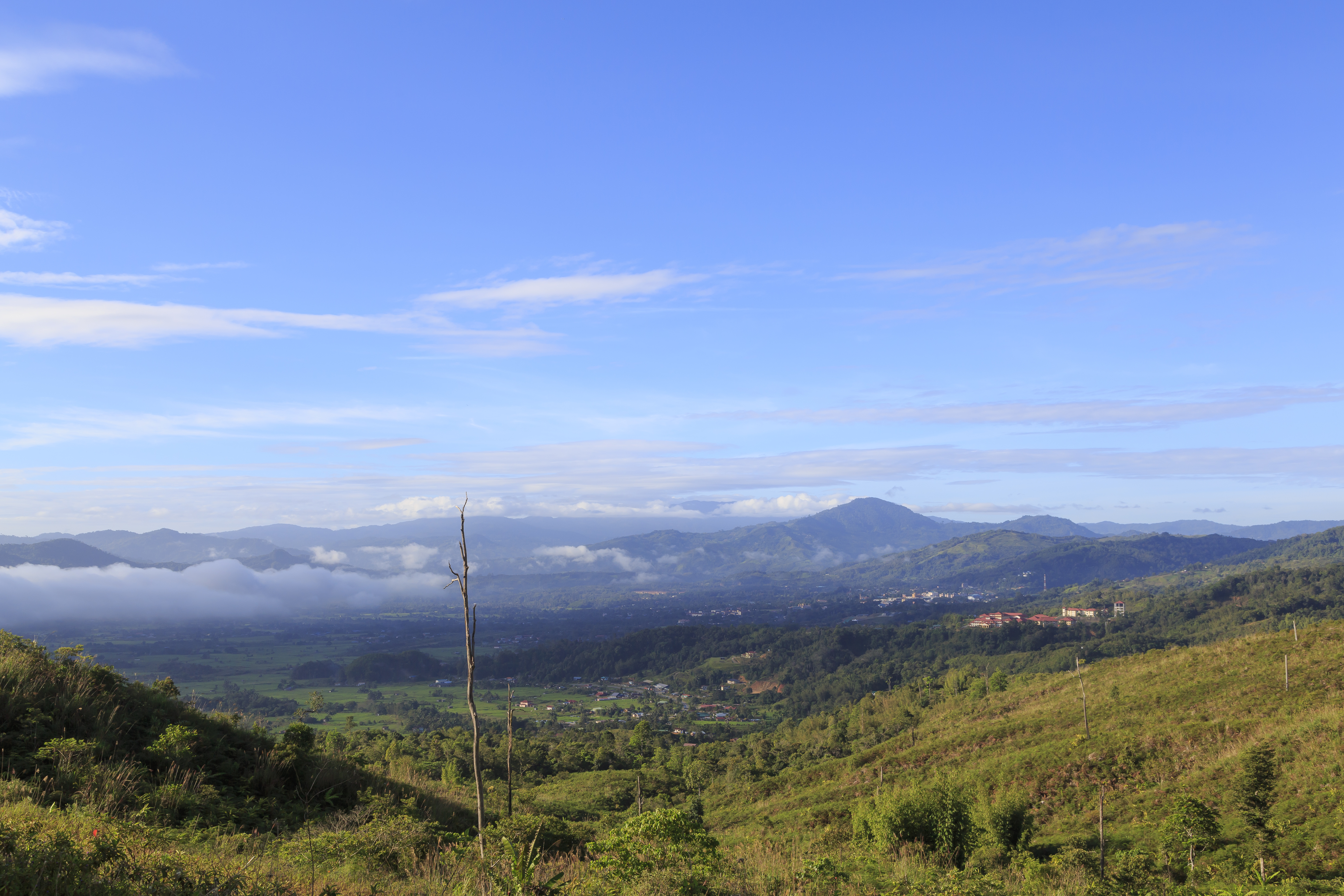
- Ranau as seen from the north.

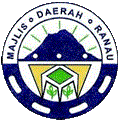
- Seal

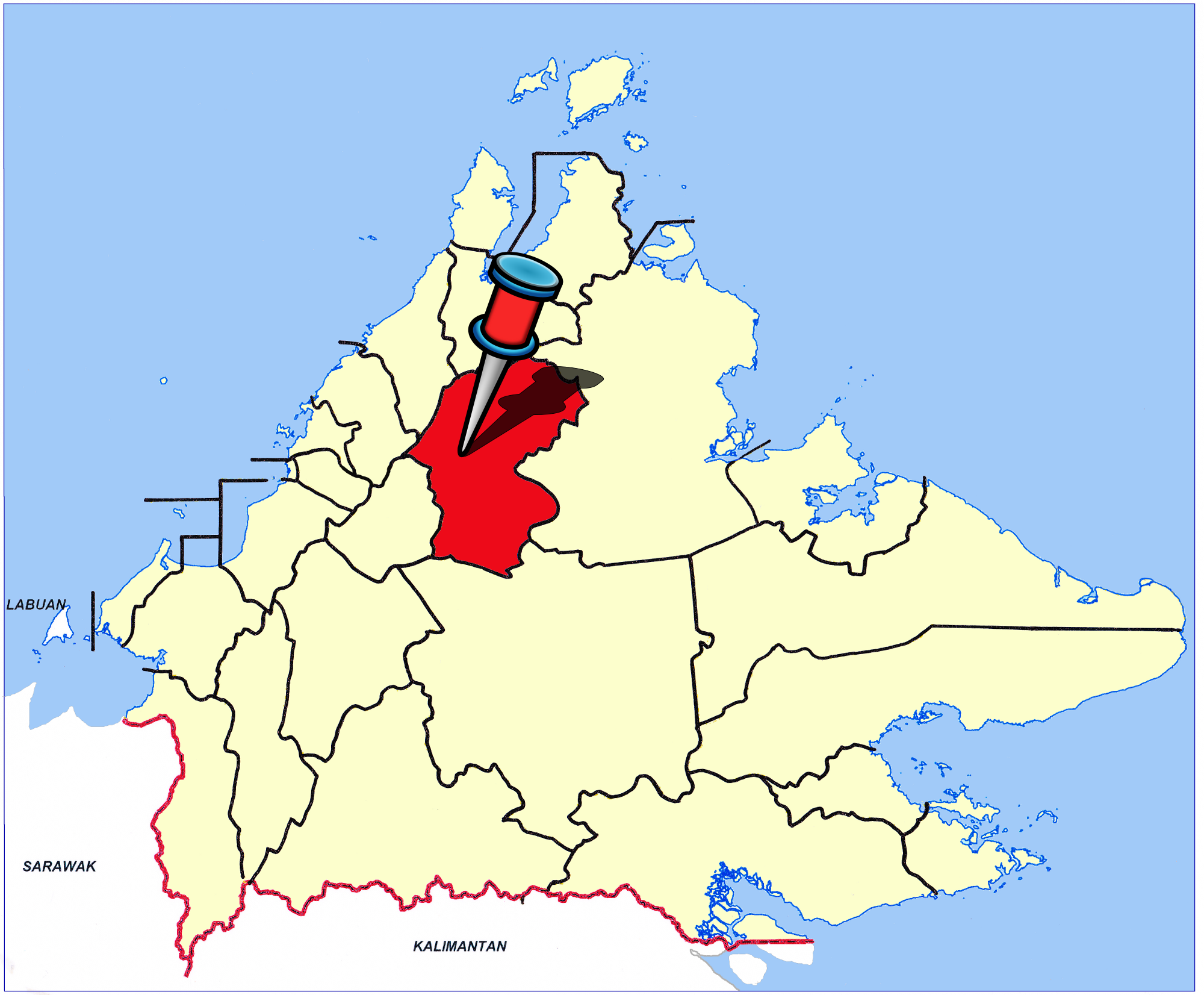
- Coordinates: 5°58′00″N 116°41′00″E
- Country: Malaysia
- State: Sabah
- Division: West Coast
- District: Ranau
- Subdistrict: Ranau Subdistrict: 1. Nalapak; 2. Paginatan; 3. Kundasang; 4. Liwagu; 5. Lipasu; 6. Tagudon; 7. Karanaan; 8. Lohan; 9. Bongkud; 10. Timbua; 11. Malinsau; 12. Kaingaran; 13. Randagong

Government
  - Ranau District Officer: Jumain Bin Abdul Ghani
  - Local Community Leaders (District Leaders): K.D Muhasip Haji Ruman
  - MP: Honorable Tuan Jonathan Bin Yasin (GRS) (Ranau)

Area
  - Total: 3,608.00 km^{2} (1,393.057 sq mi)
- Elevation: 1,175 m (3,855 ft)
- Highest elevation: 4,095 m (13,435 ft)

Population (2023)
  - Total: 87,500
- Time zone: GMT +08:00
- Neighborhood Area: Kundasang
- Weekly Market: Saturday
- Plate Number: SA (1980-2018); SY (2018-2023); SJ (2023-); SS (1980-2018); SM (2018-); SK; SU

Ranau Town (Malay: Pekan Ranau) is the capital of the Ranau District in the West Coast Division of Sabah, Malaysia. Its population was estimated to be around 87,500 in 2023.

The federal constituency represented in the Dewan Rakyat is Ranau (federal constituency).

== Climate ==
Ranau has a tropical rainforest climate (Af) with heavy rainfall year-round.

Climate data for Ranau
Month	Jan	Feb	Mar	Apr	May	Jun	Jul	Aug	Sep	Oct	Nov	Dec	Year
Mean daily maximum °C (°F)	27.2 (81.0)	27.3 (81.1)	27.8 (82.0)	28.5 (83.3)	28.7 (83.7)	28.2 (82.8)	28.0 (82.4)	28.1 (82.6)	27.9 (82.2)	27.8 (82.0)	27.7 (81.9)	27.5 (81.5)	27.9 (82.2)
Daily mean °C (°F)	23.6 (74.5)	23.7 (74.7)	24.0 (75.2)	24.6 (76.3)	24.8 (76.6)	24.3 (75.7)	24.1 (75.4)	24.2 (75.6)	24.0 (75.2)	24.1 (75.4)	24.1 (75.4)	23.9 (75.0)	24.1 (75.4)
Mean daily minimum °C (°F)	20.1 (68.2)	20.1 (68.2)	20.3 (68.5)	20.7 (69.3)	20.9 (69.6)	20.5 (68.9)	20.2 (68.4)	20.3 (68.5)	20.1 (68.2)	20.4 (68.7)	20.5 (68.9)	20.4 (68.7)	20.4 (68.7)
Average rainfall mm (inches)	216 (8.5)	153 (6.0)	136 (5.4)	143 (5.6)	234 (9.2)	206 (8.1)	175 (6.9)	172 (6.8)	203 (8.0)	202 (8.0)	220 (8.7)	221 (8.7)	2,281 (89.9)
Source: Climate-Data.org

== Gallery ==
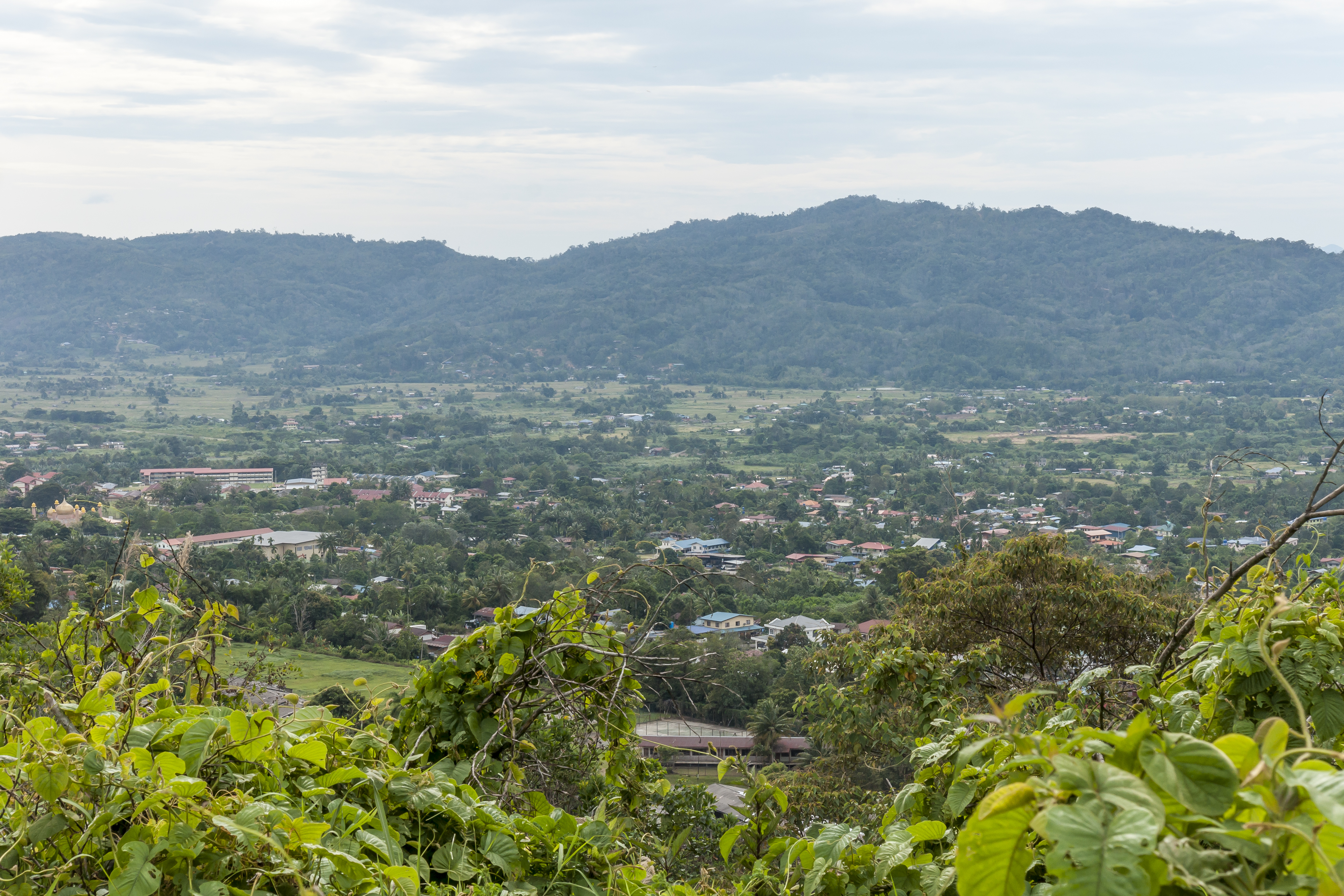
Skyline

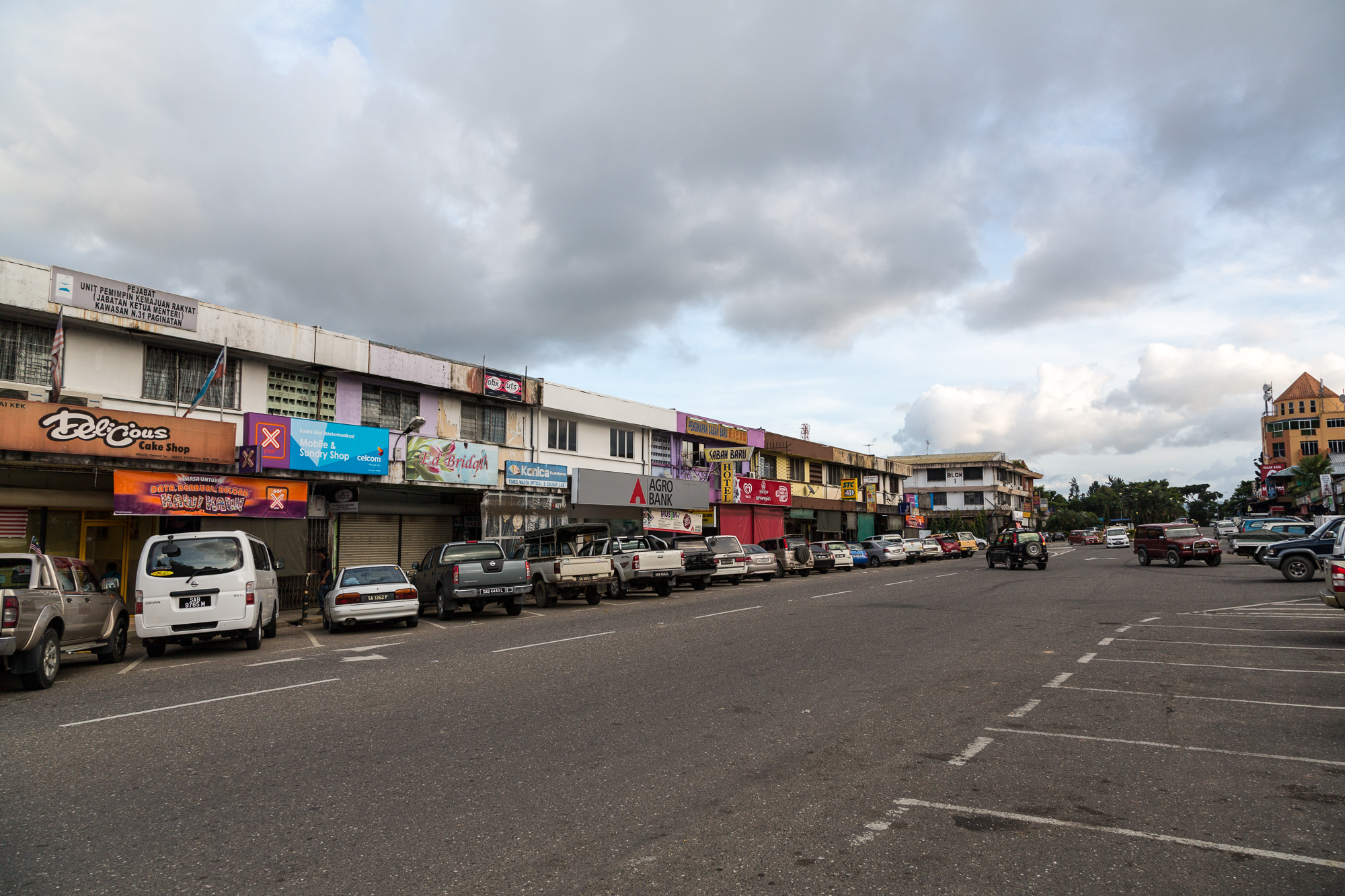
Downtown

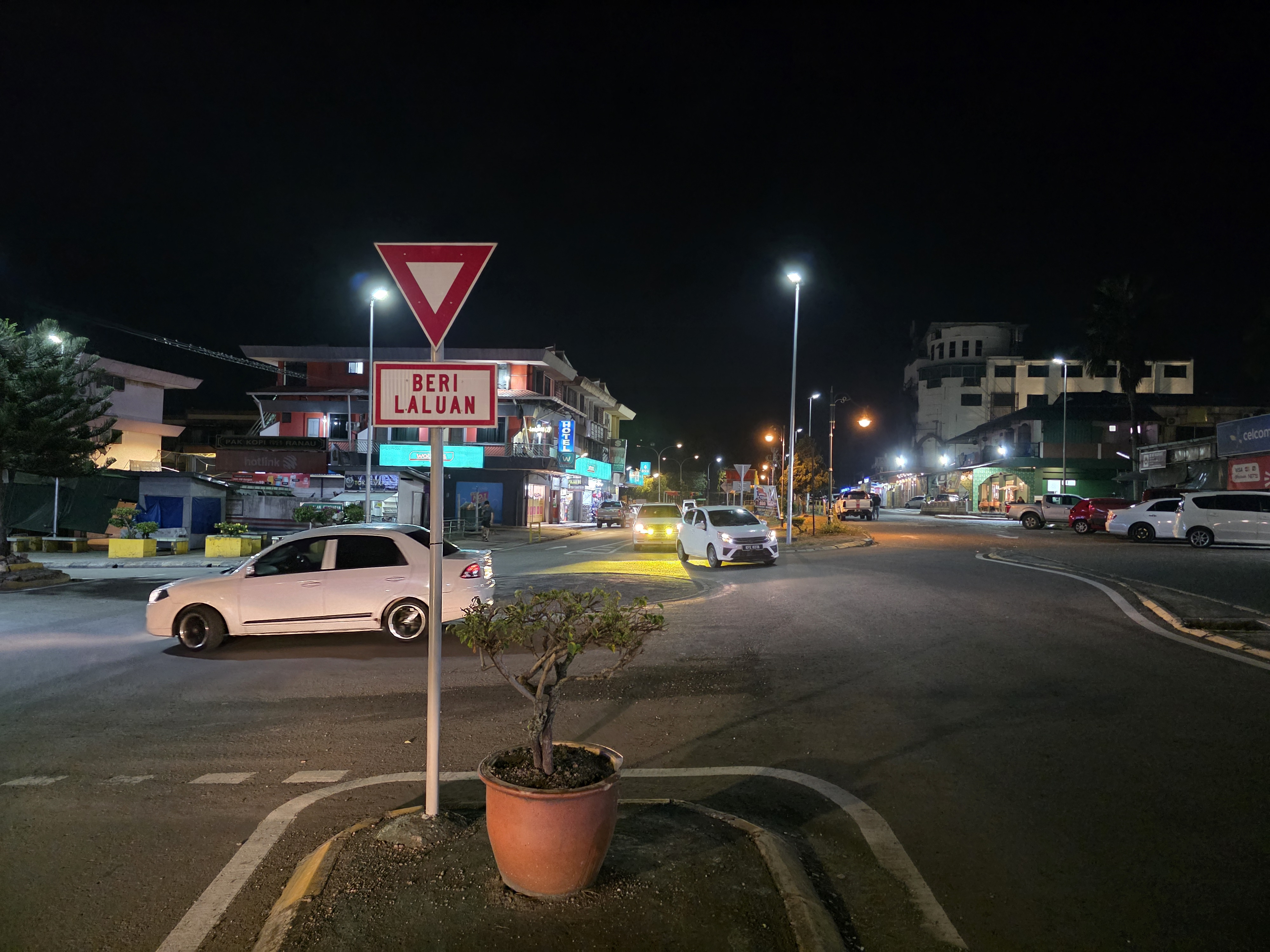
Downtown

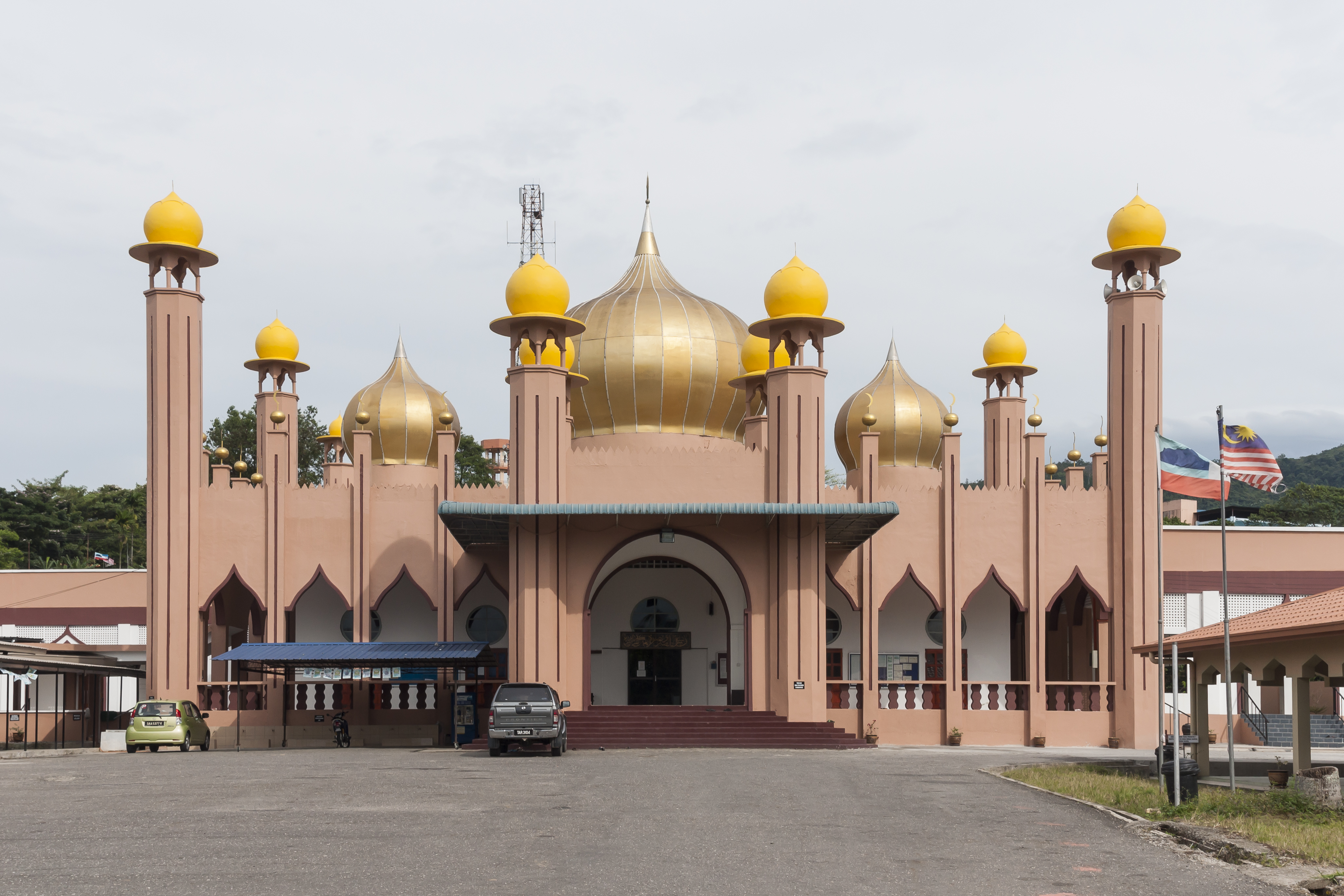
Ranau Sabah Masjid

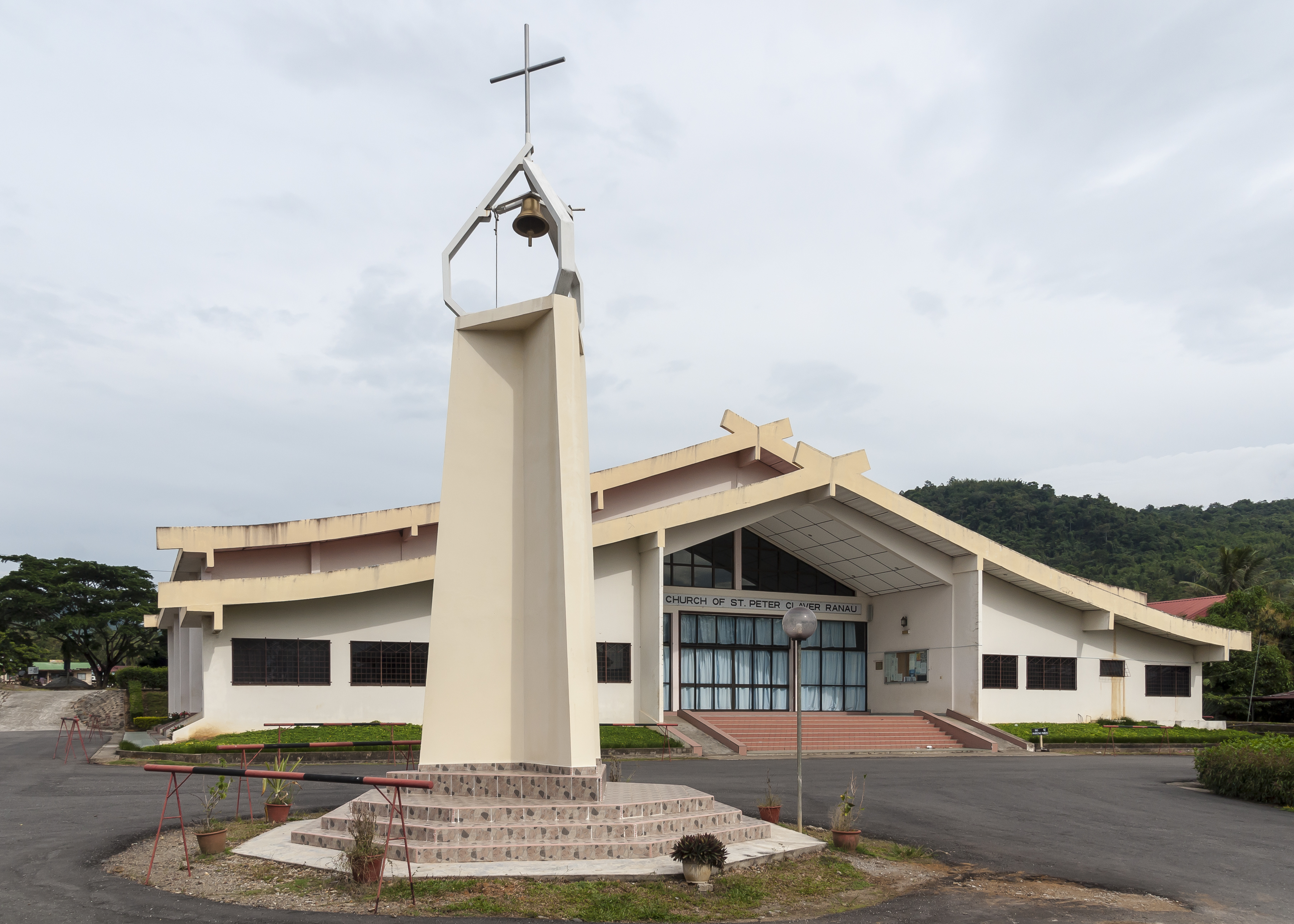
Catholic Church of St. Peter Claver

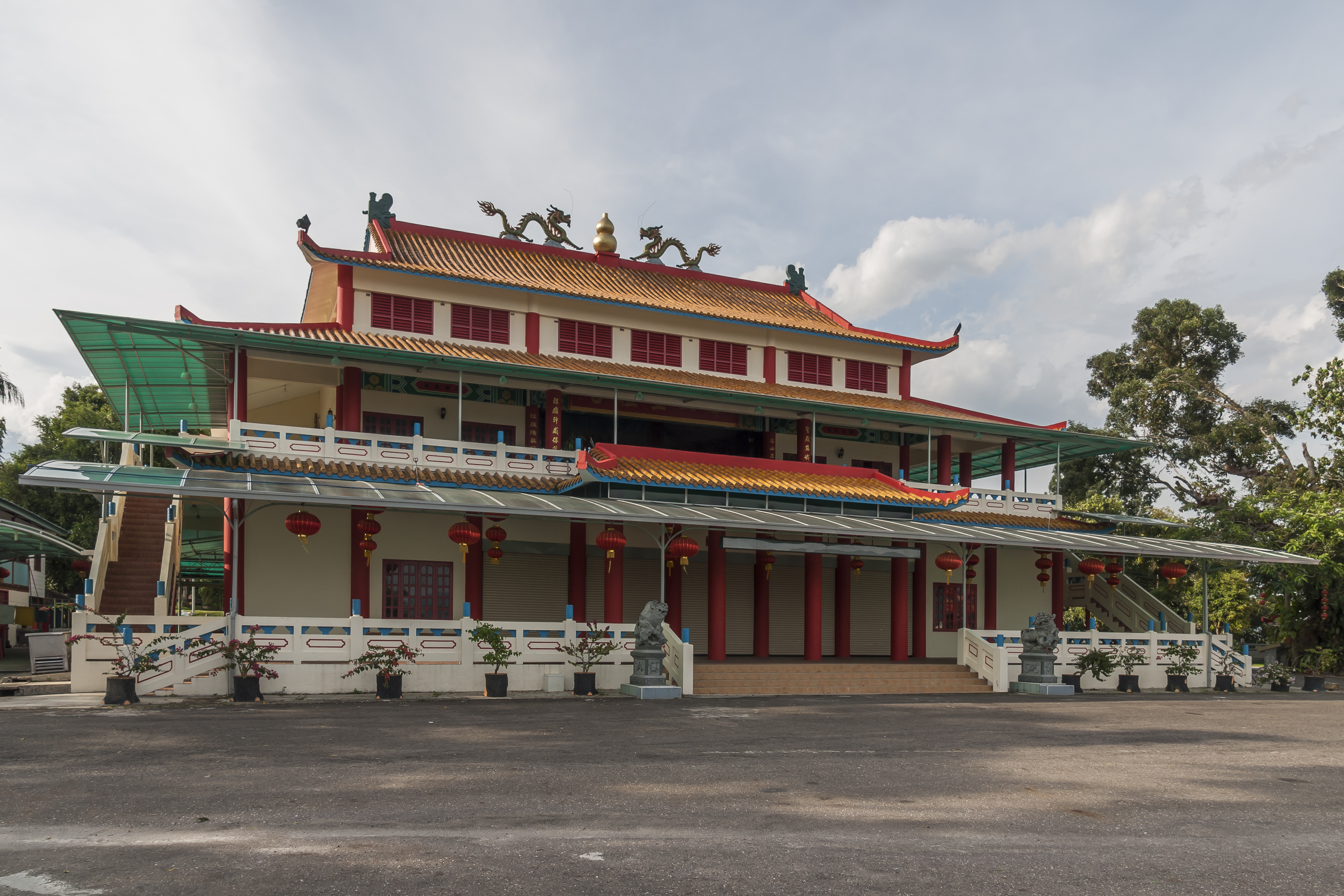
Nan Hai Guanyin Buddhist Temple

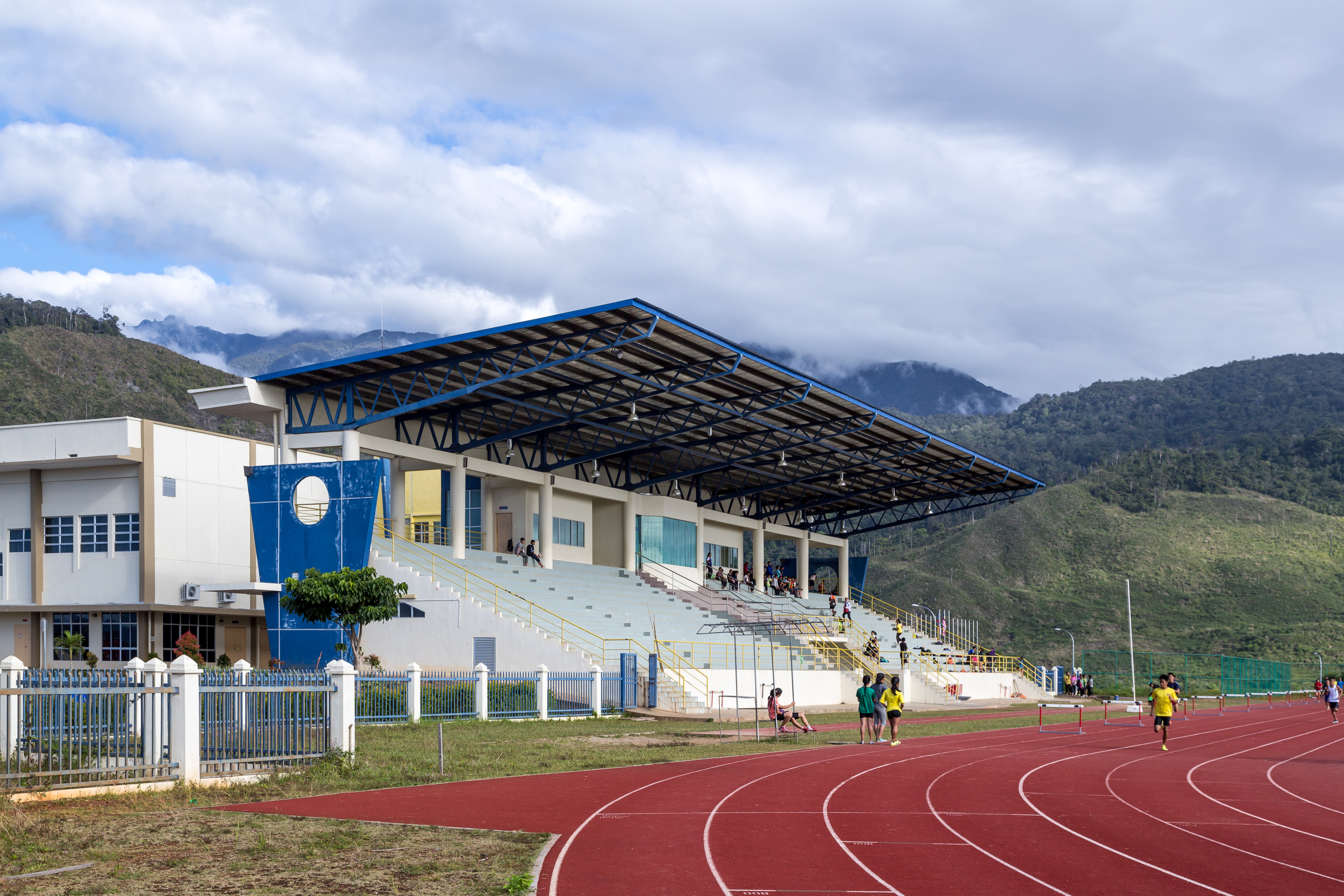
Ranau Sports Stadium

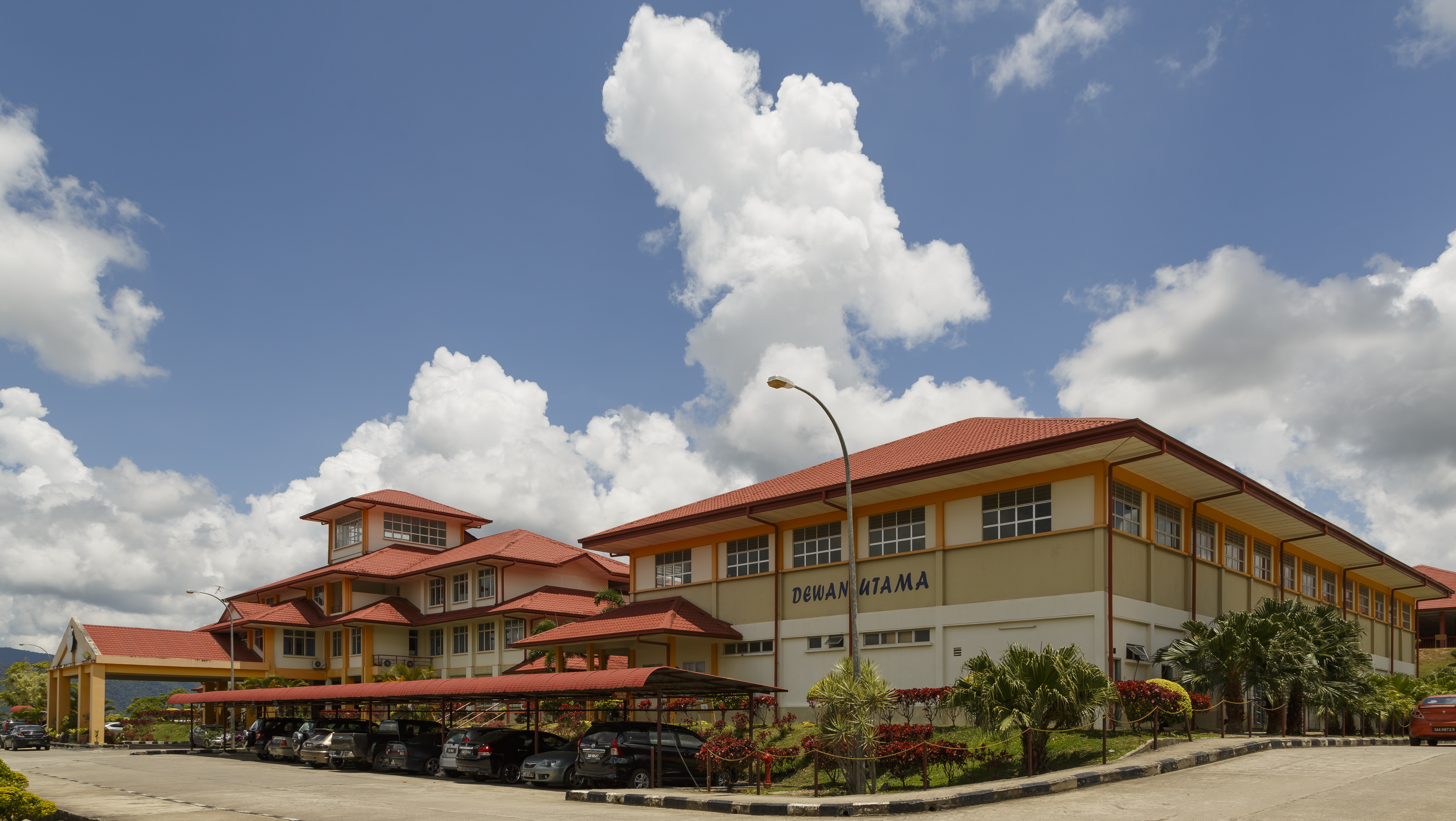
SMK Ranau (secondary school)

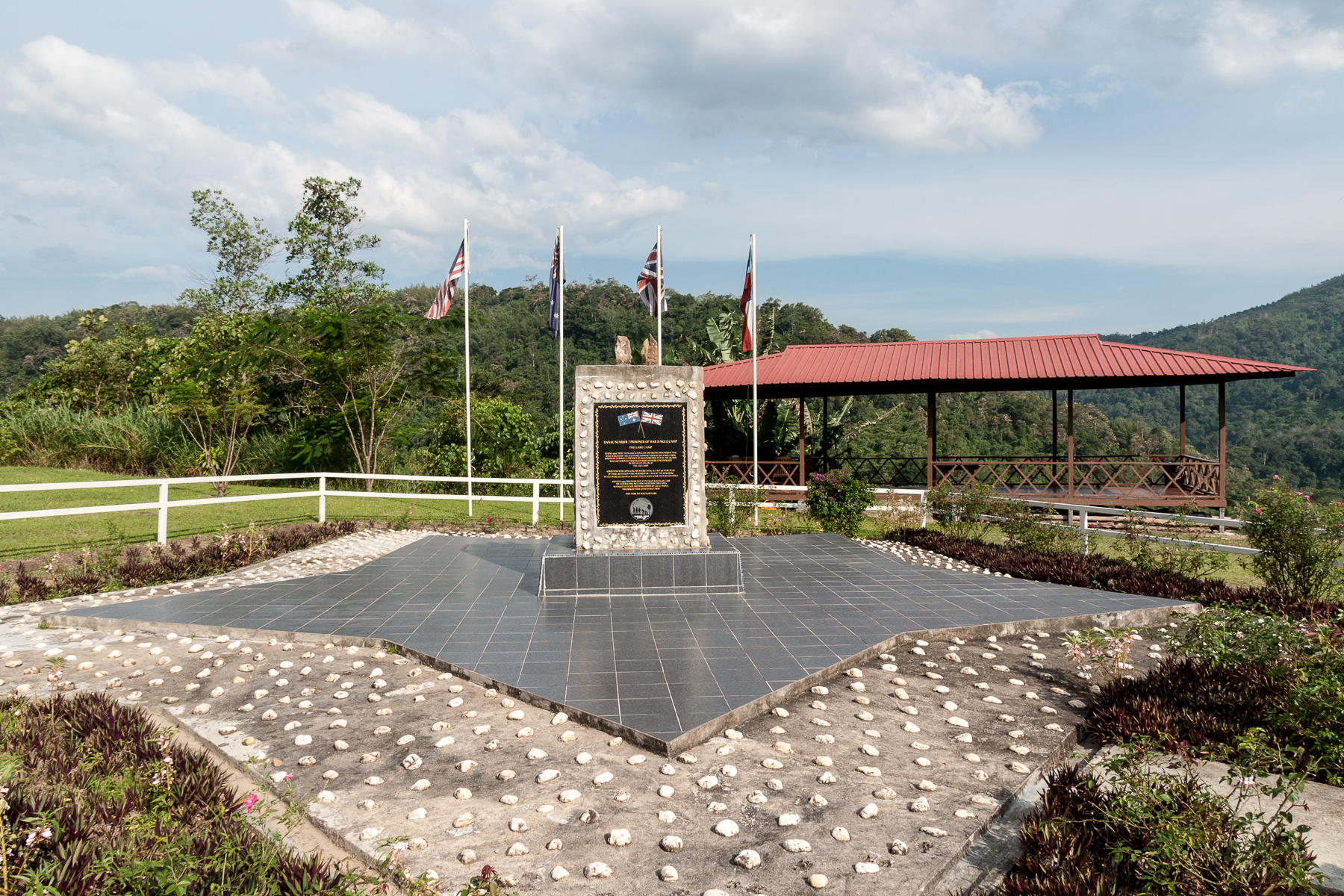
Last POW Camp Memorial
