= United Democratic Sabah People's Power Party =

United Democratic Sabah Peoples Power Party Parti Kuasa Rakyat Demokratik Bersatu Sabah SETIA
- Abbreviation: SETIA
- Founder: Shuhaiddin Langkap
- Founded: 1994
- Legalised: s
- Dissolved: 2011
- Succeeded by: Malaysian United People's Party (MUPP)
- Headquarters: Sabah, Malaysia
- Youth wing: s
- Membership (2011): 299,970
- Ideology: Nationalism
- Political position: Right-wing
- National affiliation: s
- International affiliation: s
- Colours: s
- s: s
- s: s

Website
- s

The United Democratic Sabah Peoples Power Party (Malay: Parti Kuasa Rakyat Sabah Demokratik Bersatu, abbreviated SETIA) was a political party in Malaysia. It changed its name to Malaysian United People's Party (MUPP) or Parti Bersatu Sasa Malaysia (BERSAMA) after it extends to Peninsular Malaysia on 23 March 2011.

== General election result ==
Election	Total seats won	Seats contested	Total votes	Voting Percentage	Outcome of election	Election leader
2004	0 / 222	1	1,551	0.02%	; No representation in Parliament	Shuhaidin Langkap

=== State election results ===
Sabah State Legislative Assembly
Election	Votes		Seats			Position	Status
Election	Count	%	Result	Won / contested	+/–	Position	Status
1994	846	0.2	0 / 48	0 / 6	Steady	5th	No seats
1999	4,193	0.8	0 / 48	0 / 48	Steady	▲4th	No seats
2004	8,615	2.0	0 / 60	0 / 10	Steady	4th	No seats

== See also ==
- Malaysian United People's Party (MUPP) or Parti Bersatu Sasa Malaysia (BERSAMA)
