= Beaufort (federal constituency) =

Federal constituency in Sabah, Malaysia

Beaufort (P177)
Sabah constituency

Federal constituency
- Legislature: Dewan Rakyat
- MP: Siti Aminah Aching; BN
- Constituency created: 1994
- First contested: 1995
- Last contested: 2022

Demographics
- Population (2020): 52,107
- Electors (2025): 44,544
- Area (km²): 871
- Pop. density (per km²): 59.8

Beaufort is a federal constituency in Interior Division (Beaufort District and Kuala Penyu District), Sabah, Malaysia, that has been represented in the Dewan Rakyat since 1995.

The federal constituency was created in the 1994 redistribution and is mandated to return a single member to the Dewan Rakyat under the first past the post voting system.

== Demographics ==
https://ge15.orientaldaily.com.my/seats/sabah/p

Ethnic breakdown of Beaufort's electorate as of 2022
1. Sabah Bumiputera (69.4%)
2. Malay-Muslim Bumiputera (19.6%)
3. Chinese (8.00%)
4. Other ethnicities (3.10%)

As of 2020, Beaufort has a population of 52,107 people.

Age breakdown of Beaufort's electorate as of 2022
1. 18-20 (5.51%)
2. 21-29 (18.6%)
3. 30-39 (21.3%)
4. 40-49 (18.8%)
5. 50-59 (17.2%)
6. 60-69 (11.8%)
7. 70-79 (4.61%)
8. 80-89 (1.66%)
9. above 90 (0.58%)
Gender breakdown of Beaufort's electorate as of 2022
1. Male (50.3%)
2. Female (49.7%)

== History ==
=== Polling districts ===
According to the gazette issued on 21 November 2025, the Beaufort constituency has a total of 24 polling districts.

State constituency	Polling District	Code	Location
Klias (N32)	Kota Klias	177/32/01	SMK Kota Klias
Klias (N32)	Malabau	177/32/02	SK Rancangan Klias
Klias (N32)	Kabulu	177/32/03	SK Kabulu
Klias (N32)	Takuli	177/32/04	SK Takuli
Klias (N32)	Limbawang	177/32/05	SK Mempagar; SK Kebatu; SK Lajau
Klias (N32)	Klias Baru	177/32/06	SK Klias Baru; SK Pintas
Klias (N32)	Bandar Beaufort	177/32/07	SJK (C) Kung Ming (1)
Klias (N32)	Bingkul	177/32/08	SA Negeri Kampung Bingkul
Klias (N32)	Jimpangah	177/32/09	SK Batu 60
Klias (N32)	Halogilat	177/32/10	SK Biah Batu 65
Klias (N32)	Taman Wawasan	177/32/11	SA Negeri Pekan Beaufort
Klias (N32)	Klias Estate	177/32/12	Tadika Kung Ming
Kuala Penyu (N33)	Tenambak	177/33/01	SK Tenambak
Kuala Penyu (N33)	Temporong	177/33/02	SK St. Augustine
Kuala Penyu (N33)	Sitombok	177/33/03	SJK (C) Chung Hwa
Kuala Penyu (N33)	Palu Palu	177/33/04	SK Palu-Palu
Kuala Penyu (N33)	Bundu	177/33/05	SK St. Peter Bundu
Kuala Penyu (N33)	Melampai	177/33/06	SK Menunggang
Kuala Penyu (N33)	Mansud	177/33/07	SK Mansud
Kuala Penyu (N33)	Karukan	177/33/08	SK Kerukan
Kuala Penyu (N33)	Kilugus	177/33/09	SK Kilugus
Kuala Penyu (N33)	Tanjung Aru	177/33/10	SK Tanjung Aru
Kuala Penyu (N33)	Malikai	177/33/11	SK Melikai
Kuala Penyu (N33)	Menumbok	177/33/12	SK Pekan Menumbok

=== Representation history ===
Members of Parliament for Beaufort
Parliament	No	Years	Member	Party	Vote Share
Constituency created from Kimanis and Limbawang
9th	P154	1995–1999	Nurnikman Abdullah (نورنعمان عبدالله)	BN (UMNO)	14,719; 58.84%
10th	P154	1999–2004	Anifah Aman (حنيفة أمان)	BN (UMNO)	16,009; 63.48%
11th	P177	2004–2008	Azizah Mohd Dun (عزيزة محمد دون)	BN (UMNO)	Uncontested
12th	P177	2008–2011	Lajim Ukin (لازم أوكين)	BN (UMNO)	14,780; 79.27%
12th	P177	2011–2013	Lajim Ukin (لازم أوكين)	Independent	14,780; 79.27%
13th	P177	2013–2018	Azizah Mohd Dun (عزيزة محمد دون)	BN (UMNO)	12,827; 50.52%
14th	P177	2018	Azizah Mohd Dun (عزيزة محمد دون)	BN (UMNO)	11,354; 41.72%
14th	P177	2018–2019	Azizah Mohd Dun (عزيزة محمد دون)	Independent	11,354; 41.72%
14th	P177	2019-2020	Azizah Mohd Dun (عزيزة محمد دون)	PH (BERSATU)	11,354; 41.72%
14th	P177	2020–2022	Azizah Mohd Dun (عزيزة محمد دون)	GRS (BERSATU)	11,354; 41.72%
15th	P177	2022–present	Siti Aminah Aching (سيتي أمينة أچيڠ)	BN (UMNO)	10,570; 36.08%

=== State constituency ===
Parliamentary constituency	State constituency					
Parliamentary constituency	1967–1974	1974–1985	1985–1995	1995–2004	2004–2020	2020–present
Beaufort				Bongawan		
Beaufort				Klias		
Beaufort				Kuala Penyu		

=== Historical boundaries ===
State Constituency	Area		
State Constituency	1994	2003	2019
Bongawan	Bongawan; Kampung Jawa; Kampung Kuala; Kimanis; Membakut		
Klias	Beaufort; Kampung Nukahan; Kampung Sinuko; Klias; Limbawang	Beaufort; Kampung Nukahan; Klias; Limbawang; Lumat	
Kuala Penyu	Binsuluk; Kalugus; Menumbok; Sawangan; Tenggilung	Kalugus; Kuala Penyu; Menumbok; Sawangan; Tenggilung	

=== Current state assembly members ===
No.	State Constituency	Member	Coalition (Party)
N32	Klias	Isnin Aliasnih	GRS (GAGASAN)
N33	Kuala Penyu	Limus Jury	GRS (GAGASAN)

=== Local governments & postcodes ===
No.	State Constituency	Local Government	Postcode
N32	Klias	Beaufort District Council	89740 Kuala Penyu; 89760 Menumbok, Kuala Penyu; 89800 Beaufort
N33	Kuala Penyu	Kuala Penyu District Council	89740 Kuala Penyu; 89760 Menumbok, Kuala Penyu; 89800 Beaufort

== Election results ==
Malaysian general election, 2022
Party	Candidate	Votes	%	∆%
BN	Siti Aminah Aching	10,570	36.08	▼5.64
KDM	Johair Mat Lani	8,052	27.48	▲27.48
PH	Dikin Musah	7,835	26.74	▼2.05
Heritage	Masri Adul	2,152	7.35	▲7.35
Independent	Johan @ Christopher Ot Ghani	546	1.86	▲1.86
Independent	Matlani Sabli	143	0.49	▲0.49
Total valid votes		29,298	100.00	
Total rejected ballots		552		
Unreturned ballots		74		
Turnout		29,924	67.74	▼16.70
Registered electors		43,248		
Majority		2,518	8.59	▼3.65
BN hold		Swing		
Source(s) https://lom.agc.gov.my/ilims/upload/portal/akta/outputp/1753262/PUB619_2022.pdf

Malaysian general election, 2018
Party	Candidate	Votes	%	∆%
BN	Azizah Mohd Dun	11,354	41.72	▼8.80
Sabah People's Hope Party	Lajim Ukin	8,023	29.48	▲29.48
PKR	Johan @ Christopher Ot Ghani	7,835	28.79	▲1.65
Total valid votes		27,212	100.00	
Total rejected ballots		799		
Unreturned ballots		143		
Turnout		28,154	84.44	▼1.95
Registered electors		33,342		
Majority		3,331	12.24	▲9.59
BN hold		Swing		
Source(s) "His Majesty's Government Gazette - Notice of Contested Election, Parliament for the State of Sabah [P.U. (B) 246/2018]" (PDF). Attorney General's Chambers of Malaysia. 3 May 2018. "Federal Government Gazette - Results of Contested Election and Statements of the Poll after the Official Addition of Votes, Parliamentary Constituencies for the State of Sabah [P.U. (B) 320/2018]" (PDF). Attorney General's Chambers of Malaysia. 28 May 2018. Archived from the original (PDF) on December 29, 2019.

Malaysian general election, 2013
Party	Candidate	Votes	%	∆%
BN	Azizah Mohd Dun	12,827	50.52	▼28.75
PKR	Lajim Ukin	12,155	47.87	▲27.14
STAR	Guan Dee Koh Hoi	409	1.61	▲1.61
Total valid votes		25,391	100.00	
Total rejected ballots		559		
Unreturned ballots		50		
Turnout		26,000	86.39	▲14.17
Registered electors		30,097		
Majority		673	2.65	▼55.89
BN hold		Swing		
Source(s) "Federal Government Gazette - Notice of Contested Election, Parliament for the State of Sabah [P.U. (B) 183/2013]" (PDF). Attorney General's Chambers of Malaysia. 26 April 2013. Archived from the original (PDF) on 30 September 2018. "Federal Government Gazette - Results of Contested Election and Statements of the Poll after the Official Addition of Votes, Parliamentary Constituencies for the State of Sabah [P.U. (B) 224/2013]" (PDF). Attorney General's Chambers of Malaysia. 22 May 2013. Archived from the original (PDF) on 30 September 2018.

Malaysian general election, 2008
Party	Candidate	Votes	%	∆%
BN	Lajim Ukin	14,780	79.27	
PKR	Lajim Md Yusof	3,866	20.73	
Total valid votes		18,646	100.00	
Total rejected ballots		681		
Unreturned ballots		19		
Turnout		19,346	72.22	
Registered electors		26,788		
Majority		10,914	58.54	
BN hold		Swing		

Malaysian general election, 2004
Party	Candidate	Votes	%	∆%
On the nomination day, Azizah Mohd Dun won uncontested.
BN	Azizah Mohd Dun			
Total valid votes			100.00	
Total rejected ballots				
Unreturned ballots				
Turnout				
Registered electors				
Majority				
BN hold		Swing		

Malaysian general election, 1999
Party	Candidate	Votes	%	∆%
BN	Anifah Aman @ Haniff Amman	16,009	63.48	▲4.64
PBS	Pengiran Aliuddin Pengiran Tahir	9,209	36.52	▼3.76
Total valid votes		25,218	100.00	
Total rejected ballots		440		
Unreturned ballots		49		
Turnout		25,707	64.26	▼6.05
Registered electors		40,004		
Majority		6,800	26.96	▲8.40
BN hold		Swing		

Malaysian general election, 1995
Party	Candidate	Votes	%
BN	Nurnikman Abdullah	14,719	58.84
PBS	Abdul Rashid Abu Bakar	10,076	40.28
Independent	Anis Tuali	221	0.88
Total valid votes		25,016	100.00
Total rejected ballots		338	
Unreturned ballots		22	
Turnout		25,376	70.31
Registered electors		36,091	
Majority		4,643	18.56
This was a new constituency created.
