= Kawang (state constituency) =

Kawang (N28)
Sabah constituency

State constituency
- Legislature: Sabah State Legislative Assembly
MLA
Ghulamhaidar Khan
GRS
- Constituency created: 1976
- First contested: 1976
- Last contested: 2025

Demographics
- Electors (2025): 23,823

Kawang is a state constituency in Sabah, Malaysia, that is represented in the Sabah State Legislative Assembly.

== Demographics ==
As of 2020, Kawang has a population of 51,590 people.

Ethnic breakdown of Kawang's electorate as of 2025
1. Muslim Bumiputera (81.0%)
2. Non-Muslim Bumiputera (16.0%)
3. Chinese (3.00%)
4. Other ethnicities (0.00%)

== History ==
=== Polling districts ===
According to the gazette issued on 31 October 2022, the Kawang constituency has a total of 6 polling districts.

State constituency	Polling Districts	Code	Location
Kawang（N28）	Pengalat	175/28/01	SMK Pengalat Papar
Kawang（N28）	Kawang	175/28/02	SK Kawang
Kawang（N28）	Kinarut	175/28/03	SK Pekan Kinarut; SJK (C) Kin Kiau
Kawang（N28）	Kampung Laut	175/28/04	SMK Kinarut
Kawang（N28）	Pengalat Kecil	175/28/05	SMK Pengalat Papar
Kawang（N28）	Beringgis	175/28/06	SK Beringis

=== Representation history ===
Member of Sabah State Legislative Assembly for Kawang
Assembly	No	Years	Member	Party
Constituency created from Papar
5th	N24	1976	Fred Sinidol @ Tokudung	BERJAYA
5th	N24	1976 – 1981	Fred Sinidol @ Tokudung	BN (BERJAYA)
6th	N24	1981 – 1985	Fred Sinidol @ Tokudung	BN (BERJAYA)
7th	N32	1985 – 1986	Wenches Lajingah	PBS
8th	N32	1986 – 1990	Ariah Tengku Ahmad	PBS
9th	N32	1990 – 1994	Ariah Tengku Ahmad	GR (PBS)
10th	N32	1994 – 1999	Osu Sukam	BN (UMNO)
11th	N18	1999 – 2004	Osu Sukam	BN (UMNO)
12th	N21	2004 – 2008	Ghulamhaidar Khan	BN (UMNO)
13th	N21	2008 – 2013	Ghulamhaidar Khan	BN (UMNO)
14th	N21	2013 – 2018	Ghulamhaidar Khan	BN (UMNO)
15th	N21	2018	Ghulamhaidar Khan	BN (UMNO)
15th	N21	2018 – 2019	Ghulamhaidar Khan	Independent
15th	N21	2019 – 2020	Ghulamhaidar Khan	PH (BERSATU)
15th	N21	2020	Ghulamhaidar Khan	PN (BERSATU)
16th	N28	2020 – 2022	Ghulamhaidar Khan	GRS (BERSATU)
16th	N28	2022 - 2023	Ghulamhaidar Khan	GRS (Direct)
16th	N28	2023–2025	Ghulamhaidar Khan	GRS (GAGASAN)
17th	N28	2025–present	Ghulamhaidar Khan	GRS (GAGASAN)

== Election results ==
Sabah state election, 2025
Party	Candidate	Votes	%	∆%
GRS	Ghulamhaidar Khan	11,688	65.96	▲65.96
BN	Jamal Narubi	2,925	16.51	▲16.51
Heritage	Nin Jellih	2,454	13.85	▼10.07
Homeland Solidarity Party	Beverley Natalie Koh	491	2.77	▲2.77
Sabah Dream Party	Samail Bulongik	162	0.91	▲0.91
Total valid votes		17,720		
Total rejected ballots		252		
Unreturned ballots		35		
Turnout		18,007	75.59	▲1.31
Registered electors		23,823		
Majority		8,763	49.44	▲3.51
GRS gain from PN		Swing		?

Sabah state election, 2020
Party	Candidate	Votes	%	∆%
PN	Ghulamhaidar Khan	7,747	69.85	▲69.85
Sabah Heritage Party	Musli Sapan	2,653	23.92	▼14.51
Love Sabah Party	Abdul Rahim Lassim	192	1.73	▲1.73
USNO (Baru)	Awang Arip Nasib	163	1.47	▲1.47
LDP	Janrywine J Lusin	119	1.07	▲1.07
Total valid votes		10,874	98.04	
Total rejected ballots		181	1.63	
Unreturned ballots		36	0.32	
Turnout		11,091	74.28	▼10.50
Registered electors		14,932		
Majority		5,094	45.93	▲31.32
PN gain from BN		Swing		?
Source(s) "RESULTS OF CONTESTED ELECTION AND STATEMENTS OF THE POLL AFTER THE OFFICIAL ADDITION OF VOTES" (PDF).

Sabah state election, 2018
Party	Candidate	Votes	%	∆%
BN	Ghulamhaidar Khan	10,388	53.04	▼18.78
Sabah Heritage Party	Salleh Eddris	7,526	38.43	▲38.43
Sabah People's Hope Party	Matlin Jilon	781	3.99	▲3.99
Sabah Native Co-operation Party	Wahid Ismail	201	1.03	▲1.03
Total valid votes		18,896	96.48	
Total rejected ballots		322	1.64	
Unreturned ballots		367	1.87	
Turnout		19,585	84.78	▼1.32
Registered electors		23,102		
Majority		2,862	14.61	▼37.35
BN hold		Swing		
Source(s) "RESULTS OF CONTESTED ELECTION AND STATEMENTS OF THE POLL AFTER THE OFFICIAL ADDITION OF VOTES".

Sabah state election, 2013
Party	Candidate	Votes	%	∆%
BN	Ghulamhaidar Khan	12,301	71.82	▲0.16
PKR	Dzulkefli Safar	3,401	19.86	▼1.28
SAPP	Edward Dagul	906	5.29	▲5.29
STAR	Akop Damsah @ Yakup Damsah	248	1.45	▲1.45
Total valid votes		16,418	95.85	
Total rejected ballots		237	1.38	
Unreturned ballots		35	0.20	
Turnout		17,128	86.10	▲9.08
Registered electors		19,901		
Majority		8,900	51.96	▲1.44
BN hold		Swing		
Source(s) "KEPUTUSAN PILIHAN RAYA UMUM DEWAN UNDANGAN NEGERI". Archived from the original on 2022-07-02.

Sabah state election, 2008
Party	Candidate	Votes	%	∆%
BN	Ghulamhaidar Khan	8,605	71.66	▼8.08
PKR	Zavilin @ Evelyn Gabili	2,539	21.14	▲21.14
Independent	Pengiran Othman Rauf	295	2.46	▲2.46
BERSEKUTU	Maiji Jaigul	144	1.20	▲1.20
Total valid votes		11,583	96.46	
Total rejected ballots		262	2.18	
Unreturned ballots		163	1.36	
Turnout		12,008	77.02	▲6.59
Registered electors		15,591		
Majority		6,066	50.52	▼10.44
BN hold		Swing		
Source(s) "KEPUTUSAN PILIHAN RAYA UMUM DEWAN UNDANGAN NEGERI SABAH BAGI TAHUN 2008".

Sabah state election, 2004
Party	Candidate	Votes	%	∆%
BN	Ghulamhaidar Khan	8,213	79.74	▲22.94
PAS	Maiji Jaigul	1,934	18.78	▲18.78
Total valid votes		10,147	98.51	
Total rejected ballots		142	1.38	
Unreturned ballots		11	0.11	
Turnout		10,300	70.43	▼9.49
Registered electors		14,624		
Majority		6,279	60.96	▲43.05
BN hold		Swing		
Source(s) "KEPUTUSAN PILIHAN RAYA UMUM DEWAN UNDANGAN NEGERI SABAH BAGI TAHUN 2004".

Sabah state election, 1999
Party	Candidate	Votes	%	∆%
BN	Osu Sukam	7,017	56.80	▲7.65
PBS	Ariah Tengku Ahmad	4,804	38.89	▼9.59
BERSEKUTU	Mohd Kanit Omar	282	2.28	▲2.28
SETIA	Pengiran Othman Rauf	117	0.95	▲0.95
Independent	Sajit Singh @ Patrick Singh	49	0.40	▲0.40
Total valid votes		12,269	99.31	
Total rejected ballots		85	0.69	
Unreturned ballots		0	0.00	
Turnout		12,354	79.92	▼1.19
Registered electors		15,458		
Majority		2,213	17.91	▲17.24
BN hold		Swing		
Source(s) "KEPUTUSAN PILIHAN RAYA UMUM DEWAN UNDANGAN NEGERI SABAH BAGI TAHUN 1999".

Sabah state election, 1994
Party	Candidate	Votes	%	∆%
BN	Osu Sukam	4,699	49.15	▲8.54
PBS	Ariah Tengku Ahmad	4,635	48.48	▼0.66
Independent	Norbert Chin Chuan Siong	110	1.15	▲1.15
Independent	John Dagul	32	0.33	▲0.33
Independent	Duing Sumppang @ Uwing	12	0.13	▲0.13
Total valid votes		9,488	99.24	
Total rejected ballots		73	0.76	
Unreturned ballots		0	0.00	
Turnout		9,561	81.11	▲1.41
Registered electors		11,787		
Majority		64	0.67	▼7.86
BN gain from PBS		Swing		?
Source(s) "KEPUTUSAN PILIHAN RAYA UMUM DEWAN UNDANGAN NEGERI SABAH BAGI TAHUN 1994".

Sabah state election, 1990
Party	Candidate	Votes	%	∆%
PBS	Ariah Tengku Ahmad	3,956	49.14	▼3.77
BN	James Ghani	3,269	40.61	▲40.61
Independent	Wenches Lajingah	383	4.76	▲4.76
BERJAYA	Kasim Salleh	209	2.60	▼2.08
PRS	Dzulkefli Safar	65	0.81	▲0.81
AKAR	George Mikil	58	0.72	▲0.72
Total valid votes		9,740	98.63	
Total rejected ballots		110	1.37	
Unreturned ballots		0	0.00	
Turnout		8,050	79.70	▼2.99
Registered electors		10,100		
Majority		687	8.53	▼4.30
PBS hold		Swing		
Source(s) "KEPUTUSAN PILIHAN RAYA UMUM DEWAN UNDANGAN NEGERI SABAH BAGI TAHUN 1990".

Sabah state election, 1986
Party	Candidate	Votes	%	∆%
PBS	Irene Daphne Pritchard @ Ariah Ahmad	3,188	52.91	▲52.91
USNO	Nerawi Lampong	2,415	40.08	▲0.53
BERJAYA	Malitim Lajami @ Malitin Lajame	282	4.68	▼49.99
Total valid votes		5,885	97.68	
Total rejected ballots		140	2.32	
Unreturned ballots		0	0.00	
Turnout		6,025	82.69	▼2.05
Registered electors		7,286		
Majority		773	12.83	▼2.29
PBS gain from BERJAYA		Swing		?
Source(s) "KEPUTUSAN PILIHAN RAYA UMUM DEWAN UNDANGAN NEGERI SABAH BAGI TAHUN 1986".

Sabah state election, 1985
Party	Candidate	Votes	%	∆%
PBS	Wenches Lajingah	2,122	40.88	▲40.88
USNO	Osu Sukam	1,923	37.04	▼3.20
BERJAYA	Fred Sinidol	956	18.42	▼37.20
BERSEPADU	Pengiran Othman Rauf	190	3.66	▲3.66
Total valid votes		5,191	100.00	
Total rejected ballots		48		
Unreturned ballots		0		
Turnout		5,239	81.83	▼2.91
Registered electors		6,402		
Majority		199	3.83	▼11.55
PBS gain from BN		Swing		-

Sabah state election, 1981
Party	Candidate	Votes	%	∆%
BERJAYA	Fred Sinidol @ Tokudung	2,976	55.62	▲5.71
USNO	Osu Sukam	2,153	40.24	▼9.32
PAS	Patrit Sendu	222	4.15	▲4.15
Total valid votes		5,351	100.00	
Total rejected ballots		93		
Unreturned ballots		0		
Turnout		5,444	84.74	▼3.85
Registered electors		6,424		
Majority		823	15.38	▲15.03
BERJAYA hold		Swing		
Source(s) "Sabah election: How they fared". New Straits Times. 1981-03-29.

Sabah state election, 1976
Party	Candidate	Votes	%
BERJAYA	Fred Sinidol	2,260	49.91
USNO	Abdul Karim Abdul Ghani	2,244	49.56
USPO	Goerge Wong @ George Gontuni	24	0.53
Total valid votes		4,528	100.00
Total rejected ballots		82	
Unreturned ballots		0	
Turnout		4,610	88.59
Registered electors		5,204	
Majority		16	0.35
This was a new constituency created
