= Osu Sukam =

Malaysian politician

Yang Berbahagia Tan Sri Datuk Seri Panglima Osu Sukam PSM SPDK DA PGDK
- اوسو بن سوكم

12th Chief Minister of Sabah
- In office 14 March 1999 – 27 March 2001
- Governor: Sakaran Dandai
- Deputy: Tham Nyip Shen; Lajim Ukin; Wilfred Bumburing
- Preceded by: Bernard Giluk Dompok
- Succeeded by: Chong Kah Kiat
- Constituency: Kawang

Sabah State Minister of Finance
- In office 28 May 1998 – 27 March 2001
- Governor: Sakaran Dandai
- Chief Minister: Bernard Giluk Dompok; Himself
- Assistant Minister: Karim Bujang
- Preceded by: Abdul Ghapur Salleh
- Succeeded by: Musa Aman
- Constituency: Kawang

Deputy Chief Minister of Sabah
- In office 28 May 1998 – 14 March 1999 Serving with Joseph Kurup; Tham Nyip Shen
- Governor: Sakaran Dandai
- Chief Minister: Bernard Giluk Dompok
- Preceded by: Abdul Ghapur Salleh
- Succeeded by: Lajim Ukin
- Constituency: Kawang

Member of the Malaysian Parliament for Papar
- In office 3 August 1986 – 21 March 2004
- Preceded by: Position established
- Succeeded by: Rosnah Shirlin (UMNO–BN)
- Majority: 206 (1986); 513 (1990); 3,116 (1995); 6,405 (1999)

Member of the Sabah State Legislative Assembly for Kawang
- In office 19 February 1994 – 21 March 2004
- Preceded by: Ariah Tengku Ahmad (PBS)
- Succeeded by: Ghulam Haidar Khan Bahadar (UMNO—BN)
- Majority: 64 (1994); 2,213 (1999)

Member of the Sabah State Legislative Assembly for Sulaman
- In office 5 May 1986 – 30 November 1986
- Preceded by: Wences Lajingah (PBS)
- Succeeded by: Jasni Gindug (PBS)
- Majority: 403 (1986)

Personal details
- Born: Osu bin Sukam; 19 February 1949 (age 77) Papar, Crown Colony of North Borneo (now Sabah, Malaysia)
- Party: United Malays National Organisation (UMNO)
- Other political affiliations: Barisan Nasional (BN); Perikatan Nasional (PN); Muafakat Nasional (MN)
- Education: University of Buckingham

Osu bin Sukam (Jawi: اوسو بن سوكم; born 19 February 1949) is a Malaysian politician who served as the 12th Chief Minister of Sabah from March 1999 to March 2001, Member of Parliament (MP) for Papar from August 1986 to March 2004 and Member of the Sabah State Legislative Assembly (MLA) for Kawang from February 1994 to March 2004. Following the rotation system in place at that time, Osu, an ethnic Bajau, held the post for two years representing the Muslim bumiputras of Sabah. In 2001, he was replaced by Chong Kah Kiat. Until 14 July 2005, he was a member of a ruling United Malays National Organisation (UMNO).

== Election results ==
Parliament of Malaysia
Year	Constituency	Candidate	Votes	Pct	Opponent(s)	Votes	Pct	Ballots cast	Majority	Turnout
1986	P146 Papar, Sabah	Osu Sukam (USNO)	4,844	48.92%	James Ghani (IND)	4,638	46.83%	9,995	206	57.99%
1986	P146 Papar, Sabah	Osu Sukam (USNO)	4,844	48.92%	Othman Mohd Yassin (IND)	421	4.25%	9,995	206	57.99%
1990	P146 Papar, Sabah	Osu Sukam (USNO)	8,452	51.22%	Abdul Rahman Juman (IND)	7,939	48.10%	16,613	513	71.80%
1990	P146 Papar, Sabah	Osu Sukam (USNO)	8,452	51.22%	Wenches B. Lajingah (IND)	45	0.27%	16,613	513	71.80%
1990	P146 Papar, Sabah	Osu Sukam (USNO)	8,452	51.22%	Md. Ariff Ab. Bakar (IND)	41	0.25%	16,613	513	71.80%
1990	P146 Papar, Sabah	Osu Sukam (USNO)	8,452	51.22%	Alexander Huang Tzin Tat (IND)	27	0.16%	16,613	513	71.80%
1995	P153 Papar, Sabah	Osu Sukam (UMNO)	12,131	56.68%	Johnny Mositun (PBS)	9,015	48.10%	21,607	3,116	74.94%
1995	P153 Papar, Sabah	Osu Sukam (UMNO)	12,131	56.68%	Mohd. Hashim Yussup (IND)	257	1.20%	21,607	3,116	74.94%
1999	P153 Papar, Sabah	Osu Sukam (UMNO)	14,013	64.81%	Mohd Saidi Lampoh (PBS)	7,608	35.19%	21,821	6,405	70.22%

Sabah State Legislative Assembly
Year	Constituency	Candidate	Votes	Pct	Opponent(s)	Votes	Pct	Ballots cast	Majority	Turnout
1981	N.. Kawang	Osu Sukam (USNO)	2,153		Fred Sinidol (BERJAYA)	2,976		5,444	823	84.74%
1981	N.. Kawang	Osu Sukam (USNO)	2,153		Patrit Sendu (PASOK)	222		5,444	823	84.74%
1985	N.. Kawang	Osu Sukam (USNO)	1,923		Wenches B. Lajingah (PBS)	2,122		5,239	199	81.63%
1985	N.. Kawang	Osu Sukam (USNO)	1,923		Fred Tokudung Sinidol (BERJAYA)	956		5,239	199	81.63%
1985	N.. Kawang	Osu Sukam (USNO)	1,923		Pengiran Othman Rauf @ Awang (BERSEPADU)	190		5,239	199	81.63%
1986	N11 Sulaman, P137 Tuaran	Osu Sukam (USNO)	2,913	45.65%	Muhammad Abd Rahman (PBS)	2,510	39.34%	6,437	403	76.71%
1986	N11 Sulaman, P137 Tuaran	Osu Sukam (USNO)	2,913	45.65%	Mungkit Ampuling (BERJAYA)	651	10.20%	6,437	403	76.71%
1986	N11 Sulaman, P137 Tuaran	Osu Sukam (USNO)	2,913	45.65%	Nawawi Budin (IND)	212	3.32%	6,437	403	76.71%
1986	N11 Sulaman, P137 Tuaran	Osu Sukam (USNO)	2,913	45.65%	Bigong Albert Polinoh (IND)	80	1.25%	6,437	403	76.71%
1986	N11 Sulaman, P137 Tuaran	Osu Sukam (USNO)	2,913	45.65%	A Tanjong Hakim (IND)	15	0.24%	6,437	403	76.71%
1994	N32 Kawang	Osu Sukam (UMNO)	4,699	49.53%	Irene Daphne Pritchard @ Ariah Tengku Ahmad (PBS)	4,635	48.84%	9,561	64	81.11%
1994	N32 Kawang	Osu Sukam (UMNO)	4,699	49.53%	Norbert Chin Chuan Siong (IND)	110	1.16%	9,561	64	81.11%
1994	N32 Kawang	Osu Sukam (UMNO)	4,699	49.53%	John Dagul (IND)	32	0.34%	9,561	64	81.11%
1994	N32 Kawang	Osu Sukam (UMNO)	4,699	49.53%	Duig Sumpang (IND)	12	0.13%	9,561	64	81.11%
1999	N32 Kawang	Osu Sukam (UMNO)	7,017	57.19%	Ariah Tengku Ahmad (PBS)	4,804	39.16%	12,354	2,213	79.92%
1999	N32 Kawang	Osu Sukam (UMNO)	7,017	57.19%	Mohd Kanit Omar (BERSEKUTU)	282	2.30%	12,354	2,213	79.92%
1999	N32 Kawang	Osu Sukam (UMNO)	7,017	57.19%	Pengiran Othman Rauf (SETIA)	117	0.95%	12,354	2,213	79.92%
1999	N32 Kawang	Osu Sukam (UMNO)	7,017	57.19%	Sajit Patrick Singh (IND)	49	0.40%	12,354	2,213	79.92%

== Controversy ==
=== Gambling debt ===
He resigned from his party of UMNO due to gambling debts totalling at least US$1.8 million he accumulated from Ritz Hotel Casino in London and another casino. The casino obtained a judgment in the High Court in England to recover debts owed by Osu. The casino sought to enforce the judgment in Malaysia by registering the judgment in the High Court of Sabah and Sarawak in July 2005. The High Court at Kota Kinabalu refused to register the judgment on grounds of public policy. However, in 2007, the Court of Appeal ruled in favour of the casino allowing the debt to be recovered.

== Honours ==
- Malaysia
  - Commander of the Order of Loyalty to the Crown of Malaysia (PSM) – Tan Sri (2022)
- Sabah
  - Grand Commander of the Order of Kinabalu (SPDK) – Datuk Seri Panglima (1997)
  - Commander of the Order of Kinabalu (PGDK) – Datuk (1994)
- Sarawak
  - Knight Commander of the Order of the Star of Hornbill Sarawak (DA) – Datuk Amar (1999)

Political offices
Preceded by Bernard Giluk Dompok	Chief Minister of Sabah; 1999–2001	Succeeded by Chong Kah Kiat
