= Azizah Mohd Dun =

Malaysian politician (born 1955)

Yang Berbahagia Datuk Seri Panglima Azizah Mohd Dun SPDK PGDK DIMP
- عزيزة محمد دون
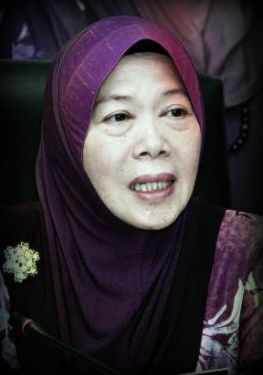

Deputy Minister of Women, Family and Community Development
- In office 16 May 2013 – 10 May 2018 Serving with Chew Mei Fun (2014–2018)
- Monarchs: Abdul Halim (2013–2016); Muhammad V (2016–2018)
- Prime Minister: Najib Razak
- Minister: Rohani Abdul Karim
- Preceded by: Heng Seai Kie
- Succeeded by: Hannah Yeow Tseow Suan
- Constituency: Beaufort

Deputy Minister of Housing and Local Government
- In office 27 March 2004 – 18 March 2008 Serving with Robert Lau Hoi Chew
- Monarchs: Sirajuddin (2004–2006); Mizan Zainal Abidin (2006–2008)
- Prime Minister: Abdullah Ahmad Badawi
- Minister: Ong Ka Ting
- Preceded by: Peter Chin Fah Kui
- Succeeded by: Hamzah Zainudin
- Constituency: Beaufort

Member of the Malaysian Parliament for Beaufort
- In office 5 May 2013 – 19 November 2022
- Preceded by: Lajim Ukin (Independent)
- Succeeded by: Siti Aminah Aching (BN–UMNO)
- Majority: 5,336 (2013); 6,647 (2018)
- In office 21 March 2004 – 8 March 2008
- Preceded by: Anifah Aman (BN–UMNO)
- Succeeded by: Lajim Ukin (BN–UMNO)
- Majority: Walkover (2004)

State Minister of Community Development and Consumer Affairs of Sabah
- In office 2008–2013
- Governor: Ahmadshah Abdullah (2008–2011); Juhar Mahiruddin (2011–2013)
- Chief Minister: Musa Aman
- Constituency: Klias

Member of the Sabah State Legislative Assembly for Klias
- In office 8 March 2008 – 5 May 2013
- Preceded by: Lajim Ukin (BN–UMNO)
- Succeeded by: Lajim Ukin (PR–PKR)
- Majority: 2,413 (2008)

Chairperson of the Majlis Amanah Rakyat
- In office 1 May 2020 – 15 December 2022
- Minister: Abdul Latiff Ahmad (2020–2021); Mahdzir Khalid (2021–2022); Ahmad Zahid Hamidi (2022)
- Director-General: Azhar Abdul Manaf
- Preceded by: Hasnita Hashim
- Succeeded by: Asyraf Wajdi Dusuki

Deputy Chairperson of the Public Accounts Committee
- In office 27 August 2020 – 10 October 2022
- Nominated by: Muhyiddin Yassin
- Appointed by: Azhar Azizan Harun
- Chairman: Wong Kah Woh
- Preceded by: Wong Kah Woh
- Succeeded by: Wong Shu Qi
- Constituency: Beaufort

Chairperson of the Special Select Committee on Fundamental Liberty and Constitutional Rights
- In office 5 November 2021 – 19 November 2022
- Preceded by: Position established

Faction represented in Dewan Rakyat
- 2004–2008: Barisan Nasional
- 2013–2018: Barisan Nasional
- 2018–2019: Independent
- 2019–2020: Pakatan Harapan
- 2020–2022: Malaysian United Indigenous Party
- 2020–2022: Perikatan Nasional

Faction represented in the Sabah State Legislative Assembly
- 2008–2013: Barisan Nasional

Faction represented in Dewan Negara
- 2000–2004: Barisan Nasional

Personal details
- Born: Azizah binti Mohd Dun; 27 March 1955 (age 71) Beaufort, Crown Colony of North Borneo
- Citizenship: Malaysia
- Party: United Malays National Organisation (UMNO) (until 2018); Independent (2018–2019); Malaysian United Indigenous Party (BERSATU) (2019–2022); Parti Gagasan Rakyat Sabah (GAGASAN) (since 2023)
- Other political affiliations: Barisan Nasional (BN) (until 2018); Pakatan Harapan (PH) (2019–2020); Perikatan Nasional (PN) (2020–2022); Gabungan Rakyat Sabah (GRS) (since 2020)
- Spouse: Paiman Karim
- Occupation: Politician

Azizah binti Mohd Dun (Jawi: عزيزة بنت محمد دون; born 27 March 1955) is a Malaysian politician who served as Chairperson of the Majlis Amanah Rakyat (MARA) from May 2020 to December 2022 and of the Special Select Committee on Fundamental Liberty and Constitutional Rights from November 2021 to November 2022, Deputy Chairperson of the Public Accounts Committee (PAC) from August 2020 to October 2022, the Deputy Minister of Women, Family and Community Development and Deputy Minister of Housing and Local Government in the Barisan Nasional (BN) administration under former Prime Ministers Najib Razak and Abdullah Ahmad Badawi as well as former Ministers Rohani Abdul Karim and Ong Ka Ting from May 2013 to May 2018 and from March 2004 to March 2008 respectively. She also served as the State Minister of Community Development and Consumer Affairs of Sabah in the BN state administration under former Chief Minister Musa Aman from 2008 to 2013. In addition, she served as the Member of Parliament (MP) for Beaufort from March 2004 to March 2008 and again from May 2013 to November 2022, Member of the Sabah State Legislative Assembly (MLA) for Klias from March 2008 to May 2013 as well as a Senator from 2000 to 2004. She is a member of the Parti Gagasan Rakyat Sabah (GAGASAN), a component party of the Gabungan Rakyat Sabah (GRS), was a member of the Malaysian United Indigenous Party (BERSATU), a component party of the Perikatan Nasional (PN) as well as formerly Pakatan Harapan (PH) opposition coalitions and was a member of the United Malays National Organisation (UMNO), a component party of the BN coalition. She left UMNO to be an independent in 2018 and later joined BERSATU in 2019 until 2022, and become official member of GAGASAN in 2023 after she left BERSATU in December 2022. She was officially appointed as Women Chief of GRS since 2023 after the Annual General Meeting (AGM) of GRS in March 2023.

== Personal life ==
Azizah was born in the town of Beaufort on 27 March 1955. She is married to Paiman Karim. In 2012, she was involved in a car accident but survived with slight injuries while her bodyguard and driver were seriously injured.

== Political career ==
=== Fight against child and women abuse ===
Azizah strongly opposed child and women abuse. During her candidacy, she organised seminar, talks and action plans to combat domestic crimes involving children and women. She frequently alerted the Malaysian society on the rise of child abuses cases and strongly urged the crimes must be stopped. She also added that children and women should not be subjected to domestic or any kind of violence. Azizah is one of the leader who initiated the state committee to co-ordinate women's activity in line with the country 1Malaysia program.

=== Support for the disabled ===
Azizah is also the supporter for disabled people to be given more aid, moreover following her tragic car accident in 2012 that left her own bodyguard amputated. In 2010, she applaud Kota Kinabalu City Hall Mayor Iliyas Ibrahim for providing more facility to people who have special needs. According to her, the movement made by the Mayor "have been a good contribution to the state".

== Elections ==
=== 2013 general election ===
In the 2013 election, Azizah faced Lajim Ukin, a former United Malays National Organisation (UMNO) strongman who had leaped to People's Justice Party (PKR). Azizah was the seat holder for Klias. She changed her seat candidacy to be able to face off her former colleague in the Beaufort parliamentary seat.

=== 2018 general election ===
Before the 2018 election, Azizah said she support whoever is the selected candidate for their party even if she is not selected. Prior to the election, she was selected again to representing the Beaufort parliamentary seat and won.

== Election results ==
Parliament of Malaysia
Year	Constituency	Candidate	Votes	Pct	Opponent(s)	Votes	Pct	Ballots cast	Majority	Turnout
2004	P177 Beaufort	Azizah Mohd Dun (UMNO)	Unopposed							
2013	P177 Beaufort	Azizah Mohd Dun (UMNO)	12,827	50.52%	Lajim Ukin (PKR)	12,154	47.87%	26,000	673	86.39%
2013	P177 Beaufort	Azizah Mohd Dun (UMNO)	12,827	50.52%	Guan Dee Koh Hoi (STAR)	409	1.61%	26,000	673	86.39%
2018	P177 Beaufort	Azizah Mohd Dun (UMNO)	11,354	41.72%	Lajim Ukin (PHRS)	8,023	29.48%	28,154	3,331	84.44%
2018	P177 Beaufort	Azizah Mohd Dun (UMNO)	11,354	41.72%	Johan @ Christopher Ot Ghani (PKR)	7,835	28.79%	28,154	3,331	84.44%

Sabah State Legislative Assembly
Year	Constituency	Candidate	Votes	Pct	Opponent(s)	Votes	Pct	Ballots cast	Majority	Turnout
1986	N36 Klias	Azizah Mohd Dun (USNO)	2,652	47.36%	Lajim Ukin (PBS)	2,749	49.09%	5,670	97	74.55%
1986	N36 Klias	Azizah Mohd Dun (USNO)	2,652	47.36%	Empih Godfrey Eigur (BERJAYA)	199	3.55%	5,670	97	74.55%
1990	N36 Klias	Azizah Mohd Dun (USNO)	2,888	41.11%	Lajim Ukin (PBS)	3,679	52.36%	7,102	791	78.49%
1990	N36 Klias	Azizah Mohd Dun (USNO)	2,888	41.11%	Loi Siang Tong (BERJAYA)	348	4.95%	7,102	791	78.49%
1990	N36 Klias	Azizah Mohd Dun (USNO)	2,888	41.11%	Duin Banang (AKAR)	111	1.58%	7,102	791	78.49%
2008	N25 Klias	Azizah Mohd Dun (UMNO)	5,900	61.36%	Abdul Rahman Md Yakub (PKR)	3,487	36.28%	9,976	2,413	71.90%
2008	N25 Klias	Azizah Mohd Dun (UMNO)	5,900	61.36%	Tuafick Ruschi (IND)	109	1.13%	9,976	2,413	71.90%
2008	N25 Klias	Azizah Mohd Dun (UMNO)	5,900	61.36%	Md. Tajuddin Md. Walli (IND)	82	0.85%	9,976	2,413	71.90%
2008	N25 Klias	Azizah Mohd Dun (UMNO)	5,900	61.36%	Mat Lani Sabli (IND)	37	0.38%	9,976	2,413	71.90%

== Honours ==
- Pahang
  - Knight Companion of the Order of the Crown of Pahang (DIMP) – Dato' (2003)
- Sabah
  - Grand Commander of the Order of Kinabalu (SPDK) – Datuk Seri Panglima (2021)
  - Commander of the Order of Kinabalu (PGDK) – Datuk (2009)

== See also ==
- Members of the Dewan Negara, 10th Malaysian Parliament
- List of people who have served in both Houses of the Malaysian Parliament
