= Limus Jury =

Malaysian politician (born 1962)

Yang Berhormat Datuk Limus Jury PGDK MLA

State Assistant Minister of Works and Utilities of Sabah
- Incumbent
- Assumed office 2 December 2025 Serving with Ruddy Awah
- Minister: Joachim Gunsalam
- Governor: Musa Aman
- Chief Minister: Hajiji Noor
- Preceded by: himself (as State Assistant Minister of Works of Sabah)
- Constituency: Kuala Penyu

State Assistant Minister of Works of Sabah
- In office 8 October 2020 – 30 November 2025 Serving with Robert Tawik
- Minister: Bung Moktar Radin (2020–2023); Shahelmey Yahya (2023–2025)
- Governor: Juhar Mahiruddin (2020–2024); Musa Aman (2025)
- Chief Minister: Hajiji Noor
- Preceded by: Muis Picho (as State Assistant Minister of Infrastructure Development of Sabah)
- Succeeded by: himself (as State Assistant Minister of Works and Utilities of Sabah)
- Constituency: Kuala Penyu

Member of the Sabah State Legislative Assembly for Kuala Penyu
- Incumbent
- Assumed office 5 May 2013
- Preceded by: Teo Kwan Chin @ Teo Mau Sing (BN–UPKO)
- Majority: 2,273 (2013); 3,545 (2018); 3,273 (2020); 3,965 (2025)

Faction represented in the Sabah State Legislative Assembly
- 2013–2018: Barisan Nasional
- 2018–2019: United Pasokmomogun Kadazandusun Murut Organisation
- 2019–2020: United Progressive Kinabalu Organisation
- 2020: Independent
- 2020–2022: Perikatan Nasional
- 2022–: Gabungan Rakyat Sabah

Personal details
- Born: Limus bin Jury; 24 July 1961 (age 64) Kuala Penyu, Crown Colony of North Borneo
- Party: United Progressive Kinabalu Organisation (UPKO) (until 2020); Malaysian United Indigenous Party of Sabah (Sabah BERSATU) (2019–2022); Parti Gagasan Rakyat Sabah (GAGASAN) (since 2023)
- Other political affiliations: Barisan Nasional (BN) (until 2018); Perikatan Nasional (PN) (2020–2022); Gabungan Rakyat Sabah (GRS) (since 2020)
- Spouse: Tracy Tan Mui Jee @ Tan Jee Huat
- Occupation: Politician

Limus bin Jury (born 24 July 1961) is a Malaysian politician who has served as State Assistant Minister of Works and Utilities of Sabah in the Gabungan Rakyat Sabah (GRS) state administration under Chief Minister Hajiji Noor and Minister Joachim Gunsalam since December 2025 and State Assistant Minister of Works of Sabah under Ministers Bung Moktar Radin and Shahelmey Yahya from October 2020 until November 2025, as well as Member of the Sabah State Legislative Assembly (MLA) for Kuala Penyu since May 2013. He is a member of the Parti Gagasan Rakyat Sabah (GAGASAN), a component party of the GRS coalition.

== Election results ==
Sabah State Legislative Assembly
Year	Constituency	Candidate	Votes	Pct	Opponent(s)	Votes	Pct	Ballots cast	Majority	Turnout
2013	N26 Kuala Penyu	Limus Jury (UPKO)	7,311	57.84%	Johan Christopher Ghani (PKR)	5,038	39.86%	12,889	2,273	87.50%
2013	N26 Kuala Penyu	Limus Jury (UPKO)	7,311	57.84%	Ining Sinten (STAR)	154	1.22%	12,889	2,273	87.50%
2013	N26 Kuala Penyu	Limus Jury (UPKO)	7,311	57.84%	Md. Tajuddin Md. Walli (IND)	92	0.73%	12,889	2,273	87.50%
2013	N26 Kuala Penyu	Limus Jury (UPKO)	7,311	57.84%	Jusbian Kenneth (IND)	44	0.35%	12,889	2,273	87.50%
2018	N26 Kuala Penyu	Limus Jury (UPKO)	7,352	52.31%	Dikin Musah (PKR)	3,807	31.35%	14,056	3,545	85.70%
2018	N26 Kuala Penyu	Limus Jury (UPKO)	7,352	52.31%	Jonas Sungin (PHRS)	1,749	12.44%	14,056	3,545	85.70%
2018	N26 Kuala Penyu	Limus Jury (UPKO)	7,352	52.31%	Nikol Tiunsu (PCS)	548	3.90%	14,056	3,545	85.70%
2020	N33 Kuala Penyu	Limus Jury (Sabah BERSATU)	6,256	49.56%	Nelson W. Angang (UPKO)	2,983	23.82%	12,589	3,273	76.78%
2020	N33 Kuala Penyu	Limus Jury (Sabah BERSATU)	6,256	49.56%	Mohd Fadzlee Lee Abdullah (IND)	2,947	23.41%	12,589	3,273	76.78%
2020	N33 Kuala Penyu	Limus Jury (Sabah BERSATU)	6,256	49.56%	Cecilia Jompiuh (PCS)	181	1.44%	12,589	3,273	76.78%
2020	N33 Kuala Penyu	Limus Jury (Sabah BERSATU)	6,256	49.56%	Jepri Mapat (LDP)	138	1.10%	12,589	3,273	76.78%
2020	N33 Kuala Penyu	Limus Jury (Sabah BERSATU)	6,256	49.56%	Parijik @ Fredzex Bagang (GAGASAN)	84	0.67%	12,589	3,273	76.78%
2025	N33 Kuala Penyu	Limus Jury (GAGASAN)	8,633	53.52%	Awang Aslee Lakat (Sabah UMNO)	4,668	28.94%	16,414	3,965	73.70%
2025	N33 Kuala Penyu	Limus Jury (GAGASAN)	8,633	53.52%	Walther Philip Michael (STAR)	1,346	8.34%	16,414	3,965	73.70%
2025	N33 Kuala Penyu	Limus Jury (GAGASAN)	8,633	53.52%	Monih Epin (WARISAN)	1,199	7.43%	16,414	3,965	73.70%
2025	N33 Kuala Penyu	Limus Jury (GAGASAN)	8,633	53.52%	Jonehtan Matheus (PKS)	159	0.99%	16,414	3,965	73.70%
2025	N33 Kuala Penyu	Limus Jury (GAGASAN)	8,633	53.52%	Dini Ginsik @ Annie (IMPIAN)	125	0.77%	16,414	3,965	73.70%

== Honours ==
- Sabah
  - Commander of the Order of Kinabalu (PGDK) – Datuk (2017)
  - Companion of the Order of Kinabalu (ASDK) (2015)
