= Kuala Penyu (state constituency) =

State constituency in Sabah, Malaysia

Kuala Penyu (N33)
Sabah constituency

State constituency
- Legislature: Sabah State Legislative Assembly
MLA
Limus Jury
GRS
- Constituency created: 1967
- First contested: 1967
- Last contested: 2025

Demographics
- Electors (2025): 22,288

Kuala Penyu is a state constituency in Sabah, Malaysia, that is represented in the Sabah State Legislative Assembly.

== Demographics ==
As of 2020, Kuala Penyu has a population of 23,710 people.

Ethnic breakdown of Kuala Penyu's electorate as of 2025
1. Muslim Bumiputera (56.0%)
2. Non-Muslim Bumiputera (37.0%)
3. Chinese (7.00%)
4. Other ethnicities (0.00%)

== History ==
=== Polling districts ===
According to the gazette issued on 31 October 2022, the Kuala Penyu constituency has a total of 12 polling districts.

State constituency	Polling District	Code	Location
Kuala Penyu (N33)	Tenambak	177/33/01	SK Tenambak
Kuala Penyu (N33)	Temporong	177/33/02	SK St. Augustine
Kuala Penyu (N33)	Sitombok	177/33/03	SJK (C) Chung Hwa
Kuala Penyu (N33)	Palu Palu	177/33/04	SK Palu-Palu
Kuala Penyu (N33)	Bundu	177/33/05	SK St. Peter Bundu
Kuala Penyu (N33)	Melampai	177/33/06	SK Menunggang
Kuala Penyu (N33)	Mansud	177/33/07	SK Mansud
Kuala Penyu (N33)	Karukan	177/33/08	SK Kerukan
Kuala Penyu (N33)	Kilugus	177/33/09	SK Kilugus
Kuala Penyu (N33)	Tanjung Aru	177/33/10	SK Tanjung Aru
Kuala Penyu (N33)	Malikai	177/33/11	SK Melikai
Kuala Penyu (N33)	Menumbok	177/33/12	SK Pekan Menumbok

=== Representation history ===
Member of Sabah State Legislative Assembly for Kuala Penyu
Assembly	No	Years	Member	Party
Constituency created
3rd	N14	1967 – 1971	Fadzil Wong Fook Siang (黄福祥)	UPKO
4th	N14	1971 – 1976	Fadzil Wong Fook Siang (黄福祥)	Alliance (USNO)
5th	N33	1976	Fadzil Wong Fook Siang (黄福祥)	BERJAYA
5th	N33	1976 – 1981	Fadzil Wong Fook Siang (黄福祥)	BN (BERJAYA)
6th	N33	1981 – 1985	Rashiddin Hatt Bulanggung	BN (BERJAYA)
7th	N35	1985 – 1986	Johan Ghani	USNO
8th	N35	1986 – 1990	Wences Angang	PBS
9th	N35	1990 – 1994	Wences Angang	GR (PBS)
10th	N35	1994	Wences Angang	GR (PBS)
10th	N35	1994 – 1999	Wences Angang	BN (PDS)
11th	N21	1999 – 2004	Wences Angang	BN (UPKO)
12th	N26	2004 – 2008	Johan Ghani	Independent
13th	N26	2008 – 2013	Teo Mau Sing (张茂盛)	BN (UPKO)
14th	N26	2013 – 2018	Limus Jury	BN (UPKO)
15th	N26	2018	Limus Jury	BN (UPKO)
15th	N26	2018 – 2020	Limus Jury	UPKO
15th	N26	2020	Limus Jury	Independent
15th	N26	2020	Limus Jury	GRS (BERSATU)
16th	N33	2020 – 2022	Limus Jury	GRS (BERSATU)
16th	N33	2022 - 2023	Limus Jury	GRS (Direct)
16th	N33	2023–2025	Limus Jury	GRS (GAGASAN)
17th	N33	2025–present	Limus Jury	GRS (GAGASAN)

== Election results ==
Sabah state election, 2025
Party	Candidate	Votes	%	∆%
GRS	Limus Jury	8,633	53.52	▲53.52
BN	Awang Aslee Lakat	4,668	28.94	▲28.94
Homeland Solidarity Party	Walter Philip Michael	1,346	8.34	▲8.34
Heritage	Monih Epin	1,199	7.43	▲7.43
Sabah Nationality Party	Jonethan Matheus	159	0.99	▲0.99
Sabah Dream Party	Dini Ginsik	125	0.77	▲0.77
Total valid votes		16,130		
Total rejected ballots		284		
Unreturned ballots		13		
Turnout		16,427	73.70	▼4.54
Registered electors		22,288		
Majority		3,965	24.58	▼0.93
GRS gain from PN		Swing		-
Source(s) "RESULTS OF CONTESTED ELECTION AND STATEMENTS OF THE POLL AFTER THE OFFICIAL ADDITION OF VOTES" (PDF).

Sabah state election, 2020
Party	Candidate	Votes	%	∆%
PN	Limus Jury	6,256	48.76	▲48.76
UPKO	Nelson Angang	2,983	23.25	▲23.25
Independent	Mohd Fadzlee Lee Abdullah	2,947	22.97	▲22.97
Love Sabah Party	Cecilia Jompiuh	181	1.41	▼2.49
LDP	Jepri Mapat	138	1.08	▲1.08
GAGASAN	Parijik @ Fredzex Bagang	19	0.15	▲0.15
Total valid votes		12,589	98.13	
Total rejected ballots		215	1.68	
Unreturned ballots		25	0.12	
Turnout		12,829	78.24	▼7.50
Registered electors		16,396		
Majority		3,273	25.51	▲0.28
PN gain from BN		Swing		-
Source(s) "RESULTS OF CONTESTED ELECTION AND STATEMENTS OF THE POLL AFTER THE OFFICIAL ADDITION OF VOTES".

Sabah state election, 2018
Party	Candidate	Votes	%	∆%
BN	Limus Jury	7,352	52.31	▼4.30
PKR	Dikin Musah	3,807	27.08	▼11.93
Sabah People's Hope Party	Jonas Sungin @ Sunggim	1,749	12.44	▲12.44
Love Sabah Party	Nikol Tiunsul @ Herman Tiongsoh	548	3.90	▲3.90
Total valid votes		13,456	95.73	
Total rejected ballots		439	3.12	
Unreturned ballots		161	1.15	
Turnout		14,056	85.74	▼1.76
Registered electors		16,394		
Majority		3,545	25.23	▲7.63
BN hold		Swing		
Source(s) "RESULTS OF CONTESTED ELECTION AND STATEMENTS OF THE POLL AFTER THE OFFICIAL ADDITION OF VOTES".

Sabah state election, 2013
Party	Candidate	Votes	%	∆%
BN	Limus Jury	7,311	56.61	▲11.48
PKR	Johan Ghani	5,038	39.01	▲29.92
STAR	Ining Sinten @ Alexander Sintin	154	1.19	▲1.19
Independent	Mohd Tajuddin Mohd Walli	92	0.71	▲0.71
Independent	Jusbian Kenneth	44	0.34	▲0.34
Total valid votes		12,639	97.86	
Total rejected ballots		250	1.16	
Unreturned ballots		26	0.20	
Turnout		12,915	87.50	▲11.67
Registered electors		14,759		
Majority		2,273	17.60	▲14.98
BN hold		Swing		
Source(s) "KEPUTUSAN PILIHAN RAYA UMUM DEWAN UNDANGAN NEGERI". Archived from the original on 2022-07-09.

Sabah state election, 2008
Party	Candidate	Votes	%	∆%
BN	Teo Kwan Chin @ Teo Mau Sing	4,416	45.13	▲11.51
Independent	Johan Ghani	4,159	42.51	▼12.72
PKR	Guan Dee Koh Hoi	889	9.09	▲9.09
Total valid votes		9,464	96.73	
Total rejected ballots		306	3.13	
Unreturned ballots		14	0.14	
Turnout		9,784	75.83	▲1.49
Registered electors		12,903		
Majority		257	2.62	▼18.99
BN gain from Independent		Swing		?
Source(s) "KEPUTUSAN PILIHAN RAYA UMUM DEWAN UNDANGAN NEGERI SABAH BAGI TAHUN 2008".

Sabah state election, 2004
Party	Candidate	Votes	%	∆%
Independent	Johan Ghani	5,157	55.23	▲55.23
BN	Wences Angang	3,139	33.62	▼17.45
Independent	Saman Ahmad	633	6.78	▲6.78
SETIA	Guan Dee Koh Hoi	308	3.30	▲3.30
Total valid votes		9,237	98.92	
Total rejected ballots		101	1.08	
Unreturned ballots		0	0.00	
Turnout		9,338	74.34	▼6.09
Registered electors		12,562		
Majority		2,018	21.61	▲12.50
Independent gain from BN		Swing		?
Source(s) "KEPUTUSAN PILIHAN RAYA UMUM DEWAN UNDANGAN NEGERI SABAH BAGI TAHUN 2004".

Sabah state election, 1999
Party	Candidate	Votes	%	∆%
BN	Wences Anggang	4,956	51.07	▲4.19
PBS	Marcellinus Augustine Piong	4,072	41.96	▼9.58
BERSEKUTU	Awang Hashim Awang Gador	468	4.82	▲4.82
Independent	Mohd Tajuddin Mohd Walli	59	0.61	▲0.61
Independent	Asmat Misrin	10	0.10	▲0.10
Total valid votes		9,565	98.56	
Total rejected ballots		140	1.44	
Unreturned ballots		0	0.00	
Turnout		9,705	80.43	▼1.55
Registered electors		12,066		
Majority		884	9.11	▲4.45
BN gain from PBS		Swing		?
Source(s) "KEPUTUSAN PILIHAN RAYA UMUM DEWAN UNDANGAN NEGERI SABAH BAGI TAHUN 1999".

Sabah state election, 1994
Party	Candidate	Votes	%	∆%
PBS	Wences Anggang	4,430	51.54	▼0.53
BN	Mohd Zahari Mohd Zinin	4,030	46.88	▲46.88
Independent	Ismail Salleh	51	0.59	▲0.59
Total valid votes		8,511	99.01	
Total rejected ballots		85	0.99	
Unreturned ballots		0	0.00	
Turnout		8,596	81.98	▼2.85
Registered electors		10,486		
Majority		400	4.66	▼9.20
PBS hold		Swing		
Source(s) "KEPUTUSAN PILIHAN RAYA UMUM DEWAN UNDANGAN NEGERI SABAH BAGI TAHUN 1994".

Sabah state election, 1990
Party	Candidate	Votes	%	∆%
PBS	Wences Anggang	3,730	52.07	▼1.76
USNO	Johan Ghani	2,737	38.21	▼6.40
BERSEKUTU	Awang Damit Awang Othman	311	4.34	▲4.34
PRS	Awang Maslin Mohd Hashim	163	2.28	▲2.28
AKAR	Engkuan Eyong	129	1.80	▲1.80
Total valid votes		7,070	98.70	
Total rejected ballots		93	1.30	
Unreturned ballots		0	0.00	
Turnout		7,163	84.83	▲4.13
Registered electors		8,444		
Majority		993	13.86	▲4.64
PBS hold		Swing		
Source(s) "KEPUTUSAN PILIHAN RAYA UMUM DEWAN UNDANGAN NEGERI SABAH BAGI TAHUN 1990".

Sabah state election, 1986
Party	Candidate	Votes	%	∆%
PBS	Wences Anggang	3,152	54.68	▲20.05
USNO	Johan Ghani	2,612	45.32	▲7.65
Total valid votes		5,764	100.00	
Total rejected ballots		91		
Unreturned ballots		0		
Turnout		5,855	80.70	▲0.03
Registered electors		7,255		
Majority		540	9.37	▲6.33
PBS gain from USNO		Swing		?
Source(s) "KEPUTUSAN PILIHAN RAYA UMUM DEWAN UNDANGAN NEGERI SABAH BAGI TAHUN 1986".

Sabah state election, 1985
Party	Candidate	Votes	%	∆%
USNO	Johan Ghani	1,934	37.67	▼2.73
PBS	Wences Angang	1,778	34.63	▲34.63
BERJAYA	Nurnikman Abdullah	1,251	24.37	▼35.23
BERSEPADU	Rakbi Lukin	171	3.33	▲3.33
Total valid votes		5,134	100.00	
Total rejected ballots		92		
Unreturned ballots		0		
Turnout		5,226	80.67	▼2.96
Registered electors		6,478		
Majority		156	3.04	▼16.16
USNO gain from BERJAYA		Swing		-

Sabah state election, 1981
Party	Candidate	Votes	%	∆%
BERJAYA	OKK Rashid Din Hatt	2,207	59.60	▲17.62
USNO	Johan Ghani	1,496	40.40	▼8.14
Total valid votes		3,703	100.00	
Total rejected ballots		92		
Unreturned ballots		0		
Turnout		3,795	83.63	▼6.98
Registered electors		4,538		
Majority		711	19.20	▲12.64
BERJAYA gain from USNO		Swing		-

Sabah state election, 1976
Party	Candidate	Votes	%	∆%
USNO	Fadzil Wong Fook Siang	1,568	48.54	
BERJAYA	Sumi Bhatt	1,356	41.98	
Independent	Dirih Sebastian Anjim	306	9.47	
Total valid votes		3,230	100.00	
Total rejected ballots		91		
Unreturned ballots		0		
Turnout		3,321	90.61	
Registered electors		3,665		
Majority		212	6.56	
USNO hold		Swing		

Sabah state election, 1971
Party	Candidate	Votes	%	∆%
On the nomination day, Fadzil Wong Fook Siang won uncontested.
USNO	Fadzil Wong Fook Siang			
Total valid votes				
Total rejected ballots				
Unreturned ballots				
Turnout				
Registered electors		0		
Majority				
USNO gain from UPKO		Swing		?

Sabah state election, 1967
Party	Candidate	Votes	%
UPKO	Fadzil Wong Fook Siang	3,289	54.24
USNO	Awang Thaufeck	2,775	45.76
Total valid votes		6,064	100.00
Total rejected ballots		110	
Unreturned ballots		0	
Turnout		6,174	94.52
Registered electors		6,532	
Majority		514	8.48
This was a new constituency created
