= Isnin Aliasnih =

Malaysian politician (born 1966)

Yang Berhormat Datuk Isnin Aliasnih PGDK AMN MLA
- إثنين ألياسنيه

State Assistant Minister to the Chief Minister of Sabah
- Incumbent
- Assumed office 2 December 2025 Serving with Joniston Bangkuai & Ceasar Mandela Malakun
- Governor: Musa Aman
- Chief Minister: Hajiji Noor
- Preceded by: Nizam Abu Bakar Titingan
- Constituency: Klias

State Assistant Minister of Housing and Local Government of Sabah
- In office 8 October 2020 – 30 November 2025 Serving with Mohamad Hamsan Awang Supain (until January 2025)
- Governor: Juhar Mahiruddin (2020–2025); Musa Aman (2025)
- Chief Minister: Hajiji Noor
- Minister: Masidi Manjun (2020–2023); Joachim Gunsalam (2023–2025)
- Preceded by: George Hiew Vun Zin
- Succeeded by: Fairuz Renddan & Maijol Mahap
- Constituency: Klias

Member of the Sabah State Legislative Assembly for Klias
- Incumbent
- Assumed office 9 May 2018
- Preceded by: Lajim Ukin (PR–PKR)
- Majority: 2,336 (2018); 3,901 (2020); 1,643 (2025)

Faction represented in the Sabah State Legislative Assembly
- 2018: Barisan Nasional
- 2018–2019: Independent
- 2019–2020: Pakatan Harapan
- 2020: Malaysian United Indigenous Party of Sabah
- 2020–2022: Perikatan Nasional
- 2022–: Gabungan Rakyat Sabah

Personal details
- Born: Isnin bin Aliasnih @ Liasnih; 1 July 1966 (age 59) Beaufort, Sabah, Malaysia
- Party: United Malays National Organisation of Sabah (Sabah UMNO) (until 2018); Malaysian United Indigenous Party of Sabah (Sabah BERSATU) (2019–2022); Independent (2022–2023); Parti Gagasan Rakyat Sabah (GAGASAN) (since 2023)
- Other political affiliations: Barisan Nasional (BN) (until 2018); Pakatan Harapan (PH) (2019–2020); Perikatan Nasional (PN) (2020–2022); Gabungan Rakyat Sabah (GRS) (since 2020)
- Spouse: Faridah Mohd Ismail
- Occupation: Politician

Isnin bin Aliasnih (born 1 July 1966) is a Malaysian politician who has served as State Assistant Minister to the Chief Minister of Sabah in the Gabungan Rakyat Sabah (GRS) coalition under Chief Minister Hajiji Noor since December 2025 and State Assistant Minister of Housing and Local Government of Sabah in the Gabungan Rakyat Sabah (GRS) coalition under Chief Minister Hajiji Noor and Ministers Masidi Manjun and Joachim Gunsalam from October 2020 until November 2025, as well as Member of the Sabah State Legislative Assembly (MLA) for Klias since May 2018. He is a member of the Parti Gagasan Rakyat Sabah (GAGASAN), a component party of the GRS coalition and was a member of the Malaysian United Indigenous Party of Sabah (Sabah BERSATU), branch of a component party of the Perikatan Nasional (PN) and formerly GRS coalitions and also formerly a member of the United Malays National Organisation of Sabah (Sabah UMNO), branch of a component party of the Barisan Nasional (BN) coalitions.

== Election results ==
Sabah State Legislative Assembly
Year	Constituency	Candidate	Votes	Pct	Opponent(s)	Votes	Pct	Ballots cast	Majority	Turnout
2013	N25 Klias	Isnin Aliasnih (Sabah UMNO)	6,145	48.30%	Lajim Ukin (PKR)	6,324	49.71%	13,064	179	85.30%
2013	N25 Klias	Isnin Aliasnih (Sabah UMNO)	6,145	48.30%	Mohd Sanusi Taripin (SAPP)	182	1.43%	13,064	179	85.30%
2013	N25 Klias	Isnin Aliasnih (Sabah UMNO)	6,145	48.30%	Aliapa Osman (STAR)	71	0.56%	13,064	179	85.30%
2018	N25 Klias	Isnin Aliasnih (Sabah UMNO)	6,173	44.94%	Lajim Ukin (PHRS)	3,837	27.94%	14,187	2,336	83.70%
2018	N25 Klias	Isnin Aliasnih (Sabah UMNO)	6,173	44.94%	Johair Mat Lani (WARISAN)	3,725	27.12%	14,187	2,336	83.70%
2020	N32 Klias	Isnin Aliasnih (Sabah BERSATU)	6,711	59.90%	Abdul Rahman Md Yakub (PKR)	2,810	25.08%	11,203	3,901	66.27%
2020	N32 Klias	Isnin Aliasnih (Sabah BERSATU)	6,711	59.90%	Abdullah Okin (PCS)	1,419	12.67%	11,203	3,901	66.27%
2020	N32 Klias	Isnin Aliasnih (Sabah BERSATU)	6,711	59.90%	Asmir Dani (USNO Baru)	122	1.09%	11,203	3,901	66.27%
2020	N32 Klias	Isnin Aliasnih (Sabah BERSATU)	6,711	59.90%	Jismit Japong (IND)	86	0.77%	11,203	3,901	66.27%
2020	N32 Klias	Isnin Aliasnih (Sabah BERSATU)	6,711	59.90%	Maksit Saidi (GAGASAN)	55	0.49%	11,203	3,901	66.27%
2025	N32 Klias	Isnin Aliasnih (GAGASAN)	6,078	40.01%	Osin Jilon (Sabah UMNO)	4,435	29.19	15,478	1,643	69.57%
2025	N32 Klias	Isnin Aliasnih (GAGASAN)	6,078	40.01%	Mohd Shaid Othman (WARISAN)	2,808	18.48	15,478	1,643	69.57%
2025	N32 Klias	Isnin Aliasnih (GAGASAN)	6,078	40.01%	Mohd Hisyam Hazaril Mohd Azman(Sabah BERSATU)	877	5.77	15,478	1,643	69.57%
2025	N32 Klias	Isnin Aliasnih (GAGASAN)	6,078	40.01%	Mohd Ariffin Barhim (KDM)	557	3.67	15,478	1,643	69.57%
2025	N32 Klias	Isnin Aliasnih (GAGASAN)	6,078	40.01%	Jismit Japong (ANAK NEGERI)	178	1.17	15,478	1,643	69.57%
2025	N32 Klias	Isnin Aliasnih (GAGASAN)	6,078	40.01%	Matlani Sabli (IMPIAN)	124	0.82	15,478	1,643	69.57%
2025	N32 Klias	Isnin Aliasnih (GAGASAN)	6,078	40.01%	Edwin Louis (IND)	70	0.46	15,478	1,643	69.57%
2025	N32 Klias	Isnin Aliasnih (GAGASAN)	6,078	40.01%	Kaliwon Edi (PPRS)	66	0.43	15,478	1,643	69.57%

== Honours ==
=== Honours of Malaysia ===
- Malaysia
  - Officer of the Order of the Defender of the Realm (KMN) (2012)
  - Member of the Order of the Defender of the Realm (AMN) (2006)
- Sabah
  - Commander of the Order of Kinabalu (PGDK) – Datuk (2014)
