= Siti Aminah Aching =

Malaysian politician

Yang Berhormat Datuk Hajah Siti Aminah Aching PGDK ADK MP
- سيتي أمينة أچيڠ

Deputy Minister of Plantation and Commodities
- In office 10 December 2022 – 12 December 2023
- Monarch: Abdullah
- Prime Minister: Anwar Ibrahim
- Minister: Fadillah Yusof
- Preceded by: Wee Jeck Seng (Deputy Minister of Plantation Industries and Commodities I); Willie Mongin (Deputy Minister of Plantation Industries and Commodities II)
- Succeeded by: Chan Foong Hin
- Constituency: Beaufort

Member of the Malaysian Parliament for Beaufort
- Incumbent
- Assumed office 19 November 2022
- Preceded by: Azizah Mohd Dun (BN–UMNO)
- Majority: 2,518 (2022)

Personal details
- Born: Siti Aminah binti Aching; 25 March 1962 (age 64) Beaufort, Sabah, Malaysia
- Citizenship: Malaysia
- Party: United Malays National Organisation of Sabah (Sabah UMNO)
- Other political affiliations: Barisan Nasional (BN)
- Spouse: Jupry Abd Razak
- Children: 4
- Education: SMK Kota Klias
- Alma mater: Open University Malaysia
- Occupation: Politician

Siti Aminah binti Aching (born 25 March 1962) is a Malaysian politician who has served as the Member of Parliament for Beaufort since November 2022. She served as the Deputy Minister of Plantation and Commodities in the Unity Government administration under Prime Minister Anwar Ibrahim and Minister Fadillah Yusof from December 2022 to December 2023. She is a member and the Division Women Chief of Beaufort of the United Malays National Organisation of Sabah (Sabah UMNO), a branch of a component party of the Barisan Nasional (BN) coalition. Siti Aminah was the first Bisaya to join the government as a deputy minister in the history of Malaysia.

== Election results ==
Parliament of Malaysia
Year	Constituency	Candidate	Votes	Pct	Opponent(s)	Votes	Pct	Ballots cast	Majority	Turnout
2022	P177 Beaufort	Siti Aminah Aching (UMNO)	10,570	36.08%	Johair Mat Lani (KDM)	8,052	27.48%	29,298	2,518	67.74%
2022	P177 Beaufort	Siti Aminah Aching (UMNO)	10,570	36.08%	Dikin Musah (PKR)	7,835	26.74%	29,298	2,518	67.74%
2022	P177 Beaufort	Siti Aminah Aching (UMNO)	10,570	36.08%	Masri Adul (WARISAN)	2,152	7.35%	29,298	2,518	67.74%
2022	P177 Beaufort	Siti Aminah Aching (UMNO)	10,570	36.08%	Johan @ Christopher Ot Ghani (IND)	546	1.86%	29,298	2,518	67.74%
2022	P177 Beaufort	Siti Aminah Aching (UMNO)	10,570	36.08%	Matlani Sabli (IND)	143	0.49%	29,298	2,518	67.74%

== Honours ==
=== Honours of Malaysia ===
- Malaysia
  - Recipient of the 17th Yang di-Pertuan Agong Installation Medal (2025)
- Sabah
  - Commander of the Order of Kinabalu (PGDK) – Datuk (2020)
  - Member of the Order of Kinabalu (ADK) (2014)
