= Guan Dee Koh Hoi =

Malaysian politician (1954–2021)

Yang Berbahagia Datuk Guan Dee Koh Hoi PGDK

Senator
- In office 16 December 2020 – 26 October 2021
- Monarch: Abdullah
- Prime Minister: Muhyiddin Yassin (2020–2021); Ismail Sabri Yaakob (2021)

Deputy Minister of Tourism, Arts and Culture
- In office 16 April 2021 – 16 August 2021
- Monarch: Abdullah
- Prime Minister: Muhyiddin Yassin
- Minister: Nancy Shukri
- Preceded by: Jeffrey Kitingan
- Succeeded by: Edmund Santhara Kumar Ramanaidu

Secretary-General of the Homeland Solidarity Party
- In office 14 July 2016 – 26 October 2021
- President: Jeffrey Kitingan
- Preceded by: Position established
- Succeeded by: Edward Linggu Bukut

Personal details
- Born: Guan Dee bin Koh Hoi; 4 October 1954 Kuala Penyu, Crown Colony of North Borneo
- Died: 26 October 2021 (aged 67) Kuala Lumpur Hospital, Kuala Lumpur, Malaysia
- Citizenship: Malaysian
- Party: United Democratic Sabah People's Power Party (SETIA) (until 2008); People's Justice Party (PKR); STAR Sabah branch (2011–2016); Homeland Solidarity Party (STAR) (2016–2021)
- Other political affiliations: Perikatan Nasional (PN) (2020–2021); Gabungan Rakyat Sabah (GRS) (2020–2021)
- Occupation: Politician
- Guan Dee Koh Hoi on Parliament of Malaysia

Guan Dee bin Koh Hoi (4 October 1954 – 26 October 2021) was a Malaysian politician who served as the Deputy Minister of Tourism, Arts and Culture in the Perikatan Nasional (PN) administration under former Prime Minister Muhyiddin Yassin from April 2021 to August 2021 and Senator from December 2020 to his death in October 2021. He was a member of and also served as Secretary-General of the Homeland Solidarity Party (STAR), a component party of the ruling PN coalition, from its establishment in July 2016 to his death in October 2021.

== Politics ==
Guan Dee first stood in the 2004 general election for Kuala Penyu state seat in Sabah as a candidate for United Democratic Sabah Peoples Power Party (SETIA). In the 2008 general election he tried for, and contested the Kuala Penyu state seat again under People's Justice Party (PKR). He subsequently contested the Beaufort parliamentary seat in 2013 general election on the Sarawak's State Reform Party (STAR)'s Sabah chapter ticket. He was defeated and also had his deposit forfeited in all the three elections as the opposition candidate.

Guan Dee then joined and became secretary-general of the newly formed Homeland Solidarity Party (STAR), an offshoot of the original the Sarawak's STAR in 2016 but he did not contest any seat in the 2018 general election (GE14) and the 2020 state election. He was however made a recipient of Sabah state 'Datukship' award on 3 October 2020 after his party joined Perikatan Nasional (PN) coalition. He was also chosen by PN, the new federal ruling coalition led by Muhyiddin Yassin, the STAR party he belong was part of to be a senator on 16 December 2020. Subsequently on 16 April 2021 he was picked to fill the vacant position of Deputy Minister of Tourism, Arts and Culture, given up by STAR's president Jeffrey Kitingan to be the Sabah deputy chief minister following the 2020 state election victory of Gabungan Rakyat Sabah (GRS); which was set-up by PN coalition in Saban that also consists of STAR.

His appointment, despite the lack of credentials, had even attracted many attentions including former Prime Minister Mahathir Mohamad who has sarcastically commended it in jest.

After more than four months of his appointment, Guan Dee was finally dropped on 27 August 2021 from the federal administration under the ruling coalition new functional Prime Minister Ismail Sabri Yaakob following Muhyiddin's resignation due to his loss of the government's majority.

== Death ==
On the evening of 26 October 2021, at 4.45 pm, Guan Dee died at the age of 67, after being admitted to Hospital Kuala Lumpur due to COVID-19 complications earlier that morning.

== Election results ==
Sabah State Legislative Assembly
Year	Constituency	Candidate	Votes	Pct	Opponent(s)	Votes	Pct	Ballots cast	Majority	Turnout
2004	N26 Kuala Penyu	Guan Dee Koh Hoi (SETIA)	308	3.33%	Johan @ Christopher OT Ghani (IND)	5,157	55.83%	9,338	2,018	74.38%
2004	N26 Kuala Penyu	Guan Dee Koh Hoi (SETIA)	308	3.33%	Wences Angang @ James (UPKO)	3,139	33.98%	9,338	2,018	74.38%
2004	N26 Kuala Penyu	Guan Dee Koh Hoi (SETIA)	308	3.33%	Saman Ahmad (IND)	633	6.85%	9,338	2,018	74.38%
2008	N26 Kuala Penyu	Guan Dee Koh Hoi (PKR)	889	9.39%	Teo Kwan Ching @ Teo Mau Sing (UPKO)	4,416	46.66%	9,784	257	75.83%
2008	N26 Kuala Penyu	Guan Dee Koh Hoi (PKR)	889	9.39%	Johan @ Christopher OT Ghani (IND)	4,159	43.95%	9,784	257	75.83%

Parliament of Malaysia
Year	Constituency	Candidate	Votes	Pct	Opponent(s)	Votes	Pct	Ballots cast	Majority	Turnout
2013	P177 Beaufort	Guan Dee Koh Hoi (STAR)	409	1.61%	Azizah Mohd Dun (UMNO)	12,827	50.52%	26,950	673	86.39%
2013	P177 Beaufort	Guan Dee Koh Hoi (STAR)	409	1.61%	Lajim Ukin (PKR)	12,154	47.87%	26,950	673	86.39%

== Honours ==
=== Honours of Malaysia ===
- Sabah
  - Commander of the Order of Kinabalu (PGDK) – Datuk (2020)
