= Klias =

Constituency in Sabah, Malaysia

Klias (N32)
Sabah constituency

State constituency
- Legislature: Sabah State Legislative Assembly
MLA
Isnin Aliasnih
GRS
- Constituency created: 1974
- First contested: 1974
- Last contested: 2025

Demographics
- Population (2020): 28,397
- Electors (2025): 22,277

Klias is a state constituency in Sabah, Malaysia, that is represented in the Sabah State Legislative Assembly.

== Demographics ==
As of 2020, Klias has a population of 28,397 people.

Ethnic breakdown of Kilas' electorate as of 2025
1. Muslim Bumiputera (71.0%)
2. Non-Muslim Bumiputera (18.0%)
3. Chinese (11.0%)
4. Other ethnicities (0.00%)

== History ==
=== Polling districts ===
According to the gazette issued on 31 October 2022, the Klias constituency has a total of 12 polling districts.

State constituency	Polling District	Code	Location
Klias (N32)	Kota Klias	177/32/01	SMK Kota Klias
Klias (N32)	Malabau	177/32/02	SK Rancangan Klias
Klias (N32)	Kabulu	177/32/03	SK Kabulu
Klias (N32)	Takuli	177/32/04	SK Takuli
Klias (N32)	Limbawang	177/32/05	SK Mempagar; SK Kebatu; SK Lanjau
Klias (N32)	Klias Baru	177/32/06	SK Klias Baru; SK Pintas
Klias (N32)	Bandar Beaufort	177/32/07	SJK (C) Kung Ming (1)
Klias (N32)	Bingkul	177/32/08	SA Negeri Kampung Bingkul
Klias (N32)	Jimpangah	177/32/09	SK Batu 60
Klias (N32)	Halogilat	177/32/10	SK Biah Batu 65
Klias (N32)	Taman Wawasan	177/32/11	SA Negeri Pekan Beaufort
Klias (N32)	Klias Estate	177/32/12	Tadika Kung Ming

=== Representation history ===
Member of Sabah State Legislative Assembly for Klias
Assembly	No	Years	Member	Party
Constituency created from Beaufort and Kuala Penyu
5th	N35	1976–1981	Mohammad Taufeck Asneh	Alliance (USNO)
6th	N35	1981–1985	Mohammad Taufeck Asneh	BN (BERJAYA)
7th	N36	1985–1986	Azizah Mohd Dun	USNO
8th	N36	1986–1990	Lajim Ukin	PBS
9th	N36	1990–1994	Lajim Ukin	GR (PBS)
10th	N36	1994	Lajim Ukin	GR (PBS)
10th	N36	1994–1999	Lajim Ukin	BN (UMNO)
11th	N22	1999–2004	Lajim Ukin	BN (UMNO)
12th	N25	2004–2008	Lajim Ukin	BN (UMNO)
13th	N25	2008–2013	Azizah Mohd Dun	BN (UMNO)
14th	N25	2013–2016	Lajim Ukin	PKR
14th	N25	2016	Lajim Ukin	Independent
14th	N25	2016–2018	Lajim Ukin	PHRS
15th	N25	2018	Isnin Aliasnih	BN (UMNO)
15th	N25	2018–2019	Isnin Aliasnih	Independent
15th	N25	2019–2020	Isnin Aliasnih	PH (BERSATU)
15th	N25	2020	Isnin Aliasnih	PN (BERSATU)
16th	N32	2020–2022	Isnin Aliasnih	GRS (BERSATU)
16th	N32	2022–2023	Isnin Aliasnih	GRS (Direct)
16th	N32	2023–2025	Isnin Aliasnih	GRS (GAGASAN)
17th	N32	2025–present	Isnin Aliasnih	GRS (GAGASAN)

== Election results ==
Sabah state election, 2025: Klias
Party	Candidate	Votes	%	∆%
GRS	Isnin Aliasnih	6,078	40.01	▲40.14
BN	Osin Jilon	4,435	29.19	▲29.19
Heritage	Mohd Shaid Othman	2,808	18.48	▲18.48
PN	Mohamad Hisyam Hazaril	877	5.77	▲5.77
KDM	Mohamad Arifin Brahim	557	3.67	▲3.67
Sabah Native Co-operation Party	Jismit Japong	178	1.17	▲1.17
Sabah Dream Party	Matlani Sabli	124	0.82	▲0.82
Independent	Edwin Louis	70	0.46	▲0.46
Sabah People's Unity Party	Kaliwon Edi	66	0.43	▲0.43
Total valid votes		15,193		
Total rejected ballots		285		
Unreturned ballots		19		
Turnout		15,497	69.57	▲1.16
Registered electors		22,277		
Majority		1,643	10.82	▼22.91
GRS gain from PN		Swing		?
Source(s) "RESULTS OF CONTESTED ELECTION AND STATEMENTS OF THE POLL AFTER THE OFFICIAL ADDITION OF VOTES" (PDF).

Sabah state election, 2020: Klias
Party	Candidate	Votes	%	∆%
PN	Isnin Aliasnih	6,711	58.03	▲58.03
PKR	Abdul Rahman Mohd Yakub	2,810	24.30	▲24.30
Love Sabah Party	Abdullah Okin	1,419	12.27	▲12.27
USNO (Baru)	Amsir Dani	122	1.05	▲1.05
Independent	Jismit Japong	86	0.74	▲0.74
GAGASAN	Maksit Saidi	55	0.48	▲0.48
Total valid votes		11,203	96.88	
Total rejected ballots		327	2.83	
Unreturned ballots		34	0.29	
Turnout		11,564	68.41	▼15.30
Registered electors		16,905		
Majority		3,901	33.73	▲17.27
PN gain from BN		Swing		?
Source(s) "RESULTS OF CONTESTED ELECTION AND STATEMENTS OF THE POLL AFTER THE OFFICIAL ADDITION OF VOTES".

Sabah state election, 2018: Klias
Party	Candidate	Votes	%	∆%
BN	Isnin Aliasnih	6,173	43.51	▼4.82
Sabah People's Hope Party	Lajim Ukin	3,837	27.05	▲27.05
Sabah Heritage Party	Johair Mat Lani	3,725	26.26	▲26.26
Total valid votes		13,735	96.81	
Total rejected ballots		393	2.77	
Unreturned ballots		59	0.42	
Turnout		14,187	83.71	▼1.59
Registered electors		16,948		
Majority		2,336	16.46	▲15.09
BN gain from PKR		Swing		?
Source(s) "RESULTS OF CONTESTED ELECTION AND STATEMENTS OF THE POLL AFTER THE OFFICIAL ADDITION OF VOTES".

Sabah state election, 2013: Klias
Party	Candidate	Votes	%	∆%
PKR	Lajim Ukin	6,324	48.33	▲13.40
BN	Isnin Aliasnih	6,145	46.96	▼12.14
SAPP	Aliapa Osman	182	1.39	▲1.39
STAR	Mohd Sanusi Taripin	71	0.54	▲0.54
Total valid votes		12,722	97.23	
Total rejected ballots		342	2.61	
Unreturned ballots		21	0.16	
Turnout		13,085	85.30	▲13.40
Registered electors		15,338		
Majority		179	1.37	▼22.80
PKR gain from BN		Swing		?
Source(s) "KEPUTUSAN PILIHAN RAYA UMUM DEWAN UNDANGAN NEGERI". Archived from the original on 2022-07-09.

Sabah state election, 2008: Klias
Party	Candidate	Votes	%	∆%
BN	Azizah Mohd Dun	5,900	59.10	
PKR	Abdul Rahman Mohd Yakub	3,487	34.93	
Independent	Taufick Ruschi	109	1.09	
Independent	Mohd Tajuddin Mohd Walli	82	0.82	
Independent	Mat Lani Sabli	37	0.37	
Total valid votes		9,615	96.31	
Total rejected ballots		361	3.62	
Unreturned ballots		7	0.07	
Turnout		9,983	71.90	
Registered electors		13,885		
Majority		2,413	24.17	
BN hold		Swing		
Source(s) "KEPUTUSAN PILIHAN RAYA UMUM DEWAN UNDANGAN NEGERI SABAH BAGI TAHUN 2008".

Sabah state election, 2004: Klias
Party	Candidate	Votes	%	∆%
On the nomination day, Lajim Ukin won uncontested.
BN	Lajim Ukin			
Total valid votes				
Total rejected ballots				
Unreturned ballots				
Turnout				
Registered electors		13,899		
Majority				
BN hold		Swing		
Source(s) "KEPUTUSAN PILIHAN RAYA UMUM DEWAN UNDANGAN NEGERI SABAH BAGI TAHUN 2004".

Sabah state election, 1999: Klias
Party	Candidate	Votes	%	∆%
BN	Lajim Ukin	7,209	63.23	▲15.95
PBS	Abdul Rahman Mohd Yakub	3,434	30.12	▼21.43
BERSEKUTU	Saidin Musi	640	5.61	▲5.61
Total valid votes		11,283	98.96	
Total rejected ballots		119	1.04	
Unreturned ballots		0	0.00	
Turnout		11,402	75.65	▼3.03
Registered electors		15,073		
Majority		3,775	33.11	▲28.84
BN gain from PBS		Swing		?
Source(s) "KEPUTUSAN PILIHAN RAYA UMUM DEWAN UNDANGAN NEGERI SABAH BAGI TAHUN 1999".

Sabah state election, 1994: Klias
Party	Candidate	Votes	%	∆%
PBS	Lajim Ukin	4,881	51.55	▼0.25
BN	Anifah Aman	4,476	47.28	▲47.28
Total valid votes		9,357	98.83	
Total rejected ballots		111	1.17	
Unreturned ballots		0	0.00	
Turnout		9,468	78.68	▲0.19
Registered electors		12,033		
Majority		405	4.27	▼6.87
PBS hold		Swing		
Source(s) "KEPUTUSAN PILIHAN RAYA UMUM DEWAN UNDANGAN NEGERI SABAH BAGI TAHUN 1994".

Sabah state election, 1990: Klias
Party	Candidate	Votes	%	∆%
PBS	Lajim Ukin	3,679	51.80	▲3.32
USNO	Azizah Mohd Dun	2,888	40.66	▼6.11
BERJAYA	Loi Siang Tong @ Christopher Lai	348	4.90	▲1.39
AKAR	Duin Banang	111	1.56	▲1.56
Total valid votes		7,026	98.93	
Total rejected ballots		76	1.07	
Unreturned ballots		0	0.00	
Turnout		7,102	78.49	▲3.94
Registered electors		9,048		
Majority		791	11.14	▲9.43
PBS hold		Swing		
Source(s) "KEPUTUSAN PILIHAN RAYA UMUM DEWAN UNDANGAN NEGERI SABAH BAGI TAHUN 1990".

Sabah state election, 1986: Klias
Party	Candidate	Votes	%	∆%
PBS	Lajim Ukin	2,749	48.48	
USNO	Azizah Mohd Dun	2,652	46.77	
BERJAYA	Godfrey Eigur @ Empih	199	3.51	
Total valid votes		5,600	98.77	
Total rejected ballots		70	1.23	
Unreturned ballots		0	0.00	
Turnout		5,670	74.55	
Registered electors		7,606		
Majority		97	1.71	
PBS gain from USNO		Swing		?
Source(s) "KEPUTUSAN PILIHAN RAYA UMUM DEWAN UNDANGAN NEGERI SABAH BAGI TAHUN 1986".

Sabah state election, 1985: Klias
Party	Candidate	Votes	%	∆%
USNO	Azizah Mohd Dun	2,024	42.05	▲6.03
PBS	Lajim Ukin	1,723	35.80	▲35.80
BERJAYA	Mohd. Taufeck Asneh	986	20.49	▼31.77
BERSEPADU	Edeh Abdul Rahman	80	1.66	▲1.66
Total valid votes		4,813	100.00	
Total rejected ballots		105		
Unreturned ballots		0		
Turnout		4,918	72.93	▼1.97
Registered electors		6,743		
Majority		301	6.25	▼9.99
USNO gain from BERJAYA		Swing		-

Sabah state election, 1981: Klias
Party	Candidate	Votes	%	∆%
BERJAYA	Mohd. Taufeck Asneh	2,568	52.26	▲6.23
USNO	Binsin Aliasmat	1,770	36.02	▼17.95
Independent	Sylvester John	350	7.12	▲7.12
Independent	Lajim Md. Yusof	156	3.17	▲3.17
Independent	Abdul Rahman Tadin	70	1.42	▲1.42
Total valid votes		4,914	100.00	
Total rejected ballots		98		
Unreturned ballots		0		
Turnout		5,012	74.90	▼5.78
Registered electors		6,692		
Majority		798	16.24	▲8.29
BERJAYA hold		Swing		

Sabah state election, 1976: Klias
Party	Candidate	Votes	%
USNO	Mohd. Taufeck Asneh	2,166	53.97
BERJAYA	Lajim Md. Yusof	1,847	46.03
Total valid votes		4,013	100.00
Total rejected ballots		172	
Unreturned ballots		0	
Turnout		4,185	80.68
Registered electors		5,187	
Majority		319	7.95
This was a new constituency created
