= Ghulamhaidar Khan =

Malaysian politician

Yang Berhormat Dato' Sri Ghulamhaidar Khan Bahadar SSAP PGDK DMSM MLA
- غلام حيدر خان بهادر

Ministerial roles (Sabah)
- 2008–2013: Assistant Minister of Local Government and Housing
- 2013–2018: Assistant Minister of Infrastructure Development

Faction represented in Sabah State Legislative Assembly
- 2004–2018: Barisan Nasional
- 2018–2019: Independent
- 2019–2020: Pakatan Harapan
- 2023–: Parti Gagasan Rakyat Sabah
- 2023–: Gabungan Rakyat Sabah

Personal details
- Born: Ghulamhaidar @ Yusof bin Khan Bahadar; 9 June 1955 (age 70) Papar, Crown Colony of North Borneo (now Sabah, Malaysia)
- Citizenship: Malaysian
- Party: United Malays National Organisation Sabah (Sabah UMNO) (until 2018); Bersatu Sabah (BERSATU Sabah) (2019–2022); Parti Gagasan Rakyat Sabah (GAGASAN) (2023-present)
- Other political affiliations: Barisan Nasional (BN) (until 2018); Pakatan Harapan (PH) (2019-2020); Perikatan Nasional (PN) (2020-2022); Muafakat Nasional (MN) (2020-2022); Gabungan Rakyat Sabah (GRS) (2023-present)
- Spouse: Rosna Haji Mohd Yunus
- Occupation: Politician

Ghulamhaidar @ Yusof bin Khan Bahadar (born 9 June 1955) is a Malaysian politician who has been the Assistant State Minister. He has served as the Member of Sabah State Legislative Assembly (MLA) for Kawang since March 2004. He is currently a member of the Parti Gagasan Rakyat Sabah (GAGASAN) which is a component party of the ruling Gabungan Rakyat Sabah (GRS) coalition both in federal and state levels. Gulam Haidar is also the director of Yayasan Sabah Group.

== Election results ==
Sabah State Legislative Assembly
| Year | Constituency | Candidate | Votes | Pct | Opponent(s) | Votes | Pct | Ballots cast | Majority | Turnout |
|---|---|---|---|---|---|---|---|---|---|---|
| 2004 | N21 Kawang | Gulam Haidar Khan Bahadar (UMNO) | 8,213 | 80.94% | Maiji Jaigul (PASOK) | 1,934 | 19.06% | 10,289 | 6,279 | 70.43% |
| 2008 | N21 Kawang | Gulam Haidar Khan Bahadar (UMNO) | 8,605 | 74.29% | Zavilin Evelyn (PKR) | 2,539 | 21.92% | 11,845 | 6,066 | 77.02% |
| 2008 | N21 Kawang | Gulam Haidar Khan Bahadar (UMNO) | 8,605 | 74.29% | Pengiran Othman Rauf (IND) | 295 | 2.55% | 11,845 | 6,066 | 77.02% |
| 2008 | N21 Kawang | Gulam Haidar Khan Bahadar (UMNO) | 8,605 | 74.29% | Maiji Jaigul (BERSEKUTU) | 144 | 1.24% | 11,845 | 6,066 | 77.02% |
| 2013 | N21 Kawang | Gulam Haidar Khan Bahadar (UMNO) | 12,301 | 72.98% | Kefli Damash (PKR) | 3,401 | 20.18% | 17,093 | 8,900 | 86.10% |
| 2013 | N21 Kawang | Gulam Haidar Khan Bahadar (UMNO) | 12,301 | 72.98% | Edward Dagul (SAPP) | 906 | 5.37% | 17,093 | 8,900 | 86.10% |
| 2013 | N21 Kawang | Gulam Haidar Khan Bahadar (UMNO) | 12,301 | 72.98% | Akop Damash (STAR) | 248 | 1.47% | 17,093 | 8,900 | 86.10% |
| 2018 | N21 Kawang | Gulam Haidar Khan Bahadar (UMNO) | 10,388 | 54.97% | Salleh Eddris (WARISAN) | 7,526 | 39.84% | 19,585 | 2,862 | 84.80% |
| 2018 | N21 Kawang | Gulam Haidar Khan Bahadar (UMNO) | 10,388 | 54.97% | Matlin Jilon (PHRS) | 781 | 4.13% | 19,585 | 2,862 | 84.80% |
| 2018 | N21 Kawang | Gulam Haidar Khan Bahadar (UMNO) | 10,388 | 54.97% | Wahid Ismail (PKAN) | 201 | 1.06% | 19,585 | 2,862 | 84.80% |
| 2020 | N28 Kawang | Gulam Haidar Khan Bahadar (BERSATU) | 7,747 | 71.24% | Musli Sapan (WARISAN) | 2,653 | 23.55% | 9,086 | 5,094 | 67.68% |
| 2020 | N28 Kawang | Gulam Haidar Khan Bahadar (BERSATU) | 7,747 | 71.24% | Abdul Rahim Lassim (PCS) | 192 | 2.11% | 9,086 | 5,094 | 67.68% |
| 2020 | N28 Kawang | Gulam Haidar Khan Bahadar (BERSATU) | 7,747 | 71.24% | Awang Arip Nasib (USNO Baru) | 163 | 1.79% | 9,086 | 5,094 | 67.68% |
| 2020 | N28 Kawang | Gulam Haidar Khan Bahadar (BERSATU) | 7,747 | 71.24% | Janrywine J Lusin (LDP) | 119 | 1.31% | 9,086 | 5,094 | 67.68% |

== Honours ==
- Malacca
  - Companion Class I of the Order of Malacca (DMSM) – Datuk (2005)
- Pahang
  - Knight Grand Companion of the Order of Sultan Ahmad Shah of Pahang (SSAP) – Dato' Sri (2013)
- Sabah
  - Commander of the Order of Kinabalu (PGDK) – Datuk (2015)
