= Lajim Ukin =

Malaysian politician (1955–2021)

Yang Berbahagia Datuk Seri Panglima Lajim Ukin SPDK DCSM PGDK JMN JP

Deputy Minister of Housing and Local Government
- In office 10 April 2009 – 30 July 2012
- Monarchs: Mizan Zainal Abidin; Abdul Halim
- Prime Minister: Najib Razak
- Minister: Kong Cho Ha (2009–2010); Chor Chee Heung (2010–2012)
- Preceded by: Hamzah Zainudin; Robert Lau Hoi Chew
- Succeeded by: Halimah Mohamed Sadique as Deputy Minister of Housing, Local Government and Urban Wellbeing
- Constituency: Beaufort

Deputy Minister of Transport
- In office 19 March 2008 – 9 April 2009
- Monarch: Mizan Zainal Abidin
- Prime Minister: Abdullah Ahmad Badawi
- Minister: Ong Tee Keat
- Preceded by: Tengku Azlan Sultan Abu Bakar; Douglas Uggah Embas
- Succeeded by: Abdul Rahim Bakri; Robert Lau Hoi Chew
- Constituency: Beaufort

State Leader of the Opposition of Sabah
- In office 14 June 2013 – 2 October 2016
- Governor: Juhar Mahiruddin
- Chief Minister: Musa Aman
- Preceded by: Melanie Chia Chui Ket
- Succeeded by: Christina Liew Chin Jin
- Constituency: Klias

Member of the Malaysian Parliament for Beaufort
- In office 8 March 2008 – 5 May 2013
- Preceded by: Azizah Mohd Dun (UMNO—BN)
- Succeeded by: Azizah Mohd Dun (UMNO—BN)
- Majority: 10,914 (2008)

Member of the Sabah State Legislative Assembly for Klias
- In office 6 May 2013 – 10 May 2018
- Preceded by: Azizah Mohd Dun (BN—UMNO)
- Succeeded by: Isnin Aliasnih (BN—UMNO)
- Majority: 179 (2013)

Personal details
- Born: 15 June 1955 Beaufort, North Borneo (now Sabah, Malaysia)
- Died: 29 August 2021 (aged 66) Kota Kinabalu, Sabah, Malaysia
- Cause of death: COVID-19
- Resting place: Muslim Cemetery, Kampung Kebatu, Beaufort, Sabah
- Party: United Sabah National Organisation (USNO) (1973–1975); Sabah People's United Front (BERJAYA) (1975–1983); United Sabah Party (PBS) (1983–1994); United Malays National Organisation (UMNO) (1994–2012); People's Justice Party (PKR) (2012–2016); Sabah People's Hope Party (PHRS) (2016–2019); Malaysian United Indigenous Party (BERSATU) (2019–2021)
- Spouse: Normilah Siong
- Occupation: Politician

Lajim Ukin (15 June 1955 – 29 August 2021) was a Malaysian politician.

He was the Member of Parliament (MP) for the Beaufort constituency in Sabah from 2008 to 2013, the Deputy Minister of Transport from 2008 to 2009, and the Deputy Minister for Housing and Local Government from 2009 to 2012; in the federal Barisan Nasional (BN) coalition government.

Lajim previously served as Deputy Chief Minister of Sabah for three terms from 1999. He was also the Leader of the Opposition in the Sabah State Legislative Assembly (2013–2016). Lajim was the Malaysian United Indigenous Party (BERSATU) supreme council member and also Amanah Ikhtiar Malaysia (AIM) executive chairman at the time of his death in 2021.

== Political career ==
Before entering federal politics, Lajim was a prominent figure in Sabah state politics. He was a member of the United Sabah Party (PBS) before defecting to United Malays National Organisation (UMNO) in 1994. He later served as Deputy Chief Minister in the Sabah government.

Lajim was elected to Parliament in the 2008 election, as a member of the United Malays National Organisation (UMNO) in the seat of Beaufort. He was subsequently appointed Deputy Minister for Transport, moving to the portfolio of Housing and Local Government in 2009. In July 2012, he renounced his official positions in UMNO to align himself with the Pakatan Rakyat (PR) opposition coalition. This resulted in the revocation of his appointment as a deputy minister. He recontested his parliamentary seat of Beaufort in the 2013 election on a People's Justice Party (PKR) ticket, but was defeated. While losing his federal seat, he won the election for the Sabah State Legislative Assembly seat of Klias. He became the leader of the opposition in the State Assembly.

On 2 October 2016, Lajim resigned from PKR along with two other Pakatan Harapan (PH) assemblymen. He has stated his intention to form a new Sabah-based party and ally with the former Sabah UMNO leader, Shafie Apdal. He later decided to establish a separate party from Shafie, known as Sabah People's Hope Party (PHRS), which was finally approved by Registrar of Societies (RoS) on 25 October 2016. PHRS was dissolved to let its party members be absorbed into Malaysian United Indigenous Party (BERSATU) in 2019. After being absorbed, he became BERSATU Sabah Election Director before being appointed a BERSATU Supreme Council member for the term 2019 to 2022.

Lajim is also known to default on his promises. After commissioning a ghostwriter to write a book about the history of his political party, he failed to deliver on his promises to pay the writer and printing costs, leaving the writer in debt with unsold books. This is thought to be one of the factors that eroded the voters' confidence in the ruling coalition that his party belongs to, culminating in the results of 2020 Kimanis by-election, which saw the opposition coalition BN win, defeating the three-way coalition containing PH, which incorporates BERSATU.

== Personal life ==
Lajim was married to Normilah Siong. The couple divorced sometime later.

In early 2017, Lajim was injured after falling from a train car on the way to attend a wedding. He was then referred to a local traditional Chinese medicine (TCM) practitioner or "sinseh" and was advised to rest for one week.

In 2021, Lajim was screened and tested positive for COVID-19 at Gleneagles Hospital Kota Kinabalu on 1 August before his admission to KPJ Sabah Specialist Hospital on 13 August. With a history of chronic illnesses, including a kidney transplant and heart ailment, he was later placed under an induced coma after his health deteriorated on 24 August afternoon. On 29 August at 6.23 am, Lajim aged 66 died due to COVID-19 pandemic complications. His remains were brought to his hometown at Kampung Kebatu Beaufort for last rites and burial.

== Election results ==
Parliament of Malaysia
Year	Constituency	Candidate	Votes	Pct	Opponent(s)	Votes	Pct	Ballots cast	Majority	Turnout
2008	P177 Beaufort	Lajim Ukin (UMNO)	14,780	79.27%	Lajim Md Yusof (PKR)	3,866	20.73%	19,327	10,914	72.22%
2013	P177 Beaufort	Lajim Ukin (PKR)	12,154	47.87%	Azizah Mohd Dun (UMNO)	12,827	50.52%	26,950	673	86.39%
2013	P177 Beaufort	Lajim Ukin (PKR)	12,154	47.87%	Guan Dee Koh Hoi (STAR)	409	1.61%	26,950	673	86.39%
2018	P177 Beaufort	Lajim Ukin (PHRS)	8,023	29.48%	Azizah Mohd Dun (UMNO)	11,354	41.72%	28,011	3,331	84.44%
2018	P177 Beaufort	Lajim Ukin (PHRS)	8,023	29.48%	Johan Ghani (PKR)	7,835	28.79%	28,011	3,331	84.44%

Sabah State Legislative Assembly
Year	Constituency	Candidate	Votes	Pct	Opponent(s)	Votes	Pct	Ballots cast	Majority	Turnout
1986	N36 Klias	Lajim Ukin (PBS)	2,749	49.09%	Azizah Mohd Dun (USNO)	2,652	47.36%	5,670	97	74.55%
1986	N36 Klias	Lajim Ukin (PBS)	2,749	49.09%	Empih Godfrey Eigur (BERJAYA)	199	3.55%	5,670	97	74.55%
1990	N36 Klias	Lajim Ukin (PBS)	3,679	52.36%	Azizah Mohd Dun (USNO)	2,888	41.11%	7,102	791	78.49%
1990	N36 Klias	Lajim Ukin (PBS)	3,679	52.36%	Loi Siang Tong (BERJAYA)	348	4.95%	7,102	791	78.49%
1990	N36 Klias	Lajim Ukin (PBS)	3,679	52.36%	Duin Banang (AKAR)	111	1.58%	7,102	791	78.49%
1994	N36 Klias	Lajim Ukin (PBS)	4,881	49.09%	Anifah Aman (UMNO)	4,476	47.36%	9,468	405	78.68%
1999	N22 Klias	Lajim Ukin (UMNO)	7,209	63.89%	Ab Rahman Md Yakub (PBS)	3,434	30.44%	11,402	3,775	75.65%
1999	N22 Klias	Lajim Ukin (UMNO)	7,209	63.89%	Saidi Musi (AKAR)	640	5.67%	11,402	3,775	75.65%
2004	N25 Klias	Lajim Ukin (UMNO)	None	None	Unopposed					
2013	N25 Klias	Lajim Ukin (PKR)	6,324	49.71%	Isnin Aliasnih (UMNO)	6,145	48.30%	13,064	179	85.30%
2013	N25 Klias	Lajim Ukin (PKR)	6,324	49.71%	Mohd Sanusi Taripin (SAPP)	182	1.43%	13,064	179	85.30%
2013	N25 Klias	Lajim Ukin (PKR)	6,324	49.71%	Aliapa Osman (STAR)	71	0.56%	13,064	179	85.30%
2018	N25 Klias	Lajim Ukin (PHRS)	3,837	27.94%	Isnin Aliasnih (UMNO)	6,173	44.94%	14,187	2,336	83.70%
2018	N25 Klias	Lajim Ukin (PHRS)	3,837	27.94%	Johair Mat Lani (WARISAN)	3,725	27.12%	14,187	2,336	83.70%

== Honours ==
=== Honours of Malaysia ===
- Malaysia
  - Companion of the Order of the Defender of the Realm (JMN) (1997)
- Malacca
  - Knight Commander of the Exalted Order of Malacca (DCSM) – Datuk Wira (2010)
- Sabah
  - Grand Commander of the Order of Kinabalu (SPDK) – Datuk Seri Panglima (1998)
  - Commander of the Order of Kinabalu (PGDK) – Datuk (1989)
  - Justice of the Peace (JP) (1994)

== See also ==
- List of deaths due to COVID-19 - notable individual deaths
