= 2018 Sabah state election =

State election in Malaysia

- 9 May 2018

All 60 seats to the Sabah State Legislative Assembly 31 seats needed for a majority
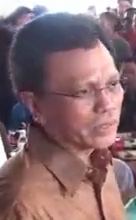

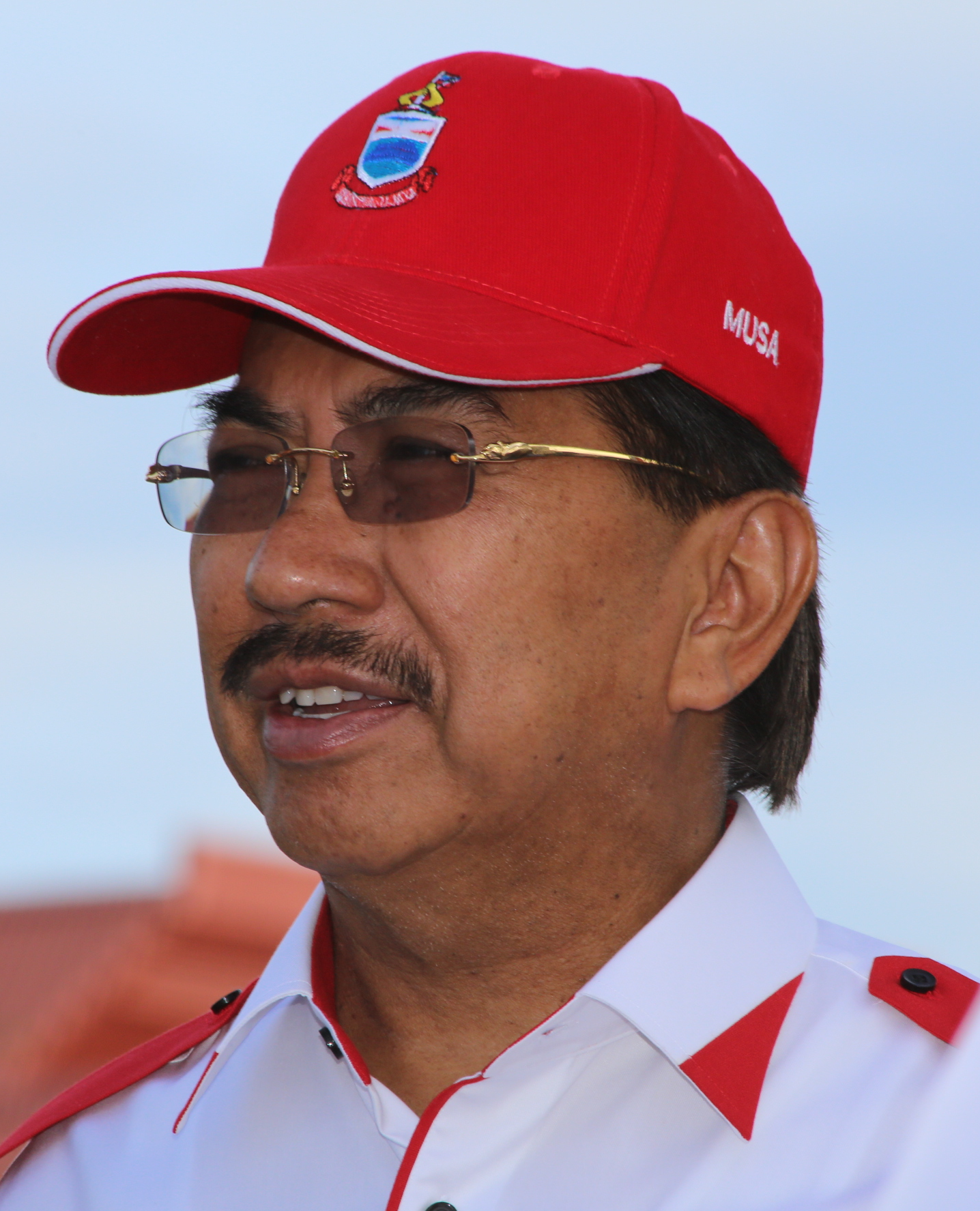

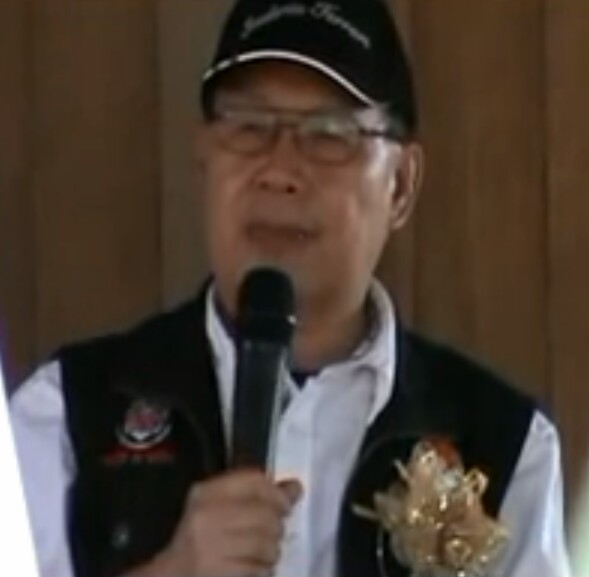
	Majority party	Minority party	Third party
			GS
Leader	Shafie Apdal	Musa Aman	Paumin @ Mohd. Aminuddin Aling
Party	Pakatan Harapan Warisan	Barisan Nasional (UMNO)	Gagasan Sejahtera (PAS)
Leader since	17 October 2016	27 March 2003	2012
Leader's seat	Senallang	Sungai Sibuga	Not contesting (ran in Tuaran - lost seat)
Last election	11 seats, 29.6% (Pakatan Rakyat)	48 seats, 55.78%	No seat, 2.76% (Pakatan Rakyat)
Seats before	6	45	Steady
Seats won	29	29	0
Seat change	▲23	▼16	Steady
Popular vote	398,533	355,091	11,241
Percentage	47.19%	42.04%	1.33%
Swing	▲17.59%	▼13.74%	▼1.43%
	Fourth party	Fifth party	Sixth party
		PHRS	PCS
Leader	Jeffrey Kitingan	Lajim Ukin	Wilfred Bumburing
Party	United Sabah Alliance (STAR)	United Sabah Alliance (PHRS)	Parti Cinta Sabah
Leader since	6 January 2012	2016	2013
Leader's seat	Tambunan	Klias (lost seat)	Tamparuli (lost seat)
Last election	1 seat, 5.63%	New party	New party
Seats before	1	1	1
Seats won	2	0	0
Seat change	▲1	▼1	▼1
Popular vote	39,803	17,713	9,311
Percentage	4.71%	2.1%	1.1%
Swing	▼0.92%	▲2.1%	▲1.1%
Chief Minister before election
Musa Aman
Barisan Nasional
Chief Minister
Shafie Apdal
Warisan

The 2018 Sabah state election took place on 9 May 2018 in concurrence with the 14th Malaysian general election. This election was to elect 60 members of the 15th Sabah State Legislative Assembly. The previous Assembly was dissolved on 7 April 2018.

Barisan Nasional (BN), with the most seats, would be able to form a minority government alone. But BN and Homeland Solidarity Party (STAR) decided to form a group of 31 seats, which would allow them to form a coalition government. Musa Aman reinstalled as Chief Minister on 10 May 2018.

However, Sabah Heritage Party (WARISAN) (including 6 BN assemblymen who switched allegiance to WARISAN), Democratic Action Party (DAP) and People's Justice Party (PKR), with confidence and supply of United Pasokmomogun Kadazandusun Murut Organisation (UPKO), managed to form a pact of 39 seats in order to form a coalition government.

Governor Juhar Mahiruddin installed Mohd. Shafie Apdal as the 15th Chief Minister on 12 May 2018. That marks the end of 24-year rule of BN in Sabah and the change of governing party in Sabah for the fifth time since 1963.

== Election pendulum ==
The 14th General Election witnessed 29 governmental seats (later with addition of 10 members from non-governmental seats (6 from UPKO and 4 from UMNO) that decided to support the creation of new state government) and 31 non-governmental seats (later became 21 seats after 10 of them decided to support new government) filled the Sabah State Legislative Assembly. The government side has 11 safe seat and 4 fairly safe seat, while the non-government side has 2 safe seats and 5 fairly safe seats.

GOVERNMENT SEATS
Marginal
Melalap	Peter Anthony	WARISAN	46.81
Liawan	Rasinin Kautis	WARISAN	47.75
Banggi	Mohamad Mohamarin	WARISAN	47.79
Petagas	Uda Sulai	WARISAN	47.97
Kunak	Norazlinah Arif	WARISAN	48.20
Tungku	Assaffal P. Alian	WARISAN	49.89
Bongawan	Dr. Daud Yusof	WARISAN	50.62
Gum-Gum	Arunarsin Taib	WARISAN	51.10
Sindumin	Dr. Yusof Yacob	WARISAN	51.90
Merotai	Sarifuddin Hata	WARISAN	51.94
Tanjong Kapor	Ben Chong Chen Bin	WARISAN	54.31
Pantai Manis	Aidi Moktar	WARISAN	54.52
Karambunai	Azhar Matussin	WARISAN	54.66
Lahad Datu	Dumi Pg. Masdal	WARISAN	55.58
Fairly safe
Tanjong Papat	Frankie Poon Ming Fung	DAP	56.20
Tanjong Aru	Junz Wong Hong Jun	WARISAN	56.23
Sekong	Arifin Asgali	WARISAN	56.55
Api-Api	Christina Liew Chin Jin	PKR	57.04
Safe
Moyog	Jennifer Lasimbang	WARISAN	61.39
Inanam	Kenny Chua Teck Ho	PKR	62.33
Karamunting	Hiew Vun Zin	WARISAN	63.67
Elopura	Calvin Chong Ket Kiun	DAP	68.68
Kapayan	Janie Lasimbang	DAP	71.95
Sri Tanjong	Jimmy Wong Sze Phin	DAP	72.00
Sulabayan	Jaujan Sambakong	WARISAN	74.91
Senallang	Mohd. Shafie Apdal	WARISAN	75.97
Bugaya	Manis Buka Mohd. Darah	WARISAN	77.51
Likas	Tan Lee Fatt	DAP	82.57
Luyang	Ginger Phoong Jin Zhe	DAP	84.38

NON-GOVERNMENT SEATS
Marginal
Bingkor	Robert Tawik @ Nordin	STAR	33.19
Kundasang	Joachim Gunsalam	PBS	37.14
Matunggong	Julita Majunki	PBS	41.80
Kiulu	Joniston Bangkuai	PBS	42.39
Pitas	Bolkiah Ismail	UMNO	44.40
Klias	Isnin Aliasnih	UMNO	44.94
Tamparuli	Jahid Jahim	PBS	45.46
Sebatik	Abd. Muis Picho	UMNO	46.70
Tambunan	Dr. Jeffrey Gapari @ Geoffrey Kitingan	STAR	46.78
Balung	Osman Jamal	UMNO	47.08
Kadamaian	Ewon Benedick	UPKO	47.80
Paginatan	Abidin Madingkir	UPKO	48.84
Tempasuk	Musbah Jamli	UMNO	50.82
Tanjong Batu	Hamisa Samat	UMNO	50.92
Tandek	Anita Baranting	PBS	51.21
Usukan	Japlin Akim	UMNO	52.40
Kemabong	Jamawi Ja’afar	UMNO	52.68
Sook	Ellron Alfred Angin	PBRS	53.21
Apas	Nizam Abu Bakar Titingan	UMNO	53.58
Sungai Sibuga	Musa Aman	UMNO	53.59
Labuk	Abd. Rahman Kongkawang	PBS	53.64
Kuala Penyu	Limus Jury	UPKO	54.64
Kawang	Ghulam Haidar Khan Bahadar	UMNO	54.97
Sugut	James Ratib	UPKO	55.77
Fairly safe
Lumadan	Matbali Musah	UMNO	56.65
Membakut	Mohd. Arifin Mohd. Arif	UMNO	57.22
Kuamut	Masiung Banah	UPKO	59.00
Sukau	Saddi Abdu Rahman	UMNO	59.14
Nabawan	Bobbey Ah Fang Suan	UPKO	59.52
Safe
Karanaan	Masidi Manjun	UMNO	63.98
Sulaman	Hajiji Mohd. Noor	UMNO	69.62

== Results ==
The following political parties contested in this election. The following is a summary of results of this election.

Party or alliance		Votes	%	Seats	+/–
Barisan Nasional	United Malays National Organisation	208,600	24.71	17	–14
Barisan Nasional	United Sabah Party	70,998	8.41	6	–1
Barisan Nasional	United Pasokmomogun Kadazandusun Murut Organisation	33,395	3.96	5	+1
Barisan Nasional	Liberal Democratic Party	15,084	1.79	0	–3
Barisan Nasional	Malaysian Chinese Association	14,970	1.77	0	0
Barisan Nasional	Parti Bersatu Rakyat Sabah	8,042	0.95	1	0
Barisan Nasional	Parti Gerakan Rakyat Malaysia	4,002	0.47	0	–2
Barisan Nasional	Total	355,091	42.05	29	–19
Sabah Heritage Party		271,446	32.15	21	New
Pakatan Harapan	Democratic Action Party	78,901	9.34	6	+2
Pakatan Harapan	People's Justice Party	47,723	5.65	2	–5
Pakatan Harapan	National Trust Party	193	0.02	0	0
Pakatan Harapan	Total	126,817	15.02	8	–3
United Sabah Alliance	Homeland Solidarity Party	39,803	4.71	2	+1
United Sabah Alliance	Sabah People's Hope Party	17,713	2.10	0	0
United Sabah Alliance	Sabah Progressive Party	5,031	0.60	0	0
United Sabah Alliance	Sabah People's Unity Party	1,491	0.18	0	0
United Sabah Alliance	Total	63,978	7.58	2	+2
Gagasan Sejahtera	Pan-Malaysian Islamic Party	11,241	1.33	0	0
Love Sabah Party		9,311	1.10	0	0
Sabah Native Co-operation Party		3,059	0.36	0	0
Sabah Nationality Party		2,018	0.24	0	0
United Sabah National Organisation (New)		147	0.02	0	0
State Reform Party		109	0.01	0	0
Independents		1,079	0.13	0	0
Total		844,356	100.00	60	0
Valid votes		844,356	97.42		
Invalid/blank votes		22,369	2.58		
Total votes		866,725	100.00		
Registered voters/turnout		1,117,877	77.53		
Source: Election Commission of Malaysia

== Aftermath ==
=== Government formation ===
In the 2018 general election, WARISAN together with the coalition of Pakatan Harapan (PH) are tied up with 29-29 seats with the Barisan Nasional in the election. Jeffrey Kitingan with his party of Homeland Solidarity Party (STAR) under the United Sabah Alliance (USA) which are not aligned from either the two sides, has won two seats in the election and subsequently emerged as the decision maker for the formation of a state government from the two sides. Kitingan then decide to team up with the BN to form coalition state government with him appointed as a Deputy Chief Minister while Musa Aman from BN to become the Chief Minister for another 5 years under the new coalition government. However, the situation changed when six seats assemblymen from the BN allied parties of United Pasokmomogun Kadazandusun Murut Organisation (UPKO) and United Sabah People's Party (PBRS) switched their allegiance to WARISAN, giving Shafie an advantage with 35 seats which is sufficient to establish a coalition state government. Earlier, Musa Aman had initially been sworn in as Chief Minister following the help of two seats from STAR. This situation has left Sabah with two ruling Chief Ministers, the second time in its history since the dispute between PBS and USNO in 1980s.

The result of these events sparks a constitutional crisis in Sabah, and the need to review and change the current constitution so as to curb the "allegiance switching" of assemblymen, after the swearing-in ceremony of the chief minister. Another four seats assemblymen from BN allied parties of UMNO and UPKO switching their allegiance to WARISAN on 13 May 2018. The Yang di-Pertua Negeri (TYT) Juhar Mahiruddin also had requested for Musa to step down, despite Musa still stressing that he still the rightful Chief Minister. Musa was then issued a letter from the TYT that he is no longer the Chief Minister effective from 12 May 2018 that was delivered into his residence on 14 May 2018.

=== Snap election ===
The state government led by Shafie only lasts 26 months, when another constitutional crisis between Shafie and Musa resulted in the Governor of Sabah, Juhar Mahiruddin decision to dissolve the State Legislative Assembly on the advice of Shafie on 30 June 2020. The 2020 election took place on 26 September 2020.
