= Sabah People's Hope Party =

Sabah People's Hope Party Parti Harapan Rakyat Sabah
- Malay name: Parti Harapan Rakyat Sabah
- Abbreviation: Harapan Rakyat / PHRS
- President: Liew Yun Fah
- Secretary-General: Christy Chok Lee Lui
- Deputy President: Samsiah Usman (acting)
- Founders: Lajim Ukin (2016–2019); Liew Yun Fah (re-established in 2020)
- Founded: 25 October 2016; September 2020 (2020 state election; re-established)
- Dissolved: 5 April 2019 (Dissolved under Lajim Ukin, re-established under Liew Yun Fah in 2020)
- Split from: People's Justice Party (Lajim Ukin, 2016); National Trust Party (Liew Yun Fah, 2020)
- Headquarters: Tawau, Sabah
- Ideology: Regionalism
- National affiliation: Gabungan Rakyat Sabah (since 2023) (Note: The party was part of United Sabah Alliance (2017–2018), and allied with GRS (2022-2023)); National Unity Government (since 2022)
- Colours: Light blue, white and red
- Dewan Negara: 0 / 70
- Dewan Rakyat (in Sabah): 0 / 25
- Dewan Undangan Negeri Sabah: 0 / 79

Election symbol
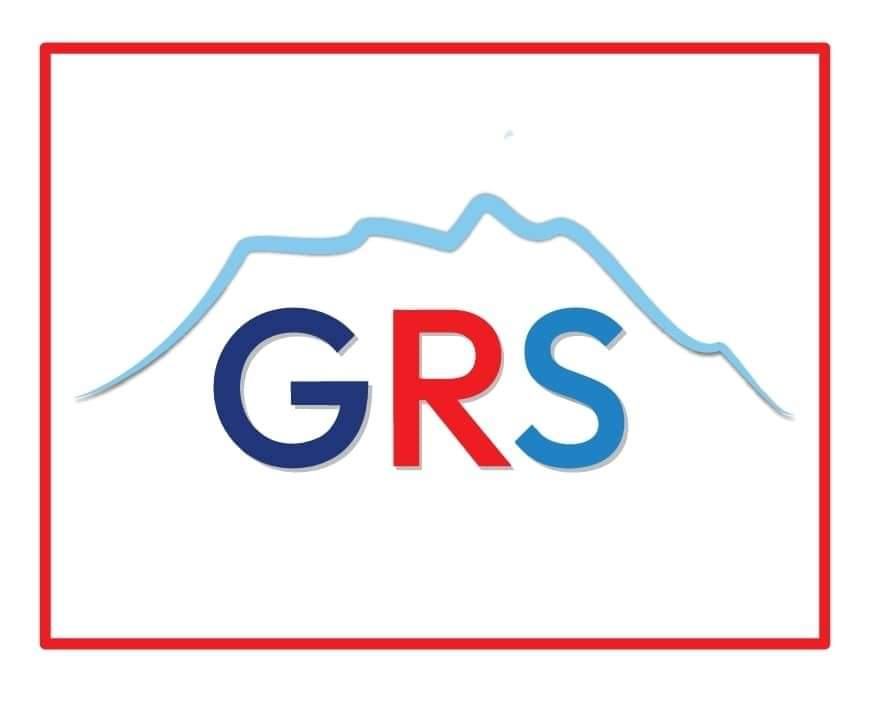

Party flag

Sabah People's Hope Party (Malay: Parti Harapan Rakyat Sabah (Harapan Rakyat/PHRS)) is a Sabah-based party located in Tawau city, founded by Lajim Ukin and Liew Yun Fah. Its ideology is based on Sabah regionalism which supports Sabah state administration by local-based parties and to reduce the control of peninsula-based parties over the state, such as Barisan Nasional, Pakatan Harapan and Perikatan Nasional.

First established in 2016, the party was temporarily dissolved in 2019 to allow members to join Malaysian United Indigenous Party (BERSATU). In 2020, it was founded once again ahead of snap election.

== History ==
The party was formed on 25 October 2016, founded by Lajim Ukin. It was previously a party in the alliance of United Sabah Alliance (USA) from 2017 until 2018. In 2019, Harapan Rakyat planned and was supposed to hold an extraordinary general meeting (EGM) to dissolve the party and absorb its 64,000 members into Malaysian United Indigenous Party (BERSATU) at the launch of the party's Sabah chapter on 6 April 2019 in Kota Kinabalu.

Somehow the dissolution was deferred and registration of party was left to remain dormant until it was revived and reestablished again ahead of the September 2020 Sabah state election which allowed the party led by new president, Liew Yun Fah to participate in the snap polls. To date, only two members of the party have served as member of legislative (MLA): the founder himself Lajim Ukin between 2016 until 2018, and Rina Jainal of Kukusan seat, who defected from the WARISAN party in 2022. Rina Jainal later was sacked by the party immediately before 2025 Sabah state election and ran as independent

On 5 April 2023, the party has officially been admitted into Gabungan Rakyat Sabah (GRS) after its membership application had been accepted by the coalition.

== Elected representatives ==
=== Dewan Undangan Negeri (State Legislative Assembly) ===
Sabah State Legislative Assembly

0 / 79

== Government offices ==
=== State governments ===
- Sabah (2022–2025)

Note: bold as Chief Minister, italic as junior partner

== General election results ==
Election	Total seats won	seats contested	Total votes	Voting Percentage	Outcome of election	Election leader
2018	0 / 222	26	37,708	0.31%	0 seat; No representation in Parliament	Lajim Ukin
2022	0 / 222	21	1,173	0.01%	0 seat; No representation in Parliament	Zainal Nasirudin
2028	0 / 222	21	1,173	0.01%	0 seat; No representation in Parliament (GRS)	Zainal Nasirudin

== State election results ==
Sabah State Legislative Assembly
Election	Votes		Seats			Position (Note: As part of electoral coalition.)	Status
Election	Count	%	Result	Won / contested	+/–	Position	Status
2018	17,713	2.1	0 / 60	0 / 26	Steady	4th (United Sabah Alliance)	No seats
2020	4,415	0.6	0 / 73	0 / 5	Steady	▼6th	No seats
2020	4,415	0.6	0 / 73	0 / 5	Steady	▼6th	GRS–PH (2022–2025) (Note: Defecting WARISAN assemblyman.)
2025	2,063	0.2	0 / 73	0 / 1	Steady	▲1st (Gabungan Rakyat Sabah)	No seats

== See also ==
- Politics of Malaysia
- List of political parties in Malaysia
