= Big tent =

Broad political party

A big-tent party, or catch-all party, is a political party having members covering a broad spectrum of beliefs. This is in contrast to other kinds of parties, which defend a determined ideology, seek voters who adhere to that ideology, and attempt to convince people towards it.

== Examples ==
=== Argentina ===
From its foundation the Justicialist Party has been a Peronist catch-all party, which focuses on the figure of Juan Perón and his wife Eva. Since Nestor Kirchner took the presidency in 2003, the party is considered as part of center-left coalition. It has divided into left-wing and right-wing factions, with left-wing populist Kirchnerists now dominating the party. Despite this, the right-wing faction still exists.

Juntos por el Cambio is an Argentine big tent political coalition. It was created in 2015 as Cambiemos. It is composed of Republican Proposal (centre-right), Civic Coalition ARI (centre) and Radical Civic Union (centre), with common goals to oppose Peronist parties. It is considered as part of center-right coalition.

=== Armenia ===
Following the 2018 Armenian parliamentary election, the My Step Alliance rose to power on an anti-corruption and pro-democracy platform. The alliance has been described as maintaining a big tent ideology, as the alliance did not support any one particular political position. Instead, it focused on strengthening Armenia's civil society and economic development.

=== Australia ===
The Liberal Party of Australia and its predecessors originated as an alliance of liberals and conservatives in opposition to the Australian Labor Party, beginning with the Commonwealth Liberal Party in 1909. This ideological distinction has endured to the present day, with the modern Liberal Party frequently described as a "broad church", a term popularised by former leader and Prime Minister John Howard. In this context, "broad church" is largely synonymous with "big tent". In the 21st century, the party is often characterised as having a "small-l liberal" wing and a conservative wing, which frequently come into conflict with each other. The party has historically found strong support primarily from the middle-class, though it has in recent decades appealed to socially conservative working-class voters.

=== Bangladesh ===
In Bangladesh Awami League's Grand Alliance (Bangladesh) and BNP's 20 Party Alliance forms coalition with a wide range of parties, thus being catch all parties.

=== Brazil ===
In Brazil, the Centrão (lit. 'big centre') is a term for a large bloc of political parties that do not have a specific or consistent ideological orientation, and focus on negotiating support for the government in exchange for positions, resources, and political influence. These parties tend to form the parliamentary base of different administrations, shifting positions as needed, and play a decisive role in forming majorities in the National Congress. The Brazilian Democratic Movement (MDB) is one of the oldest and most notable "Centrão" and Big Tent parties in Brazil; despite being Brazil's largest party, both in number of members and number of officials elected, it has never elected a President, but has used its position as the largest party as a "bargaining chip" for privileges and advantages. MDB was founded in 1965 at the start of the Brazilian military dictatorship as part of an enforced two-party system by the dictatorship, in which the only allowed parties were National Renewal Alliance Party (ARENA), a catch-all party representing the interests of the dictatorship, and MDB, formed to represent a wide-range moderate and less radical opposition to the dictatorship, without a clear program except the democratization of the country.

Brazil also has a number of minor parties known as "Rental Parties" (Portuguese: Partido de Aluguel), or "dwarf parties" (Portuguese: Partidos Nanicos), that generally have a "catch-all" alignment, with no electoral base of their own, existing primarily to negotiate political support, access to resources, or advertising time.

Other Big Tent centrão parties include the Progressists (PP), Brazilian Labour Party (PTB), We Can (PODE), Brazil Union (UB), Social Democratic Party (PSD), Social Christian Party (PSC), Act (AGIR), Patriot (PATRI), Forward (AVANTE), Solidarity (SD).

=== Canada ===
At the federal level, Canada has been dominated by two big tent parties practicing "brokerage politics." (Note: Brokerage politics: "A Canadian term for successful big tent parties that embody a pluralistic catch-all approach to appeal to the median Canadian voter... adopting centrist policies and electoral coalitions to satisfy the short-term preferences of a majority of electors who are not located on the ideological fringe.") Both the Liberal Party of Canada and the Conservative Party of Canada (and its predecessors) have attracted support from a broad spectrum of voters. Although parties such as the Quebec nationalist Bloc Québécois have elected members to the House of Commons, far-right and far-left parties have never gained a prominent force in Canadian society and have never formed a government in the Canadian Parliament.

=== Colombia ===
In Colombia, the presumed League of Anti-Corruption Governors, led by the former presidential candidate, sometimes referred to as "the Colombian Trump", has been described as a "catch-all party", although analysts agree that it belongs to a more or less authoritarian right-wing. That is to say to a type of extreme right.

=== Finland ===
The centre-right National Coalition Party has been described as catch-all party supporting the interests of the urban middle classes.

=== France ===
The Renaissance party (formerly La République En Marche!) founded by President Emmanuel Macron has been described as a centrist party with a catch-all nature.

=== Germany ===
Both the Christian Democratic Union of Germany/Christian Social Union in Bavaria (CDU/CSU) and the Social Democratic Party of Germany (SPD) are considered big tent or catch-all parties, known in German as Volksparteien ("people's parties").

=== India ===
The Indian National Congress attracted support from Indians of all classes, castes and religions supportive of Indian independence movement. Janata Party which came into power in India in 1977, was a catch-all party that consisted of people with different ideologies opposed to The Emergency. Since 2023 INC has led Indian National Developmental Inclusive Alliance against right-wing government of Narendra Modi. The alliance has been described as being "big tent" due to its inclusion of all anti-BJP parties from far-left to right-wing.

=== Ireland ===
Fine Gael and Fianna Fáil are considered catch-all parties and are supported by people from different social classes and political ideologies. The two parties are usually described as being very similar in their current and recent policies, both being positioned on the centre-right with a liberal-conservative ideology. The reasons for their remaining separate are mainly historical, with those who supported the Anglo-Irish Treaty in the 1920s eventually becoming Fine Gael and those who opposed the treaty having joined Fianna Fáil to seek an independent Ireland.

=== Italy ===
In Italy, the Five Star Movement, founded and formerly led by the comedian and actor Beppe Grillo, has been described as a catch-all protest party and "post-ideological big tent" because its supporters do not share similar policy preferences, are split on major economic and social issues and are united largely based on "anti-establishment" sentiments. The Five Star Movement's "successful campaign formula combined anti-establishment sentiments with an economic and political protest which extends beyond the boundaries of traditional political orientations", but its "'catch-all' formula" has limited its ability to become "a mature, functional, effective and coherent contender for government".

=== Japan ===
The New Frontier Party, which existed from 1994 to 1997, was considered a big political party because it was created to oppose the Liberal Democratic Party by people of various ideologies, including social democrats, liberals, neoliberals, Buddhist democrats, and conservatives.

The former main centre-left opposition, the Democratic Party of Japan (DPJ), was Japan's version of third way politics and served since the mid-1990s as a ‘big tent party’ for a plethora of heterogeneous groups ranging from two socialist parties to liberal and conservative groups.

=== Mexico ===
The Institutional Revolutionary Party (PRI) held power in Mexico for 71 uninterrupted years, from 1929 to 2000. It was founded after the Mexican Revolution by Mexican president Plutarco Elías Calles. Then known as the National Revolutionary Party, it was founded with the intent of providing a political space to allow all surviving leaders and combatants of the Mexican Revolution to participate and to resolve the grave political crisis that had been caused by the assassination of President-elect Álvaro Obregón in 1928. Throughout its nine-decade existence, the PRI has adopted a vast array of ideologies, which have often been determined by the president of the republic in office at the time. The party nationalized the petroleum industry in 1938 and the banking industry in 1982. In the 1980s, the party went through reforms that shaped its current incarnation, with policies characterized as centre-right, such as the privatization of state-run companies, closer relations with the Catholic Church, and embracing free-market capitalism and neoliberal policies.

The National Regeneration Movement, founded by Andrés Manuel López Obrador, has often been described as a big-tent party because of the various constituents who joined its ranks during the 2018 Mexican general elections. Juntos Hacemos Historia is a big-tent alliance led by the National Regeneration Movement that contested the 2021 Mexican legislative election. The successor alliance, Sigamos Haciendo Historia, has been described by some political scientists as catch-all.

The Ecologist Green Party of Mexico has often been described in terms of catch all politics. AP News describes it as a "strange political group" that almost always joins the governing party's coalition to maintain influence. According to Muñoz Patraca, a professor of political science at UNAM, the PVEM is not a political party like other movements in favor of democratization, or economic or social struggles. Rather, the party serves, in name only, to concerns about the environment - escaping the traditional left-right ideological axis. Miguel Ángel Toro, the Director of the Bachelor's Degree in Government and Public Transformation at Tecnológico de Monterrey, describes the party as a "party that has no ideology... It’s been with parties who are on the right, center, and the left.” Critically, Toro says, “the big parties overestimate the votes the Partido Verde can bring in, so the party always ends up with more seats than they would have gotten. That gives the Green Party more life than it should have.”

=== Pakistan ===
The Pakistan Tehreek-e-Insaf was founded in 1996 as a centre-right, anti-corruption populist party, PTI has increasingly adopted a "big tent" approach to broaden its electoral base. It pulls in diverse groups from urban middle-class professionals to rural voters and conservative factions all united by support for former Prime Minister Imran Khan.

=== Portugal ===
The centre-left Socialist Party (PS) and centre-right Social Democratic Party (PSD) have been described as catch-all parties.

=== Republic of China ===
The Kuomintang (KMT), the ruling party of the Republic of China (1912–1949), operated as a catch-all party encompassing a wide ideological spectrum, from the "diehard Right" to the "pink Left." However, following its defeat in the Chinese Civil War and the Great Retreat in 1949, the KMT in Taiwan gradually transitioned into a more consolidated conservative right-wing party.

=== Romania ===
Romania's Social Democratic Party has been referred to as a catch-all party. Political analyst Radu Magdin described it in December 2016 as having conservative values, while being economically liberal, and espousing left-leaning rhetoric on public policies.

=== South Africa ===
The African National Congress (ANC) has been the governing party of South Africa since the country's first democratic election, in 1994, and it has been described by the media as a "big tent" party. An important aspect of its electoral success has been its ability to include a diverse range of political groups most notably in the form of the Tripartite Alliance between the ANC; the South African Communist Party; and the country's largest trade union, COSATU. Additional interest groups in the party are members of the business community and traditional leaders.

=== Spain ===
Citizens (Spanish: Ciudadanos) has been considered as an example of astroturfing in the Spanish media since 2015. Originally founded as a social-democratic regional party opposed to Catalan nationalism, the party switched to a catch-all message to attract votes from the right to the moderate left in the party's appearance in the national political landscape. Its stance includes a mix of liberalism and pro-Europeanism, but the party has also embraced populist views on the legitimacy of its political opponents; conservative views on topics such as the criminal system and personal property and Spanish nationalist positions. It has become one of the most recognisable catch-all parties in the history of the country. In the mid-2010s, however, the party's main ideology is perceived to have drifted towards the right, with Albert Rivera admitting that it would not agree to form a coalition with the two main centre-left and left parties after the April 2019 Spanish general election, regardless of the results. Furthermore, some commentators argue that Ciudadanos was attempting to supplant the People's Party, which suffered massive losses as the hegemonic party of the right and thus contributed to the shift in Ciudadanos to the right. Similarly, Ciudadanos has allied with both the conservative People's Party and the far-right Vox to achieve coalitions in regional parliaments. That has given rise to the expression "the three rights" or colloquially "El Trifachito" to describe the grouping, which defines its opposition as "the left".

=== United Kingdom ===
When Gordon Brown became the prime minister of the United Kingdom in 2007, he invited several members from outside the Labour Party into his government. They included former CBI Director-General Digby Jones who became a Minister of State and former Liberal Democrats leader Paddy Ashdown who was offered the position of Northern Ireland Secretary (Ashdown turned down the offer). The media often referred to Brown's ministry as "a government of all the talents" or simply "Brown's big tent".

All for Unity was a big tent anti-SNP electoral alliance that contested the 2021 Scottish Parliament election but failed to win any seats.

=== United States ===
The Democratic Party was a "big-tent" party during the New Deal coalition, which was formed to support President Franklin D. Roosevelt's New Deal policies from the 1930s to the 1960s. The coalition brought together labor unions, working-class voters, lower-middle class voters, farm organizations, secular liberals, Southern Democrats, African Americans, urban voters, and immigrants.

After the 1974 Dallas Accord, the Libertarian Party embraced the big-tent idea to the extent it ensured that the anarcho-capitalist views would not be excluded from the majority minarchist party.

The Libertarian Socialist Caucus of the Democratic Socialists of America identifies DSA as a "big tent" organization amongst the American left, as individual members are aligned with a wide range of socialist ideologies, including social democracy, democratic socialism, the democratic road to socialism, Trotskyism, Marxism–Leninism, and anarchism.

== Other examples ==
- ANO 2011, Czech Republic
- Austrian People's Party
- Awami League, Bangladesh
- Brazilian Democratic Movement, Brazil
- Christian Democracy, Italy (1943–1994)
- Christian Democratic Union of Germany
- Civic Platform, Poland
- Democratic Party, United States
- Democratic Party of Socialists of Montenegro
- Fianna Fáil, Republic of Ireland
- Five Star Movement, Italy
- Georgian Dream
- Indian National Congress
- Institutional Revolutionary Party, Mexico
- Islamic Iran Participation Front
- Joint List, Israel
- Labour Party, United Kingdom
- Labour Party, Lithuania
- La République En Marche!, France
- Liberal Party, Canada
- Liberal Democratic Party, Japan
- National Coalition Party, Finland
- National Liberation Front, Algeria
- National Regeneration Movement, Mexico
- Nuevas Ideas, El Salvador
- People's Front for Democracy and Justice, Eritrea
- Progressive Conservative Party of Canada
- Republican Party of Armenia, Armenia
- Scottish National Party, Scotland
- Serbian Progressive Party
- Social Democratic Party, Portugal
- Social Democratic Party of Germany
- Socialist Party, Portugal
- South Tyrolean People's Party, Italy
- Together for Yes, Ireland
- Together for Yes, Spain
- Chama Cha Mapinduzi, Tanzania
- United Russia, Russia
- Barisan Nasional, Malaysia
- Pakatan Harapan, Malaysia
- Perikatan Nasional, Malaysia
- Pakatan Rakyat, Malaysia
- United Borneo Alliance, State of Sabah and State of Sarawak, Malaysia
- United Sabah Alliance, State of Sabah, Malaysia
- The United Alliance of State, Malaysia
- Gabungan Rakyat Sabah, State of Sabah, Malaysia
- Gabungan Parti Sarawak, State of Sarawak, Malaysia
- Gerakan Tanah Air (GTA), Malaysia
- Parti Impian Sabah, State of Sabah, Malaysia
- White Movement, Russian State

== See also ==
- Bipartisanship
- Broad church
- Elite party
- Party of power
- Popular front
- Purity test (politics), a rigid standard on a specific issue by which a politician is judged
- Syncretic politics
- United front
