= Jonnybone J Kurum =

Malaysian politician (born 1976)

Yang Berhormat Datuk Jonnybone J Kurum PGDK AMN MLA

State Assistant Minister of Industry, Entrepreneurship and Transport of Sabah
- Incumbent
- Assumed office 2 December 2025
- Governor: Musa Aman
- Chief Minister: Hajiji Noor
- State Minister: Ewon Benedick
- Preceded by: Andi Suryady (as Assistant Minister of Industrial Development and Entrepreneurship)
- Constituency: Telupid

Political Secretary to the Minister in the Prime Minister's Department (Sabah and Sarawak Affairs)
- In office 27 September 2021 – 24 November 2022
- Prime Minister: Ismail Sabri Yaakob
- Minister: Maximus Ongkili
- Preceded by: Christoper Mandut
- Succeeded by: Mohammad Ghazali Hajiji

Member of the Sabah State Legislative Assembly for Telupid
- Incumbent
- Assumed office 9 October 2020
- Preceded by: constituency established
- Majority: 685 (2020); 1,011 (2025)

Vice President of the United Sabah Party (Non-Muslim Bumiputera)
- Incumbent
- Assumed office 27 September 2026 Serving with: Hendrus Anding (Non-Muslim Bumiputera) &; Sahrol Mahoolop (Muslim Bumiputera) &; Mursid Mohd Rais (Muslim Bumiputera) &; Arthur Sen Siong Choo (Chinese)
- President: Joachim Gunsalam
- Preceded by: Johnny Mositun

Assistant Secretary-General of the United Sabah Party
- In office 1 July 2022 – 26 September 2026
- President: Maximus Ongkili (2022–2024); Joachim Gunsalam (Acting) (2024–2026)
- Secretary-General: Julita Mojungki
- Preceded by: Hendrus Anding

Personal details
- Born: Jonnybone J Kurum; 13 November 1976 (age 49) Telupid, Sandakan Division, Sabah, Malaysia
- Citizenship: Malaysia
- Party: United Sabah Party (PBS)
- Other political affiliations: Gabungan Rakyat Sabah
- Occupation: Politician
- Jonnybone J Kurum on Facebook

Jonnybone J Kurum is a Malaysian politician who has served as Assistant Minister of Industry, Entrepreneurship and Transport of Sabah in the Gabungan Rakyat Sabah (GRS) state administration under Chief Minister Hajiji Noor and Minister Ewon Benedick since December 2025 and Member of Sabah State Legislative Assembly (MLA) for Telupid since September 2020. He is a member and one of the Vice Presidents for the Non-Muslim Bumiputera quota of the United Sabah Party (PBS) a component party of the Gabungan Rakyat Sabah (GRS) coalition.

== Political career ==
Jonnybone J Kurum has served as Political Secretary to the Minister in the Prime Minister's Department in charge of Sabah and Sarawak Affairs, Maximus Ongkili from 27 September 2021 until 2022 and Political Secretary I of the Minister of Local Government and Housing of Sabah, Joachim Gunsalam.

== Election results ==
Sabah State Legislative Assembly
| Year | Constituency | Candidate | Votes | Pct | Opponent(s) | Votes | Pct | Ballots cast | Majority | Turnout |
|---|---|---|---|---|---|---|---|---|---|---|
| 2020 | N47 Telupid | Jonnybone J Kurum (PBS) | 2,266 | 41.42% | Felix Joseph Sitin (UPKO) | 1,581 | 28.90% | 5,471 | 685 | 68.15% |
| 2020 | N47 Telupid | Jonnybone J Kurum (PBS) | 2,266 | 41.42% | Abdul Wahab Abdul Ghani (Sabah UMNO) | 1,389 | 25.39% | 5,471 | 685 | 68.15% |
| 2020 | N47 Telupid | Jonnybone J Kurum (PBS) | 2,266 | 41.42% | Jingkoi Luna (PCS) | 68 | 1.24% | 5,471 | 685 | 68.15% |
| 2020 | N47 Telupid | Jonnybone J Kurum (PBS) | 2,266 | 41.42% | Takun Ladas (LDP) | 54 | 0.99% | 5,471 | 685 | 68.15% |
| 2020 | N47 Telupid | Jonnybone J Kurum (PBS) | 2,266 | 41.42% | Rita Cham (PPRS) | 19 | 0.35% | 5,471 | 685 | 68.15% |
| 2025 | N47 Telupid | Jonnybone J Kurum (PBS) | 3,868 | 37.61% | Felix Joseph Saang (UPKO) | 2,857 | 27.78% | 10,284 | 1,011 | 68.72% |
| 2025 | N47 Telupid | Jonnybone J Kurum (PBS) | 3,868 | 37.61% | Benedict Asmat (Sabah UMNO) | 1,687 | 16.40% | 10,284 | 1,011 | 68.72% |
| 2025 | N47 Telupid | Jonnybone J Kurum (PBS) | 3,868 | 37.61% | Simah Matusip (WARISAN) | 806 | 7.84% | 10,284 | 1,011 | 68.72% |
| 2025 | N47 Telupid | Jonnybone J Kurum (PBS) | 3,868 | 37.61% | Jikmariya Muran (STAR) | 345 | 3.35% | 10,284 | 1,011 | 68.72% |
| 2025 | N47 Telupid | Jonnybone J Kurum (PBS) | 3,868 | 37.61% | Michel Alok (IMPIAN) | 291 | 2.83% | 10,284 | 1,011 | 68.72% |
| 2025 | N47 Telupid | Jonnybone J Kurum (PBS) | 3,868 | 37.61% | Jamin Jamri (Sabah BERSATU) | 254 | 2.47% | 10,284 | 1,011 | 68.72% |
| 2025 | N47 Telupid | Jonnybone J Kurum (PBS) | 3,868 | 37.61% | Nilis Joseph (KDM) | 125 | 1.22% | 10,284 | 1,011 | 68.72% |
| 2025 | N47 Telupid | Jonnybone J Kurum (PBS) | 3,868 | 37.61% | Pagrios @ Petrus Zabang (PBM) | 51 | 0.50% | 10,284 | 1,011 | 68.72% |

== Honours ==
- Malaysia
  - Member of the Order of the Defender of the Realm (AMN) (2015)
- Sabah
  - Commander of the Order of Kinabalu (PGDK) – Datuk (2023)
  - Companion of the Order of Kinabalu (ASDK) (2021)
