= Julita Mojungki =

Malaysian politician

Yang Berhormat Datuk Julita Mojungki PGDK BSK MLA

State Minister of Women, Health and Community Wellbeing of Sabah
- Incumbent
- Assumed office 1 December 2025
- Governor: Musa Aman
- Deputy: Rina Jainal
- Chief Minister: Hajiji Noor
- Preceded by: James Ratib (as Minister of Community Development and People's Wellbeing)
- Constituency: Matunggong

State Assistant Minister of Finance of Sabah
- In office 26 October 2022 – 30 November 2025 Serving with: Jasnih Daya (2022–2023) &; Tan Lee Fatt (2023–2025)
- Minister: Hajiji Noor (2022–2023); Masidi Manjun (2023–2025)
- Governor: Juhar Mahiruddin (2022–2025); Musa Aman (since 2025)
- Chief Minister: Hajiji Noor
- Preceded by: Nizam Abu Bakar Titingan
- Succeeded by: Mohd Ishak Ayub
- Constituency: Matunggong

State Assistant Minister of Community Development and People's Wellbeing of Sabah
- In office 8 October 2020 – 26 October 2022 Serving with Flovia Ng
- Minister: Shahelmey Yahya
- Governor: Juhar Mahiruddin
- Chief Minister: Hajiji Noor
- Constituency: Matunggong

Member of the Sabah State Legislative Assembly for Matunggong
- Incumbent
- Assumed office 9 May 2018
- Preceded by: Jelani Dasanap (Independent)
- Majority: 1,687 (2018); 1,510 (2020); 334 (2025)

Secretary-General of the United Sabah Party
- Incumbent
- Assumed office 1 July 2022
- President: Maximus Ongkili (2022–2024); Joachim Gunsalam (Acting) (since 2024)
- Assistant: Jonnybone J Kurum; Hendrus Anding
- Preceded by: Joniston Bangkuai

Information Chief of the United Sabah Party
- In office 4 January 2021 – 30 June 2022
- President: Maximus Ongkili
- Assistant: Jonnybone J Kurum
- Preceded by: Joniston Bangkuai
- Succeeded by: Joniston Bangkuai

Personal details
- Born: Julita Mojungki; 8 January 1971 (age 55) Kudat, Sabah, Malaysia
- Party: People's Justice Party (until 2014); United Sabah Party (PBS) (since 2014)
- Other political affiliations: Pakatan Rakyat (PR) (–2014); Barisan Nasional (BN) (2014–2018); Gabungan Rakyat Sabah (GRS) (since 2020)
- Spouse(s): Wilfred Jublee (born 24 November 1973)
- Occupation: Politician

Julita Mojungki (born 8 January 1971) is a Malaysian politician who has served as State Minister of Women, Health and Community Wellbeing of Sabah in the Gabungan Rakyat Sabah (GRS) state administration under Chief Minister Hajiji Noor since December 2025, State Assistant Minister of Finance of Sabah under Ministers Hajiji Noor and Masidi Manjun from October 2022 until November 2025 and State Assistant Minister of Community Development and People's Wellbeing of Sabah under Minister Shahelmey Yahya from October 2020 to October 2022, as well as Member of Sabah State Legislative Assembly (MLA) for Matunggong since May 2018. She is a member of the United Sabah Party (PBS), a component party of the GRS coalition and was a member of the People's Justice Party (PKR), a component party of formerly the Pakatan Rakyat (PR) coalition. She has also served as the Secretary-General of PBS since July 2022 and Information Chief of PBS from January 2021 to July 2022.

== Election results ==
Sabah State Legislative Assembly
Year	Constituency	Candidate	Votes	Pct	Opponent(s)	Votes	Pct	Ballots cast	Majority	Turnout
2018	N04 Matunggong	Julita Mojungki (PBS)	6,946	41.80%	Sazalye Donol Abdullah (PKR)	5,259	31.64%	17,248	1,687	75.30%
2018	N04 Matunggong	Julita Mojungki (PBS)	6,946	41.80%	Marunsai Dawai (STAR)	2,968	17.86%	17,248	1,687	75.30%
2018	N04 Matunggong	Julita Mojungki (PBS)	6,946	41.80%	Jornah Mozihim (PCS)	1,348	8.11%	17,248	1,687	75.30%
2018	N04 Matunggong	Julita Mojungki (PBS)	6,946	41.80%	Rahim Madhakong (PKS)	98	0.59%	17,248	1,687	75.30%
2020	N05 Matunggong	Julita Mojungki (PBS)	4,369	39.09%	Richard Kastum (PBRS)	2,859	25.58%	11,176	1,510	65.31%
2020	N05 Matunggong	Julita Mojungki (PBS)	4,369	39.09%	Sazalye Donol Abdullah (PKR)	1,680	15.03%	11,176	1,510	65.31%
2020	N05 Matunggong	Julita Mojungki (PBS)	4,369	39.09%	Paul Porodong (IND)	1,069	9.57%	11,176	1,510	65.31%
2020	N05 Matunggong	Julita Mojungki (PBS)	4,369	39.09%	Sarapin Magana (PCS)	843	7.54%	11,176	1,510	65.31%
2020	N05 Matunggong	Julita Mojungki (PBS)	4,369	39.09%	Hibin Masalin (GAGASAN)	223	2.00%	11,176	1,510	65.31%
2020	N05 Matunggong	Julita Mojungki (PBS)	4,369	39.09%	Ronald Tampasok (IND)	82	0.73%	11,176	1,510	65.31%
2020	N05 Matunggong	Julita Mojungki (PBS)	4,369	39.09%	Joseff Emmanuel (IND)	51	0.46%	11,176	1,510	65.31%
2025	N05 Matunggong	Julita Mojungki (PBS)	9,096	47.25%	Wetrom Bahanda (KDM)	8,762	45.52%	19,469	334	66.80%
2025	N05 Matunggong	Julita Mojungki (PBS)	9,096	47.25%	Jornah Mozihim (WARISAN)	1,138	5.91%	19,469	334	66.80%
2025	N05 Matunggong	Julita Mojungki (PBS)	9,096	47.25%	J Ojilim Asam (IMPIAN)	133	0.69%	19,469	334	66.80%
2025	N05 Matunggong	Julita Mojungki (PBS)	9,096	47.25%	Ainin Ekon (IND)	75	0.39%	19,469	334	66.80%
2025	N05 Matunggong	Julita Mojungki (PBS)	9,096	47.25%	Freddy Chong Yee Vui (PKS)	45	0.23%	19,469	334	66.80%

== Honours ==
- Sabah
  - Commander of the Order of Kinabalu (PGDK) – Datuk (2020)
  - Grand Star of the Order of Kinabalu (BSK) (2011)
