= International Conference on the Malaysia Agreement =

- Abbreviation: ICMA
- Discipline: other related education fields

Publication details
- Publisher: the Borneo Heritage Foundation
- Frequency: annual

The International Conference on the Malaysia Agreement (ICMA) is an international conference project held in Kota Kinabalu, Sabah on 13 September 2013.

The Conference is sponsored and hosted by the Borneo Heritage Foundation, an organisation set up by Jeffrey Kitingan, and the Australian National University (ANU) College of Asia and the Pacific.
