= Jeffrey Kitingan =

Malaysian politician (born 1948)

Yang Berhormat Datuk Seri Panglima Jeffrey Kitingan PJN SPDK MP MLA JP
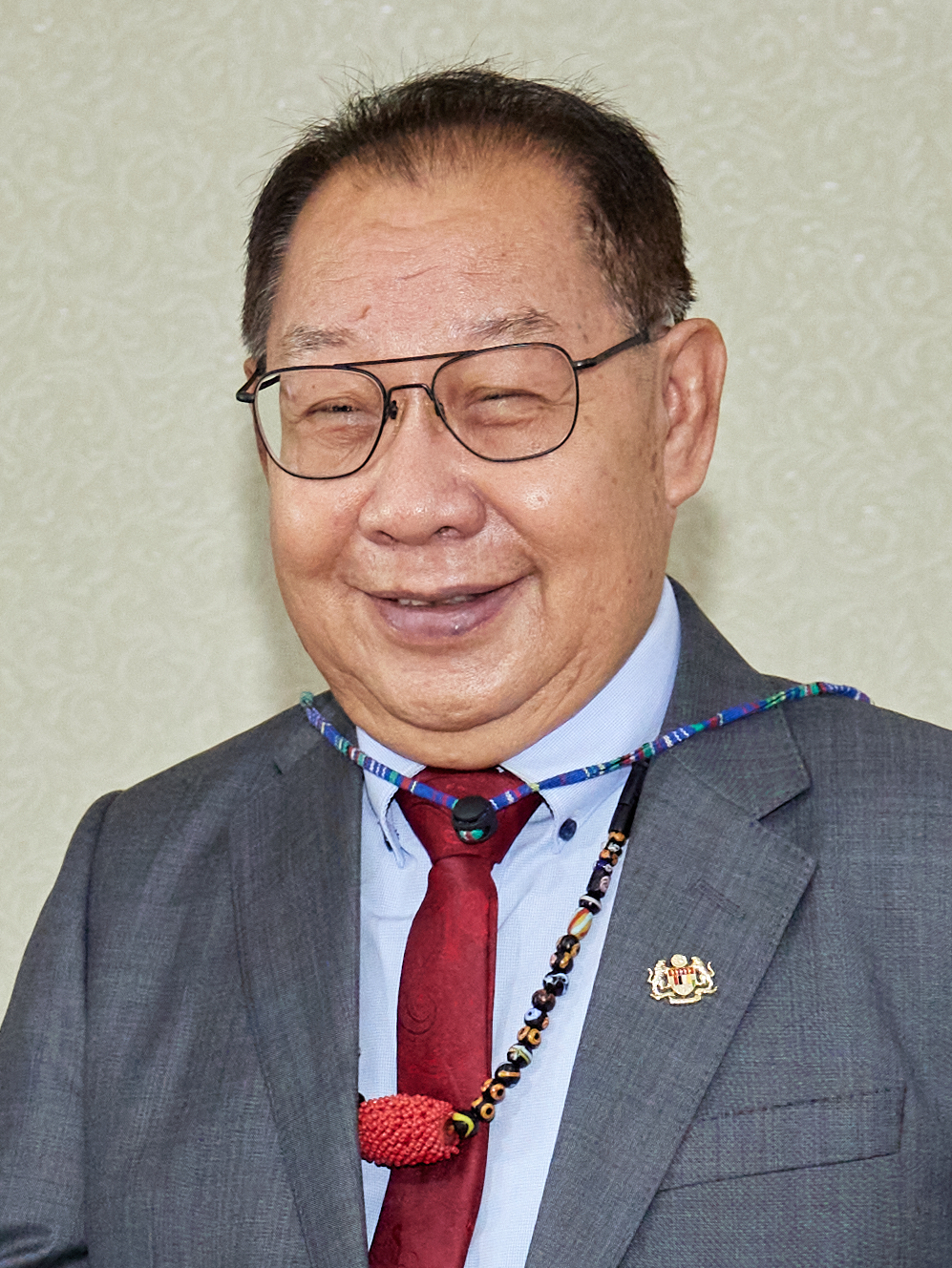
- Jeffrey in 2022

Federal Ministerial Roles
- 1994–1995: Deputy Minister of Housing and Local Government
- 2020: Deputy Minister of Tourism, Arts and Culture

Ministerial Roles (Sabah)
- 2018: Deputy Chief Minister
- 2018: Minister of Agriculture and Food Industries
- 2020–2023: Deputy Chief Minister II
- 2020–2023: Minister of Agriculture and Fisheries
- 2023–2025: Deputy Chief Minister I
- 2023–2025: Minister of Agriculture and Fisheries

Other roles
- 2018–2019: Leader of the Opposition of the Sabah State Legislative Assembly

Personal details
- Born: Gapari bin Katingan @ Geoffrey Kitingan; 22 October 1948 (age 78) Kota Marudu, Crown Colony of North Borneo (now Sabah, Malaysia)
- Party: United Sabah Party (PBS) (1990–1995; 1996–2001); People's Justice Front (AKAR) (1995–1996); Parti Bersatu Rakyat Sabah (PBRS) (2001–2003); People's Justice Party (PKR) (2006–2011); State Reform Party (STAR Sabah branch) (2011–2016); Homeland Solidarity Party (STAR) (since 2016)
- Other political affiliations: Gagasan Rakyat (GR) (1990–1996); Barisan Nasional (BN) (2001–2003); Pakatan Rakyat (PR) (2006–2011); United Sabah Alliance (USA) (2016–2018); Gabungan Bersatu Sabah (GBS) (2018–2020); Perikatan Nasional (PN) (2020–2022); Gabungan Rakyat Sabah (GRS) (2020–2025)
- Spouse(s): Cecilia Edwin Yatam-Kitingan (current); Susan Kitingan (separated)
- Relations: Joseph Pairin Kitingan (elder brother); Maximus Ongkili (nephew); James Peter Ongkili (nephew)
- Education: Harvard University (MA); Tufts University (PhD)
- Known for: Founder and first president of STAR Party in 2016

Jeffrey Kitingan

Faction represented in Dewan Rakyat
- 2018–2020: Homeland Solidarity Party
- 2020–2022: Perikatan Nasional
- 2022–2025: Gabungan Rakyat Sabah

Faction represented in Dewan Negara
- 1994–1996: Barisan Nasional
- 1996–1997: United Sabah Party

Faction represented in Sabah State Legislative Assembly
- 1994: United Sabah Party
- 1994–1996: Barisan Nasional
- 1996–2001: United Sabah Party
- 2001–2003: Barisan Nasional
- 2003–2004: Independent
- 2013–2018: State Reform Party
- 2018–2020: Homeland Solidarity Party
- 2020–2022: Perikatan Nasional
- 2023–2025: Gabungan Rakyat Sabah

Jeffrey Gapari Kitingan (born 22 October 1948) is a Malaysian politician who served as the Deputy Chief Minister of Sabah I from January 2023 to November 2025 and State Minister of Agriculture and Fisheries of Sabah for a second term from September 2020 to December 2025. He served as the Deputy Chief Minister of Sabah II from October 2020 to his promotion in January 2023 and the first term in the position in May 2018. In January 2023, he was appointed as the Deputy Chief Minister I of Sabah succeeding Bung Mokhtar, who was dropped due to a political crisis (but retained his ministerial portfolio). At the federal level, he served as the Deputy Minister of Tourism, Arts and Culture from March 2020 to his resignation in September 2020 and Deputy Minister of Housing and Local Government from August 1994 to May 1995. He has served as Member of Parliament (MP) for Keningau since May 2018, Member of the Sabah State Legislative Assembly (MLA) for Tambunan since May 2018 and Bingkor from 1994 to 2004 and again from May 2013 to May 2018. He has served and been founding President of the Homeland Solidarity Party (STAR), a component party of the ruling Gabungan Rakyat Sabah (GRS) and a former component party of the Perikatan Nasional (PN) coalition, since July 2016.

== Background ==
He was born in the town of Kota Marudu but hailed from the interior district of Tambunan. He graduated with a Master of Public Administration from Harvard University's John F. Kennedy School of Government. He has a PhD awarded in 1984 from the Fletcher School of Law and Diplomacy of Tufts University. His brother, Joseph Pairin Kitingan served as the Chief Minister of Sabah from 1985 to 1994.

== Political career ==
He is known to be a controversial politician, having been detained without trial under the Internal Security Act by the Barisan Nasional-controlled federal government under the leadership of then-Prime Minister, Mahathir Mohamad on suspicions of plotting to secede Sabah from the federation of Malaysia, although his defenders argue that this was a politically motivated move.

He is also known to have switched political parties a number of times. In 1990, he started his political career together with his brother Joseph Pairin Kitingan in Parti Bersatu Sabah (PBS). However, after the 1994 state election, he abandoned his brother and PBS to join the Angkatan Keadilan Rakyat (AKAR) party, leading to the downfall of the PBS government in Sabah. He tried to climb to the top post of the AKAR party but failed and rejoined PBS in 1996. However, in 1999, he quit PBS again and joined Parti Bersatu Rakyat Sabah (PBRS), tried to take over the party but failed again. He then quit the PBRS party in 2001 and tried to join United Pasokmomogun Kadazandusun Murut Organisation (UPKO). However, he quickly withdrew his membership application from UPKO and tried to join back PBS again for the third time, but PBS did not welcome him back into the party. In 2003, he applied to join the United Malays National Organisation (UMNO) twice: one through UMNO headquarters in Kuala Lumpur, but was rejected. He then applied another membership through UMNO Keningau branch in Sabah using his legal name "Gapari bin Kitingan @ Geoffrey Kitingan" and was mistakenly accepted by UMNO. Jeffrey was able to produce his UMNO membership card. However, once the UMNO supreme council realised their error, they immediately revoked Jeffrey's membership.

Jeffrey remained independent of any party until he was accepted into Parti Keadilan Rakyat (PKR) in 2006 where he became the vice-president of the party representing the East Malaysian quota. He resigned his vice-president post in 2009 but remained as a party member. In December 2010, Jeffrey founded a NGO named United Borneo Alliance (UBA), which aimed to strive the rights of Sabah and Sarawak in accordance to 20-point agreement and Malaysia Agreement. He finally quit the PKR party in January 2011. In 2012, Jeffrey launched the Sabah chapter of Sarawak-based State Reform Party (STAR). in 2015, he brought his UBA into United Sabah Alliance (USA), just before he brought his Sabah chapter out of the Sarawak-based STAR to establish a Sabah-based party named Homeland Solidarity Party (STAR) in 2016.

In the 2008 general election, he challenged his brother Tan Sri Datuk Seri Panglima Joseph Pairin from BN-PBS at the Keningau parliamentary constituency, but lost. Instead, he won the Sabah State Legislative constituency of Bingkor.

Jeffrey has been referred as political "frog" (katak in Malay) for his penchant of party hopping throughout his political career. Jeffrey responded by commenting that party hopping has been the common practice in Sabah politics. He defended himself that he switches parties in order to find the one that is suitable to fight for the rights of the Sabah people.

=== 2018 state election decision maker and subsequent results ===
Following the 2018 general election, the BN and the Pakatan Harapan (PH) coalition with Sabah Heritage Party (WARISAN) are tied up with 29-29 seats in the 2018 Sabah state election. Jeffrey with his party of Homeland Solidarity Party (STAR) under the United Sabah Alliance (USA) which are not aligned from either the two sides, has won two seats in the election and subsequently emerged as the decision maker for the formation of a state government from the two sides. He then decide to team up with the BN to form coalition state government with him appointed as a Deputy Chief Minister while Musa Aman from BN continue to become the Chief Minister for another 5 years under the new coalition government. His decision to maintain the position of BN in Sabah then drew many criticism from Sabahan residents who want to see a change under the administration of a new state government with many began to labelling him as a "traitor" towards the state, especially when he was once a staunch opposition towards BN rule before the election. It is also reported that before the election, Jeffrey has been issue with 7-days bankruptcy notice. Following his sudden decision to work with BN, the Sabah branch of PKR has urged the Malaysian Anti-Corruption Commission (MACC) to probe the two individuals, citing a “possibility of money changing hands between the two” that could leading to a sudden political partnership. Following the complaint, Prime Minister Mahathir Mohamad announced that they will not recognise the election in Sabah if corruption involved. Situation also change when six seats assemblymen from the BN allied party of UPKO switched their allegiance to WARISAN, giving the Shafie Apdal party an advantage with 35 seats which sufficient to establish a valid state government. In addition, the Sabah Yang di-Pertua Negeri (TYT) Juhar Mahiruddin also had requested Musa to step down from his position, as Musa current position has contravened the Article 7(1) of the Sabah State Constitution when he lost the total majority state seats. On 14 May 2018, a letter from TYT are being delivered to Musa residence which stating that he is no longer the Chief Minister effective from 12 May 2018.

During the 2020 Malaysian political crisis, Jeffrey supported Mahathir Mohamad to be reinstated as Prime Minister after his resignation.

=== 2020 state election ===
In the 2020 Sabah state election, he agreed to lead his party, STAR to join the Gabungan Rakyat Sabah (GRS) coalition in unseating the Warisan Plus coalition. This resulted in his party winning 6 seats in the state election, Jeffrey himself won the Tambunan seat. After winning the election, he was appointed as the Deputy Chief Minister II, serving with Bung Mokhtar as Deputy Chief Minister I and Joachim Gunsalam as Deputy Chief Minister III.

On the day of his appointment as Deputy Chief Minister II, he resigned as Deputy Minister of Tourism, Arts and Culture.

=== Carbon credit deal ===
In late 2021, Mongabay reported that Jeffrey was involved in a carbon credit deal that was signed in October 2021 that declared 2 million hectares as protected areas, without the consultation of indigenous peoples residing there. Civil society groups and indigenous leaders were critical over the secrecy of the agreement and whether the carbon accrediting company, Hoch Standard, had prior experience to implement it.

== Personal life ==
Jeffrey is currently married to Cecilia Edwin Yatam-Kitingan, a fellow native of Tambunan who hailed from a village named Kampung Monsok (for he was from another village known as Kampung Karanaan but has paternal ancestral roots through his father in Kampung Nouduh, as his mother is a native of Kampung Nambayan). His first wife Susan, from which he separated since the 2000s, is a Dusun from Keningau with mixed Caucasian/Eurasian (French/American/British) descent.

In January 2021, Jeffrey tested positive for COVID-19 and underwent treatment at Queen Elizabeth Hospital in Kota Kinabalu, Sabah. Both Jeffrey and his wife recovered and discharged from hospital after about two weeks later.

== Election results ==
Parliament of Malaysia
Year	Constituency	Candidate	Votes	Pct	Opponent(s)	Votes	Pct	Ballots cast	Majority	Turnout
1995	P147 Bandau	Jeffrey Kitingan (AKAR)	5,851	34.98%	Maximus Ongkili (PBS)	10,716	64.06%	16,927	4,865	69.72%
1995	P147 Bandau	Jeffrey Kitingan (AKAR)	5,851	34.98%	Jomilon Mojuntin (IND)	162	0.97%	16,927	4,865	69.72%
2008	P180 Keningau	Jeffrey Kitingan (PKR)	10,334	40.53%	Joseph Pairin Kitingan (PBS)	14,598	57.27%	25,956	4,264	72.96%
2008	P180 Keningau	Jeffrey Kitingan (PKR)	10,334	40.53%	Peter Kodou (DAP)	560	2.20%	25,956	4,264	72.96%
2013	P180 Keningau	Jeffrey Kitingan (STAR)	11,900	33.48%	Joseph Pairin Kitingan (PBS)	15,818	44.50%	36,098	3,918	82.73%
2013	P180 Keningau	Jeffrey Kitingan (STAR)	11,900	33.48%	Stephen Sandor (PKR)	7,825	22.02%	36,098	3,918	82.73%
2018	P180 Keningau	Jeffrey Kitingan (STAR)	13,286	33.09%^{2}	Jake Nointin (WARISAN)	13,241	32.98%^{2}	40,671	45	79.02%
2018	P180 Keningau	Jeffrey Kitingan (STAR)	13,286	33.09%^{2}	Daniel Kinsik (PBS)	12,742	31.74%^{2}	40,671	45	79.02%
2018	P180 Keningau	Jeffrey Kitingan (STAR)	13,286	33.09%^{2}	Jius Awang (PCS)	433	1.08%	40,671	45	79.02%
2018	P180 Keningau	Jeffrey Kitingan (STAR)	13,286	33.09%^{2}	Maimin Rijan (IND)	248	0.62%	40,671	45	79.02%
2018	P180 Keningau	Jeffrey Kitingan (STAR)	13,286	33.09%^{2}	Justin Guka (IND)	199	0.50%	40,671	45	79.02%
2022	P180 Keningau	Jeffrey Kitingan (STAR)	23,155	42.20%	Grelydia Gillod (DAP)	15,099	27.52%	55,542	8,056	62.65%
2022	P180 Keningau	Jeffrey Kitingan (STAR)	23,155	42.20%	Jake Nointin (KDM)	9,598	17.49%	55,542	8,056	62.65%
2022	P180 Keningau	Jeffrey Kitingan (STAR)	23,155	42.20%	Rasinin Kautis (WARISAN)	7,020	12.79%	55,542	8,056	62.65%
Notes: Table excludes votes for candidates who finished in third place or lower.^{2} Different % used for 2018 election.

Sabah State Legislative Assembly
Year	Constituency	Candidate	Votes	Pct	Opponent(s)	Votes	Pct	Ballots cast	Majority	Turnout
1994	N25 Bingkor	Jeffrey Kitingan (PBS)	6,408	68.57%	Injon Sedomon (PBRS)	2,249	24.07%	9,415	4,159	78.06%
1994	N25 Bingkor	Jeffrey Kitingan (PBS)	6,408	68.57%	Ayub Aman (IND)	688	7.36%	9,415	4,159	78.06%
1999	N28 Bingkor	Jeffrey Kitingan (PBS)	8,339	61.19%	Joseph Kurup (PBRS)	4,871	35.75%	13,744	3,468	72.30%
1999	N28 Bingkor	Jeffrey Kitingan (PBS)	8,339	61.19%	Kuilan Anggau (BERSEKUTU)	395	2.90%	13,744	3,468	72.30%
1999	N28 Bingkor	Jeffrey Kitingan (PBS)	8,339	61.19%	Peter Kodou (IND)	22	0.16%	13,744	3,468	72.30%
2004	N37 Sook	Jeffrey Kitingan (IND)	3,578	45.83%	Joseph Kurup (PBRS)	3,973	50.90%	7,984	395	70.53%
2004	N37 Sook	Jeffrey Kitingan (IND)	3,578	45.83%	Yapilin Nawawi (IND)	255	3.27%	7,984	395	70.53%
2008	N33 Bingkor	Jeffrey Kitingan (PKR)	4,418	47.51%	Justin Guka (UPKO)	4,589	49.34%	9,455	171	70.88%
2008	N33 Bingkor	Jeffrey Kitingan (PKR)	4,418	47.51%	Uling Anggan (IND)	164	1.76%	9,455	171	70.88%
2008	N33 Bingkor	Jeffrey Kitingan (PKR)	4,418	47.51%	Victor Leornadus (IND)	129	1.39%	9,455	171	70.88%
2013	N33 Bingkor	Jeffrey Kitingan (STAR)	5,350	42.05%	Kennedy Jie John (UPKO)	4,894	38.47%	12,908	456	81.40%
2013	N33 Bingkor	Jeffrey Kitingan (STAR)	5,350	42.05%	Ahmad Shah Hussein Tambakau (PKR)	2,368	18.61%	12,908	456	81.40%
2013	N33 Bingkor	Jeffrey Kitingan (STAR)	5,350	42.05%	Ricky Sedomon (IND)	111	0.87%	12,908	456	81.40%
2018	N32 Tambunan	Jeffrey Kitingan (STAR)	6,136	46.78%	Joseph Pairin Kitingan (PBS)	5,099	38.86%	13,322	1,037	82.00%
2018	N32 Tambunan	Jeffrey Kitingan (STAR)	6,136	46.78%	Justin Alip (WARISAN)	1,427	10.88%	13,322	1,037	82.00%
2018	N32 Tambunan	Jeffrey Kitingan (STAR)	6,136	46.78%	Nestor Joannes Linggohun (PCS)	456	3.48%	13,322	1,037	82.00%
2020	N39 Tambunan	Jeffrey Kitingan (STAR)	8,691	75.21%	Laurentius Nayan Yambu (UPKO)	1,899	16.44%	11,555	6,792	69.98%
2020	N39 Tambunan	Jeffrey Kitingan (STAR)	8,691	75.21%	Silverius Bruno (PBS)	439	3.80%	11,555	6,792	69.98%
2020	N39 Tambunan	Jeffrey Kitingan (STAR)	8,691	75.21%	Damian Richard Marcus Podtung (PCS)	326	2.82%	11,555	6,792	69.98%
2020	N39 Tambunan	Jeffrey Kitingan (STAR)	8,691	75.21%	Nordin Jaini (GAGASAN)	140	1.21%	11,555	6,792	69.98%
2020	N39 Tambunan	Jeffrey Kitingan (STAR)	8,691	75.21%	Jimmy Palikat (IND)	60	0.52%	11,555	6,792	69.98%
2025	N39 Tambunan	Jeffrey Kitingan (STAR)	12,595	65.79%	Victor P Paut (GAGASAN)	5,284	27.60%	19,144	7,311	66.15%
2025	N39 Tambunan	Jeffrey Kitingan (STAR)	12,595	65.79%	Bianus Kontong (WARISAN)	738	3.85%	19,144	7,311	66.15%
2025	N39 Tambunan	Jeffrey Kitingan (STAR)	12,595	65.79%	Jikol Tagua (KDM)	242	1.26%	19,144	7,311	66.15%
2025	N39 Tambunan	Jeffrey Kitingan (STAR)	12,595	65.79%	Dionysia Ginsos (ANAK NEGERI)	151	0.79%	19,144	7,311	66.15%
2025	N39 Tambunan	Jeffrey Kitingan (STAR)	12,595	65.79%	Gulit Rukang (SPP)	68	0.36%	19,144	7,311	66.15%
2025	N39 Tambunan	Jeffrey Kitingan (STAR)	12,595	65.79%	Kenneth Edwin (IMPIAN)	66	0.34%	19,144	7,311	66.15%

== Honours ==
=== Honours of Malaysia ===
- Malaysia
  - Recipient of the 17th Yang di-Pertuan Agong Installation Medal (2024)
  - Commander of the Order of Meritorious Service (PJN) – Datuk (2018)
- Sabah
  - Grand Commander of the Order of Kinabalu (SPDK) – Datuk Seri Panglima (2020)
  - Commander of the Order of Kinabalu (PGDK) – Datuk (1986)
  - Justice of the Peace (JP) (2022)

=== Kadazan, Dusun, Murut & Rungus (KDMR) tribes honours ===
- Huguan Siou Lundu Mirongod (2016)
  - On 15 December 2016, Jeffrey Kitingan was given the title of Huguan Siou Lundu Mirongod which means the brave paramount thinker of the tribe. The installation of this title was done by the keeper of the Adat or customs and traditions of the Kadazan-Dusun, Tindarama Bobolian Chief, OKK Aman Sirom Simbuna bin OT Tarantab in Kota Belud. This is the second highest honorific title in the Kadazan-Dusun tribe after Huguan Siou.
