= Gabungan Rakyat Sabah =

Ruling political alliance of the Sabah state, Malaysia

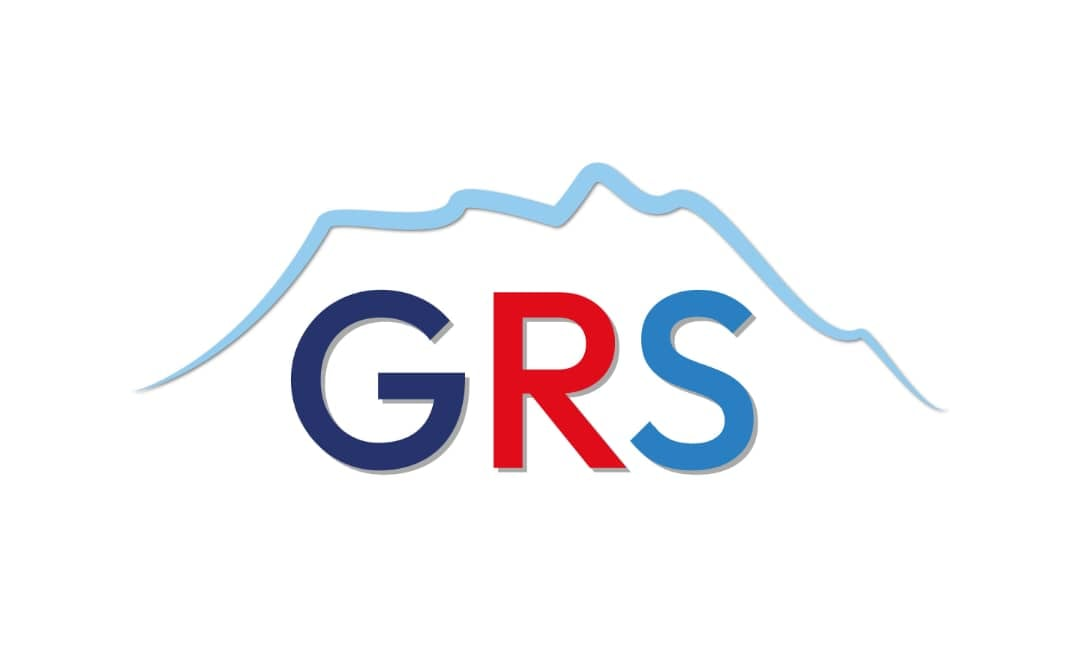
- English name: Sabah People's Coalition
- Abbreviation: GRS
- President: GRS Presidential Council (MPGRS)
- Chairman: Hajiji Noor
- Secretary-General: Armizan Mohd Ali
- Deputy Chairman: Masidi Manjun; Joachim Gunsalam; Anifah Aman; Liew Yun Fah; Chin Su Phin; Ewon Benedick
- Founder: Hajiji Noor
- Founded: 13 September 2020
- Legalised: 11 March 2022
- Split from: Perikatan Nasional (PN); Malaysian United Indigenous Party of Sabah (BERSATU Sabah)
- Preceded by: United Alliance of Sabah (GBS)
- Headquarters: Gabungan Rakyat Sabah Headquarters, GRS HQ, Lot 57 G7; Plaza Permai 2 Alamesra; 88400 Kota Kinabalu; Sabah
- Student wing: GRS Student Wing
- Ideology: Sabahan regionalism; Sabahan nationalism; Borneo multiracialism; 20-point agreement; Bumiputera interests; Sabah & Sarawak unity
- Political position: Centre to centre-right
- National affiliation: Perikatan Nasional (2020–2022); National Unity Government (since 2022)
- Regional affiliation: Pertubuhan Lima Generasi Sabah (PLG Sabah)
- Member parties: GAGASAN; PBS; UPKO; PHRS; LDP; PCS
- Colours: Steel Blue; Red; White; Old Glory Blue; Sky Blue
- Slogan: "Sayangi Sabah" (Love Sabah) "Sabah Maju Jaya" (Let Sabah Prosper) "Sabah First, Sabah Forward, Sabah Prosperous, Sabah United" (Sabah Diutamakan, Sabah Ke Hadapan, Sabah Sejahtera, Sabah Bersatu)
- Dewan Negara: 3 / 70
- Dewan Rakyat (Sabah and Labuan seats): 7 / 26
- Sabah State Legislative Assembly: 36 / 79
- Chief Minister of Sabah: 1 / 1

Election symbol
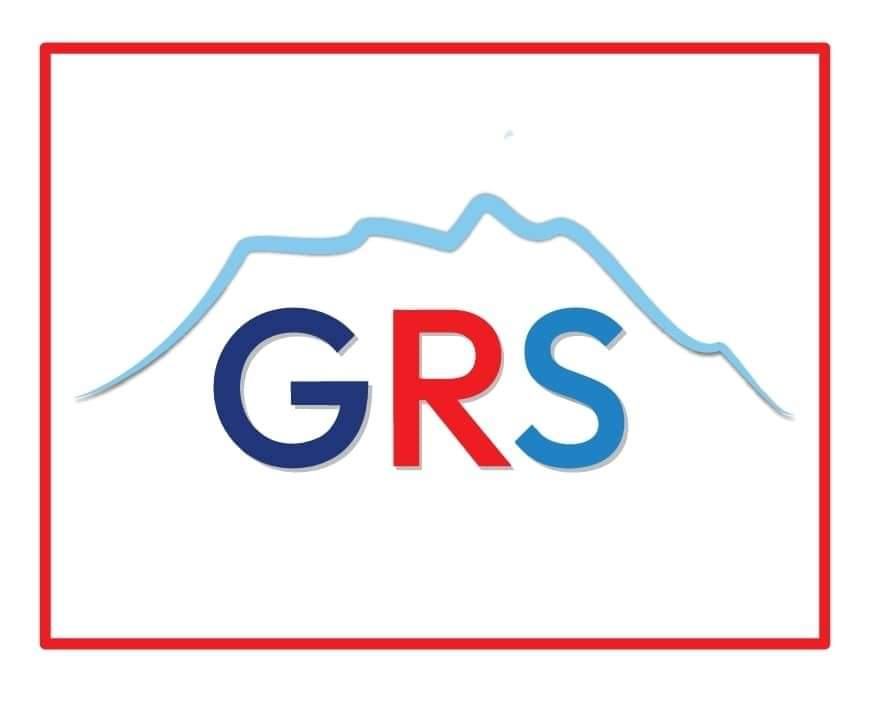

Party flag
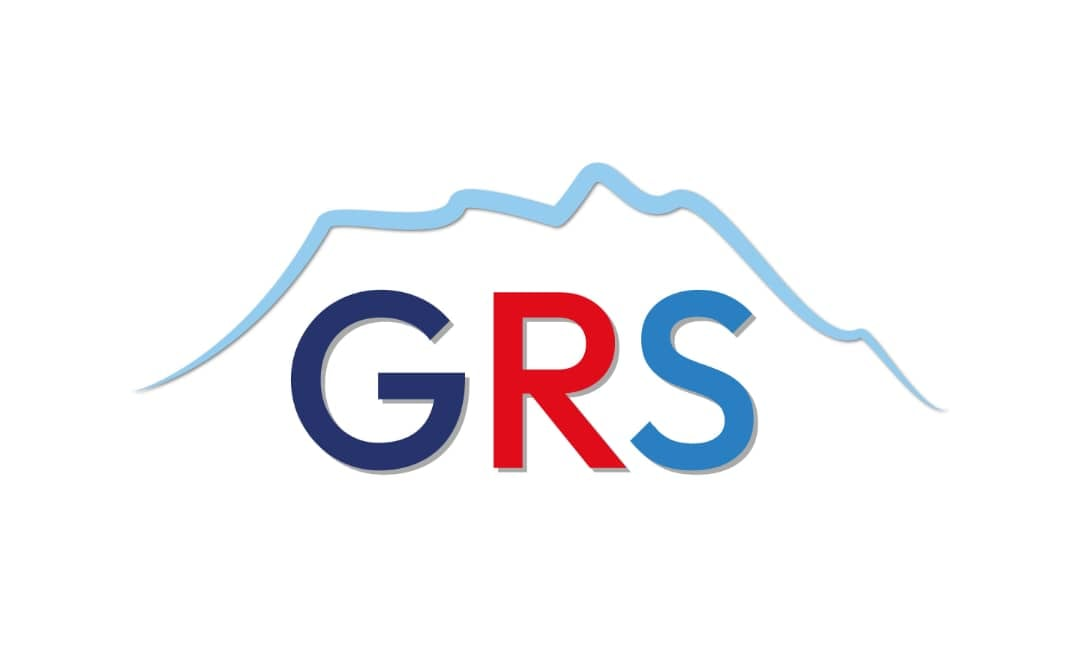

Website
- https://gabunganrakyatsabah.my/

Gabungan Rakyat Sabah (GRS; English: Sabah People's Coalition) is a Malaysian coalition of Sabah-based parties. It was established in 2020 and then registered in 2022 by former United Alliance of Sabah (GBS) and United Borneo Alliance (UBA) component parties operating solely in Sabah inspired by the formula of Sarawak-based coalition, Gabungan Parti Sarawak (GPS). Gabungan Rakyat Sabah gained significant popularity among Sabahans with a regionalist political outlook.

== History ==
=== Foundation ===
On 12 September 2020, Hajiji Noor established an informal alliance named Gabungan Rakyat Sabah (GRS) to compete against Shafie Apdal's ruling Warisan Plus coalition consisting of Sabah Heritage Party (WARISAN), the Democratic Action Party (DAP), Parti Keadilan Rakyat (PKR), and the United Progressive Kinabalu Organisation (UPKO) during the 2020 Sabah state election. The GRS alliance consisted of Hajiji's Perikatan Nasional Sabah (PN) coalition, the Barisan Nasional (BN) coalition, and Parti Bersatu Sabah (PBS).

During the Sabah state election held on 26 September, the alliance won a simple majority in the Sabah State Legislative Assembly, total of 38 seats: 17 from Perikatan Nasional, 14 from Barisan Nasional, and seven from PBS. Sabah Perikatan Nasional chairman Hajiji Noor became the new Chief Minister of Sabah on 29 September.

Under the new GRS administration, projects that had been stopped by the previous Sabah government were restarted and continued, including the Sabah Pan-Borneo Highway Project, Recognition project of Anjung Kinabalu KK Night Market and the development project of The Skybridge City Centre Kota Kinabalu.

On 9 January 2021, the various leaders of Gabungan Rakyat Sabah signed a memorandum of understanding affirming each party's commitment to the alliance, with chief minister Hajiji Noor maintaining that the alliance would remain intact regardless of the political situation on the peninsula.

=== Registration and expansion ===
On 24 November 2021, the alliance's backbenchers club chairperson Salleh Said Keruak floated the idea of registering Gabungan Rakyat Sabah as an official political coalition, arguing it was necessary as a means of strengthening the alliance. The proposal received the support of various party leaders, including Jeffrey G. Kitingan, Masidi Manjun, Yong Teck Lee, Bung Mokhtar Radin, Joniston Bangkuai and Joseph Pairin Kitingan.

The alliance was officially registered and legalised by the Registrar of Societies on 11 March 2022, with Sabah BERSATU, PBS, Homeland Solidarity Party (STAR), and the Sabah Progressive Party (SAPP) as its members.

On 9 May 2022, the United Sabah National Organisation (Baru) (USNO Baru) was admitted as a member of the coalition.

On 25 September 2022, GRS chairman Hajiji Noor announced that the coalition would support Barisan Nasional candidates in the upcoming 2022 Malaysian general election, contrary to Perikatan Nasional, of which both Sabah BERSATU and STAR was a member, which had declared Barisan as its main enemy.

=== Mass defections from Sabah BERSATU ===
Malaysian United Indigenous Party of Sabah, the regional branch of the Malaysian United Indigenous Party, otherwise known as BERSATU, effectively collapsed when all eleven state legislative assemblymen including the party's state chairman Hajiji Noor, and four members of parliament left the party on 10 December 2022. Rumours surfaced that the former members of Sabah BERSATU would take over Parti Gagasan Rakyat Sabah (GAGASAN), which came to pass as Hajiji Noor took over the party on 29 January 2023, with the party itself having been admitted into the coalition earlier on 9 December.

Political analysts regarded Hajiji Noor's decision to leave Sabah BERSATU as a shrewd, with Romzi Ationg commenting that the transformation of the Gabungan Rakyat Sabah coalition into a purely Sabah-based entity had been long-awaited by the local population.

However, as a result of the parliamentary anti-hopping law, the four former Sabah BERSATU members of parliament could not join Parti Gagasan Rakyat Sabah. They instead became direct members of the coalition.

=== 2025 Sabah state election ===
In the lead up to the 2025 Sabah state election, GRS entered into a seat-sharing pact with Pakatan Harapan (PH). In opposition to this move, STAR and SAPP announced that they would contest under their own symbols rather than be bound by the agreed-upon seat allocation, resulting in the termination of their memberships in the coalition. Five state assemblymen from STAR left the party and joined GRS as direct members prior to the assembly's dissolution.

== Member parties ==
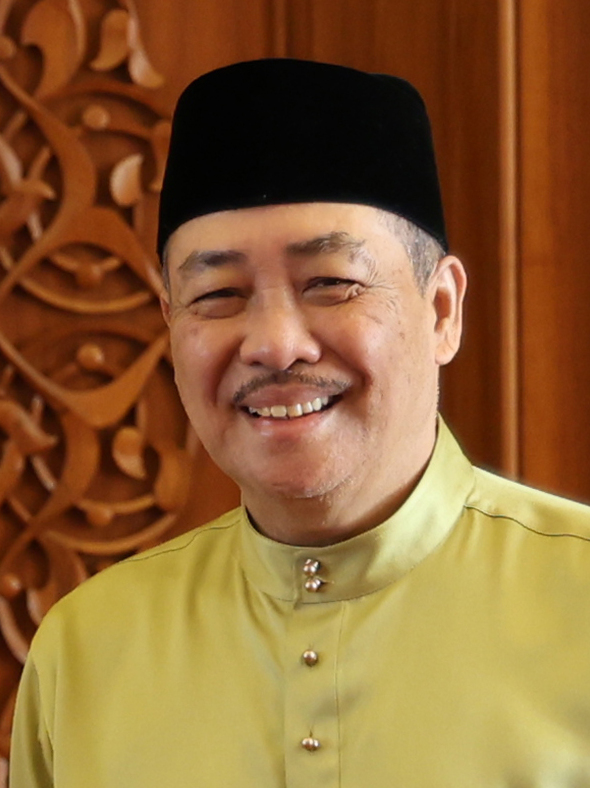
Hajiji Noor, the incumbent Chairman of Gabungan Rakyat Sabah (GRS) and President of the Parti Gagasan Rakyat Sabah (GAGASAN).

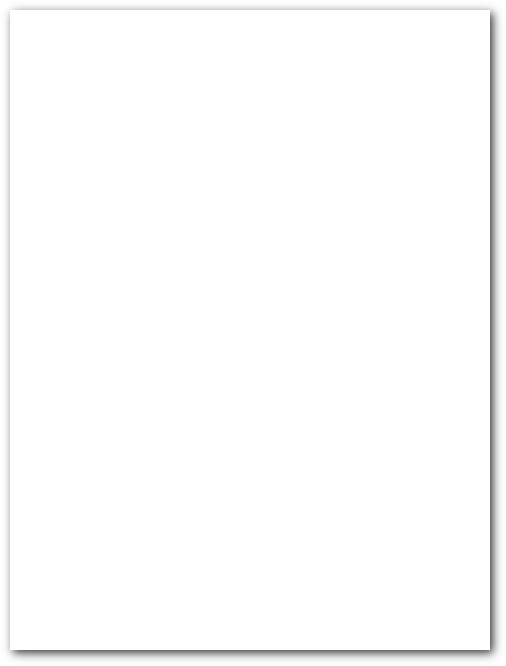
Joachim Gunsalam, President of the United Sabah Party (PBS).

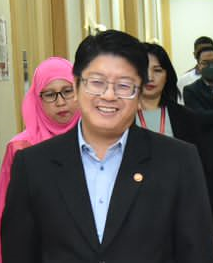
Ewon Benedick, President of the United Progressive Kinabalu Organisation (UPKO).

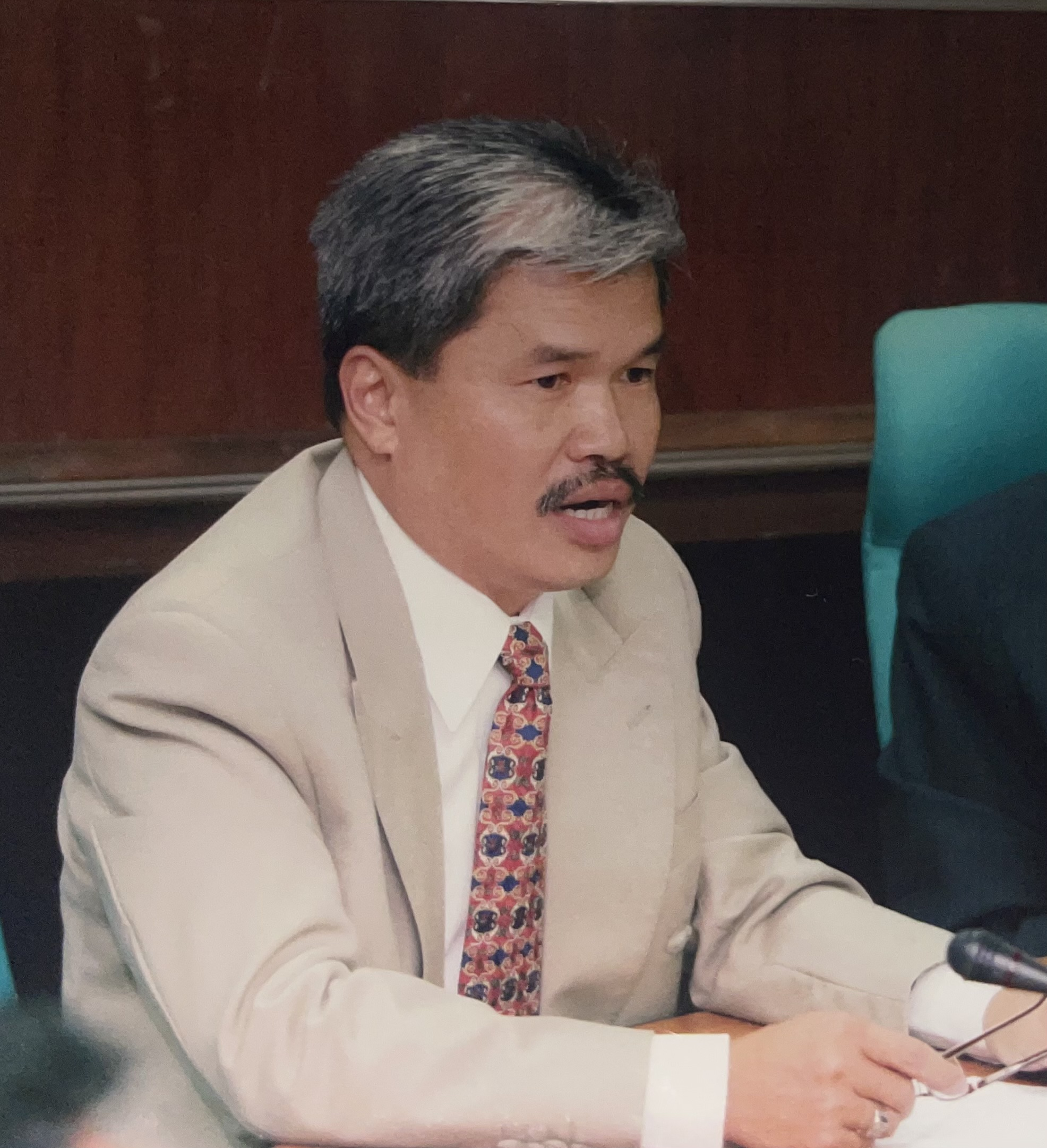
Liew Yun Fah, President of the Sabah People's Hope Party (PHRS).

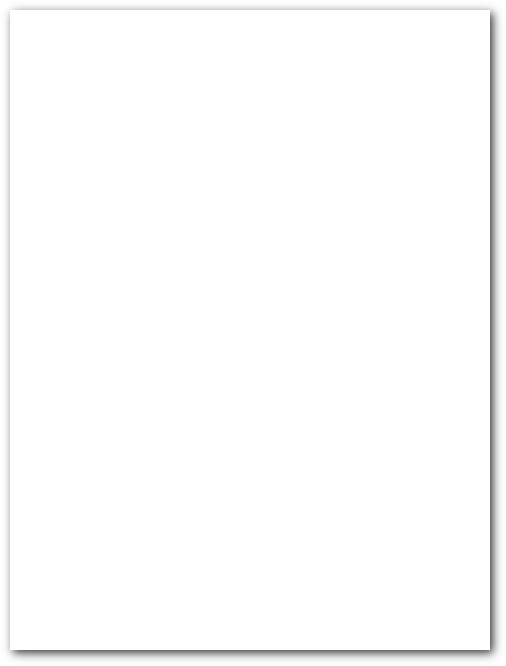
Chin Su Phin, President of the Liberal Democratic Party (LDP).

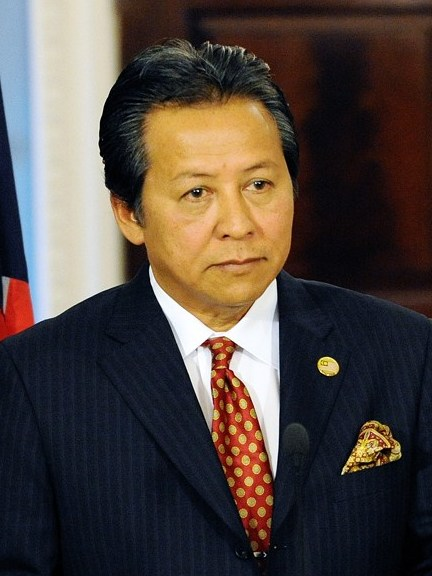
Anifah Aman, President of the Love Sabah Party (PCS).

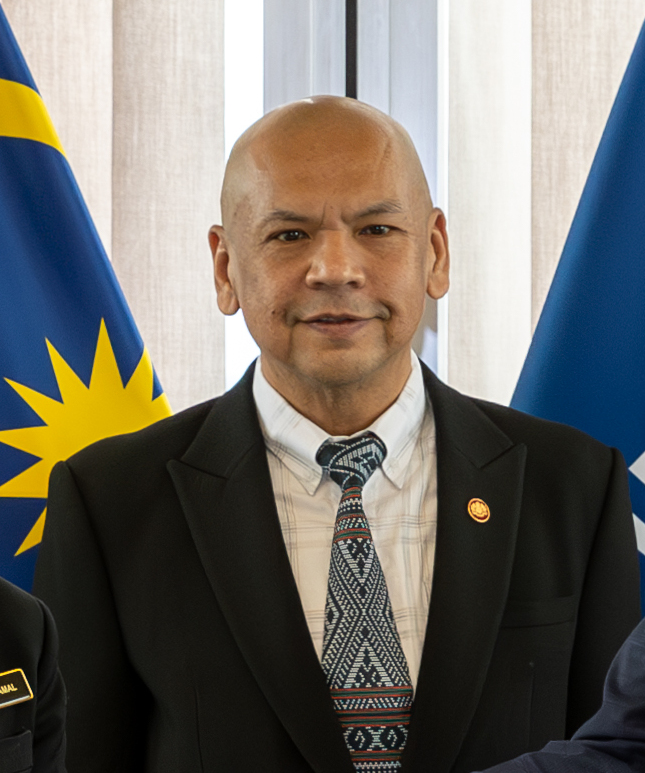
Armizan Mohd Ali, Secretary-General of Gabungan Rakyat Sabah (GRS) and Head of the Organizational Body of the Gabungan Rakyat Sabah direct members faction.

=== Parliament seats (Sabah) ===
Logo	Name		Ideology	Sabah leader(s)	Seats contested	2022 result	
Logo	Name		Ideology	Sabah leader(s)	Seats contested	Votes (%)	Seats
Member parties
	GRS	Sabah People's Coalition (Direct members); Keahlian terus Gabungan Rakyat Sabah	Sabah regionalism	Armizan Mohd Ali	6	0.61%	4 / 222
	GAGASAN	Sabah People's Ideas Party; Parti Gagasan Rakyat Sabah	Sabah regionalism	Hajiji Noor	0	0.00%	0 / 222
	PBS	United Sabah Party; Parti Bersatu Sabah	Sabah regionalism	Joachim Gunsalam	4	0.42%	1 / 222
	UPKO	United Progressive Kinabalu Organisation; Pertubuhan Kinabalu Progresif Bersatu	Sabah regionalism	Ewon Benedick	5	0.47%	2 / 222
	PHRS	Sabah People's Hope Party; Parti Harapan Rakyat Sabah	Sabah regionalism	Liew Yun Fah	0	0%	0 / 222
	LDP	Liberal Democratic Party; Parti Liberal Demokratik	Sabah regionalism	Chin Su Phin	0	0%	0 / 222
	PCS	Love Sabah Party; Parti Cinta Sabah	Sabah regionalism	Anifah Aman	0	0%	0 / 222

=== State seats (Sabah) ===
Logo	Name		Ideology	Sabah leader(s)	Seats contested	2025 result		Current seats
Logo	Name		Ideology	Sabah leader(s)	Seats contested	Votes (%)	Seats	Current seats
Member parties
	GAGASAN	Sabah People's Ideas Party; Parti Gagasan Rakyat Sabah	Sabah regionalism	Hajiji Noor	37	18.11%	22 / 73	25 / 79
	PBS	United Sabah Party; Parti Bersatu Sabah	Sabah regionalism	Joachim Gunsalam	11	4.95%	7 / 73	7 / 79
	UPKO	United Progressive Kinabalu Organisation; Pertubuhan Kinabalu Progresif Bersatu	Sabah regionalism	Ewon Benedick	25	5.71%	3 / 73	3 / 79
	PHRS	Sabah People's Hope Party; Parti Harapan Rakyat Sabah	Sabah regionalism	Liew Yun Fah	1	0.18%	0 / 73	0 / 79
	LDP	Liberal Democratic Party; Parti Liberal Demokratik	Sabah regionalism	Chin Su Phin	0	0.00%	0 / 73	1 / 79
	PCS	Love Sabah Party; Parti Cinta Sabah	Sabah regionalism	Anifah Aman	1	0.41%	0 / 73	0 / 79

=== Allied parties ===
- Social Democratic Harmony Party (KDM) (2022–2026)

=== Former member parties ===
- Malaysian United Indigenous Party of Sabah (Sabah BERSATU) (2020–2022)
- Homeland Solidarity Party (STAR) (2020–2025)
- Sabah Progressive Party (SAPP) (2020–2025)
- United Sabah National Organisation (New) (USNO Baru) (2021–2026)

== List of leaders ==
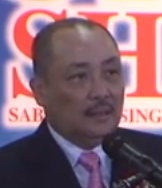
Gabungan Rakyat Sabah (GRS) was founded by Hajiji Noor (pictured) in 2020, and subsequently became the main registration sponsor of GRS in 2022.

Founder	Year
Hajiji Noor	2022 (as registered political coalition)

=== Chairman ===
"(..)" in the number section refers to the same leader appointed after the special meeting of the coalition.

Leader		Took office	Left office
1	Hajiji Noor (inaugural chairman holder)	2020–2021 (Unofficial); 11 March 2022 (Official)	11 December 2022
(1.)	Hajiji Noor	12 December 2022	29 January 2023
(1.)	Hajiji Noor	29 January 2023	Incumbent

== Leadership structure ==
- Chairman:
  - Hajiji Noor (GAGASAN)
- Deputy Chairman:
  - Joachim Gunsalam (PBS)
  - Anifah Aman (PCS)
  - Liew Yun Fah (PHRS)
  - Chin Su Phin (LDP)
  - Masidi Manjun (GAGASAN)
- Secretary-General:
  - Armizan Mohd Ali (Direct Member of GRS)
- Deputy Secretary-General:
  - Mohamed Razali Mohamed Razi (GAGASAN)
- Treasury General:
  - Lo Su Fui (PBS)
- Information Chief:
  - Joniston Bangkuai (PBS)
- Executive Secretary:
  - Abdul Kassim Razali (GAGASAN)
- Youth Chief:
  - Jonnybone J Kurum (PBS)
- Committee Members:
  - Mohd Arifin Mohd Arif (GAGASAN)
  - Ruddy Awah (GAGASAN)
  - Radin Malleh (PBS)
  - Jahid Jahim (PBS)
  - Juil Nuatim (PBS)

== Elected representatives ==
=== Dewan Negara (Senate) ===
==== Senators ====
- His Majesty's appointee:
  - Anna Bell @ Suzieana Perian (GAGASAN)
  - Nelson Wences Angang (UPKO)
- Sabah State Legislative Assembly:
  - Bobbey Ah Fang Suan (GAGASAN)

=== Dewan Rakyat (House of Representatives) ===
==== Members of Parliament of the 15th Malaysian Parliament ====
Gabungan Rakyat Sabah Party has 7 MPs in the House of Representatives.

State	No.	Parliament Constituency	Member	Party
Sabah	P170	Tuaran	Wilfred Madius Tangau	UPKO
Sabah	P174	Penampang	Ewon Benedick	UPKO
Sabah	P175	Papar	Armizan Mohd Ali	GRS
Sabah	P178	Sipitang	Matbali Musah	GRS
Sabah	P179	Ranau	Jonathan Yasin	GRS
Sabah	P185	Batu Sapi	Khairul Firdaus Akbar Khan	GRS
Sabah	P190	Tawau	Lo Su Fui	PBS
Total	Sabah (7)			

=== Dewan Undangan Negeri (State Legislative Assembly) ===
==== Malaysian State Assembly Representatives ====
Sabah State Legislative Assembly

36 / 79

State	No.	Parliamentary Constituency	No.	State Constituency	Member	Party
Sabah	P167	Kudat	N01	Banggi	Mohammad Mohamarin	GAGASAN
Sabah	P167	Kudat	N03	Pitas	Ruddy Awah	GAGASAN
Sabah	P167	Kudat	N04	Tanjong Kapor	Ben Chong Chen Bin	GAGASAN
Sabah	P168	Kota Marudu	N05	Matunggong	Julita Majungki	PBS
Sabah	P168	Kota Marudu	N07	Tandek	Hendrus Anding	PBS
Sabah	P169	Kota Belud	N09	Tempasuk	Mohd Arsad Bistari	GAGASAN
Sabah	P169	Kota Belud	N11	Kadamaian	Ewon Benedick	UPKO
Sabah	P170	Tuaran	N12	Sulaman	Hajiji Noor	GAGASAN
Sabah	P170	Tuaran	N13	Pantai Dalit	Jasnih Daya	GAGASAN
Sabah	P170	Tuaran	N14	Tamparuli	Wilfred Madius Tangau	UPKO
Sabah	P170	Tuaran	N15	Kiulu	Joniston Lumai @ Bangkuai	PBS
Sabah	P173	Putatan	N24	Tanjung Keramat	Shah Alfie Yahya	GAGASAN
Sabah	P174	Penampang	N26	Moyog	Donald Peter Mojuntin	UPKO
Sabah	P175	Papar	N27	Limbahau	Juil Nuatim	PBS
Sabah	P175	Papar	N28	Kawang	Ghulam Haidar Khan Bahadar	GAGASAN
Sabah	P175	Papar	N29	Pantai Manis	Pengiran Saifuddin Pengiran Tahir	GAGASAN
Sabah	P176	Kimanis	N31	Membakut	Mohd Arifin Mohd Arif	GAGASAN
Sabah	P177	Beaufort	N32	Klias	Isnin Aliasnih	GAGASAN
Sabah	P177	Beaufort	N33	Kuala Penyu	Limus Jury	GAGASAN
Sabah	P178	Sipitang	N34	Lumadan	Ruslan Muharam	PBS
Sabah	P179	Ranau	N36	Kundasang	Joachim Gunsalam	PBS
Sabah	P179	Ranau	N37	Karanaan	Masidi Manjun	GAGASAN
Sabah	P181	Tenom	N43	Kemabong	Rubin Balang	GAGASAN
Sabah	P182	Pensiangan	N46	Nabawan	Abdul Ghani Mohamed Yassin	GAGASAN
Sabah	P183	Beluran	N47	Telupid	Jonnybone J Kurum	PBS
Sabah	P183	Beluran	N48	Sugut	James Ratib	GAGASAN
Sabah	P183	Beluran	N49	Labuk	Samad Jambri	GAGASAN
Sabah	P184	Libaran	N51	Sungai Manila	Hazem Mubarak Musa	GAGASAN
Sabah	P187	Kinabatangan	N57	Kuamut	Masiung Banah	GAGASAN
Sabah	P190	Tawau	N67	Balung	Syed Ahmad Syed Abas	GAGASAN
Sabah	P190	Tawau	N68	Apas	Nizam Abu Bakar Titingan	GAGASAN
Sabah	P191	Kalabakan	N71	Tanjung Batu	Andi Muhammad Shamsureezal Mohd Sainal	GAGASAN
-				Nominated Member	Ceasar Mandela Malakun	GAGASAN
-				Nominated Member	Razali Razi	GAGASAN
-				Nominated Member	Abdul Kassim Razali	GAGASAN
-				Nominated Member	Chin Shu Ying	LDP
Total	Sabah (33)					

== Government offices ==
=== Ministerial posts ===
Portfolio	Office Bearer	Party	Constituency
Minister of Domestic Trade and Costs of Living	Datuk Armizan Mohd. Ali MP	Direct	Papar

Portfolio	Office Bearer	Party	Constituency
Deputy Minister of Tourism, Arts and Culture	Datuk Khairul Firdaus Akbar Khan MP	Direct	Batu Sapi
Deputy Minister in the Prime Minister's Department (Federal Territories)	Datuk Lo Su Fui MP	PBS	Tawau

=== State governments ===
- Sabah (2020–present)

Note: bold as Menteri Besar/Chief Minister, italic as junior partner

State	Leader type	Member	Party	State Constituency
Sabah	Chief Minister	Hajiji Noor	GAGASAN	Sulaman

State	Leader type	Member	Party	State Constituency
Sabah	Deputy Chief Minister I	Joachim Gunsalam	PBS	Kundasang
Sabah	Deputy Chief Minister II	Masidi Manjun	GAGASAN	Karanaan
Sabah	Deputy Chief Minister III	Ewon Benedick	UPKO	Kadamaian

== General election results ==
Election	Total seats won	Seats contested	Total votes	Voting Percentage	Outcome of election	Election leader
2022	6 / 222	13	194,324	1.25%	▲4 seats; Governing coalition (Gabungan Rakyat Sabah)	Hajiji Noor

== State election results ==
Sabah State Legislative Assembly
Election	Votes		Seats			Position	Government composition	
Election	Count	%	Result	Won / contested	+/–	Position	Government composition	
2020	316,049	43.2	38 / 73	38 / 92	▲38	1st	Government composition	GRS (2020–2022) (Note: PN (BERSATU–STAR–SAPP–PAS)–BN (UMNO)–PBS)
2020	316,049	43.2	38 / 73	38 / 92	▲38	1st	GRS–BN–PN–KDM–PHRS–PBM (2022–2023) (Note: GRS (Direct–PBS–STAR–SAPP)–BN (UMNO)–PN (PAS)–KDM–PHRS–PBM)	
2020	316,049	43.2	38 / 73	38 / 92	▲38	1st	GRS–PH–PN–KDM (2023–2025) (Note: GRS (GAGASAN–PBS–STAR–SAPP–PHRS)–PH (DAP–PKR–UPKO)–PN (PAS)–KDM)	
2025	286,389	25.4	29 / 73	29 / 55	▼9	1st	GRS–PH–BN–UPKO–STAR–KDM–PN (2025–2026) (Note: GRS (GAGASAN–PBS–LDP)–BN (UMNO–PBRS)–UPKO–PH (PKR)–STAR–KDM–PN (PAS))	
2025	286,389	25.4	29 / 73	29 / 55	▼9	1st	GRS–PH–BN–STAR–PN (2026–present) (Note: GRS (GAGASAN–PBS–UPKO–LDP)–BN (UMNO–PBRS)–PH (PKR)–STAR–PN (PAS))	
