= Sabah Progressive Party =

Sabah Progressive Party Parti Maju Sabah
- Malay name: Parti Maju Sabah
- Abbreviation: SAPP
- President: Yong Teck Lee
- Chairman: Liew Teck Chan; Awang Talip Awang Bagul; Maria Luisa Nobleza; Geoffrey Yee Lung Fuk; Francis Yapp Tai Nyen; Chin Hon Khiong; Eric Majimbun
- Secretary-General: Richard Yong We Kong
- Spokesperson: Chin Vui Kai
- Deputy President: Edward Dagul; Amde Sidik; Chong Pit Fah
- Youth Chief: Jamain Sarudin (Pemuda); Yvonne Yong Yit Phung (Mudanita)
- Women Chief: Noraniza Mohd Noor
- Treasurer General: Japiril Suhaimin Bandaran
- Vice President: Datu Shuaib Datu Mutalib; Aloysius Danim Siap; Gee Tien Siong; Thomas Lau Chee Kiong
- Founder: Yong Teck Lee
- Founded: 21 January 1994
- Split from: United Sabah Party
- Headquarters: House No. 1115, Lorong Kelengkeng 1, Taman Antarabangsa, 3rd Mile, Jalan Tuaran Lama, Likas, 88300 Kota Kinabalu, Sabah
- Youth wing: SAPP Youth Movement
- Women's wing: SAPP Women's Movement
- Ideology: Regionalism
- National affiliation: Homeland Solidarity Party (since 2016) (Note: The party was formerly part of Barisan Nasional (1994–2008), United Borneo Alliance (2012–2015), United Sabah Alliance (2016–2018), United Alliance of Sabah (2018–2020), Perikatan Nasional (2020–2024), Gabungan Rakyat Sabah (2020–2025), and National Unity Government (2022–2025). As part of PN it was aligned with Barisan Nasional (2020–2022) and Gabungan Parti Sarawak (2020–2022).)
- Colours: Yellow, green and blue
- Slogan: Bersama Kita Membangun, Serentak Kita Maju
- Dewan Negara: 0 / 70
- Dewan Rakyat: 0 / 26 (Sabah and Labuan seats)
- Sabah State Legislative Assembly: 0 / 79

Election symbol

Party flag

Website
- www.sapp.org.my

The Sabah Progressive Party (Malay: Parti Maju Sabah, abbreviated SAPP) is a multiracial political party based in Sabah, Malaysia. It was registered on 21 January 1994 by dissidents led by former Sabah Chief Minister Datuk Yong Teck Lee from United Sabah Party. Formerly a component party in the ruling Barisan Nasional coalition, SAPP officially withdrew from BN in September 2008 to become independent. As of 2010, SAPP has two representatives in the national legislature and two in the Sabah State Assembly. In 2016, the party together with Homeland Solidarity Party formed the United Sabah Alliance. It later joined the United Alliance together with STAR and PBS in 2018. The SAPP became the main component party of the national short-lived ruling turned opposition coalition Perikatan Nasional (PN) and Sabah state ruling coalition Gabungan Rakyat Sabah (GRS), the successor of United Alliance that was established in 2020 and registered in 2022. SAPP later withdrew from PN in 2024 after PN decided to contest in the 2025 Sabah state election, of which SAPP strongly disagreed with, based on its principle that the state election should only be contested by local coalitions and parties of Sabah, of which PN is not.

== History ==
=== Formation, joining Barisan Nasional ===
The party was formed on 21 January 1994, by factions of Parti Bersatu Sabah (PBS) led by its vice-president Yong Teck Lee, who disagreed with the party president Joseph Pairin Kitingan. Yong, who was outgoing Deputy Chief Minister under Pairin, together with members of his faction, resigned from PBS on the day of SAPP's formation. The party was registered just in time to enter the 1994 Sabah state election, which SAPP entered under the banner of Barisan Nasional, and won 3 seats out of seven SAPP contested. When BN regained control of the state on March that year after further defections from PBS, SAPP then became part of the government in Sabah. Yong was then appointed as the state's Chief Minister from 1996 to 1998, under then rotation system between Muslim bumiputera, Non-Muslim bumiputera and Chinese leaders for a short two-year tenure.

=== Withdrawal from Barisan Nasional ===
The SAPP won two parliamentary seats in the general election held on 8 March 2008. After the 2008 election, there were calls by many Sabahan political parties for more autonomy from the Malaysian federal government.

SAPP President Yong Teck Lee announced on 18 June 2008 that the party would file a "no-confidence motion" in the Dewan Rakyat on 23 June against Prime Minister Abdullah Ahmad Badawi, calling on him to step down. The party, criticising what it described as insensitivity on the part of the government towards issues in Sabah, said that it was taking advantage of a unique "window of opportunity" for the sake of Sabah interests, including autonomy, return of Labuan and 20% of oil revenues. The majority of the Sabah population are generally content with the SAPP no-confidence vote against Prime Minister Abdullah who has been accused a number of wrongdoings including corruption and abuse of power. In retaliation for calling for a vote of no-confidence against Abdullah, the BN supreme council issued a show-cause letter to SAPP. A 30-day period was to give SAPP a chance to reply and defend itself before BN took any action against them.

On 17 September 2008, SAPP quit Barisan Nasional. Nevertheless, the decision came at a price as the party's deputy president, one of its vice-presidents, and its youth chief (who chose to remain within BN) all opposed the move and withdrew from the party. 2 assemblymen opposing the move then joined GERAKAN. Some 2,000 members of the party similarly disagreed from the move and left the party, showing support for these dissident leaders.

=== Forming the United Sabah Alliance and Gabungan Rakyat Sabah ===
In 2016, the party formed a part of the United Sabah Alliance (USA) and reformed the coalition in 2020 as Gabungan Rakyat Sabah (GRS). SAPP officially became the part of the official member of Gabungan Rakyat Sabah in 2020.

== Representatives ==
=== Dewan Undangan Negeri (State Legislative Assembly) ===
==== Malaysian State Assembly Representatives ====
Sabah State Legislative Assembly

0 / 79

== Government offices ==
=== State governments ===
It has provided one Chief Minister under the Barisan Nasional rotation system that lasted between 1994 and 2004.

- Sabah (1994–1996, 1996–1998, 1998–2008, 2020–2025)

Note: bold as Menteri Besar/Chief Minister, italic as junior partner

=== Legislative leadership ===
State	Leader type	Member	State Constituency
Sabah	Deputy Speaker	Richard Yong We Kong	Non-MLA

== General election results ==
Election	Total seats won	Seats contested	Total votes	Voting Percentage	Outcome of election	Election leader
1995	2 / 193	2			▲2 seats; Government coalition (Barisan Nasional)	Yong Teck Lee
1999	2 / 193	2			0 seats; Government coalition (Barisan Nasional)	Yong Teck Lee
2004	2 / 219	2	16,426	0.24%	0 seats; Government coalition (Barisan Nasional)	Yong Teck Lee
2008	2 / 222	2	30,827	0.39%	0 seats; Government coalition (Barisan Nasional), later Opposition	Yong Teck Lee
2013	0 / 222	8	10,099	0.09%	▼2 seats; No representation in Parliament (UBA)	Yong Teck Lee
2018	0 / 222	5	6,090	0.05%	0 seats; No representation in Parliament (USA)	Yong Teck Lee
2022	0 / 222	1	5,054	0.03%	0 seats; No representation in Parliament (Gabungan Rakyat Sabah)	Yong Teck Lee

== State election results ==
Sabah State Legislative Assembly
Election	Votes		Seats			Position (Note: As part of electoral coalition.)	Status
Election	Count	%	Result	Won / contested	+/–	Position	Status
1994	36,986	8.5	3 / 48	3 / 7	▲3	▲2nd (Barisan Nasional)	Opposition (1994)
1994	36,986	8.5	3 / 48	3 / 7	▲3	▲2nd (Barisan Nasional)	BN (1994–1999)
1999	29,337	5.7	3 / 48	3 / 5	Steady	▲1st (Barisan Nasional)	BN
2004	20,346	4.8	4 / 60	4 / 4	▲1	1st (Barisan Nasional)	BN
2008	27,230	5.2	5 / 60	5 / 5	▲1	1st (Barisan Nasional)	BN (2008)
2008	27,230	5.2	5 / 60	5 / 5	▲1	1st (Barisan Nasional)	Opposition (2008–2013)
2013	31,324	4.1	0 / 60	0 / 41	▼5	▼4th	No seats
2018	5,031	0.6	0 / 60	0 / 5	Steady	4th (United Sabah Alliance)	No seats
2020	3,146	0.4	0 / 73	0 / 2	Steady	▲1st (Gabungan Rakyat Sabah)	GRS (2020–2023) (Note: Appointed state assemblyman)
2020	3,146	0.4	0 / 73	0 / 2	Steady	▲1st (Gabungan Rakyat Sabah)	GRS–PH (2023–2025)
2025	7,733	0.7	0 / 73	0 / 6	Steady	▼10th	No seats

== See also ==
- Politics of Malaysia
- List of political parties in Malaysia
