= Lo Su Fui =

Malaysian politician (born 1981)

Yang Berhormat Datuk Lo Su Fui PGDK JP MP
- 罗思辉
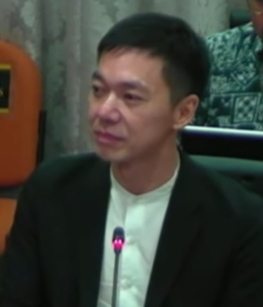

Deputy Minister in the Prime Minister's Department (Federal Territories)
- Incumbent
- Assumed office 17 December 2025
- Monarch: Ibrahim
- Prime Minister: Anwar Ibrahim
- Minister: Hannah Yeoh Tseow Suan
- Preceded by: Jalaluddin Alias (as Deputy Minister of Federal Territories)
- Constituency: Tawau

Special Officer for Chinese Affairs of the Chief Minister of Sabah
- In office 29 January 2021 – 27 October 2022
- Governor: Juhar Mahiruddin
- Chief Minister: Hajiji Noor
- Succeeded by: Yee Tsai Yiew

Member of the Malaysian Parliament for Tawau
- Incumbent
- Assumed office 19 November 2022
- Preceded by: Christina Liew Chin Jin (PH–PKR)
- Majority: 3,800 (2022)

Deputy President of the United Sabah Party (Chinese Quota)
- Incumbent
- Assumed office 27 September 2026 Serving with: Joniston Bangkuai (Non-Muslim Bumiputera) &; Ruslan Muharam (Muslim Bumiputera)
- President: Joachim Gunsalam
- Preceded by: Yee Moh Chai

Personal details
- Born: Lo Su Fui; 14 April 1981 (age 45) Tawau, Sabah, Malaysia
- Citizenship: Malaysia
- Party: United Sabah Party (PBS)
- Other political affiliations: Gabungan Rakyat Sabah (GRS)
- Education: University of Sheffield (LLB)
- Occupation: Politician
- Lo Su Fui on Facebook

Lo Su Fui

Chinese name
- Traditional Chinese: 羅思輝
- Simplified Chinese: 罗思辉
Transcriptions
Standard Mandarin
- Hanyu Pinyin: Luō Sīhuī

Lo Su Fui (simplified Chinese: 罗思辉; traditional Chinese: 羅思輝; pinyin: Luō Sīhuī; born 14 April 1981) is a Malaysian politician who has served as the Deputy Minister in the Prime Minister's Department in charge of Federal Territories in the Unity Government adminustration under Prime Minister Anwar Ibrahim and Minister Hannah Yeoh Tseow Suan since December 2025 and Member of Parliament (MP) for Tawau since November 2022. He was the Special Officer for Chinese Affairs of the Chief Minister of Sabah from January 2021 to his resignation in October 2022. He is a member of the United Sabah Party (PBS), a component party of the GRS coalition. He is currently serving as the Deputy President of PBS for the Chinese quota since September 2026. He is also presently the sole PBS MP and the sole PBS candidate elected in the 2022 general election. He was also Executive Advisor and President and of the Tawau Chinese Chamber of Commerce (TCCC) from 2012 to 2018, Deputy President and Secretary-General of the Associated Chinese Chambers of Commerce and Industry of Malaysia (ACCCIM) of Sabah. In addition, he is Member of the Board of Governors of the Sabah Chinese High School and Advisor of the Institute of Science and Management in Tawau.

== Election results ==
Parliament of Malaysia
Year	Constituency	Candidate	Votes	Pct	Opponent(s)	Votes	Pct	Ballots cast	Majority	Turnout
2022	P190 Tawau	Lo Su Fui (PBS)	19,865	39.19%	Christina Liew Chin Jin (PKR)	16,065	31.69%	50,687	3,800	57.94%
2022	P190 Tawau	Lo Su Fui (PBS)	19,865	39.19%	Chen Ket Chuin (WARISAN)	11,263	22.22%	50,687	3,800	57.94%
2022	P190 Tawau	Lo Su Fui (PBS)	19,865	39.19%	Mohd Salleh Bacho (IND)	1,776	3.50%	50,687	3,800	57.94%
2022	P190 Tawau	Lo Su Fui (PBS)	19,865	39.19%	Herman Amdas (PEJUANG)	1,067	2.11%	50,687	3,800	57.94%
2022	P190 Tawau	Lo Su Fui (PBS)	19,865	39.19%	Chin Chee Syn (IND)	651	1.28%	50,687	3,800	57.94%

Sabah State Legislative Assembly
Year	Constituency	Candidate	Votes	Pct	Opponent(s)	Votes	Pct	Ballots cast	Majority	Turnout
2018	N57 Sri Tanjong	Lo Su Fui (PBS)	4,290	22.17%	Jimmy Wong Sze Phin (DAP)	13,673	70.65%	18,990	9,383	73.30%
2018	N57 Sri Tanjong	Lo Su Fui (PBS)	4,290	22.17%	Pang Thou Chung (PHRS)	873	4.51%	18,990	9,383	73.30%
2018	N57 Sri Tanjong	Lo Su Fui (PBS)	4,290	22.17%	Leong Yun Fui (PKS)	154	0.80%	18,990	9,383	73.30%

== Honours ==
=== Honours of Malaysia ===
- Malaysia
  - Recipient of the 17th Yang di-Pertuan Agong Installation Medal (2025)
- Sabah
  - Commander of the Order of Kinabalu (PGDK) – Datuk (2023)
  - Justice of the Peace (JP) (2021)
