= Parti Aspirasi Rakyat Sarawak =

Political party of Sarawak, Malaysia

Parti Aspirasi Rakyat Sarawak Sarawak People's Aspiration Party
- Abbreviation: ASPIRASI
- President: Buln Patrick Ribos
- Chairman: Hugh Lawrence Zehnder
- Founder: Dr. Patau Rubis
- Founded: 8 October 1996 (Sarawak); 6 January 2012 (Sabah); 24 January 2020 (renamed as ASPIRASI)
- Legalised: 26 January 2020 (Legalised as ASPIRASI)
- Split from: SNAP (Sarawak, 1996) PKR (Sabah, 2012)
- Preceded by: State Reform Party (STAR)
- Succeeded by: Homeland Solidarity Party (STAR) (in Sabah since 2016 and minor branch in Kuala Lumpur under Jeffrey Kitingan faction in 2020)
- Headquarters: Kuching, Sarawak; Bau, Sarawak; Serian, Sarawak
- Ideology: • Regionalism • Multiracialism • MA63 rights • Self-determination • Anti-Peninsula based parties
- Political position: Centre-left
- National affiliation: United Borneo Alliance (2012–2015); Gabungan Anak Sarawak (GAGAS) (2018–2023); Gagasan Sarawak Progresif (since 2026)
- Slogan: United for Future Sarawak (Bersatu untuk Masa Depan Sarawak)
- Dewan Negara: 0 / 70
- Dewan Rakyat: 0 / 31 (Sarawak seats)
- Sarawak State Legislative Assembly: 0 / 82
- Premier of Sarawak: 0 / 1

Website
- Parti Aspirasi Rakyat Sarawak on Facebook; Parti Aspirasi Rakyat Sarawak on Facebook

The Sarawak People's Aspiration Party (Malay: "Parti Aspirasi Rakyat Sarawak", abbreviated ASPIRASI) is a centre-left political party based in Sarawak, Malaysia, renamed and rebranded from their former organisation faction, State Reform Party abbreviated as STAR.

== Background and party establishment history ==
Logos and Flags of Party

State Reform Party original logo (1996–2020)

The party began as the State Reform Party (STAR) in the 1996 founded by Patau Rubis after he was expelled from Sarawak National Party for endorsing an independent candidate in 1996 general election. It used a 9-pointed star derived from the state flag as its logo. The party contested in the 2016 state elections under the STAR logo, failing to win a single seat.

The State Reform Party's policy will ensure the party always struggle as a significant pressure group on demanding recognition of Sarawak rights together with many other non-governmental organisations (NGOs). The Party demands that the Government of Sarawak have to reform the state government system and go out from the available comfort zone. As a pro-Sarawakian independence party, it aims to table Sarawak Independence Referendum Ordinance in event it won seat in the Sarawak State Legislative Assembly.

== The party leadership history ==
Patau Rubis is the first ASPIRASI president, on that time also known as STAR Party or State Reform Party (before rebranded). He died in 2016, after collapsed while presiding the STAR Sarawak's Annual General Meeting (AGM) on 20 March and was replaced by Lina Soo. Beside the President Lina Soo, the party AGM later had also elected a new committee including Bulin anak Ribos as chairman on 12 October 2017. After the leadership changed to Lina Soo faction, they agreed to rebranding STAR as ASPIRASI including the logo to avoid people confusion with the STAR Sabah organisation on July 28, 2020.

== The party expansion and separation history ==
In 2012, STAR also expanded to neighbouring Sabah with setting of the state chapter led by Jeffrey Kitingan, who had also initiated the United Borneo Alliance (UBA), in its effort to switch to a Borneo-based regional party uniting all local parties in Sabah and Sarawak to promote jointly the 7 Borneo Agendas.

In 2016 Kitingan re-registered the Sabah chapter as a new Sabah-based party, Parti Solidariti Tanah Airku (STAR) but retained the backronym STAR, leaving the original State Reform Party back as Sarawak-based. In 2016 STAR Sabah rebranded itself as the Homeland Solidarity Party (with acronym STAR) and STAR Sarawak rebranded itself as the Sarawak People's Aspiration Party (with acronym ASPIRASI).

== Rebranding as ASPIRASI ==
The party rebranded as Parti Aspirasi Rakyat Sarawak or ASPIRASI in February 2020 and unveiled a new logo based on Rajah Brooke's birdwing butterfly in December 2021, a week before the 2021 Sarawak state election.

Basis of ASPIRASI symbol

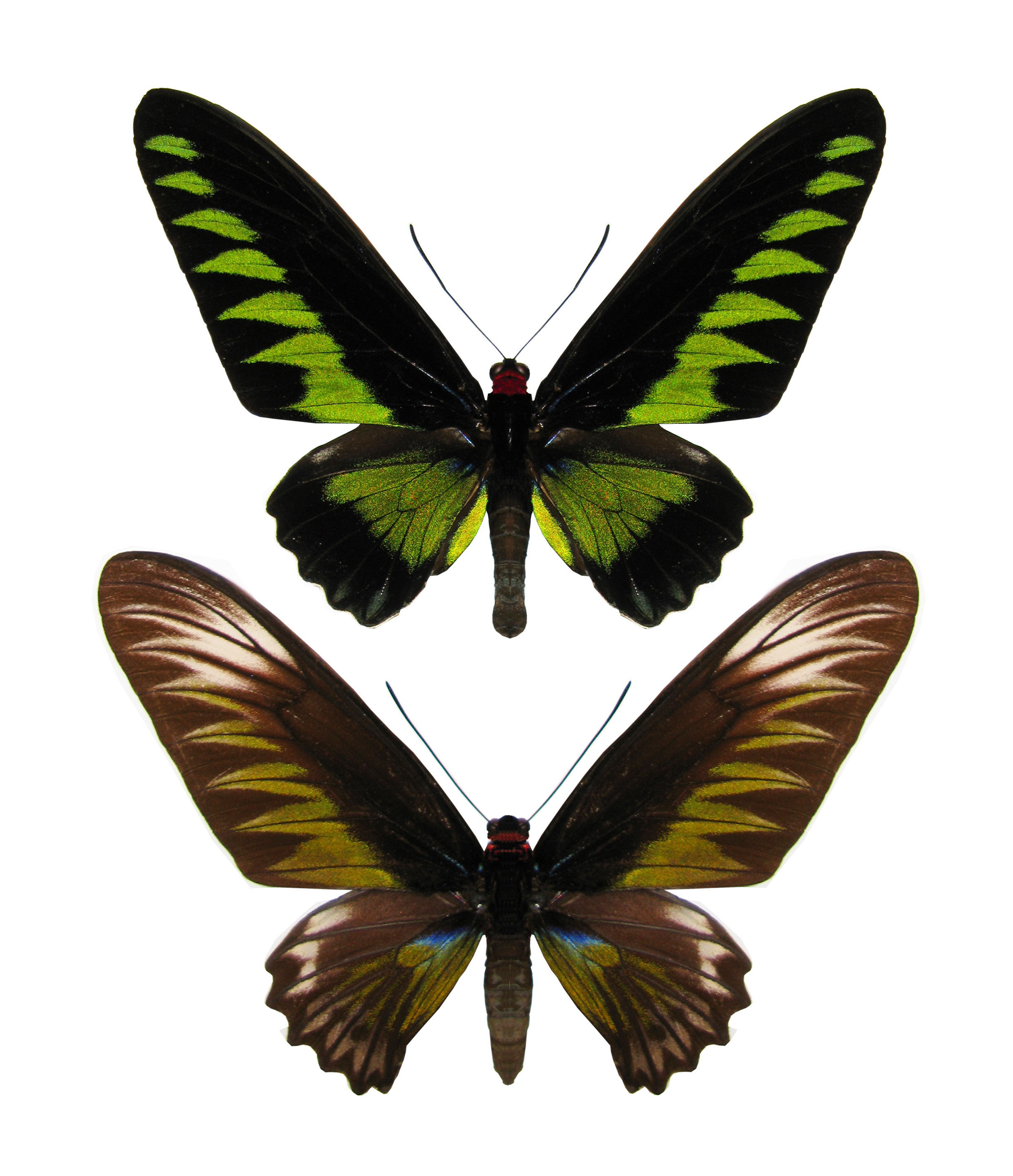
The Rajah Brooke Birdwing

== List of presidents ==
- Dr. Patau Rubis (1996 – 2011)
- Dr. Dripin Sakoi (2011 – 2016)
- Lina Soo (2016 – 2025)
- Hugh Lawrence Zehnder (2025 – 2026) (acting president)
- Buln Patrick Ribos (2026 – now)

== Candidates in the Sarawak state elections ==
- State Reform Party candidates, 2016 Sarawak state election

== General election results ==
| Election | Total seats won | Seats contested | Total votes | Voting Percentage | Outcome of election | Election leader |
|---|---|---|---|---|---|---|
| 1999 (STAR) | 0 / 193 | 23 | 23,354 | 0.35% | ; No representation in Parliament | Patau Rubis |
| 2004 (STAR) | 0 / 219 | 23 | 6,270 | 0.09% | ; No representation in Parliament | Patau Rubis |
| 2013 (STAR) | 0 / 222 | 22 | 45,386 | 0.41% | ; No representation in Parliament | Patau Rubis |
| 2018 (STAR Sarawak) | 0 / 222 | 19 | 1,299 | 0.01% | ; No representation in Parliament | Lina Soo |

== State election results ==
| State election | Count | | State Legislative Assembly | | | | Position (Note: As part of electoral coalition.) | Status |
| State election | Votes | % | Sarawak | Sabah | Won / Contested | +/– | Position | Status |
|---|---|---|---|---|---|---|---|---|
| 1999 | Did not contest | | | | | | | No seats |
| 2001 | 12,211 | 2.3 | 0 / 62 | | 0 / 5 | Steady | 4th | No seats |
| 2004 | Did not contest | | | | | | | No seats |
| 2006 | Did not contest | | | | | | | No seats |
| 2008 | Did not contest | | | | | | | No seats |
| 2011 | Did not contest | | | | | | | No seats |
| 2013 | 43,793 | 5.7 | | 1 / 1 | 1 / 49 | ▲1 | 3rd | Opposition |
| 2016 | 2,841 | 0.4 | 0 / 82 | | 0 / 11 | Steady | ▲4th | No seats |
| 2018 | 109 | 0.0 | | 0 / 60 | 0 / 2 | ▼1 | ▼10th | No seats |
| 2020 | Did not contest | | | | | | | No seats |
| 2021 | 2,525 | 0.3 | 0 / 82 | | 0 / 15 | Steady | ▼5th (Gabungan Anak Sarawak) | No seats |
| 2025 | 141 | 0.0 | | 0 / 73 | 0 / 3 | Steady | ▲20th | No seats |
