= Love Sabah Party =

Political party of Malaysia

- Malay name: Parti Cinta Sabah
- Abbreviation: PCS
- President: Anifah Aman
- Deputy President: Vacant
- Founder: Nicholas James Guntobun
- Founded: 2013
- Legalised: 28 August 2013
- Split from: UMNO Sabah (Anifah's quitting decision in 2019)
- Headquarters: Lot 29, 1st Floor, Block E, Nountun Industry Estate, 88450 Kota Kinabalu, Sabah
- Ideology: Regionalism
- National affiliation: Gabungan Rakyat Sabah (since 2024) (Note: The party was part of the United Sabah Alliance (2016–2017) and was aligned with Anak Negeri (2018) and Pakatan Harapan (2022)); National Unity Government (since 2022)
- Colours: Blue, white, red
- Slogan: For The Autonomy and Freedom of Sabah (Demi Autonomi dan Kedaulatan Sabah)
- Dewan Negara: 0 / 70
- Dewan Rakyat: 0 / 26 (Sabah and Labuan seats)
- Sabah State Legislative Assembly: 0 / 79

Election symbol
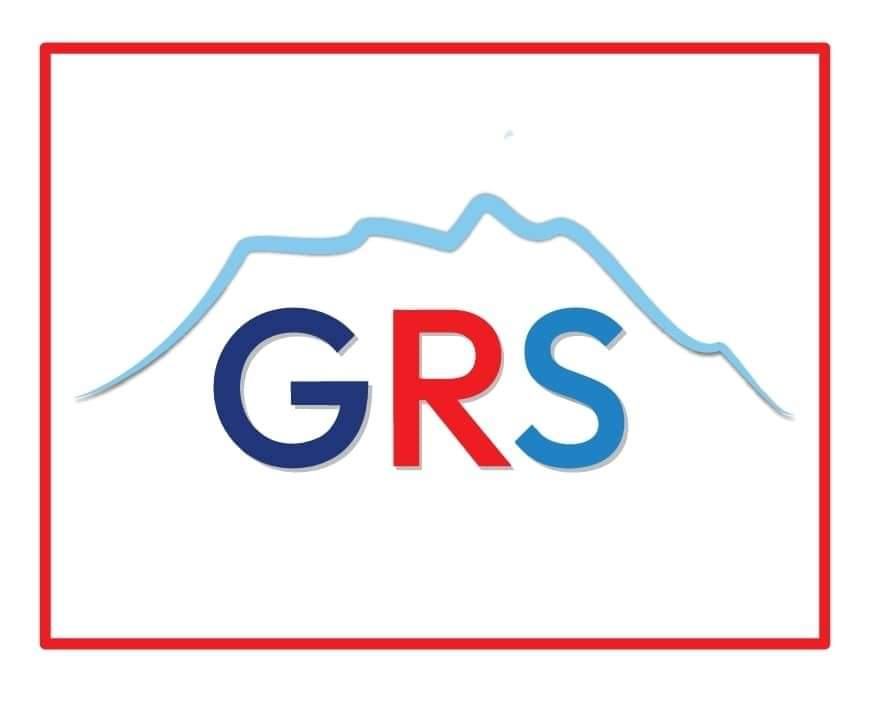

Party flag

Website
- Love Sabah Party on Facebook

The Love Sabah Party (Malay: Parti Cinta Sabah; abbrev: PCS) is a political party of Sabah, Malaysia. The PCS is a relatively Sabahan grand local party and was among 20 Malaysian local party registrations approved by the Registrar of Society in 2013 along with Ationg Tituh's Sabah People's Ideas Party (GAGASAN RAKYAT).

PCS joined together with the Sabah Progressive Party (SAPP) and State Reform Party (STAR) in the United Sabah Alliance (USA), but later left the coalition over disagreements. The party then signed political pact with the Sabah Native Co-operation Party in March 2018 with the ultimate goal to restore the rights, dignity and identity of the ‘Anak Negeri’ (native) or the firstborn in the state of Sabah.

Anifah Aman took over as President from his outgoing predecessor Wilfred Bumburing who was elected as the new Deputy President after winning the position uncontested during the party 2nd Biennal General Meeting on 26 July 2020. The party BGM also passed a resolution for the party to be renamed as Sabah People's Awareness Party (Parti Kesedaran Rakyat Sabah), with a new flag and symbol upon RoS approval. In 2022, the rebranding process of this party has been cancelled due to many of the party member that doesn't agree with the new name. In 2024, the party has been accepted into Gabungan Rakyat Sabah (GRS) political coalition, who governs Sabah at the time.

== General election results ==
Election	Total seats won	Seats contested	Total votes	Voting Percentage	Outcome of election	Election leader
2018	0 / 222	8	8,603	0.07%	0 seat; No representation in Parliament	Wilfred Bumburing

== State election results ==
Sabah State Legislative Assembly
Election	Votes		Seats			Position (Note: As part of electoral coalition.)	Status
Election	Count	%	Result	Won / contested	+/–	Position	Status
2018	9,311	1.1	0 / 60	0 / 18	Steady	6th	No seats
2020	29,118	4.0	0 / 73	0 / 73	Steady	▼3rd	No seats
2025	4,604	0.4	0 / 73	0 / 1	Steady	▲1st (Gabungan Rakyat Sabah)	No seats

== See also ==
- Politics of Malaysia
- List of political parties in Malaysia
