= United Sabah Party =

United Sabah Party Parti Bersatu Sabah
- Malay name: Parti Bersatu Sabah
- Abbreviation: PBS
- President: Joachim Gunsalam
- Chairperson: Claudius Alex Sundang
- Secretary-General: Julita Mojungki
- Spokesperson: Bonaventure Boniface
- Deputy Presidents: Joniston Bangkuai (Non-Muslim Bumiputera); Ruslan Muharam (Muslim Bumiputera); Lo Su Fui (Chinese)
- Vice Presidents: Hendrus Anding; Jonnybone J Kurum; Sahrol Mahoolop; Mursid Mohd Rais; Arthur Sen Siong Choo
- Women's Chief: Muteh @ Evelyn Sigar
- Youth Chief: Christopher Mandut
- Treasurer-General: Lu Kim Yen
- Founder: Joseph Pairin Kitingan
- Founded: 5 March 1985; 41 years ago
- Split from: Sabah People's United Front (BERJAYA)
- Preceded by: United Sabah Movement
- Headquarters: Blok ‘M’, Lot 4, Tingkat 2 & 3, Donggongon New Township, Donggongon, 89507 Penampang (Peti Surat 13060, 88834 Kota Kinabalu, Sabah)
- Youth wing: Youth Section
- Women's wing: Women Section
- Membership (2022): 580,000▲
- Ideology: Sabah regionalism; 20-point agreement; Multiracialism; Indigenous rights; Social conservatism; Kadazan-Dusun interests
- Political position: Centre-right
- National affiliation: Gabungan Rakyat Sabah (since 2020) (Note: The party was formerly part of Gagasan Rakyat (1991–1996), Barisan Nasional (1985–1990, 2002–2018), and United Alliance of Sabah (2018–2020) and was allied with Perikatan Nasional (2020–2022)); National Unity Government (since 2022)
- Colours: Light blue and green
- Slogan: "Bersatu!, Bersatu!, Bersatu!"; "Sabah untuk Rakyat Sabah"
- Anthem: Bersatu Dalam PBS
- Dewan Negara: 0 / 70
- Dewan Rakyat: 1 / 26 (Sabah and Labuan seats)
- Sabah State Legislative Assembly: 6 / 79
- Chief ministers in Malaysia: 0 / 13

Election symbol
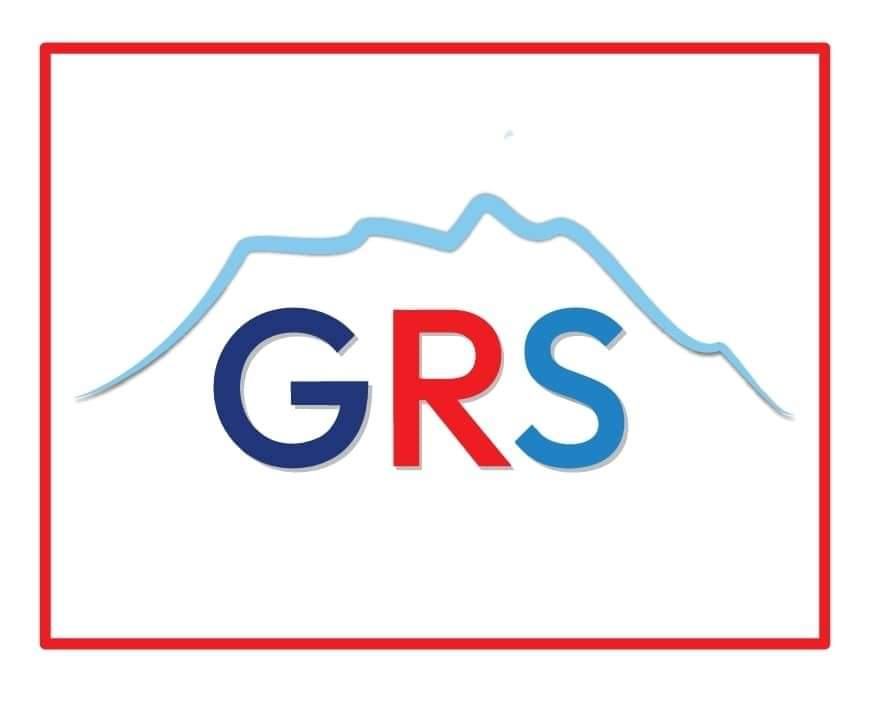

Party flag

Website
- www.pbsonline.org

The United Sabah Party (Malay: Parti Bersatu Sabah; abbrev.: PBS) is a political party in the Malaysian state of Sabah. The PBS was founded by Joseph Pairin Kitingan in 1985 under the name of the United Sabah Movement (Malay: Gerakan Sabah Bersatu), it is Sabah's oldest currently active local party. PBS is also one of six major component parties that formed the Gabungan Rakyat Sabah (GRS), a Sabah-based official political coalition since 2022.

Since 2022, the PBS in its capacity as a major member of the Sabah-based GRS state governing political alliance acts as an allied partner, providing confidence and supply to the ruling Pakatan Harapan (PH) coalition on the federal level.

== History ==
PBS official logo since 1985 (logo above is being remastered in 2020)

PBS was registered as a political party on 5 March 1985. Its founding president, Joseph Pairin Kitingan had broken away from the ruling Parti Bersatu Rakyat Jelata Sabah (BERJAYA) because of his differences with the Chief Minister of Sabah and party president, Harris Salleh, whose state cabinet Pairin had served in. BERJAYA itself had ousted the previous state government of United Sabah National Organisation (USNO) to govern Sabah for 8 years from 1976 to 1985.

PBS later formed the state government after winning the 1985 state election. Following the 1986 Sabah riots, which occurred after PBS's victory in the 1986 state election, PBS joined the Barisan Nasional (BN) coalition and governed Sabah from 1985 to 1994. However, on the eve of the 1990 state election, PBS pulled out of BN to join the Gagasan Rakyat (GR) coalition and won the state election for a third time. It also won the 1994 state election by a narrow margin. The subsequent administration was short-lived as defectors switched their allegiance to BN, resulting in Pairin's resignation. PBS subsequently rejoined the BN coalition in 2002.

Following the fall of both federal and state BN governments in the 2018 general election (GE14), PBS left the coalition and formed a new Sabah-based informal coalition of parties known as the United Alliance or "Gabungan Bersatu". During the 2020–2022 Malaysian political crisis, PBS provided confidence and supply to Perikatan Nasional (PN) and Prime Minister Muhyiddin Yassin, and later, Ismail Sabri Yaakob. The party joined the Gabungan Rakyat Sabah (GRS) or "Sabah People's Alliance" just before the 2020 Sabah state election which was won eventually by GRS.

== Ideology and support base ==
Although it is mainly seen as an ethnically-based Kadazan-Dusun political party, PBS calls itself a "Malaysian multi-racial political party". Members are mostly of Kadazan-Dusun (from both the Dusunic plus Paitanic ethnolinguistic groups) and Murut (including the Lundayeh subgroup) ethnic descent, though the second and third largest ethnic membership are mostly Muslim Bumiputeras, mostly ethnic local Sabahan based ethnic Malays (Bruneian Malays and Cocos Malays), and also from the Bajau community (the second-largest ethnic Bumiputera in the state including the Iranun subgroup and some Suluk together with the Chinese, alongside those of mixed-race or Sino-Native subgroup of the Chinese minority). Its declared political mission is to strive to safeguard Sabah's autonomy and state rights, promoting democratic principles, economic advancement, human rights and a fair justice system. It also seeks preserving the traditional culture of each race in Sabah and freedom of religion in Malaysia.

Among the most vocal issues voiced by the party were the issue of illegal immigrants along with 'ghost voters' in Sabah, the Project IC issue in East Malaysia, unbalanced development and the 20 points of the Malaysian Agreement 1963 for Sabah's entry into Malaysia.

Since 1994 major defections from PBS, several political parties with similar ideologies have emerged. The closest is the STAR Party, founded by Jeffrey G. Kitingan, the younger brother of the founding president of PBS, Joseph Pairin Kitingan. Other similar parties include Parti Bersatu Rakyat Sabah.

== List of leaders ==
List of PBS Presidents

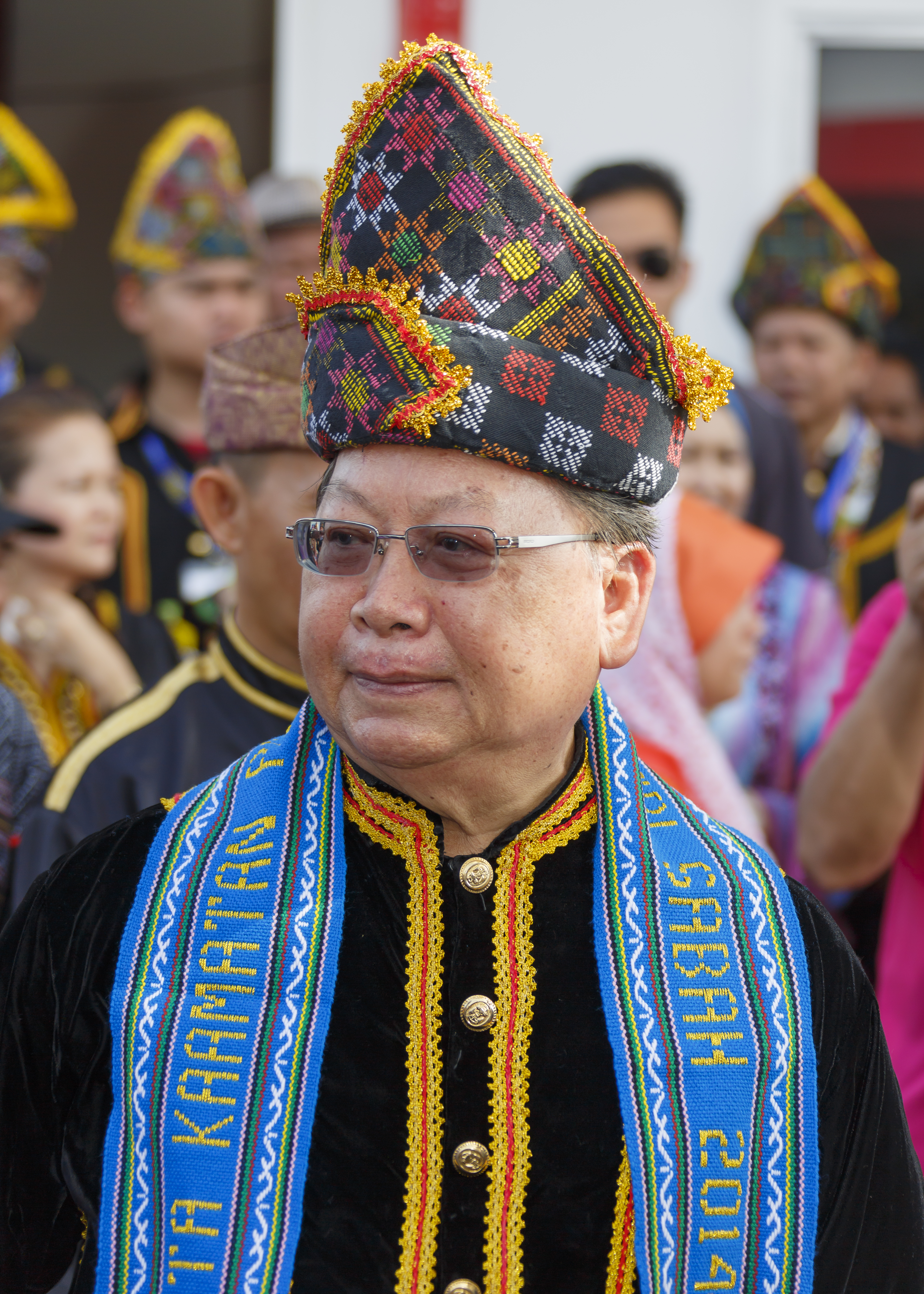
1st: Joseph Pairin Kitingan, founding President (1985–2017)

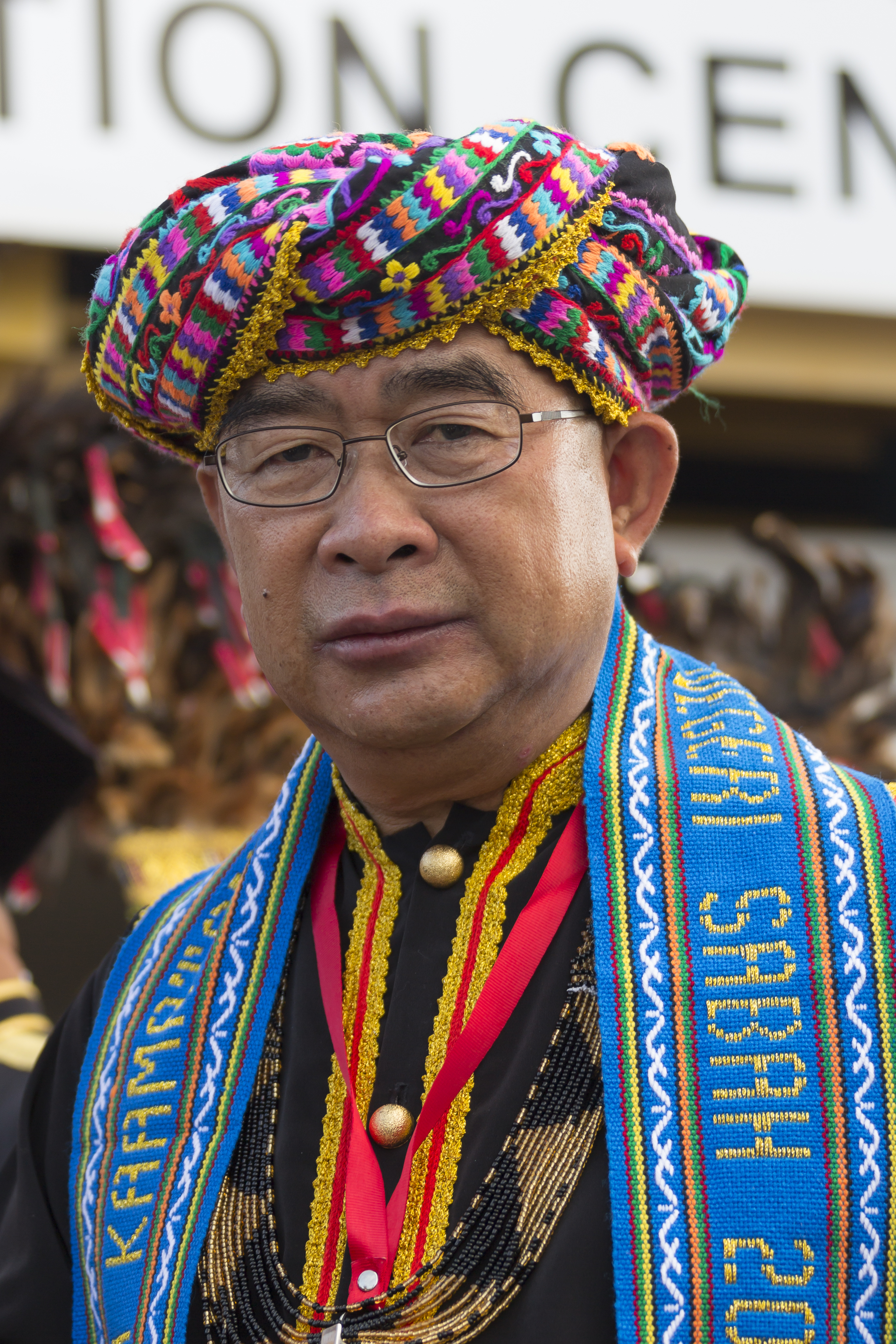
2nd: Maximus Ongkili, the second President (2017–2026)

== Leadership structure (2026–2029) ==
Executive Council

- President:
  - Joachim Gunsalam
- Deputy Presidents:
  - Joniston Bangkuai (Non-Muslim Bumiputera)
  - Ruslan Muharam (Muslim Bumiputera)
  - Lo Su Fui (Chinese)
- Vice Presidents:
  - Hendrus Anding (Non-Muslim Bumiputera)
  - Jonnybone J Kurum (Non-Muslim Bumiputera)
  - Sahrol Mahoolop (Muslim Bumiputera)
  - Mursid Mohd Said (Muslim Bumiputera)
  - Arthur Sen Siong Choo (Chinese)
- Women's Chief:
  - Muteh @ Evelyn Sigar
- Youth Chief:
  - Christopher Mandut
- Secretary-General:
  - Julita Mojungki
- Treasurer-General:
  - Lu Kim Yen
- Information Chief:
  - Bonaventure Boniface
- Supreme Council Members (Non-Muslim Bumiputera):
  - Junid Gunsalam
  - John Chryso Masabal
  - Samuil Mopun
  - Suman Yasambun
  - Stanis Buandi
  - Masum Takin
  - Julius Atung
- Supreme Council Members (Muslim Bumiputera):
  - Fazidah Mohd Yassin
  - Aliamis Sami
  - Juin Saman
  - Aliyu Zinin
  - Fazil @ John Anthony
- Supreme Council Members (Chinese):
  - Yee Tsai Yiew
  - Tong Yong Wai
  - Sheiron Chang
  - Lim Vun Chan

Women's Executive Council

- Women's Chief:
  - Muteh @ Evelyn Sigar
- Deputy Chiefs:
  - Julita Dalinsi (Non-Muslim Bumiputera)
  - Mariana Majinau (Muslim Bumiputera)
  - Lai Nyat Yin @ Vicky Yee (Chinese)
- Vice Chiefs:
  - Sariah Duling (Non-Muslim Bumiputera)
  - Raihanah Rosnie Deding Abdullah (Muslim Bumiputera)
  - Mimi Leong @ Florance (Chinese)
- Council Members (Non-Muslim Bumiputera):
  - Lainah @ Nyonya Tukun
  - Janet P Baidin
  - Macklyn Dickson Gabu
  - Elsianna Samuel
  - Davina Bodingin
- Council Members (Muslim Bumiputera):
  - Ireni Joannes @ Nurin
  - Judith Ann Tai (Nurmaliza)
  - Natasha Debra H Durai
  - Salina Titi
- Council Members (Chinese):
  - Joseph Vung
  - Imelda Annabell Shen
  - Chu Nget Yun
  - Jennifer Lee Fung Sen

Youth Executive Council

- Youth Chief:
  - Christopher Mandut
- Deputy Chiefs:
  - Stanly Leo (Non-Muslim Bumiputera)
  - Khairol Majide Kalimin (Muslim Bumiputera)
  - Louis Lai Vui Leong (Chinese)
- Vice Chiefs:
  - Kevin Jon Johnny (Non-Muslim Bumiputera)
  - Ariffin Juin (Muslim Bumiputera)
  - Adrian Chong (Chinese)
- Secretary:
  - Shahrun Nidzam
- Treasurer:
  - Alan Lim Ket Lun
- Information Officer:
  - Steve Johnny Mositun
- Assistant Secretary:
  - Alexyus Matius
- Assistant Information Officer:
  - Joanes Robert (Ateng)
- Council Members (Non-Muslim Bumiputera):
  - Walter Benson
  - Herman Milah
  - Aloysius Yujilin
  - Zainal Ebin
  - Kennedy Ongkili
- Council Members (Muslim Bumiputera):
  - Amiul Taadzul
  - Nordiman Nausid
  - Nuriman Aaron
  - Masri Batong
- Council Members (Chinese):
  - Tan Min Zhu
  - Kwan Lik Chan
  - Wong Khi Yang
  - Foo Chin Man

== Elected representatives ==
=== Dewan Rakyat (House of Representatives) ===
==== Members of Parliament of the 15th Malaysian Parliament ====
PBS has currently only 1 MP in the House of Representatives.

State	No.	Parliament Constituency	Member	Party
Sabah	P190	Tawau	Lo Su Fui	PBS
Total	Sabah (1)			

=== Dewan Undangan Negeri (State Legislative Assembly) ===
==== Malaysian State Assembly Representatives ====
Sabah State Legislative Assembly

6 / 79

State	No.	Parliamentary Constituency	No.	State Assembly Constituency	Member	Party
Sabah	P168	Kota Marudu	N05	Matunggong	Julita Mojungki	PBS
Sabah	P168	Kota Marudu	N07	Tandek	Hendrus Anding	PBS
Sabah	P170	Tuaran	N15	Kiulu	Joniston Bangkuai	PBS
Sabah	P178	Sipitang	N34	Lumadan	Ruslan Muharam	PBS
Sabah	P179	Ranau	N36	Kundasang	Joachim Gunsalam	PBS
Sabah	P183	Beluran	N47	Telupid	Jonnybone J Kurum	PBS
Sabah	Total	Sabah (6)				

== Government offices ==
=== Ministerial posts ===
Portfolio	Office Bearer	Constituency
Deputy Minister in the Prime Minister's Department (Federal Territories)	Lo Su Fui	Tawau

=== State governments ===
PBS currently serves as junior partner in GRS government

- Sabah (1985–1994, 2004–2018, 2020–present)

Note: bold as Menteri Besar/Chief Minister, italic as junior partner

State	Leader type	Member	State Constituency
Sabah	Deputy Chief Minister I	Joachim Gunsalam	Kundasang

== Election results ==
Election year	Malaysia Parliament		Outcome
Election year	Candidates	Seats won	Outcome
1986	14	10 / 177	▲10 seats; Federal governing coalition (Barisan Nasional)
1990	14	14 / 180	▲4 seats; Federal opposition coalition (left BN before polling day to join Gagasan Rakyat)
1995	28	8 / 192	▼6 seats; Federal opposition
1999	17	3 / 193	▼5 seats; Federal opposition
2004	4	4 / 219	▲1 seat; Federal governing coalition (Barisan Nasional)
2008	4	3 / 222	▼1 seat; Federal governing coalition (Barisan Nasional)
2013	5	4 / 222	▲1 seat; Federal governing coalition (Barisan Nasional)
2018	5	1 / 222	▼3 seat; Federal opposition coalition (United Alliance)
2022	4	1 / 222	; Federal governing coalition (Gabungan Rakyat Sabah)

== State election results ==
Sabah State Legislative Assembly
Election	Votes		Seats			Position (Note: As part of electoral coalition.)	Status
Election	Count	%	Result	Won / contested	+/–	Position	Status
1985	100,486	36.4	25 / 48	25 / 45	▲25	1st	PBS–PASOK
1986	166,136	53.7	34 / 48	34 / 47	▲9	1st	PBS (Note: BN (1986 general election–1990))
1990	197,708	53.9	36 / 48	36 / 48	▲2	1st (Barisan Nasional) (Note: PBS contested on its own against other BN member USNO)	PBS (Note: BN (1990), de facto PBS–USNO (1993–1994))
1994	215,952	49.7	25 / 48	25 / 48	▼11	1st	PBS (1994)
1994	215,952	49.7	25 / 48	25 / 48	▼11	1st	Opposition (1994–1999)
1999	213,432	41.3	17 / 48	17 / 48	▼8	▼2nd	Opposition (1999–2002)
1999	213,432	41.3	17 / 48	17 / 48	▼8	▼2nd	BN (2002–2004)
2004	58,960	14.0	13 / 60	13 / 13	▼4	1st (Barisan Nasional)	BN
2008	68,221	12.9	12 / 60	12 / 13	▼1	1st (Barisan Nasional)	BN
2013	77,983	10.1	7 / 60	7 / 13	▼5	1st (Barisan Nasional)	BN
2018	72,360	8.6	6 / 60	6 / 13	▼1	1st (Barisan Nasional)	BN–STAR (2018)
2018	72,360	8.6	6 / 60	6 / 13	▼1	1st (Barisan Nasional)	Opposition (2018–2020)
2020	49,941	6.8	7 / 73	7 / 22	▲1	1st (Gabungan Rakyat Sabah)	GRS (2020–2023) (Note: GRS–BN (2022–2023))
2020	49,941	6.8	7 / 73	7 / 22	▲1	1st (Gabungan Rakyat Sabah)	GRS–PH (2023–2025)
2025	49,058	4.3	6 / 73	6 / 10	▼1	1st (Gabungan Rakyat Sabah)	GRS–PH–BN

Note

State election	State Legislative Assembly													
State election	Perlis	Kedah	Kelantan	Terengganu	Penang	Perak	Pahang	Selangor	Negeri Sembilan	Malacca	Johor	Sabah	Sarawak	Total won / Total contested
2/3 majority	2 / 3	2 / 3	2 / 3	2 / 3	2 / 3	2 / 3	2 / 3	2 / 3	2 / 3	2 / 3	2 / 3	2 / 3	2 / 3	
1995		0 / 36			0 / 33						0 / 40			0 / 9
2016													0 / 80	0 / 30
2018												6 / 79		6 / 13
2020												7 / 73		7 / 23
2025												7 / 73		7 / 11
