= United Sabah Alliance =

United Sabah Alliance Gabungan Sabah Bersatu
- Abbreviation: USA
- Founded: 21 November 2016
- Dissolved: 13 June 2018
- Preceded by: United Borneo Alliance
- Succeeded by: United Alliance
- Headquarters: Kota Kinabalu, Sabah
- Youth wing: Pemuda GABUNGAN
- Membership (2016–2018): 423,493
- Ideology: Nationalism; Sabah regionalism Economic liberalism
- Political position: Centre-right
- Colours: Black, red, white and green
- Slogan: Perpaduan Orang-Orang Sabah Untuk Sabah (Unity for the Sabahans for Sabah!); Pertahankan hak-hak Rakyat Sabah dan Tanah Sabah! (Defend the Sabahans' rights and the State of Sabah!)

Website
- www.gabungansabah.com

The United Sabah Alliance (Malay: Gabungan Sabah Bersatu; abbreviated: USA) was a political coalition bringing together Sabah-based parties in Malaysia. It was jointly founded by the Sabah Progressive Party (SAPP) and Homeland Solidarity Party (STAR) after the SAPP left the Barisan Nasional coalition. The Love Sabah Party joined the coalition but left in 2017 due to disagreements. Later, the Sabah People's Hope Party (PHRS) and Sabah People's Unity Party (PPRS) joined the coalition. However, after the 2018 general election, PHRS left the coalition.

== General election results ==
Election	Total seats won	Total votes	Voting Percentage	Outcome of election	Election leader
2018	2 / 222	63,978	7.58		

== See also ==
- List of political parties in Malaysia
- Politics of Malaysia
- Jeffrey Kitingan
- United Borneo Alliance
- United Alliance (Sabah)
