= United Borneo Alliance =

- Abbreviation: UBA
- Chairman: Jeffrey Kitingan
- Founder: Jeffrey Kitingan; Dr Dripin Sakoi
- Founded: 3 January 2012
- Dissolved: 8 March 2015
- Succeeded by: United Sabah Alliance
- Headquarters: Kota Kinabalu, Sabah
- Membership (2015): 99,987
- Ideology: Nationalism; Borneo regionalism Economic liberalism

United Borneo Alliance (abbreviated UBA), was formed by Jeffrey Kitingan in 2012 after he launched the Sabah chapter of Sarawak-based State Reform Party (STAR). Jeffrey also had earlier set-up the preceding United Borneo Front (UBF), the formation of an alliance comprising the State Reform Party (STAR), United Sabah National Organisation (USNO), Sabah Progressive Party (SAPP) and Sarawak National Party (SNAP). The Borneo-based parties from Sabah and Sarawak, which would promote a system similar to the "One country, two systems" in China, intend on using the platform to educate the people of Sabah and Sarawak in order to bring about a better quality of life.

In 2015, Jeffrey merged the UBA into the newly formed United Sabah Alliance (USA), alongside relaunching the Sabah chapter of the State Reform Party as Parti Solidariti Tanah Airku, a separate entity while retaining the acronym of STAR. The United Sabah Alliance was succeeded by the similarly named United Alliance of Sabah in 2018.

== General election results ==
Election	Total seats won	Seats contested	Total votes	Voting Percentage	Outcome of election	Election leader
2013	6 / 222	13	194,324	1.25%	▲4 seats; Governing coalition (SAPP & STAR)	Hajiji Noor

== See also ==
- List of political parties in Malaysia
- Politics of Malaysia
- Jeffrey Kitingan
- State Reform Party
- United Sabah Alliance
