= United Alliance of Sabah =

- Malay name: Gabungan Bersatu Sabah
- Abbreviation: G.B.S
- Chairman: Joseph Pairin Kitingan
- Deputy Chairmen: Maximus Ongkili; Jeffrey Kitingan; Joseph Kurup; Anifah Aman
- Secretary-General: Johnny Juani Mositun
- Founded: 13 June 2018
- Dissolved: 12 September 2020
- Preceded by: Barisan Nasional-Sabah; Gabungan Sabah
- Succeeded by: Gabungan Rakyat Sabah
- Headquarters: Kota Kinabalu, Sabah
- Youth wing: Pergerakan Pemuda Parti
- Ideology: Sabah regionalism
- Political position: Centre-right
- Colours: Light blue and green

The United Alliance of Sabah (Malay: Gabungan Bersatu Sabah; abbreviated: GBS) was a political coalition bringing together Sabah-based opposition parties in Malaysia established by Joseph Pairin Kitingan following the fall of the Barisan Nasional coalition in the 2018 Malaysian general election. The new coalition was intended to include the United Sabah Party, Homeland Solidarity Party and remnants of former Sabah BN members, mainly those of the United Malays National Organisation's Sabah branch led by Musa Aman who was rumoured to have intended on joining to PBS. However, no such move materialised, with Musa Aman remaining a member of UMNO and BN.

GBS was founded by 5 political parties in Sabah namely Parti Bersatu Rakyat Sabah (PBRS), Parti Bersatu Sabah (PBS), Parti Solidariti Tanah Air-ku Sabah (STAR Sabah), Sabah Progressive Party (SAPP) and Independently-built UMNO Sabah.

In February 2020, during the 2020-2022 Malaysian political crisis, the GBS coalition supports the Perikatan Nasional (PN) coalition in forming a new federal government. Subsequently, PBRS rejoined Barisan Nasional, while SAPP and STAR joined Perikatan Nasional, while PBS remained independent of either peninsula-based coalition, maintain the GBS coalition until September 12, 2020.

These parties then merged through their respective coalitions to form the Gabungan Rakyat Sabah (GRS), a local coalition rebranded from GBS coalition and founded by Hajiji Noor to face the Sabah state election in September 2020.
