= Homeland Solidarity Party =

Political party of Malaysia

- Malay name: Parti Solidariti Tanah Airku
- Abbreviation: STAR
- President: Jeffrey Kitingan
- Secretary-General: Edward Linggu Bukut
- Founder: Jeffrey Kitingan
- Split from: State Reform Party Sarawak; PKR Sabah
- Preceded by: State Reform Party (Sabah Branch) - (Founded by Patau Rubis)
- Headquarters: Kota Kinabalu, Sabah
- Ideology: Sabah regionalism
- National affiliation: Sabah Progressive Party (since 2016); National Unity Government (since 2022) (Note: The party was formerly part of the United Sabah Alliance (2016–2018), United Alliance of Sabah (2018–2020), Perikatan Nasional (2020–2022), and Gabungan Rakyat Sabah (2020–2025). Through PN it was aligned with Barisan Nasional (2020–2022) and Gabungan Parti Sarawak (2020–2022).)
- Colours: Light blue, red, orange and pink
- Slogan: "Kalau bukan kita, siapa lagi? Kalau bukan sekarang, bila lagi?" If not us, who? If not now, when?; "Ini kali lah! Kita mesti menang!" Now is the time! We must win!; "STAR! STAR! STAR! - Bersatulah Rakyat Sabah!!" STAR! STAR! STAR! - People of Sabah, unite!!
- Anthem: Bintang Borneo
- Dewan Negara: 1 / 70
- Dewan Rakyat: 1 / 26 (Sabah and Labuan seats)
- Dewan Undangan Negeri: 2 / 79
- State Chief Ministers (Sabah): 0 / 13

Election symbol

Website
- www.starsabah.org

Homeland Solidarity Party (Malay: Parti Solidariti Tanah Airku; abbrev: STAR) is a Sabah-based political party in Malaysia. The party was founded by Jeffrey Kitingan. STAR was one of four founding parties of the United Sabah Alliance (USA) founded in 2016, United Alliance of Sabah (UAOS) founded in 2018, and Gabungan Rakyat Sabah (GRS) founded in 2020.

The party briefly entered into an alliance with the Barisan Nasional (BN) coalition following the 2018 Sabah state election, forming the state government there. It later joined the Perikatan Nasional (PN) coalition, with Jeffrey Kitingan briefly serving as a federal minister. The party returned to power in Sabah as part of the Gabungan Rakyat Sabah (GRS), an informal alliance formed to contest 2020 Sabah state snap-election. It left Perikatan Nasional in 2022, and Gabungan Rakyat Sabah in 2025.

The party's base mainly consist of Sabah's non-Muslim native population, which are often collectively referred to as the Kadazan-Dusun Murut (KDM).

== History ==
The party was originally founded as the STAR Sabah in 2012, becoming the Sabahan branch of the Sarawak-based State Reform Party (STAR). In 2016, it rebranded itself as the Homeland Solidarity Party (Parti Solidariti Tanah Airku) while retaining the STAR acronym, and broke away from the Sarawak-based mother party, which also underwent a rebranding exercise.

It has been led by Jeffrey Kitingan, a Sabah rights activist and the younger brother of one-time chief minister and former United Sabah Party leader Joseph Pairin Kitingan, since its founding.

== Party Organisational Structure (2024–2027) ==
- Chairman:
  - Fred Vincent Marukau
- Deputy Chairman:
  - Japlin Asrakal
- President:
  - Jeffrey Gapari Kitingan
- Deputy President:
  - Datuk Lawrence Gimbang (Non-Muslim Bumiputera)
  - Datuk Mohd Ishak Ayub (Muslim Bumiputera)
  - Kenny Chua Teck Ho (Chinese)
- Vice-Presidents:
  - Vacant (Non-Muslim Bumiputera)
  - Suling Isib (Non-Muslim Bumiputera)
  - Apas Nawawi Saking (Muslim Bumiputera)
  - Mohd Lin Harun (Muslim Bumiputera)
  - Kong Soon Choi (Chinese)
  - Beverley Natalie Koh (Chinese)
  - Vacant (Appointed)
  - Vacant (Appointed)
- Youth Chief:
  - Nelson Martin Idang
- Women's Chief:
  - Kerry Chee Kheng Moi
- Secretary-General:
  - Edward Linggu Bukut
- Assistant Secretaries-General:
  - Rizal Johari
  - Prem Beachile Kitingan
- Organising Secretary:
  - Terence Sinti
- Treasurer-General:
  - Arlinsia Agang
- Assistant Treasurer-General:
  - Mohd Raffee Shakir
- Information Chief:
  - Mohd Anuar Abdul Ghani
- Deputy Information Chief:
  - Ardino Diris
- Strategic Director:
  - Dr. Paul Porodong
- Communications Director:
  - Jalumin Bayogoh
- Supreme Council Members (elected):
  - Baritus Gungkit @ Evaristus
  - Alviana Linus
  - Anita Baranting
  - Maklin Masiau
  - Fung Len Fui
  - Jovilis Majami
  - Susy Lojimit
  - Raplin Samat
- Supreme Council Members (appointed):
  - Lawrence Gimbang
  - Johari Pongod
  - Andrew Ambrose Mudi @ Atama

== Elected representatives ==
=== Senators ===
- Sabah State Legislative Assembly:
  - Edward Linggu Bukut

=== Dewan Rakyat (House of Representatives) ===
STAR currently has only one MP in the House of Representatives.

State	No.	Parliament Constituency	Member	Party
Sabah	P180	Keningau	Jeffrey Kitingan	STAR
Sabah	Total	Sabah (1)		

=== Dewan Undangan Negeri (State Legislative Assembly) ===
Sabah State Legislative Assembly

2 / 79

State	No.	Parliamentary Constituency	No.	Sabah State Legislative Assembly	Member	Party
Sabah	P180	Keningau	N39	Tambunan	Jeffrey Kitingan	STAR
Sabah	P180	Keningau	N40	Bingkor	Mohd Ishak Ayub	STAR
Total	Sabah (2)					

== Government offices ==
=== State governments ===
STAR currently serves as junior partner in GRS government.

- Sabah (2018, 2020–present)

Note: bold as Menteri Besar/Chief Minister, italic as junior partner

== General election results ==
Election	Total seats won	Seats contested	Total votes	Voting Percentage	Outcome of election	Election leader
2018	1 / 222	5	21,361	0.18%	▲1 seats; Opposition coalition, (United Sabah Alliance) later Governing coalition, (Perikatan Nasional)	Jeffrey Kitingan
2022	1 / 222	2	29,874	0.19%	; Governing coalition, (Gabungan Rakyat Sabah)	Jeffrey Kitingan

== State election results ==
Sabah State Legislative Assembly
Election	Votes		Seats			Position (Note: As part of electoral coalition.)	Status
Election	Count	%	Result	Won / contested	+/–	Position	Status
2018	39,803	4.7	2 / 60	2 / 18	▲2	4th (United Sabah Alliance)	BN–STAR (2018)
2018	39,803	4.7	2 / 60	2 / 18	▲2	4th (United Sabah Alliance)	Opposition (2018–2020)
2020	35,586	4.9	6 / 73	6 / 8	▲4	▲1st (Gabungan Rakyat Sabah)	GRS (2020–2023)
2020	35,586	4.9	6 / 73	6 / 8	▲4	▲1st (Gabungan Rakyat Sabah)	GRS–PH (2023–2025)
2025	73,410	6.5	2 / 73	2 / 46	▼4	▼5th	GRS–PH–BN
