= Sipitang (federal constituency) =

Federal constituency of Sabah, Malaysia

Sipitang (P178)
Sabah constituency

Federal constituency
- Legislature: Dewan Rakyat
- MP: Matbali Musah; GRS
- Constituency created: 1994
- First contested: 1995
- Last contested: 2022

Demographics
- Population (2020): 66,583
- Electors (2025): 47,701
- Area (km²): 3,715
- Pop. density (per km²): 17.9

Sipitang is a federal constituency in Interior Division (Beaufort District and Sipitang District), Sabah, Malaysia, that has been represented in the Dewan Rakyat since 1995.

The federal constituency was created in the 1994 redistribution and is mandated to return a single member to the Dewan Rakyat under the first past the post voting system.

== Demographics ==
Ethnic breakdown of Sipitang's electorate as of 2022
1. Sabah Bumiputera (66.2%)
2. Malay-Muslim Bumiputera (24.6%)
3. Chinese (5.50%)
4. Other ethnicities (3.60%)

As of 2020, Sipitang has a population of 66,583 people.

Age breakdown of Sipitang's electorate as of 2022
1. 18-20 (6.73%)
2. 21-29 (22.3%)
3. 30-39 (23.3%)
4. 40-49 (17.1%)
5. 50-59 (14.5%)
6. 60-69 (10.2%)
7. 70-79 (3.62%)
8. 80-89 (1.53%)
9. above 90 (0.69%)
Gender breakdown of Sipitang's electorate as of 2022
1. Male (50.8%)
2. Female (49.2%)

== History ==
=== Polling districts ===
According to the gazette issued on 21 November 2025, the Sipitang constituency has a total of 30 polling districts.

State constituency	Polling District	Code	Location
Lumadan (N34)	Kabajang	178/34/01	SK Kabajang
Lumadan (N34)	Gadong	178/34/02	SK Gadong; SK Garama
Lumadan (N34)	Lupak	178/34/03	SK Lupak
Lumadan (N34)	Padas Valley	178/34/04	SK Luagan
Lumadan (N34)	Beaufort Selatan	178/34/05	SK Pekan Beaufort; SMK Beaufort III
Lumadan (N34)	Lumadan	178/34/06	SK Ladang-Lumadan
Lumadan (N34)	Bukau	178/34/07	SK Bukau
Lumadan (N34)	Suasa	178/34/08	SK Suasa
Lumadan (N34)	Padas Demit	178/34/09	SK Padas Damit
Lumadan (N34)	Bankalalak	178/34/10	SK Bangkalalak
Lumadan (N34)	Weston	178/34/11	SK Weston; SMK Weston
Lumadan (N34)	Lubok	178/34/12	SK Lubok
Lumadan (N34)	Lingkungan	178/34/13	SK Lingkungan; SK Maraba
Sindumin (N35)	Banting	178/35/01	SK Banting
Sindumin (N35)	Sindumin	178/35/02	SK Sindumin
Sindumin (N35)	Marintaman	178/35/03	SK Merintaman
Sindumin (N35)	Bandar Sipitang	178/35/04	SK Pekan Sipitang; SMK Pengiran Omar
Sindumin (N35)	Mesapol	178/35/05	SJK (C) Chung Hwa Mesapol; SMK Pengiran Omar II
Sindumin (N35)	Usuk	178/35/06	SK Melalia
Sindumin (N35)	Ulu Sipitang	178/35/07	SK Ulu Sipitang
Sindumin (N35)	Pantai	178/35/08	SK Pantai; SK Lubang Buaya
Sindumin (N35)	Melamam	178/35/09	SK Melamam
Sindumin (N35)	Mendolong	178/35/10	SK Mendulong
Sindumin (N35)	Kelangsat	178/35/11	SK Kelangsat
Sindumin (N35)	Bole	178/35/12	SK Ulu Bole
Sindumin (N35)	Meligan	178/35/13	SK Meligan
Sindumin (N35)	Long Pasia	178/35/14	SK Long Pasia
Sindumin (N35)	Iburu	178/35/15	Balai Kebudayaan Iburu
Sindumin (N35)	Tanjung Pagar	178/35/16	SK Padang Berampah; SMK Padang Berampah
Sindumin (N35)	Kuala Muaya	178/35/17	SK Kebawang

=== Representation history ===
Members of Parliament for Sipitang
Parliament	No	Years	Member	Party	Vote Share
Constituency created from Padas and Limbawang
9th	P155	1995-1999	Yusof Yacob (يوسف يعقوب)	BN (UMNO)	9,732; 64.44%
10th	P155	1999-2004	Yusof Yacob (يوسف يعقوب)	BN (UMNO)	9,581; 64.01%
11th	P178	2004-2008	Yusof Yacob (يوسف يعقوب)	BN (UMNO)	Uncontested
12th	P178	2008-2013	Sapawi Ahmad (صڤاوي أحمد)	BN (UMNO)	11,905; 67.40%
13th	P178	2013-2018	Sapawi Ahmad (صڤاوي أحمد)	BN (UMNO)	16,377; 68.84%
14th	P178	2018	Yamani Hafez Musa (يماني حفيظ موسى)	BN (UMNO)	12,038; 48.60%
14th	P178	2018-2019	Yamani Hafez Musa (يماني حفيظ موسى)	Independent	12,038; 48.60%
14th	P178	2019-2020	Yamani Hafez Musa (يماني حفيظ موسى)	PH (BERSATU)	12,038; 48.60%
14th	P178	2020–2022	Yamani Hafez Musa (يماني حفيظ موسى)	GRS (BERSATU)	12,038; 48.60%
15th	P178	2022	Matbali Musah (متبلي موسى)	GRS (BERSATU)	14,459; 49.75%
15th	P178	2022–present	Matbali Musah (متبلي موسى)	GRS (Direct)	14,459; 49.75%

=== State constituency ===
Parliamentary constituency	State constituency					
Parliamentary constituency	1967–1974	1974–1985	1985–1995	1995–2004	2004–2020	2020–present
Sipitang				Lumadan		
Sipitang				Sindumin		

=== Historical boundaries ===
State Constituency	Area		
State Constituency	1994	2003	2019
Lumadan	Padas; Pukau; Lingkungan; Lumadan; Weston		
Sindumin	Long Pasia; Melalia; Mesapol; Sindumin; Sipitang		

=== Current state assembly members ===
No.	State Constituency	Member	Coalition (Party)
N34	Lumadan	Ruslan Muharam	GRS (PBS)
N35	Sindumin	Yusri Pungut	WARISAN

=== Local governments & postcodes ===
No.	State Constituency	Local Government	Postcodes
N34	Lumadan	Beaufort District Council	89800 Beaufort; 89850 Sipitang
N35	Sindumin	Sipitang District Council	89800 Beaufort; 89850 Sipitang

== Election results ==
Malaysian general election, 2022
Party	Candidate	Votes	%	∆%
GRS	Matbali Musah	14,459	49.75	▲49.75
Heritage	Adnan Puteh	9,768	33.61	▼11.55
PH	Lahirul Latigu	4,834	16.63	▲16.63
Total valid votes		29,061	100.00	
Total rejected ballots		552		
Unreturned ballots		74		
Turnout		29,924	63.35	▼16.58
Registered electors		45,871		
Majority		4,691	16.14	▲12.70
GRS gain from BN		Swing		?
Source(s) https://lom.agc.gov.my/ilims/upload/portal/akta/outputp/1753262/PUB619_2022.pdf

Malaysian general election, 2018
Party	Candidate	Votes	%	∆%
BN	Yamani Hafez Musa	12,038	48.60	▼20.24
Sabah Heritage Party	Noor Hayaty Mustapha	11,186	45.16	▲45.16
Sabah People's Hope Party	Dayang Aezzy Liman	1,547	6.25	▲6.25
Total valid votes		24,771	100.00	
Total rejected ballots		596		
Unreturned ballots		116		
Turnout		25,483	79.93	▼3.65
Registered electors		31,882		
Majority		852	3.44	▼36.36
BN hold		Swing		
Source(s) "His Majesty's Government Gazette - Notice of Contested Election, Parliament for the State of Sabah [P.U. (B) 246/2018]" (PDF). Attorney General's Chambers of Malaysia. 3 May 2018. "Federal Government Gazette - Results of Contested Election and Statements of the Poll after the Official Addition of Votes, Parliamentary Constituencies for the State of Sabah [P.U. (B) 320/2018]" (PDF). Attorney General's Chambers of Malaysia. 28 May 2018.

Malaysian general election, 2013
Party	Candidate	Votes	%	∆%
BN	Sapawi Amat Wasali @ Ahmad	16,377	68.84	▲1.44
PKR	Ramle Dua @ Ramli Dua Lee	6,908	29.04	▼3.56
SAPP	Kamis Daming	505	2.12	▲2.12
Total valid votes		23,790	100.00	
Total rejected ballots		539		
Unreturned ballots		58		
Turnout		24,387	83.58	▲8.16
Registered electors		29,177		
Majority		9,469	39.80	▲5.00
BN hold		Swing		
Source(s) "Federal Government Gazette - Notice of Contested Election, Parliament for the State of Sabah [P.U. (B) 183/2013]" (PDF). Attorney General's Chambers of Malaysia. 26 April 2013. "Federal Government Gazette - Results of Contested Election and Statements of the Poll after the Official Addition of Votes, Parliamentary Constituencies for the State of Sabah [P.U. (B) 224/2013]" (PDF). Attorney General's Chambers of Malaysia. 22 May 2013.

Malaysian general election, 2008
Party	Candidate	Votes	%	∆%
BN	Sapawi Amat Wasali @ Ahmad	11,905	67.40	
PKR	Karim @ Abdul Karim Tassim	5,759	32.60	
Total valid votes		17,664	100.00	
Total rejected ballots		531		
Unreturned ballots		16		
Turnout		18,211	75.42	
Registered electors		24,145		
Majority		6,146	34.80	
BN hold		Swing		

Malaysian general election, 2004
Party	Candidate	Votes	%	∆%
On the nomination day, Yusof Yacob won uncontested.
BN	Yusof Yacob			
Total valid votes			100.00	
Total rejected ballots				
Unreturned ballots				
Turnout				
Registered electors		23,542		
Majority				
BN hold		Swing		

Malaysian general election, 1999
Party	Candidate	Votes	%	∆%
BN	Yusof Yacob	9,581	64.01	▼0.43
PKR	Abdul Rahman Md. Yakub	5,242	35.02	▲35.02
Independent	Ag. Ku Tengah Pg. Damit	145	0.97	▲0.97
Total valid votes		14,968	100.00	
Total rejected ballots		186		
Unreturned ballots		27		
Turnout		15,181	68.74	▼5.62
Registered electors		22,084		
Majority		4,339	28.99	▼0.96
BN hold		Swing		

Malaysian general election, 1995
Party	Candidate	Votes	%
BN	Yusof Yacob	9,732	64.44
PBS	Jamilah Sulaiman	5,208	34.49
Independent	Hussin Masalih	162	1.07
Total valid votes		15,102	100.00
Total rejected ballots		208	
Unreturned ballots		14	
Turnout		15,324	74.36
Registered electors		20,269	
Majority		4,524	29.95
This was a new constituency created.
