= Riduan Rubin =

Malaysian politician

Yang Berhormat Tuan Riduan Rubin MP
- رضوان روبين

Member of the Malaysian Parliament for Tenom
- Incumbent
- Assumed office 19 November 2022
- Preceded by: Noorita Sual (PH–DAP)
- Majority: 1,108 (2022)

Personal details
- Born: Riduan bin Rubin
- Citizenship: Malaysian
- Party: Malaysian United Indigenous Party of Sabah (Sabah BERSATU) (–2022); Independent (Oct 2022–Nov 2022); Social Democratic Harmony Party (KDM) (since 2022)
- Other political affiliations: Perikatan Nasional (PN) (–2022); Gabungan Rakyat Sabah (GRS) (–2022)
- Parent: Rubin Balang (father)
- Occupation: Politician

Riduan bin Rubin is a Malaysian politician who has served as the Member of Parliament (MP) for Tenom from November 2022. He is a member of the Social Democratic Harmony Party (KDM). He was an independent and a former member of the Malaysian United Indigenous Party of Sabah (Sabah BERSATU), a former component party of the Gabungan Rakyat Sabah (GRS) coalition and a component party of the Perikatan Nasional (PN) coalition. He is one of the two KDM MPs along with Kota Marudu MP Wetrom Bahanda and one of the two independent candidates who was elected in the 2022 general election along with Kudat MP Verdon Bahanda. He is also the son of Rubin Balang, the Member of the Sabah State Legislative Assembly (MLA) for Kemabong and the Vice President II of Parti Gagasan Rakyat Sabah (Gagasan Rakyat).

== Political career ==
=== Member of Parliament (since 2022) ===
==== 2022 general election ====
In the 2022 general election, Riduan made his electoral debut after nominating himself to contest for the Tenom federal seat as an independent candidate. After that, he joined KDM temporarily in only 3 weeks before KDM joined coup d'etat with WARISAN and BN Sabah. He won the seat and was elected into Parliament as the Tenom MP after defeating defending MP Noorita Sual of Pakatan Harapan (PH), Jamawi Ja'afar of the Barisan Nasional (BN), Ukim Buandi of the Heritage Party (WARISAN) and another independent candidate Peggy Chaw Zhi Ting by a majority of 1,108 votes.

== Election results ==
Parliament of Malaysia
Year	Constituency	Candidate	Votes	Pct	Opponent(s)	Votes	Pct	Ballots cast	Majority	Turnout
2022	P181 Tenom	Riduan Rubin (IND) (Note: He was a member of KDM but he contested as an independent instead of a candidate of KDM in the 2022 general election.)	10,027	35.00%	Noorita Sual (DAP)	8,919	31.13%	28,649	1,108	68.14%
2022	P181 Tenom	Riduan Rubin (IND)	10,027	35.00%	Jamawi Ja'afar (UMNO)	8,625	30.11%	28,649	1,108	68.14%
2022	P181 Tenom	Riduan Rubin (IND)	10,027	35.00%	Ukim Buandi (WARISAN)	992	3.46%	28,649	1,108	68.14%
2022	P181 Tenom	Riduan Rubin (IND)	10,027	35.00%	Peggy Chaw Zhi Ting (IND)	86	0.30%	28,649	1,108	68.14%

== Honours ==
=== Honours of Malaysia ===
- Malaysia
  - Recipient of the 17th Yang di-Pertuan Agong Installation Medal (2024)
