= Tenom (federal constituency) =

Federal constituency of Sabah, Malaysia

Tenom (P181)
Sabah constituency

Federal constituency
- Legislature: Dewan Rakyat
- MP: Riduan Rubin; KDM
- Constituency created: 1994
- First contested: 1995
- Last contested: 2022

Demographics
- Population (2020): 50,230
- Electors (2025): 44,488
- Area (km²): 2,451
- Pop. density (per km²): 20.5

Tenom is a federal constituency in Interior Division (Tenom District), Sabah, Malaysia, that has been represented in the Dewan Rakyat since 1995. It has been represented by Riduan Rubin of the Social Democratic Harmony Party (KDM) since 2022.

The federal constituency was created in the 1994 redistribution and is mandated to return a single member to the Dewan Rakyat under the first past the post voting system.

== Demographics ==
https://ge15.orientaldaily.com.my/seats/sabah/p

Ethnic breakdown of Tenom's electorate as of 2022
1. Sabah Bumiputera (72.4%)
2. Malay-Muslim Bumiputera (12.8%)
3. Chinese (11.9%)
4. Other ethnicities (2.80%)

As of 2020, Tenom has a population of 50,230 people.

Age breakdown of Tenom's electorate as of 2022
1. 18-20 (7.64%)
2. 21-29 (22.3%)
3. 30-39 (23.7%)
4. 40-49 (16.9%)
5. 50-59 (13.9%)
6. 60-69 (9.22%)
7. 70-79 (3.36%)
8. 80-89 (1.68%)
9. above 90 (1.31%)
Gender breakdown of Tenom's electorate as of 2022
1. Male (50.0%)
2. Female (50.0%)

== History ==
=== Polling districts ===
According to the gazette issued on 21 November 2025, the Tenom constituency has a total of 22 polling districts.

State constituency	Polling District	Code	Location
Melalap (N42)	Pamilaan	181/42/01	SK St Pius Pamilaan
Melalap (N42)	Melalap	181/42/02	SK Melalap
Melalap (N42)	Lagud	181/42/03	SK Lagud
Melalap (N42)	Kalang	181/42/04	SM Tshung Tsin Tenom
Melalap (N42)	Tenom Utara	181/42/05	SJK (C) Chung Hwa
Melalap (N42)	Tenom Selatan	181/42/06	SK Pekan Tenom
Melalap (N42)	Saga	181/42/07	SK Saga
Melalap (N42)	Mandalom	181/42/08	SK Mandalom Lama; SMK Entabuan
Melalap (N42)	Pangi	181/42/09	SK Pangi
Melalap (N42)	Pagukon	181/42/10	SK Pagukon
Kemabong (N43)	Chinta Mata	181/43/01	SK Chinta Mata; SJK (C) Tsi Sin
Kemabong (N43)	Sapong	181/43/02	SK Ladang Sapong
Kemabong (N43)	Mansasoh	181/43/03	SK Sungai Api
Kemabong (N43)	Enubai	181/43/04	SK Inubai
Kemabong (N43)	Paal	181/43/05	SJK (C) Yuk Nam
Kemabong (N43)	Baru Jumpa	181/43/06	SK Kg Baru Jumpa
Kemabong (N43)	Kemabong	181/43/07	SMK Kemabong; SK Kemabong; SK Korolok
Kemabong (N43)	Tomani	181/43/08	SK Kuala Tomani
Kemabong (N43)	Rundum	181/43/09	SK Rundum
Kemabong (N43)	Kapulu	181/43/10	SK Kapalu
Kemabong (N43)	Katuboh	181/43/11	Rumah Kebudayaan Katubuh
Kemabong (N43)	Ulu Tomani	181/43/12	SK Ulu Tomani; SK Tilis; SK Kungkular; SK Sumambu

=== Representation history ===
Members of Parliament for Tenom
Parliament	No	Years	Member	Party	Vote Share
Constituency created from Padas, Pensiangan and Keningau
9th	P158	1995-1999	Radin Malleh	PBS	9,949; 58.25%
10th	P158	1999-2004	Rizalman Abdullah (ريزلمن عبدالله)	BN (UMNO)	11,179; 59.73%
11th	P181	2004-2008	Raime Unggi (رايم اوڠڬي)	BN (UMNO)	8,032; 58.80%
12th	P181	2008-2013	Raime Unggi (رايم اوڠڬي)	BN (UMNO)	9,535; 62.85%
13th	P181	2013-2018	Raime Unggi (رايم اوڠڬي)	BN (UMNO)	9,771; 48.15%
14th	P181	2018-2022	Noorita Sual	PH (DAP)	11,363; 51.10%
15th	P181	2022–present	Riduan Rubin (رضوان روبين)	KDM	10,027; 35.00%

=== State constituency ===
Parliamentary constituency	State constituency					
Parliamentary constituency	1967–1974	1974–1985	1985–1995	1995–2004	2004–2020	2020–present
Tenom				Kemabong		
Tenom				Melalap		

=== Historical boundaries ===
State Constituency	Area		
State Constituency	1994	2003	2019
Kemabong	Katubuh; Kampung Baru Jumpa; Kemabong; Mansasoh; Tomani		
Melalap	Kampung Lingkudau; Kampung Kauran; Melalap; Mentalik; Tenom	Melalap; Mentalik; Pamilaan; Pangi; Tenom	

=== Current state assembly members ===
No.	State Constituency	Member	Coalition (Party)
N42	Melalap	Jamawi Ja'afar	PH (PKR)
N43	Kemabong	Rubin Balang	GRS (GAGASAN)

=== Local governments & postcodes ===
No.	State Constituency	Local Government	Postcodes
N42	Melalap	Tenom District Council	89900 Tenom
N43	Kemabong	Tenom District Council	89900 Tenom

== Election results ==
Malaysian general election, 2022
Party	Candidate	Votes	%	∆%
Independent	Riduan Rubin	10,027	35.00	▲35.00
PH	Noorita Sual	8,919	31.13	▲31.13
BN	Jamawi Ja’afar	8,625	30.11	▼15.89
Heritage	Ukim Buandi	992	3.46	▲3.46
Independent	Peggy Chaw Zhi Ting	86	0.30	▲0.30
Total valid votes		28,649	100.00	
Total rejected ballots		385		
Unreturned ballots		44		
Turnout		29,078	68.14	▼10.77
Registered electors		42,045		
Majority		1,108	3.87	▼1.22
Independent gain from DAP		Swing		?
Source(s) https://lom.agc.gov.my/ilims/upload/portal/akta/outputp/1753262/PUB619_2022.pdf

Malaysian general election, 2018
Party	Candidate	Votes	%	∆%
DAP	Noorita Sual	11,363	51.10	▲51.10
BN	Rubin Balang	10,230	46.00	▼2.15
Homeland Solidarity Party	Laimoi @ Yuslinah Laikim	645	2.90	▼9.17
Total valid votes		22,238	100.00	
Total rejected ballots		661		
Unreturned ballots		128		
Turnout		23,027	78.91	▼3.86
Registered electors		29,182		
Majority		1,133	5.09	▼14.06
DAP gain from BN		Swing		?
Source(s) "His Majesty's Government Gazette - Notice of Contested Election, Parliament for the State of Sabah [P.U. (B) 246/2018]" (PDF). Attorney General's Chambers of Malaysia. 3 May 2018. "Federal Government Gazette - Results of Contested Election and Statements of the Poll after the Official Addition of Votes, Parliamentary Constituencies for the State of Sabah [P.U. (B) 320/2018]" (PDF). Attorney General's Chambers of Malaysia. 28 May 2018. Archived from the original (PDF) on 2019-12-29.

Malaysian general election, 2013
Party	Candidate	Votes	%	∆%
BN	Raime Unggi	9,771	48.15	▼14.70
PKR	Masdin Tumas	5,885	29.00	▲11.52
STAR	Hasmin @ Azroy Abdullah	2,449	12.07	▲12.07
SAPP	Jaineh Juaya @ Jimmy Jawatah	1,766	8.70	▲8.70
KITA	Mutang @ Sylvester Dawat	423	2.08	▲2.08
Total valid votes		20,294	100.00	
Total rejected ballots		632		
Unreturned ballots		18		
Turnout		20,944	82.77	▲7.53
Registered electors		25,304		
Majority		3,886	19.15	▼26.22
BN hold		Swing		
Source(s) "Federal Government Gazette - Notice of Contested Election, Parliament for the State of Sabah [P.U. (B) 183/2013]" (PDF). Attorney General's Chambers of Malaysia. 26 April 2013. Archived from the original (PDF) on 2018-09-30. "Federal Government Gazette - Results of Contested Election and Statements of the Poll after the Official Addition of Votes, Parliamentary Constituencies for the State of Sabah [P.U. (B) 224/2013]" (PDF). Attorney General's Chambers of Malaysia. 22 May 2013. Archived from the original (PDF) on 2018-09-30.

Malaysian general election, 2008
Party	Candidate	Votes	%	∆%
BN	Raime Unggi	9,535	62.85	▲4.05
PKR	Adris Taripin	2,652	17.48	▲17.48
Independent	Joh Jimmy @ Richard Joe Jimmy	2,499	16.47	▲16.47
BERSEKUTU	Mutang @ Sylvester Dawat	485	3.20	▲3.20
Total valid votes		15,171	100.00	
Total rejected ballots		523		
Unreturned ballots		11		
Turnout		15,705	75.24	▲6.36
Registered electors		20,874		
Majority		6,883	45.37	▲27.77
BN hold		Swing		

Malaysian general election, 2004
Party	Candidate	Votes	%	∆%
BN	Raime Unggi	8,032	58.80	▼0.93
Independent	Limun Laikim	5,628	41.20	▲41.20
Total valid votes		13,660	100.00	
Total rejected ballots		396		
Unreturned ballots		7		
Turnout		14,063	68.88	▼0.05
Registered electors		20,417		
Majority		2,404	17.60	▼1.86
BN hold		Swing		

Malaysian general election, 1999
Party	Candidate	Votes	%	∆%
BN	Rizalman @ Sumin Abdullah @ Sumbing	11,179	59.73	▲59.73
PBS	Raden Malleh	7,537	40.27	▼17.98
Total valid votes		18,716	100.00	
Total rejected ballots		216		
Unreturned ballots		8		
Turnout		18,940	68.93	▼1.69
Registered electors		27,477		
Majority		3,642	19.46	▲2.34
BN gain from PBS		Swing		?

Malaysian general election, 1995
Party	Candidate	Votes	%
PBS	Raden Malleh	9,949	58.25
BN	Limun Laikim	7,025	41.13
Independent	Agum @ Edward Laap	105	0.61
Total valid votes		17,079	100.00
Total rejected ballots		176	
Unreturned ballots		7	
Turnout		17,262	70.62
Registered electors		24,445	
Majority		2,924	17.12
This was a new constituency created.
