= Hendrus Anding =

Malaysian politician (born 1971)

Yang Berhormat Datuk Hendrus Anding PGDK AMN JP MLA

State Assistant Minister of Agriculture, Fisheries and Food Industries of Sabah
- Incumbent
- Assumed office 8 October 2020 (lapse on 30 November 2025 – 1 December 2025) Serving with: James Ratib (2020–2023) &; Peto Galim (2023–2025) &; Ruslan Muharam (since 2025)
- Minister: Jeffrey Kitingan (2020–2025); Jamawi Ja'afar (since 2025)
- Governor: Juhar Mahiruddin (2020–2024); Musa Aman (since 2025)
- Chief Minister: Hajiji Noor
- Preceded by: Daud Yusof (as State Assistant Minister of Agriculture and Fisheries of Sabah)
- Constituency: Tandek

Member of the Sabah State Legislative Assembly for Tandek
- Incumbent
- Assumed office 26 September 2020
- Preceded by: Anita Baranting (BN–PBS)
- Majority: 1,432 (2020); 3,026 (2025)

Vice President of the United Sabah Party (Non-Muslim Bumiputera)
- Incumbent
- Assumed office 1 July 2022 Serving with: Johnny Mositun (Non-Muslim Bumiputera) (2022–2026) &; Jonnybone J Kurum (Non-Muslim Bumiputera) (since 2026) &; Ruslan Muharam (Muslim Bumiputera) (2022–2026) &; Mursid Mohd Rais (Muslim Bumiputera) &; Sahrol Mahoolop (Muslim Bumiputera) (since 2026) &; Arthur Sen Siong Choo (Chinese)
- President: Maximus Ongkili (2022–2024); Joachim Gunsalam (since 2024)

Assistant Secretary-General of the United Sabah Party
- In office 4 January 2021 – 30 June 2022
- President: Maximus Ongkili
- Secretary-General: Joniston Bangkuai
- Preceded by: Julita Mojungki
- Succeeded by: Jonnybone J Kurum

Personal details
- Born: Hendrus Anding; 11 July 1971 (age 55) Kota Marudu, Sabah, Malaysia
- Citizenship: Malaysia
- Party: United Sabah Party (PBS)
- Other political affiliations: Gabungan Rakyat Sabah (GRS)
- Occupation: Politician
- Hendrus Anding on Facebook

Hendrus Anding (born 11 July 1971) is a Malaysian politician who has served as State Assistant Minister of Agriculture, Fisheries and Food Industries of Sabah in the Gabungan Rakyat Sabah (GRS) state administration under Chief Minister Hajiji Noor and Minister Jamawi Ja'afar since December 2025, Minister Jeffrey Kitingan from October 2020 to November 2025, as well as Member of the Sabah State Legislative Assembly (MLA) for Tandek since September 2020. He is a member of the United Sabah Party (PBS), a component party of the Gabungan Rakyat Sabah (GRS) coalition. He served as the Assistant Secretary-General of PBS from January 2021 until June 2022 and currently serves as one of the Vice Presidents for the Non-Muslim Bumiputera quota.

== Election results ==
Sabah State Legislative Assembly
| Year | Constituency | Candidate | Votes | Pct | Opponent(s) | Votes | Pct | Ballots cast | Majority | Turnout |
|---|---|---|---|---|---|---|---|---|---|---|
| 2020 | N07 Tandek | Hendrus Anding (PBS) | 3,796 | 36.87% | Anita Baranting (IND) | 2,364 | 22.95% | 7,443 | 1,432 | 63.55% |
| 2020 | N07 Tandek | Hendrus Anding (PBS) | 3,796 | 36.87% | Padis Majingkin (UPKO) | 1,986 | 19.29% | 7,443 | 1,432 | 63.55% |
| 2020 | N07 Tandek | Hendrus Anding (PBS) | 3,796 | 36.87% | Yillson Yanggun (PBRS) | 1,520 | 14.76% | 7,443 | 1,432 | 63.55% |
| 2020 | N07 Tandek | Hendrus Anding (PBS) | 3,796 | 36.87% | Andy Villson (PCS) | 395 | 3.84% | 7,443 | 1,432 | 63.55% |
| 2020 | N07 Tandek | Hendrus Anding (PBS) | 3,796 | 36.87% | Danny Leinsin Limpakan (LDP) | 236 | 2.29% | 7,443 | 1,432 | 63.55% |
| 2025 | N07 Tandek | Hendrus Anding (PBS) | 7,554 | 43.14% | Arlinsia Agang (STAR) | 4,528 | 25.86% | 17,511 | 3,026 | 61.07% |
| 2025 | N07 Tandek | Hendrus Anding (PBS) | 7,554 | 43.14% | Benson Tuyundo (KDM) | 2,893 | 16.52% | 17,511 | 3,026 | 61.07% |
| 2025 | N07 Tandek | Hendrus Anding (PBS) | 7,554 | 43.14% | Jilid @ Zainuddin Kuminding (WARISAN) | 1,674 | 9.56% | 17,511 | 3,026 | 61.07% |
| 2025 | N07 Tandek | Hendrus Anding (PBS) | 7,554 | 43.14% | Jamil Majingkin (UPKO) | 417 | 2.38% | 17,511 | 3,026 | 61.07% |
| 2025 | N07 Tandek | Hendrus Anding (PBS) | 7,554 | 43.14% | Abel Pangair (IMPIAN) | 235 | 1.34% | 17,511 | 3,026 | 61.07% |
| 2025 | N07 Tandek | Hendrus Anding (PBS) | 7,554 | 43.14% | Zaman Bayang (PKS) | 132 | 0.75% | 17,511 | 3,026 | 61.07% |
| 2025 | N07 Tandek | Hendrus Anding (PBS) | 7,554 | 43.14% | James Gantukok (PBK) | 78 | 0.45% | 17,511 | 3,026 | 61.07% |

== Honours ==
- Malaysia
  - Member of the Order of the Defender of the Realm (AMN) (2017)
- Sabah
  - Commander of the Order of Kinabalu (PGDK) – Datuk (2023)
  - Justice of the Peace (JP) (2021)
