= Rubin Balang =

Malaysian politician

Yang Berhormat Datuk Rubin Balang PGDK JP MLA

State Minister of Rural Development of Sabah
- Incumbent
- Assumed office 1 December 2025
- Governor: Musa Aman
- Chief Minister: Hajiji Noor
- Assistants: Samad Jambri &; Juil Nuatim
- Preceded by: Jahid Jahim
- Constituency: Kemabong

Past Ministerial Roles (Sabah)
- 1994–1996: Assistant Minister to the Chief Minister
- 1996–1998: Assistant Minister of Infrastructure Development
- 1998–2001: Minister of Culture, Youth and Sports

Member of the Sabah State Legislative Assembly for Kemabong
- Incumbent
- Assumed office 26 September 2020
- Preceded by: Jamawi Ja'afar (BN–UMNO)
- Majority: 1,012 (2020); 2,129 (2025)
- In office 18 February 1994 – 10 May 2018
- Preceded by: Esar Andamas (PBS)
- Succeeded by: Jamawi Ja'afar (BN–UMNO)
- Majority: 1,150 (1994); 836 (1999); 2,511 (2004); 2,437 (2008); 3,032 (2013)

Vice President of Parti Gagasan Rakyat Sabah
- Incumbent
- Assumed office 5 February 2023 Serving with Mohd Arifin Mohd Arif & Masiung Banah
- President: Hajiji Noor

Division Chairman of N43 Kemabong Branch of Parti Gagasan Rakyat Sabah
- Incumbent
- Assumed office 2023
- President: Hajiji Noor

Faction represented in the Sabah State Legislative Assembly
- 1994: Parti Bersatu Sabah
- 1994–2018: Barisan Nasional
- 2020: Independent
- 2020–2022: Perikatan Nasional
- Since 2022: Gabungan Rakyat Sabah

Personal details
- Born: Rubin bin Balang; March 1, 1963 (age 63) Kemabong village, Tenom, Crown Colony of North Borneo (now Sabah, Malaysia)
- Party: United Sabah Party (PBS) (until 1994); United Malays National Organisation of Sabah (Sabah UMNO) (1994–2018); Malaysian United Indigenous Party of Sabah (Sabah BERSATU) (2020–2022); Parti Gagasan Rakyat Sabah (GAGASAN) (since 2023)
- Other political affiliations: Barisan Nasional (BN) (1994–2018); Pakatan Harapan (PH) (2019–2020); Perikatan Nasional (PN) (2020–2022); Gabungan Rakyat Sabah (GRS) (since 2020)
- Children: Riduan Rubin
- Occupation: Politician

Rubin bin Balang (born 1 March 1963) is a Malaysian politician who has served the State Minister of Rural Development of Sabah since December 2025 in the Gabungan Rakyat Sabah (GRS) state administration under Chief Minister Hajiji Noor, as well as Member of the Sabah State Legislative Assembly (MLA) for Kemabong from February 1994 to May 2018 and again since September 2020. He is a member and one of the Vice Presidents of Parti Gagasan Rakyat Sabah (GAGASAN), a component party of the Gabungan Rakyat Sabah (GRS) coalition. He is also the father of Riduan Rubin, the Independent Member of Parliament (MP) for Tenom.

== Election results ==
Parliament of Malaysia
Year	Constituency	Candidate	Votes	Pct	Opponent(s)	Votes	Pct	Ballots cast	Majority	Turnout
2018	P181 Tenom	Rubin Balang (Sabah UMNO)	10,230	46.00%	Noorita Sual (DAP)	11,363	51.10%	22,899	1,133	78.91%
2018	P181 Tenom	Rubin Balang (Sabah UMNO)	10,230	46.00%	Laimoi Laikim (PHRS)	645	2.90%	22,899	1,133	78.91%

Sabah State Legislative Assembly
Year	Constituency	Candidate	Votes	Pct	Opponent(s)	Votes	Pct	Ballots cast	Majority	Turnout
1994	N40 Kemabong	Rubin Balang (PBS)	3,521	59.22%	Bobbey Ah Fang Suan (PDS)	2,371	39.87%	6,018	1,150	81.70%
1994	N40 Kemabong	Rubin Balang (PBS)	3,521	59.22%	Lim Antuka (BERSEKUTU)	54	0.91%	6,018	1,150	81.70%
1999	N31 Kemabong	Rubin Balang (Sabah UMNO)	4,741	53.15%	Esar Andamas (PBS)	3,905	43.78%	8,991	836	80.71%
1999	N31 Kemabong	Rubin Balang (Sabah UMNO)	4,741	53.15%	David Jani (BERSEKUTU)	274	3.07%	8,991	836	80.71%
2004	N36 Kemabong	Rubin Balang (Sabah UMNO)	4,027	54.84%	Peter Lunuk (IND)	1,516	20.65%	7,666	2,511	73.72%
2004	N36 Kemabong	Rubin Balang (Sabah UMNO)	4,027	54.84%	Limun Laikim (IND)	1,319	17.96%	7,666	2,511	73.72%
2004	N36 Kemabong	Rubin Balang (Sabah UMNO)	4,027	54.84%	Mutang Dawat (IND)	446	6.07%	7,666	2,511	73.72%
2004	N36 Kemabong	Rubin Balang (Sabah UMNO)	4,027	54.84%	Sim N.C. Rikin (IND)	35	0.48%	7,666	2,511	73.72%
2008	N36 Kemabong	Rubin Balang (Sabah UMNO)	5,158	62.78%	Peter Lunuk (PKR)	2,721	33.12%	8,442	2,437	79.66%
2008	N36 Kemabong	Rubin Balang (Sabah UMNO)	5,158	62.78%	Auren Tegko (BERSEKUTU)	337	4.10%	8,442	2,437	79.66%
2013	N36 Kemabong	Rubin Balang (Sabah UMNO)	5,765	53.88%	Biou Suyan (PKR)	2,733	25.54%	11,104	3,032	84.00%
2013	N36 Kemabong	Rubin Balang (Sabah UMNO)	5,765	53.88%	Alfred Tan Jin Kiong (STAR)	1,155	10.79%	11,104	3,032	84.00%
2013	N36 Kemabong	Rubin Balang (Sabah UMNO)	5,765	53.88%	William Ensor Tingkalor (SAPP)	1,047	9.79%	11,104	3,032	84.00%
2020	N43 Kemabong	Rubin Balang (IND)	4,214	38.48%	Lucas Umbul (UPKO)	3,202	29.23%	10,952	1,012	72.60%
2020	N43 Kemabong	Rubin Balang (IND)	4,214	38.48%	Raime Unggi (Sabah UMNO)	2,966	27.08%	10,952	1,012	72.60%
2020	N43 Kemabong	Rubin Balang (IND)	4,214	38.48%	Juster Peter (LDP)	268	2.45%	10,952	1,012	72.60%
2020	N43 Kemabong	Rubin Balang (IND)	4,214	38.48%	Alfred Tay Jin Kiong (PCS)	229	2.09%	10,952	1,012	72.60%
2020	N43 Kemabong	Rubin Balang (IND)	4,214	38.48%	Rainus Sagulau (USNO Baru)	73	0.67%	10,952	1,012	72.60%
2025	N43 Kemabong	Rubin Balang (GAGASAN)	6,326	39.77%	Noorita Sual (DAP)	4,197	26.38%	16,184	2,129	69.95%
2025	N43 Kemabong	Rubin Balang (GAGASAN)	6,326	39.77%	Rahmah Jan Sulaiman (Sabah UMNO)	2,877	18.09%	16,184	2,129	69.95%
2025	N43 Kemabong	Rubin Balang (GAGASAN)	6,326	39.77%	Burnley Balang (WARISAN)	1,317	8.28%	16,184	2,129	69.95%
2025	N43 Kemabong	Rubin Balang (GAGASAN)	6,326	39.77%	Yabri Onos (KDM)	720	4.53%	16,184	2,129	69.95%
2025	N43 Kemabong	Rubin Balang (GAGASAN)	6,326	39.77%	Hasmin Azroy Abdullah (STAR)	232	1.46%	16,184	2,129	69.95%
2025	N43 Kemabong	Rubin Balang (GAGASAN)	6,326	39.77%	Jasini Angkiwan (IMPIAN)	103	0.65%	16,184	2,129	69.95%
2025	N43 Kemabong	Rubin Balang (GAGASAN)	6,326	39.77%	Petrus Yahya (IND)	103	0.65%	16,184	2,129	69.95%
2025	N43 Kemabong	Rubin Balang (GAGASAN)	6,326	39.77%	Rassedi Liaron (PPRS)	33	0.21%	16,184	2,129	69.95%

== Honours ==
- Sabah
  - Justice of the Peace (JP) (2017)
  - Commander of the Order of Kinabalu (PGDK) – Datuk (1996)
  - Companion of the Order of Kinabalu (ASDK) (1994)
