= Noorita Sual =

Malaysian politician

Yang Berhormat Senator Puan Noorita Sual ASDK

Senator Appointed by the Yang di-Pertuan Agong
- Incumbent
- Assumed office 20 March 2023
- Monarchs: Abdullah (2023–2024); Ibrahim (since 2024)
- Prime Minister: Anwar Ibrahim

Member of the Malaysian Parliament for Tenom
- In office 9 May 2018 – 19 November 2022
- Preceded by: Raime Unggi (BN–UMNO)
- Succeeded by: Riduan Rubin (IND)
- Majority: 1,133 (2018)

State Vice Chairwoman of the Democratic Action Party of Sabah
- Incumbent
- Assumed office 2021 Serving with Tsen Nyuk Kee (2021–2024); Jannie Lasimbang (since 2024)
- Secretary-General: Anthony Loke Siew Fook
- State Chairman: Frankie Poon Ming Fung (2021–2024); Phoong Jin Zhe (since 2024)

Faction represented in Dewan Negara
- 2023–: Pakatan Harapan

Faction represented in Dewan Rakyat
- 2018–2022: Pakatan Harapan

Personal details
- Born: Noorita binti Sual; 28 April 1980 (age 45) Tenom, Sabah, Malaysia
- Citizenship: Malaysia
- Party: Democratic Action Party (DAP)
- Other political affiliations: Pakatan Harapan (PH)
- Occupation: Politician
- Profession: Lawyer

Noorita binti Sual (born 28 April 1980) is a Malaysian politician and lawyer who has served as a Senator since March 2023. She served as the Member of Parliament (MP) for Tenom from May 2018 to November 2022. She is a member and State Vice Chairwoman of Sabah of the Democratic Action Party (DAP), a component party of the Pakatan Harapan (PH) coalition. She is the first Murut female lawyer in Malaysian history.

== Political career ==
=== Candidate of Member of the Sabah State Legislative Assembly (2013) ===
In the 2013 Sabah state election, Noorita made her electoral debut after being nominated by Pakatan Rakyat (PR) to contest for the Melalap state seat. She lost to Radin Malleh of Barisan Nasional (BN) by a minority of 2,599 votes.

=== Member of Parliament (2018–2022) ===
In the 2018 general election, Noorita was nominated by PH to contest for the Tenom federal seat. She won the seat and was elected into Parliament as the Tenom MP after defeating Rubin Balang of BN by majority of 1,108 votes. Her victory also ended the long parliamentary service of BN of Tenom.

In the 2022 general election, Noorita was renominated by PH to defend the Tenom seat. She lost the seat after losing to Riduan Rubin, an independent candidate, member of the Social Democratic Harmony Party (KDM) and son of aforementioned Rubin by a minority of 1,108 votes.

=== Senator (since 2023) ===
On 20 March 2023, Noorita was appointed as a Senator by Yang di-Pertuan Agong, Al-Sultan Abdullah, alongside Abun Sui Anyit, Anifah Aman, Professor Dr. Awang Sariyan, Isaiah Jacob, Low Kian Chuan, Mohd Hasbie Muda, Mohd Hatta Ramli, Roderick Wong Siew Lead and Sivarraajh Chandran.

== Election results ==
Sabah State Legislative Assembly
Year	Constituency	Candidate	Votes	Pct	Opponent(s)	Votes	Pct	Ballots cast	Majority	Turnout
2013	N35 Melalap	Noorita Sual (DAP)	1,992	20.26%	Radin Malleh (PBS)	4,643	47.22%	9,832	2,599	81.43%
2013	N35 Melalap	Noorita Sual (DAP)	1,992	20.26%	Roger Stimin (SAPP)	2,044	20.79%	9,832	2,599	81.43%
2013	N35 Melalap	Noorita Sual (DAP)	1,992	20.26%	Kong Fui Seng (STAR)	924	9.40%	9,832	2,599	81.43%
2025	N43 Kemabong	Noorita Sual (DAP)			Rubin Balang (GAGASAN)					
2025	N43 Kemabong	Noorita Sual (DAP)			(WARISAN)					
2025	N43 Kemabong	Noorita Sual (DAP)			Roger Voo Ngok Sang (KDM)					
2025	N43 Kemabong	Noorita Sual (DAP)			(IMPIAN)					
2025	N43 Kemabong	Noorita Sual (DAP)			Petrus Eddy Yahya (IND)					

Parliament of Malaysia
Year	Constituency	Candidate	Votes	Pct	Opponent(s)	Votes	Pct	Ballots cast	Majority	Turnout
2018	P181 Tenom	Noorita Sual (DAP)	11,363	49.35%	Rubin Balang (UMNO)	10,230	44.43%	23,027	1,133	78.91%
2018	P181 Tenom	Noorita Sual (DAP)	11,363	49.35%	Laimoi @ Yuslinah Laikim (STAR)	645	2.80%	23,027	1,133	78.91%
2022	P181 Tenom	Noorita Sual (DAP)	8,919	31.13%	Riduan Rubin (IND)	10,027	35.00%	28,649	1,108	68.14%
2022	P181 Tenom	Noorita Sual (DAP)	8,919	31.13%	Jamawi Ja'afar (UMNO)	8,625	30.11%	28,649	1,108	68.14%
2022	P181 Tenom	Noorita Sual (DAP)	8,919	31.13%	Ukim Buandi (WARISAN)	992	3.46%	28,649	1,108	68.14%
2022	P181 Tenom	Noorita Sual (DAP)	8,919	31.13%	Peggy Chaw Zhi Ting (IND)	86	0.30%	28,649	1,108	68.14%

== Honours ==
- Malaysia
  - Recipient of the 17th Yang di-Pertuan Agong Installation Medal
- Sabah
  - Companion of the Order of Kinabalu (ASDK) (2018)

== See also ==
- Members of the Dewan Negara, 15th Malaysian Parliament
- List of people who have served in both Houses of the Malaysian Parliament
