= Tandek =

State constituency in Sabah, Malaysia

Tandek (N07)
Sabah constituency

State constituency
- Legislature: Sabah State Legislative Assembly
MLA
Hendrus Anding
GRS
- Constituency created: 1967
- First contested: 1967
- Last contested: 2025

Demographics
- Electors (2025): 29,244

Tandek is a state constituency in Sabah, Malaysia, that is represented in the Sabah State Legislative Assembly.

== Demographics ==
As of 2020, Tandek has a population of 30,478 people.

Ethnic breakdown of Tandek's electorate as of 2025
1. Non-Muslim Bumiputera (75.9%)
2. Muslim Bumiputera (23.0%)
3. Chinese (1.10%)
4. Other ethnicities (0.00%)

== History ==
=== Polling districts ===
According to the gazette issued on 31 October 2022, the Tandek constituency has a total of 19 polling districts.

State constituency	Polling Districts	Code	Location
Tandek（N07）	Tingkalanon	168/07/01	SMK Tandek
Tandek（N07）	Talantang	168/07/02	SK Talantang
Tandek（N07）	Ulu Bengkoka	168/07/03	Balai Raya Bombong 2
Tandek（N07）	Gana	168/07/04	Dewan Belia Gana
Tandek（N07）	Simpangan	168/07/05	SK Simpangan
Tandek（N07）	Malangkap	168/07/06	SK Melangkap
Tandek（N07）	Marak Parak	168/07/07	SK Marak-Parak
Tandek（N07）	Salimandut	168/07/08	SK Tumunda Salimandut
Tandek（N07）	Samparita	168/07/09	SK Samparita
Tandek（N07）	Lingkabungan	168/07/10	Balai Raya Lingkabungan II
Tandek（N07）	Sonsogon Magandai	168/07/11	SK Magandai
Tandek（N07）	Gouton	168/07/12	SK Gana
Tandek（N07）	Bombong I	168/07/13	Balai Raya Bombong I
Tandek（N07）	Damai	168/07/14	Dewan Belia Damai
Tandek（N07）	Tagibang	168/07/15	SK Tagibang
Tandek（N07）	Goshen	168/07/16	SMK Kota Marudu
Tandek（N07）	Timbang Batu	168/07/17	SK Timbang Batu
Tandek（N07）	Sunsui	168/07/18	Dewan Serba Guna Sunsui
Tandek（N07）	Masalog	168/07/19	SK Masalog

=== Representation history ===
Members of the Legislative Assembly for Tandek
Assembly	No	Years	Member	Party
Constituency created
3rd	N04	1967-1971	Herman Luping	UPKO
4th	N04	1971-1976	Majuning Majun	BN (USNO)
5th	N06	1976-1981	Villson Malingka	BERJAYA
6th	N06	1981–1982	Dason Suran Gaban	BN (BERJAYA)
6th	N06	1982-1985	Villson Malingka	BN (BERJAYA)
7th	N05	1985-1986	Saibul Supu	PBS
8th	N05	1986–1990	Saibul Supu	PBS
9th	N05	1990-1994	Saibul Supu	GR (PBS)
10th	N05	1994	Saibul Supu	GR (PBS)
10th	N05	1994-1999	Saibul Supu	BN (PDS)
11th	N05	1999-2002	Maximus Ongkili	PBS
11th	N05	2002–2004	Maximus Ongkili	BN (PBS)
12th	N05	2004–2008	Maximus Ongkili	BN (PBS)
13th	N05	2008–2013	Anita Baranting	BN (PBS)
14th	N05	2013–2018	Anita Baranting	BN (PBS)
15th	N05	2018	Anita Baranting	BN (PBS)
15th	N05	2018-2019	Anita Baranting	Independent
15th	N05	2019-2020	Anita Baranting	WARISAN
15th	N05	2020	Anita Baranting	Independent
16th	N07	2020-2025	Hendrus Anding	GRS (PBS)
17th	N07	2025–present	Hendrus Anding	GRS (PBS)

== Election results ==
Sabah state election, 2025: Tandek
Party	Candidate	Votes	%	∆%
GRS	Hendrus Anding	7,554	43.14	▲43.14
Homeland Solidarity Party	Arlinsia Agang	4,528	25.86	▲25.86
KDM	Benson Tuyundo	2,893	16.52	▲16.52
Heritage	Jilid Zainuddin Kuminding	1,674	9.56	▲9.56
UPKO	Jamil M Zakariah @ Majingkin	417	2.38	▼16.38
Sabah Dream Party	Abel Pangair	235	1.34	▲1.34
Sabah Nationality Party	Zaman Bayang	132	0.75	▲0.75
PBK	James Gantukok	78	0.45	▲0.45
Total valid votes		17,511		
Total rejected ballots		328		
Unreturned ballots		21		
Turnout		17,860	61.07	▼5.23
Registered electors		29,244		
Majority		3,026	17.28	▲3.76
GRS gain from PBS		Swing		?
Source(s) "RESULTS OF CONTESTED ELECTION AND STATEMENTS OF THE POLL AFTER THE OFFICIAL ADDITION OF VOTES" (PDF).

Sabah state election, 2020: Tandek
Party	Candidate	Votes	%	∆%
PBS	Hendrus Anding	3,796	35.85	▲35.85
Independent	Anita Baranting	2,364	22.33	▲22.33
UPKO	Padis Majingking	1,986	18.76	▲18.76
BN	Yillson Yanggun	1,520	14.36	▼34.96
Love Sabah Party	Andy Villson	395	3.73	▲0.66
LDP	Liensin @ Danny Leinsin Limpakan	236	2.22	▲2.22
Total valid votes		10,297	97.25	
Total rejected ballots		277	2.62	
Unreturned ballots		14	0.13	
Turnout		10,588	66.30	▼8.39
Registered electors		15,971		
Majority		1,432	13.52	▼11.99
PBS gain from BN		Swing		?
Source(s) "RESULTS OF CONTESTED ELECTION AND STATEMENTS OF THE POLL AFTER THE OFFICIAL ADDITION OF VOTES".

Sabah state election, 2018: Tandek
Party	Candidate	Votes	%	∆%
BN	Anita Baranting	8,877	49.32	▼5.27
Sabah Heritage Party	Baintin Adun	4,285	23.81	▲23.81
Homeland Solidarity Party	Joel Masilung	3,621	21.12	▲5.62
Love Sabah Party	Johnson Assan @ Johnson Gaban	553	3.07	▲3.07
Total valid votes		17,336	96.31	
Total rejected ballots		584	3.24	
Unreturned ballots		80	0.44	
Turnout		18,000	74.69	▼2.81
Registered electors		24,101		
Majority		4,592	25.51	▼5.13
BN hold		Swing		
Source(s) "RESULTS OF CONTESTED ELECTION AND STATEMENTS OF THE POLL AFTER THE OFFICIAL ADDITION OF VOTES".

Sabah state election, 2013: Tandek
Party	Candidate	Votes	%	∆%
BN	Anita Baranting	9,399	54.59	▲6.64
PKR	Andonny Pilit @ Anthony Biri Mandiau	4,124	23.95	▼4.84
STAR	Jebon Janaun	2,668	15.50	▲15.50
SAPP	Yapolai Kundapit @ Henry	380	2.21	▲2.21
Total valid votes		16,571	96.24	
Total rejected ballots		599	3.48	
Unreturned ballots		47	0.27	
Turnout		17,217	77.50	▲6.91
Registered electors		22,220		
Majority		5,275	30.64	▲11.48
BN hold		Swing		
Source(s) "KEPUTUSAN PILIHAN RAYA UMUM DEWAN UNDANGAN NEGERI".

Sabah state election, 2008: Tandek
Party	Candidate	Votes	%	∆%
BN	Anita Baranting	5,598	47.95	▼3.56
PKR	Jurin Gunsalam @ Saidina Ali	3,361	28.79	▲22.77
Independent	Andy Vilison	1,678	14.37	▲14.37
BERSEKUTU	Masingkan @ Shingkan Masampun	202	1.73	▲1.73
Independent	Isang Rawai	112	0.96	▲0.96
Total valid votes		10,951	93.80	
Total rejected ballots		364	3.18	
Unreturned ballots		360	3.08	
Turnout		11,675	70.59	▲2.81
Registered electors		16,538		
Majority		2,237	19.16	▼8.41
BN hold		Swing		
Source(s) "KEPUTUSAN PILIHAN RAYA UMUM DEWAN UNDANGAN NEGERI SABAH BAGI TAHUN 2008".

Sabah state election, 2004: Tandek
Party	Candidate	Votes	%	∆%
BN	Maximus Ongkili	5,069	51.51	▲10.23
Independent	Johe @ George Sangkin	2,356	23.94	▲23.94
Independent	Andonny Pilit @ Anthony Biri Mandiau	692	7.03	▲7.03
Independent	Ungas @ Shahnuar Bodok	685	6.96	▲6.96
PKR	Abdul Kahar Abdul Rahman	592	6.02	▲6.02
Total valid votes		9,394	95.47	
Total rejected ballots		446	4.53	
Unreturned ballots		0	0.00	
Turnout		9,840	67.78	▼9.31
Registered electors		14,517		
Majority		2,713	27.57	▲15.79
BN gain from PBS		Swing		?
Source(s) "KEPUTUSAN PILIHAN RAYA UMUM DEWAN UNDANGAN NEGERI SABAH BAGI TAHUN 2004".

Sabah state election, 1999: Tandek
Party	Candidate	Votes	%	∆%
PBS	Maximus Ongkili	5,671	53.06	▼1.77
BN	Saibul Supu	4,412	41.28	▼0.96
BERSEKUTU	Joe Santi	463	4.33	▲4.33
Total valid votes		10,546	98.67	
Total rejected ballots		131	1.23	
Unreturned ballots		11	0.10	
Turnout		10,688	77.09	▲0.04
Registered electors		13,864		
Majority		1,259	11.78	▼0.81
PBS hold		Swing		
Source(s) "KEPUTUSAN PILIHAN RAYA UMUM DEWAN UNDANGAN NEGERI SABAH BAGI TAHUN 1999".

Sabah state election, 1994: Tandek
Party	Candidate	Votes	%	∆%
PBS	Saibul Supu	2,931	54.83	▲5.64
BN	Saidi Suari @ Ramli	2,258	42.24	▲42.24
Independent	Baintin Adun	77	1.44	▲1.44
Total valid votes		5,266	98.50	
Total rejected ballots		80	1.50	
Unreturned ballots		0	0.00	
Turnout		5,346	77.05	▲2.48
Registered electors		6,938		
Majority		673	12.59	▼10.22
PBS hold		Swing		
Source(s) "KEPUTUSAN PILIHAN RAYA UMUM DEWAN UNDANGAN NEGERI SABAH BAGI TAHUN 1994".

Sabah state election, 1990: Tandek
Party	Candidate	Votes	%	∆%
PBS	Saibul Supu	2,449	49.19	▼3.03
USNO	Saidi Suari	1,313	26.38	▼4.17
PRS	Herowan V Malingka	372	7.47	▲7.47
AKAR	Saibon Papalan	354	7.11	▲7.11
BERJAYA	Dason Gaban	271	5.44	▼0.71
Total valid votes		4,759	95.60	
Total rejected ballots		219	4.40	
Unreturned ballots		0	0.00	
Turnout		4,978	74.57	▲6.15
Registered electors		6,676		
Majority		1,136	22.81	▲1.14
PBS hold		Swing		
Source(s) "KEPUTUSAN PILIHAN RAYA UMUM DEWAN UNDANGAN NEGERI SABAH BAGI TAHUN 1990".

Sabah state election, 1986: Tandek
Party	Candidate	Votes	%	∆%
PBS	Saibul Supu	2,055	52.91	▲9.16
USNO	Saidi Suari	1,202	30.95	▲1.21
Independent	Herowan V Malingka	385	9.91	▲9.91
BERJAYA	Majawab Masantun	242	6.23	▲6.23
Total valid votes		3,884	100.00	
Total rejected ballots		51		
Unreturned ballots		0		
Turnout		3,935	68.42	▲2.89
Registered electors		5,751		
Majority		853	21.96	▲7.95
PBS hold		Swing		
Source(s) "KEPUTUSAN PILIHAN RAYA UMUM DEWAN UNDANGAN NEGERI SABAH BAGI TAHUN 1986".

Sabah state election, 1985: Tandek
Party	Candidate	Votes	%	∆%
PBS	Saibul Supu	1,480	43.75	▲43.75
USNO	Kee Abdul Jalil Abdullah	1,006	29.74	▲2.70
BERJAYA	Uhot Malingka	815	24.09	▼26.48
BERSEPADU	Jaminah Abduka	48	1.42	▲1.42
PASOK	Henry Bungas	34	1.01	▼21.38
Total valid votes		3,383	100.00	
Total rejected ballots		64		
Unreturned ballots		0		
Turnout		3,447	65.53	▼0.40
Registered electors		5,260		
Majority		474	14.01	▼9.53
PBS gain from BN		Swing		-

Sabah state election, 1981: Tandek
Party	Candidate	Votes	%	∆%
BERJAYA	Dasan Suran	1,504	50.57	▼1.42
USNO	Zulkiflie Majun	804	27.03	▼12.87
PASOK	Masingkan Masampun	666	22.39	▲22.39
Total valid votes		2,974	100.00	
Total rejected ballots		128		
Unreturned ballots		0		
Turnout		3,102	65.93	▼6.10
Registered electors		4,705		
Majority		700	23.54	▲11.45
BERJAYA hold		Swing		

Sabah state election, 1976: Tandek
Party	Candidate	Votes	%	∆%
BERJAYA	Villson Malingka	1,437	51.99	
USNO	Majuning Majun	1,103	39.91	
Independent	Baudi Unggut	159	5.75	
PEKEMAS	Albert Surubi Adun	65	2.35	
Total valid votes		2,764	100.00	
Total rejected ballots		115		
Unreturned ballots		0		
Turnout		2,879	72.03	
Registered electors		3,997		
Majority		334	12.08	
BERJAYA gain from Alliance		Swing		-

Sabah state election, 1971: Tandek
Party	Candidate	Votes	%	∆%
On the nomination day, Majuning Majun won uncontested.
USNO	Majuning Majun			
Total valid votes				
Total rejected ballots				
Unreturned ballots				
Turnout				
Registered electors		0		
Majority				
USNO hold		Swing		

Sabah state election, 1967: Tandek
Party	Candidate	Votes	%
UPKO	Herman Luping	2,207	76.18
USNO	Madina Unggut	690	23.82
Total valid votes		2,897	100.00
Total rejected ballots		27	
Unreturned ballots		0	
Turnout		2,924	86.03
Registered electors		3,399	
Majority		1,517	52.36
This was a new constituency created.
