= Yamani Hafez Musa =

Malaysian politician

Yang Berbahagia Datuk Yamani Hafez Musa PGDK ASDK BSK JP
- يماني حفيظ موسى
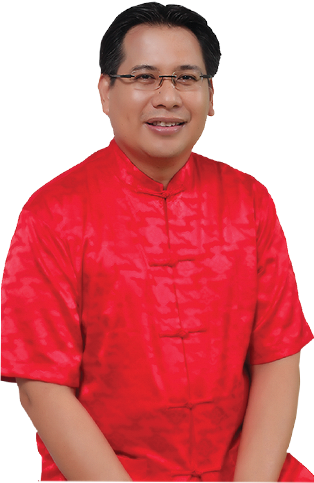

Deputy Minister of Finance II
- In office 30 August 2021 – 24 November 2022 Serving with Mohd Shahar Abdullah (Deputy Minister of Finance I)
- Monarch: Abdullah
- Prime Minister: Ismail Sabri Yaakob
- Minister: Tengku Zafrul Aziz
- Preceded by: Mohd Shahar Abdullah
- Succeeded by: Steven Sim Chee Keong
- Constituency: Sipitang

Chairman of FELCRA Berhad
- In office 29 July 2020 – 1 September 2021
- Minister: Abdul Latiff Ahmad (2020–2021); Mahdzir Khalid (2021)
- Chief Executive Officer: Mohd Nazrul Izam Mansor
- Preceded by: Shabudin Yahaya
- Succeeded by: Ahmad Jazlan Yaakub

Member of the Malaysian Parliament for Sipitang
- In office 9 May 2018 – 19 November 2022
- Preceded by: Sapawi Ahmad (BN–UMNO)
- Succeeded by: Matbali Musah (GRS)
- Majority: 852 (2018)

Faction represented in Dewan Rakyat
- 2018: Barisan Nasional
- 2018–2019: Independent
- 2019–2020: Pakatan Harapan
- 2020–2022: Malaysian United Indigenous Party
- 2020–2022: Perikatan Nasional

Personal details
- Born: Yamani Hafez bin Musa; 31 October 1977 (age 48) Sipitang, Sabah, Malaysia
- Party: United Malays National Organisation of Sabah (Sabah UMNO) (until 2018); Independent (2018–2019); Malaysian United Indigenous Party of Sabah (Sabah BERSATU) (2019–2022); Parti Gagasan Rakyat Sabah (GAGASAN) (2023–2025, since 2026); People's Justice Party (PKR) (2025–2026)
- Other political affiliations: Barisan Nasional (BN) (until 2018); Pakatan Harapan (PH) (2019–2020, 2025–2026); Perikatan Nasional (PN) (2020–2022); Gabungan Rakyat Sabah (GRS) (2023–2025, since 2026)
- Relations: Anifah Aman (uncle); Hazem Mubarak Musa (brother); Lenny Natasha Musa (sister); Arifin Arif (brother-in-law); Annuar Ayub (cousin)
- Parent(s): Musa Aman; Faridah Tussin
- Education: University of Canterbury; Universiti Teknologi MARA (MBA)
- Occupation: Politician
- Yamani Hafez Musa on Facebook

Yamani Hafez bin Musa (Jawi: يماني حفيظ بن موسى; born 31 October 1977) is a Malaysian politician who served as the Deputy Minister of Finance II in the Barisan Nasional (BN) administration under former Prime Minister Ismail Sabri Yaakob and former Minister Tengku Zafrul Aziz from August 2021 to the collapse of the BN administration in November 2022, Member of Parliament (MP) for Sipitang from May 2018 to November 2022 and Chairman of FELCRA Berhad from July 2020 to September 2021. He is a member of the Parti Gagasan Rakyat Sabah (GAGASAN), a component of the Gabungan Rakyat Sabah (GRS) coalition. He previously was a member and the State Youth Chief of the United Malays National Organisation of Sabah (Sabah UMNO), a branch of a component party of the ruling Barisan Nasional (BN), formerly a member of the Malaysian United Indigenous Party of Sabah (Sabah BERSATU), a branch of a component of the Perikatan Nasional (PN) coalition and formerly a member of the People's Justice Party (PKR), a component party of the Pakatan Harapan (PH) coalition.

On 25 January 2026, he was appointed as an ex-officio member of the Central Leadership Council of PKR alongside fellow Sabahan PKR members Jamawi Ja'afar and Ruji Ubi.

== Personal life ==
Yamani is the son of Musa Aman, the Yang di-Pertua Negeri of Sabah and former Chief Minister of Sabah. He has an undergraduate degree of commerce from the University of Canterbury, New Zealand and a master's degree in Business Administration from Universiti Teknologi MARA (UiTM).

== Elections ==
In the 2018 general election (GE14), UMNO fielded him to contest the Sipitang parliamentary seat despite his participation into politics was being opposed by his father. He subsequently won in a three-corner contest facing a new candidate Noor Hayaty Mustapha from the Sabah Heritage Party (WARISAN) and Dayang Aezzy Liman from the Sabah People's Hope Party (PHRS).

== Controversy ==
After the Barisan Nasional (BN) coalition's fall in GE14 and following the disappearance of his father Musa Aman, Yamani was not seen in public too. He finally presented at the parliament to take his oath as a Member of Parliament on 7 January 2019, nine days shy of the 16 January deadline.

== Election results ==
Parliament of Malaysia
Year	Constituency	Candidate	Votes	Pct	Opponent(s)	Votes	Pct	Ballots cast	Majority	Turnout
2018	P178 Sipitang	Yamani Hafez Musa (Sabah UMNO)	12,038	47.24%	Noor Hayaty Mustapha (WARISAN)	11,186	43.90%	25,483	852	79.93%
2018	P178 Sipitang	Yamani Hafez Musa (Sabah UMNO)	12,038	47.24%	Dayang Aezzy Liman (PHRS)	1,547	6.07%	25,483	852	79.93%

Sabah State Legislative Assembly
Year	Constituency	Candidate	Votes	Pct	Opponent(s)	Votes	Pct	Ballots cast	Majority	Turnout
2025	N35 Sindumin	Yamani Hafez Musa (PKR)	4,724	29.82%	Yusri Pungut (WARISAN)	5,086	32.10%	16,107	362	63.14%
2025	N35 Sindumin	Yamani Hafez Musa (PKR)	4,724	29.82%	Abdillah Jalaf @ Dila (IND)	2,570	16.22%	16,107	362	63.14%
2025	N35 Sindumin	Yamani Hafez Musa (PKR)	4,724	29.82%	Moktar Matussin (STAR)	1,469	9.27%	16,107	362	63.14%
2025	N35 Sindumin	Yamani Hafez Musa (PKR)	4,724	29.82%	Sani Miasin (KDM)	875	5.52%	16,107	362	63.14%
2025	N35 Sindumin	Yamani Hafez Musa (PKR)	4,724	29.82%	Dayang Noor Syafiqah Hamid (Sabah BERSATU)	705	4.45%	16,107	362	63.14%
2025	N35 Sindumin	Yamani Hafez Musa (PKR)	4,724	29.82%	Markus Buas (IMPIAN)	293	1.85%	16,107	362	63.14%
2025	N35 Sindumin	Yamani Hafez Musa (PKR)	4,724	29.82%	Wilson Liou (IND)	54	0.34%	16,107	362	63.14%
2025	N35 Sindumin	Yamani Hafez Musa (PKR)	4,724	29.82%	Kanafia Bujang (PKS)	37	0.23%	16,107	362	63.14%
2025	N35 Sindumin	Yamani Hafez Musa (PKR)	4,724	29.82%	Ibrahim Tuah (IND)	30	0.19%	16,107	362	63.14%

== Honours ==
- Sabah
  - Commander of the Order of Kinabalu (PGDK) – Datuk (2022)
  - Companion of the Order of Kinabalu (ASDK) (2015)
  - Grand Star of the Order of Kinabalu (BSK) (2009)
  - Justice of the Peace (JP) (2017)
