= Padas (federal constituency) =

Sabah constituency

Defunct federal constituency
- Legislature: Dewan Rakyat
- Constituency created: 1984
- Constituency abolished: 1995
- First contested: 1986
- Last contested: 1990

Padas was a federal constituency in Sabah, Malaysia, that was represented in the Dewan Rakyat from 1986 to 1995.

The federal constituency was created in the 1984 redistribution and was mandated to return a single member to the Dewan Rakyat under the first past the post voting system.

== History ==
It was abolished in 1995 when it was redistributed.

=== Representation history ===
Members of Parliament for Padas
Parliament	No	Years	Member	Party	Vote Share
Constituency created, renamed from Ulu Padas
7th	P149	1986-1990	Kadoh Agundong	BN (PBS)	7,014; 65.30%
8th	P149	1990-1995	Raden Malleh	GR (PBS)	9,848; 84.37%
Constituency abolished, split into Sipitang and Tenom

=== State constituency ===
Parliamentary constituency	State constituency					
Parliamentary constituency	1967–1974	1974–1985	1985–1995	1995–2004	2004–2020	2020–present
Padas			Kemabong			
Padas			Sipitang			
Padas			Tenom			

=== Historical boundaries ===
State Constituency	Area
State Constituency	1984
Kemabong	Kampung Baru Jumpa; Katubuh; Kemabong; Mansuoh; Tomani
Sipitang	Long Pasia; Melalia; Mesapol; Sindumin; Sipitang
Tenom	Melalap; Mentalik; Pamilaan; Pangi; Tenom

== Election results ==
Malaysian general election, 1990
Party	Candidate	Votes	%	∆%
PBS	Raden Malleh	9,848	84.37	▲84.37
DAP	Paul Kadau	1,824	15.63	▲15.63
Total valid votes		11,672	100.00	
Total rejected ballots		791		
Unreturned ballots		0		
Turnout		12,463	51.65	▼7.59
Registered electors		24,629		
Majority		8,024	68.74	▲38.14
PBS gain from BN		Swing		?

Malaysian general election, 1986
Party	Candidate	Votes	%
BN	Kadoh Agundong	7,014	65.30
BERJAYA	Jinuin Jimin	3,727	34.70
Total valid votes		10,741	100.00
Total rejected ballots		187	
Unreturned ballots		0	
Turnout		10,928	59.24
Registered electors		18,447	
Majority		3,287	30.60
This was a new constituency created.
