= Yusof Yacob =

Malaysian politician

Yang Berbahagia Datuk Yusof Yacob PGDK
- يوسف بن يعقوب

Chairman of Sabah Development Bank Berhad
- Incumbent
- Assumed office 13 January 2026
- Governor: Musa Aman
- Chief Minister: Hajiji Noor
- Preceded by: Frankie Poon Ming Fung

State Minister of Education and Innovation of Sabah
- In office 16 May 2018 – 29 September 2020
- Governor: Juhar Mahiruddin
- Chief Minister: Shafie Apdal
- Assistant: Mohammad Mohamarin; Jennifer Lasimbang
- Preceded by: Position established
- Succeeded by: Yakubah Khan (State Minister of Science and Innovation of Sabah)
- Constituency: Sindumin

Deputy Speaker of the Dewan Rakyat
- In office 17 May 2004 – 13 February 2008 Serving with Lim Si Cheng
- Monarchs: Sirajuddin; Mizan Zainal Abidin
- Prime Minister: Abdullah Ahmad Badawi
- Speaker: Mohamed Zahir Ismail (2004); Ramli Ngah Talib (2004–2008)
- Preceded by: Muhammad Abdullah
- Succeeded by: Ronald Kiandee
- Constituency: Sipitang

Member of the Sabah State Legislative Assembly for Sindumin
- In office 9 May 2018 – 29 November 2025
- Preceded by: Ahmad Bujang (BN–UMNO)
- Succeeded by: Yusri Pungut (WARISAN)
- Majority: 760 (2018); 424 (2020)

Member of the Malaysian Parliament for Sipitang
- In office 25 April 1995 – 8 March 2008
- Preceded by: Mustapha Harun (BN–UMNO)
- Succeeded by: Sapawi Ahmad (BN–UMNO)
- Majority: 4,524 (1995); 4,339 (1999); Walkover (2004)

Faction represented in Sabah State Legislative Assembly
- 2018–2021: Sabah Heritage Party
- 2021–2023: Independent
- 2023–: Gabungan Rakyat Sabah

Faction represented in Dewan Rakyat
- 1995–2008: Barisan Nasional

Personal details
- Born: Yusof bin Yacob; 1954 (age 71–72) Sipitang, Crown Colony of North Borneo (now Sabah, Malaysia)
- Citizenship: Malaysian
- Party: United Malays National Organisation (UMNO) (1995–2018); Heritage Party (WARISAN) (2018–2021); Independent (2021–2023); Parti Gagasan Rakyat Sabah (GAGASAN) (member since 2023)
- Other political affiliations: Barisan Nasional (BN) (1995−2018, aligned:2021–2023); Perikatan Nasional (PN) (aligned:2021–2022); Gabungan Rakyat Sabah (GRS) (member since 2023, aligned: 2021–2023)
- Spouse: Azizah Beniamen
- Occupation: Politician

Yusof bin Yacob is a Malaysian politician who has served as Chairman of Qhazanah Sabah Berhad since January 2023 and the Member of Sabah State Legislative Assembly (MLA) for Sindumin from May 2018 to December 2025. He served as State Minister of Education and Innovation of Sabah in the Heritage Party (WARISAN) state administration under former chief minister Shafie Apdal from May 2018 to the collapse of the WARISAN administration in September 2020, Deputy Speaker of the Dewan Rakyat from May 2004 to December 2007 and member of parliament (MP) for Sipitang from April 1995 to March 2008. He is a member of the Parti Gagasan Rakyat Sabah (GAGASAN), a component party of the Gabungan Rakyat Sabah (GRS) coalition. He was a member of the WARISAN, before leaving the party on 8 October 2021 to become an independent in support of the ruling GRS coalition. He was also member of the United Malays National Organisation (UMNO), a component party of the Barisan Nasional (BN) which he left in 2018. On 22 May 2022, he confirmed that he had applied to rejoin and was pending return to BN and UMNO after leaving them four years ago. However, his application was not accepted before he withdrew the application and joined GAGASAN instead on 21 January 2023.

== Election results ==
Parliament of Malaysia
Year	Constituency	Candidate	Votes	Pct	Opponent(s)	Votes	Pct	Ballots cast	Majority	Turnout
1995	P155 Sipitang	Yusof Yacob (UMNO)	9,732	64.44%	Jamilah Sulaiman (PBS)	5,208	34.49%	15,324	4,524	74.36%
1995	P155 Sipitang	Yusof Yacob (UMNO)	9,732	64.44%	Hussin Masalih (IND)	162	1.07%	15,324	4,524	74.36%
1999	P155 Sipitang	Yusof Yacob (UMNO)	9,581	64.01%	Abdul Rahman Md. Yakub (keADILan)	5,242	35.02%	15,181	4,339	68.74%
1999	P155 Sipitang	Yusof Yacob (UMNO)	9,581	64.01%	Ag. Ku Tengah Pg. Damit (IND)	145	0.97%	15,181	4,339	68.74%
2004	P178 Sipitang	Yusof Yacob (UMNO)	Unopposed							

Sabah State Legislative Assembly
Year	Constituency	Candidate	Votes	Pct	Opponent(s)	Votes	Pct	Ballots cast	Majority	Turnout
1990	N38 Sipitang	Yusof Yacob (USNO)	2,161	34.38%	Jawawi Isa (PBS)	2,437	38.77%	6,361	276	82.17%
1990	N38 Sipitang	Yusof Yacob (USNO)	2,161	34.38%	Harris Mohd. Salleh (BERJAYA)	969	15.42%	6,361	276	82.17%
1990	N38 Sipitang	Yusof Yacob (USNO)	2,161	34.38%	Othman Mohd. Yassin (IND)	597	9.50%	6,361	276	82.17%
1990	N38 Sipitang	Yusof Yacob (USNO)	2,161	34.38%	Pius Ganang (AKAR)	86	1.37%	6,361	276	82.17%
1990	N38 Sipitang	Yusof Yacob (USNO)	2,161	34.38%	Ramlah Rammelan (PRS)	35	0.56%	6,361	276	82.17%
2018	N28 Sindumin	Yusof Yacob (WARISAN)	6,648	51.90%	Sapawi Amat Wasali (UMNO)	5,888	45.97%	13,065	760	77.40%
2018	N28 Sindumin	Yusof Yacob (WARISAN)	6,648	51.90%	Patrick Sadom (PHRS)	273	2.13%	13,065	760	77.40%
2020	N35 Sindumin	Yusof Yacob (WARISAN)	5,415	48.96%	Sani Miasin (UMNO)	4,991	45.12%	11,061	424	65.99%
2020	N35 Sindumin	Yusof Yacob (WARISAN)	5,415	48.96%	Manshur Okk Mohd Yassin (USNO Baru)	365	3.30%	11,061	424	65.99%
2020	N35 Sindumin	Yusof Yacob (WARISAN)	5,415	48.96%	Daniel Gaing (LDP)	142	1.28%	11,061	424	65.99%
2020	N35 Sindumin	Yusof Yacob (WARISAN)	5,415	48.96%	Jaebeh Buaya (PCS)	114	1.03%	11,061	424	65.99%
2020	N35 Sindumin	Yusof Yacob (WARISAN)	5,415	48.96%	Arifin Harith (GAGASAN)	34	0.31%	11,061	424	65.99%

== Honours ==
- Sabah
  - Commander of the Order of Kinabalu (PGDK) – Datuk (1997)
