= Kamarlin Ombi =

Malaysian politician

Yang Berbahagia Datuk Kamarlin Ombi PGDK
- قمرلين أومبي

Sabah State Assistant Minister of Tourism, Culture and Environment
- In office 10 May 2013 – 10 May 2018 Serving with Pang Yuk Ming
- Governor: Juhar Mahiruddin
- Chief Minister: Musa Aman
- Minister: Masidi Manjun
- Preceded by: Bolkiah Ismail
- Succeeded by: Assaffal P. Alian
- Constituency: Lumadan

Member of the Sabah State Legislative Assembly for Lumadan
- In office 8 March 2008 – 9 May 2018
- Preceded by: Surinam Sadikun (BN–UMNO)
- Succeeded by: Matbali Musah (BN-UMNO)
- Majority: 3,297 (2008); 3,862 (2013)

Personal details
- Born: Kamarlin bin Ombi Beaufort, Crown Colony of North Borneo (now Sabah, Malaysia)
- Citizenship: Malaysia
- Party: United Malays National Organisation of Sabah (Sabah UMNO)
- Other political affiliations: Barisan Nasional (BN)
- Spouse: Saridah Abdullah
- Children: Mohd Asyraf; Nor Alyaa Asyiqien; Nor Elyna Aqilah; Mohd Asyrie; Mohd Asyhar; Nur Elyanie Afiqah
- Occupation: Politician
- Profession: Schoolteacher (retired)

Kamarlin bin Ombi is a Malaysian politician who had served as an Assistant Minister under Chief Minister Musa Aman's administration from 2013 until 2018 and Member of Sabah State Legislative Assembly (MLA) for Lumadan from March 2008 until May 2018. He is a member of the United Malays National Organisation of Sabah (Sabah UMNO) a branch of a component party of the Barisan Nasional (BN) coalition.

== Election results ==
Sabah State Legislative Assembly
Year	Constituency	Candidate	Votes	Pct	Opponent(s)	Votes	Pct	Ballots cast	Majority	Turnout
2008	N27 Lumadan	Kamarlin Ombi (UMNO)	5,707	69.39%	Dojit Muda (PKR)	2,410	29.31%	8,500	3,297	75.15%
2008	N27 Lumadan	Kamarlin Ombi (UMNO)	5,707	69.39%	Brahim Awang Anak (IND)	107	1.30%	8,500	3,297	75.15%
2013	N27 Lumadan	Kamarlin Ombi (UMNO)	6,338	55.23%	Rapahi Edris (IND)	2,476	21.57%	11,722	3,862	85.50%
2013	N27 Lumadan	Kamarlin Ombi (UMNO)	6,338	55.23%	Abdul Rahman Md Yakub (PKR)	2,303	20.07%	11,722	3,862	85.50%
2013	N27 Lumadan	Kamarlin Ombi (UMNO)	6,338	55.23%	Mohd Jaafar Ibrahim (STAR)	147	1.28%	11,722	3,862	85.50%
2013	N27 Lumadan	Kamarlin Ombi (UMNO)	6,338	55.23%	Jamain Sarudin (SAPP)	143	1.25%	11,722	3,862	85.50%
2013	N27 Lumadan	Kamarlin Ombi (UMNO)	6,338	55.23%	Saudi Suhaili (IND)	69	0.60%	11,722	3,862	85.50%
2020	N34 Lumadan	Kamarlin Ombi (UMNO)	3,286	31.11%	Ruslan Muharam (PBS)	3,650	34.55%	10,564	364	63.55%
2020	N34 Lumadan	Kamarlin Ombi (UMNO)	3,286	31.11%	Ag. Ku Zaidi Pg. Wahab (WARISAN)	2,859	27.05%	10,564	364	63.55%
2020	N34 Lumadan	Kamarlin Ombi (UMNO)	3,286	31.11%	Ali Dad Fazal Elahi (USNO Baru)	254	2.40%	10,564	364	63.55%
2020	N34 Lumadan	Kamarlin Ombi (UMNO)	3,286	31.11%	Malik Unsat (PCS)	231	2.19%	10,564	364	63.55%
2020	N34 Lumadan	Kamarlin Ombi (UMNO)	3,286	31.11%	Johari Mohd Dun (PPRS)	135	1.28%	10,564	364	63.55%
2020	N34 Lumadan	Kamarlin Ombi (UMNO)	3,286	31.11%	Dayang Aezzy Liman (PHRS)	59	0.56%	10,564	364	63.55%
2020	N34 Lumadan	Kamarlin Ombi (UMNO)	3,286	31.11%	Mohd Saidi Manan (IND)	46	0.44%	10,564	364	63.55%
2020	N34 Lumadan	Kamarlin Ombi (UMNO)	3,286	31.11%	Sahlih Sirin (GAGASAN)	44	0.42%	10,564	364	63.55%

== Honours ==
- Sabah
  - Commander of the Order of Kinabalu (PGDK) – Datuk (2012)
  - Member of the Order of Kinabalu (ADK) (2001)
