= Matbali Musah =

Malaysian politician

Yang Berhormat Datuk Matbali Musah PGDK MP
- متبلي موسى

Member of the Malaysian Parliament for Sipitang
- Incumbent
- Assumed office 19 November 2022
- Preceded by: Yamani Hafez Musa (BN–UMNO)
- Majority: 4,691 (2022)

Member of the Sabah State Legislative Assembly for Lumadan
- In office 9 May 2018 – 26 September 2020
- Preceded by: Kamarlin Ombi (BN–UMNO)
- Succeeded by: Ruslan Muharam (GRS–PBS)
- Majority: 2,935 (2018)

Personal details
- Born: Matbali bin Haji Musah; 1 August 1969 (age 56) Beaufort, Sabah, Malaysia
- Citizenship: Malaysian
- Party: United Malays National Organisation of Sabah (Sabah UMNO) (–2019); Malaysian United Indigenous Party of Sabah (Sabah BERSATU) (2019–2022)
- Other political affiliations: Barisan Nasional (BN) (–2019); Pakatan Harapan (PH) (2019–2020); Perikatan Nasional (PN) (2020–2022); Gabungan Rakyat Sabah (GRS) (since 2020)
- Parent: Musah Kasamah (father)
- Occupation: Politician

Matbali Musah is a Malaysian politician who has served as the Member of Parliament (MP) for Sipitang since November 2022. He served as Member of the Sabah State Legislative Assembly (MLA) for Lumadan from May 2018 to September 2020. He is a direct member of the Gabungan Rakyat Sabah (GRS) and was a member and the Division Chief of Sipitang of the Malaysian United Indigenous Party of Sabah (Sabah BERSATU), a component party of the GRS coalition and branch of the component party of the Perikatan Nasional (PN) coalition and was a member and Division Deputy Chief of Sipitang of the United Malays National Organisation of Sabah (Sabah UMNO), a branch of the component party of the Barisan Nasional (BN) coalition. He is an ethnic Bisayan, a sub-ethnic group or tribe of the indigenous Kadazan-Dusun population native to Beaufort and Kuala Penyu districts located in the southern part of Sabah.

== Election results ==
Sabah State Legislative Assembly
| Year | Constituency | Candidate | Votes | Pct | Opponent(s) | Votes | Pct | Ballots cast | Majority | Turnout |
|---|---|---|---|---|---|---|---|---|---|---|
| 2018 | N34 Lumadan | Matbali Musah (UMNO) | 6,836 | 55.04% | Mohd Samlih Juaisin (WARISAN) | 3,901 | 31.41% | 12,420 | 2,935 | 84.93% |
| 2018 | N34 Lumadan | Matbali Musah (UMNO) | 6,836 | 55.04% | Asmat Japar (PHRS) | 1,331 | 10.72% | 12,420 | 2,935 | 84.93% |

Parliament of Malaysia
| Year | Constituency | Candidate | Votes | Pct | Opponent(s) | Votes | Pct | Ballots cast | Majority | Turnout |
|---|---|---|---|---|---|---|---|---|---|---|
| 2022 | P178 Sipitang | Matbali Musah (Sabah BERSATU) | 14,459 | 49.75% | Adnan Puteh (WARISAN) | 9,768 | 33.61% | 29,061 | 4,691 | 63.35% |
| 2022 | P178 Sipitang | Matbali Musah (Sabah BERSATU) | 14,459 | 49.75% | Lahirul Latigul (AMANAH) | 4,834 | 16.63% | 29,061 | 4,691 | 63.35% |

== Honours ==
- Sabah
  - Commander of the Order of Kinabalu (PGDK) – Datuk (2020)
  - Member of the Order of Kinabalu (ADK) (2012)
  - Grand Star of the Order of Kinabalu (BSK) (2010)
