= Sapawi Ahmad =

Malaysian politician

Yang Berbahagia Datuk Sapawi Ahmad PGDK JP
- صڤاوي أحمد
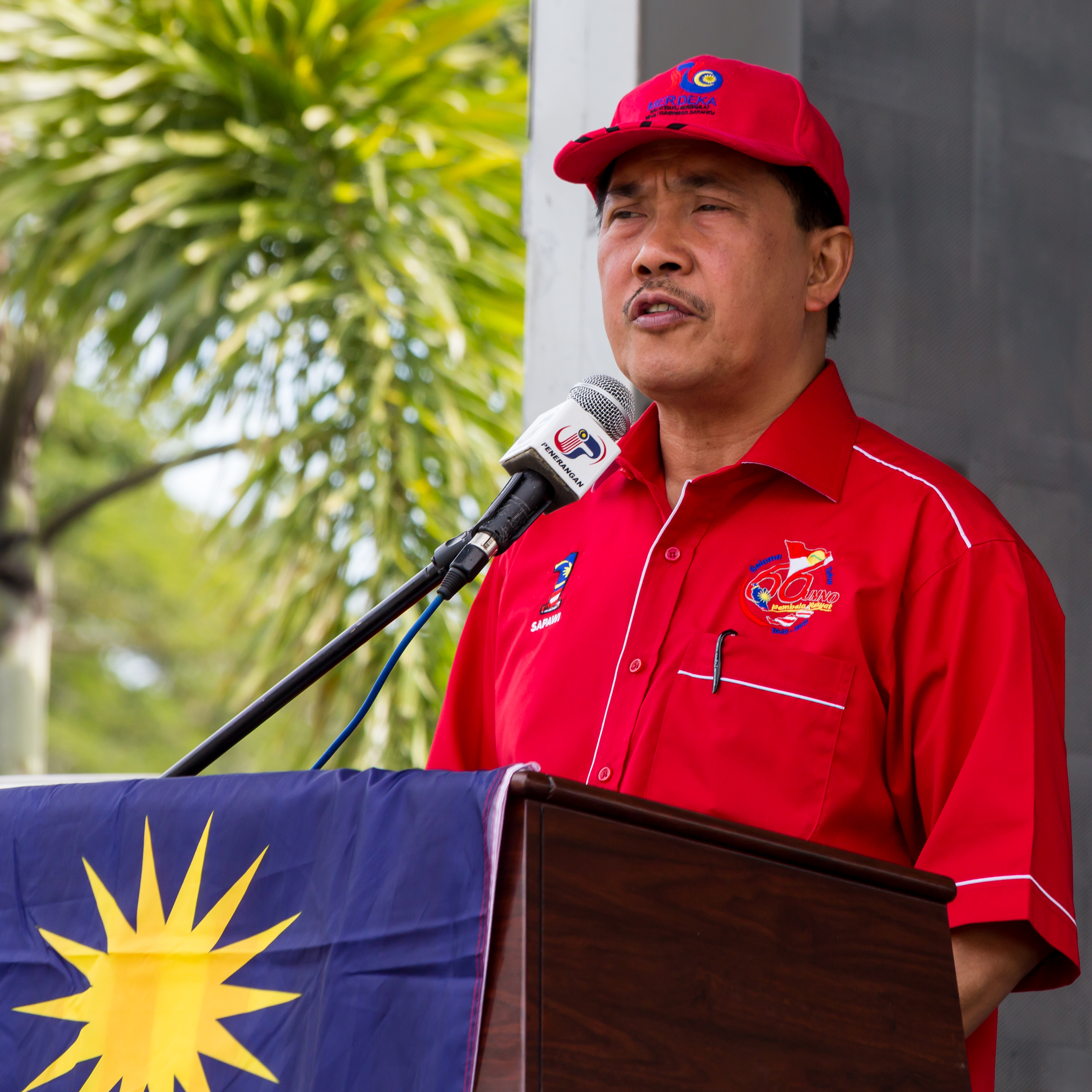

Member of the Malaysian Parliament for Sipitang
- In office 8 March 2008 – 9 May 2018
- Preceded by: Yusof Yacob (BN–UMNO)
- Succeeded by: Yamani Hafez Musa (BN-UMNO)
- Majority: 6,146 (2008); 9,469 (2013)

Supreme Council Members of GAGASAN RAKYAT Sipitang-Sindumin
- Incumbent
- Assumed office 2024

Supreme Council Members of GRS Sipitang-Sindumin
- Incumbent
- Assumed office 2024

Personal details
- Born: Sapawi bin Amat Wasali @ Ahmad; 5 July 1956 (age 70) Sipitang, Crown Colony of North Borneo (now Sabah, Malaysia)
- Party: United Malays National Organisation (UMNO) (until 2023); Parti Gagasan Rakyat Sabah (GAGASAN) (since 2024)
- Other political affiliations: Barisan Nasional (BN) (until 2023); Gabungan Rakyat Sabah (GRS) (since 2024)
- Spouse: Patimah Ali
- Children: 5
- Education: National University of Malaysia
- Occupation: Politician
- Website: datuksapawiahmad.blogspot.com

Yang Berbahagia Datuk Sapawi bin Haji Amat Wasali @ Ahmad (born 5 July 1956) is a Malaysian politician. He was the Member of the Parliament of Malaysia for the Sipitang constituency in Sabah, representing the United Malays National Organisation (UMNO) in the Barisan Nasional (BN) coalition from 2008 to May 2018. He currently an official member of GAGASAN, a component party of GRS since January 2024. He became supreme council members of both GRS Sindumin-Sipitang and GAGASAN RAKYAT Sipitang.

Sapawi was elected to Parliament in the 2008 election, replacing the UMNO incumbent Yusof Yacob in the seat of Sipitang. Before entering federal politics, Sapawi was an Assistant Minister in the Sabah State Government. He quits UMNO to join a local Sabahan's party and directly become an official member of GAGASAN, a component party of GRS since January 2024. He became supreme council members of both GRS Sipitang and GAGASAN RAKYAT Sipitang.

== Election results ==
Parliament of Malaysia
Year	Constituency	Candidate	Votes	Pct	Opponent(s)	Votes	Pct	Ballots cast	Majority	Turnout
2008	P178 Sipitang	Sapawi Ahmad (UMNO)	11,905	67.40%	Karim Tassim (PKR)	5,759	32.60%	18,195	6,146	75.42%
2013	P178 Sipitang	Sapawi Ahmad (UMNO)	16,377	68.84%	Ramlee Dua (PKR)	6,908	29.04%	24,329	9,469	83.58%
2013	P178 Sipitang	Sapawi Ahmad (UMNO)	16,377	68.84%	Kamis Daming (SAPP)	505	2.12%	24,329	9,469	83.58%

Sabah State Legislative Assembly
Year	Constituency	Candidate	Votes	Pct	Opponent(s)	Votes	Pct	Ballots cast	Majority	Turnout
2018	N28 Sindumin	Sapawi Ahmad (UMNO)	5,888	45.97%	Yusof Yacob (WARISAN)	6,648	51.90%	13,065	760	77.40%
2018	N28 Sindumin	Sapawi Ahmad (UMNO)	5,888	45.97%	Patrick Sadom (PHRS)	273	2.13%	13,065	760	77.40%

== Honours ==
- Sabah
  - Justice of the Peace (2014)
  - Commander of the Order of Kinabalu (PGDK) – Datuk (1996)
  - Companion of the Order of Kinabalu (ASDK) (1994)
