= Jamawi Ja'afar =

Malaysian politician (born 1973)

Yang Berhormat Datuk Jamawi Ja'afar PGDK MLA
- جماوي جعفر

State Minister of Agriculture, Fisheries and Food industries of Sabah
- Incumbent
- Assumed office 1 December 2025
- Governor: Musa Aman
- Chief Minister: Hajiji Noor
- Assistants: Ruslan Muharam &; Hendrus Anding
- Preceded by: Jeffrey Kitingan
- Constituency: Melalap

Member of the Sabah State Legislative Assembly for Melalap
- Incumbent
- Assumed office 29 November 2025
- Preceded by: Peter Anthony (WARISAN)
- Majority: 525 (2025)

Member of the Sabah State Legislative Assembly for Kemabong
- In office 9 May 2018 – 26 September 2020
- Preceded by: Rubin Balang (BN–UMNO)
- Succeeded by: Rubin Balang (Independent)
- Majority: 862 (2018)

Personal details
- Born: Jamawi bin Ja'afar; 8 January 1973 (age 53) Tenom, Sabah, Malaysia
- Party: United Malays National Organisation (UMNO) (until 2018, 2020–2023); Sabah Heritage Party (WARISAN) (2018–2020); Parti Gagasan Rakyat Sabah (GAGASAN) (2023–2025); People's Justice Party (PKR) (since 2025)
- Other political affiliations: Barisan Nasional (BN) (until 2018, 2020–2023); Gabungan Rakyat Sabah (GRS) (2023–2025); Pakatan Harapan (PH) (since 2025)
- Spouse: Zainatunnisa Ibrahim
- Education: University of Putra Malaysia
- Occupation: Politician
- Profession: Agropreneur

Jamawi bin Ja'afar (born 8 January 1973) is a Malaysian politician and businessman who served as the State Minister of Agriculture, Fisheries and Food Industries of Sabah since December 2025 in the Gabungan Rakyat Sabah (GRS) state administration under Chief Minister Hajiji Noor, as well as Member of Sabah State Legislative Assembly for Melalap since November 2025. He is a member of the People's Justice Party (PKR), a component party of the Pakatan Harapan (PH) coalition.

== Politics ==
He was the UMNO Youth Chief of Tenom Division and National Youth Information Chief of UMNO, under the leadership of National Youth Chief Khairy Jamaluddin. He quit UMNO in 2018 and later joined WARISAN with the reason to support Sabah local party. In 2020, he quit WARISAN because of PSS controversies and rejoined UMNO as alternative choices. After BN-UMNO lost many seats in the Malaysia General Election in November 2022, he decided to joining GRS through GRS direct membership constitution. In February 2023, he confirmed his support and joined Sabah local party GAGASAN, one of the major component party of GRS. In March 2023, he officially become the Division Chairman of Melalap branch. On 17 October 2023, he confirmed that Tenom parliamentary branch of GAGASAN has successfully reached 5,000 memberships.

=== 2025 Sabah state election ===
Jamawi sparked controversy after he was chosen as a candidate for the Melalap state constituency, where he contested under the Parti Keadilan Rakyat (PKR) ticket. His detractors, particularly from PKR members, such as the former Deputy President of PKR Rafizi Ramli, have labeled him a "frog".

On 1 December 2025, he was sworn in as a Minister in Chief Minister Hajiji's cabinet, taking the Agriculture and Food Industries portfolio, succeeding Jeffrey Kitingan.

On 25 January 2026, he was appointed as an ex-officio member of the Central Leadership Council of PKR alongside fellow Sabahan PKR members Ruji Ubi and Yamani Hafez Musa.

== Election results ==
Parliament of Malaysia
| Year | Constituency | Candidate | Votes | Pct. | Opponent(s) | Votes | Pct. | Ballots cast | Majority | Turnout |
|---|---|---|---|---|---|---|---|---|---|---|
| 2022 | P181 Tenom | Jamawi Ja'afar (Sabah UMNO) | 8,625 | 30.11% | Riduan Rubin (IND) | 10,027 | 35.00% | 28,649 | 1,108 | 68.14% |
| 2022 | P181 Tenom | Jamawi Ja'afar (Sabah UMNO) | 8,625 | 30.11% | Noorita Sual (DAP) | 8,919 | 31.13% | 28,649 | 1,108 | 68.14% |
| 2022 | P181 Tenom | Jamawi Ja'afar (Sabah UMNO) | 8,625 | 30.11% | Ukim Buandi (WARISAN) | 992 | 3.46% | 28,649 | 1,108 | 68.14% |
| 2022 | P181 Tenom | Jamawi Ja'afar (Sabah UMNO) | 8,625 | 30.11% | Peggy Chaw Zhi Ting (IND) | 86 | 0.30% | 28,649 | 1,108 | 68.14% |

Sabah State Legislative Assembly
| Year | Constituency | Candidate | Votes | Pct. | Opponent(s) | Votes | Pct. | Ballots cast | Majority | Turnout |
|---|---|---|---|---|---|---|---|---|---|---|
| 2018 | N43 Kemabong | Jamawi Ja'afar (Sabah UMNO) | 6,093 | 50.65% | Haris Bolos (WARISAN) | 5,198 | 43.21% | 12,030 | 862 | 84.93% |
| 2018 | N43 Kemabong | Jamawi Ja'afar (Sabah UMNO) | 6,093 | 50.65% | Tay Jin Kiong @ Alfred (PCS) | 152 | 1.26% | 12,030 | 862 | 84.93% |
| 2018 | N43 Kemabong | Jamawi Ja'afar (Sabah UMNO) | 6,093 | 50.65% | Yahia @ Yahya Raimah (PHRS) | 124 | 1.03% | 12,030 | 862 | 84.93% |
| 2020 | N42 Melalap | Jamawi Ja'afar (Sabah UMNO) | 3,526 | 33.25% | Peter Anthony (WARISAN) | 5,245 | 49.46% | 10,605 | 1,719 | 75.79% |
| 2020 | N42 Melalap | Jamawi Ja'afar (Sabah UMNO) | 3,526 | 33.25% | Radin Malleh (PBS) | 1,359 | 12.81% | 10,605 | 1,719 | 75.79% |
| 2020 | N42 Melalap | Jamawi Ja'afar (Sabah UMNO) | 3,526 | 33.25% | Apiang Sausun (PCS) | 268 | 2.53% | 10,605 | 1,719 | 75.79% |
| 2020 | N42 Melalap | Jamawi Ja'afar (Sabah UMNO) | 3,526 | 33.25% | Sazali Justi (USNO Baru) | 32 | 0.30% | 10,605 | 1,719 | 75.79% |
| 2020 | N42 Melalap | Jamawi Ja'afar (Sabah UMNO) | 3,526 | 33.25% | Masdin Tumas (LDP) | 23 | 0.22% | 10,605 | 1,719 | 75.79% |
| 2025 | N42 Melalap | Jamawi Ja'afar (PKR) | 5,064 | 33.80% | Priscella Peter (KDM) | 4,539 | 30.29% | 15,118 | 525 | 71.08% |
| 2025 | N42 Melalap | Jamawi Ja'afar (PKR) | 5,064 | 33.80% | Gabriel George Tulas (IND) | 2,879 | 19.22% | 15,118 | 525 | 71.08% |
| 2025 | N42 Melalap | Jamawi Ja'afar (PKR) | 5,064 | 33.80% | Junik Bajit (UPKO) | 1,702 | 11.36% | 15,118 | 525 | 71.08% |
| 2025 | N42 Melalap | Jamawi Ja'afar (PKR) | 5,064 | 33.80% | Cheld Bryend Lind (WARISAN) | 448 | 2.99% | 15,118 | 525 | 71.08% |
| 2025 | N42 Melalap | Jamawi Ja'afar (PKR) | 5,064 | 33.80% | Alviana Linus (STAR) | 271 | 1.81% | 15,118 | 525 | 71.08% |
| 2025 | N42 Melalap | Jamawi Ja'afar (PKR) | 5,064 | 33.80% | Fatimah Ibrahim (IND) | 59 | 0.39% | 15,118 | 525 | 71.08% |
| 2025 | N42 Melalap | Jamawi Ja'afar (PKR) | 5,064 | 33.80% | Kevin Chong (IMPIAN) | 21 | 0.14% | 15,118 | 525 | 71.08% |

== Honours ==
- Sabah
  - Commander of the Order of Kinabalu (PGDK) – Datuk (2023)
  - Companion of the Order of Kinabalu (ASDK) (2015)
  - Member of the Order of Kinabalu (ADK) (2009)
