= Anita Baranting =

Malaysian politician

Yang Berbahagia Datuk Lasiah @ Anita Baranting PGDK ASDK

Sabah State Minister of Community Development and Consumer Affairs
- In office 11 May 2018 – 12 May 2018
- Governor: Juhar Mahiruddin
- Chief Minister: Musa Aman
- Preceded by: Jainab Ahmad Ayid
- Succeeded by: Stephen Wong Tien Fatt as Minister of Health and People's Wellbeing

Assistant Minister of Community Development and Consumer Affairs
- In office 10 May 2013 – 9 May 2018
- Governor: Juhar Mahiruddin
- Chief Minister: Musa Aman
- Preceded by: Herbert Timbun Lagadan
- Succeeded by: Norazlinah Arif as Assistant Minister of Health and People's Wellbeing

Member of the Sabah State Legislative Assembly for Tandek
- In office 8 March 2008 – 26 September 2020
- Preceded by: Maximus Ongkili (PBS–BN)
- Succeeded by: Hendrus Anding (PBS)
- Majority: 2,237 (2008); 5,725 (2013); 4,592 (2018)

Personal details
- Born: Anita Baranting; 2 September 1954 (age 71) Kota Marudu, Crown Colony of North Borneo (now Sabah, Malaysia)
- Citizenship: Malaysian
- Party: Parti Bersatu Sabah (PBS) (until 2018); Sabah Heritage Party (WARISAN) (2019-2020); Independent (2020); Homeland Solidarity Party (STAR) (2020-present)
- Other political affiliations: Barisan Nasional (BN) (until 2018); Perikatan Nasional (PN) (2020-2022); Gabungan Rakyat Sabah (GRS) (2022-present)
- Occupation: Politician; STAR local leader

Anita Baranting is a Malaysian politician who served as the State Minister of Community Development and Consumer Affairs. He served as the Member of Sabah State Legislative Assembly (MLA) for Tandek from March 2008 until September 2020. She is an official member of the Homeland Solidarity Party (STAR) which is aligned with the ruling Gabungan Rakyat Sabah (GRS) coalition both in federal and state levels.

== Election results ==
Sabah State Legislative Assembly
Year	Constituency	Candidate	Votes	Pct	Opponent(s)	Votes	Pct	Ballots cast	Majority	Turnout
2008	N05 Tandek	Anita Baranting (PBS)	5,598	51.12%	Jurin K K Gunsalam (PKR)	3,361	30.70%	11,315	2,237	70.59%
2008	N05 Tandek	Anita Baranting (PBS)	5,598	51.12%	Andy Vilison (IND)	1,678	15.32%	11,315	2,237	70.59%
2008	N05 Tandek	Anita Baranting (PBS)	5,598	51.12%	Masingkan Masampun (BERSEKUTU)	202	1.84%	11,315	2,237	70.59%
2008	N05 Tandek	Anita Baranting (PBS)	5,598	51.12%	Isang Rawai (IND)	112	1.02%	11,315	2,237	70.59%
2013	N05 Tandek	Anita Baranting (PBS)	9,399	56.72%	Andonny Pilit (PKR)	4,124	24.89%	17,170	5,275	77.50%
2013	N05 Tandek	Anita Baranting (PBS)	9,399	56.72%	Jebon Janaun (STAR)	2,668	16.10%	17,170	5,275	77.50%
2013	N05 Tandek	Anita Baranting (PBS)	9,399	56.72%	Yapolai Kundapit (SAPP)	380	2.29%	17,170	5,275	77.50%
2018	N05 Tandek	Anita Baranting (PBS)	8,877	51.21%	Baintin Adun (WARISAN)	4,285	24.71%	18,000	4,592	74.70%
2018	N05 Tandek	Anita Baranting (PBS)	8,877	51.21%	Joel Masilung (STAR)	3,621	20.89%	18,000	4,592	74.70%
2018	N05 Tandek	Anita Baranting (PBS)	8,877	51.21%	Johnson Assan (PCS)	553	3.19%	18,000	4,592	74.70%
2020	N07 Tandek	Anita Baranting (IND)	2,364	22.95%	Hendrus Anding (PBS)	3,796	36.87%	7,443	1,432	63.55%
2020	N07 Tandek	Anita Baranting (IND)	2,364	22.95%	Padis Majingkin (UPKO)	1,986	19.29%	7,443	1,432	63.55%
2020	N07 Tandek	Anita Baranting (IND)	2,364	22.95%	Yilson Yanggun (PBRS)	1,520	14.76%	7,443	1,432	63.55%
2020	N07 Tandek	Anita Baranting (IND)	2,364	22.95%	Andy Villson (PCS)	395	3.84%	7,443	1,432	63.55%
2020	N07 Tandek	Anita Baranting (IND)	2,364	22.95%	Danny Leinsin Limpakan (LDP)	236	2.29%	7,443	1,432	63.55%

== Honours ==
- Sabah
  - Commander of the Order of Kinabalu (PGDK) – Datuk (2014)
  - Companion of the Order of Kinabalu (ASDK) (2002)
