= Sindumin (state constituency) =

State constituency in Sabah, Malaysia

Sindumin (N35)
Sabah constituency

State constituency
- Legislature: Sabah State Legislative Assembly
MLA
Yusri Pungut
Heritage
- Constituency created: 1994
- First contested: 1995
- Last contested: 2025

Demographics
- Electors (2025): 25,536

Sindumin is a state constituency in Sabah, Malaysia, that is represented in the Sabah State Legislative Assembly.

== Demographics ==
As of 2020, Sindumin has a population of 37,828 people.

Ethnic breakdown of Sindumin's electorate as of 2025
1. Muslim Bumiputera (66.0%)
2. Non-Muslim Bumiputera (29.0%)
3. Chinese (4.00%)
4. Other ethnicities (1.00%)

== History ==
=== Polling districts ===
According to the gazette issued on 31 October 2022, the Sindumin constituency has a total of 17 polling districts.

| State constituency | Polling District | Code | Location |
|---|---|---|---|
| Sindumin (N35) | Banting | 178/35/01 | SK Banting |
| Sindumin (N35) | Sindumin | 178/35/02 | SK Sindumin |
| Sindumin (N35) | Marintaman | 178/35/03 | SK Merintaman |
| Sindumin (N35) | Bandar Sipitang | 178/35/04 | SK Pekan Sipitang; SMK Pengiran Omar |
| Sindumin (N35) | Mesapol | 178/35/05 | SJK (C) Chung Hwa Mesapol; SMK Pengiran Omar II |
| Sindumin (N35) | Usuk | 178/35/06 | SK Melalia |
| Sindumin (N35) | Ulu Sipitang | 178/35/07 | SK Ulu Sipitang |
| Sindumin (N35) | Pantai | 178/35/08 | SK Pantai |
| Sindumin (N35) | Melamam | 178/35/09 | SK Melamam |
| Sindumin (N35) | Mendolong | 178/35/10 | SK Mendulong |
| Sindumin (N35) | Kelangsat | 178/35/11 | SK Kelangsat |
| Sindumin (N35) | Bole | 178/35/12 | SK Ulu Bole |
| Sindumin (N35) | Meligan | 178/35/13 | SK Meligan |
| Sindumin (N35) | Long Pasia | 178/35/14 | SK Long Pasia |
| Sindumin (N35) | Iburu | 178/35/15 | Balai Kebudayaan Iburu |
| Sindumin (N35) | Tanjung Pagar | 178/35/16 | SK Padang Berampah; SMK Padang Berampah |
| Sindumin (N35) | Kuala Muaya | 178/35/17 | SK Kebawang |

=== Representation history ===
Member of Sabah State Legislative Assembly for Sindumin
| Assembly | No | Years | Member | Party |
Constituency created from Sipitang
| 11th | N24 | 1999 – 2004 | Sapawi Ahmad | BN (UMNO) |
| 12th | N28 | 2004 – 2008 | Sapawi Ahmad | BN (UMNO) |
| 13th | N28 | 2008 – 2013 | Ahmad Bujang | BN (UMNO) |
| 14th | N28 | 2013 – 2018 | Ahmad Bujang | BN (UMNO) |
| 15th | N28 | 2018 – 2020 | Yusof Yacob | WARISAN |
| 16th | N35 | 2020 – 2021 | Yusof Yacob | WARISAN |
| 16th | N35 | 2021 – 2023 | Yusof Yacob | Independent |
| 16th | N35 | 2023 - 2025 | Yusof Yacob | GRS (GAGASAN) |
| 17th | N35 | 2025–present | Yusri Pungut | WARISAN |

== Election results ==
Sabah state election, 2025
| Party | Candidate | Votes | % | ∆% |
|---|---|---|---|---|
| Heritage | Yusri Pungut | 5,086 | 32.10 | ▼15.82 |
| PH | Yamani Hafez Musa | 4,724 | 29.82 | ▲29.82 |
| Independent | Abdillah Jalaf @ Dila | 2,570 | 16.22 | ▲16.22 |
| Homeland Solidarity Party | Moktar Matussin | 1,469 | 9.27 | ▲9.27 |
| KDM | Sani Miasin | 875 | 5.52 | ▲5.52 |
| PN | Dayang Noor Shafiqah Hamid | 705 | 4.45 | ▲4.45 |
| Sabah Dream Party | Markus Buas | 293 | 1.85 | ▲1.85 |
| Independent | Wilson Liou | 54 | 0.34 | ▲0.34 |
| Sabah Nationality Party | Kanafia Bujang | 37 | 0.23 | ▲0.23 |
| Independent | Ibrahim Tuah | 30 | 0.19 | ▲0.19 |
| Total valid votes | | 15,843 | | |
| Total rejected ballots | | 264 | | |
| Unreturned ballots | | 17 | | |
| Turnout | | 16,124 | 63.14 | ▼4.27 |
| Registered electors | | 25,536 | | |
| Majority | | 362 | 2.28 | ▼1.47 |
| Sabah Heritage Party hold | | Swing | | {{{2}}} |
Source(s) "RESULTS OF CONTESTED ELECTION AND STATEMENTS OF THE POLL AFTER THE OFFICIAL ADDITION OF VOTES" (PDF).

Sabah state election, 2020
| Party | Candidate | Votes | % | ∆% |
|---|---|---|---|---|
| Sabah Heritage Party | Yusof Yacob | 5,415 | 47.92 | ▼2.96 |
| BN | Sani Miasin | 4,991 | 44.17 | ▼0.90 |
| USNO (Baru) | Mahshur @ Manshor OKK Mohd Yasin | 365 | 3.23 | ▲3.23 |
| LDP | Daniel Gaing | 142 | 1.26 | ▲1.26 |
| Love Sabah Party | Jaebeh @ Jaybee Buaya | 114 | 1.01 | ▲1.01 |
| GAGASAN | Arifin Harith | 34 | 0.30 | ▲0.30 |
| Total valid votes | | 11,061 | 97.88 | |
| Total rejected ballots | | 208 | 1.84 | |
| Unreturned ballots | | 31 | 0.27 | |
| Turnout | | 11,300 | 67.41 | ▼10.02 |
| Registered electors | | 16,762 | | |
| Majority | | 424 | 3.75 | ▼2.06 |
| Sabah Heritage Party hold | | Swing | | {{{2}}} |
Source(s) "RESULTS OF CONTESTED ELECTION AND STATEMENTS OF THE POLL AFTER THE OFFICIAL ADDITION OF VOTES".

Sabah state election, 2018
| Party | Candidate | Votes | % | ∆% |
|---|---|---|---|---|
| Sabah Heritage Party | Yusof Yacob | 6,648 | 50.88 | ▲50.88 |
| BN | Sapawi Ahmad | 5,888 | 45.07 | ▼18.58 |
| Sabah People's Hope Party | Patrick Sadom | 273 | 2.09 | ▲2.09 |
| Total valid votes | | 12,809 | 98.04 | |
| Total rejected ballots | | 204 | 1.56 | |
| Unreturned ballots | | 52 | 0.40 | |
| Turnout | | 13,065 | 77.43 | ▼4.43 |
| Registered electors | | 16,873 | | |
| Majority | | 760 | 5.81 | ▼28.48 |
| Sabah Heritage Party gain from BN | | Swing | | ? |
Source(s) "RESULTS OF CONTESTED ELECTION AND STATEMENTS OF THE POLL AFTER THE OFFICIAL ADDITION OF VOTES".

Sabah state election, 2013
| Party | Candidate | Votes | % | ∆% |
|---|---|---|---|---|
| BN | Ahmad Bujang | 8,024 | 63.65 | ▲4.72 |
| PKR | Harunsah Ibrahim | 3,701 | 29.36 | ▼9.66 |
| SAPP | Amde @ Hamdi Sidik | 357 | 2.83 | ▲2.83 |
| STAR | Semion @ Fred Semion Sakai | 165 | 1.31 | ▲1.31 |
| Total valid votes | | 12,247 | 97.14 | |
| Total rejected ballots | | 340 | 2.70 | |
| Unreturned ballots | | 20 | 0.16 | |
| Turnout | | 12,607 | 81.86 | ▲7.34 |
| Registered electors | | 15,400 | | |
| Majority | | 4,323 | 34.29 | ▲14.38 |
| BN hold | | Swing | | |
Source(s) "KEPUTUSAN PILIHAN RAYA UMUM DEWAN UNDANGAN NEGERI".

Sabah state election, 2008
| Party | Candidate | Votes | % | ∆% |
|---|---|---|---|---|
| BN | Ahmad Bujang | 5,634 | 58.93 | ▲0.64 |
| PKR | Ramle Dua | 3,730 | 39.02 | ▲39.02 |
| Total valid votes | | 9,364 | 97.95 | |
| Total rejected ballots | | 185 | 1.94 | |
| Unreturned ballots | | 11 | 0.12 | |
| Turnout | | 9,560 | 74.52 | ▲5.77 |
| Registered electors | | 12,828 | | |
| Majority | | 1,904 | 19.91 | ▲0.74 |
| BN hold | | Swing | | |
Source(s) "KEPUTUSAN PILIHAN RAYA UMUM DEWAN UNDANGAN NEGERI SABAH BAGI TAHUN 2008".

Sabah state election, 2004
| Party | Candidate | Votes | % | ∆% |
|---|---|---|---|---|
| BN | Sapawi Ahmad | 5,073 | 58.29 | ▼7.09 |
| Independent | Ramle Dua | 3,405 | 39.12 | ▲39.12 |
| BERSEKUTU | Sumayung Using | 150 | 1.72 | ▼8.76 |
| Total valid votes | | 8,628 | 99.14 | |
| Total rejected ballots | | 65 | 0.75 | |
| Unreturned ballots | | 10 | 0.11 | |
| Turnout | | 8,703 | 68.75 | ▼5.11 |
| Registered electors | | 12,659 | | |
| Majority | | 1,668 | 19.17 | ▼11.30 |
| BN hold | | Swing | | |
Source(s) "KEPUTUSAN PILIHAN RAYA UMUM DEWAN UNDANGAN NEGERI SABAH BAGI TAHUN 2004".

Sabah state election, 1999
| Party | Candidate | Votes | % |
|---|---|---|---|
| BN | Sapawi Ahmad | 4,794 | 65.38 |
| PBS | Jamilah @ Halimah Sulaiman | 3,112 | 34.91 |
| BERSEKUTU | Sarpudin Ahmad | 934 | 10.48 |
| Total valid votes | | 8,840 | 99.16 |
| Total rejected ballots | | 75 | 0.84 |
| Unreturned ballots | | 0 | 0.00 |
| Turnout | | 8,915 | 73.86 |
| Registered electors | | 12,070 | |
| Majority | | 1,682 | 30.47 |
This was a new constituency created.
Source(s) "KEPUTUSAN PILIHAN RAYA UMUM DEWAN UNDANGAN NEGERI SABAH BAGI TAHUN 1999".
