= Lumadan =

Malaysian electoral district

Lumadan (N34)
Sabah constituency

State constituency
- Legislature: Sabah State Legislative Assembly
MLA
Ruslan Muharam
GRS
- Constituency created: 1974
- First contested: 1974
- Last contested: 2025

Demographics
- Electors (2025): 22,165

Lumadan is a state constituency in Sabah, Malaysia, that is represented in the Sabah State Legislative Assembly.

== Demographics ==
As of 2020, Lumadan has a population of 28,755 people.

Ethnic breakdown of Lumadan's electorate as of 2025
1. Muslim Bumiputera (90.0%)
2. Non-Muslim Bumiputera (6.00%)
3. Chinese (4.00%)
4. Other ethnicities (0.00%)

== History ==
=== Polling districts ===
According to the gazette issued on 31 October 2022, the Lumadan constituency has a total of 13 polling districts.

State constituency	Polling District	Code	Location
Lumadan (N34)	Kabajang	178/34/01	SK Kabajang
Lumadan (N34)	Gadong	178/34/02	SK Gadong; SK Garama
Lumadan (N34)	Lupak	178/34/03	SK Lupak
Lumadan (N34)	Padas Valley	178/34/04	SK Luagan
Lumadan (N34)	Beaufort Selatan	178/34/05	SK Pekan Beaufort; Kolej Vokesional Beaufort
Lumadan (N34)	Lumadan	178/34/06	SK Ladang Lumadan
Lumadan (N34)	Bukau	178/34/07	SK Bukau
Lumadan (N34)	Suasa	178/34/08	SK Suasa
Lumadan (N34)	Padas Damit	178/34/09	SK Padas Damit
Lumadan (N34)	Bankalalak	178/34/10	SK Bangkalalak
Lumadan (N34)	Weston	178/34/11	SK Weston; SMK Weston
Lumadan (N34)	Lubok	178/34/12	SK Lubok
Lumadan (N34)	Lingkungan	178/34/13	SK Lingkungan; SK Maraba

=== Representation history ===
Member of Sabah State Legislative Assembly for Lumadan
Assembly	No	Years	Member	Party
Constituency created from Beaufort
5th	N36	1976	Mohamed Dun Banir	BERJAYA
5th	N36	1976 – 1981	Mohamed Dun Banir	BN (BERJAYA)
6th	N36	1981	Mohamed Dun Banir	BN (BERJAYA)
6th	N36	1981 – 1985	Johari Mohamed Dun	BN (BERJAYA)
7th	N37	1985 – 1986	Dayang Mahani Pengiran Ahmad Raffae	USNO
8th	N37	1986 – 1990	Dayang Mahani Pengiran Ahmad Raffae	USNO
9th	N37	1990 – 1994	Dayang Mahani Pengiran Ahmad Raffae	USNO
10th	N37	1994 – 1999	Dayang Mahani Pengiran Ahmad Raffae	BN (USNO)
11th	N23	1999 – 2004	Sarinum Sadikun	BN (UMNO)
12th	N27	2004 – 2008	Sarinum Sadikun	BN (UMNO)
13th	N27	2008 – 2013	Kamarlin Ombi	BN (UMNO)
14th	N27	2013 – 2018	Kamarlin Ombi	BN (UMNO)
15th	N27	2018	Matbali Musah	BN (UMNO)
15th	N27	2018 – 2019	Matbali Musah	Independent
15th	N27	2019 – 2020	Matbali Musah	PH (BERSATU)
15th	N27	2020	Matbali Musah	PN (BERSATU)
16th	N34	2020 – 2025	Ruslan Muharam	GRS (PBS)
17th	N34	2025–present	Ruslan Muharam	GRS (PBS)

== Election results ==
Sabah state election, 2025: Lumadan
Party	Candidate	Votes	%	∆%
GRS	Ruslan Muharam	7,967	52.72	▲52.72
BN	Nazri Abdullah	3,713	24.57	▼5.28
Heritage	Mohammd Noorizuan Awang	2,528	16.73	▼9.24
Homeland Solidarity Party	Amit Basrin	407	2.69	▲2.69
KDM	Abdul Jarih Ukin	335	2.22	▲2.22
Sabah Dream Party	Jurinah Nasir	161	1.07	▲1.07
Total valid votes		15,111		
Total rejected ballots		287		
Unreturned ballots		12		
Turnout		15,410	69.52	▼3.67
Registered electors		22,165		
Majority		4,254	28.15	▲24.85
GRS gain from PBS		Swing		?
Source(s) "RESULTS OF CONTESTED ELECTION AND STATEMENTS OF THE POLL AFTER THE OFFICIAL ADDITION OF VOTES" (PDF).

Sabah state election, 2020: Lumadan
Party	Candidate	Votes	%	∆%
PBS	Ruslan Muharam	3,650	33.15	▲33.15
BN	Kamarlin Ombi	3,286	29.85	▼25.19
Sabah Heritage Party	Ag Ku Zaidi Pg Wahab	2,859	25.97	▼5.44
USNO (Baru)	Ali Dad Fazal Elahi	254	2.31	▲2.31
Love Sabah Party	Malik Unsat	231	2.10	▲2.10
Sabah People's Unity Party	Dayang Aezzy Liman	59	0.54	▲0.54
Independent	Mohd Saidi Manan	46	0.42	▲0.42
GAGASAN	Sahlih Sirin	44	0.40	▲0.40
Total valid votes		10,564	95.95	
Total rejected ballots		298		
Unreturned ballots		148		
Turnout		11,010	73.19	▼11.74
Registered electors		15,044		
Majority		364	3.30	▼20.33
PBS gain from BN		Swing		?
Source(s) "RESULTS OF CONTESTED ELECTION AND STATEMENTS OF THE POLL AFTER THE OFFICIAL ADDITION OF VOTES".

Sabah state election, 2018: Lumadan
Party	Candidate	Votes	%	∆%
BN	Matbali Musah	6,836	55.04	▲1.24
Sabah Heritage Party	Mohd Samlih Juaisin	3,901	31.41	▲31.41
Sabah People's Hope Party	Asmat Japar	1,331	10.72	▲10.72
Total valid votes		12,068	97.17	
Total rejected ballots		286	2.30	
Unreturned ballots		66	0.53	
Turnout		12,420	84.93	▼0.57
Registered electors		15,009		
Majority		2,935	23.63	▼9.15
BN hold		Swing		
Source(s) "RESULTS OF CONTESTED ELECTION AND STATEMENTS OF THE POLL AFTER THE OFFICIAL ADDITION OF VOTES".

Sabah state election, 2013: Lumadan
Party	Candidate	Votes	%	∆%
BN	Kamarlin Ombi	6,338	53.80	▼13.30
Independent	Rapahi Edris	2,476	21.02	▲21.02
PKR	Abdul Rahman Mohd Yakub	2,303	19.55	▼8.79
STAR	Mohd Jaafar Ibrahim	147	1.25	▲1.25
SAPP	Jamain Sarudin	143	1.21	▲1.21
Independent	Saudi Suhaili	69	0.59	▲0.59
Total valid votes		11,476	97.42	
Total rejected ballots		246	2.09	
Unreturned ballots		58	0.49	
Turnout		11,780	85.50	▲10.35
Registered electors		13,777		
Majority		3,862	32.78	▼5.98
BN hold		Swing		
Source(s) "KEPUTUSAN PILIHAN RAYA UMUM DEWAN UNDANGAN NEGERI".

Sabah state election, 2008: Lumadan
Party	Candidate	Votes	%	∆%
BN	Kamarlin Ombi	5,707	67.10	▲11.49
PKR	Dojit Muda	2,410	28.34	▲28.34
Independent	Brahim Awang Anak	107	1.26	▲1.26
Total valid votes		8,224	96.70	
Total rejected ballots		276	3.25	
Unreturned ballots		5	0.06	
Turnout		8,505	75.15	▲4.62
Registered electors		11,317		
Majority		3,297	38.76	▲25.75
BN hold		Swing		
Source(s) "KEPUTUSAN PILIHAN RAYA UMUM DEWAN UNDANGAN NEGERI SABAH BAGI TAHUN 2008".

Sabah state election, 2004: Lumadan
Party	Candidate	Votes	%	∆%
BN	Sarinum Sadikun	4,269	55.61	▼0.85
SETIA	Dojit Muda	3,270	42.60	▲38.83
Total valid votes		7,539	98.22	
Total rejected ballots		137	1.78	
Unreturned ballots		0	0.00	
Turnout		7,676	70.53	▼7.28
Registered electors		10,883		
Majority		999	13.01	▼15.50
BN hold		Swing		
Source(s) "KEPUTUSAN PILIHAN RAYA UMUM DEWAN UNDANGAN NEGERI SABAH BAGI TAHUN 2004".

Sabah state election, 1999: Lumadan
Party	Candidate	Votes	%	∆%
BN	Sarinum Sadikun	4,678	56.46	▼4.88
PBS	Yusof Judin	2,316	27.95	▼9.38
PKR	Abdul Sulaiman Omar	847	10.22	▲10.22
SETIA	Jahari @ Johari Mohd Dun	312	3.77	▲3.77
Total valid votes		8,153	98.41	
Total rejected ballots		132	1.59	
Unreturned ballots		0	0.00	
Turnout		8,285	77.81	▼3.43
Registered electors		10,648		
Majority		2,362	28.51	▲4.50
BN hold		Swing		
Source(s) "KEPUTUSAN PILIHAN RAYA UMUM DEWAN UNDANGAN NEGERI SABAH BAGI TAHUN 1999".

Sabah state election, 1994: Lumadan
Party	Candidate	Votes	%	∆%
BN	Dayang Mahani Pengiran Ahmad Raffae	4,517	61.34	▲14.42
PBS	Sadi @ Sadih Nasah	2,749	37.33	▲5.05
Total valid votes		7,266	98.67	
Total rejected ballots		98	1.33	
Unreturned ballots		0	0.00	
Turnout		7,364	81.24	▲2.67
Registered electors		9,065		
Majority		1,768	24.01	▲9.37
BN gain from USNO		Swing		?
Source(s) "KEPUTUSAN PILIHAN RAYA UMUM DEWAN UNDANGAN NEGERI SABAH BAGI TAHUN 1994".

Sabah state election, 1990: Lumadan
Party	Candidate	Votes	%	∆%
USNO	Dayang Mahani Pengiran Ahmad Raffae	2,916	46.92	▼20.89
PBS	Moktani Lawi	2,006	32.28	▲1.63
BERJAYA	Edin Ansim	1,083	17.43	▲17.43
PRS	Mathew Badong	92	1.48	▲1.48
Total valid votes		6,097	98.10	
Total rejected ballots		118	1.90	
Unreturned ballots		0	0.00	
Turnout		6,215	78.57	▲5.41
Registered electors		7,910		
Majority		910	14.64	▼22.52
USNO hold		Swing		
Source(s) "KEPUTUSAN PILIHAN RAYA UMUM DEWAN UNDANGAN NEGERI SABAH BAGI TAHUN 1990".

Sabah state election, 1986: Lumadan
Party	Candidate	Votes	%	∆%
USNO	Dayang Mahani Pengiran Ahmad Raffae	3,737	67.81	▲22.02
PBS	Rashid Gador @ Abdul Rashid Gador	1,689	30.65	▲30.65
Total valid votes		5,426	98.46	
Total rejected ballots		85	1.54	
Unreturned ballots		0	0.00	
Turnout		5,511	73.16	▼7.16
Registered electors		7,533		
Majority		2,048	37.16	▲33.34
USNO hold		Swing		▲33.34
Source(s) "KEPUTUSAN PILIHAN RAYA UMUM DEWAN UNDANGAN NEGERI SABAH BAGI TAHUN 1986".

Sabah state election, 1981: Lumadan
Party	Candidate	Votes	%	∆%
BERJAYA	Mohd. Dun Banir	2,300	49.61	▲15.27
USNO	Mohammad Yassin Buraw	2,123	45.79	▼19.49
PASOK	Anah Tuali	126	2.72	▲2.72
Independent	Ramleh Salleh	87	1.88	▲1.50
Total valid votes		4,636	100.00	
Total rejected ballots		99		
Unreturned ballots		0		
Turnout		4,735	80.32	▼5.73
Registered electors		5,895		
Majority		177	3.82	▼27.12
BERJAYA gain from USNO		Swing		▼27.12

Sabah state election, 1976: Lumadan
Party	Candidate	Votes	%
USNO	Mohd. Dun Banir	2,568	65.28
BERJAYA	J. Abdullah Lawasah	1,351	34.34
Independent	Moktar Ahmad	15	0.38
Total valid votes		3,934	100.00
Total rejected ballots		107	
Unreturned ballots		0	
Turnout		4,041	86.05
Registered electors		4,696	
Majority		1,217	30.94
This was a new constituency created.
