= Ruslan Muharam =

Malaysian politician (born 1963)

Yang Berhormat Datuk Haji Ruslan Muharam PGDK PPN MLA
- رُسْلَان مُحَرَّم

State Assistant Minister of Agriculture, Fisheries and Food Industries of Sabah
- Incumbent
- Assumed office 2 December 2025 Serving with Hendrus Anding
- Minister: Jamawi Ja'afar
- Governor: Musa Aman
- Chief Minister: Hajiji Noor
- Preceded by: Peto Galim
- Constituency: Lumadan

State Assistant Minister to the Chief Minister of Sabah
- In office 26 January 2023 – 30 November 2025 Serving with Abidin Madingkir & Nizam Abu Bakar Titingan
- Governor: Juhar Mahiruddin (2023–2024); Musa Aman (2025)
- Chief Minister: Hajiji Noor
- Preceded by: Position established
- Succeeded by: Ceasar Mandela Malakun
- Constituency: Lumadan

Member of the Sabah State Legislative Assembly for Lumadan
- Incumbent
- Assumed office 26 September 2020
- Preceded by: Matbali Musah (BN–UMNO)
- Majority: 364 (2020); 4,254 (2025)

Deputy President of the United Sabah Party (Muslim Bumiputera)
- Incumbent
- Assumed office 27 September 2026 Serving with: Joniston Bangkuai (Non-Muslim Bumiputera) &; Lo Su Fui (Chinese)
- President: Joachim Gunsalam
- Preceded by: Jahid Jahim

Vice President of the United Sabah Party (Muslim Bumiputera)
- In office 2003 – 26 September 2026 Serving with Hendrus Anding & Johnny Mositun & Daniel Kinsik & Mursid Mohd Rais & Arthur Sen Siong Choo & Linda Tsen Thau Lin & Peter Mak (died 2025)
- President: Joseph Pairin Kitingan (2003–2017); Maximus Ongkili (2017–2024); Joachim Gunsalam (Acting) (2024–2026)
- Succeeded by: Sahrol Mahoolop

Personal details
- Born: Ruslan bin Muharam; 3 November 1963 (age 62) Beaufort, Sabah, Malaysia
- Citizenship: Malaysia
- Party: United Sabah Party (PBS)
- Other political affiliations: Barisan Nasional (BN) (until 2018); Gabungan Rakyat Sabah (GRS) (since 2020)
- Spouse: Nursiah Santri
- Education: University of Technology Malaysia (UTM) (Master's Degree in Political Science)
- Occupation: Politician
- Ruslan Muharam on Facebook

Ruslan bin Muharam (born 3 November 1963) is a Malaysian politician who has served as the State Assistant Minister of Agriculture, Fisheries and Food Industries of Sabah in the Gabungan Rakyat Sabah (GRS) state administration under Chief Minister Hajiji Noor and Minister Jamawi Ja'afar since December 2025, State Assistant Minister to the Chief Minister of Sabah under Chief Minister Hajiji Noor from January 2023 until November 2025 as well as Member of the Sabah State Legislative Assembly (MLA) for Lumadan since September 2020. He is a member of the United Sabah Party (PBS), a component party of the GRS and formerly Barisan Nasional (BN) coalitions. He served as a Vice President of PBS (Muslim Bumiputera quota) from 2003 until September 2026 and currently serving as the Deputy President of PBS for the Muslim Bumiputera quota since September 2026.

== Election result ==
Sabah State Legislative Assembly
Year	Constituency	Candidate	Votes	Pct	Opponent(s)	Votes	Pct	Ballots cast	Majority	Turnout
2020	N34 Lumadan	Ruslan Muharam (PBS)	3,650	33.15%	Kamarlin Ombi (Sabah UMNO)	3,286	29.85%	11,010	364	73.19%
2020	N34 Lumadan	Ruslan Muharam (PBS)	3,650	33.15%	Ag Ku Zaidi Pg Wahab (WARISAN)	2,859	25.97%	11,010	364	73.19%
2020	N34 Lumadan	Ruslan Muharam (PBS)	3,650	33.15%	Ali Dad Fazal Elahi (USNO Baru)	254	2.31%	11,010	364	73.19%
2020	N34 Lumadan	Ruslan Muharam (PBS)	3,650	33.15%	Malik Unsat (PCS)	231	2.10%	11,010	364	73.19%
2020	N34 Lumadan	Ruslan Muharam (PBS)	3,650	33.15%	Dayang Aezzy Liman (PPRS)	59	0.54%	11,010	364	73.19%
2020	N34 Lumadan	Ruslan Muharam (PBS)	3,650	33.15%	Mohd Saidi Manan (IND)	46	0.42%	11,010	364	73.19%
2020	N34 Lumadan	Ruslan Muharam (PBS)	3,650	33.15%	Sahlih Sirin (GAGASAN)	44	0.40%	11,010	364	73.19%
2025	N34 Lumadan	Ruslan Muharam (PBS)	7,967	52.72%	Mohd Nazri Abdullah (Sabah UMNO)	3,713	24.57%	15,398	4,254	69.52%
2025	N34 Lumadan	Ruslan Muharam (PBS)	7,967	52.72%	Mohammad Norizhuan Awang (WARISAN)	2,528	16.73%	15,398	4,254	69.52%
2025	N34 Lumadan	Ruslan Muharam (PBS)	7,967	52.72%	Amit Basrin (STAR)	407	2.69%	15,398	4,254	69.52%
2025	N34 Lumadan	Ruslan Muharam (PBS)	7,967	52.72%	Abdul Jarih Okin (KDM)	335	2.22%	15,398	4,254	69.52%
2025	N34 Lumadan	Ruslan Muharam (PBS)	7,967	52.72%	Jurinah Nasir (IMPIAN)	161	1.07%	15,398	4,254	69.52%

== Honours ==
- Malaysia
  - Companion of the Order of the Defender of the Realm (JMN) (2018)
  - Medal of the Order of the Defender of the Realm (PPN) (2004)
- Sabah
  - Commander of the Order of Kinabalu (PGDK) – Datuk (2022)
  - Companion of the Order of Kinabalu (ASDK) (2020)
  - Member of the Order of Kinabalu (ADK) (2006)
