= Kemabong =

Sabah state constituency

Kemabong (N43)
Sabah constituency

State constituency
- Legislature: Sabah State Legislative Assembly
MLA
Rubin Balang
GRS
- Constituency created: 1974
- First contested: 1974
- Last contested: 2025

Demographics
- Electors (2025): 23,168

Sculpture of a blowpipe at the roundabout of Pekan Kemabong

Kemabong is a state constituency in Sabah, Malaysia, that is represented in the Sabah State Legislative Assembly.

== Demographics ==
As of 2020, Kemabong has a population of 25,146 people.

Ethnic breakdown of Kemabong's electorate as of 2025
1. Non-Muslim Bumiputera (75.0%)
2. Muslim Bumiputera (21.0%)
3. Chinese (4.00%)
4. Other ethnicities (0.00%)

== History ==
=== Polling districts ===
According to the gazette issued on 31 October 2022, the Kemabong constituency has a total of 12 polling districts.

State constituency	Polling District	Code	Location
Kemabong (N43)	Chinta Mata	181/43/01	SK Chinta Mata
Kemabong (N43)	Sapong	181/43/02	SK Ladang Sapong
Kemabong (N43)	Mansasoh	181/43/03	SK Sungai Api
Kemabong (N43)	Enubai	181/43/04	SK Inubai
Kemabong (N43)	Paal	181/43/05	SJK (C) Yuk Nam
Kemabong (N43)	Baru Jumpa	181/43/06	SK Kg Baru Jumpa
Kemabong (N43)	Kemabong	181/43/07	SMK Kemabong; SK Korolok
Kemabong (N43)	Tomani	181/43/08	SK Kuala Tomani
Kemabong (N43)	Rundum	181/43/09	SK Rundum
Kemabong (N43)	Kapulu	181/43/10	SK Kapalu
Kemabong (N43)	Katuboh	181/43/11	Rumah Kebudayaan Katubuh
Kemabong (N43)	Ulu Tomani	181/43/12	SK Ulu Tomani; SK Tilis; SK Kungkular; SK Sumambu

=== Representation history ===
Member of Sabah State Legislative Assembly for Kemabong
Assembly	No	Years	Member	Party
Constituency created from Tenom and Sipitang-Ulu Padas
5th	N45	1976	Albert Chew Ah Nyuk	BERJAYA
5th	N45	1976 – 1980	Albert Chew Ah Nyuk	BN (BERJAYA)
5th	N45	1980 – 1981	Justin Sanggau	BN (BERJAYA)
6th	N45	1981 – 1985	Justin Sanggau	BN (BERJAYA)
7th	N40	1985 – 1986	Limun Laikim	PBS
8th	N40	1986 – 1990	Limun Laikim	PBS
9th	N40	1990 – 1994	Esar Andamas	GR (PBS)
10th	N40	1994	Rubin Balang	GR (PBS)
10th	N40	1994 – 1999	Rubin Balang	BN (UMNO)
11th	N31	1999 – 2004	Rubin Balang	BN (UMNO)
12th	N36	2004 – 2008	Rubin Balang	BN (UMNO)
13th	N36	2008 – 2013	Rubin Balang	BN (UMNO)
14th	N36	2013 – 2018	Rubin Balang	BN (UMNO)
15th	N36	2018	Jamawi Ja’afar	BN (UMNO)
15th	N36	2018	Jamawi Ja’afar	Independent
15th	N36	2018 – 2020	Jamawi Ja’afar	WARISAN
15th	N36	2020	Jamawi Ja’afar	Independent
16th	N43	2020	Rubin Balang	Independent
16th	N43	2020 – 2022	Rubin Balang	GRS (BERSATU)
16th	N43	2022 – 2023	Rubin Balang	GRS (Direct)
16th	N43	2023 – 2025	Rubin Balang	GRS (GAGASAN)
17th	N43	2025–present	Rubin Balang	GRS (GAGASAN)

== Election results ==
Sabah state election, 2025: Kemabong
Party	Candidate	Votes	%	∆%
GRS	Rubin Balang	6,326	39.77	▲39.77
PH	Noorita Sual	4,197	26.38	▲26.38
BN	Rahmah Jan Sulaiman	2,877	18.09	▼8.26
Heritage	Burnley Balang	1,317	8.28	▲8.28
KDM	Yabri Onos	720	4.53	▲4.53
Homeland Solidarity Party	Hasmin @ Azroy Abdullah	232	1.46	▲1.46
Sabah Dream Party	Jasini Angkiwan	103	0.65	▲0.65
Independent	Petrus Yahya	103	0.65	▲0.65
Sabah People's Unity Party	Rassedi Liaron	33	0.21	▲0.21
Total valid votes		15,908		
Total rejected ballots		276		
Unreturned ballots		22		
Turnout		16,206	69.95	▼4.66
Registered electors		23,168		
Majority		2,129	13.39	▲4.40
GRS gain from Independent		Swing		-
Source(s) "RESULTS OF CONTESTED ELECTION AND STATEMENTS OF THE POLL AFTER THE OFFICIAL ADDITION OF VOTES" (PDF).

Sabah state election, 2020: Kemabong
Party	Candidate	Votes	%	∆%
Independent	Rubin Balang	4,214	37.44	▲37.44
UPKO	Lucas Umbul	3,202	28.45	▲28.45
BN	Raime Unggi	2,966	26.35	▼24.30
LDP	Juster Peter	268	2.38	▲2.38
Love Sabah Party	Tay Jin Kiong @ Alfred	229	2.03	▲0.77
USNO (Baru)	Rainus Sagulau	73	0.65	▲0.65
Total valid votes		10,982	97.57	
Total rejected ballots		288	2.56	
Unreturned ballots		16	0.14	
Turnout		11,256	74.61	▼10.32
Registered electors		15,086		
Majority		1,012	8.99	▲1.55
Independent gain from BN		Swing		-
Source(s) "RESULTS OF CONTESTED ELECTION AND STATEMENTS OF THE POLL AFTER THE OFFICIAL ADDITION OF VOTES".

Sabah state election, 2018: Kemabong
Party	Candidate	Votes	%	∆%
BN	Jamawi Ja’afar	6,093	50.65	▼1.23
Sabah Heritage Party	Haris Bolos	5,198	43.21	▲43.21
Love Sabah Party	Tay Jin Kiong @ Alfred	152	1.26	▲1.26
Sabah People's Hope Party	Yahia @ Yahya Raimah	124	1.03	▲1.03
Total valid votes		11,567	96.15	
Total rejected ballots		410	3.41	
Unreturned ballots		53	0.44	
Turnout		12,030	84.93	▲0.94
Registered electors		15,186		
Majority		862	7.44	▼19.84
BN hold		Swing		
Source(s) "RESULTS OF CONTESTED ELECTION AND STATEMENTS OF THE POLL AFTER THE OFFICIAL ADDITION OF VOTES".

Sabah state election, 2013: Kemabong
Party	Candidate	Votes	%	∆%
BN	Rubin Balang	5,765	51.88	▼9.22
PKR	Biou Suyan	2,733	24.60	▼7.63
STAR	Tay Jin Kiong @ Alfred	1,155	10.39	▲10.39
SAPP	William Ensor Tingkalor	1,047	9.42	▲9.42
Total valid votes		10,700	96.29	
Total rejected ballots		404	3.64	
Unreturned ballots		8	0.07	
Turnout		11,112	83.99	▲4.33
Registered electors		13,230		
Majority		3,032	27.28	▼1.59
BN hold		Swing		
Source(s) "KEPUTUSAN PILIHAN RAYA UMUM DEWAN UNDANGAN NEGERI".

Sabah state election, 2008: Kemabong
Party	Candidate	Votes	%	∆%
BN	Rubin Balang	5,158	61.10	▲8.57
PKR	Peter Lunuk @ Phillip Lonok	2,721	32.23	▲32.23
BERSEKUTU	Auren Tegko	337	3.99	▲3.99
Total valid votes		8,216	97.32	
Total rejected ballots		226	2.68	
Unreturned ballots		0	0.00	
Turnout		8,442	79.66	▲5.94
Registered electors		10,598		
Majority		2,437	28.87	▼3.88
BN hold		Swing		
Source(s) "KEPUTUSAN PILIHAN RAYA UMUM DEWAN UNDANGAN NEGERI SABAH BAGI TAHUN 2008".

Sabah state election, 2004: Kemabong
Party	Candidate	Votes	%	∆%
BN	Rubin Balang	4,027	52.53	▼0.20
Independent	Peter Lunuk @ Phillip Lonok	1,516	19.78	▲19.78
Independent	Limun Laikim	1,319	17.21	▲17.21
Independent	Mutang @ Sylvester Dawat	446	5.82	▲5.82
Independent	Sim N.C. Rikin	35	0.47	▲0.47
Total valid votes		7,343	95.79	
Total rejected ballots		322	4.20	
Unreturned ballots		1	0.01	
Turnout		7,666	73.72	▼6.99
Registered electors		10,399		
Majority		2,511	32.75	▲23.45
BN hold		Swing		
Source(s) "KEPUTUSAN PILIHAN RAYA UMUM DEWAN UNDANGAN NEGERI SABAH BAGI TAHUN 2004".

Sabah state election, 1999: Kemabong
Party	Candidate	Votes	%	∆%
BN	Rubin Balang	4,741	52.73	▲13.33
PBS	Esar Andamas	3,905	43.43	▼15.08
BERSEKUTU	David Jani	274	3.05	▲2.15
Total valid votes		8,940	99.21	
Total rejected ballots		71	0.79	
Unreturned ballots		0	0.00	
Turnout		8,991	80.71	▼0.99
Registered electors		11,140		
Majority		836	9.30	▼9.81
BN gain from PBS		Swing		?
Source(s) "KEPUTUSAN PILIHAN RAYA UMUM DEWAN UNDANGAN NEGERI SABAH BAGI TAHUN 1999".

Sabah state election, 1994: Kemabong
Party	Candidate	Votes	%	∆%
PBS	Rubin Balang	3,521	58.51	▼8.37
BN	Bobbey Ahfang Suan	2,371	39.40	▲24.47
BERSEKUTU	Lim Antuka	54	0.90	▲0.90
Total valid votes		5,946	98.80	
Total rejected ballots		72	1.20	
Unreturned ballots		0	0.00	
Turnout		6,018	81.70	▲0.48
Registered electors		7,366		
Majority		1,150	19.11	▼32.84
PBS hold		Swing		
Source(s) "KEPUTUSAN PILIHAN RAYA UMUM DEWAN UNDANGAN NEGERI SABAH BAGI TAHUN 1994".

Sabah state election, 1990: Kemabong
Party	Candidate	Votes	%	∆%
PBS	Esar Andamas	3,636	66.88	▲8.15
USNO	Bernard Wong Chung Ngin	812	14.93	▼5.88
BERJAYA	Abdayol Ampuli	585	10.76	▲10.76
AKAR	Enggau Garinang	163	2.81	▲2.81
PRS	Abdayol Ampuli	153	0.90	▲0.90
Total valid votes		5,349	98.38	
Total rejected ballots		88	1.62	
Unreturned ballots		0	0.00	
Turnout		5,437	81.22	▲0.99
Registered electors		6,694		
Majority		2,824	51.95	▲14.03
PBS hold		Swing		
Source(s) "KEPUTUSAN PILIHAN RAYA UMUM DEWAN UNDANGAN NEGERI SABAH BAGI TAHUN 1990".

Sabah state election, 1986: Kemabong
Party	Candidate	Votes	%	∆%
PBS	Limun Laikim	2,574	58.73	▲8.58
USNO	Asmawie Chew Ah Ngok	912	20.81	▲20.81
Independent	Angagon Anbou @ Angkangon Sagul	835	19.05	▲19.05
Total valid votes		4,294	97.97	
Total rejected ballots		62	1.41	
Unreturned ballots		0	0.00	
Turnout		4,383	80.23	▲1.65
Registered electors		5,463		
Majority		1,662	37.92	▲27.72
PBS hold		Swing		{{{2}}}
Source(s) "KEPUTUSAN PILIHAN RAYA UMUM DEWAN UNDANGAN NEGERI SABAH BAGI TAHUN 1986".

Sabah state election, 1985: Kemabong
Party	Candidate	Votes	%	∆%
PBS	Limun Laikim	1,863	50.15	▲50.15
BERJAYA	Douglas Lind	1,484	39.95	▼26.63
Independent	Peter Esang	206	5.55	▲4.11
BERSEPADU	Amir Asok	95	2.56	▲2.56
PASOK	Richard Joseph	67	1.80	▼30.18
Total valid votes		3,715	100.00	
Total rejected ballots		81		
Unreturned ballots		0		
Turnout		3,796	78.58	▲0.81
Registered electors		4,831		
Majority		379	10.20	▼24.39
PBS gain from BERJAYA		Swing		-

Sabah state election, 1981: Kemabong
Party	Candidate	Votes	%	∆%
BERJAYA	Justin Sanggau	1,996	66.58	▼13.13
PASOK	Shariff Tambi	959	31.99	▲31.99
Independent	Yaakub Tingkalor Lampang	43	1.43	▼18.86
Total valid votes		2,998	100.00	
Total rejected ballots		98		
Unreturned ballots		0		
Turnout		3,096	77.77	▲11.29
Registered electors		3,981		
Majority		1,037	34.59	▼24.82
BERJAYA hold		Swing		{{{2}}}

Sabah state election, 1980: Kemabong
Party	Candidate	Votes	%	∆%
BERJAYA	Justin Sanggau	2,007	79.71	▲19.32
Independent	Sandig Ampara	511	20.29	▲17.83
Total valid votes		2,518	100.00	
Total rejected ballots		159		
Unreturned ballots		0		
Turnout		2,677	66.48	▼16.91
Registered electors		4,027		
Majority		1,496	59.41	▲36.17
BERJAYA hold		Swing		{{{2}}}

Sabah state election, 1976: Kemabong
Party	Candidate	Votes	%
BERJAYA	Asmawie Chew Ah Ngok	1,598	60.39
USNO	Yaakub Tingkalor Lampang	983	37.15
Independent	Pangal Engoh	65	2.46
Total valid votes		2,646	100.00
Total rejected ballots		161	
Unreturned ballots		0	
Turnout		2,807	83.39
Registered electors		3,366	
Majority		615	23.24
This was a new constituency created
