= 17th Sabah State Legislative Assembly =

Malaysian subnational assembly

←	16th Assembly	18th Assembly	→

Overview
- Legislative body: Sabah State Legislative Assembly
- Jurisdiction: Sabah
- Meeting place: Sabah State Legislative Assembly Building
- Term: 11 December 2025 – present
- Election: 2025 state election
- Government: Second Hajiji cabinet
- Website: dun.sabah.gov.my
- Members: 73 elected members (+6 nominated members)
- Speaker: Kadzim M Yahya
- Chief Minister: Hajiji Noor
- Secretary: Rafidah Maqbol Rahman
- Opposition Leader: Shafie Apdal
- Party control: Gabungan Rakyat Sabah+ (GRS+)

Sovereign
- Yang di-Pertua Negeri: Musa Aman

Sessions
- 1st: 1st Meeting: 11 December 2025 – 17 December 2025
- 2nd: 1st Meeting: 23 April 2026 – 30 April 2026; 2nd Meeting : 20 July 2026 – 23 July 2026

The 17th Sabah State Legislative Assembly is the current term of the Sabah State Legislative Assembly, the legislative branch of the Government of Sabah in Sabah, Malaysia. The 17th Assembly has 79 members, of whom 73 are elected in the 2025 Sabah State Election, and 6 are appointed by the Government. The term of the 17th Assembly began upon the successful conclusion of the state election and is scheduled to last for a maximum of five years ahead of the subsequent state election.

== Background ==
=== Speakership ===
- Speaker: Kadzim Yahya (non-MLA)
- Deputy Speaker:
  - Al Hambra Juhar (non-MLA)
  - Richard Yong We Kong (non-MLA)

=== Other parliamentary officers ===
- Secretary: Rafidah Maqbol Rahman
- Deputy Secretary: Jayreh Jaya
- Serjeants-at-Arms: Mohd Sabri Metan
- Deputy Serjeants-at-Arms: Mahar Rungkim

==== Government ====
- Leader of the Gabungan Rakyat Sabah (GRS) and the component party, Parti Gagasan Rakyat Sabah (GAGASAN): Hajiji Noor (Chief Minister & Sulaman MLA)
  - Acting Leader of the United Sabah Party (PBS): Joachim Gunsalam (Deputy Chief Minister & Kundasang MLA)
  - Leader of the United Progressive Kinabalu Organisation (UPKO): Ewon Benedick (Deputy Chief Minister, MP of Penampang & Kadamaian MLA)
- Leader of the Barisan Nasional (BN) of Sabah and the component party, United Sabah People's Party (PBRS): Arthur Joseph Kurup (Federal Minister, MP of Pensiangan & Sook MLA)
  - Leader of the United Malays National Organisation (UMNO) of Sabah: Jafry Ariffin (Minister & Sukau MLA)
- Leader of the Homeland Solidarity Party (STAR): Jeffrey Kitingan (MP of Keningau & Tambunan MLA)
- Leader of the Perikatan Nasional (PN) and the component party, Malaysian Islamic Party (PAS) of Sabah: Aliakbar Gulasan (Karambunai MLA)

==== Opposition ====
- Leader of the Heritage Party (WARISAN) of Sabah: Shafie Apdal (Leader of the Opposition, MP of Semporna & Senallang MLA)
- Leader of the Social Democratic Harmony Party (KDM): Rusdin Riman (Paginatan MLA)

==== Whip ====
- Government: Masiung Banah (Kuamut MLA)

== Current composition ==
Government + Confidence & Supply (53)										Opposition (26)
GRS				BN		PH	STAR	PN	IND	WARISAN	KDM
36				6		2	2	1	6	25	1
25	7	3	1	5	1	2	2	1	6	25	1
GAGASAN	PBS	UPKO	LDP	UMNO	PBRS	PKR	STAR	PAS	IND	WARISAN	KDM

No.	Parliamentary constituency	No.	State Constituency	Member	Coalition (Party)	Position
P167	Kudat	N01	Banggi	Mohammad Mohamarin	GRS (GAGASAN)	
P167	Kudat	N02	Bengkoka	Harun Durabi	BN (UMNO)	
P167	Kudat	N03	Pitas	Ruddy Awah	GRS (GAGASAN)	Assistant Minister
P167	Kudat	N04	Tanjong Kapor	Ben Chong Chen Bin	GRS (GAGASAN)	Assistant Minister
P168	Kota Marudu	N05	Matunggong	Julita Majungki	GRS (PBS)	Minister
P168	Kota Marudu	N06	Bandau	Maijol Mahap	Independent	Assistant Minister
P168	Kota Marudu	N07	Tandek	Hendrus Anding	GRS (PBS)	Assistant Minister
P169	Kota Belud	N08	Pintasan	Fairuz Renddan	Independent	Assistant Minister
P169	Kota Belud	N09	Tempasuk	Mohd Arsad Bistari	GRS (GAGASAN)	
P169	Kota Belud	N10	Usukan	Isnaraissah Munirah Majilis	WARISAN	MP of Kota Belud
P169	Kota Belud	N11	Kadamaian	Ewon Benedick	GRS (UPKO)	Deputy Chief Minister; MP of Penampang
P170	Tuaran	N12	Sulaman	Hajiji Noor	GRS (GAGASAN)	Chief Minister
P170	Tuaran	N13	Pantai Dalit	Jasnih Daya	GRS (GAGASAN)	
P170	Tuaran	N14	Tamparuli	Wilfred Madius Tangau	GRS (UPKO)	MP of Tuaran
P170	Tuaran	N15	Kiulu	Joniston Bangkuai	GRS (PBS)	Assistant Minister
P171	Sepanggar	N16	Karambunai	Aliakbar Gulasan	PN (PAS)	
P171	Sepanggar	N17	Darau	Azhar Matussin	WARISAN	
P171	Sepanggar	N18	Inanam	Edna Jessica Majimbun	WARISAN	
P172	Kota Kinabalu	N19	Likas	Tham Yun Fook	WARISAN	
P172	Kota Kinabalu	N20	Api-Api	Loi Kok Liang	WARISAN	
P172	Kota Kinabalu	N21	Luyang	Samuel Wong Tshun Chuen	WARISAN	
P173	Putatan	N22	Tanjung Aru	Junz Wong Hong Jun	WARISAN	
P173	Putatan	N23	Petagas	Awang Ahmad Sah Awang Sahari	Independent	
P173	Putatan	N24	Tanjung Keramat	Shah Alfie Yahya	GRS (GAGASAN)	
P174	Penampang	N25	Kapayan	Chin Tek Ming	WARISAN	
P174	Penampang	N26	Moyog	Donald Peter Mojuntin	GRS (UPKO)	
P175	Papar	N27	Limbahau	Juil Nuatim	GRS (PBS)	Assistant Minister
P175	Papar	N28	Kawang	Gulamhaidar @ Yusof Khan Bahadar	GRS (GAGASAN)	
P175	Papar	N29	Pantai Manis	Pengiran Saifuddin Pengiran Tahir	GRS (GAGASAN)	
P176	Kimanis	N30	Bongawan	Daud Yusof	WARISAN	
P176	Kimanis	N31	Membakut	Mohd Arifin Mohd Arif	GRS (GAGASAN)	Minister
P177	Beaufort	N32	Klias	Isnin Aliasnih	GRS (GAGASAN)	Assistant Minister
P177	Beaufort	N33	Kuala Penyu	Limus Jury	GRS (GAGASAN)	Assistant Minister
P178	Sipitang	N34	Lumadan	Ruslan Muharam	GRS (PBS)	Assistant Minister
P178	Sipitang	N35	Sindumin	Yusri Pungut	WARISAN	
P179	Ranau	N36	Kundasang	Joachim Gunsalam	GRS (PBS)	Deputy Chief Minister
P179	Ranau	N37	Karanaan	Masidi Manjun	GRS (GAGASAN)	Deputy Chief Minister
P179	Ranau	N38	Paginatan	Rusdin Riman	KDM	
P180	Keningau	N39	Tambunan	Jeffrey Kitingan	STAR	MP of Keningau
P180	Keningau	N40	Bingkor	Mohd Ishak Ayub	STAR	Assistant Minister
P180	Keningau	N41	Liawan	Nik Mohd Nadzri Nik Zawawi	BN (UMNO)	
P181	Tenom	N42	Melalap	Jamawi Ja'afar	PH (PKR)	Minister
P181	Tenom	N43	Kemabong	Rubin Balang	GRS (GAGASAN)	Minister
P182	Pensiangan	N44	Tulid	Jordan Jude Ellron	Independent	Assistant Minister
P182	Pensiangan	N45	Sook	Arthur Joseph Kurup	BN (PBRS)	Federal Minister; MP of Pensiangan
P182	Pensiangan	N46	Nabawan	Abdul Ghani Mohamed Yassin	GRS (GAGASAN)	
P183	Beluran	N47	Telupid	Jonnybone J Kurum	GRS (PBS)	Assistant Minister
P183	Beluran	N48	Sugut	James Ratib	GRS (GAGASAN)	Minister
P183	Beluran	N49	Labuk	Samad Jambri	GRS (GAGASAN)	Assistant Minister
P184	Libaran	N50	Gum-Gum	Arunarnsin Taib	WARISAN	
P184	Libaran	N51	Sungai Manila	Hazem Mubarak Musa	GRS (GAGASAN)	
P184	Libaran	N52	Sungai Sibuga	Nurulalsah Hassan Alban	WARISAN	
P185	Batu Sapi	N53	Sekong	Alias Sani	WARISAN	
P185	Batu Sapi	N54	Karamunting	Alex Wong Tshun Khee	WARISAN	
P186	Sandakan	N55	Elopura	Calvin Chong Ket Kiun	WARISAN	
P186	Sandakan	N56	Tanjong Papat	Alex Thien Ching Qiang	WARISAN	
P187	Kinabatangan	N57	Kuamut	Masiung Banah	GRS (GAGASAN)	
P187	Kinabatangan	N58	Lamag	Mohd Ismail Ayob	BN (UMNO)	
P187	Kinabatangan	N59	Sukau	Jafry Ariffin	BN (UMNO)	Minister
P188	Lahad Datu	N60	Tungku	Assaffal P. Alian	WARISAN	
P188	Lahad Datu	N61	Segama	Muhammad Abdul Karim	WARISAN	
P188	Lahad Datu	N62	Silam	Yusof Apdal	WARISAN	Federal Deputy Minister; MP of Lahad Datu
P188	Lahad Datu	N63	Kunak	Anil Sandhu	BN (UMNO)	Assistant Minister
P189	Semporna	N64	Sulabayan	Jaujan Sambakong	WARISAN	
P189	Semporna	N65	Senallang	Shafie Apdal	WARISAN	Opposition Leader; MP of Semporna
P189	Semporna	N66	Bugaya	Jamil Hamzah	WARISAN	
P190	Tawau	N67	Balung	Syed Ahmad Syed Abas	GRS (GAGASAN)	
P190	Tawau	N68	Apas	Nizam Abu Bakar Titingan	GRS (GAGASAN)	Minister
P190	Tawau	N69	Sri Tanjong	Justin Wong Yung Bin	WARISAN	
P191	Kalabakan	N70	Kukusan	Rina Jainal	Independent	Assistant Minister
P191	Kalabakan	N71	Tanjung Batu	Andi Md Shamsureezal Mohd Sainal	GRS (GAGASAN)	Assistant Minister
P191	Kalabakan	N72	Merotai	Sarifuddin Hata	WARISAN	
P191	Kalabakan	N73	Sebatik	Manahing Tinggilani	WARISAN	
Nominated Member				Ceasar Mandela Malakun	GRS (GAGASAN)	Assistant Minister
Nominated Member				Mohamed Razali Mohamed Razi	GRS (GAGASAN)	
Nominated Member				Abdul Kassim Razali	GRS (GAGASAN)	
Nominated Member				Chin Shu Ying	GRS (LDP)	
Nominated Member				Grace Lee Li Mei	PH (PKR)	
Nominated Member				Roger Chin Ken Fong	Independent	

== Seating plan ==
Vacant	N67 Balung	Vacant		D	Sergeant-at-Arm	C		Vacant	Vacant	Vacant
Vacant	N58 Lamag	N23 Petagas	N01 Banggi	D		C	Vacant	Vacant	Vacant	Vacant
Grace Lee Li Mei	N51 Sungai Manila	N14 Tamparuli	N57 Kuamut	D		C	Vacant	Vacant	Vacant	Vacant
Roger Chin Ken Fong	N41 Liawan	N46 Nabawan	N28 Kawang	D		C	Vacant	Vacant	Vacant	Vacant
			N26 Moyog	D		C	N05 Matunggong (Minister)
Mohamed Razali Mohamed Razi	N16 Karambunai	N13 Pantai Dalit	N39 Tambunan	E		B	N68 Apas (Minister)	N07 Tandek (Assistant Minister)	Vacant	Vacant
Abdul Kassim Razali	N29 Pantai Manis	N09 Tempasuk	N45 Sook	E		B	N59 Sukau (Minister)	N49 Labuk (Assistant Minister)	Vacant	Vacant
Chin Shu Ying	N24 Tanjung Keramat	N09 Tempasuk	N45 Sook	E		B	N59 Sukau (Minister)	N49 Labuk (Assistant Minister)	Vacant	Vacant
Vacant	Vacant	N02 Bengkoka	Vacant	E	the Mace	B	N42 Melalap (Minister)	N44 Tulid (Assistant Minister)	N63 Kunak (Assistant Minister)	Vacant
Vacant	Vacant	Vacant	Vacant	E	the Mace	B	N43 Kemabong (Minister)	N08 Pintasan (Assistant Minister)	N63 Kunak (Assistant Minister)	Vacant
N38 Paginatan	N25 Kapayan	N66 Bugaya	N50 Gum-Gum	E		B	N48 Sugut (Minister)	N47 Telupid (Assistant Minister)	N34 Lumadan (Assistant Minister)	Vacant
N73 Sebatik	N21 Luyang	N66 Bugaya	N50 Gum-Gum	E		B	N48 Sugut (Minister)	N47 Telupid (Assistant Minister)	N70 Kukusan (Assistant Minister)	Vacant
N61 Segama	N20 Api-Api	N62 Silam	N17 Darau	E		B	N31 Membakut (Minister)	N40 Bingkor (Assistant Minister)	N71 Tanjung Batu (Assistant Minister)	Vacant
			N30 Bongawan	F		A	N11 Kadamaian (Deputy Chief Minister III)
N56 Tanjong Papat	N19 Likas	N53 Sekong	N64 Sulabayan	F		A	N37 Karanaan (Deputy Chief Minister II)	N33 Kuala Penyu (Assistant Minister)	N27 Limbahau (Assistant Minister)	Vacant
N54 Karamunting	N18 Inanam	N55 Elopura	N22 Tanjung Aru	F		A	N36 Kundasang (Deputy Chief Minister I)	Ceasar Mandela Malakun (Assistant Minister)	N06 Bandau (Assistant Minister)	Vacant
N52 Sungai Sibuga	N10 Usukan	N72 Merotai	N65 Senallang (Opposition Leader)	F		A	N12 Sulaman (Chief Minister)	N32 Klias (Assistant Minister)	N04 Tanjong Kapor (Assistant Minister)	Vacant
N35 Sindumin	N69 Sri Tanjong	N60 Tungku		F	Secretary	A		N15 Kiulu (Assistant Minister)	N03 Pitas (Assistant Minister)	Vacant
					Speaker
					Yang Di-Pertua Negeri

=== Changes in composition ===
Date	GRS	BN	UPKO	PH	KDM	WARISAN	STAR		PN	IND	Vacant	Government
29 November 2025	29	6	3	1	1	25	2		1	5	0	44
2 December 2025	▲ (Note: Nominated assemblymen.) 33	6	3	▲ (Note: Nominated assemblymen.) 2	1	25	▲ (Note: Bingkor MLA supported GRS government.) 1	▼1	1	▲ (Note: Nominated assemblymen.) 6	0	52
4 December 2025	33	▼5	3	2	1	25	1	1	1	6	▲ (Note: The Lamag seat is vacated following the death of the incumbent Bung Moktar Radin, triggering the 2026 Lamag by-election.) 1	51
11 December 2025	33	▼5	3	2	1	25	2 (Note: STAR joined GRS government)		1 (Note: PN joined GRS government)	6	1	53
24 January 2026	33	▲ (Note: 2026 Lamag by-election – BN holds.); 6	3	2	1	25	2		1	6	▼0	54
18 June 2026	▲ (Note: UPKO joined GRS.) 36	6	▼0	2	1	25	2		1	6	0	54
15 August 2026	36	6	0	2	1 (Note: KDM left the GRS government.)	25	2		1	6	0	53
