= Kota Kinabalu District =

Kota Kinabalu District Daerah Kota Kinabalu
- District
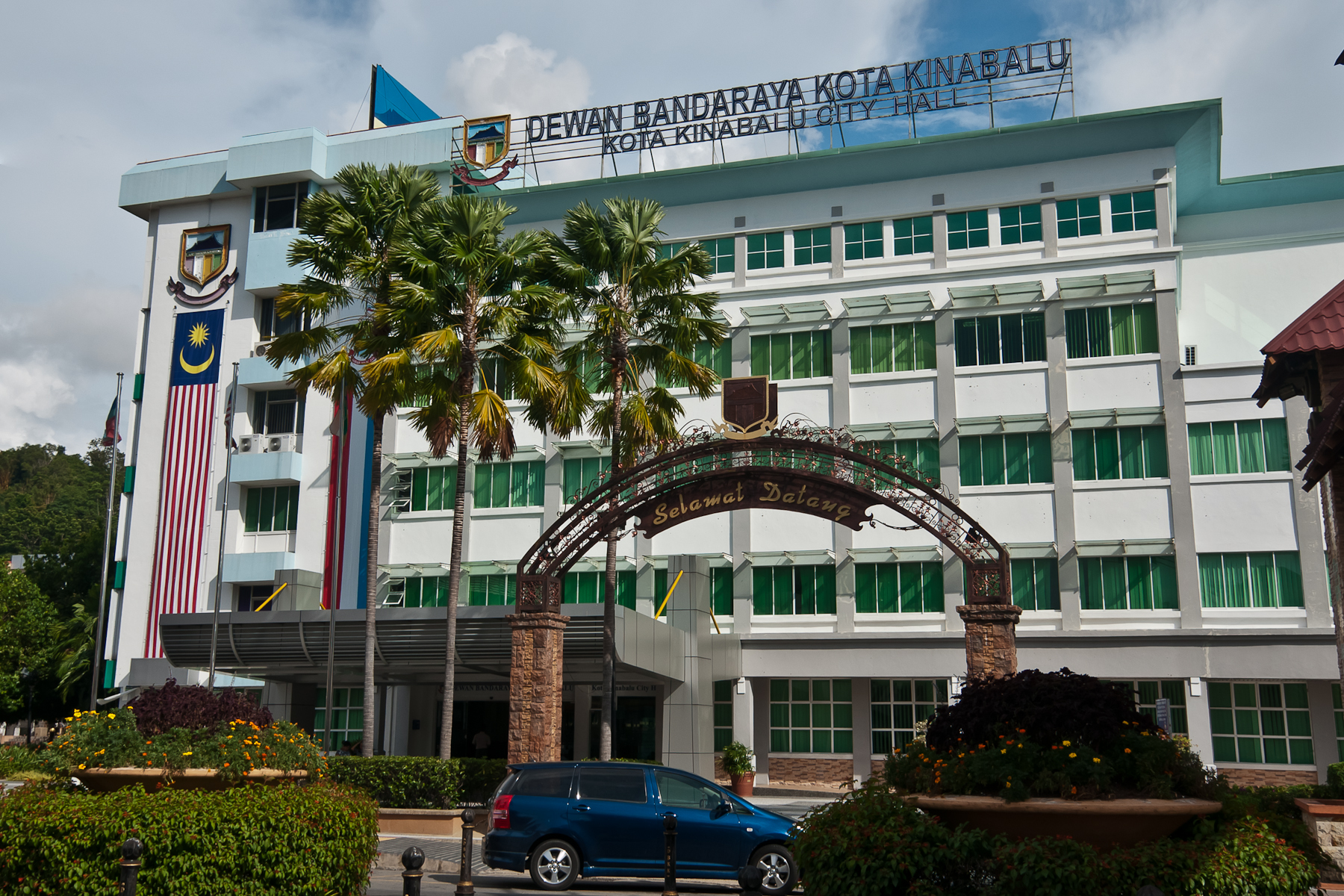
- Kota Kinabalu City Hall.

- Flag Seal

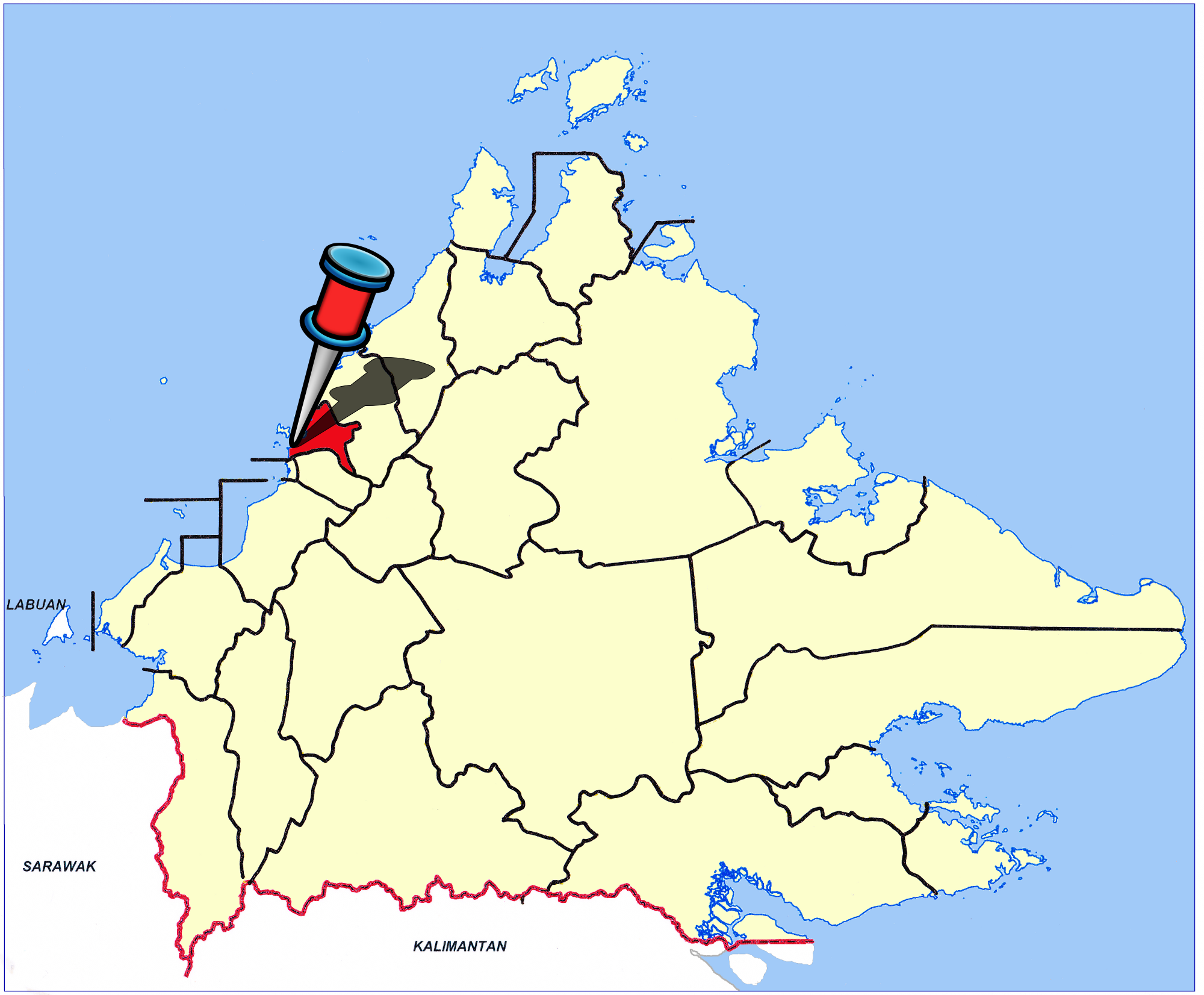
- Coordinates: 5°58′13″N 116°04′14″E
- Country: Malaysia
- State: Sabah
- Division: West Coast
- Capital: Kota Kinabalu

Government
  - Mayor of City Council: Datuk Dr. Sabin Samitah
  - MP: Wilfred Madius Tangau (UPKO) (Tuaran); Mustapha Sakmud (PKR) (Sepanggar); Chan Foong Hin (DAP) (Kota Kinabalu); Shahelmey Yahya (UMNO) (Putatan); Ewon Benedick (UPKO) (Penampang)
  - MLA: Yakub Khan (UMNO-BN) (Karambunai); Peto Galim (PH-PKR) (Inanam); Tan Lee Fatt (PH-DAP) (Likas); Christina Liew (PH-PKR) (Api-Api); Azhar Matussin (WARISAN) (Darau); Phoong Jin Zhe (PH-DAP) (Luyang); Jasnih Daya (GRS) (Pantai Dalit); Junz Wong Hong Jun (WARISAN) (Tanjung Aru); Jannie Lasimbang (PH-DAP) (Kapayan)

Area
  - Total: 352 km^{2} (136 sq mi)

Population (2020)
  - Total: 500,425
  - Density: 1,420/km^{2} (3,680/sq mi)
- Website: dbkk.sabah.gov.my

Map of Kota Kinabalu District

The Kota Kinabalu District (Malay: Daerah Kota Kinabalu) is an administrative district in the Malaysian state of Sabah, part of the West Coast Division which includes the districts of Kota Belud, Kota Kinabalu, Papar, Penampang, Ranau and Tuaran. The capital of the district is in Kota Kinabalu City.

== Demographics ==
Historical population
Year	Pop.	±%
1991	209,175	—
2000	355,435	+69.9%
2010	452,058	+27.2%
2020	500,421	+10.7%

According to the 2020 census, the population of the district was 500,421. The main ethnic groups were the Chinese (20%), Kadazan-Dusun (15%), Bajaus (16%), Malays (8%) and Muruts (6%). As in most other parts of Sabah, there was also a significant number of illegal immigrants from the southern Philippines - mainly from the Sulu Archipelago and Mindanao - many of whom are not included in the population statistics.

== Gallery ==
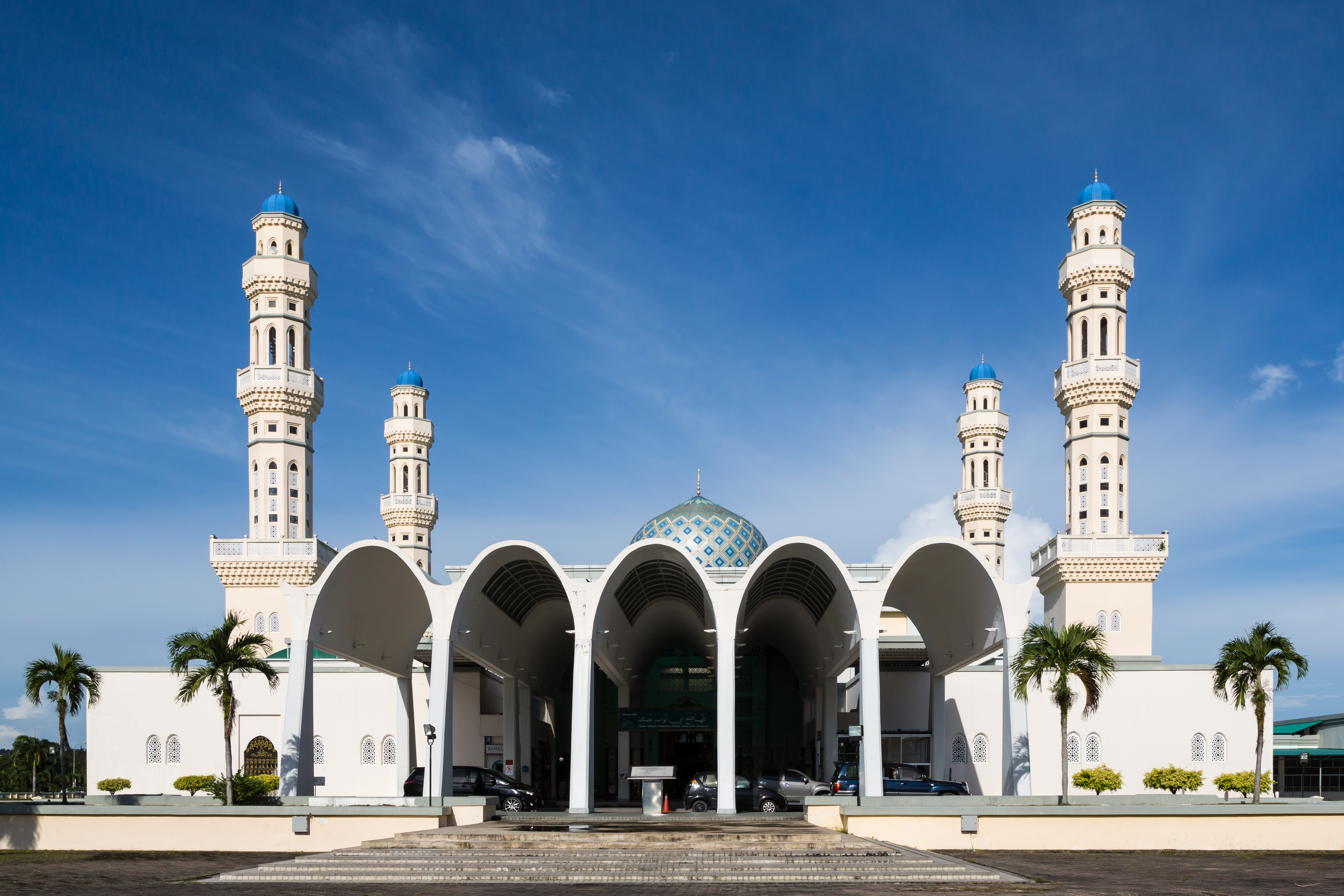
Kota Kinabalu City Mosque.

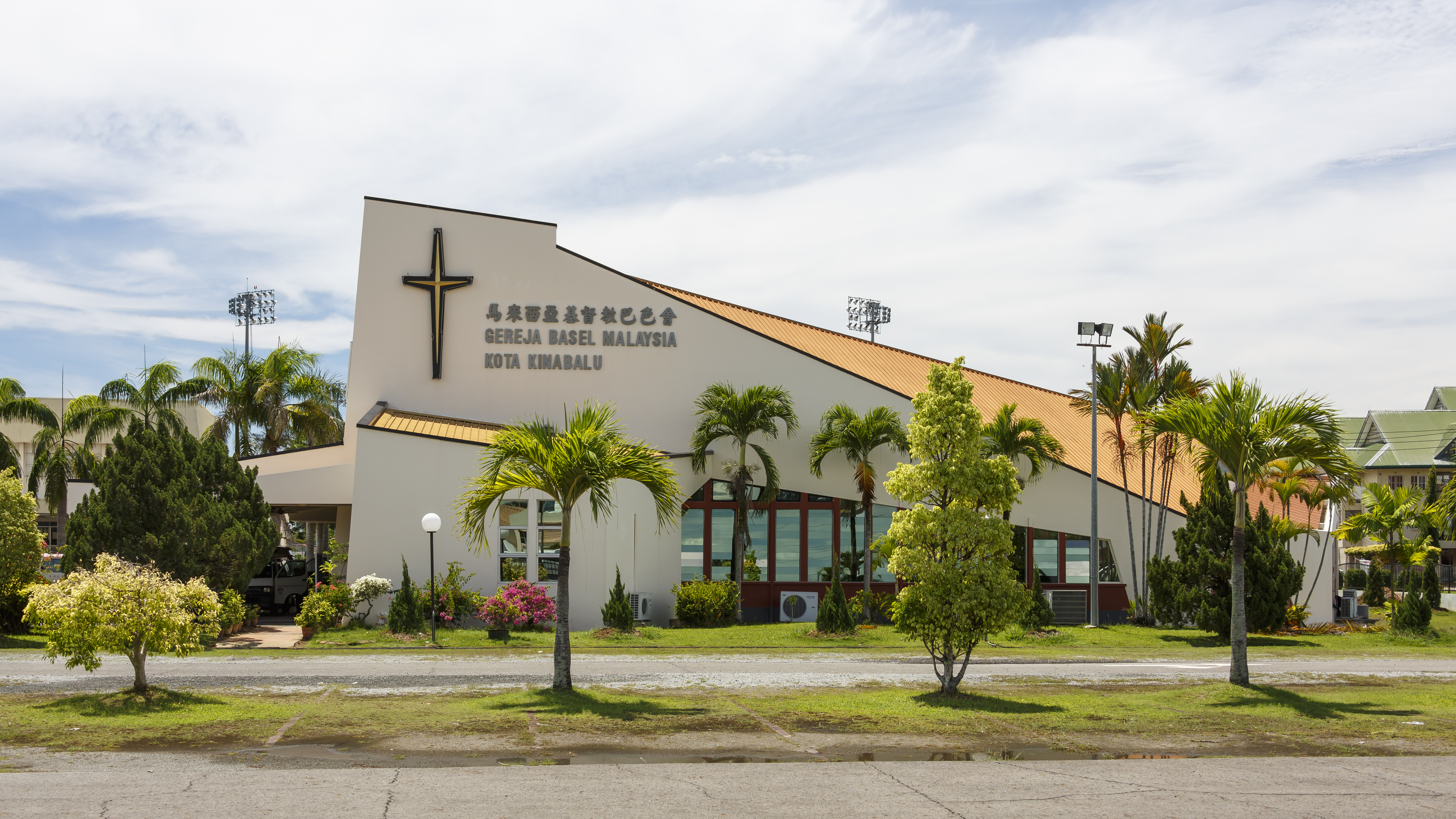
Kota Kinabalu Basel Church.

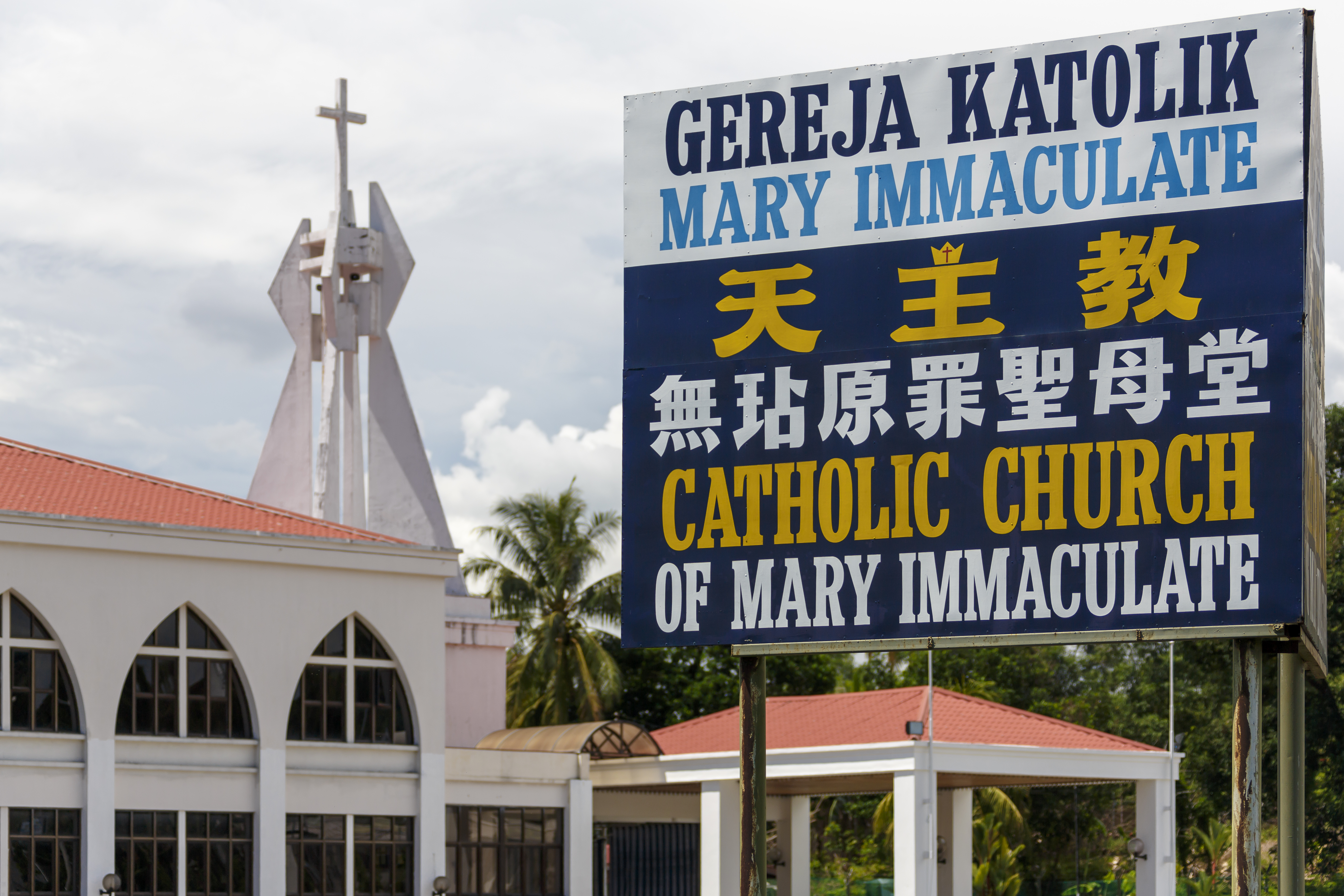
Mary Immaculate Catholic Church.

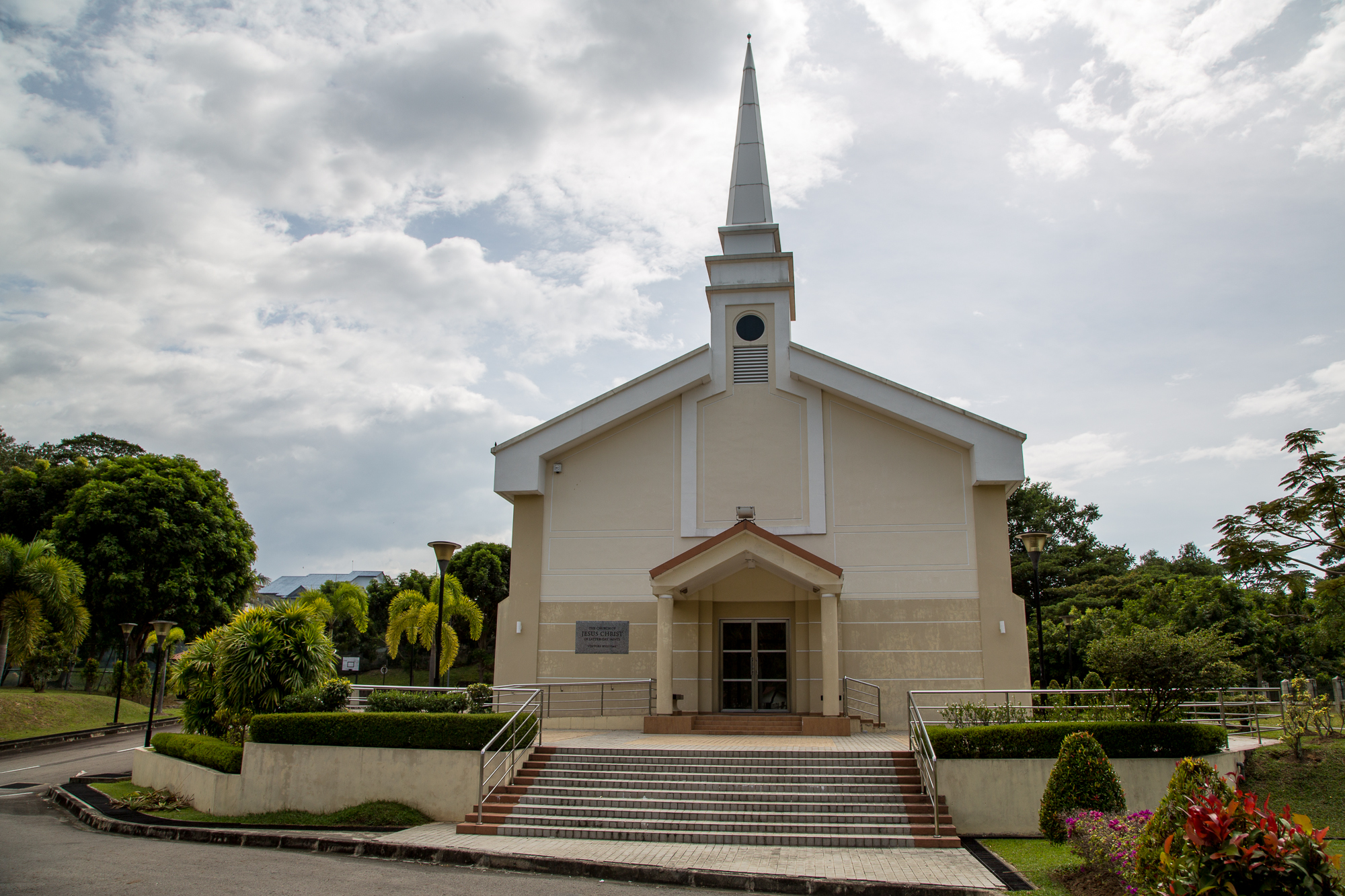
Kota Kinabalu Latter Day Saint Church.

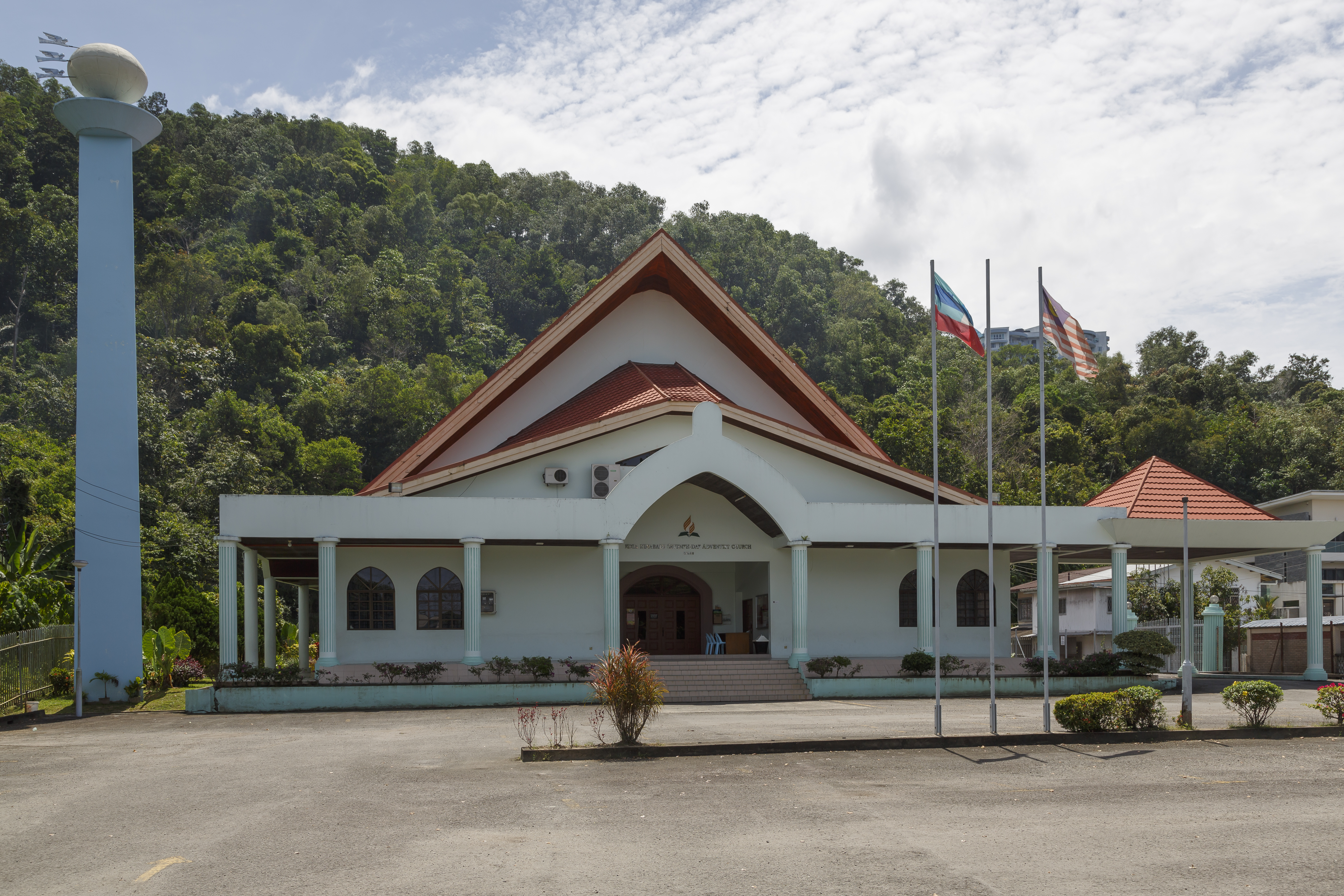
Kota Kinabalu Seventh Day Adventist Church.

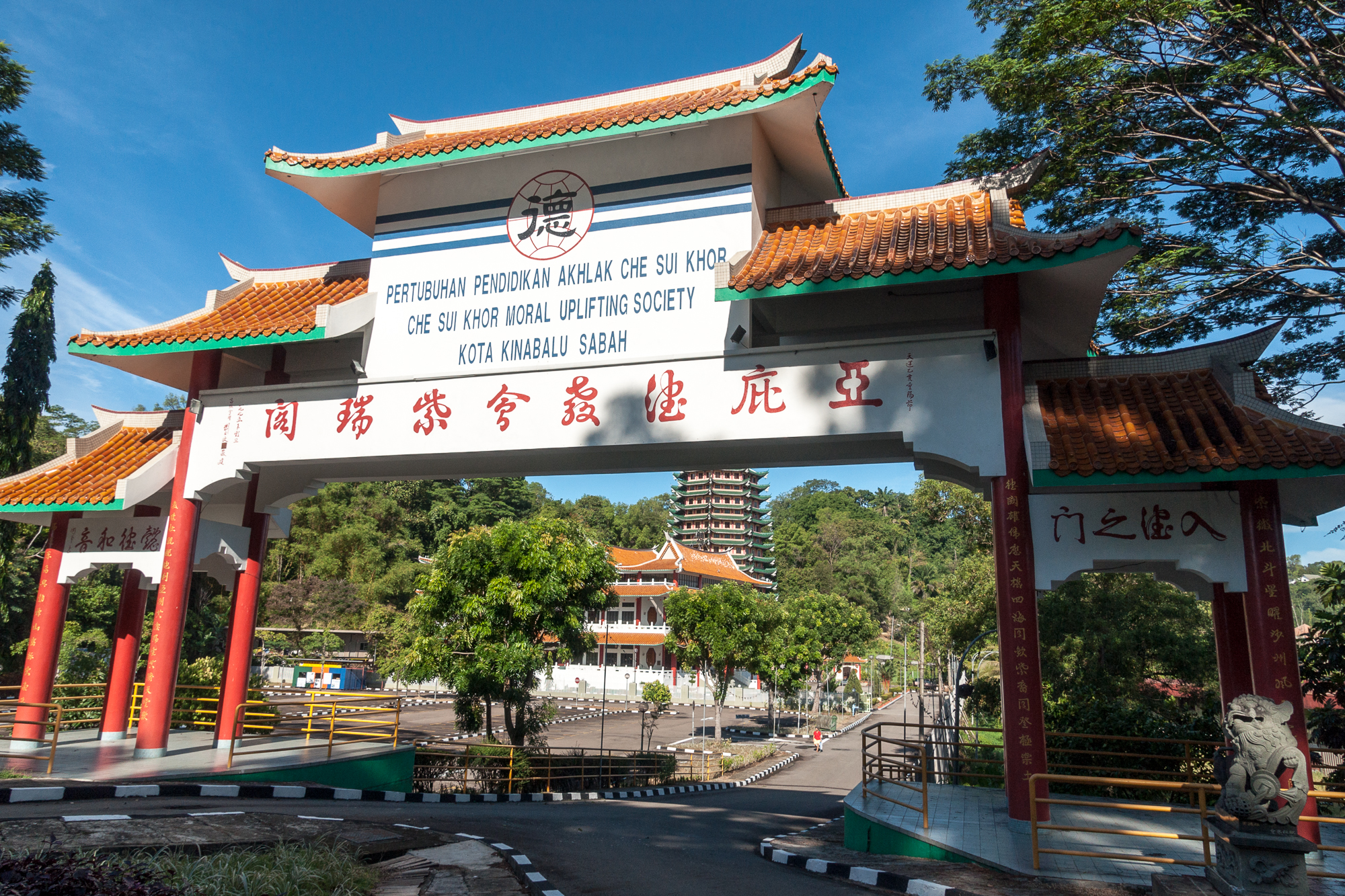
Che Sui Khor Moral Uplifting Society.

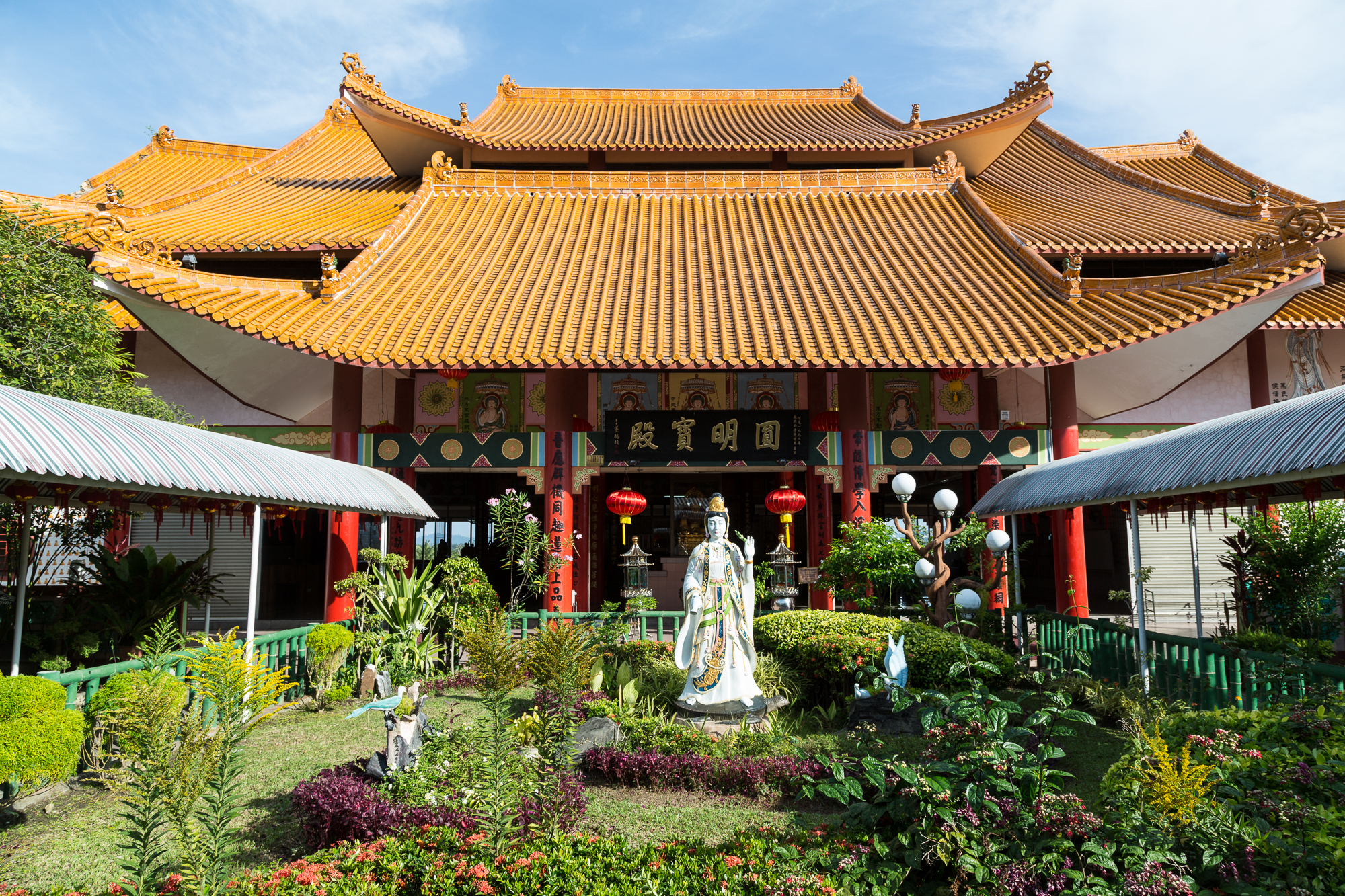
Pu Tuo Si Temple.

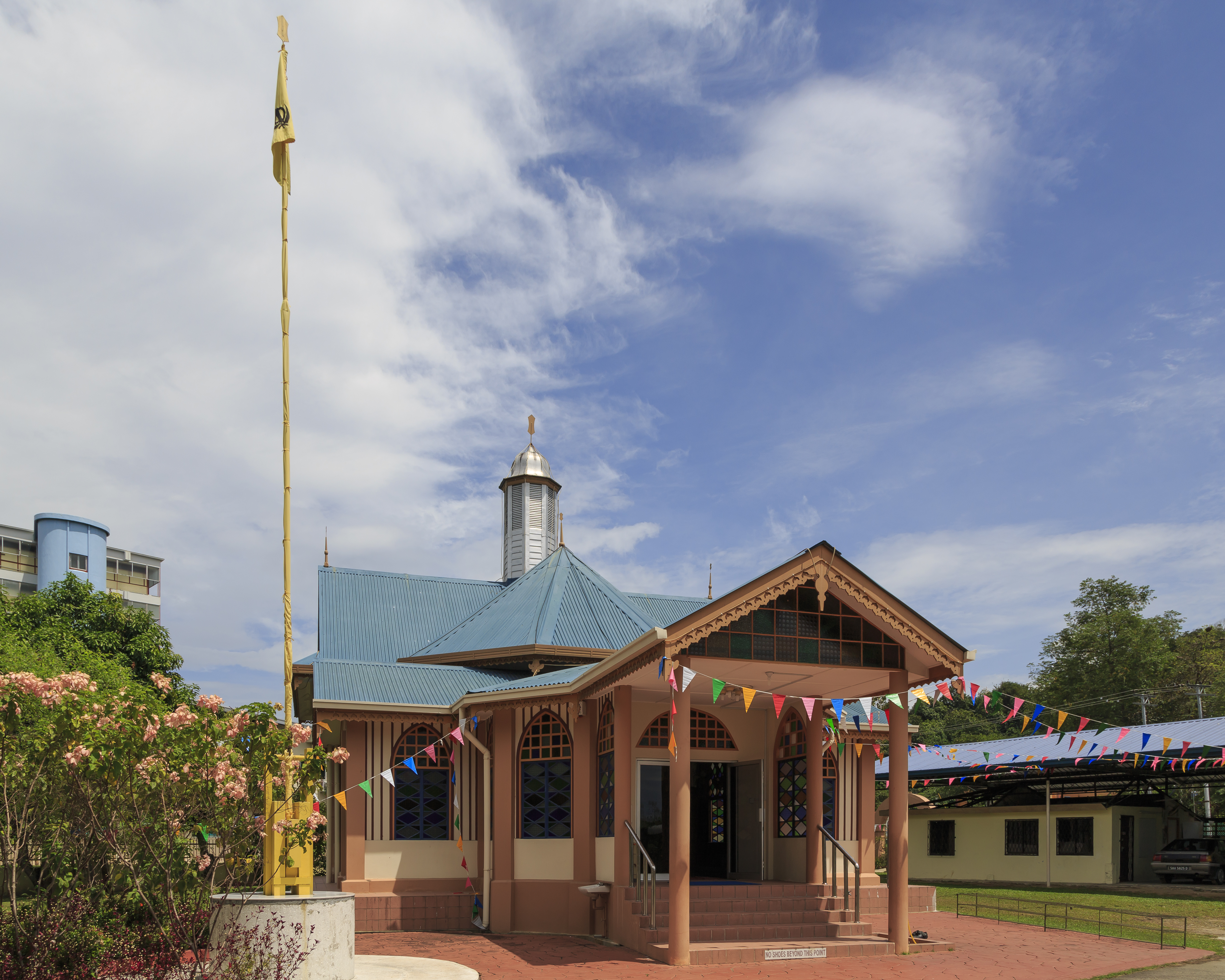
Gurdwara Sahib Kota Kinabalu.

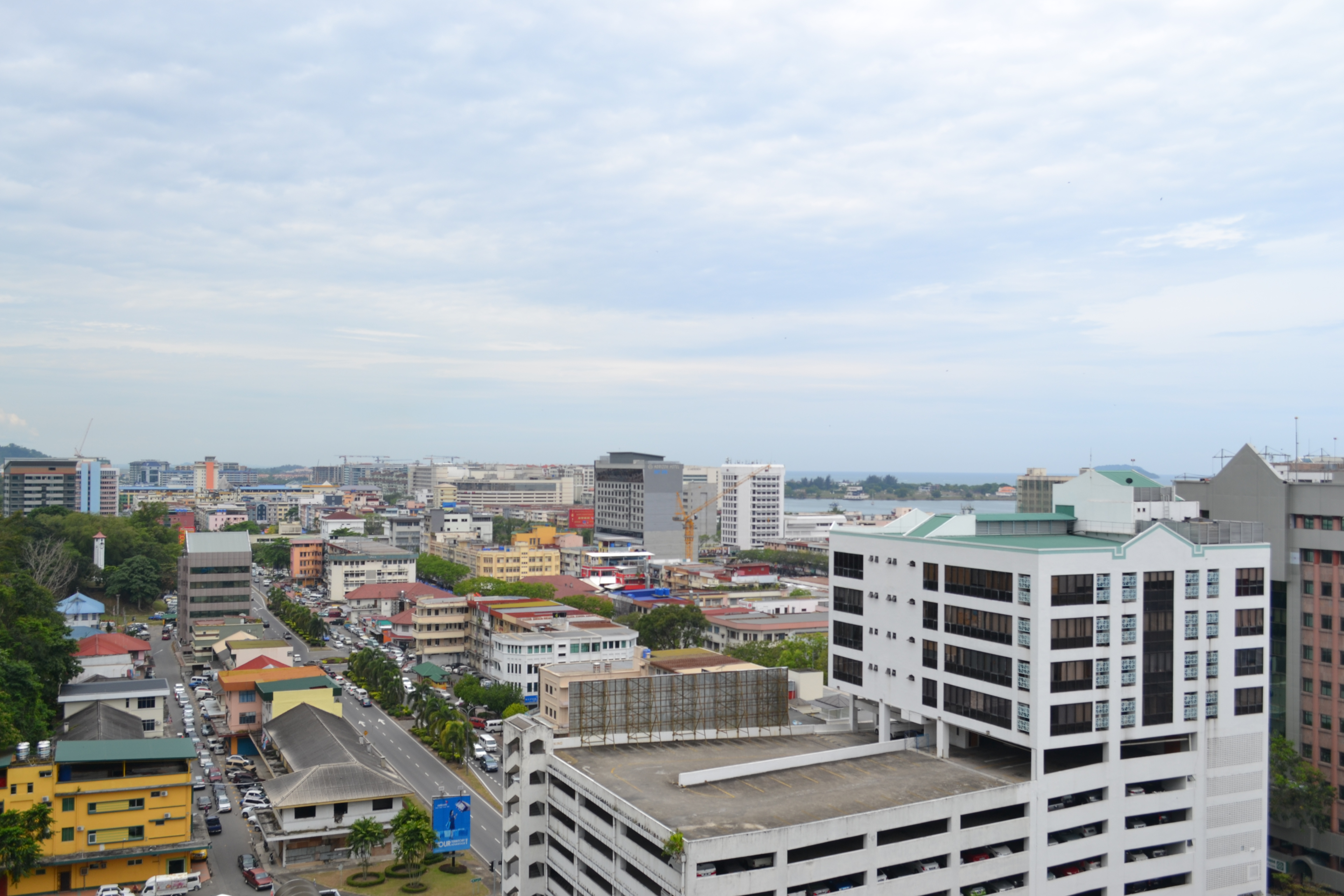
Kota Kinabalu city centre.

== See also ==
- Districts of Malaysia
