= Jainab Ahmad Ayid =

Malaysian politician (born 1953)

Yang Berbahagia Datuk Jainab Ahmad Ayid PGDK

State Minister of Community Development and Consumer Affairs
- In office 10 May 2013 – 9 May 2018
- Governor: Juhar Mahiruddin
- Chief Minister: Musa Aman
- Preceded by: Azizah Mohd Dun
- Succeeded by: Anita Baranting
- Constituency: Karambunai

Member of the Sabah State Legislative Assembly for Karambunai
- In office 21 March 2004 – 9 May 2018
- Preceded by: Constituency created
- Succeeded by: Azhar Matussin (WARISAN)
- Majority: 2,526 (2004); 3,018 (2008); 9,276 (2013)

Personal details
- Born: Jainab binti Ahmad; 22 July 1953 (age 73) Tawau, Crown Colony of North Borneo (now Sabah, Malaysia)
- Party: United Malays National Organisation (UMNO)
- Other political affiliations: Barisan Nasional (BN)
- Children: 2
- Education: Universiti Malaysia Sabah
- Occupation: Politician

Jainab binti Ahmad or better known as Jainab Ahmad Ayid (born 22 July 1953) is a Malaysian politician who served as the State Minister of Community Development and Consumer Affairs from May 2013 to May 2018. She served as the Member of Sabah State Legislative Assembly (MLA) for Karambunai from March 2004 to May 2018. She is a member of the United Malays National Organisation (UMNO) a component party of the Barisan Nasional (BN) coalition.

== Election results ==
Sabah State Legislative Assembly
| Year | Constituency | Candidate | Votes | Pct | Opponent(s) | Votes | Pct | Ballots cast | Majority | Turnout |
|---|---|---|---|---|---|---|---|---|---|---|
| 2004 | N12 Karambunai | Jainab Ahmad (UMNO) | 6,360 | 62.39% | Saidatul Badru Mohd Said (KeADILan) | 3,834 | 37.61% | 10,194 | 2,526 | 62.64% |
| 2008 | N12 Karambunai | Jainab Ahmad (UMNO) | 7,914 | 61.78% | Ag. Maidin Ag. Apong (PKR) | 4,896 | 38.22% | 12,810 | 3,018 | 67.24% |
| 2013 | N12 Karambunai | Jainab Ahmad (UMNO) | 14,818 | 65.34% | Muali Aching (PKR) | 5,542 | 24.43% | 22,680 | 9,276 | 80.75% |
| 2013 | N12 Karambunai | Jainab Ahmad (UMNO) | 14,818 | 65.34% | Aziz Ibrahim (SAPP) | 1,977 | 8.72% | 22,680 | 9,276 | 80.75% |
| 2013 | N12 Karambunai | Jainab Ahmad (UMNO) | 14,818 | 65.34% | Rano Susulan (IND) | 172 | 0.76% | 22,680 | 9,276 | 80.75% |
| 2013 | N12 Karambunai | Jainab Ahmad (UMNO) | 14,818 | 65.34% | Ag. Maidin Ag. Apong (IND) | 171 | 0.75% | 22,680 | 9,276 | 80.75% |
| 2018 | N12 Karambunai | Jainab Ahmad (UMNO) | 8,791 | 33.94% | Azhar Matussin (WARISAN) | 14,157 | 54.66% | 25,902 | 5,366 | 77.38% |
| 2018 | N12 Karambunai | Jainab Ahmad (UMNO) | 8,791 | 33.94% | Aspar Oyet @ Akbar (PAS) | 1,696 | 6.55% | 25,902 | 5,366 | 77.38% |
| 2018 | N12 Karambunai | Jainab Ahmad (UMNO) | 8,791 | 33.94% | Ahsim Oyok Jamat (SAPP) | 1,258 | 4.86% | 25,902 | 5,366 | 77.38% |

== Honours ==
- Sabah
  - Commander of the Order of Kinabalu (PGDK) – Datuk (2008)
