= Che Sui Khor Moral Uplifting Society =

Dejiao establishment in Malaysia

Che Sui Khor Moral Uplifting Society 亞庇德教會紫瑞閣
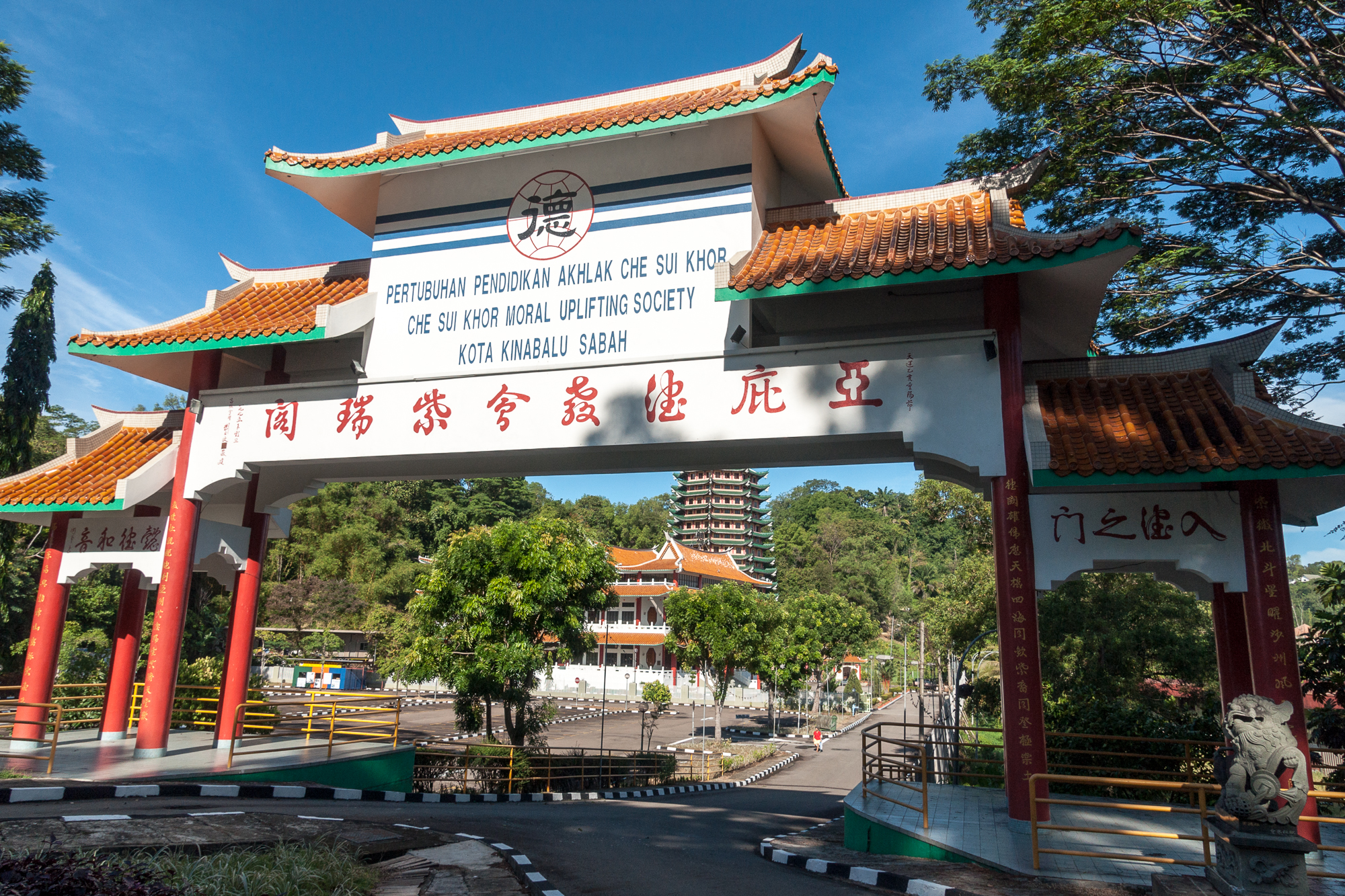
- The centre entrance

Religion
- Affiliation: Buddhism, Taoism
- District: Kota Kinabalu District

Location
- Location: Kota Kinabalu
- State: Sabah
- Country: Malaysia
- Interactive map of Che Sui Khor Moral Uplifting Society 亞庇德教會紫瑞閣
- Coordinates: 5°58′19.8″N 116°04′57.9″E

Architecture
- Type: Chinese temple, pagoda
- Established: 1981

Website
- chesuikhor.jimdo.com

Che Sui Khor Moral Uplifting Society (Chinese: 亞庇德教會紫瑞閣) is a Dejiao establishment located in Kota Kinabalu, Sabah, Malaysia. The centre has been opened since 1981.

== Features ==
The centre feature an assembly hall and an 11-storey pagoda. The pagoda was built in 2001 and completed in 2006 with architecture modelled after the Leifeng Pagoda in Hangzhou, China. Musa Aman, the Chief Minister of Sabah, officiated at its opening. The pagoda was given the nickname "Liu He" which means "peace, prosperity and harmony".

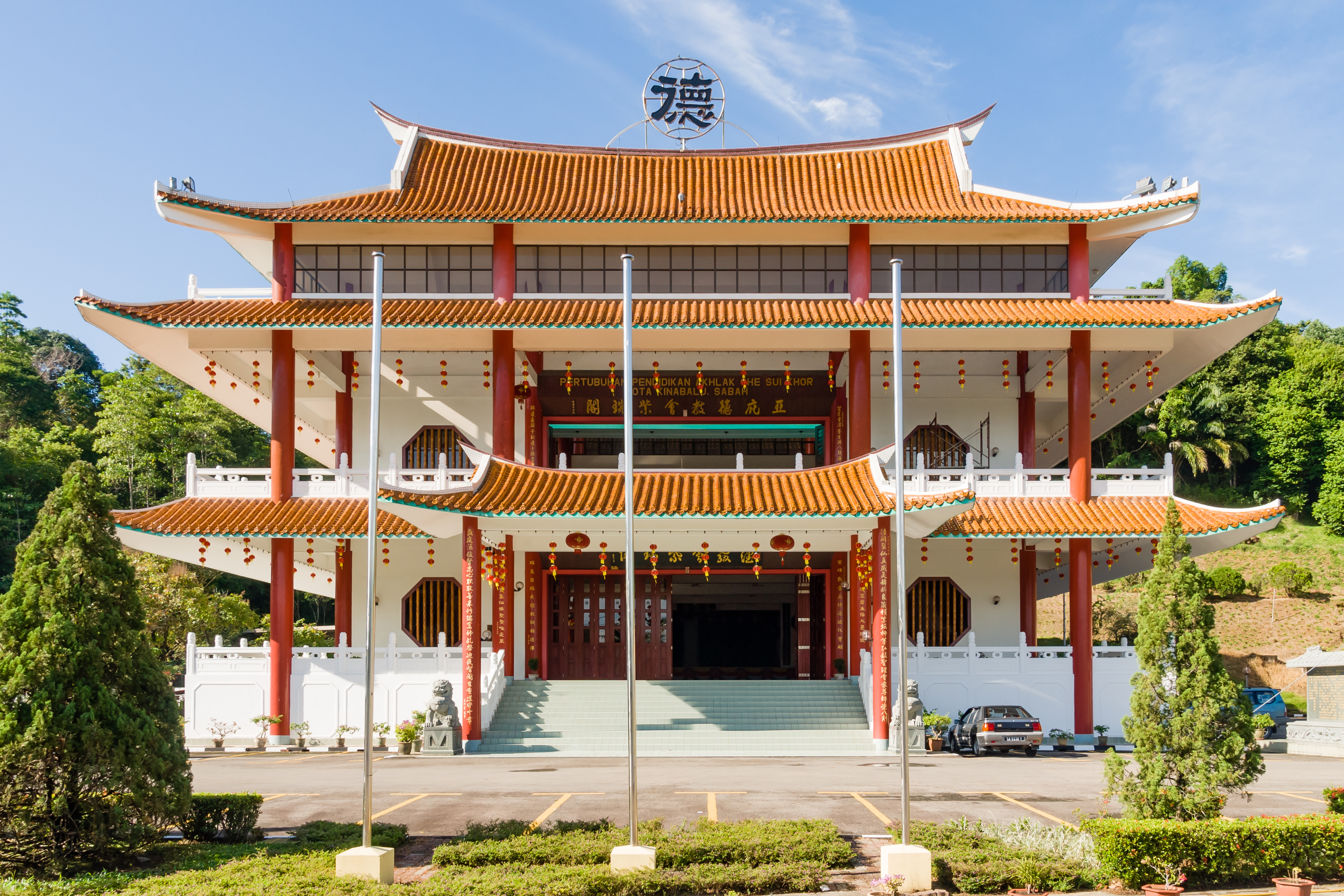
Assembly hall

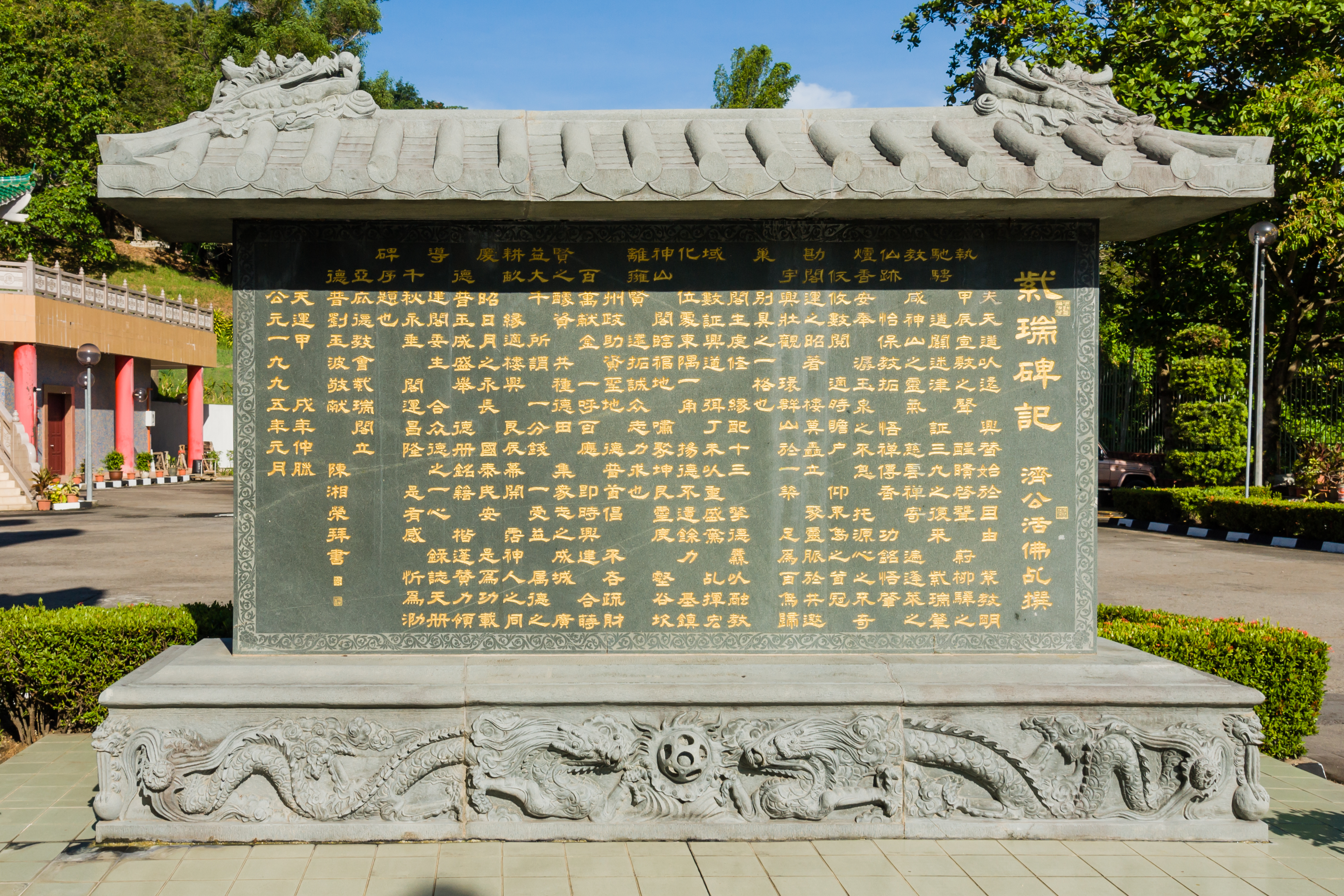
Memorial stone in front of the assembly hall

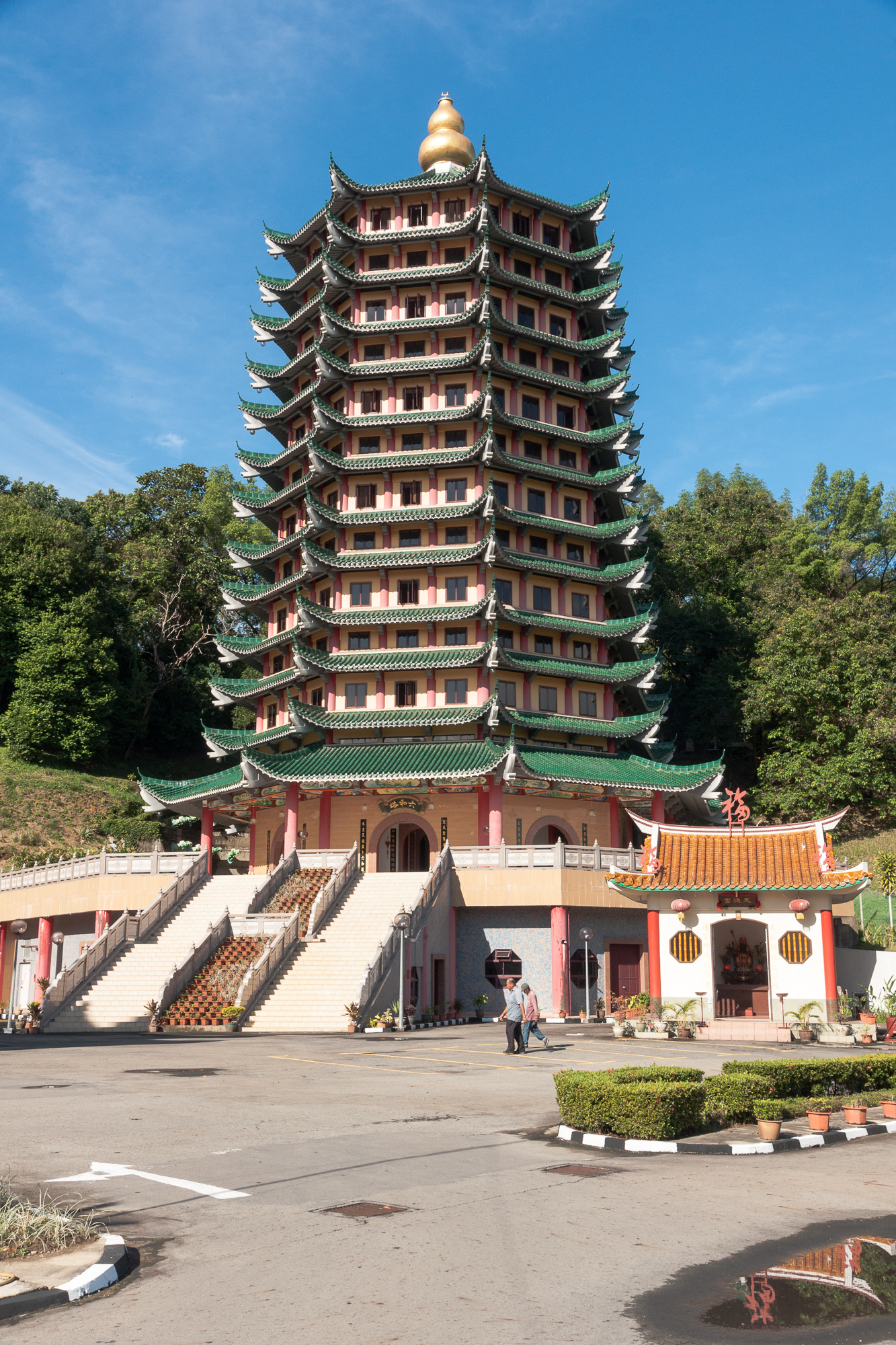
The pagoda seen from far
