= Yakub Khan (politician) =

Malaysian politician

Yang Berbahagia Datuk Yakub Khan PGDK
- يعقوب خان

State Minister of Science, Technology and Innovation of Sabah
- In office 08 October 2020 – 11 January 2023
- Governor: Juhar Mahiruddin
- Chief Minister: Hajiji Noor
- Assistant: Ruddy Awah
- Preceded by: Yusof Yacob (State Minister of Education and Innovation of Sabah)
- Succeeded by: Mohd Arifin Mohd Arif
- Constituency: Karambunai

Member of the Sabah State Legislative Assembly for Karambunai
- In office 26 September 2020 – 29 November 2025
- Preceded by: Azhar Matussin (WARISAN)
- Succeeded by: Aliakbar Gulasan (PAS)
- Majority: 16 (2020)

Senator Appointed by the Yang di-Pertuan Agong
- In office 22 June 2020 – 08 October 2020
- Monarch: Abdullah
- Prime Minister: Muhyiddin Yassin

Faction represented in Sabah State Legislative Assembly
- 2020–2025: Barisan Nasional

Faction represented in Dewan Negara
- 2020: Barisan Nasional

Personal details
- Born: Yakub Khan; 24 November 1961 (age 64) Sepanggar, Jesselton, Crown Colony of North Borneo (now Sabah, Malaysia)
- Citizenship: Malaysian
- Party: United Malays National Organisation (UMNO)
- Other political affiliations: Barisan Nasional (BN)
- Spouse: Salina Mohd Usman
- Occupation: Politician

Yakub Khan (born 24 November 1961) is a Malaysian politician who had served as the Sabah State Minister of Science, Technology and Innovation from 2020 until 2023. He had served as Senator in the Malaysian Parliament from June 2020 until his appointment in Chief Minister Hajiji's cabinet and Member of the Sabah State Legislative Assembly (MLA) for Karambunai since September 2020. He is a member and the Division Chief of Sepanggar of the United Malays National Organisation (UMNO), a component party of the Barisan Nasional (BN) coalition.

== Election results ==
Sabah State Legislative Assembly
| Year | Constituency | Candidate | Votes | Pct | Opponent(s) | Votes | Pct | Ballots cast | Majority | Turnout |
|---|---|---|---|---|---|---|---|---|---|---|
| 2020 | N16 Karambunai | Yakubah Khan (UMNO) | 5,180 | 42.86% | Ahmad Jais Otong (WARISAN) | 5,164 | 42.72% | 12,087 | 16 | 61.79% |
| 2020 | N16 Karambunai | Yakubah Khan (UMNO) | 5,180 | 42.86% | Marajoh Unding (LDP) | 1,053 | 8.71% | 12,087 | 16 | 61.79% |
| 2020 | N16 Karambunai | Yakubah Khan (UMNO) | 5,180 | 42.86% | Dayangku Ayesha Humaira Ak Othman Shah (PCS) | 315 | 2.61% | 12,087 | 16 | 61.79% |
| 2020 | N16 Karambunai | Yakubah Khan (UMNO) | 5,180 | 42.86% | Nerudin Ludah (GAGASAN) | 285 | 2.36% | 12,087 | 16 | 61.79% |
| 2020 | N16 Karambunai | Yakubah Khan (UMNO) | 5,180 | 42.86% | Ibrahim Linggam (USNO Baru) | 90 | 0.74% | 12,087 | 16 | 61.79% |
| 2025 | N16 Karambunai | Yakubah Khan (UMNO) | | % | Aliakbar Gulasan (PAS) | | % | | | |
| 2025 | N16 Karambunai | Yakubah Khan (UMNO) | | % | Arshad Idris (GAGASAN) | | % | | | |
| 2025 | N16 Karambunai | Yakubah Khan (UMNO) | | % | Mentoh Aru (WARISAN) | | % | | | |
| 2025 | N16 Karambunai | Yakubah Khan (UMNO) | | % | Stephen Teo (STAR) | | % | | | |
| 2025 | N16 Karambunai | Yakubah Khan (UMNO) | | % | Adis Jalie (IMPIAN) | | % | | | |
| 2025 | N16 Karambunai | Yakubah Khan (UMNO) | | % | Mohd Yunus Ibrahim (PBK) | | % | | | |

Parliament of Malaysia
| Year | Constituency | Candidate | Votes | Pct | Opponent(s) | Votes | Pct | Ballots cast | Majority | Turnout |
|---|---|---|---|---|---|---|---|---|---|---|
| 2022 | P171 Sepanggar | Yakubah Khan (UMNO) | 19,980 | 28.42% | Mustapha Sakmud (PKR) | 27,022 | 38.44% | 70,304 | 7,042 | 64.87% |
| 2022 | P171 Sepanggar | Yakubah Khan (UMNO) | 19,980 | 28.42% | Azis Jamman (WARISAN) | 18,594 | 26.45% | 70,304 | 7,042 | 64.87% |
| 2022 | P171 Sepanggar | Yakubah Khan (UMNO) | 19,980 | 28.42% | Jumardie Lukman (KDM) | 3,977 | 5.66% | 70,304 | 7,042 | 64.87% |
| 2022 | P171 Sepanggar | Yakubah Khan (UMNO) | 19,980 | 28.42% | Yusof Kunchang (PEJUANG) | 731 | 1.04% | 70,304 | 7,042 | 64.87% |

== Honours ==
- Sabah
  - Commander of the Order of Kinabalu (PGDK) – Datuk (2015)
