= Telupid (state constituency) =

State constituency in Sabah, Malaysia

Telupid (N47)
Sabah constituency

State constituency
- Legislature: Sabah State Legislative Assembly
MLA
Jonnybone Kurum
GRS
- Constituency created: 2019
- First contested: 2020
- Last contested: 2025

Demographics
- Electors (2025): 14,965

Telupid is a state constituency in Sabah, Malaysia, that is represented in the Sabah State Legislative Assembly. This is one of the thirteen new state constituencies as result of approval from state legislative and Dewan Rakyat on 17 July 2019 and presenting for the first time for snap election

== Demographics ==
As of 2020, Telupid has a population of 34,181 people.

Ethnic breakdown of Telupid's electorate as of 2025
1. Non-Muslim Bumiputera (70.0%)
2. Muslim Bumiputera (29.0%)
3. Chinese (0.60%)
4. Other ethnicities (0.40%)

== History ==
=== Polling districts ===
According to the gazette issued on 31 October 2022, the Telupid constituency has a total of 8 polling districts.

State constituency	Polling Districts	Code	Location
Telupid (N47）	Ulu Sapi	183/47/01	SK Ulu Sapi
Telupid (N47）	Lidong	183/47/02	SK Lidong
Telupid (N47）	Nangoh	183/47/03	SK Nangoh; SK Perancangan
Telupid (N47）	Kiabau	183/47/04	SK Kiabau
Telupid (N47）	Barayong	183/47/05	SK Berayung; SK Buis
Telupid (N47）	Wonod	183/47/06	SK Kopuron; SK Wonod
Telupid (N47）	Telupid	183/47/07	SK Pekan Telupid; SK Telupid
Telupid (N47）	Tongkungan	183/47/08	SK Tangkungon

=== Representation history ===
Members of the Legislative Assembly for Telupid
Assembly	No	Years	Member	Party
Constituency created from Labuk
16th	N47	2020–2025	Jonnybone Kurum	GRS (PBS)
17th	N47	2025–present	Jonnybone Kurum	GRS (PBS)

== Election results ==
Sabah state election, 2025
Party	Candidate	Votes	%	∆%
GRS	Jonnybone J Kurum	3,868	37.61	▲37.61
UPKO	Felix Joseph Sitin Saang	2,857	27.78	▼1.12
BN	Benedict Asmat	1,687	16.40	▲16.40
Heritage	Simah Matusip	806	7.84	▲7.84
Homeland Solidarity Party	Jikmariya Muran	345	3.35	▲3.35
Sabah Dream Party	Michael Alok	291	2.83	▲2.83
PN	Jamin Jamri	254	2.47	▲2.47
KDM	Nilis Joseph	125	1.22	▲1.22
PBM	Pagrios @ Petrus Zabang	51	0.50	▲0.50
Total valid votes		10,284		
Total rejected ballots		157		
Unreturned ballots		6		
Turnout		10,447	69.81	▲1.66
Registered electors		14,965		
Majority		1,011	9.83	▼2.69
GRS gain from PBS		Swing		?
Source(s) "RESULTS OF CONTESTED ELECTION AND STATEMENTS OF THE POLL AFTER THE OFFICIAL ADDITION OF VOTES" (PDF).

Sabah state election, 2020
Party	Candidate	Votes	%
PBS	Jonnybone J Kurum	2,266	41.42
UPKO	Felix Joseph Sitin	1,581	28.90
BN	Abdul Wahab Abdul Ghani	1,389	25.39
Love Sabah Party	Jingkoi Luna	68	1.24
LDP	Takun Ladas @ Mohd Johan Sualan Madinal	54	0.99
Sabah People's Unity Party	Rita Cham	19	0.35
Total valid votes		5,358	97.93
Total rejected ballots		94	1.72
Unreturned ballots		19	0.35
Turnout		5,471	68.15
Registered electors		7,862	
Majority		685	12.52
This was a new constituency created.
Source(s) "RESULTS OF CONTESTED ELECTION AND STATEMENTS OF THE POLL AFTER THE OFFICIAL ADDITION OF VOTES".
