= Azhar Matussin =

Malaysian politician (born 1966)

Yang Berhormat Tuan Azhar Matussin ASDK MLA
- ازهر ماتوسّين

State Assistant Minister of Trade and Industry of Sabah
- In office 16 May 2018 – 29 September 2020 Serving with Ben Chong Chen Bin
- Governor: Juhar Mahiruddin
- Chief Minister: Shafie Apdal
- Minister: Wilfred Madius Tangau
- Preceded by: Bolkiah Ismail
- Succeeded by: Mohd Tamin Zainal
- Constituency: Karambunai

Member of the Sabah State Legislative Assembly for Darau
- Incumbent
- Assumed office 26 September 2020
- Preceded by: Position established
- Majority: 562 (2020); 63 (2025)

Member of the Sabah State Legislative Assembly for Karambunai
- In office 9 May 2018 – 26 September 2020
- Preceded by: Jainab Ahmad (BN–UMNO)
- Succeeded by: Yakub Khan (BN–UMNO)
- Majority: 5,366 (2018)

Faction represented in the Sabah State Legislative Assembly
- 2018–: Heritage Party

Personal details
- Born: Azhar bin Matussin; 19 November 1966 (age 59) Beaufort, Sabah, Malaysia
- Party: Heritage Party (WARISAN)
- Spouse: Anita Mohd Shamin
- Children: 3
- Parent: Matussin Ag Damit
- Education: De Montfort University
- Occupation: Politician

Azhar bin Matussin is a Malaysian politician who has served as the State Assistant Minister of Trade and Industry of Sabah in the Heritage Party (WARISAN) state administration under former Chief Minister Shafie Apdal and former Minister Wilfred Madius Tangau from May 2018 to the collapse of the WARISAN state administration in September 2020, as well as Member of the Sabah State Legislative Assembly (MLA) for Darau since September 2020 and MLA for Karambunai from May 2018 to September 2020.

== Election results ==
Sabah State Legislative Assembly
Year	Constituency	Candidate	Votes	Pct	Opponent(s)	Votes	Pct	Ballots cast	Majority	Turnout
2018	N12 Karambunai	Azhar Matussin (WARISAN)	14,157	54.32%	Jainab Ahmad (Sabah UMNO)	6,132	36.50%	26,658	5,366	77.40%
2018	N12 Karambunai	Azhar Matussin (WARISAN)	14,157	54.32%	Aspar Akbar (PAS)	1,696	3.67%	26,658	5,366	77.40%
2018	N12 Karambunai	Azhar Matussin (WARISAN)	14,157	54.32%	Ahsim Oyok Jamat (SAPP)	1,258	2.65%	26,658	5,366	77.40%
2020	N17 Darau	Azhar Matussin (WARISAN)	5,805	48.67%	Jumat Idris (Sabah UMNO)	5,243	43.94%	11,928	562	65.00%
2020	N17 Darau	Azhar Matussin (WARISAN)	5,805	48.67%	Sumali @ Marino Ahmad (LDP)	322	2.70%	11,928	562	65.00%
2020	N17 Darau	Azhar Matussin (WARISAN)	5,805	48.67%	Ansari Abdullah (PCS)	280	2.35%	11,928	562	65.00%
2020	N17 Darau	Azhar Matussin (WARISAN)	5,805	48.67%	Laliman Kemad (USNO Baru)	244	2.05%	11,928	562	65.00%
2020	N17 Darau	Azhar Matussin (WARISAN)	5,805	48.67%	Dasim @ Ricky Jikah (GAGASAN)	34	0.29%	11,928	562	65.00%
2025	N17 Darau	Azhar Matussin (WARISAN)	8,360	39.94%	Mohamed Razali Razi (GAGASAN)	8,297	39.64%	21,107	63	64.37%
2025	N17 Darau	Azhar Matussin (WARISAN)	8,360	39.94%	Arfandy Abdul Rahman (Sabah UMNO)	2,394	11.44%	21,107	63	64.37%
2025	N17 Darau	Azhar Matussin (WARISAN)	8,360	39.94%	Nabila Norsahar (Sabah BERSATU)	1,076	5.14%	21,107	63	64.37%
2025	N17 Darau	Azhar Matussin (WARISAN)	8,360	39.94%	Nordin Thani (KDM)	553	2.64%	21,107	63	64.37%
2025	N17 Darau	Azhar Matussin (WARISAN)	8,360	39.94%	Merlah Osman (IMPIAN)	253	1.21%	21,107	63	64.37%

== Honours ==
- Sabah
  - Companion of the Order of Kinabalu (ASDK) (2018)
