= Darau =

Darau (N17)
Sabah constituency

State constituency
- Legislature: Sabah State Legislative Assembly
MLA
Azhar Matussin
Heritage
- Constituency created: 2019
- First contested: 2020
- Last contested: 2025

Demographics
- Electors (2025): 33,016

Darau is a state constituency in Sabah, Malaysia, that is represented in the Sabah State Legislative Assembly. This is one of the thirteen new state constituencies as result of approval from state legislative and Dewan Rakyat on 17 July 2019 and presenting for the first time for snap election

== Demographics ==
As of 2020, Darau has a population of 64,825 people.

Ethnic breakdown of Darau's electorate as of 2025
1. Muslim Bumiputera (78.0%)
2. Non-Muslim Bumiputera (13.0%)
3. Chinese (8.00%)
4. Other ethnicities (1.00%)

== History ==
=== Polling districts ===
According to the gazette issued on 31 October 2022, the Darau constituency has a total of 8 polling districts.

State constituency	Polling District	Code	Location
Darau (N17)	Likas Baru	171/17/01	Dewan Serbaguna DBKK Likas; Dewan Amil Jaya, DBP Cawangan Sabah
Darau (N17)	Likas Darat	171/17/02	SK Likas
Darau (N17)	Kampong Likas	171/17/03	SA Negeri Kampung Likas Kota Kinabalu
Darau (N17)	Bangka-Bangka	171/17/04	SRS Datuk Simon Fung
Darau (N17)	Kurol Melangi	171/17/05	SMK All Saints
Darau (N17)	Darau	171/17/06	SK Darau
Darau (N17)	Warisan	171/17/07	SMK Inanam
Darau (N17)	Rampayan	171/17/08	Institut Sinaran Kota Kinabalu

=== Representation history ===
Members of the Legislative Assembly for Darau
Assembly	No	Years	Member	Party
Constituency created from Karambunai
16th	N17	2020–2025	Azhar Matussin	WARISAN
17th	N17	2025–present	Azhar Matussin	WARISAN

== Election results ==
Sabah state election, 2025: Darau
Party	Candidate	Votes	%	∆%
Heritage	Azhar Matussin	8,360	39.94	▼7.36
GRS	Mohamed Razali Razi	8,297	39.64	▲39.64
BN	Arfandy Abdul Rahman	2,394	11.44	▼31.28
PN	Nabila Norsahar	1,076	5.14	▲5.14
KDM	Nordin Thani	553	2.64	▲2.64
Sabah Dream Party	Meriah Osman	253	1.21	▲1.21
Total valid votes		20,933		
Total rejected ballots		274		
Unreturned ballots		45		
Turnout		21,252	64.37	▲2.51
Registered electors		33,016		
Majority		63	0.30	▼4.28
Sabah Heritage Party hold		Swing		
Source(s) "RESULTS OF CONTESTED ELECTION AND STATEMENTS OF THE POLL AFTER THE OFFICIAL ADDITION OF VOTES" (PDF).

Sabah state election, 2020: Darau
Party	Candidate	Votes	%
Sabah Heritage Party	Azhar Matussin	5,805	47.30
BN	Jumat Idris	5,243	42.72
LDP	Sumali @ Marino Ahmad	322	2.62
Love Sabah Party	Ansari Abdullah	280	2.28
USNO (Baru)	Laliman Kemad	244	1.99
GAGASAN	Dasim @ Ricky Jikah	34	0.28
Total valid votes		11,926	97.18
Total rejected ballots		312	2.54
Unreturned ballots		32	0.26
Turnout		12,272	66.88
Registered electors		18,350	
Majority		562	4.58
This was a new constituency created.
