= 2020 Sabah state election =

State election in Sabah, Malaysia

- 26 September 2020

All 73 elected seats in the Legislative Assembly 37 seats needed for a majority
- Registered: 1,124,598
- Turnout: 66.61%
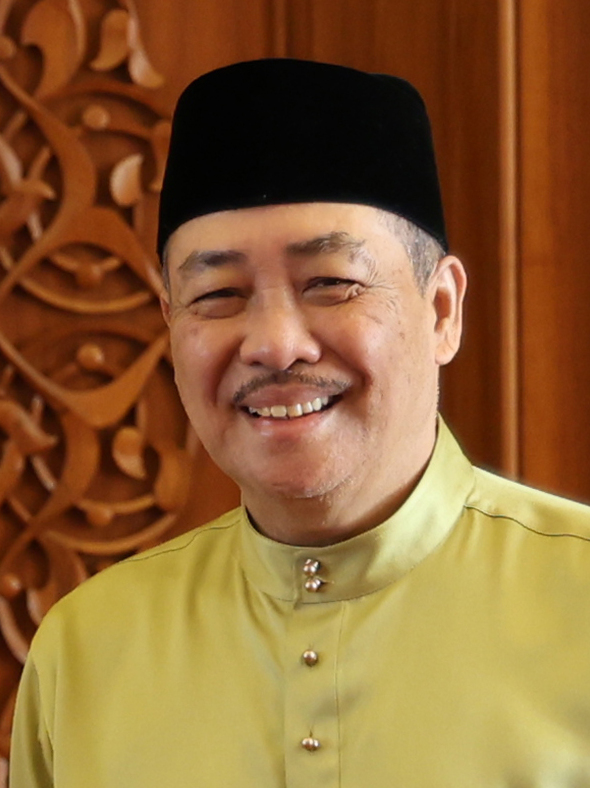

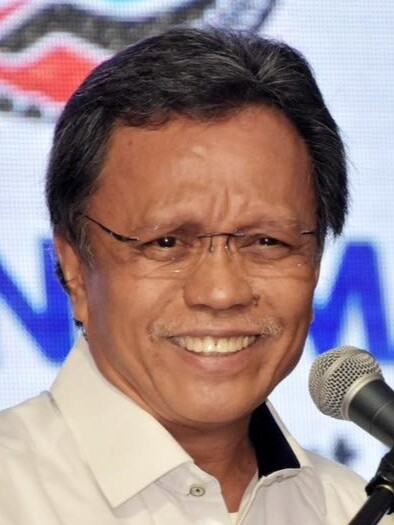
	Majority party	Minority party
Leader	Hajiji Noor	Shafie Apdal
Party	BERSATU Sabah	WARISAN
Alliance	GRS	WARISAN+
Leader since	12 September 2020	17 October 2016
Leader's seat	Sulaman	Senallang
Last election	40.08%, 26 seats (Note: Combined result of Barisan Nasional (excluding UPKO, which left BN and allied with Warisan between elections; Gerakan, which did not contest the election; and LDP, which also left BN and contested independently; 24 seats, 34.92%), STAR (2 seats, 4.59%) and SAPP (0 seats, 0.57%) in the last election. This was Bersatu's first election in Sabah.)	49.78%, 34 seats (Note: Combined result of Warisan (21 seats, 31.30%), Pakatan Harapan (8 seats, 14.63%) and UPKO (5 seats, 3.85%) in the last election. UPKO left BN and allied with Warisan in between elections.)
Seats won	38	32
Seat change	▲12	▼2
Popular vote	316,112	317,991
Percentage	43.22%	43.42%
Swing	▲3.14 pp	▼6.36 pp
- Results by constituency
Chief Minister before election
Shafie Apdal
WARISAN
Elected Chief Minister
Hajiji Noor
GRS Party

The 2020 Sabah state election took place on 26 September 2020 to elect all 73 elected members of the 16th Sabah State Legislative Assembly. The previous Assembly was dissolved on 30 July 2020.

The state snap election was called prematurely after a political crisis arose. Both Shafie Apdal, incumbent Chief Minister and leader of Sabah Heritage Party (WARISAN) and Pakatan Harapan (PH) coalition government and Musa Aman, leader of Perikatan Nasional (PN) and Barisan Nasional (BN) coalition opposition claimed to have the majority to form the government. However, the Governor of Sabah, Juhar Mahiruddin decided to dissolve the State Legislative Assembly on the advice of Shafie.

The state election was conducted under the New Normal and special standard operating procedures (SOP) imposed by the Electoral Commission (EC) as the country is still observing the Recovery Movement Control Order (RMCO) due to COVID-19 pandemic.

Gabungan Rakyat Sabah (GRS) coalition won the election with a simple majority of 38 seats. Hajiji Noor from BERSATU–PN was sworn in as Chief Minister 3 days later. The alliance of Perikatan Nasional with 17 seats, Barisan Nasional with 14 seats, and PBS with 7 seats made GRS the biggest electoral coalition in Sabah since September 2020.

This was the first Sabah state election not held on the same day as the Malaysia general election since 1999, when Sabah held its election on March that year as opposed to the general election date in November 1999.

== Background ==
The 14th general election witnessed 29 seats from the government side and 31 seats from the non-government side filled the State Legislative Assembly. This count, however, did not include six seats from United Progressive Kinabalu Organisation (UPKO) and four from UMNO that switched allegiance from Musa to Shafie. The government side has 11 safe seats and four fairly safe seats, while the non-government side has two safe seats and fivefairly safe seats.

2018 Sabah state election

GOVERNMENT SEATS
Marginal
Melalap	Peter Anthony	WARISAN	46.81
Liawan	Rasinin Kautis	WARISAN	47.75
Banggi	Mohamad Mohamarin	WARISAN	47.79
Petagas	Uda Sulai	WARISAN	47.97
Kunak	Norazlinah Arif	WARISAN	48.20
Tungku	Assaffal P. Alian	WARISAN	49.89
Bongawan	Dr. Daud Yusof	WARISAN	50.62
Gum-Gum	Arunarsin Taib	WARISAN	51.10
Sindumin	Dr. Yusof Yacob	WARISAN	51.90
Merotai	Sarifuddin Hata	WARISAN	51.94
Tanjong Kapor	Ben Chong Chen Bin	WARISAN	54.31
Pantai Manis	Aidi Moktar	WARISAN	54.52
Karambunai	Azhar Matussin	WARISAN	54.66
Lahad Datu	Dumi Pg. Masdal	WARISAN	55.58
Fairly safe
Tanjong Papat	Frankie Poon Ming Fung	DAP	56.20
Tanjong Aru	Junz Wong Hong Jun	WARISAN	56.23
Sekong	Arifin Asgali	WARISAN	56.55
Api-Api	Christina Liew Chin Jin	PKR	57.04
Safe
Moyog	Jenifer Lasimbang	WARISAN	61.39
Inanam	Kenny Chua Teck Ho	PKR	62.33
Karamunting	Hiew Vun Zin	WARISAN	63.67
Elopura	Calvin Chong Ket Kiun	DAP	68.68
Kapayan	Janie Lasimbang	DAP	71.95
Sri Tanjong	Jimmy Wong Sze Phin	DAP	72.00
Sulabayan	Jaujan Sambakong	WARISAN	74.91
Senallang	Mohd. Shafie Apdal	WARISAN	75.97
Bugaya	Manis Buka Mohd. Darah	WARISAN	77.51
Likas	Tan Lee Fatt	DAP	82.57
Luyang	Ginger Phoong Jin Zhe	DAP	84.38

NON-GOVERNMENT SEATS
Marginal
Bingkor	Robert Tawik @ Nordin	STAR	33.19
Kundasang	Joachim Gunsalam	PBS	37.14
Matunggong	Julita Majunki	PBS	41.80
Kiulu	Joniston Bangkuai	PBS	42.39
Pitas	Bolkiah Ismail	UMNO	44.40
Klias	Isnin Aliasnih	UMNO	44.94
Tamparuli	Jahid Jahim	PBS	45.46
Sebatik	Abd. Muis Picho	UMNO	46.70
Tambunan	Dr. Jeffrey Gapari @ Geoffrey Kitingan	STAR	46.78
Balung	Osman Jamal	UMNO	47.08
Kadamaian	Ewon Benedick	UPKO	47.80
Paginatan	Abidin Madingkir	UPKO	48.84
Tempasuk	Musbah Jamli	UMNO	50.82
Tanjong Batu	Hamisa Samat	UMNO	50.92
Tandek	Anita Baranting	PBS	51.21
Usukan	Japlin Akim	UMNO	52.40
Kemabong	Jamawi Ja’afar	UMNO	52.68
Sook	Ellron Alfred Angin	PBRS	53.21
Apas	Nizam Abu Bakar Titingan	UMNO	53.58
Sungai Sibuga	Musa Aman	UMNO	53.59
Labuk	Abd. Rahman Kongkawang	PBS	53.64
Kuala Penyu	Limus Jury	UPKO	54.64
Kawang	Ghulam Haidar Khan Bahadar	UMNO	54.97
Sugut	James Ratib	UPKO	55.77
Fairly safe
Lumadan	Matbali Musah	UMNO	56.65
Membakut	Mohd. Arifin Mohd. Arif	UMNO	57.22
Kuamut	Masiung Banah	UPKO	59.00
Sukau	Saddi Abdu Rahman	UMNO	59.14
Nabawan	Bobbey Ah Fang Suan	UPKO	59.52
Safe
Karanaan	Masidi Manjun	UMNO	63.98
Sulaman	Hajiji Mohd. Noor	UMNO	69.62

== Constituencies ==
13 new seats are added into the existing 60 state constituencies as a result of redelineation of Sabah state constituencies approved by the Dewan Rakyat on 17 July 2019. The new seats are Bengkoka, Bandau, Pintasan, Pantai Dalit, Darau, Tanjung Keramat, Limbahau, Tulid, Telupid, Sungai Manila, Lamag, Segama and Kukusan.

Electoral map of Sabah, showing all 73 constituencies

The 13 new seats for this election

2020 Sabah state election constituencies

Federal seat	No.	Constituency	Electors (2020) (Note: Pink denotes constituencies that are more than 33% from mean value of Sabah electors, while light blue denotes lesser.)	Area (km2)	Density	District	Last election assemblyperson	Last election held party (GE14)	Majority	Current assemblyperson's represent party (2020 SE)
P.167 Kudat	N01	Banggi	5961	621	9.6	Kudat	Mohamad Mohamarin	WARISAN	379	WARISAN
P.167 Kudat	N02	Bengkoka	11543	1011	11.4	Pitas	new seat			
P.167 Kudat	N03	Pitas	10928	454	24.1	Pitas	Bolkiah Ismail	BN (UMNO)	1282	Uncontested
P.167 Kudat	N04	Tanjong Kapor	23700	214	110.7	Kudat	Chong Chen Bin	WARISAN	2992	WARISAN
P.168 Kota Marudu	N05	Matunggong	17111	534	32.0	Kudat	Julita Majungki	BN (PBS)	1687	PN+ (PBS)
P.168 Kota Marudu	N06	Bandau	14615	756	19.3	Kota Marudu	new seat			
P.168 Kota Marudu	N07	Tandek	15971	992	16.1	Kota Marudu	Lasiah Baranting @ Anita	BN (PBS)	4592	PN (STAR) (contesting as independent)
P.169 Kota Belud	N08	Pintasan	10867	300	36.2	Kota Belud	new seat			
P.169 Kota Belud	N09	Tempasuk	11996	159	75.4	Kota Belud	Musbah Jamli	BN (UMNO)	2264	IND
P.169 Kota Belud	N10	Usukan	16883	95	177.7	Kota Belud	Japlin Akim	BN (UMNO)	1225	Uncontested
P.169 Kota Belud	N11	Kadamaian	17968	818	22.0	Kota Belud	Ewon Benedick	BN (UPKO)	3294	WARISAN+ (UPKO)
P.170 Tuaran	N12	Sulaman	11711	113	103.6	Tuaran	Hajiji Mohd. Noor	BN (UMNO)	7774	PN (BERSATU)
P.170 Tuaran	N13	Pantai Dalit	15091	48	314.4	Tuaran	new seat			
P.170 Tuaran	N14	Tamparuli	16597	289	57.4	Tuaran	Jahid Jahim	BN (PBS)	2080	PN+ (PBS)
P.170 Tuaran	N15	Kiulu	10887	676	16.1	Tuaran	Joniston Bangkuai	BN (PBS)	1443	PN+ (PBS)
P.171 Sepanggar	N16	Karambunai	19560	88	222.3	Kota Kinabalu	Azhar Matussin	WARISAN	5366	WARISAN (contested in Darau)
P.171 Sepanggar	N17	Darau	18350	14	1,310.7	Kota Kinabalu	new seat			
P.171 Sepanggar	N18	Inanam	26035	215	121.1	Kota Kinabalu	Kenny Chua Teck Ho	PH (PKR)	7783	PN (STAR) (contesting as independent)
P. 172 Kota Kinabalu	N19	Likas	14939	12	1,244.9	Kota Kinabalu	Tan Lee Fatt	PH (DAP)	7902	WARISAN+ (DAP)
P. 172 Kota Kinabalu	N20	Api-Api	19149	4	4,787.3	Kota Kinabalu	Christina Liew	PH (PKR)	2954	WARISAN+ (PKR)
P. 172 Kota Kinabalu	N21	Luyang	25775	10	2,577.5	Kota Kinabalu	Phoong Jin Zhe	PH (DAP)	12408	WARISAN+ (DAP)
P.173 Putatan	N22	Tanjong Aru	14941	30	498.0	Kota Kinabalu	Junz Wong Hong Jun	WARISAN	4610	WARISAN
P.173 Putatan	N23	Petagas	13763	15	917.5	Penampang (Putatan)	Uda Sulai	WARISAN	208	Uncontested
P.173 Putatan	N24	Tanjung Keramat	14350	13	1,103.8	Penampang (Putatan)	new seat			
P.174 Penampang	N25	Kapayan	30034	19	1,580.7	Penampang & Kota Kinabalu	Jannie Lasimbang	PH (DAP)	13250	WARISAN+ (DAP)
P.174 Penampang	N26	Moyog	19465	473	41.2	Penampang	Jenifer Lasimbang	WARISAN	4442	Uncontested
P.175 Papar	N27	Limbahau	12739	512	24.9	Papar	new seat			
P.175 Papar	N28	Kawang	14932	55	271.5	Papar	Ghulam Haidar Khan Bahadar	BN (UMNO)	2862	PN (BERSATU)
P.175 Papar	N29	Pantai Manis	14322	43	333.1	Papar	Aidi Moktar	WARISAN	2108	Uncontested
P.176 Kimanis	N30	Bongawan	16735	657	25.5	Beaufort & Papar	Daud Yusof	WARISAN	795	WARISAN
P.176 Kimanis	N31	Membakut	13617	292	46.6	Beaufort	Mohd. Arifin Mohd. Arif	BN (UMNO)	2403	PN (BERSATU)
P.177 Beaufort	N32	Klias	16905	423	40.0	Beaufort	Isnin Aliasnih	BN (UMNO)	2336	PN (BERSATU)
P.177 Beaufort	N33	Kuala Penyu	16396	448	36.6	Kuala Penyu	Limus Jury	BN (UPKO)	3545	PN (BERSATU)
P.178 Sipitang	N34	Lumadan	15044	1007	14.9	Beaufort	Matbali Musah	BN (UMNO)	2935	Uncontested
P.178 Sipitang	N35	Sindumin	16762	2708	6.2	Sipitang	Yusof Yakob	WARISAN	760	WARISAN
P.179 Ranau	N36	Kundasang	14986	1836	8.2	Ranau	Joachim Gunsalam	BN (PBS)	255	PN+ (PBS)
P.179 Ranau	N37	Karanaan	13425	185	72.6	Ranau	Masidi Manjun	BN (UMNO)	3782	PN (BERSATU)
P.179 Ranau	N38	Paginatan	15410	1870	8.2	Ranau	Abidin Madingkir	BN (UPKO)	2066	PN (STAR)
P.180 Keningau	N39	Tambunan	16511	1414	11.7	Tambunan	Jeffrey Kitingan	GSB (STAR)	1037	PN (STAR)
P.180 Keningau	N40	Bingkor	17828	397	44.9	Keningau	Robert Tawik @ Nordin	GSB (STAR)	165	PN (STAR)
P.180 Keningau	N41	Liawan	17446	420	41.5	Keningau	Rasinin Kautis	WARISAN	1382	WARISAN
P. 181 Tenom	N42	Melalap	13993	638	21.9	Tenom	Peter Anthony	WARISAN	293	WARISAN
P. 181 Tenom	N43	Kemabong	15086	1819	8.3	Tenom	Jamawi Ja’afar	BN (UMNO)	895	BN (UMNO) (contested in Melalap)
P.182 Pensiangan	N44	Tulid	8910	1250	7.1	Keningau	new seat			
P.182 Pensiangan	N45	Sook	10937	1533	7.1	Keningau	Ellron Alfred Angin	BN (PBRS)	4485	PN (STAR)
P.182 Pensiangan	N46	Nabawan	12475	6114	2.0	Nabawan	Bobbey Ah Fang Suan	BN (UPKO)	2072	Uncontested
P.183 Beluran	N47	Telupid	8952	1407	6.4	Telupid	new seat			
P.183 Beluran	N48	Sugut	7862	2197	3.6	Beluran	James Ratib	BN (UMNO)	1521	BN (UMNO)
P.183 Beluran	N49	Labuk	11712	3844	3.0	Beluran	Abd. Rahman Kongkawang	BN (PBS)	2600	IND
P.184 Libaran	N50	Gum-Gum	12474	777	16.1	Sandakan	Arunarsin Taib	WARISAN	598	WARISAN
P.184 Libaran	N51	Sungai Manila	12761	16	797.6	Sandakan	new seat			
P.184 Libaran	N52	Sungai Sibuga	23308	37	629.9	Sandakan	Musa Aman	BN (UMNO)	2184	Uncontested
P.185 Batu Sapi	N53	Sekong	17054	442	38.6	Sandakan	Arifin Asgali	WARISAN	2035	Uncontested
P.185 Batu Sapi	N54	Karamunting	15896	12	1,324.7	Sandakan	Hiew Vun Zin	WARISAN	3848	WARISAN
P.186 Sandakan	N55	Elopura	25794	19	1,357.6	Sandakan	Chong Ket Kiun	PH (DAP)	6647	WARISAN+ (DAP)
P.186 Sandakan	N56	Tanjong Papat	14287	4	3,571.8	Sandakan	Poon Ming Fung	PH (DAP)	1816	WARISAN+ (DAP)
P.187 Kinabatangan	N57	Kuamut	9854	10954	0.9	Tongod & Kinabatangan	Masiung Banah	BN (UPKO)	4121	IND
P.187 Kinabatangan	N58	Lamag	8159	2142	3.8	Kinabatangan	new seat			
P.187 Kinabatangan	N59	Sukau	10810	4972	2.2	Kinabatangan	Saddi Abdul Rahman	BN (UMNO)	1628	IND
P.188 Lahad Datu	N60	Tungku	13255	3297	4.0	Lahad Datu	Assafal P. Alian	WARISAN	1001	WARISAN
P.188 Lahad Datu	N61	Segama	16575	1144	14.5	Lahad Datu	new seat			
P.188 Lahad Datu	N62	Silam	17395	3049	5.7	Lahad Datu	Dumi Masdal	WARISAN	2932	WARISAN
P.188 Lahad Datu	N63	Kunak	14641	1104	13.3	Kunak	Norazlinah Arif	WARISAN	268	WARISAN
P.189 Semporna	N64	Sulabayan	14012	234	59.9	Semporna	Jaujan Sambakong	WARISAN	4926	WARISAN
P.189 Semporna	N65	Senallang	14336	299	47.9	Semporna	Shafie Apdal	WARISAN	5301	WARISAN
P.189 Semporna	N66	Bugaya	20267	593	34.2	Semporna	Manis Buka Mohd. Darah	WARISAN	7851	WARISAN
P.190 Tawau	N67	Balung	14600	943	15.5	Tawau	Osman Jamal	BN (UMNO)	174	Uncontested
P.190 Tawau	N68	Apas	19378	370	52.4	Tawau	Nizam Abu Bakar Titingan	BN (UMNO)	1787	PN (BERSATU)
P.190 Tawau	N69	Sri Tanjong	26493	19	1,394.4	Tawau	Wong Sze Phin	PH (DAP)	9383	Uncontested
P.191 Kalabakan	N70	Kukusan	12640	8	1,580.0	Tawau	new seat			
P.191 Kalabakan	N71	Tanjong Batu	14875	11	1,352.3	Tawau	Hamisa Samat	BN (UMNO)	1986	Uncontested
P.191 Kalabakan	N72	Merotai	14973	902	16.6	Tawau & Kalabakan	Sarifuddin Hata	WARISAN	2150	WARISAN
P.191 Kalabakan	N73	Sebatik	10131	3630	2.8	Kalabakan	Abd. Muis Picho	BN (UMNO)	193	PN (BERSATU)

== Departing incumbents ==
The following members of the 15th State Legislative Assembly did not participate in this election.

No.	State Constituency	Departing MLA	Party	Date confirmed	First elected	Reason
N03	Pitas	Bolkiah Ismail	IND	12 September 2020	2008	Not seeking re-election
N10	Usukan	Japlin Akim	PN (BERSATU)	10 September 2020	2018	No nomination by the party
N23	Petagas	Uda Sulai	WARISAN	10 September 2020	2018	Not chosen by the party
N26	Moyog	Jennifer Lasimbang	WARISAN	10 September 2020	2018	Not chosen by the party
N29	Pantai Manis	Aidi Moktar	WARISAN	10 September 2020	2018	Not chosen by the party
N34	Lumadan	Matbali Musah	PN (BERSATU)	10 September 2020	2018	No nomination by the party
N46	Nabawan	Bobbey Ah Fang Suan	PN (BERSATU)	10 September 2020	2004	No nomination by the party
N52	Sungai Sibuga	Musa Aman	BN (UMNO)	10 September 2020	1994	No nomination by the party
N53	Sekong	Arifin Asgali	WARISAN	10 September 2020	2018	Not chosen by the party
N67	Balung	Osman Jamal	IND	12 September 2020	2018	Not seeking re-election
N69	Sri Tanjong	Jimmy Wong Sze Phin	PH (DAP)	10 September 2020	2018	Not chosen by the party
N71	Tanjong Batu	Hamisa Samat	IND	12 September 2020	2008	Not seeking re-election

== Opinion polls ==
The following table shows recent opinion polling from last two weeks.

Institute	Date	Warisan Plus (WARISAN)	Gabungan Rakyat Sabah (GRS)	Other
SEEDS Sabah	25 September 2020	40.7%	43.4%	15.9%
Sabah state election, 2018	9 May 2018	45.93%	46.13%	7.94%

== Results ==
Gabungan Rakyat Sabah government (41)					Warisan-led opposition (32)*
17		7	14	3	8	23
Perikatan Nasional		PBS	Barisan Nasional	Other	Pakatan Harapan	WARISAN
11	6	7	14	3	6	23
BERSATU	STAR	PBS	UMNO		DAP	WARISAN
Sabah State Legislative Assembly, 26 September 2020 (73 seats)

=== Summary ===
Party or alliance		Votes	%	Seats	+/–
Gabungan Rakyat Sabah	United Malays National Organisation	122,358	16.73	14	–3
Gabungan Rakyat Sabah	Malaysian United Indigenous Party	86,383	11.81	11	+11
Gabungan Rakyat Sabah	United Sabah Party	49,941	6.83	7	+1
Gabungan Rakyat Sabah	Homeland Solidarity Party	35,586	4.87	6	+4
Gabungan Rakyat Sabah	Parti Bersatu Rakyat Sabah	9,687	1.32	0	–1
Gabungan Rakyat Sabah	Malaysian Chinese Association	8,948	1.22	0	0
Gabungan Rakyat Sabah	Sabah Progressive Party	3,146	0.43	0	0
Gabungan Rakyat Sabah	Total	316,049	43.22	38	+7
Warisan Plus	Sabah Heritage Party	186,749	25.54	23	+2
Warisan Plus	Democratic Action Party	69,477	9.50	6	0
Warisan Plus	People's Justice Party	28,372	3.88	2	0
Warisan Plus	United Progressive Kinabalu Organisation	29,473	4.03	1	–5
Warisan Plus	National Trust Party	3,470	0.47	0	0
Warisan Plus	Total	317,541	43.42	32	+3
Love Sabah Party		29,118	3.98	0	0
Liberal Democratic Party		12,447	1.70	0	0
United Sabah National Organisation (New)		8,815	1.21	0	0
Sabah People's Hope Party		4,415	0.60	0	0
Parti Gagasan Rakyat Sabah		3,747	0.51	0	0
Sabah People's Unity Party		2,160	0.30	0	0
Sabah Native Co-operation Party		604	0.08	0	0
Sabah Nationality Party		24	0.00	0	0
Independents		36,411	4.98	3	+3
Total		731,331	100.00	73	+13
Valid votes		731,331	97.63		
Invalid/blank votes		17,752	2.37		
Total votes		749,083	100.00		
Registered voters/turnout		1,124,598	66.61		
Source: Election Commission of Malaysia

=== Seats that changed allegiance ===
No.	Seat	Previous Party (2018)	Current Party (2020)
N02	(Sabah) Bengkoka	new seat	BN (UMNO)
N03	(Sabah) Pitas	BN (UMNO)	Independent
N05	(Sabah) Matunggong	BN (PBS)	PBS
N06	(Sabah) Bandau	new seat	PN (BERSATU)
N07	(Sabah) Tandek	BN (PBS)	PBS
N08	(Sabah) Pintasan	new seat	PN (BERSATU)
N11	(Sabah) Kadamaian	BN (UPKO)	UPKO
N12	(Sabah) Sulaman	BN (UMNO)	PN (BERSATU)
N13	(Sabah) Pantai Dalit	new seat	BN (UMNO)
N14	(Sabah) Tamparuli	BN (PBS)	PBS
N15	(Sabah) Kiulu	BN (PBS)	PBS
N16	(Sabah) Karambunai	WARISAN	BN (UMNO)
N17	(Sabah) Darau	new seat	WARISAN
N24	(Sabah) Tanjung Keramat	new seat	BN (UMNO)
N27	(Sabah) Limbahau	new seat	WARISAN
N28	(Sabah) Kawang	BN (UMNO)	PN (BERSATU)
N29	(Sabah) Pantai Manis	WARISAN	BN (UMNO)
N31	(Sabah) Membakut	BN (UMNO)	PN (BERSATU)
N32	(Sabah) Klias	BN (UMNO)	PN (BERSATU)
N33	(Sabah) Kuala Penyu	BN (UPKO)	PN (BERSATU)
N34	(Sabah) Lumadan	BN (UMNO)	PBS
N36	(Sabah) Kundasang	BN (PBS)	PBS
N37	(Sabah) Karanaan	BN (UMNO)	PN (BERSATU)
N38	(Sabah) Paginatan	BN (UPKO)	PN (STAR)
N39	(Sabah) Tambunan	STAR	PN (STAR)
N40	(Sabah) Bingkor	STAR	PN (STAR)
N41	(Sabah) Liawan	WARISAN	PN (STAR)
N43	(Sabah) Kemabong	BN (UMNO)	Independent
N44	(Sabah) Tulid	new seat	PN (STAR)
N45	(Sabah) Sook	BN (PBRS)	PN (STAR)
N46	(Sabah) Nabawan	BN (UPKO)	PN (BERSATU)
N47	(Sabah) Telupid	new seat	PBS
N49	(Sabah) Labuk	BN (PBS)	PN (BERSATU)
N51	(Sabah) Sungai Manila	new seat	BN (UMNO)
N57	(Sabah) Kuamut	BN (UPKO)	Independent
N58	(Sabah) Lamag	new seat	BN (UMNO)
N61	(Sabah) Segama	new seat	WARISAN
N68	(Sabah) Apas	BN (UMNO)	PN (BERSATU)
N70	(Sabah) Kukusan	new seat	WARISAN
N73	(Sabah) Sebatik	BN (UMNO)	WARISAN

== Election pendulum ==
The 14th general election witnessed 29 seats from the government side and 31 seats from the non-government side filled the State Legislative Assembly. This count, however, did not include 6 seats from United Progressive Kinabalu Organisation (UPKO) and 4 from United Malays National Organisation (UMNO) that switched allegiance from Musa to Shafie. The government side has 11 safe seats and 4 fairly safe seats, while the non-government side has 2 safe seats and 5 fairly safe seats.

GOVERNMENT SEATS
Marginal
Bengkoka	Harun Durabi	UMNO	31.98
Pintasan	Fairuz Renddan	BERSATU	33.31
Kundasang	Dr. Joachim Gunsalam	PBS	43.35
Tulid	Flovia Ng	STAR	33.45
Lumadan	Ruslan Muharam	PBS	34.55
Paginatan	Abidin Madingkir	STAR	35.65
Tandek	Hendrus Anding	PBS	36.87
Kemabong	Rubin Balang	IND	38.48
Matunggong	Julita Majungki	PBS	39.09
Kuamut	Masiung Banah	IND	39.11
Liawan	Annuar Ayub Aman	STAR	39.12
Pitas	Ruddy Awah	IND	40.14
Telupid	Johnnybone J. Kurum	PBS	42.29
Karambunai	Yakubah Khan	UMNO	42.86
Balung	Hamid Awang	UMNO	44.51
Tempasuk	Mohd. Arsad Bistari	UMNO	45.35
Labuk	Samad Jambri	BERSATU	46.11
Sook	Ellron Alfred Angin	STAR	46.71
Pantai Manis	Tamin @ Mohd. Tamin Zainal	UMNO	49.56
Kuala Penyu	Limus Jury	BERSATU	49.56
Tanjung Keramat	Shahelmey Yahya	UMNO	51.75
Kiulu	Joniston Lumai @ Bangkuai	PBS	51.93
Sungai Sibuga	Mohamad Hamsan Awang Supian	UMNO	52.70
Lamag	Bung Moktar Radin	UMNO	54.06
Sungai Manila	Mokran Ingkat	UMNO	55.61
Sukau	Jafry Ariffin	UMNO	55.67
Nabawan	Abdul Ghani Mohamed Yassin	BERSATU	55.94
Fairly safe
Sugut	James Ratib	UMNO	57.88
Apas	Nizam Abu Bakar Titingan	BERSATU	58.30
Tamparuli	Jahid Jahim	PBS	59.26
Klias	Isnin Aliasnih	BERSATU	59.90
Safe
Bandau	Mohd. Fikri Bahanda	BERSATU	60.41
Membakut	Mohd. Arifin Mohd. Arif	BERSATU	60.70
Tanjung Batu	Andi Muhammad Suryady Bandy	UMNO	62.08
Pantai Dalit	Jasnih Daya	UMNO	62.73
Usukan	Salleh Said Keruak	UMNO	65.28
Sulaman	Hajiji Mohd. Noor	BERSATU	65.83
Bingkor	Robert Tawik @ Nordin	STAR	67.04
Kawang	Ghulamhaidar Khan Bahadar	BERSATU	71.24
Karanaan	Masidi Manjun	BERSATU	73.70
Tambunan	Dr. Jeffrey G. Kitingan	STAR	75.21

NON-GOVERNMENT SEATS
Marginal
Gum-Gum	Arunarsin Taib	WARISAN	39.21
Bongawan	Daud Yusof	WARISAN	42.26
Kukusan	Rina Jainal	WARISAN	42.53
Sebatik	Hassan A. Gani Pg. Amir	WARISAN	44.58
Petagas	Awang Ahmad Sah Awang Sahari	WARISAN	45.49
Banggi	Mohammad Mohamarin	WARISAN	45.89
Merotai	Sarifuddin Hata	WARISAN	47.83
Kunak	Norazlinah Arif	WARISAN	48.65
Darau	Azhar Matussin	WARISAN	48.67
Sindumin	Dr. Yusof Yacob	WARISAN	48.96
Tungku	Assaffal P. Alian	WARISAN	49.15
Tanjong Kapor	Ben Chong Chen Bin	WARISAN	49.84
Melalap	Peter Anthony	WARISAN	50.18
Inanam	Peto Galim	PKR	50.92
Kadamaian	Ewon Benedick	UPKO	51.07
Segama	Mohamaddin Ketapi	WARISAN	52.41
Sekong	Alias Sani	WARISAN	55.07
Silam	Dumi Pg. Masdal	WARISAN	55.40
Fairly safe
Limbahau	Juil Nuatim	WARISAN	57.12
Karamunting	George Hiew Vun Zin	WARISAN	58.76
Safe
Tanjong Aru	Junz Wong Hong Jun	WARISAN	60.34
Moyog	Ignatius Darell Leiking	WARISAN	62.83
Api-Api	Christina Liew Chin Jin	PKR	67.80
Tanjong Papat	Frankie Poon Ming Fung	DAP	68.00
Sulabayan	Jaujan Sambakong	WARISAN	69.04
Elopura	Calvin Chong Ket Kiun	DAP	73.61
Bugaya	Manis Muka Mohd. Darah	WARISAN	74.44
Sri Tanjong	Justin Wong Yung Bin	DAP	76.58
Senallang	Mohd. Shafie Apdal	WARISAN	77.16
Kapayan	Jannie Lasimbang	DAP	77.40
Likas	Tan Lee Fatt	DAP	86.33
Luyang	Phoong Jin Zhe	DAP	90.56

== Aftermath ==
The GRS governing coalition formed in September 2020 after the victory consists of

- United Malays National Organisation (UMNO) (14) :Barisan National Party seat – Won 14 seats
- Malaysian United Indigenous Party (BERSATU) (11), Homeland Solidarity Party (STAR) (6) : Perikatan Nasional – Won 17 seats
- With support from United Sabah Party (PBS) (7).

Warisan saw a gain of 2 more seats from its previous 21 seats in the 2018 election. While its ally PKR and DAP retained their number of seats with 2 and 6 respectively. Warisan also made history by becoming the first and only single party in Sabah to not govern the state despite winning the most seats overall.

On the other side, STAR, led by Jeffrey Kitingan won 6 seats compared to 2 in the previous election, with most of the seats won hailing from the interior of Sabah which is dominated by the Kadazan-Dusun-Murut (KDM) community. UPKO, even though representing the KDM community, managed only 1 seat in this election, a loss from 6 seats in the previous election.

PPBM or Bersatu, despite being a Malay-based party from West Malaysia and contesting in Sabah for the first time, won 11 seats.

The elected assemblywoman for Bugaya, Manis Muka Mohd Darah from WARISAN later died in November 2020, triggering a by-election which was not held until November 2022, concurrently with the 2022 Malaysian general election. A few elected assemblymen also changed parties after the election; see List of seats that changed allegiance in Sabah after state election 2020.

=== COVID-19 pandemic ===
Following the Sabah state government's announcement on 9 August that the state election would be held on 26 September, several members of the public and democracy observers urged local authorities to consider postal voting due to the ongoing pandemic and in order to reduce virus transmissions during the election. On 21 August, the High Court dismissed an appeal by 33 Sabah assemblymen against Governor Juhar Mahiruddin's consent for the dissolution of Sabah's legislative assembly, allowing the state election to go ahead. On 11 September, the Federal Court dismissed Datuk Jahid Noordin Jahim's appeal to stop the election, allowing nominations to proceed the following day.

The return of voters and politicians from Sabah to Peninsular Malaysia has caused a significant influx of COVID-19 cases in Malaysia. Daily reported cases increased to three digit numbers. Several of these ministers and politicians had reportedly not complied with standard procedures around COVID-19. On 14 October, the Federal Government announced the implementation of a Conditional Movement Control Order in Selangor, Putrajaya and Kuala Lumpur due to the rising number of cases.

=== Effects of the 2022 general election ===
Following the results of the Malaysian general election in November 2022, and the formation of government consisting of the alliance between Pakatan Harapan and Barisan Nasional, GRS announced their inclusion into the alliance (despite GRS members Bersatu, SAPP and STAR aligning with Perikatan Nasional at the time), and signed a cooperation agreement with other parties involved on 16 December 2022. On 10 December 2022, MLAs and MPs from Bersatu Sabah announced they will quit the party and become direct member of GRS, in line of the coalition at federal level. On 17 December 2022, GRS officially expelled Bersatu from the coalition. STAR, another member party of both GRS and PN, announced its exit from PN on 5 December 2022. SAPP is the only member party of both GRS and PN as of December 2022, however the party leader Yong Teck Lee announced its exit from PN in December 2024.

Aside from the change above, the status quo is not changed for the government in Sabah. Even though PH and WARISAN is allied with GRS at federal level, they are still opposition to the GRS-led administration at state level.

=== 2023 political crisis ===
The 2023 Sabah political crisis or widely reported on local media as Langkah Kinabalu or the Kinabalu Move, began on 6 January 2023, when the state government of Sabah led by Gabungan Rakyat Sabah (GRS) collapsed when its coalition party Barisan Nasional (BN) withdrew its support. The Leader of UMNO Sabah, a component party of BN, Bung Moktar Radin, Kinabatangan Member of Parliament (MP) and Lamag Assemblyman, cited a lack of confidence in the leadership of Chief Minister of Sabah Hajiji Noor in the withdrawal. UMNO Sabah want to change support from supporting GRS coalition to supporting the WARISAN Plus coalition. On 9 January, both Malaysian leaders, prime minister Anwar Ibrahim and deputy prime minister Ahmad Zahid Hamidi travelled to Kota Kinabalu to meet with Sabah political leaders. This crisis resulted in the approval of the Anti-Switching Parties Law in Sabah (approved in 25 May 2023) and the GRS coalition succeeded in retaining the government.

As of 6 February, there have been no changes in the status quo regarding the government of Sabah, following the decision of 5 UMNO MLAs who publicly supported Hajiji despite Bung's decision, and a reshuffle of the state cabinet on 11 January as a result. As of 25 May 2023, Sabah State Legislative Assembly finally approved the Anti-Switching Parties Law (Anti-frogs habit).

== See also ==
- Politics of Malaysia
- List of political parties in Malaysia
