= Karambunai =

State constituency of Sabah

Karambunai (N16)
Sabah constituency

State constituency
- Legislature: Sabah State Legislative Assembly
MLA
Aliakbar Gulasan
PN
- Constituency created: 2003
- First contested: 2004
- Last contested: 2025

Demographics
- Electors (2025): 39,247

Karambunai is a state constituency in Sabah, Malaysia that has been represented in the Sabah State Legislative Assembly since 2004.

The state constituency was created in the 2003 redistribution and is mandated to return a single member to the Sabah State Legislative Assembly under the first past the post voting system.

== Demographics ==
As of 2020, Karambunai has a population of 164,076 people.

Ethnic breakdown of Karambunai's electorate as of 2025
1. Muslim Bumiputera (71.0%)
2. Non-Muslim Bumiputera (23.0%)
3. Chinese (6.00%)
4. Other ethnicities (0.00%)

== History ==
=== Polling districts ===
According to the gazette issued on 31 October 2022, the Karambunai constituency has a total of 7 polling districts.

State constituency	Polling District	Code	Location
Karambunai (N16)	Karambunai	171/16/01	SK Pengiran Siti Hafsah Karambunai; SK Gentisan
Karambunai (N16)	Gudon	171/16/02	SMK Bandaraya Manggatal Kota Kinabalu
Karambunai (N16)	Taman Indah Permai	171/16/03	Institut Latihan Perindustrian Kota Kinabalu; Institut Penyelidikan dan Kemajuan Pertanian Malaysia (MARDI); SK Unggun Menggatal
Karambunai (N16)	Kebagu	171/16/04	SK Kebagu; Dewan Serbaguna Kompleks Pentadbiran Kerajaan Persekutuan Sabah
Karambunai (N16)	Telipok Laut	171/16/05	SK Malawa
Karambunai (N16)	Telipok Darat	171/16/06	SMK Pekan Telipok
Karambunai (N16)	Pulau Sepanggar	171/16/07	SK Pulau Sepanggar

=== Representation history ===
Members of the Legislative Assembly for Karambunai
Assembly	No	Years	Member	Party
Constituency created from Inanam and Likas
12th	N12	2004–2008	Jainab Ahmad	BN (UMNO)
13th	N12	2008–2013	Jainab Ahmad	BN (UMNO)
14th	N12	2013–2018	Jainab Ahmad	BN (UMNO)
15th	N12	2018–2020	Azhar Matussin	WARISAN
16th	N16	2020–2025	Yakubah Khan	BN (UMNO)
17th	N16	2025–present	Aliakbar Gulasan	PN (PAS)

== Election results ==
Sabah state election, 2025: Karambunai
Party	Candidate	Votes	%	∆%
PN	Aliakbar Gulasan	7,054	27.47	▲27.47
Heritage	Ahmad Jais Otong	6,689	26.05	▼15.38
GRS	Arshad Idris	4,818	18.76	▲18.76
BN	Yakubah Khan	4,475	17.43	▼24.12
Homeland Solidarity Party	Stephen Teo	2,010	7.83	▲7.83
Sabah Dream Party	Adis Jalie	162	0.63	▲0.63
Sabah Peace Party	Hates Abdul	150	0.58	▲0.58
PBK	Mohd Yunus Ibrahim	127	0.49	▲0.49
Pertubuhan Parti Gemilang Anak Sabah	Azman Fathil	73	0.28	▲0.28
Sabah National People's Unity Organisation	Raynold Saikam Salinggou	73	0.28	▲0.28
Sabah Nationality Party	Matkari Kassim	45	0.18	▲0.18
Total valid votes		25,676		
Total rejected ballots		508		
Unreturned ballots		100		
Turnout		26,284	66.97	▲3.24
Registered electors		39,247		
Majority		365	1.42	▲1.30
PN gain from BN		Swing		?
Source(s) "RESULTS OF CONTESTED ELECTION AND STATEMENTS OF THE POLL AFTER THE OFFICIAL ADDITION OF VOTES" (PDF).

Sabah state election, 2020: Karambunai
Party	Candidate	Votes	%	∆%
BN	Yakubah Khan	5,180	41.55	▲8.57
Sabah Heritage Party	Ahmad Jais Otong	5,164	41.43	▼11.67
LDP	Marajoh Unding	1,053	8.45	▲8.45
Love Sabah Party	Dayangku Ayesha Humaira Ak Othman Shah	315	2.53	▲2.53
GAGASAN	Nerudin Ludah	285	2.29	▲2.29
USNO (Baru)	Ibrahim Linggam	90	0.72	▲0.72
Total valid votes		12,087	96.97	
Total rejected ballots		345	2.77	
Unreturned ballots		33	0.26	
Turnout		12,465	63.73	▼13.65
Registered electors		19,560		
Majority		16	0.12	▼20.00
BN gain from Sabah Heritage Party		Swing		?
Source(s) "RESULTS OF CONTESTED ELECTION AND STATEMENTS OF THE POLL AFTER THE OFFICIAL ADDITION OF VOTES".

Sabah state election, 2018: Karambunai
Party	Candidate	Votes	%	∆%
Sabah Heritage Party	Azhar Matussin	14,157	53.10	▲53.10
BN	Jainab Ahmad	8,791	32.98	▼30.36
PAS	Aspar Oyet @ Akbar	1,696	6.36	▲6.36
SAPP	Ahsim Oyok Jamat	1,258	4.72	▼3.73
Total valid votes		25,902	97.16	
Total rejected ballots		613	2.30	
Unreturned ballots		143	0.54	
Turnout		26,658	77.38	▼3.37
Registered electors		34,451		
Majority		5,366	20.12	▼19.53
Sabah Heritage Party gain from BN		Swing		?
Source(s) "RESULTS OF CONTESTED ELECTION AND STATEMENTS OF THE POLL AFTER THE OFFICIAL ADDITION OF VOTES".

Sabah state election, 2013: Karambunai
Party	Candidate	Votes	%	∆%
BN	Jainab Ahmad	14,818	63.34	▲4.35
PKR	Muali Aching	5,542	23.69	▼12.80
SAPP	Aziz Ibrahim	1,977	8.45	▲8.45
Independent	Rano Susulan	172	0.74	▲0.74
Independent	Ag. Maidin Ag. Apong	171	0.73	▲0.73
Total valid votes		22,680	96.95	
Total rejected ballots		661	2.83	
Unreturned ballots		53	0.23	
Turnout		23,394	80.75	▲13.51
Registered electors		28,971		
Majority		9,276	39.65	▲17.15
BN hold		Swing		
Source(s) "Federal Government Gazette – Notice of Contested Election, State Legislative Assembly for the State of Sabah [P.U. (B) 196/2013]" (PDF). Attorney General's Chambers of Malaysia. 26 April 2013. Archived from the original (PDF) on 29 December 2019. "Federal Government Gazette – Results of Contested Election and Statements of the Poll after the Official Addition of Votes, State Constituencies for the State of Sabah [P.U. (B) 237/2013]" (PDF). Attorney General's Chambers of Malaysia. 22 May 2013.

Sabah state election, 2008: Karambunai
Party	Candidate	Votes	%	∆%
BN	Jainab Ahmad	7,914	58.99	▼1.60
PKR	Ag. Maidin Ag. Apong	4,896	36.49	▼0.03
Total valid votes		12,810	95.48	
Total rejected ballots		399	2.97	
Unreturned ballots		207	1.54	
Turnout		13,416	67.24	▲4.60
Registered electors		19,951		
Majority		3,018	22.50	▼1.57
BN hold		Swing		
Source(s) "KEPUTUSAN PILIHAN RAYA UMUM DEWAN UNDANGAN NEGERI SABAH BAGI TAHUN 2008".

Sabah state election, 2004: Karambunai
Party	Candidate	Votes	%
BN	Jainab Ahmad	6,360	60.59
PKR	Saidatul Badru Mohd Said	3,834	36.52
Total valid votes		10,194	97.11
Total rejected ballots		301	2.87
Unreturned ballots		2	0.02
Turnout		10,497	62.64
Registered electors		16,757	
Majority		2,526	24.07
This was a new constituency created.
Source(s) "KEPUTUSAN PILIHAN RAYA UMUM DEWAN UNDANGAN NEGERI SABAH BAGI TAHUN 2004".
