= Pantai Dalit =

Malaysian state constituency

Pantai Dalit (N13)
Sabah constituency

State constituency
- Legislature: Sabah State Legislative Assembly
MLA
Jasnih Daya
GRS
- Constituency created: 2019
- First contested: 2020
- Last contested: 2025

Demographics
- Electors (2025): 26,346

Pantai Dalit is a state constituency in Sabah, Malaysia, that is represented in the Sabah State Legislative Assembly. This is one of the thirteen new state constituencies as result of approval from state legislative and Dewan Rakyat on 17 July 2019 and presenting for the first time for snap election

== Demographics ==
As of 2020, Pantai Dalit has a population of 46,821 people.

Ethnic breakdown of Pantai Dalit's electorate as of 2025
1. Muslim Bumiputera (74.0%)
2. Non-Muslim Bumiputera (18.0%)
3. Chinese (7.00%)
4. Other ethnicities (1.00%)

== History ==
=== Polling districts ===
According to the gazette issued on 31 October 2022, the Pantai Dalit constituency has a total of 7 polling districts.

State constituency	Polling Districts	Code	Location
Pantai Dalit (N13)	Tuaran Bandar	170/13/01	SMK Badin; SM Sains Sabah
Pantai Dalit (N13)	Marabahai	170/13/02	SJK (C) Chen Sin
Pantai Dalit (N13)	Mengkabong	170/13/03	SK Mengkabong
Pantai Dalit (N13)	Berungis	170/13/04	SK Berungis
Pantai Dalit (N13)	Gayang	170/13/05	SK Gayang
Pantai Dalit (N13)	Nongkoulud	170/13/06	SK Nongkolud
Pantai Dalit (N13)	Telipok	170/13/07	SK Pekan Telipok; SK Rugading

=== Representation history ===
Members of the Legislative Assembly for Pantai Dalit
Assembly	No	Years	Member	Party
Constituency created from Kiulu, Tamparuli and Sulaman
16th	N13	2020–2023	Jasnih Daya	BN (UMNO)
16th	N13	2023–2025	Jasnih Daya	GRS (GAGASAN)
17th	N13	2025–present	Jasnih Daya	GRS (GAGASAN)

== Election results ==
Sabah state election, 2025: Pantai Dalit
Party	Candidate	Votes	%	∆%
GRS	Jasnih Daya	8,306	44.62	▲44.62
BN	Alfian Sambas	4,841	26.01	▼34.89
Heritage	Aliasgar Basri	2,878	15.46	▼11.80
Homeland Solidarity Party	Franchis Fahir	1,282	6.89	▲6.89
PN	Mohd Zulkernain Osman	814	4.37	▲4.37
KDM	Jaesman @ Jaess Gipin	387	2.08	▲2.08
Sabah Dream Party	Liam Tawil	106	0.57	▲0.57
Total valid votes		18,614		
Total rejected ballots		266		
Unreturned ballots		26		
Turnout		18,906	71.76	▼2.97
Registered electors		26,436		
Majority		3,465	18.61	▼15.03
GRS gain from BN		Swing		-
Source(s) "RESULTS OF CONTESTED ELECTION AND STATEMENTS OF THE POLL AFTER THE OFFICIAL ADDITION OF VOTES" (PDF).

Sabah state election, 2020: Pantai Dalit
Party	Candidate	Votes	%
BN	Jasnih Daya	6,868	60.90
Sabah Heritage Party	Rakam Sijim	3,074	27.26
Love Sabah Party	Muhamad Amirul Amin	269	2.39
Independent	Johan Jahid	244	2.16
Independent	Petr Pikul	236	2.09
LDP	Rusdi Saelih	138	1.22
USNO (Baru)	Matbee @ Matbeh Ismail	74	0.66
GAGASAN	Awil Kamsari	46	0.41
Total valid votes		10,949	97.08
Total rejected ballots		224	1.99
Unreturned ballots		105	0.93
Turnout		11,278	74.73
Registered electors		15,091	
Majority		3,794	33.64
This was a new constituency created.
