= Parti Gagasan Rakyat Sabah =

Malaysian regional multiracial political party

Sabah People's Ideas Party
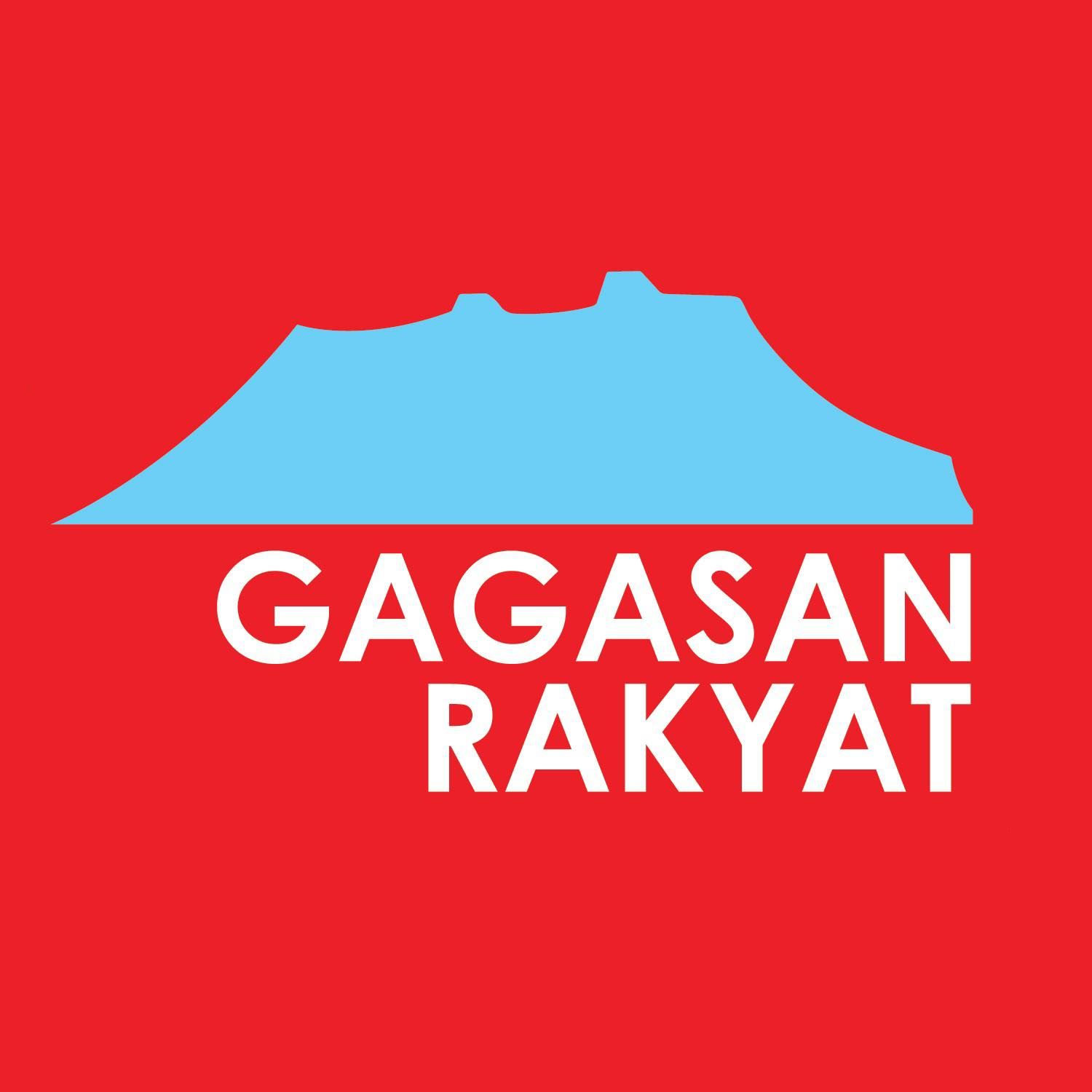
- Malay name: Parti Gagasan Rakyat Sabah
- Abbreviation: GAGASAN / PGRS
- President: Hajiji Noor
- Secretary-General: Razali Razi
- Deputy President: Masidi Manjun
- Vice Presidents: Mohd Arifin Mohd Arif; Rubin Balang; Masiung Banah
- Founder: Ationg Tituh
- Founded: 28 August 2013
- Split from: BERSATU (Hajiji Noor); UMNO (James Ratib); WARISAN (Yusof Yacob)
- Preceded by: AKAR (Ationg Tituh)
- Headquarters: Ibu Pejabat Parti Gagasan Rakyat Sabah, Block G, Lor Plaza Permai 2, Alamesra, 88400 Kota Kinabalu, Sabah
- Student wing: Gagasan Rakyat Student Wing Associate
- Youth wing: Pemuda Gagasan Rakyat Sabah
- Membership (2025): 579,980
- Ideology: Regionalism; Multiracialism; Self-determination; Sabahan nationalism Sabah & Sarawak unity MA63 rights
- Political position: Centre to centre-right
- National affiliation: Gabungan Rakyat Sabah (since 2022); National Unity Government (since 2022)
- Colours: Red & Blue
- Anthem: Gagasan Rakyat Rumah Kita
- Dewan Negara: 2 / 70
- Dewan Rakyat: 0 / 25 (Sabah and Labuan seats)
- Sabah State Legislative Assembly: 26 / 79
- Chief ministers in malaysia: 1 / 13

Election symbol
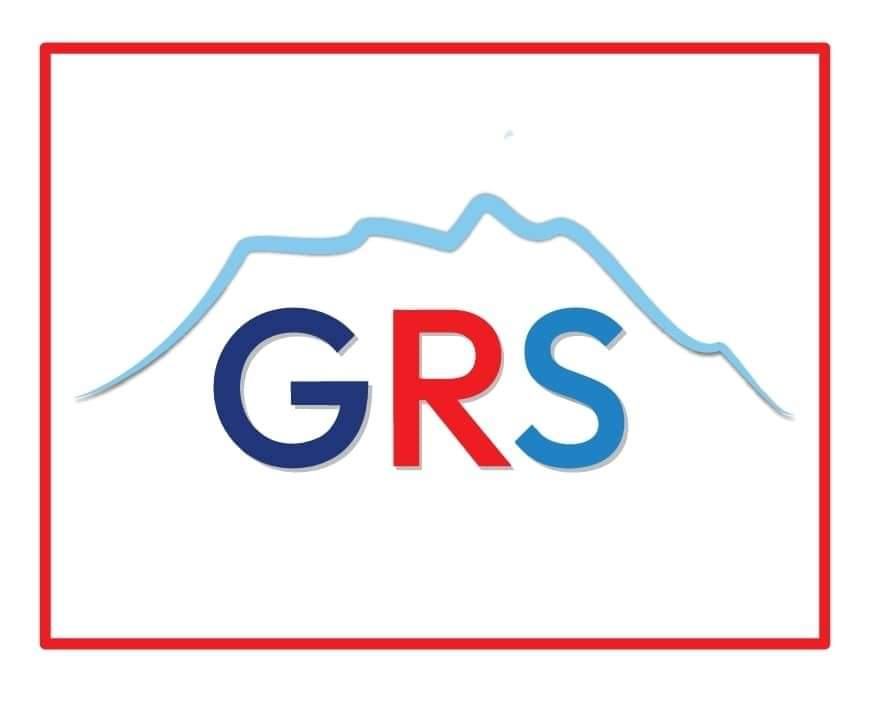

Website
- gagasanrakyat.my

Sabah People's Ideas Party (Malay: Parti Gagasan Rakyat Sabah; abbrev: GAGASAN or PGRS) is a regionalist political party based in Sabah, East Malaysia. Founded in August 2013 by the late Ationg Tituh, continued by Stephen Jacob Jimbangan in 2021, the party was then taken over by Hajiji Noor in 2023 and is currently the largest party in Gabungan Rakyat Sabah (GRS), the ruling coalition in Sabah.

== History ==
The party was founded on 28 August 2013 by the late Ationg Tituh as a successor to the dissolved United People's Justice Front Party (AKAR) but remained dormant until 2016 due to a lack of funds and manpower.

GAGASAN was a member to a failed merger involving Love Sabah Party, Sabah Native Cooperation Party, and a yet-to-be-registered Parti Hak Sabah with Anifah Aman as president. Prior to the party's takeover by Hajiji in 2023, it was dominated by the Kadazan-Dusun-Murut-Rungus (KDMR), an amalgamation of related indigenous ethnic groups.

The party's current leadership under Hajiji Noor was involved in a series of political realignments and party hopping before ending up taking over GAGASAN. Hajiji who once headed UMNO Sabah decided to quit the party in the aftermath of 2018 Malaysian general election. In 2019 the faction became the core of newly-founded expansion of Malaysian United Indigenous Party in Sabah, then component of ruling Pakatan Harapan. The faction supported Muhyiddin's Perikatan Nasional government in 2020, with Hajiji Noor leading then loose Gabungan Rakyat Sabah to win 2020 Sabah state election. Hajiji then led this faction to quit both Perikatan Nasional and BERSATU in 10 December 2022 when Gabungan Rakyat Sabah decided to support Anwar Ibrahim cabinet.

Sabah Chief Minister Hajiji Noor announced his takeover of the party on 29 January 2023, with the party having been accepted into the Gabungan Rakyat Sabah coalition, which Hajiji also led, on 9 December 2022. The four members of parliament who left the Malaysian United Indigenous Party of Sabah in December 2022 were not allowed to join GAGASAN as a result of the federal anti-party hopping law.

The party gained 26 members of the Sabah State Legislative Assembly over the course of the 2023 Sabah political crisis.

== List of leaders ==
President

Order	Name	Term of office		Remarks
1	Dr. Ationg Tituh	28 August 2013	20 May 2021	
2	Stephen Jacob Jimbangan	21 May 2021	29 January 2023	
3	Hajiji Noor	5 February 2023	incumbent	

== Leadership structure ==
=== Central leadership ===
- President:
  - Hajiji Noor
- Deputy President:
  - Masidi Manjun
- Vice Presidents:
  - Mohd Arifin Mohd Arif
  - Rubin Balang
  - Masiung Banah
- Women Chief:
  - Redonah Bahanda
- GAGASAN Youth Chief:
  - Azrul Ibrahim (Acting)
- GAGASAN Women Youth Chief:
  - Emmie M. Idang
- Secretary-General:
  - Razali Razi
- Deputy Secretary-General:
  - Stephen Jacob Jimbangan
- Treasurer-General:
  - Gulamhaidar @ Yusof Khan Bahadar
- Deputy Treasurer-General:
  - Tahir Picho
- Information Chief:
  - Nizam Abu Bakar Titingan
- Supreme Council Members:
  - Japlin Akim
  - Isnin Aliasnih
  - Jaffari Waliam
  - Abdul Ghani Mohamed Yassin
  - Samad Jambri
  - Ruddy Awah
  - Hassan A Gani Pg Amir
  - Limus Jury
  - John Ambrose
  - Bobbey Ah Fang Suan
  - Mohd Basri A Gafar
  - Sotijin Juhui
  - Maksit Saidi
  - Abdul Karim Abdul Wahid
  - Abdul Hakim Gulam Hassan
  - Faisyal Yusof Hamdain Diego
  - Arsit Sedi
  - Awang Kadin Tang

Divisional chairpersons

  - Kudat: Ruddy Awah
  - Kota Marudu: Sarapin Magana
  - Kota Belud: Mohd Arsad Bistari
  - Tuaran: Hajiji Noor
  - Sepanggar: Razali Razli
  - Kota Kinabalu: Raisyal Yusof Hamdain Diego
  - Putatan: Shah Alfie Yahya Ahmad Shah
  - Penampang: Ceasar Mandela Malakun
  - Papar: Gulamhaidar @ Yusof Khan Bahadar
  - Kimanis: Mohd Arifin Mohd Arif
  - Beaufort: Isnin Aliasnih
  - Sipitang: Yusof Yacob
  - Ranau: Masidi Manjun
  - Keningau: Azman Ruslan @ Azaman Hj Ruslan
  - Tenom: Rubin Balang
  - Pensiangan: Abdul Ghani Mohamed Yassin
  - Beluran: James Ratib
  - Libaran: Hazem Mubarak Musa
  - Batu Sapi: George Hiew Vun Zin
  - Sandakan: Awang Kadin Tang
  - Kinabatangan: Masiung Banah
  - Lahad Datu: Rajesh Yusof
  - Semporna: Mohd Hasmin Julpin
  - Tawau: Nizam Abu Bakar Titingan
  - Kalabakan: Andi Rizal
  - Labuan: Rosli Awang Damit

== Party symbols ==
=== Flag and colours ===
GAGASAN's flag consists of a red field defaced with a central light blue simplified silhouette of Mount Kinabalu, above the party name “GAGASAN RAKYAT” in white uppercase, set in two right-aligned lines beneath the silhouette, each line approximately less than a half of the silhouette. The main colors used in the party's logo and flag are red, white and blue.

== Elected representatives ==
=== Dewan Negara (Senate) ===
==== Senators ====
- His Majesty's appointee:
  - Anna Bell @ Suzieana Perian
- Sabah State Legislative Assembly:
  - Bobbey Ah Fang Suan

=== Dewan Undangan Negeri (State Legislative Assembly) ===
Sabah State Legislative Assembly

26 / 79

State	No.	Parliamentary Constituency	No.	State Constituency	Member	Party
Sabah	P167	Kudat	N01	Banggi	Mohammad Mohamarin	GAGASAN
Sabah	P167	Kudat	N03	Pitas	Ruddy Awah	GAGASAN
Sabah	P167	Kudat	N04	Tanjong Kapor	Ben Chong Chen Bin	GAGASAN
Sabah	P169	Kota Belud	N09	Tempasuk	Mohd Arsad Bistari	GAGASAN
Sabah	P170	Tuaran	N12	Sulaman	Hajiji Noor	GAGASAN
Sabah	P170	Tuaran	N13	Pantai Dalit	Jasnih Daya	GAGASAN
Sabah	P173	Putatan	N24	Tanjung Keramat	Shah Alfie Yahya	GAGASAN
Sabah	P175	Papar	N27	Limbahau	Juil Nuatim	GAGASAN
Sabah	P175	Papar	N28	Kawang	Gulamhaidar @ Yusof Khan Bahadar	GAGASAN
Sabah	P175	Papar	N29	Pantai Manis	Pengiran Saifuddin Pengiran Tahir Petra	GAGASAN
Sabah	P176	Kimanis	N31	Membakut	Mohd Arifin Mohd Arif	GAGASAN
Sabah	P177	Beaufort	N32	Klias	Isnin Aliasnih	GAGASAN
Sabah	P177	Beaufort	N33	Kuala Penyu	Limus Jury	GAGASAN
Sabah	P179	Ranau	N37	Karanaan	Masidi Manjun	GAGASAN
Sabah	P181	Tenom	N43	Kemabong	Rubin Balang	GAGASAN
Sabah	P182	Pensiangan	N46	Nabawan	Abdul Ghani Mohamed Yassin	GAGASAN
Sabah	P183	Beluran	N48	Sugut	James Ratib	GAGASAN
Sabah	P183	Beluran	N49	Labuk	Samad Jambri	GAGASAN
Sabah	P184	Libaran	N51	Sungai Manila	Hazem Mubarak Musa	GAGASAN
Sabah	P187	Kinabatangan	N57	Kuamut	Masiung Banah	GAGASAN
Sabah	P190	Tawau	N67	Balung	Syed Ahmad Syed Abas	GAGASAN
Sabah	P190	Tawau	N68	Apas	Nizam Abu Bakar Titingan	GAGASAN
Sabah	P191	Kalabakan	N71	Tanjung Batu	Andi Rizal	GAGASAN
Sabah	-			Nominated Member	Ceasar Mandela Malakun	GAGASAN
Sabah	-			Nominated Member	Razali Razi	GAGASAN
Sabah	-			Nominated Member	Abdul Kassim Razali	GAGASAN
Total	Sabah (26)					

== Government offices ==
=== State governments ===
Since the takeover by ex-BERSATU members, the GAGASAN has led the GRS government in Sabah.

- Sabah (2023–present)

Note: bold as Menteri Besar/Chief Minister, italic as junior partner

State	Leader type	Member	State Constituency
Sabah	Chief Minister	Hajiji Noor	Sulaman

State	Leader type	Member	State Constituency
Sabah	Deputy Chief Minister II	Masidi Manjun	Karanaan

== General election results ==
Election	Total seats won	Seats contested	Total votes	Voting Percentage	Outcome of election	Election leader
2018	0 / 222	7	8,875	1.97%	; independent position	Ationg Tituh

== State election results ==
Sabah State Legislative Assembly
Election	Votes		Seats			Position (Note: As part of electoral coalition.)	Status
Election	Count	%	Result	Won / contested	+/–	Position	Status
2018	Did not contest						No seats
2020	3,747	0.5	0 / 73	0 / 28	Steady	7th	No seats
2020	3,747	0.5	0 / 73	0 / 28	Steady	7th	GRS–PH (2023–2025) (Note: BERSATU, WARISAN and UMNO defectors.)
2025	210,058	18.6	22 / 73	22 / 37	▲22	▲1st (Gabungan Rakyat Sabah)	GRS–PH–BN

== See also ==
- Politics of Malaysia
- List of political parties in Malaysia
