= Second Musa cabinet =

2004 cabinet of Sabah, Malaysia

- 12th Cabinet of Sabah
- 2004–2008
- Date formed: 27 March 2004
- Date dissolved: 15 March 2008

People and organisations
- Head of state: Ahmadshah Abdullah
- Head of government: Musa Aman (UMNO)
- Deputy head of government: Joseph Pairin Kitingan (PBS); Yahyah Hussein (UMNO); Chong Kah Kiat (LDP)
- Total no. of members: 11
- Member parties: Barisan Nasional (BN); United Malays National Organisation (UMNO); United Sabah Party (PBS); Liberal Democratic Party (LDP); United Progressive Kinabalu Organisation (UPKO); Parti Bersatu Rakyat Sabah (PBS); Sabah Progressive Party (SAPP)
- Status in legislature: Coalition government
- Opposition parties: Independent (IND)
- Opposition leader: Johan @ Christopher O T Ghani (IND)

History
- Election: 2004 Sabah state election
- Legislature term: 12th Sabah State Legislative Assembly
- Budget: 2005, 2006, 2007, 2008
- Predecessor: First Musa cabinet
- Successor: Third Musa cabinet

The Second Musa cabinet was formed on 27 March 2004, a few day after Musa Aman was re-appointed as the Chief Minister of Sabah.

== Full members ==
The present Cabinet of Sabah were formed on 27 March 2004 as a result of victory of Barisan Nasional in the 12th state election. 10 members of the State Legislative Assembly have been appointed as ministers on that day.

UMNO (6) PBS (2) SAPP (1) LDP (1) UPKO (1)

Name	Portfolio	Party	Constituency	Took office	Left office and reasons
Musa Aman	Chief Minister	UMNO	Sungai Sibuga	27 March 2004	15 March 2008
Musa Aman	Minister of Finance	UMNO	Sungai Sibuga	27 March 2004	15 March 2008
Joseph Pairin Kitingan MP	Deputy Chief Minister	PBS	Tambunan	27 March 2004	15 March 2008
Joseph Pairin Kitingan MP	Minister of Rural Development	PBS	Tambunan	27 March 2004	15 March 2008
Yahya Hussin	Deputy Chief Minister	UMNO	Petagas	27 March 2004	15 March 2008
Yahya Hussin	Minister of Community Development and Consumer Affairs	UMNO	Petagas	27 March 2004	15 March 2008
Chong Kah Kiat	Deputy Chief Minister	LDP	Tanjong Kapor	27 March 2004	15 March 2008
Chong Kah Kiat	Minister of Tourism, Culture and Environment	LDP	Tanjong Kapor	27 March 2004	15 March 2008
Nasir Sakaran	Minister in Chief Minister's Department	UMNO	Senallang	27 March 2004	15 March 2008
Raymond Tan Shu Kiah	Minister of Infrastructure Development	SAPP	Tanjong Papat	27 March 2004	15 March 2008
Abdul Rahim Ismail	Minister of Agriculture and Food Industries	UMNO	Pantai Manis	27 March 2004	15 March 2008
Hajiji Noor	Minister of Housing and Local Government	UMNO	Sulaman	27 March 2004	15 March 2008
Ewon Ebin	Minister of Industrial Development	UPKO	Paginatan	27 March 2004	15 March 2008
Masidi Manjun	Minister of Youth and Sports	UMNO	Karanaan	27 March 2004	15 March 2008
Yee Moh Chai	Minister of Resources and Information Technology Development	PBS	Api-Api	27 March 2004	15 March 2008

== Assistant ministers ==
Assistant ministers, being a member of the Legislative Assembly but not that of the Cabinet, are deputies to a respective minister and the second-in-command of their respective ministry. 14 members of the 16th State Legislative Assembly have been appointed as assistant ministers on 27 March 2004.

UMNO (7) PBS (4) SAPP (1) MCA (1) UPKO (1)

Name	Portfolio	Party	Constituency	Took office	Left office and reasons
Datu Nasrun Datu Mansur	Assistant Minister to the Chief Minister	UMNO	Lahad Datu	27 March 2004	15 March 2008
Edward Khoo Keok Hai	Assistant Minister to the Chief Minister	MCA	Kapayan	27 March 2004	15 March 2008
Radin Malleh	Assistant Minister to the Chief Minister	PBS	Melalap	27 March 2004	15 March 2008
Sapawi Ahmad	Assistant Minister of Finance	UMNO	Sindumin	27 March 2004	15 March 2008
Tawfiq Abu Bakar Titingan	Assistant Minister of Rural Development	UMNO	Apas	27 March 2004	15 March 2008
Jornah Mozihim	Assistant Minister of Community Development and Consumer Affairs	PBS	Matunggong	27 March 2004	15 March 2008
Karim Bujang	Assistant Minister of Tourism, Culture and Environment	UMNO	Bongawan	27 March 2004	15 March 2008
Aklee Abbas	Assistant Minister of Infrastructure Development	UMNO	Sukau	27 March 2004	15 March 2008
Japlin Akim	Assistant Minister of Agriculture and Food Industries	UMNO	Usukan	27 March 2004	15 March 2008
Bobbey Ah Fang Suan	Assistant Minister of Agriculture and Food Industries	UPKO	Nabawan	27 March 2004	15 March 2008
Jainab Ahmad	Assistant Minister of Industrial Development	UMNO	Karambunai	27 March 2004	15 March 2008
Edward Yong Oui Fah	Assistant Minister of Housing and Local Government	PBS	Tanjong Aru	27 March 2004	15 March 2008
Melanie Chia Chui Ket	Assistant Minister of Resources and Information Technology Development	SAPP	Luyang	27 March 2004	15 March 2008
Jahid Jahim	Assistant Minister of Youth and Sports	PBS	Tamparuli	27 March 2004	15 March 2008

== See also ==
- List of Yang di-Pertua Negeri of Sabah
- Chief Minister of Sabah
- Sabah State Legislative Assembly
- Sabah State Government
