= Aliasgar Basri =

Malaysian politician

Yang Berbahagia Datuk Aliasgar Basri PGDK DSM
- علي أصغر بسري
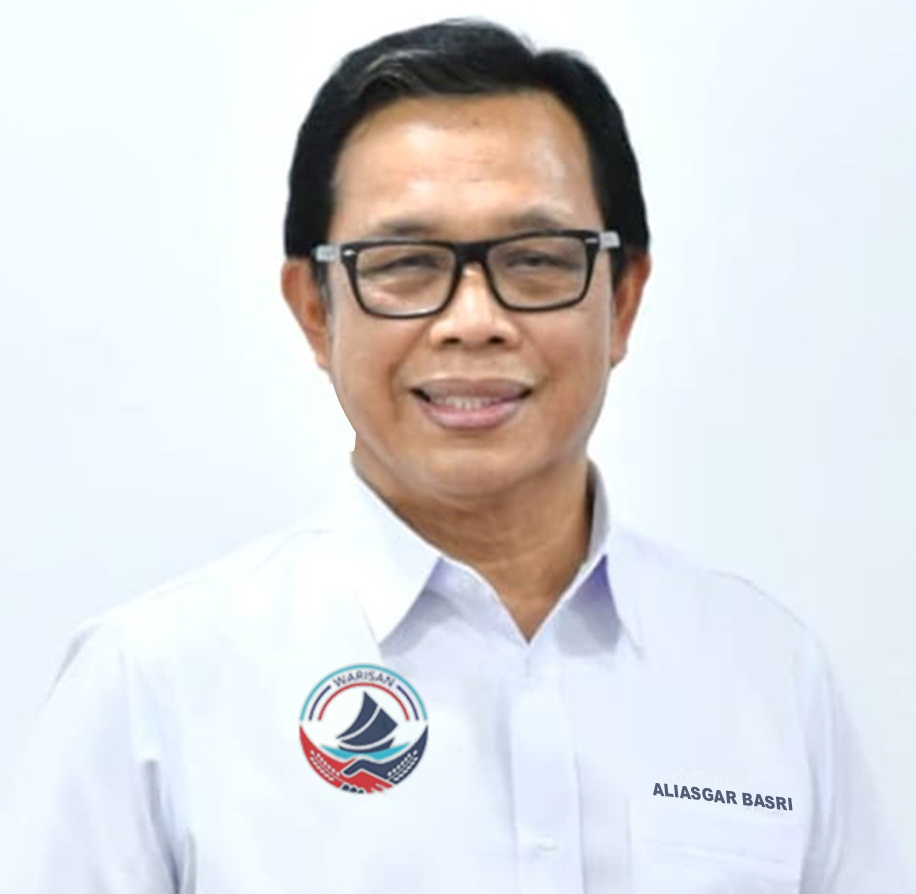
- Datuk Aliasgar Basri in 2022
- Born: Aliasgar @ Ali Ashgar Basri; 25 February 1961 (age 65); Tuaran, Sabah, Malaysia
- Education: Southern Illinois University (1985); University Malaysia Sabah (2004)
- Occupations: Radio presenter, Organising Secretary of Parti Warisan Malaysia, BOD member, University Malaysia Sabah
- Years active: 1979–present
- Height: 173 cm (5 ft 8 in)
- Spouse: Datin Hajjah Jumiah Ele (m. 1979)
- Parents: Haji Basri bin Mohidin; Hajjah Siti Ramlah bt Kawi

Aliasgar Bin Haji Basri (Jawi: علي أصغر بسري; born 25 February 1961) is a Malaysian politician currently living in Tuaran, Sabah, Malaysia. Aliasgar is an alumnus of Southern Illinois University.

== Personal life ==
Aliasgar was born in the town of Tuaran, Sabah. He is married to Datin Hajjah Jumiah bt Ele and the couple is blessed with five children; a son (Zid Aliasgar) and four daughters.

Besides contributing in politics, Aliasgar was also a radio presenter for Radio Televisyen Malaysia (RTM) for the Bajau as well as the Malay language sections via Sabah VFM (the known as Radio Malaysia Sabah multi-languages service) and also Sabah FM (then known as Radio 3 Kota Kinabalu/Radio Malaysia Sabah national language service - Siaran Bahasa Malaysia).

Aliasgar is currently the Organising Secretary of Parti Warisan, Warisan Tuaran P170 divisional liaison chief and member of the Board of Directors of University Malaysia Sabah (UMS).

== Educational background ==
Aliasgar started his primary schooling in Serusup Primary School, Tuaran in 1965 to 1971. He then continued his secondary education at SMK Tuaran (now known as SMK Badin) from 1972 to 1974 and later finished his secondary education in St John's Secondary School, Tuaran from 1974 until 1979.

In 1982, he continued his studies in Bachelor of Science Management at the College of Business and Administration of the Southern Illinois University and obtained his bachelor's degree on 15 May 1985 after 3 years.

In 1999, he furthered his studies at the University Malaysia Sabah and completed his Master of Business Administration course on 12 September 2004. He is among the first batch of 34 graduates to receive Master of Business Administration degrees from University Malaysia Sabah.

== Early politics ==
=== PEMAU ===
Aliasgar has been politically active since his college days, whereby he joined various student affairs organisations notably the North American Student Association or Persatuan Mahasiswa Amerika Utara (PEMAU) which covers both Malaysian students studying in the United States of America and Canada. Aliasgar was the President of PEMAU in 1985.

=== UMNO Club ===
Aliasgar was also among the founders of the first ever UMNO Club of the Malaysian political party UMNO in the USA. He was an exco for the Carbondale UMNO Club in the US from 1983 to 1986, during his studies at Southern Illinois University.

== Sabah, Malaysia 16th State Election 2020, WARISAN ==
In the snap 2020 Sabah state election, at the age of 59 years, Aliasgar Basri was fielded by his party, Sabah Heritage Party or WARISAN to face a 3 cornered fight in the N12 – Sulaman state seat under the P170 Tuaran parliamentary seat, but lost.

Aliasgar fought a three cornered fight between incumbent Assemblyman for Sulaman Hajiji Noor leader of the PN (BERSATU) and later became the Chief Minister and Rekan Hussein from Love Sabah Party (PCS) in the recent state election.

== Malaysia 8th General Election 1990, BERJAYA ==
In the 1990 election, at the young age of 29 years old, Aliasgar was fielded by his party, Sabah People's United Front or BERJAYA to face a 7 cornered fight in the N11 – Sulaman state seat under the P137 Tuaran parliamentary seat, but lost.

== Politic Career, UMNO Politics ==
=== 1991 UMNO Tuaran Division Pro tem Committee member ===
Aliasgar became one of the 20 Pro tem committee members (Malay:AJK Penaja) of the newly formed UMNO Sabah in 1991. He was also the UMNO Tuaran Division committee member (Malay: AJK Bahagian) and appointed as the UMNO Tuaran Division Youth Secretary (Malay:Setiausaha Pemuda Bahagian).

=== 1994 Deputy Director General of UPKR ===
In 1994, Aliasgar was appointed as the Deputy Director General of the People's Development Leaders’ Unit (Malay: Unit Pemimpin Kemajuan Rakyat, UPKR) under the Chief Minister's Department of Sabah.

=== 1996 UPKR's Director General ===
In 1996, Aliasgar was appointed as the Director General of the People's Development Leaders’ Unit (Malay: Unit Pemimpin Kemajuan Rakyat, UPKR) under the Chief Minister's Department of Sabah.

=== 1998 UMNO Tuaran Division Youth Chief ===
In 1998 party elections, Aliasgar contested for the UMNO Tuaran Division Youth Chief post (Malay: Ketua Pemuda Umno Tuaran) and won. He held the post until 2001.

=== 1999 UMNO Sabah State Youth Information Chief ===
Due to a major shuffle in the UMNO Malaysia Youth Movement in 1999, Aliasgar was appointed as the UMNO Sabah State Youth Information Chief (Malay :Ketua Penerangan Pemuda UMNO Sabah).

=== 2000 Malaysia Youth Executive Council ===
In 2000, Aliasgar was appointed as committee member of the Malaysia Youth Executive Council (MBM).

=== 2001 UMNO Tuaran Division Vice Chief ===
In the 2001 party elections, Aliasgar contested for the UMNO Tuaran Division Vice Chief (Malay: Naib Ketua Bahagian Tuaran), but lost.

=== 2004 UMNO Tuaran Division Deputy Chief ===
In the 2004 party elections, Aliasgar contested for the UMNO Tuaran Division Deputy Chief (Malay:Timbalan Ketua Bahagian) and won. He defeated former Divisional UMNO Chief af Tuaran, Datuk Yusof Manan.

=== 2007 UMNO Tuaran Division Deputy Chief ===
In the 2007 party elections, Aliasgar contested for the UMNO Tuaran Division Deputy Chief (Malay:Timbalan Ketua Bahagian) and won. He defeated Dato' Rahman Dahlan for the post.

=== 2007 UMNO Sabah Training Bureau Secretary ===
In 2007, Aliasgar was appointed as the Secretary of Sabah UMNO Training Bureau (Malay: Setiausaha Biro Latihan UMNO Sabah).

=== 2007 UMNO Malaysia Training Bureau committee member ===
In 2007, Aliasgar was appointed as the UMNO Malaysia Training Bureau committee member (Malay: Ahli Jawatankuasa Biro Latihan UMNO Malaysia). During this time, he was involved in conducting more than hundred training courses around Malaysia.

=== 2010 UMNO Tuaran Division Deputy Chief ===
In the 2010 party elections, Aliasgar contested to defend his post the UMNO Tuaran Division Deputy Chief (Malay: Timbalan Ketua Bahagian Tuaran). Aliasgar defeated Dato' Rahman Dahlan for the post.

=== 2013 UMNO Tuaran Division Deputy Chief ===
However, in the 2013 party elections, Aliasgar decided not to defend his post and subsequently 'gave way' to Dato' Rahman Dahlan to win the post unopposed.

== Political career, WARISAN politics ==
=== 2020 WARISAN Sulaman Election Candidate ===
In the 2020 Sabah state election, Aliasgar Basri was fielded by his party, Sabah Heritage Party or WARISAN in the N12 – Sulaman state seat under the P170 Tuaran parliamentary seat.

=== 2022 WARISAN Tuaran Division Chief ===
In the 2022 party elections, Aliasgar contested for the WARISAN Tuaran Division Chief (Malay: Ketua Bahagian) and won. He defeated defending Chief, Rakam Sijim for the post and won with more than half majority.

=== 2023 WARISAN Malaysia Executive Secretary ===
In 2023, Aliasgar was appointed as the Warisan Malaysia Executive Secretary (Malay: Setiausaha Kerja Pusat).

== Acaademia positions ==
=== Member of the Board Of Directors, Universiti Malaysia Sabah (UMS) ===
Aliasgar has been appointed as a member of the University Board Of Directors of Universiti Malaysia Sabah (UMS) on 16 August 2023.

Upon recommendation by the Deputy Minister of Higher Education, Dato' Yusof Apdal, he believes Aliasgar's experience and knowledge will be beneficial to help the Board.

== NGO ==
=== Islamic Leadership Development Program ===
Aliasgar is one of the 13 Fellows from The Philippines, Malaysia and Indonesia of the Islamic Leadership Fellows Program, organised by Asian Institute of Management, Manila (AIM), with the collaboration of British Embassy in the Philippines. He was nominated by his alma mater Universiti Malaysia Sabah to participate in the program.

=== Majlis Belia Malaysia (MBM) ===
Aliasgar is an active member of the Malaysia Youth Council (Majlis Belia Malaysia) in the 1990s during his early days while active in national politics. He is now an alumnus of the Alumni Majlis Belia Malaysia (Sabah) and currently holding the position of Vice President II for his alma mater.

=== United Sabah BUMIS Organization (USBO) ===
Aliasgar is an active member of the United Sabah BUMIS Organization (USBO) an organisation for the Bajau and other indigenous ethnic groups in Sabah. He is currently holding the position of Deputy President II for USBO. TS DSP Pandikar Amin Mulia delivered the letter of appointment to Aliasgar on 20 Apr 2017.

=== Radio Sabah Alumni Association (RASA) ===
Aliasgar is an active member of the Radio Sabah Alumni Association (RASA) the alumnus group for Radio Televisyen Malaysia ex personnels. He is currently holding the position of Vice President for RASA.

=== UMS Alumni Association ===
Aliasgar is an active member of the UMS Alumni Association or Pertubuhan Alumni UMS and was holding the position of Deputy President for his alma mater, University Malaysia Sabah.

== Election results ==
Sabah State Legislative Assembly
Year	Constituency	Candidate	Votes	Pct	Opponent(s)	Votes	Pct	Ballots cast	Majority	Turnout
1990	N11 Sulaman	Aliasgar Basri (BERJAYA)	538	6.61%	Hajiji Noor (USNO)	3,575	43.91%	8,202	281	80.02%
1990	N11 Sulaman	Aliasgar Basri (BERJAYA)	538	6.61%	Jahid Jahim (PBS)	3,294	40.46%	8,202	281	80.02%
1990	N11 Sulaman	Aliasgar Basri (BERJAYA)	538	6.61%	Kalakau Untol (AKAR)	565	6.94%	8,202	281	80.02%
1990	N11 Sulaman	Aliasgar Basri (BERJAYA)	538	6.61%	Shafie Anterak (PRS)	120	1.47%	8,202	281	80.02%
1990	N11 Sulaman	Aliasgar Basri (BERJAYA)	538	6.61%	Yusof Awang Ludin (IND)	38	0.47%	8,202	281	80.02%
1990	N11 Sulaman	Aliasgar Basri (BERJAYA)	538	6.61%	Laugan Tarki Noor (IND)	11	0.14%	8,202	281	80.02%
2020	N12 Sulaman	Aliasgar Basri (WARISAN)	2,820	31.36%	Hajiji Noor (BERSATU)	5,919	65.83%	8,992	3,099	76.78%
2020	N12 Sulaman	Aliasgar Basri (WARISAN)	2,820	31.36%	Rekan Hussien (PCS)	253	2.81%	8,992	3,099	76.78%

== Honours and awards ==
- Sabah
  - Member of the Order of Kinabalu (ADK) (1994)
  - Companion of the Order of Kinabalu (ASDK) (2000)
  - Commander of the Order of Kinabalu (PGDK) – Datuk (2010)
- Malacca
  - Member of the Exalted Order of Malacca (DSM) (2005)
