= Mohd Arifin Mohd Arif =

Malaysian politician (born 1963)

Yang Berhormat Datuk Mohd Arifin Mohd Arif PGDK JP MLA
- محمّد عارفين محمّد عارف

State Minister of Local Government and Housing of Sabah
- Incumbent
- Assumed office 1 December 2025
- Governor: Musa Aman
- Chief Minister: Hajiji Noor
- Assistants: Fairuz Renddan &; Maijol Mahap
- Preceded by: Joachim Gunsalam
- Constituency: Membakut

Minister of Science, Technology and Innovation of Sabah
- In office 11 January 2023 – 30 November 2025
- Governor: Juhar Mahiruddin (2020–2024); Musa Aman (2025)
- Chief Minister: Hajiji Noor
- Assistant: Harun Durabi
- Preceded by: Yakub Khan
- Succeeded by: James Ratib (as Minister of Education, Science, Technology and Innovation)
- Constituency: Membakut

Past Ministerial Roles (Sabah)
- 2013–2018: Assistant Minister to the Chief Minister
- 2020–2022: Minister with Special Tasks
- 2022–2023: Minister of Special Functions and Coordination

Other Positions
- 2021–: Chairman of the Islamic Affairs Coordination Committee
- Advisor on Islamic Affairs to the Chief Minister

Member of the Sabah State Legislative Assembly for Membakut
- Incumbent
- Assumed office 21 March 2004
- Preceded by: Position established
- Majority: 1,743 (2004); 3,499 (2008); 3,510 (2013); 862 (2018); 3,421 (2020); 2,017 (2025)

Vice President of Parti Gagasan Rakyat Sabah
- Incumbent
- Assumed office 5 February 2023 Serving with Rubin Balang & Masiung Banah
- President: Hajiji Noor

Faction represented in the Sabah State Legislative Assembly
- 2004–2018: Barisan Nasional
- 2018–2019: Independent
- 2019–2020: Pakatan Harapan
- 2020–2022: Perikatan Nasional
- Since 2022: Gabungan Rakyat Sabah

Personal details
- Born: Mohd Arifin bin Mohd Arif; 8 May 1963 (age 63) Kimanis, Papar, Crown Colony of North Borneo (now Sabah, Malaysia)
- Party: United Malays National Organisation of Sabah (Sabah UMNO) (until 2018); Malaysian United Indigenous Party of Sabah (BERSATU Sabah) (2019–2022); Parti Gagasan Rakyat Sabah (GAGASAN) (since 2023)
- Other political affiliations: Barisan Nasional (BN) (until 2018); Pakatan Harapan (PH) (2019–2020); Perikatan Nasional (PN) (2020–2022); Gabungan Rakyat Sabah (GRS) (since 2020)
- Spouse: Lenny Natasha Musa
- Relations: Musa Aman (Father-in-law); Anifah Aman (Uncle-in-law); Yamani Hafez Musa (Brother-in-law); Hazem Mubarak Musa (Brother-in-law); Annuar Ayub (Cousin-in-law)
- Education: University of Putra Malaysia (PhD)
- Occupation: Politician

Mohd Arifin bin Mohd Arif (born 8 May 1963) is a Malaysian politician who served as the State Minister of Local Government and Housing of Sabah since December 2025 and State Minister of Science, Technology and Innovation in the Gabungan Rakyat Sabah (GRS) state administration under Chief Minister Hajiji Noor from January 2023 until November 2025, as well as Member of Sabah State Legislative Assembly (MLA) for Membakut since March 2004. Previously, he served as State Minister of Special Functions and Coordination. He is a member and one of the Vice Presidents of the Parti Gagasan Rakyat Sabah (GAGASAN), a component party of the GRS coalition.

On 21 March 2022, he earned his Doctor of Philosophy (PhD) from University of Putra Malaysia.

== Election results ==
Sabah State Legislative Assembly
Year	Constituency	Candidate	Votes	Pct	Opponent(s)	Votes	Pct	Ballots cast	Majority	Turnout
2004	N24 Membakut	Mohd Arifin Mohd Arif (Sabah UMNO)	4,003	63.92%	Awang Tangah Awang Amin (PKR)	2,260	36.08%	6,412	1,743	70.29%
2008	N24 Membakut	Mohd Arifin Mohd Arif (Sabah UMNO)	5,490	73.39%	Awang Tangah Awang Amin (PKR)	1,991	26.61%	7,649	3,499	77.73%
2013	N24 Membakut	Mohd Arifin Mohd Arif (Sabah UMNO)	6,547	65.32%	Narawi Ahmad (PKR)	3,037	30.30%	10,260	3,510	87.30%
2013	N24 Membakut	Mohd Arifin Mohd Arif (Sabah UMNO)	6,547	65.32%	Banjimin Ondoi (SAPP)	300	2.99%	10,260	3,510	87.30%
2013	N24 Membakut	Mohd Arifin Mohd Arif (Sabah UMNO)	6,547	65.32%	Jaapar Ag Gador (STAR)	139	1.39%	10,260	3,510	87.30%
2018	N24 Membakut	Mohd Arifin Mohd Arif (Sabah UMNO)	6,495	57.22%	Abd Sani Marip (WARISAN)	4,092	36.80%	11,565	2,403	86.40%
2018	N24 Membakut	Mohd Arifin Mohd Arif (Sabah UMNO)	6,495	57.22%	Ali Omar Mohd Idris (PHRS)	456	4.02%	11,565	2,403	86.40%
2018	N24 Membakut	Mohd Arifin Mohd Arif (Sabah UMNO)	6,495	57.22%	Rosjelen Salimat (PCS)	223	1.96%	11,565	2,403	86.40%
2018	N24 Membakut	Mohd Arifin Mohd Arif (Sabah UMNO)	6,495	57.22%	Yahya Ahmad (IND)	85	1.06%	11,565	2,403	86.40%
2020	N31 Membakut	Mohd Arifin Mohd Arif (Sabah BERSATU)	6,363	60.70%	Mohd Kamaruddin Abd Hamid (WARISAN)	2,942	28.07%	10,482	3,421	76.98%
2020	N31 Membakut	Mohd Arifin Mohd Arif (Sabah BERSATU)	6,363	60.70%	Ag Duramin Tafa (IND)	588	5.61%	10,482	3,421	76.98%
2020	N31 Membakut	Mohd Arifin Mohd Arif (Sabah BERSATU)	6,363	60.70%	Saat Ag. Damit (PCS)	526	5.02%	10,482	3,421	76.98%
2020	N31 Membakut	Mohd Arifin Mohd Arif (Sabah BERSATU)	6,363	60.70%	Seniati Abd Ghani (USNO Baru)	63	0.60%	10,482	3,421	76.98%
2025	N31 Membakut	Mohd Arifin Mohd Arif (GAGASAN)	5,668	39.95%	Rusman Dulamit (Sabah UMNO)	3,651	25.73%	14,311	2,017	77.20%
2025	N31 Membakut	Mohd Arifin Mohd Arif (GAGASAN)	5,668	39.95%	Mohamad Said @ Ismail Sait (WARISAN)	2,199	15.50%	14,311	2,017	77.20%
2025	N31 Membakut	Mohd Arifin Mohd Arif (GAGASAN)	5,668	39.95%	Rowindy Lawrence Odong (UPKO)	1,788	12.60%	14,311	2,017	77.20%
2025	N31 Membakut	Mohd Arifin Mohd Arif (GAGASAN)	5,668	39.95%	Adrian Lajim (STAR)	324	2.28%	14,311	2,017	77.20%
2025	N31 Membakut	Mohd Arifin Mohd Arif (GAGASAN)	5,668	39.95%	Yahya Ahmad (ANAK NEGERI)	278	1.96%	14,311	2,017	77.20%
2025	N31 Membakut	Mohd Arifin Mohd Arif (GAGASAN)	5,668	39.95%	Haslan Wasli (IND)	152	1.07%	14,311	2,017	77.20%
2025	N31 Membakut	Mohd Arifin Mohd Arif (GAGASAN)	5,668	39.95%	Kamal Idris (IMPIAN)	67	0.47%	14,311	2,017	77.20%
2025	N31 Membakut	Mohd Arifin Mohd Arif (GAGASAN)	5,668	39.95%	Aziz Angkiu @ Jaafar (PPRS)	38	0.27%	14,311	2,017	77.20%
2025	N31 Membakut	Mohd Arifin Mohd Arif (GAGASAN)	5,668	39.95%	Suliaman Alladad (PKS)	23	0.16%	14,311	2,017	77.20%

== Honours ==
- Sabah
  - Commander of the Order of Kinabalu (PGDK) – Datuk (2008)
  - Justice of the Peace of Sabah (JP) (2006)
