= Nizam Abu Bakar Titingan =

Malaysian politician (born 1966)

Yang Berhormat Datuk Haji Nizam Abu Bakar Titingan PGDK KMN MLA
- نظام أبو بكر تيتيڠن

State Minister of Youth Development, Sports Advancement and Creative Industries of Sabah
- Incumbent
- Assumed office 1 December 2025
- Governor: Musa Aman
- Chief Minister: Hajiji Noor
- Assistant: Anil Sandhu
- Preceded by: Ellron Alfred Angin (as Minister of Youth and Sports)
- Constituency: Apas

State Assistant Minister to the Chief Minister of Sabah
- In office 24 October 2022 – 30 November 2025 Serving with Abidin Madingkir & Ruslan Muharam
- Governor: Juhar Mahiruddin (2022–2024); Musa Aman (2025)
- Chief Minister: Hajiji Noor
- Preceded by: Wetrom Bahanda
- Succeeded by: Isnin Aliasnih
- Constituency: Apas

State Assistant Minister of Finance of Sabah
- In office 7 October 2020 – 24 October 2022 Serving with Jasnih Daya
- Governor: Juhar Mahiruddin
- Chief Minister: Hajiji Noor
- Minister: Hajiji Noor; Masidi Manjun (Second Minister)
- Preceded by: Kenny Chua Teck Ho
- Succeeded by: Julita Mojungki
- Constituency: Apas

Member of the Sabah State Legislative Assembly for Apas
- Incumbent
- Assumed office 9 May 2018
- Preceded by: Tawfiq Titingan (BN–UMNO)
- Majority: 1,787 (2018); 2,049 (2020); 4,248 (2025)

Information Chief of Parti Gagasan Rakyat Sabah
- Incumbent
- Assumed office 5 February 2023
- President: Hajiji Noor

Division Chairman of N63 Apas Branch of Parti Gagasan Rakyat Sabah
- Incumbent
- Assumed office 5 February 2023
- President: Hajiji Noor

Faction represented in the Sabah State Legislative Assembly
- 2018: Barisan Nasional
- 2018–2019: Independent
- 2019–2020: Pakatan Harapan
- 2020–2022: Perikatan Nasional
- starting 2020: Gabungan Rakyat Sabah

Personal details
- Born: Nizam bin Abu Bakar Titingan; 7 November 1966 (age 60) Tawau, Sabah, Malaysia
- Party: United Malays National Organisation of Sabah (Sabah UMNO) (until 2018); Malaysian United Indigenous Party of Sabah (Sabah BERSATU) (2019–2022); Parti Gagasan Rakyat Sabah (GAGASAN) (since 2023)
- Other political affiliations: Barisan Nasional (BN) (until 2018); Pakatan Harapan (PH) (2019–2020); Perikatan Nasional (PN) (2020–2022); Gabungan Rakyat Sabah (GRS) (since 2020)
- Spouse: Wahida Mardiana Norsalim
- Relations: Ahmad Bahrom (elder brother); Tawfiq Titingan (elder brother; died 2018); Kee Kim Swee (matrilineal great-grandfather; deceased)
- Parent(s): Abu Bakar Titingan Damsani; Kee Hafsah Kee Sulaiman
- Occupation: Politician

Nizam Abu Bakar Titingan (born 7 November 1966) is a Malaysian politician who became the State Minister of Youth, Sports Development and Creative Economy of Sabah in the Gabungan Rakyat Sabah (GRS) state administration under Chief Minister Hajiji Noor in December 2025, as well as Member of the Sabah State Legislative Assembly (MLA) for Apas since May 2018. He formerly was State Assistant Minister to the Chief Minister of Sabah from October 2022 to November 2025 and State Assistant Minister of Finance of Sabah from October 2020 to October 2022 in the GRS state administration under Chief Minister and Minister Hajiji Noor. He is a member of the Parti Gagasan Rakyat Sabah (GAGASAN), a component party of the GRS coalition. He was also the Information Chief and Division Chairman of Apas of GAGASAN since February 2023.

== Personal life ==
Nizam was born to Sabah politician Abu Bakar Titingan Damsani (1920–1980), an ethnic Suluk and Kee Hafsah Kee Sulaiman (1926–2012), a Sino-Native of mixed Tidong, Suluk and Hainanese Chinese descent who is also a granddaughter of Tawau pioneer, Kee Kim Swee; he has 12 siblings, including politician Tawfiq (1963–2018).

== Election results ==
Sabah State Legislative Assembly
Year	Constituency	Candidate	Votes	Pct	Opponent(s)	Votes	Pct	Ballots cast	Majority	Turnout
2018	N56 Apas	Nizam Abu Bakar Titingan (Sabah UMNO)	7,243	53.58%	Abdul Salip Ejal (WARISAN)	5,456	40.36%	13,841	1,787	72.90%
2018	N56 Apas	Nizam Abu Bakar Titingan (Sabah UMNO)	7,243	53.58%	Daud Jalaluddin (PAS)	487	3.60%	13,841	1,787	72.90%
2018	N56 Apas	Nizam Abu Bakar Titingan (Sabah UMNO)	7,243	53.58%	Alizaman Jijurahman (PHRS)	333	2.46%	13,841	1,787	72.90%
2020	N68 Apas	Nizam Abu Bakar Titingan (Sabah BERSATU)	6,252	58.30%	Amrullah @ Ambrullah Kamal (WARISAN)	4,203	39.20%	10,724	2,049	55.34%
2020	N68 Apas	Nizam Abu Bakar Titingan (Sabah BERSATU)	6,252	58.30%	Datu Indal Datu Ismail (PCS)	186	1.73%	10,724	2,049	55.34%
2020	N68 Apas	Nizam Abu Bakar Titingan (Sabah BERSATU)	6,252	58.30%	Mohd Sayadi Bakal (USNO Baru)	83	0.77%	10,724	2,049	55.34%
2025	N68 Apas	Nizam Abu Bakar Titingan (GAGASAN)	9,239	49.66%	Sarman Amat Simito (WARISAN)	4,991	26.83%	18,954	4,248	58.84%
2025	N68 Apas	Nizam Abu Bakar Titingan (GAGASAN)	9,239	49.66%	Elmiariezan Ardan (Sabah UMNO)	2,151	11.56%	18,954	4,248	58.84%
2025	N68 Apas	Nizam Abu Bakar Titingan (GAGASAN)	9,239	49.66%	Lim Ting Khai (Sabah BERSATU)	1,949	10.43%	18,954	4,248	58.84%
2025	N68 Apas	Nizam Abu Bakar Titingan (GAGASAN)	9,239	49.66%	Herman Amdas (IMPIAN)	177	0.95%	18,954	4,248	58.84%
2025	N68 Apas	Nizam Abu Bakar Titingan (GAGASAN)	9,239	49.66%	Marsiah Omat (PPRS)	105	0.56%	18,954	4,248	58.84%

== Honours ==
- Malaysia
  - Officer of the Order of the Defender of the Realm (KMN) (2009)
- Sabah
  - Commander of the Order of Kinabalu (PGDK) – Datuk (2014)
  - Companion of the Order of Kinabalu (ASDK) (2003)
  - Member of the Order of Kinabalu (ADK) (2001)
  - Grand Star of the Order of Kinabalu (BSK) (1999)
