= Kee Kim Swee =

Malaysian customs examiner (1863–1936)

Kapitan China Kee Kim Swee (or Kee Kim Sui, also known as Kee Abdullah after he converted to Islam) was one of the prominent and important Chinese (Hainanese) pioneer who settled in Tawau, Sabah. He was appointed as the first customs examiner and revenue collector by the British North Borneo (Chartered) Company in Tawau, 1894. A year later, Tawau's development was entrusted to his hands by the British administration. He became the first Pengulu or Orang Kaya (OKK) in Tawau, Sabah. Tawau (then known as Tanjong) became a modern town under Kee Kim Swee's lead, as he engineered Tawau into a business and commercial area in the early 1900s.

After he died, his son OKK Kee Abu Bakar (died 1953) became his successor as the Penghulu, among his descendants today are his great-grandsons, Sabah politicians Datuk Bahrom (born 1946), Datuk Tawfiq (1963–2018) and Datuk Nizam (born 1966), the sons of Datin Kee Hafsah (his granddaughter through his eldest born child cum son, Kee Sulaiman) as well as former Sabah state secretary from 2000 to 2008, Datuk K.Y. Mustafa (born 1948), the son of Kee Yusof (his grandson through his son, Kee Abu Bakar).

== Early life and career ==
Kee Abdullah (Kee Kim Swee) was born in 1863 in the Crown Colony of Labuan. Little is known about his biological mother in which he had a step-parent known by the name of Kipas.

In 1883, at the age of 20 years, as the courteous and respected Agent of the Company in Brunei, Kapitan Kee Kim Swee was appointed as Datuk Temenggung over the Chinese community by Sultan Abdul Momin.

In 1885, while on a trading journey with his father to Sandakan, their Tongkang boat encountered a mishap and capsized at Marudu Bay. His father of Hainanese origin died in the incident and was buried in a Chinese cemetery in the district of Kudat, Sabah. He survived the accident and was rescued by villagers, of which then he dwelled at a house belonging to a native local Suluk man named Datu Husin until his recovery.

In 1894, Kee Kim Swee was recruited by the British North Borneo Chartered Company as a customs examiner and revenue collector in Tawau. One of his many tasks was to collect a one-dollar poll tax from the residents. His unique ability to converse in Arabic as well as romanised Malay along with a few several Sabahan native languages and also Jawi literate, served as a link between the native and Chinese groups with the government. Thus, he was often called upon for his view and to provide representation. He died in 1936 aged 73.

== Family ==
He converted to Islam when he married a Tawau local mixed race Suluk-Tidong woman named Jumaatiah Ame Maidin and later changed his name into Kee Abdullah. His marriage with Jumaatiah gave him 18 children, 13 boys and 5 girls.

His children with Jumaatiah Ame Maidin, were, in order of birth:

- Kee Sulaiman (1897–1979)
- Kee Othman (1899–1971)
- OKK Kee Abu Bakar (1901–1953)
- Kee Abdul Aziz (1903–unknown)
- Child name not recorded (January 1905–unknown)
- Kee Aishah (December 1905–1985)
- Kee Muhammad Sidek (1907–1947)
- Kee Hatifah (1909–1969)
- Kee Muhammad Ali (1911–1977)
- Kee Ahmad Kamaruddin (1913–unknown)
- Kee Ahmad Omar (1915–1931)
- Child name not recorded (1917–unknown)
- Kee Abdul Jalil (1919–1987)
- Kee Dzawiyah (stillborn, 1921)

Several of his children's names were not recorded.

His early prior marriage with a Hakka Chinese woman from Kudat gave them 3 children, 2 boys and 1 girl. Both of his sons went back to China, whilst the daughter changed her surname into "Chin" by marriage.
