= Masiung Banah =

Malaysian politician

Yang Berhormat Datuk Masiung Banah PGDK ASDK BSK MLA

Ministerial Roles (Sabah)
- 2013–2018: Assistant Minister of Youth and Sports
- 2018: Minister of Youth and Sports

Vice President of the Parti Gagasan Rakyat Sabah
- Incumbent
- Assumed office 5 February 2023 Serving with Mohd Arifin Mohd Arif & Rubin Balang
- President: Hajiji Noor

Division Chairman of N57 Kuamut Branch of Parti Gagasan Rakyat Sabah
- Incumbent
- Assumed office 2023
- President: Hajiji Noor

Faction represented in the Sabah State Legislative Assembly
- 2008–2018: Barisan Nasional
- 2018: United Pasokmomogun Kadazandusun Murut Organisation
- 2018: United Progressive Kinabalu Organisation
- 2018–2020: Heritage Party
- 2020–2023: Independent
- Since 2023: Gabungan Rakyat Sabah

Personal details
- Born: Masiung Banah; 19 May 1972 (age 54) Kinabatangan, Sandakan Division, Sabah, Malaysia
- Citizenship: Malaysian
- Party: United Progressive Kinabalu Organisation (UPKO) (until 2018); WARISAN (2018−2020); Independent (2020−2023); Parti Gagasan Rakyat Sabah (since 2023)
- Other political affiliations: Barisan Nasional (BN) (until 2018); Gabungan Rakyat Sabah (GRS) (since 2023)
- Spouse: Grace Elvira Ewon Ebin
- Relations: Ewon Ebin (Father-in-law)
- Occupation: Politician

Masiung Banah (born 19 May 1972) is a Malaysian politician who has served as Member of the Sabah State Legislative Assembly (MLA) for Kuamut since March 2008. He is a member and one of the Vice Presidents of the Parti Gagasan Rakyat Sabah (GAGASAN), a component party of the Gabungan Rakyat Sabah (GRS) coalition.

== Election results ==
Sabah State Legislative Assembly
Year	Constituency	Candidate	Votes	Pct	Opponent(s)	Votes	Pct	Ballots cast	Majority	Turnout
2008	N47 Kuamut	Masiung Banah (UPKO)	3,784	51.48%	Mustapa Datu Tambuyong (IND)	2,112	28.74%	7,650	1,672	67.33%
2008	N47 Kuamut	Masiung Banah (UPKO)	3,784	51.48%	Abdul Razak Jamil (PKR)	1,143	15.55%	7,650	1,672	67.33%
2008	N47 Kuamut	Masiung Banah (UPKO)	3,784	51.48%	Duin Bintarang (IND)	206	2.80%	7,650	1,672	67.33%
2008	N47 Kuamut	Masiung Banah (UPKO)	3,784	51.48%	Jusing Sabran (DAP)	105	1.43%	7,650	1,672	67.33%
2013	N47 Kuamut	Masiung Banah (UPKO)	7,607	64.51%	Mustapa Datu Tambuyong (PKR)	2,989	25.35%	12,142	4,618	81.60%
2013	N47 Kuamut	Masiung Banah (UPKO)	7,607	64.51%	Edward Podok (STAR)	1,196	10.14%	12,142	4,618	81.60%
2018	N47 Kuamut	Masiung Banah (UPKO)	8,042	59.00%	Norfaizah Chua (WARISAN)	3,921	29.07%	14,093	4,121	78.80%
2018	N47 Kuamut	Masiung Banah (UPKO)	8,042	59.00%	James Ait (STAR)	1,132	8.31%	14,093	4,121	78.80%
2018	N47 Kuamut	Masiung Banah (UPKO)	8,042	59.00%	Jumaidin Lakalla (PAS)	330	2.12%	14,093	4,121	78.80%
2018	N47 Kuamut	Masiung Banah (UPKO)	8,042	59.00%	Edward Podok (PCS)	205	1.50%	14,093	4,121	78.80%
2020	N57 Kuamut	Masiung Banah (IND)	2,802	39.11%	Bensom Inggam (UPKO)	1,824	25.47%	7,164	978	72.70%
2020	N57 Kuamut	Masiung Banah (IND)	2,802	39.11%	Juhari Janan (UMNO)	1,547	21.59%	7,164	978	72.70%
2020	N57 Kuamut	Masiung Banah (IND)	2,802	39.11%	Mohd Meszi Ng Abdullah (PCS)	721	10.06%	7,164	978	72.70%
2020	N57 Kuamut	Masiung Banah (IND)	2,802	39.11%	Ationg Tituh (GAGASAN)	270	3.77%	7,164	978	72.70%
2025	N57 Kuamut	Masiung Banah (GAGASAN)	4,980	40.06%	Norfaizah Chua (WARISAN)	1,694	13.63%	12,721	457	69.79%
2025	N57 Kuamut	Masiung Banah (GAGASAN)	4,980	40.06%	Abu Bakar Ellah (KDM)	224	1.80%	12,721	457	69.79%
2025	N57 Kuamut	Masiung Banah (GAGASAN)	4,980	40.06%	Jevronnie Mandek (STAR)	648	5.21%	12,721	457	69.79%
2025	N57 Kuamut	Masiung Banah (GAGASAN)	4,980	40.06%	Mohina Sidom (UPKO)	4,523	36.38%	12,721	457	69.79%
2025	N57 Kuamut	Masiung Banah (GAGASAN)	4,980	40.06%	Ted Kelvin Sudin (IMPIAN)	224	1.80%	12,721	457	69.79%
2025	N57 Kuamut	Masiung Banah (GAGASAN)	4,980	40.06%	John Sungkiang (PPRS)	107	0.86%	12,721	457	69.79%
2025	N57 Kuamut	Masiung Banah (GAGASAN)	4,980	40.06%	Duin Daud Tarang (IND)	32	0.26%	12,721	457	69.79%

== Honours ==
- Sabah :
  - Commander of the Order of Kinabalu (PGDK) – Datuk (2014)
  - Companion of the Order of Kinabalu (ASDK) (2009)
  - Grand Star of the Order of Kinabalu (BSK) (2000)
