= Bobbey Ah Fang Suan =

Malaysian politician

Yang Berhormat Senator Datuk Bobbey Ah Fang Suan PGDK

Senator Elected by the Sabah State Legislative Assembly
- Incumbent
- Assumed office 5 January 2021 Serving with Donald Peter Mojuntin (until December 2021); Noraini Idris (2021–2024); Edward Linggu (since 2024)
- Monarchs: Abdullah (2021–2024); Ibrahim (since 2024)
- Prime Minister: Muhyiddin Yassin (2021); Ismail Sabri Yaakob (2021–2022); Anwar Ibrahim (since 2022)
- Preceded by: Abdul Ghani Mohamed Yassin

Ministerial roles (Sabah)
- 2004–2013: Assistant Minister of Agriculture and Food Industries
- 2013–2018: Assistant Minister of Infrastructure Development
- 2018: Minister with Special Duties

Faction represented in Dewan Negara
- 2021–2022: Perikatan Nasional
- Since 2021: Gabungan Rakyat Sabah

Faction represented in the Sabah State Legislative Assembly
- 2004–2018: Barisan Nasional
- 2018–2019: United Pasokmomogun Kadazandusun Murut Organisation
- 2019: Independent
- 2019–2020: Pakatan Harapan
- 2020: Malaysian United Indigenous Party
- 2020: Perikatan Nasional

Personal details
- Born: Bobbey Ah Fang bin Suan Pensiangan, Sabah, Malaysia
- Citizenship: Malaysia
- Party: UPKO (until 2018); Malaysian United Indigenous Party of Sabah (Sabah BERSATU) (2019–2022); Parti Gagasan Rakyat Sabah (GAGASAN) (2023-present)
- Other political affiliations: Barisan Nasional (BN) (1994–2018); Perikatan Nasional (PN) (2020–2022); Gabungan Rakyat Sabah (GRS) (2022-present)
- Spouse: Barbara Edward Marius
- Occupation: Politician

Bobbey Ah Fang Suan is a Malaysian politician currently serving in his second term as a Senator. He had served as the Member of Sabah State Legislative Assembly (MLA) for Nabawan from March 2004 until September 2020. He has also served as the State Minister of Special Duties in May 2018. He is a member of the Parti Gagasan Rakyat Sabah (GAGASAN), which is a major component of the ruling Gabungan Rakyat Sabah (GRS) coalition both in federal and state levels.

== Election results ==
Sabah State Legislative Assembly
Year	Constituency	Candidate	Votes	Pct	Opponent(s)	Votes	Pct	Ballots cast	Majority	Turnout
1994	N40 Kemabong	Bobbey Ah Fang Suan (PDS)	2,371	39.87%	Rubin Balang (PBS)	3,521	59.22%	6,018	1,150	81.70%
1994	N40 Kemabong	Bobbey Ah Fang Suan (PDS)	2,371	39.87%	Lim Antuka (BERSEKUTU)	54	0.91%	6,018	1,150	81.70%
2004	N38 Nabawan	Bobbey Ah Fang Suan (UPKO)	3,478	80.23%	Gabriel Uwing Agunsung (IND)	857	19.77%	4,479	2,621	66.42%
2008	N38 Nabawan	Bobbey Ah Fang Suan (UPKO)	3,414	70.58%	Gabriel Uwing Agunsung (PKR)	1,327	27.44%	4,891	2,087	68.42%
2008	N38 Nabawan	Bobbey Ah Fang Suan (UPKO)	3,414	70.58%	Alexsius Mangka (BERSEKUTU)	96	1.98%	4,891	2,087	68.42%
2013	N38 Nabawan	Bobbey Ah Fang Suan (UPKO)	3,816	49.82%	Raymond Ahuar (PKR)	3,474	45.35%	7,844	342	79.70%
2013	N38 Nabawan	Bobbey Ah Fang Suan (UPKO)	3,816	49.82%	George Eram (STAR)	310	4,05%	7,844	342	79.70%
2013	N38 Nabawan	Bobbey Ah Fang Suan (UPKO)	3,816	49.82%	Sidum Manjin (BERSAMA)	41	0.54%	7,844	342	79.70%
2013	N38 Nabawan	Bobbey Ah Fang Suan (UPKO)	3,816	49.82%	Fatimah Agitor (IND)	18	0.24%	7,844	342	79.70%
2018	N38 Nabawan	Bobbey Ah Fang Suan (UPKO)	5,474	59.52%	Ahuar Rasam (WARISAN)	3,402	36.99%	9,443	2,072	77.00%
2018	N38 Nabawan	Bobbey Ah Fang Suan (UPKO)	5,474	59.52%	Apandy Angindi (PHRS)	165	1.79%	9,443	2,072	77.00%
2018	N38 Nabawan	Bobbey Ah Fang Suan (UPKO)	5,474	59.52%	Angin Lambahan (PCS)	156	1.70%	9,443	2,072	77.00%

== Honours ==
- Malaysia
  - Recipient of the 17th Yang di-Pertuan Agong Installation Medal
- Sabah
  - Commander of the Order of Kinabalu (PGDK) – Datuk (2006)
