= Ationg Tituh =

Malaysian politician (1959–2025)

Dr. Ationg Tituh AMN

Founder & 1st President of Parti Gagasan Rakyat Sabah
- In office 2013–2021
- Deputy: Hiew King Cheu
- Preceded by: Position established
- Succeeded by: Stephen Jacob Jimbangan

Personal details
- Born: Ationg bin Tituh; 16 November 1959 Kuamut, Kinabatangan District, Crown Colony of North Borneo
- Died: 13 June 2025 (aged 65) Kinabatangan, Sabah, Malaysia
- Party: United People's Justice Front (AKAR) (1989–2001); Parti Gagasan Rakyat Sabah (GAGASAN) (2013–2025)
- Other political affiliations: Gabungan Rakyat Sabah (2023–2025)
- Occupation: Preacher; Teacher; Politician; Organization founder Organization manager (NGO); Political Analyst
- Known for: Founder and first president of GAGASAN Party

Ationg Tituh (16 November 1959 – 13 June 2025) was a Malaysian politician who established and founded the Parti Gagasan Rakyat Sabah (GAGASAN), and also the inaugural president of the local party since 28 August 2013 until 2021, later succeeded by Stephen Jacob Jimbangan. His political party was among the 20 official political parties registered in 2013. In 2023, his party was then taken over by incumbent chief minister and GRS Chairman Hajiji Noor and subsequently became the largest party in Sabah in terms of number of single party seats.

== Career ==
He began his political career as a member of United People's Justice Front (abbreviated as AKAR, later known as AKAR BERSATU) and became a political candidate in 1990 Sabah state election representing the AKAR Party for Kuamut. He was the main member of AKAR Party until 2001 where the party was fully dissolved. In 2009, he began to establish the Sabah Gagasan Rakyat Party as AKAR Party successor but the party only registered under Registrar of Societies 3 years later in 2013. He officially became an organization founder of the party in 2013 and he is very well known among Kinabatangan people as the "First-ever president" of the local party that is based in Kinabatangan (but headquartered in Kota Kinabalu). He was also a founder of several Sabahan local non-governmental organizations (NGOs) since 2014. From 2018 to 2020, he began his action to come back as political candidate for the Sabah elections after his party got well recognised after many contributions.

== Election results ==
Sabah State Legislative Assembly
Year	Constituency	Candidate	Votes	Pct	Opponent(s)	Votes	Pct	Ballots cast	Majority	Turnout
2020	N57 Kuamut	Ationg Tituh (GAGASAN)	270	3.77%	Masiung Banah (IND)	2,802	39.11%	7,164	978	72.70%
2020	N57 Kuamut	Ationg Tituh (GAGASAN)	270	3.77%	Bensom Inggam (UPKO)	1,824	25.47%	7,164	978	72.70%
2020	N57 Kuamut	Ationg Tituh (GAGASAN)	270	3.77%	Juhari Janan (UMNO)	1,547	21.59%	7,164	978	72.70%
2020	N57 Kuamut	Ationg Tituh (GAGASAN)	270	3.77%	Mohd Meszi Ng Abdullah (PCS)	721	10.06%	7,164	978	72.70%

== Honours ==
- Malaysia
  - Member of the Order of the Defender of the Realm (AMN) (2008)
