= Abdul Ghani Mohamed Yassin =

Malaysian politician

Yang Berhormat Datuk Abdul Ghani Mohamed Yassin PGDK KMN MLA
- عبدالغني محمد يسٓ

Chairman of the Sabah Land Development Board
- Incumbent
- Assumed office January 2021
- Governor: Juhar Mahiruddin (2021–2024); Musa Aman (since 2025)
- Chief Minister: Hajiji Noor

Member of the Sabah State Legislative Assembly for Nabawan
- Incumbent
- Assumed office 9 October 2020
- Preceded by: Bobbey Ah Fang Suan (PN–BERSATU)
- Majority: 2,238 (2020); 1,682 (2025)

Senator Elected by the Sabah State Legislative Assembly
- In office 5 January 2018 – 4 January 2021 Serving with Lucas Umbul (until December 2018); Donald Peter Mojuntin
- Monarchs: Muhammad V (2018–2019); Abdullah (2019–2021)
- Prime Minister: Najib Razak (2018); Mahathir Mohamad (2018–2020); Muhyiddin Yassin (2020–2021)
- Preceded by: Kadzim M. Yahya
- Succeeded by: Bobbey Ah Fang Suan

Personal details
- Born: Abdul Ghani Mohamed Yassin; 1960 (age 65–66)
- Citizenship: Malaysia
- Party: United Malays National Organisation of Sabah (Sabah UMNO) (until 2018); Independent (2018–2019); Malaysian United Indigenous Party of Sabah (Sabah BERSATU) (2019–2022); Parti Gagasan Rakyat Sabah (GAGASAN) (since 2023)
- Other political affiliations: Barisan Nasional (BN) (until 2018); Pakatan Harapan (PH) (2019–2020); Perikatan Nasional (PN) (2020–2022); Gabungan Rakyat Sabah (GRS) (since 2020)
- Spouse: Asiah @ Doreen Azlan
- Occupation: Politician

Abdul Ghani Mohamed Yassin is a Malaysian politician who has served as Chairman of the Sabah Land Development Board (SLDB) since January 2021, as well as Member of Sabah State Legislative Assembly for Nabawan since 2020 and previously served as a Senator representing Sabah from 2018 to 2021. He is a member of the Parti Gagasan Rakyat Sabah (GAGASAN), which is a major component of the ruling Gabungan Rakyat Sabah (GRS) coalition. He is formerly a member of the United Malays National Organisation of Sabah (Sabah UMNO), a branch of a component party of the Barisan Nasional (BN) coalition and formerly a member of Malaysian United Indigenous Party of Sabah (Sabah BERSATU), a former component party branch of the GRS coalition and component party of the Perikatan Nasional (PN) coalition.

== Election result ==
Sabah State Legislative Assembly
Year	Constituency	Candidate	Votes	Pct.	Opponent(s)	Votes	Pct.	Ballots cast	Majority	Turnout
2020	N46 Nabawan	Abdul Ghani Mohamed Yassin (BERSATU)	4,688	54.70%	Albert Aguir (UPKO)	2,450	28.58%	8,571	2,238	68.71%
2020	N46 Nabawan	Abdul Ghani Mohamed Yassin (BERSATU)	4,688	54.70%	Ampalus @ Robert Sanaron (PCS)	1,115	13.01%	8,571	2,238	68.71%
2020	N46 Nabawan	Abdul Ghani Mohamed Yassin (BERSATU)	4,688	54.70%	Maikol Ampuas (IND)	128	1.49%	8,571	2,238	68.71%
2025	N46 Nabawan	Abdul Ghani Mohamed Yassin (GAGASAN)	5,283	37.08%	Laiji Ompongoh (Sabah UMNO)	3,601	25.27%	14,457	1,682	61.86%
2025	N46 Nabawan	Abdul Ghani Mohamed Yassin (GAGASAN)	5,283	37.08%	Jekerison Kilan (KDM)	2,348	16.48%	14,457	1,682	61.86%
2025	N46 Nabawan	Abdul Ghani Mohamed Yassin (GAGASAN)	5,283	37.08%	Alfian Ahmad Koroh (WARISAN)	1,495	10.49%	14,457	1,682	61.86%
2025	N46 Nabawan	Abdul Ghani Mohamed Yassin (GAGASAN)	5,283	37.08%	Farney Akon (PKS)	780	5.47%	14,457	1,682	61.86%
2025	N46 Nabawan	Abdul Ghani Mohamed Yassin (GAGASAN)	5,283	37.08%	Junilin @ Jubilin Kilan (UPKO)	438	3.07%	14,457	1,682	61.86%
2025	N46 Nabawan	Abdul Ghani Mohamed Yassin (GAGASAN)	5,283	37.08%	Sayau Tangkap (Sabah BERSATU)	187	1.31%	14,457	1,682	61.86%
2025	N46 Nabawan	Abdul Ghani Mohamed Yassin (GAGASAN)	5,283	37.08%	Rejoh Ondoh (IMPIAN)	95	0.67%	14,457	1,682	61.86%
2025	N46 Nabawan	Abdul Ghani Mohamed Yassin (GAGASAN)	5,283	37.08%	Akuang Suan (STAR)	22	0.15%	14,457	1,682	61.86%

== Honours ==
- Malaysia
  - Officer of the Order of the Defender of the Realm (KMN) (2005)
- Sabah
  - Commander of the Order of Kinabalu (PGDK) – Datuk (2007)
