= Kuamut =

State constituency in Sabah, Malaysia

Kuamut (N57)
Sabah constituency

State constituency
- Legislature: Sabah State Legislative Assembly
MLA
Masiung Banah
GRS
- Constituency created: 1974
- First contested: 1974
- Last contested: 2025

Demographics
- Population (2020): 46,527
- Electors (2025): 18,228

Kuamut is a state constituency in Sabah, Malaysia, that is represented in the Sabah State Legislative Assembly.

== Demographics ==
As of 2020, Kuamut has a population of 46,527 people.

Ethnic breakdown of Kuamut's electorate as of 2025
1. Non-Muslim Bumiputera (73.0%)
2. Muslim Bumiputera (25.0%)
3. Chinese (2.00%)
4. Other ethnicities (0.00%)

== History ==
=== Polling districts ===
According to the gazette issued on 31 October 2022, the Kuamut constituency has a total of 10 polling districts.

State constituency	Polling Districts	Code	Location
Kuamut（N57）	Mananam	187/57/01	SK Menanam
Kuamut（N57）	Sogo-Sogo	187/57/02	SK Sogo-Sogo
Kuamut（N57）	Entilibon	187/57/03	SMK Entilibon
Kuamut（N57）	Karamuak	187/57/04	SK Karamuak
Kuamut（N57）	Kuamut	187/57/05	SK Kuamut
Kuamut（N57）	Tongod	187/57/06	SK Pekan Tongod
Kuamut（N57）	Penangah	187/57/07	SK Penangah
Kuamut（N57）	Masaum	187/57/08	SK Masaum
Kuamut（N57）	Inarad	187/57/09	SK Inarad
Kuamut（N57）	Saguan	187/57/10	SK Saguon

=== Representation history ===
Member of Sabah State Legislative Assembly for Kuamut
Assembly	No	Years	Member	Party
Constituency created from Lamag
5th	N30	1976	Abdul Malek Chua	BERJAYA
5th	N30	1976–1981	Abdul Malek Chua	BN (BERJAYA)
6th	N30	1981–1985	Abdul Malek Chua	BN (BERJAYA)
7th	N23	1985–1986	Abdul Malek Chua	BN (BERJAYA)
8th	N23	1986–1990	Joseph Sitin Saang	PBS
9th	N23	1990–1994	Joseph Sitin Saang	GR (PBS)
10th	N23	1994	Joseph Sitin Saang	GR (PBS)
10th	N23	1994–1999	Joseph Sitin Saang	BN (PDS)
11th	N40	1999–2002	Abdul Malek Chua	PBS
11th	N40	2002–2004	Abdul Malek Chua	BN (PBS)
12th	N47	2004–2008	Johnny @ Juni Intang	BN (UPKO)
13th	N47	2008–2013	Masiung Banah	BN (UPKO)
14th	N47	2013–2018	Masiung Banah	BN (UPKO)
15th	N47	2018	Masiung Banah	BN (UPKO)
15th	N47	2018	Masiung Banah	UPKO
15th	N47	2018	Masiung Banah	Independent
15th	N47	2018–2020	Masiung Banah	WARISAN
15th	N47	2020	Masiung Banah	Independent
16th	N57	2020–2023	Masiung Banah	Independent
16th	N57	2023–2025	Masiung Banah	GRS (GAGASAN)
17th	N57	2025–present	Masiung Banah	GRS (GAGASAN)

== Election results ==
Sabah state election, 2025: Kuamut
Party	Candidate	Votes	%	∆%
GRS	Masiung Banah	4,980	40.06	▲40.06
UPKO	Mohina Sidom	4,523	36.38	▲11.57
Heritage	Norfaizah Chua	1,694	13.63	▲13.63
Homeland Solidarity Party	Jevronnie Mandek	648	5.21	▲5.21
KDM	Abu Bakar Ellah	224	1.80	▲1.80
Sabah Dream Party	Ted Kelvin Sudin	224	1.80	▲1.80
Sabah People's Unity Party	John Sungkiang	107	0.86	▲0.86
Independent	Duin Daud Bintarang	32	0.26	▲0.26
Total valid votes		12,432		
Total rejected ballots		274		
Unreturned ballots		15		
Turnout		12,721	69.79	▼4.81
Registered electors		18,228		
Majority		457	3.68	▼9.63
GRS gain from Independent		Swing		?
Source(s) "RESULTS OF CONTESTED ELECTION AND STATEMENTS OF THE POLL AFTER THE OFFICIAL ADDITION OF VOTES" (PDF).

Sabah state election, 2020: Kuamut
Party	Candidate	Votes	%	∆%
Independent	Masiung Banah	2,802	38.12	▲38.12
UPKO	Benson Inggam	1,824	24.81	▲24.81
BN	Juhari Janan	1,547	21.04	▼36.02
Love Sabah Party	Mohd Mezsi Ng Abdullah	721	9.81	▲8.36
GAGASAN	Ationg Tituh	270	3.67	▲3.67
Total valid votes		7,164	97.46	
Total rejected ballots		176	2.39	
Unreturned ballots		11	0.15	
Turnout		7,351	74.60	▼4.24
Registered electors		9,854		
Majority		978	13.31	▼15.93
Independent gain from BN		Swing		-
Source(s) "RESULTS OF CONTESTED ELECTION AND STATEMENTS OF THE POLL AFTER THE OFFICIAL ADDITION OF VOTES".

Sabah state election, 2018: Kuamut
Party	Candidate	Votes	%	∆%
BN	Masiung Banah	8,042	57.06	▼5.44
Sabah Heritage Party	Norfaizah Chua	3,921	27.82	▲27.82
STAR	James Aik	1,132	8.03	▼4.80
PAS	Jumaidin Lakalla	330	2.34	▲2.34
Love Sabah Party	Edward Podok	205	1.45	▲1.45
Total valid votes		13,630	96.71	
Total rejected ballots		408	2.90	
Unreturned ballots		55	0.39	
Turnout		14,093	78.84	▼2.77
Registered electors		17,875		
Majority		4,121	29.24	▼8.70
BN hold		Swing		
Source(s) "RESULTS OF CONTESTED ELECTION AND STATEMENTS OF THE POLL AFTER THE OFFICIAL ADDITION OF VOTES".

Sabah state election, 2013: Kuamut
Party	Candidate	Votes	%	∆%
BN	Masiung Banah	7,607	62.50	▲13.15
PKR	Mustapa Tambuyong	2,989	24.56	▲9.65
STAR	Edward Podok	1,196	9.83	▲9.83
Total valid votes		11,712	96.88	
Total rejected ballots		350	2.88	
Unreturned ballots		30	0.25	
Turnout		12,172	81.61	▲14.28
Registered electors		14,915		
Majority		4,618	37.94	▲16.13
BN hold		Swing		
Source(s) "KEPUTUSAN PILIHAN RAYA UMUM DEWAN UNDANGAN NEGERI".

Sabah state election, 2008: Kuamut
Party	Candidate	Votes	%	∆%
BN	Masiung Banah	3,784	49.35	▼7.09
Independent	Mustapa Tambuyong	2,112	27.54	▲27.54
PKR	Abdul Razak Jamil	1,143	14.91	▲14.91
Independent	Duin @ Noor Bintarang	206	2.69	▲2.69
DAP	Jusing @ Geoffrey Sabran	105	1.37	▲1.37
Total valid votes		7,350	95.85	
Total rejected ballots		300	3.91	
Unreturned ballots		18	0.23	
Turnout		7,668	67.33	▲3.96
Registered electors		11,389		
Majority		1,672	21.81	▼10.20
BN hold		Swing		
Source(s) "KEPUTUSAN PILIHAN RAYA UMUM DEWAN UNDANGAN NEGERI SABAH BAGI TAHUN 2008".

Sabah state election, 2004: Kuamut
Party	Candidate	Votes	%	∆%
BN	Johnny @ Juni Intang	3,897	56.44	▼4.62
Independent	Ali Latip Taha	1,687	24.43	▲24.43
Independent	Abdullah Abdul Sani	814	11.79	▲11.79
Independent	Abu Bakar Ellah	322	4.66	▲4.66
PASOK	Damsah Kalbin	49	0.71	▲0.71
Total valid votes		6,769	98.03	
Total rejected ballots		136	1.97	
Unreturned ballots		0	0.00	
Turnout		6,905	63.37	▼9.16
Registered electors		10,897		
Majority		2,210	32.01	▲25.24
BN gain		Swing		
Source(s) "KEPUTUSAN PILIHAN RAYA UMUM DEWAN UNDANGAN NEGERI SABAH BAGI TAHUN 2004".

Sabah state election, 1999: Kuamut
Party	Candidate	Votes	%	∆%
PBS	Abdul Malek Chua	3,286	43.72	▼11.66
BN	Joseph Sitin Saang	2,777	36.95	▲0.21
BERSEKUTU	Ali Latip Taha	1,371	18.24	▲18.24
Total valid votes		7,434	98.91	
Total rejected ballots		82	1.09	
Unreturned ballots		0	0.00	
Turnout		7,516	72.53	▲0.19
Registered electors		10,362		
Majority		509	6.77	▼11.87
PBS hold		Swing		
Source(s) "KEPUTUSAN PILIHAN RAYA UMUM DEWAN UNDANGAN NEGERI SABAH BAGI TAHUN 1999".

Sabah state election, 1994: Kuamut
Party	Candidate	Votes	%	∆%
PBS	Joseph Sitin Saang	2,184	55.38	▲1.66
BN	Bung Moktar Radin	1,449	36.74	▲15.10
Independent	Ali Latip Taha	258	6.54	▲6.54
Total valid votes		3,891	98.66	
Total rejected ballots		53	1.34	
Unreturned ballots		0	0.00	
Turnout		3,944	72.34	▲2.70
Registered electors		5,452		
Majority		735	18.64	▼13.47
PBS hold		Swing		
Source(s) "KEPUTUSAN PILIHAN RAYA UMUM DEWAN UNDANGAN NEGERI SABAH BAGI TAHUN 1994".

Sabah state election, 1990: Kuamut
Party	Candidate	Votes	%	∆%
PBS	Joseph Sitin Saang	1,762	53.72	▼1.52
BERJAYA	Marhumah Basrah	709	21.61	▼24.58
USNO	Ali Latip Taha	459	13.99	▲13.99
AKAR	Ationg Tituh	148	4.51	▲4.51
Sabah People's Party	Abdul Mait Akmad Halim	142	4.33	▲4.33
Total valid votes		3,220	98.17	
Total rejected ballots		60	1.83	
Unreturned ballots		0	0.00	
Turnout		3,280	69.64	▲10.64
Registered electors		4,710		
Majority		1,053	32.11	▲26.10
Kuamut hold		Swing		PBS
Source(s) "KEPUTUSAN PILIHAN RAYA UMUM DEWAN UNDANGAN NEGERI SABAH BAGI TAHUN 1990".

Sabah state election, 1986: Kuamut
Party	Candidate	Votes	%	∆%
PBS	Joseph Sitin Saang	1,694	52.20	▲15.83
BERJAYA	Abdul Malek Chua	1,499	46.19	▲2.418
Total valid votes		3,193	100.00	
Total rejected ballots		52		
Unreturned ballots		0		
Turnout		3,245	59.00	▲6.00
Registered electors		5,500		
Majority		195	6.11	▼1.23
PBS gain from BERJAYA		Swing		▲16.68

Sabah state election, 1985: Kuamut
Party	Candidate	Votes	%	∆%
BERJAYA	Abdul Malek Chua	1,066	43.71	▼46.11
PBS	Joseph Sitin Saang	887	36.37	▲36.37
USNO	Mohd. Kalbani Kalbin	336	13.78	▲13.78
BERSIH	Hamid Jan	93	3.81	▲3.81
BERSEPADU	Amir Ali Mohd Damit	42	1.72	▲1.72
Independent	Manap Omboi	15	0.61	▲0.61
Total valid votes		2,439	100.00	
Total rejected ballots		85		
Unreturned ballots		0		
Turnout		2,524	53.00	▼19.00
Registered electors		4,724		
Majority		179	7.34	▼76.47
BERJAYA hold		Swing		

Sabah state election, 1981: Kuamut
Party	Candidate	Votes	%	∆%
BERJAYA	Abdul Malek Chua	2,336	89.81	▲29.50
Independent	Hamid Jan	156	6.00	▲6.00
PASOK	Fred E. Sikal	109	4.19	▲4.19
Total valid votes		2,601	100.00	
Total rejected ballots		25		
Unreturned ballots		0		
Turnout		2,626	72.00	▲4.00
Registered electors		3,662		
Majority		2,180	83.81	▲63.18
BERJAYA hold		Swing		

Sabah state election, 1976: Kuamut
Party	Candidate	Votes	%
BERJAYA	Abdul Malek Chua	1,339	60.32
USNO	Penglima Ali O.K.K. Harun	881	39.68
Total valid votes		2,220	100.00
Total rejected ballots		135	
Unreturned ballots		0	
Turnout		2,355	68.00
Registered electors		3,466	
Majority		458	20.63
This was a new constituency created.
