= Sulaman =

State constituency in Sabah, Malaysia

Sulaman (N12)
Sabah constituency

State constituency
- Legislature: Sabah State Legislative Assembly
MLA
Hajiji Noor
GRS
- Constituency created: 1967
- First contested: 1967
- Last contested: 2025

Demographics
- Electors (2025): 18,352

Sulaman is a state constituency in Sabah, Malaysia, that has been represented in the Sabah State Legislative Assembly. It is mandated to return a single member to the Assembly under the first-past-the-post voting system.

== Demographics ==
As of 2020, Sulaman has a population of 30,088 people.

Ethnic breakdown of Sulaman's electorate as of 2025
1. Muslim Bumiputera (81.0%)
2. Non-Muslim Bumiputera (17.0%)
3. Chinese (2.00%)
4. Other ethnicities (0.00%)

== History ==
=== Polling districts ===
According to the gazette issued on 31 October 2022, the Sulaman constituency has a total of 7 polling districts.

State constituency	Polling Districts	Code	Location
Sulaman (N12）	Penimbawan	170/12/01	SK Penimbawan
Sulaman (N12）	Serusup	170/12/02	SK Serusup
Sulaman (N12）	Kindu	170/12/03	SK Selupoh; SK Kindu; SMK St. John; SMK Sri Nangka
Sulaman (N12）	Indai	170/12/04	SK Termunong
Sulaman (N12）	Batangan	170/12/05	SK Pekan Tuaran
Sulaman (N12）	Tambalang	170/12/06	SK Tambalang; SK Bolong
Sulaman (N12）	Baru-Baru	170/12/07	SK Baru-Baru

=== Representation history ===
Member of Sabah State Legislative Assembly for Sulaman
Assembly	No	Years	Member	Party
Constituency created
3rd	N07	1967 – 1971	Indan Kari	Alliance (USNO)
4th	N07	1971 – 1976	Dahlan Harun	Alliance (USNO)
5th	N13	1976 – 1981	Jumah Salim	Alliance (USNO)
6th	N13	1981 – 1985	Nawawi Budin	BN (BERJAYA)
7th	N11	1985 – 1986	Abdul Hamid Mustapha	USNO
8th	N11	1986	Osu Sukam	USNO
8th	N11	1986 – 1990	Jasni Gindug	USNO
9th	N11	1990 – 1994	Hajiji Noor	BN (USNO)
10th	N11	1994 – 1999	Hajiji Noor	BN (UMNO)
11th	N10	1999 – 2004	Hajiji Noor	BN (UMNO)
12th	N10	2004 – 2008	Hajiji Noor	BN (UMNO)
13th	N10	2008 – 2013	Hajiji Noor	BN (UMNO)
14th	N10	2013 – 2018	Hajiji Noor	BN (UMNO)
15th	N10	2018	Hajiji Noor	BN (UMNO)
15th	N10	2018 - 2019	Hajiji Noor	Independent
15th	N10	2019 – 2020	Hajiji Noor	PH (BERSATU)
15th	N10	2020	Hajiji Noor	PN (BERSATU)
16th	N12	2020 – 2022	Hajiji Noor	GRS (BERSATU)
16th	N12	2022-2023	Hajiji Noor	GRS (Direct)
16th	N12	2023–2025	Hajiji Noor	GRS (GAGASAN)
17th	N12	2025–present	Hajiji Noor	GRS (GAGASAN)

== Election results ==
Sabah state election, 2025: Sulaman
Party	Candidate	Votes	%	∆%
GRS	Hajiji Noor	10,639	73.63	▲73.63
BN	Shahnon Rizal Thaijuddin	1,720	11.90	▲11.90
Heritage	Mokhtar Hussin	1,383	9.57	▼21.17
PN	Tiaminah @ Siti Aminah Ele	385	2.66	▼61.86
Sabah Dream Party	Pajudin Nordin	322	2.23	▲2.23
Total valid votes		14,449		
Total rejected ballots		171		
Unreturned ballots		19		
Turnout		14,639	79.77	▲1.43
Registered electors		18,352		
Majority		8,919	61.73	▲27.95
GRS gain from PN		Swing		?
Source(s) "RESULTS OF CONTESTED ELECTION AND STATEMENTS OF THE POLL AFTER THE OFFICIAL ADDITION OF VOTES" (PDF).

Sabah state election, 2020: Sulaman
Party	Candidate	Votes	%	∆%
PN	Hajiji Noor	5,919	64.52	▲64.52
Sabah Heritage Party	Aliasgar Basri	2,820	30.74	▲3.49
Love Sabah Party	Rekan Hussien	253	2.76	▲2.76
Total valid votes		8,992	98.02	
Total rejected ballots		142	1.55	
Unreturned ballots		40	0.44	
Turnout		9,174	78.34	▼5.93
Registered electors		11,711		
Majority		3,099	33.78	▼7.02
PN gain from BN		Swing		?
Source(s) "RESULTS OF CONTESTED ELECTION AND STATEMENTS OF THE POLL AFTER THE OFFICIAL ADDITION OF VOTES".

Sabah state election, 2018: Sulaman
Party	Candidate	Votes	%	∆%
BN	Hajiji Noor	12,966	68.05	▼8.51
Sabah Heritage Party	Abdullah Sani Daud	5,192	27.25	▲27.25
Sabah People's Hope Party	Arifin Harith	467	2.76	▲2.76
Total valid votes		18,625	97.99	
Total rejected ballots		341	1.85	
Unreturned ballots		89	0.16	
Turnout		19,055	84.27	▼2.83
Registered electors		22,611		
Majority		7,774	40.80	▼20.38
BN hold		Swing		
Source(s) "RESULTS OF CONTESTED ELECTION AND STATEMENTS OF THE POLL AFTER THE OFFICIAL ADDITION OF VOTES".

Sabah state election, 2013: Sulaman
Party	Candidate	Votes	%	∆%
BN	Hajiji Noor	13,065	76.56	▲6.39
PKR	Gulabdin @ Ghulabdin Enjih	2,624	15.38	▼12.07
Independent	Ali Akbar Kawi	615	3.60	▲3.60
STAR	David Orok	225	1.32	▲1.32
Independent	Arifin Harith	66	0.39	▲0.39
Total valid votes		16,595	97.24	
Total rejected ballots		449	2.63	
Unreturned ballots		22	0.13	
Turnout		17,066	87.10	▲7.66
Registered electors		19,587		
Majority		10,441	61.18	▲18.46
BN hold		Swing		
Source(s) "KEPUTUSAN PILIHAN RAYA UMUM DEWAN UNDANGAN NEGERI".

Sabah state election, 2008: Sulaman
Party	Candidate	Votes	%	∆%
BN	Hajiji Noor	8,961	70.17	▲5.94
PKR	Umsery @ Ansari Abdullah	3,505	27.45	▼5.12
Total valid votes		12,466	97.62	
Total rejected ballots		304	2.38	
Unreturned ballots		0	0.00	
Turnout		12,770	79.44	▲6.90
Registered electors		16,076		
Majority		5,456	42.72	▲11.06
BN hold		Swing		
Source(s) "KEPUTUSAN PILIHAN RAYA UMUM DEWAN UNDANGAN NEGERI SABAH BAGI TAHUN 2008".

Sabah state election, 2004: Sulaman
Party	Candidate	Votes	%	∆%
BN	Hajiji Noor	7,065	64.23	▲3.38
PKR	Umsery @ Ansari Abdullah	3,583	32.57	▲32.57
Total valid votes		10,648	96.80	
Total rejected ballots		349	3.17	
Unreturned ballots		3	0.03	
Turnout		11,000	72.54	▼4.77
Registered electors		15,165		
Majority		3,482	31.66	▼0.23
BN hold		Swing		
Source(s) "KEPUTUSAN PILIHAN RAYA UMUM DEWAN UNDANGAN NEGERI SABAH BAGI TAHUN 2004".

Sabah state election, 1999: Sulaman
Party	Candidate	Votes	%	∆%
BN	Hajiji Noor	6,571	60.85	▲7.29
PBS	Rakam Sijim	3,127	28.96	▼15.25
BERSEKUTU	Mohammed Daud Abdullah	886	8.20	▲8.20
SETIA	Hamdin @ Din Abdul Kadir	100	0.93	▲0.29
Total valid votes		10,684	98.94	
Total rejected ballots		115	1.06	
Unreturned ballots		0	0.00	
Turnout		10,799	77.31	▼2.25
Registered electors		13,968		
Majority		3,444	31.89	▲22.54
BN hold		Swing		
Source(s) "KEPUTUSAN PILIHAN RAYA UMUM DEWAN UNDANGAN NEGERI SABAH BAGI TAHUN 1999".

Sabah state election, 1994: Sulaman
Party	Candidate	Votes	%	∆%
BN	Hajiji Noor	5,016	53.56	▲53.56
PBS	Marbee Ismail @ Matbeh Ismail	4,140	44.21	▲4.05
Independent	Pengiran Othman Rauf @ Awang	69	0.74	▲0.74
SETIA	Margaret Kimon @ Marsie	60	0.64	▲0.64
Total valid votes		9,285	99.15	
Total rejected ballots		80	0.85	
Unreturned ballots		0	0.00	
Turnout		9,365	79.56	▼0.46
Registered electors		11,771		
Majority		876	9.35	▲5.62
BN gain from USNO		Swing		?
Source(s) "KEPUTUSAN PILIHAN RAYA UMUM DEWAN UNDANGAN NEGERI SABAH BAGI TAHUN 1994".

Sabah state election, 1990: Sulaman
Party	Candidate	Votes	%	∆%
USNO	Hajiji Noor	3,575	43.89	▼1.36
PBS	Jahid Jahim	3,294	40.16	▲1.17
AKAR	Kalakau Untol	565	6.89	▲6.89
BERJAYA	Aliasgar Basri	538	6.56	▼3.55
PRS	Shafie Anterak	120	1.46	▲1.46
Independent	Yusof Awang Ludin	38	0.46	▲0.46
Independent	Laugan Tarki Noor	11	0.13	▲0.13
Total valid votes		8,141	99.26	
Total rejected ballots		61	0.74	
Unreturned ballots		0	0.00	
Turnout		8,202	80.02	▲3.31
Registered electors		10,250		
Majority		281	3.73	▼2.53
USNO hold		Swing		
Source(s) "KEPUTUSAN PILIHAN RAYA UMUM DEWAN UNDANGAN NEGERI SABAH BAGI TAHUN 1990".

Sabah state election, 1986: Sulaman
Party	Candidate	Votes	%	∆%
USNO	Osu Sukam	2,913	45.65	▼0.23
PBS	Mohd Abdul Rahman @ Ahmad I Onggohon	2,510	39.34	▲11.60
BERJAYA	Mungkit Ampuling @ Michael M Ampuling	651	10.20	▲10.20
Independent	Nawawi Budin	212	3.32	▲3.32
Independent	Bigong Polinoh @ Albert Polinoh	80	1.25	▲1.25
Independent	A Tanjong Hakim @ Mike	15	0.24	▲0.24
Total valid votes		6,381	100.00	
Total rejected ballots		56		
Unreturned ballots		0		
Turnout		6,437	76.71	▼0.24
Registered electors		8,391		
Majority		403	6.32	▼11.82
USNO hold		Swing		
Source(s) "KEPUTUSAN PILIHAN RAYA UMUM DEWAN UNDANGAN NEGERI SABAH BAGI TAHUN 1986".

Sabah state election, 1985: Sulaman
Party	Candidate	Votes	%	∆%
USNO	Abdul Hamid Mustapha	2,678	45.88	▲0.09
PBS	Patrick Jilas	1,619	27.74	▲27.74
BN	Ansari Abdullah	1,428	24.46	▼27.23
BERSIH	Aning Atam	50	0.86	▲0.86
BERSEPADU	Rastam Bodon	37	0.63	▲0.63
Independent	Madrus Yunus	25	0.43	▼0.15
Total valid votes		5,837	100.00	
Total rejected ballots		83		
Unreturned ballots		0		
Turnout		5,920	76.95	▼3.09
Registered electors		7,693		
Majority		1,059	18.14	▲12.24
USNO gain from BN		Swing		-

Sabah state election, 1981: Sulaman
Party	Candidate	Votes	%	∆%
BN	Nawawi Budin	2,838	51.69	▲14.64
USNO	Ansari Abdullah	2,514	45.79	▼13.56
Independent	Dayang Fatimah Laiman Diki	61	1.11	▲1.11
PUSAKA	Mohd. Yusof Othman	45	0.82	▲0.82
Independent	Alias Nasip	32	0.58	▲0.58
Total valid votes		5,490	100.00	
Total rejected ballots		51		
Unreturned ballots		0		
Turnout		5,541	80.04	▼1.73
Registered electors		6,923		
Majority		324	5.90	▼16.40
BN gain from Alliance		Swing		-

Sabah state election, 1976: Sulaman
Party	Candidate	Votes	%	∆%
USNO	Jumah Sallim	2,925	59.35	
BERJAYA	Nawawi Budin	1,826	37.05	
PEKEMAS	Mohamed Abdul Rahman	177	3.59	
Total valid votes		4,928	100.00	
Total rejected ballots		92		
Unreturned ballots		0		
Turnout		5,020	81.77	
Registered electors		6,139		
Majority		1,099	22.30	
USNO hold		Swing		

Sabah state election, 1971: Sulaman
Party	Candidate	Votes	%	∆%
On the nomination day, Dahlan Harun won uncontested.
USNO	Dahlan Harun			
Total valid votes				
Total rejected ballots				
Unreturned ballots				
Turnout				
Registered electors		0		
Majority				
USNO hold		Swing		

Sabah state election, 1967: Sulaman
Party	Candidate	Votes	%
USNO	OKK Indan Kari	4,644	70.93
UPKO	Wong John Joenoi	1,903	29.07
Total valid votes		6,547	100.00
Total rejected ballots		114	
Unreturned ballots		0	
Turnout		6,661	91.35
Registered electors		7,292	
Majority		2,741	41.87
This was a new constituency created
