= Tawfiq Titingan =

Malaysian politician

Yang Berhormat Datuk Tawfiq Abu Bakar Titingan
- توفيق أبو بكر تيتيڠن

State Minister of Youth and Sports of Sabah
- In office 9 May 2013 – 14 March 2018
- Governor: Juhar Mahiruddin
- Chief Minister: Musa Aman
- Preceded by: Peter Pang En Yin
- Succeeded by: Frankie Poon Ming Fung
- Constituency: Apas

Sabah State Assistant Minister of Finance
- In office 19 March 2008 – 3 April 2013
- Governor: Ahmadshah Abdullah; Juhar Mahiruddin
- Chief Minister: Musa Aman
- Preceded by: Sapawi Ahmad
- Succeeded by: Ramlee Marahaban & Michael Metah Asang
- Constituency: Apas

Sabah State Assistant Minister of Rural Development
- In office 27 March 2004 – 19 March 2008
- Governor: Ahmadshah Abdullah
- Chief Minister: Musa Aman
- Preceded by: Masrani Parman & Norjan Khan Bahadar
- Succeeded by: Sairin Karno
- Constituency: Apas
- Minister: Joseph Pairin Kitingan

Member of the Sabah State Legislative Assembly for Apas
- In office 21 March 2004 – 14 March 2018
- Preceded by: New constituency
- Succeeded by: Nizam Abu Bakar Titingan (BN–UMNO)

Faction represented in the Sabah State Legislative Assembly
- 2004–2018: Barisan Nasional

Personal details
- Born: Tawfiq bin Abu Bakar Titingan; 12 October 1963 Tawau, Sabah, Malaysia
- Died: 14 March 2018 (aged 54) Kuala Lumpur, Malaysia
- Citizenship: Malaysia
- Party: United Malays National Organisation of Sabah (Sabah UMNO)
- Other political affiliations: Barisan Nasional (BN)
- Relations: Nizam Abu Bakar Titingan (Younger brother)
- Parent(s): Datuk Seri Panglima Haji Abu Bakar Titingan Damsani; Datin Seri Panglima Hajah Kee Hafsah Kee Sulaiman
- Occupation: Politician

Tawfiq bin Abu Bakar Titingan (12 October 1963 – 14 March 2018) was a Malaysian politician who had served as the State Minister of Youth and Sports of Sabah from May 2013 to his death in office in March 2018 in the Barisan Nasional (BN) state administration under Chief Minister Musa Aman and Member of the Sabah State Legislative Assembly (MLA) for Apas from March 2004 to his aforementioned death.

He has 12 siblings, several of them (Ahmad Bahrom and Nizam were also politicians, whilst Salwa was a civil servant). He died of colorectal cancer at the Prince Court Medical Centre in Kuala Lumpur on 14 March 2018, aged 54.

== Honours ==
- Sabah
  - Commander of the Order of Kinabalu (PGDK) – Datuk (2003)
