= Membakut (state constituency) =

Membakut (N31)
Sabah constituency

State constituency
- Legislature: Sabah State Legislative Assembly
MLA
Mohd. Arifin Mohd. Arif
GRS
- Constituency created: 2004
- First contested: 2004
- Last contested: 2025

Demographics
- Population (2020): 18,564
- Electors (2025): 18,563

Membakut is a state constituency in Sabah, Malaysia, that is represented in the Sabah State Legislative Assembly.

== Demographics ==
As of 2020, Membakut has a population of 18,564 people.

Ethnic breakdown of Membakut's electorate as of 2025
1. Muslim Bumiputera (69.0%)
2. Non-Muslim Bumiputera (27.0%)
3. Chinese (4.00%)
4. Other ethnicities (0.00%)

== History ==
=== Poling districts ===
According to the gazette issued on 31 October 2022, the Membakut constituency has a total of 9 polling districts.

State constituency	Poling Districts	Code	Location
Membakut (N31)	Binsulok	176/31/01	SK Binsulok
Membakut (N31)	Pimping	176/31/02	SMK Membakut II
Membakut (N31)	Brunei	176/31/03	SK Kg. Brunei
Membakut (N31)	Bandau	176/31/04	SK Bandau; SK St. Patrick
Membakut (N31)	Membakut	176/31/05	SMK Membakut
Membakut (N31)	Lumat	176/31/06	SK Lumat
Membakut (N31)	Mawao	176/31/07	SMK St. Patrick
Membakut (N31)	Sinuka	176/31/08	SK Sinoko
Membakut (N31)	Dindong	176/31/09	SK Kg. Bambangan

=== Representation history ===
Member of Sabah State Legislative Assembly for Membakut
Assembly	No	Years	Member	Party
Constituency created from Bongawan, Klias and Kuala Penyu
12th	N23	2004 – 2008	Mohd. Arifin Mohd. Arif	BN (UMNO)
13th	N23	2008 – 2013	Mohd. Arifin Mohd. Arif	BN (UMNO)
14th	N23	2013 – 2018	Mohd. Arifin Mohd. Arif	BN (UMNO)
15th	N23	2018	Mohd. Arifin Mohd. Arif	BN (UMNO)
15th	N23	2018 – 2019	Mohd. Arifin Mohd. Arif	Independent
15th	N23	2019 – 2020	Mohd. Arifin Mohd. Arif	PH (BERSATU)
15th	N23	2020	Mohd. Arifin Mohd. Arif	PN (BERSATU)
16th	N30	2020 – 2022	Mohd. Arifin Mohd. Arif	GRS (BERSATU)
16th	N30	2022- 2023	Mohd. Arifin Mohd. Arif	GRS (Direct)
16th	N30	2023–2025	Mohd. Arifin Mohd. Arif	GRS (GAGASAN)
17th	N30	2025–present	Mohd. Arifin Mohd. Arif	GRS (GAGASAN)

== Election results ==
Sabah state election, 2025
Party	Candidate	Votes	%	∆%
GRS	Mohd. Arifin Mohd. Arif	5,668	39.95	▲39.95
BN	Rusman Dulamit	3,651	25.73	▲25.73
Heritage	Mohamad Said @ Ismail Said	2,199	15.50	▼12.20
UPKO	Rowindy Lawrence Odong	1,788	12.60	▲12.60
Homeland Solidarity Party	Adrian Lajim	324	2.28	▲2.28
Sabah Native Co-operation Party	Yahya Ahmad	278	1.96	▲1.96
Independent	Haslan Wasli	152	1.07	▲1.07
Sabah Dream Party	Kamal Idris	67	0.47	▲0.47
Sabah People's Unity Party	Aziz Angkiu @ Jaafar	38	0.27	▲0.27
Sabah Nationality Party	Suliaman Alladad	23	0.16	▲0.16
Total valid votes		14,188		
Total rejected ballots		123		
Unreturned ballots		19		
Turnout		14,330	77.20	▼0.79
Registered electors		18,563		
Majority		2,017	14.22	▼18.00
GRS gain from PN		Swing		-
Source(s) "RESULTS OF CONTESTED ELECTION AND STATEMENTS OF THE POLL AFTER THE OFFICIAL ADDITION OF VOTES" (PDF).

Sabah state election, 2020
Party	Candidate	Votes	%	∆%
PN	Mohd. Arifin Mohd. Arif	6,363	59.92	▲59.92
Sabah Heritage Party	Mohd Kamaruddin Abdul Hamid	2,942	27.70	▼7.68
Independent	Ag Duramin Tafa	588	5.54	▲5.54
Love Sabah Party	Saat Ag Damit	526	4.95	▲3.02
USNO (Baru)	Seniati Abdul Ghani	63	0.59	▲0.59
Total valid votes		10,482	98.70	
Total rejected ballots		119	1.12	
Unreturned ballots		19	0.18	
Turnout		10,620	77.99	▼8.45
Registered electors		13,617		
Majority		3,421	32.22	▲11.44
PN gain from BN		Swing		?
Source(s) "RESULTS OF CONTESTED ELECTION AND STATEMENTS OF THE POLL AFTER THE OFFICIAL ADDITION OF VOTES".

Sabah state election, 2018
Party	Candidate	Votes	%	∆%
BN	Mohd. Arifin Mohd. Arif	6,495	56.16	▼7.53
Sabah Heritage Party	Abdul Sani Sarip @ Marif	4,092	35.38	▲35.38
Sabah People's Hope Party	Ali Omar Mohd Idris	456	3.94	▲3.94
Love Sabah Party	Yahya Ahmad	223	1.93	▲1.93
Independent	Rosjelen Salimat	85	0.73	▲0.73
Total valid votes		11,351	98.15	
Total rejected ballots		182	1.57	
Unreturned ballots		32	0.28	
Turnout		11,565	86.44	▼0.86
Registered electors		13,379		
Majority		862	20.78	▼13.36
BN hold		Swing		
Source(s) "RESULTS OF CONTESTED ELECTION AND STATEMENTS OF THE POLL AFTER THE OFFICIAL ADDITION OF VOTES".

Sabah state election, 2013
Party	Candidate	Votes	%	∆%
BN	Mohd. Arifin Mohd. Arif	6,547	63.69	▼8.02
PKR	Narawi @ Sinar Ahmad	3,037	29.55	▲3.54
SAPP	Banjimin Ondoi	300	2.92	▲2.92
STAR	Jaapar Ag Gador	139	1.35	▲1.35
Total valid votes		10,023	97.51	
Total rejected ballots		237	2.31	
Unreturned ballots		19	0.18	
Turnout		10,279	87.30	▲9.57
Registered electors		11,777		
Majority		3,510	34.14	▼11.56
BN hold		Swing		
Source(s) "KEPUTUSAN PILIHAN RAYA UMUM DEWAN UNDANGAN NEGERI".

Sabah state election, 2008
Party	Candidate	Votes	%	∆%
BN	Mohd. Arifin Mohd. Arif	5,490	71.71	▲11.53
PKR	Awang Tangah Awang Amin	1,991	26.01	▼7.69
Total valid votes		7,481	97.71	
Total rejected ballots		168	2.19	
Unreturned ballots		7	0.09	
Turnout		7,656	77.73	▲7.44
Registered electors		9,850		
Majority		3,499	45.70	▲19.49
BN hold		Swing		
Source(s) "KEPUTUSAN PILIHAN RAYA UMUM DEWAN UNDANGAN NEGERI SABAH BAGI TAHUN 2008".

Sabah state election, 2004
Party	Candidate	Votes	%
BN	Mohd. Arifin Mohd. Arif	4,003	60.18
PKR	Awang Tangah Awang Amin	2,260	33.97
Total valid votes		6,263	94.15
Total rejected ballots		149	2.24
Unreturned ballots		240	3.61
Turnout		6,652	70.29
Registered electors		9,463	
Majority		1,743	26.21
This was a new constituency created.
Source(s) "KEPUTUSAN PILIHAN RAYA UMUM DEWAN UNDANGAN NEGERI SABAH BAGI TAHUN 2004".
