= Nabawan (state constituency) =

State constituency in Sabah, Malaysia

Nabawan (N46)
Sabah constituency

State constituency
- Legislature: Sabah State Legislative Assembly
MLA
Abdul Ghani Mohamed Yassin
GRS
- Constituency created: 1974
- Constituency abolished: 1994
- Constituency re-created: 2003
- First contested: 1974
- Last contested: 2025

Demographics
- Population (2020): 29,273
- Electors (2025): 23,392

Nabawan is a state constituency in Sabah, Malaysia, that is represented in the Sabah State Legislative Assembly.

== Demographics ==
As of 2020, Nabawan has a population of 29,273 people.

Ethnic breakdown of Nabawan's electorate as of 2025
1. Non-Muslim Bumiputera (82.0%)
2. Muslim Bumiputera (17.0%)
3. Chinese (0.50%)
4. Other ethnicities (0.50%)

== History ==
=== Polling districts ===
According to the gazette issued on 31 October 2022, the Nabawan constituency has a total of 15 polling districts.

| State constituency | Polling Districts | Code | Location |
|---|---|---|---|
| Nabawan（N46） | Nabawan | 182/46/01 | SK Pekan Nabawan; SMK Nabawa; SK Kebu Baru; SK Kg Bahagia |
| Nabawan（N46） | Pandewan | 182/46/02 | SK Pandiwan |
| Nabawan（N46） | Ponontomon | 182/46/03 | SK Ponontomon |
| Nabawan（N46） | Saliu | 182/46/04 | SK Pengaraan |
| Nabawan（N46） | Sabinait | 182/46/05 | SK Kuala Salong |
| Nabawan（N46） | Sapulot | 182/46/06 | SMK Sepulot Nabawan |
| Nabawan（N46） | Tataluan | 182/46/07 | SK Labang |
| Nabawan（N46） | Saliku | 182/46/08 | SK Saliku |
| Nabawan（N46） | Longongon | 182/46/09 | SK Longongon |
| Nabawan（N46） | Pensiangan | 182/46/10 | SK Pekan Pensiangan |
| Nabawan（N46） | Sibangali | 182/46/11 | SK Sibangali |
| Nabawan（N46） | Pohon Batu | 182/46/12 | SK Pohon Batu |
| Nabawan（N46） | Salinatan | 182/46/13 | SK Salinatan |
| Nabawan（N46） | Babalitan | 182/46/14 | SK Babalitan |
| Nabawan（N46） | Saliliran | 182/46/15 | SK Saliliran |

=== Representation history ===
Member of Sabah State Legislative Assembly for Nabawan
| Assembly | No | Years | Member | Party |
Constituency created from Pensiangan
| 7th | N42 | 1985–1986 | Adut Sigoh @ Joe Said Besar | PBS |
| 8th | N42 | 1986–1990 | Adut Sigoh @ Joe Said Besar | PBS |
| 9th | N42 | 1990–1994 | Adut Sigoh @ Joe Said Besar | GR (PBS) |
| 10th | N42 | 1994–1999 | Adut Sigoh @ Joe Said Besar | GR (PBS) |
| 10th | N42 | 1994–1997 | Adut Sigoh @ Joe Said Besar | BN (UMNO) |
| 10th | N42 | 1997–1999 | Adut Sigoh @ Joe Said Besar | BN (PBRS) |
Constituency merged into Pensiangan
Constituency re-created from Pensiangan
| 12th | N38 | 2004 – 2008 | Bobbey Ah Fang Suan | BN (UPKO) |
| 13th | N38 | 2008 – 2013 | Bobbey Ah Fang Suan | BN (UPKO) |
| 14th | N38 | 2013 – 2018 | Bobbey Ah Fang Suan | BN (UPKO) |
| 15th | N38 | 2018 | Bobbey Ah Fang Suan | BN (UPKO) |
| 15th | N38 | 2018 | Bobbey Ah Fang Suan | UPKO |
| 15th | N38 | 2018 – 2019 | Bobbey Ah Fang Suan | Independent |
| 15th | N38 | 2019 – 2020 | Bobbey Ah Fang Suan | PH (BERSATU) |
| 15th | N38 | 2020 | Bobbey Ah Fang Suan | PN (BERSATU) |
| 16th | N46 | 2020 – 2022 | Abdul Ghani Mohamed Yassin | GRS (BERSATU) |
| 16th | N46 | 2022 - 2023 | Abdul Ghani Mohamed Yassin | GRS (Direct) |
| 16th | N46 | 2023–2025 | Abdul Ghani Mohamed Yassin | GRS (GAGASAN) |
| 17th | N46 | 2025–present | Abdul Ghani Mohamed Yassin | GRS (GAGASAN) |

== Election results ==
Sabah state election, 2025
| Party | Candidate | Votes | % | ∆% |
|---|---|---|---|---|
| GRS | Abdul Ghani Mohamed Yassin | 5,283 | 37.08 | ▲37.08 |
| BN | Laiji Ompongoh | 3,601 | 25.27 | ▲25.27 |
| KDM | Jekerison Kilan @ Kilam | 2,348 | 16.48 | ▲16.48 |
| Heritage | Alfian Ahmad Koroh | 1,495 | 10.49 | ▲10.49 |
| Sabah Nationality Party | Farney Akon | 780 | 5.47 | ▲5.47 |
| UPKO | Junilin @ Jubilin Kilan | 438 | 3.07 | ▼25.11 |
| PN | Sayap Tangkap | 187 | 1.31 | ▼53.39 |
| Sabah Dream Party | Rejoh Ondoh | 95 | 0.67 | ▲0.67 |
| Homeland Solidarity Party | Akuang Suan | 22 | 0.15 | ▲0.15 |
| Total valid votes | | 14,249 | | |
| Total rejected ballots | | 208 | | |
| Unreturned ballots | | 13 | | |
| Turnout | | 14,470 | 61.86 | ▼6.85 |
| Registered electors | | 23,392 | | |
| Majority | | 1,682 | 11.81 | ▼14.31 |
| GRS gain from PN | | Swing | | ? |
Source(s) "RESULTS OF CONTESTED ELECTION AND STATEMENTS OF THE POLL AFTER THE OFFICIAL ADDITION OF VOTES" (PDF).

Sabah state election, 2020
| Party | Candidate | Votes | % | ∆% |
|---|---|---|---|---|
| PN | Abdul Ghani Mohamed Yassin | 4,688 | 54.70 | ▲54.70 |
| UPKO | Albert Aguir | 2,450 | 28.58 | ▲28.58 |
| Love Sabah Party | Ampalus @ Robert Sanaron | 1,115 | 13.01 | ▲11.36 |
| Independent | Maikol Ampuas | 128 | 1.49 | ▲1.49 |
| Total valid votes | | 8,381 | 97.78 | |
| Total rejected ballots | | 182 | 2.12 | |
| Unreturned ballots | | 8 | 0.09 | |
| Turnout | | 8,571 | 68.71 | ▼8.34 |
| Registered electors | | 12,475 | | |
| Majority | | 2,238 | 26.12 | ▲4.18 |
| PN gain from BN | | Swing | | ? |
Source(s) "RESULTS OF CONTESTED ELECTION AND STATEMENTS OF THE POLL AFTER THE OFFICIAL ADDITION OF VOTES".

Sabah state election, 2018
| Party | Candidate | Votes | % | ∆% |
|---|---|---|---|---|
| BN | Bobbey Ah Fang Suan | 5,474 | 57.97 | ▲9.33 |
| Sabah Heritage Party | Ahuar Rasam | 3,402 | 36.03 | ▲36.03 |
| PH | Apandi @ Lukan Agindi | 165 | 1.75 | ▲1.75 |
| Love Sabah Party | Angin @ Nasruddin Lambahan | 156 | 1.65 | ▲1.65 |
| Total valid votes | | 9,197 | 97.39 | |
| Total rejected ballots | | 228 | 2.41 | |
| Unreturned ballots | | 18 | 0.19 | |
| Turnout | | 9,443 | 77.05 | ▼2.68 |
| Registered electors | | 12,256 | | |
| Majority | | 2,072 | 21.94 | ▲17.58 |
| BN hold | | Swing | | |
Source(s) "RESULTS OF CONTESTED ELECTION AND STATEMENTS OF THE POLL AFTER THE OFFICIAL ADDITION OF VOTES".

Sabah state election, 2013
| Party | Candidate | Votes | % | ∆% |
|---|---|---|---|---|
| BN | Bobbey Ah Fang Suan | 3,816 | 48.64 | ▼21.16 |
| PKR | Raymond Ahuar | 3,474 | 44.28 | ▲17.15 |
| STAR | George Eram @ Iram | 310 | 3.95 | ▲3.95 |
| MUPP | Sidum Manjin | 41 | 0.52 | ▲0.52 |
| Independent | Fatimah Agitor @ Mohd Daud | 18 | 0.23 | ▲0.23 |
| Total valid votes | | 7,659 | 97.63 | |
| Total rejected ballots | | 185 | 2.36 | |
| Unreturned ballots | | 1 | 0.01 | |
| Turnout | | 7,845 | 79.73 | ▲11.31 |
| Registered electors | | 9,840 | | |
| Majority | | 342 | 4.36 | ▼38.31 |
| BN hold | | Swing | | |
Source(s) "KEPUTUSAN PILIHAN RAYA UMUM DEWAN UNDANGAN NEGERI".

Sabah state election, 2008
| Party | Candidate | Votes | % | ∆% |
|---|---|---|---|---|
| BN | Bobbey Ah Fang Suan | 3,414 | 69.80 | ▼7.85 |
| PKR | Gabriel Uwing Agunsung | 1,327 | 27.13 | ▲27.13 |
| BERSEKUTU | Alexsius Mangka | 96 | 1.96 | ▲1.96 |
| Total valid votes | | 4,837 | 98.90 | |
| Total rejected ballots | | 54 | 1.10 | |
| Unreturned ballots | | 0 | 0.00 | |
| Turnout | | 4,891 | 68.42 | ▲2.00 |
| Registered electors | | 7,148 | | |
| Majority | | 2,087 | 42.67 | ▼15.85 |
| BN hold | | Swing | | |
Source(s) "KEPUTUSAN PILIHAN RAYA UMUM DEWAN UNDANGAN NEGERI SABAH BAGI TAHUN 2008".

Sabah state election, 2004
| Party | Candidate | Votes | % | ∆% |
|---|---|---|---|---|
| BN | Bobbey Ah Fang Suan | 3,478 | 77.65 | |
| Independent | Gabriel Uwing Agunsung | 857 | 19.13 | |
| Total valid votes | | 4,335 | 96.78 | |
| Total rejected ballots | | 144 | 3.22 | |
| Unreturned ballots | | 0 | 0.00 | |
| Turnout | | 4,479 | 66.42 | |
| Registered electors | | 6,743 | | |
| Majority | | 2,621 | 58.52 | |
| BN hold | | Swing | | |
Source(s) "KEPUTUSAN PILIHAN RAYA UMUM DEWAN UNDANGAN NEGERI SABAH BAGI TAHUN 2004".

Sabah state election, 1994
| Party | Candidate | Votes | % | ∆% |
|---|---|---|---|---|
| PBS | Adut Sigoh | 2,370 | 57.57 | ▼15.35 |
| BN | Ahuar Rasam | 1,747 | 42.43 | ▲19.70 |
| Total valid votes | | 4,117 | 100.00 | |
| Total rejected ballots | | 623 | | |
| Unreturned ballots | | 0 | | |
| Turnout | | 4,740 | 80.73 | ▲3.56 |
| Registered electors | | 5,873 | | |
| Majority | | 623 | 15.12 | ▼53.06 |
| PBS hold | | Swing | | |

Sabah state election, 1990
| Party | Candidate | Votes | % | ∆% |
|---|---|---|---|---|
| PBS | Adut Sigoh | 2,673 | 73.92 | ▲0.48 |
| United Sabah National Organization | Zaiton Anik | 822 | 22.73 | ▲22.73 |
| Independent | James Robert | 121 | 3.35 | ▲3.35 |
| Total valid votes | | 3,616 | 100.00 | |
| Total rejected ballots | | 1,851 | | |
| Unreturned ballots | | 0 | | |
| Turnout | | 5,467 | 77.17 | ▲9.74 |
| Registered electors | | 7,090 | | |
| Majority | | 1,851 | 51.20 | ▼21.96 |
| PBS hold | | Swing | | |

Sabah state election, 1986
| Party | Candidate | Votes | % | ∆% |
|---|---|---|---|---|
| PBS | Adut Sigoh | 2,112 | 73.44 | ▲10.99 |
| Independent | Mohd Yassin Anik | 509 | 17.70 | ▲17.70 |
| Independent | Matusin Eloh | 255 | 8.87 | ▲8.87 |
| Total valid votes | | 2,876 | 100.00 | |
| Total rejected ballots | | 1,603 | | |
| Unreturned ballots | | 0 | | |
| Turnout | | 4,479 | 67.43 | ▲0.84 |
| Registered electors | | 6,643 | | |
| Majority | | 1,603 | 55.73 | ▼6.72 |
| PBS hold | | Swing | | |

Sabah state election, 1985
| Party | Candidate | Votes | % |
|---|---|---|---|
| PBS | Adut Sigoh | 1,690 | 62.45 |
| BERJAYA | Eric Koroh | 502 | 18.55 |
| Independent | Asing Ampagang | 421 | 15.56 |
| Independent | Francis Colman | 93 | 3.44 |
| Total valid votes | | 2,706 | 100.00 |
| Total rejected ballots | | 1,188 | |
| Unreturned ballots | | 0 | |
| Turnout | | 3,894 | 66.59 |
| Registered electors | | 5,842 | |
| Majority | | 1,188 | 43.89 |
This was a new seat created.
