= Apas (state constituency) =

State constituency in Sabah, Malaysia

Apas (N68)
Sabah constituency

State constituency
- Legislature: Sabah State Legislative Assembly
MLA
Nizam Abu Bakar Titingan
GRS
- Constituency created: 2004
- First contested: 2004
- Last contested: 2025

Demographics
- Population (2020): 98,982
- Electors (2025): 32,241

Apas is a state constituency in Sabah, Malaysia, that is represented in the Sabah State Legislative Assembly.

== Demographics ==
As of 2020, Apas has a population of 98,982 people.

Ethnic breakdown of Apas' electorate as of 2025
1. Muslim Bumiputera (80.0%)
2. Chinese (12.0%)
3. Non-Muslim Bumiputera (8.00%)
4. Other ethnicities (0.00%)

== History ==
=== Polling districts ===
According to the gazette issued on 31 October 2022, the Apas constituency has a total of 7 polling districts.

State constituency	Polling District	Code	Location
Apas (N68)	Tawau Lama	190/68/01	SK Kampung Titingan
Apas (N68)	Tinagat	190/68/02	SK Batu Payung; SJK (C) Chung Hwa
Apas (N68)	Apas	190/68/03	SK Kuala Apas
Apas (N68)	Wakuba	190/68/04	SK Wakuba
Apas (N68)	Titingan	190/68/05	SK Titingan
Apas (N68)	Inderasabah	190/68/06	SK Inderasabah
Apas (N68)	Batu 4	190/68/07	SK Batu 4 Jalan Apas

=== Representation history ===
Member of Sabah State Legislative Assembly for Apas
Assembly	No	Years	Member	Party
Constituency created from Balung
12th	N56	2004–2008	Tawfiq Titingan	BN (UMNO)
13th	N56	2008–2013	Tawfiq Titingan	BN (UMNO)
14th	N56	2013–2018	Tawfiq Titingan	BN (UMNO)
14th	N56	2018	Vacant (Note: Vacant from 14 March 2018 until the 2018 Malaysian general election due to the incumbent died in office.)	
15th	N56	2018	Nizam Abu Bakar Titingan	BN (UMNO)
15th	N56	2018–2019	Nizam Abu Bakar Titingan	Independent
15th	N56	2019–2020	Nizam Abu Bakar Titingan	PH (BERSATU)
15th	N56	2020	Nizam Abu Bakar Titingan	PN (BERSATU)
16th	N68	2020–2022	Nizam Abu Bakar Titingan	GRS (BERSATU)
16th	N68	2022–2023	Nizam Abu Bakar Titingan	GRS (Direct)
16th	N68	2023–2025	Nizam Abu Bakar Titingan	GRS (GAGASAN)
17th	N68	2025–present	Nizam Abu Bakar Titingan	GRS (GAGASAN)

== Election results ==
Sabah state election, 2025
Party	Candidate	Votes	%	∆%
GRS	Nizam Abu Bakar Titingan	9,239	49.66	▲49.66
Heritage	Sarman Amat Simito	4,991	26.83	▼11.63
BN	Elmiariezan Ardan	2,151	11.56	▲11.56
PN	Lim Ting Khai	1,949	10.43	▼46.78
Sabah Dream Party	Herman Amdas	177	0.95	▲0.95
Sabah People's Unity Party	Marsiah Omat	105	0.56	▲0.56
Total valid votes		18,603		
Total rejected ballots		351		
Unreturned ballots		17		
Turnout		18,971	58.84	▲2.45
Registered electors		32,241		
Majority		4,248	22.83	▲4.08
GRS gain from PN		Swing		?
Source(s) "RESULTS OF CONTESTED ELECTION AND STATEMENTS OF THE POLL AFTER THE OFFICIAL ADDITION OF VOTES" (PDF).

Sabah state election, 2020
Party	Candidate	Votes	%	∆%
PN	Nizam Abu Bakar Titingan	6,252	57.21	▲57.21
Sabah Heritage Party	Amrullah Kamal	4,203	38.46	▼0.96
Love Sabah Party	Indal	186	1.70	▲1.70
USNO (Baru)	Mohd Sayadi Bakal	83	0.76	▲0.76
Total valid votes		10,724	98.13	
Total rejected ballots		173	1.58	
Unreturned ballots		31	0.28	
Turnout		10,928	56.39	▼16.54
Registered electors		19,378		
Majority		2,049	18.75	▲5.84
PN gain from BN		Swing		?
Source(s) "RESULTS OF CONTESTED ELECTION AND STATEMENTS OF THE POLL AFTER THE OFFICIAL ADDITION OF VOTES".

Sabah state election, 2018
Party	Candidate	Votes	%	∆%
BN	Nizam Abu Bakar Titingan	7,243	52.33	▼20.90
Sabah Heritage Party	Abdul Salip Ejal	5,456	39.42	▲39.42
PAS	Daud Jalaluddin	487	3.52	▲3.52
Sabah People's Hope Party	Alizaman Jijurahman	333	2.41	▲2.41
Total valid votes		13,519	97.67	
Total rejected ballots		290	2.10	
Unreturned ballots		32	0.23	
Turnout		13,841	72.93	▼5.87
Registered electors		18,978		
Majority		1,787	12.91	▼36.15
BN hold		Swing		{{{2}}}
Source(s) "RESULTS OF CONTESTED ELECTION AND STATEMENTS OF THE POLL AFTER THE OFFICIAL ADDITION OF VOTES".

Sabah state election, 2013
Party	Candidate	Votes	%	∆%
BN	Tawfiq Titingan	9,013	72.23	▼0.02
PKR	Alizaman Jijurahman	2,891	23.17	▼0.89
SAPP	Tahir Dahu	149	1.19	▲1.19
STAR	Chok Yit Min	75	0.60	▲0.60
Total valid votes		12,128	97.19	
Total rejected ballots		327	2.62	
Unreturned ballots		24	0.19	
Turnout		12,479	78.80	▲16.45
Registered electors		15,837		
Majority		6,122	49.06	▲0.87
BN hold		Swing		{{{2}}}
Source(s) "KEPUTUSAN PILIHAN RAYA UMUM DEWAN UNDANGAN NEGERI".

Sabah state election, 2008
Party	Candidate	Votes	%	∆%
BN	Tawfiq Titingan	5,409	72.25	
PKR	Henry Vun Kon Pau	1,801	24.06	
Independent	Ardi Arsah @ Samsi	77	1.03	
Total valid votes		7,287	97.34	
Total rejected ballots		193	2.58	
Unreturned ballots		6	0.08	
Turnout		7,486	62.35	
Registered electors		12,006		
Majority		8,639	48.19	
BN hold		Swing		{{{2}}}
Source(s) "KEPUTUSAN PILIHAN RAYA UMUM DEWAN UNDANGAN NEGERI SABAH BAGI TAHUN 2008".

Sabah state election, 2004
Party	Candidate	Votes	%	∆%
On the nomination day, Tawfiq Titingan won uncontested.
BN	Tawfiq Titingan			
Total valid votes				
Total rejected ballots				
Unreturned ballots				
Turnout				
Registered electors		11,686		
Majority				
This was a new constituency created.
Source(s) "KEPUTUSAN PILIHAN RAYA UMUM DEWAN UNDANGAN NEGERI SABAH BAGI TAHUN 2004".
