= People's Justice Front =

United People's Justice Front
- Malay name: Angkatan Keadilan Rakyat Bersatu اڠكتن كعاديلن رعيت برساتو
- Chinese name: 人民統一公正陣綫 人民统一公正阵线 rénmín tǒngyī gōngzhèng zhènxiàn
- Founded: 15 September 1989
- Dissolved: 20 May 2001
- Split from: United Sabah Party
- Succeeded by: PGRS (under Dr. Ationg Tituh in 2013)
- Headquarters: Kota Kinabalu, Sabah
- National affiliation: Barisan Nasional (1991-2001)

Party flag

People's Justice Front or in Malay: Angkatan Keadilan Rakyat (AKAR) was a splinter party of Parti Bersatu Sabah (PBS) formed in 1989 which was led by Dusun and Bajau ethnic-based leaders namely Mark Koding, Kalakau Untol and Pandikar Amin Mulia. In 1995, AKAR had gone through a leadership crisis between Pandikar Amin Mulia and Jeffrey Kitingan. The party's name was later changed to United People's Justice Front or in Malay: Angkatan Keadilan Rakyat Bersatu (AKAR BERSATU). AKAR BERSATU was dissolved to enable its members to join UMNO in 2001, meanwhile half of the members, the AKAR faction that disagreed UMNO co-operation, they joined the PGRS, a local Sabahan party founded by Ationg Tituh in 2013. Ationg Tituh is one of notable AKAR former members and he is the leader of Kuamut branch AKAR Party.

== Government offices ==
=== State government ===
- Sabah (1994–1999)

Note: bold as Premier/Chief Minister, italic as junior partner

== General election results ==
| Election | Total seats won | Seats contested | Total votes | Share of votes | Outcome of election | Election leader |
|---|---|---|---|---|---|---|
| 1990 | 0 / 180 | 4 | 12,655 | 0.23% | ; No representation in Parliament | Pandikar Amin Mulia |
| 1995 | 0 / 192 | 2 | 16,193 | 0.27% | ; No representation in Parliament (Barisan Nasional) | Pandikar Amin Mulia |

== State election results ==
Sabah State Legislative Assembly
| Election | Votes | | Seats | | | Position | Status |
| Election | Count | % | Result | Won / contested | +/– | Position | Status |
|---|---|---|---|---|---|---|---|
| 1990 | 10,757 | 2.9 | 0 / 48 | 0 / 32 | Steady | 5th | No seats |
| 1994 | 15,084 | 3.5 | 1 / 48 | 1 / 7 | ▲1 | ▲2nd (Barisan Nasional) | Opposition (1994) |
| 1994 | 15,084 | 3.5 | 1 / 48 | 1 / 7 | ▲1 | ▲2nd (Barisan Nasional) | BN (1994–1999) |
| 1999 | 8,033 | 1.6 | 0 / 48 | 0 / 2 | Steady | ▲1st (Barisan Nasional) | No seats |
