= Cabinet of Sabah =

Malaysian state government

- Kabinet Negeri Sabah
- Coat of arms of Sabah

Overview
- State: Sabah
- Leader: Chief Minister
- Appointed by: Governor on the advice of the Chief Minister
- Responsible to: Legislative Assembly

The Cabinet of Sabah is a part of the executive arm of the Government of Sabah, Malaysia. The Cabinet consists of the Chief Minister, appointed by the Governor on the basis that he is able to command a majority in the Sabah State Legislative Assembly, and 10 other ministers made up of members of the Sabah State Legislative Assembly.

This Cabinet is similar in structure and role to that of federal level, while being smaller in size. As federal and state responsibilities differ, there are a number of portfolios that differ between the federal and state governments.

Members of the Cabinet are selected by the Chief Minister, and appointed by the Governor. Cabinet Ministers are always the head of a ministry.

== List of cabinets ==
Assembly	Term began	Members	Election	Cabinet	Majority party/coalition
1st	1963		Appointed	Fuad I	Sabah Alliance
2nd	1965		Appointed	Peter Lo	Sabah Alliance
3rd	1967	32		Mustapha I	Sabah Aliance
4th	1971	32		Mustapha II (1971–1975) Said I (1975–1976)	Sabah Aliance (1971–1973) Barisan Nasional (1973–1976)
5th	1976	48		Fuad II (1976) Haris I (1976–1981)	BERJAYA
6th	1981	48		Haris II	Barisan Nasional
7th	1985	48		Joseph I	PBS
8th	1986	48		Joseph II	Barisan Nasional
9th	1990	48		Joseph III	Gagasan Rakyat
10th	1994	48		Joseph IV (1994) Sakaran (1994) Salleh (1994–1996) Yong Teck Lee (1996–1998) Bernard (1998–1999)	Gagasan Rakyat (1994) Barisan Nasional (1994–1999)
11th	1999	48		Sukam I (1999–2001) Chong Kah Kiat I (2001–2003) Musa I (2003-2004)	Barisan Nasional
12th	2004	60		Musa II	Barisan Nasional
13th	2008	60		Musa III	Barisan Nasional
14th	2013	60		Musa IV	Barisan Nasional
15th	2018	60		Musa V (2018) Shafie (2018–2020)	Barisan Nasional (2018) WARISAN (2018–2020)
16th	2020	73		Hajiji I	Gabungan Rakyat Sabah
17th	2025	73		Hajiji II	Gabungan Rakyat Sabah

== Current Cabinet ==
The current cabinet, led by Chief Minister Hajiji Noor. Hajiji formed his cabinet following the 2025 Sabah state election.

== See also ==
- List of Yang di-Pertua Negeri of Sabah
- Chief Minister of Sabah
- Sabah State Legislative Assembly
- Sabah State Government
