= 2025 Sabah state election =

State election in Sabah, Malaysia

- 29 November 2025

73 of 79 seats in the Legislative Assembly 37 seats needed for a majority
- Registered: 1,784,843
- Turnout: 1,148,476 (64.35%)
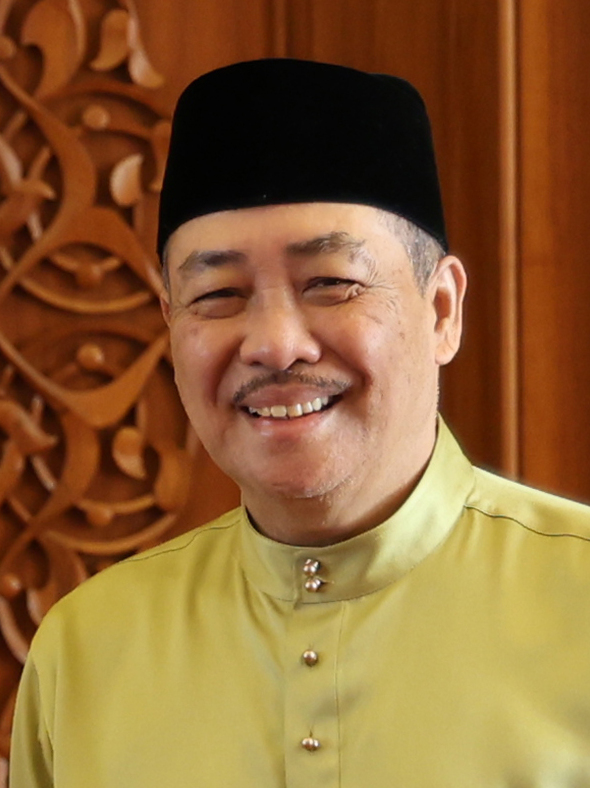

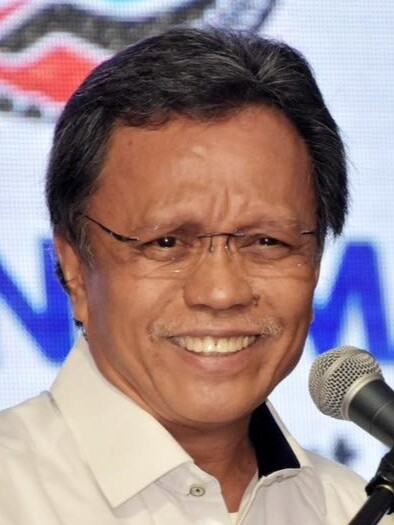

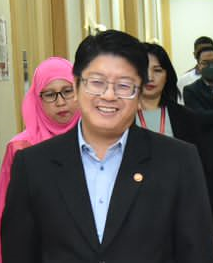

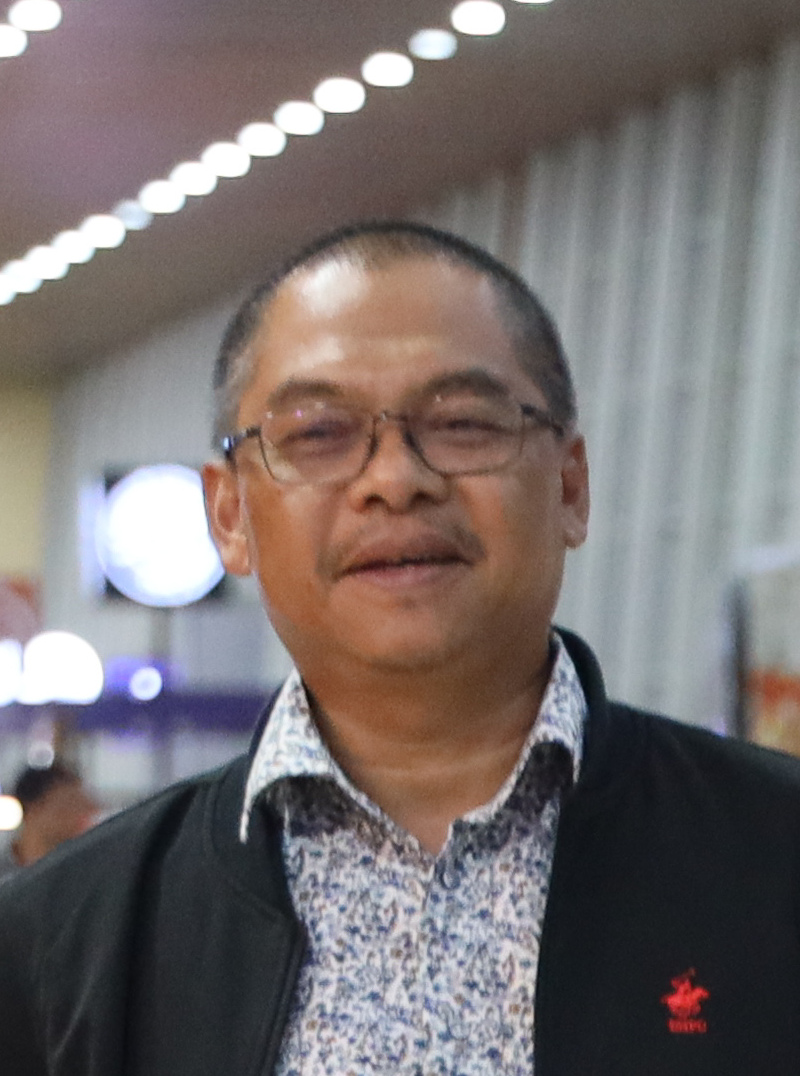

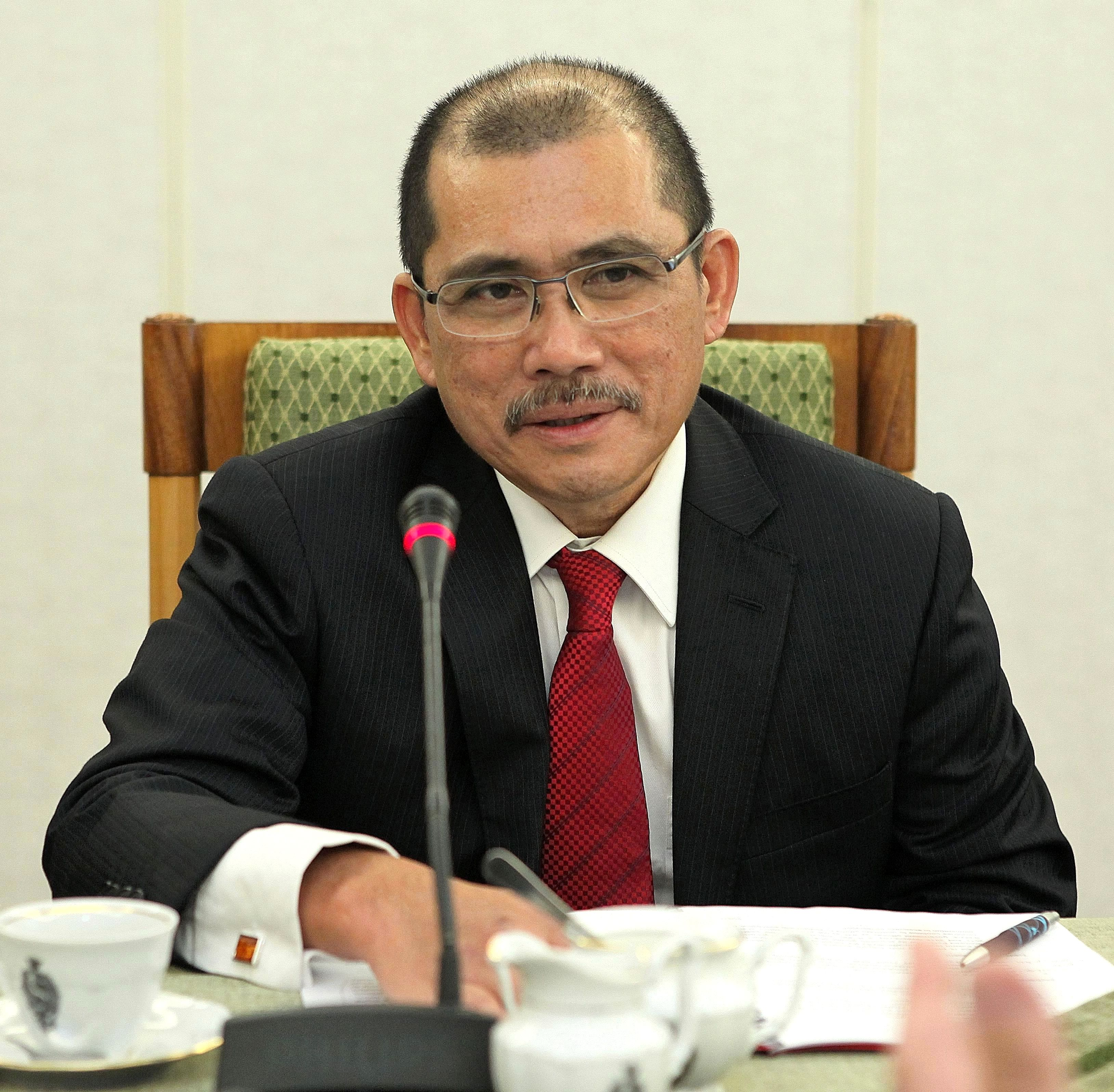
	Majority party	Minority party	Third party
			BN
Leader	Hajiji Noor	Shafie Apdal	Bung Moktar Radin
Party	GAGASAN	WARISAN	UMNO Sabah
Alliance	Gabungan Rakyat Sabah		Barisan Nasional
Leader since	11 March 2022	17 October 2016	12 December 2018
Leader's seat	Sulaman	Senallang (MP for Semporna)	Lamag (MP for Kinabatangan)
Last election	24 seats (Note: Excludes UMNO Sabah)	23 seats	14 seats
Seats before	38 (+2 nominated)	14 (+0 nominated)	11 (Note: The seat count includes Sungai Sibuga, whose incumbent Mohamad Hamsan died on 19 January 2025) (+2 nominated)
Seats won	29	25	6
Seat change	▼9	▲11	▼5
Popular vote	286,389	288,703	144,584
Percentage	25.37%	25.57%	12.81%
	Fourth party	Fifth party	Sixth party
		STAR; SAPP
Leader	Ewon Benedick	Jeffrey Kitingan; Yong Teck Lee	Mustapha Sakmud (Note: Serving as de facto leader following UPKO's exit from PH.)
Party	UPKO	STAR; SAPP	PKR
Alliance			Pakatan Harapan
Leader since	15 January 2023	6 January 2012; 21 January 1994	10 November 2025
Leader's seat	Kadamaian (MP for Penampang)	Tambunan (MP for Keningau); Did not contest (Nominated MLA)	Did not contest (MP for Sepanggar)
Last election	1 seat	6 seats	8 seats
Seats before	1 (+0 nominated)	6 (+0 nominated); 0 (+1 nominated)	7 (+0 nominated)
Seats won	3	2	1
Seat change	▲2	▼4	▼6
Popular vote	64,471	81,143	75,938
Percentage	5.71%	7.18%	6.73%
	Seventh party	Eighth party
	KDM
Leader	Priscella Peter	Ronald Kiandee
Party	KDM	BERSATU Sabah
Alliance		Perikatan Nasional
Leader since	7 March 2025	10 December 2022
Leader's seat	Defeated in Melalap	Defeated in Sugut (MP for Beluran)
Last election	New	11
Seats before	1 (Note: The seat count includes Melalap, whose incumbent Peter Anthony began his prison sentence on 4 March 2025.) (+0 nominated)	0 (+1 nominated)
Seats won	1	1
Seat change	Steady	▲1
Popular vote	54,050	41,584
Percentage	4.79%	3.68%
- Results by party
Chief Minister before election
Hajiji Noor
GRS-GAGASAN
Elected Chief Minister
Hajiji Noor
GRS-GAGASAN

The 2025 Sabah state election, formally the 17th Sabah general election, (Note: The Election Commission of Malaysia officially used the term PRU Sabah 2025 to denote the state-level electoral process in Sabah. In English, this is translated as the 2025 Sabah General Election.) was held on 29 November 2025. All 73 seats were contested to elect members of 17th Sabah State Legislative Assembly. No constituencies were added or removed in a redistribution from the previous election.

Incumbent Chief Minister Hajiji Noor led his Gabungan Rakyat Sabah majority coalition government to seek a second five-year term. GRS was primarily challenged by WARISAN, led by state opposition leader Shafie Apdal. Other parties such as Barisan Nasional, Pakatan Harapan, KDM, Perikatan Nasional, STAR, SAPP, UPKO, Parti Impian Sabah, and other minor parties and independents also contested in this election.

The state election resulted in a hung assembly for the second time since the 2018 Sabah state election. GRS won the most seats in the Sabah State Legislative Assembly with 29 seats.

== Background ==
Traditionally, state elections are held simultaneously with the parliamentary election but each state can decide when to hold its election. This is because state assemblies are dissolved by their respective ruler or governor on the advice of the chief minister of the state.

The pre-election state government led by Hajiji was formed following the 2023 Sabah political crisis, where UMNO Sabah had attempted to engineer the formation of a new government by retracting its support for Hajiji in the state legislative assembly. The attempt failed and resulted in the exclusion of UMNO and Malaysian United Indigenous Party (BESATU) from GRS and the state government. Pakatan Harapan, with whom Hajiji's GRS was allied at the federal level, was instead brought into the state government.

In the lead-up to the election, GRS and Pakatan Harapan agreed to an electoral pact to avoid contesting against each other. Unhappy with the decision, GRS component parties STAR and SAPP left the coalition and contested the election together. Separately, UPKO exited Pakatan Harapan, citing differences in understanding, particularly over issues of state rights and autonomy, as well as frustrations surrounding the political leadership of Pakatan Harapan's Sabah chapter.

The state election was held against a backdrop of increased nationalist or regionalist sentiment, encapsulated by the "Sabah for Sabahans" slogan, related to the state's fight for autonomy, including over the issue of revenue sharing. Other prominent issues included a mining license corruption scandal, which implicated members of the ruling GRS alliance as well as the federal government through a series of secret recordings made by businessman Albert Tei released over the course of a year.

== Electoral system ==
Elections in Malaysia are conducted at the federal and state levels. Federal elections elect members of the Dewan Rakyat, the lower house of Parliament, while state elections in each of the 13 states elect members of their respective state legislative assembly. As Malaysia follows the Westminster system of government, the head of government (Prime Minister at the federal level and the Menteri Besar/Chief Ministers/Premier at the state level) is the person who commands the confidence of the majority of members in the respective legislature – this is normally the leader of the party or coalition with the majority of seats in the legislature.

The Legislative Assembly consists of 73 members, known as Members of the Legislative Assembly (MLAs), that are elected for five-year terms. Each MLA is elected from a single-member constituencies using the first-past-the-post voting system; each constituency contains approximately an equal number of voters. If one party obtains a majority of seats, then that party is entitled to form the government, with its leader becoming the Chief Minister. In the event of a hung parliament, where no single party obtains the majority of seats, the government may still form through a coalition or a confidence and supply agreement with other parties. In practice, coalitions and alliances in Malaysia, and by extension, in Sabah, generally persist between elections, and member parties do not normally contest for the same seats.

The voting age is currently 18. Elections are conducted by the Election Commission of Malaysia, which is under the jurisdiction of the Prime Minister's Department. Malaysia practices automatic voter registration but does not practice compulsory voting.

== Preparations ==
On 27 March 2024, State Chairman of Barisan Nasional (BN) and United Malays National Organisation (UMNO) of Sabah Bung Moktar Radin dismissed the possibility of Sabah BN to work with Gabungan Rakyat Sabah (GRS) coalition led by Chief Minister Hajiji Noor.

Hajiji meanwhile, said that GRS is open to collaboration from other parties, but insists that the preference is working together with Pakatan Harapan (PH), who joined the Sabah government after BN withdrawal during the 2023 Sabah political crisis. Parti Warisan Sabah (WARISAN) also were interested in cooperating with GRS for the elections, but according to its president Shafie Apdal, its invitation to discuss such collaborations were turned down by GRS several times.

Meanwhile, Perikatan Nasional (PN) have announced its intention to contest all 73 state seats in its first foray into the state, the move which led to Sabah Progressive Party's (SAPP) exit from PN, as announced by party leader Yong Teck Lee in December 2024, as SAPP insists that only party which has origins in Sabah are allowed to contest the election. SAPP will contest the election under GRS, the local coalition which it is a component in parallel with PN since 2020. This is the first time PN contesting the election under its own banner, although its component party Sabah BERSATU have contested and won seats before, under PH (PKR) and GRS in the 2018 and 2020 state elections respectively. PAS and GERAKAN also have contested in Sabah before, with GERAKAN having won seats under BN banner.

On 15 December 2024, Social Democratic Harmony Party (KDM), through its President Peter Anthony also confirmed that the party would contest the election as a party, without being in a coalition and working together with other parties, targeting 43 state seats. Anthony, who is also the Melalap MLA however, announced that he would not contest the election and defend the Melalap state seat in the election, in view of the pending appeal to his court case. After Peter loses his final appeal on 4 March 2025 and sentenced to jail immediately, the party moved on 7 March 2025 to appoint his daughter Priscella Peter as the acting President.

On 15 January 2025, PN, through its Deputy Chairman Hamzah Zainudin launched the slogan 'Kasi Bagus Sabah' (Make Sabah Great Again in English) as part of its preparations for contesting the election.

On 16 January 2025, the Malaysian Chinese Association (MCA), through its President Wee Ka Siong, confirmed that the party would contest in the election.

On 2 October 2025, the Homeland Solidarity Party (STAR) and Sabah Progressive Party (SAPP) has left the ruling Gabungan Rakyat Sabah (GRS) coalition. However 5 of STAR MLA decided to stay with GRS for the election, and were expelled from STAR.

On 6 October 2025, Chief Minister Hajiji Noor officially announced the dissolution of the 16th Sabah State Legislative Assembly.

United Progressive Kinabalu Organisation (UPKO) announced on 10 November 2025 that it has exited the PH coalition and will contest under its own banner, a day after its leader, Ewon Benedick resigned as federal cabinet minister.

== Campaign slogans ==
Party	Slogan
Gabungan Rakyat Sabah	Kita Jaga Sabah; Hebatkan Sabah; Sabah Maju Jaya; Rumah Kita Kita Jaga
Barisan Nasional	Radu Tatap Radu; Demi Rakyat Demi Sabah; Kita Bikin Balik Sabah
Heritage Party	Selamatkan Sabah
Pakatan Harapan	Harapan Urang Sabah (PKR & AMANAH)
Pakatan Harapan	Bikin Sabah Lagi Mantap (DAP); Roket Di Sabah Maju Bersama (DAP)
Perikatan Nasional	Kasi Bagus Sabah; Perikatan Nasional Baik, Perikatan Nasional Best
United Progressive Kinabalu Organisation	Sabah First
Gerakan Bersatu Sabah (STAR & SAPP)	Sabah For Sabahan; Justice For Sabah
Social Democratic Harmony Party	Misompuru Tokou

== Timeline ==
The key dates are listed below.

Date	Event
6 October 2025	Dissolution of the Sabah State Legislative Assembly.
16 October 2025	Issue of the Writ of Election
14 November 2025	Nomination Day
14 - 28 November 2025	Campaigning Period
25 - 28 November 2025	Early Polling Day For Postal, Overseas and Advance Voters
29 November 2025	Polling Day

== Departing incumbents ==
The following members of the 16th Sabah State Legislative Assembly did not seek re-election.

No.	State Constituency	Departing MLA	Coalition (Party)	Date confirmed	First elected	Reason
N24	Tanjung Keramat	Shahelmey Yahya	BN (UMNO)	12 November 2025	2020	Not seeking re-election (MP for Putatan)
N29	Pantai Manis	Mohd Tamin Zainal	BN (UMNO)	9 November 2025	2020	Dropped by party
N51	Sungai Manila	Mokran Ingkat	BN (UMNO)	9 November 2025	2020	Dropped by party
N52	Sungai Sibuga	Mohamad Hamsan Awang Supain	BN (UMNO)	19 January 2025	2020	Died in office
N71	Tanjung Batu	Andi Muhammad Suryady Bandy	BN (UMNO)	12 November 2025	2020	Not seeking re-election (MP for Kalabakan)
N14	Tamparuli	Jahid Jahim	GRS (PBS)	13 November 2025	2004	Dropped by party
N35	Sindumin	Yusof Yacob	GRS (GAGASAN)	12 November 2025	2018	Dropped by party
N67	Balung	Hamid Awang	GRS (GAGASAN)	12 November 2025	2020	Dropped by party
N42	Melalap	Peter Anthony	KDM	4 March 2025	2018	Imprisonment
N19	Likas	Tan Lee Fatt	PH (DAP)	8 November 2025	2018	Dropped by party
N20	Api-Api	Christina Liew Chin Jin	PH (PKR)	9 November 2025	2013	Dropped by party
N40	Bingkor	Robert Tawik	STAR	13 November 2025	2018	Not seeking re-election
N44	Tulid	Flovia Ng	STAR	12 November 2025	2020	Dropped by party
N26	Moyog	Darell Leiking	WARISAN	12 November 2025	2020	Not seeking re-election
N62	Silam	Dumi Pg Masdal	WARISAN	12 November 2025	2018	Dropped by party

=== Incumbents contested in different party ===
No.	State Constituency	MLA	Coalition (Party)		First elected
No.	State Constituency	MLA	Formerly	Current	First elected
N08	Pintasan	Fairuz Renddan	GRS (GAGASAN)	Independent	2020
N23	Petagas	Awang Ahmad Sah Awang Sahari	GRS (GAGASAN)	Independent	2020
N38	Paginatan	Abidin Madingkir	STAR	GRS (Direct)	2018
N41	Liawan	Annuar Ayub Aman	STAR	GRS (Direct)	2020
N45	Sook	Ellron Alfred Angin	STAR	GRS (Direct)	2018
N54	Karamunting	George Hiew Vun Zin	GRS (GAGASAN)	PH (PKR)	2018
N70	Kukusan	Rina Jainal	GRS (PHRS)	Independent	2020

=== Incumbents contested in different constituency ===
MLA	Coalition (Party)	State Constituency		First elected
MLA	Coalition (Party)	Formerly	Current	First elected
Wetrom Bahanda	KDM	N06 Bandau	N05 Matunggong	2020
Ginger Phoong Jin Zhe	PH (DAP)	N21 Luyang	N19 Likas	2018

=== Incumbents lost re-election in the 2025 election ===
No.	State Constituency	Departing MLA	Coalition (Party)	First elected
N06	Bandau	Wetrom Bahanda	KDM	2020
N10	Usukan	Salleh Said Keruak	BN (UMNO)	1994
N16	Karambunai	Yakubah Khan	BN (UMNO)	2020
N18	Inanam	Peto Galim	PH (PKR)	2020
N21	Luyang	Ginger Phoong Jin Zhe	PH (DAP)	2018
N25	Kapayan	Jannie Lasimbang	PH (DAP)	2018
N38	Paginatan	Abidin Madingkir	GRS (Direct)	2018 (Note: Formerly GRS (STAR))
N41	Liawan	Annuar Ayub Aman	GRS (Direct)	2020 (Note: Formerly GRS (STAR))
N45	Sook	Ellron Alfred Angin	GRS (Direct)	2018 (Note: Formerly GRS (STAR))
N54	Karamunting	George Hiew Vun Zin	PH (PKR)	2018 (Note: Formerly GRS (GAGASAN))
N63	Kunak	Norazlinah Arif	GRS (GAGASAN)	2018
N73	Sebatik	Hassan A. Gani Pg. Amir	GRS (GAGASAN)	2020

== Candidates ==
No.	Parliamentary constituency	No.	State Constituency	Number of Voters	Constituency Largest Ethnic	Incumbent Member	Incumbent Coalition (Party)	Political coalitions and respective candidates and coalitions																																									
No.	Parliamentary constituency	No.	State Constituency	Number of Voters	Constituency Largest Ethnic	Incumbent Member	Incumbent Coalition (Party)	Gabungan Rakyat Sabah (GRS)		Heritage Party (WARISAN)		Barisan Nasional (BN)		Pakatan Harapan (PH)		Perikatan Nasional (PN)		Social Democratic Harmony Party (KDM)		Gerakan Bersatu Sabah (GBS)		United Progressive Kinabalu Organisation (UPKO)		Parti Impian Sabah (IMPIAN)		Sabah Native Cooperation Party (ANAK NEGERI)		Parti Kebangsaan Sabah (PKS)		Parti Bumi Kenyalang (PBK)		Parti Rumpun Sabah (RUMPUN)		Parti Perpaduan Rakyat Sabah (PPRS)		Parti Damai Sabah (SPP)		Others											
No.	Parliamentary constituency	No.	State Constituency	Number of Voters	Constituency Largest Ethnic	Incumbent Member	Incumbent Coalition (Party)	Candidate name	Party	Candidate name	Party	Candidate name	Party	Candidate name	Party	Candidate name	Party	Candidate name	Party	Candidate name	Party	Candidate name	Party	Candidate name	Party	Candidate name	Party	Candidate name	Party	Candidate name	Party	Candidate name	Party	Candidate name	Party	Candidate name	Party	Candidate name	Party	Candidate name	Party	Candidate name	Party	Candidate name	Party	Candidate name	Party	Candidate name	Party
P167	Kudat	N01	Banggi	9,484	Others	Mohammad Mohamarin	GRS (GAGASAN)	Mohammad Mohamarin	GAGASAN	Zainal Romio	WARISAN	Normalah Rasik	UMNO	Not contested		Rahimah Majid	BERSATU	Not contested		Salbin Muksin	STAR	Not contested		Among Timbul	IMPIAN	Abdul Razak Abdul Salam	ANAK NEGERI	Azlan Raymon Majumah	PKS	Halman Maniuk	PBK	Not contested		Not contested		Not contested		Azry Hussin	Independent (BLACK)	Nasib Samodi	Independent	Hussin Masuddin	Independent						
P167	Kudat	N02	Bengkoka	18,056	Rungus	Harun Durabi	BN (UMNO)	Samuil Mopun	PBS	Fauziah Stephens	WARISAN	Harun Durabi	UMNO	Not contested		Berusli Kimin	BERSATU	Richard Mazagi	KDM	Maklin Masiau	STAR	Junsim Rumunzing	UPKO	Matin Ugung	IMPIAN	Not contested		Not contested		Gunsanad Malingka	PBK	Not contested		Not contested		Not contested		Jomin Mogompit	Independent (BLACK)	Kpd Oding	Independent								
P167	Kudat	N03	Pitas	17,574	Kadazan Dusun	Ruddy Awah	GRS (GAGASAN)	Ruddy Awah	GAGASAN	Harun Ismail	WARISAN	Bolkiah Ismail	UMNO	Not contested		Not contested		Abdul Hamid Kimin	KDM	Not contested		Not contested		Kinchin Boluot	IMPIAN	Not contested		Not contested		Not contested		Not contested		Not contested		Not contested		Nazri Santong	Independent										
P167	Kudat	N04	Tanjong Kapor	34,001	Rungus	Ben Chong Chen Bin	GRS (GAGASAN)	Ben Chong Chen Bin	GAGASAN	Terence Au Soon Fui	WARISAN	Kevin Lee Sip Kim	MCA	Not contested		Muhammad Affan Jumahat	BERSATU	Not contested		Shawn Davey Robert Lee	STAR	Not contested		Jetol Dangin	IMPIAN	Awang Karim Abdul Kadir	ANAK NEGERI	Not contested		Abdul Halim Yussof	PBK	Not contested		Not contested		Bonny Berman	SPP	Verdon Bahanda	Independent (BLACK)	Abdul Rahim Madtaip	Independent								
P168	Kota Marudu	N05	Matunggong	29,176	Rungus	Julita Majungki	GRS (PBS)	Julita Majungki	PBS	Jornah Mozihim	WARISAN	Not contested		Not contested		Not contested		Wetrom Bahanda	KDM	Not contested		Not contested		J Ojilim Asam	IMPIAN	Not contested		Freddy Chong Yee Vui	PKS	Not contested		Not contested		Not contested		Not contested		Ainin Ekon	Independent										
P168	Kota Marudu	N06	Bandau	27,390	Kadazan Dusun	Wetrom Bahanda	KDM	Redonah Bahanda	GAGASAN	Rizam Abd Rahman	WARISAN	Willey Lampaki	UMNO	Zaidi Jatil	PKR	Not contested		Jaiping Minsu Lumindang	KDM	Shirewin D Patrick	STAR	Suzie Salapan	UPKO	Sauting Rabuyot	IMPIAN	Not contested		Siti Haima Jailani	PKS	Jupperi Lenson	PBK	Not contested		Not contested		Not contested		Norman Tulang	ASPIRASI	Maijol Mahap	Independent	Jolius Majawai	Independent						
P168	Kota Marudu	N07	Tandek	29,244	Kadazan Dusun	Hendrus Anding	GRS (PBS)	Hendrus Anding	PBS	Jilid Zainuddin Kuminding	WARISAN	Not contested		Not contested		Not contested		Benson Tuyundo	KDM	Arlinsia Agang	STAR	Jamil M Zakariah @ Majingkin	UPKO	Abel Pangair	IMPIAN	Not contested		Not contested		James Gantukok	PBK	Not contested		Not contested		Not contested													
P169	Kota Belud	N08	Pintasan	15,896	Iranun	Fairuz Renddan	GRS (GAGASAN)	Pandikar Amin Mulia	USNO	Abdullah Otong	WARISAN	Tadzul Radim	UMNO	Not contested		Awang Salleh Makmud	BERSATU	Almudin Kaida	KDM	Raplin Samat	STAR	Not contested		Lomog Rudin @ Efejus Rudin	IMPIAN	Not contested		Not contested		Not contested		Not contested		Not contested		Not contested		Mohd Rizal Saiman	Independent (BLACK)	Syarif Mohd Shukree Danchingan	Independent	Fairuz Renddan	Independent						
P169	Kota Belud	N09	Tempasuk	17,116	Bajau	Mohd Arsad Bistari	GRS (GAGASAN)	Mohd Arsad Bistari	GAGASAN	Mohd Khidir Lamsil	WARISAN	Azwan Norjan	UMNO	Not contested		Not contested		John Samud	KDM	Walter Mark Mukis	STAR	Not contested		Timuti Majitol	IMPIAN	Not contested		Rimin Maun	PKS	Not contested		Not contested		Not contested		Not contested													
P169	Kota Belud	N10	Usukan	24,235	Bajau	Salleh Said Keruak	BN (UMNO)	Japlin Akim	GAGASAN	Isnaraissah Munirah Majilis	WARISAN	Salleh Said Keruak	UMNO	Not contested		Not contested		Not contested		Mohd Lin Harun	STAR	Not contested		Jefris Muadis	IMPIAN	Not contested		Not contested		Not contested		Not contested		Not contested		Not contested		Ajun Meliyon	Independent										
P169	Kota Belud	N11	Kadamaian	26,240	Kadazan Dusun	Ewon Benedick	PH (UPKO)	Mudezam Muyau @ James Muyou	PBS	Norman Simon	WARISAN	Not contested		Not contested		Not contested		Josely Taising	KDM	Davylandon Rub	STAR	Ewon Benedick	UPKO	Daibi Mandadi	IMPIAN	Priskila Akwila Senim	ANAK NEGERI	Not contested		Not contested		Not contested		Not contested		Not contested		Judin Tingih	PBM										
P170	Tuaran	N12	Sulaman	18,352	Bajau	Hajiji Noor	GRS (GAGASAN)	Hajiji Noor	GAGASAN	Mokhtar Hussin	WARISAN	Shahnon Rizal Thaijuddin	UMNO	Not contested		Tiaminah @ Siti Aminah Ele	BERSATU	Not contested		Not contested		Not contested		Pajudin Nordin	IMPIAN	Not contested		Not contested		Not contested		Not contested		Not contested		Not contested													
P170	Tuaran	N13	Pantai Dalit	26,346	Bajau	Jasnih Daya	GRS (GAGASAN)	Jasnih Daya	GAGASAN	Aliasgar Basri	WARISAN	Alfian Sambas	UMNO	Not contested		Mohd Zulkernain Osman	BERSATU	Jaesman Jaess Gipin	KDM	Francis Fahir	STAR	Not contested		Liam Tawil	IMPIAN	Not contested		Not contested		Not contested		Not contested		Not contested		Not contested													
P170	Tuaran	N14	Tamparuli	26,767	Kadazan Dusun	Jahid Jahim	GRS (PBS)	Bonaventure Boniface	PBS	Joseph Lee Han Kyun	WARISAN	Not contested		Not contested		Not contested		Gaim James Lunkapis	KDM	Jinitoh Sontori	STAR	Wilfred Madius Tangau	UPKO	Julia Ongkili	IMPIAN	Arthur Erik Lee	ANAK NEGERI	Not contested		Not contested		Aliusus Sipil	RUMPUN	Not contested		Not contested		Raymond Alfred	Independent (BLACK)	Andrew Mali	Independent	Samson S Koroh	Independent	Vun Yun Fook	Independent	Johan Jahid	Independent		
P170	Tuaran	N15	Kiulu	17,191	Kadazan Dusun	Joniston Bangkuai	GRS (PBS)	Joniston Bangkuai	PBS	Saibin Gunsari	WARISAN	Not contested		Not contested		Not contested		Henry Saimpon	KDM	Terence Sinti	STAR	Joisin Romut	UPKO	Niyky @ Niky J Bosikol	IMPIAN	Trevor Kenneth Maringking	ANAK NEGERI	Dusi Gingging	PKS	Not contested		Not contested		Not contested		Not contested													
P171	Sepanggar	N16	Karambunai	39,247	Bajau	Yakubah Khan	BN (UMNO)	Arshad Idris	GAGASAN	Ahmad Jais Otong	WARISAN	Yakubah Khan	UMNO	Not contested		Aliakbar Gulasan	PAS	Not contested		Stephen Teo	STAR	Not contested		Adis Jalie	IMPIAN	Not contested		Matkri Kassim	PKS	Mohd Yunus Ibrahim	PBK	Not contested		Not contested		Hates Abdul	SPP	Azman Fathil	GAS	Saikam Salinggou	Perpaduan								
P171	Sepanggar	N17	Darau	33,016	Bajau	Azhar Matussin	WARISAN	Mohamed Razali Razi	GAGASAN	Azhar Matussin	WARISAN	Arfanshah Abdul Gafar	UMNO	Not contested		Nabila Norsahar	BERSATU	Nordin Thani	KDM	Not contested		Not contested		Merlah Osman	IMPIAN	Not contested		Not contested		Not contested		Not contested		Not contested		Not contested													
P171	Sepanggar	N18	Inanam	45,525	Kadazan Dusun	Peto Galim	PH (PKR)	Not contested		Edna Majimbun	WARISAN	Not contested		Peto Galim	PKR	Not contested		Lewis Wong Lee Kah	KDM	Kenny Chua Teck Ho	STAR	Wong Thien Fook	UPKO	Paul Anap	IMPIAN	Joseph Linggian @ Joseph Chong	ANAK NEGERI	Not contested		Gordon Lai Han Yung	PBK	Sumali @ Marino Ahmad	RUMPUN	Not contested		Not contested		Martin Sibit	GAS	Chia Yun Kong	PR	Shone Majimbun	Independent (BLACK)	Roland Chia Ming Shen	Independent				
P172	Kota Kinabalu	N19	Likas	19,100	Chinese	Tan Lee Fatt	PH (DAP)	Not contested		Tham Yun Fook	WARISAN	Not contested		Ginger Phoong Jin Zhe	DAP	Not contested		Not contested		Yong Yit Jee	SAPP	Not contested		Louis Yong Yin Loong	IMPIAN	Lam Hon Ket	ANAK NEGERI	Ku Yuck Cheong	PKS	Candy Chiew	PBK	Not contested		Not contested		Not contested													
P172	Kota Kinabalu	N20	Api-Api	17,782	Chinese	Christina Liew Chin Jin	PH (PKR)	Not contested		Loi Kok Liang	WARISAN	Not contested		Thonny Chee	PKR	Not contested		Not contested		Ting Shu Kiong	STAR	Not contested		Ng Chun Sua	IMPIAN	Not contested		Not contested		Soh Kee Suat	PBK	Not contested		Not contested		Not contested													
P172	Kota Kinabalu	N21	Luyang	35,262	Chinese	Ginger Phoong Jin Zhe	PH (DAP)	Not contested		Samuel Wong Tshun Chuen	WARISAN	Not contested		Chan Loong Wei	DAP	Ooi Hong Wee	GERAKAN	Not contested		Gee Tian Siong	SAPP	Not contested		Paul Chong Hock Keing	IMPIAN	Not contested		Not contested		Not contested		Not contested		Not contested		Not contested													
P173	Putatan	N22	Tanjung Aru	21,264	Bajau	Junz Wong Hong Jun	WARISAN	Not contested		Junz Wong Hong Jun	WARISAN	Not contested		Chan Foong Hin	DAP	Suhaimi Buang	BERSATU	Not contested		Hiew Choon Yu	STAR	Dennison R Indang	UPKO	Yee Wee Ping	IMPIAN	Not contested		Not contested		Loh Ee Eng	PBK	Not contested		Not contested		Not contested		Mohamed Zaim Ansawi	Independent (BLACK)	Ritchie Jay Cheng	Independent								
P173	Putatan	N23	Petagas	20,116	Bajau	Awang Ahmad Sah Awang Sahari	GRS (GAGASAN)	Not contested		Uda Sulai	WARISAN	Not contested		Awang Husaini Sahari	PKR	Mohd Afifi Shaiffuddin	PAS	Adelaide Cornelius	KDM	Annita Shiela Among	STAR	Jason Lee Nyuk Soon	UPKO	Aslin Samat	IMPIAN	Sabrezani Sabdin	ANAK NEGERI	Not contested		Not contested		Not contested		Not contested		Not contested		Patrick @ Peter Manius	Independent	Awang Ahmad Sah Awang Sahari	Independent	Patrick @ Peter Manius	Independent						
P173	Putatan	N24	Tanjung Keramat	26,113	Malay	Shahelmey Yahya	BN (UMNO)	Shah Alfie Yahya Ahmad Shah	GAGASAN	Mohammad Firdaus Diun	WARISAN	Jeffrey Nor Mohamed	UMNO	Not contested		Farish Adamz Shah @ Kanny	BERSATU	Sugarah @ Segarah Miasin	KDM	Azni Mohd Salleh	STAR	Rosdy Wasli	UPKO	Mahadthir Asbollah	IMPIAN	Mil Kusin Abdillah	ANAK NEGERI	Not contested		Jasni Matlani	PBK	Not contested		Not contested		Not contested		Saifullah Phang Abdul Malik	Independent										
P174	Penampang	N25	Kapayan	49,597	Chinese	Jannie Lasimbang	PH (DAP)	Not contested		Chin Tek Ming	WARISAN	Not contested		Jannie Lasimbang	DAP	Not contested		Edwin Bosi	KDM	Bernard Abel Logijin	STAR	Billy Joe Dominic	UPKO	Chin Ling Ling	IMPIAN	Wong Kong Fooh	ANAK NEGERI	Not contested		Kuo Lee On	PBK	Not contested		Not contested		Not contested		Sylvester Molukun @ Sylvester Chin	ASPIRASI	Lasius Miki	PR	Cyril Gerald Liew	Independent (BLACK)	Len Lip Fong @ Land Lip Fong	Independent	Sabaria @ Sabariah Aziz	Independent		
P174	Penampang	N26	Moyog	31,084	Kadazan Dusun	Darell Leiking	WARISAN	Joeynodd Bansin	PBS	Terrence Siambun	WARISAN	Not contested		Remysta Taylor	PKR	Francis Mojikon	BERSATU	Mckery Victor	KDM	Joeseph Suleiman	STAR	Donald Peter Mojuntin	UPKO	Cleftus Stephene Spine	IMPIAN	Not contested		Richard Ronald Dompok	PKS	Walter Norbert Johnny	PBK	Not contested		Not contested		Not contested		Ricky Chang Onn Pin	Independent (BLACK)	Peter Maurice Lidadun	Independent								
P175	Papar	N27	Limbahau	20,225	Kadazan Dusun	Juil Nuatim	GRS	Juil Nuatim	PBS	Roger Roy Valentine Amandus	WARISAN	Not contested		Not contested		Adrian Alexander	BERSATU	Malik Luman	KDM	Edward Dagul	SAPP	Nelson Angang	UPKO	Joseph Philip Kulip	IMPIAN	Julianus Moncigil	ANAK NEGERI	Not contested		Not contested		Not contested		Not contested		Not contested		Marcellus Tambud	Independent (BLACK)	Linda Beda Dunstan	Independent								
P175	Papar	N28	Kawang	23,823	Bajau	Ghulam Haidar Khan Bahadar	GRS (GAGASAN)	Ghulam Haidar Khan Bahadar	GAGASAN	Nin Jelih	WARISAN	Jamal Narubi	UMNO	Not contested		Not contested		Not contested		Beverley Natalie Koh	STAR	Not contested		Samail Bulongik	IMPIAN	Not contested		Not contested		Not contested		Not contested		Not contested		Not contested													
P175	Papar	N29	Pantai Manis	20,026	Brunei	Mohd Tamin Zainal	BN (UMNO)	Pg Saifuddin Pg Tahir Petra	GAGASAN	Aidi Moktar	WARISAN	Redzuan Kupamuthu @ Ismail	UMNO	Not contested		Faizal Julaili	BERSATU	Mohamad Tamin	KDM	Richard Vitales @ Charles	STAR	Not contested		Mohamad Azzmi Ahmad	IMPIAN	Ag Damit @ Ag Sahzain Abdul Razak	ANAK NEGERI	Not contested		Not contested		Not contested		Not contested		Not contested													
P176	Kimanis	N30	Bongawan	24,019	Kadazan Dusun	Daud Yusof	WARISAN	Anifah Aman	PCS	Daud Yusof	WARISAN	Mohamad Alamin	UMNO	Not contested		Ridzuan Agus Payong	BERSATU	Peter Matinjal	KDM	Dolores Michael	STAR	Not contested		Royston Adven	IMPIAN	Not contested		Not contested		Not contested		Not contested		Hussin Dasar @ Esah	PPRS	Not contested		Md Haris Md Tahir	Independent										
P176	Kimanis	N31	Membakut	18,563	Brunei	Mohd Arifin Mohd Arif	GRS (GAGASAN)	Mohd Arifin Mohd Arif	GAGASAN	Mohamad Said @ Ismail Said	WARISAN	Rusman Dulamit	UMNO	Not contested		Not contested		Not contested		Adrian Lajim	STAR	Rowindy Lawrence Odong	UPKO	Kamal Idris	IMPIAN	Yahya Ahmad	ANAK NEGERI	Suliaman Alladad	PKS	Not contested		Not contested		Aziz Angkiu @ Jaafar	PPRS	Not contested		Haslan Wasli	Independent (BLACK)										
P177	Beaufort	N32	Klias	22,277	Bisaya	Isnin Aliasnih	GRS (GAGASAN)	Isnin Aliasnih	GAGASAN	Mohd Shaid Othman	WARISAN	Osin Jilon	UMNO	Not contested		Mohamad Hisyam Hazaril	BERSATU	Mohamad Arifin Brahim	KDM	Not contested		Not contested		Matlani Sabli	IMPIAN	Not contested		Jismit Japong	PKS	Not contested		Not contested		Kaliwon Edi	PPRS	Not contested		Edwin Louis	Independent										
P177	Beaufort	N33	Kuala Penyu	22,288	Kadazan Dusun	Limus Jury	GRS (GAGASAN)	Limus Jury	GAGASAN	Monih Epin	WARISAN	Awang Aslee Lakat	UMNO	Not contested		Not contested		Not contested		Walter Philip Michael	STAR	Not contested		Dini Ginsik	IMPIAN	Not contested		Jonehtan Matheus	PKS	Not contested		Not contested		Not contested		Not contested													
P178	Sipitang	N34	Lumadan	22,165	Bisaya	Ruslan Muharam	GRS (PBS)	Ruslan Muharam	PBS	Mohammad Noorizuan Awang	WARISAN	Mohd Nazri Abdullah	UMNO	Not contested		Not contested		Abdul Jarih Ukin	KDM	Amit Basrin	STAR	Not contested		Jurinah Nasir	IMPIAN	Not contested		Not contested		Not contested		Not contested		Not contested		Not contested													
P178	Sipitang	N35	Sindumin	25,536	Kedayan	Yusof Yacob	GRS (GAGASAN)	Not contested		Yusri Pungut	WARISAN	Not contested		Yamani Hafez Musa	PKR	Dg Nor Syafiqah Hamid	BERSATU	Sani Miasin	KDM	Moktar Matussin	STAR	Not contested		Markus Buas	IMPIAN	Not contested		Kanafia Bujang	PKS	Not contested		Not contested		Not contested		Not contested		Abdillah Jalaf	Independent	Ibrahim Tuah @ Jipun	Independent	Wilson Liou	Independent						
P179	Ranau	N36	Kundasang	24,582	Kadazan Dusun	Joachim Gunsalam	GRS (PBS)	Joachim Gunsalam	PBS	Jeffrey Guopog	WARISAN	Japirin Sahadi	PBRS	Not contested		Atong Antong	BERSATU	Jeffry Mohd Ali	KDM	Japiril Suhaimin Bandaran	SAPP	Rogers Tiam	UPKO	Edward Jamkim @ Paul Arif	IMPIAN	Nazarul Khaiwala Wahab	ANAK NEGERI	Not contested		Not contested		Not contested		Not contested		Not contested		Jackson Musi	Independent										
P179	Ranau	N37	Karanaan	18,696	Kadazan Dusun	Masidi Manjun	GRS (GAGASAN)	Masidi Manjun	GAGASAN	Mukinin Malapan	WARISAN	Nadzmin Kaim	UMNO	Not contested		Not contested		Karim Adam	KDM	Anuar Ghani	STAR	Georgina L George	UPKO	Not contested		Not contested		Not contested		Not contested		Not contested		Not contested		Not contested		Naomi @ Neomi Francis	Independent										
P179	Ranau	N38	Paginatan	26,881	Kadazan Dusun	Abidin Madingkir	STAR	Abidin Madingkir	GRS	Juhaili Sidek	WARISAN	Junaidi Sahat	UMNO	Not contested		Not contested		Rusdin Riman	KDM	Feddrin Tuliang	STAR	Not contested		Linus Yubod @ Md Haidi Md Badawi	IMPIAN	Rubica Gabayoi	ANAK NEGERI	Not contested		Not contested		Not contested		Not contested		Not contested		Vennex Jasmin @ Miki	PBM	Bensin @ Sin Dani	PR	Ivan Mario Benedict	Independent						
P180	Keningau	N39	Tambunan	29,187	Kadazan Dusun	Jeffrey Gapari Kitingan	STAR	Victor P Paut	GAGASAN	Bianus Kontong	WARISAN	Not contested		Not contested		Not contested		Jikol Tagua	KDM	Jeffrey Gapari Kitingan	STAR	Not contested		Kenneth Edwin N	IMPIAN	Dionysia Ginsos	ANAK NEGERI	Not contested		Not contested		Not contested		Not contested		Gulit Rukag	SPP												
P180	Keningau	N40	Bingkor	31,305	Kadazan Dusun	Robert Tawik	STAR	Rafie Robert	GAGASAN	Benedict Martin Gunir	WARISAN	Not contested		Not contested		Not contested		Niklos Ongoh	KDM	Mohd Ishak Ayub	STAR	Kennedy John	UPKO	Kenolee Justine	IMPIAN	Not contested		Uling @ Thomas Anggan	PKS	Not contested		Not contested		Not contested		Solzah Sual	SPP	Haryady Antutu	GAS	Ahamin Salim	Independent								
P180	Keningau	N41	Liawan	32,661	Kadazan Dusun	Annuar Ayub Aman	STAR	Annuar Ayub Aman	GRS	Adzhar Jasni Eddy	WARISAN	Nik Mohd Nadzri Nik Zawawi	UMNO	Not contested		Johny @ John Anthony	BERSATU	Peter Paun	KDM	Augustine A Nain	STAR	Wilson Gan Poi Tze	UPKO	Junadey Ejih	IMPIAN	Not contested		Not contested		Not contested		Yukilin Giging	RUMPUN	Mustazarmie Mustapha	PPRS	Not contested													
P181	Tenom	N42	Melalap	21,320	Murut	Vacant (Note: The seat incumbent Peter Anthony (KDM) loses his seat after losing his court case appeal and being sentenced to jail on 4 March 2025.)	VAC	Not contested		Cheld Bryend Lind	WARISAN	Not contested		Jamawi Ja’afar	PKR	Not contested		Priscella Peter	KDM	Alviana Linus	STAR	Junik Banjit	UPKO	Kelvin Chong	IMPIAN	Not contested		Not contested		Not contested		Not contested		Not contested		Not contested		Gabriel George Tulas	Independent (BLACK)	Fatimah Ibrahim	Independent								
P181	Tenom	N43	Kemabong	23,168	Murut	Rubin Balang	GRS (GAGASAN)	Rubin Balang	GAGASAN	Burnley Balang	WARISAN	Rahman Jan Sulaiman	UMNO	Noorita Sual	DAP	Not contested		Yabri Onos	KDM	Hasmin @ Azroy Abdullah	STAR	Not contested		Jasini Angkiwan	IMPIAN	Not contested		Not contested		Not contested		Not contested		Rassedi Liaron	PPRS	Not contested		Petrus Eddy Yahya	Independent (BLACK)										
P182	Pensiangan	N44	Tulid	16,551	Kadazan Dusun	Flovia Ng	STAR	Not contested		Lucia Kihing	WARISAN	Not contested		Rufinah Pengeran	PKR	Not contested		Aisat Ellik Igau Iggau	KDM	Baristus Gungkit	STAR	Mohd Khairil Abdullah	UPKO	Anchis @ Rayner Francis Udog	IMPIAN	Not contested		Vinson Rusikan	PKS	Not contested		Jufina Dimis @ Hasnizah Abdullah	RUMPUN	Not contested		Not contested		Suman @ Sunsunah Yasambun	Independent	Jordan Jude Ellron	Independent	Clarence Carter Maraat	Independent	Edwin Laimin	Independent	Engah Sintan @ Dahlan Abdullah	Independent	Lautis @ Laulis Anggang	Independent
P182	Pensiangan	N45	Sook	20,349	Murut	Ellron Alfred Angin	STAR	Ellron Alfred Angin	GRS	Joseph Peter Tingi	WARISAN	Arthur Joseph Kurup	PBRS	Not contested		Not contested		Not contested		Irenus Pagut	STAR	Not contested		V Chong Vin @ Siau Ho	IMPIAN	Not contested		Not contested		Not contested		Not contested		Not contested		Not contested													
P182	Pensiangan	N46	Nabawan	23,392	Murut	Abdul Ghani Mohamed Yassin	GRS (GAGASAN)	Abdul Ghani Mohamed Yassin	GAGASAN	Alfian A Koroh	WARISAN	Laiji Ompongoh	UMNO	Not contested		Sayau Tangkap	BERSATU	Jekerison Kilan	KDM	Akuang Suan	STAR	Junilin @ Jubilin Kilan	UPKO	Rejoh Ondoh	IMPIAN	Not contested		Farney Akon	PKS	Not contested		Not contested		Not contested		Not contested													
P183	Beluran	N47	Telupid	14,965	Kadazan Dusun	Jonnybone Kurum	GRS (PBS)	Jonnybone Kurum	PBS	Simah Matusip	WARISAN	Benedict Asmat	UMNO	Not contested		Jamin Jamri	BERSATU	Nilis Joseph	KDM	Jikmariya Muran	STAR	Felix Joseph Sitin	UPKO	Michael Alok	IMPIAN	Not contested		Not contested		Not contested		Not contested		Not contested		Not contested		Pagrios @ Petrus Zabang	PBM										
P183	Beluran	N48	Sugut	18,435	Sungai	James Ratib	GRS (GAGASAN)	James Ratib	GAGASAN	Aspah Abdullah Sani	WARISAN	Arifin Pachuk	UMNO	Not contested		Ronald Kiandee	BERSATU	Not contested		Not contested		Not contested		Rosely Lajun	IMPIAN	Not contested		Not contested		Not contested		Not contested		Hassan Mentiak	PPRS	Not contested		Roger Langgau	Independent (BLACK)										
P183	Beluran	N49	Labuk	14,564	Kadazan Dusun	Samad Jambri	GRS (GAGASAN)	Samad Jambri	GAGASAN	Jafar Awang	WARISAN	Yusuflatif Mustapah	UMNO	Not contested		Asmad Nasir	BERSATU	Marx Henry Lim	KDM	Not contested		Norfadzlina Ramsah	UPKO	Junsik @ Joseph Imus	IMPIAN	Nuralizah Lee Abdullah	ANAK NEGERI	Not contested		Not contested		Not contested		Not contested		Not contested													
P184	Libaran	N50	Gum-Gum	19,433	Malay	Arunarsin Taib	WARISAN	Not contested		Arunarsin Taib	WARISAN	Not contested		Abdul Said Pimping	PKR	Yunus Nurdin	BERSATU	Not contested		Not contested		Peter Jr Naintin	UPKO	Esnin Satur	IMPIAN	Not contested		Not contested		Not contested		Not contested		Not contested		Not contested		Mohd Yusuf Yoda	Independent (BLACK)	Asmawi Asa	Independent	Fadly Voon	Independent	Salzo Asa	Independent				
P184	Libaran	N51	Sungai Manila	18,217	Malay	Mokran Ingkat	BN (UMNO)	Hazem Mubarak Musa	GAGASAN	Sittinara Sakar	WARISAN	Zaini Tiksun	UMNO	Not contested		Yusri Abu	BERSATU	Not contested		Not contested		Not contested		Irian Nanang	IMPIAN	Not contested		Not contested		Not contested		Not contested		Faizal Wahab	PPRS	Not contested													
P184	Libaran	N52	Sungai Sibuga	38,678	Malay	Vacant (Note: Incumbent Mohamad Hamsan Awang Supain (BN-UMNO) died from kidney failure on 19 January 2025.)	VAC	Amirshah Yaakub	GAGASAN	Nurulalsah Hassan Alban	WARISAN	Suhaimi Nasir	UMNO	Not contested		Norani Asmatil	BERSATU	Not contested		Not contested		Not contested		Ismail Md Said	IMPIAN	Not contested		Not contested		Not contested		Not contested		Not contested		Not contested													
P185	Batu Sapi	N53	Sekong	27,518	Chinese	Alias Sani	WARISAN	Diana Diego @ Yusrina Sufiana	USNO	Alias Sani	WARISAN	Mohd Zharif Aizat Samsuddin	UMNO	Not contested		Mohd Fazruee Awang	BERSATU	Not contested		Not contested		Not contested		Abada Atalad	IMPIAN	Not contested		Not contested		Not contested		Not contested		Mohd Noor Yusof	PPRS	Not contested		Arifin Asgali	Independent										
P185	Batu Sapi	N54	Karamunting	19,615	Chinese	George Hiew Vun Zin	GRS (GAGASAN)	Not contested		Alex Wong Tshun Khee	WARISAN	Chin Kim Hung	MCA	George Hiew Vun Zin	PKR	Not contested		Chew Kok Woh	KDM	Not contested		Not contested		Soo Ming Soon	IMPIAN	Not contested		Not contested		Not contested		Not contested		Not contested		Not contested													
P186	Sandakan	N55	Elopura	39,004	Chinese	Calvin Chong Ket Kiun	WARISAN	Not contested		Calvin Chong Ket Kiun	WARISAN	Not contested		Vivian Wong Shir Yee	DAP	Mohd Firdaus Silvester Abdullah	GERAKAN	Liau Fui Fui	KDM	Not contested		Not contested		Jeffrey Chung Cheong Yung	IMPIAN	Not contested		Not contested		Not contested		Not contested		Wong Hon Kong	PPRS	Not contested		Lita Tan Abdullah	Independent										
P186	Sandakan	N56	Tanjong Papat	16,767	Chinese	Frankie Poon Ming Fung	PH (DAP)	Not contested		Alex Thien Ching Qiang	WARISAN	Not contested		Tang Szu Ching	DAP	Koa Wei Yang	GERAKAN	Frankie Poon Ming Fung	KDM	Henley Liew Yun Ye	SAPP	Not contested		Jainudin Berahim	IMPIAN	Not contested		Sohaimi Ramli	PKS	Not contested		Not contested		Not contested		Not contested		Mohd Yunus Apil	PR										
P187	Kinabatangan	N57	Kuamut	18,228	Sungai	Masiung Banah	GRS (GAGASAN)	Masiung Banah	GAGASAN	Norfaizah Chua	WARISAN	Not contested		Not contested		Not contested		Abu Bakar Ellah	KDM	Jevronnie Mandek	STAR	Mohina Sidom	UPKO	Ted Kelvin Sudin	IMPIAN	Not contested		Not contested		Not contested		Not contested		John Sungkiang	PPRS	Not contested		Duin Daud Tarang	Independent										
P187	Kinabatangan	N58	Lamag	13,859	Sungai	Bung Moktar Radin	BN (UMNO)	Johainizamshah Johari	GAGASAN	Mohd Saifulah Lokman	WARISAN	Bung Moktar Radin	UMNO	Not contested		Mazlin Madali	BERSATU	Not contested		Not contested		Not contested		Salahuddin Anoi	IMPIAN	Not contested		Not contested		Not contested		Not contested		Not contested		Not contested		Mohd Ismail Ayob	Independent										
P187	Kinabatangan	N59	Sukau	16,541	Sungai	Jafry Ariffin	BN (UMNO)	Juhari Janan	GAGASAN	Azhari Rangon	WARISAN	Jafry Ariffin	UMNO	Not contested		Pengiran Petra Pengiran Asri	BERSATU	Not contested		Not contested		Not contested		Roslan Madali	IMPIAN	Not contested		Afiq Anwari Zulkifli	PKS	Not contested		Not contested		Not contested		Not contested		Nordin Damit	PR										
P188	Lahad Datu	N60	Tungku	24,741	Bajau	Assaffal P. Alian	WARISAN	Abdul Hakim Gulam Hassan	GAGASAN	Assaffal P. Alian	WARISAN	Saleha Wahid	UMNO	Not contested		Not contested		Not contested		Suling Isib	STAR	Not contested		Hairunnizam Kamsin	IMPIAN	Not contested		Jani Kulmen	PKS	Not contested		Not contested		Jakaria Nasiran	PPRS	Not contested													
P188	Lahad Datu	N61	Segama	29,840	Chinese	Mohammadin Ketapi	BN (UMNO)	Not contested		Muhammad Abdul Karim	WARISAN	Not contested		Romansa Laimin	PKR	Not contested		Not contested		Yvone Yong Yit Phung	SAPP	Not contested		Ehtisham Ur Rahman Mhaulaha	IMPIAN	Not contested		Not contested		Not contested		Not contested		Not contested		Not contested		Mohamaddin Ketapi	Independent	Alif Afiandy Ali	Independent	Norman Kasimin	Independent						
P188	Lahad Datu	N62	Silam	28,261	Bajau	Dumi Pg Masdal	WARISAN	Mizma Appehdullah	GAGASAN	Yusof Apdal	WARISAN	Sharif Musa Sharif Mabul	UMNO	Abd Halim Sidek Gulam Hassan (Note: Subsequently withdrawing his candidacy, however his name will remain in the ballot paper as Sidek's withdrawal is after the end of nomination period.)	PKR	Borkes @ Balkis Kalinggalan	BERSATU	Not contested		Not contested		Not contested		Brahim Bisel	IMPIAN	Not contested		Mohd Syafiq Iqhmal Saharudin	PKS	Not contested		Not contested		Not contested		Mohammad Enriquez	SPP	Amat Kawoh @ Abd Rahman	Independent										
P188	Lahad Datu	N63	Kunak	24,854	Bajau	Norazlinah Arif	GRS (GAGASAN)	Norazlinah Arif	GAGASAN	Jasa Ismail Raudah	WARISAN	Anil Jeet Singh	UMNO	Not contested		Kasman Karate	PAS	Not contested		Not contested		Not contested		Roselih Lumayan	IMPIAN	Not contested		Not contested		Not contested		Not contested		Ismu Isyam Arsad	PPRS	Not contested													
P189	Semporna	N64	Sulabayan	20,258	Bajau	Jaujan Sambakong	WARISAN	Not contested		Jaujan Sambakong	WARISAN	Not contested		Julpikar Ab Mijan	AMANAH	Abdul Malik Abd Bool	BERSATU	Not contested		Bidin Jawa	STAR	Not contested		Mat Roya @ Abdul Mutalib Jaafar	IMPIAN	Hasman Sagaran	ANAK NEGERI	Not contested		Not contested		Not contested		Sumini Yasintus	PPRS	Not contested		Abdillah Abdul Hamid	Independent										
P189	Semporna	N65	Senallang	20,763	Bajau	Shafie Apdal	WARISAN	Marunda K K Ampong	GAGASAN	Shafie Apdal	WARISAN	Not contested		Not contested		Not contested		Not contested		Not contested		Not contested		Mohd Lipai @ Samsu Sundalu	IMPIAN	Not contested		Not contested		Not contested		Not contested		Not contested		Not contested		Abdul Majid Angkulan	MUPP										
P189	Semporna	N66	Bugaya	36,569	Bajau	Jamil Hamzah	WARISAN	Noorudin Abdul Hussin	GAGASAN	Jamil Hamzah	WARISAN	Abdul Manan Indanan	UMNO	Not contested		Jamil Abdul Gapar	BERSATU	Not contested		Mohd Taha Mohd Daha	STAR	Not contested		Arman Marasal	IMPIAN	Not contested		Not contested		Not contested		Suffian Ahmad	RUMPUN	Not contested		Not contested		Maulana Unding	ASPIRASI	Roslan Ali	PR								
P190	Tawau	N67	Balung	22,252	Malay	Hamid Awang	GRS (GAGASAN)	Syed Ahmad Syed Abas	GAGASAN	Frank Salazar	WARISAN	Erwan Palateh	UMNO	Not contested		Munizer Mahamaud	PAS	Not contested		Chee Kheng Moi	STAR	Not contested		Ugis Pula	IMPIAN	Not contested		Not contested		Ahmad Awang	PBK	Norazizah Palari	RUMPUN	Rosdiansa Mohd Noor	PPRS	Not contested		Hartono Mohamad Juno	Independent (BLACK)	Shafie Hassan	Independent								
P190	Tawau	N68	Apas	32,241	Malay	Nizam Abu Bakar Titingan	GRS (GAGASAN)	Nizam Abu Bakar Titingan	GAGASAN	Sarman Amat Simito	WARISAN	Elmiariezan Ardan	UMNO	Not contested		Lim Ting Khai	BERSATU	Not contested		Not contested		Not contested		Herman Amdas	IMPIAN	Not contested		Not contested		Not contested		Not contested		Marisah Omat	PPRS	Not contested													
P190	Tawau	N69	Sri Tanjong	37,327	Chinese	Justin Wong Yung Bin	WARISAN	Not contested		Justin Wong Yung Bin	WARISAN	Not contested		Philip Yap Wui Lip	DAP	Not contested		Ricky Hong Chee Kiong	KDM	Fung Len Fui	STAR	Not contested		Joseph Mosusah	IMPIAN	Not contested		Not contested		Not contested		Not contested		Not contested		Not contested		Wong Su Vui	Independent										
P191	Kalabakan	N70	Kukusan	19,225	Bugis	Rina Jainal	GRS (PHRS)	Samsiah Usman	PHRS	Ma'mun Sulaiman	WARISAN	Chaya Sulaiman	UMNO	Not contested		Francis Lawrence @ Yusop	BERSATU	Not contested		Ab Rahman Yahya	STAR	Not contested		Razik Muyong	IMPIAN	Mariani Sulaiman	ANAK NEGERI	Not contested		Not contested		Not contested		Ishak Ismail	PPRS	Not contested		Hairul Amin	Independent (BLACK)	Rina Jainal	Independent								
P191	Kalabakan	N71	Tanjung Batu	27,428	Bugis	Andi Muhammad Suryandy Bandy	BN (UMNO)	Andi Md Shamsureezal Mohd Sainal	GAGASAN	Ayuf Abdul Rahman	WARISAN	Samasuddin Yusop	UMNO	Not contested		Ahmad Dullah	PAS	Not contested		Not contested		Not contested		Zanudin Mingo	IMPIAN	Not contested		Not contested		Not contested		Not contested		Not contested		Not contested													
P191	Kalabakan	N72	Merotai	26,179	Bugis	Sarifuddin Hata	WARISAN	Not contested		Sarifuddin Hata	WARISAN	Not contested		Ruji Ubi	PKR	Hasan Haris	PAS	Not contested		Not contested		Not contested		Rhyme Kassim	IMPIAN	Not contested		Not contested		Not contested		Not contested		Not contested		Not contested													
P191	Kalabakan	N73	Sebatik	16,893	Tidong	Hassan A. Gani Pg. Amir	GRS (GAGASAN)	Hassan A. Gani Pg. Amir	GAGASAN	Manahing Tinggilani	WARISAN	Aslan Fadli Samsul Alang	UMNO	Not contested		Suhurani Sammani	BERSATU	Not contested		Kadri Amat	STAR	Not contested		Abdul Gaib Aliaman	IMPIAN	Sahran Untai	ANAK NEGERI	Not contested		Not contested		Ismail Idris	RUMPUN	Abu Bakar Kumun	PPRS	Not contested		Husni Frans	Independent										

=== Statistics and Summary ===
596 candidates are nominated in this election.

Constituencies by number of candidates.

==== Nominations by parties and independent candidates. ====
Alliance / Party / Independent		Number of candidates
Independent		74
Parti Warisan		73
Parti Impian Sabah (PIS)		72
Gabungan Rakyat Sabah (GRS)	Parti Gagasan Rakyat Sabah (GAGASAN)	37
Gabungan Rakyat Sabah (GRS)	Parti Bersatu Sabah (PBS)	11
Gabungan Rakyat Sabah (GRS)	GRS Direct Membership	3
Gabungan Rakyat Sabah (GRS)	Pertubuhan Kebangsaan Sabah Bersatu (USNO)	2
Gabungan Rakyat Sabah (GRS)	Parti Cinta Sabah (PCS)	1
Gabungan Rakyat Sabah (GRS)	Parti Harapan Rakyat Sabah (PHRS)	1
Gabungan Rakyat Sabah (GRS)	Total	55
Gerakan Bersatu Sabah (SUM)	Parti Solidariti Tanah Airku (STAR)	46
Gerakan Bersatu Sabah (SUM)	Parti Maju Sabah (SAPP)	6
Gerakan Bersatu Sabah (SUM)	total	52
Barisan Nasional (BN)	Pertubuhan Kebangsaan Melayu Bersatu (UMNO)	41
Barisan Nasional (BN)	Malaysian Chinese Association (MCA)	2
Barisan Nasional (BN)	Parti Bersatu Rakyat Sabah (PBRS)	2
Barisan Nasional (BN)	Total	45
Perikatan Nasional (PN)	Parti Pribumi Bersatu Malaysia (BERSATU)	33
Perikatan Nasional (PN)	Parti Islam Se-Malaysia (PAS)	6
Perikatan Nasional (PN)	Parti Gerakan Rakyat Malaysia (GERAKAN)	3
Perikatan Nasional (PN)	Total	42
Parti Kesejahteraan Demokratik Masyarakat (KDM)		40
Pertubuhan Kinabalu Progresif Bersatu (UPKO)		25
Pakatan Harapan (PH)	Parti Keadilan Rakyat (PKR)	13
Pakatan Harapan (PH)	Democratic Action Party (DAP)	8
Pakatan Harapan (PH)	Parti Amanah Negara (AMANAH)	1
Pakatan Harapan (PH)	Total	22
Parti Kebangsaan Sabah (PKS)		20
Parti Kerjasama Anak Negeri (Anak Negeri)		17
Parti Perpaduan Rakyat Sabah (PPRS)		16
Parti Bumi Kenyalang (PBK)		14
Parti Rumpun Sabah (Rumpun)		7
Perjuangan Rakyat (PR)		6
Parti Damai Sabah (SPP)		5
Pertubuhan Gemilang Anak Sabah (GAS)		3
Parti Bangsa Malaysia (PBM)		3
Parti Aspirasi Rakyat Sarawak (ASPIRASI)		3
Parti Bersatu Sasa Malaysia (MUPP)		1
Pertubuhan Perpaduan Rakyat Kebangsaaan Sabah (PERPADUAN)		1
Total		596

==== Seats contested by candidates. ====
Number of candidates	Number of seats contested
4-way contest	2 (Note: Seats are N65 Senallang, N72 Merotai.)
5-way contest	8 (Note: Seats are N12 Sulaman, N20 Api-Api, N21 Luyang, N28 Kawang, N45 Sook, N52 Sungai Sibuga, N54 Karamunting, N71 Tanjung Batu.)
6-way contest	13 (Note: Seats are N03 Pitas, N05 Matunggong, N10 Usukan, N17 Darau, N19 Likas, N33 Kuala Penyu, N34 Lumadan, N51 Sungai Manila, N53 Sekong, N58 Lamag, N63 Kunak, N68 Apas, N69 Sri Tanjong.)
7-way contest	10 (Note: Seats are N09 Tempasuk, N13 Pantai Dalit, N29 Pantai Manis, N37 Karanaan, N39 Tambunan, N48 Sugut, N55 Elopura, N59 Sukau, N60 Tungku, N61 Segama.)
8-way contest	8 (Note: Seats are N07 Tandek N11 Kadamaian, N15 Kiulu, N42 Melalap, N49 Labuk, N56 Tanjong Papat, N57 Kuamut, N64 Sulabayan.)
9-way contest	10 (Note: Seats are N22 Tanjung Aru, N27 Limbahau, N30 Bongawan, N32 Klias, N43 Kemabong, N46 Nabawan, N47 Telupid, N50 Labuk, N62 Silam, N66 Bugaya.)
10-way contest	9 (Note: Seats are N23 Petagas, N31 Membakut, N35 Sindumin, N36 Kundasang, N38 Paginatan, N40 Bingkor, N41 Liawan, N70 Kukusan, N73 Sebatik.)
11-way contest	6 (Note: Seats are N02 Bengkoka, N04 Tanjong Kapor, N08 Pintasan, N16 Karambunai, N24 Tanjung Keramat, N67 Balung.)
12-way contest	2 (Note: Seats are N01 Banggi, N26 Moyog.)
13-way contest	4 (Note: Seats are N06 Bandau, N14 Tamparuli, N18 Inanam, N25 Kapayan.)
14-way contest	1 (Note: Seats are N44 Tulid.)

==== Candidates gender ====
Gender	Number of candidates
Male	525
Female	71

==== Candidates age range ====
Age range	Number of candidates
20 - 29	8
30 - 39	59
40 - 49	146
50 - 59	178
60 and above	205

== Opinion polls ==
Opinion polls for the 2025 Sabah state election have been conducted by various organizations to gauge public support for political parties and coalitions. Below is a summary of recent polls.

Pollster	Dates conducted	Sample size	PH	PN	BN	GRS (Note: Includes candidates from Barisan Nasional and Perikatan Nasional)	WARISAN	Others	Undecided	Lead	Ref
2025 Sabah state election	29 November 2025	-	6.7%	3.7%	12.8%	25.4%	25.6%	25.8%	-	WARISAN +0.2	
Universiti Teknologi MARA (UiTM)	28 November 2025	-	19%	4%	25%	25%	22%	5%	-	GRS/BN +3	[31]
Vodus	June 2025	536	10%	–	13%	25%	9%	11%	32%	GRS +12	
Vodus	1–10 October 2024	600	21%	14%	10%	50%	–	5%	–	GRS +29	
2020 Sabah state election	26 September 2020	–	–	–	–	43.2%	43.4% (Note: As Warisan+, which includes candidates from Pakatan Harapan)	13.4%	–	WARISAN +0.2	–

== Results ==
29 November 2025 Result (73 seats)
Coalition
29		25	6		5	3	2	1	1	1
GRS		WARISAN	BN		Independents	UPKO	STAR	PH	PN	KDM
Party Breakdown
22	7	25	5	1	5	3	2	1	1	1
GAGASAN	PBS	WARISAN	UMNO	PBRS	Independents	UPKO	STAR	PKR	PAS	KDM

=== Summary ===
2025 Sabah State Election
Party or alliance		Votes	%	Seats	+/–
Sabah Heritage Party		288,703	25.57	25	+11
Gabungan Rakyat Sabah	Parti Gagasan Rakyat Sabah	204,412	18.11	22	-9
Gabungan Rakyat Sabah	United Sabah Party	55,909	4.95	7	0
Gabungan Rakyat Sabah	United Sabah National Organisation (New)	5,326	0.47	0	0
Gabungan Rakyat Sabah	Love Sabah Party	4,604	0.41	0	0
Gabungan Rakyat Sabah	Sabah People's Hope Party	2,063	0.18	0	0
Gabungan Rakyat Sabah	Gabungan Rakyat Sabah Direct candidates	14,075	1.25	0	0
Gabungan Rakyat Sabah	Total	286,389	25.37	29	-9
Barisan Nasional	United Malays National Organisation	130,648	11.57	5	-8
Barisan Nasional	Sabah United People's Party	10,184	0.90	1	+1
Barisan Nasional	Malaysian Chinese Association	3,752	0.33	0	0
Barisan Nasional	Total	144,584	12.81	6	-7
Pakatan Harapan	People's Justice Party	39,747	3.52	1	-1
Pakatan Harapan	Democratic Action Party	34,786	3.08	0	-4
Pakatan Harapan	National Trust Party	1,405	0.12	0	0
Pakatan Harapan	Total	75,938	6.73	1	-5
Homeland Solidarity Party		73,410	6.50	2	-4
United Progressive Kinabalu Organisation		64,471	5.71	3	+2
Social Democratic Harmony Party		54,050	4.79	1	-1
Perikatan Nasional	Malaysian United Indigenous Party	24,978	2.21	0	0
Perikatan Nasional	Malaysian Islamic Party	15,214	1.35	1	+1
Perikatan Nasional	Parti Gerakan Rakyat Malaysia	1,392	0.12	0	0
Perikatan Nasional	Total	41,584	3.68	1	1
Parti Impian Sabah		13,265	1.17	0	0
Sabah Progressive Party		7,733	0.68	0	0
Sabah Native Co-operation Party		1,542	0.14	0	0
Sabah Nationality Party		1,477	0.13	0	0
Perjuangan Rakyat		1,414	0.13	0	0
Parti Bumi Kenyalang		1,337	0.12	0	0
Sabah People's Unity Party		1,124	0.10	0	0
Parti Rumpun Sabah		898	0.08	0	0
Sabah Peace Party		429	0.04	0	0
Pertubuhan Gemilang Anak Sabah		293	0.03	0	0
Parti Bangsa Malaysia		213	0.02	0	0
Parti Aspirasi Rakyat Sarawak		141	0.01	0	0
Malaysian United People's Party		131	0.01	0	0
Sabah National People's Unity Organisation		73	0.01	0	0
Independents		69,771	6.18	5	+2
Total		1,128,970	100.00	73	–
Valid votes		1,128,970	98.30		
Invalid/blank votes		19,506	1.70		
Total votes		1,148,476	100.00		
Registered voters/turnout		1,784,843	64.35		
Source: Election Commissioners of Malaysia

=== By parliamentary constituency ===
No.	Constituency	Gabungan Rakyat Sabah	Heritage Party	Barisan Nasional	Pakatan Harapan	STAR + SAPP	Others	Member of Parliament
P167	Kudat	33.68%	22.82%	11.50%	—N/a	4.81%	27.20%	Verdon Bahanda
P168	Kota Marudu	37.52%	8.14%	0.70%	4.84%	10.64%	38.16%	Wetrom Bahanda
P169	Kota Belud	26.65%	20.10%	16.60%	—N/a	4.40%	32.24%	Isnaraissah Munirah Majilis
P170	Tuaran	45.76%	9.06%	10.37%	—N/a	8.79%	26.02%	Wilfred Madius Tangau
P171	Sepanggar	17.53%	32.74%	9.18%	6.35%	7.56%	26.64%	Mustapha Sakmud
P172	Kota Kinabalu	—N/a	59.81%	—N/a	29.13%	7.69%	3.37%	Chan Foong Hin
P173	Putatan	13.13%	29.65%	10.47%	12.78%	2.31%	31.67%	Shahelmey Yahya
P174	Penampang	3.23%	42.09%	—N/a	12.55%	9.12%	33.01%	Ewon Benedick
P175	Papar	52.47%	15.04%	15.92%	—N/a	4.66%	11.91%	Armizan Mohd Ali
P176	Kimanis	31.86%	24.01%	25.49%	—N/a	3.90%	15.15%	Mohamad Alamin
P177	Beaufort	46.97%	29.06%	29.06%	—N/a	4.30%	6.88%	Siti Aminah Aching
P178	Sipitang	25.74%	24.60%	12.00%	15.26%	6.06%	16.34%	Matbali Musah
P179	Ranau	35.87%	5.04%	12.58%	—N/a	9.95%	36.56%	Jonathan Yasin
P180	Keningau	24.17%	12.27%	9.84%	—N/a	43.24%	10.48%	Jeffrey Kitingan
P181	Tenom	20.48%	5.71%	9.31%	29.98%	1.63%	32.88%	Riduan Rubin
P182	Pensiangan	22.04%	7.60%	29.61%	4.05%	10.08%	26.62%	Arthur Joseph Kurup
P183	Beluran	40.80%	11.36%	14.13%	—N/a	1.08%	32.63%	Ronald Kiandee
P184	Libaran	24.20%	27.85%	21.47%	4.16%	—N/a	22.33%	Suhaimi Nasir
P185	Batu Sapi	6.74%	42.32%	23.45%	14.25%	—N/a	13.24%	Khairul Firdaus Akbar Khan
P186	Sandakan	—N/a	41.83%	—N/a	26.35%	0.33%	31.50%	Vivian Wong Shir Yee
P187	Kinabatangan	31.23%	10.90%	26.88%	—N/a	1.92%	29.01%	Bung Moktar Radin
P188	Lahad Datu	21.76%	38.02%	16.51%	5.78%	7.03%	10.90%	Yusof Apdal
P189	Semporna	13.00%	72.57%	4.42%	3.46%	1.70%	4.86%	Shafie Apdal
P190	Tawau	27.72%	36.02%	7.62%	13.23%	2.99%	12.41%	Lo Su Fui
P191	Kalabakan	19.46%	33.80%	15.39%	9.23%	0.75%	21.36%	Andi Muhammad Suryady Bandy

=== Lost deposits ===
Alliance / Party / Independents		Total
Parti Impian Sabah (PIS)		72 (Note: Seats are N.01 Banggi, N.02 Bengkoka, N.03 Pitas, N.04 Tanjong Kapor, N.05 Matunggong, N.06 Bandau, N.07 Tandek, N.08 Pintasan, N.09 Tempasuk, N.10 Usukan, N.11 Kadamaian, N.12 Sulaman, N.13 Pantai Dalit, N.14 Tamparuli, N.15 Kiulu, N.16 Karambunai, N.17 Darau, N.18 Inanam, N.19 Likas, N.20 Api-Api, N.21 Luyang, N.22 Tanjung Aru, N.23 Petagas, N.24 Tanjung Keramat, N.25 Kapayan, N.26 Moyog, N.27 Limbahau, N.28 Kawang, N.29 Pantai Manis, N.30 Bongawan, N.31 Membakut, N.32 Klias, N.33 Kuala Penyu, N.34 Lumadan, N.35 Sindumin, N.36 Kundasang, N.38 Paginatan, N.39 Tambunan, N.40 Bingkor, N.41 Liawan, N.42 Melalap, N.43 Kemabong, N.44 Tulid, N.45 Sook, N.46 Nabawan, N.47 Telupid, N.48 Sugut, N.49 Labuk, N.50 Gum-Gum, N.51 Sungai Manila, N.52 Sungai Sibuga, N.53 Sekong, N.54 Karamunting, N.55 Elopura, N.56 Tanjong Papat, N.57 Kuamut, N.58 Lamag, N.59 Sukau, N.60 Tungku, N.61 Segama, N.62 Silam, N.63 Kunak, N.64 Sulabayan, N.65 Senallang, N.66 Bugaya, N.67 Balung, N.68 Apas, N.69 Sri Tanjong, N.70 Kukusan, N.71 Tanjung Batu, N.72 Merotai, N.73 Sebatik.)
Independent		60 (Note: Seats are N.01 Banggi, N.02 Bengkoka, N.03 Pitas, N.04 Tanjong Kapor, N.05 Matunggong, N.06 Bandau, N.08 Pintasan, N.10 Usukan, N.14 Tamparuli, N.18 Inanam, N.22 Tanjung Aru, N.23 Petagas, N.24 Tanjung Keramat, N.25 Kapayan, N.26 Moyog, N.27 Limbahau, N.30 Bongawan, N.31 Membakut, N.32 Klias, N.35 Sindumin, N.37 Karanaan, N.38 Paginatan, N.40 Bingkor, N.42 Melalap, N.43 Kemabong, N.44 Tulid, N.48 Sugut, N.50 Gum-Gum, N.53 Sekong, N.55 Elopura, N.57 Kuamut, N.61 Segama, N.62 Silam, N.64 Sulabayan, N.67 Balung, N.69 Sri Tanjong, N.70 Kukusan.)
Perikatan Nasional (PN)	Parti Pribumi Bersatu Malaysia (BERSATU)	31 (Note: Seats are N.01 Banggi, N.02 Bengkoka, N.04 Tanjong Kapor, N.08 Pintasan, N.12 Sulaman, N.13 Pantai Dalit, N.17 Darau, N.22 Tanjung Aru, N.24 Tanjung Keramat, N.26 Moyog, N.27 Limbahau, N.29 Pantai Manis, N.30 Bongawan, N.32 Klias, N.35 Sindumin, N.36 Kundasang, N.41 Liawan, N.46 Nabawan, N.47 Telupid, N.51 Sungai Manila, N.52 Sungai Sibuga, N.53 Sekong, N.58 Lamag, N.59 Sukau, N.62 Silam, N.63 Kunak, N.64 Sulabayan, N.66 Bugaya, N.68 Apas, N.70 Kukusan, N.73 Sebatik.)
Perikatan Nasional (PN)	Parti Gerakan Rakyat Malaysia (GERAKAN)	3 (Note: Seats are N.21 Luyang, N.55 Elopura, N.56 Tanjong Papat.)
Perikatan Nasional (PN)	Parti Islam Se-Malaysia (PAS)	2 (Note: Seats are N.23 Petagas, N.72 Merotai.)
Perikatan Nasional (PN)	Total	36
Homeland Solidarity Party (STAR)		36 (Note: Seats are N.01 Banggi, N.04 Tanjong Kapor, N.06 Bandau, N.08 Pintasan, N.09 Tempasuk, N.10 Usukan, N.11 Kadamaian, N.13 Pantai Dalit, N.14 Tamparuli, N.16 Karambunai, N.20 Api-Api, N.22 Tanjung Aru, N.23 Petagas, N.24 Tanjung Keramat, N.25 Kapayan, N.26 Moyog, N.28 Kawang, N.29 Pantai Manis, N.30 Bongawan, N.31 Membakut, N.33 Kuala Penyu, N.34 Lumadan, N.35 Sindumin, N.38 Paginatan, N.42 Melalap, N.43 Kemabong, N.45 Sook, N.46 Nabawan, N.47 Telupid, N.57 Kuamut, N.64 Sulabayan, N.66 Bugaya, N.67 Balung, N.69 Sri Tanjong, N.70 Kukusan, N.73 Sebatik.)
Parti Kesejahteraan Demokratik Masyarakat (KDM)		30 (Note: Seats are N.03 Pitas, N.08 Pintasan, N.09 Tempasuk, N.11 Kadamaian, N.13 Pantai Dalit, N.14 Tamparuli, N.15 Kiulu, N.17 Darau, N.18 Inanam, N.23 Petagas, N.24 Tanjung Keramat, N.25 Kapayan, N.26 Moyog, N.27 Limbahau, N.29 Pantai Manis, N.30 Bongawan, N.32 Klias, N.34 Lumadan, N.35 Sindumin, N.37 Karanaan, N.39 Tambunan, N.40 Bingkor, N.41 Liawan, N.43 Kemabong, N.44 Tulid, N.47 Telupid, N.49 Labuk, N.54 Karamunting, N.57 Kuamut, N.69 Sri Tanjong.)
Sabah Heritage Party (WARISAN)		23 (Note: Seats are N.02 Bengkoka, N.05 Matunggong, N.06 Bandau, N.07 Tandek, N.08 Pintasan, N.11 Kadamaian, N.12 Sulaman, N.14 Tamparuli, N.15 Kiulu, N.33 Kuala Penyu, N.36 Kundasang, N.37 Karanaan, N.38 Paginatan, N.39 Tambunan, N.40 Bingkor, N.42 Melalap, N.43 Kemabong, N.44 Tulid, N.45 Sook, N.46 Nabawan, N.47 Telupid, N.48 Sugut, N.58 Lamag.)
Parti Kebangsaan Sabah (PKS)		20 (Note: Seats are N.01 Banggi, N.05 Matunggong, N.06 Bandau, N.07 Tandek, N.09 Tempasuk, N.15 Kiulu, N.16 Karambunai, N.19 Likas, N.26 Moyog, N.31 Membakut, N.32 Klias, N.33 Kuala Penyu, N.35 Sindumin, N.40 Bingkor, N.44 Tulid, N.46 Nabawan, N.56 Tanjong Papat, N.59 Sukau, N.60 Tungku, N.62 Silam.)
Parti Kerjasama Anak Negeri (Anak Negeri)		17 (Note: Seats are N.01 Banggi, N.04 Tanjong Kapor, N.11 Kadamaian, N.14 Tamparuli, N.15 Kiulu, N.18 Inanam, N.23 Petagas, N.24 Tanjung Keramat, N.25 Kapayan, N.31 Membakut, N.36 Kundasang, N.38 Paginatan, N.39 Tambunan, N.49 Labuk, N.64 Sulabayan, N.70 Kukusan, N.73 Sebatik.)
Parti Perpaduan Rakyat Sabah (PPRS)		16 (Note: Seats are N.30 Bongawan, N.31 Membakut, N.32 Klias, N.41 Liawan, N.43 Kemabong, N.48 Sugut, N.51 Sungai Manila, N.55 Elopura, N.57 Kuamut, N.60 Tungku, N.63 Kunak, N.64 Sulabayan, N.67 Balung, N.68 Apas, N.70 Kukusan, N.73 Sebatik.)
Pertubuhan Kinabalu Progresif Bersatu (UPKO)		15 (Note: Seats are N.02 Bengkoka, N.06 Bandau, N.07 Tandek, N.18 Inanam, N.22 Tanjung Aru, N.23 Petagas, N.24 Tanjung Keramat, N.25 Kapayan, N.36 Kundasang, N.37 Karanaan, N.41 Liawan, N.42 Melalap, N.44 Tulid, N.46 Nabawan, N.49 Labuk.)
Parti Bumi Kenyalang (PBK)		14 (Note: Seats are N.01 Banggi, N.02 Bengkoka, N.04 Tanjong Kapor, N.06 Bandau, N.07 Tandek, N.16 Karambunai, N.18 Inanam, N.19 Likas, N.20 Api-Api, N.22 Tanjung Aru, N.24 Tanjung Keramat, N.25 Kapayan, N.26 Moyog, N.67 Balung.)
Barisan Nasional (BN)	United Malays National Organisation (UMNO)	10 (Note: Seats are N.01 Banggi, N.03 Pitas, N.06 Bandau, N.08 Pintasan, N.12 Sulaman, N.17 Darau, N.48 Sugut, N.62 Silam, N.66 Bugaya, N.68 Apas.)
Barisan Nasional (BN)	Malaysian Chinese Association (MCA)	1 (Note: N.04 Tanjong Kapor)
Barisan Nasional (BN)	Sabah United People's Party (PBRS)	1 (Note: N.36 Kundasang)
Barisan Nasional (BN)	Total	12
Parti Rumpun Sabah (RUMPUN)		7 (Note: Seats are N.14 Tamparuli, N.18 Inanam, N.41 Liawan, N.44 Tulid, N.66 Bugaya, N.67 Balung, N.73 Sebatik.)
Perjuangan Rakyat (PR)		6 (Note: Seats are N.18 Inanam, N.25 Kapayan, N.38 Paginatan, N.56 Tanjong Papat, N.59 Sukau, N.66 Bugaya.)
Parti Damai Sabah (SPP)		5 (Note: Seats are N.04 Tanjong Kapor, N.16 Karambunai, N.39 Tambunan, N.40 Bingkor, N.62 Silam.)
Sabah Progressive Party (SAPP)		5 (Note: Seats are N.19 Likas, N.21 Luyang, N.27 Limbahau, N.36 Kundasang, N.56 Tanjong Papat.)
Parti Aspirasi Rakyat Sarawak (ASPIRASI)		3 (Note: Seats are N.06 Bandau, N.25 Kapayan, N.66 Bugaya.)
Parti Bangsa Malaysia (PBM)		3 (Note: Seats are N.11 Kadamaian, N.38 Paginatan, N.47 Telupid.)
Pertubuhan Gemilang Anak Sabah (GAS)		3 (Note: Seats are N.16 Karambunai, N.18 Inanam, N.40 Bingkor.)
Pakatan Harapan (PH)	People's Justice Party (PKR)	2 (Note: Seats are N.26 Moyog, N.62 Silam.)
Gabungan Rakyat Sabah (GRS)	Parti Bersatu Sabah (PBS)	1 (Note: N.26 Moyog)
Gabungan Rakyat Sabah (GRS)	United Sabah National Organisation (USNO)	1 (Note: N.53 Sekong)
Gabungan Rakyat Sabah (GRS)	Total	2
Pertubuhan Perpaduan Rakyat Kebangsaaan Sabah (PERPADUAN)		1 (Note: N.16 Karambunai)
Parti Bersatu Sasa Malaysia (MUPP)		1 (Note: N.65 Senallang)
Total		389

=== Flipped seats ===
No.	Seat	Previous Party (2020)	Current Party (2025)
N01	Banggi	WARISAN	GRS (GAGASAN)
N03	Pitas	Independent	GRS (GAGASAN)
N04	Tanjong Kapor	WARISAN	GRS (GAGASAN)
N05	Matunggong	PBS	GRS (PBS)
N06	Bandau	PN (BERSATU)	Independent
N07	Tandek	PBS	GRS (PBS)
N08	Pintasan	PN (BERSATU)	Independent
N09	Tempasuk	BN (UMNO)	GRS (GAGASAN)
N10	Usukan	BN (UMNO)	WARISAN
N12	Sulaman	PN (BERSATU)	GRS (GAGASAN)
N13	Pantai Dalit	BN (UMNO)	GRS (GAGASAN)
N14	Tamparuli	PBS	UPKO
N15	Kiulu	PBS	GRS (PBS)
N16	Karambunai	BN (UMNO)	PN (PAS)
N18	Inanam	PH (PKR)	WARISAN
N19	Likas	PH (DAP)	WARISAN
N20	Api-Api	PH (PKR)	WARISAN
N21	Luyang	PH (DAP)	WARISAN
N23	Petagas	WARISAN	Independent
N24	Tanjung Keramat	BN (UMNO)	GRS (GAGASAN)
N25	Kapayan	PH (DAP)	WARISAN
N26	Moyog	WARISAN	UPKO
N27	Limbahau	WARISAN	GRS (PBS)
N28	Kawang	PN (BERSATU)	GRS (GAGASAN)
N29	Pantai Manis	BN (UMNO)	GRS (GAGASAN)
N31	Membakut	PN (BERSATU)	GRS (GAGASAN)
N32	Klias	PN (BERSATU)	GRS (GAGASAN)
N33	Kuala Penyu	PN (BERSATU)	GRS (GAGASAN)
N34	Lumadan	PBS	GRS (PBS)
N36	Kundasang	PBS	GRS (PBS)
N37	Karanaan	PN (BERSATU)	GRS (GAGASAN)
N38	Paginatan	PN (STAR)	KDM
N39	Tambunan	PN (STAR)	STAR
N40	Bingkor	PN (STAR)	STAR
N41	Liawan	PN (STAR)	BN (UMNO)
N42	Melalap	WARISAN	PH (PKR)
N43	Kemabong	Independent	GRS (GAGASAN)
N44	Tulid	PN (STAR)	Independent
N45	Sook	PN (STAR)	BN (PBRS)
N46	Nabawan	PN (BERSATU)	GRS (GAGASAN)
N47	Telupid	PBS	GRS (PBS)
N48	Sugut	BN (UMNO)	GRS (GAGASAN)
N49	Labuk	PN (BERSATU)	GRS (GAGASAN)
N51	Sungai Manila	BN (UMNO)	GRS (GAGASAN)
N52	Sungai Sibuga	BN (UMNO)	WARISAN
N55	Elopura	PH (DAP)	WARISAN
N56	Tanjong Papat	PH (DAP)	WARISAN
N57	Kuamut	Independent	GRS (GAGASAN)
N63	Kunak	WARISAN	BN (UMNO)
N67	Balung	BN (UMNO)	GRS (GAGASAN)
N68	Apas	PN (BERSATU)	GRS (GAGASAN)
N69	Sri Tanjong	PH (DAP)	WARISAN
N70	Kukusan	WARISAN	Independent
N71	Tanjong Batu	BN (UMNO)	GRS (GAGASAN)

==== Post-election pendulum ====
Pre-election pendulum

GOVERNMENT SEATS
Seat	Member	Party	Margin
Marginal
Bengkoka	Harun Durabi	UMNO	31.98
Pintasan	Fairuz Renddan	BERSATU	33.31
Kundasang	Dr. Joachim Gunsalam	PBS	43.35
Tulid	Flovia Ng	STAR	33.45
Lumadan	Ruslan Muharam	PBS	34.55
Paginatan	Abidin Madingkir	STAR	35.65
Tandek	Hendrus Anding	PBS	36.87
Kemabong	Rubin Balang	IND	38.48
Matunggong	Julita Majungki	PBS	39.09
Kuamut	Masiung Banah	IND	39.11
Liawan	Annuar Ayub Aman	STAR	39.12
Pitas	Ruddy Awah	IND	40.14
Telupid	Johnnybone J. Kurum	PBS	42.29
Karambunai	Yakubah Khan	UMNO	42.86
Balung	Hamid Awang	UMNO	44.51
Tempasuk	Mohd. Arsad Bistari	UMNO	45.35
Labuk	Samad Jambri	BERSATU	46.11
Sook	Ellron Alfred Angin	STAR	46.71
Pantai Manis	Tamin @ Mohd. Tamin Zainal	UMNO	49.56
Kuala Penyu	Limus Jury	BERSATU	49.56
Tanjung Keramat	Shahelmey Yahya	UMNO	51.75
Kiulu	Joniston Lumai @ Bangkuai	PBS	51.93
Sungai Sibuga	Mohamad Hamsan Awang Supian	UMNO	52.70
Lamag	Bung Moktar Radin	UMNO	54.06
Sungai Manila	Mokran Ingkat	UMNO	55.61
Sukau	Jafry Ariffin	UMNO	55.67
Nabawan	Abdul Ghani Mohamed Yassin	BERSATU	55.94
Fairly safe
Sugut	James Ratib	UMNO	57.88
Apas	Nizam Abu Bakar Titingan	BERSATU	58.30
Tamparuli	Jahid Jahim	PBS	59.26
Klias	Isnin Aliasnih	BERSATU	59.90
Safe
Bandau	Mohd. Fikri Bahanda	BERSATU	60.41
Membakut	Mohd. Arifin Mohd. Arif	BERSATU	60.70
Tanjung Batu	Andi Muhammad Suryady Bandy	UMNO	62.08
Pantai Dalit	Jasnih Daya	UMNO	62.73
Usukan	Salleh Said Keruak	UMNO	65.28
Sulaman	Hajiji Mohd. Noor	BERSATU	65.83
Bingkor	Robert Tawik @ Nordin	STAR	67.04
Kawang	Ghulamhaidar Khan Bahadar	BERSATU	71.24
Karanaan	Masidi Manjun	BERSATU	73.70
Tambunan	Dr. Jeffrey G. Kitingan	STAR	75.21

NON-GOVERNMENT SEATS
Seat	Member	Party	Margin
Marginal
Gum-Gum	Arunarsin Taib	WARISAN	39.21
Bongawan	Daud Yusof	WARISAN	42.26
Kukusan	Rina Jainal	WARISAN	42.53
Sebatik	Hassan A. Gani Pg. Amir	WARISAN	44.58
Petagas	Awang Ahmad Sah Awang Sahari	WARISAN	45.49
Banggi	Mohammad Mohamarin	WARISAN	45.89
Merotai	Sarifuddin Hata	WARISAN	47.83
Kunak	Norazlinah Arif	WARISAN	48.65
Darau	Azhar Matussin	WARISAN	48.67
Sindumin	Dr. Yusof Yacob	WARISAN	48.96
Tungku	Assaffal P. Alian	WARISAN	49.15
Tanjong Kapor	Ben Chong Chen Bin	WARISAN	49.84
Melalap	Peter Anthony	WARISAN	50.18
Inanam	Peto Galim	PKR	50.92
Kadamaian	Ewon Benedick	UPKO	51.07
Segama	Mohamaddin Ketapi	WARISAN	52.41
Sekong	Alias Sani	WARISAN	55.07
Silam	Dumi Pg. Masdal	WARISAN	55.40
Fairly safe
Limbahau	Juil Nuatim	WARISAN	57.12
Karamunting	George Hiew Vun Zin	WARISAN	58.76
Safe
Tanjong Aru	Junz Wong Hong Jun	WARISAN	60.34
Moyog	Ignatius Darell Leiking	WARISAN	62.83
Api-Api	Christina Liew Chin Jin	PKR	67.80
Tanjong Papat	Frankie Poon Ming Fung	DAP	68.00
Sulabayan	Jaujan Sambakong	WARISAN	69.04
Elopura	Calvin Chong Ket Kiun	DAP	73.61
Bugaya	Manis Muka Mohd. Darah	WARISAN	74.44
Sri Tanjong	Justin Wong Yung Bin	DAP	76.58
Senallang	Mohd. Shafie Apdal	WARISAN	77.16
Kapayan	Jannie Lasimbang	DAP	77.40
Likas	Tan Lee Fatt	DAP	86.33
Luyang	Phoong Jin Zhe	DAP	90.56

Post-election pendulum

GOVERNMENT SEATS
Seat	Member	Party	Margin
Marginal
Bengkoka	Harun Durabi	UMNO	20.96
Bandau	Maijol Mahap	IND	22.78
Karambunai	Aliakbar Gulasan	PAS	27.47
Liawan	Nik Mohd Nadzri Nik Zawawi	UMNO	28.33
Kundasang	Joachim Gunsalam	PBS	28.97
Tanjong Kapor	Ben Chong Chen Bin	GAGASAN	30.19
Tulid	Jordan Jude Ellron	IND	30.51
Kukusan	Rina Jainal	IND	31.56
Labuk	Samad Jambri	GAGASAN	31.70
Petagas	Awang Ahamd Sah Awang Sahari	IND	31.89
Paginatan	Rusdin Riman	KDM	32.64
Tanjung Keramat	Shah Alfie Yahya	GAGASAN	33.15
Melalap	Jamawi Ja'afar	PKR	33.80
Tanjung Batu	Andi Md Shamsureezal	GAGASAN	34.77
Balung	Syed Ahmad Syed Abas	GAGASAN	35.86
Kiulu	Joniston Bangkuai	PBS	36.51
Nabawan	Abdul Ghani Mohamed Yassin	GAGASAN	37.08
Telupid	Jonnybone J Kurum	PBS	37.61
Sungai Manila	Hazeem Mubarak Musa	GAGASAN	37.89
Lamag	Bung Moktar Radin	UMNO	39.14
Pintasan	Fairuz Renddan	IND	39.32
Kemabong	Rubin Balang	GAGASAN	39.77
Tempasuk	Mohd Arsad Bistari	GAGASAN	39.79
Membakut	Mohd Arifin Mohd Arif	GAGASAN	39.95
Klias	Isnin Aliasnih	GAGASAN	40.01
Kuamut	Masiung Banah	GAGASAN	40.06
Kunak	Anil Jeet Singh	UMNO	41.49
Moyog	Donald Peter Mojuntin	UPKO	43.03
Tandek	Hendrus Anding	PBS	43.14
Limbahau	Juil Nuatim	PBS	43.36
Pantai Dalit	Jasnih Daya	GAGASAN	44.62
Banggi	Mohamamd Mohamarin	GAGASAN	44.81
Tamparuli	Wilfred Madius Tangau	UPKO	44.86
Pantai Manis	Pg Saifuddin Pg Tahir Petra	GAGASAN	45.50
Sukau	Jafry Ariffin	UMNO	45.68
Bingkor	Mohd Ishak Ayub	STAR	47.07
Matunggong	Julita Majungki	PBS	47.25
Pitas	Ruddy Awah	GAGASAN	47.57
Apas	Nizam Abu Bakar Titingan	GAGASAN	49.66
Sugut	James Ratib	GAGASAN	50.00
Lumadan	Ruslan Muharam	PBS	52.72
Kuala Penyu	Limus Jury	GAGASAN	53.52
Karanaan	Masidi Manjun	GAGASAN	54.63
Fairly safe
Sook	Arthur Joseph Kurup	PBRS	57.90
Safe
Kadamaian	Ewon Benedick	UPKO	65.60
Tambunan	Jeffrey Kitingan	STAR	65.79
Kawang	Ghulamhaidar Khan	GAGASAN	65.96
Sulaman	Hajiji Noor	GAGASAN	73.63

NON-GOVERNMENT SEATS
Seat	Member	Party	Margin
Marginal
Gum-Gum	Arunarsin Taib	WARISAN	26.20
Sebatik	Manahing Tinggilani	WARISAN	27.03
Sungai Sibuga	Nurulalsah Hassan Alban	WARISAN	30.24
Bongawan	Daud Yusof	WARISAN	30.70
Sindumin	Yusri Pungut	WARISAN	32.10
Inanam	Edna Jessica Majimbun	WARISAN	33.49
Tanjong Papat	Alex Thien Ching Qiang	WARISAN	35.14
Usukan	Isnaraissah Munirah Majilis	WARISAN	35.65
Tungku	Assaffal P Alian	WARISAN	37.56
Karamunting	Alex Wong Tshun Khee	WARISAN	37.79
Darau	Azhar Matussin	WARISAN	39.94
Sekong	Alias Sani	WARISAN	40.27
Segama	Muhamamd Abdul Karim	WARISAN	42.61
Silam	Yusof Apdal	WARISAN	43.48
Elopura	Calvin Chong Ket Kiun	WARISAN	45.07
Tanjoung Aru	Junz Wong Hong Jun	WARISAN	47.68
Kapayan	Chin Tek Ming	WARISAN	50.44
Sri Tanjong	Justin Wong Yung Bin	WARISAN	52.59
Fairly safe
Likas	Tham Yun Fook	WARISAN	56.31
Merotai	Sarifuddin Hata	WARISAN	58.21
Api-Api	Loi Kok Liang	WARISAN	59.84
Safe
Luyang	Samuel Wong Tshun Chuen	WARISAN	61.23
Bugaya	Jamil Hamzah	WARISAN	67.62
Sulabayan	Jaujan Sambakong	WARISAN	74.40
Senallang	Shafie Apdal	WARISAN	79.61

== Aftermath ==
Shortly after the election results were confirmed, Hajiji was sworn in as chief minister for a second term. While his coalition only won 29 seats in a hung assembly, he reportedly received the support of a number of other parties to form a government. These included Barisan Nasional, UPKO, STAR, Pakatan Harapan, KDM, as well as five independent assemblymen.

The state cabinet unveiled following Hajiji's swearing in included members of, besides his own coalition, Barisan Nasional (UMNO), UPKO, and Pakatan Harapan. The inclusion of Barisan Nasional in government generated some controversy and pushback in some quarters, including Hajiji's own party's youth wing and a number of GRS assemblymen.

Following its exclusion from government, STAR entered into opposition and reiterated its stance that the state government should only comprise local parties. Nevertheless, one of its two assemblymen was later appointed an assistant minister in a personal capacity.

State opposition and Warisan leader Shafie Apdal criticised the employment of state machinery by the federal and state government as well as the "rampant money politics" during the election, pointing out that his party had nevertheless won the popular vote.

Despite the poor performance of Barisan Nasional as a whole, with UMNO losing six seats, coalition member United Sabah People's Party managed to regain representation in the assembly. Bung Moktar Radin, Sabah BN chairman and assemblyman-elect for Lamag, died on 5 December 2025, just six days after the election ended.

Pakatan Harapan had a poor showing, winning only one seat. Coalition member Democratic Action Party (DAP) lost in all eight constituencies it contested, including six it had held going into the election. The six seats were won by Warisan, including three the DAP had won in 2013 and were considered strongholds. As the party mainly relies on the vote of urban and semi-urban Chinese, the swing against it has been described as a "Chinese tsunami".
