= Sabah National People's Unity Organisation =

Sabah National People's Unity Organisation Pertubuhan Perpaduan Rakyat Kebangsaan Sabah PERPADUAN
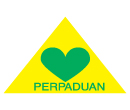
- Abbreviation: PERPADUAN
- Leader: Jack Giau
- Founded: 28 August 2013
- Ideology: Nationalism; Regionalism
- National affiliation: Barisan Nasional (allies until 2019)
- Colours: Green and yellow

Party flag

Website
- Pertubuhan Perpaduan Rakyat Kebangsaan Sabah (PERPADUAN) Facebook

Sabah National People's Unity Organisation or Malay: Pertubuhan Perpaduan Rakyat Kebangsaan Sabah (PERPADUAN) is a Sabah-based-opposition party in Malaysia formed after the 2013 Malaysian general election. Following its establishment, the party expresses support for Barisan Nasional (BN) from time to time until 2019. It was also a component of the planned Gabungan Rakyat Saksama (SAKSAMA) coalition.

== Election results ==
Sabah State Legislative Assembly
Election	Votes		Seats			Position	Status
Election	Count	%	Result	Won / contested	+/–	Position	Status
2018	Did not contest						No seats
2020	Did not contest						No seats
2025	73	0.0	0 / 73	0 / 1	Steady	22nd	No seats

== See also ==
- Politics of Malaysia
- List of political parties in Malaysia
