= George Hiew Vun Zin =

Malaysian politician

Yang Berbahagia Datuk George Hiew Vun Zin PGDK ASDK
- 邱文正

State Assistant Minister of Housing and Local Government of Sabah
- In office 16 May 2018 – 29 September 2020
- Minister: Jaujan Sambakong
- Governor: Juhar Mahiruddin
- Chief Minister: Shafie Apdal
- Preceded by: Joachim Gunsalam
- Succeeded by: Isnin Aliasnih; Mohamad Hamsan Awang Supian
- Constituency: Karamunting

Divisional Chairperson of Gagasan Rakyat
- Incumbent
- Assumed office 20 March 2023
- President of GAGASAN: Hajiji Noor
- Preceded by: Position established
- Constituency: Karamunting (state constituency division leader)

Member of the Sabah State Legislative Assembly for Karamunting
- In office 9 May 2018 – 29 November 2025
- Preceded by: Charles O Pang Su Sin (BN–LDP)
- Succeeded by: Alex Wong Tshun Kee (WARISAN)
- Majority: 3,848 (2018); 2,479 (2020)

Faction represented in Sabah State Legislative Assembly
- 2018–2023: Sabah Heritage Party
- 2023–2025: Gabungan Rakyat Sabah

Personal details
- Born: George Hiew Vun Zin; 1979 (age 46–47) Sandakan, Sabah, Malaysia
- Citizenship: Malaysian
- Party: Democratic Action Party (DAP) (2013–2016); Sabah Heritage Party (WARISAN) (2016–2023); Parti Gagasan Rakyat Sabah (GAGASAN) (2023–2025; since 2026); People's Justice Party (PKR) (2025–2026)
- Other political affiliations: Pakatan Rakyat (PR) (2013–2015); Pakatan Harapan (PH) (2015–2016; 2025–2026); Gabungan Rakyat Sabah (GRS) (2023–2025; since 2026)
- Spouse: Tracy Kong Sim Yee
- Occupation: Politician

George Hiew Vun Zin (Chinese: 邱文正; pinyin: Qīu Wénzhèng; pinfa: Hiu^{1} Vun^{2} Zen^{4}; born 1979) is a Malaysian politician who has served as the Member of Sabah State Legislative Assembly (MLA) for Karamunting since May 2018. He served as the State Assistant Minister of Housing and Local Government of Sabah in the Heritage Party (WARISAN) administration under former Chief Minister Shafie Apdal and former Minister Jaujan Sambakong from May 2018 to the collapse of the WARISAN administration in September 2020. He is a member of the Parti Gagasan Rakyat Sabah (GAGASAN), a component party of the Gabungan Rakyat Sabah (GRS) coalition and was a former member of WARISAN as well as the Democratic Action Party (DAP), a component party of the Pakatan Harapan (PH) and formerly the Pakatan Rakyat (PR) coalitions. He was also a former Member of the Supreme Council and Division Chief of Sandakan of WARISAN. In 2016, he left DAP for WARISAN and on 4 March 2023, he left WARISAN for GAGASAN to support a local party after WARISAN declared to become a national party. He became a divisional chairperson of Karamunting of Gagasan Rakyat in 2023, and also become one of the GRS main leaders in Sandakan.

== Election results ==
Sabah State Legislative Assembly
Year	Constituency	Candidate	Votes	Pct	Opponent(s)	Votes	Pct	Ballots cast	Majority	Turnout
2013	N45 Elopura	George Hiew Vun Zin (DAP)	7,854	47.81%	Au Kam Wah (Gerakan)	8,105	49.34%	16,709	251	74.90%
2013	N45 Elopura	George Hiew Vun Zin (DAP)	7,854	47.81%	Liau Fook Kong (SAPP)	469	2.85%	16,709	251	74.90%
2018	N44 Karamunting	George Hiew Vun Zin (WARISAN)	7,243	63.67%	Lim Kai Min (LDP)	3,395	29.84%	11,724	3,848	73.00%
2018	N44 Karamunting	George Hiew Vun Zin (WARISAN)	7,243	63.67%	Norsah Bongsu (PAS)	677	5.95%	11,724	3,848	73.00%
2018	N44 Karamunting	George Hiew Vun Zin (WARISAN)	7,243	63.67%	Besarun Kecha (STAR)	61	0.54%	11,724	3,848	73.00%
2020	N54 Karamunting	George Hiew Vun Zin (WARISAN)	5,694	58.76%	Chew Kok Woh (MCA)	3,215	33.17%	9,690	2,479	60.96%
2020	N54 Karamunting	George Hiew Vun Zin (WARISAN)	5,694	58.76%	Adam Rachel Singh Chal (USNO Baru)	306	3.16%	9,690	2,479	60.96%
2020	N54 Karamunting	George Hiew Vun Zin (WARISAN)	5,694	58.76%	Kong Nyuk Thou (PBS)	235	2.43%	9,690	2,479	60.96%
2020	N54 Karamunting	George Hiew Vun Zin (WARISAN)	5,694	58.76%	Ha Cheun Hoo (LDP)	129	1.33%	9,690	2,479	60.96%
2020	N54 Karamunting	George Hiew Vun Zin (WARISAN)	5,694	58.76%	Loo Mun Yew (PCS)	81	0.84%	9,690	2,479	60.96%
2020	N54 Karamunting	George Hiew Vun Zin (WARISAN)	5,694	58.76%	Lee Tiang Yong (PPRS)	30	0.31%	9,690	2,479	60.96%
2025	N54 Karamunting	George Hiew Vun Zin (PKR)	3,635	31.86%	Alex Wong Tshun Khee (WARISAN)	4,311	37.79%	11,408	676	59.91%
2025	N54 Karamunting	George Hiew Vun Zin (PKR)	3,635	31.86%	Chin Kim Hung (MCA)	2,297	20.13%	11,408	676	59.91%
2025	N54 Karamunting	George Hiew Vun Zin (PKR)	3,635	31.86%	Chew Kok Woh (KDM)	948	8.31%	11,408	676	59.91%
2025	N54 Karamunting	George Hiew Vun Zin (PKR)	3,635	31.86%	Soo Ming Soon (IMPIAN)	217	1.90%	11,408	676	59.91%

== Honours ==
- Sabah
  - Commander of the Order of Kinabalu (PGDK) – Datuk (2023)
  - Companion of the Order of Kinabalu (ASDK) (2018)
