= Mokran Ingkat =

Malaysian politician

Yang Berbahagia Datuk Mokran Ingkat PGDK
- مقران إيڠكت

Member of the Sabah State Legislative Assembly for Sungai Manila
- In office 26 September 2020 – 1 December 2025
- Preceded by: constituency established
- Majority: 1,417 (2020)

Personal details
- Born: 10 July 1966 (age 59) Sandakan, Sabah, Malaysia
- Party: United Malays National Organisation (UMNO)
- Other political affiliations: Barisan Nasional (BN)
- Occupation: Politician
- Profession: Forest ranger (retired)

Mokran bin Ingkat (born 10 July 1966) is a Malaysian politician who served as the Member of the Sabah State Legislative Assembly (MLA) for Sungai Manila from 2020 to 2025. He is a member of United Malays National Organisation (UMNO), a component party of Barisan Nasional (BN) coalition.

== Election results ==
Sabah State Legislative Assembly
Year	Constituency	Candidate	Votes	Pct	Opponent(s)	Votes	Pct	Ballots cast	Majority	Turnout
2020	N51 Sungai Manila	Mokran Ingkat (UMNO)	4,585	53.91%	Mahmud Sudin (WARISAN)	3,168	37.25%	8,505	1,417	66.65%
2020	N51 Sungai Manila	Mokran Ingkat (UMNO)	4,585	53.91%	K Zulkipli Harrith (USNO Baru)	111	1.31%	8,505	1,417	66.65%
2020	N51 Sungai Manila	Mokran Ingkat (UMNO)	4,585	53.91%	Mohd Anuar Ma Yusuf (LDP)	100	1.18%	8,505	1,417	66.65%
2020	N51 Sungai Manila	Mokran Ingkat (UMNO)	4,585	53.91%	Mohd Arshad Abdul (PPRS)	90	1.06%	8,505	1,417	66.65%

== Honours ==
- Sabah
  - Commander of the Order of Kinabalu (PGDK) – Datuk (2023)
  - Companion of the Order of Kinabalu (ASDK) (2007)
  - Member of the Order of Kinabalu (ADK) (2005)
  - Grand Star of the Order of Kinabalu (BSK) (2003)
