= Tulid =

Malaysian state constituency

Tulid (N44)
Sabah constituency

State constituency
- Legislature: Sabah State Legislative Assembly
MLA
Jordan Jude
Independent
- Constituency created: 2019
- First contested: 2020
- Last contested: 2025

Demographics
- Electors (2025): 16,551

Tulid is a state constituency in Sabah, Malaysia, that is represented in the Sabah State Legislative Assembly. This is one of the thirteen new state constituencies as result of approval from state legislative and Dewan Rakyat on 17 July 2019, being contested for the first time as part of the 2020 snap election

== Demographics ==
As of 2020, Tulid has a population of 19,915 people.

Ethnic breakdown of Tulid's electorate as of 2025
1. Non-Muslim Bumiputera (71.7%)
2. Muslim Bumiputera (28.0%)
3. Chinese (0.30%)
4. Other ethnicities (0.00%)

== History ==
=== Polling districts ===
According to the gazette issued on 31 October 2022, the Tulid constituency has a total of 9 polling districts.

State constituency	Polling Districts	Code	Location
Tulid（N44）	Sinulihan	182/44/01	SK Kabatang Baru
Tulid（N44）	Mansiat	182/44/02	SK Mansiat
Tulid（N44）	Tulid	182/44/03	SMK Tulid
Tulid（N44）	Sungoi	182/44/04	SK Kapayan Baru
Tulid（N44）	Marapok	182/44/05	SK Ambual; SK Sodomon
Tulid（N44）	Magatang	182/44/06	SK Magatang; SK Pengagtan
Tulid（N44）	Menawo	182/44/07	SK Menawo
Tulid（N44）	Simbuan	182/44/08	SK Simbuan Tulid
Tulid（N44）	Lanas	182/44/09	SK Lanas

=== Representation history ===
Members of the Legislative Assembly for Tulid
Assembly	No	Years	Member	Party
Constituency created from Sook, Kuamut and Bingkor
16th	N44	2022–2025	Flovia Ng	GRS (STAR)
16th	N44	2025	Flovia Ng	STAR
17th	N44	2025–present	Jordan Jude	Independent

== Election results ==
Sabah state election, 2025: Tulid
Party	Candidate	Votes	%	∆%
Independent	Jordan Jude	3,545	30.51	▲30.51
Homeland Solidarity Party	Evaristus Gungkit	2,350	20.22	▲20.22
PH	Rufinah Pengeran	1,628	14.01	▲14.01
Independent	Edwin Laimin	1,236	10.64	▲10.64
Heritage	Lucia Kihing	855	7.36	▼15.68
Independent	Suman Yasambun	699	6.02	▲6.02
UPKO	Mohd Khairil Abdullah	555	4.78	▲4.78
KDM	Oswald Aisat Ellik Igau Iggau	416	3.58	▲3.58
Independent	Engah Sintan @ Dahlan Abdullah	100	0.86	▲0.86
Sabah Nationality Party	Vinson Rusikan	93	0.80	▲0.80
Sabah Dream Party	Anchis @ Rayner Francis Udog	69	0.59	▲0.59
Sabah Clan Party	Jufina Dimis	29	0.25	▲0.25
Independent	Clarence Carter Maraat	27	0.23	▲0.23
Independent	Lautis @ Laulis Anggang	18	0.15	▲0.15
Total valid votes		11,620		
Total rejected ballots		198		
Unreturned ballots		11		
Turnout		11,829	71.47	▼5.95
Registered electors		16,551		
Majority		1,195	10.29	▲2.41
Independent gain from PN		Swing		?
Source(s) "RESULTS OF CONTESTED ELECTION AND STATEMENTS OF THE POLL AFTER THE OFFICIAL ADDITION OF VOTES" (PDF).

Sabah state election, 2020: Tulid
Party	Candidate	Votes	%
PN	Flovia Ng	2,267	32.86
BN	Matusin Bowie	1,723	24.98
Sabah Heritage Party	Mudi Dubing	1,589	23.04
PBS	Suma Yasambun	720	10.44
Love Sabah Party	Matusin Timam	356	5.16
USNO (Baru)	Mohamad Khairy Abdullah	69	1.00
LDP	Dahalan @ Ulin Abdullah	52	0.75
Total valid votes		6,776	98.23
Total rejected ballots		106	1.54
Unreturned ballots		16	0.23
Turnout		6,898	77.42
Registered electors		8,910	
Majority		544	7.88
This was a new constituency created.
