= Karamunting =

State constituency in Sabah, Malaysia

Karamunting (N54)
Sabah constituency

State constituency
- Legislature: Sabah State Legislative Assembly
MLA
Alex Wong Tshun Khee
Heritage
- Constituency created: 1974
- First contested: 1976
- Last contested: 2025

Demographics
- Electors (2025): 19,615

Karamunting is a state constituency in Sabah, Malaysia, that is represented in the Sabah State Legislative Assembly.

== Demographics ==
As of 2020, Karamunting has a population of 31,152 people.

Ethnic breakdown of Karamunting's electorate as of 2025
1. Muslim Bumiputera (52.0%)
2. Chinese (36.0%)
3. Non-Muslim Bumiputera (12.0%)
4. Other ethnicities (0.00%)

== History ==
=== Polling districts ===
According to the gazette issued on 31 October 2022, the Karamunting constituency has a total of 6 polling districts.

State constituency	Polling District	Code	Location
Karamunting (N54)	Cecily	185/54/01	SJK (C) Yuk Choi
Karamunting (N54)	Tanah Merah	185/54/02	SJK (C) Sung Siew
Karamunting (N54)	Jalan Leila	185/54/03	Tadika Sung Siew
Karamunting (N54)	Kampung Gelam	185/54/04	Perpustakaan Wilayah Sandakan; SK Bandar Sandakan
Karamunting (N54)	Karamunting	185/54/05	SK Karamunting
Karamunting (N54)	Bokara	185/54/06	SK Sri Melanta Jaya

=== Representation history ===
Member of Sabah State Legislative Assembly for Karamunting
Assembly	No	Years	Member	Party
Constituency created from Elopura, Sandakan Bandar and Kuala Kinabatangan
5th	N27	1976	Lau Pui Keong (劉沛強)	BERJAYA
5th	N27	1976 – 1981	Lau Pui Keong (劉沛強)	BN (BERJAYA)
6th	N27	1981 – 1985	Lau Pui Keong (劉沛強)	BN (BERJAYA)
7th	N20	1985 – 1986	Lau Pui Keong (劉沛強)	BN (BERJAYA)
7th	N20	1986	Lau Pui Keong (劉沛強)	PBS
8th	N20	1986 – 1990	Lau Pui Keong (劉沛強)	PBS
9th	N20	1990 – 1994	Lau Pui Keong (劉沛強)	GR (PBS)
10th	N20	1994 – 1999	Lau Pui Keong (劉沛強)	GR (PBS)
11th	N38	1999 – 2004	Wong Lien Tat (黃元達)	BN (LDP)
12th	N44	2004 – 2008	Wong Lien Tat (黃元達)	BN (LDP)
13th	N44	2008 – 2010	Peter Pang En Yin (彭恩榮)	BN (LDP)
13th	N44	2010 – 2013	Peter Pang En Yin (彭恩榮)	BN (GERAKAN)
14th	N44	2013 – 2018	Charles O Pang Su Pin (彭思彬)	BN (LDP)
15th	N44	2018 – 2020	George Hiew Vun Zin (邱文正)	WARISAN
16th	N54	2020 – 2023	George Hiew Vun Zin (邱文正)	WARISAN
16th	N54	2023 – 2025	George Hiew Vun Zin (邱文正)	GRS (GAGASAN)
17th	N54	2025–present	Alex Wong Tshun Khee (黃俊奇)	WARISAN

== Election results ==
Sabah state election, 2025: Karamunting
Party	Candidate	Votes	%	∆%
Heritage	Alex Wong Tshun Khee	4,311	37.79	▼18.44
PH	George Hiew Vun Zin	3,635	31.86	▲31.86
BN	Chin Kim Hung	2,297	20.13	▼11.62
KDM	Chew Kok Woh	948	8.31	▲8.31
Sabah Dream Party	Soo Ming Soon	217	1.90	▲1.90
Total valid votes		11,408		
Total rejected ballots		270		
Unreturned ballots		74		
Turnout		11,752	59.91	▼3.80
Registered electors		19,615		
Majority		676	5.93	▼18.55
Heritage hold		Swing		

Sabah state election, 2020: Karamunting
Party	Candidate	Votes	%	∆%
Sabah Heritage Party	George Hiew Vun Zin	5,694	56.23	▼5.55
BN	Chew Kok Woh	3,215	31.75	▲2.79
USNO (Baru)	Adam Chal	306	3.02	▲3.02
PBS	Kong Nyuk Thou	235	2.32	▲2.32
LDP	Ha Cheun Hoo	129	1.27	▲1.27
Love Sabah Party	Loo Mun Yew	81	0.80	▲0.80
Sabah People's Unity Party	Lee Tiang Yong	30	0.30	▲0.30
Total valid votes		9,690	95.68	
Total rejected ballots		218	2.15	
Unreturned ballots		219	2.16	
Turnout		10,127	63.71	▼9.33
Registered electors		15,896		
Majority		2,479	24.48	▼8.34
Sabah Heritage Party hold		Swing		
Source(s) "RESULTS OF CONTESTED ELECTION AND STATEMENTS OF THE POLL AFTER THE OFFICIAL ADDITION OF VOTES". Archived from the original on 2022-09-28.

Sabah state election, 2018: Karamunting
Party	Candidate	Votes	%	∆%
Sabah Heritage Party	George Hiew Vun Zin	7,243	61.78	▲61.78
BN	Lim Kai Min	3,395	28.96	▼21.90
PAS	Norsah Bongsu	677	5.77	▲5.77
STAR	Besarun Kecha	61	0.52	▲0.52
Total valid votes		11,376	97.03	
Total rejected ballots		267	2.28	
Unreturned ballots		81	0.69	
Turnout		11,724	73.04	▼3.82
Registered electors		16,052		
Majority		3,848	32.82	▲25.84
Sabah Heritage Party gain from BN		Swing		?
Source(s) "RESULTS OF CONTESTED ELECTION AND STATEMENTS OF THE POLL AFTER THE OFFICIAL ADDITION OF VOTES". Archived from the original on 2022-09-28.

Sabah state election, 2013: Karamunting
Party	Candidate	Votes	%	∆%
BN	Charles O Pang Su Pin	6,235	50.86	▼3.50
DAP	Chong Ket Kiun	5,380	43.88	▲24.86
SAPP	Yong Vui Min	352	2.87	▲2.87
Total valid votes		11,967	97.61	
Total rejected ballots		278	2.27	
Unreturned ballots		15	0.12	
Turnout		12,260	76.86	▲12.13
Registered electors		15,952		
Majority		855	6.98	▼28.36
BN hold		Swing		
Source(s) "KEPUTUSAN PILIHAN RAYA UMUM DEWAN UNDANGAN NEGERI". Archived from the original on 2022-08-18.

Sabah state election, 2008: Karamunting
Party	Candidate	Votes	%	∆%
BN	Peter Pang En Yin	5,171	54.36	▼1.34
DAP	Chok Kon Tack	1,809	19.02	▲19.02
Independent	Sak Cheong Yu	1,455	15.29	▼22.25
PKR	Tan Shu Tee	452	4.75	▲0.13
Total valid votes		8,887	93.42	
Total rejected ballots		271	2.85	
Unreturned ballots		355	3.73	
Turnout		9,513	64.73	▲8.87
Registered electors		14,696		
Majority		3,362	35.34	▲17.18
BN hold		Swing		
Source(s) "KEPUTUSAN PILIHAN RAYA UMUM DEWAN UNDANGAN NEGERI SABAH BAGI TAHUN 2008".

Sabah state election, 2004: Karamunting
Party	Candidate	Votes	%	∆%
BN	Wong Lien Tat	4,843	55.70	▲9.47
Independent	Sak Cheong Yu	3,264	37.54	▲37.54
PKR	Chin Vui Keong	402	4.62	▲4.62
Total valid votes		8,509	97.86	
Total rejected ballots		186	2.14	
Unreturned ballots		0	0.00	
Turnout		8,695	55.86	▼14.02
Registered electors		15,566		
Majority		1,579	18.16	▲0.55
BN hold		Swing		
Source(s) "KEPUTUSAN PILIHAN RAYA UMUM DEWAN UNDANGAN NEGERI SABAH BAGI TAHUN 2004".

Sabah state election, 1999: Karamunting
Party	Candidate	Votes	%	∆%
BN	Wong Lien Tat	4,719	46.23	▼2.55
PBS	Thien Fui Yun	2,922	28.62	▼21.50
BERSEKUTU	Chung Kwong Wing	2,124	20.81	▲20.81
Independent	Lee Tze Ting	59	0.58	▲0.58
Total valid votes		9,824	96.24	
Total rejected ballots		168	1.65	
Unreturned ballots		216	2.12	
Turnout		10,208	69.88	▲0.99
Registered electors		14,608		
Majority		1,797	17.61	▲16.27
BN gain from PBS		Swing		?
Source(s) "KEPUTUSAN PILIHAN RAYA UMUM DEWAN UNDANGAN NEGERI SABAH BAGI TAHUN 1999".

Sabah state election, 1994: Karamunting
Party	Candidate	Votes	%	∆%
PBS	Lau Pui Keong	4,219	50.12	▼9.31
BN	Ng Ket Henn @ Wu Kuo Shiean	4,106	48.78	▲22.41
Total valid votes		8,325	98.91	
Total rejected ballots		92	1.09	
Unreturned ballots		0	0.00	
Turnout		8,417	68.89	▼4.28
Registered electors		12,218		
Majority		113	1.34	▼31.72
PBS hold		Swing		
Source(s) "KEPUTUSAN PILIHAN RAYA UMUM DEWAN UNDANGAN NEGERI SABAH BAGI TAHUN 1994".

Sabah state election, 1990: Karamunting
Party	Candidate	Votes	%	∆%
PBS	Lau Pui Keong	4,879	59.43	▼3.22
LDP	David Ngui Tet Shiung	2,165	26.37	▲26.37
DAP	Phang Yau Wing	692	8.43	▲8.43
BERJAYA	Wong Tien Fatt	424	5.17	▼8.15
Total valid votes		8,160	99.40	
Total rejected ballots		49	0.60	
Unreturned ballots		0	0.00	
Turnout		8,209	73.17	▲0.10
Registered electors		11,219		
Majority		2,714	33.06	▼5.83
PBS hold		Swing		
Source(s) "KEPUTUSAN PILIHAN RAYA UMUM DEWAN UNDANGAN NEGERI SABAH BAGI TAHUN 1990".

Sabah state election, 1986: Karamunting
Party	Candidate	Votes	%	∆%
PBS	Lau Pui Keong	4,752	62.65	
Independent	David Ngui Tet Shiung	1,802	23.76	
BERJAYA	Liaw Wah Fong @ William	1,010	13.32	
Total valid votes		7,564	99.72	
Total rejected ballots		21	0.28	
Unreturned ballots		0	0.00	
Turnout		7,585	73.07	
Registered electors		10,380		
Majority		2,950	38.89	
PBS hold		Swing		
Source(s) "KEPUTUSAN PILIHAN RAYA UMUM DEWAN UNDANGAN NEGERI SABAH BAGI TAHUN 1986".

Sabah state by-election, 25 January 1986: Karamunting Upon the resignation of incumbent, Lau Pui Keong
Party	Candidate	Votes	%	∆%
PBS	Lau Pui Keong	3,463		
BERJAYA				
USNO				
Total valid votes				
Total rejected ballots				
Unreturned ballots		0	0.00	
Turnout				
Registered electors				
Majority				
PBS gain from BERJAYA		Swing		?

Sabah state election, 1985: Karamunting
Party	Candidate	Votes	%	∆%
BERJAYA	Lau Pui Keong	2,812	39.16	▼31.70
PBS	Ngui Kon Foh @ David Ngui Tet Shiung	2,478	34.51	▲34.51
USNO	Abdullah Shaibal	1,245	17.34	▲17.34
DAP	Fung Thiam Fu	645	8.98	▲8.98
Total valid votes		7,180		
Total rejected ballots		96		
Unreturned ballots		0	0.00	
Turnout		7,276	74.18	▼6.26
Registered electors		9,809		
Majority		334	4.65	▼41.45
BERJAYA hold		Swing		
Source(s) "How they fared". New Straits Times. 1985-04-22.

Sabah state election, 1981: Karamunting
Party	Candidate	Votes	%	∆%
BERJAYA	Lau Pui Keong	4,613	70.86	▲3.49
SCCP	Tan Kun Boo	1,612	24.76	▲7.87
Independent	Ahamad Mohd Saffar	285	4.38	▲4.38
Total valid votes		6,253	100.00	
Total rejected ballots		58		
Unreturned ballots		0		
Turnout		6,311	73.26	▼2.62
Registered electors		8,615		
Majority		3,001	47.99	▲13.24
BERJAYA hold		Swing		
Source(s) "Sabah election: How they fared". New Straits Times. 1981-03-29.

Sabah state election, 1976: Karamunting
Party	Candidate	Votes	%
BERJAYA	Lau Pui Keong	3,616	67.37
SCA	Ngui Tet Yin	1,751	32.63
Total valid votes		5,367	100.00
Total rejected ballots		53	
Unreturned ballots		0	
Turnout		5,420	75.88
Registered electors		7,143	
Majority		1,865	34.75
This was a new seat created.
