= Sekong (state constituency) =

State constituency in Sabah, Malaysia

Sekong (N53)
Sabah constituency

State constituency
- Legislature: Sabah State Legislative Assembly
MLA
Alias Sani
Heritage
- Constituency created: 1974
- First contested: 1974
- Last contested: 2025

Demographics
- Electors (2025): 27,518

Sekong is a state constituency in Sabah, Malaysia, that is represented in the Sabah State Legislative Assembly.

== Demographics ==
As of 2020, Sekong has a population of 88,546 people.

Ethnic breakdown of Sekong's electorate as of 2025
1. Muslim Bumiputera (72.0%)
2. Chinese (18.0%)
3. Non-Muslim Bumiputera (10.0%)
4. Other ethnicities (0.00%)

== History ==
=== Polling districts ===
According to the gazette issued on 31 October 2022, the Sekong constituency has a total of 7 polling districts.

State constituency	Polling District	Code	Location
Sekong (N53)	Jalan Sibuga	185/53/01	SMA Tun Juhar; SK Mawar
Sekong (N53)	Kampung Gas	185/53/02	SK Gas; SK Bambangan
Sekong (N53)	Jalan Batu Sapi	185/53/03	SMK Batu Sapi
Sekong (N53)	Tronglit	185/53/04	SK Pulau Timbang
Sekong (N53)	Sekong	185/53/05	SK Segaliud
Sekong (N53)	Lupak Meluas	185/53/06	SK Kg Bahagia
Sekong (N53)	Pulau Sanghai	185/53/07	SK Pulau Sanghai

=== Representation history ===
Member of Sabah State Legislative Assembly for Sekong
Assembly	No	Years	Member	Party
Constituency created from Kuala Kinabatangan
5th	N28	1976 – 1981	Ahmad Indar	Alliance (USNO)
6th	N28	1981 – 1985	Mohammad Jifli	BN (BERJAYA)
7th	N21	1985 – 1986	Salleh Janan	USNO
8th	N21	1986	Salleh Janan	USNO
8th	N21	1986 - 1990	Salleh Janan	BN (USNO)
9th	N21	1990 – 1994	Pitting Mohd Ali	BN (USNO)
10th	N21	1994 – 1999	Nahalan Damsal	BN (UMNO)
11th	N35	1999 – 2004	Nahalan Damsal	BN (UMNO)
12th	N43	2004 – 2008	Samsudin Yahya	BN (UMNO)
13th	N43	2008 – 2013	Samsudin Yahya	BN (UMNO)
14th	N43	2013 – 2018	Samsudin Yahya	BN (UMNO)
15th	N43	2018 – 2020	Arifin Asgali	WARISAN
16th	N53	2020 – 2025	Alias Sani	WARISAN
17th	N53	2025–present	Alias Sani	WARISAN

== Election results ==
Sabah state election, 2025
Party	Candidate	Votes	%	∆%
Heritage	Alias Sani	6,487	40.27	▼13.18
BN	Mohd Zharif Aizat Samsuddin	5,687	35.31	▼3.74
GRS	Diana Diego @ Yusrina Sufiana	1,721	10.68	▲10.68
Independent	Arifin Asgali	1,200	7.45	▲7.45
PN	Mohd Fazuree Awang	725	4.50	▲4.50
Sabah Dream Party	Abada Atalad	288	1.79	▲1.79
Total valid votes		16,108		
Total rejected ballots		316		
Unreturned ballots		23		
Turnout		16,447	59.77	▼5.26
Registered electors		27,518		
Majority		800	4.96	▼9.44
Heritage hold		Swing		
Source(s) "RESULTS OF CONTESTED ELECTION AND STATEMENTS OF THE POLL AFTER THE OFFICIAL ADDITION OF VOTES" (PDF).

Sabah state election, 2020
Party	Candidate	Votes	%	∆%
Sabah Heritage Party	Alias Sani	5,937	53.45	▼1.33
BN	Hazulizah Mohd Dani	4,338	39.05	▲0.81
Love Sabah Party	Sitti Nurul Ain Shaidah Pitting	253	2.28	▲2.28
LDP	Mohd Fazil Ajak	102	0.92	▲0.92
Sabah People's Unity Party	Abidin Sukor	87	0.78	▲0.78
USNO (Baru)	Saran Jumdail	63	0.57	▲0.57
Total valid votes		10,780	97.05	
Total rejected ballots		297	2.67	
Unreturned ballots		31	0.28	
Turnout		11,108	65.13	▼9.34
Registered electors		17,054		
Majority		1,599	14.40	▼2.14
Sabah Heritage Party hold		Swing		
Source(s) "RESULTS OF CONTESTED ELECTION AND STATEMENTS OF THE POLL AFTER THE OFFICIAL ADDITION OF VOTES".

Sabah state election, 2018
Party	Candidate	Votes	%	∆%
Sabah Heritage Party	Arifin Asgali	6,740	54.78	▲54.78
BN	Samsudin Yahya	4,705	38.24	▼23.68
PAS	Sahar Abdul Majid	366	2.97	▲2.97
STAR	Abdul Rashid Abdul Rahman	48	0.39	▼0.56
Independent	Mohd Faisal Bachtiyal	43	0.35	▲0.35
Sabah Nationality Party	Alias Rahmad Benjamin	16	0.13	▲0.13
Total valid votes		11,918	96.86	
Total rejected ballots		337	2.74	
Unreturned ballots		49	0.39	
Turnout		12,304	74.47	▼3.72
Registered electors		16,522		
Majority		2,035	16.54	▼15.15
Sabah Heritage Party gain from BN		Swing		?
Source(s) "RESULTS OF CONTESTED ELECTION AND STATEMENTS OF THE POLL AFTER THE OFFICIAL ADDITION OF VOTES".

Sabah state election, 2013
Party	Candidate	Votes	%	∆%
BN	Samsudin Yahya	6,898	61.92	▼0.11
PKR	Musah Ghani	3,368	30.23	▲0.01
SAPP	Awang @ Abdul Nasip Othman	354	3.18	▲3.18
STAR	Ahmad Ibrahim	100	0.90	▲0.90
Independent	Ilahan Amilbangsa	50	0.45	▲0.45
Total valid votes		10,770	96.68	
Total rejected ballots		351	3.15	
Unreturned ballots		19	0.17	
Turnout		11,140	78.19	▲17.30
Registered electors		14,247		
Majority		3,530	31.69	▼0.10
BN hold		Swing		
Source(s) "KEPUTUSAN PILIHAN RAYA UMUM DEWAN UNDANGAN NEGERI". Archived from the original on 2022-08-18.

Sabah state election, 2008
Party	Candidate	Votes	%	∆%
BN	Samsudin Yahya	4,271	62.03	
PKR	Nalahan Damsal	2,082	30.24	
BERSEKUTU	Mansor Mursalin	242	3.51	
Total valid votes		6,595	95.79	
Total rejected ballots		281	4.08	
Unreturned ballots		9	0.13	
Turnout		6,885	60.89	
Registered electors		11,308		
Majority		2,189	31.79	
BN hold		Swing		
Source(s) "KEPUTUSAN PILIHAN RAYA UMUM DEWAN UNDANGAN NEGERI SABAH BAGI TAHUN 2008".

Sabah state election, 2004
Party	Candidate	Votes	%	∆%
On the nomination day, Samsudin Yahya won uncontested.
BN	Samsudin Yahya			
Total valid votes				
Total rejected ballots				
Unreturned ballots				
Turnout				
Registered electors		10,938		
Majority				
BN hold		Swing		
Source(s) "KEPUTUSAN PILIHAN RAYA UMUM DEWAN UNDANGAN NEGERI SABAH BAGI TAHUN 2004".

Sabah state election, 1999
Party	Candidate	Votes	%	∆%
BN	Nalahan Damsal	3,230	45.30	▼13.43
PBS	Abdul Wahid Hamid	1,860	26.09	▼12.16
BERSEKUTU	Ridi Alawangsa	1,246	17.48	▲17.48
SETIA	Zulkifli Pitting	581	8.15	▲8.15
PAS	Hamzah Abdullah	121	1.70	▲1.70
Total valid votes		7,038	98.71	
Total rejected ballots		92	1.29	
Unreturned ballots		0	0.00	
Turnout		7,130	58.63	▲0.90
Registered electors		12,161		
Majority		1,370	19.21	▼0.27
BN hold		Swing		
Source(s) "KEPUTUSAN PILIHAN RAYA UMUM DEWAN UNDANGAN NEGERI SABAH BAGI TAHUN 1999".

Sabah state election, 1994
Party	Candidate	Votes	%	∆%
BN	Nalahan Damsal	4,667	58.73	▲11.49
PBS	Pitting Mohd Ali	3,119	39.25	▼0.40
Total valid votes		7,786	97.99	
Total rejected ballots		160	2.01	
Unreturned ballots		0	0.00	
Turnout		7,946	57.73	▼3.52
Registered electors		13,764		
Majority		1,548	19.48	▲11.89
BN gain from USNO		Swing		?
Source(s) "KEPUTUSAN PILIHAN RAYA UMUM DEWAN UNDANGAN NEGERI SABAH BAGI TAHUN 1994".

Sabah state election, 1990
Party	Candidate	Votes	%	∆%
USNO	Pitting Mohd Ali	3,240	47.24	▼1.12
PBS	Nalahan Damsal	2,719	39.65	▲5.04
BERJAYA	Aliong Hassan	482	7.03	▲1.40
PRS	Mohammad Jifli	174	2.54	▲2.54
Independent	Abdullah Ibrahim	66	0.96	▲0.96
Independent	Hassnar Berahim	58	0.85	▲0.85
Total valid votes		6,739	98.26	
Total rejected ballots		119	1.74	
Unreturned ballots		0	0.00	
Turnout		6,858	61.25	▼6.71
Registered electors		11,197		
Majority		521	7.59	▲3.92
USNO hold		Swing		
Source(s) "KEPUTUSAN PILIHAN RAYA UMUM DEWAN UNDANGAN NEGERI SABAH BAGI TAHUN 1990".

Sabah state election, 1986
Party	Candidate	Votes	%	∆%
USNO	Salleh Janan	2,450	48.36	▲6.26
PBS	Juhar Mahiruddin	2,264	44.69	▲13.26
BERJAYA	Yee Loi Fook	285	5.63	▲5.63
Total valid votes		4,999	98.68	
Total rejected ballots		67	1.32	
Unreturned ballots		0	0.00	
Turnout		5,066	67.96	▼2.03
Registered electors		7,454		
Majority		186	3.67	▼7.00
USNO hold		Swing		
Source(s) "KEPUTUSAN PILIHAN RAYA UMUM DEWAN UNDANGAN NEGERI SABAH BAGI TAHUN 1986".

Sabah state election, 1985
Party	Candidate	Votes	%	∆%
USNO	Pitting Ali	1,830	42.10	▲42.10
PBS	Nahalan Damsal	1,366	31.43	▲31.43
BERJAYA	Musa Jala	1,102	25.35	▲25.35
Independent	Liew Chung Fatt	49	1.13	▲1.13
Total valid votes		4,347	100.00	
Total rejected ballots		55		
Unreturned ballots		0		
Turnout		4,402	69.72	▼3.82
Registered electors		6,314		
Majority		464	10.67	▼10.99
USNO hold		Swing		

Sabah state election, 1981
Party	Candidate	Votes	%	∆%
BERJAYA	Mohammad Jifli	2,556	59.02	▲3.82
Independent	Pengiran Ahmad Indar	1,618	37.36	▲37.36
Independent	Abdullah Hussain	111	2.56	▲2.56
Independent	Yusof Nasir	46	1.06	▲1.06
Total valid votes		4,331	100.00	
Total rejected ballots		68		
Unreturned ballots		0		
Turnout		4,399	73.54	▼5.38
Registered electors		5,982		
Majority		938	21.66	▼11.27
BERJAYA hold		Swing		

Sabah state election, 1976
Party	Candidate	Votes	%
USNO	Pengiran Ahmad Indar	1,753	55.20
BERJAYA	Mohammad Jifli	1,423	44.80
Total valid votes		3,176	100.00
Total rejected ballots		48	
Unreturned ballots		0	
Turnout		3,224	78.92
Registered electors		4,085	
Majority		330	10.39
This was a new seat created.
