= Flovia Ng =

Malaysian politician

Yang Berhormat Datuk Flovia Ng PGDK ASDK MLA

State Assistant Minister of Community Development and People's Wellbeing of Sabah
- Incumbent
- Assumed office 8 October 2020 Serving with Julita Majungki (2020–2023)
- Minister: Shahelmey Yahya (2020–2023); James Ratib (since 2023)
- Governor: Juhar Mahiruddin
- Chief Minister: Hajiji Noor

Member of the Sabah State Legislative Assembly for Tulid
- In office 26 September 2020 – 29 November 2025
- Preceded by: Position established
- Succeeded by: Jordan Jude Ellron
- Majority: 544 (2020)

Vice President of the Homeland Solidarity Party (Appointed)
- In office 12 July 2024 – 29 November 2025 Serving with Abidin Madingkir (Non-Muslim Bumiputera) & Suling Isib (Non-Muslim Bumiputera) & Apas Nawawi Saking (Muslim Bumiputera) & Mohd Lin Harun (Muslim Bumiputera) & Kong Soon Choi (Chinese) & Beverley Natalie Koh (Chinese) & Annuar Ayub (Appointed)

Women Chief of the Homeland Solidarity Party
- In office 22 October 2021 – 23 June 2024
- Preceded by: Evelyn Gobilie
- Succeeded by: Kerry Chee Kheng Moi

Personal details
- Born: Flovia Ng Pensiangan, Crown Colony of North Borneo (now Sabah, Malaysia)
- Citizenship: Malaysian
- Party: Homeland Solidarity Party (STAR)
- Other political affiliations: Perikatan Nasional (PN) (2020–2022); Gabungan Rakyat Sabah (GRS) (since 2020)
- Spouse: Satunews Malibin
- Occupation: Politician

Flovia Ng is a Malaysian politician who has served as the State Assistant Minister of Community Development and People's Wellbeing of Sabah in the Gabungan Rakyat Sabah (GRS) state administration under Chief Minister Hajiji Noor and Ministers Shahelmey Yahya as well as James Ratib since October 2020 and Member of the Sabah State Legislative Assembly (MLA) for Tulid since September 2020. She is a member of the Homeland Solidarity Party (STAR), a component party of the GRS and formerly Perikatan Nasional (PN) coalitions. She previously served as the Women Chief of STAR from 2021 until June 2024 and currently serving as an appointed Vice President of STAR.

== Election results ==
Sabah State Legislative Assembly
Year	Constituency	Candidate	Votes	Pct	Opponent(s)	Votes	Pct	Ballots cast	Majority	Turnout
2020	N44 Tulid	Flovia Ng (STAR)	2,267	33.45%	Matusin Bowie (PBRS)	1,723	25.43%	6,776	544	76.05%
2020	N44 Tulid	Flovia Ng (STAR)	2,267	33.45%	Mudi Dubing (WARISAN)	1,589	23.45%	6,776	544	76.05%
2020	N44 Tulid	Flovia Ng (STAR)	2,267	33.45%	Suman Yasambun (PBS)	720	10.63%	6,776	544	76.05%
2020	N44 Tulid	Flovia Ng (STAR)	2,267	33.45%	Matusin Timam (PCS)	356	5.25%	6,776	544	76.05%
2020	N44 Tulid	Flovia Ng (STAR)	2,267	33.45%	Mohamad Khairy Abdullah (USNO Baru)	69	1.02%	6,776	544	76.05%
2020	N44 Tulid	Flovia Ng (STAR)	2,267	33.45%	Dahalan Abdullah (LDP)	52	0.77%	6,776	544	76.05%

== Honours ==
- Sabah
  - Commander of the Order of Kinabalu (PGDK) – Datuk (2022)
  - Companion of the Order of Kinabalu (ASDK) (2021)
