= Arifin Asgali =

Malaysian politician

Ministerial roles (Sabah)
- 2018–2020: Assistant Minister to the Chief Minister

Faction represented in Sabah State Legislative Assembly
- 2018–2020: Sabah Heritage Party

Personal details
- Born: Arifin bin Asgali Batu Sapi, Crown Colony of North Borneo (now Sabah, Malaysia)
- Citizenship: Malaysian
- Party: Sabah Heritage Party (WARISAN) (2016-2023); Parti Gagasan Rakyat Sabah (Gagasan Rakyat) (official member since 2024)
- Other political affiliations: Gabungan Rakyat Sabah (GRS) (official coalition member since 2024)
- Occupation: Politician

Arifin bin Asgali is a Malaysian politician who has been the State Assistant Minister. He served as the Member of Sabah State Legislative Assembly (MLA) for Sekong from May 2018 until September 2020. He was a former member of the Sabah Heritage Party (WARISAN) from 2016 until 2023. Since 2024, He currently a member of Parti Gagasan Rakyat Sabah or better known as "Gagasan Rakyat", a component party of Gabungan Rakyat Sabah (GRS) coalition.

== Election results ==
Sabah State Legislative Assembly
Year	Constituency	Candidate	Votes	Pct	Opponent(s)	Votes	Pct	Ballots cast	Majority	Turnout
2018	N43 Sekong	Arifin Asgali (WARISAN)	6,740	56.56%	Samsudin Yahya (UMNO)	4,705	39.48%	12,304	2,035	74.50%
2018	N43 Sekong	Arifin Asgali (WARISAN)	6,740	56.56%	Sahar Abdul Majid (PAS)	366	3.07%	12,304	2,035	74.50%
2018	N43 Sekong	Arifin Asgali (WARISAN)	6,740	56.56%	Abdul Rashid Abdul Rahman (STAR)	48	0.40%	12,304	2,035	74.50%
2018	N43 Sekong	Arifin Asgali (WARISAN)	6,740	56.56%	Datu Mohd Faisal Datu Bachtiyal (IND)	43	0.36%	12,304	2,035	74.50%
2018	N43 Sekong	Arifin Asgali (WARISAN)	6,740	56.56%	Alias Rahmad Benjamin (PKS)	16	0.13%	12,304	2,035	74.50%
