= Sungai Manila =

Sungai Manila (N51)
Sabah constituency

State constituency
- Legislature: Sabah State Legislative Assembly
MLA
Hazeem Mubarak Musa
GRS
- Constituency created: 2019
- First contested: 2020
- Last contested: 2025

Demographics
- Electors (2025): 18,271

Sungai Manila is a state constituency in Sabah, Malaysia, that is represented in the Sabah State Legislative Assembly. This is one of the thirteen new state constituencies as result of approval from state legislative and Dewan Rakyat on 17 July 2019 and presenting for the first time for snap election

== Demographics ==
As of 2020, Sungai Manila has a population of 23,016 people.

Ethnic breakdown of Sungai Manila's electorate as of 2025
1. Muslim Bumiputera (80.0%)
2. Chinese (15.0%)
3. Non-Muslim Bumiputera (4.00%)
4. Other ethnicities (1.00%)

== History ==
=== Polling districts ===
According to the gazette issued on 31 October, the Sungai Manila constituency has a total of 5 polling districts.

State constituency	Polling Districts	Code	Location
Sungai Manila（N51）	Sungai Batang	184/51/01	MRSM Tun Mohammad Fuad Stephens; SK Sibuga Besar
Sungai Manila（N51）	Sungai Manila	184/51/02	SMK Libaran
Sungai Manila（N51）	Batu 8 Jalan Labuk	184/51/03	SMK Taman Fajar
Sungai Manila（N51）	Sungai Padas	184/51/04	SK Sungai Padas
Sungai Manila（N51）	Rancangan Lubuh	184/51/05	SK Rancangan Lubuh
Sungai Manila（N51）	Tanjung Pisau	184/51/06	SK Tanjong Pisau

=== Representation history ===
Members of the Legislative Assembly for Sungai Manila
Assembly	No	Years	Member	Party
Constituency created from Sungai Sibuga and Gum-Gum
16th	N51	2020–2025	Mokran Ingkat	BN (UMNO)
17th	N51	2025–present	Hazeem Mubarak Musa	GRS (GAGASAN)

== Election results ==
Sabah state election, 2025: Sungai Manila
Party	Candidate	Votes	%	∆%
GRS	Hazeem Mubarak Musa	4,349	37.89	▲37.89
BN	Zaini Tiksun	3,089	26.91	▼27.00
Heritage	Sitinara Sakar	2,863	24.94	▼12.31
PN	Yusri Abu	811	7.07	▲7.07
Sabah Dream Party	Irian Nanang	251	2.19	▲2.19
Sabah People's Unity Party	Faizal Wahab	115	1.00	▲1.00
Total valid votes		11,478		
Total rejected ballots		273		
Unreturned ballots		13		
Turnout		11,764	64.58	▼2.07
Registered electors		18,271		
Majority		1,260	10.98	▼5.68
GRS gain from BN		Swing		-
Source(s) "RESULTS OF CONTESTED ELECTION AND STATEMENTS OF THE POLL AFTER THE OFFICIAL ADDITION OF VOTES" (PDF).

Sabah state election, 2020: Sungai Manila
Party	Candidate	Votes	%
BN	Mokran Ingkat	4,585	53.91
Sabah Heritage Party	Mahmud Sudin	3,168	37.25
Love Sabah Party	Sahidzan Salleh	191	2.25
USNO (Baru)	K Zulkipli Harrith	111	1.31
LDP	Mohd Anuar Ma Yusuf	100	1.18
Sabah People's Unity Party	Mohd Arshad Abdul	90	1.06
Total valid votes		8,245	96.94
Total rejected ballots		221	2.60
Unreturned ballots		39	0.46
Turnout		8,505	66.65
Registered electors		12,761	
Majority		1,417	16.66
This was a new constituency created.
Source(s) "RESULTS OF CONTESTED ELECTION AND STATEMENTS OF THE POLL AFTER THE OFFICIAL ADDITION OF VOTES".
