= Results of the 2025 Sabah state election =

Malaysian state, Sabah election in 2025

These are the election results of the 2025 Sabah state election. State assembly elections were held in Sabah, Malaysia on 29 November 2025.. Results are expected to come on the same day, after 5 pm. Elected members of the legislative assembly (MLAs) will be representing their constituency from the first sitting of respective state legislative assembly to its dissolution.

The state legislature election deposit was set at RM5,000 per candidate. Similar to previous elections, the election deposit will be forfeited if the particular candidate had failed to secure at least 12.5% or one-eighth of the votes.

== Summary ==
| Party or alliance | | Votes | % | Seats | +/– |
|---|---|---|---|---|---|
| Sabah Heritage Party | | 288,703 | 25.57 | 25 | +11 |
| Gabungan Rakyat Sabah | Parti Gagasan Rakyat Sabah | 204,412 | 18.11 | 22 | -9 |
| Gabungan Rakyat Sabah | United Sabah Party | 55,909 | 4.95 | 7 | 0 |
| Gabungan Rakyat Sabah | United Sabah National Organisation (New) | 5,326 | 0.47 | 0 | 0 |
| Gabungan Rakyat Sabah | Love Sabah Party | 4,604 | 0.41 | 0 | 0 |
| Gabungan Rakyat Sabah | Sabah People's Hope Party | 2,063 | 0.18 | 0 | 0 |
| Gabungan Rakyat Sabah | Gabungan Rakyat Sabah Direct candidates | 14,075 | 1.25 | 0 | 0 |
| Gabungan Rakyat Sabah | Total | 286,389 | 25.37 | 29 | -9 |
| Barisan Nasional | United Malays National Organisation | 130,648 | 11.57 | 5 | -8 |
| Barisan Nasional | Sabah United People's Party | 10,184 | 0.90 | 1 | +1 |
| Barisan Nasional | Malaysian Chinese Association | 3,752 | 0.33 | 0 | 0 |
| Barisan Nasional | Total | 144,584 | 12.81 | 6 | -7 |
| Pakatan Harapan | People's Justice Party | 39,747 | 3.52 | 1 | -1 |
| Pakatan Harapan | Democratic Action Party | 34,786 | 3.08 | 0 | -4 |
| Pakatan Harapan | National Trust Party | 1,405 | 0.12 | 0 | 0 |
| Pakatan Harapan | Total | 75,938 | 6.73 | 1 | -5 |
| Homeland Solidarity Party | | 73,410 | 6.50 | 2 | -4 |
| United Progressive Kinabalu Organisation | | 64,471 | 5.71 | 3 | +2 |
| Social Democratic Harmony Party | | 54,050 | 4.79 | 1 | -1 |
| Perikatan Nasional | Malaysian United Indigenous Party | 24,978 | 2.21 | 0 | 0 |
| Perikatan Nasional | Malaysian Islamic Party | 15,214 | 1.35 | 1 | +1 |
| Perikatan Nasional | Parti Gerakan Rakyat Malaysia | 1,392 | 0.12 | 0 | 0 |
| Perikatan Nasional | Total | 41,584 | 3.68 | 1 | 1 |
| Parti Impian Sabah | | 13,265 | 1.17 | 0 | 0 |
| Sabah Progressive Party | | 7,733 | 0.68 | 0 | 0 |
| Sabah Native Co-operation Party | | 1,542 | 0.14 | 0 | 0 |
| Sabah Nationality Party | | 1,477 | 0.13 | 0 | 0 |
| Perjuangan Rakyat | | 1,414 | 0.13 | 0 | 0 |
| Parti Bumi Kenyalang | | 1,337 | 0.12 | 0 | 0 |
| Sabah People's Unity Party | | 1,124 | 0.10 | 0 | 0 |
| Parti Rumpun Sabah | | 898 | 0.08 | 0 | 0 |
| Sabah Peace Party | | 429 | 0.04 | 0 | 0 |
| Pertubuhan Gemilang Anak Sabah | | 293 | 0.03 | 0 | 0 |
| Parti Bangsa Malaysia | | 213 | 0.02 | 0 | 0 |
| Parti Aspirasi Rakyat Sarawak | | 141 | 0.01 | 0 | 0 |
| Malaysian United People's Party | | 131 | 0.01 | 0 | 0 |
| Sabah National People's Unity Organisation | | 73 | 0.01 | 0 | 0 |
| Independents | | 69,771 | 6.18 | 5 | +2 |
| Total | | 1,128,970 | 100.00 | 73 | – |
| Valid votes | | 1,128,970 | 98.30 | | |
| Invalid/blank votes | | 19,506 | 1.70 | | |
| Total votes | | 1,148,476 | 100.00 | | |
| Registered voters/turnout | | 1,784,843 | 64.35 | | |
Source: Election Commissioners of Malaysia

== Full result ==
| No. | Parliamentary Constituency | # | Constituency | Winner | Party | Votes | Opponents | Party | Votes | Majority | Incumbent |
|---|---|---|---|---|---|---|---|---|---|---|---|
GRS 29 | WARISAN 25 | BN 6 | Independent 5 | UPKO 3 | STAR 2 | PN 1 | KDM 1 | PH 1
| P167 | Kudat | N01 | Banggi | Mohammad Mohamarin | GRS–GAGASAN | 2,484 | Zainal Romio | WARISAN | 1,178 | 1,306 | Mohammad Mohamarin (GRS–GAGASAN) |
| P167 | Kudat | N01 | Banggi | Mohammad Mohamarin | GRS–GAGASAN | 2,484 | Nasib Samodi @ Samsuri | IND | 561 | 1,306 | Mohammad Mohamarin (GRS–GAGASAN) |
| P167 | Kudat | N01 | Banggi | Mohammad Mohamarin | GRS–GAGASAN | 2,484 | Normalah Rasik | BN–UMNO | 470 | 1,306 | Mohammad Mohamarin (GRS–GAGASAN) |
| P167 | Kudat | N01 | Banggi | Mohammad Mohamarin | GRS–GAGASAN | 2,484 | Among Timbul | PIS | 371 | 1,306 | Mohammad Mohamarin (GRS–GAGASAN) |
| P167 | Kudat | N01 | Banggi | Mohammad Mohamarin | GRS–GAGASAN | 2,484 | Rahimah Majid | PN–BERSATU | 296 | 1,306 | Mohammad Mohamarin (GRS–GAGASAN) |
| P167 | Kudat | N01 | Banggi | Mohammad Mohamarin | GRS–GAGASAN | 2,484 | Salbin Muksid | STAR | 70 | 1,306 | Mohammad Mohamarin (GRS–GAGASAN) |
| P167 | Kudat | N01 | Banggi | Mohammad Mohamarin | GRS–GAGASAN | 2,484 | Hussin @ Taliyasin Masuddin | IND | 29 | 1,306 | Mohammad Mohamarin (GRS–GAGASAN) |
| P167 | Kudat | N01 | Banggi | Mohammad Mohamarin | GRS–GAGASAN | 2,484 | Datu Razak Datu Salam | ANAKNEGERI | 28 | 1,306 | Mohammad Mohamarin (GRS–GAGASAN) |
| P167 | Kudat | N01 | Banggi | Mohammad Mohamarin | GRS–GAGASAN | 2,484 | Azlan @ Raymon Majumah | PKS | 26 | 1,306 | Mohammad Mohamarin (GRS–GAGASAN) |
| P167 | Kudat | N01 | Banggi | Mohammad Mohamarin | GRS–GAGASAN | 2,484 | Sakinolin Mohamad | IND | 25 | 1,306 | Mohammad Mohamarin (GRS–GAGASAN) |
| P167 | Kudat | N01 | Banggi | Mohammad Mohamarin | GRS–GAGASAN | 2,484 | Halman Maniuk | PBK | 6 | 1,306 | Mohammad Mohamarin (GRS–GAGASAN) |
| P167 | Kudat | N02 | Bengkoka | Harun Durabi | BN–UMNO | 2,485 | Samuil Mopun | GRS–GAGASAN | 2,408 | 88 | Harun Durabi (BN–UMNO) |
| P167 | Kudat | N02 | Bengkoka | Harun Durabi | BN–UMNO | 2,485 | Maklin Masiau | STAR | 1,899 | 88 | Harun Durabi (BN–UMNO) |
| P167 | Kudat | N02 | Bengkoka | Harun Durabi | BN–UMNO | 2,485 | Rahim @ Richard Mazagi | KDM | 1,899 | 88 | Harun Durabi (BN–UMNO) |
| P167 | Kudat | N02 | Bengkoka | Harun Durabi | BN–UMNO | 2,485 | Fauziah Mohd Fuad Stephens | WARISAN | 1,290 | 88 | Harun Durabi (BN–UMNO) |
| P167 | Kudat | N02 | Bengkoka | Harun Durabi | BN–UMNO | 2,485 | Jomin Mogompit | IND | 1,084 | 88 | Harun Durabi (BN–UMNO) |
| P167 | Kudat | N02 | Bengkoka | Harun Durabi | BN–UMNO | 2,485 | Junsim Rumunzing | UPKO | 622 | 88 | Harun Durabi (BN–UMNO) |
| P167 | Kudat | N02 | Bengkoka | Harun Durabi | BN–UMNO | 2,485 | Berusli Kimin | PN–BERSATU | 310 | 88 | Harun Durabi (BN–UMNO) |
| P167 | Kudat | N02 | Bengkoka | Harun Durabi | BN–UMNO | 2,485 | Matin Ugung | PIS | 183 | 88 | Harun Durabi (BN–UMNO) |
| P167 | Kudat | N02 | Bengkoka | Harun Durabi | BN–UMNO | 2,485 | Gunsanad Malingka | PBK | 26 | 88 | Harun Durabi (BN–UMNO) |
| P167 | Kudat | N02 | Bengkoka | Harun Durabi | BN–UMNO | 2,485 | Kpd Oding | IND | 21 | 88 | Harun Durabi (BN–UMNO) |
| P167 | Kudat | N03 | Pitas | Ruddy Awah | GRS–GAGASAN | 5,754 | Harun Ismail | WARISAN | 4,189 | 1,565 | Ruddy Awah (GRS–GAGASAN) |
| P167 | Kudat | N03 | Pitas | Ruddy Awah | GRS–GAGASAN | 5,754 | Normalah Rasik | BN–UMNO | 1,331 | 1,565 | Ruddy Awah (GRS–GAGASAN) |
| P167 | Kudat | N03 | Pitas | Ruddy Awah | GRS–GAGASAN | 5,754 | Kinchin Boulot | PIS | 425 | 1,565 | Ruddy Awah (GRS–GAGASAN) |
| P167 | Kudat | N03 | Pitas | Ruddy Awah | GRS–GAGASAN | 5,754 | Abd Hamid Kimin | KDM | 266 | 1,565 | Ruddy Awah (GRS–GAGASAN) |
| P167 | Kudat | N03 | Pitas | Ruddy Awah | GRS–GAGASAN | 5,754 | Nazri Santong | IND | 131 | 1,565 | Ruddy Awah (GRS–GAGASAN) |
| P167 | Kudat | N04 | Tanjong Kapor | Ben Chong Chen Bin | GRS–GAGASAN | 6,171 | Verdon Bahanda | IND | 5,812 | 359 | Ben Chong Chen Bin (GRS–GAGASAN) |
| P167 | Kudat | N04 | Tanjong Kapor | Ben Chong Chen Bin | GRS–GAGASAN | 6,171 | Terrence Au Soon Fui | WARISAN | 4,737 | 359 | Ben Chong Chen Bin (GRS–GAGASAN) |
| P167 | Kudat | N04 | Tanjong Kapor | Ben Chong Chen Bin | GRS–GAGASAN | 6,171 | Kevin Lee Sip Kim | BN–MCA | 1,455 | 359 | Ben Chong Chen Bin (GRS–GAGASAN) |
| P167 | Kudat | N04 | Tanjong Kapor | Ben Chong Chen Bin | GRS–GAGASAN | 6,171 | Muhammad Affan Jumahat | PN–BERSATU | 1,455 | 359 | Ben Chong Chen Bin (GRS–GAGASAN) |
| P167 | Kudat | N04 | Tanjong Kapor | Ben Chong Chen Bin | GRS–GAGASAN | 6,171 | Shawn Davey Lee | STAR | 434 | 359 | Ben Chong Chen Bin (GRS–GAGASAN) |
| P167 | Kudat | N04 | Tanjong Kapor | Ben Chong Chen Bin | GRS–GAGASAN | 6,171 | Jetol Dangin | PIS | 184 | 359 | Ben Chong Chen Bin (GRS–GAGASAN) |
| P167 | Kudat | N04 | Tanjong Kapor | Ben Chong Chen Bin | GRS–GAGASAN | 6,171 | Abdul Halim Yussof | PBK | 166 | 359 | Ben Chong Chen Bin (GRS–GAGASAN) |
| P167 | Kudat | N04 | Tanjong Kapor | Ben Chong Chen Bin | GRS–GAGASAN | 6,171 | Abdul Rahim Madtaip | IND | 105 | 359 | Ben Chong Chen Bin (GRS–GAGASAN) |
| P167 | Kudat | N04 | Tanjong Kapor | Ben Chong Chen Bin | GRS–GAGASAN | 6,171 | Awang Karim Abdul Kadir | ANAKNEGERI | 63 | 359 | Ben Chong Chen Bin (GRS–GAGASAN) |
| P167 | Kudat | N04 | Tanjong Kapor | Ben Chong Chen Bin | GRS–GAGASAN | 6,171 | Bonny Berman | SPP | 52 | 359 | Ben Chong Chen Bin (GRS–GAGASAN) |
| P168 | Kota Marudu | N05 | Matunggong | Julita Majungki | GRS–PBS | 9,096 | Wetrom Bahanda | KDM | 8,762 | 334 | Julita Majungki (GRS–PBS) |
| P168 | Kota Marudu | N05 | Matunggong | Julita Majungki | GRS–PBS | 9,096 | Jornah Mozihim | WARISAN | 1,138 | 334 | Julita Majungki (GRS–PBS) |
| P168 | Kota Marudu | N05 | Matunggong | Julita Majungki | GRS–PBS | 9,096 | J.Ojilim Hasam | PIS | 133 | 334 | Julita Majungki (GRS–PBS) |
| P168 | Kota Marudu | N05 | Matunggong | Julita Majungki | GRS–PBS | 9,096 | Ainin Ekon | IND | 75 | 334 | Julita Majungki (GRS–PBS) |
| P168 | Kota Marudu | N05 | Matunggong | Julita Majungki | GRS–PBS | 9,096 | Freddy Chong Yee Vui | PKS | 45 | 334 | Julita Majungki (GRS–PBS) |
| P168 | Kota Marudu | N06 | Bandau | Maijol Mahap | IND | 3,996 | Redonah Bahanda | GRS–GAGASAN | 3,752 | 244 | Wetrom Bahanda (KDM) |
| P168 | Kota Marudu | N06 | Bandau | Maijol Mahap | IND | 3,996 | Zaidi Jatil | PH–PKR | 2,631 | 244 | Wetrom Bahanda (KDM) |
| P168 | Kota Marudu | N06 | Bandau | Maijol Mahap | IND | 3,996 | Jaiping Minsu | KDM | 2,471 | 244 | Wetrom Bahanda (KDM) |
| P168 | Kota Marudu | N06 | Bandau | Maijol Mahap | IND | 3,996 | Rizham Abd Rahman | WARISAN | 1,613 | 244 | Wetrom Bahanda (KDM) |
| P168 | Kota Marudu | N06 | Bandau | Maijol Mahap | IND | 3,996 | Shirewin D.Patrick | STAR | 1,189 | 244 | Wetrom Bahanda (KDM) |
| P168 | Kota Marudu | N06 | Bandau | Maijol Mahap | IND | 3,996 | Suzie Salapan | UPKO | 859 | 244 | Wetrom Bahanda (KDM) |
| P168 | Kota Marudu | N06 | Bandau | Maijol Mahap | IND | 3,996 | Jolius Majawai | IND | 472 | 244 | Wetrom Bahanda (KDM) |
| P168 | Kota Marudu | N06 | Bandau | Maijol Mahap | IND | 3,996 | Willey Lampaki | BN–UMNO | 380 | 244 | Wetrom Bahanda (KDM) |
| P168 | Kota Marudu | N06 | Bandau | Maijol Mahap | IND | 3,996 | Sauting Rabuyot | PIS | 97 | 244 | Wetrom Bahanda (KDM) |
| P168 | Kota Marudu | N06 | Bandau | Maijol Mahap | IND | 3,996 | Norman Tulang | ASPIRASI | 30 | 244 | Wetrom Bahanda (KDM) |
| P168 | Kota Marudu | N06 | Bandau | Maijol Mahap | IND | 3,996 | Sitti Haima Jailani | PKS | 24 | 244 | Wetrom Bahanda (KDM) |
| P168 | Kota Marudu | N07 | Tandek | Hendrus Anding | GRS–PBS | 7,554 | Arlinsia Agang | STAR | 4,528 | 3,026 | Julita Majungki (GRS–PBS) |
| P168 | Kota Marudu | N07 | Tandek | Hendrus Anding | GRS–PBS | 7,554 | Benson Tuyundo | KDM | 2,893 | 3,026 | Julita Majungki (GRS–PBS) |
| P168 | Kota Marudu | N07 | Tandek | Hendrus Anding | GRS–PBS | 7,554 | Jilid @ Zainuddin Kuiminding | WARISAN | 1,674 | 3,026 | Julita Majungki (GRS–PBS) |
| P168 | Kota Marudu | N07 | Tandek | Hendrus Anding | GRS–PBS | 7,554 | Jamil Majingkin | UPKO | 417 | 3,026 | Julita Majungki (GRS–PBS) |
| P168 | Kota Marudu | N07 | Tandek | Hendrus Anding | GRS–PBS | 7,554 | Abel Pangair | PIS | 235 | 3,026 | Julita Majungki (GRS–PBS) |
| P168 | Kota Marudu | N07 | Tandek | Hendrus Anding | GRS–PBS | 7,554 | Zaman Bayang | PKS | 132 | 3,026 | Julita Majungki (GRS–PBS) |
| P168 | Kota Marudu | N07 | Tandek | Hendrus Anding | GRS–PBS | 7,554 | James Gantuok | PBK | 78 | 3,026 | Julita Majungki (GRS–PBS) |
| P169 | Kota Belud | N08 | Pintasan | Fairuz Renddan | IND | 4,675 | Pandikar Amin Mulia | GRS–USNO | 3,605 | 1,070 | Fairuz Renddan (GRS–GAGASAN) |
| P169 | Kota Belud | N08 | Pintasan | Fairuz Renddan | IND | 4,675 | Abdullah Otong | WARISAN | 1,167 | 1,070 | Fairuz Renddan (GRS–GAGASAN) |
| P169 | Kota Belud | N08 | Pintasan | Fairuz Renddan | IND | 4,675 | Tadzul Radim | BN–UMNO | 1,024 | 1,070 | Fairuz Renddan (GRS–GAGASAN) |
| P169 | Kota Belud | N08 | Pintasan | Fairuz Renddan | IND | 4,675 | Almudin Kaida | KDM | 365 | 1,070 | Fairuz Renddan (GRS–GAGASAN) |
| P169 | Kota Belud | N08 | Pintasan | Fairuz Renddan | IND | 4,675 | Tajuddin Padis | Independent | 356 | 1,070 | Fairuz Renddan (GRS–GAGASAN) |
| P169 | Kota Belud | N08 | Pintasan | Fairuz Renddan | IND | 4,675 | Raplin Samat | STAR | 210 | 1,070 | Fairuz Renddan (GRS–GAGASAN) |
| P169 | Kota Belud | N08 | Pintasan | Fairuz Renddan | IND | 4,675 | Awang Salleh Makmud | PN–BERSATU | 196 | 1,070 | Fairuz Renddan (GRS–GAGASAN) |
| P169 | Kota Belud | N08 | Pintasan | Fairuz Renddan | IND | 4,675 | Mohd Rizal Saiman | IND | 116 | 1,070 | Fairuz Renddan (GRS–GAGASAN) |
| P169 | Kota Belud | N08 | Pintasan | Fairuz Renddan | IND | 4,675 | Syarif Mohd Shukree Danchingan | Independent | 102 | 1,070 | Fairuz Renddan (GRS–GAGASAN) |
| P169 | Kota Belud | N08 | Pintasan | Fairuz Renddan | IND | 4,675 | Lomog Rudin @ Efejus Rudin | PIS | 75 | 1,070 | Fairuz Renddan (GRS–GAGASAN) |
| P169 | Kota Belud | N09 | Tempasuk | Mohd Arsad Bistari | GRS–GAGASAN | 4,914 | Normalah Rasik | BN–UMNO | 3,093 | 1,821 | Mohd Arsad Bistari (GRS–GAGASAN) |
| P169 | Kota Belud | N09 | Tempasuk | Mohd Arsad Bistari | GRS–GAGASAN | 4,914 | Mohd Khidir Lamsil | WARISAN | 2,392 | 1,821 | Mohd Arsad Bistari (GRS–GAGASAN) |
| P169 | Kota Belud | N09 | Tempasuk | Mohd Arsad Bistari | GRS–GAGASAN | 4,914 | Walter Mark Mukis | STAR | 1,275 | 1,821 | Mohd Arsad Bistari (GRS–GAGASAN) |
| P169 | Kota Belud | N09 | Tempasuk | Mohd Arsad Bistari | GRS–GAGASAN | 4,914 | John Samud | KDM | 369 | 1,821 | Mohd Arsad Bistari (GRS–GAGASAN) |
| P169 | Kota Belud | N09 | Tempasuk | Mohd Arsad Bistari | GRS–GAGASAN | 4,914 | Rimin Maun | PKS | 190 | 1,821 | Mohd Arsad Bistari (GRS–GAGASAN) |
| P169 | Kota Belud | N09 | Tempasuk | Mohd Arsad Bistari | GRS–GAGASAN | 4,914 | Timuti Majitol | PIS | 117 | 1,821 | Mohd Arsad Bistari (GRS–GAGASAN) |
| P169 | Kota Belud | N10 | Usukan | Isnaraissah Munirah Majilis | WARISAN | 6,292 | Salleh Said Keruak | BN–UMNO | 5,850 | 442 | Salleh Said Keruak (BN–UMNO) |
| P169 | Kota Belud | N10 | Usukan | Isnaraissah Munirah Majilis | WARISAN | 6,292 | Japlin Akim | GRS–GAGASAN | 5,179 | 442 | Salleh Said Keruak (BN–UMNO) |
| P169 | Kota Belud | N10 | Usukan | Isnaraissah Munirah Majilis | WARISAN | 6,292 | Lin Harun | STAR | 179 | 442 | Salleh Said Keruak (BN–UMNO) |
| P169 | Kota Belud | N10 | Usukan | Isnaraissah Munirah Majilis | WARISAN | 6,292 | Matin Ugung | PIS | 97 | 442 | Salleh Said Keruak (BN–UMNO) |
| P169 | Kota Belud | N10 | Usukan | Isnaraissah Munirah Majilis | WARISAN | 6,292 | Ajun Meliyon | IND | 52 | 442 | Salleh Said Keruak (BN–UMNO) |
| P169 | Kota Belud | N11 | Kadamaian | Ewon Benedick | UPKO | 11,977 | Mudezam Muyau @ James Muyou | GRS–PBS | 2,305 | 9,672 | Ewon Benedick (PH–UPKO) |
| P169 | Kota Belud | N11 | Kadamaian | Ewon Benedick | UPKO | 11,977 | Norman Simon | WARISAN | 2,222 | 9,672 | Ewon Benedick (PH–UPKO) |
| P169 | Kota Belud | N11 | Kadamaian | Ewon Benedick | UPKO | 11,977 | Davylandon Rubbin | STAR | 981 | 9,672 | Ewon Benedick (PH–UPKO) |
| P169 | Kota Belud | N11 | Kadamaian | Ewon Benedick | UPKO | 11,977 | Josely Taising | KDM | 564 | 9,672 | Ewon Benedick (PH–UPKO) |
| P169 | Kota Belud | N11 | Kadamaian | Ewon Benedick | UPKO | 11,977 | Judin Tingih | PBM | 84 | 9,672 | Ewon Benedick (PH–UPKO) |
| P169 | Kota Belud | N11 | Kadamaian | Ewon Benedick | UPKO | 11,977 | Daibi Mandadi | PIS | 74 | 9,672 | Ewon Benedick (PH–UPKO) |
| P169 | Kota Belud | N11 | Kadamaian | Ewon Benedick | UPKO | 11,977 | Priskilla Akwila | ANAKNEGERI | 52 | 9,672 | Ewon Benedick (PH–UPKO) |
| P170 | Tuaran | N12 | Sulaman | Hajiji Noor | GRS–GAGASAN | 10,639 | Shahnon Rizal Thaijudin | BN–UMNO | 1,720 | 8,919 | Hajiji Noor (GRS–GAGASAN) |
| P170 | Tuaran | N12 | Sulaman | Hajiji Noor | GRS–GAGASAN | 10,639 | Mokhtar Hussin | WARISAN | 1,383 | 8,919 | Hajiji Noor (GRS–GAGASAN) |
| P170 | Tuaran | N12 | Sulaman | Hajiji Noor | GRS–GAGASAN | 10,639 | Siti Aminah Ele | PN–BERSATU | 1,275 | 8,919 | Hajiji Noor (GRS–GAGASAN) |
| P170 | Tuaran | N12 | Sulaman | Hajiji Noor | GRS–GAGASAN | 10,639 | Pajudin Nordin | PIS | 117 | 8,919 | Hajiji Noor (GRS–GAGASAN) |
| P170 | Tuaran | N13 | Pantai Dalit | Jasnih Daya | GRS–GAGASAN | 8,306 | Alfian Sambas | BN–UMNO | 4,841 | 3,465 | Jasnih Daya (GRS–GAGASAN) |
| P170 | Tuaran | N13 | Pantai Dalit | Jasnih Daya | GRS–GAGASAN | 8,306 | Aliasgar Basri | WARISAN | 2,878 | 3,465 | Jasnih Daya (GRS–GAGASAN) |
| P170 | Tuaran | N13 | Pantai Dalit | Jasnih Daya | GRS–GAGASAN | 8,306 | Francis Fahir @ Tongong | STAR | 1,282 | 3,465 | Jasnih Daya (GRS–GAGASAN) |
| P170 | Tuaran | N13 | Pantai Dalit | Jasnih Daya | GRS–GAGASAN | 8,306 | Mohd Zulkernain Osman | PN–BERSATU | 814 | 3,465 | Jasnih Daya (GRS–GAGASAN) |
| P170 | Tuaran | N13 | Pantai Dalit | Jasnih Daya | GRS–GAGASAN | 8,306 | Jaesman @ Jaess Gipin | KDM | 387 | 3,465 | Jasnih Daya (GRS–GAGASAN) |
| P170 | Tuaran | N13 | Pantai Dalit | Jasnih Daya | GRS–GAGASAN | 8,306 | Liam Tawil | PIS | 106 | 3,465 | Jasnih Daya (GRS–GAGASAN) |
| P170 | Tuaran | N14 | Tamparuli | Wilfred Madius Tangau | UPKO | 8,247 | Bonaventure Boniface | GRS–PBS | 5,691 | 2,556 | Jahid Jahim (GRS–PBS) |
| P170 | Tuaran | N14 | Tamparuli | Wilfred Madius Tangau | UPKO | 8,247 | Jintoh Sontori | STAR | 1,399 | 2,556 | Jahid Jahim (GRS–PBS) |
| P170 | Tuaran | N14 | Tamparuli | Wilfred Madius Tangau | UPKO | 8,247 | Joseph Lee | WARISAN | 1,082 | 2,556 | Jahid Jahim (GRS–PBS) |
| P170 | Tuaran | N14 | Tamparuli | Wilfred Madius Tangau | UPKO | 8,247 | Gaim @ James Lunkapis | KDM | 697 | 2,556 | Jahid Jahim (GRS–PBS) |
| P170 | Tuaran | N14 | Tamparuli | Wilfred Madius Tangau | UPKO | 8,247 | Vun Yun Fuk | IND | 377 | 2,556 | Jahid Jahim (GRS–PBS) |
| P170 | Tuaran | N14 | Tamparuli | Wilfred Madius Tangau | UPKO | 8,247 | Johan Jahid | IND | 258 | 2,556 | Jahid Jahim (GRS–PBS) |
| P170 | Tuaran | N14 | Tamparuli | Wilfred Madius Tangau | UPKO | 8,247 | Julia Ongkili | PIS | 238 | 2,556 | Jahid Jahim (GRS–PBS) |
| P170 | Tuaran | N14 | Tamparuli | Wilfred Madius Tangau | UPKO | 8,247 | Raymond Alfred | IND | 229 | 2,556 | Jahid Jahim (GRS–PBS) |
| P170 | Tuaran | N14 | Tamparuli | Wilfred Madius Tangau | UPKO | 8,247 | Aliusus Sipil @ Abdul Aziz | RUMPUN | 88 | 2,556 | Jahid Jahim (GRS–PBS) |
| P170 | Tuaran | N14 | Tamparuli | Wilfred Madius Tangau | UPKO | 8,247 | Arthur Erik Lee | ANAKNEGERI | 33 | 2,556 | Jahid Jahim (GRS–PBS) |
| P170 | Tuaran | N14 | Tamparuli | Wilfred Madius Tangau | UPKO | 8,247 | Andrew Mali | IND | 30 | 2,556 | Jahid Jahim (GRS–PBS) |
| P170 | Tuaran | N14 | Tamparuli | Wilfred Madius Tangau | UPKO | 8,247 | Razali Koroh | IND | 14 | 2,556 | Jahid Jahim (GRS–PBS) |
| P170 | Tuaran | N15 | Kiulu | Joniston Bangkuai | GRS–PBS | 4,316 | Terence Sinti | STAR | 2,879 | 2,556 | Joniston Bangkuai (GRS–PBS) |
| P170 | Tuaran | N15 | Kiulu | Joniston Bangkuai | GRS–PBS | 4,316 | Joisin Romut | UPKO | 2,736 | 2,556 | Joniston Bangkuai (GRS–PBS) |
| P170 | Tuaran | N15 | Kiulu | Joniston Bangkuai | GRS–PBS | 4,316 | Henry Saimpon | KDM | 1,192 | 2,556 | Joniston Bangkuai (GRS–PBS) |
| P170 | Tuaran | N15 | Kiulu | Joniston Bangkuai | GRS–PBS | 4,316 | Saibin Gunsari | WARISAN | 389 | 2,556 | Joniston Bangkuai (GRS–PBS) |
| P170 | Tuaran | N15 | Kiulu | Joniston Bangkuai | GRS–PBS | 4,316 | Trevor Maringking | ANAKNEGERI | 176 | 2,556 | Joniston Bangkuai (GRS–PBS) |
| P170 | Tuaran | N15 | Kiulu | Joniston Bangkuai | GRS–PBS | 4,316 | Niyky @ Niky J.Bosikol | PIS | 78 | 2,556 | Joniston Bangkuai (GRS–PBS) |
| P170 | Tuaran | N15 | Kiulu | Joniston Bangkuai | GRS–PBS | 4,316 | Dusi Gingging | PKS | 56 | 2,556 | Joniston Bangkuai (GRS–PBS) |
| P171 | Sepanggar | N16 | Karambunai | Aliakbar Gulasan | PN–PAS | 7,054 | Ahmad Jais Otong | WARISAN | 6,689 | 365 | Yakubah Khan (BN–UMNO) |
| P171 | Sepanggar | N16 | Karambunai | Aliakbar Gulasan | PN–PAS | 7,054 | Arshad Idris | GRS–GAGASAN | 4,818 | 365 | Yakubah Khan (BN–UMNO) |
| P171 | Sepanggar | N16 | Karambunai | Aliakbar Gulasan | PN–PAS | 7,054 | Yakubah Khan | BN–UMNO | 4,475 | 365 | Yakubah Khan (BN–UMNO) |
| P171 | Sepanggar | N16 | Karambunai | Aliakbar Gulasan | PN–PAS | 7,054 | Stephen Teo | STAR | 2,010 | 365 | Yakubah Khan (BN–UMNO) |
| P171 | Sepanggar | N16 | Karambunai | Aliakbar Gulasan | PN–PAS | 7,054 | Adis Jalie | PIS | 162 | 365 | Yakubah Khan (BN–UMNO) |
| P171 | Sepanggar | N16 | Karambunai | Aliakbar Gulasan | PN–PAS | 7,054 | Ajis @ Hate Abdul | SPP | 150 | 365 | Yakubah Khan (BN–UMNO) |
| P171 | Sepanggar | N16 | Karambunai | Aliakbar Gulasan | PN–PAS | 7,054 | Mohd Yunus Ibrahim | PBK | 127 | 365 | Yakubah Khan (BN–UMNO) |
| P171 | Sepanggar | N16 | Karambunai | Aliakbar Gulasan | PN–PAS | 7,054 | Azman Fathil | GAS | 73 | 365 | Yakubah Khan (BN–UMNO) |
| P171 | Sepanggar | N16 | Karambunai | Aliakbar Gulasan | PN–PAS | 7,054 | Raynold Saikam Salinggou | Perpaduan | 73 | 365 | Yakubah Khan (BN–UMNO) |
| P171 | Sepanggar | N16 | Karambunai | Aliakbar Gulasan | PN–PAS | 7,054 | Matkri Kassim | PKS | 45 | 365 | Yakubah Khan (BN–UMNO) |
| P171 | Sepanggar | N17 | Darau | Azhar Matussin | WARISAN | 8,360 | Razali Razi @ Bob | GRS–GAGASAN | 8,297 | 63 | Azhar Matussin (WARISAN) |
| P171 | Sepanggar | N17 | Darau | Azhar Matussin | WARISAN | 8,360 | Joe Arfan @ Arfanshah Abdul Gafar | BN–UMNO | 2,394 | 63 | Azhar Matussin (WARISAN) |
| P171 | Sepanggar | N17 | Darau | Azhar Matussin | WARISAN | 8,360 | Nabila Norsahar | PN–BERSATU | 1,076 | 63 | Azhar Matussin (WARISAN) |
| P171 | Sepanggar | N17 | Darau | Azhar Matussin | WARISAN | 8,360 | Nordin Thani | KDM | 553 | 63 | Azhar Matussin (WARISAN) |
| P171 | Sepanggar | N17 | Darau | Azhar Matussin | WARISAN | 8,360 | Merlah Osman | PIS | 253 | 63 | Azhar Matussin (WARISAN) |
| P171 | Sepanggar | N18 | Inanam | Edna Jessica Majimbun | WARISAN | 9,441 | Roland Chia Ming Shen | IND | 6,489 | 2,952 | Peto Galim (PH–PKR) |
| P171 | Sepanggar | N18 | Inanam | Edna Jessica Majimbun | WARISAN | 9,441 | Peto Galim | PH–PKR | 4,748 | 2,952 | Peto Galim (PH–PKR) |
| P171 | Sepanggar | N18 | Inanam | Edna Jessica Majimbun | WARISAN | 9,441 | Kenny Chua Teck Ho | STAR | 3,641 | 2,952 | Peto Galim (PH–PKR) |
| P171 | Sepanggar | N18 | Inanam | Edna Jessica Majimbun | WARISAN | 9,441 | Wong Thien Fook | UPKO | 1,639 | 2,952 | Peto Galim (PH–PKR) |
| P171 | Sepanggar | N18 | Inanam | Edna Jessica Majimbun | WARISAN | 9,441 | Lewis Wong | KDM | 561 | 2,952 | Peto Galim (PH–PKR) |
| P171 | Sepanggar | N18 | Inanam | Edna Jessica Majimbun | WARISAN | 9,441 | Chia Yun Kong | PR | 460 | 2,952 | Peto Galim (PH–PKR) |
| P171 | Sepanggar | N18 | Inanam | Edna Jessica Majimbun | WARISAN | 9,441 | Shone Eric Jr. Majimbun | IND | 421 | 2,952 | Peto Galim (PH–PKR) |
| P171 | Sepanggar | N18 | Inanam | Edna Jessica Majimbun | WARISAN | 9,441 | Sumali @ Marino Ahmad | RUMPUN | 303 | 2,952 | Peto Galim (PH–PKR) |
| P171 | Sepanggar | N18 | Inanam | Edna Jessica Majimbun | WARISAN | 9,441 | Paul Anap | PIS | 210 | 2,952 | Peto Galim (PH–PKR) |
| P171 | Sepanggar | N18 | Inanam | Edna Jessica Majimbun | WARISAN | 9,441 | Martin Sibit | GAS | 149 | 2,952 | Peto Galim (PH–PKR) |
| P171 | Sepanggar | N18 | Inanam | Edna Jessica Majimbun | WARISAN | 9,441 | Gordon Lai Han Yung | PBK | 68 | 2,952 | Peto Galim (PH–PKR) |
| P171 | Sepanggar | N18 | Inanam | Edna Jessica Majimbun | WARISAN | 9,441 | Joseph Linggian @ Joseph Chong | ANAKNEGERI | 33 | 2,952 | Peto Galim (PH–PKR) |
| P172 | Kota Kinabalu | N19 | Likas | Tham Yun Fook | WARISAN | 9,441 | Phoong Jin Zhe | PH–DAP | 3,343 | 2,425 | Tan Lee Fatt (PH–DAP) |
| P172 | Kota Kinabalu | N19 | Likas | Tham Yun Fook | WARISAN | 9,441 | Yong Yit Jee | SAPP | 837 | 2,425 | Tan Lee Fatt (PH–DAP) |
| P172 | Kota Kinabalu | N19 | Likas | Tham Yun Fook | WARISAN | 9,441 | Yong Yin Loong @ Louis Yong | PIS | 209 | 2,425 | Tan Lee Fatt (PH–DAP) |
| P172 | Kota Kinabalu | N19 | Likas | Tham Yun Fook | WARISAN | 9,441 | Candy Chiew | PBK | 44 | 2,425 | Tan Lee Fatt (PH–DAP) |
| P172 | Kota Kinabalu | N19 | Likas | Tham Yun Fook | WARISAN | 9,441 | Ku Yuk Cheong | PKS | 42 | 2,425 | Tan Lee Fatt (PH–DAP) |
| P172 | Kota Kinabalu | N20 | Api-Api | Loi Kok Liang | WARISAN | 6,061 | Thonny Chee | PH–PKR | 2,996 | 3,065 | Christina Liew (PH–PKR) |
| P172 | Kota Kinabalu | N20 | Api-Api | Loi Kok Liang | WARISAN | 6,061 | Ting Shu Kiong | STAR | 598 | 3,065 | Christina Liew (PH–PKR) |
| P172 | Kota Kinabalu | N20 | Api-Api | Loi Kok Liang | WARISAN | 6,061 | Ng Chun Sua @ Candrix | PIS | 336 | 3,065 | Christina Liew (PH–PKR) |
| P172 | Kota Kinabalu | N20 | Api-Api | Loi Kok Liang | WARISAN | 6,061 | Soh Kee Suat @ So Chee Say | PBK | 137 | 3,065 | Christina Liew (PH–PKR) |
| P172 | Kota Kinabalu | N21 | Luyang | Loi Kok Liang | WARISAN | 11,942 | Chan Loong Wei | PH–DAP | 5,243 | 6,699 | Phoong Jin Zhe (PH–DAP) |
| P172 | Kota Kinabalu | N21 | Luyang | Loi Kok Liang | WARISAN | 11,942 | Gee Tien Siong | SAPP | 1,621 | 6,699 | Phoong Jin Zhe (PH–DAP) |
| P172 | Kota Kinabalu | N21 | Luyang | Loi Kok Liang | WARISAN | 11,942 | Paul Chong | PIS | 412 | 6,699 | Phoong Jin Zhe (PH–DAP) |
| P172 | Kota Kinabalu | N21 | Luyang | Loi Kok Liang | WARISAN | 11,942 | William Ooi Hong Wee | PN–GERAKAN | 285 | 6,699 | Phoong Jin Zhe (PH–DAP) |
| P173 | Putatan | N22 | Tanjung Aru | Junz Wong | WARISAN | 6,120 | Chan Foong Hin | PH–DAP | 2,532 | 3,588 | Junz Wong (WARISAN) |
| P173 | Putatan | N22 | Tanjung Aru | Junz Wong | WARISAN | 6,120 | Ritchie Jay Cheng | IND | 1,164 | 3,588 | Junz Wong (WARISAN) |
| P173 | Putatan | N22 | Tanjung Aru | Junz Wong | WARISAN | 6,120 | Dennison R Indang | UPKO | 1,046 | 3,588 | Junz Wong (WARISAN) |
| P173 | Putatan | N22 | Tanjung Aru | Junz Wong | WARISAN | 6,120 | Suhaimi Buang | PN–BERSATU | 740 | 3,588 | Junz Wong (WARISAN) |
| P173 | Putatan | N22 | Tanjung Aru | Junz Wong | WARISAN | 6,120 | Mohamed Zaim Ansawi | IND | 494 | 3,588 | Junz Wong (WARISAN) |
| P173 | Putatan | N22 | Tanjung Aru | Junz Wong | WARISAN | 6,120 | Loh Ee Eng | PBK | 346 | 3,588 | Junz Wong (WARISAN) |
| P173 | Putatan | N22 | Tanjung Aru | Junz Wong | WARISAN | 6,120 | Hiew Choon Yu | STAR | 249 | 3,588 | Junz Wong (WARISAN) |
| P173 | Putatan | N22 | Tanjung Aru | Junz Wong | WARISAN | 6,120 | Yee Wee Ping | PIS | 144 | 3,588 | Junz Wong (WARISAN) |
| P173 | Putatan | N23 | Petagas | Awang Ahmad Sah | IND | 4,271 | Awang Husaini Sahari | PH–PKR | 3,016 | 1,255 | Awang Ahmad Sah (GRS–GAGASAN) |
| P173 | Putatan | N23 | Petagas | Awang Ahmad Sah | IND | 4,271 | Uda Sulai | WARISAN | 2,912 | 1,255 | Awang Ahmad Sah (GRS–GAGASAN) |
| P173 | Putatan | N23 | Petagas | Awang Ahmad Sah | IND | 4,271 | Lee Nyuk Soon @ Jason Lee | UPKO | 1,306 | 1,255 | Awang Ahmad Sah (GRS–GAGASAN) |
| P173 | Putatan | N23 | Petagas | Awang Ahmad Sah | IND | 4,271 | Afifi Sahif | PN–PAS | 1,283 | 1,255 | Awang Ahmad Sah (GRS–GAGASAN) |
| P173 | Putatan | N23 | Petagas | Awang Ahmad Sah | IND | 4,271 | Annita Sheila F.Among | STAR | 276 | 1,255 | Awang Ahmad Sah (GRS–GAGASAN) |
| P173 | Putatan | N23 | Petagas | Awang Ahmad Sah | IND | 4,271 | Aslin Samat | PIS | 133 | 1,255 | Awang Ahmad Sah (GRS–GAGASAN) |
| P173 | Putatan | N23 | Petagas | Awang Ahmad Sah | IND | 4,271 | Adelaide Cornelius | KDM | 122 | 1,255 | Awang Ahmad Sah (GRS–GAGASAN) |
| P173 | Putatan | N23 | Petagas | Awang Ahmad Sah | IND | 4,271 | Sabrezani Sabdin Ghani | ANAKNEGERI | 40 | 1,255 | Awang Ahmad Sah (GRS–GAGASAN) |
| P173 | Putatan | N23 | Petagas | Awang Ahmad Sah | IND | 4,271 | Patrick Manius | IND | 34 | 1,255 | Awang Ahmad Sah (GRS–GAGASAN) |
| P173 | Putatan | N24 | Tanjung Keramat | Shah Alfie Yahya | GRS–GAGASAN | 5,699 | Jeffrey Nor Mohamed | BN–UMNO | 4,546 | 1,153 | Shahelmey Yahya (BN–UMNO) |
| P173 | Putatan | N24 | Tanjung Keramat | Shah Alfie Yahya | GRS–GAGASAN | 5,699 | Mohammad Firdaus Diun @ Awang | WARISAN | 3,839 | 1,153 | Shahelmey Yahya (BN–UMNO) |
| P173 | Putatan | N24 | Tanjung Keramat | Shah Alfie Yahya | GRS–GAGASAN | 5,699 | Farish Adamz Shah @ Kanny | PN–BERSATU | 1,177 | 1,153 | Shahelmey Yahya (BN–UMNO) |
| P173 | Putatan | N24 | Tanjung Keramat | Shah Alfie Yahya | GRS–GAGASAN | 5,699 | Rosdy Wasli | UPKO | 806 | 1,153 | Shahelmey Yahya (BN–UMNO) |
| P173 | Putatan | N24 | Tanjung Keramat | Shah Alfie Yahya | GRS–GAGASAN | 5,699 | Azni Mohd Salleh | STAR | 479 | 1,153 | Shahelmey Yahya (BN–UMNO) |
| P173 | Putatan | N24 | Tanjung Keramat | Shah Alfie Yahya | GRS–GAGASAN | 5,699 | Sugarah @ Segarah Miasin | KDM | 256 | 1,153 | Shahelmey Yahya (BN–UMNO) |
| P173 | Putatan | N24 | Tanjung Keramat | Shah Alfie Yahya | GRS–GAGASAN | 5,699 | Saifullah Phang | IND | 122 | 1,153 | Shahelmey Yahya (BN–UMNO) |
| P173 | Putatan | N24 | Tanjung Keramat | Shah Alfie Yahya | GRS–GAGASAN | 5,699 | Jasni Matlani | PBK | 122 | 1,153 | Shahelmey Yahya (BN–UMNO) |
| P173 | Putatan | N24 | Tanjung Keramat | Shah Alfie Yahya | GRS–GAGASAN | 5,699 | Mahadthir Asbollah | PIS | 117 | 1,153 | Shahelmey Yahya (BN–UMNO) |
| P173 | Putatan | N24 | Tanjung Keramat | Shah Alfie Yahya | GRS–GAGASAN | 5,699 | Mil Kusin Abdullah | ANAKNEGERI | 29 | 1,153 | Shahelmey Yahya (BN–UMNO) |
| P174 | Penampang | N25 | Kapayan | Chin Tek Ming | WARISAN | 14,597 | Jannie Lasimbang | PH–DAP | 5,341 | 9,256 | Jannie Lasimbang (PH–DAP) |
| P174 | Penampang | N25 | Kapayan | Chin Tek Ming | WARISAN | 14,597 | Billy Joe Dominic | UPKO | 3,496 | 9,256 | Jannie Lasimbang (PH–DAP) |
| P174 | Penampang | N25 | Kapayan | Chin Tek Ming | WARISAN | 14,597 | Bernard A Logijin | STAR | 2,764 | 9,256 | Jannie Lasimbang (PH–DAP) |
| P174 | Penampang | N25 | Kapayan | Chin Tek Ming | WARISAN | 14,597 | Cyril Gerald Liew | IND | 683 | 9,256 | Jannie Lasimbang (PH–DAP) |
| P174 | Penampang | N25 | Kapayan | Chin Tek Ming | WARISAN | 14,597 | Edwin @ Jack Bosi | KDM | 660 | 9,256 | Jannie Lasimbang (PH–DAP) |
| P174 | Penampang | N25 | Kapayan | Chin Tek Ming | WARISAN | 14,597 | Chin Ling Ling | PIS | 487 | 9,256 | Jannie Lasimbang (PH–DAP) |
| P174 | Penampang | N25 | Kapayan | Chin Tek Ming | WARISAN | 14,597 | Sabaria @ Sabariah Aziz | IND | 474 | 9,256 | Jannie Lasimbang (PH–DAP) |
| P174 | Penampang | N25 | Kapayan | Chin Tek Ming | WARISAN | 14,597 | Lasius Miki | PR | 132 | 9,256 | Jannie Lasimbang (PH–DAP) |
| P174 | Penampang | N25 | Kapayan | Chin Tek Ming | WARISAN | 14,597 | Kuo Lee On | PBK | 102 | 9,256 | Jannie Lasimbang (PH–DAP) |
| P174 | Penampang | N25 | Kapayan | Chin Tek Ming | WARISAN | 14,597 | Sylvester Molukun | ASPIRASI | 81 | 9,256 | Jannie Lasimbang (PH–DAP) |
| P174 | Penampang | N25 | Kapayan | Chin Tek Ming | WARISAN | 14,597 | Land Lip Fong | IND | 68 | 9,256 | Jannie Lasimbang (PH–DAP) |
| P174 | Penampang | N25 | Kapayan | Chin Tek Ming | WARISAN | 14,597 | Wong Koon Foh | ANAKNEGERI | 29 | 9,256 | Jannie Lasimbang (PH–DAP) |
| P174 | Penampang | N26 | Moyog | Donald Peter Mojuntin | UPKO | 9,108 | Terrence Siambun @ Alon | WARISAN | 6,490 | 2,618 | Darell Leiking (WARISAN) |
| P174 | Penampang | N26 | Moyog | Donald Peter Mojuntin | UPKO | 9,108 | Joe Suleiman | STAR | 1,805 | 2,618 | Darell Leiking (WARISAN) |
| P174 | Penampang | N26 | Moyog | Donald Peter Mojuntin | UPKO | 9,108 | Joeynodd Bansin | GRS–PBS | 1,620 | 2,618 | Darell Leiking (WARISAN) |
| P174 | Penampang | N26 | Moyog | Donald Peter Mojuntin | UPKO | 9,108 | Remysta Taylor | PH–PKR | 946 | 2,618 | Darell Leiking (WARISAN) |
| P174 | Penampang | N26 | Moyog | Donald Peter Mojuntin | UPKO | 9,108 | McKery Victor Ninin | KDM | 669 | 2,618 | Darell Leiking (WARISAN) |
| P174 | Penampang | N26 | Moyog | Donald Peter Mojuntin | UPKO | 9,108 | Francis Mojikon | PN–BERSATU | 160 | 2,618 | Darell Leiking (WARISAN) |
| P174 | Penampang | N26 | Moyog | Donald Peter Mojuntin | UPKO | 9,108 | Ricky Chang | IND | 110 | 2,618 | Darell Leiking (WARISAN) |
| P174 | Penampang | N26 | Moyog | Donald Peter Mojuntin | UPKO | 9,108 | Richard Ronald Dompok | PKS | 84 | 2,618 | Darell Leiking (WARISAN) |
| P174 | Penampang | N26 | Moyog | Donald Peter Mojuntin | UPKO | 9,108 | Peter Maurice Lidadun | IND | 76 | 2,618 | Darell Leiking (WARISAN) |
| P174 | Penampang | N26 | Moyog | Donald Peter Mojuntin | UPKO | 9,108 | Cleftus Stephen Spine | PIS | 68 | 2,618 | Darell Leiking (WARISAN) |
| P174 | Penampang | N26 | Moyog | Donald Peter Mojuntin | UPKO | 9,108 | Walter Norbert Johnny | PBK | 30 | 2,618 | Darell Leiking (WARISAN) |
| P175 | Papar | N27 | Limbahau | Juil Nuatim | GRS–PBS | 6,444 | Nelson Wences Angang | UPKO | 3,124 | 3,320 | Juil Nuatim (GRS–Direct) |
| P175 | Papar | N27 | Limbahau | Juil Nuatim | GRS–PBS | 6,444 | Roger @ Roy Valentine Amandus | WARISAN | 2,150 | 3,320 | Juil Nuatim (GRS–Direct) |
| P175 | Papar | N27 | Limbahau | Juil Nuatim | GRS–PBS | 6,444 | Edward Dagul | SAPP | 1,585 | 3,320 | Juil Nuatim (GRS–Direct) |
| P175 | Papar | N27 | Limbahau | Juil Nuatim | GRS–PBS | 6,444 | Malik Luman | KDM | 1,007 | 3,320 | Juil Nuatim (GRS–Direct) |
| P175 | Papar | N27 | Limbahau | Juil Nuatim | GRS–PBS | 6,444 | Marcellus Tambud | IND | 257 | 3,320 | Juil Nuatim (GRS–Direct) |
| P175 | Papar | N27 | Limbahau | Juil Nuatim | GRS–PBS | 6,444 | Adrian Alexander Malim | PN–BERSATU | 189 | 3,320 | Juil Nuatim (GRS–Direct) |
| P175 | Papar | N27 | Limbahau | Juil Nuatim | GRS–PBS | 6,444 | Joseph Philip Kurup | PIS | 68 | 3,320 | Juil Nuatim (GRS–Direct) |
| P175 | Papar | N27 | Limbahau | Juil Nuatim | GRS–PBS | 6,444 | Linda Beda Dunstan | IND | 37 | 3,320 | Juil Nuatim (GRS–Direct) |
| P175 | Papar | N28 | Kawang | Ghulamhaidar @ Yusof Khan Bahadar | GRS–GAGASAN | 11,688 | Jamal Nerubi | BN–UMNO | 2,925 | 8,763 | Ghulamhaidar Khan (GRS–GAGASAN) |
| P175 | Papar | N28 | Kawang | Ghulamhaidar @ Yusof Khan Bahadar | GRS–GAGASAN | 11,688 | Nin Jellih | WARISAN | 2,454 | 8,763 | Ghulamhaidar Khan (GRS–GAGASAN) |
| P175 | Papar | N28 | Kawang | Ghulamhaidar @ Yusof Khan Bahadar | GRS–GAGASAN | 11,688 | Beverly Natalie Koh | STAR | 491 | 8,763 | Ghulamhaidar Khan (GRS–GAGASAN) |
| P175 | Papar | N28 | Kawang | Ghulamhaidar @ Yusof Khan Bahadar | GRS–GAGASAN | 11,688 | Samail Bulongik | PIS | 162 | 8,763 | Ghulamhaidar Khan (GRS–GAGASAN) |
| P175 | Papar | N29 | Pantai Manis | Pengiran Saifuddin Pengiran Tahir Petra | GRS–GAGASAN | 8,306 | Redzuan Kupamuthu @ Ismail | BN–UMNO | 4,624 | 2,131 | Mohd Tamin Zainal (BN–UMNO) |
| P175 | Papar | N29 | Pantai Manis | Pengiran Saifuddin Pengiran Tahir Petra | GRS–GAGASAN | 8,306 | Aidi Moktar | WARISAN | 2,531 | 2,131 | Mohd Tamin Zainal (BN–UMNO) |
| P175 | Papar | N29 | Pantai Manis | Pengiran Saifuddin Pengiran Tahir Petra | GRS–GAGASAN | 8,306 | Faizal Julaili | PN–BERSATU | 444 | 2,131 | Mohd Tamin Zainal (BN–UMNO) |
| P175 | Papar | N29 | Pantai Manis | Pengiran Saifuddin Pengiran Tahir Petra | GRS–GAGASAN | 8,306 | Datu Mohamad Datu Tamin | KDM | 239 | 2,131 | Mohd Tamin Zainal (BN–UMNO) |
| P175 | Papar | N29 | Pantai Manis | Pengiran Saifuddin Pengiran Tahir Petra | GRS–GAGASAN | 8,306 | Richard Vitales @ Charles | STAR | 132 | 2,131 | Mohd Tamin Zainal (BN–UMNO) |
| P175 | Papar | N29 | Pantai Manis | Pengiran Saifuddin Pengiran Tahir Petra | GRS–GAGASAN | 8,306 | Mohamad Azzmi Ahmad | PIS | 121 | 2,131 | Mohd Tamin Zainal (BN–UMNO) |
| P176 | Kimanis | N30 | Bongawan | Daud Yusof | WARISAN | 5,542 | Anifah Aman | GRS–PCS | 4,604 | 938 | Daud Yusof (WARISAN) |
| P176 | Kimanis | N30 | Bongawan | Daud Yusof | WARISAN | 5,542 | Mohamad Alamin | BN–UMNO | 4,569 | 938 | Daud Yusof (WARISAN) |
| P176 | Kimanis | N30 | Bongawan | Daud Yusof | WARISAN | 5,542 | Peter Matinjal | KDM | 1,868 | 938 | Daud Yusof (WARISAN) |
| P176 | Kimanis | N30 | Bongawan | Daud Yusof | WARISAN | 5,542 | Dolores Michael | STAR | 801 | 938 | Daud Yusof (WARISAN) |
| P176 | Kimanis | N30 | Bongawan | Daud Yusof | WARISAN | 5,542 | Ridzuan Firdaus | PN–BERSATU | 465 | 938 | Daud Yusof (WARISAN) |
| P176 | Kimanis | N30 | Bongawan | Daud Yusof | WARISAN | 5,542 | Md Haris Md Tahir | IND | 86 | 938 | Daud Yusof (WARISAN) |
| P176 | Kimanis | N30 | Bongawan | Daud Yusof | WARISAN | 5,542 | Royston Adven | PIS | 76 | 938 | Daud Yusof (WARISAN) |
| P176 | Kimanis | N30 | Bongawan | Daud Yusof | WARISAN | 5,542 | Hussin Dasar | PPRS | 43 | 938 | Daud Yusof (WARISAN) |
| P176 | Kimanis | N31 | Membakut | Mohd Arifin Mohd Arif | GRS–GAGASAN | 5,668 | Rusman Dulamit | BN–UMNO | 3,651 | 2,017 | Mohd Arifin Mohd Arif (GRS–GAGASAN) |
| P176 | Kimanis | N31 | Membakut | Mohd Arifin Mohd Arif | GRS–GAGASAN | 5,668 | Mohamad Said @ Ismail Sait | WARISAN | 2,199 | 2,017 | Mohd Arifin Mohd Arif (GRS–GAGASAN) |
| P176 | Kimanis | N31 | Membakut | Mohd Arifin Mohd Arif | GRS–GAGASAN | 5,668 | Rowindy Lawrence Odong | UPKO | 1,788 | 2,017 | Mohd Arifin Mohd Arif (GRS–GAGASAN) |
| P176 | Kimanis | N31 | Membakut | Mohd Arifin Mohd Arif | GRS–GAGASAN | 5,668 | Adrian Lajim | STAR | 324 | 2,017 | Mohd Arifin Mohd Arif (GRS–GAGASAN) |
| P176 | Kimanis | N31 | Membakut | Mohd Arifin Mohd Arif | GRS–GAGASAN | 5,668 | Yahya Amat | ANAKNEGERI | 278 | 2,017 | Mohd Arifin Mohd Arif (GRS–GAGASAN) |
| P176 | Kimanis | N31 | Membakut | Mohd Arifin Mohd Arif | GRS–GAGASAN | 5,668 | Haslin Wasli | IND | 152 | 2,017 | Mohd Arifin Mohd Arif (GRS–GAGASAN) |
| P176 | Kimanis | N31 | Membakut | Mohd Arifin Mohd Arif | GRS–GAGASAN | 5,668 | Kamal Idris | PIS | 67 | 2,017 | Mohd Arifin Mohd Arif (GRS–GAGASAN) |
| P176 | Kimanis | N31 | Membakut | Mohd Arifin Mohd Arif | GRS–GAGASAN | 5,668 | Kamal Idris | PPRS | 38 | 2,017 | Mohd Arifin Mohd Arif (GRS–GAGASAN) |
| P176 | Kimanis | N31 | Membakut | Mohd Arifin Mohd Arif | GRS–GAGASAN | 5,668 | Suliaman Alladad | PKS | 23 | 2,017 | Mohd Arifin Mohd Arif (GRS–GAGASAN) |
| P177 | Beaufort | N32 | Klias | Isnin Aliasnih | GRS–GAGASAN | 6,078 | Osin Jilon | BN–UMNO | 4,435 | 1,643 | Isnin Aliasnih (GRS–GAGASAN) |
| P177 | Beaufort | N32 | Klias | Isnin Aliasnih | GRS–GAGASAN | 6,078 | Mohd Shaid Othman | WARISAN | 2,808 | 1,643 | Isnin Aliasnih (GRS–GAGASAN) |
| P177 | Beaufort | N32 | Klias | Isnin Aliasnih | GRS–GAGASAN | 6,078 | Mohd Hisyam Hazaril Mohd Azman | PN–BERSATU | 877 | 1,643 | Isnin Aliasnih (GRS–GAGASAN) |
| P177 | Beaufort | N32 | Klias | Isnin Aliasnih | GRS–GAGASAN | 6,078 | Mohd Ariffin Barhim | KDM | 557 | 1,643 | Isnin Aliasnih (GRS–GAGASAN) |
| P177 | Beaufort | N32 | Klias | Isnin Aliasnih | GRS–GAGASAN | 6,078 | Suliaman Alladad | PKS | 178 | 1,643 | Isnin Aliasnih (GRS–GAGASAN) |
| P177 | Beaufort | N32 | Klias | Isnin Aliasnih | GRS–GAGASAN | 6,078 | Matlani Sabli | PIS | 124 | 1,643 | Isnin Aliasnih (GRS–GAGASAN) |
| P177 | Beaufort | N32 | Klias | Isnin Aliasnih | GRS–GAGASAN | 6,078 | Edwin Louis | IND | 70 | 1,643 | Isnin Aliasnih (GRS–GAGASAN) |
| P177 | Beaufort | N32 | Klias | Isnin Aliasnih | GRS–GAGASAN | 6,078 | Kaliwon Edi | PPRS | 66 | 1,643 | Isnin Aliasnih (GRS–GAGASAN) |
| P177 | Beaufort | N33 | Kuala Penyu | Limus Jury | GRS–GAGASAN | 8,306 | Awang Aslee Lakat | BN–UMNO | 4,668 | 3,965 | Limus Jury (GRS–GAGASAN) |
| P177 | Beaufort | N33 | Kuala Penyu | Limus Jury | GRS–GAGASAN | 8,306 | Walther Philip Michael | STAR | 1,346 | 3,965 | Limus Jury (GRS–GAGASAN) |
| P177 | Beaufort | N33 | Kuala Penyu | Limus Jury | GRS–GAGASAN | 8,306 | Monih Epin | WARISAN | 1,199 | 3,965 | Limus Jury (GRS–GAGASAN) |
| P177 | Beaufort | N33 | Kuala Penyu | Limus Jury | GRS–GAGASAN | 8,306 | Jonethan Matheus | PKS | 159 | 3,965 | Limus Jury (GRS–GAGASAN) |
| P177 | Beaufort | N33 | Kuala Penyu | Limus Jury | GRS–GAGASAN | 8,306 | Dini Ginsik @ Annie Ginsik | PIS | 125 | 3,965 | Limus Jury (GRS–GAGASAN) |
| P178 | Sipitang | N34 | Lumadan | Ruslan Muharam | GRS–PBS | 6,078 | Mohd Nazri Abdullah | BN–UMNO | 3,713 | 4,254 | Ruslan Muharam (GRS–PBS) |
| P178 | Sipitang | N34 | Lumadan | Ruslan Muharam | GRS–PBS | 6,078 | Mohd Norhizuan Awang | WARISAN | 2,528 | 4,254 | Ruslan Muharam (GRS–PBS) |
| P178 | Sipitang | N34 | Lumadan | Ruslan Muharam | GRS–PBS | 6,078 | Amit Basrin | STAR | 407 | 4,254 | Ruslan Muharam (GRS–PBS) |
| P178 | Sipitang | N34 | Lumadan | Ruslan Muharam | GRS–PBS | 6,078 | Abdul Jarih Okin | KDM | 335 | 4,254 | Ruslan Muharam (GRS–PBS) |
| P178 | Sipitang | N34 | Lumadan | Ruslan Muharam | GRS–PBS | 6,078 | Jurinah Nasir | PIS | 161 | 4,254 | Ruslan Muharam (GRS–PBS) |
| P178 | Sipitang | N35 | Sindumin | Yusri Pungut | WARISAN | 5,086 | Yamani Hafez Musa | PH–PKR | 4,724 | 362 | Yusof Yacob (GRS–GAGASAN) |
| P178 | Sipitang | N35 | Sindumin | Yusri Pungut | WARISAN | 5,086 | Abdillah Jalaf @ Dila | IND | 2,570 | 362 | Yusof Yacob (GRS–GAGASAN) |
| P178 | Sipitang | N35 | Sindumin | Yusri Pungut | WARISAN | 5,086 | Moktar Matussin | STAR | 1,469 | 362 | Yusof Yacob (GRS–GAGASAN) |
| P178 | Sipitang | N35 | Sindumin | Yusri Pungut | WARISAN | 5,086 | Sani Miasin | KDM | 875 | 362 | Yusof Yacob (GRS–GAGASAN) |
| P178 | Sipitang | N35 | Sindumin | Yusri Pungut | WARISAN | 5,086 | Dayang Syafiqah | PN–BERSATU | 705 | 362 | Yusof Yacob (GRS–GAGASAN) |
| P178 | Sipitang | N35 | Sindumin | Yusri Pungut | WARISAN | 5,086 | Markus Buas | PIS | 293 | 362 | Yusof Yacob (GRS–GAGASAN) |
| P178 | Sipitang | N35 | Sindumin | Yusri Pungut | WARISAN | 5,086 | Wilson Liou | IND | 54 | 362 | Yusof Yacob (GRS–GAGASAN) |
| P178 | Sipitang | N35 | Sindumin | Yusri Pungut | WARISAN | 5,086 | Kanafia Bujang | PKS | 37 | 362 | Yusof Yacob (GRS–GAGASAN) |
| P178 | Sipitang | N35 | Sindumin | Yusri Pungut | WARISAN | 5,086 | Ibrahim Tuah | IND | 30 | 362 | Yusof Yacob (GRS–GAGASAN) |
| P179 | Ranau | N36 | Kundasang | Joachim Gunsalam | GRS–PBS | 4,640 | Jackson Musi | IND | 3,609 | 2,017 | Joachim Gunsalam (GRS–PBS) |
| P179 | Ranau | N36 | Kundasang | Joachim Gunsalam | GRS–PBS | 4,640 | Jattry Abie @ Jeffry Mohd Ali | KDM | 2,833 | 2,017 | Joachim Gunsalam (GRS–PBS) |
| P179 | Ranau | N36 | Kundasang | Joachim Gunsalam | GRS–PBS | 4,640 | Japirin Sahadi | BN–PBRS | 1,877 | 2,017 | Joachim Gunsalam (GRS–PBS) |
| P179 | Ranau | N36 | Kundasang | Joachim Gunsalam | GRS–PBS | 4,640 | Japiril Suhaimin | SAPP | 1,279 | 2,017 | Joachim Gunsalam (GRS–PBS) |
| P179 | Ranau | N36 | Kundasang | Joachim Gunsalam | GRS–PBS | 4,640 | Jeffrey Gopog | WARISAN | 986 | 2,017 | Joachim Gunsalam (GRS–PBS) |
| P179 | Ranau | N36 | Kundasang | Joachim Gunsalam | GRS–PBS | 4,640 | Rogers Tiam | UPKO | 530 | 2,017 | Joachim Gunsalam (GRS–PBS) |
| P179 | Ranau | N36 | Kundasang | Joachim Gunsalam | GRS–PBS | 4,640 | Atong Antong | PN–BERSATU | 154 | 2,017 | Joachim Gunsalam (GRS–PBS) |
| P179 | Ranau | N36 | Kundasang | Joachim Gunsalam | GRS–PBS | 4,640 | Edward Jamkim | PIS | 64 | 2,017 | Joachim Gunsalam (GRS–PBS) |
| P179 | Ranau | N36 | Kundasang | Joachim Gunsalam | GRS–PBS | 4,640 | Nazarul Khaiwala Wahab | ANAKNEGERI | 44 | 2,017 | Joachim Gunsalam (GRS–PBS) |
| P179 | Ranau | N37 | Karanaan | Masidi Manjun @ Masdi | GRS–GAGASAN | 7,081 | Anuar Ghani Gilong @ Philip | STAR | 1,720 | 5,361 | Masidi Manjun (GRS–GAGASAN) |
| P179 | Ranau | N37 | Karanaan | Masidi Manjun @ Masdi | GRS–GAGASAN | 7,081 | Md. Nadzmin Kamin | BN–UMNO | 1,630 | 5,361 | Masidi Manjun (GRS–GAGASAN) |
| P179 | Ranau | N37 | Karanaan | Masidi Manjun @ Masdi | GRS–GAGASAN | 7,081 | Karim Adam | KDM | 895 | 5,361 | Masidi Manjun (GRS–GAGASAN) |
| P179 | Ranau | N37 | Karanaan | Masidi Manjun @ Masdi | GRS–GAGASAN | 7,081 | Mukinin @ Mazlan Daiman | WARISAN | 860 | 5,361 | Masidi Manjun (GRS–GAGASAN) |
| P179 | Ranau | N37 | Karanaan | Masidi Manjun @ Masdi | GRS–GAGASAN | 7,081 | Georgina George | UPKO | 660 | 5,361 | Masidi Manjun (GRS–GAGASAN) |
| P179 | Ranau | N37 | Karanaan | Masidi Manjun @ Masdi | GRS–GAGASAN | 7,081 | Naomi @ Neomi Francis | IND | 115 | 5,361 | Masidi Manjun (GRS–GAGASAN) |
| P179 | Ranau | N38 | Paginatan | Rusdin Riman | KDM | 5,992 | Abidin Madingkir | GRS–Direct | 5,256 | 736 | Abidin Madingkir (STAR) |
| P179 | Ranau | N38 | Paginatan | Rusdin Riman | KDM | 5,992 | Jemadi @ Junaidi Sahat | BN–UMNO | 2,448 | 736 | Abidin Madingkir (STAR) |
| P179 | Ranau | N38 | Paginatan | Rusdin Riman | KDM | 5,992 | Ivan Benedict | IND | 2,140 | 736 | Abidin Madingkir (STAR) |
| P179 | Ranau | N38 | Paginatan | Rusdin Riman | KDM | 5,992 | Feddrin Tuliang | STAR | 1,709 | 736 | Abidin Madingkir (STAR) |
| P179 | Ranau | N38 | Paginatan | Rusdin Riman | KDM | 5,992 | Juhaili Sidek | WARISAN | 541 | 736 | Abidin Madingkir (STAR) |
| P179 | Ranau | N38 | Paginatan | Rusdin Riman | KDM | 5,992 | Rubica Gabayoi | ANAKNEGERI | 92 | 736 | Abidin Madingkir (STAR) |
| P179 | Ranau | N38 | Paginatan | Rusdin Riman | KDM | 5,992 | Vennex Jasmin @ Miki | PBM | 78 | 736 | Abidin Madingkir (STAR) |
| P179 | Ranau | N38 | Paginatan | Rusdin Riman | KDM | 5,992 | Linus Yubod @ Md Haidi Md Badawi | PIS | 55 | 736 | Abidin Madingkir (STAR) |
| P179 | Ranau | N38 | Paginatan | Rusdin Riman | KDM | 5,992 | Bensin @ Binsin Dani | PR | 46 | 736 | Abidin Madingkir (STAR) |
| P180 | Keningau | N39 | Tambunan | Jeffrey Kitingan | STAR | 12,595 | Victor P Paut | GRS–GAGASAN | 5,284 | 7,311 | Jeffrey Kitingan (STAR) |
| P180 | Keningau | N39 | Tambunan | Jeffrey Kitingan | STAR | 12,595 | Bianus Kontong | WARISAN | 738 | 7,311 | Jeffrey Kitingan (STAR) |
| P180 | Keningau | N39 | Tambunan | Jeffrey Kitingan | STAR | 12,595 | Jikol Tagua | KDM | 242 | 7,311 | Jeffrey Kitingan (STAR) |
| P180 | Keningau | N39 | Tambunan | Jeffrey Kitingan | STAR | 12,595 | Dionysia Ginsos | ANAKNEGERI | 151 | 7,311 | Jeffrey Kitingan (STAR) |
| P180 | Keningau | N39 | Tambunan | Jeffrey Kitingan | STAR | 12,595 | Vennex Jasmin @ Miki | PBM | 78 | 7,311 | Jeffrey Kitingan (STAR) |
| P180 | Keningau | N39 | Tambunan | Jeffrey Kitingan | STAR | 12,595 | Kenneth Edwin N. | PIS | 55 | 7,311 | Jeffrey Kitingan (STAR) |
| P180 | Keningau | N40 | Bingkor | Mohd Ishak Ayub | STAR | 9,346 | Rafie Robert | GRS–GAGASAN | 3,919 | 5,427 | Robert Tawik (STAR) |
| P180 | Keningau | N40 | Bingkor | Mohd Ishak Ayub | STAR | 9,346 | Kennedy John Angan | UPKO | 2,728 | 5,427 | Robert Tawik (STAR) |
| P180 | Keningau | N40 | Bingkor | Mohd Ishak Ayub | STAR | 9,346 | Benedict Martin Gunir | WARISAN | 2,541 | 5,427 | Robert Tawik (STAR) |
| P180 | Keningau | N40 | Bingkor | Mohd Ishak Ayub | STAR | 9,346 | Niklos Ongoh | KDM | 803 | 5,427 | Robert Tawik (STAR) |
| P180 | Keningau | N40 | Bingkor | Mohd Ishak Ayub | STAR | 9,346 | Ahamin Salim | IND | 312 | 5,427 | Robert Tawik (STAR) |
| P180 | Keningau | N40 | Bingkor | Mohd Ishak Ayub | STAR | 9,346 | Kenolee Justine | PIS | 84 | 5,427 | Robert Tawik (STAR) |
| P180 | Keningau | N40 | Bingkor | Mohd Ishak Ayub | STAR | 9,346 | Thomas Anggan | PKS | 83 | 5,427 | Robert Tawik (STAR) |
| P180 | Keningau | N40 | Bingkor | Mohd Ishak Ayub | STAR | 9,346 | Haryady Antutu | GAS | 71 | 5,427 | Robert Tawik (STAR) |
| P180 | Keningau | N40 | Bingkor | Mohd Ishak Ayub | STAR | 9,346 | Solzah Suah | SPP | 60 | 5,427 | Robert Tawik (STAR) |
| P180 | Keningau | N41 | Liawan | Nik Mohd Nadzri Nik Zawawi | BN–UMNO | 5,542 | Anuar Ayub @ Banand | GRS–Direct | 4,604 | 938 | Annuar Ayub Aman (STAR) |
| P180 | Keningau | N41 | Liawan | Nik Mohd Nadzri Nik Zawawi | BN–UMNO | 5,542 | Adzhar Jasni @ Eddy | WARISAN | 4,142 | 938 | Annuar Ayub Aman (STAR) |
| P180 | Keningau | N41 | Liawan | Nik Mohd Nadzri Nik Zawawi | BN–UMNO | 5,542 | Augustine A.Nain | STAR | 3,899 | 938 | Annuar Ayub Aman (STAR) |
| P180 | Keningau | N41 | Liawan | Nik Mohd Nadzri Nik Zawawi | BN–UMNO | 5,542 | Wilson Gan | UPKO | 658 | 938 | Annuar Ayub Aman (STAR) |
| P180 | Keningau | N41 | Liawan | Nik Mohd Nadzri Nik Zawawi | BN–UMNO | 5,542 | Peter Paun | KDM | 501 | 938 | Annuar Ayub Aman (STAR) |
| P180 | Keningau | N41 | Liawan | Nik Mohd Nadzri Nik Zawawi | BN–UMNO | 5,542 | Johny Anthony | PN–BERSATU | 272 | 938 | Annuar Ayub Aman (STAR) |
| P180 | Keningau | N41 | Liawan | Nik Mohd Nadzri Nik Zawawi | BN–UMNO | 5,542 | Yukilin Giging | RUMPUN | 78 | 938 | Annuar Ayub Aman (STAR) |
| P180 | Keningau | N41 | Liawan | Nik Mohd Nadzri Nik Zawawi | BN–UMNO | 5,542 | Junadey Ejih @ Egih | PIS | 51 | 938 | Annuar Ayub Aman (STAR) |
| P180 | Keningau | N41 | Liawan | Nik Mohd Nadzri Nik Zawawi | BN–UMNO | 5,542 | Mustazarmie Mustapha | PPRS | 37 | 938 | Annuar Ayub Aman (STAR) |
| P181 | Tenom | N42 | Melalap | Jamawi Ja'afar | PH–PKR | 5,064 | Priscella Peter | KDM | 4,539 | 525 | VAC |
| P181 | Tenom | N42 | Melalap | Jamawi Ja'afar | PH–PKR | 5,064 | Gabriel George Tulas | IND | 2,879 | 525 | VAC |
| P181 | Tenom | N42 | Melalap | Jamawi Ja'afar | PH–PKR | 5,064 | Junik Bajit | UPKO | 1,702 | 525 | VAC |
| P181 | Tenom | N42 | Melalap | Jamawi Ja'afar | PH–PKR | 5,064 | Cheld Lind | WARISAN | 448 | 525 | VAC |
| P181 | Tenom | N42 | Melalap | Jamawi Ja'afar | PH–PKR | 5,064 | Alviana Linus | STAR | 271 | 525 | VAC |
| P181 | Tenom | N42 | Melalap | Jamawi Ja'afar | PH–PKR | 5,064 | Fatimah Ibrahim | IND | 59 | 525 | VAC |
| P181 | Tenom | N42 | Melalap | Jamawi Ja'afar | PH–PKR | 5,064 | Kevin Chong | PIS | 21 | 525 | VAC |
| P181 | Tenom | N43 | Kemabong | Rubin Balang | GRS–GAGASAN | 6,326 | Noorita Sual | PH–DAP | 4,197 | 2,129 | Rubin Balang (GRS–GAGASAN) |
| P181 | Tenom | N43 | Kemabong | Rubin Balang | GRS–GAGASAN | 6,326 | Rahmah Jan Sulaiman Khan | BN–UMNO | 2,877 | 2,129 | Rubin Balang (GRS–GAGASAN) |
| P181 | Tenom | N43 | Kemabong | Rubin Balang | GRS–GAGASAN | 6,326 | Burnley Balang | WARISAN | 1,317 | 2,129 | Rubin Balang (GRS–GAGASAN) |
| P181 | Tenom | N43 | Kemabong | Rubin Balang | GRS–GAGASAN | 6,326 | Yabri Onos | KDM | 720 | 2,129 | Rubin Balang (GRS–GAGASAN) |
| P181 | Tenom | N43 | Kemabong | Rubin Balang | GRS–GAGASAN | 6,326 | Hasmin Azroy Abdullah | STAR | 232 | 2,129 | Rubin Balang (GRS–GAGASAN) |
| P181 | Tenom | N43 | Kemabong | Rubin Balang | GRS–GAGASAN | 6,326 | Petrus Yahya | IND | 103 | 2,129 | Rubin Balang (GRS–GAGASAN) |
| P181 | Tenom | N43 | Kemabong | Rubin Balang | GRS–GAGASAN | 6,326 | Jasini Angkiwan | PIS | 103 | 2,129 | Rubin Balang (GRS–GAGASAN) |
| P181 | Tenom | N43 | Kemabong | Rubin Balang | GRS–GAGASAN | 6,326 | Rassedi Liaron | PPRS | 33 | 2,129 | Rubin Balang (GRS–GAGASAN) |
| P182 | Pensiangan | N44 | Tulid | Jordan Jude Ellron | IND | 3,545 | Evaristus Gungkit | STAR | 2,350 | 1,195 | Flovia Ng (STAR) |
| P182 | Pensiangan | N44 | Tulid | Jordan Jude Ellron | IND | 3,545 | Rufinah Pengeran | PH–PKR | 1,628 | 1,195 | Flovia Ng (STAR) |
| P182 | Pensiangan | N44 | Tulid | Jordan Jude Ellron | IND | 3,545 | Edwin Lamin | IND | 1,236 | 1,195 | Flovia Ng (STAR) |
| P182 | Pensiangan | N44 | Tulid | Jordan Jude Ellron | IND | 3,545 | Lucia Kihing | WARISAN | 855 | 1,195 | Flovia Ng (STAR) |
| P182 | Pensiangan | N44 | Tulid | Jordan Jude Ellron | IND | 3,545 | Suman Yasambun | IND | 699 | 1,195 | Flovia Ng (STAR) |
| P182 | Pensiangan | N44 | Tulid | Jordan Jude Ellron | IND | 3,545 | Mohd Khairil Abdullah | UPKO | 555 | 1,195 | Flovia Ng (STAR) |
| P182 | Pensiangan | N44 | Tulid | Jordan Jude Ellron | IND | 3,545 | Oswald Aisat Igau | KDM | 416 | 1,195 | Flovia Ng (STAR) |
| P182 | Pensiangan | N44 | Tulid | Jordan Jude Ellron | IND | 3,545 | Engah Sintan @ Dahlan Abdullah | IND | 100 | 1,195 | Flovia Ng (STAR) |
| P182 | Pensiangan | N44 | Tulid | Jordan Jude Ellron | IND | 3,545 | Vinson Rusikan | PKS | 93 | 1,195 | Flovia Ng (STAR) |
| P182 | Pensiangan | N44 | Tulid | Jordan Jude Ellron | IND | 3,545 | Rayner Francis Udong | PIS | 69 | 1,195 | Flovia Ng (STAR) |
| P182 | Pensiangan | N44 | Tulid | Jordan Jude Ellron | IND | 3,545 | Jufina Dimis | RUMPUN | 29 | 1,195 | Flovia Ng (STAR) |
| P182 | Pensiangan | N44 | Tulid | Jordan Jude Ellron | IND | 3,545 | Clarence Carter Maraat | IND | 27 | 1,195 | Flovia Ng (STAR) |
| P182 | Pensiangan | N44 | Tulid | Jordan Jude Ellron | IND | 3,545 | Lautis @ Laulis Anggang | IND | 18 | 1,195 | Flovia Ng (STAR) |
| P182 | Pensiangan | N45 | Sook | Arthur Joseph Kurup | BN–PBRS | 5,542 | Ellron Alfred Angin | GRS–Direct | 3,580 | 4,727 | Ellron Alfred Angin (STAR) |
| P182 | Pensiangan | N45 | Sook | Arthur Joseph Kurup | BN–PBRS | 5,542 | Ireneus Pagut @ Jreneus Pagut | STAR | 1,681 | 4,727 | Ellron Alfred Angin (STAR) |
| P182 | Pensiangan | N45 | Sook | Arthur Joseph Kurup | BN–PBRS | 5,542 | Joseph Peter Tinggi | WARISAN | 708 | 4,727 | Ellron Alfred Angin (STAR) |
| P182 | Pensiangan | N45 | Sook | Arthur Joseph Kurup | BN–PBRS | 5,542 | V Chong VIn @ Siau Ho | PIS | 71 | 4,727 | Ellron Alfred Angin (STAR) |
| P182 | Pensiangan | N46 | Nabawan | Abdul Ghani Mohamed Yassin | GRS–GAGASAN | 5,283 | Laiji Ompongoh | BN–UMNO | 3,601 | 1,682 | Abdul Ghani Mohamed Yassin (GRS–GAGASAN) |
| P182 | Pensiangan | N46 | Nabawan | Abdul Ghani Mohamed Yassin | GRS–GAGASAN | 5,283 | Jekerison Kilan | KDM | 2,348 | 1,682 | Abdul Ghani Mohamed Yassin (GRS–GAGASAN) |
| P182 | Pensiangan | N46 | Nabawan | Abdul Ghani Mohamed Yassin | GRS–GAGASAN | 5,283 | Alfian Ahmad Koroh | WARISAN | 1,495 | 1,682 | Abdul Ghani Mohamed Yassin (GRS–GAGASAN) |
| P182 | Pensiangan | N46 | Nabawan | Abdul Ghani Mohamed Yassin | GRS–GAGASAN | 5,283 | Akuang Suan | STAR | 780 | 1,682 | Abdul Ghani Mohamed Yassin (GRS–GAGASAN) |
| P182 | Pensiangan | N46 | Nabawan | Abdul Ghani Mohamed Yassin | GRS–GAGASAN | 5,283 | Rosdy Wasli | UPKO | 438 | 1,682 | Abdul Ghani Mohamed Yassin (GRS–GAGASAN) |
| P182 | Pensiangan | N46 | Nabawan | Abdul Ghani Mohamed Yassin | GRS–GAGASAN | 5,283 | Sayau Tangkap | PN–BERSATU | 187 | 1,682 | Abdul Ghani Mohamed Yassin (GRS–GAGASAN) |
| P182 | Pensiangan | N46 | Nabawan | Abdul Ghani Mohamed Yassin | GRS–GAGASAN | 5,283 | Rejoh Ondoh | PIS | 95 | 1,682 | Abdul Ghani Mohamed Yassin (GRS–GAGASAN) |
| P182 | Pensiangan | N46 | Nabawan | Abdul Ghani Mohamed Yassin | GRS–GAGASAN | 5,283 | Farney Akon | PKS | 22 | 1,682 | Abdul Ghani Mohamed Yassin (GRS–GAGASAN) |
| P183 | Beluran | N47 | Telupid | Jonnybone Kurum | GRS–PBS | 3,868 | Felix Joseph Saang | UPKO | 2,857 | 1,011 | Jonnybone Kurum (GRS–PBS) |
| P183 | Beluran | N47 | Telupid | Jonnybone Kurum | GRS–PBS | 3,868 | Benedict Asmat | BN–UMNO | 1,687 | 1,011 | Jonnybone Kurum (GRS–PBS) |
| P183 | Beluran | N47 | Telupid | Jonnybone Kurum | GRS–PBS | 3,868 | Simah Matusip | WARISAN | 806 | 1,011 | Jonnybone Kurum (GRS–PBS) |
| P183 | Beluran | N47 | Telupid | Jonnybone Kurum | GRS–PBS | 3,868 | Jikmariya Muran | STAR | 345 | 1,011 | Jonnybone Kurum (GRS–PBS) |
| P183 | Beluran | N47 | Telupid | Jonnybone Kurum | GRS–PBS | 3,868 | Michel Alok | PIS | 291 | 1,011 | Jonnybone Kurum (GRS–PBS) |
| P183 | Beluran | N47 | Telupid | Jonnybone Kurum | GRS–PBS | 3,868 | Jamin Jamri | PN–BERSATU | 254 | 1,011 | Jonnybone Kurum (GRS–PBS) |
| P183 | Beluran | N47 | Telupid | Jonnybone Kurum | GRS–PBS | 3,868 | Nilis Joseph | KDM | 125 | 1,011 | Jonnybone Kurum (GRS–PBS) |
| P183 | Beluran | N47 | Telupid | Jonnybone Kurum | GRS–PBS | 3,868 | Pagiros @ Petrus Zabang | PBM | 51 | 1,011 | Jonnybone Kurum (GRS–PBS) |
| P183 | Beluran | N48 | Sugut | James Ratib | GRS–GAGASAN | 6,281 | Ronald Kiandee | PN–BERSATU | 3,498 | 2,131 | James Ratib (GRS–GAGASAN) |
| P183 | Beluran | N48 | Sugut | James Ratib | GRS–GAGASAN | 6,281 | Aspah Abdullah Sani | WARISAN | 1,414 | 2,131 | James Ratib (GRS–GAGASAN) |
| P183 | Beluran | N48 | Sugut | James Ratib | GRS–GAGASAN | 6,281 | Mohammad Arifin Pachuk | BN–UMNO | 922 | 2,131 | James Ratib (GRS–GAGASAN) |
| P183 | Beluran | N48 | Sugut | James Ratib | GRS–GAGASAN | 6,281 | Rosely Lajun | PIS | 220 | 2,131 | James Ratib (GRS–GAGASAN) |
| P183 | Beluran | N48 | Sugut | James Ratib | GRS–GAGASAN | 6,281 | Roger Langgau | IND | 143 | 2,131 | James Ratib (GRS–GAGASAN) |
| P183 | Beluran | N48 | Sugut | James Ratib | GRS–GAGASAN | 6,281 | Hassan Mentiak | PPRS | 85 | 2,131 | James Ratib (GRS–GAGASAN) |
| P183 | Beluran | N49 | Labuk | Samad Jambri | GRS–GAGASAN | 2,885 | Yusoflatif Mustapah | BN–UMNO | 1,906 | 979 | Samad Jambri (GRS–GAGASAN) |
| P183 | Beluran | N49 | Labuk | Samad Jambri | GRS–GAGASAN | 2,885 | Japar Awang | WARISAN | 1,411 | 979 | Samad Jambri (GRS–GAGASAN) |
| P183 | Beluran | N49 | Labuk | Samad Jambri | GRS–GAGASAN | 2,885 | Asmid Nasri | PN–BERSATU | 1,364 | 979 | Samad Jambri (GRS–GAGASAN) |
| P183 | Beluran | N49 | Labuk | Samad Jambri | GRS–GAGASAN | 2,885 | Norfadzlina Ramsah | UPKO | 1,081 | 979 | Samad Jambri (GRS–GAGASAN) |
| P183 | Beluran | N49 | Labuk | Samad Jambri | GRS–GAGASAN | 2,885 | Marx Henry Lim | KDM | 232 | 979 | Samad Jambri (GRS–GAGASAN) |
| P183 | Beluran | N49 | Labuk | Samad Jambri | GRS–GAGASAN | 2,885 | Joseph Emus | PIS | 185 | 979 | Samad Jambri (GRS–GAGASAN) |
| P183 | Beluran | N49 | Labuk | Samad Jambri | GRS–GAGASAN | 2,885 | Nuralizah Lee Abdullah | PPRS | 38 | 979 | Samad Jambri (GRS–GAGASAN) |
| P184 | Libaran | N50 | Gum-Gum | Arunarsin Taib | WARISAN | 4,271 | Yunus Nurdin | PN–BERSATU | 1,894 | 1,103 | Arunarsin Taib (WARISAN) |
| P184 | Libaran | N50 | Gum-Gum | Arunarsin Taib | WARISAN | 4,271 | Abdul Said Pimping | PH–PKR | 1,863 | 1,103 | Arunarsin Taib (WARISAN) |
| P184 | Libaran | N50 | Gum-Gum | Arunarsin Taib | WARISAN | 4,271 | Salzo Asa | IND | 1,802 | 1,103 | Arunarsin Taib (WARISAN) |
| P184 | Libaran | N50 | Gum-Gum | Arunarsin Taib | WARISAN | 4,271 | Peter Jr Naintin | UPKO | 1,568 | 1,103 | Arunarsin Taib (WARISAN) |
| P184 | Libaran | N50 | Gum-Gum | Arunarsin Taib | WARISAN | 4,271 | Yusof Yoda | IND | 693 | 1,103 | Arunarsin Taib (WARISAN) |
| P184 | Libaran | N50 | Gum-Gum | Arunarsin Taib | WARISAN | 4,271 | Asmawi Asa | IND | 321 | 1,103 | Arunarsin Taib (WARISAN) |
| P184 | Libaran | N50 | Gum-Gum | Arunarsin Taib | WARISAN | 4,271 | Esnin Satur | PIS | 205 | 1,103 | Arunarsin Taib (WARISAN) |
| P184 | Libaran | N50 | Gum-Gum | Arunarsin Taib | WARISAN | 4,271 | Fadly Voon @ Wea | IND | 98 | 1,103 | Arunarsin Taib (WARISAN) |
| P184 | Libaran | N51 | Sungai Manila | Hazem Mubarak Musa | GRS–GAGASAN | 4,349 | Zaini Tiksun | BN–UMNO | 3,089 | 1,260 | Mokran Ingkat (BN–UMNO) |
| P184 | Libaran | N51 | Sungai Manila | Hazem Mubarak Musa | GRS–GAGASAN | 4,349 | Sittinara Sakah | WARISAN | 2,863 | 1,260 | Mokran Ingkat (BN–UMNO) |
| P184 | Libaran | N51 | Sungai Manila | Hazem Mubarak Musa | GRS–GAGASAN | 4,349 | Yusri Abu | PN–BERSATU | 811 | 1,260 | Mokran Ingkat (BN–UMNO) |
| P184 | Libaran | N51 | Sungai Manila | Hazem Mubarak Musa | GRS–GAGASAN | 4,349 | Irian Nanang | PIS | 251 | 1,260 | Mokran Ingkat (BN–UMNO) |
| P184 | Libaran | N51 | Sungai Manila | Hazem Mubarak Musa | GRS–GAGASAN | 4,349 | Faizal Wahab | PPRS | 115 | 1,260 | Mokran Ingkat (BN–UMNO) |
| P184 | Libaran | N52 | Sungai Sibuga | Lisa Hassan Alban | WARISAN | 6,619 | Suhaimi Nasir | BN–UMNO | 6,531 | 88 | VAC |
| P184 | Libaran | N52 | Sungai Sibuga | Lisa Hassan Alban | WARISAN | 6,619 | Amir Shah Yaakub | GRS–GAGASAN | 6,493 | 88 | VAC |
| P184 | Libaran | N52 | Sungai Sibuga | Lisa Hassan Alban | WARISAN | 6,619 | Norani Asmatil | PN–BERSATU | 1,662 | 88 | VAC |
| P184 | Libaran | N52 | Sungai Sibuga | Lisa Hassan Alban | WARISAN | 6,619 | Ismail Md Said | PIS | 584 | 88 | VAC |
| P185 | Batu Sapi | N53 | Sekong | Alias Sani | WARISAN | 6,487 | Mohd Zharif Aizat Samsuddin | BN–UMNO | 5,687 | 800 | Alias Sani (WARISAN) |
| P185 | Batu Sapi | N53 | Sekong | Alias Sani | WARISAN | 6,487 | Diana Diego @ Yusrina Sufiana | GRS–USNO | 1,721 | 800 | Alias Sani (WARISAN) |
| P185 | Batu Sapi | N53 | Sekong | Alias Sani | WARISAN | 6,487 | Arifin Asgali | IND | 1,200 | 800 | Alias Sani (WARISAN) |
| P185 | Batu Sapi | N53 | Sekong | Alias Sani | WARISAN | 6,487 | Mohd Fazriee Awang | PN–BERSATU | 725 | 800 | Alias Sani (WARISAN) |
| P185 | Batu Sapi | N53 | Sekong | Alias Sani | WARISAN | 6,487 | Abada Atalad | PIS | 288 | 800 | Alias Sani (WARISAN) |
| P185 | Batu Sapi | N54 | Karamunting | Alex @ Wong Tshun Kee | WARISAN | 4,311 | George Hiew Vun Zin | PH–PKR | 3,635 | 676 | George Hiew Vun Zin (GRS–GAGASAN) |
| P185 | Batu Sapi | N54 | Karamunting | Alex @ Wong Tshun Kee | WARISAN | 4,311 | Chin Kim Hung | BN–MCA | 2,297 | 676 | George Hiew Vun Zin (GRS–GAGASAN) |
| P185 | Batu Sapi | N54 | Karamunting | Alex @ Wong Tshun Kee | WARISAN | 4,311 | Chew Kok Woh | KDM | 948 | 676 | George Hiew Vun Zin (GRS–GAGASAN) |
| P185 | Batu Sapi | N54 | Karamunting | Alex @ Wong Tshun Kee | WARISAN | 4,311 | Soo Ming Soon | PIS | 217 | 676 | George Hiew Vun Zin (GRS–GAGASAN) |
| P186 | Sandakan | N55 | Elopura | Calvin Chong Ket Kiun | WARISAN | 8,603 | Vivian Wong Shir Yee | PH–DAP | 5,228 | 3,375 | Calvin Chong Ket Kiun (WARISAN) |
| P186 | Sandakan | N55 | Elopura | Calvin Chong Ket Kiun | WARISAN | 8,603 | Liau Fui Fui | KDM | 3,211 | 3,375 | Calvin Chong Ket Kiun (WARISAN) |
| P186 | Sandakan | N55 | Elopura | Calvin Chong Ket Kiun | WARISAN | 8,603 | Mohd Firdaus @ Silvester Abdullah | PN–GERAKAN | 867 | 3,375 | Calvin Chong Ket Kiun (WARISAN) |
| P186 | Sandakan | N55 | Elopura | Calvin Chong Ket Kiun | WARISAN | 8,603 | Jeffery Chung Cheong Yung | PIS | 848 | 3,375 | Calvin Chong Ket Kiun (WARISAN) |
| P186 | Sandakan | N55 | Elopura | Calvin Chong Ket Kiun | WARISAN | 8,603 | Lita Tan Abdullah | IND | 251 | 3,375 | Calvin Chong Ket Kiun (WARISAN) |
| P186 | Sandakan | N55 | Elopura | Calvin Chong Ket Kiun | WARISAN | 8,603 | Wong Hon Kong | PPRS | 81 | 3,375 | Calvin Chong Ket Kiun (WARISAN) |
| P186 | Sandakan | N56 | Tanjong Papat | Alex Thien Ching Qiang | WARISAN | 3,254 | Frenkie Poon Ming Fung | KDM | 2,527 | 727 | Frenkie Poon Ming Fung (PH–DAP) |
| P186 | Sandakan | N56 | Tanjong Papat | Alex Thien Ching Qiang | WARISAN | 3,254 | Tang Szu Ching | PH–DAP | 2,241 | 727 | Frenkie Poon Ming Fung (PH–DAP) |
| P186 | Sandakan | N56 | Tanjong Papat | Alex Thien Ching Qiang | WARISAN | 3,254 | Mohd Yunus Apil | PR | 659 | 727 | Frenkie Poon Ming Fung (PH–DAP) |
| P186 | Sandakan | N56 | Tanjong Papat | Alex Thien Ching Qiang | WARISAN | 3,254 | Elvis Koa Wei Yang | PN–GERAKAN | 240 | 727 | Frenkie Poon Ming Fung (PH–DAP) |
| P186 | Sandakan | N56 | Tanjong Papat | Alex Thien Ching Qiang | WARISAN | 3,254 | Jainudin Berahim | PIS | 149 | 727 | Frenkie Poon Ming Fung (PH–DAP) |
| P186 | Sandakan | N56 | Tanjong Papat | Alex Thien Ching Qiang | WARISAN | 3,254 | Sohaimi Ramli | PKS | 96 | 727 | Frenkie Poon Ming Fung (PH–DAP) |
| P186 | Sandakan | N56 | Tanjong Papat | Alex Thien Ching Qiang | WARISAN | 3,254 | Henley Liew Yun Ye | SAPP | 93 | 727 | Frenkie Poon Ming Fung (PH–DAP) |
| P187 | Kinabatangan | N57 | Kuamut | Masiung Banah | GRS–GAGASAN | 4,980 | Mohina Sidom | UPKO | 4,523 | 457 | Jonnybone Kurum (GRS–GAGASAN) |
| P187 | Kinabatangan | N57 | Kuamut | Masiung Banah | GRS–GAGASAN | 4,980 | Norfaizah Chua | WARISAN | 1,694 | 457 | Jonnybone Kurum (GRS–GAGASAN) |
| P187 | Kinabatangan | N57 | Kuamut | Masiung Banah | GRS–GAGASAN | 4,980 | Jevronnie Mandek | STAR | 648 | 457 | Jonnybone Kurum (GRS–GAGASAN) |
| P187 | Kinabatangan | N57 | Kuamut | Masiung Banah | GRS–GAGASAN | 4,980 | Abu Bakar Ellah | KDM | 224 | 457 | Jonnybone Kurum (GRS–GAGASAN) |
| P187 | Kinabatangan | N57 | Kuamut | Masiung Banah | GRS–GAGASAN | 4,980 | Ted Kelvin Sudin | PIS | 224 | 457 | Jonnybone Kurum (GRS–GAGASAN) |
| P187 | Kinabatangan | N57 | Kuamut | Masiung Banah | GRS–GAGASAN | 4,980 | John Sungkiang | PPRS | 107 | 457 | Jonnybone Kurum (GRS–GAGASAN) |
| P187 | Kinabatangan | N57 | Kuamut | Masiung Banah | GRS–GAGASAN | 4,980 | Duin Bintarang | IND | 32 | 457 | Jonnybone Kurum (GRS–GAGASAN) |
| P187 | Kinabatangan | N58 | Lamag | Bung Moktar Radin | BN–UMNO | 3,908 | | IND | 3,755 | 153 | Bung Moktar Radin (BN–UMNO) |
| P187 | Kinabatangan | N58 | Lamag | Bung Moktar Radin | BN–UMNO | 3,908 | Johainizamshah Johari | GRS–GAGASAN | 1,646 | 153 | Bung Moktar Radin (BN–UMNO) |
| P187 | Kinabatangan | N58 | Lamag | Bung Moktar Radin | BN–UMNO | 3,908 | Saifullah Lokman | WARISAN | 372 | 153 | Bung Moktar Radin (BN–UMNO) |
| P187 | Kinabatangan | N58 | Lamag | Bung Moktar Radin | BN–UMNO | 3,908 | Mazlin Madali | PN–BERSATU | 258 | 153 | Bung Moktar Radin (BN–UMNO) |
| P187 | Kinabatangan | N58 | Lamag | Bung Moktar Radin | BN–UMNO | 3,908 | Salahuddin @ Salehuddin Anoi | PIS | 45 | 153 | Bung Moktar Radin (BN–UMNO) |
| P187 | Kinabatangan | N59 | Sukau | Jafry Ariffin | BN–UMNO | 5,143 | Juhari Janan | GRS–GAGASAN | 3,909 | 153 | Jafry Ariffin (BN–UMNO) |
| P187 | Kinabatangan | N59 | Sukau | Jafry Ariffin | BN–UMNO | 5,143 | Azahari Rangon | WARISAN | 1,605 | 153 | Jafry Ariffin (BN–UMNO) |
| P187 | Kinabatangan | N59 | Sukau | Jafry Ariffin | BN–UMNO | 5,143 | Pengiran Petra Pengiran Asri | PN–BERSATU | 381 | 153 | Jafry Ariffin (BN–UMNO) |
| P187 | Kinabatangan | N59 | Sukau | Jafry Ariffin | BN–UMNO | 5,143 | Roslan Madali | PIS | 118 | 153 | Jafry Ariffin (BN–UMNO) |
| P187 | Kinabatangan | N59 | Sukau | Jafry Ariffin | BN–UMNO | 5,143 | Nordin Damit | PR | 54 | 153 | Jafry Ariffin (BN–UMNO) |
| P187 | Kinabatangan | N59 | Sukau | Jafry Ariffin | BN–UMNO | 5,143 | Afiq Anwari | PKS | 48 | 153 | Jafry Ariffin (BN–UMNO) |
| P188 | Lahad Datu | N60 | Tungku | Assaffal P. Alian | WARISAN | 5,739 | Abdul Hakim Gulam Hassan | GRS–GAGASAN | 4,560 | 1,179 | Assaffal P. Alian (WARISAN) |
| P188 | Lahad Datu | N60 | Tungku | Assaffal P. Alian | WARISAN | 5,739 | Saleha Abdul Walid | BN–UMNO | 2,622 | 1,179 | Assaffal P. Alian (WARISAN) |
| P188 | Lahad Datu | N60 | Tungku | Assaffal P. Alian | WARISAN | 5,739 | Suling Isib | STAR | 2,130 | 1,179 | Assaffal P. Alian (WARISAN) |
| P188 | Lahad Datu | N60 | Tungku | Assaffal P. Alian | WARISAN | 5,739 | Hairunnizam Kamsin | PIS | 112 | 1,179 | Assaffal P. Alian (WARISAN) |
| P188 | Lahad Datu | N60 | Tungku | Assaffal P. Alian | WARISAN | 5,739 | Jani Kulmen | PKS | 73 | 1,179 | Assaffal P. Alian (WARISAN) |
| P188 | Lahad Datu | N60 | Tungku | Assaffal P. Alian | WARISAN | 5,739 | Jakaria Nasiran | PPRS | 45 | 1,179 | Assaffal P. Alian (WARISAN) |
| P188 | Lahad Datu | N61 | Segama | Muhammad Abdul Karim | WARISAN | 7,325 | Romansa Lamin | PH–PKR | 3,267 | 4,058 | Mohamaddin Ketapi (BN–UMNO) |
| P188 | Lahad Datu | N61 | Segama | Muhammad Abdul Karim | WARISAN | 7,325 | Yvonne Yong Yit Phung | SAPP | 2,318 | 4,058 | Mohamaddin Ketapi (BN–UMNO) |
| P188 | Lahad Datu | N61 | Segama | Muhammad Abdul Karim | WARISAN | 7,325 | Afif Afiandy Ali | IND | 2,195 | 4,058 | Mohamaddin Ketapi (BN–UMNO) |
| P188 | Lahad Datu | N61 | Segama | Muhammad Abdul Karim | WARISAN | 7,325 | Mohamaddin Ketapi | IND | 1,644 | 4,058 | Mohamaddin Ketapi (BN–UMNO) |
| P188 | Lahad Datu | N61 | Segama | Muhammad Abdul Karim | WARISAN | 7,325 | Ehtisham Ur Rahman Mhaulaha | PIS | 327 | 4,058 | Mohamaddin Ketapi (BN–UMNO) |
| P188 | Lahad Datu | N61 | Segama | Muhammad Abdul Karim | WARISAN | 7,325 | Norman Kasimin | IND | 114 | 4,058 | Mohamaddin Ketapi (BN–UMNO) |
| P188 | Lahad Datu | N62 | Silam | Mohammad Yusof Apdal | WARISAN | 7,116 | Mizma Appehdullah | GRS–GAGASAN | 5,859 | 1,257 | Dumi Pg Masdal (WARISAN) |
| P188 | Lahad Datu | N62 | Silam | Mohammad Yusof Apdal | WARISAN | 7,116 | Sharif Musa Sharif Mabul | BN–UMNO | 1,835 | 1,257 | Dumi Pg Masdal (WARISAN) |
| P188 | Lahad Datu | N62 | Silam | Mohammad Yusof Apdal | WARISAN | 7,116 | Balkis Kalinggan | PN–BERSATU | 636 | 1,257 | Dumi Pg Masdal (WARISAN) |
| P188 | Lahad Datu | N62 | Silam | Mohammad Yusof Apdal | WARISAN | 7,116 | Abdul Halim Sidek Gulam Hassan | PH–PKR | 390 | 1,257 | Dumi Pg Masdal (WARISAN) |
| P188 | Lahad Datu | N62 | Silam | Mohammad Yusof Apdal | WARISAN | 7,116 | Brahim Bisel | PIS | 275 | 1,257 | Dumi Pg Masdal (WARISAN) |
| P188 | Lahad Datu | N62 | Silam | Mohammad Yusof Apdal | WARISAN | 7,116 | Amat Kawoh @ Abd Rahman | IND | 172 | 1,257 | Dumi Pg Masdal (WARISAN) |
| P188 | Lahad Datu | N62 | Silam | Mohammad Yusof Apdal | WARISAN | 7,116 | Mohammad Enriquez | SPP | 99 | 1,257 | Dumi Pg Masdal (WARISAN) |
| P188 | Lahad Datu | N62 | Silam | Mohammad Yusof Apdal | WARISAN | 7,116 | Mohd Syafiq Iqhmal Saharuddin | PKS | 21 | 1,257 | Dumi Pg Masdal (WARISAN) |
| P188 | Lahad Datu | N63 | Kunak | Anil Sandhu | BN–UMNO | 5,986 | Jasa @ Ismail Rauddah | WARISAN | 3,868 | 2,118 | Norazlinah Arif (GRS–GAGASAN) |
| P188 | Lahad Datu | N63 | Kunak | Anil Sandhu | BN–UMNO | 5,986 | Norazlinah Arif | GRS–GAGASAN | 3,347 | 2,118 | Norazlinah Arif (GRS–GAGASAN) |
| P188 | Lahad Datu | N63 | Kunak | Anil Sandhu | BN–UMNO | 5,986 | Kasman Karate | PN–PAS | 898 | 2,118 | Norazlinah Arif (GRS–GAGASAN) |
| P188 | Lahad Datu | N63 | Kunak | Anil Sandhu | BN–UMNO | 5,986 | Ismu Isyam Arsad | PPRS | 188 | 2,118 | Norazlinah Arif (GRS–GAGASAN) |
| P188 | Lahad Datu | N63 | Kunak | Anil Sandhu | BN–UMNO | 5,986 | Roselih Lumayan | PIS | 142 | 2,118 | Norazlinah Arif (GRS–GAGASAN) |
| P189 | Semporna | N64 | Sulabayan | Jaujan Sambakong | WARISAN | 8,603 | Zulfikar Ab Mijan | PH–AMANAH | 1,405 | 5,913 | Jaujan Sambakong (WARISAN) |
| P189 | Semporna | N64 | Sulabayan | Jaujan Sambakong | WARISAN | 8,603 | Bidin Jawa | STAR | 357 | 5,913 | Jaujan Sambakong (WARISAN) |
| P189 | Semporna | N64 | Sulabayan | Jaujan Sambakong | WARISAN | 8,603 | Abd Malik Abd Bool | PN–BERSATU | 231 | 5,913 | Jaujan Sambakong (WARISAN) |
| P189 | Semporna | N64 | Sulabayan | Jaujan Sambakong | WARISAN | 8,603 | Abdillah Abd Hamid | IND | 223 | 5,913 | Jaujan Sambakong (WARISAN) |
| P189 | Semporna | N64 | Sulabayan | Jaujan Sambakong | WARISAN | 8,603 | Mat Roya Jaafar | PIS | 137 | 5,913 | Jaujan Sambakong (WARISAN) |
| P189 | Semporna | N64 | Sulabayan | Jaujan Sambakong | WARISAN | 8,603 | Hasaman Sangaran | ANAKNEGERI | 82 | 5,913 | Jaujan Sambakong (WARISAN) |
| P189 | Semporna | N64 | Sulabayan | Jaujan Sambakong | WARISAN | 8,603 | Sumini Yasintus | PPRS | 43 | 5,913 | Jaujan Sambakong (WARISAN) |
| P189 | Semporna | N65 | Senallang | Shafie Apdal | WARISAN | 8,751 | Marunda K K Ampong | GRS–GAGASAN | 5,859 | 1,257 | Shafie Apdal (WARISAN) |
| P189 | Semporna | N65 | Senallang | Shafie Apdal | WARISAN | 8,751 | Mohd Lipai @ Samsu Sundalu | PIS | 196 | 1,257 | Shafie Apdal (WARISAN) |
| P189 | Semporna | N65 | Senallang | Shafie Apdal | WARISAN | 8,751 | Abdul Majid Angkulan | MUPP | 131 | 1,257 | Shafie Apdal (WARISAN) |
| P189 | Semporna | N66 | Bugaya | Jamil Hamzah | WARISAN | 13,414 | Noorudin Abdul Hussin | GRS–GAGASAN | 3,368 | 10,046 | Jaujan Sambakong (WARISAN) |
| P189 | Semporna | N66 | Bugaya | Jamil Hamzah | WARISAN | 13,414 | Abdulmanan Indanan | BN–UMNO | 1,794 | 10,046 | Jaujan Sambakong (WARISAN) |
| P189 | Semporna | N66 | Bugaya | Jamil Hamzah | WARISAN | 13,414 | Jamil Abd Gapar | PN–BERSATU | 450 | 10,046 | Jaujan Sambakong (WARISAN) |
| P189 | Semporna | N66 | Bugaya | Jamil Hamzah | WARISAN | 13,414 | Mohd Tara Mohd Dawa | STAR | 333 | 10,046 | Jaujan Sambakong (WARISAN) |
| P189 | Semporna | N66 | Bugaya | Jamil Hamzah | WARISAN | 13,414 | Suffian Ahmad | RUMPUN | 205 | 10,046 | Jaujan Sambakong (WARISAN) |
| P189 | Semporna | N66 | Bugaya | Jamil Hamzah | WARISAN | 13,414 | Arman Marasal | PIS | 181 | 10,046 | Jaujan Sambakong (WARISAN) |
| P189 | Semporna | N66 | Bugaya | Jamil Hamzah | WARISAN | 13,414 | Roslan Ali | PR | 63 | 10,046 | Jaujan Sambakong (WARISAN) |
| P189 | Semporna | N66 | Bugaya | Jamil Hamzah | WARISAN | 13,414 | Maulana Unding | ASPIRASI | 30 | 10,046 | Jaujan Sambakong (WARISAN) |
| P190 | Tawau | N67 | Balung | Hamid Awang | GRS–GAGASAN | 4,717 | Ahmad Frank Salazar | WARISAN | 3,372 | 1,345 | Hamid Awang (GRS–GAGASAN) |
| P190 | Tawau | N67 | Balung | Hamid Awang | GRS–GAGASAN | 4,717 | Munzier Mahamud | PN–PAS | 2,265 | 1,345 | Hamid Awang (GRS–GAGASAN) |
| P190 | Tawau | N67 | Balung | Hamid Awang | GRS–GAGASAN | 4,717 | Erwan Palette | BN–UMNO | 1,688 | 1,345 | Hamid Awang (GRS–GAGASAN) |
| P190 | Tawau | N67 | Balung | Hamid Awang | GRS–GAGASAN | 4,717 | Chee Kheng Moi | STAR | 373 | 1,345 | Hamid Awang (GRS–GAGASAN) |
| P190 | Tawau | N67 | Balung | Hamid Awang | GRS–GAGASAN | 4,717 | Shafie Hassan | IND | 218 | 1,345 | Hamid Awang (GRS–GAGASAN) |
| P190 | Tawau | N67 | Balung | Hamid Awang | GRS–GAGASAN | 4,717 | Norazizah Palari | RUMPUN | 154 | 1,345 | Hamid Awang (GRS–GAGASAN) |
| P190 | Tawau | N67 | Balung | Hamid Awang | GRS–GAGASAN | 4,717 | Hartono Muhamad Juno | IND | 144 | 1,345 | Hamid Awang (GRS–GAGASAN) |
| P190 | Tawau | N67 | Balung | Hamid Awang | GRS–GAGASAN | 4,717 | Datu Ugis Datu Pula | PIS | 87 | 1,345 | Hamid Awang (GRS–GAGASAN) |
| P190 | Tawau | N67 | Balung | Hamid Awang | GRS–GAGASAN | 4,717 | Rosdiansa Mohd Noor | PPRS | 78 | 1,345 | Hamid Awang (GRS–GAGASAN) |
| P190 | Tawau | N67 | Balung | Hamid Awang | GRS–GAGASAN | 4,717 | Ahmad Awang | PBK | 57 | 1,345 | Hamid Awang (GRS–GAGASAN) |
| P190 | Tawau | N68 | Apas | Nizam Abu Bakar Titingan | GRS–GAGASAN | 4,717 | Sarman Aman Simito | WARISAN | 4,991 | 4,248 | Nizam Abu Bakar Titingan (GRS–GAGASAN) |
| P190 | Tawau | N68 | Apas | Nizam Abu Bakar Titingan | GRS–GAGASAN | 4,717 | Elmiariezan Ardan | BN–UMNO | 2,151 | 4,248 | Nizam Abu Bakar Titingan (GRS–GAGASAN) |
| P190 | Tawau | N68 | Apas | Nizam Abu Bakar Titingan | GRS–GAGASAN | 4,717 | Lim Ting Khai | PN–BERSATU | 1,940 | 4,248 | Nizam Abu Bakar Titingan (GRS–GAGASAN) |
| P190 | Tawau | N68 | Apas | Nizam Abu Bakar Titingan | GRS–GAGASAN | 4,717 | Herman Amdas | PIS | 177 | 4,248 | Nizam Abu Bakar Titingan (GRS–GAGASAN) |
| P190 | Tawau | N68 | Apas | Nizam Abu Bakar Titingan | GRS–GAGASAN | 4,717 | Marsiah Omat | PPRS | 105 | 4,248 | Nizam Abu Bakar Titingan (GRS–GAGASAN) |
| P190 | Tawau | N69 | Sri Tanjong | Justin Wong Yung Bin | WARISAN | 9,774 | Philip Yap Wui Lip | PH–PKR | 6,661 | 3,113 | Justin Wong Yung Bin (WARISAN) |
| P190 | Tawau | N69 | Sri Tanjong | Justin Wong Yung Bin | WARISAN | 9,774 | Fung Len Fui | STAR | 3,641 | 3,113 | Justin Wong Yung Bin (WARISAN) |
| P190 | Tawau | N69 | Sri Tanjong | Justin Wong Yung Bin | WARISAN | 9,774 | Joseph Mosusah | PIS | 412 | 3,113 | Justin Wong Yung Bin (WARISAN) |
| P190 | Tawau | N69 | Sri Tanjong | Justin Wong Yung Bin | WARISAN | 9,774 | Wong Su Vui | IND | 306 | 3,113 | Justin Wong Yung Bin (WARISAN) |
| P190 | Tawau | N69 | Sri Tanjong | Justin Wong Yung Bin | WARISAN | 9,774 | Ricky Hong Chee Kiong | KDM | 298 | 3,113 | Justin Wong Yung Bin (WARISAN) |
| P191 | Kalabakan | N70 | Kukusan | Rina Jainal | IND | 3,490 | Ma'mun Sulaiman | WARISAN | 2,840 | 880 | Rina Jainal (GRS–PHRS) |
| P191 | Kalabakan | N70 | Kukusan | Rina Jainal | IND | 3,490 | Samsiah Usman | GRS–PHRS | 2,063 | 880 | Rina Jainal (GRS–PHRS) |
| P191 | Kalabakan | N70 | Kukusan | Rina Jainal | IND | 3,490 | Chaya Sulaiman | BN–UMNO | 1,588 | 880 | Rina Jainal (GRS–PHRS) |
| P191 | Kalabakan | N70 | Kukusan | Rina Jainal | IND | 3,490 | Francis Lawrence @ Usop | PN–BERSATU | 725 | 880 | Rina Jainal (GRS–PHRS) |
| P191 | Kalabakan | N70 | Kukusan | Rina Jainal | IND | 3,490 | Rahman Yahya | STAR | 125 | 880 | Rina Jainal (GRS–PHRS) |
| P191 | Kalabakan | N70 | Kukusan | Rina Jainal | IND | 3,490 | Hairul Amin @ Kenon | Independent | 119 | 880 | Rina Jainal (GRS–PHRS) |
| P191 | Kalabakan | N70 | Kukusan | Rina Jainal | IND | 3,490 | Razik Muyong | PIS | 45 | 880 | Rina Jainal (GRS–PHRS) |
| P191 | Kalabakan | N70 | Kukusan | Rina Jainal | IND | 3,490 | Ishak Ismail | PPRS | 39 | 880 | Rina Jainal (GRS–PHRS) |
| P191 | Kalabakan | N70 | Kukusan | Rina Jainal | IND | 3,490 | Mariani Sulaiman | ANAKNEGERI | 25 | 880 | Rina Jainal (GRS–PHRS) |
| P191 | Kalabakan | N71 | Tanjong Batu | Andi Md Shamsureezal Mohd Sainal | GRS–GAGASAN | 5,492 | Samasuddin Yusop @ SBY | BN–UMNO | 4,511 | 981 | Andi Muhammad Suryandy Bandy (BN–UMNO) |
| P191 | Kalabakan | N71 | Tanjong Batu | Andi Md Shamsureezal Mohd Sainal | GRS–GAGASAN | 5,492 | Ayuf Abd Rahman | WARISAN | 3,228 | 981 | Andi Muhammad Suryandy Bandy (BN–UMNO) |
| P191 | Kalabakan | N71 | Tanjong Batu | Andi Md Shamsureezal Mohd Sainal | GRS–GAGASAN | 5,492 | Ahmad Dullah | PN–PAS | 2,426 | 981 | Andi Muhammad Suryandy Bandy (BN–UMNO) |
| P191 | Kalabakan | N71 | Tanjong Batu | Andi Md Shamsureezal Mohd Sainal | GRS–GAGASAN | 5,492 | Zanudin Mingo | PIS | 139 | 981 | Andi Muhammad Suryandy Bandy (BN–UMNO) |
| P191 | Kalabakan | N72 | Merotai | Sarifuddin Hata | WARISAN | 8,855 | Ruji Ubi | PH–PKR | 4,839 | 4,016 | Sarifuddin Hata (WARISAN) |
| P191 | Kalabakan | N72 | Merotai | Sarifuddin Hata | WARISAN | 8,855 | Hasan Haris | PN–PAS | 1,288 | 4,016 | Sarifuddin Hata (WARISAN) |
| P191 | Kalabakan | N72 | Merotai | Sarifuddin Hata | WARISAN | 8,855 | Rhyme @ Reymie Kassim | PIS | 231 | 4,016 | Sarifuddin Hata (WARISAN) |
| P191 | Kalabakan | N73 | Sebatik | Manahing Tinggilani @ Tanggilani | WARISAN | 2,795 | Hassan Abdul Gani Pengiran Amir | GRS–GAGASAN | 2,645 | 150 | Hassan A. Gani Pengiran Amir (GRS–GAGASAN) |
| P191 | Kalabakan | N73 | Sebatik | Manahing Tinggilani @ Tanggilani | WARISAN | 2,795 | Aslan Fadli Samsul Alang | BN–UMNO | 1,968 | 150 | Hassan A. Gani Pengiran Amir (GRS–GAGASAN) |
| P191 | Kalabakan | N73 | Sebatik | Manahing Tinggilani @ Tanggilani | WARISAN | 2,795 | Husni Frans | Independent | 1,827 | 150 | Hassan A. Gani Pengiran Amir (GRS–GAGASAN) |
| P191 | Kalabakan | N73 | Sebatik | Manahing Tinggilani @ Tanggilani | WARISAN | 2,795 | Suhurani Sammani | PN–BERSATU | 440 | 150 | Hassan A. Gani Pengiran Amir (GRS–GAGASAN) |
| P191 | Kalabakan | N73 | Sebatik | Manahing Tinggilani @ Tanggilani | WARISAN | 2,795 | Sahran Untai | ANAKNEGERI | 298 | 150 | Hassan A. Gani Pengiran Amir (GRS–GAGASAN) |
| P191 | Kalabakan | N73 | Sebatik | Manahing Tinggilani @ Tanggilani | WARISAN | 2,795 | Kadri Amat | STAR | 266 | 150 | Hassan A. Gani Pengiran Amir (GRS–GAGASAN) |
| P191 | Kalabakan | N73 | Sebatik | Manahing Tinggilani @ Tanggilani | WARISAN | 2,795 | Ismail Idris | RUMPUN | 41 | 150 | Hassan A. Gani Pengiran Amir (GRS–GAGASAN) |
| P191 | Kalabakan | N73 | Sebatik | Manahing Tinggilani @ Tanggilani | WARISAN | 2,795 | Abdul Gaib Aliaman | PIS | 40 | 150 | Hassan A. Gani Pengiran Amir (GRS–GAGASAN) |
| P191 | Kalabakan | N73 | Sebatik | Manahing Tinggilani @ Tanggilani | WARISAN | 2,795 | Abu Bakar Kumun | PPRS | 21 | 150 | Hassan A. Gani Pengiran Amir (GRS–GAGASAN) |
