= Peto Galim =

Malaysian politician

Yang Berhormat Datuk Peto Galim PGDK MLA

State Assistant Minister of Agriculture, Fisheries and Food Industries of Sabah
- Incumbent
- Assumed office 26 January 2023 Serving with Hendrus Anding
- Governor: Juhar Mahiruddin (2023–2024); Musa Aman (since 2025)
- Chief Minister: Hajiji Noor
- State Minister: Jeffrey Kitingan
- Preceded by: James Ratib (State Assistant Minister of Agriculture and Fisheries of Sabah)
- Constituency: Inanam

State Deputy Chairman of the People's Justice Party of Sabah
- Incumbent
- Assumed office 26 May 2024
- President: Anwar Ibrahim
- State Chairman: Mustapha Sakmud

Member of the Sabah State Legislative Assembly for Inanam
- In office 26 September 2020 – 29 November 2025
- Preceded by: Kenny Chua Teck Ho (PH–PKR)
- Succeeded by: Edna Jessica Majimbun (WARISAN)
- Majority: 5,638 (2020)

Personal details
- Born: Peto Galim; 6 November 1966 (age 59) Sabah, Malaysia
- Citizenship: Malaysia
- Party: People's Justice Party (PKR)
- Other political affiliations: Pakatan Harapan (PH)
- Education: Universiti Teknologi MARA
- Occupation: Politician
- Profession: Engineer

Peto Galim is a Malaysian politician and engineer who has served as the State Assistant Minister of Agriculture, Fisheries and Food Industries of Sabah in the Gabungan Rakyat Sabah (GRS) administration under Chief Minister Hajiji Noor and Minister Jeffrey Kitingan since January 2023 and Member of the Sabah State Legislative Assembly (MLA) for Inanam since September 2020. He is a member of the People's Justice Party (PKR), a component party of the Pakatan Harapan (PH) coalition. He has served as the State Deputy Chairman of PKR of Sabah since May 2024 and Division Chief of PKR of Sepanggar since July 2022.

== Election result ==
Sabah State Legislative Assembly
Year	Constituency	Candidate	Votes	Pct.	Opponent(s)	Votes	Pct.	Ballots cast	Majority	Turnout
2020	N18 Inanam	Peto Galim (PKR)	8,586	49.67%	William Majinbon (PBS)	2,948	17.05%	17,286	5,638	66.40%
2020	N18 Inanam	Peto Galim (PKR)	8,586	49.67%	Kenny Chua Teck Ho (IND)	2,346	13.57%	17,286	5,638	66.40%
2020	N18 Inanam	Peto Galim (PKR)	8,586	49.67%	Chong Kah Kiat (LDP)	1,606	9.29%	17,286	5,638	66.40%
2020	N18 Inanam	Peto Galim (PKR)	8,586	49.67%	Goh Fah Shun (GAGASAN)	362	2.09%	17,286	5,638	66.40%
2020	N18 Inanam	Peto Galim (PKR)	8,586	49.67%	Regina Lim (PCS)	291	1.68%	17,286	5,638	66.40%
2020	N18 Inanam	Peto Galim (PKR)	8,586	49.67%	Achmad Noorasyrul Noortaip (IND)	286	1.65%	17,286	5,638	66.40%
2020	N18 Inanam	Peto Galim (PKR)	8,586	49.67%	Terence Tsen Kim Fatt (ANAK NEGERI)	255	1.48%	17,286	5,638	66.40%
2020	N18 Inanam	Peto Galim (PKR)	8,586	49.67%	Mohd Hary Abdullah (USNO Baru)	156	0.90%	17,286	5,638	66.40%
2020	N18 Inanam	Peto Galim (PKR)	8,586	49.67%	George Ngui (IND)	54	0.31%	17,286	5,638	66.40%
2025	N18 Inanam	Peto Galim (PKR)		%	Edna Majimbun (WARISAN)		%			
2025	N18 Inanam	Peto Galim (PKR)		%	Wong Thien Fook (UPKO)		%			
2025	N18 Inanam	Peto Galim (PKR)		%	Lewis Wong (KDM)		%			
2025	N18 Inanam	Peto Galim (PKR)		%	Kenny Chua Teck Ho (STAR)		%			
2025	N18 Inanam	Peto Galim (PKR)		%	Paul Anap (IMPIAN)		%			
2025	N18 Inanam	Peto Galim (PKR)		%	Joseph Linggian @ Joseph Chong (ANAK NEGERI)		%			
2025	N18 Inanam	Peto Galim (PKR)		%	Gordon Lai Han Yung (PBK)		%			
2025	N18 Inanam	Peto Galim (PKR)		%	Sumali @ Marino Ahmad (RUMPUN)		%			
2025	N18 Inanam	Peto Galim (PKR)		%	Chia Yun Kong (PR)		%			
2025	N18 Inanam	Peto Galim (PKR)		%	Martin Sibit (GAS)		%			
2025	N18 Inanam	Peto Galim (PKR)		%	Shone Majimbun (IND)		%			
2025	N18 Inanam	Peto Galim (PKR)		%	Roland Chia Ming Shen (IND)		%			

== Honours ==
- Sabah
  - Commander of the Order of Kinabalu (PGDK) – Datuk (2024)
