= Kenny Chua Teck Ho =

Malaysian politician

Yang Berbahagia Datuk Kenny Chua Teck Ho PGDK
- 蔡德和

State Assistant Minister of Finance of Sabah
- In office 16 May 2018 – 30 July 2020 Serving with Sarifuddin Hata
- Governor: Juhar Mahiruddin
- Chief Minister: Shafie Apdal
- Minister: Shafie Apdal
- Preceded by: Michael Asang
- Succeeded by: Nizam Abu Bakar Titingan
- Constituency: Inanam

Deputy President of the Homeland Solidarity Party (Chinese Quota)
- Incumbent
- Assumed office 23 June 2024 Serving with Ellron Alfred Angin (Non-Muslim Bumiputera) & Robert Tawik (Muslim Bumiputera)
- President: Jeffrey Kitingan
- Preceded by: Fung Len Fui

Member of the Sabah State Legislative Assembly for Inanam
- In office 9 May 2018 – 26 September 2020
- Preceded by: Roland Chia Ming Shen (PR–PKR)
- Succeeded by: Peto Galim (PH–PKR)
- Majority: 7,783 (2018)

Faction represented in the Sabah State Legislative Assembly
- 2018–2020: Pakatan Harapan
- 2020: Independent

Personal details
- Born: Kenny Chua Teck Ho; 19 May 1971 (age 55) Penampang, Sabah, Malaysia
- Citizenship: Malaysian
- Party: People's Justice Party (PKR) (until 2020); Independent (2020); Homeland Solidarity Party (STAR) (since 2020)
- Other political affiliations: Pakatan Harapan (PH) (until 2020); Perikatan Nasional (PN) (2020–2022); Gabungan Rakyat Sabah (GRS) (since 2020)
- Occupation: Politician

Kenny Chua Teck Ho

Chinese name
- Traditional Chinese: 蔡德和
- Simplified Chinese: 蔡德和
Transcriptions
Standard Mandarin
- Hanyu Pinyin: Cài Déhé

Kenny Chua Teck Ho (Chinese: 蔡德和; pinyin: Cài Déhé; born 19 May 1971) is a Malaysian politician who served as State Assistant Minister of Finance of Sabah in the Heritage Party (WARISAN) state administration under former Chief Minister and Minister Shafie Apdal from May 2018 to his resignation in July 2020 and Member of the Sabah State Legislative Assembly (MLA) for Inanam from May 2018 to September 2020. He is a member of the Homeland Solidarity Party (STAR), a component party of the Gabungan Rakyat Sabah (GRS) and formerly Perikatan Nasional (PN) coalitions and was a member of the People's Justice Party (PKR), a component party of the Pakatan Harapan (PH) coalition. He has served as the Deputy President of STAR for the Chinese quota since June 2024.

== Election results ==
Sabah State Legislative Assembly
| Year | Constituency | Candidate | Votes | Pct | Opponent(s) | Votes | Pct | Ballots cast | Majority | Turnout |
|---|---|---|---|---|---|---|---|---|---|---|
| 2018 | N13 Inanam | Kenny Chua Teck Ho (PKR) | 13,633 | 62.34% | Johnny Goh Chin Lok (PBS) | 5,850 | 26.75% | 22,360 | 7,783 | 80.00% |
| 2018 | N13 Inanam | Kenny Chua Teck Ho (PKR) | 13,633 | 62.34% | John Stephen Dionysius (SAPP) | 1,695 | 7.75% | 22,360 | 7,783 | 80.00% |
| 2018 | N13 Inanam | Kenny Chua Teck Ho (PKR) | 13,633 | 62.34% | Terence Tsen Kim Fatt (PKAN) | 480 | 2.19% | 22,360 | 7,783 | 80.00% |
| 2018 | N13 Inanam | Kenny Chua Teck Ho (PKR) | 13,633 | 62.34% | Jakariah Janit (PKS) | 156 | 0.71% | 22,360 | 7,783 | 80.00% |
| 2018 | N13 Inanam | Kenny Chua Teck Ho (PKR) | 13,633 | 62.34% | Situl Mintow (IND) | 57 | 0.26% | 22,360 | 7,783 | 80.00% |
| 2020 | N18 Inanam | Kenny Chua Teck Ho (IND) | 2,346 | 13.89% | Peto Galim (PKR) | 8,586 | 50.92% | 16,890 | 5,638 | 64.87% |
| 2020 | N18 Inanam | Kenny Chua Teck Ho (IND) | 2,346 | 13.89% | William Majinbon (PBS) | 2,948 | 17.38% | 16,890 | 5,638 | 64.87% |
| 2020 | N18 Inanam | Kenny Chua Teck Ho (IND) | 2,346 | 13.89% | Chong Kah Kiat (LDP) | 1,606 | 9.51% | 16,890 | 5,638 | 64.87% |
| 2020 | N18 Inanam | Kenny Chua Teck Ho (IND) | 2,346 | 13.89% | Francis Goh Fah Shun (GAGASAN) | 362 | 2.14% | 16,890 | 5,638 | 64.87% |
| 2020 | N18 Inanam | Kenny Chua Teck Ho (IND) | 2,346 | 13.89% | How Regina Lim (PCS) | 291 | 1.72% | 16,890 | 5,638 | 64.87% |
| 2020 | N18 Inanam | Kenny Chua Teck Ho (IND) | 2,346 | 13.89% | Achmad Noorasyrul Noortaip (IND) | 286 | 1.69% | 16,890 | 5,638 | 64.87% |
| 2020 | N18 Inanam | Kenny Chua Teck Ho (IND) | 2,346 | 13.89% | Terence Tsen Kim Fatt (PKAN) | 255 | 1.51% | 16,890 | 5,638 | 64.87% |
| 2020 | N18 Inanam | Kenny Chua Teck Ho (IND) | 2,346 | 13.89% | Mohd Hardy Abdullah (USNO Baru) | 156 | 0.92% | 16,890 | 5,638 | 64.87% |
| 2020 | N18 Inanam | Kenny Chua Teck Ho (IND) | 2,346 | 13.89% | George Ngui (IND) | 54 | 0.32% | 16,890 | 5,638 | 64.87% |

Parliament of Malaysia
| Year | Constituency | Candidate | Votes | Pct | Opponent(s) | Votes | Pct | Ballots cast | Majority | Turnout |
|---|---|---|---|---|---|---|---|---|---|---|
| 2022 | P174 Penampang | Kenny Chua Teck Ho (STAR) | 6,719 | 13.24% | Ewon Benedick (UPKO) | 29,066 | 57.30% | 50,730 | 14,410 | 65.70% |
| 2022 | P174 Penampang | Kenny Chua Teck Ho (STAR) | 6,719 | 13.24% | Darell Leiking (WARISAN) | 14,656 | 28.89% | 50,730 | 14,410 | 65.70% |
| 2022 | P174 Penampang | Kenny Chua Teck Ho (STAR) | 6,719 | 13.24% | Richard Jimmy (IND) | 289 | 0.57% | 50,730 | 14,410 | 65.70% |

== Honour ==
- Sabah
  - Commander of the Order of Kinabalu (PGDK) – Datuk (2023)
  - Companion of the Order of Kinabalu (ASDK) (2018)
