= Inanam (state constituency) =

Malaysian state constituency

Inanam (N18)
Sabah constituency

State constituency
- Legislature: Sabah State Legislative Assembly
MLA
Edna Jessica Majimbun
Heritage
- Constituency created: 1976
- First contested: 1976
- Last contested: 2025

Demographics
- Electors (2025): 45,525

Inanam is a state constituency in Sabah, Malaysia, that has been represented in the Sabah State Legislative Assembly. It is mandated to return a single member to the Assembly under the first-past-the-post voting system.

== Demographics ==
As of 2020, Inanam has a population of 107,352 people.

Ethnic breakdown of Inanam's electorate as of 2025
1. Non-Muslim Bumiputera (52.0%)
2. Muslim Bumiputera (26.0%)
3. Chinese (22.0%)
4. Other ethnicities (0.00%)

== History ==
=== Polling districts ===
According to the gazette issued on 31 October 2022, the Inanam constituency has a total of 11 polling districts.

State constituency	Polling District	Code	Location
Inanam (N18)	Inanam Laut	171/18/01	SK Lok Yuk Inanam; SK Inanam Laut
Inanam (N18)	Tebobon	171/18/02	SK Tebobon; SMK Tebobon
Inanam (N18)	Kokol	171/18/03	SK Kokol
Inanam (N18)	Menggatal	171/18/04	SJK (C) Good Shepherd Menggatal
Inanam (N18)	Pulutan	171/18/05	SJK (C) Lok Yuk Menggatal
Inanam (N18)	Inanam Darat	171/18/06	SK Kionsom Inanam; SK Pomotodon
Inanam (N18)	Poring-Poring	171/18/07	SK Poring-Poring
Inanam (N18)	Kolam Ayer	171/18/08	SJK (C) Yick Nam
Inanam (N18)	Cenderakasih	171/18/09	SK Mutiara Kota Kinabalu; SMA Kota Kinabalu
Inanam (N18)	Pekan Inanam	171/18/10	SK Kolombong Kota Kinabalu; SMK Kolombong
Inanam (N18)	Bantayan	171/18/11	SK Bantayan

=== Representation history ===
Members of the Legislative Assembly for Inanam
Assembly	No	Years	Member	Party
Constituency created from Moyog
5th	N22	1976-1978	Clarence E. Mansul	BERJAYA
5th	N22	1978-1981	Marcel Leiking	BERJAYA
6th	N22	1981-1985	Marcel Leiking	BN (BERJAYA)
7th	N27	1985-1986	Stephen Kinson Kutai @ Joni Biligan	PBS
8th	N27	1986-1990	Stephen Kinson Kutai @ Joni Biligan	PBS
9th	N27	1990-1994	Stephen Kinson Kutai @ Joni Biligan	GR (PBS)
10th	N27	1994	Stephen Kinson Kutai @ Joni Biligan	GR (PBS)
10th	N27	1994-1999	Stephen Kinson Kutai @ Joni Biligan	BN (PDS)
11th	N12	1999-2002	Johnny Goh Chin Lok (吴清乐)	PBS
11th	N12	2002–2004	Johnny Goh Chin Lok (吴清乐)	BN (PBS)
12th	N13	2004-2008	Johnny Goh Chin Lok (吴清乐)	BN (PBS)
13th	N13	2008-2013	Johnny Goh Chin Lok (吴清乐)	BN (PBS)
14th	N13	2013-2018	Roland Chia Ming Shen (谢铭圣)	PKR
15th	N13	2018-2020	Kenny Chua Teck Ho (蔡德和)	PH (PKR)
15th	N13	2020	Kenny Chua Teck Ho (蔡德和)	Independent
16th	N18	2020–2025	Peto Galim	PH (PKR)
17th	N18	2025–present	Edna Jessica Majimbun	WARISAN

== Election results ==
Sabah state election, 2025
Party	Candidate	Votes	%	∆%
Heritage	Edna Jessica Majimbun	9,441	33.49	▲33.49
Independent	Roland Chia Ming Shen	6,489	23.02	▲23.02
PH	Peto Galim	4,748	16.84	▲16.84
Homeland Solidarity Party	Kenny Chua Teck Ho	3,641	12.92	▲12.92
UPKO	Wong Thien Fook	1,639	5.81	▲5.81
KDM	Lewis Wong	561	1.99	▲1.99
Pejuangan Rakyat	Chia Yun Kong	460	1.63	▲1.63
Independent	Eric Shone Jr Majimbun	421	1.49	▲1.49
Sabah Family Party	Sumali @ Marino Ahmad	303	1.07	▲1.07
Sabah Dream Party	Paul Anap	210	0.74	▲0.74
Pertubuhan Parti Gemilang Anak Sabah	Martin Sibit	149	0.53	▲0.53
PBK	Gordon Lai Han Yung	68	0.24	▲0.24
Sabah Native Co-operation Party	Joseph Linggian @ Joseph Chong	60	0.21	▲0.21
Total valid votes		28,190		
Total rejected ballots		578		
Unreturned ballots		52		
Turnout		28,820	63.31	▼3.09
Registered electors		45,525		
Majority		2,952	10.47	▼22.15
Heritage gain from PKR		Swing		-
Source(s) "RESULTS OF CONTESTED ELECTION AND STATEMENTS OF THE POLL AFTER THE OFFICIAL ADDITION OF VOTES" (PDF).

Sabah state election, 2020
Party	Candidate	Votes	%	∆%
PKR	Peto Galim	8,586	49.67	+49.67
PBS	William Majinbon	2,948	17.05	N/A
Independent	Kenny Chua Teck Ho	2,346	13.57	N/A
LDP	Chong Kah Kiat	1,606	9.29	N/A
GAGASAN	Goh Fah Shun	362	2.09	N/A
Love Sabah Party	Regina Lim	291	1.68	N/A
Independent	Achmad Noorasyrul Noortaip	286	1.65	N/A
Sabah Native Co-operation Party	Terence Tsen Kim Fatt	255	1.48	-0.67
USNO (Baru)	Mohd Hary Abdullah	156	0.90	N/A
Independent	George Ngui	54	0.31	N/A
Total valid votes		16,890	97.71	
Total rejected ballots		360	2.08	
Unreturned ballots		36	0.21	
Turnout		17,286	66.40	
Registered electors		26,035		
Majority		5,638	32.62	
PKR hold		Swing		N/A
Source(s) "RESULTS OF CONTESTED ELECTION AND STATEMENTS OF THE POLL AFTER THE OFFICIAL ADDITION OF VOTES". Archived from the original on 2022-09-28.

Sabah state election, 2018
Party	Candidate	Votes	%	∆%
PH	Kenny Chua Teck Ho	13,633	60.97	+60.97
BN	Johnny Goh Chin Lok	5,850	26.16	-2.31
SAPP	John Stephen Dionysius	1,695	7.58	-17.30
Sabah Native Co-operation Party	Terence Tsen Kim Fatt	480	2.15	N/A
Sabah Nationality Party	Jakariah Janit	156	0.70	N/A
Independent	Situl Mintow	57	0.25	N/A
Total valid votes		21,871	97.81	
Total rejected ballots		316	1.41	
Unreturned ballots		173	0.77	
Turnout		22,360	79.96	
Registered electors		27,964		
Majority		7,783		
PH hold		Swing		+9.45
Source(s) "RESULTS OF CONTESTED ELECTION AND STATEMENTS OF THE POLL AFTER THE OFFICIAL ADDITION OF VOTES". Archived from the original on 2022-09-28.

Sabah state election, 2013
Party	Candidate	Votes	%	∆%
PKR	Roland Chia Ming Shen	8,926	44.39	+0.51
BN	Joseph Paulus Lantip	5,724	28.47	-15.41
SAPP	Enchin Majimbun @ Eric	5,003	24.88	N/A
Total valid votes		19,653	97.75	
Total rejected ballots		421	2.09	
Unreturned ballots		32	0.16	
Turnout		20,106	82.40	
Registered electors		24,403		
Majority		3,202		
PKR gain from BN		Swing		+7.96
Source(s) "KEPUTUSAN PILIHAN RAYA UMUM DEWAN UNDANGAN NEGERI". Archived from the original on 2022-11-06.

Sabah state election, 2008
Party	Candidate	Votes	%	∆%
BN	Johnny Goh Chin Lok	5,979	43.88	-11.43
PKR	Daniel John Jambun	4,293	31.51	N/A
DAP	Jeffrey Kumin @ John	2,864	21.02	-2.11
Independent	Clarence Chin @ Clay	196	1.44	N/A
Total valid votes		13,322	97.84	
Total rejected ballots		274	2.01	
Unreturned ballots		20	0.15	
Turnout		13,626	70.60	
Registered electors		19,300		
Majority		1,686		
BN hold		Swing		
Source(s) "KEPUTUSAN PILIHAN RAYA UMUM DEWAN UNDANGAN NEGERI SABAH BAGI TAHUN 2008".

Sabah state election, 2004
Party	Candidate	Votes	%	∆%
BN	Johnny Goh Chin Lok	6,413	55.31	N/A
DAP	Hiew King Cheu	2,682	23.13	N/A
Independent	Lee Kuan Hoh	1,813	15.64	N/A
BERSEKUTU	Lee Yuen Ten	198	1.71	N/A
Pan-Malaysian Islamic PartyOK	Rejolin John	171	1.47	N/A
Total valid votes		11,277	97.26	
Total rejected ballots		282	2.43	
Unreturned ballots		36	0.22	
Turnout		11,595	65.25	
Registered electors		17,770		
Majority		3,731		
BN gain from PBS		Swing		N/A
Source(s) "KEPUTUSAN PILIHAN RAYA UMUM DEWAN UNDANGAN NEGERI SABAH BAGI TAHUN 2004".

Sabah state election, 1999
Party	Candidate	Votes	%	∆%
PBS	Johnny Goh Chin Lok	9,648	61.19	-4.95
PKR	Christine Tibok Van Houten	4,940	31.33	N/A
Independent	Judy Hiew Miu Nyuk	1,081	6.86	N/A
Total valid votes		15,669	99.38	
Total rejected ballots		97	0.62	
Unreturned ballots		0	0.00	
Turnout		15,766	73.56	
Registered electors		21,433		
Majority		4,708		
PBS hold		Swing		
Source(s) "KEPUTUSAN PILIHAN RAYA UMUM DEWAN UNDANGAN NEGERI SABAH BAGI TAHUN 1999".

Sabah state election, 1994
Party	Candidate	Votes	%	∆%
PBS	Stephen Kinson Kutai	7,907	66.14	+0.05
BN	Paul Wong Kau Chai Sindin	3,828	32.02	N/A
SETIA	Samlin Adim	80	0.67	N/A
Total valid votes		11,815	98.83	
Total rejected ballots		140	1.17	
Unreturned ballots		0	0.00	
Turnout		11,955	76.80	
Registered electors		15,566		
Majority		4,079		
PBS hold		Swing		
Source(s) "KEPUTUSAN PILIHAN RAYA UMUM DEWAN UNDANGAN NEGERI SABAH BAGI TAHUN 1994".

Sabah state election, 1990
Party	Candidate	Votes	%	∆%
PBS	Stephen Kinson Kutai	6,758	66.09	+0.10
USNO	Lassim Abdul Rahman	2,178	21.30	N/A
BERJAYA	Freddie Angelo Solibun	658	6.43	-22.11
PRS	Felix K. F. Gusti	241	2.36	N/A
AKAR	Yungut Kimsang Taliban	153	1.50	N/A
LDP	Henry Liew Yun Kui	140	1.37	N/A
Total valid votes		10,128	99.04	
Total rejected ballots		98	0.96	
Unreturned ballots		0	0.00	
Turnout		10,226	78.19	
Registered electors		13,078		
Majority		4,580		
PBS hold		Swing		
Source(s) "KEPUTUSAN PILIHAN RAYA UMUM DEWAN UNDANGAN NEGERI SABAH BAGI TAHUN 1990".

Sabah state election, 1986
Party	Candidate	Votes	%	∆%
PBS	Stephen Kinson Kutai	5,575	65.99	
BERJAYA	Freddie Angelo Solibun	2,411	28.54	
PASOK	Ignatius Stephen Malanjum	380	4.50	
Total valid votes		8,366	99.03	
Total rejected ballots		82	0.97	
Unreturned ballots		0	0.00	
Turnout		8,448	77.78	
Registered electors		10,862		
Majority		3,164		
PBS hold		Swing		
Source(s) "KEPUTUSAN PILIHAN RAYA UMUM DEWAN UNDANGAN NEGERI SABAH BAGI TAHUN 1986".

Sabah state election, 1985
Party	Candidate	Votes	%	∆%
PBS	Stephen Kinson Kutai @ Joni Biligan	3,463	50.20	▲50.20
BERJAYA	Marcel Leiking	2,042	29.60	▼44.98
USNO	Mansur Ahbidin @ Mansur Bidin	1,394	20.21	▲20.21
PASOK	Edward Sinsua	80	1.16	▼22.15
Total valid votes		6,899	97.51	
Total rejected ballots		96		
Unreturned ballots		0	0.00	
Turnout		7,075	76.89	
Registered electors		9,201		
Majority		1,421	20.60	▼30.67
PBS gain from BERJAYA		Swing		?
Source(s) "How they fared". New Straits Times. 1985-04-22.

Sabah state election, 1981
Party	Candidate	Votes	%	∆%
BERJAYA	Marcel Leiking	4,456	74.58	▼5.10
PASOK	Peter Oyong Labinjang	1,393	23.31	▲23.31
Independent	Ibrahim Okk Mohd Laiman Diki	101	1.69	▼0.87
Independent	Daniel John Jambun	25	0.42	▼2.14
Total valid votes		5,975	100.00	
Total rejected ballots		98		
Unreturned ballots		0		
Turnout		6,073	79.23	▲13.45
Registered electors		7,665		
Majority		3,063	51.26	▼16.74
BERJAYA hold		Swing		
Source(s) "Sabah election: How they fared". New Straits Times. 1981-03-29.

Sabah state election, 1978
Party	Candidate	Votes	%	∆%
BERJAYA	Marshal Leiking	3,553	79.68	▲16.20
Independent	Charles Fung Yun Fatt	521	11.68	▲11.68
Independent	Mohd. Yassin	271	6.08	▲6.08
Independent	William Mijol	114	2.56	▲2.56
Total valid votes		4,459	100.00	
Total rejected ballots		65		
Unreturned ballots		0		
Turnout		4,524	65.78	▼18.14
Registered electors		6,877		
Majority		3,032	68.00	▲41.04
BERJAYA hold		Swing		-

Sabah state election, 1976
Party	Candidate	Votes	%
BERJAYA	Clarence Elong Mansul	3,002	63.48
USNO	Herman Luping	1,727	36.52
Total valid votes		4,729	100.00
Total rejected ballots		193	
Unreturned ballots		0	
Turnout		4,922	83.92
Registered electors		5,865	
Majority		1,275	26.96
This was a new constituency created
