= Roland Chia Ming Shen =

Malaysian politician

Yang Berbahagia Datuk Roland Chia Ming Shen PGDK
- 谢铭圣

Member of the Sabah State Legislative Assembly for Inanam
- In office 2013–2018
- Preceded by: Johnny Goh Chin Lok (BN–PBS)
- Succeeded by: Kenny Chua Teck Ho (PH–PKR)
- Majority: 3,202 (2013)

Personal details
- Born: Roland Chia Ming Shen; 11 October 1970 (age 55) Manggatal, Kota Kinabalu, Sabah, Malaysia
- Citizenship: Malaysian
- Party: PKR (till 2020); BERSATU (2020-2022); GAGASAN RAKYAT (member since 2023)
- Other political affiliations: Pakatan Rakyat (till 2015); Pakatan Harapan (2015-2020); Perikatan Nasional (2020-2022); Gabungan Rakyat Sabah (coalition member since 2023)
- Spouse: Cecilia Chong Su Ling
- Occupation: Politician

Roland Chia Ming Shen is a Malaysian politician from GAGASAN RAKYAT, a component party of the GRS. He is the Divisional Chairperson for N18 Inanam of GAGASAN RAKYAT since 2023 and He was the Member of Sabah State Legislative Assembly for Inanam from 2013 to 2018.

Since 2023, He is the Divisional Chairperson for N18 Inanam of GAGASAN RAKYAT and at the same time registered as direct member of GRS since 2023.

== Politics ==
Roland was appointed as the Chief of BERSEKUTU Wing of BERSATU Sabah from 2021 until the end of 2023. He later appointed as GAGASAN RAKYAT Sabah Divisional Chief of Gagasan Inanam Branch on 14 October 2023. He is also the Political secretary for Chief Minister of Sabah, Hajiji Noor.

== Election result ==
Sabah State Legislative Assembly
Year	Constituency	Candidate	Votes	Pct.	Opponent(s)	Votes	Pct.	Ballots cast	Majority	Turnout
2013	N13 Inanam	Roland Chia Ming Shen (PKR)	8,926	45.42%	Joseph Paulus Lantip (PBS)	5,724	29.13%	20,106	3,202	82.40%
2013	N13 Inanam	Roland Chia Ming Shen (PKR)	8,926	45.42%	Eric Majimbun (SAPP)	5,003	25.46%	20,106	3,202	82.40%

== Honours ==
- Sabah
  - Commander of the Order of Kinabalu (PGDK) – Datuk (2021)
