= Putatan (federal constituency) =

Federal constituency of Sabah, Malaysia

Putatan (P173)
Sabah constituency

Federal constituency
- Legislature: Dewan Rakyat
- MP: Shahelmey Yahya; BN
- Constituency created: 2003
- First contested: 2004
- Last contested: 2022

Demographics
- Population (2020): 115,203
- Electors (2025): 67,493
- Area (km²): 58
- Pop. density (per km²): 1,986.3

Putatan is a federal constituency in West Coast Division (Kota Kinabalu District, Penampang District and Papar District), Sabah, Malaysia, that has been represented in the Dewan Rakyat since 2004.

The federal constituency was created in the 2003 redistribution and is mandated to return a single member to the Dewan Rakyat under the first past the post voting system.

== Demographics ==
https://ge15.orientaldaily.com.my/seats/sabah/p

Ethnic breakdown of Putatan's electorate as of 2022
1. Sabah Bumiputera (42.6%)
2. Malay-Muslim Bumiputera (37.1%)
3. Chinese (14.0%)
4. Other ethnicities (6.20%)

As of 2020, Putatan has a population of 115,203 people.

Age breakdown of Putatan's electorate as of 2022
1. 18-20 (6.73%)
2. 21-29 (23.6%)
3. 30-39 (24.0%)
4. 40-49 (16.4%)
5. 50-59 (12.8%)
6. 60-69 (10.1%)
7. 70-79 (4.19%)
8. 80-89 (1.26%)
9. above 90 (0.84%)
Gender breakdown of Putatan's electorate as of 2022
1. Male (51.7%)
2. Female (48.3%)

== History ==
=== Polling districts ===
According to the gazette issued on 21 November 2025, the Putatan constituency has a total of 17 polling districts.

State constituency	Polling Districts	Code	Location
Tanjung Aru (N22）	Pulau Gaya	173/22/01	SK Pulau Gaya
Tanjung Aru (N22）	Sembulan Utara	173/22/02	SK Sembulan; Dewan Serbaguna Sembulan
Tanjung Aru (N22）	Sembulan Selatan	173/22/03	SMK Sanzac
Tanjung Aru (N22）	Tanjung Aru Timor	173/22/04	SMK Stella Maris
Tanjung Aru (N22）	Tanjung Aru Barat	173/22/05	SMK La Salle Tg Aru
Tanjung Aru (N22）	Lapangan Terbang	173/22/06	SK Tanjung Aru II
Tanjung Aru (N22）	Tanjung Aru Baru	173/22/07	SK Stella Maris
Petagas (N23）	Petagas	173/23/01	SK Petagas
Petagas (N23）	Ulu Putatan	173/23/02	SJK (C) Hwa Shiong
Petagas (N23）	Bandar Putatan	173/23/03	SA Negeri Putatan Penampang
Petagas (N23）	Paapason	173/23/04	SMK Tansau
Petagas (N23）	Tengah Padang	173/23/05	SA Negeri Petagas Penampang
Petagas (N23）	Tombovo	173/23/06	Sekolah Pendidikan Khas Sabah, Putatan
Tanjung Keramat (N24）	Muhibbah	173/24/01	SK Kg Contoh; SA Rakyat Tanjung Dumpil; Madrasah Assalam Kg Contoh
Tanjung Keramat (N24）	Pasir Putih	173/24/02	SMK Putatan; SK Pekan Putatan
Tanjung Keramat (N24）	Lok Kawi	173/24/03	SK Tombovo
Tanjung Keramat (N24）	Taman Pantai Lok Kawi	173/24/04	Dewan Masyarakat Lok Kawi

=== Representation history ===
Members of Parliament for Putatan
Parliament	No	Years	Member	Party	Vote Share
Constituency created from Gaya, Penampang and Tanjong Aru
11th	P173	2004-2008	Makin @ Marcus Mojigoh	BN (UPKO)	13,816; 69.78%
12th	P173	2008-2013	Makin @ Marcus Mojigoh	BN (UPKO)	13,737; 62.59%
13th	P173	2013-2018	Makin @ Marcus Mojigoh	BN (UPKO)	17,465; 60.03%
14th	P173	2018-2022	Awang Husaini Sahari (أواڠ حسيني صحارى)	PH (PKR)	14,106; 45.81%
15th	P173	2022–present	Shahelmey Yahya (شاه حلمي يحيى)	BN (UMNO)	16,234; 39.36%

=== State constituency ===
Parliamentary constituency	State constituency					
Parliamentary constituency	1967–1974	1974–1985	1985–1995	1995–2004	2004–2020	2020–present
Putatan					Petagas	
Putatan					Tanjong Aru	
Putatan						Tanjung Aru
Putatan						Tanjung Keramat

=== Historical boundaries ===
State Constituency	Area	
State Constituency	2003	2019
Petagas	Ketiau; Lok Kawi; Petagas; Putatan; Tombovo	Kampung Duvanson; Ketiau; Petagas; Putatan; Tombovo
Tanjung Aru	Kampung Bunga Raya; Kuala Putatan; Pulau Gaya; Sembulan; Tanjung Aru	Kampung Bunga Raya; Pulau Gaya; Sembulan; Sempelang; Tanjung Aru
Tanjung Keramat		Lok Kawi; Kampung Contoh; Kuala Putatan; Pasir Puteh; Tanjung Keramat

=== Current state assembly members ===
No.	State Constituency	Member	Coalition (Party)
N22	Tanjung Aru	Wong Hong Jun @ Junz Wong	WARISAN
N23	Petagas	Awang Ahmad Sah Awang Sahari	IND
N24	Tanjung Keramat	Shah Alfie Yahya Ahmad Shah	GRS (GAGASAN)

=== Local governments & postcodes ===
No.	State Constituency	Local Government	Postcode
N22	Tanjung Aru	Kota Kinabalu City Hall	80000, 88100, 88200 Kota Kinabalu; 89500 Penampang; 89600 Papar
N23	Petagas	Penampang Municipal Council	80000, 88100, 88200 Kota Kinabalu; 89500 Penampang; 89600 Papar
N24	Tanjung Keramat	Papar District Council (Taman Pantai Lok Kawi area); Penampang Municipal Council	80000, 88100, 88200 Kota Kinabalu; 89500 Penampang; 89600 Papar

== Election results ==
Malaysian general election, 2022
Party	Candidate	Votes	%	∆%
BN	Shahelmey Yahya	16,234	39.36	▲1.14
PH	Awang Husaini Sahari	16,110	39.06	▼6.75
Heritage	Ahmad Mohd Said	8,511	20.63	▲20.63
PEJUANG	Poyne Tudus @ Patrick Payne	394	0.96	▲0.96
Total valid votes		41,249	100.00	
Total rejected ballots		789		
Unreturned ballots		183		
Turnout		42,221	65.30	▼11.83
Registered electors		63,173		
Majority		124	0.30	▼7.30
BN gain from PKR		Swing		?
Source(s) https://lom.agc.gov.my/ilims/upload/portal/akta/outputp/1753262/PUB619_2022.pdf

Malaysian general election, 2018
Party	Candidate	Votes	%	∆%
PKR	Awang Husaini Sahari	14,106	45.81	▲45.81
BN	Makin @ Marcus Mojigoh	11,767	38.22	▼21.81
PAS	Zulzaim Hilmee Abidin	2,434	7.91	▲7.91
Sabah People's Hope Party	Jivol @ Edmund Doudilim	1,755	5.70	▲5.70
ANAK NEGERI	Mil Kusin Abdillah	728	2.36	▲2.36
Total valid votes		30,790	100.00	
Total rejected ballots		826		
Unreturned ballots		249		
Turnout		31,865	77.13	▼2.72
Registered electors		41,312		
Majority		2,339	7.60	▼25.08
PKR gain from BN		Swing		?
Source(s) "His Majesty's Government Gazette - Notice of Contested Election, Parliament for the State of Sabah [P.U. (B) 246/2018]" (PDF). Attorney General's Chambers of Malaysia. 3 May 2018. "Federal Government Gazette - Results of Contested Election and Statements of the Poll after the Official Addition of Votes, Parliamentary Constituencies for the State of Sabah [P.U. (B) 320/2018]" (PDF). Attorney General's Chambers of Malaysia. 28 May 2018. Archived from the original (PDF) on 29 December 2019.

Malaysian general election, 2013
Party	Candidate	Votes	%	∆%
BN	Makin @ Marcus Mojigoh	17,465	60.03	▼2.56
DAP	Lee Han Khyun @ Joseph Lee	7,958	27.35	▲27.35
STAR	Awang Ahmad Sah	2,604	8.95	▲8.95
SAPP	Duli @ Dullie Mari @ Marie	1,068	3.67	▲3.67
Total valid votes		29,095	100.00	
Total rejected ballots		665		
Unreturned ballots		176		
Turnout		29,936	79.85	▲13.17
Registered electors		37,490		
Majority		9,507	32.68	▲3.32
BN hold		Swing		
Source(s) "Federal Government Gazette - Notice of Contested Election, Parliament for the State of Sabah [P.U. (B) 183/2013]" (PDF). Attorney General's Chambers of Malaysia. 26 April 2013. Archived from the original (PDF) on 30 September 2018. "Federal Government Gazette - Results of Contested Election and Statements of the Poll after the Official Addition of Votes, Parliamentary Constituencies for the State of Sabah [P.U. (B) 224/2013]" (PDF). Attorney General's Chambers of Malaysia. 22 May 2013. Archived from the original (PDF) on 30 September 2018.

Malaysian general election, 2008
Party	Candidate	Votes	%	∆%
BN	Makin @ Marcus Mojigoh	13,737	62.59	▼7.19
PKR	Saukinah Yussof	7,292	33.23	▲3.01
Independent	Ramzah Ahmad	918	4.18	▲4.18
Total valid votes		21,947	100.00	
Total rejected ballots		608		
Unreturned ballots		741		
Turnout		23,296	66.68	▲4.40
Registered electors		34,935		
Majority		6,445	29.36	▼10.20
BN hold		Swing		

Malaysian general election, 2004
Party	Candidate	Votes	%
BN	Makin @ Marcus Mojigoh	13,816	69.78
PKR	Awang Ahmad Sah	5,984	30.22
Total valid votes		19,800	100.00
Total rejected ballots		725	
Unreturned ballots		727	
Turnout		21,252	62.28
Registered electors			
Majority		7,832	39.56
This was a new constituency created.
