= Jannie Lasimbang =

Malaysian politician

Yang Berbahagia Datuk Jannie Lasimbang PGDK ASDK
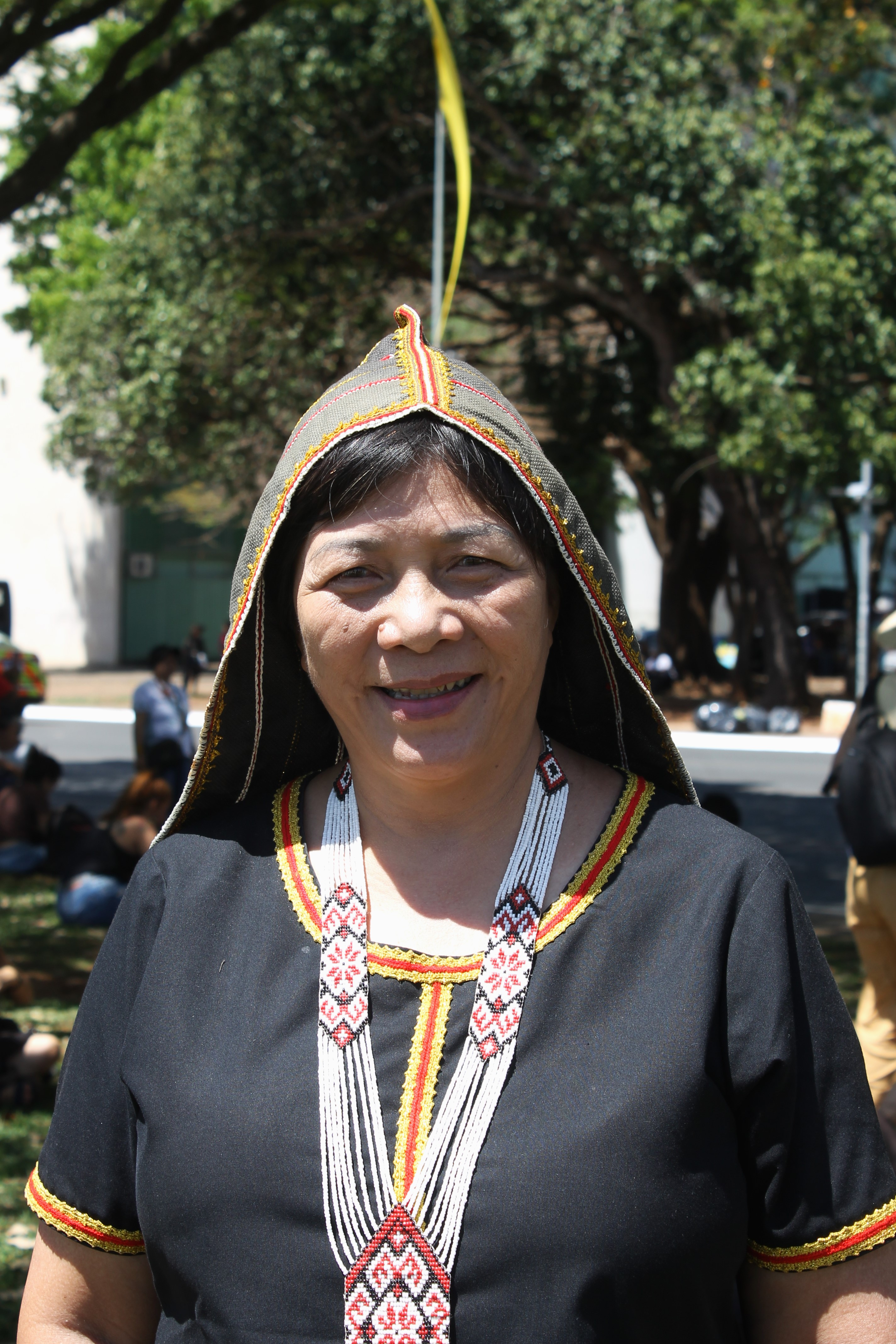

Chairperson of the Rural Development Corporation of Sabah
- Incumbent
- Assumed office 1 February 2023
- Governor: Juhar Mahiruddin (2023–2024); Musa Aman (2025)
- Chief Minister: Hajiji Noor
- Preceded by: Raime Unggi

State Assistant Minister of Law and Native Affairs of Sabah
- In office 16 May 2018 – 29 September 2020 Serving with Uda Sulai
- Governor: Juhar Mahiruddin
- Chief Minister: Shafie Apdal
- Minister: Aidi Moktar
- Preceded by: Position established
- Succeeded by: Position abolished
- Constituency: Kapayan

Member of the Sabah State Legislative Assembly for Kapayan
- In office 9 May 2018 – 29 November 2025
- Preceded by: Edwin Bosi (PR–DAP)
- Succeeded by: Chin Tek Ming (WARISAN)
- Majority: 13,250 (2018); 13,163 (2020)

International Secretary of the Democratic Action Party
- In office 20 March 2022 – 16 March 2025
- Secretary-General: Anthony Loke Siew Fook
- Assistant: Kasthuriraani Patto
- Preceded by: Teo Nie Ching
- Succeeded by: Kasthuriraani Patto

State Vice Chairperson of the Democratic Action Party of Sabah
- Incumbent
- Assumed office 27 October 2024 Serving with Noorita Sual
- Secretary-General: Anthony Loke Siew Fook
- State Chairman: Phoong Jin Zhe
- Preceded by: Tsen Nyuk Kee

Faction represented in the Sabah State Legislative Assembly
- 2018–2025: Pakatan Harapan

Personal details
- Born: Jannie Lasimbang; 29 November 1962 (age 63) Penampang, Crown Colony of North Borneo (now Sabah, Malaysia)
- Citizenship: Malaysia
- Party: Democratic Action Party (DAP)
- Other political affiliations: Pakatan Harapan (PH)
- Spouse: Sui Khar Hlawnching
- Relations: Jennifer Lasimbang (sister); Adrian Lasimbang (brother)
- Education: University of Kent
- Occupation: Politician

Jannie Lasimbang (born 29 November 1962) is a Malaysian politician who has served as Chairperson of the Rural Development Corporation (KPD) of Sabah since February 2023. She served as the State Assistant Minister of Law and Native Affairs of Sabah in the Heritage Party (WARISAN) state administration under former Chief Minister Shafie Apdal and former Minister Aidi Moktar from May 2018 to the collapse of the WARISAN state administration in September 2020 and Member of the Sabah State Legislative Assembly (MLA) for Kapayan from May 2018 to November 2025. She is a member of the Democratic Action Party (DAP), a component party of the Pakatan Harapan (PH) coalition. She has also served as the State Vice Chairperson of DAP of Sabah since October 2024. She also served as the International Secretary of DAP from March 2022 to March 2025. She is also the sister of Jennifer Lasimbang, former State Assistant Minister of Education and Innovation of Sabah and former Moyog MLA.

== Election results ==
Sabah State Legislative Assembly
Year	Constituency	Candidate	Votes	Pct	Opponent(s)	Votes	Pct	Ballots cast	Majority	Turnout
2018	N19 Kapayan	Jannie Lasimbang (DAP)	19,558	71.95%	Goh Fah Sun (MCA)	6,308	23.20%	27,557	13,250	81.80%
2018	N19 Kapayan	Jannie Lasimbang (DAP)	19,558	71.95%	Chong Pit Fah (STAR)	1,318	4.85%	27,557	13,250	81.80%
2020	N25 Kapayan	Jannie Lasimbang (DAP)	15,052	77.40%	Lu Yen Tung (MCA)	1,889	9.71%	19,447	13,163	64.75%
2020	N25 Kapayan	Jannie Lasimbang (DAP)	15,052	77.40%	Stephen Jacob Jimbangan (GAGASAN)	892	4.59%	19,447	13,163	64.75%
2020	N25 Kapayan	Jannie Lasimbang (DAP)	15,052	77.40%	Edwin Bosi (PBS)	803	4.13%	19,447	13,163	64.75%
2020	N25 Kapayan	Jannie Lasimbang (DAP)	15,052	77.40%	Yong Wui Chung (LDP)	428	2.20%	19,447	13,163	64.75%
2020	N25 Kapayan	Jannie Lasimbang (DAP)	15,052	77.40%	Chua Juan Shiuh (PCS)	325	1.67%	19,447	13,163	64.75%
2020	N25 Kapayan	Jannie Lasimbang (DAP)	15,052	77.40%	Chew Shung Seng (IND)	58	0.30%	19,447	13,163	64.75%
2025	N25 Kapayan	Jannie Lasimbang (DAP)			Chin Tek Ming (WARISAN)					
2025	N25 Kapayan	Jannie Lasimbang (DAP)			Edwin Jack Bosi (KDM)					
2025	N25 Kapayan	Jannie Lasimbang (DAP)			Bernard Abel Logijin (STAR)					
2025	N25 Kapayan	Jannie Lasimbang (DAP)			Billy Joe Dominic (UPKO)		%			
2025	N25 Kapayan	Jannie Lasimbang (DAP)			Chin Ling Ling (IMPIAN)					
2025	N25 Kapayan	Jannie Lasimbang (DAP)			Sylvester Molukun @ Sylvester Chin (ASPIRASI)		%			
2025	N25 Kapayan	Jannie Lasimbang (DAP)			Kuo Lee On (PBK)		%			
2025	N25 Kapayan	Jannie Lasimbang (DAP)			Lasius Miki (PR)		%			
2025	N25 Kapayan	Jannie Lasimbang (DAP)			Wong Kong Fooh (ANAK NEGERI)					
2025	N25 Kapayan	Jannie Lasimbang (DAP)			Cyril Gerald Liew (IND)					
2025	N25 Kapayan	Jannie Lasimbang (DAP)			Len Lip Fong @ Land Lip Fong (IND)		%			
2025	N25 Kapayan	Jannie Lasimbang (DAP)			Sabaria @ Sabariah Aziz (IND)		%			

== Honours ==
- Sabah
  - Commander of the Order of Kinabalu (PGDK) – Datuk (2025)
  - Companion of the Order of Kinabalu (ASDK) (2018)
