= Maktab Sabah, Kota Kinabalu =

Maktab Sabah / Sabah College
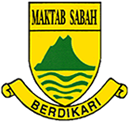

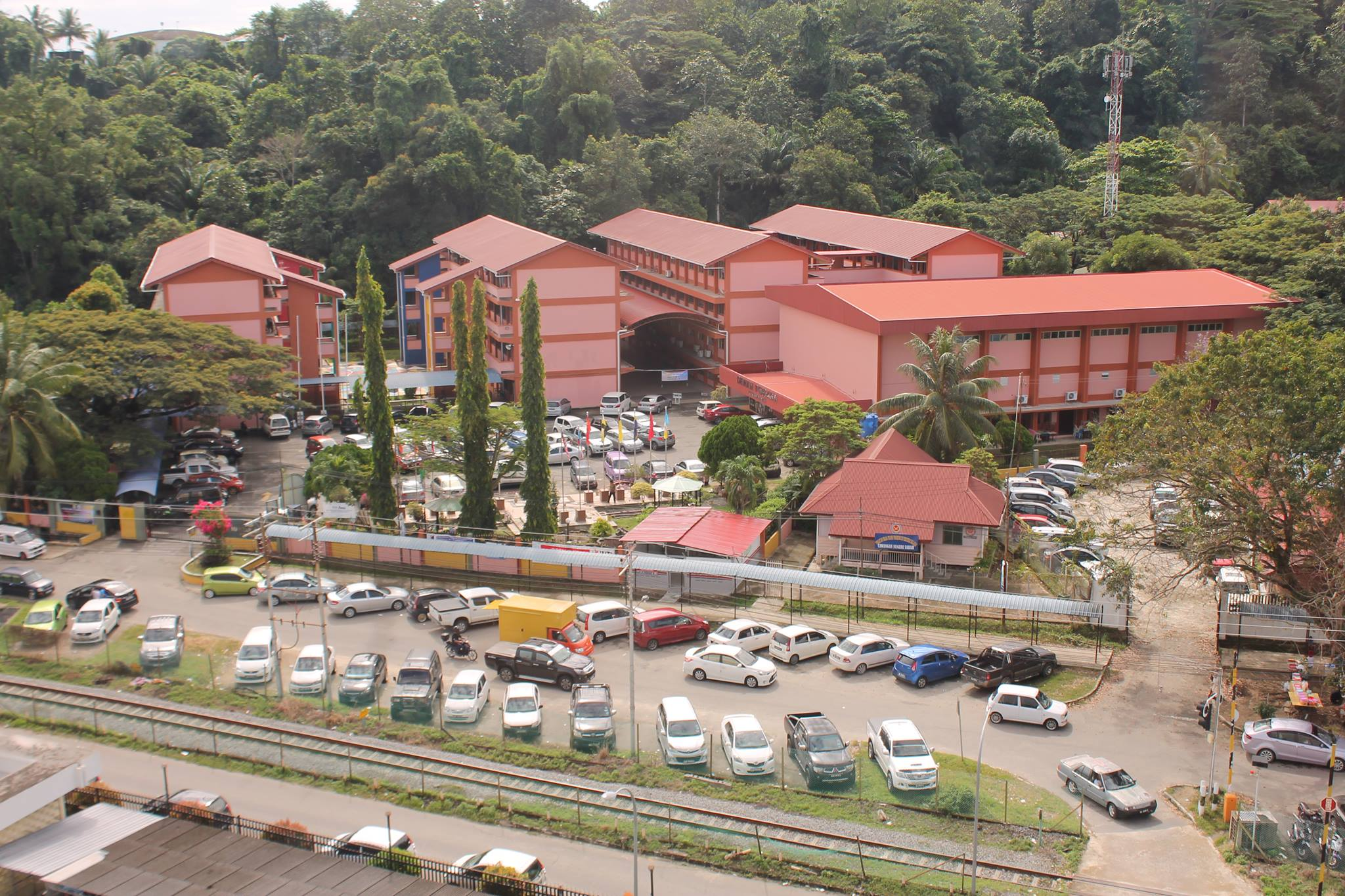
- Maktab Sabah current building

Location
- Peti Surat 10548 Sembulan, 88600 Kota Kinabalu, Sabah; Malaysia
- Coordinates: 5°57′21″N 116°4′3″E

Information
- Type: Semi-Boarding National Secondary School
- Motto: Berani Berdikari; Dare To Stand Alone
- Established: 1957
- School district: Kota Kinabalu
- Principal: Suhaimi Bin Basri
- Grades: Form 1 – Form 6
- Enrollment: Approx. 1400
- Slogan: Honouring Our Legacy: To Explore & To Excel (2024)
- Website: www.maktabsabah.com

Maktab Sabah (English: Sabah College) is a two-session secondary school located in the city of Kota Kinabalu, in the State of Sabah, Malaysia. The school was established in the year 1957, making Sabah College a historical institution as it was formed before the independence of Sabah.

As of the year 2021, the school has approximately 100 teachers and over 1300 students.

== History ==
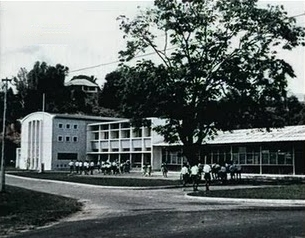
Old building of Maktab Sabah.

Establishment of Sabah College was suggested by the first education director of the North Borneo government, PE Perry in 1947. The purpose of this school is to help and provide education to potential and bright local children in North Borneo. Among the proposed construction sites are Likas (current SM All Saints site), Kepayan and current Queen Elizabeth Hospital. Finally, in 1955, the Civil Aviation Department site has been chosen to be the site of Sabah College with an area of 16.77 acres (67,900 m^{2}) which includes 6 acres (24,000 m^{2}) of sports field area, 4.8 acres (19,000 m^{2}) of residential areas and the rest is the school. In 1956 its construction plans had been proposed to the British Government and granted.

During the construction project the Colonial Development Welfare has funded 90% of the cost. While the rest was contributed by local sources. The first intake consist of 85 students and 95 teachers. Only selected students which passed special exam were chosen to study at Maktab Sabah. The school acting principal was Buckley. In the same year, Geoffrey Clarke was appointed as the very first principal of Sabah College.

At the end of 1957 this school was moved to a new site near the current Secretariat building. In 1958 Form Six classes started with limited facility of classes lessons.

Then, in 1960, Sabah College once again moved to a new site.

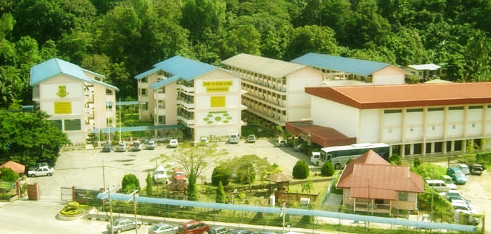
Maktab Sabah building in 2000s

== Principals ==
Below are the principals who have served and led Sabah College since its establishment.

- G.C. Clarke (May 1957 – May 1963)
- F.J. Rawcliffe (May 1963 – Dec 1966)
- Siew Peng Foo (January 1967 – May 1970)
- Datuk Vincent T.Y. Shia (May 1970 – September 1975)
- Yong Foo Sang (September 1975 – May 1980)
- Mokhtar Senik (May 1980 – January 1981)
- Ahmad A. Staun (January 1981 – 1986)
- Dg. Haruni (1986–1991)
- Hasnah Yunan (1991 – August 1996)
- Ahmad Abdul Wahab (September 1996 – May 1998)
- Julia Willie Jock (1998 – March 2006)
- Datuk Nuinda Alias (March 2006 – 6 January 2022)
- Nurani Fauziah Derin (7 January 2022 – 29 January 2024)
- Suhaimi Basri (1 February 2024 – present)

== Alumni (OSCA) ==
A student pursuing his secondary education in Maktab Sabah is commonly known as a Sabah Collegian; once the individual leaves the school, he is an Old Sabah Collegian. The school's alumni, Old Sabah Collegians Alumni is commonly referred to by its abbreviation, OSCA.

=== Notable alumni ===
- Awang Ahmad Sah Awang Sahari – Sabah state assemblyman for Petagas (in the Putatan electorate) of the Penampang district since 2020
- Malaya Ayalamshah Sibuku – state notary government surveyor
- Pandikar Amin Mulia – former Speaker of the Dewan Rakyat
- Anifah Aman – former Malaysian Minister of Foreign Affairs
- Maximus Ongkili – Malaysian cabinet minister from 2004 to 2022 cum former member of parliament and state assemblyman; also former Sabah state Assistant Minister in March 1994 (attended Form 6 in this school)
- Masidi Manjun – former Sabah State Minister of Tourism, Culture and Environment from 2008 to 2018, Minister of Housing and Local Government from 2020 to 2023, current Sabah Minister of Finance
- Shafie Apdal – former Malaysian Minister of Rural and Regional Development and 15th Chief Minister from 2018 to 2020 (attended from Forms 1 to 3, lower secondary)
- Musa Aman – 14th Chief Minister of Sabah from 2003 to 2018, Governor of Sabah since 2025 (alumnus in lower secondary, Forms 1 to 3)
- Nasir Sakaran – former Minister in the Chief Minister's Department of Sabah
- Yahya Hussin – former Deputy Chief Minister of Sabah and former Sabah state assemblyman for Petagas (in the Putatan electorate) of the Penampang district from 1994 to 2018
- Abdul Rahim Ismail – former Minister of Agriculture and Food Industry of Sabah
- Tham Nyip Shen – former Deputy Chief Minister of Sabah
- Salleh Said Keruak – former Chief Minister from 1994 to 1996 and Minister of Housing and Local Government of Sabah from 2002 to 2004, former federal cabinet Minister of Communications and Multimedia from 2015 to 2018, former State Legislative Assembly Speaker and former member of parliament cum state assemblyman
- Nahalan OKK Damsal – former Minister of Sports and Tourism of Sabah
- Juhar Mahiruddin – Governor of Sabah from 2011 to 2024
