= Tanjung Keramat =

Tanjong Keramat (N24)
Sabah constituency

State constituency
- Legislature: Sabah State Legislative Assembly
MLA
Shah Alfie Yahya
GRS
- Constituency created: 2019
- First contested: 2020
- Last contested: 2025

Demographics
- Electors (2025): 26,113

Tanjong Keramat is a state constituency in Sabah, Malaysia, that is represented in the Sabah State Legislative Assembly. This is one of the thirteen new state constituencies as result of approval from state legislative and Dewan Rakyat on 17 July 2019 and presenting for the first time for snap election

== Demographics ==
As of 2020, Tanjung Keramat has a population of 42,126 people.

Ethnic breakdown of Tanjung Keramat's electorate as of 2025
1. Muslim Bumiputera (70.0%)
2. Non-Muslim Bumiputera (23.0%)
3. Chinese (6.00%)
4. Other ethnicities (1.00%)

== History ==
=== Polling districts ===
According to the gazette issued on 31 October 2022, the Tanjung Keramat constituency has a total of 4 polling districts.

State constituency	Polling Districts	Code	Location
Tanjung Keramat (N24）	Muhibbah	173/24/01	SK Kg Contoh; SA Rakyat Tanjung Dumpil; Madrasah Assalam Kg Contoh
Tanjung Keramat (N24）	Pasir Putih	173/24/02	SMK Putatan; SK Pekan Putatan
Tanjung Keramat (N24）	Lok Kawi	173/24/03	SK Tombovo
Tanjung Keramat (N24）	Taman Pantai Lok Kawi	173/24/04	Dewan Masyarakat Lok Kawi

=== Representation history ===
Members of the Legislative Assembly for Tanjung Keramat
Assembly	No	Years	Member	Party
Constituency created from Kawang, Moyog, Tanjung Aru and Petagas
16th	N24	2020–2025	Shahelmey Yahya	BN (UMNO)
17th	N24	2025–present	Shah Alfie Yahya	GRS (GAGASAN)

== Election results ==
Sabah state election, 2025: Tanjung Keramat
Party	Candidate	Votes	%	∆%
GRS	Shah Alfie Yahya	5,699	33.15	▲33.15
BN	Jeffrey Nor Mohamed	4,546	26.45	▼22.06
Heritage	Mohammad Firdaus Diun	3,839	22.33	▼14.31
PN	Farish Adamz Shah @ Kanny	1,177	6.85	▲6.85
UPKO	Rosdy Wasli	806	4.69	▲4.69
Homeland Solidarity Party	Azni Mohd Salleh	479	2.79	▲2.79
KDM	Sugarah Miasin	256	1.49	▲1.49
Independent	Saifullah Phang	122	0.71	▲0.71
PBK	Jasni Matlani	122	0.71	▲0.71
Sabah Dream Party	Mahadthir Asbollah	114	0.66	▲0.66
Sabah Native Co-operation Party	Mil Kusin Abdillah	29	0.17	▲0.17
Total valid votes		17,189		
Total rejected ballots		497		
Unreturned ballots		31		
Turnout		17,717	67.85	▲1.90
Registered electors		26,113		
Majority		1,153	6.70	▼5.17
GRS gain from BN		Swing		-
Source(s) "RESULTS OF CONTESTED ELECTION AND STATEMENTS OF THE POLL AFTER THE OFFICIAL ADDITION OF VOTES" (PDF).

Sabah state election, 2020: Tanjung Keramat
Party	Candidate	Votes	%
BN	Shahelmy Yahya	4,594	48.51
Sabah Heritage Party	Rosdy Wasli	3,470	36.64
Love Sabah Party	Ira Uzair	363	3.83
LDP	Faezah Ibnu	329	3.47
USNO (Baru)	Mohd Salleh Lamsin	122	1.29
Total valid votes		8,878	93.75
Total rejected ballots		224	2.37
Unreturned ballots		368	3.89
Turnout		9,470	65.99
Registered electors		14,350	
Majority		1,337	11.87
This was a new constituency created.
Source(s) "RESULTS OF CONTESTED ELECTION AND STATEMENTS OF THE POLL AFTER THE OFFICIAL ADDITION OF VOTES".
