= Marcus Mojigoh =

Malaysian politician

Yang Berbahagia Datuk Marcus Mojigoh PJN PGDK JSM

Member of the Malaysian Parliament for Putatan
- In office 21 March 2004 – 9 May 2018
- Preceded by: Position established
- Succeeded by: Awang Husaini Sahari (PH–PKR)
- Majority: 7,832 (2004); 6,445 (2008); 10,173 (2013)

Personal details
- Born: 21 June 1951 (age 75) Putatan, Penampang, Crown Colony of North Borneo
- Party: United Progressive Kinabalu Organisation (UPKO) (–2020, 2022–present); Homeland Solidarity Party (STAR) (2021–2022)
- Spouse(s): Mathilda Timbong (deceased); Elizabeth Tindi
- Children: 4
- Relatives: Richard Malanjum (third cousin)
- Occupation: Politician
- Profession: Surveyor
- Website: marcus-mojigoh.blogspot.com

Marcus Mojigoh (born 21 June 1951) is a Malaysian politician who served as the Member of Parliament (MP) for Putatan from March 2004 to May 2018. He also previously served as Chairman of the Malaysian Cocoa Board and Saham Sabah Berhad. In addition, he was a member of the Homeland Solidarity Party (STAR), a component party of the ruling Gabungan Rakyat Sabah (GRS) and formerly the Perikatan Nasional (PN) coalition and was a member of the United Progressive Kinabalu Organisation (UPKO), then component party of the ruling Barisan Nasional (BN) coalition.

With the re-activation of the UPKO Putatan divisional branch on 4 November 2023, Marcus returned as Putatan UPKO divisional chief and strives to re-energize the UPKO Putatan division with a blend of old as well as new supporters from a mix of different backgrounds, but held this position only for a term of two and a half to three years, until he was succeeded by his committee member, Jason Lee, as the UPKO Putatan divisional chief in the said position in 2026.

In addition, he also penned a memoir of being brought up by a single widowed mother, Jinggunim Mojinggim Belimbing after losing his father unexpectedly at a very young age, by publishing and writing a book titled "A Leader Unraveled," launched at the ITCC Shopping Mall, Penampang on 22 June 2024. The launching was graced by Datuk Ewon Benedick, the Malaysian Minister of Entrepreneur and Cooperatives Development.

== Political career ==
Mojigoh's first political party was UPKO in the Barisan Nasional Sabah coalition. Mojigoh was elected to federal Parliament in the 2004 election using BN-UPKO logo defeating a People's Justice Party (PKR) candidate for the seat of Putatan. In 2018, he agreed with UPKO president Wilfred Madius Tangau to leave BN after the coalition's defeat in the 2018 Malaysian general election. In 2020, he left UPKO and became an independent. On 11 December 2021, Mojigoh unveiled that he had joined the STAR under the leadership of Jeffrey Kitingan a day prior on 10 December 2021. On 24 August 2022, Mojigoh left STAR after only eight months with the party as there were "limitations of freedom of speech" which prohibited him from "speaking up" if he remained in the party. He elaborated that he could not criticise STAR or Sabah state government leaders as he "always speak up on what is right and good for citizens of Malaysia and Sabah". On his political career and future self determination, Mojigoh added that he would remain as an independent for the time being as he might "stay free for the moment and I am free to say what I would like to say as a political activist as I am not too tied up with any political party". In addition, Mojigoh revealed that he had been invited by many political parties to join them but he was still thinking about it. "It depends on the leader, if they trust me and give me a role to play then I will consider it, that are all I want, which is something Sabahans will be happy about, not so much about this project or that project." Mojigoh also shared that any political platform that could offer stability to the country should be supported, "I think it is very important for us to form a very strong government because at the moment, both the State and Federal governments are in pieces...we do not know what is going to happen tomorrow". At the moment Datuk Marcus @ Makin Mojigoh is a Divisional Head of UPKO Putatan.

== Election results ==
Parliament of Malaysia
| Year | Constituency | Candidate | Votes | Pct | Opponent(s) | Votes | Pct | Ballots cast | Majority | Turnout |
|---|---|---|---|---|---|---|---|---|---|---|
| 2004 | P173 Putatan | Marcus Mojigoh (UPKO) | 13,816 | 69.78% | Awang Ahmad Sah (PKR) | 5,984 | 30.22% | 21,252 | 7,832 | 62.28% |
| 2008 | P173 Putatan | Marcus Mojigoh (UPKO) | 13,737 | 62.59% | Saukinah Yussof (PKR) | 7,292 | 33.23% | 23,296 | 6,445 | 66.68% |
| 2008 | P173 Putatan | Marcus Mojigoh (UPKO) | 13,737 | 62.59% | Ramzah Ahmad (IND) | 918 | 4.18% | 23,296 | 6,445 | 66.68% |
| 2013 | P173 Putatan | Marcus Mojigoh (UPKO) | 17,465 | 60.03% | Joseph Lee (DAP) | 7,292 | 27.35% | 29,936 | 9,507 | 79.85% |
| 2013 | P173 Putatan | Marcus Mojigoh (UPKO) | 17,465 | 60.03% | Awang Ahmad Sah (STAR) | 2,604 | 8.95% | 29,936 | 9,507 | 79.85% |
| 2013 | P173 Putatan | Marcus Mojigoh (UPKO) | 17,465 | 60.03% | Duli @ Dullie Mari @ Marie (SAPP) | 1,068 | 3.67% | 29,936 | 9,507 | 79.85% |
| 2018 | P173 Putatan | Marcus Mojigoh (UPKO) | 11,767 | 38.22% | Awang Husaini Sahari (PKR) | 14,106 | 45.81% | 31,865 | 2,339 | 77.13% |
| 2018 | P173 Putatan | Marcus Mojigoh (UPKO) | 11,767 | 38.22% | Zulzaim Hilmee Abidin (PAS) | 2,434 | 7.91% | 31,865 | 2,339 | 77.13% |
| 2018 | P173 Putatan | Marcus Mojigoh (UPKO) | 11,767 | 38.22% | Jivol @ Edmund Doudilim (HR) | 1,755 | 5.70% | 31,865 | 2,339 | 77.13% |
| 2018 | P173 Putatan | Marcus Mojigoh (UPKO) | 11,767 | 38.22% | Mil Kusin Abdillah (ANAK NEGERI) | 728 | 2.36% | 31,865 | 2,339 | 77.13% |

== Honours ==
- Malaysia
  - Companion of the Order of Loyalty to the Crown of Malaysia (JSM) (2005)
  - Commander of the Order of Meritorious Service (PJN) – Datuk (2017)
- Sabah
  - Commander of the Order of Kinabalu (PGDK) – Datuk (1999)
