= Edwin Jack Bosi =

Malaysian politician

Member of the Sabah State Legislative Assembly for Kapayan
- In office 5 May 2013 – 9 May 2018
- Preceded by: Khoo Keok Hai (BN–MCA)
- Succeeded by: Jannie Lasimbang (PH–DAP)
- Majority: 7,287 (2013)

Personal details
- Citizenship: Malaysian
- Party: Democratic Action Party (DAP) (Until 2017); Sabah Native Cooperation Party (ANAK NEGERI) (2017–2019, 2024–2025); United Sabah Party (PBS) (2019–2020); Social Democratic Harmony Party (KDM) (since 2025)
- Other political affiliations: Pakatan Rakyat (PR) (Until 2015); Pakatan Harapan (PH) (2015–2017); Gabungan Rakyat Sabah (GRS) (2020–2022)
- Occupation: Politician, Veterinarian

Edwin Jack Bosi is a Malaysian politician who served as a Member of the Sabah State Legislative Assembly (MLA) for Kapayan from 2013 to 2018. He was formerly a member of the Democratic Action Party (DAP) and was its first assemblyman of Kadazandusun descent.

In April 2015, Bosi was named in an injunction prohibiting him and other opposition leaders from attending a May Day rally organised by the non-governmental organisation Bersih.

The same year, in response to the prohibition of the term "secession" in the state legislative assembly by its newly elected speaker, Bosi announced his intention to challenge the ban during an upcoming assembly sitting.

Bosi abstained from voting on a motion to ban People's Justice Party (PKR) vice-presidents Nurul Izzah Anwar and Tian Chua from entering the state of Sabah over their meeting with the daughter of Jamalul Kiram III, a pretender to the Sulu Sultanate, Jacel Kiram.

In August 2016, the media reported that Bosi had resigned from the Democratic Action Party, with the party's state secretary quoted as saying that Bosi had sent his resignation letter to the party's leadership. Bosi, who had been replaced as state secretary during state committee elections last November, denied resigning from the party and questioned the motives of those who had disseminated the claim. Rumours of his resignation surfaced once again at the end of August as a result of his absence from the state party's policy forum.

In October the same year, Bosi was appointed state party deputy chairman after the party experienced an exodus of members from its Sabah chapter.

In May 2017, Bosi was suspended by the party over his comments earlier in April, having stated he would leave the party unless he was allowed to defend his seat in the upcoming general election in 2018, and criticising state chairman Wong Tien Fatt for what Bosi perceived as the former's disinterest in indigenous issues as well as an unwillingness to fight for indigenous rights.

Bosi announced his resignation from the Democratic Action Party in August, coinciding with the end of his three-month suspension, and cited his disagreements with party leadership as the main reason. Bosi's resignation left the party with only a single member in the state legislative assembly, Chan Foong Hin. Bosi would later join the Sabah Native Cooperation Party (ANAK NEGERI) in October.

During the 2018 Malaysian general election, Bosi contested the federal constituency of Penampang within the Kadazan heartland, in which his former state constituency of Kapayan is located, in a four-cornered fight. He came last in the election, losing out to Darell Leiking of the Heritage Party (WARISAN), garnering 445 votes or 1.03% of the total vote share.

Bosi represented the United Sabah Party (PBS) in the 2020 Sabah state election, contesting his former state constituency of Kapayan along with six other candidates. He lost the election to the incumbent Jannie Lasimbang of the Democratic Action Party, coming fourth with 803 votes or 4.06% of the total vote share.

During the 2022 Malaysian general election, Bosi endorsed the Pakatan Harapan–United Progressive Kinabalu Organisation candidate, Ewon Benedick, for the federal constituency of Penampang, and helped him campaign for the election. Benedick won the seat from Darell Leiking, overturning a 23,473 vote majority.

== Personal life ==
Bosi is related to the Lasimbangs, including the sisters Jennifer and Jannie, both of whom are politicians.

== Election results ==
Sabah State Legislative Assembly
Year	Constituency	Candidate	Votes	Pct	Opponent(s)	Votes	Pct	Ballots cast	Majority	Turnout
2013	N19 Kapayan	Edwin Jack Bosi (DAP)	13,020	48.64%	Khoo Keok Hai (MCA)	5,733	21.42%	22,032	7,287	82.30%
2013	N19 Kapayan	Edwin Jack Bosi (DAP)	13,020	48.64%	Chong Pit Fah (SAPP)	2,030	7.58%	22,032	7,287	82.30%
2013	N19 Kapayan	Edwin Jack Bosi (DAP)	13,020	48.64%	Daniel Dell Fidelis (STAR)	720	2.69%	22,032	7,287	82.30%
2020	N25 Kapayan	Edwin Jack Bosi (PBS)	803	4.13%	Jannie Lasimbang (DAP)	15,052	77.40%%	19,447	13,163	64.75%
2020	N25 Kapayan	Edwin Jack Bosi (PBS)	803	4.13%	Lu Yen Tung (MCA)	1,889	9.71%	19,447	13,163	64.75%
2020	N25 Kapayan	Edwin Jack Bosi (PBS)	803	4.13%	Stephen Jacob Jimbangan (GAGASAN)	892	4.59%	19,447	13,163	64.75%
2020	N25 Kapayan	Edwin Jack Bosi (PBS)	803	4.13%	Yong Wui Chung (LDP)	428	2.20%	19,447	13,163	64.75%
2020	N25 Kapayan	Edwin Jack Bosi (PBS)	803	4.13%	Chua Juan Shiuh (PCS)	325	1.67%	19,447	13,163	64.75%
2020	N25 Kapayan	Edwin Jack Bosi (PBS)	803	4.13%	Chew Shung Seng (IND)	58	0.30%	19,447	13,163	64.75%
2025	N25 Kapayan	Edwin Jack Bosi (KDM)		%	Jannie Lasimbang (DAP)		%			
2025	N25 Kapayan	Edwin Jack Bosi (KDM)		%	Chin Tek Ming (WARISAN)		%			
2025	N25 Kapayan	Edwin Jack Bosi (KDM)		%	Bernard Abel Logijin (STAR)		%			
2025	N25 Kapayan	Edwin Jack Bosi (KDM)		%	Billy Joe Dominic (UPKO)		%			
2025	N25 Kapayan	Edwin Jack Bosi (KDM)		%	Chin Ling Ling (IMPIAN)		%			
2025	N25 Kapayan	Edwin Jack Bosi (KDM)		%	Wong Kong Fooh (ANAK NEGERI)		%			
2025	N25 Kapayan	Edwin Jack Bosi (KDM)		%	Sylvester Molukun @ Sylvester Chin (ASPIRASI)		%			
2025	N25 Kapayan	Edwin Jack Bosi (KDM)		%	Kuo Lee On (PBK)		%			
2025	N25 Kapayan	Edwin Jack Bosi (KDM)		%	Lasius Miki (PR)		%			
2025	N25 Kapayan	Edwin Jack Bosi (KDM)		%	Cyril Gerald Liew (IND)		%			
2025	N25 Kapayan	Edwin Jack Bosi (KDM)		%	Len Lip Fong @ Land Lip Fong (IND)		%			
2025	N25 Kapayan	Edwin Jack Bosi (KDM)		%	Sabaria @ Sabariah Aziz (IND)		%			

Parliament of Malaysia
Year	Constituency	Candidate	Votes	Pct	Opponent(s)	Votes	Pct	Ballots cast	Majority	Turnout
2018	P174 Penampang	Edwin Jack Bosi (PKAN)	445	1.03%	Darell Leiking (WARISAN)	32,470	75.32%	43,525	23,473	82.17%
2018	P174 Penampang	Edwin Jack Bosi (PKAN)	445	1.03%	Ceasar Mandela Malakun (UPKO)	8,997	20.87%	43,525	23,473	82.17%
2018	P174 Penampang	Edwin Jack Bosi (PKAN)	445	1.03%	Cleftus Stephen Spine (STAR)	1,196	2.77%	43,525	23,473	82.17%
