= Uda Sulai =

Malaysian politician

Yang Berbahagia Datuk Uda Sulai PGDK

State Assistant Minister of Law and Native Affairs of Sabah
- In office 16 May 2018 – 29 September 2020 Serving with Jannie Lasimbang
- Governor: Juhar Mahiruddin
- Chief Minister: Shafie Apdal
- Minister: Aidi Moktar
- Preceded by: Position established
- Succeeded by: Position abolished
- Constituency: Petagas

Member of the Sabah State Legislative Assembly for Petagas
- In office 9 May 2018 – 2020
- Preceded by: Yahyah Hussin (BN–UMNO)
- Succeeded by: Awang Ahmad Sah Awang Sahari (WARISAN)
- Majority: 208 (2018)

Faction represented in Sabah State Legislative Assembly
- 2018–2020: Sabah Heritage Party

Personal details
- Born: Uda bin Sulai; 17 September 1943 (age 82) Putatan, Crown Colony of North Borneo (now Sabah, Malaysia)
- Citizenship: Malaysian
- Party: Sabah Heritage Party (WARISAN)
- Other political affiliations: Barisan Nasional (BN) (−2018)
- Occupation: Politician

Uda bin Sulai is a Malaysian politician who has been the State Assistant Minister. He served as the Member of Sabah State Legislative Assembly (MLA) for Petagas from May 2018 until September 2020. He is a member of the Sabah Heritage Party (WARISAN).

== Election results ==
Sabah State Legislative Assembly
Year	Constituency	Candidate	Votes	Pct	Opponent(s)	Votes	Pct	Ballots cast	Majority	Turnout
1999	N17 Petagas	Uda Sulai (PBS)	5,447	33.53%	Yahyah Hussin (UMNO)	9,234	56.84%	16,246	3,787	70.17
1999	N17 Petagas	Uda Sulai (PBS)	5,447	33.53%	Mohd Dini Mohd Khan (BERSEKUTU)	960	5.91%	16,246	3,787	70.17
1999	N17 Petagas	Uda Sulai (PBS)	5,447	33.53%	Musa Abdul Rahman (SETIA)	122	0.75%	16,246	3,787	70.17
2018	N18 Petagas	Uda Sulai (WARISAN)	6,526	47.97%	Yahyah Hussin (UMNO)	6,318	46.44%	14,021	208	80.20%
2018	N18 Petagas	Uda Sulai (WARISAN)	6,526	47.97%	Ester Otion (PHRS)	760	5.59%	14,021	208	80.20%
2025	N23 Petagas	Uda Sulai (WARISAN)		%	Awang Husaini Sahari (PKR)		%			
2025	N23 Petagas	Uda Sulai (WARISAN)		%	Awang Ahmad Sah Awang Sahari (IND)		%			
2025	N23 Petagas	Uda Sulai (WARISAN)		%	Afifi Saif (PAS)		%			
2025	N23 Petagas	Uda Sulai (WARISAN)		%	Adelaide Cornelius (KDM)		%			
2025	N23 Petagas	Uda Sulai (WARISAN)		%	Annita Shiela Among (STAR)		%			
2025	N23 Petagas	Uda Sulai (WARISAN)		%	Jason Lee Nyuk Soon (UPKO)		%			
2025	N23 Petagas	Uda Sulai (WARISAN)		%	Aslin Samat (IMPIAN)		%			
2025	N23 Petagas	Uda Sulai (WARISAN)		%	Sabrezani Sabdin (ANAK NEGERI)		%			

== Honours ==
- Sabah :
  - Commander of the Order of Kinabalu (PGDK) – Datuk (2018)
