= Awang Husaini Sahari =

Malaysian politician (born 1967)

Awang Husaini Sahari ASDK JP
- أواڠ حسيني صحارى

Member of the Malaysian Parliament for Putatan
- In office 9 May 2018 – 19 November 2022
- Preceded by: Marcus Mojigoh (BN–UPKO)
- Succeeded by: Shahelmey Yahya (BN–UMNO)
- Majority: 2,339 (2018)

Vice President of the People's Justice Party (Appointed)
- In office 20 July 2022 – 23 May 2025 Serving with: Amirudin Shari &; Chang Lih Kang &; Nik Nazmi Nik Ahmad &; Aminuddin Harun &; Nurul Izzah Anwar (Appointed) &; Saraswathy Kandasami (Appointed)
- President: Anwar Ibrahim
- Preceded by: Michael Teo Yu Keng
- Succeeded by: Roland Engan

Faction represented in Dewan Rakyat
- 2018–2022: Pakatan Harapan

Personal details
- Born: Awang Husaini bin Sahari; 2 March 1967 (age 59) Sabah, Malaysia
- Citizenship: Malaysia
- Party: People's Justice Party (PKR)
- Other political affiliations: Pakatan Harapan (PH)
- Relations: Awang Ahmad Sah (Elder brother)
- Education: La Salle Secondary School, Kota Kinabalu
- Alma mater: Anglia Ruskin University
- Occupation: Politician

Awang Husaini bin Sahari (born 2 March 1967) is a Malaysian politician who served as the Member of Parliament (MP) for Putatan from May 2018 to November 2022. He is a member and the Division Chief of Putatan of the People's Justice Party (PKR), a component party of the Pakatan Harapan (PH) coalition. He served as an appointed Vice President of PKR (Borneo Quota) from July 2022 to May 2025.

== Political career ==
=== Member of Parliament for Putatan (2018–2022) ===
In the 2018 general election, PKR fielded him to contest the Putatan federal seat, facing Marcus Mojigoh from the United Pasokmomogun Kadazandusun Organisation (UPKO), a component party of the ruling Barisan Nasional (BN) coalition. Awang won the seat. In the 2022 general election, he was renominated to contest for the Putatan seat. Unfortunately, he was narrowly defeated by Shahelmey Yahya from BN and United Malays National Organisation of Sabah (Sabah UMNO) by only 124 votes.

=== Vice President of the People's Justice Party (2022–2025) ===
On 20 July 2022, 3 days after the 2022 PKR party elections officially ended, he was appointed as Vice President of PKR alongside Permatang Pauh MP Nurul Izzah Anwar who was in the position for 8 years from 2010 to 2018 and new officeholder Saraswathy Kandasami by PKR President Anwar Ibrahim after the decision was made in the PKR Central Leadership Council (MPP) meeting that night.

== Election results ==
Parliament of Malaysia
Year	Constituency	Candidate	Votes	Pct	Opponent(s)	Votes	Pct	Ballots cast	Majority	Turnout
2018	P173 Putatan	Awang Husaini Sahari (PKR)	14,106	45.81%	Marcus Mojigoh (UPKO)	11,767	38.22%	31,865	2,339	77.13%
2018	P173 Putatan	Awang Husaini Sahari (PKR)	14,106	45.81%	Zulzaim Hilmee Abidin (PAS)	2,434	7.91%	31,865	2,339	77.13%
2018	P173 Putatan	Awang Husaini Sahari (PKR)	14,106	45.81%	Edmund Jivol Doudilim (PHRS)	1,755	5.70%	31,865	2,339	77.13%
2018	P173 Putatan	Awang Husaini Sahari (PKR)	14,106	45.81%	Mil Kusin Abdillah Sulai (ANAK NEGERI)	728	2.36%	31,865	2,339	77.13%
2022	P173 Putatan	Awang Husaini Sahari (PKR)	16,110	39.06%	Shahelmey Yahya (Sabah UMNO)	16,234	39.36%	42,221	124	65.30%
2022	P173 Putatan	Awang Husaini Sahari (PKR)	16,110	39.06%	Ahmad Mohd Said (WARISAN)	8,511	20.63%	42,221	124	65.30%
2022	P173 Putatan	Awang Husaini Sahari (PKR)	16,110	39.06%	Poyne Tudus @ Patrick Payne (PEJUANG)	394	0.96%	42,221	124	65.30%

Sabah State Legislative Assembly
Year	Constituency	Candidate	Votes	Pct	Opponent(s)	Votes	Pct	Ballots cast	Majority	Turnout
2025	N23 Petagas	Awang Husaini Sahari (PKR)	3,016	22.52%	Awang Ahmad Sah (IND)	4,271	31.89%	13,594	1,255	67.75%
2025	N23 Petagas	Awang Husaini Sahari (PKR)	3,016	22.52%	Uda Sulai (WARISAN)	2,912	21.74%	13,594	1,255	67.75%
2025	N23 Petagas	Awang Husaini Sahari (PKR)	3,016	22.52%	Jason Lee Nyuk Soon (UPKO)	1,306	9.75%	13,594	1,255	67.75%
2025	N23 Petagas	Awang Husaini Sahari (PKR)	3,016	22.52%	Mohd Afifi Shaiffuddin (PAS)	1,283	9.58%	13,594	1,255	67.75%
2025	N23 Petagas	Awang Husaini Sahari (PKR)	3,016	22.52%	Annita Shiela F. Among (STAR)	276	2.06%	13,594	1,255	67.75%
2025	N23 Petagas	Awang Husaini Sahari (PKR)	3,016	22.52%	Aslin Samat (IMPIAN)	133	0.99%	13,594	1,255	67.75%
2025	N23 Petagas	Awang Husaini Sahari (PKR)	3,016	22.52%	Adelaide Cornelius (KDM)	122	0.91%	13,594	1,255	67.75%
2025	N23 Petagas	Awang Husaini Sahari (PKR)	3,016	22.52%	Sabrezani Sabdin (ANAK NEGERI)	40	0.30%	13,594	1,255	67.75%
2025	N23 Petagas	Awang Husaini Sahari (PKR)	3,016	22.52%	Patrick Manius (IND)	34	0.25%	13,594	1,255	67.75%

== Honours ==
- Sabah
  - Companion of the Order of Kinabalu (ASDK) (2018)
  - Justice of the Peace (JP) (2019)
