= Kapayan =

Kapayan (N25)
Sabah constituency

State constituency
- Legislature: Sabah State Legislative Assembly
MLA
Chin Tek Ming
Heritage
- Constituency created: 2004
- First contested: 2004
- Last contested: 2025

Demographics
- Electors (2025): 49,547

Kapayan is a state constituency in Sabah, Malaysia, that is represented in the Sabah State Legislative Assembly.

== Demographics ==
As of 2020, Kapayan has a population of 118,966 people.

Ethnic breakdown of Kapayan's electorate as of 2025
1. Non-Muslim Bumiputera (49.0%)
2. Chinese (33.0%)
3. Muslim Bumiputera (17.0%)
4. Other ethnicities (1.00%)

== History ==
=== Polling districts ===
According to the gazette issued on 31 October 2022, the Kapayan constituency has a total of 7 polling districts.

| State constituency | Polling District | Code | Location |
|---|---|---|---|
| Kapayan (N25) | Kapayan Barat | 174/25/01 | Institut Latihan Jabatan Kerja Raya Kota Kinabalu |
| Kapayan (N25) | Kapayan | 172/25/02 | SK Kepayan; Dewan Raya Kepayan Kampung Kibouvang; Dewan Raya Kampung Ganang |
| Kapayan (N25) | Kapayan Timor | 174/25/03 | SJK (C) Shan Tao; Dewan Serbaguna Taman Sri Kepayan |
| Kapayan (N25) | Kobusak | 174/25/04 | SK Bahang; Dewan KDCA Penampang |
| Kapayan (N25) | Nosoob | 174/25/05 | SMK Bahang; Balairaya Kampung Koidupan Penampang; SK Luyang; SK St. Francis Convent |
| Kapayan (N25) | Donggongon | 174/25/06 | SJK (C) Yue Min Puluduk |
| Kapayan (N25) | Hungab | 174/25/07 | SK Dimpokuan Penampang |

=== Representation history ===
Member of Sabah State Legislative Assembly for Kapayan
| Assembly | No | Years | Member | Party |
Constituency created from Moyog, Api-Api and Sembulan
| 12th | N19 | 2004 – 2008 | Edward Khoo Keok Hai (邱克海) | BN (MCA) |
| 13th | N19 | 2008 – 2013 | Edward Khoo Keok Hai (邱克海) | BN (MCA) |
| 14th | N19 | 2013 – 2017 | Edwin Jack Bosi | PR (DAP) |
| 14th | N19 | 2017 – 2018 | Edwin Jack Bosi | AN |
| 15th | N19 | 2018 – 2020 | Jannie Lasimbang | PH (DAP) |
| 16th | N25 | 2020 – 2025 | Jannie Lasimbang | PH (DAP) |
| 17th | N25 | 2025–present | Chin Tek Ming (陈德明) | WARISAN |

== Election results ==
Sabah state election, 2025: Kapayan
| Party | Candidate | Votes | % | ∆% |
|---|---|---|---|---|
| Heritage | Chin Tek Ming | 14,597 | 50.44 | ▼25.68 |
| PH | Jannie Lasimbang | 5,341 | 18.46 | ▲18.46 |
| UPKO | Billy Joe Dominic | 3,496 | 12.08 | ▲12.08 |
| Homeland Solidarity Party | Bernard Abel Logijin | 2,764 | 9.55 | ▲9.55 |
| Independent | Cyril Gerald Liew | 683 | 2.36 | ▲2.36 |
| KDM | Edwin Jack Bosi | 660 | 2.28 | ▲2.28 |
| Sabah Dream Party | Chin Ling Ling | 487 | 1.68 | ▲1.68 |
| Independent | Sabrina @ Sabariah Aziz | 474 | 1.64 | ▲1.64 |
| Perjuangan Rakyat | Lasius Miki | 132 | 0.46 | ▲0.46 |
| PBK | Kuo Lee On | 102 | 0.35 | ▲0.35 |
| ASPIRASI | Sylvester Moloukun | 81 | 0.28 | ▲0.28 |
| Independent | Land Lip Fong | 68 | 0.23 | ▲0.23 |
| Sabah Native Co-operation Party | Wong Kong Fooh | 53 | 0.18 | ▲0.18 |
| Total valid votes | | 28,938 | | |
| Total rejected ballots | | 272 | | |
| Unreturned ballots | | 55 | | |
| Turnout | | 29,265 | 59.01 | ▼7.56 |
| Registered electors | | 49,547 | | |
| Majority | | 9,256 | 31.98 | ▼34.59 |
| Heritage hold | | Swing | | |
Source(s) "RESULTS OF CONTESTED ELECTION AND STATEMENTS OF THE POLL AFTER THE OFFICIAL ADDITION OF VOTES" (PDF).

Sabah state election, 2020: Kapayan
| Party | Candidate | Votes | % | ∆% |
|---|---|---|---|---|
| Sabah Heritage Party | Jannie Lasimbang | 15,052 | 76.12 | ▲76.12 |
| BN | Lu Yen Tung | 1,889 | 9.55 | ▼12.36 |
| GAGASAN | Stephen Jacob Jimbangan | 892 | 4.51 | ▲4.51 |
| PBS | Edwin Jack Bosi | 803 | 4.06 | ▲4.06 |
| LDP | Yong Wui Chung | 428 | 2.16 | ▲2.16 |
| Love Sabah Party | Chua Juan Shiuh | 325 | 1.64 | ▲1.64 |
| Independent | Chew Shung Seng | 58 | 0.29 | ▲0.29 |
| Total valid votes | | 19,447 | 98.35 | |
| Total rejected ballots | | 282 | 1.43 | |
| Unreturned ballots | | 44 | 0.22 | |
| Turnout | | 19,773 | 65.84 | ▼15.99 |
| Registered electors | | 30,034 | | |
| Majority | | 13,163 | 66.57 | ▲17.51 |
| Sabah Heritage Party hold | | Swing | | |
Source(s) "RESULTS OF CONTESTED ELECTION AND STATEMENTS OF THE POLL AFTER THE OFFICIAL ADDITION OF VOTES".

Sabah state election, 2018: Kapayan
| Party | Candidate | Votes | % | ∆% |
|---|---|---|---|---|
| PH | Jannie Lasimbang | 19,558 | 70.97 | ▲70.97 |
| BN | Francis Goh Fah Shun | 6,038 | 21.91 | ▲0.49 |
| STAR | Chong Pit Fah | 1,318 | 4.78 | ▼2.80 |
| Total valid votes | | 27,184 | 98.65 | |
| Total rejected ballots | | 276 | 1.00 | |
| Unreturned ballots | | 97 | 0.35 | |
| Turnout | | 27,557 | 81.83 | ▼0.47 |
| Registered electors | | 33,675 | | |
| Majority | | 13,250 | 49.06 | ▲21.84 |
| PH hold | | Swing | | |
Source(s) "RESULTS OF CONTESTED ELECTION AND STATEMENTS OF THE POLL AFTER THE OFFICIAL ADDITION OF VOTES".

Sabah state election, 2013: Kapayan
| Party | Candidate | Votes | % | ∆% |
|---|---|---|---|---|
| DAP | Edwin Jack Bosi | 13,020 | 48.64 | ▲20.08 |
| BN | Khoo Keok Hai | 5,733 | 21.42 | ▼21.50 |
| STAR | Phillip Among @ Daniel Dell Fidelis | 2,030 | 7.58 | ▲7.58 |
| SAPP | Chong Pit Fah | 720 | 2.69 | ▲2.69 |
| Total valid votes | | 27,184 | 98.65 | |
| Total rejected ballots | | 482 | 1.80 | |
| Unreturned ballots | | 47 | 0.35 | |
| Turnout | | 22,032 | 82.30 | ▲13.02 |
| Registered electors | | 26,767 | | |
| Majority | | 7,287 | 27.22 | ▲12.86 |
| DAP gain from BN | | Swing | | ? |
Source(s) "KEPUTUSAN PILIHAN RAYA UMUM DEWAN UNDANGAN NEGERI". Archived from the original on 2022-06-29.

Sabah state election, 2008: Kapayan
| Party | Candidate | Votes | % | ∆% |
|---|---|---|---|---|
| BN | Khoo Keok Hai | 6,162 | 42.92 | ▼3.58 |
| DAP | Stephen Jacob Jimbangan | 4,100 | 28.56 | ▲16.74 |
| PKR | Chow Chin Thong @ Chau Chin Tang | 3,658 | 25.48 | ▲21.38 |
| Total valid votes | | 13,920 | 96.96 | |
| Total rejected ballots | | 200 | 1.39 | |
| Unreturned ballots | | 236 | 1.64 | |
| Turnout | | 14,356 | 69.28 | ▲5.30 |
| Registered electors | | 20,723 | | |
| Majority | | 2,062 | 14.36 | ▼12.77 |
| BN hold | | Swing | | |
Source(s) "KEPUTUSAN PILIHAN RAYA UMUM DEWAN UNDANGAN NEGERI SABAH BAGI TAHUN 2008".

Sabah state election, 2004: Kapayan
| Party | Candidate | Votes | % |
|---|---|---|---|
| BN | Khoo Keok Hai | 5,472 | 46.50 |
| Independent | Yunof @ Edward Maringking | 2,279 | 19.37 |
| DAP | Kok Thau Lin | 1,391 | 11.82 |
| Independent | Jivol @ Edmund Doudilim | 1,201 | 10.21 |
| Independent | Stephen Jacob Jimbangan | 494 | 4.20 |
| PKR | Liaw Chin Sin | 482 | 4.10 |
| PAS | Tommy Yee Chee Ming | 88 | 0.75 |
| BERSEKUTU | Edmundo Apines | 87 | 0.74 |
| Total valid votes | | 11,494 | 97.67 |
| Total rejected ballots | | 274 | 2.33 |
| Unreturned ballots | | 0 | 0.00 |
| Turnout | | 11,768 | 63.98 |
| Registered electors | | 18,393 | |
| Majority | | 3,193 | 27.13 |
This was a new constituency created.
Source(s) "KEPUTUSAN PILIHAN RAYA UMUM DEWAN UNDANGAN NEGERI SABAH BAGI TAHUN 2004".
