= Awang Ahmad Sah =

Malaysian politician (born 1959)

Yang Berhormat Datuk Awang Ahmad Sah PGDK ASDK MLA
- أواڠ أحمد صح
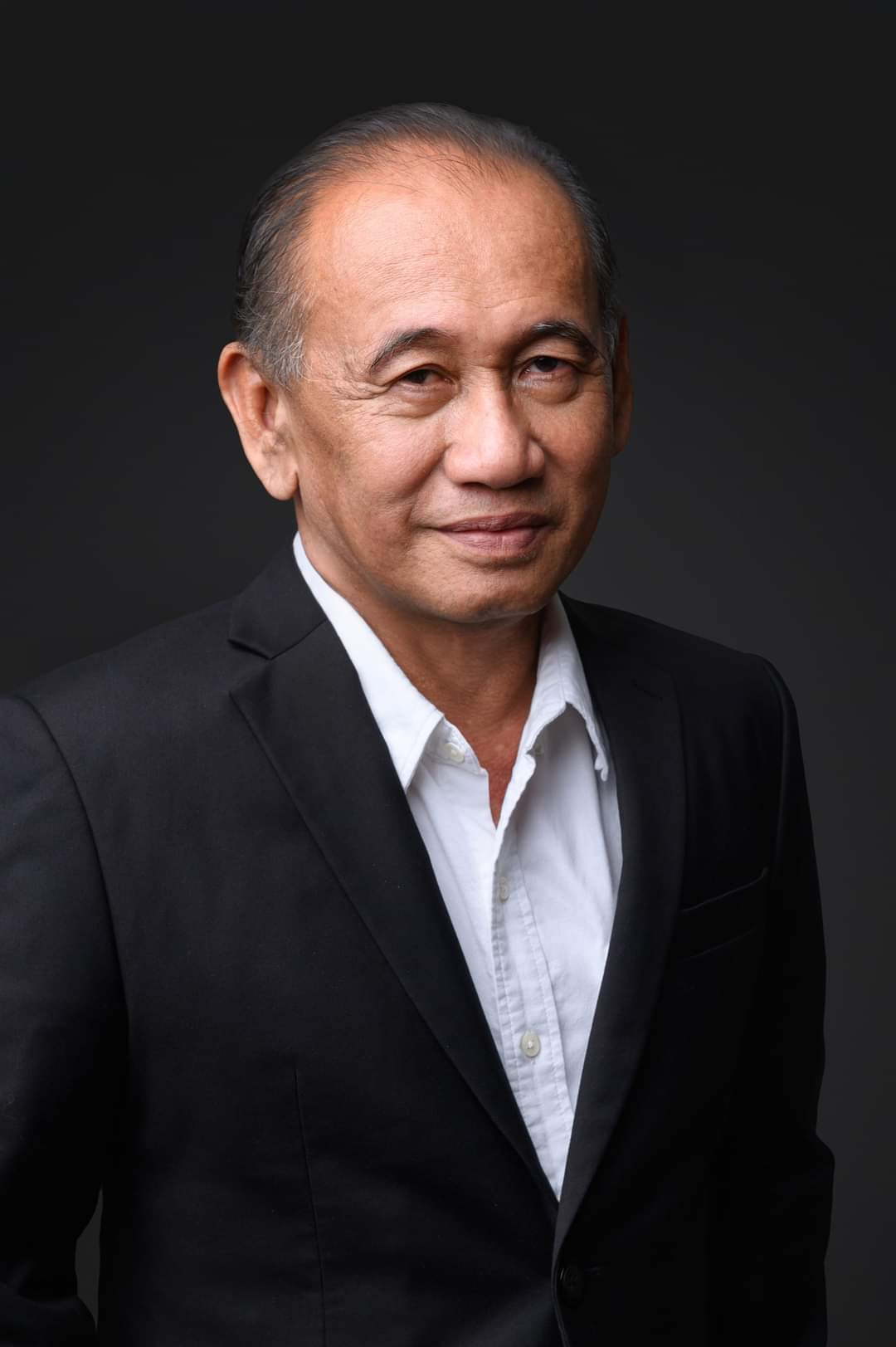

Member of the Sabah State Legislative Assembly for Petagas
- Incumbent
- Assumed office 26 September 2020
- Preceded by: Uda Sulai (WARISAN)
- Majority: 261 (2020); 1,255 (2025)

Treasurer-General of the Heritage Party
- In office 13 October 2022 – 27 February 2023
- President: Shafie Apdal
- Preceded by: Terrence Siambun
- Succeeded by: Azhar Matussin

Information Chief of the Heritage Party
- In office 16 October 2021 – 13 October 2022
- President: Shafie Apdal
- Preceded by: Yusof Yacob
- Succeeded by: Azis Jamman

Personal details
- Born: Awang Ahmad Sah; 24 July 1959 (age 67) Petagas, Putatan, Penampang, British North Borneo
- Citizenship: Malaysia
- Party: State Reform Party (STAR) (until 2020); Heritage Party (WARISAN) (2020–2023); Parti Gagasan Rakyat Sabah (GAGASAN) (2023–2025); Independent (since 2025)
- Other political affiliations: Gabungan Rakyat Sabah (GRS) (2023–2025)
- Relations: Awang Husaini Sahari (Younger brother)
- Education: Hawaii Pacific University; Southern Illinois University Carbondale
- Occupation: Politician

Awang Ahmad Sah is a Malaysian politician who has served as Member of the Sabah State Legislative Assembly (MLA) for Petagas since September 2020. He is currently an independent politician and formerly a member of the Parti Gagasan Rakyat Sabah (GAGASAN), a component party of the Gabungan Rakyat Sabah (GRS) coalition and formerly a member of the Heritage Party (WARISAN) and State Reform Party (STAR). He was the Treasurer and Division Chief of Putatan of WARISAN and Deputy Chairman of STAR.

On 27 February 2023, Awang Ahmad Sah left WARISAN for GAGASAN, becoming the 10th WARISAN MLA to leave the party since the 2020 Sabah state election.

== Education ==
He firstly studied in Buit Hill National Primary School Putatan, Penampang for his primary education and later furthered his secondary education at Sabah College, Sembulan, Kota Kinabalu. In addition, he holds a Bachelor of Arts in Political Science from Hawaii Pacific University, Master of Arts in Political Science and a Master of Science in Agriculture Economics from Southern Illinois University Carbondale, all three universities in the United States, in which he was a scholar sponsored by Yayasan Sabah.

== Election results ==
Sabah State Legislative Assembly
Year	Constituency	Candidate	Votes	Pct	Opponent(s)	Votes	Pct	Ballots cast	Majority	Turnout
2013	N18 Petagas	Awang Ahmad Sah (STAR)	1,111	8.62%	Yahya Hussin (Sabah UMNO)	8,504	66.00%	12,884	5,653	83.03%
2013	N18 Petagas	Awang Ahmad Sah (STAR)	1,111	8.62%	Mat Yunin @ Mohd Yunin Atin (PKR)	2,851	22.13%	12,884	5,653	83.03%
2020	N23 Petagas	Awang Ahmad Sah (WARISAN)	4,125	43.23%	Arsit Sedi @ Sidik (Sabah BERSATU)	3,864	40.49%	9,542	261	69.33%
2020	N23 Petagas	Awang Ahmad Sah (WARISAN)	4,125	43.23%	Paul Nointien (IND)	572	5.99%	9,542	261	69.33%
2020	N23 Petagas	Awang Ahmad Sah (WARISAN)	4,125	43.23%	Ahmad Farid Sainuri (PCS)	355	3.72%	9,542	261	69.33%
2020	N23 Petagas	Awang Ahmad Sah (WARISAN)	4,125	43.23%	Jecky Lettong @ Thaddeus Jack (LDP)	118	1.24%	9,542	261	69.33%
2020	N23 Petagas	Awang Ahmad Sah (WARISAN)	4,125	43.23%	Mohamad Kulat (GAGASAN)	33	0.35%	9,542	261	69.33%
2025	N23 Petagas	Awang Ahmad Sah (IND)	4,271	31.89%	Awang Husaini Sahari (PKR)	3,016	22.52%	13,594	1,255	67.75%
2025	N23 Petagas	Awang Ahmad Sah (IND)	4,271	31.89%	Uda Sulai (WARISAN)	2,912	21.74%	13,594	1,255	67.75%
2025	N23 Petagas	Awang Ahmad Sah (IND)	4,271	31.89%	Jason Lee Nyuk Soon (UPKO)	1,306	9.75%	13,594	1,255	67.75%
2025	N23 Petagas	Awang Ahmad Sah (IND)	4,271	31.89%	Mohd Afifi Shaiffuddin (PAS)	1,283	9.58%	13,594	1,255	67.75%
2025	N23 Petagas	Awang Ahmad Sah (IND)	4,271	31.89%	Annita Shiela F. Among (STAR)	276	2.06%	13,594	1,255	67.75%
2025	N23 Petagas	Awang Ahmad Sah (IND)	4,271	31.89%	Aslin Samat (IMPIAN)	133	0.99%	13,594	1,255	67.75%
2025	N23 Petagas	Awang Ahmad Sah (IND)	4,271	31.89%	Adelaide Cornelius (KDM)	122	0.91%	13,594	1,255	67.75%
2025	N23 Petagas	Awang Ahmad Sah (IND)	4,271	31.89%	Sabrezani Sabdin (ANAK NEGERI)	40	0.30%	13,594	1,255	67.75%
2025	N23 Petagas	Awang Ahmad Sah (IND)	4,271	31.89%	Patrick Manius (IND)	34	0.25%	13,594	1,255	67.75%

== Honours ==
- Sabah
  - Commander of the Order of Kinabalu (PGDK) – Datuk (2019)
  - Companion of the Order of Kinabalu (ASDK) (2018)
