= Pantai Manis =

State constituency in Sabah, Malaysia

Pantai Manis (N29)
Sabah constituency

State constituency
- Legislature: Sabah State Legislative Assembly
MLA
Pengiran Saifuddin Pengiran Tahir Petra
GRS
- Constituency created: 1994
- First contested: 1999
- Last contested: 2025

Demographics
- Electors (2025): 20,026

Pantai Manis is a state constituency in Sabah, Malaysia, that is represented in the Sabah State Legislative Assembly.

== Demographics ==
As of 2020, Pantai Manis has a population of 24,360 people.

Ethnic breakdown of Pantai Manis' electorate as of 2025
1. Muslim Bumiputera (88.0%)
2. Chinese (7.00%)
3. Non-Muslim Bumiputera (5.00%)
4. Other ethnicities (0.00%)

== History ==
=== Polling districts ===
According to the gazette issued on 31 October 2022, the Pantai Manis constituency has a total of 5 polling districts.

State constituency	Polling Districts	Code	Location
Pantai Manis（N29）	Buang Sayang	175/29/01	SK Buang Sayang
Pantai Manis（N29）	Kuala	175/29/02	Jabatan Pembangunan Sumber Manusia (ILTP) Papar; SK Kuala Papar
Pantai Manis（N29）	Kelanahan	175/29/03	SMK Takis
Pantai Manis（N29）	Bandar Papar	175/29/04	SMK Majakir
Pantai Manis（N29）	Benoni	175/29/05	SK Benoni

=== Representation history ===
Member of Sabah State Legislative Assembly for Pantai Manis
Assembly	No	Years	Member	Party
Constituency created from Buang Sayang, Kawang and Bongawan
11th	N19	1999 – 2004	Abdul Rahim Ismail	BN (UMNO)
12th	N22	2004 – 2008	Abdul Rahim Ismail	BN (UMNO)
13th	N22	2008 – 2013	Abdul Rahim Ismail	BN (UMNO)
14th	N22	2013 – 2018	Abdul Rahim Ismail	BN (UMNO)
15th	N22	2018 – 2020	Aidi Moktar	WARISAN
16th	N29	2020 – 2025	Mohd. Tamin Zainal	BN (UMNO)
17th	N29	2025–present	Pengiran Saifuddin Pengiran Tahir Petra	GRS (GAGASAN)

== Election results ==
Sabah state election, 2025: Pantai Manis
Party	Candidate	Votes	%	∆%
GRS	Pengiran Saifuddin Pengiran Tahir Petra	6,755	45.50	▲45.50
BN	Redzuan Ismail	4,624	31.15	▲17.57
Heritage	Aidi Moktar	2,531	17.05	▼25.14
PN	Faizal Julaili	444	2.99	▲2.99
KDM	Mohamad Tamin	239	1.61	▲1.61
Homeland Solidarity Party	Richard Vitales @ Charles	132	0.89	▲0.89
Sabah Dream Party	Mohamad Azzmi Ahmad	121	0.82	▲0.82
Total valid votes		14,846		
Total rejected ballots		195		
Unreturned ballots		30		
Turnout		15,071	75.26	▲1.95
Registered electors		20,026		
Majority		2,131	14.35	▲7.82
GRS gain from BN		Swing		-
Source(s) "RESULTS OF CONTESTED ELECTION AND STATEMENTS OF THE POLL AFTER THE OFFICIAL ADDITION OF VOTES" (PDF).

Sabah state election, 2020: Pantai Manis
Party	Candidate	Votes	%	∆%
BN	Mohd. Tamin Zainal	5,116	48.72	▲7.33
Sabah Heritage Party	Yahiya Ag Kahar	4,430	42.19	▼11.44
Love Sabah Party	Fauzi Ibrahim	499	4.75	▲4.00
USNO (Baru)	Ag Damit @ Ag Sahzain Pg Abdul Razak	151	1.44	▲1.44
LDP	Mazreca John	127	1.21	▲1.21
Total valid votes		10,323	98.31	
Total rejected ballots		132	1.26	
Unreturned ballots		45	0.43	
Turnout		10,500	73.31	▼10.74
Registered electors		14,322		
Majority		686	6.53	▼5.71
BN gain from Sabah Heritage Party		Swing		?
Source(s) "RESULTS OF CONTESTED ELECTION AND STATEMENTS OF THE POLL AFTER THE OFFICIAL ADDITION OF VOTES".

Sabah state election, 2018: Pantai Manis
Party	Candidate	Votes	%	∆%
Sabah Heritage Party	Aidi Moktar	9,234	53.63	▲53.63
BN	Abdul Rahim Ismail	7,126	41.39	▼18.35
Sabah People's Hope Party	James @ Ebi Ghani	448	2.60	▲2.60
Love Sabah Party	Jawasing Mianus @ Herman J Mianus	129	0.75	▲0.75
Total valid votes		16,937	98.37	
Total rejected ballots		227	1.32	
Unreturned ballots		53	0.31	
Turnout		17,217	84.05	▼1.45
Registered electors		20,484		
Majority		2,108	12.24	▼15.08
Sabah Heritage Party gain from BN		Swing		?
Source(s) "RESULTS OF CONTESTED ELECTION AND STATEMENTS OF THE POLL AFTER THE OFFICIAL ADDITION OF VOTES".

Sabah state election, 2013: Pantai Manis
Party	Candidate	Votes	%	∆%
BN	Abdul Rahim Ismail	9,639	59.74	▲3.53
PKR	Fred Gabriel	5,230	32.42	▼1.52
STAR	Baharudin @ Baharuddin Nayan	603	3.74	▲3.74
SAPP	Noraizal Mohd Noor	403	2.50	▲2.50
Total valid votes		15,875	98.39	
Total rejected ballots		239	1.48	
Unreturned ballots		20	0.12	
Turnout		16,134	85.50	▲8.50
Registered electors		18,870		
Majority		4,409	27.32	▲5.05
BN hold		Swing		
Source(s) "KEPUTUSAN PILIHAN RAYA UMUM DEWAN UNDANGAN NEGERI".

Sabah state election, 2008: Pantai Manis
Party	Candidate	Votes	%	∆%
BN	Abdul Rahim Ismail	7,223	56.21	
PKR	Ag Bakar Ag Hussain	4,361	33.94	
BERSEKUTU	Welfred Kilos	579	4.51	
Independent	Mohd Hashim Yussup @ Yusof	130	1.01	
Total valid votes		12,293	95.67	
Total rejected ballots		278	2.16	
Unreturned ballots		279	2.17	
Turnout		12,850	77.00	
Registered electors		16,688		
Majority		2,862	22.27	
BN hold		Swing		
Source(s) "KEPUTUSAN PILIHAN RAYA UMUM DEWAN UNDANGAN NEGERI SABAH BAGI TAHUN 2008".

Sabah state election, 2004: Pantai Manis
Party	Candidate	Votes	%	∆%
On the nomination day, Abdul Rahim Ismail won uncontested.
BN	Abdul Rahim Ismail			
Total valid votes				
Total rejected ballots				
Unreturned ballots				
Turnout				
Registered electors		16,651		
Majority				
BN hold		Swing		
Source(s) "KEPUTUSAN PILIHAN RAYA UMUM DEWAN UNDANGAN NEGERI SABAH BAGI TAHUN 2004".

Sabah state election, 1999: Pantai Manis
Party	Candidate	Votes	%
BN	Abdul Rahim Ismail	7,357	57.22
PBS	Juani @ Johnny Mositun	4,823	37.51
BERSEKUTU	Mohd Ishak Laimudin	458	3.56
SETIA	Zainuddin Mohamed	143	1.11
Total valid votes		12,781	99.40
Total rejected ballots		77	0.60
Unreturned ballots		0	0.00
Turnout		12,858	79.70
Registered electors		16,132	
Majority		2,534	19.71
This was a new constituency created.
Source(s) "KEPUTUSAN PILIHAN RAYA UMUM DEWAN UNDANGAN NEGERI SABAH BAGI TAHUN 1999".
