= Tan Lee Fatt =

Malaysian politician

Yang Berhormat Datuk Tan Lee Fatt PGDK
- 陈历发

State Assistant Minister of Finance of Sabah
- In office 26 January 2023 – 1 December 2025 Serving with Julita Majungki
- Governor: Juhar Mahiruddin (2023–2024); Musa Aman (2025)
- Chief Minister: Hajiji Noor
- State Minister: Masidi Manjun
- Preceded by: Jasnih Daya
- Constituency: Likas

Member of the Sabah State Legislative Assembly for Likas
- In office 9 May 2018 – 29 November 2025
- Preceded by: Junz Wong (DAP)
- Succeeded by: Tham Yun Fook (WARISAN)
- Majority: 7,902 (2018); 7,517 (2020)

Personal details
- Born: Tan Lee Fatt Sabah, Malaysia
- Citizenship: Malaysia
- Party: Democratic Action Party (DAP)
- Other political affiliations: Pakatan Harapan (PH)
- Spouse: Shevena Jumin Jeffrey
- Occupation: Politician

Tan Lee Fatt

Chinese name
- Traditional Chinese: 陳歷發
- Simplified Chinese: 陈历发
Transcriptions
Standard Mandarin
- Hanyu Pinyin: Chén Lìfā
Hakka
- Pha̍k-fa-sṳ: Chhìn Li̍t-fat

Tan Lee Fatt is a Malaysian politician who served as the State Assistant Minister of Finance of Sabah in the Gabungan Rakyat Sabah (GRS) administration under Chief Minister Hajiji Noor and Minister Masidi Manjun from January 2023 to December 2025 and Member of the Sabah State Legislative Assembly (MLA) for Likas from May 2018 to November 2025. He is a member and State Assistant Secretary of Sabah of the Democratic Action Party (DAP), a component party of the Pakatan Harapan (PH) coalition.

== Election results ==
Sabah State Legislative Assembly
Year	Constituency	Candidate	Votes	Pct.	Opponent(s)	Votes	Pct.	Ballots cast	Majority	Turnout
2018	N14 Likas	Tan Lee Fatt (DAP)	9,163	81.67%	Chin Shu Ying (LDP)	1,261	11.24%	11,219	7,902	73.73%
2018	N14 Likas	Tan Lee Fatt (DAP)	9,163	81.67%	Yong We Keong (SAPP)	673	6.00%	11,219	7,902	73.73%
2020	N19 Likas	Tan Lee Fatt (DAP)	8,173	85.55%	Chan Kee Ying (MCA)	656	6.87%	9,554	7,517	63.39
2020	N19 Likas	Tan Lee Fatt (DAP)	8,173	85.55%	Sim Fui (LDP)	276	2.89%	9,554	7,517	63.39
2020	N19 Likas	Tan Lee Fatt (DAP)	8,173	85.55%	Lu Siew See (PCS)	164	1.72%	9,554	7,517	63.39
2020	N19 Likas	Tan Lee Fatt (DAP)	8,173	85.55%	Chia Chui Kiet (IND)	95	0.99%	9,554	7,517	63.39
2020	N19 Likas	Tan Lee Fatt (DAP)	8,173	85.55%	Daniel Isaac Hoong (USNO Baru)	81	0.85%	9,554	7,517	63.39
2020	N19 Likas	Tan Lee Fatt (DAP)	8,173	85.55%	Cong Chee Vui (PPRS)	22	0.23%	9,554	7,517	63.39

== Honours ==
- Sabah
  - Commander of the Order of Kinabalu (PGDK) – Datuk (2024)
  - Companion of the Order of Kinabalu (ASDK) (2018)
