= Aidi Moktar =

Malaysian politician

Yang Berbahagia Datuk Aidi Moktar PGDK
- عيدي مختار

State Minister of Law and Native Affairs of Sabah
- In office 16 May 2018 – 29 September 2020
- Governor: Juhar Mahiruddin
- Chief Minister: Shafie Apdal
- Assistant: Uda Sulai
- Preceded by: Position established
- Succeeded by: Position abolished
- Constituency: Pantai Manis

Member of the Sabah State Legislative Assembly for Pantai Manis
- In office 9 May 2018 – 2020
- Preceded by: Abdul Rahim Ismail (BN–UMNO)
- Succeeded by: Mohd. Tamin Zainal (BN–UMNO)
- Majority: 2,108 (2018)

Faction represented in Sabah State Legislative Assembly
- 2018–2020: Sabah Heritage Party

Personal details
- Born: Aidi bin Moktar; 11 April 1955 (age 71) Papar, Crown Colony of North Borneo (now Sabah, Malaysia)
- Citizenship: Malaysian
- Party: Sabah Heritage Party (Barisan Nasional (BN)WARISAN)
- Other political affiliations: (−2018)
- Occupation: Politician

Aidi bin Moktar is a Malaysian politician who has been the State Minister of Law and Native Affairs. He served as the Member of Sabah State Legislative Assembly (MLA) for Pantai Manis from May 2018 until September 2020. He is a member of the Sabah Heritage Party (WARISAN).

== Election results ==
Sabah State Legislative Assembly
Year	Constituency	Candidate	Votes	Pct	Opponent(s)	Votes	Pct	Ballots cast	Majority	Turnout
2018	N22 Pantai Manis	Aidi Moktar (WARISAN)	9,234	54.52%	Abdul Rahim Ismail (UMNO)	7,126	42.07%	17,217	2,108	84.10%
2018	N22 Pantai Manis	Aidi Moktar (WARISAN)	9,234	54.52%	James Ghani (PHRS)	448	2.65%	17,217	2,108	84.10%
2018	N22 Pantai Manis	Aidi Moktar (WARISAN)	9,234	54.52%	Jawasing Mianus (PCS)	129	0.76%	17,217	2,108	84.10%

== Honours ==
- Sabah
  - Commander of the Order of Kinabalu (PGDK) – Datuk (2001)
