= Likas (state constituency) =

State constituency in Sabah, Malaysia

Likas (N19)
Sabah constituency

State constituency
- Legislature: Sabah State Legislative Assembly
MLA
Tham Yun Fook
Heritage
- Constituency created: 1976
- First contested: 1974
- Last contested: 2025

Demographics
- Electors (2025): 19,100

Likas is a state constituency in Sabah, Malaysia, that has been represented in the Sabah State Legislative Assembly. It is mandated to return a single member to the Assembly under the first-past-the-post voting system.

== Polling districts ==
As at 12 February 2016, this constituency contains the polling districts of Bandar Utara, Bandar Selatan, Likas Barat, Likas, Likas Tengah, Likas Selatan, Likas Park and Dah Yeh Villa.

== Demographics ==
As of 2020, Likas has a population of 38,800 people.

Ethnic breakdown of Likas' electorate as of 2025
1. Chinese (48.0%)
2. Non-Muslim Bumiputera (36.0%)
3. Muslim Bumiputera (15.0%)
4. Other ethnicities (1.00%)

== History ==
=== Polling districts ===
According to the gazette issued on 31 October 2022, the Likas constituency has a total of 8 polling districts.

State constituency	Polling Districts	Code	Location
Likas (N19)	Bandar Utara	172/19/01	Dewan Serbaguna Kompleks Sukan Likas
Likas (N19)	Bandar Selatan	172/19/02	Kolej Vokasional Likas
Likas (N19)	Likas Barat	172/19/03	SMK Perempuan Likas
Likas (N19)	Likas	172/19/04	SK St. Agnes
Likas (N19)	Likas Tengah	172/19/05	SJK (C) St. James Likas
Likas (N19)	Likas Selatan	172/19/06	SM Kian Kok
Likas (N19)	Likas Park	172/19/07	SMK Likas
Likas (N19)	Dah Yeh Villa	172/19/08	SM Tshung Tsin Sabah

=== Representation history ===
Member of Sabah State Legislative Assembly for Likas
Assembly	No	Years	Member	Party
Constituency renamed from Jesselton Bandar
5th	N19	1976 – 1981	Wong Yau Ket (黄耀国)	BERJAYA
6th	N19	1981 – 1985	Chin Kok Kong (陈国光)	BN (BERJAYA)
7th	N28	1985 – 1986	Yong Teck Lee (杨德利)	PBS
8th	N28	1986 – 1990	Yong Teck Lee (杨德利)	PBS
9th	N28	1990 – 1994	Yong Teck Lee (杨德利)	GR (PBS)
10th	N28	1994 – 1999	Yong Teck Lee (杨德利)	BN (SAPP)
11th	N13	1999 – 2004	Yong Teck Lee (杨德利)	BN (SAPP)
12th	N14	2004 – 2008	Liew Teck Chan (刘德泉)	BN (SAPP)
13th	N14	2008	Liew Teck Chan (刘德泉)	BN (SAPP)
13th	N14	2008 – 2013	Liew Teck Chan (刘德泉)	SAPP
14th	N14	2013 – 2015	Junz Wong (王鸿俊)	DAP
14th	N14	2015 – 2016	Junz Wong (王鸿俊)	PH (DAP)
14th	N14	2016	Junz Wong (王鸿俊)	Independent
14th	N14	2016 – 2018	Junz Wong (王鸿俊)	WARISAN
15th	N14	2018 – 2020	Tan Lee Fatt (陈历发)	PH (DAP)
16th	N19	2020 – 2025	Tan Lee Fatt (陈历发)	PH (DAP)
17th	N19	2025–present	Tham Yun Fook (谭永福)	WARISAN

== Election results ==
Sabah state election, 2025
Party	Candidate	Votes	%	∆%
Heritage	Tham Yun Fook	5,768	56.31	▼29.24
PH	Phoong Jin Zhe	3,343	32.64	▲32.64
SAPP	Yong Yit Jee	837	8.17	▲8.17
Sabah Dream Party	Louis Yong Yin Loong	209	2.04	▲2.04
PBK	Candy Chiew	44	0.43	▲0.43
Sabah Nationality Party	Ku Yuk Cheong	42	0.41	▲0.41
Total valid votes		10,243		
Total rejected ballots		76		
Unreturned ballots		25		
Turnout		10,344	54.16	▼9.23
Registered electors		19,100		
Majority		2,425	23.67	▼55.01
Heritage hold		Swing		
Source(s) "RESULTS OF CONTESTED ELECTION AND STATEMENTS OF THE POLL AFTER THE OFFICIAL ADDITION OF VOTES" (PDF).

Sabah state election, 2020
Party	Candidate	Votes	%	∆%
Sabah Heritage Party	Tan Lee Fatt	8,173	85.55	▲85.55
BN	Chang Kee Ying	656	6.87	▼4.37
LDP	Sim Fui	276	2.89	▲2.89
Love Sabah Party	Lu Siaw Wee	164	1.72	▲1.72
Independent	Chia Chui Ket	95	0.99	▲0.99
USNO (Baru)	Daniel Isaac Hoong	81	0.85	▲0.85
Sabah People's Unity Party	Chong Chee Vui	22	0.23	▲0.23
Total valid votes		9,467	99.09	
Total rejected ballots		71	0.74	
Unreturned ballots		16	0.17	
Turnout		9,554	63.39	▼10.34
Registered electors		14,934		
Majority		7,517	78.68	▲8.25
Sabah Heritage Party hold		Swing		
Source(s) "RESULTS OF CONTESTED ELECTION AND STATEMENTS OF THE POLL AFTER THE OFFICIAL ADDITION OF VOTES".

Sabah state election, 2018
Party	Candidate	Votes	%	∆%
PH	Tan Lee Fatt	9,163	81.67	▲81.67
BN	Chin Shu Ying	1,261	11.24	▼6.82
SAPP	Yong We Kong	673	6.00	▼6.82
Total valid votes		11,097	98.91	
Total rejected ballots		84	0.75	
Unreturned ballots		38	0.34	
Turnout		11,219	73.73	▼2.07
Registered electors		15,216		
Majority		7,902	70.43	▲21.69
PH hold		Swing		
Source(s) "RESULTS OF CONTESTED ELECTION AND STATEMENTS OF THE POLL AFTER THE OFFICIAL ADDITION OF VOTES".

Sabah state election, 2013
Party	Candidate	Votes	%	∆%
DAP	Junz Wong	7,746	66.80	▲32.82
BN	Chin Shu Ying	2,094	18.06	▼24.98
SAPP	Yong Teck Lee	1,487	12.82	▲12.82
Independent	Ho Cheong Tshun	155	1.34	▲1.34
Total valid votes		11,482	99.02	
Total rejected ballots		99	0.85	
Unreturned ballots		15	0.13	
Turnout		11,596	75.80	▲13.08
Registered electors		15,294		
Majority		5,652	48.74	▲39.68
DAP gain from BN		Swing		?
Source(s) "KEPUTUSAN PILIHAN RAYA UMUM DEWAN UNDANGAN NEGERI". Archived from the original on 2022-06-28.

Sabah state election, 2008
Party	Candidate	Votes	%	∆%
BN	Liew Teck Chan	4,097	43.04	▼28.94
DAP	Joan Goh Penn Nee	3,235	33.98	▲33.98
PKR	Yap Siew Kiong	1,888	19.83	▼6.42
Independent	Kong Yu Kiong	182	1.91	▲1.91
Total valid votes		9,402	98.77	
Total rejected ballots		111	1.17	
Unreturned ballots		6	0.06	
Turnout		9,519	62.72	▲5.20
Registered electors		15,178		
Majority		862	9.06	▼36.67
BN hold		Swing		
Source(s) "KEPUTUSAN PILIHAN RAYA UMUM DEWAN UNDANGAN NEGERI SABAH BAGI TAHUN 2008".

Sabah state election, 2004
Party	Candidate	Votes	%	∆%
BN	Liew Teck Chan	6,286	71.98	▲20.56
PKR	Kong Yu Kiong	2,293	26.25	▲26.25
Total valid votes		8,579	98.24	
Total rejected ballots		134	1.53	
Unreturned ballots		20	0.23	
Turnout		8,733	57.52	▼10.69
Registered electors		15,182		
Majority		3,993	45.73	▲17.72
BN hold		Swing		
Source(s) "KEPUTUSAN PILIHAN RAYA UMUM DEWAN UNDANGAN NEGERI SABAH BAGI TAHUN 2004".

Sabah state election, 1999
Party	Candidate	Votes	%	∆%
BN	Yong Teck Lee	9,110	51.42	▼5.85
PBS	Chong Eng Leong	4,148	23.41	▼18.32
BERSEKUTU	Harris Salleh	3,576	20.18	▲20.18
SETIA	Gamparan Lajah	318	1.79	▲1.79
PAS	Yahya Kassim	200	1.13	▲1.13
Independent	Saudin Kadis	100	0.56	▲0.56
Total valid votes		17,452	98.50	
Total rejected ballots		265	1.50	
Unreturned ballots		0	0.00	
Turnout		17,717	68.21	▼2.81
Registered electors		25,976		
Majority		4,962	28.01	▲12.47
BN hold		Swing		
Source(s) "KEPUTUSAN PILIHAN RAYA UMUM DEWAN UNDANGAN NEGERI SABAH BAGI TAHUN 1999".

Sabah state election, 1994
Party	Candidate	Votes	%	∆%
BN	Yong Teck Lee	8,035	57.27	▲57.27
PBS	Yee Moh Chai	5,855	41.73	▼24.75
Total valid votes		13,890	99.00	
Total rejected ballots		140	1.00	
Unreturned ballots		0	0.00	
Turnout		14,030	71.02	▼0.50
Registered electors		19,756		
Majority		2,180	15.54	▼30.86
BN gain from PBS		Swing		?
Source(s) "KEPUTUSAN PILIHAN RAYA UMUM DEWAN UNDANGAN NEGERI SABAH BAGI TAHUN 1994".

Sabah state election, 1990
Party	Candidate	Votes	%	∆%
PBS	Yong Teck Lee	7,347	66.48	▼0.74
USNO	Hussin Wahid Dally	2,219	20.08	▲20.08
BERJAYA	Yan Ngai Nen	626	5.66	▼24.50
DAP	Quek Yi Than	416	3.76	▲3.76
PRS	Frankie Yapp Lai Sing	176	1.59	▲1.59
LDP	Chin Nyuk Fatt	176	1.59	▲1.59
Total valid votes		10,960	99.17	
Total rejected ballots		92	0.83	
Unreturned ballots		0	0.00	
Turnout		11,052	71.52	
Registered electors		15,453		
Majority		5,128	46.40	▲9.34
PBS hold		Swing		
Source(s) "KEPUTUSAN PILIHAN RAYA UMUM DEWAN UNDANGAN NEGERI SABAH BAGI TAHUN 1990".

Sabah state election, 1986
Party	Candidate	Votes	%	∆%
PBS	Yong Teck Lee	6,488	67.75	▲26.79
BERJAYA	Chin Kok Kong	2,911	30.40	▼7.26
Sabah Chinese Party	Chu Yee Ming @ Jeffrey	140	1.46	▲1.46
SCCP	Kok Fung Chong	38	0.40	▲0.40
Total valid votes		9,577	100.00	
Total rejected ballots		75		
Unreturned ballots		0		
Turnout		9,652	73.54	▲0.53
Registered electors		13,125		
Majority		3,577	37.35	▲34.05
PBS hold		Swing		
Source(s) "KEPUTUSAN PILIHAN RAYA UMUM DEWAN UNDANGAN NEGERI SABAH BAGI TAHUN 1986".

Sabah state election, 1985
Party	Candidate	Votes	%	∆%
PBS	Yong Teck Lee	3,368	40.96	▲40.96
BERJAYA	Chin Kok Kong	3,097	37.66	▼42.33
USNO	Saidon Kadis	1,529	18.59	▲18.59
Independent	Lim Ting Yee	195	2.37	▲2.37
BERSIH	Angkoh Adan	34	0.41	▲0.41
Total valid votes		8,223	100.00	
Total rejected ballots		119		
Unreturned ballots		0		
Turnout		8,342	73.01	▲1.70
Registered electors		11,426		
Majority		271	3.30	▼56.68
PBS gain from BERJAYA		Swing		-

Sabah state election, 1981
Party	Candidate	Votes	%	∆%
BERJAYA	Chin Kok Kong	6,951	79.99	▲4.95
PUSAKA	Abdul Salim Berunai	1,739	20.01	▲20.01
Total valid votes		8,690	100.00	
Total rejected ballots		114		
Unreturned ballots		0		
Turnout		8,804	71.30	▼4.50
Registered electors		12,347		
Majority		5,212	59.98	▲8.13
BERJAYA hold		Swing		-

Sabah state election, 1976
Party	Candidate	Votes	%
BERJAYA	Wong Yau Ket	4,119	75.04
USNO	Chau Tet On	1,273	23.19
PEKEMAS	Kok Fung Chong	97	1.77
Total valid votes		5,489	100.00
Total rejected ballots		71	
Unreturned ballots		0	
Turnout		5,560	75.80
Registered electors		7,335	
Majority		2,846	51.85
This was a new constituency created
