= Junz Wong =

Malaysian politician (born 1979)

Yang Berhormat Datuk Junz Wong Hong Jun PGDK MLA
- 王鸿俊

State Minister of Agriculture and Food Industries of Sabah
- In office 16 May 2018 – 29 September 2020
- Governor: Juhar Mahiruddin
- Chief Minister: Shafie Apdal
- Assistant: Daud Yusof
- Preceded by: Jeffrey Kitingan
- Succeeded by: Jeffrey Kitingan (State Minister of Agriculture and Fisheries)
- Constituency: Tanjung Aru

Member of the Sabah State Legislative Assembly for Tanjung Aru
- Incumbent
- Assumed office 9 May 2018
- Preceded by: Edward Yong Oui Fah (BN–PBS)
- Majority: 4,610 (2018); 3,147 (2020); 3,588 (2025)

Member of the Sabah State Legislative Assembly for Likas
- In office 5 May 2013 – 9 May 2018
- Preceded by: Liew Teck Chan (BN–MCA)
- Succeeded by: Tan Lee Fatt (PH–DAP)
- Majority: 5,652 (2013)

Vice President of the Heritage Party
- Incumbent
- Assumed office 17 October 2016 Serving with: Jaujan Sambakong &; Peter Anthony (until 2021) &; Terrence Siambun (since 2022) &; Daud Yusof (Appointed, since 2023)
- President: Shafie Apdal

Faction represented in Sabah State Legislative Assembly
- 2013–2016: Democratic Action Party
- 2016–: Heritage Party

Personal details
- Born: Junz Wong Hong Jun; 27 September 1979 (age 47) Likas, Kota Kinabalu, Sabah, Malaysia
- Party: Democratic Action Party (DAP) (2013–2016); Heritage Party (WARISAN) (since 2016)
- Other political affiliations: Pakatan Rakyat (PR) (2013–2015); Pakatan Harapan (PH) (2015–2016)
- Spouse: Liau Shui Fong
- Education: Charles Sturt University
- Occupation: Politician

Junz Wong

Chinese name
- Traditional Chinese: 王鴻俊
- Simplified Chinese: 王鸿俊
Transcriptions
Standard Mandarin
- Hanyu Pinyin: Wáng Hóngjùn

Wong Hong Jun or commonly known as Junz Wong; simplified Chinese: 王鸿俊; traditional Chinese: 王鴻俊; pinyin: Wáng Hóngjùn) is a Malaysian politician who served as the State Minister of Agriculture and Food Industries of Sabah in the Heritage Party (WARISAN) administration under former Chief Minister Shafie Apdal from May 2018 to the collapse of the WARISAN administration in September 2020, as well as Member of the Sabah State Legislative Assembly (MLA) for Tanjung Aru since May 2018. He previously served as MLA for Likas from May 2013 to May 2018. He is a member and one of the Vice Presidents of WARISAN and formerly a member of the Democratic Action Party (DAP), a component party of the Pakatan Harapan (PH) and formerly Pakatan Rakyat (PR) coalitions.

== Election results ==
Sabah State Legislative Assembly
Year	Constituency	Candidate	Votes	Pct	Opponent(s)	Votes	Pct	Ballots cast	Majority	Turnout
2013	N14 Likas	Junz Wong Hong Jun (DAP)	7,746	67.46%	Chin Shu Ying (LDP)	2,094	18.24%	11,581	5,652	75.80%
2013	N14 Likas	Junz Wong Hong Jun (DAP)	7,746	67.46%	Yong Teck Lee (SAPP)	1,487	12.95%	11,581	5,652	75.80%
2013	N14 Likas	Junz Wong Hong Jun (DAP)	7,746	67.46%	Ho Cheong Tshun (STAR)	155	1.35%	11,581	5,652	75.80%
2018	N17 Tanjong Aru	Junz Wong Hong Jun (WARISAN)	9,794	58.15%	Edward Yong Oui Fah (PBS)	5,184	30.77%	17,871	4,610	75.00%
2018	N17 Tanjong Aru	Junz Wong Hong Jun (WARISAN)	9,794	58.15%	Hamid Ismail (PAS)	807	4.79%	17,871	4,610	75.00%
2018	N17 Tanjong Aru	Junz Wong Hong Jun (WARISAN)	9,794	58.15%	Noraiza Mohammad Noor (PHRS)	566	3.36%	17,871	4,610	75.00%
2018	N17 Tanjong Aru	Junz Wong Hong Jun (WARISAN)	9,794	58.15%	Roger Chong Wei Leung (ANAK NEGERI)	494	2.93%	17,871	4,610	75.00%
2020	N22 Tanjung Aru	Junz Wong Hong Jun (WARISAN)	5,685	60.34%	Mohd Reduan Aklee (Sabah UMNO)	2,538	26.94%	9,421	3,147	63.05%
2020	N22 Tanjung Aru	Junz Wong Hong Jun (WARISAN)	5,685	60.34%	Edward Yong Oui Fah (PBS)	647	6.87%	9,421	3,147	63.05%
2020	N22 Tanjung Aru	Junz Wong Hong Jun (WARISAN)	5,685	60.34%	Noran Addy Sukiran (PCS)	241	2.56%	9,421	3,147	63.05%
2020	N22 Tanjung Aru	Junz Wong Hong Jun (WARISAN)	5,685	60.34%	Ibrahim Okk Mohd Laiman Diki (LDP)	179	1.90%	9,421	3,147	63.05%
2020	N22 Tanjung Aru	Junz Wong Hong Jun (WARISAN)	5,685	60.34%	Shaffic Riasib Shah (USNO Baru)	88	0.93%	9,421	3,147	63.05%
2020	N22 Tanjung Aru	Junz Wong Hong Jun (WARISAN)	5,685	60.34%	Rizawani Fiona Heng (GAGASAN)	25	0.27%	9,421	3,147	63.05%
2020	N22 Tanjung Aru	Junz Wong Hong Jun (WARISAN)	5,685	60.34%	Jan Chow Yee Fah (IND)	18	0.19%	9,421	3,147	63.05%
2025	N22 Tanjung Aru	Junz Wong Hong Jun (WARISAN)	6,120	47.68%	Chan Foong Hin (DAP)	2,532	19.73	3,588	13,182	62.09%
2025	N22 Tanjung Aru	Junz Wong Hong Jun (WARISAN)	6,120	47.68%	Ritchie Jay Cheng (IND)	1,164	9.07%	3,588	13,182	62.09%
2025	N22 Tanjung Aru	Junz Wong Hong Jun (WARISAN)	6,120	47.68%	Dennison R Indang (UPKO)	1,046	8.15%	3,588	13,182	62.09%
2025	N22 Tanjung Aru	Junz Wong Hong Jun (WARISAN)	6,120	47.68%	Suhaimi Buang (Sabah BERSATU)	740	5.77%	3,588	13,182	62.09%
2025	N22 Tanjung Aru	Junz Wong Hong Jun (WARISAN)	6,120	47.68%	Mohamed Zaim Ansawi (IND)	494	3.85%	3,588	13,182	62.09%
2025	N22 Tanjung Aru	Junz Wong Hong Jun (WARISAN)	6,120	47.68%	Loh Ee Eng (PBK)	346	2.70%	3,588	13,182	62.09%
2025	N22 Tanjung Aru	Junz Wong Hong Jun (WARISAN)	6,120	47.68%	Hiew Choon Yu (STAR)	249	1.94%	3,588	13,182	62.09%
2025	N22 Tanjung Aru	Junz Wong Hong Jun (WARISAN)	6,120	47.68%	Yee Wee Ping (IMPIAN)	144	1.12%	3,588	13,182	62.09%

== Honours ==
- Sabah
  - Commander of the Order of Kinabalu (PGDK) – Datuk (2018)
