= Shahelmey Yahya =

Malaysian politician

Yang Berhormat Datuk Shahelmey Yahya PGDK ADK BSK JP MP
- شاه حلمي يحيى

Deputy Chief Minister of Sabah III
- In office 11 January 2023 – 30 November 2025 Serving with Jeffrey Kitingan (Deputy Chief Minister I) & Joachim Gunsalam (Deputy Chief Minister II)
- Governor: Juhar Mahiruddin (2023–2024); Musa Aman (since 2025)
- Chief Minister: Hajiji Noor
- Preceded by: Joachim Gunsalam
- Succeeded by: Ewon Benedick
- Constituency: Tanjung Keramat

State Minister of Works of Sabah
- In office 11 January 2023 – 30 November 2025
- Governor: Juhar Mahiruddin (2023–2024); Musa Aman (since 2025)
- Chief Minister: Hajiji Noor
- Assistant: Limus Jury & Robert Tawik
- Preceded by: Bung Moktar Radin
- Succeeded by: Joachim Gunsalam
- Constituency: Tanjung Keramat

State Minister of Community Development and People's Wellbeing of Sabah
- In office 08 October 2020 – 11 January 2023
- Governor: Juhar Mahiruddin
- Chief Minister: Hajiji Noor
- Assistant: Julita Majungki (2020–2022); Flovia Ng (2022–2023)
- Preceded by: Poon Ming Fung (State Minister of Health and People's Wellbeing of Sabah)
- Succeeded by: James Ratib
- Constituency: Tanjung Keramat

Member of the Malaysian Parliament for Putatan
- Incumbent
- Assumed office 19 November 2022
- Preceded by: Awang Husaini Sahari (PH–PKR)
- Majority: 124 (2022)

Member of the Sabah State Legislative Assembly for Tanjung Keramat
- In office 26 September 2020 – 29 November 2025
- Preceded by: Position established
- Succeeded by: Shah Alfie Yahya Ahmad Shah (GRS–GAGASAN)
- Majority: 1,124 (2020)

Faction represented in Dewan Rakyat
- 2022–: Barisan Nasional

Faction represented in the Sabah State Legislative Assembly
- 2020–: Barisan Nasional

Personal details
- Born: Shahelmey bin Yahya; 20 February 1973 (age 53) Putatan, Penampang, Sabah, Malaysia
- Citizenship: Malaysia
- Party: United Malays National Organisation (UMNO) (suspended: 2023–2029)
- Other political affiliations: Barisan Nasional (BN); Gabungan Rakyat Sabah (GRS)
- Spouse: Dayang Siti Noor Hayyat Awang Mohd Saufi
- Education: University of Bristol; Bachelor of Engineering; Universiti Teknologi MARA; Master of Business Administration
- Occupation: Politician
- Profession: Engineer

Shahelmey bin Yahya (born 20 February 1973) is a Malaysian politician who has served as the Deputy Chief Minister III and State Minister of Works of Sabah in the Gabungan Rakyat Sabah (GRS) state administration under Chief Minister Hajiji Noor since January 2023, Member of Parliament (MP) for Putatan since November 2022 and Member of the Sabah State Legislative Assembly (MLA) for Tanjung Keramat since September 2020. He served as the State Minister of Community Development and People's Wellbeing in GRS administration under Hajiji from October 2020 to his promotion to deputy chief ministership and switch of ministerial portfolio in January 2023. He is a member of the United Malays National Organisation (UMNO), a component party of the Barisan Nasional (BN) coalition.

== Election results ==
Sabah State Legislative Assembly
| Year | Constituency | Candidate | Votes | Pct | Opponent(s) | Votes | Pct | Ballots cast | Majority | Turnout |
|---|---|---|---|---|---|---|---|---|---|---|
| 2020 | N24 Tanjung Keramat | Shahelmey Yahya (UMNO) | 4,594 | 51.75% | Rosdy Wasli (AMANAH) | 3,470 | 39.08% | 10,482 | 1,124 | 76.98% |
| 2020 | N24 Tanjung Keramat | Shahelmey Yahya (UMNO) | 4,594 | 51.75% | Ira Uzair (PCS) | 363 | 4.09% | 10,482 | 1,124 | 76.98% |
| 2020 | N24 Tanjung Keramat | Shahelmey Yahya (UMNO) | 4,594 | 51.75% | Faezahwaty Abdul Mohamed Ibnu (LDP) | 329 | 3.71% | 10,482 | 1,124 | 76.98% |
| 2020 | N24 Tanjung Keramat | Shahelmey Yahya (UMNO) | 4,594 | 51.75% | Mohd Salleh Lamsin (USNO Baru) | 122 | 1.37% | 10,482 | 1,124 | 76.98% |

Parliament of Malaysia
| Year | Constituency | Candidate | Votes | Pct | Opponent(s) | Votes | Pct | Ballots cast | Majority | Turnout |
|---|---|---|---|---|---|---|---|---|---|---|
| 2022 | P173 Putatan | Shahelmey Yahya (UMNO) | 16,234 | 39.36% | Awang Husaini Sahari (PKR) | 16,110 | 39.06% | 41,249 | 124 | 65.30% |
| 2022 | P173 Putatan | Shahelmey Yahya (UMNO) | 16,234 | 39.36% | Ahmad Mohd Said (WARISAN) | 8,511 | 20.63% | 41,249 | 124 | 65.30% |
| 2022 | P173 Putatan | Shahelmey Yahya (UMNO) | 16,234 | 39.36% | Poyne Tudus @ Patrick Payne (PEJUANG) | 394 | 0.96% | 41,249 | 124 | 65.30% |

== Honours ==
=== Honours of Malaysia ===
- Malaysia
  - Recipient of the 17th Yang di-Pertuan Agong Installation Medal
- Sabah
  - Commander of the Order of Kinabalu (PGDK) – Datuk (2021)
  - Member of the Order of Kinabalu (ADK) (2009)
  - Grand Star of the Order of Kinabalu (BSK) (2005)
  - Justice of the Peace (JP) (2013)
