= Tanjung Aru (state constituency) =

State constituency in Sabah, Malaysia

Tanjung Aru (N22)
Sabah constituency

State constituency
- Legislature: Sabah State Legislative Assembly
MLA
Junz Wong
Heritage
- Constituency created: 1974
- Constituency abolished: 1986
- Constituency re-created: 2004
- First contested: 1974
- Last contested: 2025

Demographics
- Electors (2025): 21,264

Tanjung Aru is a state constituency in Sabah, Malaysia, that is represented in the Sabah State Legislative Assembly.

== Demographics ==
As of 2020, Tanjung Aru has a population of 37,233 people.

Ethnic breakdown of Tanjung Aru's electorate as of 2025
1. Muslim Bumiputera (59.0%)
2. Chinese (21.0%)
3. Non-Muslim Bumiputera (20.0%)
4. Other ethnicities (0.00%)

== History ==
=== Polling districts ===
According to the gazette issued on 31 October 2022, the Tanjung Aru constituency has a total of 7 polling districts.

State constituency	Polling Districts	Code	Location
Tanjung Aru (N22）	Pulau Gaya	173/22/01	SK Pulau Gaya
Tanjung Aru (N22）	Sembulan Utara	173/22/02	SK Sembulan; Dewan Serbaguna Sembulan
Tanjung Aru (N22）	Sembulan Selatan	173/22/03	SMK Sanzac
Tanjung Aru (N22）	Tanjung Aru Timor	173/22/04	SMK Stella Maris
Tanjung Aru (N22）	Tanjung Aru Barat	173/22/05	SMK La Salle Tg Aru
Tanjung Aru (N22）	Lapangan Terbang	173/22/06	SK Tanjung Aru II
Tanjung Aru (N22）	Tanjung Aru Baru	173/22/07	SK Stella Maris

=== Representation history ===
Member of Sabah State Legislative Assembly for Tanjung Aru
Assembly	No	Years	Member	Party
Constituency created
Tanjong Aru
3rd	N10	1967–1971	Lee Vui Min (李威明)	Alliance (SCA)
4th	N10	1971–1976	Herman Luping	Alliance (USNO)
5th	N21	1976	Darius Binion	BERJAYA
5th	N21	1976–1981	Matthew Gonzaga	BERJAYA
6th	N21	1981–1985	Paul Wong Kau Chai Sindin (黄九才)	BN (BERJAYA)
Constituency abolished, split into Petagas and Sembulan
Constituency re-created from Sembulan, Likas and Petagas
12th	N17	2004–2008	Edward Yong Oui Fah (杨爱华)	BN (PBS)
13th	N17	2008–2013	Edward Yong Oui Fah (杨爱华)	BN (PBS)
14th	N17	2013–2018	Edward Yong Oui Fah (杨爱华)	BN (PBS)
15th	N17	2018–2020	Junz Wong (王鸿俊)	WARISAN
Tanjung Aru
16th	N22	2020–2025	Junz Wong (王鸿俊)	WARISAN
17th	N22	2025–present	Junz Wong (王鸿俊)	WARISAN

== Election results ==
Sabah state election, 2025
Party	Candidate	Votes	%	∆%
Heritage	Junz Wong Hong Jun	6,120	47.68	▼9.87
PH	Chan Foong Hin	2,532	19.73	▲19.73
Independent	Ritchie Jay Cheng	1,164	9.07	▲9.07
UPKO	Dennison R Indang	1,046	8.15	▲8.15
PN	Suhaimi Buang	740	5.77	▲5.77
Independent	Mohamed Zaim Ansawi	494	3.85	▲3.85
PBK	Loh Ee Eng	346	2.70	▲2.70
Homeland Solidarity Party	Hiew Choon Yu	249	1.94	▲1.94
Sabah Dream Party	Yee Wee Ping	144	1.12	▲1.12
Total valid votes		12,835		
Total rejected ballots		347		
Unreturned ballots		20		
Turnout		13,202	62.09	▼4.03
Registered electors		21,264		
Majority		3,588	27.95	▼3.91
Heritage hold		Swing		
Source(s) "RESULTS OF CONTESTED ELECTION AND STATEMENTS OF THE POLL AFTER THE OFFICIAL ADDITION OF VOTES" (PDF).

Sabah state election, 2020
Party	Candidate	Votes	%	∆%
Sabah Heritage Party	Junz Wong	5,685	57.55	▲2.75
BN	Mohd Reduan Aklee	2,538	25.69	▼3.32
PBS	Edward Yong Oui Fah	647	6.55	▲6.55
Love Sabah Party	Noran Addy Sukiran	241	2.44	▲2.44
LDP	Ibrahim Okk Mohd Laiman Diki	179	1.81	▲1.81
USNO (Baru)	Shaffic Risaib Shah	88	0.89	▲0.89
GAGASAN	Rizawani Fiona Heng	25	0.25	▲0.25
Independent	Jan Chow Yee Fah	18	0.18	▲0.18
Total valid votes		9,421	95.36	
Total rejected ballots		287	2.91	
Unreturned ballots		171	1.73	
Turnout		9,879	66.12	▼8.88
Registered electors		14,941		
Majority		3,147	31.86	▲6.07
Sabah Heritage Party hold		Swing		
Source(s) "RESULTS OF CONTESTED ELECTION AND STATEMENTS OF THE POLL AFTER THE OFFICIAL ADDITION OF VOTES".

Sabah state election, 2018
Party	Candidate	Votes	%	∆%
Sabah Heritage Party	Junz Wong	9,794	54.80	▲54.80
BN	Edward Yong Oui Fah	5,184	29.01	▼24.35
PAS	Hamid Ismail	1,379	7.72	▼24.00
Sabah People's Hope Party	Noraiza Mohammad Noor	566	3.17	▲3.17
Sabah Native Co-operation Party	Roger Chong Wei Leung	494	2.76	▲2.76
Total valid votes		22,404	97.46	
Total rejected ballots		342	1.91	
Unreturned ballots		112	0.63	
Turnout		17,871	75.00	▼2.60
Registered electors		23,829		
Majority		4,610	25.79	▲4.15
Sabah Heritage Party gain from BN		Swing		?
Source(s) "RESULTS OF CONTESTED ELECTION AND STATEMENTS OF THE POLL AFTER THE OFFICIAL ADDITION OF VOTES".

Sabah state election, 2013
Party	Candidate	Votes	%	∆%
BN	Edward Yong Oui Fah	9,099	53.36	▼1.66
PAS	Hamid Ismail	5,409	31.72	▲31.72
STAR	Yong We Kong	1,333	7.82	▲7.82
SAPP	Salleh Tiasi @ Tiaseh	750	4.40	▲4.40
Total valid votes		16,591	97.30	
Total rejected ballots		448	2.63	
Unreturned ballots		13	0.08	
Turnout		17,052	77.60	▲15.39
Registered electors		21,973		
Majority		3,690	21.64	▼2.16
BN hold		Swing		
Source(s) "KEPUTUSAN PILIHAN RAYA UMUM DEWAN UNDANGAN NEGERI".

Sabah state election, 2008
Party	Candidate	Votes	%	∆%
BN	Edward Yong Oui Fah	6,430	51.70	▼12.61
PKR	Awang Ahmad Sah	3,470	27.90	▲9.32
DAP	Teddy Yang Chan Tsze	2,298	18.48	▲5.07
Total valid votes		12,198	98.08	
Total rejected ballots		225	1.81	
Unreturned ballots		14	0.11	
Turnout		12,437	62.21	▲6.16
Registered electors		19,993		
Majority		2,960	23.80	▼21.93
BN hold		Swing		
Source(s) "KEPUTUSAN PILIHAN RAYA UMUM DEWAN UNDANGAN NEGERI SABAH BAGI TAHUN 2008".

Sabah state election, 2004
Party	Candidate	Votes	%	∆%
BN	Edward Yong Oui Fah	6,904	64.31	
PKR	Awang Ahmad Sah	1,995	18.58	
DAP	Chong Yaw Fah @ Stephen	1,440	13.41	
PAS	Foo Ah Onong @ Onong Otong	118	1.75	
Total valid votes		10,457	97.41	
Total rejected ballots		255	2.38	
Unreturned ballots		23	0.21	
Turnout		10,735	56.05	
Registered electors		19,152		
Majority		4,909	45.73	
BN hold		Swing		
Source(s) "KEPUTUSAN PILIHAN RAYA UMUM DEWAN UNDANGAN NEGERI SABAH BAGI TAHUN 2004".

Sabah state election, 1985: Petagas
Party	Candidate	Votes	%	∆%
PBS	James Andrew Vitales	3,129	52.49	▲52.49
USNO	Quintin Pasus	1,590	26.67	▲26.67
BERJAYA	Clarence Elong Mansul	1,070	17.95	▼44.62
Independent	Wilfred Mojilis	105	1.76	▼0.71
BERSEPADU	Harri Siganul	43	0.72	▲0.72
Independent	John Chong	24	0.40	▼2.07
Total valid votes		5,961	100.00	
Total rejected ballots		73		
Unreturned ballots		0		
Turnout		6,034	74.14	▲3.73
Registered electors		8,139		
Majority		1,539	25.82	▼4.72
PBS gain from BN		Swing		-

Sabah state election, 1981: Tanjong Aru
Party	Candidate	Votes	%	∆%
BERJAYA	Wong Kau Chai Sindin	4,993	62.57	▼4.42
SCCP	Peter Chong On Tet	2,556	32.03	▲32.03
Independent	Aloysius S. Joeman	234	2.93	▲2.93
Independent	Nyrol Ewan	197	2.47	▲2.47
Total valid votes		7,980	100.00	
Total rejected ballots		72		
Unreturned ballots		0		
Turnout		8,052	70.40	▼7.37
Registered electors		11,437		
Majority		2,437	30.54	▼3.45
BN gain from BERJAYA		Swing		-

Sabah state election, 1976: Tanjong Aru
Party	Candidate	Votes	%	∆%
BERJAYA	Darius Banil Binion	3,964	66.99	
USNO	Mohamed Shariff Manjaji	1,953	33.01	
Total valid votes		5,917	100.00	
Total rejected ballots		83		
Unreturned ballots		0		
Turnout		6,000	77.77	
Registered electors		7,715		
Majority		2,011	33.99	
BERJAYA gain from USNO		Swing		-

Sabah state election, 1971: Tanjong Aru
Party	Candidate	Votes	%	∆%
On the nomination day, Herman Luping won uncontested.
USNO	Herman Luping			
Total valid votes				
Total rejected ballots				
Unreturned ballots				
Turnout				
Registered electors		0		
Majority				
USNO gain from SCA		Swing		?

Sabah state election, 1967: Tanjong Aru
Party	Candidate	Votes	%
SCA	Lee Vui Min	3,186	43.08
UPKO	Thomas Jayasuriya	2,272	30.72
Independent	George Chin Kok Min	1,389	18.78
Independent	James Voon Kyam Kuin	496	6.71
Independent	Awid Mail	52	0.70
Total valid votes		7,395	100.00
Total rejected ballots		124	
Unreturned ballots		0	
Turnout		7,519	87.07
Registered electors		8,636	
Majority		914	12.36
This was a new constituency created
