= Mohd Tamin Zainal =

Malaysian politician

Yang Berbahagia Datuk Mohd Tamin Zainal PGDK
- محمد تامين بن زينال

Ministerial roles (Sabah)
- 2020–2023: Assistant Minister of Industrial Development

Faction represented in Sabah State Legislative Assembly
- 2020–2025: Barisan Nasional

Personal details
- Born: Mohd. Tamin bin Zainal; 29 January 1969 (age 57) Papar, Sabah, Malaysia
- Citizenship: Malaysian
- Party: United Malays National Organisation (UMNO)
- Other political affiliations: Barisan Nasional (BN); Perikatan Nasional (PN) (allied); Muafakat Nasional (MN)
- Education: Open University Malaysia
- Occupation: Politician

Mohd. Tamin bin Zainal is a Malaysian politician who is serving as the State Assistant Minister of Industrial Development from 2020 to 2023. He has served as the Member of Sabah State Legislative Assembly (MLA) for Pantai Manis from September 2020 to November 2025. He is a member of the United Malays National Organisation (UMNO) which is aligned with the ruling Perikatan Nasional (PN) coalition both in federal and state levels.

== Election results ==
Sabah State Legislative Assembly
Year	Constituency	Candidate	Votes	Pct	Opponent(s)	Votes	Pct	Ballots cast	Majority	Turnout
2020	N29 Pantai Manis	Mohd Tamin Zainal (UMNO)	5,116	49.56%	Yahiya Ag Kahar (WARISAN)	4,430	42.92%	10,323	686	72.08%
2020	N29 Pantai Manis	Mohd Tamin Zainal (UMNO)	5,116	49.56%	Fauzi Ibrahim (PCS)	499	4.83%	10,323	686	72.08%
2020	N29 Pantai Manis	Mohd Tamin Zainal (UMNO)	5,116	49.56%	Ag Damit Pg Abd Razak (USNO Baru)	151	1.46%	10,323	686	72.08%
2020	N29 Pantai Manis	Mohd Tamin Zainal (UMNO)	5,116	49.56%	Mazreca John (LDP)	127	1.24%	10,323	686	72.08%

== Honours ==
- Sabah
  - Commander of the Order of Kinabalu (PGDK) – Datuk (2025)
  - Companion of the Order of Kinabalu (ASDK) (2023)
  - Star of the Order of Kinabalu (BK) (2015)
