= Petagas =

State constituency in Sabah, Malaysia

Petagas (N23)
Sabah constituency

State constituency
- Legislature: Sabah State Legislative Assembly
MLA
Awang Ahmad Sah
Independent
- Constituency created: 1984
- First contested: 1985
- Last contested: 2025

Demographics
- Population (2020): 35,844
- Electors (2025): 20,116

Petagas is a state constituency in Sabah, Malaysia, that is represented in the Sabah State Legislative Assembly.

== Demographics ==
As of 2020, Petagas has a population of 35,844 people.

Ethnic breakdown of Petagas' electorate as of 2025
1. Muslim Bumiputera (79.0%)
2. Non-Muslim Bumiputera (15.0%)
3. Chinese (6.00%)
4. Other ethnicities (0.00%)

== History ==
=== Polling districts ===
According to the gazette issued on 31 October 2022, the Petagas constituency has a total of 6 polling districts.

State constituency	Polling Districts	Code	Location
Petagas (N23）	Petagas	173/23/01	SK Petagas
Petagas (N23）	Ulu Putatan	173/23/02	SJK (C) Hwa Shiong
Petagas (N23）	Bandar Putatan	173/23/03	SA Negeri Putatan Penampang
Petagas (N23）	Paapason	173/23/04	SMK Tansau
Petagas (N23）	Tengah Padang	173/23/05	SA Negeri Petagas Penampang
Petagas (N23）	Tombovo	173/23/06	Sekolah Pendidikan Khas Sabah, Putatan

=== Representation history ===
Member of Sabah State Legislative Assembly for Petagas
Assembly	No	Years	Member	Party
Constituency created from Tanjong Aru
7th	N31	1985–1986	James Andrew Vitales	PBS
8th	N31	1986–1990	James Andrew Vitales	PBS
9th	N31	1990–1994	James Ligunjang	GR (PBS)
10th	N31	1994–1999	Yahya Hussin	BN (UMNO)
11th	N17	1999–2004	Yahya Hussin	BN (UMNO)
12th	N18	2004–2008	Yahya Hussin	BN (UMNO)
13th	N18	2008–2013	Yahya Hussin	BN (UMNO)
14th	N18	2013–2018	Yahya Hussin	BN (UMNO)
15th	N18	2018–2020	Uda Sulai	WARISAN
16th	N23	2020–2023	Awang Ahmad Sah	WARISAN
16th	N23	2023–2025	Awang Ahmad Sah	GRS (GAGASAN)
17th	N23	2025–present	Awang Ahmad Sah	Independent

== Election results ==
Sabah state election, 2025: Petagas
Party	Candidate	Votes	%	∆%
Independent	Awang Ahmad Sah	4,271	31.89	▲31.89
PH	Awang Husaini Sahari	3,016	22.52	▲22.52
Heritage	Uda Sulai	2,912	21.74	▼21.49
UPKO	Jason Lee Nyuk Soon	1,306	9.75	▲9.75
PN	Mohd Afifi Shaiffuddin	1,283	9.58	▼30.91
Homeland Solidarity Party	Annita Shiela F. Among	276	2.06	▲2.06
Sabah Dream Party	Aslin Samat	133	0.99	▲0.99
KDM	Adelaide Cornelius	122	0.91	▲0.91
Sabah Native Co-operation Party	Sabrezani Sabdin	40	0.30	▲0.30
Independent	Patrick Manius	34	0.25	▲0.25
Total valid votes		13,393		
Total rejected ballots		201		
Unreturned ballots		34		
Turnout		13,628	67.75	▼1.58
Registered electors		20,116		
Majority		1,255	5.46	▲2.72
Independent gain from Heritage		Swing		?
Source(s) "RESULTS OF CONTESTED ELECTION AND STATEMENTS OF THE POLL AFTER THE OFFICIAL ADDITION OF VOTES" (PDF).

Sabah state election, 2020: Petagas
Party	Candidate	Votes	%	∆%
Sabah Heritage Party	Awang Ahmad Sah	4,125	43.23	▼3.31
PN	Arsit Sedi @ Sidik	3,864	40.49	▲40.49
Independent	Paul Nointien	572	5.99	▲5.99
Love Sabah Party	Ahmad Farid Sainuri	355	3.72	▲3.72
LDP	Jecky Lettong @ Thaddeus Jack	118	1.24	▲1.24
GAGASAN	Mohamad Kulat	33	0.35	▲0.35
Total valid votes		9,067	95.02	
Total rejected ballots		210	2.20	
Unreturned ballots		265	2.78	
Turnout		9,542	69.33	▼15.60
Registered electors		13,763		
Majority		261	2.74	▲1.26
Sabah Heritage Party hold		Swing		
Source(s) "RESULTS OF CONTESTED ELECTION AND STATEMENTS OF THE POLL AFTER THE OFFICIAL ADDITION OF VOTES".

Sabah state election, 2018: Petagas
Party	Candidate	Votes	%	∆%
Sabah Heritage Party	Uda Sulai	6,526	46.54	▲46.54
BN	Yahya Hussin	6,318	45.06	▼20.94
Sabah People's Hope Party	Ester Otion Matanul	760	5.42	▲5.42
Total valid votes		13,604	97.03	
Total rejected ballots		294	2.10	
Unreturned ballots		123	0.88	
Turnout		14,021	84.93	▲1.93
Registered electors		17,483		
Majority		208	1.48	▼42.39
Sabah Heritage Party gain from BN		Swing		?
Source(s) "RESULTS OF CONTESTED ELECTION AND STATEMENTS OF THE POLL AFTER THE OFFICIAL ADDITION OF VOTES".

Sabah state election, 2013: Petagas
Party	Candidate	Votes	%	∆%
BN	Yahya Hussin	8,504	66.00	▲4.30
PKR	Mat Yunin @ Mohd Yunin Atin	2,851	22.13	▼6.71
STAR	Awang Ahmad Sah	1,111	8.62	▲8.62
Total valid votes		12,466	96.76	
Total rejected ballots		267	2.07	
Unreturned ballots		151	1.17	
Turnout		12,884	83.00	▲10.33
Registered electors		15,517		
Majority		5,653	43.87	▲11.01
BN hold		Swing		
Source(s) "KEPUTUSAN PILIHAN RAYA UMUM DEWAN UNDANGAN NEGERI". Archived from the original on 2022-06-29.

Sabah state election, 2008: Petagas
Party	Candidate	Votes	%	∆%
BN	Yahya Hussin	6,700	61.70	▼4.57
PKR	Salleh Tiasi @ Tiaseh	3,132	28.84	▲28.84
Total valid votes		9,832	90.54	
Total rejected ballots		332	3.06	
Unreturned ballots		695	6.40	
Turnout		10,859	72.67	▲4.05
Registered electors		14,942		
Majority		3,568	32.86	▼8.23
BN hold		Swing		
Source(s) "KEPUTUSAN PILIHAN RAYA UMUM DEWAN UNDANGAN NEGERI SABAH BAGI TAHUN 2008".

Sabah state election, 2004: Petagas
Party	Candidate	Votes	%	∆%
BN	Yahya Hussin	6,808	66.27	▲9.43
BERSEKUTU	Salleh Tiasi @ Tiaseh	2,587	25.18	▲19.27
Total valid votes		9,395	91.45	
Total rejected ballots		179	1.74	
Unreturned ballots		699	6.80	
Turnout		10,273	68.62	▼1.55
Registered electors		14,971		
Majority		4,221	41.09	▲17.78
BN hold		Swing		
Source(s) "KEPUTUSAN PILIHAN RAYA UMUM DEWAN UNDANGAN NEGERI SABAH BAGI TAHUN 2004".

Sabah state election, 1999: Petagas
Party	Candidate	Votes	%	∆%
BN	Yahya Hussin	9,234	56.84	▲5.72
PBS	Uda Sulai	5,447	33.53	▼9.49
BERSEKUTU	Mohd Dini Mohd Khan	960	5.91	▲5.91
SETIA	Musa Abdul Rahman	122	0.75	▲0.75
Total valid votes		15,763	97.03	
Total rejected ballots		483	2.97	
Unreturned ballots		0	0.00	
Turnout		16,246	70.17	▼2.06
Registered electors		23,152		
Majority		3,787	23.31	▲15.21
BN hold		Swing		
Source(s) "KEPUTUSAN PILIHAN RAYA UMUM DEWAN UNDANGAN NEGERI SABAH BAGI TAHUN 1999".

Sabah state election, 1994: Petagas
Party	Candidate	Votes	%	∆%
BN	Yahya Hussin	7,513	51.12	▲51.12
PBS	James Ligunjang	6,323	43.02	▼14.00
Independent	James Andrew Vitales	564	3.84	▲3.84
Total valid votes		14,400	97.97	
Total rejected ballots		298	2.03	
Unreturned ballots		0	0.00	
Turnout		14,698	72.23	▼1.65
Registered electors		20,350		
Majority		1,190	8.10	▼16.71
BN gain from PBS		Swing		?
Source(s) "KEPUTUSAN PILIHAN RAYA UMUM DEWAN UNDANGAN NEGERI SABAH BAGI TAHUN 1994".

Sabah state election, 1990: Petagas
Party	Candidate	Votes	%	∆%
PBS	James Ligunjang	6,108	57.02	▼8.09
USNO	Yahya Hussin	3,450	32.21	▲32.21
BERJAYA	Abdul Wahab Patail	472	4.41	▼6.70
Independent	Arif Zaman	282	2.63	▲2.63
LDP	Thomas Fung Chik Tong	220	2.05	▲2.05
Sabah People's Party	Albert Tokuzip	105	0.98	▲0.98
AKAR	Ooi Kong Eow	25	0.23	▲0.23
Total valid votes		10,662	99.53	
Total rejected ballots		50	0.47	
Unreturned ballots		236	0.00	
Turnout		10,948	75.5	▼0.75
Registered electors		14,500		
Majority		2,658	24.81	▼18.18
PBS hold		Swing		
Source(s) "KEPUTUSAN PILIHAN RAYA UMUM DEWAN UNDANGAN NEGERI SABAH BAGI TAHUN 1990". "1990 SABAH STATE ELECTIONS".

Sabah state election, 1986: Petagas
Party	Candidate	Votes	%	∆%
PBS	James Andrew Vitales	4,935	65.11	
Sabah Chinese Party	Thomas Fung Chik Tong	1,677	22.12	
BERJAYA	Clarence Elong Mansul	866	11.42	
SCCP	Peter Ho See Ming	64	0.84	
Total valid votes		7,542	99.50	
Total rejected ballots		38	0.50	
Unreturned ballots		0	0.00	
Turnout		7,580	74.75	
Registered electors		10,140		
Majority		3,258	42.99	
PBS hold		Swing		
Source(s) "KEPUTUSAN PILIHAN RAYA UMUM DEWAN UNDANGAN NEGERI SABAH BAGI TAHUN 1986". "1986 Sabah DUN Results".

Sabah state election, 1985: Petagas
Party	Candidate	Votes	%
PBS	James Andrew Vitales	3,129	52.49
USNO	Quintin Pasus	1,590	26.67
BERJAYA	Clarence Elong Mansul	1,070	17.95
Independent	Wilfred Mojilis	105	1.76
BERSEPADU	Hairiri Siganul	43	0.72
Independent	John Chong	24	0.40
Total valid votes		5,961	98.79
Total rejected ballots		73	1.21
Unreturned ballots		0	0.00
Turnout		6,034	74.14
Registered electors		8,139	
Majority		1,539	25.51
This was a new constituency created.
Source(s) "1985 Sabah DUN Results".
