= Sabah Native Cooperation Party =

Malaysian political party

Sabah Native Cooperation Party Parti Kerjasama Anak Negeri 沙巴子民合作党
- Abbreviation: ANAK NEGERI
- President: Henrynus Amin
- Secretary-General: Trevor K Maringking
- Founder: Zainal Hj. Nasirudin
- Founded: November 2013
- Preceded by: Sabah People's Cooperation Party / Parti Kerjasama Rakyat Sabah (PAKAR)
- Headquarters: Kota Kinabalu, Sabah
- Youth wing: Arthur Erik (Acting)
- Women's wing: Priskila Awkila
- Ideology: Sabah regionalism
- National affiliation: PCS-Anak Negeri Alliance (2018-2019)
- Colours: White, Black, Red, Blue and Yellow
- Dewan Negara: 0 / 70
- Dewan Rakyat: 0 / 26 (Sabah and Labuan seats)
- Sabah State Legislative Assembly: 0 / 79

Party flag

Website
- https://www.partianaknegeri.org/

The Sabah Native Cooperation Party (Malay: Parti Kerjasama Anak Negeri, abbreviated ANAK NEGERI) is a political party in Malaysia based in Sabah.

The party former name is Sabah People's Cooperation Party or Malay: Parti Kerjasama Rakyat Sabah (PAKAR) and prior to its establishment the party intended to contest in the Malaysian general election, 2013 2013 Malaysian general election but its registration was not approved until November 2013.

Following its recognition by the Registry of Societies (RoS) in 2017, the party contested in the Malaysian general election, 2018/ 2018 Malaysian general election.

The party also signed a political pact with the Love Sabah Party (PCS) with the ultimate goal to restore the rights, dignity and identity of the ‘Anak Negeri’ (native) or the firstborn in the state of Sabah. In June of 2025, Trevor Maringking was appointed as Secretary-General for the party. Also appointed in June of 2025, Priskila Akwila as the party's new Women’s Chief, Nazarul K Wahab as the party's new Youth Chief and Datin Seri Ruzi Saul as a Supreme Council member.

== General election results ==
Election	Total seats won	Seats contested	Total votes	Voting Percentage	Outcome of election	Election leader
2018	0 / 222	9	1,173	0.01%	0 seat; No representation in Parliament	Zainal Nasirudin

== State election results ==
Sabah State Legislative Assembly
Election	Votes		Seats			Position	Status
Election	Count	%	Result	Won / contested	+/–	Position	Status
2018	3,059	0.4	0 / 60	0 / 9	Steady	7th	No seats
2020	604	0.1	0 / 73	0 / 2	Steady	▼9th	No seats
2025	1,542	0.1	0 / 73	0 / 17	Steady	▼11th	No seats

== See also ==
- Politics of Malaysia
- List of political parties in Malaysia
