= Kalabakan (federal constituency) =

Federal constituency of Sabah, Malaysia

Kalabakan (P191)
Sabah constituency

Federal constituency
- Legislature: Dewan Rakyat
- MP: Andi Muhammad Suryandy Bandy; BN
- Constituency created: 2003
- First contested: 2004
- Last contested: 2022

Demographics
- Population (2020): 188,656
- Electors (2025): 89,725
- Area (km²): 4,551
- Pop. density (per km²): 41.5

Kalabakan is a federal constituency in Tawau Division (Kalabakan District and Tawau District), Sabah, Malaysia, that has been represented in the Dewan Rakyat since 2004.

The federal constituency was created in the 2003 redistribution and is mandated to return a single member to the Dewan Rakyat under the first past the post voting system.

== Demographics ==
https://ge15.orientaldaily.com.my/seats/sabah/p

Ethnic breakdown of Kalabakan's electorate as of 2022
1. Malay-Muslim Bumiputera (58.8%)
2. Sabah Bumiputera (18.3%)
3. Other ethnicities (14.0%)
4. Chinese (8.80%)

As of 2020, Kalabakan has a population of 188,656 people.

Age breakdown of Kalabakan's electorate as of 2022
1. 18-20 (7.69%)
2. 21-29 (27.0%)
3. 30-39 (26.3%)
4. 40-49 (15.5%)
5. 50-59 (10.6%)
6. 60-69 (8.53%)
7. 70-79 (2.81%)
8. 80-89 (0.99%)
9. above 90 (0.60%)
Gender breakdown of Kalabakan's electorate as of 2022
1. Male (51.3%)
2. Female (48.7%)

== History ==
=== Polling districts ===
According to the gazette issued on 321 November 2025, the Kalabakan constituency has a total of 19 polling districts.

State constituency	Polling District	Code	Location
Kukusan (N70)	Muhibbah Raya	191/70/01	SK Muhibbah Raya
Kukusan (N70)	Sentosa	191/70/02	SJK (C) Yuk Chin
Kukusan (N70)	Kukusan	191/70/03	SMK Kuhara
Kukusan (N70)	Padang Terbang	191/70/04	SK Bandar Tawau; SK Bandar Tawau II
Kukusan (N70)	Banyan	191/70/05	SA Islamiah Tawau
Tanjung Batu (N71)	Pasir Putih	191/71/01	SMK Pasir Putih
Tanjung Batu (N71)	Tanjung Batu	191/71/02	SK Tanjong Batu; Dewan Kompleks Sukan Tawau
Tanjung Batu (N71)	Keramat	191/71/03	SK Tg Batu Keramat; SJK (C) Kuok Ming
Merotai (N72)	Brumas	191/72/01	SK Brumas
Merotai (N72)	Kijang	191/72/02	SK Merotai Besar
Merotai (N72)	Bombalai	191/72/03	SMK Abaka; SK Bombalai; SK Sungai Haji Matahir
Merotai (N72)	Air Panas	191/72/04	SK St Patrick
Merotai (N72)	Semarak	191/72/05	Kolej Vokesional Tawau
Merotai (N72)	Merotai	191/72/06	SMK Merotai Besar; SK Merotai Kecil
Sebatik (N73)	Luasong	191/73/01	SK Luasong
Sebatik (N73)	Kalabakan	191/73/02	SK Kalabakan; SMK Kalabakan
Sebatik (N73)	Umas-Umas	191/73/03	SK Umas-Umas; SMK Umas-Umas
Sebatik (N73)	Sarudung Laut	191/73/04	Balai Raya Sarudung Laut
Sebatik (N73)	Sebatik	191/73/05	SK Wallace Bay
Sebatik (N73)	Tamang	191/73/06	SK Mentadak Baru
Sebatik (N73)	Bergosong	191/73/07	SK Bergosong

=== Representation history ===
Members of Parliament for Kalabakan
Parliament	No	Years	Member	Party	Vote Share
Constituency created from Tawau
11th	P191	2004-2008	Abdul Ghapur Salleh (عبدالغڤور صالح)	BN (UMNO)	Uncontested
12th	P191	2008-2013	Abdul Ghapur Salleh (عبدالغڤور صالح)	BN (UMNO)	Uncontested
13th	P191	2013-2018	Abdul Ghapur Salleh (عبدالغڤور صالح)	BN (UMNO)	23,125; 65.87%
14th	P191	2018–2022	Ma'mun Sulaiman (مأمون سليمان)	WARISAN	18,486; 50.09%
15th	P191	2022–present	Andi Muhammad Suryandy Bandy (أندي محمد سوريادي بن بندي)	BN (UMNO)	23,855; 47.68%

=== State constituency ===
Parliamentary constituency	State constituency					
Parliamentary constituency	1967–1974	1974–1985	1985–1995	1995–2004	2004–2020	2020–present
Kalabakan						Kukusan
Kalabakan					Merotai	
Kalabakan					Sebatik	
Kalabakan					Tanjong Batu	
Kalabakan						Tanjung Batu

=== Historical boundaries ===
State Cosntituency	Area	
State Cosntituency	2003	2019
Kukusan		Kampung Airport Lama; Kampung Jawa Lanut; Kampung Sentosa; Kuhara; Taman Guan Soon
Merotai	Bombalai; Kampung Pasir Puteh; Merotai; Taman Semarak Indah; Taman Sun Shu	Bombalai; Kampung Indah; Merotai; Taman Semarak Indah; Taman Sun Shu
Sebatik	Kampung Poirgon; Kampung Sungai Pendak; Mentadak; Sebatik; Serudong	FELDA Umas; Kalabakan; Kampung Poirgon; Sebatik; Serudong
Tanjung Batu	FELDA Umas; Kalabakan; Luasong; Tanjung Batu; Tanjung Keramat	Jalan Imam Galundang; Kampung Bukit Gemuk; Kampung Pasir Putih; Tanjung Batu; Tanjung Keramat

=== Current state assembly members ===
No.	State Constituency	Member	Coalition (Party)
N70	Kukusan	Rina Jainal	IND
N71	Tanjong Batu	Andi Muhammad Shamsureezal	GRS (GAGASAN)
N72	Merotai	Sarifuddin Hata	WARISAN
N73	Sebatik	Manahing Tinggilani	WARISAN

=== Local governments and postcodes ===
No.	State Constituency	Local Government	Postcode
N70	Kukusan	Tawau Municipal Council	91000 Tawau
N71	Tanjong Batu	Tawau Municipal Council	91000 Tawau
N72	Merotai	Tawau Municipal Council	91000 Tawau
N73	Sebatik	Tawau Municipal Council	91000 Tawau

== Election results ==
Malaysian general election, 2022
Party	Candidate	Votes	%	∆%
BN	Andi Muhammad Suryady Bandy	23,855	47.68	▲6.23
Heritage	Ma'mun Sulaiman	14,755	29.49	▼20.60
PH	Noraini Abd Ghapur	9,398	18.78	▲18.78
PEJUANG	Nur Aini Abdul Rahman	1,681	3.36	▲3.36
Independent	Muhamad Dhiauddin Hassan	341	0.68	▲0.68
Total valid votes		50,030	100.00	
Total rejected ballots		515		
Unreturned ballots		246		
Turnout		50,791	60.48	▼13.30
Registered electors		83,970		
Majority		9,100	18.19	▲9.56
BN gain from Heritage		Swing		?
Source(s) https://lom.agc.gov.my/ilims/upload/portal/akta/outputp/1753262/PUB619_2022.pdf

Malaysian general election, 2018
Party	Candidate	Votes	%	∆%
Sabah Heritage Party	Ma'mun Sulaiman	18,486	50.09	▲50.09
BN	Abdul Ghapur Salleh	15,299	41.45	▼24.42
PAS	Norbin Aloh	2,813	7.62	▼17.74
Sabah People's Unity Party	Ahmad Lahama	311	0.84	▲0.84
Total valid votes		36,909	100.00	
Total rejected ballots		840		
Unreturned ballots		292		
Turnout		38,041	72.88	▼4.55
Registered electors		52,199		
Majority		3,187	8.63	▼31.88
Sabah Heritage Party gain from BN		Swing		?
Source(s) "His Majesty's Government Gazette - Notice of Contested Election, Parliament for the State of Sabah [P.U. (B) 246/2018]" (PDF). Attorney General's Chambers of Malaysia. 3 May 2018. "Federal Government Gazette - Results of Contested Election and Statements of the Poll after the Official Addition of Votes, Parliamentary Constituencies for the State of Sabah [P.U. (B) 320/2018]" (PDF). Attorney General's Chambers of Malaysia. 28 May 2018. Archived from the original (PDF) on 2019-12-29.

Malaysian general election, 2013
Party	Candidate	Votes	%	∆%
BN	Abdul Ghapur Salleh	23,125	65.87	
PAS	Usman Madeaming	8,904	25.36	
Independent	Mohd Manuke	1,313	3.74	
Independent	Siamsir Borhan	891	2.54	
STAR	Malvine Reyes	603	1.72	
Independent	Freddie Japat Simol	137	0.39	
Independent	Yahya Zainal	132	0.38	
Total valid votes		35,105	100.00	
Total rejected ballots		1,027		
Unreturned ballots		98		
Turnout		36,230	77.43	
Registered electors		46,793		
Majority		14,221	40.51	
BN hold		Swing		
Source(s) "Federal Government Gazette - Notice of Contested Election, Parliament for the State of Sabah [P.U. (B) 183/2013]" (PDF). Attorney General's Chambers of Malaysia. 26 April 2013. Archived from the original (PDF) on 2018-09-30. "Federal Government Gazette - Results of Contested Election and Statements of the Poll after the Official Addition of Votes, Parliamentary Constituencies for the State of Sabah [P.U. (B) 224/2013]" (PDF). Attorney General's Chambers of Malaysia. 22 May 2013. Archived from the original (PDF) on 2018-09-30.

Malaysian general election, 2008
Party	Candidate	Votes	%	∆%
On the nomination day, Abdul Ghapur Salleh won uncontested.
BN	Abdul Ghapur Salleh			
Total valid votes			100.00	
Total rejected ballots				
Unreturned ballots				
Turnout				
Registered electors				
Majority				
BN hold		Swing		

Malaysian general election, 2004
Party	Candidate	Votes	%
On the nomination day, Abdul Ghapur Salleh won uncontested.
BN	Abdul Ghapur Salleh		
Total valid votes			100.00
Total rejected ballots			
Unreturned ballots			
Turnout			
Registered electors			
Majority			
This was a new constituency created.
