= Tanjong Batu =

Tanjong Batu may refer to:

- Tanjong Batu (Sabah state constituency), represented in the Sabah State Legislative Assembly
- Tanjong Batu (Sarawak state constituency), represented in the Sarawak State Legislative Assembly

== See also ==
- Tanjong Datu
