= Kukusan =

State constituency in Sabah, Malaysia

Kukusan (N70)
Sabah constituency

State constituency
- Legislature: Sabah State Legislative Assembly
MLA
Rina Jainal
Independent
- Constituency created: 2019
- First contested: 2020
- Last contested: 2025

Demographics
- Population (2020): 29,893
- Electors (2025): 19,225

Kukusan is a state constituency in Sabah, Malaysia, that is represented in the Sabah State Legislative Assembly. This is one of the thirteen new state constituencies as result of approval from state legislative and Dewan Rakyat on 17 July 2019 and presenting for the first time for snap election

== Demographics ==
As of 2020, Kukusan has a population of 29,893 people.

Ethnic breakdown of Kukusan's electorate as of 2025
1. Muslim Bumiputera (82.0%)
2. Chinese (11.0%)
3. Non-Muslim Bumiputera (6.00%)
4. Other ethnicities (1.00%)

== History ==
=== Polling districts ===
According to the gazette issued on 31 October 2022, the Kukusan constituency has a total of 5 polling districts.

State constituency	Polling District	Code	Location
Kukusan (N70)	Muhibbah Raya	191/70/01	SK Muhibbah Raya; SK Bahagia
Kukusan (N70)	Sentosa	191/70/02	SJK (C) Yuk Chin
Kukusan (N70)	Kukusan	191/70/03	SMK Kuhara
Kukusan (N70)	Padang Terbang	191/70/04	SK Bandar Tawau; SK Bandar Tawau II
Kukusan (N70)	Banyan	191/70/05	SA Islamiah Tawau

=== Representation history ===
Members of the Legislative Assembly for Kukusan
Assembly	No	Years	Member	Party
Constituency created from Tanjong Batu, Merotai and Sri Tanjong
16th	N70	2020–2022	Rina Jainal	WARISAN
16th	N70	2022–2023	Rina Jainal	PHRS
16th	N70	2023–2025	Rina Jainal	GRS (PHRS)
17th	N70	2025–present	Rina Jainal	Independent

== Election results ==
Sabah state election, 2025: Kukusan
Party	Candidate	Votes	%	∆%
Independent	Rina Jainal	3,490	31.56	▲31.56
Heritage	Ma'mun Sulaiman	2,840	25.68	▼15.86
GRS	Samsiah Usman	2,063	18.65	▲18.65
BN	Chaya Sulaiman	1,588	14.36	▼27.04
PN	Francis @ Lawrance Yusop	725	6.56	▲6.56
Homeland Solidarity Party	Rahman Yahya	125	1.13	▲1.13
Independent	Hairul Amin @ Kenon	119	1.08	▲1.08
Sabah Dream Party	Razik Muyong	45	0.41	▲0.41
Sabah People's Unity Party	Ishak Ismail	39	0.35	▲0.35
Sabah Native Co-operation Party	Mariani Sulaiman	25	0.23	▲0.23
Total valid votes		11,059		
Total rejected ballots		148		
Unreturned ballots		76		
Turnout		11,283	58.69	▲4.72
Registered electors		19,225		
Majority		650	5.88	▲5.74
Independent gain from Heritage		Swing		?
Source(s) "RESULTS OF CONTESTED ELECTION AND STATEMENTS OF THE POLL AFTER THE OFFICIAL ADDITION OF VOTES" (PDF).

Sabah state election, 2020: Kukusan
Party	Candidate	Votes	%
Sabah Heritage Party	Rina Jainal	2,834	41.54
BN	Chaya Sulaiman	2,824	41.40
Sabah People's Hope Party	Wong Jin Soon	796	11.67
USNO (Baru)	Ismail Idris	80	1.17
Love Sabah Party	Taufik Muin	75	1.10
Sabah People's Unity Party	Rosdina Mohd Noor	34	0.50
GAGASAN	Lee Boon King	21	0.31
Total valid votes		6,667	97.73
Total rejected ballots		102	1.50
Unreturned ballots		56	0.82
Turnout		6,822	53.97
Registered electors		12,640	
Majority		10	0.14
This was a new constituency created.
Source(s) "RESULTS OF CONTESTED ELECTION AND STATEMENTS OF THE POLL AFTER THE OFFICIAL ADDITION OF VOTES".
