= Andi Rizal =

Malaysian politician and physician

Yang Berhormat Dr. Andi Rizal MLA
- أندي ريزال

State Assistant Minister of Tourism, Culture and Environment of Sabah
- Incumbent
- Assumed office 2 Disember 2025
- Governor: Musa Aman
- Chief Minister: Hajiji Noor
- Minister: Jafry Ariffin
- Preceded by: Joniston Bangkuai
- Constituency: Tanjung Batu

Member of the Sabah State Legislative Assembly for Tanjung Batu
- Incumbent
- Assumed office 29 November 2025
- Preceded by: Andi Suryady (BN–UMNO)
- Majority: 981 (2025)

Personal details
- Born: Andi Md Shamsureezal bin Mohd Sainal; 1986 (age 39–40)
- Citizenship: Malaysia
- Party: Parti Gagasan Rakyat Sabah (GAGASAN)
- Other political affiliations: Gabungan Rakyat Sabah
- Spouse: Suseela Ismail
- Children: 2
- Education: Kursk State Medical University (MD); University of the Philippines (MHA)
- Occupation: Politician
- Profession: Physician

Andi Md Shamsureezal bin Mohd Sainal, commonly known as Dr. Andi Rizal is a Malaysian politician and physician who has served as State Assistant Minister of Tourism, Culture and Environment of Sabah in the Gabungan Rakyat Sabah (GRS) state administration under Chief Minister Hajiji Noor and Minister Jafry Ariffin since December 2025 and Member of the Sabah State Legislative Assembly (MLA) for Tanjung Batu since November 2025.

== Career ==
He was the Director of Lahad Datu Hospital, Sabah before he contested in the 2025 Sabah state election.

== Election results ==
Sabah State Legislative Assembly
| Year | Constituency | Candidate | Votes | Pct | Opponent(s) | Votes | Pct | Ballots cast | Majority | Turnout |
|---|---|---|---|---|---|---|---|---|---|---|
| 2025 | N71 Tanjung Batu | Andi Rizal (GAGASAN) | 5,492 | 34.77% | Samasuddin Yusop (Sabah UMNO) | 4,511 | 28.56% | 15,990 | 981 | 58.49% |
| 2025 | N71 Tanjung Batu | Andi Rizal (GAGASAN) | 5,492 | 34.77% | Ayuf Abd Rahman (WARISAN) | 3,228 | 20.44% | 15,990 | 981 | 58.49% |
| 2025 | N71 Tanjung Batu | Andi Rizal (GAGASAN) | 5,492 | 34.77% | Ahmad Dullah (PAS) | 2,426 | 15.36% | 15,990 | 981 | 58.49% |
| 2025 | N71 Tanjung Batu | Andi Rizal (GAGASAN) | 5,492 | 34.77% | Zanudin Mingo (IMPIAN) | 139 | 0.88% | 15,990 | 981 | 58.49% |
