= Andi Suryady =

Malaysian politician (born 1981)

Yang Berbahagia Datuk Andi Suryady PGDK ASDK BSK MP
- أندي محمد سوريادي بن بندي

State Assistant Minister of Industrial Development and Entrepreneurship of Sabah
- In office 1 February 2023 – 29 November 2025
- Minister: Phoong Jin Zhe
- Governor: Juhar Mahiruddin
- Chief Minister: Hajiji Noor
- Preceded by: Position established
- Succeeded by: Jonnybone J Kurum (State Assistant Minister of Industry, Entrepreneurship and Transport)
- Constituency: Tanjung Batu

State Assistant Minister of Industrial Development of Sabah
- In office 26 January 2023 – 1 February 2023
- Minister: Phoong Jin Zhe
- Governor: Juhar Mahiruddin
- Chief Minister: Hajiji Noor
- Preceded by: Joachim Gunsalam
- Succeeded by: Position abolished
- Constituency: Tanjung Batu

State Assistant Minister of Youth and Sports of Sabah
- In office 8 October 2020 – 26 January 2023
- Minister: Ellron Alfred Angin
- Governor: Juhar Mahiruddin
- Chief Minister: Hajiji Noor
- Preceded by: Arunarnsin Taib
- Succeeded by: Fairuz Renddan
- Constituency: Tanjung Batu

Member of the Malaysian Parliament for Kalabakan
- Incumbent
- Assumed office 19 November 2022
- Preceded by: Ma'mun Sulaiman (WARISAN)
- Majority: 9,100 (2022)

Member of the Sabah State Legislative Assembly for Tanjung Batu
- In office 26 September 2020 – 29 November 2025
- Preceded by: Hamisa Samat (BN–UMNO)
- Succeeded by: Andi Md Shamsureezal (GRS–GAGASAN)
- Majority: 2,123 (2020)

Faction represented in Dewan Rakyat
- 2022–: Barisan Nasional

Faction represented in Sabah State Legislative Assembly
- 2020–2025: Barisan Nasional

Personal details
- Born: Andi Muhammad Suryady bin Bandy; 29 June 1981 (age 45) Kalabakan, Tawau, Sabah, Malaysia
- Citizenship: Malaysian
- Party: United Malays National Organisation (UMNO) (membership suspended : 2023–2029)
- Other political affiliations: Barisan Nasional (BN); Gabungan Rakyat Sabah (GRS)
- Spouse: Annie Foo
- Education: Universiti Malaysia Sabah; University of Technology, Malaysia
- Occupation: Politician

Andi Muhammad Suryady bin Bandy (born 29 June 1981) is a Malaysian politician who has served as the State Assistant Minister of Industrial Development and Entrepreneurship of Sabah in the Gabungan Rakyat Sabah (GRS) state administration under Chief Minister Hajiji Noor and Minister Phoong Jin Zhe since February 2023, the Member of Parliament (MP) for Kalabakan since November 2022 as well as Member of the Sabah State Legislative Assembly (MLA) for Tanjung Batu since September 2020. He also served as the State Assistant Minister of Industrial Development of Sabah and State Assistant Minister of Youth and Sports of Sabah in the GRS state administration under Chief Minister Hajiji and Ministers Ellron Alfred Angin and Phoong from October 2020 to February 2023. He is a member of the United Malays National Organisation (UMNO), a component party of the Barisan Nasional (BN) coalition.

== Election results ==
Sabah State Legislative Assembly
Year	Constituency	Candidate	Votes	Pct	Opponent(s)	Votes	Pct	Ballots cast	Majority	Turnout
2020	N71 Tanjung Batu	Andi Muhammad Suryady Bandy (UMNO)	4,728	62.08%	Mohd Afsar Abd Latif (WARISAN)	2,605	34.20%	7,616	2,123	51.20%
2020	N71 Tanjung Batu	Andi Muhammad Suryady Bandy (UMNO)	4,728	62.08%	Rudy Nurdin (PCS)	130	1.71%	7,616	2,123	51.20%
2020	N71 Tanjung Batu	Andi Muhammad Suryady Bandy (UMNO)	4,728	62.08%	Kamshari Ibrahim (PPRS)	79	1.04%	7,616	2,123	51.20%
2020	N71 Tanjung Batu	Andi Muhammad Suryady Bandy (UMNO)	4,728	62.08%	Zulkifli Ahmad (USNO Baru)	58	0.76%	7,616	2,123	51.20%
2020	N71 Tanjung Batu	Andi Muhammad Suryady Bandy (UMNO)	4,728	62.08%	Asmari Udoh (IND)	16	0.21%	7,616	2,123	51.20%

Parliament of Malaysia
Year	Constituency	Candidate	Votes	Pct	Opponent(s)	Votes	Pct	Ballots cast	Majority	Turnout
2022	P191 Kalabakan	Andi Muhammad Suryady Bandy (UMNO)	23,855	47.68%	Ma'mun Sulaiman (WARISAN)	14,755	24.49%	60,791	9,100	59.58%
2022	P191 Kalabakan	Andi Muhammad Suryady Bandy (UMNO)	23,855	47.68%	Noraini Abd Ghapur (PKR)	9,398	18.78%	60,791	9,100	59.58%
2022	P191 Kalabakan	Andi Muhammad Suryady Bandy (UMNO)	23,855	47.68%	Nur Aini Abdul Rahman (PEJUANG)	1,681	3.36%	60,791	9,100	59.58%
2022	P191 Kalabakan	Andi Muhammad Suryady Bandy (UMNO)	23,855	47.68%	Muhamad Dhiauddin Hassan (IND)	341	0.68%	60,791	9,100	59.58%

== Honours ==
=== Honours of Malaysia ===
- Malaysia
  - Recipient of the 17th Yang di-Pertuan Agong Installation Medal
- Sabah
  - Commander of the Order of Kinabalu (PGDK) – Datuk (2022)
  - Companion of the Order of Kinabalu (ASDK) (2021)
  - Grand Star of the Order of Kinabalu (BSK) (2016)
