= Johnny Pang Leong Ming =

Malaysian politician

Yang Berhormat Johnny Pang Leong Ming MLA
- 潘隆铭

Member of the Sarawak State Legislative Assembly for Tanjong Batu
- Incumbent
- Assumed office 2021
- Preceded by: Chiew Chiu Sing

Personal details
- Born: Johnny Pang Leong Ming; 1960 (age 65–66) Sarawak
- Citizenship: Malaysian
- Party: SUPP
- Other political affiliations: Gabungan Parti Sarawak
- Occupation: Politician

Johnny Pang Leong Ming is a Malaysian politician from SUPP. He has served as the Member of the Sarawak State Legislative Assembly for Tanjong Batu since 2021.

== Election results ==
Sarawak State Legislative Assembly
Year	Constituency	Candidate	Votes	Pct.	Opponent(s)	Votes	Pct.	Ballots cast	Majority	Turnout
2021	N68 Tanjong Batu	Johnny Pang Leong Ming (SUPP)	4,092	35.38%	Chiew Chan Yew (DAP)	4,069	35.18%	11,685	23	51.38%
2021	N68 Tanjong Batu	Johnny Pang Leong Ming (SUPP)	4,092	35.38%	Yek Hock Siang (PBK)	2,204	19.05%	11,685	23	51.38%
2021	N68 Tanjong Batu	Johnny Pang Leong Ming (SUPP)	4,092	35.38%	Tang Eng Hui (PSB)	1,071	9.26%	11,685	23	51.38%
2021	N68 Tanjong Batu	Johnny Pang Leong Ming (SUPP)	4,092	35.38%	Chieng Lea Phing (ASPIRASI)	93	0.80%	11,685	23	51.38%
2021	N68 Tanjong Batu	Johnny Pang Leong Ming (SUPP)	4,092	35.38%	Wong Hau Ming (IND)	38	0.33%	11,685	23	51.38%
