= Ma'mun Sulaiman =

Malaysian politician (born 1965)

Ma'mun Sulaiman ASDK
- مأمون سليمان

Member of the Malaysian Parliament for Kalabakan
- In office 9 May 2018 – 19 November 2022
- Preceded by: Abdul Ghapur Salleh (BN–UMNO)
- Succeeded by: Andi Suryady (BN–UMNO)
- Majority: 3,187 (2018)

Personal details
- Born: 13 September 1965 (age 60) Kampung Melati, Burut Estate Bal, Jalan Merotai, Tawau, Sabah, Malaysia
- Citizenship: Malaysia
- Party: Heritage Party (WARISAN)
- Spouse: Warti Lakatu
- Relations: Chaya Sulaiman (Elder sister)
- Children: 5
- Occupation: Politician

Ma'mun bin Sulaiman is a Malaysian politician who served as the Member of Parliament (MP) for Kalabakan from May 2018 to November 2022. He is a Supreme Council member of the Heritage Party (WARISAN).

== Personal life ==
Ma'mun is the younger brother of United Malays National Organisation of Sabah (Sabah UMNO) Kalabakan Women Chief, Chaya Sulaiman. His spouse is Warti Lakatu and together they have 5 children named Nazrin Epizal, Azizi Rahman, Hafizul Ikmal, Eizlan Huzzaini and Izzety Sharmaine.

== Political career ==
=== 2018 general election ===
In the 2018 general election, his party of Heritage Party (WARISAN) fielded him to contest the Kalabakan parliamentary seat, facing the defending candidate Abdul Ghapur Salleh from the United Malays National Organisation (UMNO) and subsequently won. Unfortunately, he failed to defend his seat during the 2022 general election.

== Election results ==
Parliament of Malaysia
Year	Constituency	Candidate	Votes	Pct	Opponent(s)	Votes	Pct	Ballots cast	Majority	Turnout
2018	P191 Kalabakan	Ma'mun Sulaiman (WARISAN)	18,486	50.09%	Abdul Ghapur Salleh (Sabah UMNO)	15,299	41.45%	38,041	3,187	72.88%
2018	P191 Kalabakan	Ma'mun Sulaiman (WARISAN)	18,486	50.09%	Norbin Aloh (PAS)	2,813	7.62%	38,041	3,187	72.88%
2018	P191 Kalabakan	Ma'mun Sulaiman (WARISAN)	18,486	50.09%	Ahmad Lahama (PPRS)	311	0.84%	38,041	3,187	72.88%
2022	P191 Kalabakan	Ma'mun Sulaiman (WARISAN)	14,755	24.49%	Andi Muhammad Suryady Bandy (Sabah UMNO)	23,855	47.68%	60,791	9,100	59.58%
2022	P191 Kalabakan	Ma'mun Sulaiman (WARISAN)	14,755	24.49%	Noraini Abd Ghapur (PKR)	9,398	18.78%	60,791	9,100	59.58%
2022	P191 Kalabakan	Ma'mun Sulaiman (WARISAN)	14,755	24.49%	Nur Aini Abd Rahman (PEJUANG)	1,681	3.36%	60,791	9,100	59.58%
2022	P191 Kalabakan	Ma'mun Sulaiman (WARISAN)	14,755	24.49%	Muhamad Dhiauddin Hassan (IND)	341	0.68%	60,791	9,100	59.58%

Sabah State Legislative Assembly
Year	Constituency	Candidate	Votes	Pct	Opponent(s)	Votes	Pct	Ballots cast	Majority	Turnout
2025	N70 Kukusan	Ma'mun Sulaiman (WARISAN)	2,840	25.68%	Rina Jainal (IND)	3,490	31.56%	11,207	650	58.69%
2025	N70 Kukusan	Ma'mun Sulaiman (WARISAN)	2,840	25.68%	Samsiah Usman (PHRS)	2,063	18.65%	11,207	650	58.69%
2025	N70 Kukusan	Ma'mun Sulaiman (WARISAN)	2,840	25.68%	Chaya Sulaiman (Sabah UMNO)	1,588	14.36%	11,207	650	58.69%
2025	N70 Kukusan	Ma'mun Sulaiman (WARISAN)	2,840	25.68%	Francis @ Lawrance Yusop (Sabah BERSATU)	725	6.56%	11,207	650	58.69%
2025	N70 Kukusan	Ma'mun Sulaiman (WARISAN)	2,840	25.68%	Rahman Yahya (STAR)	125	1.13%	11,207	650	58.69%
2025	N70 Kukusan	Ma'mun Sulaiman (WARISAN)	2,840	25.68%	Hairul Amin @ Kenon (IND)	119	1.08%	11,207	650	58.69%
2025	N70 Kukusan	Ma'mun Sulaiman (WARISAN)	2,840	25.68%	Razik Muyong (IMPIAN)	45	0.41%	11,207	650	58.69%
2025	N70 Kukusan	Ma'mun Sulaiman (WARISAN)	2,840	25.68%	Ishak Ismail (PPRS)	39	0.35%	11,207	650	58.69%
2025	N70 Kukusan	Ma'mun Sulaiman (WARISAN)	2,840	25.68%	Mariani Sulaiman (ANAK NEGERI)	25	0.23%	11,207	650	58.69%

== Honours ==
- Sabah
  - Companion of the Order of Kinabalu (ASDK) (2018)
