= Sarifuddin Hata =

Malaysian politician (born 1974)

Yang Berhormat Tuan Sarifuddin Hata ASDK MLA
- شريف الدين حتى

State Assistant Minister of Finance of Sabah
- In office 16 May 2018 – 29 September 2020 Serving with Kenny Chua Teck Ho
- Governor: Juhar Mahiruddin
- Chief Minister: Shafie Apdal
- Minister: Shafie Apdal
- Preceded by: Ramlee Marhaban
- Succeeded by: Jasnih Daya
- Constituency: Merotai

Member of the Sabah State Legislative Assembly for Merotai
- Incumbent
- Assumed office 9 May 2018
- Preceded by: Pang Yuk Ming (BN–LDP)
- Majority: 2,150 (2018); 1,587 (2020); 4,016 (2025)

Personal details
- Born: Sarifuddin bin Hata; 11 March 1974 (age 52) Kalabakan, Crown Colony of North Borneo (now Sabah, Malaysia)
- Party: United Malays National Organisation of Sabah (Sabah UMNO) (until 2018); Heritage Party (WARISAN) (since 2018)
- Other political affiliations: Barisan Nasional (BN) (until 2018)
- Spouse: Hazlina Ismail
- Occupation: Politician

Sarifuddin bin Hata is a Malaysian politician who has served as Member of the Sabah State Legislative Assembly (MLA) for Merotai since May 2018. He served as the State Assistant Minister of Finance of Sabah in the Heritage Party (WARISAN) state administration under former Chief Minister and former Minister Shafie Apdal from May 2018 to the collapse of the WARSIAN state administration in September 2020. He is a member and Division Chief of Kalabakan of WARISAN and was a member of the United Malays National Organisation of Sabah (Sabah UMNO), a branch of a component party of the Barisan Nasional (BN) coalition.

== Election results ==
Sabah State Legislative Assembly
Year	Constituency	Candidate	Votes	Pct	Opponent(s)	Votes	Pct	Ballots cast	Majority	Turnout
2018	N58 Merotai	Sarifuddin Hata (WARISAN)	7,707	51.94%	Lim Ting Khai (LDP)	5,557	37.45%	15,263	2,150	74.00%
2018	N58 Merotai	Sarifuddin Hata (WARISAN)	7,707	51.94%	Ahmad Dullah (PAS)	1,209	8.15%	15,263	2,150	74.00%
2018	N58 Merotai	Sarifuddin Hata (WARISAN)	7,707	51.94%	Arbaani Akum (AMANAH)	193	1.30%	15,263	2,150	74.00%
2018	N58 Merotai	Sarifuddin Hata (WARISAN)	7,707	51.94%	Sharatha Masyaroh John Ridwan Lincon (PHRS)	125	0.84%	15,263	2,150	74.00%
2018	N58 Merotai	Sarifuddin Hata (WARISAN)	7,707	51.94%	Mohd Nasir Sumadi (USNO Baru)	28	0.19%	15,263	2,150	74.00%
2018	N58 Merotai	Sarifuddin Hata (WARISAN)	7,707	51.94%	Azizul Tandek (PKS)	20	0.13%	15,263	2,150	74.00%
2020	N72 Merotai	Sarifuddin Hata (WARISAN)	4,058	47.83%	Mohamad Jailani Chachu (Sabah BERSATU)	2,471	29.13%	8,484	1,587	56.66%
2020	N72 Merotai	Sarifuddin Hata (WARISAN)	4,058	47.83%	Liew Yun Fah (PHRS)	1,779	20.97%	8,484	1,587	56.66%
2020	N72 Merotai	Sarifuddin Hata (WARISAN)	4,058	47.83%	Abdullah Palile (PCS)	86	1.01%	8,484	1,587	56.66%
2020	N72 Merotai	Sarifuddin Hata (WARISAN)	4,058	47.83%	Hafeezatul Halimah Mohamad (USNO Baru)	60	0.71%	8,484	1,587	56.66%
2020	N72 Merotai	Sarifuddin Hata (WARISAN)	4,058	47.83%	Shim Nyat Yun (LDP)	30	0.35%	8,484	1,587	56.66%
2025	N72 Merotai	Sarifuddin Hata (WARISAN)	8,855	58.21%	Ruji Ubi (PKR)	4,839	31.81%	15,373	4,016	58.87%
2025	N72 Merotai	Sarifuddin Hata (WARISAN)	8,855	58.21%	Hasan Haris (PAS)	1,288	8.47%	15,373	4,016	58.87%
2025	N72 Merotai	Sarifuddin Hata (WARISAN)	8,855	58.21%	Rhyme @ Reymie Kassim (IMPIAN)	231	1.52%	15,373	4,016	58.87%

== Honours ==
- Sabah
  - Companion of the Order of Kinabalu (ASDK) (2018)
