= Rina Jainal =

Malaysian politician (born 1981)

Yang Berhormat Datuk Rina Jainal PGDK MLA
- رينا زينال

State Assistant Minister of Women, Health and Community Wellbeing of Sabah
- Incumbent
- Assumed office 2 December 2025
- Governor: Musa Aman
- Chief Minister: Hajiji Noor
- State Minister: Julita Mojungki
- Preceded by: Flovia Ng (as Assistant Minister of Community Development and People's Wellbeing)
- Constituency: Kukusan

Member of the Sabah State Legislative Assembly for Kukusan
- Incumbent
- Assumed office 3 September 2020
- Preceded by: Position established
- Majority: 10 (2020); 650 (2025)

Personal details
- Born: 1 September 1981 (age 44) Tawau, Sabah
- Citizenship: Malaysia
- Party: Heritage Party (WARISAN) (until 2022); Sabah People's Hope Party (2022–2025); Independent (since 2025)
- Other political affiliations: Gabungan Rakyat Sabah (GRS) (2023–2025)
- Education: SMK Kuhara
- Alma mater: Universiti Teknologi MARA
- Occupation: Politician
- Website: https://www.rinajainal.com

Rina binti Jainal (born 1 September 1981) is a Malaysian politician who has served as State Assistant Minister of Women, Health and Community Wellbeing of Sabah in the Gabungan Rakyat Sabah (GRS) state administration under Chief Minister Hajiji Noor since December 2025, as well as Member of Sabah State Legislative Assembly (MLA) for Kukusan since September 2020. She is currently an independent politician and formerly a member of the Heritage Party (WARISAN) and formerly the Deputy President of the Sabah People's Hope Party (PHRS), a component party of the GRS coalition.

== Election results ==
Sabah State Legislative Assembly
Year	Constituency	Candidate	Votes	Pct	Opponent(s)	Votes	Pct	Ballots cast	Majority	Turnout
2020	N70 Kukusan	Rina Jainal (WARISAN)	2,834	41.54%	Chaya Sulaiman (Sabah UMNO)	2,824	41.40%	6,769	10	53.97%
2020	N70 Kukusan	Rina Jainal (WARISAN)	2,834	41.54%	Wong Jin Soon (PHRS)	796	11.67%	6,769	10	53.97%
2020	N70 Kukusan	Rina Jainal (WARISAN)	2,834	41.54%	Ismail Idris (USNO Baru)	80	1.17%	6,769	10	53.97%
2020	N70 Kukusan	Rina Jainal (WARISAN)	2,834	41.54%	Taufik Muin (PCS)	75	1.10%	6,769	10	53.97%
2020	N70 Kukusan	Rina Jainal (WARISAN)	2,834	41.54%	Rosdiansa Mohd Noor (PPRS)	34	0.50%	6,769	10	53.97%
2020	N70 Kukusan	Rina Jainal (WARISAN)	2,834	41.54%	Lee Boon King (GAGASAN)	21	0.31%	6,769	10	53.97%
2025	N70 Kukusan	Rina Jainal (IND)	3,490	31.56%	Ma'mun Sulaiman (WARISAN)	2,840	25.68%	11,207	650	58.69%
2025	N70 Kukusan	Rina Jainal (IND)	3,490	31.56%	Samsiah Usman (PHRS)	2,063	18.65%	11,207	650	58.69%
2025	N70 Kukusan	Rina Jainal (IND)	3,490	31.56%	Chaya Sulaiman (Sabah UMNO)	1,588	14.36%	11,207	650	58.69%
2025	N70 Kukusan	Rina Jainal (IND)	3,490	31.56%	Francis @ Lawrance Yusop (Sabah BERSATU)	725	6.56%	11,207	650	58.69%
2025	N70 Kukusan	Rina Jainal (IND)	3,490	31.56%	Rahman Yahya (STAR)	125	1.13%	11,207	650	58.69%
2025	N70 Kukusan	Rina Jainal (IND)	3,490	31.56%	Hairul Amin @ Kenon (IND)	119	1.08%	11,207	650	58.69%
2025	N70 Kukusan	Rina Jainal (IND)	3,490	31.56%	Razik Muyong (IMPIAN)	45	0.41%	11,207	650	58.69%
2025	N70 Kukusan	Rina Jainal (IND)	3,490	31.56%	Ishak Ismail (PPRS)	39	0.35%	11,207	650	58.69%
2025	N70 Kukusan	Rina Jainal (IND)	3,490	31.56%	Mariani Sulaiman (ANAK NEGERI)	25	0.23%	11,207	650	58.69%

== Honours ==
- Sabah
  - Commander of the Order of Kinabalu (PGDK) - Datuk (2024)
