= Tanjong Batu (Sarawak state constituency) =

Electoral district in Sarawak, Malaysia

Tanjong Batu (N68)
Sarawak constituency

State constituency
- Legislature: Sarawak State Legislative Assembly
MLA
Vacant
- Constituency created: 2015
- First contested: 2016
- Last contested: 2026

Tanjong Batu is a state constituency in Sarawak, Malaysia, that has been represented in the Sarawak State Legislative Assembly since 2016.

The state constituency was created in the 2015 redistribution and is mandated to return a single member to the Sarawak State Legislative Assembly under the first past the post voting system.

== Demographics ==
Ethnic breakdown of Tanjong Batu's electorate as of 2022
1. Chinese (60.7%)
2. Sarawak bumiputera (23.0%)
3. Malay-Muslim bumiputera (15.2%)
4. Other ethnicities (1.10%)

== History ==
As of 2020, Tanjong Batu has a population of 73,917 people.

=== Polling districts ===
According to the gazette issued on 31 October 2022, the Tanjong Batu constituency has a total of 6 polling districts.

State constituency	Polling Districts	Code	Location
Tanjong Batu (N68)	Bintulu Town	217/68/01	Tadika Pimpin; Bangunan Persekutuan Perkumpulan Wanita Sarawak Daerah Bintulu (W.I); Bangunan Persatuan Bulan Sabit Merah Bintulu
Tanjong Batu (N68)	Bukit Orang	217/68/08	SK St. Anthony Bintulu
Tanjong Batu (N68)	Tanjung Batu	217/68/03	SJK (C) Chung Hua Tanjung Batu; SRA Majlis Islam Sarawak Bintu
Tanjong Batu (N68)	Li Hua	217/68/04	SMK Bintulu; SMK Bandar Bintulu; SK Asyakirin; SJK (C) Chung Hua 2
Tanjong Batu (N68)	Desa Damai	217/68/05	SJK (C) Siong Boon
Tanjong Batu (N68)	Batu Lima	217/68/06	Bilik Isolasi, SJK (C) Sebiew Chinese

=== Representation history ===
Members of the Legislative Assembly for Tanjong Batu
Assembly	No	Years	Member	Party
Constituency created, created from Kidurong and Jepak
18th	N68	2016–2021	Chiew Chiu Sing (周政新)	DAP
19th	N68	2021–2026	Johnny Pang Leong Ming (潘隆铭)	GPS (SUPP)

== Election results ==
Sarawak state election, 2026: Tanjong Batu
Party	Candidate	Votes	%	∆%
GPS				▲
PH				▲
Total valid votes				
Total rejected ballots				
Unreturned ballots				
Turnout				
Registered electors				
Majority				

Sarawak state election, 2021: Tanjong Batu
Party	Candidate	Votes	%	∆%
GPS	Johnny Pang Leong Ming	4,092	35.38	▲35.38
DAP	Chiew Chan Yew	4,069	35.18	▼23.92
PBK	Yek Hock Siang	2,204	19.05	▲19.05
PSB	Tang Eng Hui	1,071	9.26	▲9.26
ASPIRASI	Chieng Lea Phing	93	0.80	▲0.80
Independent	Wong Hau Ming	38	0.33	▲0.33
Total valid votes		11,567	100.00	
Total rejected ballots		69		
Unreturned ballots		49		
Turnout		11,685	51.38	▼17.84
Registered electors		22,743		
Majority		23	0.20	▼18.65
GPS gain		Swing		

Sarawak state election, 2016: Tanjong Batu
Party	Candidate	Votes	%	∆%
DAP	Chiew Chiu Sing	7,984	59.10	
BN	Pau Chiong Ung	5,436	40.24	
STAR	Chieng Lea Phing	89	0.66	
Total valid votes		13,509	100.00	
Total rejected ballots		96		
Unreturned ballots		14		
Turnout		13,619	69.22	
Registered electors		19,674		
Majority		2,548	18.85	
