= Hamisa Samat =

Malaysian politician

Yang Berbahagia Datuk Hamisa Samat PGDK
- حميده صمد

Ministerial roles (Sabah)
- 2013–2018: Assistant Minister of Resources and Information Technology Development

Faction represented in Sabah State Legislative Assembly
- 2008–2018: Barisan Nasional
- 2018–2020: Sabah Heritage Party

Personal details
- Born: Hamisa binti Samat; 28 December 1949 (age 76) Kalabakan, Crown Colony of North Borneo (now Sabah, Malaysia)
- Citizenship: Malaysian
- Party: United Malays National Organisation (UMNO) (until 2018); Sabah Heritage Party (WARISAN) (2018–2020)
- Other political affiliations: Barisan Nasional (BN) (until 2018); Perikatan Nasional (PN) (2020-present)
- Occupation: Politician

Hamisa binti Samat is a Malaysian politician who has been the Assistant State Minister. She served as the Member of Sabah State Legislative Assembly (MLA) for Tanjong Batu from March 2004 until September 2020. He was a member of the United Malays National Organisation (UMNO) which is aligned with the ruling Perikatan Nasional (PN) coalition both in federal and state levels.

== Election results ==
Sabah Legislative Assembly
Year	Constituency	Candidate	Votes	Pct	Opponent(s)	Votes	Pct	Ballots cast	Majority	Turnout
2008	N59 Tanjong Batu	Hamisa Samat (UMNO)	5,921	77.93%	Dullah Hashim (PKR)	1,499	19.73%	7,690	4,422	61.14%
2008	N59 Tanjong Batu	Hamisa Samat (UMNO)	5,921	77.93%	Mohammad Jeffry Rosman (IND)	178	2.34%	7,690	4,422	61.14%
2008	N59 Tanjong Batu	Hamisa Samat (UMNO)	5,921	77.93%	Dasun Sumbin (IND)	N/A		7,690	4,422	61.14%
2013	N59 Tanjong Batu	Hamisa Samat (UMNO)	10,858	77.08%	Fatmawaty Mohd Yusuf (PAS)	3,228	22.92%	14,338	7,630	78.20%
2018	N59 Tanjong Batu	Hamisa Samat (UMNO)	8,538	50.92%	Ismail Senang (WARISAN)	6,552	39.08%	17,335	1,986	72.40%
2018	N59 Tanjong Batu	Hamisa Samat (UMNO)	8,538	50.92%	Usman Madeaming (PAS)	1,506	8.98%	17,335	1,986	72.40%
2018	N59 Tanjong Batu	Hamisa Samat (UMNO)	8,538	50.92%	Ardi Arsah (PPRS)	171	1.02%	17,335	1,986	72.40%

== Honours ==
- Sabah
  - Commander of the Order of Kinabalu (PGDK) – Datuk (2006)
