= Abdul Ghapur Salleh =

Malaysian politician (1943–2023)

Yang Berbahagia Datuk Seri Panglima Abdul Ghapur Salleh SPDK PGDK
- عبدالغڤور صالح

Member of the Malaysian Parliament for Kalabakan
- In office 21 March 2004 – 9 May 2018
- Preceded by: Position established
- Succeeded by: Ma'mun Sulaiman (WARISAN)
- Majority: Walkover (2004); Walkover (2008); 14,221 (2013)

Personal details
- Born: 21 March 1943 Japanese-occupied British Borneo (now Sabah, Malaysia)
- Died: 4 July 2023 (aged 80) Kota Kinabalu, Sabah, Malaysia
- Party: Sabah People's United Front (BERJAYA); United Malays National Organisation (UMNO) (–2022)
- Other political affiliations: Barisan Nasional (BN) (–2022)
- Occupation: Politician

Abdul Ghapur bin Salleh (21 March 1943 – 4 July 2023) was a Malaysian politician who served as the Member of Parliament (MP) for the Kalabakan from March 2004 to May 2018. He was a member of the United Malays National Organisation (UMNO), a component party of the Barisan Nasional (BN) coalition.

Before entering federal politics, Abdul Ghapur was active in Sabah state politics, initially as a member of the Sabah People's United Front (commonly known as BERJAYA). He joined UMNO when it moved into the state in the early 1990s and was a Deputy Chief Minister in the Barisan Nasional state government between 1995 and 1997.

== Political career ==
Abdul Ghapur was elected unopposed to federal Parliament in 2004, for the newly created seat of Kalabakan on the border between Malaysia and Indonesia in East Sabah. In 2008, after his re-election (again unopposed), he was appointed a Deputy Minister for Resources and Natural Environment by Prime Minister Abdullah Badawi, only to resign eight days later. Later that year he openly criticised the BN government in Parliament for overlooking the needs of Sabah and Sarawak states, which had voted resoundingly in favour of BN in the 2008 election. He again spoke out against the federal government for what he considered to be its slow response to the invasion of part of eastern Sabah by Filipino militants in 2013. At the same time, he criticised UMNO's internal election process as being open to corruption, claiming that "people will do anything just to get on the Supreme Council even if it’s very expensive".

== Death ==
Abdul Ghapur died from kidney failure on 4 July 2023, at the age of 80.

== Election results ==
Parliament of Malaysia
Year	Constituency	Candidate	Votes	Pct	Opponent(s)	Votes	Pct	Ballots cast	Majority	Turnover
2004	P191 Kalabakan	Abdul Ghapur Salleh (UMNO)	Unopposed							
2008	P191 Kalabakan	Abdul Ghapur Salleh (UMNO)	Unopposed							
2013	P191 Kalabakan	Abdul Ghapur Salleh (UMNO)	23,125	65.87%	Usman Madeaming (PAS)	8,904	25.36%	36,230	14,221	77.43%
2013	P191 Kalabakan	Abdul Ghapur Salleh (UMNO)	23,125	65.87%	Mohd Manuke (IND)	1,313	3.74%	36,230	14,221	77.43%
2013	P191 Kalabakan	Abdul Ghapur Salleh (UMNO)	23,125	65.87%	Siamsir Borhan (IND)	891	2.54%	36,230	14,221	77.43%
2013	P191 Kalabakan	Abdul Ghapur Salleh (UMNO)	23,125	65.87%	Malvine Reyes (STAR)	603	1.72%	36,230	14,221	77.43%
2013	P191 Kalabakan	Abdul Ghapur Salleh (UMNO)	23,125	65.87%	Freddie Japat Simol (IND)	137	0.39%	36,230	14,221	77.43%
2013	P191 Kalabakan	Abdul Ghapur Salleh (UMNO)	23,125	65.87%	Yahya Zainal (IND)	132	0.38%	36,230	14,221	77.43%
2018	P191 Kalabakan	Abdul Ghapur Salleh (UMNO)	15,299	41.15%	Ma'mun Sulaiman (WARISAN)	18,486	50.09%	38,041	3,187	72.88%
2018	P191 Kalabakan	Abdul Ghapur Salleh (UMNO)	15,299	41.15%	Norbin Aloh (PAS)	2,813	7.62%	38,041	3,187	72.88%
2018	P191 Kalabakan	Abdul Ghapur Salleh (UMNO)	15,299	41.15%	Ahmad Lahama (PPRS)	311	0.84%	38,041	3,187	72.88%

== Honours ==
- Sabah
  - Grand Commander of the Order of Kinabalu (SPDK) – Datuk Seri Panglima (2005)
  - Commander of the Order of Kinabalu (PGDK) – Datuk (1994)
