= Kidurong =

Sarawak constituency

Defunct state constituency
- Legislature: Sarawak State Legislative Assembly
- Constituency created: 1987
- Constituency abolished: 2016
- First contested: 1991
- Last contested: 2011

Kidurong was a state constituency in Sarawak, Malaysia, that was represented in the Sarawak State Legislative Assembly from 1991 to 2016.

The state constituency was created in the 1987 redistribution and was mandated to return a single member to the Sarawak State Legislative Assembly under the first past the post voting system.

== History ==
It was abolished in 2016 after it was redistributed.

2006–2016: The constituency contains the polling districts of Bintulu Town, Sibiew Similajau, Bukit Orang, Tanjung Batu, Tanjung Kidurong, Suai, Li Hua, Melor, Mawar, RPR Kidurong.

=== Representation history ===
Members of the Legislative Assembly for Kidurong
| Assembly | No | Years | Member | Party |
Constituency created from Kemena
| 13th | N50 | 1991-1996 | Michael Sim Kiam Hui (沈劍輝) | BN (SSUPP) |
| 14th | N53 | 1996-1997 | Wong Sing Ai (黃聲愛) | DAP |
| 14th | N53 | 1997-2001 | Michael Sim Kiam Hui (沈劍輝) | BN (SSUPP) |
| 15th | N53 | 2001-2006 | Chiew Chiu Sing (周政新) | DAP |
| 16th | N59 | 2006–2011 | Chiew Chiu Sing (周政新) | DAP |
| 17th | N59 | 2011–2016 | Chiew Chiu Sing (周政新) | DAP |
Constituency abolished, split into Tanjong Batu and Samalaju

== Election results ==
Sarawak state election, 2011: Kidurong
| Party | Candidate | Votes | % | ∆% |
|---|---|---|---|---|
| DAP | Chiew Chiu Sing | 12,493 | 69.19 | ▲13.78 |
| BN | Henry Ling Kuong Meng | 5,563 | 30.81 | ▼13.78 |
| Total valid votes | | 18,056 | 100.00 | |
| Total rejected ballots | | 144 | | |
| Unreturned ballots | | 122 | | |
| Turnout | | 18,322 | 67.30 | ▲1.99 |
| Registered electors | | 27,225 | | |
| Majority | | 6,930 | 38.38 | ▲27.55 |
| DAP hold | | Swing | | {{{2}}} |
Source(s) "Federal Government Gazette - Results of Contested Election and Statements of the Poll after the Official Addition of Votes Sarawak [P.U. (B) 245/2011]" (PDF). Attorney General's Chambers of Malaysia. 29 April 2011.

Sarawak state election, 2006: Kidurong
| Party | Candidate | Votes | % | ∆% |
|---|---|---|---|---|
| DAP | Chiew Chiu Sing | 8,517 | 55.41 | ▲4.94 |
| BN | Paul Yong Khing Kee | 6,853 | 44.59 | ▼4.94 |
| Total valid votes | | 15,370 | 100.00 | |
| Total rejected ballots | | 86 | | |
| Unreturned ballots | | 39 | | |
| Turnout | | 15,495 | 65.31 | ▼3.11 |
| Registered electors | | 23,726 | | |
| Majority | | 1,664 | 10.83 | ▲9.87 |
| DAP hold | | Swing | | {{{2}}} |

Sarawak state election, 2001: Kidurong
| Party | Candidate | Votes | % | ∆% |
|---|---|---|---|---|
| DAP | Chiew Chiu Sing | 7,551 | 50.48 | ▲2.69 |
| BN | Michael Sim Kiam Hui | 7,408 | 49.52 | ▼1.70 |
| Total valid votes | | 14,959 | 100.00 | |
| Total rejected ballots | | 113 | | |
| Unreturned ballots | | 36 | | |
| Turnout | | 15,108 | 68.42 | ▲0.86 |
| Registered electors | | 22,082 | | |
| Majority | | 143 | 0.96 | ▼2.48 |
| DAP gain from BN | | Swing | | ? |

Sarawak state by-election, 25–26 October 1997: Kidurong Upon election declared null and void
| Party | Candidate | Votes | % | ∆% |
|---|---|---|---|---|
| BN | Michael Sim Kiam Hui | 5,723 | 51.23 | ▲1.33 |
| DAP | Wong Sing Ai | 5,339 | 47.79 | ▼2.32 |
| Independent | Asbor Abdullah | 81 | 0.73 | ▲0.73 |
| Independent | Ding Ringkai | 29 | 0.26 | ▲0.26 |
| Total valid votes | | 11,172 | 100.00 | |
| Total rejected ballots | | 99 | | |
| Unreturned ballots | | 16 | | |
| Turnout | | 11,287 | 67.56 | ▲3.60 |
| Registered electors | | 16,707 | | |
| Majority | | 384 | 3.44 | ▲3.22 |
| BN gain from DAP | | Swing | | ? |

Sarawak state election, 1996: Kidurong
| Party | Candidate | Votes | % | ∆% |
|---|---|---|---|---|
| DAP | Wong Sing Ai | 5,128 | 50.11 | ▲29.27 |
| BN | Michael Sim Kiam Hui | 5,106 | 49.89 | ▲5.42 |
| Total valid votes | | 10,234 | 100.00 | |
| Total rejected ballots | | 99 | | |
| Unreturned ballots | | 24 | | |
| Turnout | | 10,357 | 63.96 | ▼6.63 |
| Registered electors | | 16,194 | | |
| Majority | | 22 | 0.21 | ▼10.30 |
| DAP gain from BN | | Swing | | ? |

Sarawak state election, 1991: Kidurong
| Party | Candidate | Votes | % |
|---|---|---|---|
| BN | Michael Sim Kiam Hui | 5,710 | 44.47 |
| PBDS | Ting Ling Kiew | 4,360 | 33.96 |
| DAP | Chiew Chiu Sing | 2,676 | 20.84 |
| NEGARA | Menjang Mawar | 94 | 0.73 |
| Total valid votes | | 12,840 | 100.00 |
| Total rejected ballots | | 107 | |
| Unreturned ballots | | 14 | |
| Turnout | | 12,961 | 70.58 |
| Registered electors | | 18,363 | |
| Majority | | 1,350 | 10.51 |
This was a new constituency created.
