= Merotai =

Political subdivision in Malaysia

Merotai (N72)
Sabah constituency

State constituency
- Legislature: Sabah State Legislative Assembly
MLA
Sarifuddin Hata
Heritage
- Constituency created: 1967
- First contested: 1967
- Last contested: 2025

Demographics
- Electors (2025): 26,179

Merotai is a state constituency in Sabah, Malaysia, that is represented in the Sabah State Legislative Assembly.

== Demographics ==
As of 2020, Merotai has a population of 64,425 people.

Ethnic breakdown of Merotai's electorate as of 2025
1. Muslim Bumiputera (93.0%)
2. Non-Muslim Bumiputera (4.00%)
3. Chinese (3.00%)
4. Other ethnicities (0.00%)

== History ==
=== Polling districts ===
According to the gazette issued on 31 October 2022, the Merotai constituency has a total of 6 polling districts.

State constituency	Polling District	Code	Location
Merotai (N72)	Brumas	191/72/01	SK Brumas
Merotai (N72)	Kijang	191/72/02	SK Merotai Besar
Merotai (N72)	Bombalai	191/72/03	SMK Abaka; SK Bombalai; SK Sungai Haji Matahir
Merotai (N72)	Air Panas	191/72/04	SK St Patrick
Merotai (N72)	Semarak	191/72/05	Kolej Vokesional Tawau
Merotai (N72)	Merotai	191/72/06	SMK Merotai Besar; SK Merotai Kecil

=== Representation history ===
Member of Sabah State Legislative Assembly for Merotai
Assembly	No	Years	Member	Party
Constituency created
3rd	N31	1969 – 1971	Mohamed Kassim Kamidin	Alliance (USNO)
4th	N31	1971 – 1976	Mohamed Kassim Kamidin	Alliance (USNO)
5th	N46	1976 – 1981	Mohamed Tambi	Alliance (USNO)
6th	N46	1981 – 1985	Abdul Ghapur Salleh	BN (BERJAYA)
7th	N43	1985 – 1986	Abdul Ghapur Salleh	BN (BERJAYA)
8th	N43	1986 – 1990	Mohd Said Senang	USNO
9th	N43	1990	Mohd Said Senang	USNO
9th	N43	1990 – 1994	Mohd Said Senang	BN (UMNO)
10th	N43	1994 – 1999	Abdul Ghapur Salleh	BN (UMNO)
11th	N46	1999 – 2004	Patawari Patawe	BN (UMNO)
12th	N58	2004 – 2008	Liew Yun Fah (劉榮華)	BN (LDP)
13th	N58	2008 – 2013	Pang Yuk Ming (彭育明)	BN (LDP)
14th	N58	2013 – 2018	Pang Yuk Ming (彭育明)	BN (LDP)
15th	N58	2018 – 2020	Sarifuddin Hata	WARISAN
16th	N72	2020 – 2025	Sarifuddin Hata	WARISAN
17th	N72	2025–present	Sarifuddin Hata	WARISAN

== Election results ==
Sabah state election, 2025: Merotai
Party	Candidate	Votes	%	∆%
Heritage	Sarifuddin Hata	8,855	58.21	▲11.23
PH	Ruji Ubi	4,839	31.81	▲31.81
PN	Hasan Haris	1,288	8.47	▼20.14
Sabah Dream Party	Rhyme Kassim	231	1.52	▲1.52
Total valid votes		15,213		
Total rejected ballots		160		
Unreturned ballots		38		
Turnout		15,411	58.87	▲1.18
Registered electors		26,179		
Majority		4,016	26.40	▲8.03
Sabah Heritage Party hold		Swing		
Source(s) "RESULTS OF CONTESTED ELECTION AND STATEMENTS OF THE POLL AFTER THE OFFICIAL ADDITION OF VOTES" (PDF).

Sabah state election, 2020: Merotai
Party	Candidate	Votes	%	∆%
Sabah Heritage Party	Sarifuddin Hata	4,058	46.98	▼3.51
PN	Mohamad Jalani Chachu	2,471	28.61	▲28.61
Sabah People's Hope Party	Liew Yun Fah	1,779	20.60	▲19.78
Love Sabah Party	Abdullah Palile	86	1.00	▲1.00
USNO (Baru)	Hafeezatul Halimah Mohamad	60	0.69	▲0.51
LDP	Shim Nyat Yun	30	0.35	▲0.35
Total valid votes		8,484	98.22	
Total rejected ballots		125	1.45	
Unreturned ballots		29	0.34	
Turnout		8,638	57.69	▼16.28
Registered electors		14,973		
Majority		1,587	18.37	▲4.29
Sabah Heritage Party hold		Swing		
Source(s) "RESULTS OF CONTESTED ELECTION AND STATEMENTS OF THE POLL AFTER THE OFFICIAL ADDITION OF VOTES".

Sabah state election, 2018: Merotai
Party	Candidate	Votes	%	∆%
Sabah Heritage Party	Sarifuddin Hata	7,707	50.49	▲50.49
BN	Lim Ting Khai	5,557	36.41	▼20.09
PAS	Ahmad Dullah	1,209	7.92	▼19.87
Amanah	Arbaani Akum	193	1.26	▲1.26
Sabah People's Hope Party	Sharata Masyaroh John Ridwan Lincoln	125	0.82	▲0.82
USNO (Baru)	Mohd Nasir Sumadi	28	0.18	▲0.18
Sabah Nationality Party	Azizul Tandek	20	0.13	▲0.13
Total valid votes		14,839	97.22	
Total rejected ballots		275	1.80	
Unreturned ballots		149	0.98	
Turnout		15,263	73.97	▼3.77
Registered electors		20,634		
2,150		14.08	▼14.63	
Sabah Heritage Party gain from BN		Swing		?
Source(s) "RESULTS OF CONTESTED ELECTION AND STATEMENTS OF THE POLL AFTER THE OFFICIAL ADDITION OF VOTES".

Sabah state election, 2013: Merotai
Party	Candidate	Votes	%	∆%
BN	Pang Yuk Ming	8,045	56.50	▲14.08
PAS	Ahmad Dullah	3,957	27.79	▲17.18
Independent	Chin Chee Syn	1,255	8.81	▲8.81
Independent	Mohd Manuke	342	2.40	▲2.40
SAPP	Ho Shau Vui	221	1.55	▲1.55
Independent	Rita Rudiansah Abu Bakar	104	0.73	▲0.73
Total valid votes		13,924	97.78	
Total rejected ballots		238	1.67	
Unreturned ballots		78	0.55	
Turnout		14,240	77.74	▲14.74
Registered electors		18,317		
Majority		4,088	28.71	▲25.95
BN hold		Swing		
Source(s) "KEPUTUSAN PILIHAN RAYA UMUM DEWAN UNDANGAN NEGERI".

Sabah state election, 2008: Merotai
Party	Candidate	Votes	%	∆%
BN	Pang Yuk Ming	3,723	42.42	▼25.29
Independent	Soon Ten Fook	3,481	39.66	▲39.66
PAS	Mohamad Tingka	931	10.61	▼2.56
Independent	Moktar Ahmad	289	3.29	▼2.30
Independent	Salman Nurillah	286	3.26	▲3.26
Total valid votes		8,710	99.24	
Total rejected ballots		67	0.76	
Unreturned ballots		0	0.00	
Turnout		8,777	63.00	▲3.88
Registered electors		13,931		
Majority		242	2.76	▼51.78
BN hold		Swing		
Source(s) "KEPUTUSAN PILIHAN RAYA UMUM DEWAN UNDANGAN NEGERI SABAH BAGI TAHUN 2008".

Sabah state election, 2004: Merotai
Party	Candidate	Votes	%	∆%
BN	Liew Yun Fah	5,344	67.71	▲26.33
PAS	Usman Madeaming	1,039	13.17	▲10.24
Independent	Foo Chee King	584	7.40	▲7.40
Independent	Moktar Ahmad	441	5.59	▲5.59
Independent	Abdul Gaffar Mohd Nor	405	5.13	▲5.13
Total valid votes		7,813	99.00	
Total rejected ballots		79	1.00	
Unreturned ballots		0	0.00	
Turnout		7,892	59.12	▼6.08
Registered electors		13,348		
Majority		4,305	54.54	▲46.31
BN hold		Swing		
Source(s) "KEPUTUSAN PILIHAN RAYA UMUM DEWAN UNDANGAN NEGERI SABAH BAGI TAHUN 2004".

Sabah state election, 1999: Merotai
Party	Candidate	Votes	%	∆%
BN	Patawari Patawe	5,265	41.38	▼30.53
PBS	Majin Ajin	4,218	33.15	▲7.74
BERSEKUTU	Mohd Ishak Awadan	2,653	20.85	▲20.85
PAS	Abdurahman Ahmad @ Maidin	373	2.93	▲1.69
Independent	Bacho Pendrongi	113	0.89	▲0.89
Total valid votes		12,622	99.21	
Total rejected ballots		101	0.79	
Unreturned ballots		0	0.00	
Turnout		12,723	65.20	▼5.70
Registered electors		19,515		
Majority		1,047	8.23	▼38.27
BN hold		Swing		
Source(s) "KEPUTUSAN PILIHAN RAYA UMUM DEWAN UNDANGAN NEGERI SABAH BAGI TAHUN 1999".

Sabah state election, 1994: Merotai
Party	Candidate	Votes	%	∆%
BN	Abdul Ghapur Salleh	9,515	71.91	▲22.27
PBS	Mohd Said Senang	3,362	25.41	▼11.00
PAS	Mohamad Tingka	164	1.24	▲1.24
BERSEKUTU	Hamud Salleh	54	0.41	▲0.41
Total valid votes		13,095	98.97	
Total rejected ballots		136	1.03	
Unreturned ballots		0	0.00	
Turnout		13,231	70.90	▼0.31
Registered electors		18,662		
Majority		6,153	46.50	▲33.27
BN hold		Swing		
Source(s) "KEPUTUSAN PILIHAN RAYA UMUM DEWAN UNDANGAN NEGERI SABAH BAGI TAHUN 1994".

Sabah state election, 1990: Merotai
Party	Candidate	Votes	%	∆%
USNO	Mohd Said Senang	5,372	49.64	▼11.89
PBS	Syed Abas Syed Ali	3,940	36.41	▼0.89
BERJAYA	Ramlee Rashida	1,202	11.11	▲11.11
PRS	Rosaidy Landang	164	1.52	▲1.52
Total valid votes		10,678	98.67	
Total rejected ballots		144	1.33	
Unreturned ballots		0	0.00	
Turnout		10,822	71.21	▼0.01
Registered electors		15,197		
Majority		1,432	13.23	▼11.00
USNO hold		Swing		
Source(s) "KEPUTUSAN PILIHAN RAYA UMUM DEWAN UNDANGAN NEGERI SABAH BAGI TAHUN 1990".

Sabah state election, 1986: Merotai
Party	Candidate	Votes	%	∆%
USNO	Mohd Said Senang	5,052	61.53	▲30.17
PBS	Syed Abas Syed Ali	3,062	37.30	▲21.07
Total valid votes		8,114		
Total rejected ballots		96		
Unreturned ballots		0		
Turnout		8,210	71.00	▼1.00
Registered electors		11,527		
Majority		1,990	24.52	▲8.91
USNO gain from BERJAYA		Swing		?
Source(s) "KEPUTUSAN PILIHAN RAYA UMUM DEWAN UNDANGAN NEGERI SABAH BAGI TAHUN 1986".

Sabah state election, 1985: Merotai
Party	Candidate	Votes	%	∆%
BERJAYA	Abdul Ghapur Salleh	3,297	46.97	▼7.47
USNO	Semanis Mohd Salleh	2,201	31.36	▼7.87
Sabah United Party	Rasman Maridin	1,139	16.23	▲16.23
BERSEPADU	Abdullah Burairah	349	4.97	▲4.97
BERSATU	Kerean Buji	20	0.28	▲0.28
Independent	Mohamad Yatim Mohd Kadas	13	0.19	▲0.19
Total valid votes		7,019		
Total rejected ballots		103		
Unreturned ballots		0		
Turnout		7,122	70.00	▼3.00
Registered electors		10,111		
Majority		1,096	15.61	▲0.40
BERJAYA hold		Swing		

Sabah state election, 1981: Merotai
Party	Candidate	Votes	%	∆%
BERJAYA	Abdul Ghapur Salleh	2,635	54.46	▲13.08
USNO	Abdullah Burairah	1,898	39.23	▼19.39
United Pasok Nunukragang Organisation	Joseph Mosusah	305	6.30	▲6.30
Total valid votes		4,838		
Total rejected ballots		110		
Unreturned ballots		0		
Turnout		4,948	73.00	▼1.00
Registered electors		6,823		
Majority		737	15.23	▼1.99
BERJAYA gain		Swing		

Sabah state election, 1976: Merotai
Party	Candidate	Votes	%	∆%
USNO	Mohamed Tambi	2,016	58.62	
BERJAYA	Abdul Ghapur Salleh	1,423	41.38	
Total valid votes		3,439		
Total rejected ballots		114		
Unreturned ballots		0		
Turnout		3,553	74.00	
Registered electors		4,817		
Majority		593	17.24	
USNO hold		Swing		

Sabah state election, 1971: Merotai
Party	Candidate	Votes	%	∆%
On the nomination day, Mohammed Kassim Kamidin won uncontested.
USNO	Mohammed Kassim Kamidin			
Total valid votes				
Total rejected ballots				
Unreturned ballots				
Turnout				
Registered electors		0		
Majority				
USNO hold		Swing		

Sabah state election, 1967: Merotai
Party	Candidate	Votes	%	∆%
On the nomination day, Mohammed Kassim Kamidin won uncontested.
USNO	Mohammed Kassim Kamidin			
Total valid votes				
Total rejected ballots				
Unreturned ballots				
Turnout				
Registered electors		3,262		
Majority				
This was a new seat created
