= Tanjung Batu (Sabah state constituency) =

State constituency in Sabah, Malaysia

Sabah constituency

State constituency
- Legislature: Sabah State Legislative Assembly
MLA
Andi Muhammad Shamsureezal
GRS
- Constituency created: 2003
- First contested: 2004
- Last contested: 2025

Demographics
- Population (2020): 41,931
- Electors (2025): 27,428

Tanjung Batu is a state constituency in Sabah, Malaysia, that is represented in the Sabah State Legislative Assembly.

== Demographics ==
As of 2020, Tanjung Batu has a population of 41,931 people.

Ethnic breakdown of Tanjung Batu's electorate as of 2025
1. Muslim Bumiputera (82.0%)
2. Chinese (11.0%)
3. Non-Muslim Bumiputera (6.00%)
4. Other ethnicities (1.00%)

== History ==
=== Polling districts ===
According to the gazette issued on 31 October 2022, the Tanjung Batu constituency has a total of 3 polling districts.

State constituency	Polling District	Code	Location
Tanjung Batu (N71)	Pasir Putih	191/71/01	SMK Pasir Putih
Tanjung Batu (N71)	Tanjung Batu	191/71/02	SK Tanjong Batu; Dewan Kompleks Sukan Tawau
Tanjung Batu (N71)	Keramat	191/71/03	SK Tg Batu Keramat

=== Representation history ===
Members of the Legislative Assembly for Tanjong Batu
Assembly	No	Years	Member	Party
Constituency created from Merotai and Kalabakan
Tanjong Batu
12th	N58	2004 – 2008	Mohd Kamil Mohd Kassim	BN (UMNO)
13th	N58	2008 – 2013	Hamisa Samat	BN (UMNO)
14th	N58	2013 – 2018	Hamisa Samat	BN (UMNO)
15th	N58	2018	Hamisa Samat	BN (UMNO)
15th	N58	2018 – 2020	Hamisa Samat	WARISAN
15th	N58	2020	Hamisa Samat	Independent
Tanjung Batu
16th	N71	2020 – 2025	Andi Muhammad Suryady Bandy	BN (UMNO)
17th	N71	2025–present	Andi Md Shamsureezal Mohd Sainal	GRS (GAGASAN)

== Election results ==
Sabah state election, 2025
Party	Candidate	Votes	%	∆%
GRS	Andi Rizal	5,492	34.77	▲34.77
BN	Samasuddin Yusop	4,511	28.56	▼31.99
Sabah Heritage Party	Ayuf Abdul Rahman	3,228	20.44	▼12.92
PN	Ahmad Dullah	2,426	15.36	▲15.36
Sabah Dream Party	Zanudin Mingo	139	0.88	▲0.88
Total valid votes		15,798		
Total rejected ballots		192		
Unreturned ballots		54		
Turnout		16,042	58.49	▲5.99
Registered electors		27,428		
Majority		981	6.21	▼20.98
GRS gain from BN		Swing		GRS
Source(s) "KEPUTUSAN PILIHAN RAYA YANG DIPERTANDINGKAN DAN PENYATA PENGUNDIAN SELEPAS PENJUMLAHAN RASMI UNDI" (PDF).

Sabah state election, 2020
Party	Candidate	Votes	%	∆%
BN	Andi Muhammad Suryady Bandy	4,728	60.55	▲12.34
Sabah Heritage Party	Mohd Afsar Abdul Latif	2,605	33.36	▼4.44
Love Sabah Party	Rudy Nurdin	130	1.66	▲1.66
Sabah People's Unity Party	Kamshari Johari Ibrahim	79	1.01	▲0.02
USNO (Baru)	Zulkifli Ahmad	58	0.74	▲0.74
Independent	Asmari Udoh	16	0.20	▲0.20
Total valid votes		7,616	97.53	
Total rejected ballots		142	1.82	
Unreturned ballots		51	0.65	
Turnout		7,809	52.50	▼19.88
Registered electors		14,875		
Majority		2,123	27.19	▲16.78
BN hold		Swing		
Source(s) "RESULTS OF CONTESTED ELECTION AND STATEMENTS OF THE POLL AFTER THE OFFICIAL ADDITION OF VOTES".

Sabah state election, 2018
Party	Candidate	Votes	%	∆%
BN	Hamisa Samat	8,358	48.21	▼27.33
Sabah Heritage Party	Ismail Senang	6,552	37.80	▲37.80
PAS	Usman Madeaming	1,506	8.69	▼13.77
Sabah People's Unity Party	Ardi Arsah @ Samsi	171	0.99	▲0.99
Total valid votes		16,767	96.72	
Total rejected ballots		451	2.60	
Unreturned ballots		117	0.67	
Turnout		17,335	72.38	▼5.80
Registered electors		23,951		
Majority		1,986	10.41	▼42.67
BN hold		Swing		
Source(s) "RESULTS OF CONTESTED ELECTION AND STATEMENTS OF THE POLL AFTER THE OFFICIAL ADDITION OF VOTES".

Sabah state election, 2013
Party	Candidate	Votes	%	∆%
BN	Hamisa Samat	10,858	75.54	▼1.46
PAS	Fatmawaty Mohd Yusuf	3,228	22.46	▲22.46
Total valid votes		14,086	98.00	
Total rejected ballots		252	1.75	
Unreturned ballots		36	0.25	
Turnout		14,374	78.18	▲17.04
Registered electors		18,386		
Majority		7,630	53.08	▼4.43
BN hold		Swing		
Source(s) "KEPUTUSAN PILIHAN RAYA UMUM DEWAN UNDANGAN NEGERI". Archived from the original on 2022-10-16.

Sabah state election, 2008
Party	Candidate	Votes	%	∆%
BN	Hamisa Samat	5,921	77.00	▼9.64
PKR	Dullah Hashim	1,499	19.49	▲19.49
Independent	Mohammad Jeffry Rosman	178	2.31	▲2.31
Total valid votes		7,598	98.80	
Total rejected ballots		92	1.20	
Unreturned ballots		0	0.00	
Turnout		7,690	61.14	▲3.41
Registered electors		12,577		
Majority		4,422	57.51	▼17.39
BN hold		Swing		
Source(s) "KEPUTUSAN PILIHAN RAYA UMUM DEWAN UNDANGAN NEGERI SABAH BAGI TAHUN 2008".

Sabah state election, 2004
Party	Candidate	Votes	%
BN	Mohd Kamil Mohd Kassim	5,784	86.64
SETIA	Mir Durahman	784	11.74
Total valid votes		6,568	98.38
Total rejected ballots		108	1.62
Unreturned ballots		0	0.00
Turnout		6,676	57.73
Registered electors		11,564	
Majority		5,000	74.90
This was a new constituency created.
Source(s) "KEPUTUSAN PILIHAN RAYA UMUM DEWAN UNDANGAN NEGERI SABAH BAGI TAHUN 2004".
