= List of Malaysian electoral districts =

These are the list of federal constituencies (Bahagian Pilihan Raya Persekutuan) followed by the state constituencies (Bahagian Pilihan Raya Negeri) in Malaysia.

Each federal constituency contains 2 to 6 state constituencies, except in the Federal Territories where there are only federal constituencies. Constituency boundaries and administrative district boundaries may transcend each other and does not correspond with each other in most instances, but federal constituencies may not transcend across state borders. Federal constituencies are denoted by P.xxx, while state constituencies are denoted by N.xx.

Article 46 of the Malaysian Federal Constitution prescribes the composition of the House of Representatives. From Merdeka Day (1957) until 1963 only the total number of seats were specified. From 1963 until 1973 the seats were grouped into the States of Malaya (104 seats), Sabah (16 members), Sarawak (24 members) and Singapore (15 members until 1965). From 1973 onwards the number of seats per state and Federal Territory were prescribed and changed with subsequent constitutional amendments, the last being in 2006. There are in total 222 federal and 600 state electoral districts nationwide. Within each state the number of constituents in each district is not necessarily equal as Schedule 13, Part 2(c) of the Constitution requires a greater weightage to be given to rural districts. Until 1962 any variation was restricted to no more than fifteen percent from the average number of constituents per district across a state.

Electoral district boundaries are not permanent and the Election Commission may review and re-delineate boundaries at an interval of not less than 8 years. The last delineation exercise was made in 2018. On 17 July 2019, Dewan Rakyat approved Sabah state constituencies to increased from 60 to 73 seats thus they are used for snap election in 2020.

== Summary ==
=== By area ===
Official source

| State / federal territory | Area (km^{2}) | Federal constituency | | | | State constituency | | | |
| State / federal territory | Area (km^{2}) | Seats | Average area (km^{2}) | Largest (km^{2}) | Smallest (km^{2}) | Seats | Average area (km^{2}) | Largest (km^{2}) | Smallest (km^{2}) |
|---|---|---|---|---|---|---|---|---|---|
| Malaysia (Nationwide) | 330,803 | 222 | 1,490 | 34,080; Hulu Rajang | 6 Tanjong | 600 | 551 | 11,607; Baleh | 1 Pengkalan Kota |
| Perlis | 813 | 3 | 271 | 450; Padang Besar | 141; Kangar | 15 | 54 | 150; Chuping | 6 Indera Kayangan |
| Kedah | 9,459 | 15 | 631 | 1,645; Sik | 111; Alor Setar | 36 | 263 | 1,322; Belantek | 7 Kota Darul Aman |
| Kelantan | 15,027 | 14 | 1,073 | 8,174; Gua Musang | 33; Kota Bharu | 45 | 334 | 3,046; Paloh | 5 Kota Lama |
| Terengganu | 13,001 | 8 | 1,625 | 3,973; Hulu Terengganu | 57; Kuala Terengganu | 32 | 406 | 3,246; Telemung | 5 Bandar |
| Penang | 1,051 | 13 | 81 | 178; Nibong Tebal | 6 Tanjong | 40 | 26 | 84; Sungai Bakap | 1 Pengkalan Kota |
| Perak | 20,990 | 24 | 875 | 4,521; Gerik | 37; Ipoh Barat | 59 | 356 | 3,998; Temenggor | 8 Pasir Pinji |
| Pahang | 35,950 | 14 | 2,568 | 7,273; Jerantut | 165; Kuantan | 42 | 856 | 5,813; Tahan | 12; Teruntum |
| Selangor | 7,961 | 22 | 362 | 1,712; Hulu Selangor | 20; Pandan | 56 | 142 | 617; Kuala Kubu Baharu | 7 Kampung Tunku; Pandan Indah |
| Kuala Lumpur | 243 | 11 | 22 | 51; Segambut | 12; Kepong | | | | |
| Putrajaya | 49 | 1 | | | | | | | |
| Negeri Sembilan | 6,662 | 8 | 833 | 1,717; Jelebu | 234; Rasah | 36 | 185 | 720; Chennah | 6 Temiang |
| Malacca | 1,667 | 6 | 278 | 560; Alor Gajah | 66; Kota Melaka | 28 | 59 | 214; Asahan | 5 Bandar Hilir |
| Johor | 19,119 | 26 | 735 | 2,849; Mersing | 35; Johor Bahru | 56 | 341 | 1,745; Tenggaroh | 11; Bentayan |
| Labuan | 96 | 1 | | | | | | | |
| Sabah | 73,904 | 25 | 2,956 | 17,877; Kinabatangan | 39; Sandakan | 73 | 1,232 | 10,954; Kuamut | 4 Api-Api; Tanjong Papat |
| Sarawak | 124,451 | 31 | 4,015 | 34,080; Hulu Rajang | 35; Bandar Kuching | 82 (99) | 1,518 | 11,607; Baleh | 6 Padungan |

=== By registered voters ===
Official source

| State / federal territory | Population (2020 census) | Registered voters (2022) | % of registered voters | Expected Federal seats (of 222) | Federal constituency | | | | State constituency (not accurate) | | | | |
| State / federal territory | Population (2020 census) | Registered voters (2022) | % of registered voters | Expected Federal seats (of 222) | Actual Seats | Average voters | Highest voters | Lowest voters | Seats | Average voters | Highest voters | Lowest voters | |
|---|---|---|---|---|---|---|---|---|---|---|---|---|---|
| Malaysia (Nationwide) | 32,447,385 | 21,173,638 | 100.0% | 222 | 222 | 95,377 | 303,430; Bangi | 28,290; Igan | 600 | 35,289 | 74,023; Subang Jaya | 6,749; Sadong Jaya | |
| Perlis | N/A | 195,927 | 0.9% | 2 | 3 | 65,309 | 74,859; Kangar | 60,192; Padang Besar | 15 | 13,061 | 12,303; Sena | 7,617; Mata Ayer | |
| Kedah | N/A | 1,456,915 | 6.9% | 15 | 15 | 97,127 | 168,847; Sungai Petani | 59,806; Padang Terap | 36 | 40,469 | 50,336; Lunas | 21,297; Ayer Hangat | |
| Kelantan | N/A | 1,404,762 | 6.6% | 15 | 14 | 100,340 | 149,371; Tumpat | 59,798; Jeli | 45 | 31,216 | 35,135; Bukit Panau | 11,848; Dabong | |
| Terengganu | N/A | 922,856 | 4.4% | 10 | 8 | 115,357 | 139,423; Kemaman | 87,917; Hulu Terengganu | 32 (41) | 28,839 | 32,714; Batu Buruk | 14,493; Bukit Besi | |
| Penang | N/A | 1,226,626 | 5.8% | 13 | 13 | 94,355 | 119,640; Bayan Baru | 52,803; Tanjong | 40 | 30,665 | 46,741; Paya Terubong | 13,509; Air Putih | |
| Perak | N/A | 2,036,872 | 9.6% | 21 | 24 | 84,869 | 160,558; Tambun | 36,950; Lenggong | 59 | 34,523 | 57,817; Manjoi | 12,787; Kota Tampan | |
| Pahang | N/A | 1,129,444 | 5.3% | 12 | 14 | 80,674 | 120,549; Indera Mahkota | 46,020; Cameron Highlands | 42 | 26,891 | 38,721; Beserah | 8,652; Benta | |
| Selangor | N/A | 3,677,848 | 17.4% | 39 | 22 | 167,174 | 303,430; Bangi | 51,609; Sabak Bernam | 56 | 65,675 | 74,023; Subang Jaya | 16,274; Sungai Air Tawar | |
| Kuala Lumpur | N/A | 1,271,730 | 6.0% | 13 | 11 | 115,611 | 124,805; Seputeh | 79,782; Bukit Bintang | — | — | — | — | |
| Putrajaya | N/A | 42,881 | 0.2% | 0 | 1 | — | — | — | — | — | — | — | — |
| Negeri Sembilan | N/A | 850,865 | 4.0% | 9 | 8 | 106,358 | 157,244; Seremban | 59,561; Jelebu | 36 | 23,635 | 36,213; Paroi | 8,076; Senaling | |
| Malacca | N/A | 657,324 | 3.1% | 7 | 6 | 109,554 | 164,140; Kota Melaka | 69,174; Masjid Tanah | 28 | 23,475 | 37,355; Kesidang | 8,743; Taboh Naning | |
| Johor | N/A | 2,596,575 | 12.3% | 27 | 26 | 99,868 | 223,301; Tebrau | 49,846; Labis | 56 | 46,367 | 70,928; Skudai | 17,834; Bukit Naning | |
| Labuan | N/A | 44,484 | 0.2% | 0 | 1 | — | — | — | — | — | — | — | — |
| Sabah | N/A | 1,599,933 | 7.6% | 17 | 25 | 63,997 | 108,370; Sepanggar | 40,763; Kimanis | 73 | 21,916 | 35,454; Sungai Sibuga | 7,614; Sebatik | |
| Sarawak | N/A | 1,840,834 | 8.7% | 19 | 31 | 59,381 | 143,229; Miri | 28,290; Igan | 82 (99) | 22,449 | 34,626; Pelawan | 6,749; Sadong Jaya | |

== Perlis ==
| Federal constituency | State constituency | Polling districts | |
|---|---|---|---|
| P.001 Padang Besar | N.01 Titi Tinggi | 7 | Jalan Padang Besar, Titi Tinggi, FELDA Mata Ayer, Kampong Kastam, Padang Besar, FELDA Rimba Mas, Lubok Sireh |
| P.001 Padang Besar | N.02 Beseri | 5 | Pekan Kaki Bukit, Tasoh, Guar Jentik, Beseri, Tunjong |
| P.001 Padang Besar | N.03 Chuping | 6 | Panggas, Sungai Buloh, Kilang Gula Chuping, Kubang Perun, Guar Nangka, FELDA Chuping |
| P.001 Padang Besar | N.04 Mata Ayer | 3 | Tok Kaya Man, Hutan Temin, Kampung Gial |
| P.001 Padang Besar | N.05 Santan | 6 | Kampong Darat, Paya, Alor Tampang, Padang Lati, Padang Pauh, Santan |
| P.002 Kangar | N.06 Bintong | 6 | Nesam, Abi, Kechor, Hutan Melintang, Telok Kachang, Wang Bintong |
| P.002 Kangar | N.07 Sena | 7 | Kampong Sanglang, Repoh, Alor Lanchang, Taman Indera, Tok Peduka, Padang Bohor, Padang Petani |
| P.002 Kangar | N.08 Indera Kayangan | 7 | Padang Katong, Derma, Pekan Lama Kangar, Pengkalan Assam, Pekan Baru Kangar, Seberang Bakau, Behor Gandin |
| P.002 Kangar | N.09 Kuala Perlis | 5 | Seberang Alor, Hujong Tanjong, Kepala Batas, Seberang Tok Pi, Padang Besar Selatan |
| P.002 Kangar | N.10 Kayang | 6 | Titi Tok Bandar, Bangsal Lebah, Temak, Seriab, Gunong Utan Aji, Hujung Batu |
| P.003 Arau | N.11 Pauh | 6 | Guar Gajah, Padang Siding, Pauh, Istana, Pekan Arau, Kubang Paya |
| P.003 Arau | N.12 Tambun Tulang | 6 | Kubang Gajah, Jejawi, Kampong Banat, Kampong Surau, Mengkuang Layar, Tambun Tulang |
| P.003 Arau | N.13 Guar Sanji | 6 | Guar Sanji, Kampong Sena, Behor Mentalon, Chemumar, Serdang, Changkat Jawi |
| P.003 Arau | N.14 Simpang Empat | 5 | Sungai Berembang, Behor Mali, Sungai Bharu, Simpang Empat Che Kasim, Lat Seribu |
| P.003 Arau | N.15 Sanglang | 7 | Bongor Kudong, Bunga Mas, Sungai Padang, Simpang Sanglang, Padang Keria, Kuala Sanglang, Tok Pulau |

== Kedah ==
| Federal constituency | State constituency | Polling districts | |
|---|---|---|---|
| P.004 Langkawi | N.01 Ayer Hangat | 13 | Kuala Teriang, Ewa, Padang Lalang, Kilim, Ladang Sungai Raya, Wang Tok Rendong, Ulu Melaka, Nyior Chabang, Padang Kandang, Padang Matsirat, Kampung Atas, Bukit Kemboja, Makam Mahsuri |
| P.004 Langkawi | N.02 Kuah | 14 | Kampung Gelam, Kedawang, Pantai Chenang, Temonyong, Kampung Bayas, Sungai Menghulu, Kelibang, Dundong, Pulau Dayang Bunting, Lubok Chempedak, Kampung Tuba, Kuah, Kampung Bukit Malut, Bendang Baru |
| P.005 Jerlun | N.03 Kota Siputeh | 17 | Kampung Bahagia, Kampung Pering, Kampung Kandis, Pekan Kodiang, Kampung Kodiang, Kampung Siputeh, Megat Dewa, Bukit Hantu, Mesjid Paya, Batu 4 Jalan Sanglang, Manggol, Tok Kepak, Sungai Korok, Batas Bengkok, Kampung Sanglang, Kerpan, Kuala Sanglang |
| P.005 Jerlun | N.04 Ayer Hitam | 18 | Padang Sera, Kampung Melele, Kampung Putat, Kampung Imam, Telaga Batu, Padang Perahu, Kampung Pida, Kampung Gurindam, Alor Biak, Kubang Sepat, Lana Bulu, Permatang Paku, Matang Bonglai, Jerlun, Lubok Pinang, Pekan Ayer Hitam, Kampung Gandai, Kubang Nipah |
| P.006 Kubang Pasu | N.05 Bukit Kayu Hitam | 22 | Bukit Kayu Hitam, FELDA Bukit Tangga, Temin, FELDA Laka Selatan, FELDA Batu Lapan, Pekan Baru Changlun, Pekan Lama Changlun, Sintok, Kampung Darat, Kubang Pasu, Guar Napai, Husba, Kampung Napoh, Binjal, Kampung Bemban, Pulau Pisang, Pekan Tunjang, Pulau Timbol, Padang Limau, Pulau Nyior, Kampung Pulau Ketam, Gelong Rambai |
| P.006 Kubang Pasu | N.06 Jitra | 22 | Paya Kemunting, Kampung Kuluang, Malau, Padang Panjang, Wang Tepus, Taman Jitra Jaya, Taman Rasa Sayang, Taman Pasu, Kampung Telok Nibong, Kampung Batu 13, Taman Jitra, Pantai Halban, Kampung Tok Kesop, Tanah Merah, Kampung Telok Malik, Kampung Naga, Lubuk Kawah, Taman Mahsuri, Alor Rambai, Lubok Batu, Bukit Tinggi, Kepala Batas |
| P.007 Padang Terap | N.07 Kuala Nerang | 17 | Padang Sanai, Kubang Palas, Gula Padang Terap, Padang Nyior, Kampung Pisang, Kampung Tanjong, Tualak, Belimbing, Kampung Bendang, Perik, Kurong Hitam, Pekan Kuala Nerang, Rambutan, Kampung Nai Teh, Bukit Tembaga, Kampung Barokhas, Nako Nambua |
| P.007 Padang Terap | N.08 Pedu | 14 | Kuala Tekai, Kampung Musa, Pedu, Tong Pelu, Kampung Mesjid, Belukar Luas, Kubang Bemban, Tandop Besar, Naka, Lamdin, Nami, FELDA Lubok Merbau A, FELDA Lubok Merbau B, Kampung Mahawangsa Padang Terap |
| P.008 Pokok Sena | N.09 Bukit Lada | 22 | Kedundong, Derang, Kampung Kejal, Gajah Mati, Bukit Larek, Pekan Bahru Pokok Sena, Pekan Lama Pokok Sena, Kampung Kolon, Jabi, Telaga Mas, Tanjong Musang, Kebun 500, Kepala Bendang, Kampung Menerong, Kampung Padang, Kampung Paya, Kampung Nawa, Bukit Payong, Kubang Leret, Kampung Bukit, Kuala Lanjut, Kampung Panchor |
| P.008 Pokok Sena | N.10 Bukit Pinang | 16 | Paya Lengkuas, Bukit Pinang, Titi Baru, Kubang Lintah, Hutan Kampung, Taman Bayu, Kampung Bohor, Lepai, Kampung Sungai Mati, Limbong, Kampung Alor Setol, Pondok Langgar, Kampung Langgar B, Telok Jamat, Alor Senibong, Tualang |
| P.008 Pokok Sena | N.11 Derga | 14 | Taman PKNK, Alor Malai, Kampung Telok Sena, Jalan Stadium, Sentosa, Jalan Ambar, Derga, Jalan Sheriff, Alor Segamat, Taman Mewah, Taman Nuri, Taman Intan, Tanjung Seri, Taman Derga Jaya |
| P.009 Alor Setar | N.12 Suka Menanti | 15 | Taman Malaysia, Taman Golf, Taman Uda, Jalan Sultanah, Alor Semadom, Seberang Pumpong, Suka Menanti, Taman Wira, Gunong Sali, Kampung Berjaya, Telok Yan, Kampung Seberang Terus, Taman Rakyat Mergong, Kampung Batin, Alor Merah |
| P.009 Alor Setar | N.13 Kota Darul Aman | 22 | Jalan Lumpur, Kampung Perak, Seberang Nyonya, Jalan Raja, Jalan Kolam, Pengkalan, Jalan Seberang Perak, Taman Bahagia, Kota Tanah, Kampung Piew, Jalan Pegawai, Sungai Korok, Kampung Telok, Bandar Simpang Kuala, Rumah Pangsa Simpang Kuala, Kampung Pegawai, Kanchut, Tambang Badak, Bakar Bata, Jalan Stesyen, Taman Bee Bee, Tongkang Yard |
| P.009 Alor Setar | N.14 Alor Mengkudu | 15 | Kampung Gelam, Alor Melintang, Titi Haji Idris, Tok Sibil, Alor Binjal, Tok Keling, Lahar Budi, Alor Mengkudu, Taman Saga, Taman Sultan Abdul Halim, Jalan Langgar, Kampung Tanjong Bendahara, Keriang Pulau, Selarong, Tandop |
| P.010 Kuala Kedah | N.15 Anak Bukit | 18 | Titi Gajah, Alor Ganu, Alor Madi, Kota Rentang, Permatang Kong, Kubang Raja, Padang Hang, Padang Lalang, Gunong, Kubang Tedoh, Taman Aman, Pekan Anak Bukit, Kampung Anak Bukit, Pantai Johor, Chegar, Alor Melintang, Sungai Baru, Mergong |
| P.010 Kuala Kedah | N.16 Kubang Rotan | 17 | Kuar Jawa, Kubang Jawi, Kubang Jambu, Kubang Rotan, Seberang Kota, Kampung Bahru, Pekan Kuala Kedah, Taman Sri Putra, Kampung Tengah, Kampung Balai, Kubang Panggas, Telok Chengai, Taman Seri Ampang, Taman Pelangi, Peremba, Taman Sultan Badlishah, Taman Malek |
| P.010 Kuala Kedah | N.17 Pengkalan Kundor | 17 | Telok Kechai, Taman Sophia, Taman Bersatu, Telok Bagan, Kebun Pinang, Tebengau, Kampung Benua, Simpang Empat, Selarong Panjang, Permatang Ibus, Kuala Sala, Sala Kechil, Selarong Batang, Buloh Lima, Taman Impian, Kota Sarang Semut, Taman Cengkeh |
| P.011 Pendang | N.18 Tokai | 21 | Sri Pudak, Kepala Bukit, Kampung Penyarom, Tanah Merah, Kampung Rambai, Kubang Jelai, Pekan Tokai, Kampung Pulai, Alor Besar, Kobah, Tempoyak, Sebrang Pendang, Pekan Pendang, Bukit Raya, Banggol Besi, Guar Kepayang, Cherok Kudong, Gajah Mati, Manggol Petai, Paya Kelubi, Batu Manunggul |
| P.011 Pendang | N.19 Sungai Tiang | 23 | Kubor Panjang, Kampung Perupok, Kampung China, Padang Durian, Pokok Assam, Kampung Belat, Paya Rawa, Kampung Bechah, Titi Akar, Sungai Tiang Blok B, Sungai Tiang Blok A, Kampung Mahawangsa Pendang, Kampung Bahru, Sawa Kechil, Padang Pusing, Ayer Puteh, Bukit Jambol, Junun, Tanjong Setol, Bukit Genting, Pokok Tai, Paya Mak Inson, Paya Mengkuang |
| P.012 Jerai | N.20 Sungai Limau | 19 | Matang Buloh, Sungai Dedap, Gelam Tiga, Bukit Choras, Bukit Besar, Simpang Tiga Luar, Simpang Tiga, Selengkoh, Sungai Daun, Sungai Limau, Kabu Sepuloh, Sungai Kering, Sedaka, Ulu Sedaka, Padang Lumat, Batu Enam Belas, Kampung Titi Batu, Dulang Kechil, Dulang Besar |
| P.012 Jerai | N.21 Guar Chempedak | 16 | Pondok Haji Majid, Taman Sri Wangsa, Pondok Haji Hussein, Titi Teras, Teroi, Titi Serong, Kuala Yan Kechil, Pekan Sungai Yan, Sungai Udang, Singkir Darat, Kampung Acheh, Lubok Buoy, Pekan Yan, Sungai Raga, Ruat, Singkir Laut |
| P.012 Jerai | N.22 Gurun | 18 | Pekan Jeniang, Kampung Jeniang, Batu Sepuloh, Batu 9, Padang Lembu, Sungai Rotan, Gurun, Pulau Chengai, Bongkok Gurun, Pekan Gurun, Pekan Baru Gurun, Kampung Gurun, Taman Seri Jerai, Ladang Jerai, Sungai Puntar, Sungai Tok Pawang, Kampung Mesjid, Pekan Bahru Bedong |
| P.013 Sik | N.23 Belantek | 14 | Kota Aur, Belantek, Kampung Gulau, Kubang Kesom, Chepir, Kampung Chong, Bendang Man, Durian Burong, Charok Kit, Kampung Dusun, Pekan Sik, Kampung Sadu, Kampung Namek, Kampung Kemelong |
| P.013 Sik | N.24 Jeneri | 16 | Padang Chichak, Kampung Betong, Kota Bukit, Kuala Jeneri, Kampung Kalai, Kampung Kuala Bigia, Kampung Chemara, Kampung Bigia, Kampung Telui, Batu Lima, Charok Padang, Hujong Bandar, Kampung Bandar, Tupai, FELDA Telui Timor, Beris Jaya |
| P.014 Merbok | N.25 Bukit Selambau | 21 | Kuala Sin, Kampung Sungkap, Bukit Lembu, Taman Bandar Baru, Sungai Lalang, Taman Desa Aman, Bandar Laguna Merbok, Tasek Apong, Air Menideh, Jalan Badlishah, Taman Peruda, Taman Ria Utara, United Petani, Petani Para, Bukit Rusa, Pekan Bukit Selambau, Kampung Pokok Machang, Batu Belachan, Titi Panjang, Ambangan Height, Taman Ria Selatan |
| P.014 Merbok | N.26 Tanjong Dawai | 19 | Bujang, Pekan Sabtu Merbok, Simpang Tiga Pasir, Pekan Merbok, Kampung Pasir, Kampung Huma, Tanjong Dawai, Batu Hampar, Pengkalan Bujang, Sungai Gelam, Sungai Jagong, Sungai Layar, Semeling Kanan, Semeling Kiri, Kampung Bedong, Taman Orkid, Taman Sri Tanjong, Bunga Raya, Sekolah Ibrahim |
| P.015 Sungai Petani | N.27 Pantai Merdeka | 19 | Bukit Kechik, Bukit Meriam, Sintok Bugis, Padang Salim, Kuala Muda, Haji Kudong, Kota Kuala Muda, Sungai Mas, Rantau Panjang, Pekan Tikam Batu, Kampung Simpor, Batu Lintang, Simpor Timor, Telok Wang, Kampung Berapit, Kampung Tikam Batu, Pekula, Padang Temusu, Pinang Tunggal |
| P.015 Sungai Petani | N.28 Bakar Arang | 18 | Taman Dahlia, Jalan Pengkalan, Kolam Air, Bandar, Simpang Tiga Pekan Lama, Peteri, Kampung Bahru, Taman Sentosa, Taman Delima, Taman Intan, Bakar Arang, Taman Arked, Taman Makmur, Sungai Pasir, Taman Nilam, Taman Sejati Indah, Taman Sri Wang, Taman Keladi |
| P.015 Sungai Petani | N.29 Sidam | 13 | Taman Mutiara, Pekan Lama, Padang Buloh, Kampung Sidam, Kampung Raja, Scarboro, Pengkalan Lebai Man, Taman Sutera, Seri Impian, Puteri Jaya, Kampung Sarukam, Pantai Prai, Taman Ria Jaya |
| P.016 Baling | N.30 Bayu | 28 | Kampung Batu Lapan, Tanjong Pari, Kampung Weng, Kampung Surau, Kampung Legong, Kampung Lalang, Kampung Luar, Kampung Bandar, Tandop, Bongor Mesjid, Bongor Sekolah, Kampung Haji Abbas, Rambong Baling, Batu 7 Jalan Kroh, Simpang Empat, Pekan Baling, Bukit Baling, Sebrang Baling, Dalam Wang, Pekan Pulai, Pokok Sena, Telok Teduri, Sera Mesjid, Telok Sera, Kampung Tiak, Bendang Padang, Kuala Kuang, Kampung Iboi |
| P.016 Baling | N.31 Kupang | 26 | Charok Salang, Kampung Asam Jawa, Charok Kelian, Sungai Limau, Charok Bemban, Gua Reban, Kampung Padang, Lanai, Mengkuang, Lubok Kabu, Kuala Pegang, Kampung Raja Kampung Landak, Pekan Kupang, Kuala Chenerai, Ketemba, Kampung Sadek, Bukit Terabak, Simpang Jerai, Kampung Tanjong, Ladang Sungai Tawar, Badenoch, Ulu Bakai, Pekan Malau, Badang, Kampung Sidim |
| P.016 Baling | N.32 Kuala Ketil | 24 | FELDA Teloi Kanan, Kampung Guar Chempedak, Padang Kulim, Pekan Baru Kuala Ketil, Pekan Lama Kuala Ketil, Taman Batu Pekaka, Batu Pekaka, Kampung Thye Seng, Kuala Kuli, Kampung Jawa, Padang Geh, Kuala Merah, Parit Panjang, Kampung Tembak, Paya Besar, Kuala Samak, Binjol Dalam, Kampung Tawar, Pekan Tawar, Binjal Luar, Ladang Malakoff, Kejai, Kampung Bakai, Pelam |
| P.017 Padang Serai | N.33 Merbau Pulas | 21 | Guar Lobak, Sidam Kanan, Kuala Sedim, Pekan Merbau Pulas, Kampung Jemerli, Bagan Sena, Sungai Karangan, Padang Meiha, Ladang Padang Meiha, Batu Puteh, Bukit Sedim, Kampung Bikan, Kampung Jangkang, Sungai Kob, Kampung Sungai Ular, Kulim High Tech, Padang China, Taman Perak, Taman Senangin, Kampung Baru, Jalan Serdang |
| P.017 Padang Serai | N.34 Lunas | 22 | Henrietta, Victoria, Naga Lilit, Sungai Seluang, Batu Enam, Kampung Baru Lunas, Pekan Lunas, Taman Sejahtera, Paya Besar, Taman Lobak, Sungai Limau, Kampung Keladi, Taman Selasih, Simpang Tiga Keladi, Kampung Dusun, Kelang Sago, Bandar Putra, Taman Angsana, Taman Semarak, Pekan Padang Serai, Jalan Baling, Jalan Lunas |
| P.018 Kulim-Bandar Baharu | N.35 Kulim | 23 | Kampung Tebuan, Ulu Mahang, Pekan Mahang, Ladang Sungai Dingin, FELDA Gunong Bongsu, Karangan, Terap, Ladang Sungai Ular, Ladang Anak Kulim, Jalan Tunku Bendahara, Taman Kenari, Taman Tunku Putra, Taman Seri Kulim, Pekan Kulim, Jalan Tunku Putra, Jalan Ibrahim, Bukit Awi, Taman Bersatu, Ayer Merah, Taman Anggerik, Junjong, Padang Penyangga, Durian Burong |
| P.018 Kulim-Bandar Baharu | N.36 Bandar Baharu | 18 | Sungai Batu, Sungai Taka, Sungai Tengas, Selama, Batu Lintang, Kampung Ee Guan, Pekan Serdang, Batu 16, Relau, Sungai Kechil Illir, Ayer Puteh, Telok Sera, Pekan Lubok Buntar, Kerat Telunjok, Sungai Kechil Ulu, Parit Nibong, Permatang Pasir, Bandar Baharu |

== Kelantan ==
| Federal constituency | State constituency | Polling districts | |
|---|---|---|---|
| P.019 Tumpat | N.01 Pengkalan Kubor | 12 | Pengkalan Kubor, Kampung Ketil, Kampung Tebing, Kampung Geting, Simpangan, Tujoh, Telaga Bata, Bunohan, Jubakar Darat, Kampung Bendang Pak Yong, Kampung Telok Jering, Kedai Geting |
| P.019 Tumpat | N.02 Kelaboran | 14 | Jubakar Pantai, Dalam Rhu, Bandar Tumpat, Tanjong Kuala, Kampung Besut, Kampung Kelong, Kampung Berangan, Kampung Padang Tembesu, Terbak, Kelaboran, Pulau Beluru, Mak Neralang, Sungai Pinang, Kok Keli |
| P.019 Tumpat | N.03 Pasir Pekan | 12 | Kampung Bendang Pulau, Kampung Laut, Kok Pasir, Morak, Palekbang, Pasir Pekan Hilir, Paloh, Pasir Pekan, Kampung Bharu Sungai, Kutan, Alor Pasir, Kampung Dalam Kota Kubang Labu |
| P.019 Tumpat | N.04 Wakaf Bharu | 14 | Kampung Pasir Puteh, Cherang Melintang, Kampung Tok Oh, Kampung Periok, Bunut Sarang Burong, Kebakat, Chenderong Batu, Kampung Kubang Batang, Chabang Empat, Kampung Jal Besar, Jal Kechil, Wakaf Delima, Kampung Belukar, Wakaf Bharu Kedai |
| P.020 Pengkalan Chepa | N.05 Kijang | 9 | Pulau Pisang, Pulau Kundor, Semut Api, Kedai Buloh, Kijang, Banggol, Tikat, Kampung Penambang, Kampung China |
| P.020 Pengkalan Chepa | N.06 Chempaka | 11 | Sabak, Tebing Tinggi, Telok Kitang, Kampung Pulau Panjang, Tanjong Baharu, Che Deris, Baung, Pengkalan Nangka, Chempaka, Simpang Tiga Pengkalan Chepa, Pulau Gajah |
| P.020 Pengkalan Chepa | N.07 Panchor | 12 | Taman Kemumin, Tapang, Kemumin, Panchor, Sering, Pasir Kasar, Pulau Belanga, Tok Ku, Kampung Belukar, Padang Tembak, Panji, Pasir Tok Kambing |
| P.021 Kota Bharu | N.08 Tanjong Mas | 10 | Wakaf Mek Zainab, Tanjong Chat, Sungai Keladi, Kok Pasir, Khatib Ali, Tanjong Mas, Cherang, Kampung Bayam, Langgar, Paya Bemban |
| P.021 Kota Bharu | N.09 Kota Lama | 12 | Kubang Pasu, Kelochor, Kebun Sultan, Merbau, Atas Banggol, Jalan Pejabat Pos Lama, Bandar, Padang Garong, Kota Lama, Islah Lama, Kampung Dusun, Kubor Kuda |
| P.021 Kota Bharu | N.10 Bunut Payong | 11 | Kg Sireh Bawah Lembah, Wakaf Siku, Jalan Raja Dewa, Telipot, Kampung Belukar, Bunut Payong Hilir, Pintu Geng, Kota Utara, Lundang, Bunut Payong, Kampung Wakaf Che Yeh |
| P.022 Pasir Mas | N.11 Tendong | 14 | Pangkal Kala, Bechah Semak, Teliar, Bechah Menerong, Bunut Susu, Bechah Durian, Padang Embon, Kampung Paloh, Hutan Chengal, Kubang Sepat, Kampung Hutan Pasir, Tendong, Kedondong, Kampung Chat |
| P.022 Pasir Mas | N.12 Pengkalan Pasir | 9 | Sakar, Kubang Badak, Kubang Bemban, Kampung Bharu, Kampung Dangar, Pengkalan Pasir, Bandar Pasir Mas, Slow Machang, Kasa |
| P.022 Pasir Mas | N.13 Meranti | 12 | Banggol Chicha, Meranti, Bakong, Meranti Kechil, Pohon Buloh, Kampung Lalang, Pohon Tanjong, Kampung Siram, Jejawi, Banggol Setol, Tok Sangkut, Tasek Berangan |
| P.023 Rantau Panjang | N.14 Chetok | 13 | Tanjong Redang, Lemal, Kelar, Kangkong, Binjal, Chetok, Gelam, Rasal, Galok, Bendang Pauh, Jabo, Bechah Kelubi, Kubang Gendang |
| P.023 Rantau Panjang | N.15 Gual Periok | 12 | Lubok Gong, Kedai Gual Periok, Gual Sitok, Pekan Rantau Panjang, Kedai Lama, Banggol Kulim, Bakat, Kubang Kual, Bukit Tandak, Kuala Itek, Lubok Setol, Kampung Rahmat |
| P.023 Rantau Panjang | N.16 Apam Putra | 13 | Lubok Tapah, Nibong, Pengkalan Machang, Kampung Bujok, Repek, Lati, Chicha Tinggi, Cherang Hangus, Taman, Batu Karang, Bukit Tuku, Baroh Pial, Chandan |
| P.024 Kubang Kerian | N.17 Salor | 16 | Wakaf Zain, Kota Selatan, Pendek, Larak, Mulong, Telok Kandis, Salor, Kampung Kubang Rawa, Seberang Pasir Mas, Pengkalan Kubor, Dewan, Beta Hilir, Lubok Jambu, Kampung Kor, Beta Hulu, Kedai Piah |
| P.024 Kubang Kerian | N.18 Pasir Tumboh | 12 | Padang Enggang, Pasir Hor, Tiong, Tunjong, Kampung Parit, Pasir Tumboh, Kampung Terusan, Guntong, Lating, Nilam Baru, Gong Dermin, Kampung Padang |
| P.024 Kubang Kerian | N.19 Demit | 12 | Demit, Wakaf Tanjong, Mentuan, Kenali, Pulong, Kampung Chicha, Kampung Wakaf Stan, Binjai, Lubok Pukol, Banggu, Mentera, Huda |
| P.025 Bachok | N.20 Tawang | 16 | Senak, Wakaf Aik, Tawang, Beris Gajah Mati, Anak Tembesu, Kampung Tok Jawa, Telok Mesira, Pauh Sembilan, Tok Belian, Tanjong Jering, Beris, Tanjong Pauh, Chap, Bukit Marak, Paya Teratai, Bekelam |
| P.025 Bachok | N.21 Pantai Irama | 16 | Kubang Golok, Perupok, Kampung Sungai, Pantai Damat, Kampung Kemudi, Kampung Nipah, Pantai Irama, Padang China, Kuau, Badak, Melawi, Kampung Sungai Dua, Tangok, Rusa, Telong, Kandis |
| P.025 Bachok | N.22 Jelawat | 18 | Kampung Redang, Beris Lalang, Jelawat Tengah, Kampung Bator, Kuchelong, Kedai Pauh Lima, Teratak Pulai, Seneng, Telaga Ara, Keting, Gunong, Alor Bakat, Mahligai, Pak Badol, Serdang, Kolam, Kubang Telaga, Kampung Bakong |
| P.026 Ketereh | N.23 Melor | 9 | Peringat, Badak Mati, Bechah Keranji, Padang Kala, Padang Raja, Melor, Melor Lama, Tegayong, Pangkal Pisang |
| P.026 Ketereh | N.24 Kadok | 9 | Lachang, Buloh Poh, Berangan, Perol, Kadok, Kampung Talang, Dusun Rendah, Binjal, But Chengal |
| P.026 Ketereh | N.25 Kok Lanas | 11 | Kampung Gondang, Padang Tengah, Ketereh, Padang Lembek, Hutan Pasir, Kampung Guntong, Pangkal Kalong, Kedai Kok Lanas, Setek, Kampung Batu Tinggi, Kampung Sokor |
| P.027 Tanah Merah | N.26 Bukit Panau | 13 | Bukit Panau, Kampung Paloh, Kampung Belimbing, Padang Siam, Kelewek, Kampung Sat, Banggol, Pondok, Tanah Merah Pekan, Tepi Sungai, Batu Hitam, Banggol Kemunting, Manal |
| P.027 Tanah Merah | N.27 Gual Ipoh | 13 | Kuala Paku, Bechah Laut, Pekan Gual Ipoh, Ulu Kusial, Bukit Durian, Terasil, Tebing Tinggi, Kongsi Lima, Kerilla, Kuala Tiga, Blok Sokor, Kg Peralla, Tok Che Dol |
| P.027 Tanah Merah | N.28 Kemahang | 7 | FELDA Kemahang 1, FELDA Kemahang 3, FELDA Kemahang 2, Bukit Mas, Bukit Gading, Bendang Nyior, Batang Merbau |
| P.028 Pasir Puteh | N.29 Selising | 13 | Kedai Menanti, Danan, Bukit Merbau, Tualang, Tasik Pauh, Selising, Padang Pak Omar, Banir Belikong, Bukit Abal, Berangan, Alor Geliong, Bukit Bidang, Kampung Seligi |
| P.028 Pasir Puteh | N.30 Limbongan | 13 | Jelor, Kampung Nara, Kampung Merkang, Padang Pak Amat, Panggong, Permatang Sungkai, Cherang Tuli, Saring, Alor Pasir, Gong Serapat, Bandar Pasir Puteh, Dalam Kemunting, Kampung Raja |
| P.028 Pasir Puteh | N.31 Semerak | 10 | Tok Bali, Kampung Lembah, Gong Kulim, Bukit Tanah, Gong Manok, Pekan Cherang Ruku, Dalam Rhu, Gong Tapang, Pulau Lima, Sungai Petai |
| P.028 Pasir Puteh | N.32 Gaal | 12 | Temila, Jeram, Telipok, Telosan, Gong Garu, Batu Hitam, Gaal, Gong Datok, Kandis, Bukit Yong, Gong Nangka, Bukit Awang |
| P.029 Machang | N.33 Pulai Chondong | 12 | Kampung Bandar, Alor Melaka, Merbau Chondong, Kedai Pulai Chondong, Pangkal Gong, Kerawang, Bagan, Kampung Tok Bok, Joh, Labok, Kampung Binjai, Dewan |
| P.029 Machang | N.34 Temangan | 11 | Simpul Berlubang, Kelaweh, Pak Roman, Pangkal Meleret, Paloh Rawa, Batu 30, Kampung Raja, Kampung Pauh, Bandar Temangan, Kampung Kerilla, Pangkal Chuit |
| P.029 Machang | N.35 Kemuning | 13 | Sungai Hala, Kweng Hitam, Pangkal Changgong, Bandar Lama, Bandar Bharu, Bukit Tiu, Ulu Sat, Banggol Judah, Bakar, Kemuning, Cherang Hangus, Kampung Pek, Kampung Bunut |
| P.030 Jeli | N.36 Bukit Bunga | 10 | Bukit Bunga, Jakar, Nibong, Jedok Tua, Lalang Pepuyu, Batu Gajah, Asahan, Lawang, Gual Jedok, Air Canal |
| P.030 Jeli | N.37 Air Lanas | 10 | Kalai, Gunong, Bandar Jeli, Gemang, Air Lanas, Legeh, Sungai Satan, Berdang, Pos Sungai Rual, Kedai Air Lanas |
| P.030 Jeli | N.38 Kuala Balah | 8 | Batu Melintang, Pendok, Sungai Long, Lubok Bongor, Kubor Datu, Jerimbong, Kedai Kuala Balah, Kampung Bharu Tg. Abd. Rahman Putra |
| P.031 Kuala Krai | N.39 Mengkebang | 11 | Pasir Kelang, Kuala Nal, Bukit Sireh, Batu Jong, Keroh, Pasir Gajah, Telekong, Sungai Durian, Chenulang, R.K.T. Mengkebang, R.P.T. Sungai Pas |
| P.031 Kuala Krai | N.40 Guchil | 12 | Ladang Taku, Kampung Bharu Guchil Utara, Sri Guchil, Kampung Bharu Guchil Tengah, Kampung Bharu Guchil Selatan, Bandar Kuala Krai, Kg Hamzah, RKT Bahagia, Tualang, Kenor, Kuala Pahi, Pahi |
| P.031 Kuala Krai | N.41 Manek Urai | 9 | Temalir, Sungai Perial, Manek Urai Lama, Manek Urai Baru, Sungai Sok, Chuchoh Puteri, Lata Rek, Manjor, Laloh |
| P.031 Kuala Krai | N.42 Dabong | 12 | Kandek, Kuala Gris, Dabong, Jelawang, Kemubu, Bintang, Bukit Abu, Temiang, Kampung Sungai Mel, Pemberian, Olak Jeram, Biak |
| P.032 Gua Musang | N.43 Nenggiri | 20 | Tohoi, Pos Simpor, Sungai Puian, Sungai Jenera, Sungai Wias, Jerek, Bertam Baru, Pasir Tumboh, Ladang SEDC, Jeram Tekoh, Sungai Asap, Renok, Kuala Sungai, Bertam Lama, Star, Perasu, Serian, Meranto, KESEDAR Limau Kasturi, Limau Kasturi |
| P.032 Gua Musang | N.44 Paloh | 11 | FELDA Sungai Chiku 3, Pasir Linggi, KESEDAR Paloh, KESEDAR Sungai Chalil, Lebir, KESEDAR Paloh 3, Aring, FELDA Sungai Chiku 1, FELDA Sungai Chiku 7, FELDA Sungai Chiku 2, KESEDAR Paloh 2 |
| P.032 Gua Musang | N.45 Galas | 15 | Sungai Betis, Lojing, Sungai Ber, Belatim, Balar, Bihai, Hau, Kampung Pulai, Kampung Bharu, Bandar Lama Gua Musang, Bandar Baru Gua Musang, Kampung Batu Papan, Lepan Tupai, Sungai Terah, Blau |

== Terengganu ==
| Federal constituency | State constituency | Polling districts | |
|---|---|---|---|
| P.033 Besut | N.01 Kuala Besut | 9 | Pulau Perhentian, Seberang Barat, Nail, Seberang Barat Luar, Tok Saboh, Kampung Nangka, Kampung Baru, Bukit Puteri, Air Terjun |
| P.033 Besut | N.02 Kota Putera | 12 | Pekan Seberang Kastam, Pengkalan Nyireh, Kampung Raja Utara, Kampung Raja Selatan, Keluang, Batu Tumbuh, Amir, Gong Bayur, Tembila, Beting Lintang, Alur Lintang, Gelam Mas |
| P.033 Besut | N.03 Jertih | 13 | Kubang Bemban, Alur Lintah, Tok Raja, Bukit Kenak, Gong Nering, Simpang Tiga Jertih, Bandar Jertih, Seberang Jertih, Padang Luas, Padang Landak, Nyiur Tujuh, Gong Gucil, Pelagat |
| P.033 Besut | N.04 Hulu Besut | 11 | Cerang Meliling, Lubuk Kawah, Alur Keladi, Darau, Pasir Akar, Padang Bual, Bukit Payung, Felda Tenang, Kampung La, Hulu Besut, Kayu Kelat |
| P.034 Setiu | N.05 Jabi | 9 | Kuala Kubang, Apal, Tanah Merah, Kerandang, Jabi, Renek, Tempinis, Bukit Jeruk, Tok Dor |
| P.034 Setiu | N.06 Permaisuri | 16 | Gong Batu, Bintang, Fikri, Mangkuk, Guntung Dalam, Guntung Luar, Kampung Besut, Permaisuri, Putera Jaya, Banggul, Penarik, Bari, Telaga Papan, Merang, Rhu Sepuluh, Saujana |
| P.034 Setiu | N.07 Langkap | 13 | Kampung Rahmat, Gong Terap, Bukit Putera, Chalok Barat, Langkap, Pengkalan Merbau, Sungai Bari, Jelapang, Sungai Tong, Pelung, Kampung Bukit, Bukit Munduk, Chalok Kedai |
| P.034 Setiu | N.08 Batu Rakit | 11 | Pulau Redang, Mengabang Lekar, Darat Batu Rakit, Batu Rakit, Maras, Bukit Wan, Bukit Cempaka, Padang Kemunting, Wakaf Tengah, Mengabang Teliput, Mengabang Telung |
| P.035 Kuala Nerus | N.09 Tepuh | 11 | FELDA Belara, Gemuruh, Bukit Guntung, Tepuh, Padang Air, Tok Jiring, Padang Nanas, Taman Perumahan Gong Badak, Lerek, Gong Datuk, Wakaf Tembesu |
| P.035 Kuala Nerus | N.10 Buluh Gading | 10 | Bukit Petiti, Banggul Peradung, Kebur Besar, Kebur Air, Jeram, Petai Bubus, Teluk Pasu, Tanjung Bunut, Kesum, Buluh Gading |
| P.035 Kuala Nerus | N.11 Seberang Takir | 9 | Tok Jembal, Bukit Tok Beng, Kampung Batin, Kampung Baru Seberang Takir, Seberang Takir Pantai, Teluk Ketapang, Telaga Daing, Telaga Batin, Kubang Badak |
| P.035 Kuala Nerus | N.12 Bukit Tunggal | 7 | Batu Enam, Pak Katak, Bukit Tumbuh, Bukit Tunggal, Duyung, Pulau Ketam, Gong Kijang |
| P.036 Kuala Terengganu | N.13 Wakaf Mempelam | 12 | Pulau Rusa, Paluh, Losong Datok Amar, Losong Penglima Perang, Losong Haji Mat Shafie, Seberang Baruh, Wakaf Beruas, Merbau Patah, Durian Burung, Sungai Rengas, Wakaf Mempelam, Kuala Bekah |
| P.036 Kuala Terengganu | N.14 Bandar | 9 | Tok Ku, Cabang Tiga, Hiliran Masjid, Losong Masjid, Pulau Kambing, Kampung Cina, Banggul, Paya Bunga, Tanjung |
| P.036 Kuala Terengganu | N.15 Ladang | 8 | Ladang, Tekukur, Batas Baru, Gong Kapas, Pasir Panjang, Bukit Bayas, Bukit Besar, Gong Gemia |
| P.036 Kuala Terengganu | N.16 Batu Buruk | 12 | Pantai Batu Buruk, Nibung, Gong Tok Nasek, Bukit Depu, Kuala Ibai, Chendering Pantai, Chendering, Taman Permint Jaya, Mengabang Tengah, Kolam, Kenanga, Tok Adis |
| P.037 Marang | N.17 Alur Limbat | 9 | Pulau Manis, Rawai, Tasik, Banggul Tok Ku, Beladau Selat, Kepung, Padang Midin, Gelugur Kedai, Tebakang |
| P.037 Marang | N.18 Bukit Payung | 10 | Kampung Laut, Atas Tol, Paya Resak, Kedai Buluh, Surau Haji Daud, Undang, Bukit Payung, Pekan Bukit Payung, Mak Kemas, Surau Panjang |
| P.037 Marang | N.19 Ru Rendang | 11 | Rusila, Medan Jaya, Sentul Patah, Kijing, Bandar Marang, Seberang Marang, Bukit Gasing, Batangan, Ru Muda, Pulau Kerengga, Kelulut |
| P.037 Marang | N.20 Pengkalan Berangan | 15 | Sungai Serai, Binjai Rendah, Cerang China, Wakaf Tapai, Jerung Surau, Bukit Parit, Pengkalan Berangan, Kubu, Mercang, Pasir Putih, Jambu Bongkok, Gong Balai, Padang Mengkuang, Durian Guling, Bukit Jejulung |
| P.038 Hulu Terengganu | N.21 Telemung | 16 | Basung, Teris, Kuala Ping, Payang Kayu, Tengkawang, Kuala Telemung, Nibung, Matang, Pauh, Kuala Dura, Dusun, Bukit Gemuruh, Sekayu, Tapah, Ceting, Kuala Jeneris |
| P.038 Hulu Terengganu | N.22 Manir | 7 | Kedai Manir, Beladau Kolam, Durian Emas, Pulau Bahagia, Pujuk, Batu Hampar, Teluk Menara |
| P.038 Hulu Terengganu | N.23 Kuala Berang | 13 | Getang, Pasir Tinggi, Sungai Ular, Tanggul, Bandar Kuala Berang, Bukit Tok Bat, Telaga, Tanjung Putat, Langgar, Kampung Buluh, Tapu, Sungai Petai, Tajin |
| P.038 Hulu Terengganu | N.24 Ajil | 16 | Bukit Perah, Bukit Apit, Tok Randok, Pengkalan Ajal, Bukit Diman, Bukit Bading, Landas, Peruh, Menerung, Lubuk Periuk, Pekan Ajil, FELDA Tersat, FELDA Jerangau Barat, Pereh, Betung, FELDA Mengkawang |
| P.039 Dungun | N.25 Bukit Besi | 12 | FELDA Jerangau, Nerang, Tepus, Dendang, Bukit Besi, Al-Muktafi Billah Shah, Kuala Jengai, Pasir Raja, Shukor, Jongok Batu, Lintang, Minda |
| P.039 Dungun | N.26 Rantau Abang | 12 | Pinang, Padang Pulut, Delung, Kuala Abang, Seberang Pintasan, Pulau Serai, Tok Kah, Che Lijah, Gong Pasir, Serdang, Balai Besar, Taman Permint Indah |
| P.039 Dungun | N.27 Sura | 12 | Sungai Penaga, Sungai Buaya, Nibung, Bukit Catak, Alur Tembesu, Kampung Molek, Tanah Lot, Teluk Lipat, Sura Gate, Sura Utara, Padang Jambu, Sura Tengah |
| P.039 Dungun | N.28 Paka | 13 | Kampung Baru Batu Lima, Durian Mentangau, Kampung Nyiur, Tebing Tembah, Kampung Masjid, Limbung, Cacar, FELDA Kertih 2, FELDA Kertih 1, Santung, FELDA Kertih 4, Cacar Baru, FELDA Kertih 3 |
| P.040 Kemaman | N.29 Kemasik | 11 | Batu Putih, FELDA Kertih 6, Kampung Ranggon, Kuala Kertih, Pekan Kertih, Kemasik, Pekan Air Jernih, FELDA Kertih 5, Chabang, Tok Kaya, Rantau Petronas |
| P.040 Kemaman | N.30 Kijal | 9 | Padang Kubu, Seri Bandi, Ibok, Bukit Anak Dara, Pekan Kijal, Teluk Kalung, Bukit Kuang, Payoh, Beris Meraga |
| P.040 Kemaman | N.31 Cukai | 14 | Bakau Tinggi, Kampung Besut, Kampung Tuan, Gong Limau, Gong Pauh, Kubang Kurus, Banggul, Kampung Tengah, Kuala Kemaman, Geliga, Jakar, Fikri, Paya Berenjut, Geliga Besar |
| P.040 Kemaman | N.32 Air Putih | 14 | Mak Chili, Bukit Mentok, Pasir Minal, Binjai, Pasir Gajah, Seberang Tayur, Dadung, Air Putih, Bandar Cerul, Bandar Baru Cenih, Sungai Pergam, FELDA Neram 1, Hulu Jabur, FELDA Neram 2 |

== Penang ==
| Federal constituency | State constituency | Polling districts | |
|---|---|---|---|
| P.041 Kepala Batas | N.01 Penaga | 9 | Kuala Muda, Pulau Mertajam, Pasir Gebu, Penaga, Kota Aur, Permatang Janggus, Guar Kepah, Permatang Tiga Ringgit, Lahar Kepar |
| P.041 Kepala Batas | N.02 Bertam | 9 | Padang Benggali, Permatang Berah, Permatang Rambai, Permatang Sintok, Permatang Pak Elong, Permatang Bertam, Kepala Batas, Jalan Kedah, Pongsu Seribu |
| P.041 Kepala Batas | N.03 Pinang Tunggal | 11 | Bumbung Lima, Paya Keladi, Bertam Indah, Ladang Malakoff, Kampong To’Bedu, Permatang Langsat, Pinang Tunggal, Kampong Baharu, Kampong Selamat Utara, Kubang Menerong, Kampong Selamat Selatan |
| P.042 Tasek Gelugor | N.04 Permatang Berangan | 10 | Ara Rendang, Pokok Machang, Pokok Tampang, Permatang Berangan, Simpang Tiga, Tasek Gelugor, Jarak, Padang Chempedak, Ara Kuda, Permatang Kerai |
| P.042 Tasek Gelugor | N.05 Sungai Dua | 9 | Pajak Song, Simpang Ampat, Permatang To’Jaya, Alor Merah, Kampong Telok, Taman Desa Murni, Sungai Dua, Kampong Setol, Lahar Yooi |
| P.042 Tasek Gelugor | N.06 Telok Ayer Tawar | 8 | Telok Ayer Tawar, Permatang Binjai, Pekan Darat, Taman Senangan, Mata Kuching, Jalan Masjid, Taman Wira, Taman Perkasa |
| P.043 Bagan | N.07 Sungai Puyu | 8 | Bagan Ajam, Permatang Tengah, Sungai Puyu, Kampong Bahru, Bagan Lalang, Taman Merbau, Taman Dedap, Taman Bunga Tanjung |
| P.043 Bagan | N.08 Bagan Jermal | 9 | Bagan Jermal, Kubang Buaya, Kampong Gajah, Jalan Mengkuang, Kampong Simpa, Mak Mandin, Taman Sukaria, Taman Melor, Taman Cantik |
| P.043 Bagan | N.09 Bagan Dalam | 7 | Bagan Luar, Telaga Ayer, Taman Bagan, Kampong Acham, Sekolah St. Marks, Bagan Dalam, Jalan Assumption |
| P.044 Permatang Pauh | N.10 Seberang Jaya | 9 | Jalan Sembilang, Seberang Jaya II, Kampong Pertama, Kampong Belah Dua, Seberang Jaya I, Jalan Bahru, Simpang Ampat, Jalan Tuna, Taman Tun Hussien Onn |
| P.044 Permatang Pauh | N.11 Permatang Pasir | 9 | Sama Gagah, Permatang Ara, Permatang Pauh, Bukit Indra Muda, Kampong Pelet, Kubang Semang, Tanah Liat Mukim 8, Kampong Cross Street 2, Permatang Tengah |
| P.044 Permatang Pauh | N.12 Penanti | 10 | Guar Perahu, Kuala Mengkuang, Telok Wang, Mengkuang, Sungai Lembu, Penanti, Kubang Ulu, Sungai Semambu, Tanah Liat Mukim 9, Berapit Road |
| P.045 Bukit Mertajam | N.13 Berapit | 8 | Kampong Aston, Bukit Noning, Taman Bukit Ria, Kampong Bahru, Jalan Berjaya, Taman Alma, Mutiara Indah, Taman Tenang |
| P.045 Bukit Mertajam | N.14 Machang Bubuk | 11 | To’ Kun, Machang Bubok, Bukit Teh, Alma, Taman Seri Kijang, Bukit Minyak, Permatang Tinggi, Gajah Mati, Taman Jambu, Taman Seri Janggus, Taman Alma Jaya |
| P.045 Bukit Mertajam | N.15 Padang Lalang | 7 | Kampong Cross Street 1, Station Road, High School, Bukit Kechil, Desa Damai, Taman Keenways, Taman Binjai |
| P.046 Batu Kawan | N.16 Perai | 6 | Taman Indrawasih, Taman Chai Leng, Perai, Taman Perai, Taman Supreme, Taman Kimsar |
| P.046 Batu Kawan | N.17 Bukit Tengah | 9 | Kampong Jawa, Jalan Pengkalan, Kebun Sireh, Bukit Tengah, Kuala Juru, Juru, Taman Perwira, Taman Sejati, Taman Sentul Jaya |
| P.046 Batu Kawan | N.18 Bukit Tambun | 9 | Pulau Aman, Batu Kawan, Bukit Tambun, Taman Merak, Kampong Baharu, Ladang Valdor, Perkampungan Valdor, Badak Mati, Rumah Murah Valdor |
| P.047 Nibong Tebal | N.19 Jawi | 10 | Changkat, Perkampungan Jawi, Taman Desa Jawi, Ladang Caledonia, Ladang Byram, Ladang Victoria, Taman Sentosa, Nibong Tebal, Jalan Bukit Panchor, Taman Helang Jaya |
| P.047 Nibong Tebal | N.20 Sungai Bakap | 8 | Padang Lalang, Puteri Gunong, Tasek Junjong, Sungai Duri, Sungai Bakap, Ladang Sempah, Sungai Kechil, Kampung Besar |
| P.047 Nibong Tebal | N.21 Sungai Acheh | 7 | Sungai Udang, Sungai Setar, Sungai Acheh, Sungai Bakau, Tanjong Berembang, Permatang To’ Mahat, Taman Transkrian |
| P.048 Bukit Bendera | N.22 Tanjong Bunga | 7 | Batu Feringgi, Jalan Vale Of Tempe, Kampong Tanjong Bunga, Seaview Park, Jalan Gajah, Tanjong Tokong, Sungai Kelian |
| P.048 Bukit Bendera | N.23 Air Putih | 7 | Bukit Bendera, Stesyen Bawah, Jalan Lintang, Hye Keat Estate, Reservoir Gardens, Race Course, Taman Sempadan |
| P.048 Bukit Bendera | N.24 Kebun Bunga | 8 | Fettes Park, Ladang Hong Seng, Taman Bunga, Quarry Drive, Jalan Batu Gantong, Rumah Pangsa, Rifle Range Road, Rifle Range |
| P.048 Bukit Bendera | N.25 Pulau Tikus | 8 | Pantai Molek, Jalan Punchak Erskine, Taman Gottlieb, College Avenue, Bangkok Lane, Peel Avenue, Ayer Rajah, Barrack Road |
| P.049 Tanjong | N.26 Padang Kota | 14 | Northam Road, Pykett Avenue, Rangoon Road, Nagore Road, Wellesley School, Farquhar Street, Lorong Argus, Muntri Street, Kampong Malabar, Lorong Seck Chuan, Lorong Pasar, Esplanade, Leboh Pasar, Leboh Ah Quee |
| P.049 Tanjong | N.27 Pengkalan Kota | 9 | Leboh Presgrave, Jalan Magazine, Jalan Prangin, Leboh Victoria, Pengkalan Weld, Gat Leboh Noordin, Jalan C.Y. Choy, Macallum Street, Leboh Cecil |
| P.049 Tanjong | N.28 Komtar | 14 | Dickens Street, Leboh Cintra, Kampong Kolam, Leboh Acheh, Leboh Melayu, Hong Kong Street, Komtar, Madras Lane, Jalan Timah, Jalan Lines, Jalan Dato’ Keramat, Irving Road, Jalan Pahang, Jalan Kim Bian Aik |
| P.050 Jelutong | N.29 Datok Keramat | 9 | Jalan York, Sekolah Free, Taman Sekolah Free, Taman Abidin, Jalan Perak, Caunter Hall, City Stadium, Kampong Makam, Jalan Kajang |
| P.050 Jelutong | N.30 Sungai Pinang | 8 | Sungai Pinang Road, City Infirmary, Jalan Trusan, West Jelutong, Bakau Street, East Jelutong, Jalan Madrasah, Bukit Dumbar |
| P.050 Jelutong | N.31 Batu Lancang | 10 | Lilitan Hargreaves, Chemor Lane, Lorong Parit Buntar, Jelutong Road, Panchor Road, Batu Lanchang, Solok Batu Lanchang, Jalan Penaga, Tingkat Jelutong, Desa Green |
| P.051 Bukit Gelugor | N.32 Seri Delima | 7 | Kampong Hijau, Island Park, Lintang Delima, Lorong Delima, Bukit Gelugor, Taman Tun Sardon, Sungai Gelugor |
| P.051 Bukit Gelugor | N.33 Air Itam | 9 | Ayer Itam, Happy Valley, Jalan Kampong Pisang, Kampong Melayu, Jalan Chor Sin Kheng, Thean Teik, Zoo Road, Jalan Shaik Madar, Cheeseman Road |
| P.051 Bukit Gelugor | N.34 Paya Terubong | 11 | Paya Terubong Mukim 14, Sungai Dondang, Paya Terubong Mukim 13, Taman Paya Terubong, Relau, Desa Baiduri, Desa Intan, Semarak Api 1, Jln Semarak Api, Bukit Awana, Terubong Jaya |
| P.052 Bayan Baru | N.35 Batu Uban | 8 | Minden Heights, Universiti Sains, Batu Uban, Sungai Dua, Bukit Jambol, Bukit Gambir, Taman Jubilee, Taman Pekaka |
| P.052 Bayan Baru | N.36 Pantai Jerejak | 7 | Pantai Jerejak, Taman Seri Nibong, Pintasan Bahagia, Jalan Mahsuri, Bandar Bayan Baru, Jalan Tengah, Lebuh Mahsuri |
| P.052 Bayan Baru | N.37 Batu Maung | 10 | Kampong Sungai Ara, Taman Desa Ara, Sungai Tiram, Sungai Kluang, Kampong Naran, Permatang Damar Laut, Batu Maung, Taman Sri Bayan, Taman Bukit Gedung, Teluk Tempoyak |
| P.053 Balik Pulau | N.38 Bayan Lepas | 8 | Taman Sungai Ara, Bayan Lepas, Kampong Seronok, Sungai Batu, Telok Kumbar, Pasir Belanda, Gertak Sanggul, Kampung Masjid |
| P.053 Balik Pulau | N.39 Pulau Betong | 7 | Sungai Kongsi, Pondok Upeh, Balik Pulau, Titi Tras, Sungai Burong, Ginting, Pulau Betong |
| P.053 Balik Pulau | N.40 Telok Bahang | 7 | Telok Awak, Telok Bahang, Sungai Pinang, Pantai Acheh, Kuala Sungai Pinang, Sungai Rusa, Jalan Bahru |

== Perak ==
| Federal constituency | State constituency | Polling districts | |
|---|---|---|---|
| P.054 Gerik | N.01 Pengkalan Hulu | 10 | Kuak Hulu, Ayer Panas, Kuak Luar, Pekan Kroh, Kampong Selarong, Tasek, Klian Intan, Kampong Pahit, Kampong Lalang, Kampong Plang |
| P.054 Gerik | N.02 Temenggor | 12 | Krunei, Pekan Grik Barat, Batu Dua, Pekan Grik Timor, Grik Utara, Kuala Rui, Bersia, Rancangan FELDA Bersia, Kampong Bongor, Sungai Tiang, Banun, Pos Kemar |
| P.055 Lenggong | N.03 Kenering | 18 | Kenering Utara, Tawai, Ulu Kenderong, Padang Kunyit, Kampong Ayer Panas, Kampong Padang, Kampong Ganda, Sungai Dala, Belum Baharu, FELDA Papulut, Lawin, FELDA Lawin Selatan, Kampong Sawa, Ayer Kala, Selat Pagar, Sumpitan, Padang Gerus, Bukit Sapi |
| P.055 Lenggong | N.04 Kota Tampan | 15 | Kampong Gelok, Kampong Lenggong, Kampong Sira, Bukit Raja, Bukit Balai, Kampong Telok Batu, Kampong Temelong, Kampong Chepor, Kampong Luat, Banggol Belimbing, Kota Tampan, Lubok Kawah, Kampong Raban, Kuak, Kampong Beng |
| P.056 Larut | N.05 Selama | 15 | Ulu Selama, Ulu Selama Barat, Banggol Jas, Sungai Rambutan, Sungai Bedarah, Kampong Sungai Seputeh, Kampong Garok, Sungai Bayor, Ulu Mengkuang, Rantau Panjang, Rantau Panjang Utara, Pekan Selama, Selama Utara, Sungai Terap, Bukit Kelian |
| P.056 Larut | N.06 Kubu Gajah | 17 | Sungai Dendang, Kubu Gajah, Tebing Tinggi, Sungai Malau, Ladang Holyrood, Bagan Baharu, FELDA Ijok, Ulu Ijok Timor, Kampong Bendang Luas, Redang Panjang, Pantai Besar, Sungai Ara, Kampong Gudang, Batu Dua Puluh, Jelai, Relang, Kampong Ayer Hitam |
| P.056 Larut | N.07 Batu Kurau | 14 | Ulu Sepetang, Sungai Pulau, Batu Kurau, Changkat Perah, Kampong Repoh, Sungai Akar, Kampong Titi Kasai, Changkat Lobak, Bukit Bertam, Kampong Perak Tengah, Kampong Sempeneh, Kampong Anak Kurau, Changkat Larah, Taman Rakyat |
| P.057 Parit Buntar | N.08 Titi Serong | 15 | Parit Sungai Betul, Sungai Labu, Sungai Megat Aris, Sungai Kota, Kedai Empat, Sungai Star, Kampong Perak, Kampong Kedah, Parit Buntar, Seri Tenggara, Jalan Kedah, Taman Kerian, Titi Serong, Tebok Haji Musa, Parit Tok Ngah |
| P.057 Parit Buntar | N.09 Kuala Kurau | 17 | Tanjong Piandang, Piandang Indah, Parit Sungai Burong, Parit Tok Hin, Sungai Baharu, Batu 14, Coast Road, Jalan Bawah, Parit Abas, Kuala Kurau, Kurau Indah, Simpang Tiga, Siakap Road, Parit Telok Pial, Parit Haji Wahab, Parit Haji Abd. Rahman, Parit Haji Ali |
| P.058 Bagan Serai | N.10 Alor Pongsu | 17 | Simpang Lima, Ladang Tali Ayer, Jalan Baharu, Parit Haji Amin, Kedai Dua, Pandak Puteh, Ladang Chersonese, Ladang Gula, Sungai Dungun, Ladang Lian Seng, Jin Seng, Matang Gerdu, Sungai Bogak, Matang Jelutong, Parit Simpang Lima, Alor Pongsu, Changkat Lobak |
| P.058 Bagan Serai | N.11 Gunong Semanggol | 14 | Batu 6 Bukit Merah, Bukit Merah, Pondok Tanjong Barat, Kampong Selamat, Gunong Semanggol, Kubu Gajah, Kampong Tua, Padang Lalang, Railway Line, Parit Haji Taib, Mesjid Tinggi, Kota Bandung, Bagan Serai, Main Road Bagan Serai |
| P.058 Bagan Serai | N.12 Selinsing | 14 | Jalan Siakap, Kampong Kedah, Kuala Gula, Selinsing, Parit Haji Tahir, Parit Gabis, Telok Medan, Sungai Gedong, Simpang Ampat Semanggol, Parit 3 Selinsing, Jalan Gula, Kampong Dew, Simpang Tiga, Bukit Putus |
| P.059 Bukit Gantang | N.13 Kuala Sepetang | 14 | Kurnia Jaya, Palma, Ayer Puteh, Jebong, Kuala Sapetang, Kampong Menteri, Jalan Mangala, Simpang Halt, Sungai Mati, Sungai Limau, Matang Gelugor, Kampong Jaha, Bendang Siam, Changkat Ibol |
| P.059 Bukit Gantang | N.14 Changkat Jering | 9 | Larut Tin, Kawasan J.K.R, Jalan Simpang, Simpang Lama, Ayer Kuning, Changkat Jering, Jelutong, Bukit Gantang, Kampong Cheh |
| P.059 Bukit Gantang | N.15 Trong | 14 | Kuala Trong, Trong Barat, Kampong Tebok Trong, Temelok, Pasir Hitam Trong, Sungai Tinggi, Sungai Che Rahmat, Permatang Raja, Batu Hampar, Sungai Rotan, Padang Gajah, Ayer Terjun, Trong, Bukit Gantang Selatan |
| P.060 Taiping | N.16 Kamunting | 10 | Sungai Relong, Expo, Kamunting Baru, Kamunting, Kampong Pinang Utara, Kampong Pinang Timor, Kampong Pinang Selatan, Kamunting Road, Bukit Jana, Waterfall Road |
| P.060 Taiping | N.17 Pokok Assam | 16 | Pokok Assam, Kampong Aman, Sekolah, Jalan Raja Muda, Pasar, Sungai Tupai, Simpang Road, Kota Road, Market Street, Theatre Road, Tupai Lane, Tupai, Coronation Road, Birch Village, Eastern Road, Museum |
| P.060 Taiping | N.18 Aulong | 16 | Batu Dua, Assam Kumbang, Barrack Road, Station, Aulong, Aulong Timor, Aulong Tengah, Aulong Barat, Aulong Selatan, Aulong Lama, Kampong Boyan, Taman Sening, Taman Marisa, Kota Lama, Pengkalan Aor, Simpang Baru |
| P.061 Padang Rengas | N.19 Chenderoh | 17 | Jenalik, Empangan Chenderoh, Sauk, Sauk Utara, Kampong Seterus, Bendang Selinsing, Chegar Galah, Kampong Cheh, Kampong Chuar, Kati, Berala, Lubok Chapin, Changkat Jambu, Liman Kati, Beluru, Kampong Jamuan, Kota Lama Kiri |
| P.061 Padang Rengas | N.20 Lubok Merbau | 14 | Kampong Laneh, Kroh Hilir, Padang Rengas, Padang Rengas Utara, Kampong Jaya, Kampong Buaya, Kampong Paya, Kampong Lalang, Padang Assam, Kampong Rambong, Lubok Merbau, Kampong Tanah Merah, Kampong Station, Kampong Basong |
| P.062 Sungai Siput | N.21 Lintang | 26 | Kampong Kandang Hulu, Kampong Batang Kulim, Salak North, Kampong Enggor, Karai Luar, Pekan Karai, Kampong Karai, Kampong Jawang, Changkat Salak, Salak Timor, Kamuning Barat, Kamuning Timor, Kampong Temin, Sungai Pelus, Trosor, Kampong Mor, LKTP Lasah, Lintang, Ladang Elphil, Rancangan Belia Khas Perlop, Chior Lasah, Chenein, Pos Piah, Pos Perwor, Pos Legap, Pos Kuala Mu |
| P.062 Sungai Siput | N.22 Jalong | 12 | Jalong Timor, Jalong Barat, Jalan Lintang, Lintang Road Barat, Kampong Bahagia, Rimba Panjang Utara, Kampong Muhibbah, Simpang Tiga, Main Road, Mahkamah, Sungai Buloh Selatan, Sungai Pelang |
| P.063 Tambun | N.23 Manjoi | 18 | Pekan Chemor, Chemor Indah, Kuala Kuang, Kelabang, Kampong Chepor Dalam, Kampong Ulu Chepor, Meru Raya, Meru, Taman Jati, Kampong Sungai Kati, Kampong Datok Ahmad Said Tambahan 2 Selatan, Kampong Datok Ahmad Said Tambahan 2 Tengah, Tun Terang, Kampong Sungai Tapah, Kampong Seberang Manjoi, Kampong Tengku Hussein, Taman Keledang Jaya, Germuda |
| P.063 Tambun | N.24 Hulu Kinta | 19 | Kanthan, Kuang, Kampong Ulu Chemor, Kampong Chik Zainal, Tanah Hitam, Changkat Kinding, Hospital Bahagia, Tanjong Rambutan, Tanjong Rambutan Utara, Tanjong Rambutan Barat, Kawasan Polis Hutan, Kampung Tersusun Batu 8, Bandar Baru Putra, Pakatan Jaya, Taman Perpaduan, Bandar Baru Sunway, Kampong Tersusun Batu 5, Tambun, Jalan Tambun |
| P.064 Ipoh Timor | N.25 Canning | 12 | Taman Ipoh Timor, Taman Ipoh Selatan, Taman Wah Keong, Simee Barat, Simee Timor, Taman Ipoh, Taman Ipoh Barat, Canning Garden Barat, Canning Garden Timor, Lumba Kuda, Taman Cempaka, Desa Cempaka, |
| P.064 Ipoh Timor | N.26 Tebing Tinggi | 12 | Jalan Dato Maharaja Lela, Jalan Sultan Yusof, Jalan Tun Perak, Sungai Kinta, Tebing Sungai Kinta, Kampong Paloh, Tebing Tinggi, Kuala Pari Hilir, Kampong Seri Kinta, Pengkalan Barat, Pengkalan Gate, Pengkalan Pegoh |
| P.064 Ipoh Timor | N.27 Pasir Pinji | 11 | Jalan Bendahara, Kampar Road, Housing Trust, Pasir Pinji Utara, Pasir Pinji Selatan, Pinji Lane Utara, Pasir Puteh Utara, Pasir Puteh Baru, Pinji Lane Selatan, Pasir Puteh Selatan, Taman Pengkalan Jaya |
| P.065 Ipoh Barat | N.28 Bercham | 8 | Bercham Timor, Kampong Bercham, Dermawan Utara, Bercham Selatan, Tasek Dermawan, Tasek, Kampong Tawas Utara, Kampong Tawas |
| P.065 Ipoh Barat | N.29 Kepayang | 13 | Taman Che Wan, Gurap, Gunong Lang, Kepayang Mesjid, Star Park, Fair Park, Kampong Pisang, Jalan Bijih Timah, Jalan Datuk Onn Jaafar, Waller Court, Green Town, Jalan Raja Ekram, Jalan C.M. Yusof |
| P.065 Ipoh Barat | N.30 Buntong | 9 | Taman Lim, Jalan Tun Abdul Razak, Jalan Silibin, Jalan Klian Intan, Kampong Baru Buntong, Jalan Sungai Pari, Falim, Kampong Kacang Puteh, Desa Rishah |
| P.066 Batu Gajah | N.31 Jelapang | 11 | Jelapang Timor, Jelapang Utara, Jelapang Selatan, Jelapang Barat, Jelapang, Silibin, Taman Pertama, Taman Rishah, Jelapang Tengah, Bukit Kledang, Papan |
| P.066 Batu Gajah | N.32 Menglembu | 11 | Bandar Baru Menglembu, Menglembu Lama, Awana, Menglembu Barat, Menglembu Selatan, Bukit Merah Timor, Bukit Merah Barat, Bukit Merah Tengah, Bukit Merah Barat Daya, Bukit Merah Selatan, Lahat |
| P.066 Batu Gajah | N.33 Tronoh | 12 | Gunong Hijau, Jalan Lahat, Jalan Siputeh, Pekan Pusing, Batu Gajah Utara, Batu Gajah Selatan, Penempatan India, Bemban, Siputeh, Tronoh, Nalla, Kampong Bali |
| P.067 Kuala Kangsar | N.34 Bukit Chandan | 13 | Kampong Talang, Jalan Dato Sagor, Jalan Kangsar, Kampong Pajak Potong, Bukit Resident, Bukit Chandan, Jalan Datoh, Kampong Sayong Lembah, Bendang Kering, Menora, Senggang, Seberang Manong, Bekor |
| P.067 Kuala Kangsar | N.35 Manong | 13 | Taman Bunga Raya, Talang Hulu, Jalan Baharu, Bendang Panjang, Jerlun, Kampong Mesjid, Kampong Ketior, Ulu Kenas, Lempor, Kampong Jeliang, Manong, Kampong Semat, Ulu Piol |
| P.068 Beruas | N.36 Pengkalan Baharu | 20 | Kampong Pintu Gerbang, Dendang, Paya Ara, Bruas, Bruas Timor, Bruas Barat, Ladang Bruas, Ulu Bruas, Panchor, Pengkalan Baharu, Kampong Baharu Sungai Batu, Ladang Huntly, Kampong Kota, Kampong Tengah, Gelong Gajah, Kampong Banjar, Kampong Jering New Village, Jalan Ayer Tawar, Changkat Chermin, Paya Nibong |
| P.068 Beruas | N.37 Pantai Remis | 16 | Pantai Remis, Taman Bintang, Kampong Indah, Kampong Sungai Batu, Ladang Segari, Segari, Changkat Keruing, Ladang Cashwood, Kampong Merbau, Kampong Raja Hitam, Bunga Raya, Taman Sri Ayer Tawar, Ayer Tawar Baharu, Taman Dinding, Ayer Tawar Selatan, Ayer Tawar Tengah |
| P.068 Beruas | N.38 Astaka | 10 | Simpang Lima, Pekan Gurney, Simpang Dua, Astaka, Sitiawan, Taman Pegawai, Kampong China Utara, Kampong China Selatan, Kampong Koh Utara, Kampong Koh Selatan |
| P.069 Parit | N.39 Belanja | 21 | Buloh Akar, Chopin Kiri, Chopin Kanan, Kampong Prah, Kampong Tepus, Tanjong Belanja, Serapoh, Kampong Nyior, Kampong Tua Belanja Kiri, Belanja Kanan, Ladang Glenealy, Parit Utara, Parit Selatan, Belanja Kiri, Pasir Gajah, Tanjong Medan, Kampong Paloh, Kampong Dusun, Kampong Selboh, Kampong Kepala Pulau, Layang-Layang Kanan |
| P.069 Parit | N.40 Bota | 16 | Titi Gantong, Kampong Aji, Kompleks Pertanian, Bota Kiri, Telok Kepayang, Kampong Bakong, Lambor Kiri, Padang Tenggala, Seri Iskandar, Kampong Selat, Bota Kanan, Suak Padi, Padang Changkat, Telok Bakong, Kampong Tua, Lambor Kanan |
| P.070 Kampar | N.41 Malim Nawar | 17 | Malim Nawar Utara, Malim Nawar Tengah, Malim Nawar Lama, Malim Nawar Selatan, Malim Nawar Baharu, Malim Nawar, Kampar Barat, Mambang Diawan Utara, Mambang Diawan Selatan, Mambang Diawan Barat, Kampong Ayer Hitam, Tronoh Mines, Kampong Ayer Papan, Pekan Tanjong Tualang, Sungai Durian, Kampong Timah, Changkat Tin |
| P.070 Kampar | N.42 Keranji | 15 | Kampar Utara, Wah Loong Road, Kampong Aston, Taman Bandar Baru, Jalan Kuala Dipang, Jalan Gopeng, Simpang Lima, Kampong Changkat, Jalan Keranji, Jalan Baharu, Jalan Labu, Wah Loong Tengah, Wah Loong Selatan, Jalan Post Office, Jalan Iskandar |
| P.070 Kampar | N.43 Tulang Sekah | 19 | Ayer Denak, Kampong Batu Tujoh, Ladang Lembah Kinta, Kampong Chenderong, Kampong Ayer Mati, Changkat Tualang, Ladang Kinta Kellas, Ladang Kota Bharu, Kota Bharu, Changkat Bharu, Tualang Sekah, Kuala Dipang, Jeram Selatan, Jeram Timor, Jeram Barat, Kampong Pisang, Gunong Mesah, Sungai Siput Selatan, Kampong Sahum |
| P.071 Gopeng | N.44 Sungai Rapat | 9 | Ara Payong, Kampong Pisang, Sri Jaya, Sri Rahmat, Desa Pelancongan, Desa Pakatan, Rapat Jaya, Sungai Rapat, Sungai Rokam |
| P.071 Gopeng | N.45 Simpang Pulai | 13 | Pekan Razaki, Ampang Baharu, Taman Ampang, Kampong Seri Ampang, Taman Ipoh Jaya, Rapat Setia Baru, Rapat Setia, Gunong Rapat Utara, Gunung Rapat Selatan, Taman Taufik, Kampong Sengat, Taman Bersatu, Simpang Pulai |
| P.071 Gopeng | N.46 Teja | 11 | Pos Raya, Kampong Kepayang, Kampong Tekkah Baharu, Kampong Bharu Kopisan, Lawan Kuda Barat, Lawan Kuda Timor, Lawan Kuda Selatan, Kampong Pulai, Kampong Rawa, Gopeng, Kampong Sungai Itek |
| P.072 Tapah | N.47 Chenderiang | 17 | Kuala Woh, Kampong Kinjang, Pekan Chenderiang, Sungai Chenderiang, Temoh, Pekan Temoh, Kampong Lubok Mas, Temoh Road, Jalan Pahang, Kampong Datoh, Kampong Seberang, Sungai Sengkuang, Bidor Road, Lubok Katak, Kampong Batu Melintang, Bukit Pagar, Tanah Mas |
| P.072 Tapah | N.48 Ayer Kuning | 20 | Temoh Stesyen, Sungai Lesong, Kampong Sungai Kurong, Sungai Keroh, Kampong Batu Mesjid, Kampong Batu Tiga, Banir, Banir Utara, Ayer Kuning, Ayer Kuning Selatan, Tanjong Keramat, Changkat Petai, Tapah Road Timor, Tapah Road Utara, Kampong Raya, Pekan Getah, Kampong Simpang Tiga, Kampong Rahmat, Jeram Mengkuang, Kampong Coldstream |
| P.073 Pasir Salak | N.49 Sungai Manik | 20 | Labu Kubong, Kunci Ayer Empat, Chenderong Balai, Simpang Empat Balai Polis, Kampong SC, Headworks, Parit Satu, Parit 13A Sungai Lampam, Parit 3A Sungai Tunku, Kampong Parit 3D, Permatang, Sungai Manik, Chikus, Degong, Langkap, Langkap Tengah, Langkap Utara, Pelawan Timor, Chui Chak, Kampong SC Air Hitam |
| P.073 Pasir Salak | N.50 Kampong Gajah | 33 | Telok Sareh, Sungai Galah, Chenderong Kelubi, Changkat Pinggan, Kampong Balun Bidai, Kampong Setia, Pulau Tiga, Kampong Pasir Garam, Kampong Paloh Pachat, Tanjong Bidara, Kampong Geronggong, Selat Pulau, Kampong Gajah, Pasir Salak, Pasir Jeneris, Pulau Juar, Kampong Pulau Besar, Kampong Ayer Mati, Bandar, Sungai Buaya, Bukit Cawi Seberang Perak, Bandar Pusat Seberang Perak, Kampong Sejagop, Kota Setia, Kampong Sungai Ranggam, Sungai Jejawi, Ladang Seberang, Kampong Sungai Durian, Ladang Rubana Bahagian 2, Kampong Sungai Rubana, Sungai Besar, Tanjong Kubu, Kampong Telok Baharu |
| P.074 Lumut | N.51 Pasir Panjang | 17 | Kampong Telok, Kampong Baharu, Sungai Wangi, Ladang Sungai Wangi, Kampong Sitiawan, Samudera, Pundut, Bandar Baru Seri Manjung, Seri Manjung, Kampong Dato Sri Kamarudin, Pasir Panjang, Batu 8 Lekir, FELCRA Lekir, Lekir, Lekir Tengah, Sungai Tiram Lekir, Kayan |
| P.074 Lumut | N.52 Pangkor | 9 | Damar Laut, Lumut, Telok Muroh, Pengkalan TLDM, Sungai Pinang Besar, Sungai Pinang Kechil, Pasir Bogak, Pekan Pangkor, Telok Gedong |
| P.075 Bagan Datuk | N.53 Rungkup | 19 | Melintang Estate, Sungai Pergam, Bagan Datok, Pasang Api, Sungai Balai Baroh, Sungai Betul, Rungkup, Sungai Balai Darat, Sungai Nipah Darat, Simpang Tiga Rungkup, Kuala Perak Estate, Tebok Bengkang, Sungai Batang, Sungai Haji Mohamad, Selekoh, Sungai Che Maja, Sungai Lancang, Sungai Tiang, Bagan Sungai Belukang |
| P.075 Bagan Datuk | N.54 Hutan Melintang | 22 | Tanah Lalang, Sungai Dulang, Kampong Sungai Buloh, Simpang Ampat, Kampong Baharu Batu 16, Kuala Bernam Estate, Batu Dua Puloh, Bagan Pasir, Parit 4, Parit 7, Sungai Sumun, Parit 13, Parit 21, Hutan Melintang, Batu Dua Belas, Jalan Feri, Kampong Baharu Jenderata, Jenderata, Jenderata Estate Div. 3, Kampong Kebun Baru, Kampong Telok Buloh, Kampong Kota |
| P.076 Teluk Intan | N.55 Pasir Bedamar | 19 | Sungai Suli, Sungai Temah, Pasir Bedamar Barat, Pasir Bedamar Utara, Pasir Bedamar Tengah, Pasir Bedamar Selatan, Jalan Market Barat, Jalan Market Timor, Jalan Anson, Jalan Canal, Jalan Speedy, Jalan Sungai Nibong, Eastern Garden, Jalan Laxamana, Kampong Guru, Jalan Batak Rabit Utara, Jalan Batak Rabit Selatan, Taman Seri Setia, Pekan Baru |
| P.076 Teluk Intan | N.56 Changkat Jong | 18 | Sungai Tunku, Kampong Bahagia, Sungai Kerawai, Ladang Sussex, Ladang Selaba, Taman Cecily, Kampong Padang Tembak, Kampong Banjar, Batak Rabit, Nova Scotia, Kampong Selaba, Batu Dua Belas Utara, Kampong Baru Ayer Hitam, Kampong Changkat Jong, Kampong Sungai Samak, Sungai Bugis, Ladang Sungai Samak, Ladang Ulu Bernam |
| P.077 Tanjong Malim | N.57 Sungkai | 14 | Pos Gedong, Jalan Bruseh, Bidor Tengah, Bidor Baharu, Pekan Bidor, Bidor Barat, Bidor Station Utara, Kampong Bahru Jalan Sungkai, Pekan Pasir, Bikam, Kampong Baharu Bikam, Sungkai, Pekan Sungkai, Buloh Telor |
| P.077 Tanjong Malim | N.58 Slim | 13 | Ladang Sungkai, Pekan Lama, Changkat Sulaiman, Trolak Utara, Trolak Selatan, Trolak, Pekan Slim, Sungai Slim Utara, Kampong Kuala Slim, Ladang Kelapa Bali, FELDA Gunong Besout II, FELDA Gunong Besout I, FELDA Gunong Besout V |
| P.077 Tanjong Malim | N.59 Behrang | 22 | Kampong Poh, Perlok, Pos Tenau, Klah, Trolak Timor, Pos Bersih, Ulu Slim, Slim Village, Kampong Sawa, Ladang Clunny, Kampong Balun, Behrang Station, Behrang Timor, Behrang Ulu, Kampong Sungai Sekiah, Kampong Keteyong, Kampong Simpang Ampat, Kampong Lambak, Jalan Keteyong, Kampong Melaka, Jalan Beirop, Kampong Loke Yew |

== Pahang ==
| Federal constituency | State constituency | Polling districts | |
|---|---|---|---|
| P.078 Cameron Highlands | N.01 Tanah Rata | 17 | Pos Terisu, Pos Telanuk, Pos Lemoi, Pos Mensun, Lembah Bertam, Bandar Ringlet, Habu, Ladang Boh 1, Ladang Boh 2, Kea Farm, Tanah Rata, Berinchang, Ladang Sungai Palas, Ladang Blue Valley, Kampung Raja, Kuala Terla, Teringkap |
| P.078 Cameron Highlands | N.02 Jelai | 12 | Pos Lanai, Kuala Medang, Tanjung Gahai, Bukit Kota, Kampung Keledek, Lubuk Kulit, FELDA Sungai Koyan Satu, FELDA Sungai Koyan Dua & Tiga, Pos Betau, Pos Sinderut, Pos Lenjang, Pos Titum |
| P.079 Lipis | N.03 Padang Tengku | 19 | Merapoh, Mentara, Teluk Gunung, Kampung Petola, Pagar Sasak, FELDA Sungai Kechau, Ladang Selborne, Padang Tengku, Gua, Tempoyang, Bapong, Relong, Berchang, Telang, Seberang Jelai, Kechur, Aur Gading, Chegar Perah, Sungai Temau |
| P.079 Lipis | N.04 Cheka | 11 | Kuala Lanar, Kuala Kenong, Mela, Kerambit, Kampung Baru Penjom, Penjom, Cheneras, Sungai Kerpan, Batu Kurap, Bandar Lipis, Bukit Bius |
| P.079 Lipis | N.05 Benta | 12 | Kampung Lalang, Rengai, Tanjung Besar, Jeransang, Kemahang, Kampung Chat, Budu, Pekan Benta, Kampung Baru Benta, Jerkoh, Ladang Benta, Ladang Budu |
| P.080 Raub | N.06 Batu Talam | 12 | Hulu Atok, Atok, Sega, Chenua, Kundang Patah, Cheroh, Hulu Sungai, FELDA Tersang Tiga, FELDA Tersang Dua, FELDA Tersang Satu, Batu Malim, Batu Talam |
| P.080 Raub | N.07 Tras | 16 | Sungai Ruan, Hulu Gali, Pintu Padang, Kampung Sempalit, Kampung Baru Sempalit, Simpang Kallang, Kampung Melayu, Bukit Koman, Sungai Lui, Taman Sentosa, Bandar Raub, Raub Jaya, Pekan Tras, Bukit Fraser, Sungai Chetang, Kampung Sang Lee |
| P.080 Raub | N.08 Dong | 11 | Pamah Rawas, Pamah Kulat, Jeram, FELDA Lembah Klau, FELDA Krau, Gali Tengah, Gali Hilir, Durian Sebatang, Kampung Temau, Pekan Dong, Tanjung Putus |
| P.081 Jerantut | N.09 Tahan | 17 | Kampung Sat, Kampung Gusai, Kampung Bantal, Kampung Mat Daling, Kampung Pagi, FELDA Sungai Retang, FELDA Padang Piol, Kampung Gajah Mati, Pulau Mansuk, Jerantut Feri, Tanah Rom, Teh, Kuala Tembeling, Pasir Durian, Kampung Chebong, Kampung Merting, Kuala Tahan |
| P.081 Jerantut | N.10 Damak | 20 | Batu Balai, Kampung Damak, Kampung Koi, Kampung Som, Kampung Baharu, Kampung Lata Kasah, Bandar Jerantut Luar, Kampung Melayu, Bandar Baru, Sungai Jan, Taman Muhibbah, Inderapura, Kampung Temin, Kampung Gintong, Kampung Batu Kawah, Bukit Dinding, Tebing Tinggi, Jeransong, Sungai Lekok, Hulu Cheka |
| P.081 Jerantut | N.11 Pulau Tawar | 17 | FELDA Kota Gelanggi 2, FELDA Lepar Utara Tiga, FELDA Sungai Tekam Utara, Kampung Perak, Pusat Penyelidikan Tun Razak, FELDA Sungai Tekam, FELDA Jengka 10, FELDA Jengka 8, FELDA Jengka 9, FELDA Jengka 12, FELDA Jengka 13, FELDA Jengka 24, Durian Hijau, Bukit Nikmat, Pulau Tawar, FELDA Kota Gelanggi 1, FELDA Kota Gelanggi 3 |
| P.082 Indera Mahkota | N.12 Beserah | 13 | Cherating, Sungai Ular, Balok Makmur, Balok Baru, Balok, Sungai Karang, Alor Batu, Batu Hitam, Kampung Beserah, Seri Pelindong, Alor Akar, Air Putih Baru, Air Putih |
| P.082 Indera Mahkota | N.13 Semambu | 11 | Kampung Padang, RTP Bukit Goh, Bukit Istana, Semambu, Bukit Sekilau, Indera Mahkota 1, Bukit Ubi, Bukit Setongkol, Taman LKNP, Chenderawasih, Indera Mahkota 2 |
| P.083 Kuantan | N.14 Teruntum | 10 | Seri Kuantan, Perkampungan Teratai, Medan Tok Sira, Kubang Buaya, Kampung Selamat, Bandar Kuantan, Seri Teruntum, Kampung Jawa, Seri Berlian, Lapang Besar |
| P.083 Kuantan | N.15 Tanjung Lumpur | 9 | Medan Warisan, Medan Makmur, Seri Kemunting, Tanjung Lumpur, Kempadang, Kampung Peramu, Tanah Putih Baru, Sungai Isap Murni, Sungai Isap |
| P.083 Kuantan | N.16 Inderapura | 6 | Kampung Belukar, Kuala Penor, Cherok Paloh, Ubai, Kampung Pahang, Taman Guru |
| P.084 Paya Besar | N.17 Sungai Lembing | 7 | Kampung Nadak, Pekan Sungai Lembing, Kuala Kenau, FELDA Bukit Sagu, FELDA Bukit Kuantan, FELDA Bukit Goh, Bukit Kuin |
| P.084 Paya Besar | N.18 Lepar | 9 | Mahkota Jaya, Seri Fajar, Gambang, Jalan Besar, FELDA Lepar Hilir Satu, FELDA Lepar Hilir Dua, FELDA Lepar Hilir Tiga, Paya Bungor, FELDA Lepar Utara Satu |
| P.084 Paya Besar | N.19 Panching | 8 | Bukit Rangin, Kampung Permatang Badak, Pandan Permai, Taman Tas, FELDA Sungai Panching Selatan, FELDA Sungai Panching Timur, FELDA Sungai Panching Utara, Kampung Panching |
| P.085 Pekan | N.20 Pulau Manis | 11 | Seri Mahkota, Jaya Gading, Kampung Seri Damai, Gudang Rasau, Pulau Rusa, Ganchong, Pulau Manis, Lepar, Pelak, Seri Makmur, Belimbing |
| P.085 Pekan | N.21 Peramu Jaya | 16 | Kampung Lamir, Tanah Putih, Peramu Jaya, Serandu, Kuala Pahang, Kampung Marhum, Pasir Panjang, Ketapang, Sungai Miang, Bandar Pekan, Mengkasar, Pulau Jawa, Kelat Rendang, Kampung Langgar, Pahang Tua, Shahbandar |
| P.085 Pekan | N.22 Bebar | 16 | Serambi, Padang Rumbia, Temai, Acheh, Tanjung Medang, Padang Polo, Tanjung Batu, Landai, Nenasi, Merchong, Api Larat, Sawah Batu, Kota Perdana, Simpai, Runchang, Bandar Dua |
| P.085 Pekan | N.23 Chini | 13 | Terpai, Salong, Mambang, Paloh Hinai, Kampung Dusun, FELDA Chini Timur 3 & 4, FELDA Chini Timur 1, FELDA Chini Timur 2, FELDA Chini 5, FELDA Chini 4, FELDA Chini 1, FELDA Chini 2, FELDA Chini 3 |
| P.086 Maran | N.24 Luit | 11 | Kampung Seri Jaya, Kampung New Zealand, Kampung Luit, Serengkam, Kuala Wau, Lubuk Paku, Kampung Senggora, Sri Keramat, Bandar Maran, FELDA Bukit Tajau, Kampung Sentosa |
| P.086 Maran | N.25 Kuala Sentul | 8 | FELDA Jengka 1, Sungai Jerik, Kuala Sentul, FELDA Jengka 5, FELDA Jengka 4, FELDA Jengka 3, FELDA Jengka 2, Ulu Jempol |
| P.086 Maran | N.26 Chenor | 14 | FELDA Jengka 6, FELDA Jengka 7, Paya Pasir, Pesagi, Pejing, Kertau, Sekara, Chenor Seberang, Bandar Chenor, Bukit Segumpal, FELDA Kampung Awah, FELDA Sungai Nerek, Bukit Lada, Kampung Jengka |
| P.087 Kuala Krau | N.27 Jenderak | 11 | Kampung Pian, Sungai Mai, Kuala Mai, Paya Luas, Kuala Krau, FELDA Jenderak Utara, Kampung Jenderak, Kampung Dato Shariff, FELDA Jenderak Selatan, Paya Pelong, Penderas |
| P.087 Kuala Krau | N.28 Kerdau | 13 | Rumpun Makmur, FELDA Jengka 25, FELDA Jengka 22, Kampung Batu Sawar, FELDA Jengka 23, Kuala Tekal, Bukit Lada, Kerai, Lipat Kajang, Desa Murni, Kerdau, Kuala Kerdau, Teluk Sentang |
| P.087 Kuala Krau | N.29 Jengka | 10 | FELDA Jengka 11, Bandar Pusat, FELDA Jengka 14, FELDA Jengka 21, FELDA Jengka 15, FELDA Jengka 16, FELDA Jengka 20, FELDA Jengka 17, FELDA Jengka 18, FELDA Jengka 19 |
| P.088 Temerloh | N.30 Mentakab | 12 | Taman Rimba, Bukit Bendera, Bandar Mentakab, Sungai Semantan, Tanjung Kerayong, Kampung Baharu, Kampung Sungai Ara, Mentakab Tengah, Taman KSM, Kampung Chatin, Sri Kemuning, Temerloh Jaya |
| P.088 Temerloh | N.31 Lanchang | 17 | Tanjung Belengu, Pangsenam, Buntut Pulau, Ladang Yeow Cheng Luan, Desa Bakti, Sri Layang, Batu Kapur, Ladang Edensor, Sungai Kepong, Rantau Panjang, Kampung Dala, Kuala Kawang, Bandar Lanchang, Mempatih, Bolok, FELDA Bukit Damar, FELDA Lakum |
| P.088 Temerloh | N.32 Kuala Semantan | 15 | Sri Semantan, Sanggang, Songsang, Sanggang Seberang, Kampung Gau, Teluk Ira, Bangau, Bandar Temerloh, Kampung Batu, Jalan Bahagia, Sri Bahagia, Lubuk Pasu, Tanjung Batu, Paya Pulai, Lebak Seberang |
| P.089 Bentong | N.33 Bilut | 10 | FELDA Lurah Bilut, Kampung Lebu, Bandar Bentong, Kemansur, Chamang, Repas, Chamang Luar, Chamang Baharu, Desa Damai, Sungai Penjuring |
| P.089 Bentong | N.34 Ketari | 13 | FELDA Mempaga 2, FELDA Mempaga 3, FELDA Mempaga 1, Sungai Dua, Janda Baik, Bukit Tinggi, Sri Layang, Genting Highlands, Benus, Ketari, Perting, Kampung Baharu, Sungai Marong |
| P.089 Bentong | N.35 Sabai | 8 | FELDA Sertik, Jambu Rias, Sri Telemong, Pekan Karak, Karak Setia, Bukit Dinding, Taman Karak, Kampung Baru Karak |
| P.089 Bentong | N.36 Pelangai | 9 | FELDA Sungai Kemasul, FELDA Chemomoi, FELDA Sungai Kemahal, Kampung Jawi-Jawi, Simpang Pelangai, Manchis, Sungai Gapoi, Telemong, Sungai Perdak |
| P.090 Bera | N.37 Guai | 14 | Charok Puting, Batu Bor, Bohor Baharu, FELDA Purun, FELDA Mayam, FELDA Kumai, FELDA Bukit Kepayang, Bukit Rok, Kuala Bera, Kuala Triang, Senyum Jempol, Durian Tawar, Mengkarak, Padang Luas |
| P.090 Bera | N.38 Triang | 9 | Ladang Menteri, Kerayong, Taman Sentosa, Bandar Triang, Kampung Baru Triang, Sri Buntar, Mengkuang, FELDA Bukit Puchong, FELDA Bukit Mendi |
| P.090 Bera | N.39 Kemayan | 13 | Bukit Gemuroh, FELDA Triang Dua & Tiga, FELDA Tementi, FELDA Rentam, FELDA Sebertak, FELDA Bera Selatan, Kampung Pasal, Pos Iskandar, FELDA Tembangau, FELDA Triang Satu, Kampung Dato Seri Hamzah, Kemayan, Ladang Kemayan |
| P.091 Rompin | N.40 Bukit Ibam | 11 | Bandar Bukit Ibam, Kampung Aur, Kota Bahagia, Bukit Serok, FELDA Keratong 2, FELDA Keratong 3, FELDA Keratong 5, FELDA Keratong 7, FELDA Keratong 4, FELDA Keratong 1, FELDA Selancar 1 |
| P.091 Rompin | N.41 Muadzam Shah | 12 | Muadzam Shah, Bukit Ridan, FELDA Keratong 10, FELDA Keratong 9, FELDA Keratong 8, Kedaik, Gading, Leban Chondong, FELDA Keratong 6, Chenderawasih, FELDA Selancar, FELDA Selancar 3 |
| P.091 Rompin | N.42 Tioman | 15 | Sungai Puteri, Kuala Rompin, Bandar Baru Rompin, Pontian, FELDA Selendang, Sarang Tiong, Kampung Janglau, Kampung Jawa, Endau, Pianggu, Denai, Tekek, Juara, Kampung Genting, Mukut |

== Selangor ==
| Federal constituency | State constituency | Polling districts | |
|---|---|---|---|
| P.092 Sabak Bernam | N.01 Sungai Air Tawar | 15 | Parit Baharu Baruh, Sungai Tengar Utara, Sungai Air Tawar, Sungai Bernam, Sungai Air Tawar Selatan, Sungai Tengar Selatan, Kampung Parit Baharu, Kampung Teluk Belanga, Beting Kepah, Kampung Teluk Rhu, Simpang Empat, Kampung Sekendi, Kampung Banting, Kampung Batu 38 Baruh, Kampung Baharu |
| P.092 Sabak Bernam | N.02 Sabak | 17 | Sabak Bernam Barat, Kampung Air Manis, Kampung Seri Aman, Tebuk Pulai, Torkington, Sabak Bernam Timur, Bagan Nira, Kampung Sapintas, Kampung Bagan Terap, Bagan Terap Parit Sembilan, Tebuk Kenchong, Parit Enam, Parit Dua Timur, Parit Tiga & Empat, Parit Satu Barat, Sungai Lias, Batu 4 Sapintas |
| P.093 Sungai Besar | N.03 Sungai Panjang | 19 | Parit 16 – Belia 2, Parit 13 – 15 Sungai Panjang, Parit 6 – 12 Sungai Panjang, Parit 2 – 5 Sungai Panjang, Pekan Sungai Besar, Bagan Sungai Besar, Parit Satu Timur, Sungai Limau, Sungai Haji Dorani, Peket Enam Puluh, Simpang Lima, Parit 13 Sungai Nipah, Sungai Nipah, Sungai Nibong, Pasir Panjang Tengah, Pasir Panjang Selatan, Taman Berkat, Parit 6 – 12 Timur, Kampung Baharu Nelayan |
| P.093 Sungai Besar | N.04 Sekinchan | 11 | Sungai Leman Bendang Utara, Sungai Leman Bendang Tengah, Sungai Leman Bendang Selatan, Sungai Leman Kampung Darat, Sungai Leman Kampung Laut, Sekinchan Selatan, Sekinchan Tempatan Selatan, Sekinchan Tempatan Tengah, Sekinchan Tempatan (Site B), Kian Sit, Sekinchan |
| P.094 Hulu Selangor | N.05 Hulu Bernam | 15 | Kawasan S.K.C, Ladang Lima Belas, Gedangsa, Sungai Selisik, Kampung Gesir, Kampung Sungai Dusun, Kampung Desa Maju, Kampung Sungai Tengi Selatan, Changkat Asa, Kampung Hulu Bernam, Ladang Escot, Kampung Gumut, Bandar Kalumpang, Kampung Baharu Kalumpang, Kuala Kalumpang |
| P.094 Hulu Selangor | N.06 Kuala Kubu Baharu | 16 | Kampung Baharu Kerling, Pertak, Ampang Pechah, Kampung Baharu China K.K.B, Bandar Kuala Kubu Baharu, Kampung Air Jernih, Kerling, Lembah Beringin, Ladang Nigel Gardner, Jalan Kuala Kali, Kampung Baharu Rasa, Pekan Rasa, Kampung Baharu Batang Kali, Hulu Yam Lama, Bandar Utama Batang Kali, Batu 30 Hulu Yam |
| P.094 Hulu Selangor | N.07 Batang Kali | 19 | Bukit Rasa, Batang Kali, Hulu Kali, Kampung Padang, Hulu Yam Baru 1, Hulu Yam Baru 2, Serendah, Sungai Choh, Sungai Gapi, Taman Bukit Teratai, Sungai Buaya, Bukit Beruntung, Bandar Sungai Buaya, Bukit Sentosa 1 Hingga 5, Bukit Sentosa 6 Hingga 12, Taman Bunga Raya, Kampung Baharu Serendah, Taman Bunga Raya 2, Seri Serendah |
| P.095 Tanjong Karang | N.08 Sungai Burong | 15 | Terusan Besar, Sawah Sempadan Utara, Sungai Burong Bendang, Sungai Burong Utara, Sungai Burong Selatan, Batu 9 Tanjong Karang, Sungai Sireh, Sungai Sireh Utara, Sawah Sempadan Selatan, Sungai Tengi Kanan, Sungai Kajang, Pekan Tanjong Karang, Batu 7 Tanjong Karang, Batu 11 Tanjong Karang, Bagan Pasir Tanjong Karang |
| P.095 Tanjong Karang | N.09 Permatang | 19 | Hulu Tiram Buruk, Hulu Tiram Buruk Utara, Batang Berjuntai Satu, Ladang Mary, Sungai Tinggi, Batang Berjuntai Utara, Kampung Raja Musa, Ladang Raja Musa, Kampung Baharu Tiram Buruk, Parit Serong, Sungai Gulang-Gulang, Hujung Permatang, Belimbing, Permatang, Pasir Penambang, Sungai Yu, Sungai Terap, Sawah Sempadan, Kampung Lubuk Jaya |
| P.096 Kuala Selangor | N.10 Bukit Melawati | 14 | Kuala Selangor, Bandar Baru, Asam Jawa, Kampung Kuantan Kelab, Kampung Kuantan, Pasangan, Ladang Sungai Rambai, Bukit Rotan, Api-Api, Teluk Piai, Bukit Kuching, Pekan Sungai Buluh, Jeram Utara, Sasaran Jeram |
| P.096 Kuala Selangor | N.11 Ijok | 11 | Sungai Darah, Bestari Jaya Selatan, Jaya Setia, Bukit Badong, Kampung Ijok, Pekan Ijok, Simpang Ijok, Bestari Jaya Utara, Ladang Bukit Ijok, Parit Mahang, Bukit Cherakah |
| P.096 Kuala Selangor | N.12 Jeram | 12 | FELDA Bukit Cherakah, Bukit Hijau, Bukit Kuching Tengah, Simpang Tiga, Jeram, Sungai Sembilang, Tambak Jawa, Bukit Cloh, Bukit Kerayong, Jeram Pantai, Bandar Puncak Alam, Tuan Mee |
| P.097 Selayang | N.13 Kuang | 9 | Pengkalan Kundang, Sungai Serai, Pekan Kuang, Kampung Gombak, Kampung Kuang, Kampung Cempedak, Sri Kundang, Bandar Tasik Puteri, Penjara Sungai Buloh |
| P.097 Selayang | N.14 Rawang | 18 | Bandar Country Home 1, Kuala Garing, Kampung Rajah, Rawang, Kampung Melayu, Kampung Kenanga, Kampung Baharu Rawang, Taman Sri Hijau, Kanching, Taman Bersatu, Taman Bukit Rawang, Kampung Tanjung, Bandar Country Home 2, Kota Emerald East & West, Garing Jaya, Batu Arang Barat, Batu Arang Timur, Batu Arang Selatan |
| P.097 Selayang | N.15 Taman Templer | 16 | Batu 16 Rawang, Bandar Baru Selayang Utara, Bukit Idaman, Selayang Baharu Tiga, Selayang Baharu Dua, Selayang Baharu Satu, Taman Selayang Baharu, Selayang Pandang, Sri Melati, Bandar Baru Selayang Selatan, Kampung Bendahara, Lembah Mutiara, Kampung Selayang Permai, Kampung Selayang Indah, Taman Selayang Indah, Prima Selayang |
| P.098 Gombak | N.16 Sungai Tua | 12 | Wira Damai, Taman Jasa, Sungai Tua, Kampung Nakhoda, Kampung Laksamana, Selayang Baharu Empat, Selayang Baharu Lima, Taman Selayang, Taman Batu Caves, Pekan Batu Caves Lama, Batu Caves, Batu 8 Sungai Tua |
| P.098 Gombak | N.17 Gombak Setia | 15 | Sri Gombak 9, Taman Greenwood, Simpang Tiga, Batu 8 Gombak, Gombak Selatan, Gombak Setia, Sri Gombak 2 – 7, Taman Gombak, Sri Gombak 1, Batu 9 Gombak, Taman Kamariah, Sri Gombak 10, Sri Gombak 8, Pinggiran Batu Caves, Taman Selaseh |
| P.098 Gombak | N.18 Hulu Kelang | 20 | Bandar Melawati, Kelang Gate, Taman Melawati, Kemensah, Hulu Kelang, Taman Permata, Keramat Tengah AU 4, AU3 Rumah Teres, Sri Keramat AU 2A, Keramat AU 1, Keramat Pangsa, Melawati Jalan F & H, Lembah Keramat AU 5C, Desa Keramat AU 2B & AU 2C, Lembah Keramat AU 5D, Keramat AU 1B, AU3 Rumah Pangsa, Melawati Jalan G.E.C, Enggang Utara, Enggang Selatan |
| P.099 Ampang | N.19 Bukit Antarabangsa | 19 | Taman Dato Ahmad Razali, Bukit Antarabangsa, Ukay Height, Ampang Jaya, Taman Perwira, Kampung Baharu Ampang 1, Kampung Melayu Ampang, Pekan Ampang, Kampung Baharu Ampang 2, Kampung Sri Tanjung, Pinggiran Ukay, Kuala Ampang, Ukay Perdana, Kampung Baharu Ampang Kedua, Kampung Baharu Ampang Pertama, Bandar Baru Ampang, Kampung Baharu Ampang Ketiga, Taman Dagang, Taman Cahaya |
| P.099 Ampang | N.20 Lembah Jaya | 18 | Taman Tun Abdul Razak, Lembah Jaya Utara, Taman Kosas, Bukit Indah Jalan 1 & 2, Seri Watan, Seri Ampang, Bukit Ampang, Tasik Tambahan Utara, Ampang Campuran Jalan Ikan Emas, Lembah Jaya Selatan, Kampung Tengah Lembah Jaya, Taman Ampang Indah, Taman Rasmi Jaya, Tasik Tambahan Selatan, Kampung Ampang Indah, Taman Mulia Jaya, Ampang Campuran Jalan Ikan Jelawat, Bukit Indah Jalan 3 |
| P.100 Pandan | N.21 Pandan Indah | 18 | Taman Nirwana, Angsana Hilir, Kampung Pandan Dalam Kiri, Lorong Raya Kampung Pandan, Pandan Jaya Utara, Taman Chempaka, Pandan Indah Jalan 1, 4 dan 6, Lorong Molek Kampung Pandan, Lorong Bersih Kampung Pandan, Pandan Jaya Selatan, Taman Bakti, Pandan Indah Jalan 2 & 3, Ampang Hilir, Cheras Indah, Taman Maju Jaya, Taman Kenchana, Kampung Cheras Baharu Timur, Desa Nirwana |
| P.100 Pandan | N.22 Teratai | 16 | Pandan Perdana Timur, Taman Muda Timur, Taman Putra, Taman Seraya, Taman Melor, Taman Mega Jaya, Taman Mawar, Taman Bukit Teratai, Pandan Perdana Barat, Kampung Cheras Baharu Barat, Taman Muda Barat, Taman Saga, Cheras Hartamas, Tasik Permai, Pandan Indah Jalan 5, Pandan Mewah |
| P.101 Hulu Langat | N.23 Dusun Tua | 18 | Pansun, Lui, Kampung Jawa, Pekan Lui, Sungai Tekali, Dusun Tua, Batu 14 Hulu Langat, Sungai Serai, Batu 9 Cheras, Kampung Sungai Raya, Taman Suntex, Taman Cuepac, Batu 13 Hulu Langat, Sri Nanding, Kampung Melaka, Taman Alam Jaya, Taman Kota Cheras, Batu 10 Cheras |
| P.101 Hulu Langat | N.24 Semenyih | 23 | Semenyih Barat, Hulu Semenyih, Tarun, Kampung Tanjong, Kampung Baharu Semenyih, Pekan Semenyih, Semenyih Selatan, Kampung Rinching, Bandar Rinching Seksyen 1 - 4, Sesapan Kelubi, Sesapan Batu, Sungai Jai, Beranang, Kuala Pajam, Sungai Kembung, Sesapan Batu Rembau, Kampung Batu 26 Beranang, Penjara Kajang, Semenyih Indah, Bandar Rinching Seksyen 5 - 6, Bandar Tasik Kesuma, Kantan Permai, Bukit Mahkota |
| P.102 Bangi | N.25 Kajang | 21 | Sungai Sekamat, Saujana Impian, Taman Mesra, Sungai Kantan, Taman Kajang Baharu, Kajang, Taman Delima, Bandar Kajang, Bandar Sungai Long, Bandar Mahkota, Taman Rakan, Taman Asa Jaya, Kajang Perdana, Sungai Jeluk, Taman Bukit Mewah, Reko Utara, Taman Jasmin, Reko Selatan, Taman Kajang Mewah, Bukit Kajang Baru, Kajang Prima |
| P.102 Bangi | N.26 Sungai Ramal | 14 | Sungai Ramal Luar, Sungai Ramal Dalam, Seksyen 3 BBB, Seksyen 1 BBB, Seksyen 6 BBB, Bangi, Taman Kajang Utama, Seksyen 4 BBB, Seksyen 5 BBB, Seksyen 2 BBB, Universiti Kebangsaan Malaysia, Seksyen 7,8 dan 9 BBB, Bandar Teknologi Kajang, Impian Ehsan |
| P.102 Bangi | N.27 Balakong | 18 | Kampung Baharu Balakong, Bandar Damai Perdana, Perimbun, Batu 11 Cheras, Cheras Perdana, Bandar Tun Hussein Onn, Simpang Balak, Desa Baiduri, Cheras Jaya, Taman Suria Jaya, Taman Sri Bahagia, Balakong Jaya, Taming Jaya, Sungai Chua Satu, Sungai Chua Dua, Sungai Chua Tiga, Sungai Chua Empat, Sungai Chua Lima |
| P.103 Puchong | N.28 Seri Kembangan | 21 | Serdang Lama, Serdang Utama, Seri Kembangan 2, Seri Kembangan 1, Seri Kembangan 4, Seri Kembangan 5, Seri Kembangan 9, Seri Kembangan 11, Seri Kembangan 8, Seri Kembangan 10, Seri Kembangan 12, Seri Kembangan 7, Seri Kembangan 6, Seri Kembangan 3, Bukit Serdang, Taman Universiti Indah, Desa Serdang, Taman Muhibbah, Sungai Besi Indah, Serdang Raya, Taman Bukit Belimbing |
| P.103 Puchong | N.29 Seri Serdang | 14 | Serdang Jaya 1, Seri Serdang Utara, Kawasan UPM, Kampung Sri Aman, Batu 14 Puchong, Seri Serdang Selatan 1, Bandar Bukit Puchong, Taman Puchong Utama, Taman Pinggiran Putra, Serdang Jaya 2, Puchong Permai, Seri Indah, Seri Serdang Selatan 2, Kampung Batu 13 |
| P.104 Subang | N.30 Kinrara | 23 | Kinrara Seksyen 4, 5 & 6, Kinrara Seksyen 2, Kinrara Seksyen 1, Kinrara Seksyen 7, Kinrara Seksyen 3, Puchong Jaya Timur, Puchong Jaya Utara, Puchong Jaya Barat, Batu 12 Puchong, Batu 7 Jalan Puchong, Batu 13 Puchong, Bandar Kinrara Seksyen 1, Pusat Bandar Puchong, Bandar Kinrara Seksyen 2, Bandar Kinrara Seksyen 3, Bandar Kinrara Seksyen 4, Bandar Kinrara Seksyen 5, Bandar Puteri, Puchong Indah 1, Puchong Perdana 1, Puchong Perdana 2, Puchong Indah 2, Puchong Intan |
| P.104 Subang | N.31 Subang Jaya | 26 | PJS 7 Bandar Sunway, SS 12, SS 15, SS 16 & SS 17, SS 19/1, SS 18, SS 14/1-4, SS 13, USJ 1, USJ 2/1-4, USJ 3, USJ 4, USJ 5, USJ 6, USJ 7 & 8, USJ 9 & USJ 10, USJ 11, USJ 12, USJ 13, USJ 14 & 15, SS 19/2 – SS 19/5, SS 19/6 – SS 19/19, PJS 9 & 11 Bandar Sunway, SS 14/5-8, USJ 2/5-7, USJ 16 hingga 22 |
| P.105 Petaling Jaya | N.32 Seri Setia | 20 | Glenmarie, SS 6, SS 5D, SS 5B & 5C, SS 5A, Seri Setia, PJS 5 Kampung Penaga, PJS 6/4 – PJS 6/6, PJS 10/1 – PJS 10/16, Rumah Pangsa Sungai Way, PJS 5/1 – PJS 5/12, PJS 6/1 – PJS 6/3, PJS 8, PJS 10/17 – PJS 10/34, SS 7, Kampung Lindungan, PJS 5/13 – PJS 5/30, Taman TTDI Jaya, Ara Damansara, Taman Glenmarie |
| P.105 Petaling Jaya | N.33 Taman Medan | 16 | Seksyen 51, Seksyen 4 Petaling Jaya, Kawasan Melayu, PJS 1, Medan Pejasa, Taman Dato Harun 1, Taman Dato Harun 2, PJS 3, PJS 4, Baiduri, Petaling Utama, PJS 2, PJS 2C/12, PJS 2D, Kampung Medan, PJS 2C |
| P.105 Petaling Jaya | N.34 Bukit Gasing | 20 | Seksyen 17 Utara, Seksyen 17 Barat, Seksyen 17 Tengah, Seksyen 17 Selatan, Seksyen 16, Jalan Bukit, Jalan Semangat, Seksyen 5 Utara, Taman Jaya, Kawasan Assunta Convent, Kawasan Bandar Baharu, Jalan Sungai Jernih, Seksyen Satu Petaling Jaya, Kawasan Bangunan K.K.P.L, Seksyen 5 Selatan, Seksyen 17A, Seksyen 19, Seksyen 14 Utara, Seksyen 14 Selatan, Seksyen 2 Petaling Jaya |
| P.106 Damansara | N.35 Kampung Tunku | 18 | Seksyen 21 Timur, Seksyen 20 Utara, Seksyen 20 Selatan, Seksyen 22, Kampung Tunku Utara, Kampung Tunku Selatan, SS 3 Utara, SS 3 Barat, SS 3 Timur, Sungai Way Utara, Sungai Way Tengah Dua, Sungai Way Tengah Satu, Sungai Way Selatan Dua, Sungai Way Selatan Satu, SS 2 Utara, SS 2 Tengah, SS 2 Selatan, Seksyen 21 Barat |
| P.106 Damansara | N.36 Bandar Utama | 18 | SS 21 Utara, SS 20, Damansara Jaya Utara, SS 23, SS 24, SS 26, Kampung Chempaka, SS 25, SS 4, SS 21 Selatan, Damansara Jaya Selatan, Bandar Utama BU 1 & BU 2, Sungai Kayu Ara Utara, Bandar Utama BU 3 - BU 10, Bandar Utama BU 11 - BU 12, Sungai Kayu Ara Selatan, Kayu Ara Indah, Sunway Damansara PJU 3 |
| P.106 Damansara | N.37 Bukit Lanjan | 21 | Desa Jaya Jalan 1- Jalan 19, Sri Damansara Jalan SD1-SD 5, Sri Damansara Jalan SD7 – Jalan SD9, Bukit Lanjan, Desa Jaya Jalan 20 – Jalan 38, Desa Jaya Jalan 39 – Jalan 56, Damansara Damai PJU 10, Sri Damansara Jalan SD 10, Sri Damansara Jalan SD 12, Saujana Damansara PJU 10, Taman Ehsan Jalan 5, Taman Ehsan Jalan 2, Desa Aman Puri, Taman Ehsan Jalan 4, Sungai Buloh, Selayang Utama, Kepong Utara, Selayang Jaya, Taman Daya, Taman Indah Perdana, Taman Bidara |
| P.107 Sungai Buloh | N.38 Paya Jaras | 11 | Petempatan Sungai Buloh, Bandar Baru Sungai Buloh Utara, Bukit Rahman Putra, Merbau Sempak, Paya Jaras, Bandar Baru Sungai Buloh Selatan, Sungai Pelong, Paya Jaras Hilir, Matang Pagar, Kubu Gajah, Taman Saujana Utama |
| P.107 Sungai Buloh | N.39 Kota Damansara | 17 | Kampung Baharu Sungai Buloh Sekolah, Kampung Baharu Sungai Buloh Dewan, RRI Sungai Buloh, Pinggiran Subang, Taman Subang Baru, Kampung Melayu Subang, Subang Perdana, Kota Damansara Seksyen 4 dan 5, LTSSAAS Subang, Kampung Baharu Subang, Kota Damansara Seksyen 7, Jalan Merbau Kampung Melayu Subang, Mutiara Subang, Kota Damansara Seksyen 6, Kota Damansara Seksyen 8 dan 9, Kota Damansara Seksyen 10 dan 11, Kem Sungai Buloh |
| P.108 Shah Alam | N.40 Kota Anggerik | 20 | Setia Alam, Monterez, Shah Alam S 9, Shah Alam S 8, Shah Alam S 1 & S 7/23-7/76, Shah Alam S 6, Shah Alam S 3, Shah Alam S 2, Shah Alam S 4 & S 5, Shah Alam S 10, Shah Alam S 11, S 12 & S 14, Shah Alam S 15 & S 16, Mutiara Bukit Raja, Pangsapuri S7, Bukit Jelutong U8, Shah Alam S 13, Apartment S16, Bukit Bandaraya, Bukit Subang, Shah Alam S 7/1-7/22 |
| P.108 Shah Alam | N.41 Batu Tiga | 20 | Taman Batu Tiga, Kampung Kebun Bunga, Pinggiran USJ, Shah Alam S 20 – S 23, Shah Alam S 19/15-19/31, Shah Alam S 19/1 – 19/14, Shah Alam S 24/1-24/38, Apartment S 24, Shah Alam S 17 Timur, Padang Jawa, Sungai Rasau, Kampung Kuantan, Taman Kampung Kuantan, Shah Alam S 17 Barat, Rimba Jaya, Shah Alam S 18 Barat 1, Shah Alam S 18 Timur, Shah Alam S 18 Barat 2, Shah Alam S 19/32-19/50, Shah Alam S 24 |
| P.109 Kapar | N.42 Meru | 12 | Kampung Meru, Kampung Haji Shariff, Kampung Nenas, Pekan Meru, Jalan Haji Salleh, Taman Meru Indah, Pekan Kapar, Batu 9 Kapar, Batu 10 Kapar, Sungai Kapar Indah, Taman Kapar Indah, Kampung Budiman |
| P.109 Kapar | N.43 Sementa | 16 | Kampung Sungai Serdang, Kampung Tok Muda, Perepat, Sementa, Kampung Batu Empat, Batu 11 & 12 Kapar, Taman Sri Kerayong, Taman Chempaka Sari, Kapar, Bukit Kapar Utara, Bukit Kapar Selatan, Kampung Sungai Pinang, Rantau Panjang, Kampung Batu Tiga, Teluk Kapas, Taman Klang Perdana |
| P.109 Kapar | N.44 Selat Klang | 16 | Sungai Udang Utara, Jalan Yadi, Kampong Delek, Sungai Sirih, Kuala Klang, Sri Perantau, Tanjong Klang, Sungai Lima, Bandar Pulau Ketam, Bagan Teo Chew, Sungai Udang Selatan, Kampong Delek Kanan, Kampong Delek Kiri, Bandar Sultan Sulaiman, Kampung Raja Uda Timur, Kampung Raja Uda Barat |
| P.110 Klang | N.45 Bandar Baru Klang | 19 | Taman Eng Ann 1, Persiaran Sultan Ibrahim 2, Bandar Klang, Sungai Pinang Selatan, Pasar Jawa, Jalan Goh Hock Huat, Persiaran Sultan Ibrahim 1, Taman Eng Ann 2, Taman Berkeley, Bandar Baru Klang, Bukit Kuda, Kampung Batu Belah, Taman Klang, Jalan Meru, Klang Kawasan 19, Taman Klang Utama 1, Taman Klang Utama 2, Sungai Bertih Selatan, Sungai Bertih Utara |
| P.110 Klang | N.46 Pelabuhan Klang | 14 | Kampung Pendamar, Kampung Idaman, Jalan Padang, Kawasan Pelabuhan, Jalan Kem, Teluk Gong Utara, Pulau Indah Utara, Pulau Indah Selatan, Pandamaran Jaya Jalan 1-12, Teluk Gong Selatan, Pandamaran Jaya Jalan 13-100, Seri Pendamar, Pandamaran Jaya Apartment, Selat Selatan |
| P.110 Klang | N.47 Pandamaran | 23 | Kompleks Sukan Pandamaran, Kawasan Sekolah Cina ‘B’, Kawasan Sekolah Cina ‘A’, Pandamaran, Jalan Tengku Badar Utara, Jalan Tengku Badar Selatan, Jalan Kastam, Tengku Bendahara Azman, Raja Lumu, Sungai Aur, Teluk Pulai Utara, Kampung Attap, Jalan Tengku Kelana, Bukit Istana, Simpang Tujuh, Taman Gembira 1, Taman Selatan 1, Teluk Gadung Besar, Taman Chi Liung, Teluk Pulai Selatan, Taman Selatan 2, Taman Bayu Perdana, Taman Gembira 2 |
| P.111 Kota Raja | N.48 Sentosa | 13 | Taman Klang Jaya 1, Sentosa Dato Yusof Shahbuddin, Taman Desawan, Sentosa Dato Abdul Hamid 1, Sentosa Dato Dagang, Taman Klang Jaya 2, Sentosa Dato Abdul Hamid 2, Bandar Bukit Tinggi 1, Taman Maznah, Batu 4 Jalan Kebun, Taman Menara Maju, Bandar Bukit Tinggi 2, Bandar Botanic |
| P.111 Kota Raja | N.49 Sungai Kandis | 19 | Seksyen 34 Shah Alam, Sungai Kandis, Teluk Menegun, LLN Connought Bridge, Kampung Pandan, Kampung Jawa, Kota Raja, Taman Seri Andalas 1, Taman Seri Andalas 2, Bukit Jati, Taman Seri Andalas 3, Jalan Raya Timur, Bandar Puteri Klang, Jalan Kebun, Johan Setia, Seri Gambut, Kampung Bukit Naga, Haji Husin Jalan Kebun, Taman Berjaya |
| P.111 Kota Raja | N.50 Kota Kemuning | 14 | Shah Alam S 27 A, Shah Alam S 28, Sri Muda 1, Sri Muda 2 Utara, Bukit Kemuning, Kampung Baru HICOM, Putra Height, Sri Muda 2 Selatan, Kota Kemuning Jalan 31/1-31/80, Bukit Rimau, Shah Alam S 27 B, Apartment S 28, Kota Kemuning Jalan 31/81 – 31/170, Shah Alam S 26 |
| P.112 Kuala Langat | N.51 Sijangkang | 19 | Sijangkang Utara, Sijangkang Dalam Utara, Sijangkang Dalam Selatan, Sijangkang Selatan, Batu 9 Kebun Baharu, Teluk 1, Ladang Carey Barat, Ladang Carey Selatan, Ladang Carey Timur, Teluk 2, Sungai Bumbun, Batu 10 Kebun Baharu, Sijangkang Jaya, Taman Panglima, Bukit Kemandul, Seri Cheeding, Bukit Cheeding (A), Kampung Jenjarum, Bandar Saujana Putra |
| P.112 Kuala Langat | N.52 Banting | 13 | Jenjarum Tempatan Kedua, Jenjarum Tempatan Ketiga, Jenjarum Tempatan Keempat, Kota Sri Langat, Sungai Manggis Utara, Sungai Manggis Selatan, Teluk Datuk, Teluk Bunut, Jenjarum, Jenjarum Tempatan Pertama, Banting Jaya, Pulau Banting, Pekan Banting |
| P.112 Kuala Langat | N.53 Morib | 13 | Sungai Buaya, Sungai Buaya Tengah, Bandar, Jugra, Sungai Raba, Kanchong, Kelanang, Kanchong Timur, Kanchong Tengah, Simpang Morib, Morib, Sri Putra, Taman Kemuning |
| P.113 Sepang | N.54 Tanjong Sepat | 14 | Bukit Bangkung, Sungai Rawang, Tanjong Rhu, Tanjong Sepat Tempatan 1, Tanjong Sepat Tempatan 2, Tanjong Sepat Tempatan 3, Tanjong Sepat Tempatan 4, Tanjong Sepat Tempatan 5, Tanjong Sepat 6, Kundang, Batu Laut, Kampung Endah, Sungai Lang, Sungai Kelambu |
| P.113 Sepang | N.55 Dengkil | 23 | Sungai Lempit, Bukit Canggang, Labuhan Dagang, Ampar Tenang, Kampung Baharu Dengkil, Kampung Dengkil, Pulau Meranti, Sungai Merab Utara, Kampung Dato Abu Bakar Baginda, Sungai Merab, Desa Putra, Jenderam Hilir, Sungai Buah, RTB Datok Harun, Ladang Ampar Tenang, Kampung Melot, Bandar Putra Perdana, Taman Permata Dengkil, Desa Air Hitam, Cyberjaya, Selangor Dredging, Desa Pinggiran Putra, Kota Warisan |
| P.113 Sepang | N.56 Sungai Pelek | 14 | Jenderam Hulu, Salak, Salak Jijan, Lothian Timur, Sepang Utara, Sepang Selatan, Hulu Cucuh, Bagan Lalang, Sungai Pelek Tiga, Sungai Pelek Dua, Sungai Pelek Empat, Bandar Baru Salak Tinggi, Taman Seroja, Taman Mawar |

== Federal Territory of Kuala Lumpur ==
| Federal constituency | Polling districts | |
|---|---|---|
| P.114 Kepong | 19 | Jinjang Tempatan 1, Jinjang Tempatan 2, Jinjang Tempatan 3, Jinjang Tempatan 4, Jinjang Tempatan 10, Jinjang Tempatan 11, Jinjang Tempatan 12, Jinjang Tengah, Jinjang Utara, Jinjang Tempatan Utara, Pekan Kepong, Taman Kepong, Kepong Baru Barat, Kepong Baru Tengah, Kepong Baru Timor, Kepong Baru Tambahan, Kepong Utara, Kepong Selatan, Kampong Melayu Kepong, |
| P.115 Batu | 23 | Kampong Selayang Lama, Taman Sri Murni, Taman Intan Baiduri, Taman Beringin, Taman Wahyu, Taman Batu Permai, Taman Batu Muda, Batu Muda, Taman Koperasi Polis Fasa II, Batu Kantomen, Pekan Batu, Taman Rainbow, Taman Million, Sentul Pasar, Sentul Jaya, Sentul Utara, Pekan Setapak, Rumah Pangsa Sri Perak, Bandar Baru Sentul, Sentul Tengah, Kampong Kovil Utara, Kampong Kovil Selatan, Sentul Selatan |
| P.116 Wangsa Maju | 20 | Flat Taman Melati, Taman Melati, Rumah Pangsa Dewan Bandaraya Gombak, Taman Ibu Kota, Taman Setapak, Gombak Utara, Changkat, Kampong Padang Balang, Gombak Selatan, Kampong Puah, Taman P.Ramlee, Jalan Gombak, Teratai Mewah, Danau Kota, Genting Kelang, Seksyen 1 Wangsa Maju, Taman Desa Setapak, Seksyen 2 Wangsa Maju, Seksyen 4 Wangsa Maju, Taman Wangsa Melawati |
| P.117 Segambut | 24 | Taman Bukit Maluri Utara, Taman Bukit Maluri Selatan, Bandar Manjalara, Desa Park City, Taman Sri Sinar, Sri Segambut, Kampong Sungai Udang, Taman Kok Doh, Taman City Kanan, Taman Segambut, Dutamas, Sri Hartamas, Segambut, Bukit Lanjan, Kampong Sungai Penchala, Medan Damansara, Bukit Damansara, Bukit Tunku, Kampong Kasipillay, Kolam Ayer, Taman Tun Dr Ismail Utara, Taman Tun Dr Ismail Tengah, Taman Tun Dr Ismail Selatan, Taman Tun Dr Ismail Timur |
| P.118 Setiawangsa | 17 | Jalan Usahawan, Taman Sri Rampai, Seksyen 5/6 Wangsa Maju, PKNS Batu 6 Ulu Klang, Keramat Wangsa, Taman Setiawangsa, Seksyen 10 Wangsa Maju, Desa Rejang, Taman Setapak Permai, Taman Setapak Jaya, Ayer Panas Dalam, Ayer Panas Luar, Ayer Panas Tengah, Jalan Pahang, Taman Tasek, Pulapol, Mindef |
| P.119 Titiwangsa | 20 | Setapak Selatan, Kompleks Damai, Jalan Raja Muda, Kampong Bharu Utara, Kampong Bharu Tengah, Kampong Bharu Selatan, Dato Keramat Utara, Dato Keramat Tengah, Dato Keramat Selatan, Dato Keramat Seberang, Jalan Ampang, Jalan Mengkudu, Desa Pandan, Kelab Golf Selangor, Taman Maluri, Kampong Pandan Dalam, Kampong Pandan Tengah, Jalan Cochrane, Kampong Pandan Luar, Jalan Jejaka |
| P.120 Bukit Bintang | 28 | Tiong Nam, Kampong Semarang, Jalan Tuanku Abdul Rahman, Jalan Melayu, Medan Pasar, Bukit Nanas, Imbi Pasar, Changkat Raja Chulan, Bukit Weld, Medan Imbi, Kampong Loke Yuen, Pudu Kanan, Jalan Hang Tuah, Lebohraya Foch, Jalan Sultan, Jalan Tun Sambanthan, Brickfields Utara, Brickfields Selatan, Bukit Petaling, Persiaran Syed Putra, Lapangan Terbang, Razak Mansion, Salak Selatan, Taman Sungai Besi, Salak Tempatan Bukit, Salak Tempatan Changkat, Salak Tempatan Dalam, Desa Petaling |
| P.121 Lembah Pantai | 18 | Tasik Perdana, Bukit Travers, Jalan Maarof, Bukit Bangsar, Bangsar Baru, Taman Lucky, Kawasan Universiti, Pantai Baharu, Bukit Kerinchi, Kampong Haji Abdullah Hukom, Kampong Pantai Halt, Taman Bukit Angkasa, Pantai Hill Park, Pantai Dalam, Kampong Pasir, Petaling Selatan, Taman Sri Sentosa Utara, Taman Sri Sentosa Selatan |
| P.122 Seputeh | 22 | Kampong Penghulu Mat, Seputeh, Taman Desa, Kuchai, Taman United, Taman Happy Utara, Taman Happy Tengah, Taman Happy Selatan, Kuchai Entrepreneurs Park, Taman Salak South Utara, Taman Salak South, Taman Sri Petaling Timur, Taman Sri Petaling, Bandar Sri Petaling, Taman Overseas Union Selatan, Taman Overseas Union Utara, Taman Yarl, Kampong Bahagia, Kampong Bohol, PPR Muhibbah, Bukit Jalil, Kampong Sungai Besi |
| P.123 Cheras | 24 | Jalan Pasar, Jalan San Peng, Rumah Pangsa Loke Yew, Jalan Loke Yew, Kampong Loke Yew, Jalan Sungai Besi, Jalan Chan Sow Lin, Pudu Hujung, Jalan Cheras, Pudu Ulu, Taman Miharja, Batu 3-4 Jalan Cheras, Taman Shamelin Perkasa, Kampong Cheras Batu 4, Bukit A Cheras Baru, Cheras Baru, Taman Cheras, Taman Midah Kanan, Taman Midah Kiri, Taman Mutiara Barat, Taman Segar, Taynton View, Taman Connaught Utara, Taman Connaught Selatan |
| P.124 Bandar Tun Razak | 19 | Rumah Pangsa Sri Johor Cheras, Rumah Pangsa Sri Pulau Pinang Cheras, Rumah Pangsa Sri Sabah Cheras, Taman Ikan Emas, Rumah Pangsa Sri Melaka Cheras, Sri Permaisuri, Bandar Sri Permaisuri, Rumah Pangsa Sri Labuan Cheras, Sri Kota, Taman Mulia, Bandar Tun Razak, Desa Tun Razak, Kampung Malaysia, Bandar Tasik Selatan, Pekan Sungai Besi, Kem Tentera, Taman Len Sen, Taman Bukit Cheras, Taman Bukit Anggerik |

== Federal Territory of Putrajaya ==
| Federal constituency | Polling districts | |
|---|---|---|
| P.125 Putrajaya | 4 | Taman Saujana Hijau, Taman Rimba Desa, Taman Wawasan, Taman Warisan |

== Negeri Sembilan ==
| Federal constituency | State constituency | Polling districts | |
|---|---|---|---|
| P.126 Jelebu | N.01 Chennah | 9 | Kampong Sungai Buloh, Durian Tipus, Simpang Durian, Kampong Chennah, Pekan Titi, Sungai Muntoh, Kampong Seperi, Petaling, Kampong Gagu |
| P.126 Jelebu | N.02 Pertang | 8 | Jerang, Kampong Lakai, Pasoh 4, Pasoh 1, Simpang Pertang, Kampong Petaseh, Pertang, Kampong Gelang |
| P.126 Jelebu | N.03 Sungai Lui | 11 | Sungai Lui, Lui Timur, Lui Muda, Lui Selatan, Pulapol Ayer Hitam, Ladang Ayer Hitam, Kampong Bahru Ayer Hitam, Lui Barat, Pasoh 3, Pasoh 2, Kampung Serampang Indah |
| P.126 Jelebu | N.04 Klawang | 7 | Peradong, Ladang Jelebu, Kampong Kampai, Kampung Kuala Klawang, Pekan Kuala Klawang, Kampong Kemin, Kampung Amar Penghulu |
| P.127 Jempol | N.05 Serting | 11 | Serting Ulu, Kampong Serting Tengah, Kampung Serting Ilir, Lubok Gadong, Mahsan Jaya, FELDA Raja Alias, Bandar Baru Serting Ilir, Kampong Geddes, Kampong Geddes Tengah, Ladang Sungai Sebaling, Bandar Seri Jempol |
| P.127 Jempol | N.06 Palong | 9 | Palong 14, 15 & 16, Palong 8, Palong 12 & 13, Palong 7, Palong 9, 10 & 11, Palong 6, Palong 5, Palong 4, Palong 3 |
| P.127 Jempol | N.07 Jeram Padang | 10 | Ladang Bahau, Taman Jaya, Bukit Rokan Barat, Jeram Padang, Ladang Middleton, Ladang Kelpin, Ladang Bukit Pilah, Rompin, Palong 2, Palong 1 |
| P.127 Jempol | N.08 Bahau | 10 | Kampong Bukit Perah, Kampong Batu Kikir, Kampong Lonek, Kuala Jempol, Kampung Kuala Kepis, Kampung Jambu Lapan, Taman ACBE, Pekan Bahau, Kampong Indah, Kampong Bakar Batu |
| P.128 Seremban | N.09 Lenggeng | 9 | Pekan Broga, Ulu Beranang, Kampong Daching, Kampong Rawa Ulu, Lenggeng, Machang, Desa Sri Pantai, Pantai, Panchor |
| P.128 Seremban | N.10 Nilai | 10 | Nilai, Batang Benar, Pekan Pajam, Kampung Gebok, Batu Sebelas, Kampong Bahru Mantin, Pekan Mantin, Kg Attap, Mantin Dalam, Bandar Baru Nilai |
| P.128 Seremban | N.11 Lobak | 6 | Kg Lobak, Ulu Temiang, Jalan Manickavasagam, Lobak, Taman Templer, Kampong Nee Yan |
| P.128 Seremban | N.12 Temiang | 5 | Taman Temiang Jaya, Temiang, Limbok, Jalan Yazid Ahmad, Jalan Han Hui Foong |
| P.128 Seremban | N.13 Sikamat | 5 | Taman Paroi Jaya, Sikamat, Taman Jujur, Jalan Sikamat, Taman Desa Rhu |
| P.128 Seremban | N.14 Ampangan | 6 | Medan Rahang, Ampangan, Kampong Gedong Lalang, Taman Datuk Shahbandar, Dusun Nyior, Kampong Jiboi |
| P.129 Kuala Pilah | N.15 Juasseh | 11 | Kampong Tengkek, Kampong Tapak, Kampong Sungai Jelutong, Kampong Padang Lebar, Kampong Terentang, Juasseh Tengah, Bukit Gelugor, Kampong Terusan, Pekan Juasseh, Pelangai, Kampong Gentam |
| P.129 Kuala Pilah | N.16 Seri Menanti | 13 | Kampong Langkap, Kampong Ulu Bendol, Terachi, Kampong Talang, Kampong Gemetir, Kampong Ibol, Kampong Tengah, Tanjong Ipoh, Kampung Gamin, Kampong Buyau, Sri Menanti, Kampung Sikai, Gunong Pasir |
| P.129 Kuala Pilah | N.17 Senaling | 9 | Temaris, FELDA Kepis, Rembang Panas, Kampong Sungai Dua, Kampong Kuala Dioh, Sawah Lebar, Kampong Dioh, Tebat Kering, Senaling |
| P.129 Kuala Pilah | N.18 Pilah | 12 | Ampang Tinggi, Kampong Parit, Pekan Lama, Taman Bunga, Kampong Gemuroh, Kampong Jawa, Jalan Yam Tuan, Tengku Besar, Bukit Temensu, Batang Pilah, Kampong Gachong, Seri Pilah |
| P.129 Kuala Pilah | N.19 Johol | 10 | Kampong Kepis, Malan Baru, Dangi, Kampung Selaru, Inas, Kampong Padang Jual, Pekan Johol, Kuala Johol, Kampung Nuri, Ayer Mawang |
| P.130 Rasah | N.20 Labu | 6 | Jijan, Kampong Kondok, Tiroi, Labu, Labu Jaya, Kampung Gadong Jaya |
| P.130 Rasah | N.21 Bukit Kepayang | 10 | Bukit Kepayang, Taman Permai, Jalan Kong Sang, Jalan Dato Bandar Tunggal, Jalan Yam Tuan, Jalan Lee Sam, Jalan Tuanku Munawir, Bukit Tembok, Taman Bukit Kaya, Seremban 2 |
| P.130 Rasah | N.22 Rahang | 9 | Rahang, Rahang Timor, Pekan Rahang, Pekan Rasah, Kampong Bahru Rasah, Taman Bukit Chedang, Kampong Pondok, Jalan Tok Ungku, Kampong Datuk Mansor |
| P.130 Rasah | N.23 Mambau | 5 | Desa Sri Mambau, Taman Sungai Ujong, Pekan Mambau, Rasah Jaya, Bukit Blossom |
| P.130 Rasah | N.24 Seremban Jaya | 5 | Taman Rahang, Taman Seremban, Kampong Bahru Rahang, Senawang, Taman Seremban Jaya |
| P.131 Rembau | N.25 Paroi | 10 | Paroi, Taman Satria, Taman Tuanku Jaafar, Taman Sri Permata, Kombok, Taman Tasik Jaya, Bukit Seri Senawang, Taman Kobena, Senawang Jaya, Taman Marida |
| P.131 Rembau | N.26 Chembong | 12 | Ulu Pedas, Sepri, Kampong Rendah, Kampong Senama Ulu, Chembong, Pekan Pedas, Kampong Pedas Tengah, Pekan Rembau, Batu Hampar, Mampong, Pilin, Kundor |
| P.131 Rembau | N.27 Rantau | 12 | Kampong Sendayan, Sendayan, Taman Kelab Tuanku, Kampong Mambau, Kampong Bemban, Kuala Sawah, Kampong Sri Lalang, Kampong Sega, Pekan Sagga, Rantau, Linsum, Kampong Siliau |
| P.131 Rembau | N.28 Kota | 15 | Kampong Batu, Selemak, Kampong Bongek, Kampong Chengkau Ulu, Kampong Gadong, Kampong Kendong, Kota, Semerbok, Kampong Sawah Raja, Titian Bintangor, Astana Raja, Legong Ulu, Pekan Chengkau, Kampong Penajis, Kampong Pulau Mampat |
| P.132 Port Dickson | N.29 Chuah | 5 | Tanah Merah, Kampong Pachitan, Bukit Pelandok, Sungai Nipah, Chuah |
| P.132 Port Dickson | N.30 Lukut | 7 | Kampong Jimah Baru, Bandar Spring Hill, Taman Indah Jaya, Kuala Lukut, Lukut, Sri Parit, Tanjong Gemok |
| P.132 Port Dickson | N.31 Bagan Pinang | 8 | Ladang Atherton, Pekan Siliau, Ladang Bradwall, Sua Betong, Sunggala, Kampong Bagan Pinang, Si Rusa, Telok Kemang |
| P.132 Port Dickson | N.32 Linggi | 8 | Ayer Kuning, Linggi, Kampong Pengkalan Durian, Pengkalan Kempas, Ladang Sengkang, Kampong Sungai Raya, Pasir Panjang, Bandar Baru Sunggala |
| P.132 Port Dickson | N.33 Sri Tanjung | 4 | Kampong Paya, Kampong Arab, Kampong Chokra, Pekan Port Dickson |
| P.133 Tampin | N.34 Gemas | 7 | FELDA Jelai 1 & 3, Pasir Besar, FELDA Pasir Besar, Kampong Ladang, Pekan Gemas, Taman Sentosa, FELDA Jelai 2 & 4 |
| P.133 Tampin | N.35 Gemencheh | 15 | Sungai Kelamah, Gemencheh Lama, Gemencheh Bahru, Kampong Bahru Gedok, Gedok, Ayer Kuning Selatan, Bukit Jalor, Kampong Tengah, Kampong Mantai, Ladang Regent, Pekan Batang Melaka, Bukit Rotan Utara, Bukit Rokan, Kampong Rokan, Kampong Sungai Jerneh |
| P.133 Tampin | N.36 Repah | 8 | Repah, Kampong Bahru Tampin, Pekan Tampin, Kampong Batu Belang, Keru, Tebong, Kampong Asahan, Taman Indah |

== Malacca ==
| Federal constituency | State constituency | Polling districts | |
|---|---|---|---|
| P.134 Masjid Tanah | N.01 Kuala Linggi | 7 | Tanjung Dahan, Sungai Baru Hilir, Kampung Tengah, Permatang, Kuala Sungai Baru, Paya Mengkuang, Telok Gong |
| P.134 Masjid Tanah | N.02 Tanjung Bidara | 5 | Kampung Pulau, Lubok Redan, Sungai Baru Tengah, Pengkalan Balak, Pasir Gembor |
| P.134 Masjid Tanah | N.03 Ayer Limau | 7 | Sungai Siput, Sungai Jerneh, Ramuan China Kechil, FELCRA Ramuan China Kechil, Ramuan China Besar, Kampung Lekok, Kampung Pinang |
| P.134 Masjid Tanah | N.04 Lendu | 4 | Pekan Masjid Tanah, Durian Daun, Sungai Baru Hulu, Pekan Lendu |
| P.134 Masjid Tanah | N.05 Taboh Naning | 7 | Cherana Puteh, Simpang Empat, Berisu, Sungai Buloh, Batang Melekek, Rantau Panjang, Ayer Paabas |
| P.135 Alor Gajah | N.06 Rembia | 7 | Pekan Alor Gajah, Kelemak, Jelatang, Kampung Tebat, Sungai Petai, Pekan Rembia, Jeram |
| P.135 Alor Gajah | N.07 Gadek | 10 | Bukit Sebang, Pekan Pulau Sebang, Kuala Ina, Arongan, Tanjung Rimau, Padang Sebang, Paya Datuk, Pegoh, Ganun, Pekan Gadek |
| P.135 Alor Gajah | N.08 Machap Jaya | 8 | Tebong, FELDA Hutan Percha, Kemuning, Solok Menggong, Machap Baru, Ayer Pasir, Machap Umbor, Melaka Pindah |
| P.135 Alor Gajah | N.09 Durian Tunggal | 5 | Parit Melana, Belimbing Dalam, Bukit Tambun, Pekan Durian Tunggal, Gangsa |
| P.135 Alor Gajah | N.10 Asahan | 11 | Simpang Tebong, Pekan Selandar, Bukit Sedanan, Batang Melaka, Jus, Bukit Senggeh, Pekan Nyalas, FELDA Bukit Senggeh, Pondok Batang, Ladang Bukit Asahan, Pekan Asahan |
| P.136 Tangga Batu | N.11 Sungai Udang | 4 | Bukit Terendak, Pekan Sungai Udang, Paya Rumput Jaya, Bertam Hulu |
| P.136 Tangga Batu | N.12 Pantai Kundor | 7 | Ayer Salak, Paya Luboh, Pantai Puteri, Kampung Gelam, Pengkalan Perigi, Pengkalan Lanjut, Sungai Lereh |
| P.136 Tangga Batu | N.13 Paya Rumput | 6 | Hujong Padang, Kerubong, Pantai Cheng, Cheng Perdana, Cheng, Tanjung Minyak |
| P.136 Tangga Batu | N.14 Kelebang | 7 | Seberang Gajah, Bukit Rambai, Kampung Pinang, Kelebang Besar, Pulau Gadong, Pekan Kelebang Besar, Kelebang Kechil |
| P.137 Hang Tuah Jaya | N.15 Pengkalan Batu | 9 | Bachang Baru, Pasir Puteh, Pengkalan Batu, Rumpun Bahagia, Peringgit, Peringgit Jaya, Bukit Palah, Seri Siantan, Bukit Piatu |
| P.137 Hang Tuah Jaya | N.16 Ayer Keroh | 8 | Sungai Putat, Kampung Ayer Keroh, Ayer Keroh Heights, Taman Kerjasama, Taman Bukit Melaka, Taman Bunga Raya, Taman Muzaffar Shah, Kampung Tun Razak |
| P.137 Hang Tuah Jaya | N.17 Bukit Katil | 8 | Bukit Beruang, Padang Jambu, Bukit Baru Dalam, Paya Ikan, Bukit Pulau, Kampungku Sayang, Taman Tun Rahah, Kampung Bukit Katil |
| P.137 Hang Tuah Jaya | N.18 Ayer Molek | 7 | Pengkalan Minyak, Tambak Paya, Kg Ayer Molek, Bukit Lintang, Kandang, Tiang Dua, Paya Dalam |
| P.138 Kota Melaka | N.19 Kesidang | 9 | Taman Merdeka, Batu Berendam, Taman Melaka Baru, Malim Jaya, Bertam, Taman Asean, Kampung Padang, Bakar Batu, Limbongan |
| P.138 Kota Melaka | N.20 Kota Laksamana | 15 | Kesidang Indah, Tun Perak, Kampung Enam, Pengkalan Rama Pantai, Kenanga Seksyen 1, Kenanga Seksyen 2, Kenanga Seksyen 3, Tengkera Pantai, Tengkera, Kubu, Kampung Morten, Pengkalan Rama, Kampung Hulu, Kampung Belanda, Taman Kota Laksamana |
| P.138 Kota Melaka | N.21 Duyong | 6 | Pengkalan Rama Tengah, Durian Daun, Kg Padang Semabok, Semabok, Perigi Hang Tuah, Seri Duyong |
| P.138 Kota Melaka | N.22 Bandar Hilir | 10 | Bunga Raya, Bukit China, Bukit Gedong, Bandar Kaba, Bandar Hilir Tengah, Lorong Panjang, Kg Bandar Hilir, Melaka Raya, Perkampungan Portugis, Ujong Pasir Pantai |
| P.138 Kota Melaka | N.23 Telok Mas | 6 | Ujong Pasir Darat, Kampung Ujong Pasir, Padang Temu, Alai, Kg Telok Mas, Pernu |
| P.139 Jasin | N.24 Bemban | 9 | Pondok Kempas, Ayer Kangkong, Kesang Tua, Kesang Jaya, Ayer Barok, Taman Maju, Ayer Panas, Seri Bemban, Tehel |
| P.139 Jasin | N.25 Rim | 10 | Kemendor, Seri Kesang, Kelubi, Kg Rim, Bukit Katong, Ladang Diamond, Simpang Bekoh, Chohong, Chinchin, Simpang Kerayong |
| P.139 Jasin | N.26 Serkam | 7 | Bukit Tembakau, Umbai, Anjung Batu, Serkam Darat, Pulai, Serkam Pantai, Tedong |
| P.139 Jasin | N.27 Merlimau | 7 | Ayer Merbau, Jasin Lalang, Merlimau Utara, Merlimau Pasir, Sempang, Pengkalan Samak, Permatang Serai |
| P.139 Jasin | N.28 Sungai Rambai | 5 | Seri Mendapat, Batu Gajah, Sebatu, Parit Putat, Parit Perawas |

== Johor ==
| Federal constituency | State constituency | Polling districts | |
|---|---|---|---|
| P.140 Segamat | N.01 Buloh Kasap | 17 | Mensudot Lama, Balai Badang, Palong Timor, Sepang Loi, Mensudot Pindah, Awat, Pekan Gemas Bahru, Gomali, Tambang, Paya Lang, Ladang Sungai Muar, Kuala Paya, Bandar Buloh Kasap Utara, Bandar Buloh Kasap Selatan, Buloh Kasap, Gelang Chinchin, Sepinang |
| P.140 Segamat | N.02 Jementah | 26 | Gemas Baru, Fortrose, Sungai Senarut, Bandar Batu Anam, Batu Anam, Bandan, Welch, Paya Jakas, Bandar Jementah Barat, Bandar Jementah Timor, Bandar Jementah Tengah, Bandar Jementah Selatan, Jementah, Sungai Siput, Kampong Bukit Tunggal, Tebing Tinggi, Gemereh, Berata, Jalan Kolam Air, Sungai Kapeh, Pasar, Bandar, Jalan Gemereh, Genuang, Genuang Selatan, Kampong Abdullah Utara |
| P.141 Sekijang | N.03 Pemanis | 13 | Pemanis 1, Pemanis 2, Bumbun, Sulir, Pekan Jabi, Tahang Rimau, Jalan Buloh Kasap, Kampong Mengkudu, Kampong Tengah, FELDA Medoi, Kampong Jawa, Gubah, Kampong Abdullah Selatan |
| P.141 Sekijang | N.04 Kemelah | 13 | Segamat Baru, Ladang Segamat, FELDA Kemelah, Redong, Sekijang, Chuan Moh San, Kampong Melayu Raya, Bukit Siput, Pekan Bukit Siput Utara, Paya Pulai, Pogoh, Ladang Labis Bahru, Pekan Bukit Siput Selatan |
| P.142 Labis | N.05 Tenang | 12 | Kampong Redong, Pekan Ayer Panas, Ladang Labis Utara, Bandar Labis Timor, Bandar Labis Tengah, Labis, FELDA Tenang, Sawah Bahru, Tenang Station, Ladang Bukit Dato, Chemplak Barat, Chemplak |
| P.142 Labis | N.06 Bekok | 22 | Bandar Labis Selatan, Bandar Labis Barat, Sungai Karas, Kampong Panchajaya, Kampong Kudong, Ladang Kempas, Kampong Bahru Bekok Barat, Kampong Bahru Bekok Tengah, Kampong Bahru Bekok Timor, Bandar Bekok, Ladang Getah Eldred Bekok, Johor Labis ‘A’, Chaah Barat, Bandar Chaah Utara, Bandar Chaah Tengah, Bandar Chaah Selatan, Kampong Jawa Chaah, Chaah Timor, Chan Wing, Ladang Gerchang, Desa Temu Jodoh, Perling |
| P.143 Pagoh | N.07 Bukit Kepong | 27 | Bandar Bukit Kepong, FELCRA Paya Kepar, Ma'okil, Bukit Kepong, Lenga Utara, Lenga Selatan, Kampong Bahru, Lenga, Kampong Gombang, Liang Batu, Lenga Road, Pagoh, Bandar Pagoh Utara, Bandar Pagoh Selatan, Paya Redan, Kampong Teratai, Sri Ledang, FELDA Sri Jaya, Durian Chondong, Kundang Ulu, Ladang Serampang, Parit Raja, Bandar Grisek Timor, Grisek, Kampong Kundang Ulu, Ladang Nordanal, Kebun Bahru |
| P.143 Pagoh | N.08 Bukit Pasir | 20 | Samasih, Kampong Raja, Panchor, Bandar Panchor, Kampong Jawa, Jorak, Tanjong Selabu, Pergam, Temiang, Sungai Terap, Sungai Raya, Kampong Tengah, Permatang Pasir, Pekan Bukit Pasir Barat, Pekan Bukit Pasir Utara, Pekan Bukit Pasir Selatan, Bukit Pasir, Ladang Craigielea, Panjang Sari, Bukit Treh |
| P.144 Ledang | N.09 Gambir | 15 | Kampong Babok, Sengkang, Sawah Ring, Bukit Gambir, Parit Kassan, Simpang Lima, Parit Bilah, Pekan Bukit Gambir Barat, Pekan Bukit Gambir Timor, Pekan Bukit Gambir Utara, Ladang Sagil, Bandar Sagil Luar, Sagil, Kampong Sri Jaya, Parit Zing |
| P.144 Ledang | N.10 Tangkak | 13 | Asahan Relau, Kampong Bahru Bekoh, Payamas, Jalan Sialang, Bandar Tangkak Utara, Bandar Tangkak Timor, Bandar Tangkak Selatan, Bandar Tangkak Barat, Pengkalan Besar, Kampong Solok, Bukit Banjar, Bandar Tangkak, Taman Tangkak Jaya |
| P.144 Ledang | N.11 Serom | 21 | Blemang, Paya Kepong, Telok Rimba, Pekan Bukit Kangkar, Bukit Kangkar, Serom Darat, Serom Lima, Serom Lapan, Serom Baroh, Bandar Serom, Sungai Mati, Kesang Tasek, Bandar Sungai Mati, Rawang, Kampong Pantai Layang, Parit Bunga, Kesang, Parit Pajar, Tanjong Gading, Tanjong Agas Utara, Tanjong Agas Selatan |
| P.145 Bakri | N.12 Bentayan | 13 | Jalan Ismail, Parit Beting, Sabak Awor, Parit Tiram, Bentayan, Pasar, Bandar Timor, Jalan Daud Timor, Jalan Daud Barat, Taman Orkid, Sungai Abong Tengah, Sungai Abong Baru, Bandar Barat |
| P.145 Bakri | N.13 Simpang Jeram | 11 | Jalan Sakeh, Temenggong Ahmad Dalam, Sungai Abong, Jalan Haji Abdullah, Haji Abdullah Selatan, Jeram Tengah, Bukit Batu, Kampong Ulu, Simpang Jeram, Sri Tanjong, Kampong Sungai Abong |
| P.145 Bakri | N.14 Bukit Naning | 10 | Pekan Bukit Bakri Timor, Pekan Bukit Bakri Barat, Bakri, Parit Zain, Ayer Manis, Bukit Naning, Ayer Hitam, Kampong Parit Tengah, Parit No 5, Parit No 3 |
| P.146 Muar | N.15 Maharani | 14 | Maharani, Tanjong, Tanjong Selatan, Jalan Khalidi, Temenggong Ahmad Selatan, Parit Prupok Timor, Parit Prupok Barat, Parit Keroma, Parit Raja, Parit Bakar Darat, Parit Bakar, Parit Unas, Parit Pinang Seribu, Parit Samsu |
| P.146 Muar | N.16 Sungai Balang | 19 | Parit Kassim, Bukit Mor, Parit Nawee, Bandar Parit Jawa Utara, Bandar Parit Jawa Selatan, Parit Jawa, Parit Tengah, Parit Jamil Darat, Parit Pechah, Sri Menanti, Sungai Sudah, Sungai Balang, Sungai Balang Besar, Sungai Balang Darat, Sarang Buaya Darat, Parit Yusof, Sarang Buaya Laut, Kampong Parit Bulat, Parit Shafiee |
| P.147 Parit Sulong | N.17 Semerah | 26 | Parit Nibong Darat, Batu Puteh, Separap, Kampong Batu Puteh, Semerah, Bandar Semerah, Lubok, Parit Kuda, Parit Besar, Gambut, Bagan, Kampong Bintang, Mampan, Simpang Lima, Sungai Kajang, Peserai, Shahbandar, Jalan Jenang, Pasar, Jalan Engan, Panchoran Ayer, Kampong Pantai Barat, Kampong Pantai Timor, Kampong Pantai, Parit Maimon, Parit Puasa |
| P.147 Parit Sulong | N.18 Sri Medan | 17 | Parit Gantong, Parit Jayos, Parit Dayong, Kampong Sri Pasir, Sri Medan Barat, Parit Warijo, Parit Karjan, Parit Sulong, Bandar Parit Sulong, Sentang Batu, Parit Othman, Parit Haji Siraj, Parit Betong, Parit Abdul Rahman, Bandar Sri Medan, Sri Medan Timor, Air Putih |
| P.148 Ayer Hitam | N.19 Yong Peng | 13 | Sri Sepakat, Lam Lee, Ladang Chaah, Ladang Yong Peng Bhg 'B', Kangkar Bahru, Yong Peng Utara, Bandar Yong Peng Utara, Bandar Yong Peng Tengah, Bandar Yong Peng Selatan, Yong Peng Selatan, Ladang Yong Peng, Kampong Manong, Taman Jelita |
| P.148 Ayer Hitam | N.20 Semarang | 14 | Parit Haji Yusof, Sri Mendapat, Kampong Haji Ghaffar, Asam Bubok, Sungai Rambot, Ayer Hitam Selatan, Ayer Hitam Utara, Bandar Ayer Hitam Barat, Bandar Ayer Hitam Timor, Parit Semarang, Parit Quarry, Sabak Uni, Parit Haji Ali, Parit Simpang Tengah |
| P.149 Sri Gading | N.21 Parit Yaani | 13 | Parit Jambi, Parit Selulun, Bukit Rahmat, Tongkang Pechah, Bandar Tongkang Pechah, Parit Buloh, Pekan Parit Yaani, Kampong Bahru Parit Yaani, Kampong Bahru, Parit Yob, Broleh Utara, Broleh Tengah, Bukit Pasir Timor |
| P.149 Sri Gading | N.22 Parit Raja | 17 | Taman Sri Saga, Broleh Selatan, Batu Enam, Sri Gading, Bandar Sri Gading, Tanjong Sembrong, Bandar Parit Raja Utara, Bandar Parit Raja Selatan, Pintas Puding, Parit Jelutong, Pintas Raya, Sri Gading Estate, Parit Kampong Baru, Parit Sri Pandan, Parit Lapis Sempadan, Parit Raja, Parit Sri Menanti |
| P.150 Batu Pahat | N.23 Penggaram | 18 | Parit Bilal, Linau, Bakau Chondong, Bukit Pasir, Bakau Chondong Barat, Kampong Kenangan Dato' Onn, Gunong Soga, Kampong Merdeka Timor, Kampong Merdeka Barat, Jalan Zabedah Barat, Jalan Abu Bakar, Jalan Zabedah Timor, Simpang Rantai, Bentara Luar, Bukit Bendera, Taman Soga, Kampung Istana, Taman Murni |
| P.150 Batu Pahat | N.24 Senggarang | 15 | Minyak Beku, Petani Kechik, Banang, Sungai Ayam, Sungai Suloh, Koris, Parit Tariman, Parit Kadir, Parit Kemang, Sungai Lurus, Bandar Senggarang Barat, Bandar Senggarang Timor, Senggarang, Kampong Bahru, Taman Senggarang |
| P.150 Batu Pahat | N.25 Rengit | 11 | Rejo Sari, Perpat, Sri Ladang, Sri Merlong, Belahan Tampok, Sungai Merlong, Sungai Kluang, Bandar Rengit Selatan, Bandar Rengit Utara, Rengit, Punggor |
| P.151 Simpang Renggam | N.26 Machap | 12 | Sri Desa, Rancangan FELDA Ayer Hitam, Sri Lalang, Pekan Machap, Machap, Kampong Ulu Benut, Bandar Simpang Renggam Utara, Bandar Simpang Renggam Timor, Simpang Renggam, FELCRA Simpang Renggam, Jalan Benut, Ladang Nenas |
| P.151 Simpang Renggam | N.27 Layang-Layang | 14 | Ladang Tun Dr. Ismail, Kampong Chokro, Kampong Sahari, Senda, Bandar Renggam, Kebun Bahru, Sembrong, Chemara, Layang–Layang, Bandar Layang-Layang Selatan, Bandar Layang-Layang Utara, Renggam, Ladang Southern Malay, FELDA Layang–Layang |
| P.152 Kluang | N.28 Mengkibol | 22 | Ladang Coronation, Pekan Sri Lalang Barat, Pekan Sri Lalang Timor, Ladang Mengkibol, Mengkibol Barat, Mengkibol Timor, Taman Kurnia, Bakar Sampah, Lambak, Yap Tau Sah, Yap Tau Sah Timor, Jalan Mersing, Jalan Johor Tenggara, Kluang Layang, Ladang Lambak, Ladang Elaeis, Kampung Gunung Lambak, Taman Megah, Kampong Paya Timor, Kampong Paya Barat, Kampong Melayu Timor, Ladang Bukit Benut |
| P.152 Kluang | N.29 Mahkota | 18 | Padang Tembak, Kampong Melayu Timor II, Kampung Tengah, Kampong Melayu I, Kampong Melayu II, Taman Lian Seng, Haji Manan, Mesjid Lama, Bandar Tengah, Taman Ilham, Dorset, Taman Berlian, Jalan Hospital, Taman Kerjasama, Kampung Baru, Taman Suria, Indah Jaya, Sri Tengah |
| P.153 Sembrong | N.30 Paloh | 19 | Klebang, Kampong Melayu Paloh, Ladang Paloh, Paloh, Bandar Paloh Utara, Bandar Paloh Selatan, Kampong Muhibbah, Kali Malaya, Bukit Paloh, Ladang Landak, Ladang Kekayaan, Chamek, Consolidated Eastern Plantations, Tereh Selatan, Pengkalan Tereh, Ladang Pamol, Pekan Kampong Gajah, Kampong Gajah, FELDA Kahang Barat |
| P.153 Sembrong | N.31 Kahang | 10 | Kangkar Kahang Timor, Kangkar Kahang Barat, Kahang, FELDA Kahang Timor, FELDA Ulu Dengar, Sri Lambak, Sungai Sayong, FELDA Bukit Tongkat, FELDA Ulu Belitong, FELDA Ulu Pengeli |
| P.154 Mersing | N.32 Endau | 20 | Padang Endau, Bandar Endau Utara, Bandar Endau Selatan, Kampung Hubong, Kampung Hubong Barat, Rancangan FELDA Endau, Triang, Penyabong, Tanjong Resang, Ayer Papan, Tanjong Genting, Mersing Kanan, Jalan Endau, Jalan Abdullah, Kampong Tengah, Sawah Dato', Tenglu, Tanah Abang, Kampong Punan, Kampong Peta |
| P.154 Mersing | N.33 Tenggaroh | 24 | Bandar Utara, Jalan Jamaluang, FELDA Nitar 2, FELDA Nitar 1, Pengkalan Batu, Jalan Ismail, Pejabat Kerajaan, Pekan Mersing Kechil, Sri Pantai, Bandar Jamaluang Timor, Jamaluang Timor, Jamaluang, RISDA Sungai Ambat, FELDA Tenggaroh 5, FELDA Tenggaroh 3, FELDA Tenggaroh 6, FELDA Tenggaroh 4, FELDA Tenggaroh 2, FELDA Tenggaroh 1, Pulau Sibu, Pulau Tinggi, Pulau Besar, Pulau Aur, Pulau Pemanggil |
| P.155 Tenggara | N.34 Panti | 13 | Bandar Tenggara Utara, FELDA Pengeli Timor, Sungai Sibol, Linggiu, Ulu Sungai Johor, Pelepah Valley, Bukit Lintang, Kampong Lukut, Kota Tinggi Utara, Bandar Tenggara Selatan, Kota Jaya Utara, Kota Jaya Selatan, Kampong Kelantan |
| P.155 Tenggara | N.35 Pasir Raja | 13 | FELDA Sungai Sayong, FELDA Bukit Besar, FELDA Pasir Raja, FELDA Bukit Ramun, Sungai Telor, Sungai Johor, Sungai Kemang Selatan, Jalan Besar, Jalan Johor, Kota Tinggi Selatan, Ladang R.E.M., Jalan Kota Tinggi, Kampung Baru Sungai Redan |
| P.156 Kota Tinggi | N.36 Sedili | 14 | Sungai Ara, Tunjuk Laut, Tenggaroh Selatan, Sedili Pantai, Sedili Besar, Sedili Tengah, Sedili Darat, Mawai, Aping Barat, Aping Timor, Sedili Kechil, Bukit Easter, Wah Hah I, Wah Hah II |
| P.156 Kota Tinggi | N.37 Johor Lama | 16 | Lok Heng Barat, Lok Heng Timur, Lok Heng Selatan, Kota Kechil Timor, Kota Kechil Barat, Bukit Kerajaan, Jalan Mawai, Tembioh, Kampong Makam, FELDA Pasak, Air Tawar 3, Air Tawar 2, Panchor, Johor Lama, Pekan Telok Sengat, Telok Sengat |
| P.157 Pengerang | N.38 Penawar | 10 | Air Tawar 1, Air Tawar 4, Papan Timor, Penawar, Sungai Mas, Bandar Mas, Air Tawar 5, Semenchu, Sungai Layau, Tanjong Buai |
| P.157 Pengerang | N.39 Tanjung Surat | 15 | Tanjong Surat, Tanjong Serindit, Adela, Bukit Tunggal, Sening, Bukit Keledang, Ladang Santi, Kampong Pasir Gogok, Pengerang, Kampong Jawa, Kampong Sungai Kapal, Lepau, Sungai Rengit, Pekan Sungai Rengit, Telok Ramunia |
| P.158 Tebrau | N.40 Tiram | 24 | Ulu Tiram Barat, Bandar Ulu Tiram Barat, Bandar Ulu Tiram Tengah, Bandar Ulu Tiram Utara, Bandar Ulu Tiram Selatan, Ara Cemerlang, Ulu Tiram Timor, Nam Heng, Sungai Tiram, Kong Kong, Kampung Cahaya Baru, Kota Masai, Kota Delima, Tanjong Langsat, Tanjong Kopok, Pasir Puteh, Taman Pasir Puteh, Desa Jaya, Cahaya Masai, Lembah Ehsan, Lanjut Cemerlang, Cemerlang Tropika, Kampung Sentosa, Kota Pulasan |
| P.158 Tebrau | N.41 Puteri Wangsa | 20 | FELDA Ulu Tebrau, Maju Jaya, Nipah Delima, Puteri Wangsa 1, Mount Austin, Bertam Delima, Pekan Pandan, Kangkar Tebrau Baru, Kangkar Tebrau, Ladang Tebrau, Taman Gembira, Bukit Jaya, Rumbia Daya, Nibong Daya, Puteri Wangsa 2, Pelangi Gaya, Pinang Sagu, Setia Enau, Bukit Mutiara, Desa Tebrau |
| P.159 Pasir Gudang | N.42 Johor Jaya | 19 | Sri Amar, Belantik, Pandan, Taman Molek, Johor Jaya Barat, Johor Jaya Selatan, Johor Jaya Timor, Johor Jaya Tengah, Johor Jaya Utara, Bandar Plentong Utara, Bandar Plentong Selatan, Taman Saujana, Plentong, Masai, Teratai, Keembong, Seri Alam, Molek Harmoni, Tasek Seri Alam |
| P.159 Pasir Gudang | N.43 Permas | 22 | Permas, Permas Jaya, Senibong, Taman Kota Puteri, Kampong Telok Jawa, Rinting Cendana, Taman Mawar, Pasir Gudang, Pelabuhan Pasir Gudang, Taman Air Biru, Rumah Pangsa PKENJ, Permas 2, Taman Megah Ria, Rinting Meranti, Rinting Balau, Nusa Scientex, Taman Bukit Dahlia, Bandar Baru Permas Jaya, Kampong Plentong Baru, Bandar Masai Utara, Bandar Masai Tengah, Bandar Masai Selatan |
| P.160 Johor Bahru | N.44 Larkin | 23 | Bandar Baru Uda, Uda Malinja, Jalan Datin Halimah, Kampong Ungku Mohsin, Kampong Melayu Majedee I, Kampong Melayu Majedee II, Stulang Baru, Sepakat, Taman Baru, Rumah Pangsa Larkin, Larkin Jaya, Larkin, Taman Majedee, Taman Kebun Teh, Taman Melodies, Taman Abad, Abad Jaya 1, Taman Skudai Kanan, Kampong Larkin Jaya, Abad Jaya 2, Uda Mahsuri, Ulu Ayer Molek, Kebun Teh |
| P.160 Johor Bahru | N.45 Stulang | 17 | Majedee Bahru, Sulaiman Menteri, Setanggi, Sentosa, Sri Tebrau (1), Bakar Batu, Pelangi, Taman Maju Jaya, Kampong Wadi Hana, Bukit Senyum, Sri Pelangi, Stulang, Taman Sri Setia, Sri Tebrau (2), Lumba Kuda, Bukit Chagar, Desa Majidi |
| P.161 Pulai | N.46 Perling | 26 | Belibis Perling, Sri Jaya, Kampong Pasir, Pengkalan Rinting, Skudai Kiri, Sungai Danga, Taman Sutera, Bukit Serene, Tarom, Nong Chik, Tambatan, Gertak Merah, Kampong Bahru, Yahya Awal, Ngee Heng, Ayer Molek, Kampong Pahang, Bandar, Camar Perling, Pekaka Perling, Rawa Perling, Bukit Indah, Nusa Indah, Tampoi Indah, Simbang Perling, Uda Bestari |
| P.161 Pulai | N.47 Kempas | 14 | Kempas, Permatang, Lembah Kempas, Jalan Tampoi, Denai, Taman Siantan, Taman Johor, Taman Cempaka, Taman Dahlia, Taman Kobena, Desa Rahmat, Pekan Tampoi, Bukit Mewah, Bukit Kempas |
| P.162 Iskandar Puteri | N.48 Skudai | 21 | Jaya Mas, Selesa Jaya, Sri Sinding, Impian Emas, Sri Skudai, Bandar Skudai Barat, Bandar Skudai Tengah, Bandar Skudai Timor, Hang Tuah, Laksamana TUTA, Nakhoda TUTA, Flat Perkasa 'A' TUTA, Taman Damai Jaya, Desa Skudai, Hang Jebat, Perwira TUTA, Hulubalang TUTA, Skudai Utara, Flat Perkasa 'B' TUTA, Taman Jaya, Bukit Impian |
| P.162 Iskandar Puteri | N.49 Kota Iskandar | 24 | Kangkar Pulai, Pertanian, Kebangsaan, Lima Kedai, Gelang Patah Utara, Kampong Pulai, Sungai Melayu, Tebing Runtoh, Kampong Pendas, Gelang Patah Selatan, Tiram Duku, Tanjong Kupang, Kampong Pok Besar, Tanjong Adang, Penyiaran, Kemuliaan, Perubatan, Pulai Indah, Pulai Utama, Sri Pulai Perdana, Mutiara Rini, Pulai, Sri Pulai, Teratai |
| P.163 Kulai | N.50 Bukit Permai | 12 | Murni Jaya, Bukit Permai, Inas, Sedenak Utara, Sedenak Selatan, Ladang Fraser, Pekan Sengkang, FELDA Taib Andak, Ladang Swee Lam, Ladang Kelan, Bandar Kulai Utara, Kampong Pertanian |
| P.163 Kulai | N.51 Bukit Batu | 15 | Ulu Choh, Bandar Ulu Choh, Kampong Rahmat, Bukit Batu, Ayer Manis, FELDA Bukit Batu, Ayer Bemban, Midland Kulai Young, Pekan Kelapa Sawit Barat, Pekan Kelapa Sawit Tengah, Pekan Kelapa Sawit Timor, Kampong Sri Paya, Kota Kulai, Taman Permai, Taman Puteri |
| P.163 Kulai | N.52 Senai | 17 | UTM, Saleng, Bandar Senai Utara, Bandar Senai Tengah, Bandar Senai Selatan, Taman Muhibbah, Taman Aman, Dawani, Senai Baru, Seelong, Bandar Kulai Barat, Bandar Kulai Tengah, Bandar Kulai Timor, Kulai, Ladang Kulai Besar, Lengkongan, Taman Selatan |
| P.164 Pontian | N.53 Benut | 15 | Lubok Sipat, Permatang Sepam, Parit Betak, Permatang Duku, Parit Mansor, Parit Ismail, Sri Jawa, Parit Satu, Sanglang, Simpang Jawa, Benut, Bandar Benut Utara, Bandar Benut Selatan, Parit Abdul Rahman, Tampok |
| P.164 Pontian | N.54 Pulai Sebatang | 21 | Kampong Parit Kahar, Parit Keroma, Ayer Baloi, Bandar Ayer Baloi Selatan, Bandar Ayer Baloi Utara, Parit Panjang, Kampong Parit Haji Karim, Parit Sikom, Kampong Jawa, Pulai Sebatang, Api–Api, Sungai Trus, Pontian Besar Kiri, Jalan Alsagoff, Pantai Bandar Pontian, Pegawai, Jalan Taib, Bakek, Parit Semerah, Parit Mesjid, Parit Mesjid Darat |
| P.165 Tanjung Piai | N.55 Pekan Nanas | 11 | Parit Kudus, Tanjong Ayer Hitam, Ladang South Malaya, Melayu Raya, Kampong Lubok Sawah, Tenggayon, Pengkalan Raja Pontian, Bandar Pekan Nenas Barat, Bandar Pekan Nenas Timor, Bandar Pekan Nenas Tengah, Bandar Pekan Nenas Selatan |
| P.165 Tanjung Piai | N.56 Kukup | 16 | Jalan Rimba Terjun, Kampong Duku, Kampong Rimba Terjun, Parit Hj. Ismail, Rambah, Parit Rambai, Peradin, Telok Kerang, Penerok, Sungai Boh, Bandar Permas Kechil, Permas Kechil, Sungai Durian, Serkat, Andek Mori, Ladang Sungai Burong |

== Federal Territory of Labuan ==
| Federal constituency | Polling districts | |
|---|---|---|
| P.166 Labuan | 17 | Kubong, Layangan, Lajau, Ganggarak, Lada, Benuwa, Lapangan Terbang, Victoria Utara, Victoria Selatan, Ramsay, Rancha-Rancha, Kerupang, Kampong Batu Arang, Patau-Patau, Sungai Keling, Bukit Kalam, Tanjung Aru |

== Sabah ==
| Federal constituency | State constituency | Polling districts | |
|---|---|---|---|
| P.167 Kudat | N.01 Banggi | 14 | Limbuak, Kapitangan, Sabur, Karakit, Malawali, Balambangan, Maliu, Dagotan, Lok Agong, Sebogoh, Loktohog, Laksian, Palak, Tigabu |
| P.167 Kudat | N.02 Bengkoka | 10 | Mengkubau, Tanjung Piring, Mangkapon, Kanibongan, Pantai, Kebatasan, Penapak, Dandun, Senaja, Pandan |
| P.167 Kudat | N.03 Pitas | 10 | Telaga, Kalumpang, Salimpodon, Pitas, Liu, Malubang, Rosob, Pinggan-Pinggan, Sungai Eloi, Sanitan |
| P.167 Kudat | N.04 Tanjong Kapor | 15 | Tiga Papan, Suangpai, Pengaraban, Tanjung Kapor, Pakka, Bangau, Tamalang, Dampirit, Kudat Bandar, Milau, Landong Ayang, Loro, Tajau, Limau-Limauan, Pantai Bahagia |
| P.168 Kota Marudu | N.05 Matunggong | 25 | Sikuati, Dualog, Pinawantai, Tambuluran, Indarason, Matunggong, Nangka, Tigaman, Rampai, Lodung, Lokoton, Lajong, Tinangol, Kandawayon, Muhang, Sebayan, Lotong, Tagumamal Laut, Sampir, Teringai Laut, Bingolon, Panudahan, Narandang, Terongkongan, Pata |
| P.168 Kota Marudu | N.06 Bandau | 13 | Bintasan, Mangaris, Tagaroh, Langkon, Panaitan, Mangin, Ranau, Bongon, Ongkilan, Taritipan, Popok, Tanjung Batu, Pangapuyan |
| P.168 Kota Marudu | N.07 Tandek | 19 | Tingkalanon, Talantang, Ulu Bengkoka, Gana, Simpangan, Malangkap, Marak Parak, Salimandut, Samparita, Lingkabungan, Sonsogon Magandai, Gouton, Bombong I, Damai, Tagibang, Goshen, Timbang Batu, Sunsui, Masalog |
| P.169 Kota Belud | N.08 Pintasan | 10 | Dudar, Rampayan, Timbang, Tamau, Merbau, Pandasan, Kota Peladok, Rampayan Ulu, Pulau Mantanani, Peladok |
| P.169 Kota Belud | N.09 Tempasuk | 7 | Kagurahan, Taun Gusi, Tempasuk, Rosok, Gunding, Jawi Jawi, Labuan |
| P.169 Kota Belud | N.10 Usukan | 11 | Ambong, Kulambai, Timbang Dayang, Sembirai, Pangkalan Abai, Pompod, Kota Belud, Pirasan, Suang Punggor, Kuala Abai, Siasai |
| P.169 Kota Belud | N.11 Kadamaian | 16 | Kelawat, Kinasaraban, Tamu Darat, Piasau, Tangkurus, Lasau, Sayap, Taginambur, Narinang, Kebayau, Kiau, Gaur-Gaur, Tambulion, Nahaba, Melangkap, Kaung |
| P.170 Tuaran | N.12 Sulaman | 7 | Penimbawan, Serusup, Kindu, Indai, Batangan, Tambalang, Baru-Baru |
| P.170 Tuaran | N.13 Pantai Dalit | 7 | Tuaran Bandar, Marabahai, Mengkabong, Berungis, Gayang, Nongkolud, Telipok |
| P.170 Tuaran | N.14 Tamparuli | 11 | Tenghilan, Rani, Rungus, Rengalis, Topokon, Sawah, Tamparuli, Mengkaladoi, Gayaratau, Kilang Bata, Telibong |
| P.170 Tuaran | N.15 Kiulu | 15 | Rangalau, Kiulu, Malangang, Togop, Kelawat, Bongol, Simpangan, Taginambur, Pukak, Mantob, Pahu, Tiong Simpodon, Poring, Tomis, Tudan |
| P.171 Sepanggar | N.16 Karambunai | 6 | Karambunai, Gudon, Taman Indah Permai, Telipok Laut, Telipok Darat, Pulau Sepanggar |
| P.171 Sepanggar | N.17 Darau | 8 | Likas Baru, Likas Darat, Kampong Likas, Bangka-Bangka, Kurol Melangi, Darau, Warisan, Rampayan |
| P.171 Sepanggar | N.18 Inanam | 11 | Inanam Laut, Tobobon, Kokol, Menggatal, Pulutan, Inanam Darat, Poring-Poring, Kolam Ayer, Cenderakasih, Pekan Inanam, Bantayan |
| P.172 Kota Kinabalu | N.19 Likas | 8 | Bandar Utara, Bandar Selatan, Likas Barat, Likas, Likas Tengah, Likas Selatan, Likas Park, Dah Yeh Villa |
| P.172 Kota Kinabalu | N.20 Api-Api | 5 | Kampong Ayer, Jalan Istana, Jalan Kebajikan, Sunny Garden, Jalan Bandaran |
| P.172 Kota Kinabalu | N.21 Luyang | 9 | Jalan Rumah Sakit, Luyang, Foh Sang, Jindo, Bukit Padang, Kepayan Ridge, Taman Fu Yen, Jalan Penampang, Lido |
| P.173 Putatan | N.22 Tanjong Aru | 8 | Pulau Gaya, Sembulan Utara, Sembulan Selatan, Tanjung Aru Timor, Tanjung Aru Barat, Lapangan Terbang, Tanjung Aru Baru |
| P.173 Putatan | N.23 Petagas | 6 | Petagas, Ulu Putatan, Bandar Putatan, Papason, Tengah Padang, Tombovo |
| P.173 Putatan | N.24 Tanjung Keramat | 4 | Muhibbah, Pasir Putih, Lok Kawi, Taman Pantai Lok Kawi |
| P.174 Penampang | N.25 Kapayan | 7 | Kapayan Barat, Kapayan, Kapayan Timor, Kobusak, Nosob, Donggongon, Hungab |
| P.174 Penampang | N.26 Moyog | 13 | Buit, Guunsing, Penampang Utara, Nambazan, Kurai, Limbanak, Terian, Moyog, Inobong, Tanaki, Buayan, Longkogungan, Babagon |
| P.175 Papar | N.27 Limbahau | 9 | Dambai, Labak, Kaiduan, Gana, Ovai, Surati, Limbahau, Biau, Rampazan |
| P.175 Papar | N.28 Kawang | 6 | Pengalat, Kawang, Kinarut, Kampung Laut, Pengalat Kecil, Beringgis |
| P.175 Papar | N.29 Pantai Manis | 5 | Buang Sayang, Kuala, Kelanahan, Bandar Papar, Benoni |
| P.176 Kimanis | N.30 Bongawan | 10 | Batu Enam, Kabang, Gadong, Bongawan, Kimanis Mandahan, Kimanis Estate, Simpangan, Kuala Pus, Bongawan Estate, Seladan |
| P.176 Kimanis | N.31 Membakut | 9 | Binsulok, Pimping, Brunei, Bandau, Membakut, Lumat, Mawao, Sinuka, Dindong |
| P.177 Beaufort | N.32 Klias | 12 | Kota Klias, Malabau, Kabulu, Takuli, Limbawang, Klias Baru, Bandar Beaufort, Bingkul, Jimpangah, Halogilat, Taman Wawasan, Klias Estet |
| P.177 Beaufort | N.33 Kuala Penyu | 12 | Tenambak, Temporong, Sitombok, Palu Palu, Bundu, Melampai, Mansud, Karukan, Kilugus, Tanjung Aru, Malikai, Menumbok |
| P.178 Sipitang | N.34 Lumadan | 13 | Kabajang, Gadong, Lupak, Padas Valley, Beaufort Selatan, Lumadan, Bukau, Suasa, Padas Damit, Bankalalak, Weston, Lubok, Lingkungan |
| P.178 Sipitang | N.35 Sindumin | 17 | Banting, Sindumin, Marintaman, Bandar Sipitang, Mesapol, Usuk, Ulu Sipitang, Pantai, Melamam, Mendolong, Kelangsat, Bole, Meligan, Long Pasia, Iburu, Tanjung Pagar, Kuala Muaya |
| P.179 Ranau | N.36 Kundasang | 13 | Bundu Tuhan, Kundasang, Pinausok, Peranchangan, Pinawantai, Timbua, Nawanon, Ulu Sugut, Mangkapoh, Karagasan, Kaingaran, Kilanas, Langsat |
| P.179 Ranau | N.37 Karanaan | 17 | Paka, Pekan Ranau, Tambiau, Tagudon, Karanaan, Tungou, Randagong, Lipasu, Mohimboyon, Toboh, Ratau, Kamburongoh, Sumaang, Kimolohing, Kinarasan, Waang, Tudan |
| P.179 Ranau | N.38 Paginatan | 22 | Lohan, Bongkud, Kilimu, Libang, Kituntul, Nalapak, Suminimpod, Longut, Paus, Paginatan, Kinapulidan, Tinanom, Tampios, Miruru, Tiang, Noopung, Narawang, Marakau, Kandawayon, Sagindai, Nampasan, Matupang |
| P.180 Keningau | N.39 Tambunan | 16 | Kirokot, Patau, Kinabaan, Sensuron, Timbou, Toboh, Kaingaran, Tambunan Bandar, Lubong, Nambayan, Kuala Monsok, Geras, Tiong, Namadan, Monsorulong, Rompon |
| P.180 Keningau | N.40 Bingkor | 11 | Ranggom, Apin-Apin, Marampong, Bunga Raya, Kukuangoh, Tuntumulod, Bingkor, Baginda, Tuarid Taud, Keningau Station, Keningau Bandar |
| P.180 Keningau | N.41 Liawan | 10 | Luagan, Liawan, Patikang Laut, Sinagang, Meninipir, Bayangan, Mesjid, Limbawan, Motou, Banjar |
| P.181 Tenom | N.42 Melalap | 10 | Pamilaan, Melalap, Lagud, Kalang, Tenom Utara, Tenom Selatan, Saga, Mandalom, Pangi, Paguokon |
| P.181 Tenom | N.43 Kemabong | 12 | Chinta Mata, Sapong, Mansasoh, Enubai, Paal, Baru Jumpa, Kemabong, Tomani, Rundum, Kapulu, Katuboh, Ulu Tomani |
| P.182 Pensiangan | N.44 Tulid | 9 | Sinulihan, Mansiat, Tulid, Sungoi, Marapok, Magatang, Menawo, Simbuan, Lanas |
| P.182 Pensiangan | N.45 Sook | 12 | Malima, Sook, Barasanon, Ansip, Mambulu, Karamatoi, Dalit, Kalampun, Malaing, Lumiri, Bonor, Tiulon |
| P.182 Pensiangan | N.46 Nabawan | 15 | Nabawan, Pandewan, Ponontomon, Saliu, Sabinait, Sapulot, Tataluan, Saliku, Longongon, Pensiangan, Sibangali, Pohon Batu, Salinatan, Babalitan, Saliliran |
| P.183 Beluran | N.47 Telupid | 9 | Ulu Sapi, Lidong, Nangoh, Kiabau, Barayong, Wonod, Wonod, Telupid, Tongkungan |
| P.183 Beluran | N.48 Sugut | 21 | Jambongan Utara, Golong, Paitan Barat, Terusan Sugut, Alungai, Lingkabau Utara, Lingkabau Selatan, Sungai-Sungai, Pamol, Botitian, Malalin, Bawang, Tanjung Nipis, Lubang Buaya, Obah, Pantai Boring, Tampat, Dalamas, Nakadong, Abuan, Binsulung |
| P.183 Beluran | N.49 Labuk | 8 | Kaniogan, Tetabuan, Kolapis, Klagan, Sapi, Sungai Nangka, Pekan Beluran, Muanad |
| P.184 Libaran | N.50 Gum-Gum | 10 | Semawang, Dandulit, Gum-Gum, Sandala, Jalan Labuk, Sungai Dusun, Jaya Bakti, Pulau Libaran, Sungai Tiram, Batu 25 Jalan Labuk |
| P.184 Libaran | N.51 Sungai Manila | 6 | Sungai Batang, Sungai Manila, Batu 8 Jalan Labuk, Sungai Padas, Rancangan Lubuh, Tanjung Pisau |
| P.184 Libaran | N.52 Sungai Sibuga | 9 | Sibuga, Sungai Kayu, Taman Airport, Nunuyan, Taman Merpati, Batu Putih Baru, Tinosa, Taman Fajar, Pulau Pamaguan |
| P.185 Batu Sapi | N.53 Sekong | 7 | Jalan Sibuga, Kampung Gas, Jalan Batu Sapi, Tronglit, Sekong, Lupak Meluas, Pulau Sanghai |
| P.185 Batu Sapi | N.54 Karamunting | 6 | Cecily, Tanah Merah, Jalan Leila, Kampung Gelam, Karamunting, Bokara |
| P.186 Sandakan | N.55 Elopura | 10 | Taman Indah Jaya, Beatrice, Batu 1 Jalan Utara, Batu 2 Jalan Utara, Trig Hill, Jalan Utara, Pecky Valley, Sungai Anip, Batu 3 Jalan Utara, Batu 5 Jalan Utara |
| P.186 Sandakan | N.56 Tanjong Papat | 7 | Happy Valley, Sandakan Pekan, Cathay, Pasar, Sim-Sim, Pulau Berhala, Jalan Dua |
| P.187 Kinabatangan | N.57 Kuamut | 10 | Mananam, Sogo-Sogo, Entilibon, Karamuak, Kuamut, Tongod, Penangah, Masaum, Inarad, Saguan |
| P.187 Kinabatangan | N.58 Lamag | 6 | Buang Sayang, Bukit Garam, Lamag, Balat, Kota Kinabatangan, Usaha Jaya |
| P.187 Kinabatangan | N.59 Sukau | 11 | Tanjung Aru, Mumiang, Lubukan, Suan Lamba, Batu Puteh, Paris, Bilit, Sukau, Abai, Tundun Bohangin, Litang |
| P.188 Lahad Datu | N.60 Tungku | 7 | Segangan, Silabukan, Ulu Tungku, Tungku, FELDA Sahabat, Tambisan, Tanjung Labian |
| P.188 Lahad Datu | N.61 Segama | 9 | Belacon, Dam Road, North Road, Tengah Nipah, Ulu Segama, Segama, Tabanac, Singgahmata, Jalan Segama |
| P.188 Lahad Datu | N.62 Silam | 7 | Sapagaya, Sakar, Bandar Lahad Datu, Lapangan Terbang, Panji Baru, Taman Fajar, Silam |
| P.188 Lahad Datu | N.63 Kunak | 8 | Mostyn, Madai, Kampung Kunak, Giram, Pengkalan Kunak, Kunak Jaya, Pangi, Pekan Kunak |
| P.189 Semporna | N.64 Sulabayan | 12 | Pulau, Bum-Bum Utara, Sisipan, Bum-Bum Selatan, Sulabayan, Denawan, Larapan, Selakan, Terusan, Hampalan, Tongkalloh, Pulau Omadal |
| P.189 Semporna | N.65 Senallang | 11 | Pekan Semporna, Tampi-Tampi, Kabogan, Pakalangan, Tagasan, Mantaritip, Musallah, Inabah Kamal, Pulau Mabul, Bukit Lalang, Kubang Baru |
| P.189 Semporna | N.66 Bugaya | 9 | Semporna Darat, Sungai Tohok, Bugaya, Tanjung Kapor, Bubul, Kampong Ayer, Lihak-Lihak, Simunul, Bangau-Bangau |
| P.190 Tawau | N.67 Balung | 6 | Kinabutan, Andrassy, Balung, Kinabutan Besar, Bukit Quoin, Ranggu |
| P.190 Tawau | N.68 Apas | 7 | Tawau Lama, Tinagat, Apas, Wakuba, Titingan, Inderasabah, Batu 4 |
| P.190 Tawau | N.69 Sri Tanjong | 10 | Kuhara, Sin On, Fajar, Sabindo, Kabota, Batu 3, Da Hua, Kapital, Jalan Chester, Takada |
| P.191 Kalabakan | N.70 Kukusan | 5 | Muhibbah Raya, Sentosa, Kukusan, Padang Terbang, Banyan |
| P.191 Kalabakan | N.71 Tanjong Batu | 3 | Pasir Putih, Tanjung Batu, Keramat |
| P.191 Kalabakan | N.72 Merotai | 6 | Brumas, Kijang, Bombalai, Air Panas, Semarak, Merotai |
| P.191 Kalabakan | N.73 Sebatik | 7 | Luasong, Kalabakan, Umas-Umas, Sarudung Laut, Sebatik, Tamang, Bergosong |

== Sarawak ==
=== 2026 September first reclination version ===
| Federal constituency | State constituency | Polling districts | |
|---|---|---|---|
| P.192 Mas Gading | N.01 Serayan (Opar) | 20 | Temaga, Sebako, Serayan, Sebiris, Jangkar, Biawak, Sedaing, Rukam, Sembawang, Kandaie, Pasir Tengah, Sebandi, Senibong, Selampit, Bokah, Raso, Raso II, Stungkor, Stom Muda, Stenggang |
| P.192 Mas Gading | N.02 Jagoi (New) | 14 | Jugan, Opar, Skibang, Stass, Sibobog, Serikin, Jagoi, Bogag, Serasot, Tai Ton, Suba Buan, Suba Bau, Bau, Jambusan |
| P.192 Mas Gading | N.03 Singai (Tasik Biru) | 17 | Skiat, Sebuku, Grogo, Buso, Musi, Sungai Pinang, Tanjong Poting, Atas, Sudoh, Tondong, Sibuloh, Apar, Barieng, Segong, Daun, Sajong, Bobak |
| P.192 Mas Gading | N.04 Serembu (Original from Puncak Borneo) | 21 | Kandis, Tanjung Durian, Siniawan, Peninjau Baru, Podam, Paku, Merembeh, Kranji, Kopit, Sogo, Segubang, Seromah, Krokong, Puak Krokong,Blimbin, Seropak, Monggak, Padang Pan, Gumbang, Pangkalan Tebang, Rabak Rotan |
| P.193 Santubong | N.05 Tanjong Datu | 15 | Telok Melano, Pueh, Sebat, Sematan, Perigi, Bajo, Sekambal, Kampung Sebemban, Seling, Lundu, Stunggang, Temelan, Sampadi, Stoh, Rambungan |
| P.193 Santubong | N.06 Pasir Pandak (New) | 7 | Telaga Air, Jaya Bakti, Temenggong, Salak, Bandar Baru Samariang, Rampangi, Sejinjang |
| P.193 Santubong | N.07 Pantai Damai | 6 | Santubong, Buntal, Demak Baru, Astana, Semarang, Bintawa |
| P.193 Santubong | N.08 Samariang (Original from Petra Jaya) | 3 | Samariang, Semerah Padi, Sukma |
| P.194 Petra Jaya | N.09 Matang (New) | 10 | Kolong 1, Malihah, Kolong 2, Sungai Tengah, Kampung Matang, Palma Indah, Batu Tujuh Matang, Taman Heng Guan, Paroh, Matang |
| P.194 Petra Jaya | N.10 Semarak (New) | 7 | Gita, Sejoli, Taman Yen Yen, Matang Jaya, Taman Won, Sri Wangi, Rahmat |
| P.194 Petra Jaya | N.11 Tupong | 7 | Tupong, Kampong Tunku, Lintang, Sinjan, Bedil, Astana Lot, Kandis |
| P.194 Petra Jaya | N.12 Satok | 8 | Segedup, Nanas, Satok, Patingan, Patinggi Ali, Masjid, Maderasah, Reservior |
| P.195 Bandar Kuching | N.13 Padungan | 16 | Market, Bazaar, Padungan, Ban Hock, Abell, Petanak, Central, Sekama, Lumba Kuda, Deshon, Ellis, Simpang Tiga, Bukit Tuan, Kinyang, Pisang, Nanas - Pisang |
| P.195 Bandar Kuching | N.14 Pending | 8 | Binta Fishing Village, Sungai Apong, Pending, Peace Road, Foochow, Pecky Park, Chawan, Chong Kiun Kong |
| P.195 Bandar Kuching | N.15 Batu Lintang | 9 | Maong, Star Garden, Poh Kwong Park, Sky Garden, RPR Batu Kawah, Batu Lintang, Bukit Kenny, Tabuan Dayak, Seledah |
| P.195 Bandar Kuching | N.16 Tabuan Jaya (New) | 6 | Kenyalang, Supreme, Tabuan Jaya, Tabuan Laru, Tabuan Height, Stutong |
| P.196 Stampin | N.17 Batu Kitang | 15 | Jalan Stakan, Batu Kitang, Haji Baki, Sudat, Semeba, tematu, Pangkalan Baru, Kitang, Rantau Panjang Batu Kawa, Lidah Tanah, Bumbok, Kota Padawan, Rcbm, Paya Mebi, Landeh |
| P.196 Stampin | N.18 Batu Kawah | 8 | Sin San Tu, Kim Chu Sin, Kawah, Stephen Yong, Kampung Stapok, Field Force, Stapok, Batu Kawah Low-Cost |
| P.196 Stampin | N.19 Maong (New) | 7 | Desa Wira, Skim Penempatan Batu Kawa, Sindar Budi, Arang, Pasar Maong, Batu Empat, Hui Sing |
| P.196 Stampin | N.20 Kota Sentosa | 9 | Sungai Lubak, Batu Tujoh, Kem Tentera Batu Tujuh, Sungai Tapang, Kampung Sungai Tapang, Airport Kuching, Satria Jaya, Stampin, Stutong Baru |
| P.197 Kota Samarahan | N.21 Demak Laut (Original from Santubong) | 11 | Bako, Muara Tebas, Geobilt, Senari, Tanjong Embang, Sejingkat, Tanjong Bako, Pinggan Jaya, Muara Tabuan, Tabuan Melayu, Tabuan Hulu |
| P.197 Kota Samarahan | N.22 Muara Tuang | 7 | Endap, Meranek, Unimas, Tuang, Empila, Ladang Samarahan, Semaran |
| P.197 Kota Samarahan | N.23 Samarindah (New) | 11 | Tanju, Batu Blat, Rembus, Tanjung Bundong, Pinang, Melaban, Binyu, Merdang, Samar Indah, Merdang Gayam, Merdang Lumut |
| P.197 Kota Samarahan | N.24 Stakan | 6 | Sungai Empit, Stakan, Jalan Muara Tuang, Pengkalan Kuap, Quop, Sidanu |
| P.198 Puncak Borneo | N.25 Mambong | 25 | Sepit, Maras, Pengkalan Ampat, Kiding, Semban, Tebia, Temurang, Jambu, Bengoh, Danu, Semadang, Gerung, Bayor, Karu, Staang, Bunuk, Giam, Nyiru, Punau, Pulasar, Petag, Sikong, Mambong, Seratau, Siburan |
| P.198 Puncak Borneo | N.26 Sungai Serin (New) | 21 | Siburan Village, Duras, Masaan, Tijirak, Petung, Tabuan Rabak, Mundai, Sarig, Simpuk, Braang, Gayu, Pesang, Subang, Teng Bukap, Peraya, Stabut, Sekuduk, Maang, Tapah, Beratok, Batu Gong |
| P.198 Puncak Borneo | N.27 Bung Sadung (Tarat) | 17 | Retoh, Sungai Barie, Panchor, Taee, Plaman Nyabet, Sira, Lanchang, Bentang, Munggu Lalang, Pekan Tarat, Tarat Baru, Kakai, Pasar Serian, Rayang, Baki, Sebemban, Tanah Puteh |
| P.199 Serian | N.28 Tebedu | 31 | Belimbing, Semaru, Annah Rais, Sadir, Simuti, Bisira, Dunuk, Merakep, Tubih, Sejijak, Tepoi, Temong, Sungan, Tema, Tebedu, Entubuh, Tesu, Kujang Mawang, Kuhang Sain, Daha Kisau, Daha Seroban, Amo, Gahat Mawang, Lobang Batu, Sebintin, Payau, Bidak, Mawang Taup, Reteh, Pichin, Krusen |
| P.199 Serian | N.29 Kedup | 28 | Sangai Meringu, Prangkan, Engkeroh, Bugu, Pridan, Sumpas Tampek, Semukoi, Pangkalan Bedup, Triboh, Antayan, Junggu Mawang, Sungai Engkabang, Krabit, Mubok Berawan, Mayang Mawang, Mayang Kawan, Mentong Merau, Sungai Rimu, Kerangan, Tong Nibong, Paon Gahat, Mentu Tapu, Mentu Pundok, Mongkos, Mjuat, Bunan Gega, Tebat, Mapu |
| P.199 Serian | N.30 Bukit Semuja | 21 | Tangga, Riih Mawang, Riih Daso, Tebakang, Sedihan, Koran, Sorak Dayak, Sorak Melayu, Selabi, Merian, Kampung Rasau, Seroban, Ranchan, Munggu Limo, Serian Hulu, Government Residential Area Serian, Serian Hilir, Ampungan, Lebor Remun, Kuala, Merakai |
| P.200 Batang Sadong | N.31 Gedong | 7 | Sateman, Ensengai, Pangkor, Tegelam, Gedong, Keniong, Kepayang |
| P.200 Batang Sadong | N.32 Simunjan | 14 | Rangkang, Putin, Rangawan, Terasi, Senangeh, Sungai Buloh, Ensengei, Tanjong Harapan, Slangking, Sungai Apin, Simunjan, Sageng, Sekendu, Temiang |
| P.200 Batang Sadong | N.33 Sadong Jaya | 9 | Sepayor, Semera, Jemukan, Jemukan Ulu, Jaie, Pelandok, Ibok, Sadong Jaya, Sadong Jaya Ulu |
| P.200 Batang Sadong | N.34 Asajaya (Original from Kota Samarahan) | 19 | Beliong, Tanjung Apong, Tambirat, Tambey, Sui, Subi, Sambir, Sebandi Matang, Sebandi Ulu, Moyan Ledang, Moyan, Moyan Ulu, Serpan Ulu, Serpan, Reba, Asajaya Laut, Asajaya, Sampun, Tebun |
| P.201 Batang Lupar | N.35 Sebuyau | 6 | Seruyu, Sebangan ,Sebuyau, Tungkah, Entagor, Senayang |
| P.201 Batang Lupar | N.36 Lingga | 8 | Meludam, Lingga, Seduku, Stumbin, Ladong, Lamanak, Tanjung Bijat, Bakong |
| P.201 Batang Lupar | N.37 Beting Maro | 3 | Beladin, Undai, Pusa |
| P.202 Sri Aman | N.38 Balai Ringin | 7 | Balai Ringin, Ruan, Isu, Ubah, Pantu, Keranggas, Kedumpai |
| P.202 Sri Aman | N.39 Bukit Begunan | 7 | Bukit Balau, Bakong Ai, Empalanjau, Banting, Kara, Melugu, Klauh |
| P.202 Sri Aman | N.40 Simanggang | 7 | Simanggang, Munggu Sabun, Sabu, Lamanak Seberang, Sengat, Banyai, Undup |
| P.203 Lubok Antu | N.41 Engkilili | 21 | Tawai, Kasenduh, Tabut, Basi, Geligau, Sedarat, Engkilili, Marop, Merbong, Merio, Merindun, Semanju, SPLU, Pentik, Mujan, Marutih, Kujoh, Akup, Entalau, Selandong, Jukat |
| P.203 Lubok Antu | N.42 Batang Ai | 24 | Bilararap, Patoh, Sepaya, Delok, Gugu, Engkari, Kachong, Kesit, Nenyang, Ensawang, Lubok Antu, Kutai, Empit, Krangan Mong, Mepi, Sekarok, Bertik, Sempang, Jela, Sebangki, Kaong, Sayat, Klampu, Kumpang |
| P.204 Betong | N.43 Saribas | 20 | Belingan, Sebemban, Tanjong Assam, Bungin, Serembang, Jerai, Debak Laut, Debak, Likis,Sabar, Belasau, Dit, Budak, Tui, Dit Hulu, Serabang, Engkaras, Supa, Manggut, Buda |
| P.204 Betong | N.44 Layar | 31 | Skrang, Aur, Enteban, Penurin, Saka, Jugir, Stambak, Selulap, Kampung Betong, Betong, Entanak, Bebanggai, Tanu, Pasa, Dabok, Padeh, Balingam, Plepok, Kron, Gawis, Jelau, Lubau, Spak, Penyalaneh, Melanjan, Tapeh, Merunjau, Teguyu, Luing, Krapa, Perdu |
| P.204 Betong | N.45 Bukit Saban | 36 | Bair, Jambu, Penebak, Tiput, Pelikoi, Mutok, Meroh, Kubal, Jaloh, Penom, Lingit, Sepuna, Bayor, Rimbas, Tot, Ulu Teru, Babu, Rapong, Delit, Traie, Bungei, Penunus, Metong, Samu, Belabak, Bukit Saban, Suri, Rembai, Matop, Serudit, Teberu, Bangkit, Spaoh Hilir, Spaoh Hulu, Brutan, Spaoh |
| P.205 Saratok | N.46 Krian | 10 | Mudong, Brayang, Batu Anam, Diso, Krangan, NBajau, Melupa, Awik, Kabo, Gerenjang |
| P.205 Saratok | N.47 Kalaka | 6 | Perpat, Pelunga, Kaba, Saratok, Senyawan, Tengalat |
| P.205 Saratok | N.48 Kabong | 3 | Kabong, Nyabor, Roban |
| P.206 Tanjong Manis | N.49 Kuala Rajang | 7 | Belawai, Rajang, Selalang, Sari, Seberang, Masjid Baru, Muara Payang |
| P.206 Tanjong Manis | N.50 Muara Lassa (Semop) | 12 | Paloh, Tekajong, Bruit, Saai, Semop, Nanga Lepa, Mupong, Stubah, Lebaan, Selemas, Bunut, Bintangor |
| P.207 Batang Lassa (Igan) | N.51 Daro | 11 | Daro, Lemang Peh, Tebaang, Semah, Kampung Sebena, Kampung Penasu, Sungai Lengan, Nanga Singat, Lassa, Kampung Sawai, Passin |
| P.207 Batang Lassa (Igan) | N.52 Matu (Jemoreng) | 8 | Kuala Matu, Tian, Sok, Matu, Sekaan Besar, Bawang, Jemoreng, Bekumah |
| P.207 Batang Lassa (Igan) | N.53 Igan (New) | 10 | Igan, Ilas, Senau, Oya, Terus, Teh Oya, Balan, Tanam, Penat |
| P.208 Sarikei | N.54 Repok | 7 | Sarikei, Nyelong Park, Repok, Merudu, Paoh, Peninjau, Pantak |
| P.208 Sarikei | N.55 Meradong | 13 | Bulat, Narasit, Tulai, Kertong, Kelupu, Bandar, Meradong, Kemantan, Mador, Lemayong, Selidap, Nyelong, Sungai Pandan |
| P.209 Julau | N.56 Pakan | 6 | Bayong, Sungai Rusa, Babai, Wuak, Dayu, Lamujan, Balut |
| P.209 Julau | N.57 Meluan | 6 | Julau, Rayah, Meluan, Engkamup, Entabai, Beketan |
| P.210 Kanowit | N.58 Machan | 6 | Lukut, Kanowit, Majau, Poi, Bukong, Latong |
| P.210 Kanowit | N.59 Ngemah | 7 | Peranan, Pidai, Bawan, Mapai, Sengayan, Bat, Kajah |
| P.211 Lanang | N.60 Dudong | 13 | Maludan, Salim, Bukit Penyau, Nanga Salim, Sungai Salim, Dudong, Sungai Nibong, Durin, Bandar Baru Sibu Jaya, Sibu Jaya II, Sibu Jaya, Menyan, Tanggi |
| P.211 Lanang | N.61 Tanah Mas (New) | 16 | Tanah Mas, Lembangan, Pulau Kerto, Lanang, Aik Dee, Bukit Lima Timur, Mantis, Lada, Assan, Keladi, Tanjung Latap, Batu Wong, Naman, Sungai Durin, Sungai Tellian, Pak |
| P.211 Lanang | N.62 Bukit Assek | 12 | Hin Yu, Maling, Layang-Layang, Hua Kiew, Manggis, Lai Chee, Merlin, Tiong Hua, Hardin, Tong Sang, Uk Daik, Kapor Lima |
| P.212 Sibu | N.63 Pelawan | 9 | Dung Sang, Oya Lane, Camar, Cherry, Au Yong, Merdeka, Rajang Park, Pelawan, Nibong |
| P.212 Sibu | N.64 Sungai Merah (New) | 8 | Lotus, Kwong Ann, Gambir, Sungai Antu, Nang Sang, Sungai Merah, Indah, Disa |
| P.212 Sibu | N.65 Nangka | 10 | Rantau Panajng, Penasu, Sungai Teku, Wawasan, Sungai Bidut (North), Bandong, Ilir Nangka, Kampung Hilir, Race Course, Datu Nyabor |
| P.212 Sibu | N.66 Bukit Kemuyang (New) | 7 | Sentosa, Usaha Jaya, Bahagia Jaya, Kemuyang, Permai, Seduan, Rascom |
| P.212 Sibu | N.67 Rassau (Bawang Assan) | 17 | Passai, Bungan, Rassau, Sebedil, Nanga Tutus, Sungai Pangai, Sungai Aup, Bawang Assan, Engkilo, Lower Island, Upper Island, Dassan, Ensurai, Lan, Kunyit, Ma'aw, Selalo |
| P.213 Mukah | N.68 Dalat | 12 | Sungai Dalam, Ud, Dalat, Baru Dalat, Kut, Kut Muara, Kekan, Medong, Klid, Narub, Baoh, Ulu Baoh |
| P.213 Mukah | N.69 Tellian | 12 | Dijih, Engkerbai, Ulu Sikat, Nanga Sikat, Sebakong, Tellian, Tellian Laut, Penakop Permai, Mukah, Kuala Lama, Petanak Mukah, Judan |
| P.213 Mukah | N.70 Balingian | 14 | Tutus, Litong, Jebungan, Penakop, Sesok, Kenyana, Temesu, Penipah, Ulu Bedengan, Bedengan, Balingian, Liok, Suyong, Kuala Balingian |
| P.214 Selangau | N.71 Tamin | 5 | Siong, Tamin, Sekuau, Selangau, Lemai |
| P.214 Selangau | N.72 Kakus | 25 | Bawan, Arip, Annau, Tatau-Buan, Tatau, Bekiran, Tekalit, Lubok Kumpai, Kelebu, Rungan, Nanga Empang, Sangan, Entajum, Ulu Sangan, Muput, Kana, Pasir Nangka, Kakus, Giri, Kulau Belungai, Penyarai, Tau, Setusor, Anap, Takan |
| P.215 Kapit | N.73 Katibas | 7 | Tapang, Bangkit, Tekalit, Katibas, Song, Manap, Temelat |
| P.215 Kapit | N.74 Bukit Goram | 6 | Entangai, Ibau, Menuan, Kapit, Kampung Baru, Sibau |
| P.215 Kapit | N.75 Melekun (New) | 13 | Selirik, Sungai Kapit, Tembawai Sandong, Lun Ili, Entawau Ili, Kebiaw, Nanga Bena, Merating, Entawau Ulu, Sut, Antaroh, Nanga Bawai, Sungai Amang |
| P.215 Kapit | N.76 Pelagus | 11 | Nanga Sut, Nanga Banyau, Teluk Gimang, Pelagus, Nanga Peraran, Lubok Dabai, Nanga Mentah, Nanga Pilla, Nanga Ensawi, Merit, Ulu Metah |
| P.216 Hulu Rajang | N.77 Baleh | 5 | Gaat, Merirai, Baleh, Melinau, Mujong |
| P.216 Hulu Rajang | N.78 Belaga | 10 | Long Busang, Long Lidam, Long Luar, Long Tanyit, Long Wat, Belaga, Ba, Data Kakus, Long Bangan, Long Semutut |
| P.216 Hulu Rajang | N.79 Murum | 7 | Long Peran, Asap, Long Tebila, Long Unan, Jelalong, Sungai Dusan, Sungai Pesu |
| P.217 Bintulu | N.80 Jepak Jaya (Jepak) | 6 | Kuala Tatau, Jepak Jaya, Segan, Sri Dagang, RPR Sebiew, Sungai Nyigu |
| P.217 Bintulu | N.81 Tanjong Batu | 6 | Bintulu Town, Tanjung Batu, Bukit Orang, Assyakirin, Desa Damai, Bandar Jaya |
| P.217 Bintulu | N.82 Samalaju | 8 | Li Hua, Mawar, Melor, RPR Kidurong, Tanjung Kidurong, Taman Permaisuri, Bintulu-Miri Roda, Batu Lima |
| P.217 Bintulu | N.83 Kemena | 9 | Tubau, Pandan, Sungai Sebauh, Sebauh, Sebungan, Labang, Sibiew Simulajau, Sungai Tisang |
| P.217 Bintulu | N.84 Batu Niah (New) | 12 | Hulu Suai, Goyang, Subis Satu, LKTS Suai, Suai, Skrat, Sekaloh, Batu Niah, Kebora, Sungai Tangap, Ladang Dua, Pakut |
| P.218 Sibuti | N.85 Bekenu | 23 | Terahad, Angus, Menjelin, Bungai, Tiris, Kelulit, Tarkan, Niah, Sepupok, Kampung Bukit Bom, Tanjung Belipat, Saeh, Saeh Merah, Ladang Tiga, Essau, Bakas, Hulu Sibuti, Sungai Kelintang, Peninjau, Kabuloh, Keluru, Subak |
| P.218 Sibuti | N.86 Pantai Beraya (Lambir) | 10 | Selanyau, Santap, Beraya, Lambi, Bakam, Sungai Buloh Rait, Sungai Lusut, Tukau, Taman Tunku, Lusut |
| P.219 Miri | N.87 Piasau | 13 | Airport, RAMD, Luak, Tanjong, Kubu, Bazzar, Kampung Lopeng, Canada Hill, Bintang, Merbau, Merpati, Jee Foh Utama, Desa Seri |
| P.219 Miri | N.88 Pujut | 8 | Pujut Tujuh, Pujut Empat, Pujut, Pujut - Lutong, Piasau Jaya, Boulevard, Krokop, Krokop Utama |
| P.219 Miri | N.89 Permaisuri (New) | 12 | Permaisuri, Padang Belon, Lutong, Kampung Senadin, Kauala Baram, Asam Paya, Pangkalan Lutong, Kampung Tudan, Fasa Empat Tudan, Prima Villa, Pujut Adong, Pujut Corner |
| P.219 Miri | N.90 Tudan (New) | 6 | Fasa Dua Tudan, RPR Permyjaya, Fasa Enam Tudan, Promin Jaya, Desa Senadin, Desa Murni |
| P.219 Miri | N.91 Lopeng (Senadin) | 6 | Desa Indah, Desa Pujut, Lopeng, Padang Kerbau, Riam, Sungai Teniku |
| P.220 Baram | N.92 Marudi | 8 | Marudi, Pengalayan, Nabor, Beluru, Sungai Kuap, Sungai Sengkabang, Long Teru, Teruking |
| P.220 Baram | N.93 Usun Apau (New) | 4 | Jegan, Pana, San, Liomatu |
| P.220 Baram | N.94 Telang Usan | 4 | Long Lama, Apoh, Long Miri, Akahpatah |
| P.220 Baram | N.95 Mulu | 9 | Lubok Nibong, Puyut, Tutoh, Lellang, Long Peluan, Remudu, Dano, Bario, Pa'lungan |
| P.221 Limbang | N.96 Bukit Kota | 9 | Ranggau, Sebukang, Tabahan, Poyan, Limbang, Bangkita, Bukit Kota, Pendam, Telahak |
| P.221 Limbang | N.97 Batu Danau | 6 | Berawan, Danau, Lubai, Ukong, Medamit, Medihit |
| P.222 Lawas | N.98 Gunong Murud (Ba'kelalan) | 20 | Ba'kelalan, Semadoh, Lupeng, Tengoa, Sukang, Lapadan, Beriwan, Talis, Suang, Temarop, Ranchangan, Trusan, Siang, Pangi, Batu Tiga, Tuma, Malingan, Pengaleh, Lampaki, Muncu |
| P.222 Lawas | N.99 Bukit Sari | 22 | Sibagol, Merapok, Dato, Pemukat, Bukit Sari, Melusok, Lawas, Mission, Ladang Baru, Temangis, Belipat, Punang, Sualai, Gelapas, Silat, Luagan, Baru, Aru, Katong, Sundar, Pagar, Awat |

=== Original version ===
| Federal constituency | State constituency | Polling districts | |
|---|---|---|---|
| P.192 Mas Gading | N.01 Opar | 22 | Sebiris, Jangkar, Sebandi, Temaga, Stungkor, Opar, Serayan, Rukam, Sembawang, Kandaie, Pasir Tengah, Sedaing, Biawak, Senibong, Sebako, Raso, Raso II, Bokah, Stom Muda, Selampit, Jugan, Stenggang |
| P.192 Mas Gading | N.02 Tasik Biru | 26 | Sajong, Apar, Buso, Tondong, Grogo, Bau, Skiat, Jagoi, Daun, Tanjong Poting, Atas, Barieng, Sudoh, Segong, Musi, Suba Buan, Suba Bau, Sibuloh, Sebuku, Tai Ton, Stass, Skibang, Sibobog, Serasot, Serikin, Bogag |
| P.193 Santubong | N.03 Tanjong Datu | 15 | Telok Melano, Pueh, Sebat, Sematan, Seling, Stunggang, Lundu, Perigi, Sekambal, Bajo, Kampung Sebemban, Temelan, Sampadi, Stoh, Rambungan |
| P.193 Santubong | N.04 Pantai Damai | 12 | Telaga Air, Salak, Temenggong, Jaya Bakti, Santubong, Buntal, Rampangi, Sejinjang, Astana, Demak Baru, Semarang, Bintawa |
| P.193 Santubong | N.05 Demak Laut | 11 | Tanjong Embang, Muara Tebas, Geobilt, Bako, Sejingkat, Senari, Tanjong Bako, Pinggan Jaya, Tabuan Melayu, Muara Tabuan, Tabuan Hulu |
| P.194 Petra Jaya | N.06 Tupong | 9 | Tupong, Gita, Sungai Tengah, Rahmat, Sinjan, Sejoli, Paroh, Matang, Sri Wangi |
| P.194 Petra Jaya | N.07 Samariang | 8 | Samariang, Lintang, Kandis, Semerah Padi, Sukma, Kampong Tunku, Bedil, Astana Lot |
| P.194 Petra Jaya | N.08 Satok | 8 | Segedup, Patingan, Satok, Masjid, Maderasah, Reservoir, Nanas, Patinggi Ali |
| P.195 Bandar Kuching | N.09 Padungan | 13 | Market, Bazaar, Padungan, Abell, Deshon, Sekama, Bukit Tuan, Kinyang, Ellis, Ban Hock, Lumba Kuda, Central, Petanak |
| P.195 Bandar Kuching | N.10 Pending | 7 | Pending, Foochow, Kenyalang, Supreme, Chong Kiun Kong, Chawan, Simpang Tiga |
| P.195 Bandar Kuching | N.11 Batu Lintang | 11 | Pisang, Batu Lintang, Star Garden, Poh Kwong Park, Sky Garden, Bukit Kenny, Tabuan Dayak, Tabuan Jaya, Tabuan Laru, Maong, Nanas-Pisang |
| P.196 Stampin | N.12 Kota Sentosa | 6 | Stampin, Seledah, Satria Jaya, Batu Tujoh, Hui Sing, Batu Empat |
| P.196 Stampin | N.13 Batu Kitang | 6 | Arang, Pasar Maong, Haji Baki, Kitang, Landeh, Lidah Tanah |
| P.196 Stampin | N.14 Batu Kawah | 5 | RPR Batu Kawah, Kawah, Stapok, Sin San Tu, Kim Chu Shin |
| P.197 Kota Samarahan | N.15 Asajaya | 19 | Beliong, Tanjung Apong, Tambirat, Tambey, Sui, Sambir, Sebandi Matang, Sebandi Ulu, Subi, Moyan, Reba, Moyan Ulu, Moyan Ledang, Serpan, Serpan Ulu, Asajaya, Asajaya Laut, Tebun, Sampun |
| P.197 Kota Samarahan | N.16 Muara Tuang | 7 | Empila, Tanju, Batu Blat, Tuang, Semaran, Ladang Samarahan, Melaban |
| P.197 Kota Samarahan | N.17 Stakan | 5 | Merdang, Quop, Sidanu, Pengkalan Kuap, Stakan |
| P.198 Puncak Borneo | N.18 Serembu | 22 | Siniawan, Kranji, Kopit, Krokong, Podam, Peninjau Baru, Merembeh, Kandis, Sungai Pinang, Paku, Tanjung Durian, Seropak, Seromah, Segubang, Sogo, Rabak Rotan, Pengkalan Tebang, Monggak, Blimbin, Gumbang, Padang Pan, Puak Krokong |
| P.198 Puncak Borneo | N.19 Mambong | 32 | Mambong, Siburan, Braang, Duras, Pulasar, Nyiru, Giam, Sikog, Staang, Petag, Bayor, Jambu, Semban, Tebia, Danu, Temurang, Bengoh, Gerung, Semadang, Karu, Seratau, Punau, Bunuk, Batu Gong, Anah Rais, Sepit, Kiding, Simuti, Maras, Sadir, Pengkalan Ampat, Masaan |
| P.198 Puncak Borneo | N.20 Tarat | 33 | Tijirak, Petung, Tabuan Rabak, Simpuk, Sekuduk, Panchor, Pekan Tarat, Baki, Ampungan, Tapah, Mundai, Beratok, Pesang, Gayu, Sarig, Sira, Teng Bukap, Subang, Stabut, Peraya, Maang, Merakep, Bisira, Dunuk, Semaru, Belimbing, Retoh, Sungai Barie, Tarat Baru, Munggu Lalang, Rayang, Sebemban, Tanah Puteh |
| P.199 Serian | N.21 Tebedu | 5 | Bentang, Lanchang, Tebedu, Amo, Mengarat |
| P.199 Serian | N.22 Kedup | 4 | Sibauh, Mongkos, Kedup, Antayan |
| P.199 Serian | N.23 Bukit Semuja | 6 | Sedihan, Triboh, Selabi, Pasar Serian, Kakai, Serian Hulu |
| P.200 Batang Sadong | N.24 Sadong Jaya | 9 | Sepayor, Semera, Jemukan, Jemukan Ulu, Sadong Jaya, Sadong Jaya Ulu, Jaie, Iboi, Pelandok |
| P.200 Batang Sadong | N.25 Simunjan | 14 | Rangkang, Putin, Rangawan, Terasi, Senangeh, Sungai Buloh, Ensengei, Simunjan, Temiang, Sageng, Sekendu, Sungai Apin, Tanjong Beluku, Slangking |
| P.200 Batang Sadong | N.26 Gedong | 7 | Kepayang, Ensengai, Sateman, Pangkor, Gedong, Tegelam, Keniong |
| P.201 Batang Lupar | N.27 Sebuyau | 6 | Seruyu, Sebangan, Sebuyau, Entangor, Senayang, Tungkah |
| P.201 Batang Lupar | N.28 Lingga | 6 | Lingga, Meludam, Seduku, Stumbin, Ladong, Lamanak |
| P.201 Batang Lupar | N.29 Beting Maro | 3 | Beladin, Undai, Pusa |
| P.202 Sri Aman | N.30 Balai Ringin | 7 | Isu, Balai Ringin, Ruan, Kedumpai, Ubah, Pantu, Keranggas |
| P.202 Sri Aman | N.31 Bukit Begunan | 5 | Banting, Kara, Melugu, Klauh, Bukit Balau |
| P.202 Sri Aman | N.32 Simanggang | 7 | Sabu, Simanggang, Lamanak Seberang, Munggu Sabun, Sengat, Undup, Bayai |
| P.203 Lubok Antu | N.33 Engkilili | 24 | Skrang, Enteban, Entalau, Semanju, Kasenduh, Engkilili, Tabut, Aur, Pentik, Jukat, Seladong, Akup, Marutih, Mujan, Kujoh, SPLU, Merindun, Tawai, Basi, Geligau, Sedarat, Marop, Merio, Merbong |
| P.203 Lubok Antu | N.34 Batang Ai | 24 | Sebangki, Lubok Antu, Sekarok, Kesit, Engkari, Delok, Kaong, Empit, Kumpang, Klampu, Sayat, Kutai, Mepi, Jela, Sempang, Bertik, Krangan Mong, Ensawang, Kachong, Patoh, Bilararap, Sepaya, Gugu, Nenyang |
| P.204 Betong | N.35 Saribas | 21 | Manggut, Tui, Debak, Bungin, Likis, Supa, Engkaras, Buda, Serabang, Belasau, Sabar, Dit, Dit Hulu, Bungei, Jerai, Debak Laut, Serembang, Tanjong Assam, Sebemban, Belingan, Budak |
| P.204 Betong | N.36 Layar | 28 | Spak, Padeh, Bebanggai, Betong, Kampung Betong, Lubau, Penyalaneh, Jelau, Melanjan, Tapeh, Luing, Krapa, Teguyu, Perdu, Dabok, Gawis, Balingam, Kron, Plepok, Merunjau, Entanak, Saka, Penurin, Tanu, Jugir, Pasa, Selulap, Stambak |
| P.204 Betong | N.37 Bukit Saban | 35 | Penunus, Rimbas, Spaoh, Suri, Bukit Saban, Kubal, Brutan, Bayor, Ulu Teru, Metong, Delit, Babu, Traie, Rapong, Tot, Spaoh Hulu, Spaoh Hilir, Belabak, Lingit, Penom, Meroh, Sepuna, Samu, Mutok, Penebak, Bair, Jambu, Tiput, Pelikoi, Jaloh, Serudit, Matop, Teberu, Rembai, Bangkit |
| P.205 Saratok | N.38 Kalaka | 6 | Pelunga, Perpat, Kaba, Saratok, Tengalat, Senyawan |
| P.205 Saratok | N.39 Krian | 10 | Mudong, Brayang, Batu Anam, Diso, Awik, Melupa, Kabo, Gerenjang, Bajau, Krangan |
| P.205 Saratok | N.40 Kabong | 3 | Nyabor, Roban, Kabong |
| P.206 Tanjong Manis | N.41 Kuala Rajang | 6 | Selalang, Belawai, Rajang, Sari, Seberang, Nanga Lepa |
| P.206 Tanjong Manis | N.42 Semop | 8 | Paloh, Mupong, Semop, Saai, Tekajong, Bruit, Bunut, Bintangor |
| P.207 Igan | N.43 Daro | 6 | Semah, Tebaang, Daro, Lemang Peh, Lassa, Lebaan |
| P.207 Igan | N.44 Jemoreng | 10 | Kuala Matu, Sok, Matu, Sekaan Besar, Jemoreng, Bawang, Tian, Bekumah, Ilas, Igan |
| P.208 Sarikei | N.45 Repok | 8 | Bulat, Pantak, Repok, Sarikei, Merudu, Peninjau, Paoh, Nyelong Park |
| P.208 Sarikei | N.46 Meradong | 12 | Narasit, Tulai, Kertong, Kelupu, Bandar, Meradong, Kemantan, Mador, Lemayong, Selemas, Selidap, Nyelong |
| P.209 Julau | N.47 Pakan | 6 | Bayong, Sungai Rusa, Babai, Lamujan, Wuak, Dayu |
| P.209 Julau | N.48 Meluan | 7 | Balut, Julau, Rayah, Meluan, Engkamup, Entabai, Beketan |
| P.210 Kanowit | N.49 Ngemah | 6 | Kajah, Bat, Sengayan, Mapai, Bawan, Pidai |
| P.210 Kanowit | N.50 Machan | 7 | Lukut, Kanowit, Majau, Peranan, Poi, Bukong, Latong |
| P.211 Lanang | N.51 Bukit Assek | 14 | Tiong Hua, Tong Sang, Keladi, Kapor Lima, Lembangan, Uk Daik, Hardin, Lai Chee, Merlin, Hua Kiew, Hin Yu, Layang-Layang, Manggis, Maling |
| P.211 Lanang | N.52 Dudong | 12 | Assan, Naman, Pak, Dudong, Salim, Lanang, Aik Dee, Menyan, Sibu Jaya, Lada, Usaha Jaya, Mantis |
| P.212 Sibu | N.53 Bawang Assan | 13 | Rassau, Penasu, Bawang Assan, Kunyit, Ma'aw, Selalo, Dassan, Ensurai, Lan, Engkilo, Lower Island, Upper Island, Tanah Mas |
| P.212 Sibu | N.54 Pelawan | 11 | Rajang Park, Pelawan, Sungai Merah, Disa, Sungai Antu, Gambir, Camar, Merdeka, Oya Lane, Indah, Nibong |
| P.212 Sibu | N.55 Nangka | 8 | Bandong, Bahagia Jaya, Datu Nyabor, Ilir Nangka, Teku, Seduan, Tanggi, Race Course |
| P.213 Mukah | N.56 Dalat | 16 | Tanam, Dalat, Kut, Balan, Ud, Baru Dalat, Sungai Dalam, Klid, Kekan, Medong, Kut Muara, Narub, Oya, Terus, Teh Oya, Senau |
| P.213 Mukah | N.57 Tellian | 15 | Baoh, Penat, Sebakong, Ulu Baoh, Dijih, Ulu Sikat, Nanga Sikat, Engkerbai, Petanak Mukah, Tellian, Judan, Kuala Lama, Tellian Laut, Mukah, Penakop Permai |
| P.213 Mukah | N.58 Balingian | 14 | Litong, Penakop, Temesu, Balingian, Tutus, Jebungan, Kenyana, Sesok, Ulu Bedengan, Bedengan, Penipah, Kuala Balingian, Suyong, Liok |
| P.214 Selangau | N.59 Tamin | 5 | Siong, Tamin, Sekuau, Selangau, Lemai |
| P.214 Selangau | N.60 Kakus | 25 | Bawan, Arip, Tatau-Buan, Kakus, Anap, Tatau, Lubok Kumpai, Bekiran, Tekalit, Rungan, Giri, Kelebu, Entajum, Ulu Sangan, Sangan, Penyarai, Kulau Belungai, Muput, Pasir Nangka, Nanga Empang, Kana, Setusor, Tau, Takan, Annau |
| P.215 Kapit | N.61 Pelagus | 4 | Pelagus, Sungai Amang, Nanga Peraran, Sut |
| P.215 Kapit | N.62 Katibas | 7 | Manap, Temelat, Song, Katibas, Tapang, Bangkit, Tekalit |
| P.215 Kapit | N.63 Bukit Goram | 8 | Sungai Kapit, Kapit, Menuan, Ibau, Kampung Baru, Selirik, Sibau, Entangai |
| P.216 Hulu Rajang | N.64 Baleh | 5 | Gaat, Mujong, Melinau, Baleh, Merirai |
| P.216 Hulu Rajang | N.65 Belaga | 7 | Data Kakus, Merit, Ba, Belaga, Long Busang, Long Bangan, Long Semutut |
| P.216 Hulu Rajang | N.66 Murum | 3 | Long Murum, Asap, Tubau |
| P.217 Bintulu | N.67 Jepak | 6 | Kuala Tatau, Sri Dagang, Jepak, Segan, Sungai Nyigu, RPR Sibiew |
| P.217 Bintulu | N.68 Tanjong Batu | 6 | Bintulu Town, Bukit Orang, Tanjung Batu, Li Hua, Desa Damai, Batu Lima |
| P.217 Bintulu | N.69 Kemena | 9 | Sebauh, Labang, Hulu Suai, Sekaloh, Sungai Sebauh, Sebungan, Pandan, Goyang, Subis Satu |
| P.217 Bintulu | N.70 Samalaju | 7 | Sibiew Similajau, Tanjung Kidurong, Suai, Melor, Mawar, RPR Kidurong, LKTS Suai |
| P.218 Sibuti | N.71 Bekenu | 9 | Batu Niah, Niah, Saeh, Kelulit, Tiris, Bungai, Bekanu, Bakas, Hulu Sibuti |
| P.218 Sibuti | N.72 Lambir | 6 | Peninjau, Satap, Bakam, Lambir, Airport, Tukau |
| P.219 Miri | N.73 Piasau | 9 | Kubu, Bazaar, Merbau, Merpati, Permaisuri, Bintang, Lutong, Tanjong, Luak |
| P.219 Miri | N.74 Pujut | 2 | Pujut, Krokop |
| P.219 Miri | N.75 Senadin | 3 | Kuala Baram, Lopeng, Riam |
| P.220 Baram | N.76 Marudi | 7 | Nabor, Pengalayan, Marudi, Beluru, Teruking, Long Teru, Jegan |
| P.220 Baram | N.77 Telang Usan | 6 | Long Miri, Pana, Akapatah, San, Long Lama, Apoh |
| P.220 Baram | N.78 Mulu | 10 | Lubok Nibong, Puyut, Liomatu, Tutoh, Long Peluan, Bario, Pa'lungan, Dano, Remudu/Ramudu, Lellang |
| P.221 Limbang | N.79 Bukit Kota | 10 | Ranggau, Sebukang, Tabahan, Bangkita, Limbang, Poyan, Bukit Kota, Pendam, Telahak, Berawan |
| P.221 Limbang | N.80 Batu Danau | 5 | Danau, Lubai, Ukong, Medihit, Medamit |
| P.222 Lawas | N.81 Ba'kelalan | 20 | Semadoh, Beriwan, Maligan, Trusan, Sukang, Lupeng, Ba'kelalan, Temarop, Suang, Talis, Lapadan, Tengoa, Tuma, Pengaleh, Siang, Pangi, Batu Tiga, Lampaki, Muncu, Ranchangan |
| P.222 Lawas | N.82 Bukit Sari | 22 | Sundar, Bukit Sari, Merapok, Lawas, Gelapas, Awat, Baru, Luagan, Aru, Pagar, Katong, Pemukat, Dato, Belipat, Sualai, Punang, Sibagol, Melusok, Temangis, Mission, Ladang Baru, Silat |
