= Tawau Division =

Administrative sub-divisions of Malaysia

Coordinates: 4.5000°N 118.0000°E

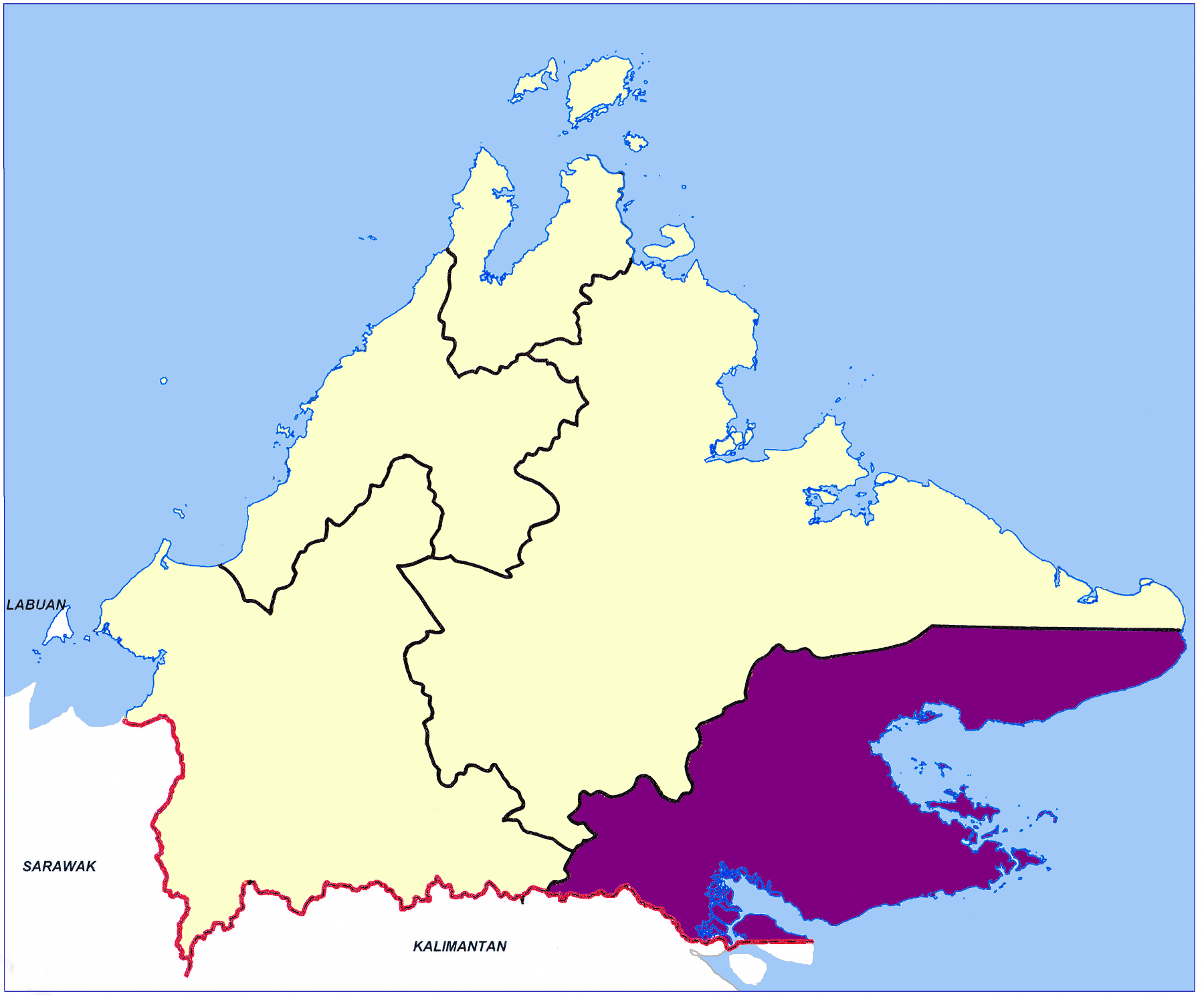
Location map of the Tawau Division.

Tawau Division (Malay: Bahagian Tawau) is one of the five administrative sub-divisions of Sabah, Malaysia. It occupies a total of 14,905 square kilometres or 20% of Sabah's territory. The main towns include the capital of Tawau, Lahad Datu, Kunak and Semporna. Tawau division has 26% of Sabah's total population, with the main indigenous groups consisting of the Bajau, Suluk, Ida'an, Tidong, Cocos, Murut, Lun Bawang/Lun Dayeh as well as a minority of mixed ethnic groups. Large numbers of both legal and illegal immigrants from Indonesia such as the Buginese and Torajans, from East Timor the Timorese, from the Philippines the Tausūg and Visayans as well South and West Asian immigrants such as Pakistanis, Indians and Arabs can be found in this area. As with the rest of Sabah, the division also has large numbers of ethnic Chinese (whom are mostly Hakkas including of mixed-race or Sino-Native descent).

Tawau port is the third largest port after Kota Kinabalu and Sandakan. The port serves as a major timber and agricultural products export centre. There are two domestic airports serving the Tawau division: one in Tawau and one in Lahad Datu. The division includes the islands of Sipadan and Ligitan, as well as the northern half of Sebatik Island (the southern half lies within Indonesia). It also includes Tawau Hills Park.

== Districts ==
Tawau Division is subdivided into the following administrative districts:

- Kalabakan District (3,885 km^{2}) (Kalabakan Town)
- Kunak District (1,134 km^{2}) (Kunak Town)
- Lahad Datu District (6,501 km^{2}) (Lahad Datu Town)
- Semporna District (1,145 km^{2}) (Semporna Town)
- Tawau District (2,240 km^{2}) (Tawau City)

Kalabakan District was split from Tawau District on 1 January 2019.

== Constituencies ==
Tawau division is divided into four federal constituencies and 14 state constituencies:

Parliament			Legislative Assembly		
Constituency	MPs (2022)	Party	Constituency	MLAs (2020)	Party
P188 Lahad Datu	Mohammad Yusof Apdal	WARISAN	N60 Tungku	Assaffal P. Alian	WARISAN
P188 Lahad Datu	Mohammad Yusof Apdal	WARISAN	N61 Segama	Mohamaddin Ketapi	BN (UMNO)
P188 Lahad Datu	Mohammad Yusof Apdal	WARISAN	N62 Silam	Dumi Pg. Masdal	WARISAN
P188 Lahad Datu	Mohammad Yusof Apdal	WARISAN	N63 Kunak	Norazlinah Arif	GRS (GAGASAN)
P189 Semporna	Mohd Shafie Apdal	WARISAN	N64 Sulabayan	Jaujan Sambakong	WARISAN
P189 Semporna	Mohd Shafie Apdal	WARISAN	N65 Senallang	Shafie Apdal	WARISAN
P189 Semporna	Mohd Shafie Apdal	WARISAN	N66 Bugaya	Jamil Hamzah	WARISAN
P190 Tawau	Lo Su Fui	GRS (PBS)	N67 Balung	Hamid Awang	GRS (GAGASAN)
P190 Tawau	Lo Su Fui	GRS (PBS)	N68 Apas	Nizam Abu Bakar Titingan	GRS (GAGASAN)
P190 Tawau	Lo Su Fui	GRS (PBS)	N69 Sri Tanjong	Justin Wong Yung Bin	WARISAN
P191 Kalabakan	Andi Muhammad Suryady Bandy	BN (UMNO)	N70 Kukusan	Rina Jainal	GRS (PHRS)
P191 Kalabakan	Andi Muhammad Suryady Bandy	BN (UMNO)	N71 Tanjong Batu	Andi Muhammad Suryandy Bandy	BN (UMNO)
P191 Kalabakan	Andi Muhammad Suryady Bandy	BN (UMNO)	N72 Merotai	Sarifuddin Hata	WARISAN
P191 Kalabakan	Andi Muhammad Suryady Bandy	BN (UMNO)	N73 Sebatik	Hassan A. Gani Pg. Amir	GRS (GAGASAN)

== History ==
The present divisions of Sabah is largely inherited from the division of the North Borneo Chartered Company. Following the acquisition of North Borneo under the royal charter issued in 1881, the administrative division introduced by Baron von Overbeck was continued by the establishment of two residences comprising West Coast Residency and East Coast Residency. Seat of the two residents was in Sandakan, where the governor was based. Each resident, in turn, was divided into several provinces managed by a district officer. (Note: The original position was initially Magistrates-in-charge.)

As North Borneo progresses, the number of residencies has increased to five including: Tawau Residency (also known as East Coast Residency), Sandakan Residency, West Coast Residency, Kudat Residency, and Interior Residency; the provinces were initially named after the members of the board: Alcock, Cunlife, Dewhurst, Keppel, Dent, Martin, Elphinstone, Myburgh and Mayne. The senior residents occupied Sandakan and the West Coast, while the other three resident with the second class residencies occupied Interior, East Coast and Kudat. The residents of Sandakan and West Coast were members of the Legislative Council, the Legislative Assembly of the company.

The division into residencies was maintained when North Borneo became a Crown Colony after World War II. On 16 September 1963, with the formation of Malaysia, North Borneo which subsequently became the state of Sabah took over the administrative structure through the Ordinance on Administrative Units. At the same time, the Yang di-Pertua Negeri, the head of state of Sabah, was authorised by proclamation to divide the state into divisions and districts. (Note: The most recent such proclamation dates from 2009: Administrative Divisions Proclamation 2009.) The abolition of the residency term was in favour of the division term that took place in 1976.

Today, the division has only formal significance and no longer constitutes its own administrative level. The resident's post was also abolished, as Sabah's municipal administration is in the hands of the district officers.

== See also ==
- Divisions of Malaysia

== Literature ==
- Tregonning, K. G. (1965). A History Of Modern Sabah (North Borneo 1881–1963). University of Malaya Press.
