= Lahad Datu (federal constituency) =

Federal constituency in Sabah, Malaysia

Lahad Datu (P188)
Sabah constituency

Federal constituency
- Legislature: Dewan Rakyat
- MP: Yusof Apdal; Heritage
- Constituency created: 2019
- First contested: 2022
- Last contested: 2022

Demographics
- Population (2020): 299,550
- Electors (2022): 107,696
- Area (km²): 8,594
- Pop. density (per km²): 34.9

Lahad Datu is a federal constituency in Tawau Division (Kunak District and Lahad Datu District) and Sandakan Division (Kinabatangan District), Sabah, Malaysia, that has been represented in the Dewan Rakyat since 2019, when it was renamed from Silam in honour of those who fought in the 2013 Lahad Datu standoff.

The federal constituency was created in the 2019 redistribution and is mandated to return a single member to the Dewan Rakyat under the first past the post voting system.

== Demographics ==
https://ge15.orientaldaily.com.my/seats/sabah/p

Ethnic breakdown of Lahad Datu's electorate as of 2022
1. Malay-Muslim Bumiputera (43.5%)
2. Sabah Bumiputera (38.5%)
3. Chinese (10.0%)
4. Other ethnicities (7.80%)

As of 2020, Lahad Datu has a population of 299,550 people.

Age breakdown of Lahad Datu's electorate as of 2022
1. 18-20 (8.81%)
2. 21-29 (27.7%)
3. 30-39 (24.8%)
4. 40-49 (14.8%)
5. 50-59 (11.3%)
6. 60-69 (8.08%)
7. 70-79 (2.77%)
8. 80-89 (1.00%)
9. above 90 (0.74%)
Gender breakdown of Lahad Datu's electorate as of 2022
1. Male (51.9%)
2. Female (48.1%)

== History ==
=== Polling districts ===
According to the gazette issued on 21 November 2025, the Lahad Datu constituency has a total of 31 polling districts.

State constituency	Polling District	Code	Location
Tungku (N60)	Segangan	188/60/01	SK Bikang
Tungku (N60)	Silabukan	188/60/02	SMK Silabukan
Tungku (N60)	Ulu Tungku	188/60/03	SK Sri Darun
Tungku (N60)	Tungku	188/60/04	SMK Tungku; SK Bangingod; SK Sri Pantai
Tungku (N60)	FELDA Sahabat	188/60/05	SK Sahabat 16; SK Cenderawasih; SK Sahabat II
Tungku (N60)	Tambisan	188/60/06	Mini Dewan Tambisan Darat
Tungku (N60)	Tanjung Labian	188/60/07	SK Tanjung Labian
Segama (N61)	Belacon	188/61/01	SMK Segama
Segama (N61)	Dam Road	188/61/02	SMK Agasah
Segama (N61)	North Road	188/61/03	SK Lahad Datu II
Segama (N61)	Tengah Nipah	188/61/04	SK Binuang
Segama (N61)	Ulu Segama	188/61/05	SK Sandau
Segama (N61)	Segama	188/61/06	SJK (C) Kiau Shing
Segama (N61)	Tabanac	188/61/07	SK Lahad Datu IV
Segama (N61)	Singgahmata	188/61/08	SJK (C) Chee Vun
Segama (N61)	Jalan Segama	188/61/09	SJK (C) Yuk Choi
Silam (N62)	Sepagaya	188/62/01	SK Teruasan
Silam (N62)	Sakar	188/62/02	SK Tanjong Paras
Silam (N62)	Bandar Lahad Datu	188/62/03	SK Lahad Datu III
Silam (N62)	Lapangan Terbang	188/62/04	SMK St. Dominic
Silam (N62)	Panji Baru	188/62/05	SK St. Dominic
Silam (N62)	Taman Fajar	188/62/06	SJK (C) Siew Ching
Silam (N62)	Silam	188/62/07	SK Silam; SK Kennedy Bay
Kunak (N63)	Mostyn	188/63/08	SK Mostyn
Kunak (N63)	Madai	188/63/02	SMK Madai
Kunak (N63)	Kampung Kunak	188/63/03	SK Kunak I
Kunak (N63)	Gidam	188/63/04	SK Skim Kokos; SK Ladang Giram
Kunak (N63)	Pengkalan Kunak	188/63/05	SMK Kunak
Kunak (N63)	Kunak Jaya	183/63/06	SK Kunak Jaya; SK Kunak 2
Kunak (N63)	Pangi	183/63/07	SK Pangi
Kunak (N63)	Pekan Kunak	183/63/08	SMK Kunak Jaya; SK Kampung Selamat

=== Representation history ===
Members of Parliament for Lahad Datu
Parliament	No	Years	Member	Party	Vote Share
Constituency created from Kinabatangan and Silam
15th	P188	2022–present	Mohammad Yusof Apdal (محمّد يوسف أڤضل)	WARISAN	27,116; 46.64%

=== State constituency ===
Parliamentary constituency	State constituency					
Parliamentary constituency	1967–1974	1974–1985	1985–1995	1995–2004	2004–2020	2020–present
Lahad Datu						Kunak
Lahad Datu						Tungku
Lahad Datu						Segama
Lahad Datu						Silam

=== Historical boundaries ===
State Constituency	Area
State Constituency	2019
Kunak	Kampung Getah; Kampung Kadazan; Kampung Simpang Empat; Kunak; Madai
Tungku	FELDA Sahabat; Hamparan Badai; Makau; Pulau Tambisan; Silabukan
Segama	Bukit Belacon; Tabanac; Taman Mewah; Taman Warisan; Ulu Segama
Silam	Kampung Dewata; Lahad Datu; Sepagaya; Silam; Taman Fajar

=== Current state assembly members ===
No.	State Constituency	Member	Coalition (Party)
N60	Tungku	Assaffal P. Alian	WARISAN
N61	Segama	Muhammad Abdul Karim	WARISAN
N62	Silam	Yusof Apdal	WARISAN
N63	Kunak	Anil Jeet Singh	BN (UMNO)

=== Local governments & postcodes ===
No.	State Constituency	Local Government	Postcode
N60	Tungku	Kinabatangan District Council (Tambisan area); Lahad Datu District Council	91100, 91150 Lahad Datu; 91200 Kunak
N61	Segama	Lahad Datu District Council	91100, 91150 Lahad Datu; 91200 Kunak
N62	Silam	Lahad Datu District Council	91100, 91150 Lahad Datu; 91200 Kunak
N63	Kunak	Kunak District Council	91100, 91150 Lahad Datu; 91200 Kunak

== Election results ==
Malaysian general election, 2022
Party	Candidate	Votes	%
Heritage	Yusof Apdal	27,116	46.64
BN	Maizatul Akmam Alawi	22,740	39.11
PH	Oscar Sia Yu Hock	8,289	14.26
Total valid votes		58,145	100.00
Total rejected ballots		828	
Unreturned ballots		194	
Turnout		59,167	58.00
Registered electors		100,256	
Majority		4,376	7.53
This was a new constituency created.
Source(s) https://lom.agc.gov.my/ilims/upload/portal/akta/outputp/1753262/PUB619_2022.pdf
