= Bakubang Island =

Island in Malaysia

- Interactive map of Bakubang Island

Geography
- Coordinates: 4°46′20″N 118°18′25″E

Administration
- Malaysia
- State: Sabah
- Division: Tawau
- District: Kunak

Bakubang Island (Malay: Pulau Bakubang) is an island located near Kunak in Sabah, Malaysia.

== See also ==
- List of islands of Malaysia
