= Minister of Tourism, Arts and Culture (Malaysia) =

Government minister of Malaysia

- Menteri Pelancongan, Seni dan Budaya

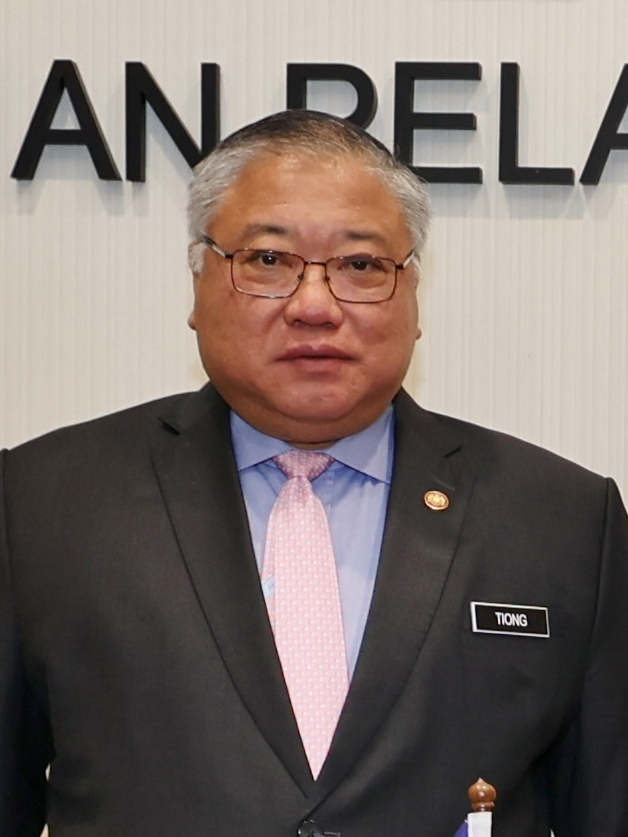
- Incumbent; Tiong King Sing since 3 December 2022
- Ministry of Tourism, Arts and Culture
- Style: Yang Berhormat Menteri (The Honourable Minister)
- Abbreviation: MOTAC
- Member of: Cabinet of Malaysia
- Reports to: Parliament of Malaysia
- Seat: Putrajaya
- Appointer: Yang di-Pertuan Agong on the recommendation of the Prime Minister of Malaysia
- Formation: 1973
- First holder: Ali Ahmad (Minister of Culture, Youth and Sports)
- Deputy: Chiew Choon Man
- Website: www.motac.gov.my

The Minister of Tourism, Arts and Culture has been Tiong King Sing since 3 December 2022. The minister is supported by Deputy Minister of Tourism, Arts and Culture, Chiew Choon Man since 17 December 2025. The minister administers the portfolio through the Ministry of Tourism, Arts and Culture.

== List of ministers ==
=== Tourism ===
The following individuals have been appointed as Minister of Tourism, or any of its precedent titles:

Political party: Alliance/BN WARISAN GPS

Portrait	Name (Birth–Death) Constituency	Political party	Title	Took office	Left office	Deputy Minister	Prime Minister (Cabinet)
	Sabbaruddin Chik (1941–2021); MP for Temerloh	BN (UMNO)	Minister of Culture, Arts and Tourism	20 May 1987	7 January 1999	Vacant (1987–1989); Ng Cheng Kuai (1989–1990); Chan Kong Choy (1990–1995); Teng Gaik Kuan (1995–1999)	Mahathir Mohamad (III • IV • V)
	Abdul Kadir Sheikh Fadzir (b. 1939); MP for Kulim-Bandar Baharu	BN (UMNO)	Minister of Culture, Arts and Tourism	7 January 1999	26 March 2004	Teng Gaik Kuan (1999); Fu Ah Kow (1999–2004)	Mahathir Mohamad (V • VI); Abdullah Ahmad Badawi (I)
	Leo Michael Toyad (b. 1950); MP for Mukah	BN (PBB)	Minister of Tourism	27 March 2004	14 February 2006	Wong Kam Hoong	Abdullah Ahmad Badawi (II)
	Tengku Adnan Tengku Mansor (b. 1950); MP for Putrajaya	BN (UMNO)	Minister of Tourism	14 February 2006	18 March 2008	Wong Kam Hoong	Abdullah Ahmad Badawi (II)
	Azalina Othman Said (b. 1963); MP for Pengerang	BN (UMNO)	Minister of Tourism	19 March 2008	9 April 2009	Teng Boon Soon	Abdullah Ahmad Badawi (III)
	Ng Yen Yen (b. 1946); MP for Raub	BN (MCA)	Minister of Tourism	10 April 2009	15 May 2013	Sulaiman Abdul Rahman Taib (2009); James Dawos Mamit (2009–2013)	Najib Razak (I)
	Mohamed Nazri Abdul Aziz (b. 1954); MP for Padang Rengas	BN (UMNO)	Minister of Tourism and Culture	16 May 2013	9 May 2018	Vacant (2013–2015); Mas Ermieyati Samsudin (2015–2018)	Najib Razak (II)
	Mohammadin Ketapi (b. 1957); MP for Lahad Datu	WARISAN	Minister of Tourism, Arts and Culture	2 July 2018	24 February 2020	Muhammad Bakhtiar Wan Chik	Mahathir Mohamad (VII)
	Nancy Shukri (b. 1961); MP for Batang Sadong	GPS (PBB)	Minister of Tourism, Arts and Culture	10 March 2020	24 November 2022	Jeffrey Kitingan (2020); Guan Dee Koh Hoi (2020–2021); Edmund Santhara Kumar Ramanaidu (2021–2022)	Muhyiddin Yassin (I); Ismail Sabri Yaakob (I)
	Tiong King Sing (b. 1961); MP for Bintulu	GPS (PDP)	Minister of Tourism, Arts and Culture	3 December 2022	Incumbent	Khairul Firdaus Akbar Khan (2022–2025); Chiew Choon Man (2025–present)	Anwar Ibrahim (I)

=== Arts ===
The following individuals have been appointed as Minister of Arts, or any of its precedent titles:

Political party: Alliance/BN WARISAN (allied with Pakatan Harapan) GPS

Portrait	Name (Birth–Death) Constituency	Political party	Title	Took office	Left office	Deputy Minister	Prime Minister (Cabinet)
	Sabbaruddin Chik (1941–2021); MP for Temerloh	BN (UMNO)	Minister of Culture, Arts and Tourism	20 May 1987	7 January 1999	Vacant (1987–1989); Ng Cheng Kuai (1989–1990); Chan Kong Choy (1990–1995); Teng Gaik Kuan (1995–1999)	Mahathir Mohamad (III • IV • V)
	Abdul Kadir Sheikh Fadzir (b. 1939); MP for Kulim-Bandar Baharu	BN (UMNO)	Minister of Culture, Arts and Tourism	7 January 1999	26 March 2004	Teng Gaik Kuan (1999); Fu Ah Kow (1999–2004)	Mahathir Mohamad (V • VI); Abdullah Ahmad Badawi (I)
	Rais Yatim (b. 1942); MP for Jelebu	BN (UMNO)	Minister of Arts, Culture and Heritage	27 March 2004	18 March 2008	Wong Kam Hoong	Abdullah Ahmad Badawi (II)
	Shafie Apdal (b. 1956); MP for Semporna	BN (UMNO)	Minister of National Unity, Arts, Culture and Heritage	19 March 2008	9 April 2009	Teng Boon Soon	Abdullah Ahmad Badawi (III)
	Rais Yatim (b. 1942); MP for Jelebu	BN (UMNO)	Minister of Information, Communications, Arts and Culture	10 April 2009	15 May 2013	Heng Sai Kie (2009–2010); Joseph Salang Gandum (2009–2013); Maglin Dennis d'Cruz (2010–2013)	Najib Razak (I)
	Mohammadin Ketapi (b. 1957); MP for Lahad Datu	WARISAN	Minister of Tourism, Arts and Culture	2 July 2018	24 February 2020	Muhammad Bakhtiar Wan Chik	Mahathir Mohamad (VII)
	Nancy Shukri (b. 1961); MP for Batang Sadong	GPS (PBB)	Minister of Tourism, Arts and Culture	10 March 2020	24 November 2022	Jeffrey Kitingan (2020); Guan Dee Koh Hoi (2020–2021); Edmund Santhara Kumar Ramanaidu (2021–2022)	Muhyiddin Yassin (I); Ismail Sabri Yaakob (I)
	Tiong King Sing (b. 1961); MP for Bintulu	GPS (PDP)	Minister of Tourism, Arts and Culture	3 December 2022	Incumbent	Khairul Firdaus Akbar Khan (2022–2025); Chiew Choon Man (2025–present)	Anwar Ibrahim (I)

=== Culture ===
The following individuals have been appointed as Minister of Culture, or any of its precedent titles:

Political party: Alliance/BN WARISAN (allied with Pakatan Harapan) GPS

Portrait	Name (Birth–Death) Constituency	Political party	Title	Took office	Left office	Deputy Minister	Prime Minister (Cabinet)
	Ali Ahmad (1930–1977); MP for Pontian Selatan (1973-1974); MP for Pontian (1974-1976)	BN (UMNO)	Minister of Culture, Youth and Sports	1973	1976	Vacant (1973–1976); Neo Yee Pan (1976); Vacant (1976)	Abdul Razak Hussein (I • II); Hussein Onn (I)
	Abdul Samad Idris (1923–2003); MP for Jelebu	BN (UMNO)	Minister of Culture, Youth and Sports	1976	1980	Mak Hon Kam (1976–1978); Chin Hon Ngian (1978–1980)	Hussein Onn (I • II)
	Mokhtar Hashim (1942–2020); MP for Tampin	BN (UMNO)	Minister of Culture, Youth and Sports	1980	1983	Chin Hon Ngian (1981–1982); Rosemary Chow Poh Keng (1982–1983)	Hussein Onn (II); Mahathir Mohamad (I • II)
	Anwar Ibrahim (b. 1947); MP for Permatang Pauh	BN (UMNO)	Minister of Culture, Youth and Sports	1983	1984	Rosemary Chow Poh Keng	Mahathir Mohamad (II)
	Sulaiman Daud (1933–2010); MP for Santubong	BN (PBB)	Minister of Culture, Youth and Sports	1984	1986	Vacant (1984–1986); Rosemary Chow Poh Keng (1985–1986)	Mahathir Mohamad (II)
	Najib Razak (b. 1953); MP for Pekan	BN (UMNO)	Minister of Culture, Youth and Sports	1986	1987	Wang Choon Wing	Mahathir Mohamad (III)
	Sabbaruddin Chik (1941–2021); MP for Temerloh	BN (UMNO)	Minister of Culture, Arts and Tourism	20 May 1987	7 January 1999	Vacant (1987–1989); Ng Cheng Kuai (1989–1990); Chan Kong Choy (1990–1995); Teng Gaik Kuan (1995–1999)	Mahathir Mohamad (III • IV • V)
	Abdul Kadir Sheikh Fadzir (b. 1939); MP for Kulim-Bandar Baharu	BN (UMNO)	Minister of Culture, Arts and Tourism	7 January 1999	26 March 2004	Teng Gaik Kuan (1999); Fu Ah Kow (1999–2004)	Mahathir Mohamad (V • VI); Abdullah Ahmad Badawi (I)
	Rais Yatim (b. 1942); MP for Jelebu	BN (UMNO)	Minister of Arts, Culture and Heritage	27 March 2004	18 March 2008	Wong Kam Hoong	Abdullah Ahmad Badawi (II)
	Shafie Apdal (b. 1956); MP for Semporna	BN (UMNO)	Minister of National Unity, Arts, Culture and Heritage	19 March 2008	9 April 2009	Teng Boon Soon	Abdullah Ahmad Badawi (III)
	Rais Yatim (b. 1942); MP for Jelebu	BN (UMNO)	Minister of Information, Communications, Arts and Culture; Minister of Information, Communications and Culture	10 April 2009	15 May 2013	Heng Sai Kie (2009–2010); Joseph Salang Gandum (2009–2013); Maglin Dennis d'Cruz (2010–2013)	Najib Razak (I)
	Mohamed Nazri Abdul Aziz (b. 1954); MP for Padang Rengas	BN (UMNO)	Minister of Tourism and Culture	16 May 2013	9 May 2018	Vacant (2013–2015); Mas Ermieyati Samsudin (2015–2018)	Najib Razak (II)
	Mohammadin Ketapi (b. 1957); MP for Lahad Datu	WARISAN	Minister of Tourism, Arts and Culture	2 July 2018	24 February 2020	Muhammad Bakhtiar Wan Chik	Mahathir Mohamad (VII)
	Nancy Shukri (b. 1961); MP for Batang Sadong	GPS (PBB)	Minister of Tourism, Arts and Culture	10 March 2020	24 November 2022	Jeffrey Kitingan (2020); Guan Dee Koh Hoi (2020–2021); Edmund Santhara Kumar Ramanaidu (2021–2022)	Muhyiddin Yassin (I); Ismail Sabri Yaakob (I)
	Tiong King Sing (b. 1961); MP for Bintulu	GPS (PDP)	Minister of Tourism, Arts and Culture	3 December 2022	Incumbent	Khairul Firdaus Akbar Khan (2022–2025); Chiew Choon Man (2025–present)	Anwar Ibrahim (I)

=== Heritage ===
The following individuals have been appointed as Minister of Heritage, or any of its precedent titles:

Political party: BN

Portrait	Name (Birth–Death) Constituency	Political party	Title	Took office	Left office	Deputy Minister	Prime Minister (Cabinet)
	Rais Yatim (b. 1942); MP for Jelebu	BN (UMNO)	Minister of Arts, Culture and Heritage	27 March 2004	18 March 2008	Wong Kam Hoong	Abdullah Ahmad Badawi (II)
	Shafie Apdal (b. 1956); MP for Semporna	BN (UMNO)	Minister of National Unity, Arts, Culture and Heritage	19 March 2008	9 April 2009	Teng Boon Soon	Abdullah Ahmad Badawi (III)
