= Dumi Pg Masdal =

Malaysian politician

Yang Berhormat Tuan Dumi Pg Masdal ASDK MLA
- دومي بن ڤڠيران ماسدال

State Assistant Minister of Rural Development of Sabah
- In office 16 May 2018 – 29 September 2020 Serving with Rasinin Kautis
- Governor: Juhar Mahiruddin
- Chief Minister: Shafie Apdal
- Minister: Ewon Benedick
- Preceded by: Nilwan Kabang
- Succeeded by: Harun Durabi
- Constituency: Lahad Datu (2018–2019); Silam (2019–2020)

Member of the Sabah State Legislative Assembly for Silam
- In office 10 October 2019 – 29 November 2025
- Preceded by: Position established
- Succeeded by: Yusof Apdal (WARISAN)
- Majority: 1,542 (2020)

Member of the Sabah State Legislative Assembly for Lahad Datu
- In office 9 May 2018 – 10 October 2019
- Preceded by: Yusof Apdal (BN–UMNO)
- Succeeded by: Position abolished
- Majority: 2,932 (2018)

Personal details
- Born: Dumi bin Pg Masdal; 5 March 1956 (age 70) Silam, Lahad Datu, Crown Colony of North Borneo (now Sabah, Malaysia)
- Citizenship: Malaysian
- Party: Heritage Party (WARISAN)
- Spouse: Lendungan Adiman
- Occupation: Politician

Dumi bin Pg Masdal (born 5 March 1956) is a Malaysian politician who has served as Member of the Sabah State Legislative Assembly (MLA) for Silam since October 2019. He served as the State Assistant Minister of Rural Development of Sabah in the Heritage Party (WARISAN) state administration under former Chief Minister Shafie Apdal and former Minister Ewon Benedick from May 2018 to the collapse of the WARISAN state administration in September 2020 and MLA for Lahad Datu from May 2018 to October 2019. He is a member of WARISAN.

== Election results ==
Sabah State Legislative Assembly
Year	Constituency		Votes	Pct	Opponent(s)	Votes	Pct	Ballots cast	Majority	Turnout
2018	N50 Lahad Datu	Dumi Pg Masdal (WARISAN)	11,304	55.58%	Mohammad Yusof Apdal (UMNO)	8,372	41.16%	20,834	2,932	72.70%
2018	N50 Lahad Datu	Dumi Pg Masdal (WARISAN)	11,304	55.58%	Wong Yu Chin (PHRS)	663	3.26%	20,834	2,932	72.70%
2020	N62 Silam	Dumi Pg Masdal (WARISAN)	5,200	55.40%	Abdul Hakim Gulam Hassan (BERSATU)	3,658	38.97%	9,386	1,542	53.96%
2020	N62 Silam	Dumi Pg Masdal (WARISAN)	5,200	55.40%	Matusin Sunsang (PCS)	196	2.09%	9,386	1,542	53.96%
2020	N62 Silam	Dumi Pg Masdal (WARISAN)	5,200	55.40%	Erwan Johan (PPRS)	156	1.66%	9,386	1,542	53.96%
2020	N62 Silam	Dumi Pg Masdal (WARISAN)	5,200	55.40%	Ahmad Tiong (GAGASAN)	122	1.30%	9,386	1,542	53.96%
2020	N62 Silam	Dumi Pg Masdal (WARISAN)	5,200	55.40%	Mohammad Hamdan Abdullah (USNO Baru)	54	0.58%	9,386	1,542	53.96%

== Honours ==
- Sabah
  - Companion of the Order of Kinabalu (ASDK) (2018)
