= Segamat (disambiguation) =

Segamat is a district in the Malaysian state of Johor.

Segamat may also refer to:

- MV Segamat, coaster ship formerly named Empire Seaview
- Segamat (federal constituency), federal constituency in the Segamat district
- Segamat (town), town in the Segamat district

== See also ==
- Segama, state constituency in Sabah, Malaysia
