= Mohamaddin Ketapi =

Malaysian politician

Yang Berbahagia Datuk Mohamaddin Ketapi PGDK
- محمد دين کتاڤي
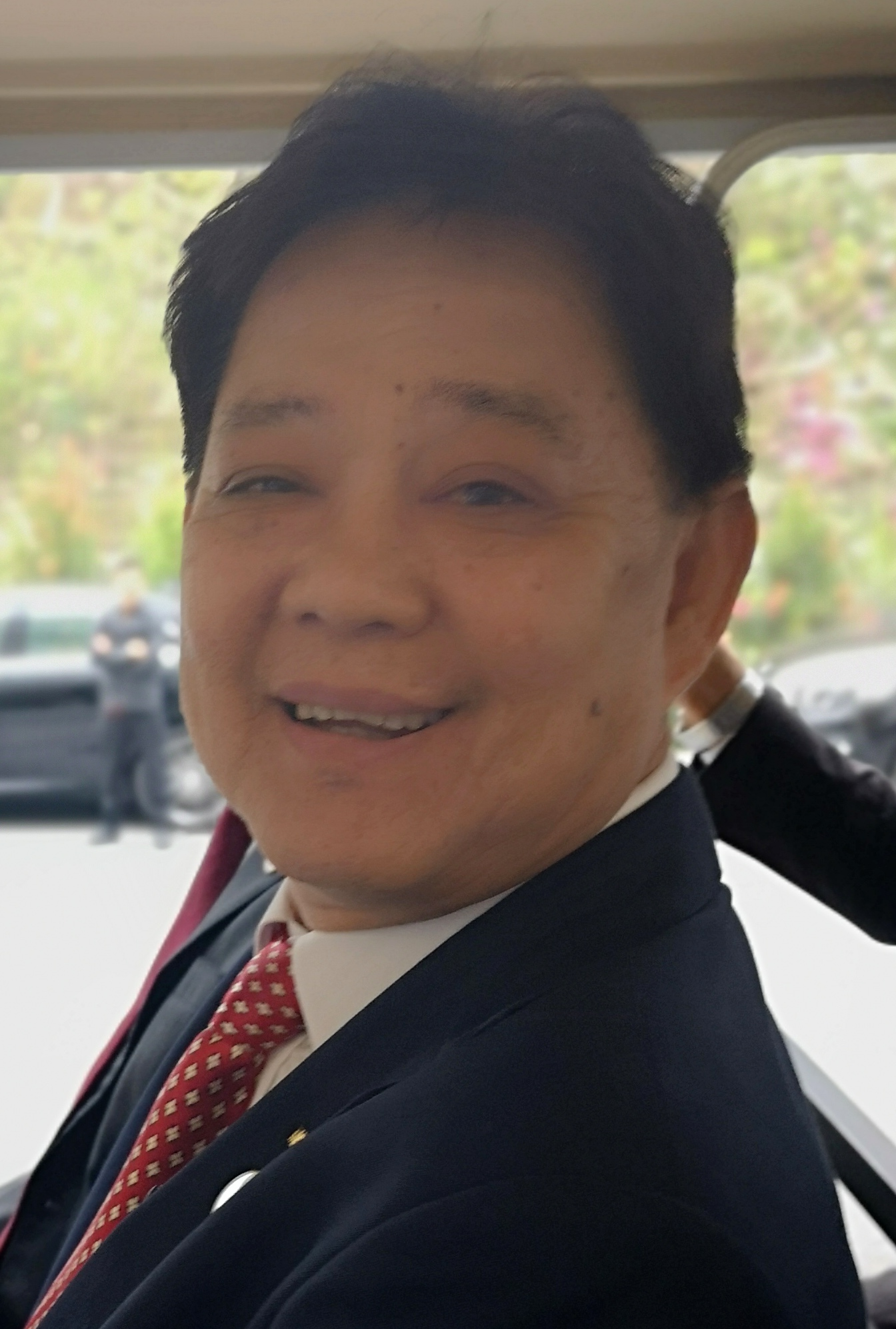

Minister of Tourism, Arts and Culture
- In office 2 July 2018 – 24 February 2020
- Monarchs: Muhammad V (2018–2019); Abdullah (2019–2020)
- Prime Minister: Mahathir Mohamad
- Deputy: Muhammad Bakhtiar Wan Chik
- Preceded by: Mohamed Nazri Abdul Aziz (Minister of Tourism and Culture)
- Succeeded by: Nancy Shukri
- Constituency: Silam (2018–2019); Lahad Datu (2019–2020)

State Assistant Minister of Industrial and Rural Development of Sabah
- In office 1986–1990
- Governor: Mohamad Adnan Robert (1986); Mohammad Said Keruak (1987–1990)
- Chief Minister: Joseph Pairin Kitingan
- Constituency: Lahad Datu

Member of the Malaysian Parliament for Lahad Datu
- In office 10 October 2019 – 19 November 2022
- Preceded by: Position established
- Succeeded by: Yusof Apdal (WARISAN)

Member of the Malaysian Parliament for Silam
- In office 9 May 2018 – 10 October 2019
- Preceded by: Nasrun Mansur (BN–UMNO)
- Succeeded by: Position abolished
- Majority: 6,401 (2018)

Member of the Sabah State Legislative Assembly for Segama
- Incumbent
- Assumed office 26 September 2020
- Preceded by: Position established
- Succeeded by: Muhammad Abdul Karim
- Majority: 2,168 (2018)

Member of the Sabah State Legislative Assembly for Lahad Datu
- In office 3 August 1986 – 21 October 1990
- Preceded by: Mohamad Sunoh Marso (BN–BERJAYA)
- Succeeded by: Askalani Abdul Rahim (BN–UMNO)
- Majority: 793 (1986)

1st State Chairman of the Parti Bangsa Malaysia of Sabah
- In office 28 August 2022 – 6 January 2023
- President: Larry Sng Wei Shien
- Preceded by: Position established
- Succeeded by: Jupperi Lenson

Faction represented in Dewan Rakyat
- 2018–2021: Sabah Heritage Party
- Oct–Nov 2021 June–Aug 2022: Independent
- 2021–2022: Perikatan Nasional
- Aug 2022–Nov 2022: Parti Bangsa Malaysia

Faction represented in Sabah State Legislative Assembly
- 1986–1990: United Sabah Party
- 2020–2021: Sabah Heritage Party
- Oct–Nov 2021 June–Aug 2022: Independent
- 2021–2022: Perikatan Nasional; Gabungan Rakyat Sabah
- 2022–2023: Parti Bangsa Malaysia
- 2023–: Barisan Nasional

Personal details
- Born: Mohamaddin bin Ketapi; 3 June 1957 (age 69) Lahad Datu, Crown Colony of North Borneo (now Sabah, Malaysia)
- Citizenship: Malaysian
- Party: United Sabah Party (PBS) (1985–2018); Sabah Heritage Party (WARISAN) (2018–2021); Independent (IND) (Oct–Nov 2021, June–Aug 2022); Malaysian United Indigenous Party (BERSATU) (2021–2022); Parti Bangsa Malaysia (PBM) (2022–2023); United Malays National Organisation (UMNO) (since 2023)
- Other political affiliations: Pakatan Harapan (PH) (aligned:2018–2021); Perikatan Nasional (PN) (2021–2022, aligned:Oct–Nov 2021, June–Nov 2022); Barisan Nasional (BN) (since 2023, aligned:2021–2023); Gabungan Rakyat Sabah (GRS) (2021–2022, aligned:Oct–Nov 2021, June 2022–Jan 2023)
- Spouse: Zarinah Muhammad Ibrahim
- Education: University of Buckingham
- Occupation: Politician

Datuk Mohamaddin bin Ketapi (born 3 June 1957) is a Malaysian politician who has served as Member of the Sabah State Legislative Assembly (MLA) for Segama since September 2020. He served as the Minister of Tourism, Arts and Culture in the Pakatan Harapan (PH) administration under former Prime Minister Mahathir Mohamad from July 2018 to the collapse of the PH administration in February 2020. He served as the Member of Parliament (MP) for Lahad Datu from October 2019 to November 2022 and for Silam from May 2018 to October 2019 as well as MLA for Lahad Datu from August 1986 to October 1990. He also served as the State Assistant Minister of Industrial and Rural Development of Sabah in the United Sabah Party (PBS) state administration under former Chief Minister Joseph Pairin Kitingan from 1986 to 1990. He is a member of the United Malays National Organisation (UMNO), a component party of the Barisan Nasional (BN) coalition. He was also member of the Parti Bangsa Malaysia (PBM), member of the Malaysian United Indigenous Party (BERSATU), a component party of the ruling Gabungan Rakyat Sabah (GRS) and Perikatan Nasional (PN) coalitions, member of the Heritage Party (WARISAN) and member of the PBS. He has also served as the 1st State Chairman of PBM of Sabah from August 2022 to his resignation from the party in January 2023. On 30 October 2021, he left WARISAN and became independent in support for GRS. Later, he officially became a member of BERSATU on 26 November 2021. However on 28 June 2022, he left BERSATU and became independent again in support for BN and GRS ruling coalitions after joining it only seven months prior. He then joined PBM and was appointed as its State Chairman of Sabah exactly two months later after leaving BERSATU on 28 August 2022. On 6 January 2023, he left PBM and joined UMNO and supported its withdrawal of support for GRS that triggered the 2023 Sabah political crisis.

== Political career ==
Mohamaddin supports the curfew that was imposed in eastern Sabah to combat the rampant cross border crimes perpetrated by bandits from the neighbouring southern Philippines.

== Controversy and Issue ==
Mohamaddin Ketapi was speaking at a campaign for the 2020 Sabah state election which he allegedly insulted Malaysian security forces who fought during the 2013 Lahad Datu standoff by saying that the fight between 235 militants from the Philippines and the Malaysian army was just a 'theatre play'.

Following public backlash, Mohamaddin offered his apology but not before asserting that the speech was taken out of context.

== Elections ==
=== 2018 general election ===
In the 2018 election, Sabah Heritage Party (WARISAN) fielded him to contest the Silam parliamentary seat, facing the incumbent candidate Nasrun Mansur from the United Malays National Organisation (UMNO) and subsequently won.

== Election results ==
Parliament of Malaysia
Year	Constituency	Candidate	Votes	Pct	Opponent(s)	Votes	Pct	Ballots cast	Majority	Turnout
1990	P152 Silam	Mohamaddin Ketapi (IND)	8,269	44.27%	Railey Jeffrey (USNO)	10,322	55.26%	18,860	2,053	58.91%
1990	P152 Silam	Mohamaddin Ketapi (IND)	8,269	44.27%	Hassan Malempeng (IND)	89	0.48%	18,860	2,053	58.91%
2018	P188 Silam	Mohamaddin Ketapi (WARISAN)	23,352	54.26%	Nasrun Mansur (UMNO)	16,951	39.38%	44,119	6,401	72.68%
2018	P188 Silam	Mohamaddin Ketapi (WARISAN)	23,352	54.26%	Ramli Pataruddin (PAS)	1,431	0.93%	44,119	6,401	72.68%
2018	P188 Silam	Mohamaddin Ketapi (WARISAN)	23,352	54.26%	Kasuari Ariff (IND)	1,306	0.91%	44,119	6,401	72.68%

Sabah State Legislative Assembly
Year	Constituency	Candidate	Votes	Pct	Opponent(s)	Votes	Pct	Ballots cast	Majority	Turnout
1986	N45 Lahad Datu	Mohamaddin Ketapi (PBS)	4,556	48.88%	Gamut Ismail (BERJAYA)	3,763	40.38%	9,429	793	71.48%
1986	N45 Lahad Datu	Mohamaddin Ketapi (PBS)	4,556	48.88%	Datu Nasrun Datu Mansur (IND)	867	9.30%	9,429	793	71.48%
1986	N45 Lahad Datu	Mohamaddin Ketapi (PBS)	4,556	48.88%	Kasuari Ariff (IND)	85	0.91%	9,429	793	71.48%
1986	N45 Lahad Datu	Mohamaddin Ketapi (PBS)	4,556	48.88%	Mohammad Kama (IND)	49	0.53%	9,429	793	71.48%
1990	N45 Lahad Datu	Mohamaddin Ketapi (PBS)	4,781	41.40%	Askalani Abdul Rahim (USNO)	5,054	43.77%	11,708	273	69.69%
1990	N45 Lahad Datu	Mohamaddin Ketapi (PBS)	4,781	41.40%	Tutik Garuda (IND)	831	7.20%	11,708	273	69.69%
1990	N45 Lahad Datu	Mohamaddin Ketapi (PBS)	4,781	41.40%	Francis Chin Vun Siew (BERJAYA)	694	6.01%	11,708	273	69.69%
1990	N45 Lahad Datu	Mohamaddin Ketapi (PBS)	4,781	41.40%	Pang Yee Vun (LDP)	187	1.62%	11,708	273	69.69%
2020	N61 Segama	Mohamaddin Ketapi (WARISAN)	4,864	52.41%	Aljen Johnny (BERSATU)	2,696	29.06%	9,280	2,168	55.99%
2020	N61 Segama	Mohamaddin Ketapi (WARISAN)	4,864	52.41%	Kamarudin Mohmad Chinki (PCS)	570	6.14%	9,280	2,168	55.99%
2020	N61 Segama	Mohamaddin Ketapi (WARISAN)	4,864	52.41%	Kamis Burhan (IND)	510	5.50%	9,280	2,168	55.99%
2020	N61 Segama	Mohamaddin Ketapi (WARISAN)	4,864	52.41%	Sahidin Rabaha (PPRS)	399	4.30%	9,280	2,168	55.99%
2020	N61 Segama	Mohamaddin Ketapi (WARISAN)	4,864	52.41%	Mohd Basari Abdul Gapar (GAGASAN)	135	1.45%	9,280	2,168	55.99%
2020	N61 Segama	Mohamaddin Ketapi (WARISAN)	4,864	52.41%	Nicholas Voo Vune Kett (LDP)	67	0.72%	9,280	2,168	55.99%
2020	N61 Segama	Mohamaddin Ketapi (WARISAN)	4,864	52.41%	Jikamisah Abdul Salam (USNO Baru)	39	0.42%	9,280	2,168	55.99%

== Honours ==
- Sabah
  - Commander of the Order of Kinabalu (PGDK) – Datuk (2018)
