= Yusof Apdal =

Malaysian politician (born 1960)

Yang Berhormat Dato' Mohammad Yusof Apdal DIMP MP MLA
- محمّد يوسف أڤضل
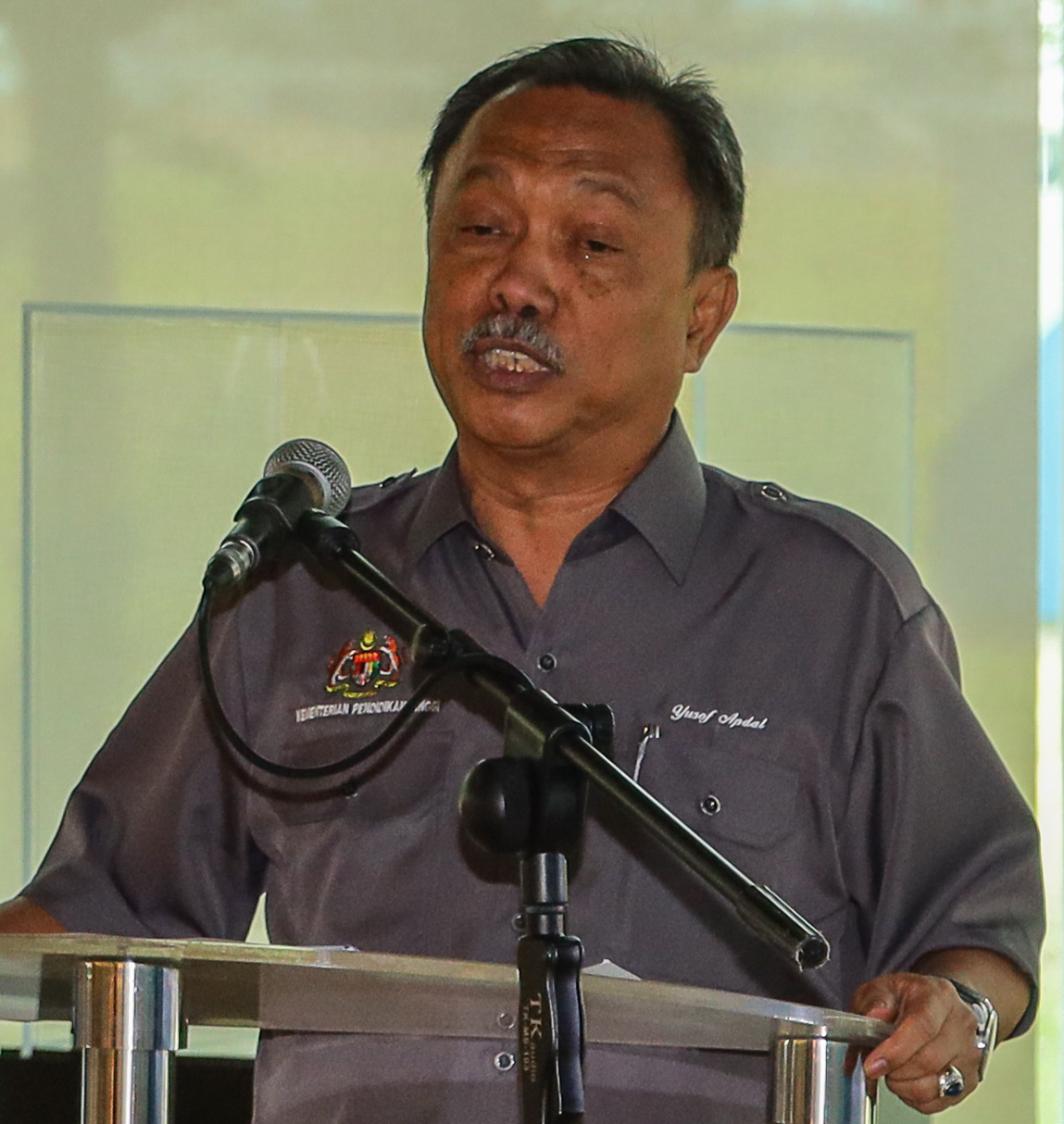
- Yusof in 2023

Deputy Minister of Science, Technology and Innovation
- Incumbent
- Assumed office 12 December 2023
- Monarchs: Abdullah (2023–2024); Ibrahim (since 2024)
- Prime Minister: Anwar Ibrahim
- Minister: Chang Lih Kang
- Preceded by: Arthur Joseph Kurup
- Constituency: Lahad Datu

Deputy Minister of Higher Education
- In office 10 December 2022 – 12 December 2023
- Monarch: Abdullah
- Prime Minister: Anwar Ibrahim
- Minister: Mohamed Khaled Nordin
- Preceded by: Ahmad Masrizal Muhammad
- Succeeded by: Mustapha Sakmud
- Constituency: Lahad Datu

Member of the Malaysian Parliament for Lahad Datu
- Incumbent
- Assumed office 19 November 2022
- Preceded by: Mohamaddin Ketapi (WARISAN)
- Majority: 4,376 (2022)

Member of the Sabah State Legislative Assembly for Silam
- Incumbent
- Assumed office 29 November 2025
- Preceded by: Dumi Pg Masdal (WARISAN)
- Majority: 1,257 (2025)

Member of the Sabah State Legislative Assembly for Lahad Datu
- In office 5 May 2013 – 9 May 2018
- Preceded by: Nasrun Mansur (BN–UMNO)
- Succeeded by: Dumi Pg Masdal (WARISAN)
- Majority: 8,415 (2013)

Personal details
- Born: Mohammad Yusof bin Apdal; 4 January 1960 (age 66) Semporna, Crown Colony of North Borneo (now Sabah, Malaysia)
- Party: United Malays National Organisation of Sabah (Sabah UMNO) (2000–2018); Heritage Party (WARISAN) (since 2018)
- Other political affiliations: Barisan Nasional (BN) (2000–2018)
- Spouse: Saleha Sakaran
- Relations: Shafie Apdal (Elder brother); Sakaran Dandai (Maternal uncle and Father-in-law)
- Education: Open University Malaysia (DBA)
- Occupation: Politician

Mohammad Yusof bin Apdal (born 4 January 1960) is a Malaysian politician who has served as the Deputy Minister of Science, Technology and Innovation in the Unity Government administration under Prime Minister Anwar Ibrahim and Minister Chang Lih Kang since December 2023 and the Member of Parliament (MP) for Lahad Datu since November 2022. He served as the Deputy Minister of Higher Education prior to the 2023 cabinet reshuffle under Minister Mohamed Khaled Nordin from December 2022 to December 2023 as well as the Member of the Sabah State Legislative Assembly (MLA) for Lahad Datu from May 2013 to May 2018. He is a member and the Deputy Division Chief of Lahad Datu of the Heritage Party (WARISAN) and also the younger brother of the President of WARISAN, MP for Semporna and MLA for Senallang, Shafie Apdal.

== Election results ==
Sabah State Legislative Assembly
Year	Constituency	Candidate	Votes	Pct	Opponent(s)	Votes	Pct	Ballots cast	Majority	Turnout
2013	N50 Lahad Datu	Mohammad Yusof Apdal (Sabah UMNO)	12,949	69.11%	Abdul Hamid Awong (PKR)	4,534	24.20%	19,187	8,415	76.04%
2013	N50 Lahad Datu	Mohammad Yusof Apdal (Sabah UMNO)	12,949	69.11%	Aliandu Enjil (SAPP)	912	4.87%	19,187	8,415	76.04%
2013	N50 Lahad Datu	Mohammad Yusof Apdal (Sabah UMNO)	12,949	69.11%	Ariffin Hamid (STAR)	341	1.82%	19,187	8,415	76.04%
2018	N50 Lahad Datu	Mohammad Yusof Apdal (Sabah UMNO)	8,372	41.16%	Dumi Pg Masdal (WARISAN)	11,304	55.58%	20,834	2,932	72.70%
2018	N50 Lahad Datu	Mohammad Yusof Apdal (Sabah UMNO)	8,372	41.16%	Wong Yu Chin (PHRS)	663	3.26%	20,834	2,932	72.70%
2025	N62 Silam	Mohammad Yusof Apdal (WARISAN)	7,116	43.38%	Mizma Appehdullah (GAGASAN)	5,859	35.72%	16,655	1,257	59.00%
2025	N62 Silam	Mohammad Yusof Apdal (WARISAN)	7,116	43.38%	Sharif Musa Sharif Mabul (Sabah UMNO)	1,835	11.19%	16,655	1,257	59.00%
2025	N62 Silam	Mohammad Yusof Apdal (WARISAN)	7,116	43.38%	Borkes @ Balkis Kalinggalan (Sabah BERSATU)	636	3.88%	16,655	1,257	59.00%
2025	N62 Silam	Mohammad Yusof Apdal (WARISAN)	7,116	43.38%	Abd Halim Sidek Gulam Hassan (Note: Abd Halim withdrew himself from the election, but his name remained on the ballot as he withdrew after Nomination Day.) (PKR)	390	2.38%	16,655	1,257	59.00%
2025	N62 Silam	Mohammad Yusof Apdal (WARISAN)	7,116	43.38%	Brahim Bisel (IMPIAN)	275	1.68%	16,655	1,257	59.00%
2025	N62 Silam	Mohammad Yusof Apdal (WARISAN)	7,116	43.38%	Amat Kawoh @ Abd Rahman (IND)	172	1.05%	16,655	1,257	59.00%
2025	N62 Silam	Mohammad Yusof Apdal (WARISAN)	7,116	43.38%	Mohammad Enriquez (SPP)	99	0.60%	16,655	1,257	59.00%
2025	N62 Silam	Mohammad Yusof Apdal (WARISAN)	7,116	43.38%	Mohd Syafiq Iqhmal Saharudin (PKS)	21	0.13%	16,655	1,257	59.00%

Parliament of Malaysia
Year	Constituency	Candidate	Votes	Pct	Opponent(s)	Votes	Pct	Ballots cast	Majority	Turnout
2022	P188 Lahad Datu	Mohammad Yusof Apdal (WARISAN)	27,116	46.64%	Maizatul Akmam Alawi (Sabah UMNO)	22,740	39.11%	59,167	4,376	58.00%
2022	P188 Lahad Datu	Mohammad Yusof Apdal (WARISAN)	27,116	46.64%	Oscar Sia Yu Hock (DAP)	8,289	14.26%	59,167	4,376	58.00%

== Honours ==
=== Honours of Malaysia ===
- Malaysia
  - Recipient of the 17th Yang di-Pertuan Agong Installation Medal (2025)
- Pahang
  - Knight Companion of the Order of the Crown of Pahang (DIMP) – Dato' (2010)
