= Segama =

Segama (N61)
Sabah constituency

State constituency
- Legislature: Sabah State Legislative Assembly
MLA
Muhamamd Abdul Karim
Heritage
- Constituency created: 2019
- First contested: 2020
- Last contested: 2025

Demographics
- Electors (2025): 29,840

Segama is a state constituency in Sabah, Malaysia, that is represented in the Sabah State Legislative Assembly. This is one of the thirteen new state constituencies as result of approval from state legislative and Dewan Rakyat on 17 July 2019 and presenting for the first time for snap election

== Demographics ==
As of 2020, Segama has a population of 105,705 people.

Ethnic breakdown of Segama's electorate as of 2025
1. Muslim Bumiputera (66.0%)
2. Non-Muslim Bumiputera (17.0%)
3. Chinese (16.0%)
4. Other ethnicities (1.00%)

== History ==
=== Polling districts ===
According to the gazette issued on 31 October 2022, the Segama constituency has a total of 9 polling districts.

State constituency	Polling District	Code	Location
Segama (N61)	Belacon	188/61/01	SMK Segama
Segama (N61)	Dam Road	188/61/02	SMK Agasah
Segama (N61)	North Road	188/61/03	SK Lahad Datu II
Segama (N61)	Tengah Nipah	188/61/04	SK Binuang
Segama (N61)	Ulu Segama	188/61/05	SK Sandau
Segama (N61)	Segama	188/61/06	SJK (C) Kiau Shing
Segama (N61)	Tabanac	188/61/07	SK Lahad Datu IV
Segama (N61)	Singgahmata	188/61/08	SK Pekan
Segama (N61)	Jalan Segama	188/61/09	SJK (C) Yuk Choi

=== Representation history ===
Members of the Legislative Assembly for Segama
Assembly	No	Years	Member	Party
Constituency created from Sukau, Tungku and Lahad Datu
16th	N61	2020–2021	Mohammadin Ketapi	WARISAN
16th	N61	2021 - 2022	Mohammadin Ketapi	GRS (BERSATU)
16th	N61	2022	Mohammadin Ketapi	Independent
16th	N61	2022	Mohammadin Ketapi	PBM
16th	N61	2023–2025	Mohammadin Ketapi	BN (UMNO)
17th	N61	2025–present	Muhamamd Abdul Karim	WARISAN

== Election results ==
Sabah state election, 2025: Segama
Party	Candidate	Votes	%	∆%
Heritage	Muhammad Abdul Karim	7,325	42.61	▼7.91
PH	Romansa Laimin	3,267	19.01	▲19.01
SAPP	Yvonne Yong Yit Phung	2,318	13.48	▲13.48
Independent	Ali Afiandy Ali	2,195	12.77	▲12.77
Independent	Mohammadin Ketapi	1,644	9.56	▲9.56
Sabah Dream Party	Ehtisham Ur Rahman Mhaulaha	327	1.90	▲1.90
Independent	Norman Kasimin	114	0.66	▲0.66
Total valid votes		17,190		
Total rejected ballots		252		
Unreturned ballots		14		
Turnout		17,456	58.50	▲0.41
Registered electors		29,840		
Majority		4,058	23.60	▲1.08
Sabah Heritage Party hold		Swing		
Source(s) "RESULTS OF CONTESTED ELECTION AND STATEMENTS OF THE POLL AFTER THE OFFICIAL ADDITION OF VOTES" (PDF).

Sabah state election, 2020: Segama
Party	Candidate	Votes	%
Sabah Heritage Party	Mohammadin Ketapi	4,864	50.52
PN	Aljen Johnny	2,696	28.00
Love Sabah Party	Kamarudin Mohmad Chinki	570	5.92
Independent	Kamis Burhan	510	5.30
Sabah People's Unity Party	Sahidin Rabaha	399	4.14
GAGASAN	Basri Abd Gapar	135	1.40
LDP	Nicholas Voo Vune Kett	67	0.70
USNO (Baru)	Jikamisah Abdul Salam	39	0.40
Total valid votes		9,280	96.39
Total rejected ballots		304	3.16
Unreturned ballots		44	0.46
Turnout		9,628	58.09
Registered electors		16,575	
Majority		2,168	22.52
This was a new constituency created.
