= Assaffal P. Alian =

Malaysian politician (born 1964)

Yang Berhormat Tuan Assaffal P. Alian ASDK
- الصافّال ڤ عليان

State Assistant Minister of Tourism, Culture and Environment of Sabah
- In office 16 May 2018 – 29 September 2020
- Governor: Juhar Mahiruddin
- Chief Minister: Shafie Apdal
- Minister: Christina Liew Chin Jin
- Succeeded by: Joniston Bangkuai
- Constituency: Tungku

Member of the Sabah State Legislative Assembly for Tungku
- Incumbent
- Assumed office 9 May 2018
- Preceded by: Mohd Suhaili Said (BN–UMNO)
- Majority: 1,001 (2018); 268 (2020); 1,179 (2025)

Faction represented in the Sabah State Legislative Assembly
- 2018–: Heritage Party

Personal details
- Born: Assaffal @ Samsul Kamal bin P Alian; 27 November 1964 (age 61) Lahad Datu, Crown Colony of North Borneo (now Sabah, Malaysia)
- Party: Heritage Party (WARISAN)
- Occupation: Politician

Assaffal P. Alian (born Assaffal @ Samsul Kamal bin P. Alian; 27 November 1964) is a Malaysian politician who has served as Member of the Sabah State Legislative Assembly (MLA) for Tungku since May 2018. He served as the State Assistant Minister of Tourism, Culture and Environment of Sabah in the Heritage Party (WARISAN) state administration under former Chief Minister Shafie Apdal and Minister Christina Liew Chin Jin from May 2018 to the collapse of the WARISAN state administration in September 2020.

== Election results ==
Sabah State Legislative Assembly
Year	Constituency	Candidate	Votes	Pct	Opponent(s)	Votes	Pct	Ballots cast	Majority	Turnout
2018	N49 Tungku	Assaffal P. Alian (WARISAN)	6,295	49.89%	Mizma Appehdullah (Sabah UMNO)	5,294	41.95%	12,976	1,001	73.00%
2018	N49 Tungku	Assaffal P. Alian (WARISAN)	6,295	49.89%	Bulangan Panasi (PHRS)	928	7.35%	12,976	1,001	73.00%
2018	N49 Tungku	Assaffal P. Alian (WARISAN)	6,295	49.89%	Abd Rahman Taggoh (PKS)	102	0.81%	12,976	1,001	73.00%
2020	N60 Tungku	Assaffal P. Alian (WARISAN)	3,792	49.15%	Momen Anchai (Sabah UMNO)	3,254	45.49%	7,455	268	56.24%
2020	N60 Tungku	Assaffal P. Alian (WARISAN)	3,792	49.15%	Jumaat Anwar (IND)	154	2.07%	7,455	268	56.24%
2020	N60 Tungku	Assaffal P. Alian (WARISAN)	3,792	49.15%	Jani Kulmen (PCS)	142	1.91%	7,455	268	56.24%
2020	N60 Tungku	Assaffal P. Alian (WARISAN)	3,792	49.15%	Jainudin Berahim (LDP)	79	1.06%	7,455	268	56.24%
2020	N60 Tungku	Assaffal P. Alian (WARISAN)	3,792	49.15%	Amil Bangsa Amil Ahsan (PKS)	24	0.32%	7,455	268	56.24%
2025	N60 Tungku	Assaffal P. Alian (WARISAN)	5,739	37.56%	Abdul Hakim Gulam Hassan (GAGASAN)	4,560	29.84%	15,514	1,179	62.77%
2025	N60 Tungku	Assaffal P. Alian (WARISAN)	5,739	37.56%	Saleha Wahid (Sabah UMNO)	2,622	17.16%	15,514	1,179	62.77%
2025	N60 Tungku	Assaffal P. Alian (WARISAN)	5,739	37.56%	Suling Isib (STAR)	2,130	13.94%	15,514	1,179	62.77%
2025	N60 Tungku	Assaffal P. Alian (WARISAN)	5,739	37.56%	Hairunnizam Kamsin (IMPIAN)	112	0.73%	15,514	1,179	62.77%
2025	N60 Tungku	Assaffal P. Alian (WARISAN)	5,739	37.56%	Jani Kulmen (PKS)	73	0.48%	15,514	1,179	62.77%
2025	N60 Tungku	Assaffal P. Alian (WARISAN)	5,739	37.56%	Jakaria Nasiran (PPRS)	45	0.29%	15,514	1,179	62.77%

== Honours ==
- Sabah :
  - Companion of the Order of Kinabalu (ASDK) (2018)
  - Grand Star of the Order of Kinabalu (BSK) (2008)
