= Silam (state constituency) =

State constituency in Malaysia

Silam (N62)
Sabah constituency

State constituency
- Legislature: Sabah State Legislative Assembly
MLA
Yusof Apdal
Heritage
- Constituency created: 2019
- First contested: 2020
- Last contested: 2025

Demographics
- Electors (2025): 28,261

Silam is a state constituency in Sabah, Malaysia, that is represented in the Sabah State Legislative Assembly. Previously it was named Lahad Datu until a name change in 2019, when it was swapped with Silam.

== Demographics ==
As of 2020, Silam has a population of 45,375 people.

Ethnic breakdown of Silam's electorate as of 2025
1. Muslim Bumiputera (76.0%)
2. Chinese (14.0%)
3. Non-Muslim Bumiputera (10.0%)
4. Other ethnicities (0.00%)

== History ==
=== Polling districts ===
According to the gazette issued on 31 October 2022, the Silam constituency has a total of 7 polling districts.

State constituency	Polling District	Code	Location
Silam (N62)	Sepagaya	188/62/01	SK Teruasan
Silam (N62)	Sakar	188/62/02	SK Tanjong Paras
Silam (N62)	Bandar Lahad Datu	188/62/03	SK Lahad Datu III
Silam (N62)	Lapangan Terbang	188/62/04	SMK St. Dominic
Silam (N62)	Panji Baru	188/62/05	SK St. Dominic
Silam (N62)	Taman Fajar	188/62/06	SJK (C) Siew Ching
Silam (N62)	Silam	188/62/07	SK Silam

=== Representation history ===
Members of the Legislative Assembly for Silam
Assembly	No	Years	Member	Party
Constituency renamed from Lahad Datu
16th	N62	2020–2025	Dumi Pg. Masdal	WARISAN
17th	N62	2025–present	Yusof Apdal	WARISAN

== Election results ==
Sabah state election, 2025
Party	Candidate	Votes	%	∆%
Heritage	Yusof Apdal	7,116	43.38	▼10.40
GRS	Mizma Appehdullah	5,859	35.72	▲35.72
BN	Sharif Musa Sharif Mabul	1,835	11.19	▲11.19
PN	Borkes @ Balkis Kalinggalan	636	3.88	▼33.95
PH	Abd Halim Sidek Gulam Hassan (Note: Abd Halim withdrew himself from the election, but his name will remain on the ballot as he withdrew after Nomination Day.)	390	2.38	▲2.38
Sabah Dream Party	Brahim Bisel	275	1.68	▲1.68
Independent	Amat Kawoh @ Abd Rahman	172	1.05	▲1.05
Sabah Peace Party	Mohammad Enriquez	99	0.60	▲0.60
Sabah Nationality Party	Mohd Syafiq Iqhmal Saharudin	21	0.13	▲0.13
Total valid votes		16,403		
Total rejected ballots		252		
Unreturned ballots		19		
Turnout		16,674	59.00	▲3.42
Registered electors		28,261		
Majority		1,257	7.66	▼8.29
Heritage hold		Swing		
Source(s) "RESULTS OF CONTESTED ELECTION AND STATEMENTS OF THE POLL AFTER THE OFFICIAL ADDITION OF VOTES" (PDF).

Sabah state election, 2020
Party	Candidate	Votes	%
Sabah Heritage Party	Dumi Pg. Masdal	5,200	53.78
PN	Abdul Hakim Gulam Hassan	3,658	37.83
Love Sabah Party	Matusin Sunsuang	196	2.03
Sabah People's Unity Party	Erwan Johan	156	1.61
GAGASAN	Ahmad Tiong	122	1.26
USNO (Baru)	Mohammad Hamdan Abdullah	54	0.56
Total valid votes		9,386	97.07
Total rejected ballots		263	2.72
Unreturned ballots		20	0.21
Turnout		9,669	55.58
Registered electors		17,395	
Majority		1,542	15.95
This was a new constituency created.
