= Kunak =

Kunak Pekan Kunak
- Town and district capital
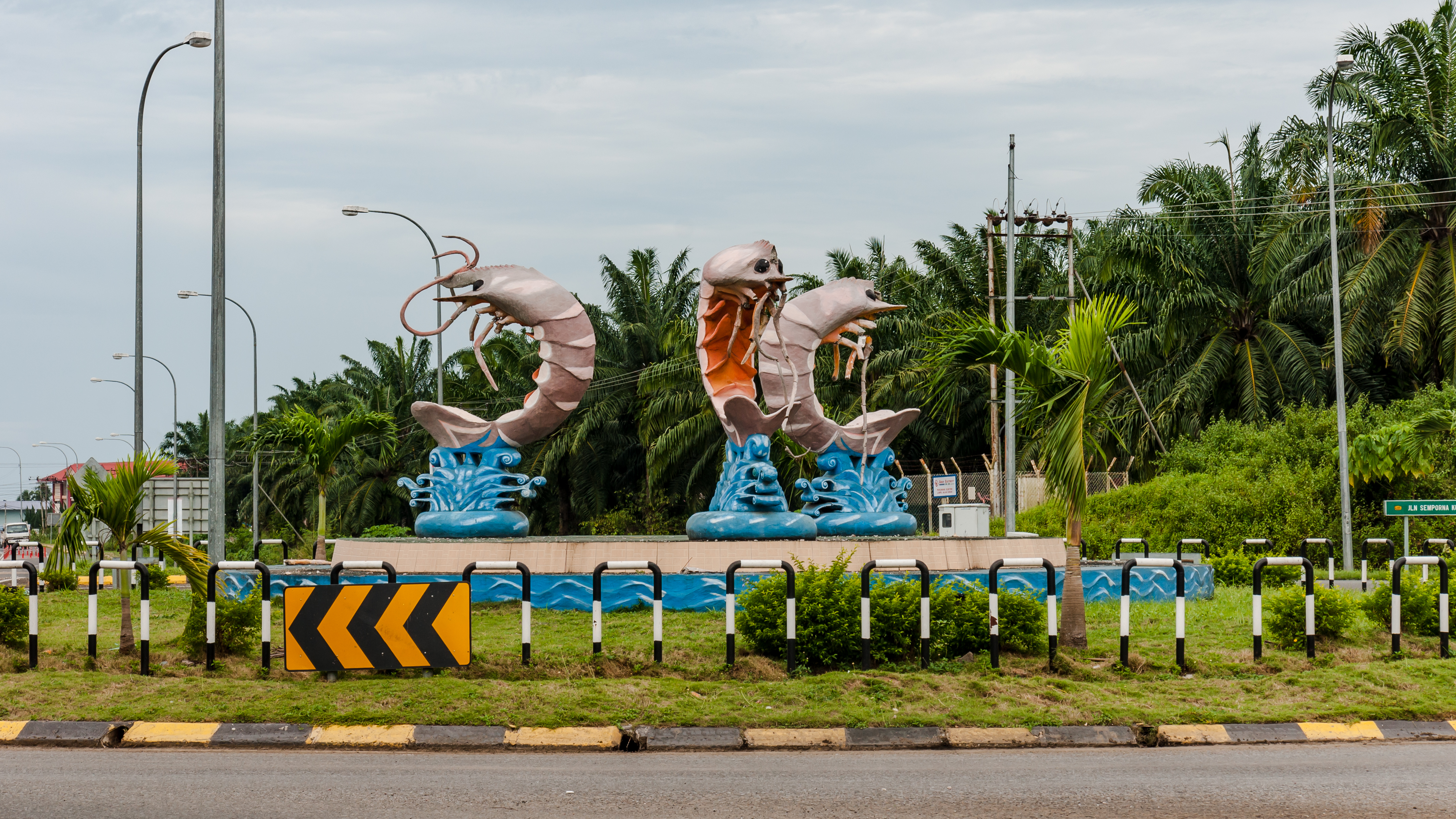
- A roundabout in Kunak.

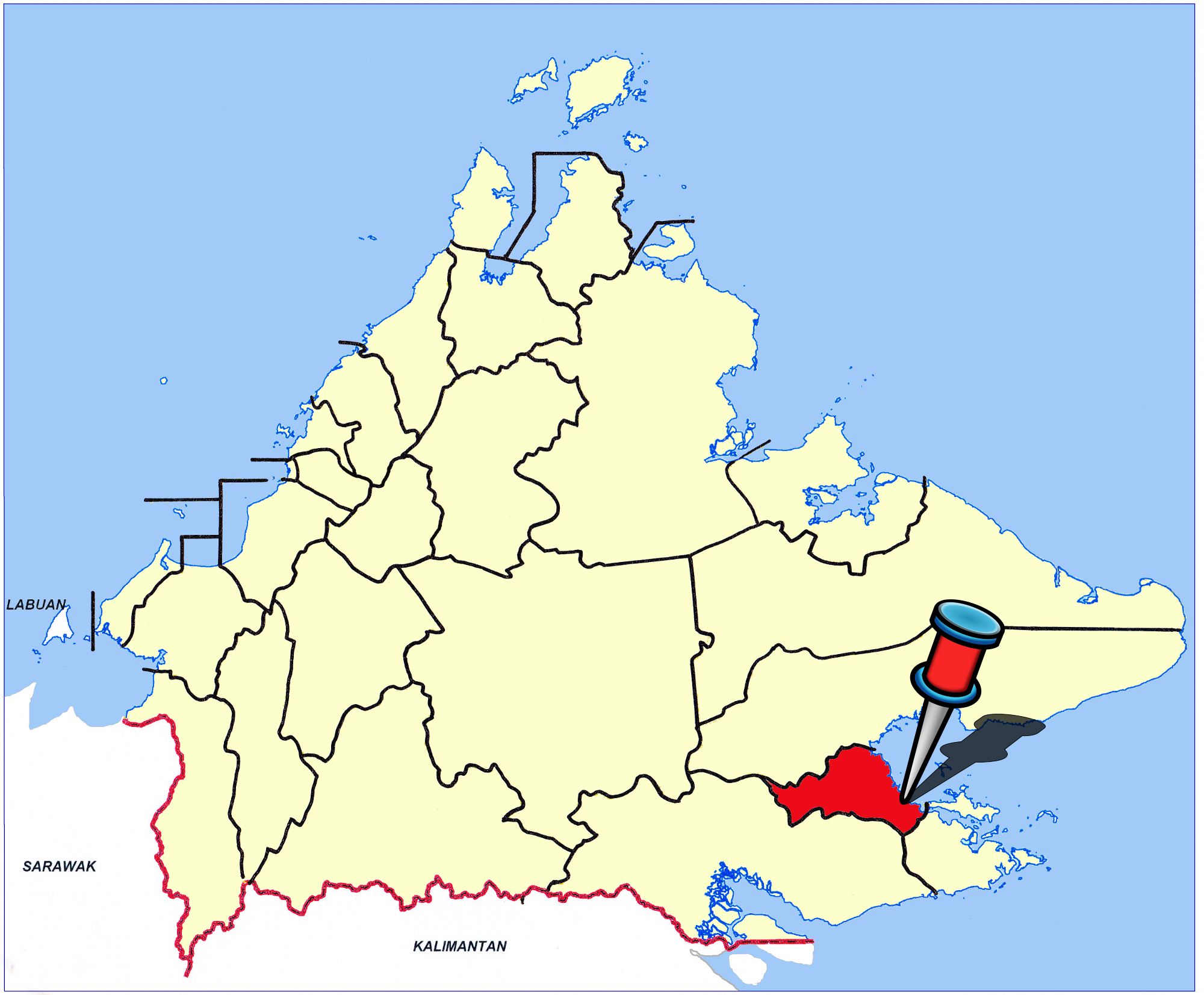
- Coordinates: 4°41′00″N 118°15′00″E
- Country: Malaysia
- State: Sabah
- Division: Tawau
- District: Kunak

Population (2010)
  - Total: 13,823

Kunak (Malay: Pekan Kunak) is the capital of the Kunak District in the Tawau Division of Sabah, Malaysia. Its population was estimated to be around 13,823 in 2010. The population consists mainly of Bajau and Suluk peoples. There is also a sizeable Chinese minority, involved in running many of the shops in downtown Kunak as well as the planting of oil palms in the outskirts.

== Education ==
Kunak has three main secondary schools: SMK Kunak Jaya, SMK Kunak and SMK Madai. It is also home to a Chinese primary school, SRJK(C) Pai Sheng, and several Malay-medium primary schools including SK Kunak 1, SK Kunak Jaya and SK Ladang Binuang. A resettlement scheme for Cocos Islanders is situated a few kilometres away, near the Giram Oil Palm Estate (run by Sime Darby Berhad). A jetty is situated about five km from the town, in an area named Pengkalan Kunak. A single road lined by wooden shophouses (possibly a squatter colony) leads to the jetty and wet market. In 2002, a 76-bed government hospital was built in the town. At around the same time, a new highway linking Kunak to the town of Semporna was also opened.

== Food ==
Kunak is renowned for its red chili cultivation, producing some of the region's most sought-after chili peppers.

== Gallery ==
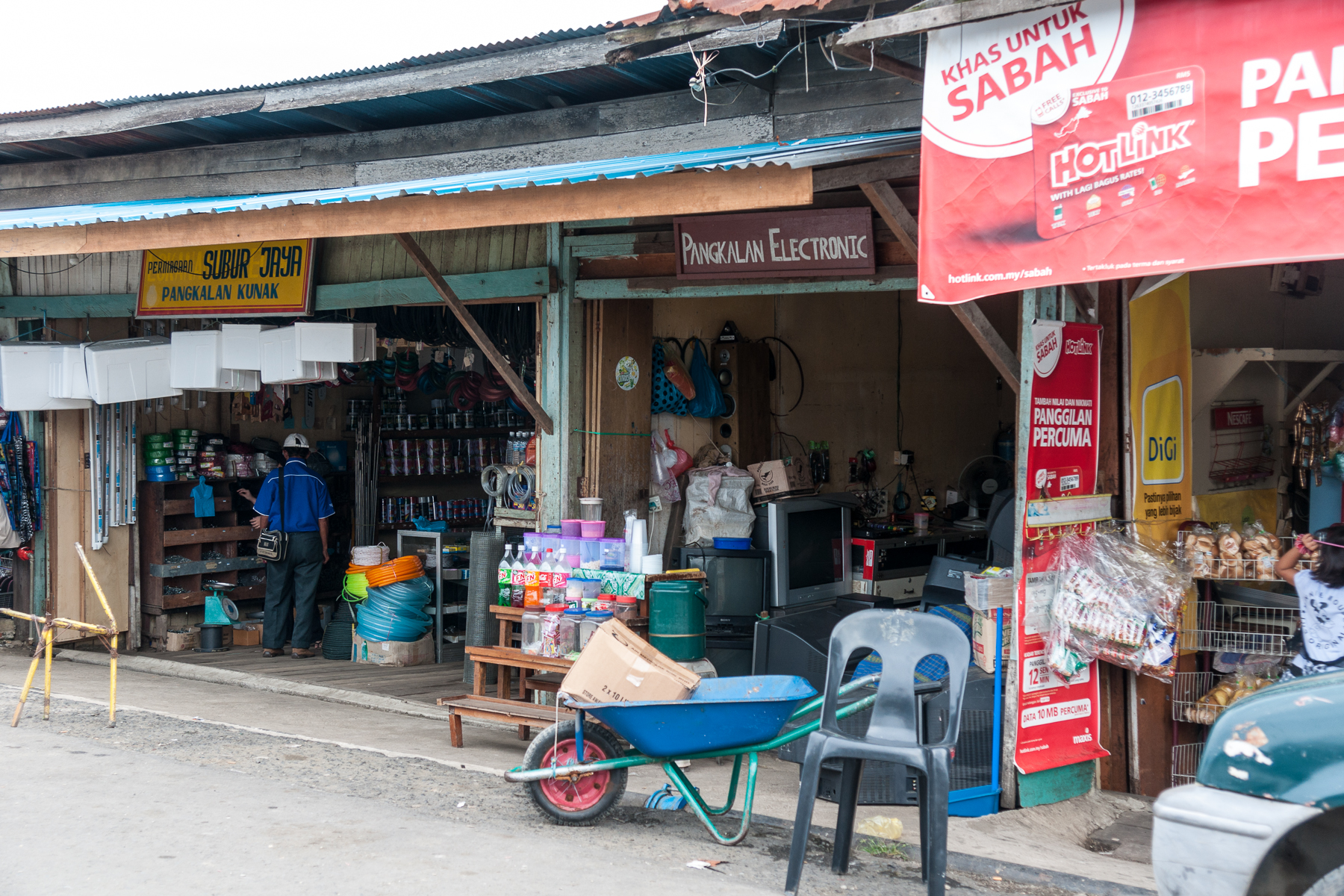
One of the old shoplots in Kunak.

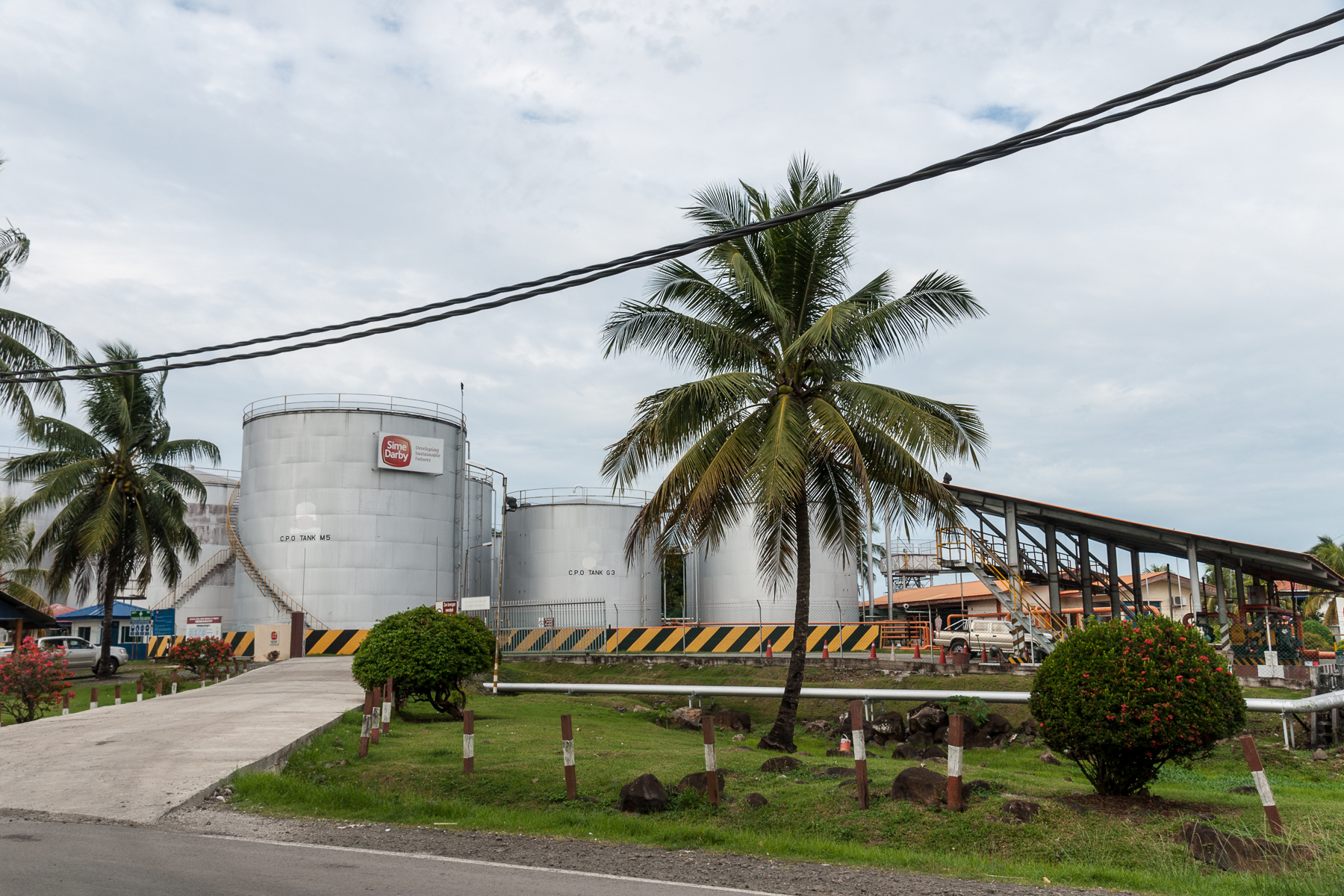
Sime Darby palm oil storage tanks in Kunak.

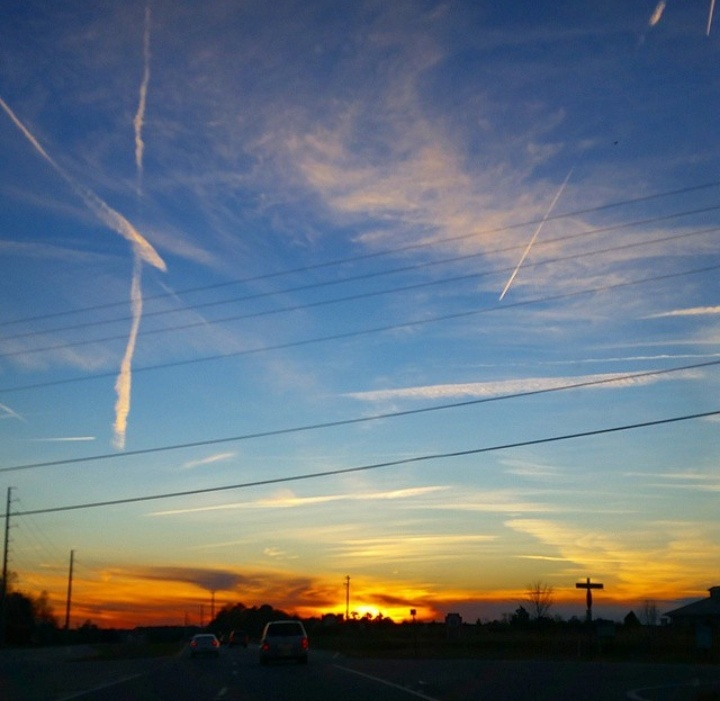
Sunset in Kunak
