= Kunak District =

Kunak District Daerah Kunak
- District
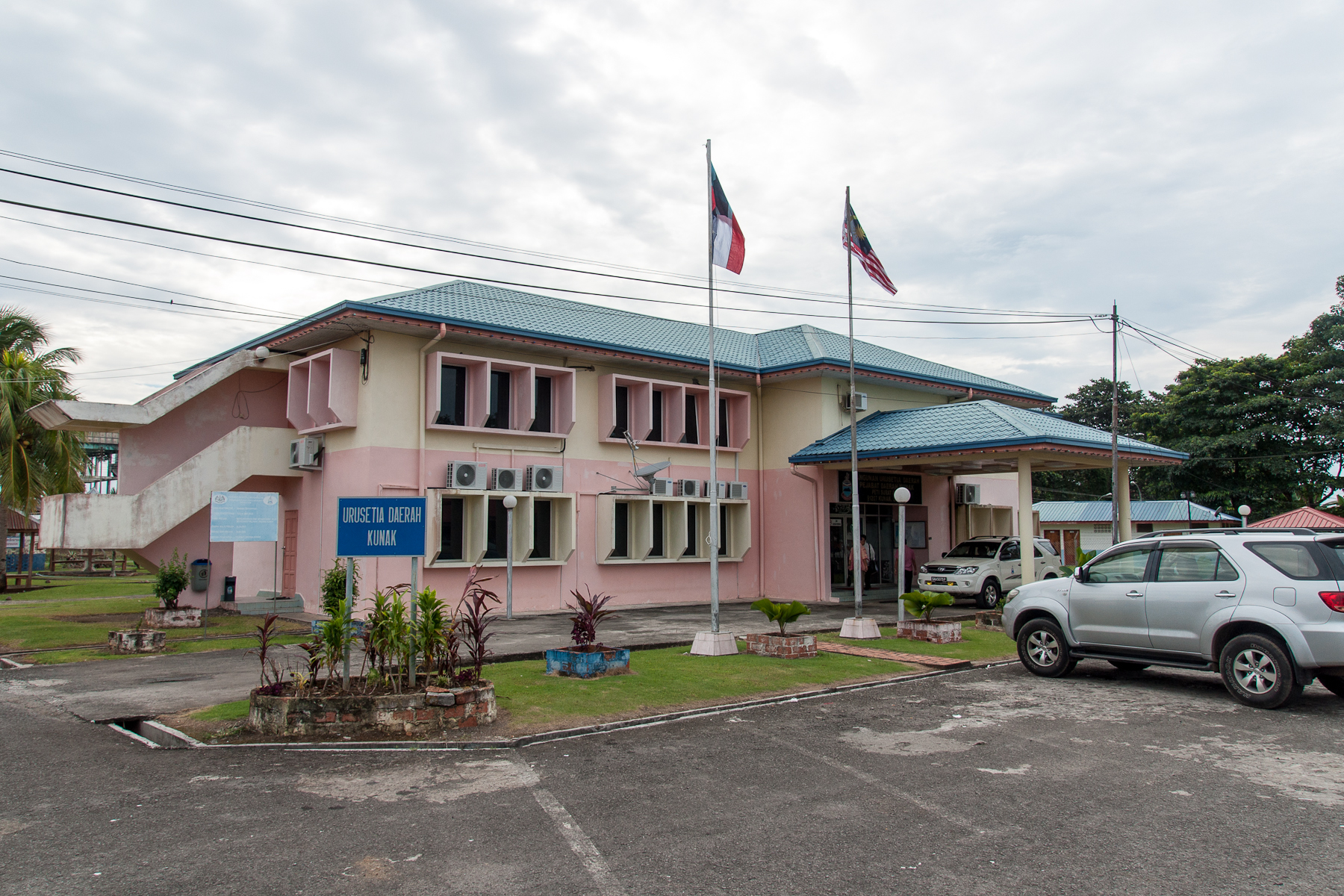
- Kunak District office.

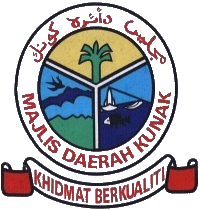
- Seal

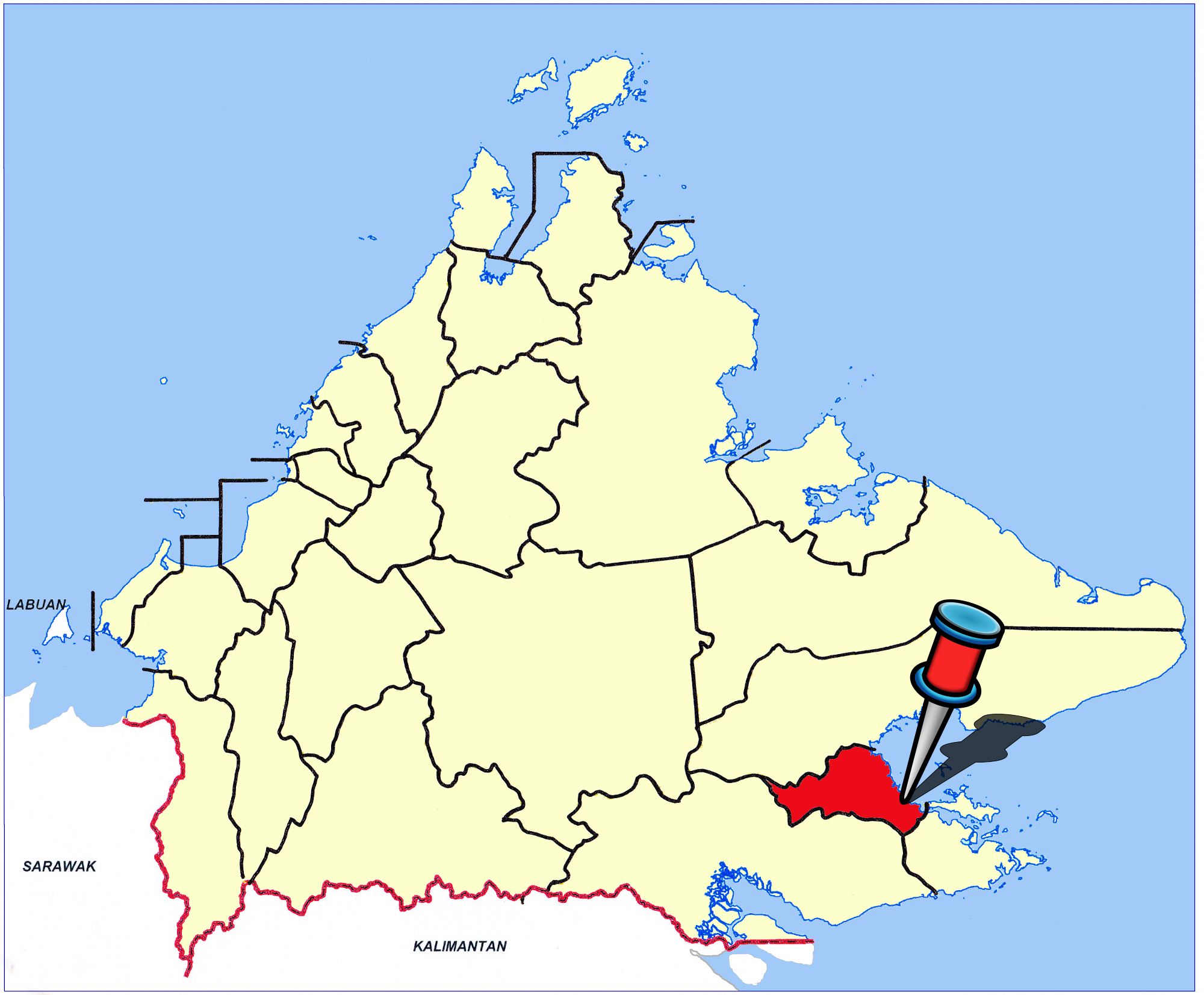
- Coordinates: 4°41′00″N 118°15′00″E
- Country: Malaysia
- State: Sabah
- Division: Tawau
- Capital: Kunak

Government
  - District Officer: Majaran Osman

Area
  - Total: 1,134 km^{2} (438 sq mi)

Population (2010)
  - Total: 61,094
- Website: mdkunak.sbh.gov.my sbh.gov.my/pd.knk

Map of Kunak District

The Kunak District (Malay: Daerah Kunak) is an administrative district in the Malaysian state of Sabah, part of the Tawau Division which includes the districts of Kunak, Lahad Datu, Semporna and Tawau. The capital of the district is in Kunak Town. Prior to its elevation, Kunak district was once a sub-district of Lahad Datu before 1990.

== Demographics ==
According to the last census in 2010, the population of Kunak district is estimated to be around 61,094 inhabitants. As in other districts of Sabah, there are a significant number of illegal immigrants from the nearby southern Philippines, mainly from the Sulu Archipelago and Mindanao, many of whom are not included in the population statistics.

== Gallery ==
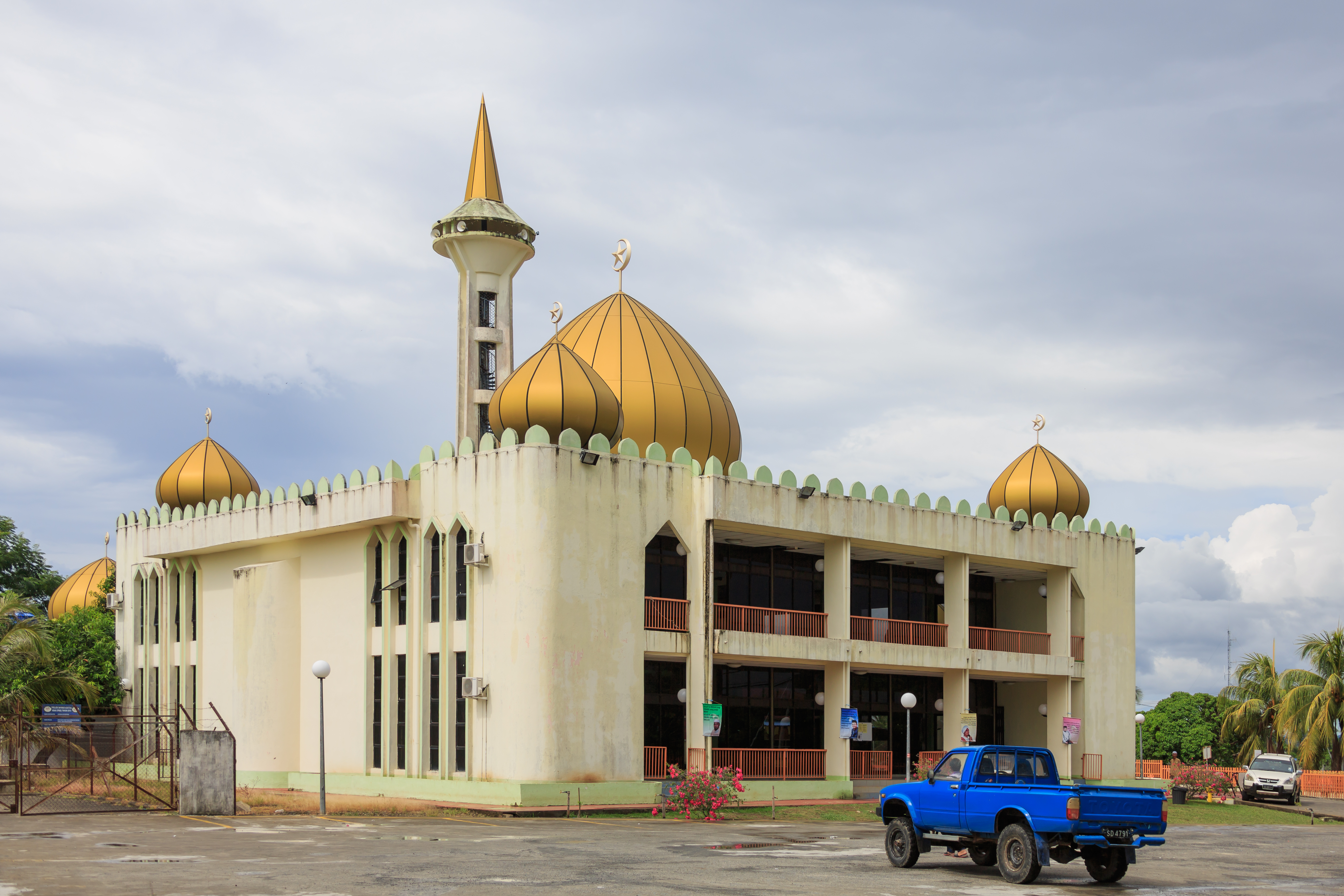
Datuk Zainal Gunong Mosque.

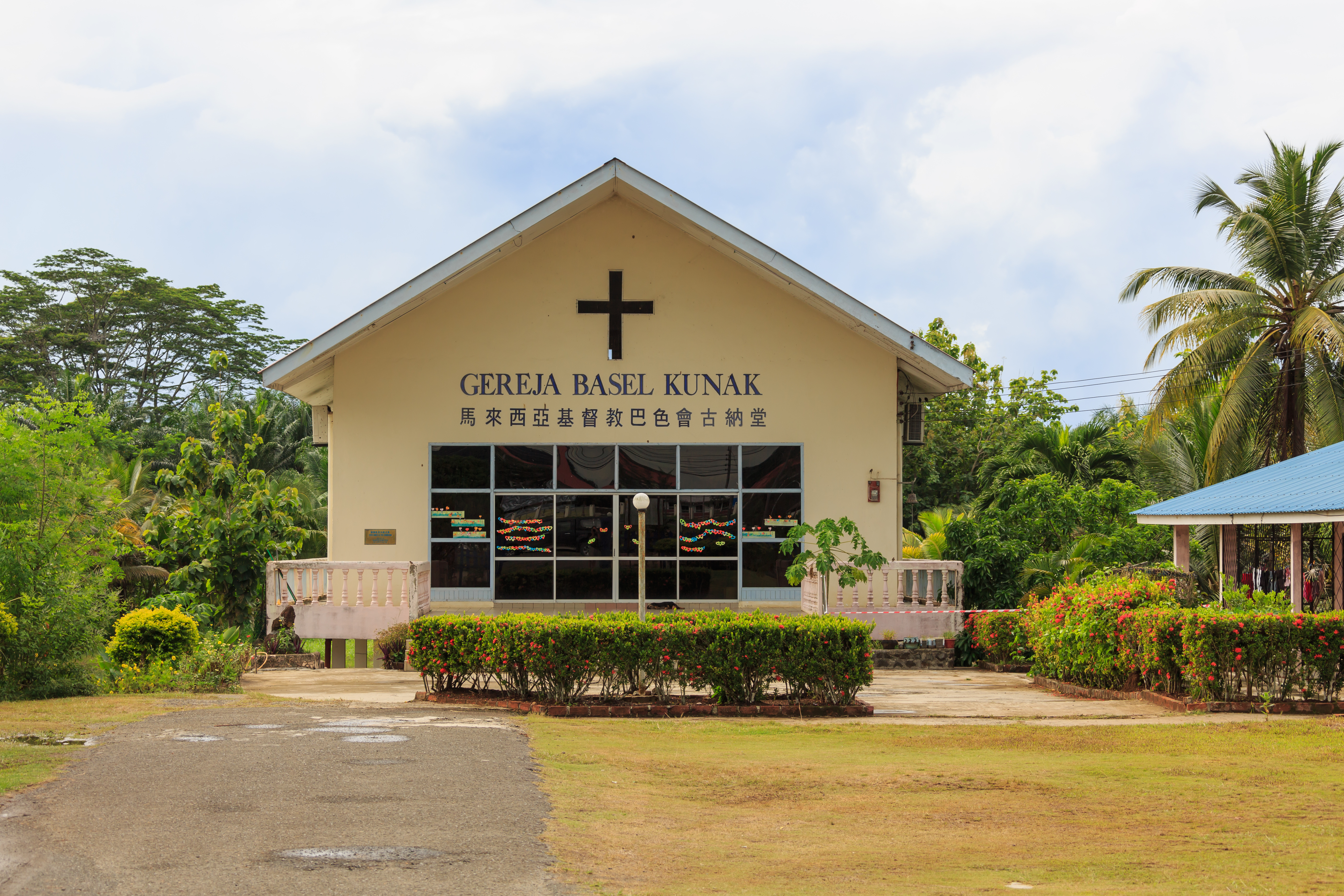
Kunak Basel Church.

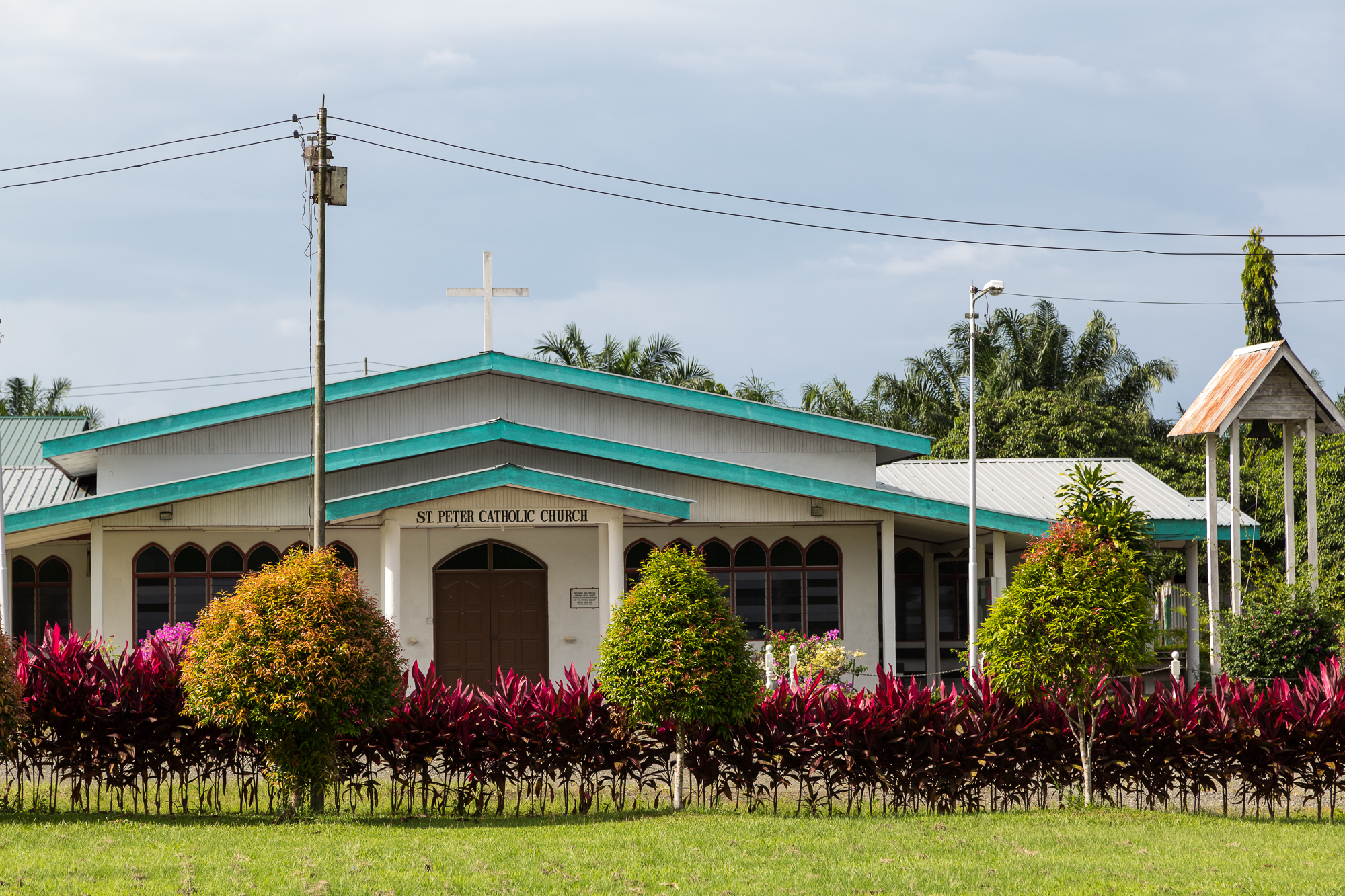
St. Peter Catholic Church.

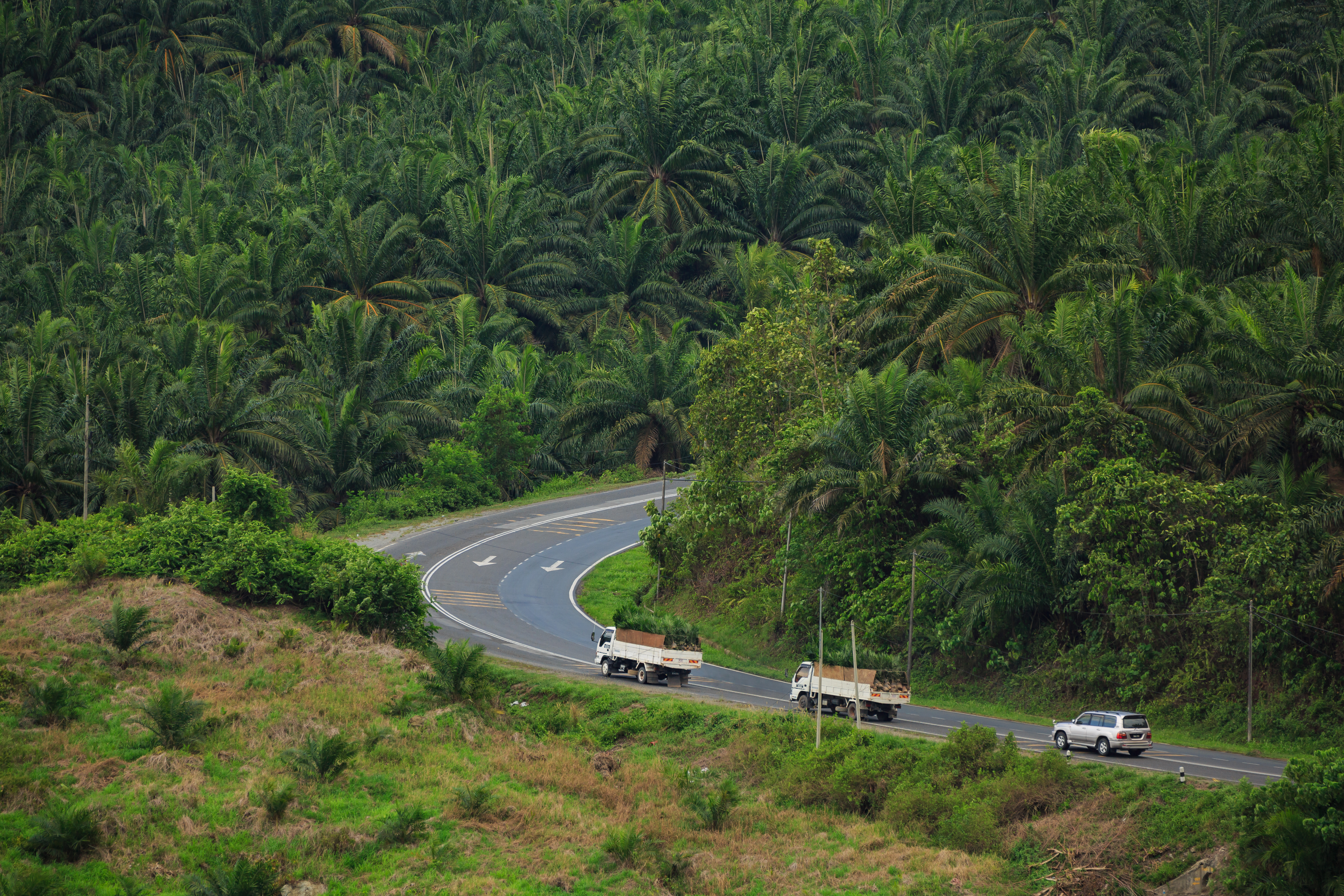
Kunak District road.

== See also ==
- Districts of Malaysia
