= Tungku (state constituency) =

State constituency in Sabah, Malaysia

Tungku (N60)
Sabah constituency

State constituency
- Legislature: Sabah State Legislative Assembly
MLA
Assaffal P. Alian
Heritage
- Constituency created: 2003
- First contested: 2004
- Last contested: 2025

Demographics
- Population (2020): 79,995
- Electors (2025): 24,741

Tungku is a state constituency in Sabah, Malaysia, that is represented in the Sabah State Legislative Assembly.

== Demographics ==
As of 2020, Tungku has a population of 79,995 people.

Ethnic breakdown of Tungku's electorate as of 2025
1. Muslim Bumiputera (88.0%)
2. Non-Muslim Bumiputera (11.0%)
3. Chinese (1.00%)
4. Other ethnicities (0.00%)

== History ==
=== Polling districts ===
According to the gazette issued on 31 October 2022, the Tungku constituency has a total of 7 polling districts.

State constituency	Polling District	Code	Location
Tungku (N60)	Segangan	188/60/01	SK Bikang
Tungku (N60)	Silabukan	188/60/02	SMK Silabukan
Tungku (N60)	Ulu Tungku	188/60/03	SK Sri Darun
Tungku (N60)	Tungku	188/60/04	SMK Tungku; SK Bangingod
Tungku (N60)	FELDA Sahabat	188/60/05	SK Sahabat 16; SK Cenderawasih; SK Sahabat II
Tungku (N60)	Tambisan	188/60/06	Mini Dewan Tambisan Darat
Tungku (N60)	Tanjung Labian	188/60/07	SK Tanjung Labian

=== Representation History ===
Member of Sabah State Legislative Assembly for Tungku
Assembly	No	Years	Member	Party
Constituency created from Lahad Datu and Sukau
12th	N49	2004–2008	Mohd Suhaili Said	BN (UMNO)
13th	N49	2008–2013	Mohd Suhaili Said	BN (UMNO)
14th	N49	2013–2017	Mohd Suhaili Said	BN (UMNO)
14th	N49	2017–2018	Vacant (Note: Vacant from 24 March 2017 until the 2018 Malaysian general election due to the incumbent died in office. No by-election was held due to the next general election was less than a year and a half away..)	
15th	N49	2018–2020	Assaffal P. Alian	WARISAN
16th	N60	2020–2025	Assaffal P. Alian	WARISAN
17th	N60	2025–present	Assaffal P. Alian	WARISAN

== Election results ==
Sabah state election, 2025
Party	Candidate	Votes	%	∆%
Heritage	Assaffal P. Alian	5,739	37.56	▼10.44
GRS	Abdul Hakim Gulam Hassan	4,560	29.84	▲29.84
BN	Saleha Wahid	2,622	17.16	▼27.45
Homeland Solidarity Party	Suling Isib	2,130	13.94	▲13.94
Sabah Dream Party	Hairunnizam Kamsin	112	0.73	▲0.73
Sabah Nationality Party	Jani Kulmen	73	0.48	▲0.48
Sabah People's Unity Party	Jakaria Nasiran	45	0.29	▲0.29
Total valid votes		15,281		
Total rejected ballots		233		
Unreturned ballots		16		
Turnout		15,530	62.77	▲3.17
Registered electors		24,741		
Majority		1,179	7.72	▲4.33
Sabah Heritage Party hold		Swing		
Source(s) "RESULTS OF CONTESTED ELECTION AND STATEMENTS OF THE POLL AFTER THE OFFICIAL ADDITION OF VOTES" (PDF).

Sabah state election, 2020
Party	Candidate	Votes	%	∆%
Sabah Heritage Party	Assaffal P. Alian	3,792	48.00	▼0.51
BN	Abdul Momen Anchai @ Momen Anghai	3,524	44.61	▲3.81
Independent	Jumaat Anwar	154	1.95	▲1.95
Love Sabah Party	Jani Kulmen	142	1.80	▲1.80
USNO (Baru)	Mohammad Sidam	79	1.00	▲1.00
Sabah Nationality Party	Amil Bangsa Amil Ahsan	24	0.30	▼0.49
Total valid votes		7,715	97.66	
Total rejected ballots		133	1.68	
Unreturned ballots		52	0.66	
Turnout		7,900	59.60	▼13.41
Registered electors		13,255		
Majority		268	3.39	▼4.32
Sabah Heritage Party hold		Swing		
Source(s) "RESULTS OF CONTESTED ELECTION AND STATEMENTS OF THE POLL AFTER THE OFFICIAL ADDITION OF VOTES".

Sabah state election, 2018
Party	Candidate	Votes	%	∆%
Sabah Heritage Party	Assaffal P. Alian	6,295	48.51	▲48.51
BN	Mizma Appehdullah	5,294	40.80	▼28.58
Sabah People's Hope Party	Bulangan Panasi	928	7.15	▲7.15
Sabah Nationality Party	Abdul Rahman Taggoh	102	0.79	▲0.79
Total valid votes		12,619	97.25	
Total rejected ballots		352	2.71	
Unreturned ballots		5	0.04	
Turnout		12,976	73.01	▼4.33
Registered electors		17,773		
Majority		1,001	7.71	▼40.77
Sabah Heritage Party gain from BN		Swing		?
Source(s) "RESULTS OF CONTESTED ELECTION AND STATEMENTS OF THE POLL AFTER THE OFFICIAL ADDITION OF VOTES".

Sabah state election, 2013
Party	Candidate	Votes	%	∆%
BN	Mohd Suhaili Said	7,848	69.38	▲6.78
PKR	Johani Abdul Halim	2,364	20.90	▼10.81
SAPP	Shuaib Mutalib	373	3.30	▲3.30
STAR	Johan Nul	337	2.98	▲2.98
Independent	Tsen Yun Fah @ Mohd Azlan Tsen Abdullah	96	0.85	▲0.85
Total valid votes		11,018	97.40	
Total rejected ballots		287	2.54	
Unreturned ballots		7	0.06	
Turnout		11,312	77.34	▲14.36
Registered electors		14,626		
Majority		5,484	48.48	▲17.59
BN hold		Swing		
Source(s) "KEPUTUSAN PILIHAN RAYA UMUM DEWAN UNDANGAN NEGERI".

Sabah state election, 2008
Party	Candidate	Votes	%	∆%
BN	Mohd Suhaili Said	4,828	62.60	▼14.45
PKR	Jamal Sulai	2,446	31.71	▲31.71
Independent	Abdul Raja Abdul Mohamad	164	2.13	▲2.13
Total valid votes		7,438	96.43	
Total rejected ballots		271	3.51	
Unreturned ballots		4	0.05	
Turnout		7,713	62.98	▲2.36
Registered electors		12,246		
Majority		2,382	30.89	▼30.37
BN hold		Swing		
Source(s) "KEPUTUSAN PILIHAN RAYA UMUM DEWAN UNDANGAN NEGERI SABAH BAGI TAHUN 2008".

Sabah state election, 2004
Party	Candidate	Votes	%
BN	Mohd Suhaili Said	5,290	77.05
Independent	Hassan Malempeng	1,084	15.79
SETIA	Norsiah Abdul Hamid	249	3.63
Total valid votes		6,623	96.46
Total rejected ballots		212	3.08
Unreturned ballots		31	0.45
Turnout		6,866	60.62
Registered electors		11,327	
Majority		4,206	61.26
This was a new constituency created.
Source(s) "KEPUTUSAN PILIHAN RAYA UMUM DEWAN UNDANGAN NEGERI SABAH BAGI TAHUN 2004".
