= Lahad Datu (state constituency) =

Sabah constituency

Defunct state constituency
- Legislature: Sabah State Legislative Assembly
- Constituency created: 1967
- Constituency abolished: 2020
- First contested: 1967
- Last contested: 2018

Lahad Datu was a state constituency in Sabah, Malaysia, that is represented in the Sabah State Legislative Assembly.

== History ==
=== Representation history ===
Member of Sabah State Legislative Assembly for Lahad Datu
Assembly	No	Years	Member	Party
Constituency created
3rd	N29	1967 – 1971	Salleh Sulong	Alliance (USNO)
4th	N29	1971 – 1976	Johari Ariff	Alliance (USNO)
5th	N40	1976 – 1981	Mohd Sunoh Marso	BERJAYA
6th	N40	1981 – 1985	Mohd Sunoh Marso	BN (BERJAYA)
7th	N45	1985 – 1986	Mohd Sunoh Marso	BN (BERJAYA)
8th	N45	1986 – 1990	Mohamaddin Ketapi	PBS
9th	N45	1990 – 1994	Askalani Abdul Rahim	BN (USNO)
10th	N45	1994 – 1999	Mohamad Yusof Amat Jamlee	BN (UMNO)
11th	N42	1999 – 2004	Samsu Baharun Abdul Rahman	BN (UMNO)
12th	N50	2004 – 2008	Nasrun Mansur	BN (UMNO)
13th	N50	2008 – 2013	Nasrun Mansur	BN (UMNO)
14th	N50	2013 – 2018	Mohammad Yusof Apdal	BN (UMNO)
15th	N50	2018–2020	Dumi Pg Masdal	WARISAN
Constituency split into Silam and Segama

== Election Result ==
Sabah state election, 2018
Party	Candidate	Votes	%	∆%
Sabah Heritage Party	Dumi Pg. Masdal	11,304	55.58	▲55.58
BN	Mohammad Yusof Apdal	8,372	41.16	▼27.95
Parti Harapan Rakyat Sabah	Wong Yu Chin	663	3.26	▲3.26
Total valid votes		20,339	100.00	
Total rejected ballots		432		
Unreturned ballots		63		
Turnout		20,834	72.70	▼3.47
Registered electors		28,658		
Majority		2,932	14.42	▼30.50
Sabah Heritage Party gain from BN		Swing		-

Sabah state election, 2013
Party	Candidate	Votes	%	∆%
BN	Mohammad Yusof Apdal	12,949	69.11	▲7.36
PKR	Abdul Hamid Awong	4,534	24.20	▼14.05
SAPP	Aliandu Enjil	912	4.87	▲4.87
Homeland Solidarity Party	Ariffin Hamid	341	1.82	▲1.82
Total valid votes		18,736	100.00	
Total rejected ballots		451		
Unreturned ballots		32		
Turnout		19,219	76.17	▲13.25
Registered electors		25,232		
Majority		8,415	44.91	▲21.41
BN hold		Swing		

Sabah state election, 2008
Party	Candidate	Votes	%	∆%
BN	Nasrun Mansur	8,034	61.75	▼1.95
PKR	Zainuddin Zulkarnain	4,976	38.25	▲29.77
Total valid votes		13,010	100.00	
Total rejected ballots		428		
Unreturned ballots		119		
Turnout		13,557	62.92	▲5.05
Registered electors		21,548		
Majority		3,058	23.50	▼24.45
BN hold		Swing		{{{2}}}

Sabah state election, 2004
Party	Candidate	Votes	%	∆%
BN	Nasrun Mansur	6,737	63.70	▲20.09
Independent	Johani Abd Halim	1,665	15.74	▲15.74
PKR	Sharlie Jani	897	8.48	▲8.48
Independent	Abdul Rajak Aliuddin	690	6.52	▲6.52
Independent	Patawi Wadijo	306	2.89	▲2.89
Independent	Tamsun Hamimun	281	2.66	▲2.66
Total valid votes		10,576	100.00	
Total rejected ballots		542		
Unreturned ballots		130		
Turnout		11,248	57.87	▼6.62
Registered electors		19,437		
Majority		5,072	47.96	▲41.04
BN hold		Swing		{{{2}}}

Sabah state election, 1999
Party	Candidate	Votes	%	∆%
BN	Samsu Baharun Abdul Rahman	7,781	43.62	▼7.92
PBS	Sulaiman Pengiran Atok	6,547	36.70	▼7.30
BERSEKUTU	Abdillah Abdul Hamid	2,933	16.44	▲14.50
SETIA	Abdul Banning Abdul Mohamed	579	3.25	▲3.25
Total valid votes		17,840	100.00	
Total rejected ballots		218		
Unreturned ballots		69		
Turnout		18,127	64.49	▼2.25
Registered electors		28,110		
Majority		1,234	6.92	▼0.62
BN hold		Swing		{{{2}}}

Sabah state election, 1994
Party	Candidate	Votes	%	∆%
BN	Mohamad Yusof Amat Jamlee	7,820	51.54	▲51.54
PBS	Askalani Abdul Rahim	6,676	44.00	▲2.59
Independent	Ismail O.T. Ator	382	2.52	▼4.68
BERSEKUTU	Benjamin Usman	295	1.94	▲1.94
Total valid votes		15,173	100.00	
Total rejected ballots		212		
Unreturned ballots		0		
Turnout		15,385	66.73	▼3.04
Registered electors		23,055		
Majority		1,144	7.54	▲5.18
BN hold		Swing		{{{2}}}

Sabah state election, 1990
Party	Candidate	Votes	%	∆%
BN	Askalani Abdul Rahim	5,054	43.77	▲43.77
PBS	Mohamaddin Ketapi	4,781	41.40	▼7.39
Independent	Tutik Garuda	831	7.20	▲7.01
BERJAYA	Chin Yun Fook	694	6.01	▼34.29
LDP	Pang Yee Yun	187	1.62	▲1.62
Total valid votes		11,547	100.00	
Total rejected ballots		161		
Unreturned ballots		13		
Turnout		11,721	69.77	▼1.70
Registered electors		16,799		
Majority		273	2.36	▼6.13
BN gain from PBS		Swing		-

Sabah state election, 1986
Party	Candidate	Votes	%	∆%
PBS	Mohamaddin Ketapi	4,556	48.80	▲22.19
BERJAYA	Gamut Ismail	3,763	40.30	▲1.27
Independent	Nasrun Mansur	867	9.29	▲8.85
Independent	Kasuari Ariff	85	0.91	▲0.47
Independent	Mohd. Kamal Kamaruddin	49	0.52	▲0.09
Independent	Muhammad Mansur	17	0.18	▼0.26
Total valid votes		9,337	100.00	
Total rejected ballots		92		
Unreturned ballots		0		
Turnout		9,429	71.48	▼0.92
Registered electors		13,192		
Majority		793	8.49	▼3.40
PBS gain from BERJAYA		Swing		-

Sabah state election, 1985
Party	Candidate	Votes	%	∆%
BERJAYA	Mohd. Sunoh Marso	3,207	39.03	▼23.21
USNO	Railey Jeffrey	2,230	27.14	▼8.67
PBS	Mohamaddin Ketapi	2,186	26.60	▲26.60
BERSIH	Pandikar Amin Mulia	466	5.67	▲5.67
BERSEPADU	Abdul Banning Abdul Mohamed	92	1.12	▲1.12
Independent	Mohd. Kamal Kamaruddin	36	0.44	▲0.44
Total valid votes		8,217	100.00	
Total rejected ballots		148		
Unreturned ballots		0		
Turnout		8,365	72.39	▼1.56
Registered electors		11,555		
Majority		977	11.89	▼14.54
BERJAYA hold		Swing		{{{2}}}

Sabah state election, 1981
Party	Candidate	Votes	%	∆%
BERJAYA	Mohd. Sunoh Marso	3,991	62.24	▲5.92
USNO	Railey Jeffrey	2,296	35.81	▼6.90
DAP	Mok Shou Khyun	125	1.95	▲1.95
Total valid votes		6,412	100.00	
Total rejected ballots		93		
Unreturned ballots		0		
Turnout		6,505	73.95	▼3.17
Registered electors		8,796		
Majority		1,695	26.43	▲12.83
BERJAYA gain		Swing		{{{3}}}

Sabah state election, 1976
Party	Candidate	Votes	%	∆%
BERJAYA	Mohd. Sunoh Marso	2,442	56.32	
USNO	Johari Ariff	1,852	42.71	
PEKEMAS	Ab. Wahid Khad	22	0.51	
Independent	Mohammad Yussof Tan	20	0.46	
Total valid votes		4,336	100.00	
Total rejected ballots		205		
Unreturned ballots		0		
Turnout		4,541	77.12	▲77.12
Registered electors		5,888		
Majority		590	13.61	▲13.61
BERJAYA gain from USNO		Swing		-

Sabah state election, 1971
Party	Candidate	Votes	%	∆%
On Nomination Day, Johari Ariff won uncontested.
USNO	Johari Ariff			
Total valid votes				
Total rejected ballots				
Unreturned ballots				
Turnout				
Registered electors		0		
Majority				
USNO hold		Swing		

Sabah state election, 1967
Party	Candidate	Votes	%
USNO	Salleh Sulong	2,188	56.07
Independent	Tan Chong Ming	1,714	43.93
Total valid votes		3,902	100.00
Total rejected ballots		110	
Unreturned ballots		0	
Turnout		4,012	84.29
Registered electors		4,760	
Majority		474	12.15
This was a new seat created
