= Heritage Party (Malaysia) =

Heritage Party Parti Warisan
- Abbreviation: WARISAN
- President: Shafie Apdal
- Deputy President: Ignatius Darell Leiking
- Secretary General: Loretto Damien S. Padua, Jr.
- Founders: Shafie Apdal
- Founded: 17 October 2016; 10 years ago (as Parti Warisan Sabah); 12 December 2020; 5 years ago (as Parti Warisan)
- Split from: UMNO (Shafie Apdal); PKR (Darell Leiking); DAP (Junz Wong)
- Preceded by: Sabah Heritage Development Party
- Headquarters: No 8, Aras 1, Lorong Kompleks BSA, Kolombong, Kota Kinabalu, Sabah
- Membership (2022): 450,000
- Ideology: Progressivism; Multiracialism; Nationalism
- Political position: Centre
- National affiliation: Warisan Plus (2016–2021) (Note: From 2018 to 2020, Warisan was PH's junior partner in federal coalition government, while Warisan was the senior partner in Sabah coalition government); National Unity Government (since 2022)
- Colours: Light blue, dark blue and red
- Slogan: Bangsa Kita, Warisan Kita, Masa Depan Kita ('Our Nation, Our Heritage, Our Future')
- Anthem: Warisan Pertahan Warisan Negara
- Dewan Negara: 0 / 70
- Dewan Rakyat: 3 / 222
- Dewan Undangan Negeri: 25 / 612

Election symbol

Party flag

Website
- partiwarisan.my

The Heritage Party (Malay: Parti Warisan, WARISAN) is a multiracial political party in Malaysia which was rebranded and renamed from the Sabah Heritage Party (Malay: Parti Warisan Sabah), a Sabah-based party led by Shafie Apdal formed earlier on 17 October 2016 after its expansion into national level politics at the end of 2020.

== History ==
Warisan formed an electoral alliance with Pakatan Harapan (PH) in the 2018 general election (GE14). Party president Shafie Apdal promised that the party would be represented in the federal cabinet should PH be elected to power, adding that through the electoral pact, the party would only cooperate with instead of joining the coalition. The party soon became part of the ruling government following Pakatan Harapan's victory in the general election. However, Warisan returned to the opposition in April 2021 following the fall of the PH government.

During the 2020 Sabah state election, the state ruling party was defeated by the informal Gabungan Rakyat Sabah (GRS) state opposition coalition consisting of the federal ruling Perikatan Nasional, Barisan Nasional, and the United Sabah Party. Warisan failed to secure a simple majority to retain the state power, allowing the GRS coalition to form a new state government. Following the 2020 election, Warisan became the largest opposition party within the Sabah Legislative Assembly, and the outgoing Chief Minister, party president Shafie Apdal, became the new Leader of the Opposition in Sabah.

At the party's annual general meeting on 12 December 2020, members voted in favour of elevating the party from a state-based party into a national party, aiming to represent East Malaysia within the national decision-making. Following this announcement, the party was renamed into the Heritage Party (Parti Warisan).

Warisan officially began its expansion into Peninsula Malaysia on 17 December 2021 with the launch of its peninsular chapter, which would be collaborating with MUDA. At the same event, Shafie also hinted that a Peninsular Malaysian assemblyman would be joining the party. On 22 January 2022, Bryan Lai Wai Chong, the Selangor assemblyman for Teratai joined the party to become its first peninsular assemblyman, followed two days later by Law Heng Kiang, a former Penang assemblyman for Batu Lancang, and former Jelutong MP Jeff Ooi. In February 2022, UMNO's former Kukup assemblyman, Suhaimi Salleh, joined the party to become its Johor elections coordinator in the 12 March state election.

On 15 February 2022, Warisan announced that they would contest in the 2022 Johor state election as a test of the party's support in the Peninsula. Besides Suhaimi Salleh, Warisan also recruited former Malaysian Indian Congress (MIC) Central Working Committee (CWC) member Datuk Seri S. Sunther, son of ex-MIC Vice President Datuk Seri S. Subramaniam, as well as former GERAKAN Johor Women's Chief Wong Siew Poh to assist the party in the election. Eventually, candidates from Warisan contested in 6 of the 56 state assembly seats on offer, but failed to win any of the seats.

In the 2025 Sabah state election, Warisan won 25 seats, coming close behind GRS both in seat count and vote share. Part of its support came from ethnic Chinese voters shifting from the Democratic Action Party (DAP), with Warisan winning all six seats previously held by the DAP.

== Organisational structure ==
- President :
  - Shafie Apdal
- Deputy President :
  - Ignatius Dorell Leiking
- Vice-President :
  - Isnaraissah Munirah Majilis
  - Junz Wong Hong Jun
  - Azis Jamman
- Secretary-General :
- Secretary-Executive :
- Information Chief :
- Treasurer-General :
- Wanita Chief :
  - Jennifer Lasimbang
- Wira Chief :
  - Khairuddin Daud
- Wirawati Chief :
  - Norsabrina Japar
- Supreme Council Members :
  - Harun Ismail
  - Arunarnsin Taib
  - Mudi Dubing
  - Loi Kok Liang
  - Alex Thien Ching Qiang
  - Majamis Timbong
  - Adeli Abat
  - Vivian Thien Shin Ying
  - Rahman Jali
  - Mohammad Firdaus Diun
  - Azahari Rangon
  - David William
  - Ag Besar Abdul Rashid
  - Ahmad Hassan
  - Liaw Kit Siong
  - Juriah Uda
  - Alex Wong Tshun Khee
  - Zainal Abidin Sahidal
  - George Jonik
  - Koh Piaw Peng @ Koh Kian Ling
- National Coordinator :
  - Dr Rajiv Bhanot
- State Coordinator :
  - Perlis : Abdul A'zib Saad
  - Kedah : Fadzil Hanafi
  - Kelantan : Khairul Azuan Kamaruddin
  - Penang : Jeff Ooi
  - Perak : Sunther Subramaniam
  - Selangor : Lai Wai Chong
  - Negeri Sembilan : Azman Idris
  - Malacca : Ng Choon Koon
  - Johor : Suhaimi Salleh
  - Labuan : Rozman Isli

== Elected representatives ==
=== Dewan Negara (Senate) ===
==== Senators ====
- His Majesty's appointee:

=== Dewan Rakyat (House of Representatives) ===
Warisan has 3 MPs in the House of Representatives.

State	No.	Parliament constituency	Member	Party
Sabah	P169	Kota Belud	Isnaraissah Munirah Majilis	Warisan
Sabah	P188	Lahad Datu	Yusof Apdal	Warisan
Sabah	P189	Semporna	Shafie Apdal	Warisan
Total	Sabah (3)			

=== Dewan Undangan Negeri (State Legislative Assembly) ===
Sabah State Legislative Assembly

25 / 79

State	No.	Parliamentary constituency	No.	State constituency	Member	Party
Sabah	P169	Kota Belud	N10	Usukan	Isnaraissah Munirah Majilis	Warisan
Sabah	P171	Sepanggar	N17	Darau	Azhar Matussin	Warisan
Sabah	P171	Sepanggar	N18	Inanam	Edna Jessica Majimbun	Warisan
Sabah	P172	Kota Kinabalu	N19	Likas	Tham Yun Fook	Warisan
Sabah	P172	Kota Kinabalu	N20	Api-Api	Loi Kok Liang	Warisan
Sabah	P172	Kota Kinabalu	N21	Luyang	Samuel Wong Tshun Chuen	Warisan
Sabah	P173	Putatan	N22	Tanjung Aru	Junz Wong Hong Jun	Warisan
Sabah	P174	Penampang	N25	Kapayan	Chin Tek Ming	Warisan
Sabah	P176	Kimanis	N30	Bongawan	Daud Yusof	Warisan
Sabah	P178	Sipitang	N35	Sindumin	Yusri Pungut	Warisan
Sabah	P184	Libaran	N50	Gum-Gum	Arunarsin Taib	Warisan
Sabah	P184	Libaran	N52	Sungai Sibuga	Nurulalsah Hassan Alban	Warisan
Sabah	P185	Batu Sapi	N53	Sekong	Alias Sani	Warisan
Sabah	P185	Batu Sapi	N54	Karamunting	Alex Wong Tshun Khee	Warisan
Sabah	P186	Sandakan	N55	Elopura	Calvin Chong Ket Kiun	Warisan
Sabah	P186	Sandakan	N56	Tanjong Papat	Alex Thien Ching Qiang	Warisan
Sabah	P188	Lahad Datu	N60	Tungku	Assaffal Samsul Kamal	Warisan
Sabah	P188	Lahad Datu	N61	Segama	Muhammad Abdul Karim	Warisan
Sabah	P188	Lahad Datu	N62	Silam	Yusof Apdal	Warisan
Sabah	P189	Semporna	N64	Sulabayan	Jaujan Sambakong	Warisan
Sabah	P189	Semporna	N65	Senallang	Mohd Shafie Apdal	Warisan
Sabah	P189	Semporna	N66	Bugaya	Jamil Hamzah	Warisan
Sabah	P190	Tawau	N69	Sri Tanjong	Justin Wong Yung Bin	Warisan
Sabah	P191	Kalabakan	N72	Merotai	Sarifuddin Hata	Warisan
Sabah	P191	Kalabakan	N73	Sebatik	Manahing Tinggilani	Warisan
Total		Sabah (25)				

== Government offices ==
=== Ministerial posts ===
Portfolio	Office Bearer	Constituency
Deputy Minister of Science, Technology and Innovation	Mohammad Yusof Apdal	Lahad Datu

=== State governments ===
- Sabah (2018–2020)

Note: bold as Premier/Chief Minister, italic as junior partner

=== Official opposition ===
State	Leader type	Member	State Constituency
Sabah	Opposition Leader	Shafie Apdal	Senallang

== Election results ==
=== General election results ===
Election	Total seats won	Seats contested	Total votes	Voting Percentage	Outcome of election	Election leader
2018	8 / 222	17	280,520	2.32%	▲8 seats; Governing coalition later Opposition coalition (allied with PH)	Shafie Apdal
2022	3 / 222	51	300,497	1.93%	▼5 seats; Governing coalition (allied with PH, BN, GPS and GRS)	Shafie Apdal

=== State election results ===
State assembly	Election	Votes	%	Seats	Won/contested	+/–	Position (Note: As part of electoral coalition.)	Status
Perlis	2022	2,739	1.8	0 / 15	0 / 9	Steady	4th	No seats
Kedah	2023	Did not contest						No seats
Kelantan	2023	Did not contest						No seats
Terengganu	2023	Did not contest						No seats
Penang	2023	Did not contest						No seats
Perak	2022	1,971	0.1	0 / 59	0 / 8	Steady	5th	No seats
Pahang	2022	Did not contest						No seats
Selangor	2023	Did not contest						No seats
Negeri Sembilan	2026	Did not contest						No seats
Malacca	2026	Did not contest						No seats
Johor	2026	Did not contest						No seats
Sabah	2025	288,703	25.6	25 / 73	25 / 73	▲2	2nd	Opposition
Sarawak	2021	Did not contest						No seats

Note

State election	State Legislative Assembly													
State election	Perlis	Kedah	Kelantan	Terengganu	Penang	Perak	Pahang	Selangor	Negeri Sembilan	Malacca	Johor	Sabah	Sarawak	Total won / Total contested
2/3 majority	2 / 3	2 / 3	2 / 3	2 / 3	2 / 3	2 / 3	2 / 3	2 / 3	2 / 3	2 / 3	2 / 3	2 / 3	2 / 3	
2018												21 / 60		21 / 45
2020												23 / 73		23 / 46
2022											0 / 56			0 / 6
2022	0 / 15					0 / 59	0 / 42							0 / 17
2025												25 / 73		25 / 73

== See also ==
- Parti Impian Sabah (similar party)
