= Shafie cabinet =

- 19th Cabinet of Sabah
- 2018–2020
- Date formed: 16 May 2018
- Date dissolved: 29 September 2020

People and organisations
- Head of state: Juhar Mahiruddin
- Head of government: Shafie Apdal (WARISAN)
- Total no. of members: 11
- Member parties: Sabah Heritage Party (WARISAN); Pakatan Harapan (PH); Democratic Action Party (DAP); People's Justice Party (PKR); United Progressive Kinabalu Organisation (UPKO)
- Status in legislature: Coalition government with confidence & supply from PH and UPKO
- Opposition parties: Malaysian United Indigenous Party of Sabah (BERSATU Sabah); United Sabah Party (PBS); Homeland Solidarity Party (STAR); United Malays National Organisation of Sabah (UMNO Sabah)
- Opposition leader: Jeffrey Kitingan (STAR)

History
- Election: 2018 Sabah state election
- Legislature term: 15th Sabah State Legislative Assembly
- Budget: 2019, 2020
- Predecessor: Fifth Musa cabinet
- Successor: Hajiji cabinet

The Shafie cabinet of Sabah took office on 16 May 2018.

The cabinet consists of ministers and assistant ministers from the Sabah Heritage Party (WARISAN), the United Progressive Kinabalu Organisation (UPNO), Democratic Action Party (DAP) and People's Justice Party (PKR).

== Cabinet ==
=== Ministers ===
Portfolio	Officeholder	Party	Constituency	Term start	Term end
Chief Minister	Datuk Seri Panglima Mohd. Shafie Apdal MP	WARISAN	Senallang	12 May 2018	29 September 2020
Deputy Chief Minister	Datuk Seri Panglima Wilfred Madius Tangau MP	UPKO	Nominated member	16 May 2018	29 September 2020
Deputy Chief Minister	Datuk Christina Liew MP	PH (PKR)	Api-Api	16 May 2018	29 September 2020
Deputy Chief Minister	Datuk Jaujan Sambakong	WARISAN	Sulabayan	16 May 2018	29 September 2020
Minister of Finance	Datuk Seri Panglima Mohd. Shafie Apdal MP	WARISAN	Senallang	16 May 2018	29 September 2020
Minister of Trade and Industry	Datuk Seri Panglima Wilfred Madius Tangau MP	UPKO	Nominated member	16 May 2018	29 September 2020
Minister of Tourism, Culture and Environment	Datuk Christina Liew MP	PH (PKR)	Api-Api	16 May 2018	29 September 2020
Minister of Housing and Local Government	Datuk Jaujan Sambakong	WARISAN	Sulabayan	16 May 2018	29 September 2020
Minister of Infrastructure Development	Datuk Peter Anthony	WARISAN	Melalap	16 May 2018	29 September 2020
Minister of People's Health and Wellbeing	Datuk Stephen Wong Tien Fatt MP	PH (DAP)	Nominated member	16 May 2018	28 March 2019
Minister of People's Health and Wellbeing	Datuk Frankie Poon Ming Fung	PH (DAP)	Tanjong Papat	17 May 2019	29 September 2020
Minister of Agriculture and Food Industries	Datuk Junz Wong	WARISAN	Tanjung Aru	16 May 2018	29 September 2020
Minister of Education and Innovation	Datuk Dr. Yusof Yacob	WARISAN	Sindumin	16 May 2018	29 September 2020
Minister of Rural Development	Datuk Ewon Benedick	UPKO	Kadamaian	16 May 2018	29 September 2020
Minister of Law and Native Affairs	Aidi Moktar	WARISAN	Pantai Manis	16 May 2018	29 September 2020
Minister of Youth and Sports	Datuk Frankie Poon Ming Fung	PH (DAP)	Tanjong Papat	16 May 2018	17 May 2019
Minister of Youth and Sports	Phoong Jin Zhe	PH (DAP)	Luyang	17 May 2019	29 September 2020

=== Assistant Ministers ===
Portfolio	Officeholder	Party	Constituency	Term start	Term end
Assistant Minister in the Chief Minister's Department	Datuk Jimmy Wong Sze Phin	PH (DAP)	Sri Tanjong	16 May 2018	29 September 2020
Assistant Minister in the Chief Minister's Department	Arifin Asgali	WARISAN	Sekong	16 May 2018	29 September 2020
Assistant Minister of Finance	Kenny Chua Teck Ho	PH (PKR)	Inanam	16 May 2018	29 September 2020
Assistant Minister of Finance	Sarifuddin Hata	WARISAN	Merotai	16 May 2018	29 September 2020
Assistant Minister of Trade and Industry	Ben Chong Chen Bin	WARISAN	Tanjong Kapor	16 May 2018	29 September 2020
Assistant Minister of Trade and Industry	Azhar Matussin	WARISAN	Karambunai	16 May 2018	29 September 2020
Assistant Minister of Tourism, Culture and Environment	Assaffal P. Alian	WARISAN	Tungku	16 May 2018	29 September 2020
Assistant Minister of Housing and Local Government	George Hiew Vun Zin	WARISAN	Karamunting	16 May 2018	29 September 2020
Assistant Minister of Infrastructure Development	Datuk Abdul Muis Picho	WARISAN	Sebatik	16 May 2018	29 September 2020
Assistant Minister of People's Health and Wellbeing	Norazlinah Arif	WARISAN	Kunak	16 May 2018	29 September 2020
Assistant Minister of Agriculture and Food Industries	Dr. Daud Yusof	WARISAN	Bongawan	16 May 2018	29 September 2020
Assistant Minister of Education and Innovation	Mohammad Mohamarin	WARISAN	Banggi	16 May 2018	29 September 2020
Assistant Minister of Education and Innovation	Jennifer Lasimbang	WARISAN	Moyog	16 May 2018	29 September 2020
Assistant Minister of Rural Development	Dumi Pg. Masdal	WARISAN	Lahad Datu	16 May 2018	29 September 2020
Assistant Minister of Rural Development	Rasinin Kautis	WARISAN	Liawan	16 May 2018	29 September 2020
Assistant Minister of Law and Native Affairs	Datuk Uda Sulai	WARISAN	Petagas	16 May 2018	29 September 2020
Assistant Minister of Law and Native Affairs	Jannie Lasimbang	PH (DAP)	Kapayan	16 May 2018	29 September 2020
Assistant Minister of Youth and Sports	Arunarsin Taib	WARISAN	Gum-Gum	16 May 2018	29 September 2020
