= 2020 Kimanis by-election =

By-election in Malaysia in 2020

← 2018	18 January 2020	2022 →

P176 Kimanis seat in the Dewan Rakyat
	BN	WARISAN
Candidate	Mohamad Alamin	Karim Bujang
Party	UMNO	WARISAN
Alliance	BN	PH-WARISAN-UPKO
Popular vote	12,706	10,677
Percentage	54.34%	45.66%
- .
MP before election
Anifah Aman (disqualified)
Independent
Elected MP
Mohamad Alamin
Barisan Nasional (UMNO)

The 2020 Kimanis by-election is a by-election held on 18 January 2020 for the Dewan Rakyat seat of Kimanis. The seat was declared vacant after the Federal Court on 2 December 2019 upheld the Election Court's ruling earlier on 16 August, nullifying the sitting Member of Parliament (MP), Anifah Aman's victory in the 2018 general election (GE14). Anifah was the former Minister of Foreign Affairs from 2009 to 2018 and formerly a member of United Malays National Organisation (UMNO) part of the Barisan Nasional (BN) coalition until he left to become independent, despite the fact that he had been a 4-term MP for Kimanis since 2004 and had just retained the seat under BN in the 2018 election a few months prior.

The Election Commission (EC) had set the nomination day on 4 January, early voting on 14 January and polling day for 18 January 2020 with a 14-day campaign period. The electoral roll in the parliamentary constituency to be used would be the one up to the third quarter of 2019 which was last updated on 9 December 2019 with a total of 29,664 voters made up of 52,698 ordinary voters, 9 early voters while 1 absentee voters (who are abroad). Kimanis which consists of the Bongawan and Membakut state seats, has about 68% Muslim-bumiputras voters of mainly Bruneian Malay, Bisaya and Bajau communities, some 25% non-Muslim bumiputras voters of mainly ethnic Kadazan-Dusun and Murut, while the remaining 7% were Chinese and others.

== Nomination ==
On 11 December 2019, Sabah Pakatan Harapan (PH) Chairman and Deputy Chief Minister Christina Liew said that PH will pave way and support ally, Sabah Heritage Party (WARISAN) to field its candidate. Previously, the Malaysian United Indigenous Party (BERSATU) had offered to contest the by-election but decided to support the WARISAN candidate instead. Karim Bujang, the WARISAN candidate for Kimanis in GE14 who had lost and filed the election petition, was once again nominated as WARISAN's candidate for the by-election.

Sabah UMNO chief, Bung Mokhtar Radin confirmed that BN will contest the by-election by fielding a candidate from UMNO. BN decided to field UMNO Kimanis division chief and former Bongawan assemblyman, Mohamad Alamin as their candidate for the by-election.

The Pan-Malaysian Islamic Party (PAS) has announced its support for the BN candidate in the by-election. PAS secretary-general, Takiyuddin Hassan, said that the party will mobilise its election campaign machinery to support the BN candidate.

Anifah Aman, the incumbent prior to the disqualification, denied that he will contest the seat again. Anifah also said that he will return in the coming 15th General Election instead. Anifah has since declared his support for the BN candidate in the by-election.

The Liberal Democratic Party (LDP), Homeland Solidarity Party (STAR), United Sabah National Organisation (USNO Baru), Sabah Progressive Party (SAPP) and the Sabah United Party (PBS) have declined to contest the by-election, paving the way for a possible straight fight between BN and Warisan.

On Nomination Day, BN's Mohamad Alamin and WARISAN's Karim Bujang filed their nomination papers, setting the stage for a two-cornered fight for the parliamentary seat.

== Controversies and issues ==
The main issues in the by-election are not national matters but local issues such as the Sabah Temporary Pass or Pas Sementara Sabah (PSS) for Filipino refugees immigrants, bread-and-butter and job opportunities issues.

== Election results ==
Malaysian general by-election, 18 January 2020: Kimanis Upon the disqualification of incumbent, Anifah Aman
Party	Candidate	Votes	%	∆%
BN	Mohamad Alamin	12,706	54.34%	+6.60
Sabah Heritage Party	Karim Bujang	10,677	45.66%	-1.43
Total valid votes		23,383	98.65%	
Total rejected ballots		320		
Turnout		23,703	79.92	
Registered electors		29,664		
Majority		2,029	8.68	
BN hold		Swing		+8.06

=== Results according to polling districts ===
State Constituency	Polling District	Polling District Code	Polling Station	Electors （2016）
Bongawan（N23）	Batu Enam	176/23/01	SK Our Lady	2,098
Bongawan（N23）	Kabang	176/23/02	SK Kayau	1,338
Bongawan（N23）	Gadong	176/23/03	SK Belatik	777
Bongawan（N23）	Bongawan	176/23/04	SK Nyaris-Nyaris	1,924
Bongawan（N23）	Kimanis Madahan	176/23/05	SK Madahan	1,030
Bongawan（N23）	Kimanis Estate	176/23/06	SK Kimanis	2,098
Bongawan（N23）	Simpangan	176/23/07	SJK (C) Cheng Ming	1,188
Bongawan（N23）	Kuala Pus	176/23/08	SK Sumbiling	828
Bongawan（N23）	Bongawan Estate	176/23/09	SK Viging Ulu	568
Bongawan（N23）	Seladan	176/23/10	SMK Bongawan	3,108
Membakut（N24）	Binsulok	176/24/01	SK Binsulok	1,221
Membakut（N24）	Pimping	176/24/02	SK Pingiran Jaya Pimping	2,764
Membakut（N24）	Brunei	176/24/03	SK Kg. Brunei	1,611
Membakut（N24）	Bandau	176/24/04	SK Bandau	1,860
Membakut（N24）	Membakut	176/24/05	SMK Membakut	1,188
Membakut（N24）	Lumat	176/24/06	SK Lumat	845
Membakut（N24）	Mawao	176/24/07	SMK St. Patrick	1,528
Membakut（N24）	Sinuka	176/24/08	SK Sinoko	587
Membakut（N24）	Dindong	176/24/09	SK Kg. Bambangan	380
Post & Early Votes	Undi Pos			35
Post & Early Votes	Undi Awal			9

== Previous result ==
Malaysian general election, 2018: Kimanis
Party	Candidate	Votes	%	∆%
BN	Anifah Aman @ Haniff Amman	11,942	47.71	12.95
Sabah Heritage Party	Karim Bujang	11,786	47.09	+ 47.09
Sabah People's Hope Party	Jaafar Ismail	1,300	5.19	+ 5.19
Total valid votes		25,028	100.00	
Total rejected ballots		385		
Unreturned ballots		106		
Turnout		25,519	86.16	
Registered electors		29,618		
Majority		156	0.62	
BN hold		Swing		
Source(s) "His Majesty's Government Gazette - Notice of Contested Election, Parliament for the State of Sabah [P.U. (B) 246/2018]" (PDF). Attorney General's Chambers of Malaysia. 3 May 2018. "Federal Government Gazette - Results of Contested Election and Statements of the Poll after the Official Addition of Votes, Parliamentary Constituencies for the State of Sabah [P.U. (B) 320/2018]" (PDF). Attorney General's Chambers of Malaysia. 28 May 2018. Archived from the original (PDF) on 29 December 2019.

== Aftermath ==
After the Sheraton Move, Mohamad was appointed as Deputy Minister of Education II in the Ismail Sabri Yaakob cabinet. He eventually successfully retained his parliamentary seat in the 2022 general election.
