= Annuar Ayub =

Malaysian politician

Yang Berbahagia Datuk Annuar Ayub PGDK
- أنوار أيوب

Member of the Sabah State Legislative Assembly for Liawan
- In office 26 September 2020 – 29 November 2025
- Preceded by: Rasinin Kautis (WARISAN)
- Succeeded by: Nik Mohd Nadzri Nik Zawawi (BN-UMNO)
- Majority: 641 (2020)

Vice President of the Homeland Solidarity Party (Muslim Bumiputera) (2018–2024), (Appointed) (since 2024)
- Incumbent
- Assumed office 2018 Serving with Robert Tawik (2018–2021) & Edward Linggu (2018–2021) & Joel Masilung (2018–2021) & Suwah Buleh @ Bulleh (2018–2021) & Fredderin Tualiang (2018–2021) & Saban Sawayan (2018–2021) & Fung Len Fui (2018–2021) & Abidin Madingkir (Non-Muslim Bumiputera) (since 2021) & Paul Porodong (Non-Muslim Bumiputera) (2021–2024) & Suling Isib (Non-Muslim Bumiputera) (since 2024) & Apas Nawawi Saking (Muslim Bumiputera) (since 2021) & Mohd Lin Harun (Muslim Bumiputera) (since 2024) & Stephen Teo (Chinese) (2021–2024) & Kong Soon Choi (Chinese) (since 2024) & Beverley Natalie Koh (Chinese) (since 2024) & Flovia Ng (Appointed) (since 2024)
- President: Jeffrey Kitingan

Personal details
- Born: Annuar bin Ayub; 29 August 1961 (age 64) Liawan, Keningau, Crown Colony of North Borneo
- Party: Homeland Solidarity Party (STAR)
- Other political affiliations: Gabungan Rakyat Sabah (GRS)
- Spouse: Tengku Adlina Marita Tengku Zainal Adlin
- Relations: Musa Aman (Uncle); Anifah Aman (Uncle); Yamani Hafez Musa (First cousin)
- Occupation: Politician
- Profession: Political Analyst (Political Field Profession)

Annuar bin Ayub (also known as Annuar Ayub Aman, abbreviation AAA; born 29 August 1961) is a Malaysian politician who has served as Member of Sabah State Legislative Assembly (MLA) for Liawan since September 2020. He is a member of the Homeland Solidarity Party (STAR) a component party of the Gabungan Rakyat Sabah (GRS) and formerly Perikatan Nasional (PN) coalitions He has served as a STAR Vice President since 2016.

== Political career ==
Annuar Ayub started his political career by joining STAR Party on 18 December 2018. He has become a key member of Sabah STAR Party because of the contributions he has given to people around Keningau, especially in his own state constituency of Liawan. In 2020, he became a Member of the Sabah State Legislative Assembly for the Liawan constituency (representing GRS-STAR), defeating the incumbent, Rasinin Kautis and as a result of his electoral victory, he was appointed as the Vice President of Sabah STAR Party representing the Muslim Bumiputera quota.

== Family and personal background ==
He is the son of Datuk Ayub Haji Aman (born 1941), a retired politician who was once a state cabinet minister during the Sabah People's United Party rule from 1976 to 1986 under the Chief Ministership of Harris Salleh. His uncle, Musa Aman, also well-known as Tun Musa Aman since 2025 is the former Chief Minister of Sabah from 2003 until 2018 and also the 11th Governor of Sabah, while his other uncle, Anifah Aman is a former Minister of Foreign Affairs of Malaysia and was later appointed President of Parti Cinta Sabah which contested in the 2020 Sabah state election.

His paternal first cousin, Yamani Hafez Musa was once a Member of Parliament for Sipitang in the 14th Malaysian Parliament term.

== Election results ==
Sabah State Legislative Assembly
Year	Constituency	Candidate	Votes	Pct	Opponent(s)	Votes	Pct	Ballots cast	Majority	Turnout
2020	N41 Liawan	Annuar Ayub Aman (STAR)	4,628	39.12%	Rasinin Kautis (WARISAN)	3,987	33.70%	11,831	641	67.81%
2020	N41 Liawan	Annuar Ayub Aman (STAR)	4,628	39.12%	Jake Nointin (IND)	1,835	15.51%	11,831	641	67.81%
2020	N41 Liawan	Annuar Ayub Aman (STAR)	4,628	39.12%	Daniel Kinsik (PBS)	1,084	9.16%	11,831	641	67.81%
2020	N41 Liawan	Annuar Ayub Aman (STAR)	4,628	39.12%	Mazlan Abdul Latiff (PCS)	209	1.77%	11,831	641	67.81%
2020	N41 Liawan	Annuar Ayub Aman (STAR)	4,628	39.12%	Yatin Kukung (LDP)	45	0.38%	11,831	641	67.81%
2020	N41 Liawan	Annuar Ayub Aman (STAR)	4,628	39.12%	Leong Chau Chu (USNO Baru)	43	0.36%	11,831	641	67.81%

== Honours ==
- Sabah
  - Commander of the Order of Kinabalu (PGDK) – Datuk (2016)
