= Kimanis (federal constituency) =

Federal constituency of Sabah, Malaysia

Kimanis (P176)
Sabah constituency

Federal constituency
- Legislature: Dewan Rakyat
- MP: Mohamad Alamin; BN
- Constituency created: 1966
- Constituency abolished: 1995
- Constituency re-created: 2003
- First contested: 1969
- Last contested: 2022

Demographics
- Population (2020): 50,408
- Electors (2025): 42,582
- Area (km²): 949
- Pop. density (per km²): 53.1

Kimanis is a federal constituency in West Coast and Interior Division (Papar District and Beaufort District), Sabah, Malaysia, that has been represented in the Dewan Rakyat from 1971 to 1995 and again from 2004 to present.

The federal constituency was created in the 1966 redistribution and is mandated to return a single member to the Dewan Rakyat under the first past the post voting system.

== Demographics ==
https://ge15.orientaldaily.com.my/seats/sabah/p

Ethnic breakdown of Kimanis's electorate as of 2022
1. Sabah Bumiputera (67.2%)
2. Malay-Muslim Bumiputera (23.1%)
3. Other ethnicities (5.00%)
4. Chinese (4.60%)

As of 2020, Kimanis has a population of 50,408 people.

Age breakdown of Kimanis's electorate as of 2022
1. 18-20 (6.35%)
2. 21-29 (20.1%)
3. 30-39 (23.4%)
4. 40-49 (18.8%)
5. 50-59 (15.3%)
6. 60-69 (9.75%)
7. 70-79 (3.87%)
8. 80-89 (1.44%)
9. above 90 (0.99%)
Gender breakdown of Kimanis's electorate as of 2022
1. Male (50.3%)
2. Female (49.7%)

== History ==
It was abolished in 1995 when it was redistributed. It was re-created in 2003.

=== Poling districts ===
According to the gazette issued on 21 November 2025, the Kimanis constituency has a total of 19 polling districts.

State constituency	Poling Districts	Code	Location
Bongawan（N30）	Batu Enam	176/30/01	SK Our Lady; SK Langkawit; SK Lingan
Bongawan（N30）	Kabang	176/30/02	SK Kayau; SK Kambizaan
Bongawan（N30）	Gadong	176/30/03	SK Belatik
Bongawan（N30）	Bongawan	176/30/04	SK Nyaris-Nyaris
Bongawan（N30）	Kimanis Mandahan	176/30/05	SMK Kimanis
Bongawan（N30）	Kimanis Estate	176/30/06	SMA Kimanis
Bongawan（N30）	Simpangan	176/30/07	SJK (C) Cheng Ming
Bongawan（N30）	Kuala Pus	176/30/08	SK Sumbiling
Bongawan（N30）	Bongawan Estate	176/30/09	SK Viging Ulu
Bongawan（N30）	Seladan	176/30/10	SMK Bongawan; SK Pekan Bongawan
Membakut (N31)	Binsulok	176/31/01	SK Binsulok
Membakut (N31)	Pimping	176/31/02	SMK Membakut II
Membakut (N31)	Brunei	176/31/03	SK Kg. Brunei
Membakut (N31)	Bandau	176/31/04	SK Bandau; SK St. Patrick
Membakut (N31)	Membakut	176/31/05	SMK Membakut
Membakut (N31)	Lumat	176/31/06	SK Lumat
Membakut (N31)	Mawao	176/31/07	SMK St. Patrick
Membakut (N31)	Sinuka	176/31/08	SK Sinoko
Membakut (N31)	Dindong	176/31/09	SK Kg. Bambangan

=== Representation history ===
Members of Parliament for Kimanis
Parliament	No	Years	Member	Party	Vote Share
Constituency created
		1969–1971	Parliament was suspended		
3rd	P111	1971–1973	Pengiran Tahir Pengiran Petra (ڤڠيرن طاهر ڤڠيرن ڤيترا)	USNO	Uncontested
3rd	P111	1973–1974	Pengiran Tahir Pengiran Petra (ڤڠيرن طاهر ڤڠيرن ڤيترا)	BN (USNO)	Uncontested
4th	P125	1974–1977	Pengiran Tahir Pengiran Petra (ڤڠيرن طاهر ڤڠيرن ڤيترا)	BN (USNO)	Uncontested
4th	P125	1977–1978	Pengiran Aliuddin Pengiran Tahir (ڤڠيرن عليالدين ڤڠيرن طاهر)	BN (USNO)	70,77; 61.65%
5th	P125	1978–1981	Pengiran Aliuddin Pengiran Tahir (ڤڠيرن عليالدين ڤڠيرن طاهر)	Independent	6,968; 60.89%
5th	P125	1981-1982	Pengiran Othman Pengiran Rauf (ڤڠيرن عثمان ڤڠيرن راوف)	BN (BERJAYA)	Uncontested
6th	P125	1982–1986	Pengiran Othman Pengiran Rauf (ڤڠيرن عثمان ڤڠيرن راوف)	BN (BERJAYA)	7,555; 58.59%
7th	P147	1986–1990	Nurnikman Abdullah (نورنعمن عبدالله)	BN (USNO)	5,603; 61.58%
8th	P147	1990–1995	Nurnikman Abdullah (نورنعمن عبدالله)	GR (PBS)	7,618; 56.01%
Constituency abolished, split into Beaufort and Papar
Constituency re-created from Beaufort and Papar
11th	P176	2004–2008	Anifah Aman @ Haniff Amman (عنيفه بن أمان حنيف أمان)	BN (UMNO)	9,655; 67.98%
12th	P176	2008–2013	Anifah Aman @ Haniff Amman (عنيفه بن أمان حنيف أمان)	BN (UMNO)	10,242; 60.78%
13th	P176	2013–2018	Anifah Aman @ Haniff Amman (عنيفه بن أمان حنيف أمان)	BN (UMNO)	13,754; 60.66%
14th	P176	2018	Anifah Aman @ Haniff Amman (عنيفه بن أمان حنيف أمان)	BN (UMNO)	11,942; 47.71%
14th	P176	2018–2019	Anifah Aman @ Haniff Amman (عنيفه بن أمان حنيف أمان)	Independent	11,942; 47.71%
14th	P176	2020–2022	Mohamad Alamin (محمد بن الأمين)	BN (UMNO)	12,706; 54.48%
15th	P176	2022–present	Mohamad Alamin (محمد بن الأمين)	BN (UMNO)	13,004; 41.86%

=== State constituency ===
Parliamentary constituency	State constituency					
Parliamentary constituency	1967–1974	1974–1985	1985–1995	1995–2004	2004–2020	2020–present
Kimanis	Bongawan				Bongawan	
Kimanis	Kuala Penyu					
Kimanis					Membakut	
Kimanis		Papar				

=== Historical boundaries ===
State Constituency	State constituency				
State Constituency	1966	1974	1984	2003	2019
Bongawan	Batu Enam; Bongawan; Kimanis; Membakut; Seladan	Binsuluk; Bongawan; Kimanis; Membakut; Seladan	Batu Enam; Bongawan; Kimanis; Membakut; Seladan	Batu Enam; Bongawan; Kimanis; Kuala Pus; Seladan	
Kuala Penyu	Kuala Penyu; Membakut; Sawangan; Tempurung; Tenggilung	Kalugus; Kuala Penyu; Sawangan; Tembayang; Tenggilung	Binsuluk; Kalugus; Kuala Penyu; Sawangan; Menumbok		
Membakut				Binsuluk; Kampung Brunei; Lumat; Membakut; Sinoko	
Papar		Benoni; Kawang; Kayau; Limbahau; Papar			

=== Current state assembly members ===
No.	State Constituency	Member	Coalition (Party)
N30	Bongawan	Daud Yusof	WARISAN
N31	Membakut	Mohd. Arifin Mohd. Arif	GRS (GAGASAN)

=== Local governments & postcodes ===
No	State Constituency	Local Government	Postcode
N30	Bongawan	Papar District Council	89600 Papar; 89700 Bongawan; 89720 Membakut; 89800 Beaufort
N31	Membakut	Beaufort District Council	89600 Papar; 89700 Bongawan; 89720 Membakut; 89800 Beaufort

== Election results ==
Malaysian general election, 2022
Party	Candidate	Votes	%	∆%
BN	Mohamad Alamin	13,004	41.86	▼12.62
Heritage	Daud Yusof	9,967	32.08	▼13.44
KDM	Amat Mohd Yusof	4,013	12.92	▲12.92
PH	Rowindy Lawrance	3,931	12.65	▲12.65
PEJUANG	Yusop Osman	153	0.49	▲0.49
Total valid votes		31,068	100.00	
Total rejected ballots		344		
Unreturned ballots		79		
Turnout		31,491	76.22	▼3.70
Registered electors		40,763		
Majority		3,037	9.78	▲0.84
BN hold		Swing		
Source(s) https://lom.agc.gov.my/ilims/upload/portal/akta/outputp/1753262/PUB619_2022.pdf

Malaysian general by-election, 18 January 2020 Upon the disqualification of incumbent, Anifah Aman
Party	Candidate	Votes	%	∆%
BN	Mohamad Alamin	12,706	54.48	▲6.77
Sabah Heritage Party	Karim Bujang	10,677	45.52	▼1.57
Total valid votes		23,381		
Total rejected ballots		320		
Unreturned ballots		5		
Turnout		23,708	79.92	▼6.24
Registered electors		29,664		
Majority		2,091	8.94	▲8.32
BN hold		Swing		

Malaysian general election, 2018
Party	Candidate	Votes	%	∆%
BN	Anifah Aman	11,942	47.71	▼12.95
Sabah Heritage Party	Karim Bujang	11,786	47.09	▲47.09
Sabah People's Hope Party	Jaafar Ismail	1,300	5.19	▲5.19
Total valid votes		25,028	100.00	
Total rejected ballots		385		
Unreturned ballots		106		
Turnout		25,519	86.16	▼0.85
Registered electors		29,618		
Majority		156	0.62	▼34.20
BN hold		Swing		
Source(s) "His Majesty's Government Gazette - Notice of Contested Election, Parliament for the State of Sabah [P.U. (B) 246/2018]" (PDF). Attorney General's Chambers of Malaysia. 3 May 2018. "Federal Government Gazette - Results of Contested Election and Statements of the Poll after the Official Addition of Votes, Parliamentary Constituencies for the State of Sabah [P.U. (B) 320/2018]" (PDF). Attorney General's Chambers of Malaysia. 28 May 2018. Archived from the original (PDF) on 2019-12-29.

Malaysian general election, 2013
Party	Candidate	Votes	%	∆%
BN	Anifah Aman @ Haniff Amman	13,754	60.66	▼0.12
PKR	Jaafar Ismail	8,031	35.42	▲25.84
SAPP	Jamil William Core	650	2.87	▲2.87
STAR	Lusin Balangon	240	1.06	▲1.06
Total valid votes		22,675	100.00	
Total rejected ballots		453		
Unreturned ballots		42		
Turnout		23,170	87.01	▲8.92
Registered electors		26,628		
Majority		5,723	34.82	▲2.46
BN hold		Swing		
Source(s) "Federal Government Gazette - Notice of Contested Election, Parliament for the State of Sabah [P.U. (B) 183/2013]" (PDF). Attorney General's Chambers of Malaysia. 26 April 2013. Archived from the original (PDF) on 2018-09-30. "Federal Government Gazette - Results of Contested Election and Statements of the Poll after the Official Addition of Votes, Parliamentary Constituencies for the State of Sabah [P.U. (B) 224/2013]" (PDF). Attorney General's Chambers of Malaysia. 22 May 2013. Archived from the original (PDF) on 2018-09-30.

Malaysian general election, 2008
Party	Candidate	Votes	%	∆%
BN	Anifah Aman @ Haniff Amman	10,242	60.78	▼7.20
Independent	Jaafar Ismail	4,789	28.42	▲28.42
PKR	Ismail Bungsu	1,615	9.58	▼22.44
Independent	Benjamin Basintal	205	1.22	▲1.22
Total valid votes		16,851	100.00	
Total rejected ballots		500		
Unreturned ballots		16		
Turnout		17,367	78.09	▲7.98
Registered electors		22,239		
Majority		5,453	32.36	▼3.60
BN hold		Swing		

Malaysian general election, 2004
Party	Candidate	Votes	%	∆%
BN	Anifah Aman @ Haniff Amman	9,655	67.98	
PKR	Awang Tangah Awang Amin	4,547	32.02	
Total valid votes		14,202	100.00	
Total rejected ballots		500		
Unreturned ballots		424		
Turnout		15,126	70.11	
Registered electors		21,574		
Majority		5,108	35.96	
BN gain from PBS		Swing		?

Malaysian general election, 1990
Party	Candidate	Votes	%	∆%
PBS	Nurnikman Abdullah	7,618	56.01	▲56.01
Independent	Mohd Zahari Mohd Zinin	4,296	31.58	▲31.58
Independent	Pengiran Aliuddin Pengiran Tahir	1,688	12.41	▲12.41
Total valid votes		13,602	100.00	
Total rejected ballots		120		
Unreturned ballots		0		
Turnout		13,722	68.17	▲8.81
Registered electors		20,130		
Majority		3,322	24.43	▼15.61
PBS gain from BN		Swing		?

Malaysian general election, 1986
Party	Candidate	Votes	%	∆%
BN	Nurnikman Abdullah	5,603	61.58	▲2.99
PAS	Pengiran Aliuddin Pengiran Tahir	1,960	21.54	▲21.54
BERJAYA	Sebastian Dirih Anjim	1,535	16.87	▲16.87
Total valid votes		9,098	100.00	
Total rejected ballots		120		
Unreturned ballots		0		
Turnout		9,218	59.36	▼7.60
Registered electors		15,528		
Majority		3,643	40.04	▲6.82
BN hold		Swing		

Malaysian general election, 1982
Party	Candidate	Votes	%	∆%
BN	Pengiran Othman Pengiran Rauf	7,555	58.59	▲58.89
Independent	Awang Ahmad Pengiran Mokhtar	3,271	25.37	▲25.37
PASOK	Andrew Appolonius	1,342	10.41	▲10.41
Independent	Awang Nawawi Pengiran Ahmad	727	5.64	▲5.64
Total valid votes		12,895	100.00	
Total rejected ballots		283		
Unreturned ballots		0		
Turnout		13,178	66.96	
Registered electors		19,679		
Majority		4,284	33.22	
BN hold		Swing		

Malaysian general by-election, 9 April 1981 Upon the resignation of incumbent, Pengiran Aliuddin Pengiran Tahir
Party	Candidate	Votes	%	∆%
On the nomination day, Pengiran Othman Pengiran Rauf won uncontested.
BN	Pengiran Othman Pengiran Rauf			
Total valid votes			100.00	
Total rejected ballots				
Unreturned ballots				
Turnout				
Registered electors				
Majority				
BN hold		Swing		

Malaysian general election, 1978
Party	Candidate	Votes	%	∆%
BN	Pengiran Aliuddin Pengiran Tahir	6,968	60.89	▲23.30
Independent	Md. Hussin Aman	4,476	39.11	▲38.35
Total valid votes		11,444	100.00	
Total rejected ballots		288		
Unreturned ballots		0		
Turnout		11,732	67.56	
Registered electors		17,365		
Majority		2,492	21.78	▼2.46
BN gain from Independent		Swing		?

Malaysian general by-election, 29 January 1977 Upon the death of incumbent, Pengiran Tahir Pengiran Petra
Party	Candidate	Votes	%	∆%
Independent	Pengiran Aliuddin Pengiran Tahir	7,077	61.65	
BN	Karim Ghani	4,315	37.59	
Independent	Md. Hussin Aman	87	0.76	
Total valid votes		11,479	100.00	
Total rejected ballots				
Unreturned ballots				
Turnout				
Registered electors		15,643		
Majority		2,762	24.24	
Independent gain from BN		Swing		?

Malaysian general election, 1974
Party	Candidate	Votes	%	∆%
On the nomination day, Pengiran Tahir Pengiran Petra won uncontested.
BN	Pengiran Tahir Pengiran Petra			
Total valid votes			100.00	
Total rejected ballots				
Unreturned ballots				
Turnout				
Registered electors		14,457		
Majority				
BN gain from USNO		Swing		?

Malaysian general election, 1969
Party	Candidate	Votes	%
On the nomination day, Pengiran Tahir Pengiran Petra won uncontested.
USNO	Pengiran Tahir Pengiran Petra		
Total valid votes			100.00
Total rejected ballots			
Unreturned ballots			
Turnout			
Registered electors		15,193	
Majority			
This was a new constituency created.
