= Karim Bujang =

Malaysian politician (1953–2026)

Yang Berbahagia Datuk Karim Bujang PGDK ASDK KMN
- كريم بوجڠ

Member of the Sabah State Legislative Assembly for Bongawan
- In office 1990–2013
- Preceded by: Abdul Ghani Bidin
- Succeeded by: Mohamad Alamin

Personal details
- Born: Karim bin Bujang; 3 June 1953 Kimanis, Papar District, British North Borneo
- Died: 20 September 2026 (aged 73) Kampung Sipanggil, Putatan District, Sabah, Malaysia
- Citizenship: Malaysian
- Party: USNO (till 1996); UMNO (1996-2018); WARISAN (2018-2024); GAGASAN (since 2024)
- Other political affiliations: Barisan Nasional (1996-2018); Gabungan Rakyat Sabah (since 2024)
- Occupation: Politician

Karim bin Bujang (3 June 1953 – 20 September 2026) was a Malaysian politician from GAGASAN. He was the Member of Sabah State Legislative Assembly for Bongawan from 1990 to 2013 and was formerly a Chairman of WARISAN.

== Career ==
Bujang was a member of USNO before it merged with BERJAYA to form UMNO Sabah in 1991. He had held the post of Secretary-general of Barisan Nasional Sabah. In 2018, he joined WARISAN and contested the Kimanis federal seat and 2020 Kimanis by-election.

On 17 March 2024, Karim Bujang had left WARISAN to join Parti Gagasan Rakyat Sabah (GAGASAN). Karim submitted his membership application form to Chief Minister Datuk Seri Hajiji Noor, who is also Gagasan Rakyat President, during a breaking-of-fast event, at Sabah International Convention Centre (SICC), here, Sunday.

== Death ==
Bujang died on 20 September 2026, at the age of 73.

== Election results ==
Parliament of Malaysia
Year	Constituency	Candidate	Votes	Pct.	Opponent(s)	Votes	Pct.	Ballots cast	Majority	Turnout
2018	P176 Kimanis	Karim Bujang (WARISAN)	11,786	46.19%	Anifah Aman (UMNO)	11,942	46.80%	25,519	156	86.16%
2018	P176 Kimanis	Karim Bujang (WARISAN)	11,786	46.19%	Jaafar Ismail (PHRS)	1,300	5.09%	25,519	156	86.16%
2020	P176 Kimanis	Karim Bujang (WARISAN)	10,677	45.04%	Mohamad Alamin (UMNO)	12,706	53.59%	23,708	2,091	79.92%

Sabah State Legislative Assembly
Year	Constituency	Candidate	Votes	Pct.	Opponent(s)	Votes	Pct.	Ballots cast	Majority	Turnout
1990	N34 Bongawan	Karim Bujang (USNO)	3,631	45.89%	Abdul Ghani Bidin (PBS)	3,504	44.29%	7,912	127	80.06%
1990	N34 Bongawan	Karim Bujang (USNO)	3,631	45.89%	Ibrahim Kalali (BERJAYA)	328	4.15%	7,912	127	80.06%
1990	N34 Bongawan	Karim Bujang (USNO)	3,631	45.89%	Sukaimi Suradi (PRS)	194	2.45%	7,912	127	80.06%
1990	N34 Bongawan	Karim Bujang (USNO)	3,631	45.89%	Yusoff Mohd Said (AKAR)	169	2.14%	7,912	127	80.06%
1994	N34 Bongawan	Karim Bujang (UMNO)	5,498	58.17%	Narawi Ahmad @ Sinar (PBS)	3,596	38.05%	9,451	1,902	79.63%
1994	N34 Bongawan	Karim Bujang (UMNO)	5,498	58.17%	Ajmain Abdul Gani (IND)	276	2.92%	9,451	1,902	79.63%
1999	N20 Bongawan	Karim Bujang (UMNO)	6,087	57.94%	Awang Tengah Awang Amin (PBS)	3,765	35.84%	10,505	2,292	76.91%
1999	N20 Bongawan	Karim Bujang (UMNO)	6,087	57.94%	Ajmain Abdul Gani (IND)	343	3.27%	10,505	2,292	76.91%
1999	N20 Bongawan	Karim Bujang (UMNO)	6,087	57.94%	Dzulkifli Abdul Hamid (BERSEKUTU)	163	1.55%	10,505	2,292	76.91%
1999	N20 Bongawan	Karim Bujang (UMNO)	6,087	57.94%	Abdul Karim Abdul Ghani (SETIA)	54	0.51%	10,505	2,292	76.91%
2004	N23 Bongawan	Karim Bujang (UMNO)	4,444	52.39%	Mohd Haris Mohd Tahir (IND)	3,639	42.90%	8,483	805	70.03%
2008	N23 Bongawan	Karim Bujang (UMNO)	7,123	73.35%	Mohd Haris Mohd Tahir (IND)	1,393	14.34%	9,711	5,730	78.38%
2008	N23 Bongawan	Karim Bujang (UMNO)	7,123	73.35%	Ag Wasli Ag Yahya (PKR)	875	9.01%	9,711	5,730	78.38%
2008	N23 Bongawan	Karim Bujang (UMNO)	7,123	73.35%	Lusin Balangon (BERSEKUTU)	97	1.00%	9,711	5,730	78.38%

== Honours ==
- Malaysia
  - Officer of the Order of the Defender of the Realm (KMN) (1995)
- Sabah
  - Commander of the Order of Kinabalu (PGDK) – Datuk (1995)
  - Companion of the Order of Kinabalu (ASDK) (1994)
