= Mohamad Alamin =

Malaysian politician

Yang Berhormat Datuk Mohamad Alamin PGDK JP MP
- محمد بن الأمين
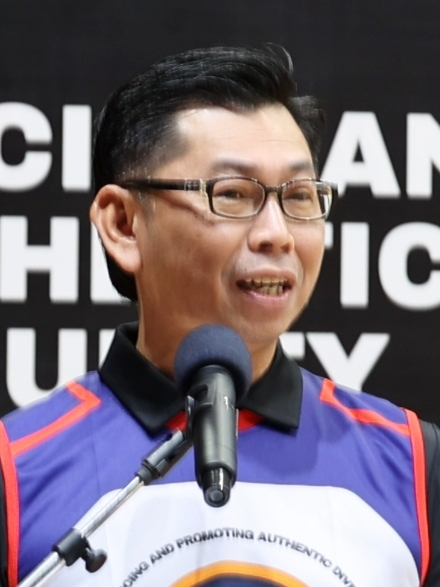
- Mohamad in 2023

Deputy Minister of Entrepreneur and Cooperatives Development
- Incumbent
- Assumed office 17 December 2025
- Monarch: Ibrahim Iskandar
- Prime Minister: Anwar Ibrahim
- Minister: Steven Sim Chee Keong
- Preceded by: Ramanan Ramakrishnan
- Constituency: Kimanis

Deputy Minister of Foreign Affairs
- In office 10 December 2022 – 17 December 2025
- Monarchs: Abdullah (2022–2024); Ibrahim Iskandar (since 2024)
- Prime Minister: Anwar Ibrahim
- Minister: Zambry Abdul Kadir (2022–2023); Mohamad Hasan (since 2023)
- Preceded by: Kamaruddin Jaffar
- Succeeded by: Lukanisman Awang Sauni
- Constituency: Kimanis

Deputy Minister of Education II
- In office 11 September 2021 – 24 November 2022
- Monarch: Abdullah
- Prime Minister: Ismail Sabri Yaakob
- Minister: Radzi Jidin
- Preceded by: Muslimin Yahaya
- Succeeded by: Lim Hui Ying (Deputy Minister of Education)
- Constituency: Kimanis

Member of the Malaysian Parliament for Kimanis
- Incumbent
- Assumed office 18 January 2020
- Preceded by: Anifah Aman (BN–UMNO)
- Majority: 2,029 (2020); 3,307 (2022)

Member of the Sabah State Legislative Assembly for Bongawan
- In office 5 May 2013 – 9 May 2018
- Preceded by: Karim Bujang (BN–UMNO)
- Succeeded by: Daud Yusof (WARISAN)
- Majority: 3,392 (2013)

Chairman of the Intellectual Property Corporation of Malaysia
- In office 1 May 2020 – 15 March 2022
- Minister: Radzi Jidin
- Director General: Mohd Roslan Mahayudin
- Preceded by: Rozhan Othman
- Succeeded by: Razali Ibrahim

Faction represented in Dewan Rakyat
- 2020–: Barisan Nasional

Faction represented in Sabah State Legislative Assembly
- 2013–2018: Barisan Nasional

Personal details
- Born: Mohamad bin Alamin; 23 November 1972 (age 53) Kg. Kelautan, Batu Enam Kimanis, Papar, Sabah, Malaysia
- Citizenship: Malaysian
- Party: United Malays National Organisation (UMNO)
- Other political affiliations: Barisan Nasional (BN)
- Education: International Islamic University of Malaysia (IIUM)
- Occupation: Politician
- Profession: Lawyer

Mohamad bin Alamin (Jawi: داتوق محمد بن حج الأمين) is a Malaysian politician and lawyer who has served as the Deputy Minister of Foreign Affairs in the Unity Government administration under Prime Minister Anwar Ibrahim as well as Ministers Zambry Abdul Kadir and Mohamad Hasan since December 2022 and the Member of Parliament (MP) for Kimanis since January 2020. He served as the Deputy Minister of Education II in the Barisan Nasional (BN) administration under former Prime Minister Ismail Sabri Yaakob and former Minister Radzi Jidin from September 2021 to the collapse of the BN administration in November 2022 and Chairman of the Intellectual Property Corporation of Malaysia (MyIPO) from May 2020 to March 2022. He is a member of the United Malays National Organisation (UMNO), a component party of the BN coalition.

== Personal life ==
Mohamad was born in Kg. Kelatuan, Batu Enam Kimanis, Papar, Sabah. His father, Haji Alamin Abdullah is an ethnic Kadazandusun from Kg. Kelatuan, Kimanis, Papar with distant Tambunan ancestral roots whilst his mother, Hajjah Juliah Saman is an ethnic Brunei Malay from Kg. Brunei, Membakut, Beaufort.

== Education ==
He received his primary education at Kelatuan Primary School in Kimanis, Papar. He then continued his studies at Toh Puan Hajjah Rahmah Religious Secondary School in Kinarut, Papar.

After graduating from secondary school, he obtained a Law Degree from the International Islamic University of Malaysia.

== Career ==
In 1997, he was accepted as an advocate & solicitor of the Sabah & Sarawak High Court.

== Political career ==
Mohamad has held various positions throughout his political career such as President of Sabahan Affairs Council, Youth Chief of UMNO Kimanis (2004–2013), and Vice Leader of UMNO Kimanis (2013–2018). He is currently the division leader of UMNO Kimanis.

In 2013 general election, Mohamad contested for Bongawan state assembly seat for the first time. He won the seat by majority of 3,392 votes.

He contested again in 2018 general election to retain the same seat. However, he was defeated by WARISAN candidate, Daud Yusof who was appointed as State Assistant Minister.

=== 2020 Kimanis by-election ===
In January 2020, Mohamad first contested to become an MP in Kimanis by-election. The election was held after the seat was declared vacant after the Federal Court on 2 December 2019 upheld the Election Court's ruling earlier on 16 August, nullifying the sitting Member of Parliament (MP), Anifah Aman's victory in the 2018 general election (GE14). BN decided to field Mohamad Alamin as their candidate for the by-election.

He won the by-election after defeating Karim Bujang from Sabah Heritage Party (WARISAN), by majority 2,029 votes.

== Election results ==
Sabah State Legislative Assembly
| Year | Constituency | Candidate | Votes | Pct | Opponent(s) | Votes | Pct | Ballots cast | Majority | Turnout |
|---|---|---|---|---|---|---|---|---|---|---|
| 2013 | N23 Bongawan | Mohamad Alamin (UMNO) | 7,443 | 59.05% | Ibrahim Menudin (PKR) | 4,051 | 32.14% | 12,866 | 3,392 | 86.80% |
| 2013 | N23 Bongawan | Mohamad Alamin (UMNO) | 7,443 | 59.05% | Ak Aliuddin Pg Mohd Tahir (IND) | 455 | 3.60% | 12,866 | 3,392 | 86.80% |
| 2013 | N23 Bongawan | Mohamad Alamin (UMNO) | 7,443 | 59.05% | Awang Talip Awang Bagul (SAPP) | 335 | 2.66% | 12,866 | 3,392 | 86.80% |
| 2013 | N23 Bongawan | Mohamad Alamin (UMNO) | 7,443 | 59.05% | Assim @ Hassim Matali (STAR) | 321 | 2.55% | 12,866 | 3,392 | 86.80% |
| 2018 | N23 Bongawan | Mohamad Alamin (UMNO) | 6,117 | 44.79% | Daud Yusof (WARISAN) | 6,912 | 50.62% | 13,953 | 795 | 85.90% |
| 2018 | N23 Bongawan | Mohamad Alamin (UMNO) | 6,117 | 44.79% | Jaafar Ismail (PHRS) | 627 | 4.59% | 13,953 | 795 | 85.90% |

Parliament of Malaysia
| Year | Constituency | Candidate | Votes | Pct | Opponent(s) | Votes | Pct | Ballots cast | Majority | Turnout |
|---|---|---|---|---|---|---|---|---|---|---|
| 2020 | P176 Kimanis | Mohamad Alamin (UMNO) | 12,706 | 54.34% | Karim Bujang (WARISAN) | 10,677 | 45.66% | 23,703 | 2,029 | 79.92% |
| 2022 | P176 Kimanis | Mohamad Alamin (UMNO) | 13,004 | 41.86% | Daud Yusof (WARISAN) | 9,967 | 32.08% | 31,068 | 3,037 | 76.22% |
| 2022 | P176 Kimanis | Mohamad Alamin (UMNO) | 13,004 | 41.86% | Amat Md Yusof (KDM) | 4,013 | 12.92% | 31,068 | 3,037 | 76.22% |
| 2022 | P176 Kimanis | Mohamad Alamin (UMNO) | 13,004 | 41.86% | Rowindy Lawrence Odong (UPKO) | 3,931 | 12.65% | 31,068 | 3,037 | 76.22% |
| 2022 | P176 Kimanis | Mohamad Alamin (UMNO) | 13,004 | 41.86% | Yusop Osman (PEJUANG) | 153 | 0.49% | 31,068 | 3,037 | 76.22% |

== Honours ==
- Malaysia
  - Recipient of the 17th Yang di-Pertuan Agong Installation Medal (2024)
- Sabah
  - Commander of the Order of Kinabalu (PGDK) – Datuk (2016)
  - Grand Star of the Order of Kinabalu (BSK) (2005)
  - Justice of the Peace (JP) (2011)
