= 1987 Bongawan by-election =

Election in Malaysia

- 19 September 1987

Bongawan seat in the Sabah State Legislative Assembly
	PBS	USNO
Candidate	Abdul Ghani Bidin	Ak Aliuddin Pg Mohd Tahir
Party	PBS	USNO
Alliance	BN	BN
Popular vote	3,279	2,835
Percentage	53.63%	46.37%.
Bongawan assemblyman before election
Abdul Karim Abdul Ghani
USNO
Elected Bongawan assemblyman
Abdul Ghani Bidin
PBS

The 1987 Bongawan by-election is a by-election for the Sabah State Legislative Assembly seat of Bongawan that were held on 19 September 1987. It was called following the automatic resignation of the incumbent, Abdul Karim Abdul Ghani on 9 July 1987 after being sacked from his party.

== Background ==
Abdul Karim Abdul Ghani, from United Sabah National Organisation (USNO), were elected to the state seat of Bongawan in the 1986 Sabah state election, defeating 5 other candidates with a 151 votes majority. He were a supreme council member of USNO.

On 9 July 1987, Abdul Karim were expelled from USNO, after he was found by the party's supreme council to be guilty of breaching party's regulation. This was after he were accused of making public statements detrimental to the party. Abdul Karim were making public statements criticizing USNO and the party leader Mustapha Harun of not supporting the plan to set up United Malays National Organisation (UMNO) in Sabah. According to the Sabah Constitution at the time, a member of Sabah Legislative Assembly automatically resigned from his seat, if the member were sacked or resigned from the party that he/she represented when winning the seat. This necessitates for by-election for the seat to be held, as the seat were vacated more that 2 years before the expiry of the state assembly current term.

== Nomination and campaign ==
In their bid to retain the seat, USNO nominated Ak Aliuddin Pg Mohd Tahir, a businessman and former member of Parliament for Kimanis from 1977 to 1981, while he were representing Sabah People's United Front (BERJAYA). Aliuddin also contested the seat in the 1986 state election as an independent, losing behind Karim of USNO and George Ng of Parti Bersatu Sabah (PBS). PBS, the current governing party of Sabah, meanwhile nominated Abdul Ghani Bidin @ Gani Bidin, a company secretary, production manager and chief engineer of state-owned Sabah Cement Sdn. Bhd.

After nominations closed, it was confirmed by SPR that there will be a straight fight between PBS and USNO for the Bongawan seat. Although both parties are component parties of federal coalition Barisan Nasional (BN), they were allowed to use their own party name and logo in the state election.

== Timeline ==
The key dates are listed below.

Date	Event
	Issue of the Writ of Election
5 September 1987	Nomination Day
5-18 September 1987	Campaigning Period
	Early polling day for postal and overseas voters
19 September 1987	Polling Day

== Results ==
Sabah state by-election, 19 September 1987: Bongawan Upon the resignation of incumbent, Abdul Karim Abdul Ghani
Party	Candidate	Votes	%	∆%
PBS	Abdul Ghani Bidin	3,279	53.17	▲12.90
USNO	Pengiran Aliuddin Pengiran Tahir	2,835	45.97	▲3.33
Total valid votes		6,114	99.14	
Total rejected ballots		53	0.86	
Unreturned ballots		0	0.00	
Turnout		6,167	68.51	▼8.45
Registered electors		9,001		
Majority		444	7.20	▲4.83
PBS gain from USNO		Swing		?

=== Previous result ===
Sabah state election, 1986: Bongawan
Party	Candidate	Votes	%	∆%
USNO	Abdul Karim Abdul Ghani	2,715	42.64	▲3.73
PBS	George Ng Shee Wah	2,564	40.27	▲2.99
Independent	Ak Aliuddin Pg Mohd Tahir	689	10.82	▲10.82
BERJAYA	Andrew Mudi	149	2.34	▼16.61
Independent	Chong Ah Tan @ Chong Tuck Foong	142	2.23	▲2.23
Independent	Chua Hu Thiam	66	1.04	▲1.04
Total valid votes		6,325	99.34	
Total rejected ballots		42	0.66	
Unreturned ballots		0	0.00	
Turnout		6,367	76.96	▲2.10
Registered electors		8,273		
Majority		151	2.37	▲0.74
USNO hold		Swing		
Source(s) "KEPUTUSAN PILIHAN RAYA UMUM DEWAN UNDANGAN NEGERI SABAH BAGI TAHUN 1986".

== Aftermath ==
Observers note that USNO's defeat in Bongawan may be caused by selection of Aliuddin as a last minute candidate, against another candidate offered by the party's local branch. Supporters of sacked Karim also may boycott the by-election or supporting PBS candidate as protest against USNO's choice.
