= Anifah Aman =

Malaysian politician

Yang Berhormat Senator Tan Sri Datuk Seri Panglima Anifah Aman PSM SPDK SPMB SSAP PGDK DIMP
- حنيفة أمان
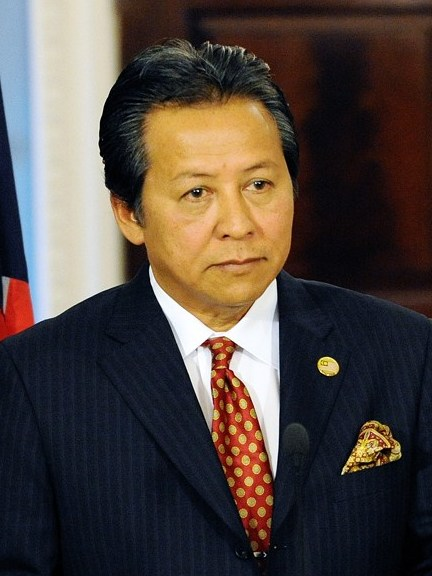
- Anifah Aman in 2009

Senator Appointed by the Yang di-Pertuan Agong

Representing Labuan
- Incumbent
- Assumed office 20 March 2023
- Monarchs: Abdullah (2023–2024); Ibrahim Iskandar (since 2024)
- Prime Minister: Anwar Ibrahim
- Preceded by: Bashir Alias

Chairman of the Labuan Corporation
- Incumbent
- Assumed office 19 June 2023
- Monarchs: Abdullah (2023–2024); Ibrahim Iskandar (since 2024)
- Prime Minister: Anwar Ibrahim
- Chief Executive Officer: Rithuan Mohd Ismail
- Preceded by: Bashir Alias

Special Advisor to the Chief Minister of Sabah on International Relations and Foreign Investments
- Incumbent
- Assumed office 30 January 2023
- Governor: Juhar Mahiruddin; Musa Aman
- Chief Minister: Hajiji Noor
- Preceded by: Position established

3rd president of the Love Sabah Party
- Incumbent
- Assumed office 26 July 2020
- Deputy: Wilfred Bumburing (2020–2024)
- Preceded by: Wilfred Bumburing

Minister of Foreign Affairs
- In office 10 April 2009 – 10 May 2018
- Monarchs: Mizan Zainal Abidin (2009–2011); Abdul Halim (2011–2016); Muhammad V (2016–2018)
- Prime Minister: Najib Razak
- Deputy: A. Kohillan Pillay (2009–2013); Lee Chee Leong (2009–2010); Richard Riot Jaem (2010–2013); Hamzah Zainudin (2013–2015); Reezal Merican Naina Merican (2015–2018)
- Preceded by: Rais Yatim
- Succeeded by: Saifuddin Abdullah
- Constituency: Kimanis

Deputy Minister of Plantation Industries and Commodities
- In office 27 March 2004 – 18 March 2008
- Monarchs: Sirajuddin (2004–2006); Mizan Zainal Abidin (2006–2008)
- Prime Minister: Abdullah Ahmad Badawi
- Minister: Peter Chin Fah Kui
- Preceded by: Himself (Deputy Minister of Primary Industries)
- Succeeded by: A. Kohillan Pillay
- Constituency: Kimanis

Deputy Minister of Primary Industries
- In office 15 December 1999 – 26 March 2004
- Monarchs: Salahuddin (1999–2001); Sirajuddin (2001–2004)
- Prime Minister: Mahathir Mohamad (1999–2003); Abdullah Ahmad Badawi (2003–2004)
- Minister: Lim Keng Yaik
- Preceded by: Hishammuddin Hussein
- Succeeded by: Himself (Deputy Minister Plantation Industries and Commodities)
- Constituency: Beaufort

Member of the Malaysian Parliament for Kimanis
- In office 21 March 2004 – 16 August 2019
- Preceded by: Nurnikman Abdullah (BN–UMNO)
- Succeeded by: Mohamad Alamin (BN–UMNO)
- Majority: 5,108 (2004); 5,453 (2008); 5,723 (2013); 156 (2018)

Member of the Malaysian Parliament for Beaufort
- In office 29 November 1999 – 21 March 2004
- Preceded by: Nurnikman Abdullah (BN–UMNO)
- Succeeded by: Azizah Mohd Dun (BN–UMNO)
- Majority: 6,800 (1999)

Faction represented in Dewan Rakyat
- 1999–2018: Barisan Nasional
- 2018–2019: Independent

Faction represented in Dewan Negara
- 2023–: Love Sabah Party

Personal details
- Born: Anifah bin Aman @ Haniff Amman; 16 November 1953 (age 72) Keningau, Crown Colony of North Borneo
- Party: United Malays National Organisation (UMNO) (member until 2018); Independent (2018–2020); Love Sabah Party (PCS) (member since 2020)
- Other political affiliations: Barisan Nasional (BN) (member until 2018); Sabah Native Cooperation Party (PKAN) (allied since 2019); Gabungan Rakyat Sabah (GRS) (member since 2024; allied 2021–2024)
- Spouse: Siti Rubiah Abdul Samad
- Relations: Musa Aman (elder brother); Annuar Ayub (nephew); Yamani Hafez Musa (nephew)
- Children: 4
- Education: University College of Buckingham
- Occupation: Politician

Anifah bin Aman (Jawi: حنيفة بن أمان @ حنيف أمان; born 16 November 1953) is a Malaysian politician who has served as senator since March 2023, chairman of the Labuan Corporation since June 2023, special advisor to the chief minister of Sabah Hajiji Noor on International Relations and Foreign Investments since January 2023 and the 3rd president of the Love Sabah Party (PCS) since July 2020. He served as the minister of foreign affairs and deputy minister of primary industries in the Barisan Nasional (BN) administration under former prime ministers Mahathir Mohamad, Abdullah Ahmad Badawi and Najib Razak and former ministers Lim Keng Yaik and Peter Chin Fah Kui from December 1999 to the collapse of the BN administration in May 2018 as well as the Member of Parliament (MP) for Beaufort from November 1999 to March 2004 and for Kimanis from March 2004 to August 2019. He is a member of the PCS and was a member of the United Malays National Organisation (UMNO), a component party of the BN coalition before leaving it to be an independent in September 2018 and joining PCS in 2020. He is also the younger half brother of Musa Aman, the Yang di-Pertua Negeri of Sabah and former chief minister of Sabah.

== Personal life ==
Anifah is married to Siti Rubiah Abdul Samad and has three sons. He is the younger brother of former chief minister of Sabah, Musa Aman. His nephew, Yamani Hafez Musa who is Musa's son; was the MP for Sipitang (2018–2022).

== Political career ==
Anifah was first elected to Parliament in the 1999 general election, winning the seat of Beaufort. He was immediately appointed deputy minister of primary industries in the government of Mahathir Mohamad. He shifted to, and won, the seat of Kimanis in the 2004 general election and became deputy minister for plantation industries and commodities. After winning re-election in the 2008 general election, Prime Minister Abdullah Ahmad Badawi appointed him as deputy transport minister. However, Anifah refused, saying he felt it was "time to make way" for someone else. Reports indicated this was the first time anyone had refused an appointment as deputy minister after the appointment had already been made public. A day later, the New Straits Times reported that Anifah and another proposed deputy minister, Tengku Azlan Abu Bakar, had "thrown a tantrum ... claiming they are 'senior enough' to be made full ministers". Abdullah reportedly told them that he had "picked the best people", leading to their resignations.

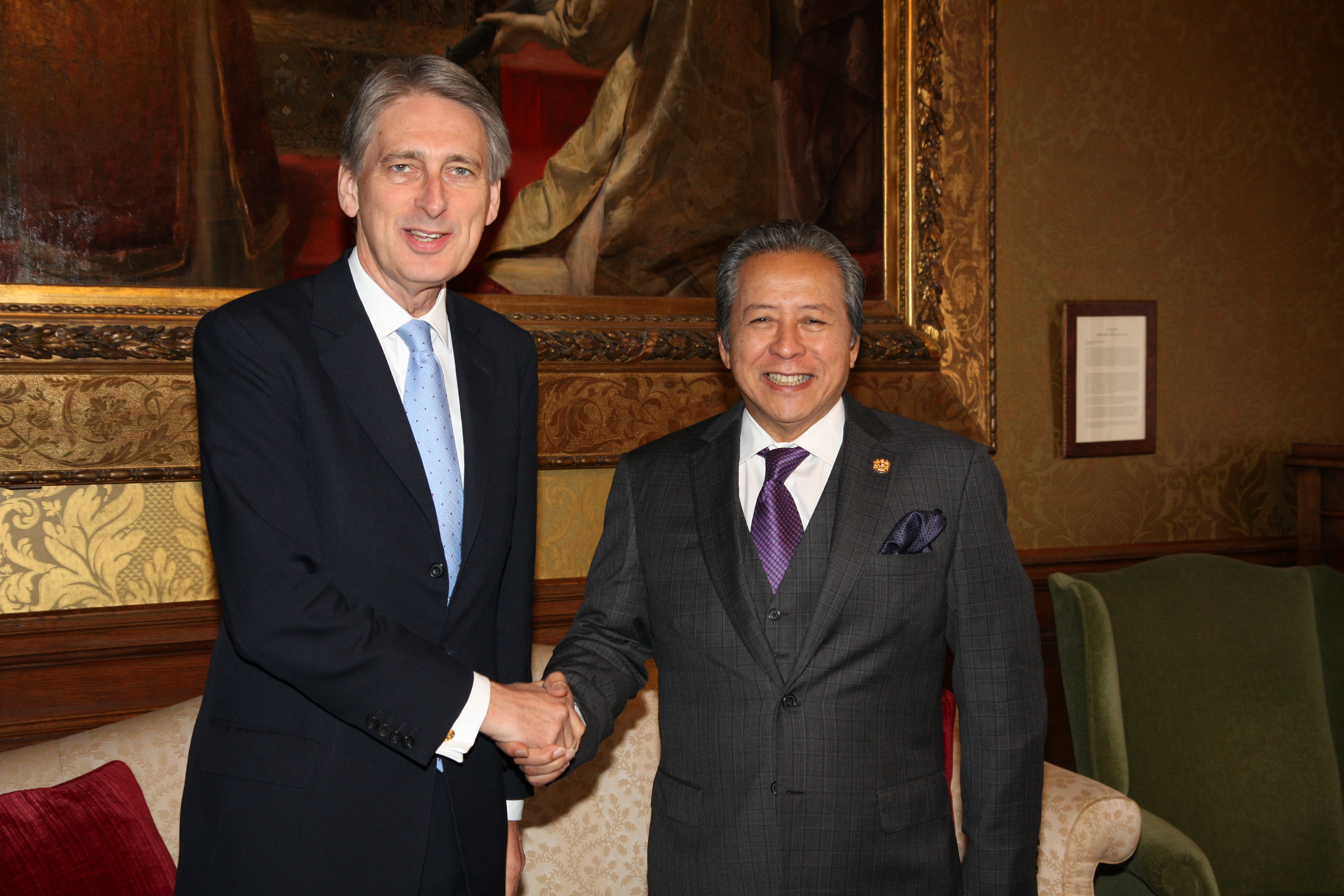
Anifah meets with British foreign secretary Philip Hammond in London on 9 December 2014.

After Najib Razak replaced Abdullah as prime minister in 2009, Anifah was promoted from the backbench to the Cabinet as minister for foreign affairs. During Anifah's tenure as foreign minister, Malaysia won election as a non-permanent member of the United Nations Security Council for the 2015–2016 term.

Amid retaining his Kimanis seat for the fourth consecutive term in the 2018 general election (GE14) which saw the downfall of BN's federal and state governments, Anifah announced his resignation from UMNO to be an independent MP in September 2018. On 16 August 2019, the Malaysian Election Court however has voided his win in the GE14 after the court found serious discrepancies in the conduct of the election process by the Election Commission (EC). He decided not to contest the 2020 Kimanis by-election called to focus on the subsequent 15th General Election instead.

In March 2020, a new opposition front with Anifah Aman as the president had been planned for the merger of Parti Gagasan Rakyat Sabah (PGRS), Love Sabah Party (PCS), Parti Kerjasama Anak Negeri (Anak Negeri) and yet-to-be registered Parti Hak Sabah. However the plan fizzles out after Anifah had joined and was elected as PCS president instead in July 2020. He had become the new PCS president after winning the post uncontested during the party 2nd Biennial General Meeting (BGM) on 26 July 2020.

=== Special advisor to the chief minister of Sabah on international relations and foreign investments (since 2023) ===
On 30 January 2023, Chief Minister of Sabah Hajiji Noor appointed Anifah to a newly created position of the special advisor to the chief minister of Sabah on international relations and foreign investments. Hajiji explained that he was confident of the extensive experience of Anifah in international relations that would assist the state government to forge good ties with foreign countries and investors and the appointment would argur well with the investor-friendly policy of Sabah. In response, Anifah thanked Hajiji for his confidence, gave assurance to do his best in the role, expressed his intention to establish Sabah as an investor-friendly destination, praised Hajiji of being visionary and highlighted the importance of international relations in bringing foreign investments to Sabah.

=== Senator (since 2023) ===
On 20 March 2023, Anifah was appointed to the Parliament as a senator.

=== Chairman of the Labuan Corporation (since 2023) ===
On 25 June 2023, Anifah was declared the new chairman of the Labuan Corporation to replace Bashir Alias. His two-year term began on 19 June 2023 and was set to end on 18 June 2025.

== Election results ==
Parliament of Malaysia
Year	Constituency	Candidate	Votes	Pct	Opponent(s)	Votes	Pct	Ballots cast	Majority	Turnout
1999	P154 Beaufort	Anifah Aman (UMNO)	16,009	63.48%	Ak Aliuddin Pg (PBS)	9,209	36.52%	25,707	6,800	64.26%
2004	P176 Kimanis	Anifah Aman (UMNO)	9,655	67.98%	Awang Tengah Awang Amin (PKR)	4,547	32.02%	15,126	5,108	70.11%
2008	P176 Kimanis	Anifah Aman (UMNO)	10,242	60.78%	Jaafar Ismail (IND)	4,789	28.42%	17,367	5,453	78.09%
2008	P176 Kimanis	Anifah Aman (UMNO)	10,242	60.78%	Ismail Bongsu (PKR)	1,615	9.58%	17,367	5,453	78.09%
2008	P176 Kimanis	Anifah Aman (UMNO)	10,242	60.78%	Benjamin Basintal (IND)	205	1.22%	17,367	5,453	78.09%
2013	P176 Kimanis	Anifah Aman (UMNO)	13,754	60.66%	Jaafar Ismail (PKR)	8,031	35.42%	23,170	5,723	87.01%
2013	P176 Kimanis	Anifah Aman (UMNO)	13,754	60.66%	Jamil William Core (SAPP)	650	2.87%	23,170	5,723	87.01%
2013	P176 Kimanis	Anifah Aman (UMNO)	13,754	60.66%	Lusin Balangon (STAR)	240	1.06%	23,170	5,723	87.01%
2018	P176 Kimanis	Anifah Aman (UMNO)	11,942	47.71%	Karim Bujang (WARISAN)	11,786	47.09%	25,519	156	86.16%
2018	P176 Kimanis	Anifah Aman (UMNO)	11,942	47.71%	Jaafar Ismail (PHRS)	1,300	5.09%	25,519	156	86.16%

Sabah State Legislative Assembly
Year	Constituency	Candidate	Votes	Pct	Opponent(s)	Votes	Pct	Ballots cast	Majority	Turnout
1994	N36 Klias	Anifah Aman (UMNO)	4,476	47.36%	Lajim Ukin (PBS)	4,881	49.09%	9,468	405	78.68%
2020	N30 Bongawan	Anifah Aman (PCS)	3,598	28.16%	Daud Yusof (WARISAN)	5,400	42.26%	12,778	1,802	76.35%
2020	N30 Bongawan	Anifah Aman (PCS)	3,598	28.16%	Ag Lahap Ag Bakar @ Ag Syairin (UMNO)	3,548	27.76%	12,778	1,802	76.35%
2020	N30 Bongawan	Anifah Aman (PCS)	3,598	28.16%	Mohd Azree Abd Ghani (LDP)	232	1.82%	12,778	1,802	76.35%

== Honours ==
=== Honours of Malaysia ===
- Malaysia
  - Commander of the Order of Loyalty to the Crown of Malaysia (PSM) – Tan Sri (2023)
  - Recipient of the 17th Yang di-Pertuan Agong Installation Medal
- Pahang
  - Knight Companion of the Order of the Crown of Pahang (DIMP) – Dato' (2004)
  - Grand Knight of the Order of Sultan Ahmad Shah of Pahang (SSAP) – Dato' Sri (2009)
- Sabah
  - Commander of the Order of Kinabalu (PGDK) – Datuk (1998)
  - Grand Commander of the Order of Kinabalu (SPDK) – Datuk Seri Panglima (2011)

=== Foreign honours ===
- Brunei
  - Grand Commander of the Order of the Crown of Brunei (SPMB) – Dato Seri Paduka (14 August 2014)

== See also ==
- List of foreign ministers in 2017
