= Daud Yusof =

Malaysian politician (born 1961)

Yang Berhormat Tuan Dr. Daud Yusof ASDK MLA
- داود يوسف

State Assistant Minister of Agriculture and Food Industries of Sabah
- In office 16 May 2018 – 29 September 2020
- Minister: Junz Wong Hong Jun
- Governor: Juhar Mahiruddin
- Chief Minister: Shafie Apdal
- Preceded by: Sairin Karno & Musbah Jamli
- Succeeded by: James Ratib & Hendrus Anding
- Constituency: Bongawan

Member of the Sabah State Legislative Assembly for Bongawan
- Incumbent
- Assumed office 9 May 2018
- Preceded by: Mohamad Alamin (BN–UMNO)
- Majority: 795 (2018); 1,802 (2020); 938 (2025)

Vice President of the Heritage Party (Appointed)
- Incumbent
- Assumed office 26 May 2023 Serving with: Jaujan Sambakong &; Junz Wong Hong Jun &; Terrence Siambun
- President: Shafie Apdal

Faction represented in the Sabah State Legislative Assembly
- 2018–: Heritage Party

Personal details
- Born: Daud bin Yusof; 22 January 1961 (age 65) Kimanis, Papar, Crown Colony of North Borneo (now Sabah, Malaysia)
- Party: United Malays National Organisation of Sabah (Sabah UMNO) (until 2018); Heritage Party (WARISAN) (since 2018)
- Other political affiliations: Barisan Nasional (BN) (until 2018)
- Parent(s): Yusof Matarsad & Mariam Omar
- Education: Institut Pertanian Bogor
- Occupation: Politician

Daud bin Yusof (born 22 January 1961) is a Malaysian politician who served as the State Assistant Minister of Agriculture and Food Industries of Sabah in the Heritage Party (WARISAN) state administration under Chief Minister Shafie Apdal and former Minister Junz Wong Hong Jun from May 2018 to the collapse of the WARISAN state administration in September 2020, as well as a Member of the Sabah State Legislative Assembly (MLA) for Bongawan since May 2018.

== Election results ==
Sabah State Legislative Assembly
Year	Constituency	Candidate	Votes	Pct	Opponent(s)	Votes	Pct	Ballots cast	Majority	Turnout
2018	N23 Bongawan	Daud Yusof (WARISAN)	6,912	50.62%	Mohamad Alamin (Sabah UMNO)	6,117	44.79%	13,953	795	85.90%
2018	N23 Bongawan	Daud Yusof (WARISAN)	6,912	50.62%	Jaafar Ismail (PHRS)	627	4.59%	13,953	795	85.90%
2020	N30 Bongawan	Daud Yusof (WARISAN)	5,400	42.26%	Anifah Aman (PCS)	3,598	28.16%	12,778	1,802	76.35%
2020	N30 Bongawan	Daud Yusof (WARISAN)	5,400	42.26%	Ag Lahap Ag Bakar @ Ag Syairin (Sabah UMNO)	3,548	27.76%	12,778	1,802	76.35%
2020	N30 Bongawan	Daud Yusof (WARISAN)	5,400	42.26%	Mohd Azree Abd Ghani (LDP)	232	1.82%	12,778	1,802	76.35%
2025	N30 Bongawan	Daud Yusof (WARISAN)	5,542	30.70%	Anifah Aman (PCS)	4,604	25.50%	18,340	938	76.40%
2025	N30 Bongawan	Daud Yusof (WARISAN)	5,542	30.70%	Mohamad Alamin (Sabah UMNO)	4,569	25.31%	18,340	938	76.40%
2025	N30 Bongawan	Daud Yusof (WARISAN)	5,542	30.70%	Peter Matinjal (KDM)	1,868	10.35%	18,340	938	76.40%
2025	N30 Bongawan	Daud Yusof (WARISAN)	5,542	30.70%	Dolores Michael (STAR)	801	4.44%	18,340	938	76.40%
2025	N30 Bongawan	Daud Yusof (WARISAN)	5,542	30.70%	Ridzuan Firdaus (Sabah BERSATU)	465	2.58%	18,340	938	76.40%
2025	N30 Bongawan	Daud Yusof (WARISAN)	5,542	30.70%	Md Haris Md Tahir (IND)	86	0.48%	18,340	938	76.40%
2025	N30 Bongawan	Daud Yusof (WARISAN)	5,542	30.70%	Royston Adven (IMPIAN)	76	0.42%	18,340	938	76.40%
2025	N30 Bongawan	Daud Yusof (WARISAN)	5,542	30.70%	Hussin Dasar @ Esah (PPRS)	43	0.24%	18,340	938	76.40%

== Honours ==
- Sabah
  - Companion of the Order of Kinabalu (ASDK) (2018)
