= Jaujan Sambakong =

Malaysian politician (born 1958)

Yang Berhormat Datuk Jaujan Sambakong DIMP PGDK ASDK MLA
- جاوجان سمباكوڠ

Deputy Chief Minister of Sabah II
- In office 16 May 2018 – 29 September 2020 Serving with: Wilfred Madius Tangau (Deputy Chief Minister I) &; Christina Liew Chin Jin (Deputy Chief Minister III)
- Governor: Juhar Mahiruddin
- Chief Minister: Shafie Apdal
- Preceded by: Jeffrey Kitingan
- Succeeded by: Jeffrey Kitingan
- Constituency: Sulabayan

State Minister of Housing and Local Government of Sabah
- In office 16 May 2018 – 29 September 2020
- Governor: Juhar Mahiruddin
- Chief Minister: Shafie Apdal
- Assistant: George Hiew Vun Zin
- Preceded by: Jahid Jahim
- Succeeded by: Masidi Manjun
- Constituency: Sulabayan

Member of the Sabah State Legislative Assembly for Sulabayan
- Incumbent
- Assumed office 5 May 2013
- Preceded by: Harman Mohamad (BN–UMNO)
- Majority: 5,129 (2013); 4,926 (2018); 3,245 (2020); 5,913 (2025)

Vice President of the Heritage Party
- Incumbent
- Assumed office 17 October 2016 Serving with: Junz Wong Hong Jun &; Peter Anthony (until 2021) &; Terrence Siambun (since 2022) &; Daud Yusof (Appointed, since 2023)
- President: Shafie Apdal

Faction represented in Sabah State Legislative Assembly
- 2013–2016: Barisan Nasional
- 2016–: Heritage Party

Personal details
- Born: Jaujan bin Sambakong; 18 October 1958 (age 67) Semporna, Crown Colony of North Borneo (now Sabah, Malaysia)
- Party: United Malays National Organisation of Sabah (Sabah UMNO) (1995–2016); Heritage Party (WARISAN) (since 2016)
- Other political affiliations: Barisan Nasional (BN) (1995–2016)
- Spouse: Rohaya Mansor
- Occupation: Politician

Jaujan bin Sambakong is a Malaysian politician who served as the Deputy Chief Minister of Sabah II and State Minister of Housing and Local Government of Sabah in the Heritage Party (WARISAN) state administration under former Chief Minister Shafie Apdal from May 2018 to the collapse of the WARISAN state administration in September 2020, as well as Member of Sabah State Legislative Assembly (MLA) for Sulabayan since May 2013. He is a member of WARISAN and formerly a member of the United Malays National Organisation of Sabah (Sabah UMNO), a branch of a component party of the Barisan Nasional (BN) coalition.

== Election results ==
Sabah State Legislative Assembly
Year	Constituency	Candidate	Votes	Pct	Opponent(s)	Votes	Pct	Ballots cast	Majority	Turnout
2013	N52 Sulabayan	Jaujan Sambakong (Sabah UMNO)	6,546	73.44%	Hermeny Murgal (PKR)	1,417	15.89%	9,413	5,129	74.80%
2013	N52 Sulabayan	Jaujan Sambakong (Sabah UMNO)	6,546	73.44%	Hussein Mumakil (IND)	347	3.89%	9,413	5,129	74.80%
2013	N52 Sulabayan	Jaujan Sambakong (Sabah UMNO)	6,546	73.44%	Hasaman Sagaran (MUPP)	227	2.55%	9,413	5,129	74.80%
2013	N52 Sulabayan	Jaujan Sambakong (Sabah UMNO)	6,546	73.44%	Ghazalie Pg. Hindi (IND)	196	2.20%	9,413	5,129	74.80%
2013	N52 Sulabayan	Jaujan Sambakong (Sabah UMNO)	6,546	73.44%	Julkalani Abd. Rahman (IND)	107	1.20%	9,413	5,129	74.80%
2013	N52 Sulabayan	Jaujan Sambakong (Sabah UMNO)	6,546	73.44%	Mamat Barhana (IND)	74	0.83%	9,413	5,129	74.80%
2018	N52 Sulabayan	Jaujan Sambakong (WARISAN)	7,116	74.91%	Harman Mohamad (Sabah UMNO)	2,190	23.06%	9,868	4,926	70.60%
2018	N52 Sulabayan	Jaujan Sambakong (WARISAN)	7,116	74.91%	Abdul Nasir Ab Raup (PAS)	139	1.46%	9,868	4,926	70.60%
2018	N52 Sulabayan	Jaujan Sambakong (WARISAN)	7,116	74.91%	Untung Tanjong Baru (PHRS)	54	0.57%	9,868	4,926	70.60%
2020	N64 Sulabayan	Jaujan Sambakong (WARISAN)	5,747	69.04%	Abdul Manan Indanan (Sabah UMNO)	2,502	30.06%	8,324	3,245	59.41%
2020	N64 Sulabayan	Jaujan Sambakong (WARISAN)	5,747	69.04%	Alahuddin Mohd. Sarah (PCS)	75	0.90%	8,324	3,245	59.41%
2025	N64 Sulabayan	Jaujan Sambakong (WARISAN)	7,318	74.40%	Zulfikar Ab Mijan (AMANAH)	1,405	14.34%	10,015	5,913	49.52%
2025	N64 Sulabayan	Jaujan Sambakong (WARISAN)	7,318	74.40%	Bidin Jawa (STAR)	357	3.64%	10,015	5,913	49.52%
2025	N64 Sulabayan	Jaujan Sambakong (WARISAN)	7,318	74.40%	Abdul Malik Abd Bool (PAS)	231	2.36%	10,015	5,913	49.52%
2025	N64 Sulabayan	Jaujan Sambakong (WARISAN)	7,318	74.40%	Abdillah Abdul Hamid (IND)	223	2.28%	10,015	5,913	49.52%
2025	N64 Sulabayan	Jaujan Sambakong (WARISAN)	7,318	74.40%	Mat Roya @ Abdul Mutalib Jaafar (IMPIAN)	137	1.40%	10,015	5,913	49.52%
2025	N64 Sulabayan	Jaujan Sambakong (WARISAN)	7,318	74.40%	Hasman Sagaran (ANAK NEGERI)	82	0.84%	10,015	5,913	49.52%
2025	N64 Sulabayan	Jaujan Sambakong (WARISAN)	7,318	74.40%	Sumini Yasintus (PPRS)	43	0.44%	10,015	5,913	49.52%

== Honours ==
- Sabah
  - Commander of the Order of Kinabalu (PGDK) – Datuk (2018)
  - Companion of the Order of Kinabalu (ASDK) (2002)
- Pahang
  - Knight Companion of the Order of the Crown of Pahang (DIMP) – Dato' (2009)
