= Sulabayan =

Sulabayan (N64)
Sabah constituency

State constituency
- Legislature: Sabah State Legislative Assembly
MLA
Jaujan Sambakong
Heritage
- Constituency created: 1984
- First contested: 1986
- Last contested: 2025

Demographics
- Electors (2025): 20,258

Sulabayan is a state constituency in Sabah, Malaysia, that is represented in the Sabah State Legislative Assembly.

== Demographics ==
As of 2020, Sulabayan has a population of 33,882 people.

Ethnic breakdown of Sulabayan's electorate as of 2025
1. Muslim Bumiputera (95.0%)
2. Non-Muslim Bumiputera (4.00%)
3. Other ethnicities (1.00%)
4. Chinese (0.00%)

== History ==
=== Polling districts ===
According to the gazette issued on 31 October 2022, the Sulabayan constituency has a total of 12 polling districts.

State constituency	Polling Districts	Code	Location
Sulabayan（N64）	Pulau	189/64/01	SK Pulau Balit
Sulabayan（N64）	Bum-Bum Utara	189/64/02	SK Balimbang
Sulabayan（N64）	Sisipan	189/64/03	SK Sisipan
Sulabayan（N64）	Bum-Bum Selatan	189/64/04	SK Pulau Bum-Bum
Sulabayan（N64）	Sulabayan	189/64/05	SK Sulabayan
Sulabayan（N64）	Denawan	189/64/06	SK Pulau Denawan
Sulabayan（N64）	Larapan	189/64/07	SK Pulau Sumandi
Sulabayan（N64）	Selakan	189/64/08	SK Selakan
Sulabayan（N64）	Terusan	189/64/09	SK Terusan Baru
Sulabayan（N64）	Hampalan	189/64/10	SK Hampalan
Sulabayan（N64）	Tongkalloh	189/64/11	SK Tongkalloh
Sulabayan（N64）	Pulau Omadal	189/64/12	SK Pulau Omadal

=== Representation history ===
Member of Sabah State Legislative Assembly for Sulabayan
Assembly	No	Years	Member	Party
Constituency created from Semporna and Kunak
7th	N48	1985 – 1986	Sakaran Dandai	USNO
8th	N48	1986 – 1990	Sakaran Dandai	USNO
9th	N48	1990	Sakaran Dandai	USNO
9th	N48	1990	Sakaran Dandai	BN (UMNO)
9th	N48	1990 – 1994	Nasir Sakaran	BN (UMNO)
10th	N48	1994	Sakaran Dandai	BN (UMNO)
10th	N48	1995 – 1999	Nasir Sakaran	BN (UMNO)
11th	N43	1999 – 2004	Mohd Lan Allani	BN (UMNO)
12th	N52	2004 – 2008	Mohd Lan Allani	BN (UMNO)
13th	N52	2008 – 2013	Harman Mohamad	BN (UMNO)
14th	N52	2013 – 2016	Jaujan Sambakong	BN (UMNO)
14th	N52	2016 – 2018	Jaujan Sambakong	WARISAN
15th	N52	2018 – 2020	Jaujan Sambakong	WARISAN
16th	N64	2020 – 2025	Jaujan Sambakong	WARISAN
17th	N64	2025–present	Jaujan Sambakong	WARISAN

== Election results ==
Sabah state election, 2025: Sulabayan
Party	Candidate	Votes	%	∆%
Heritage	Jaujan Sambakong	7,318	74.40	▲7.47
PH	Zulfikar Ab Mijan	1,405	14.34	▲14.34
Homeland Solidarity Party	Bidin Jawa	357	3.64	▲3.64
PN	Abdul Malik Abd Bool	231	2.36	▲2.36
Independent	Abdillah Abdul Hamid	223	2.28	▲2.28
Sabah Dream Party	Mat Roya @ Abdul Mutalib Jaafar	137	1.40	▲1.40
Sabah Native Cooperation Party	Hasman Sagaran	82	0.84	▲0.84
Sabah People's Unity Party	Sumini Yasintus	43	0.44	▲0.44
Total valid votes		9,796		
Total rejected ballots		219		
Unreturned ballots		17		
Turnout		10,032	49.52	▼11.76
Registered electors		20,258		
Majority		5,913	60.36	▲22.57
Heritage hold		Swing		
Source(s) "RESULTS OF CONTESTED ELECTION AND STATEMENTS OF THE POLL AFTER THE OFFICIAL ADDITION OF VOTES" (PDF).

Sabah state election, 2020: Sulabayan
Party	Candidate	Votes	%	∆%
Sabah Heritage Party	Jaujan Sambakong	5,747	66.93	▼5.18
BN	Abdul Manan Indanan	2,502	29.14	▲6.95
Love Sabah Party	Alahuddin Mohd Sarah	75	0.87	▲0.87
Total valid votes		8,324	96.94	
Total rejected ballots		182	2.12	
Unreturned ballots		81	0.94	
Turnout		8,587	61.28	▼9.29
Registered electors		14,012		
Majority		3,245	37.79	▼12.13
Sabah Heritage Party hold		Swing		
Source(s) "RESULTS OF CONTESTED ELECTION AND STATEMENTS OF THE POLL AFTER THE OFFICIAL ADDITION OF VOTES".

Sabah state election, 2018: Sulabayan
Party	Candidate	Votes	%	∆%
Sabah Heritage Party	Jaujan Sambakong	7,116	72.11	▲72.11
BN	Harman Mohamad	2,190	22.19	▼47.04
PAS	Abdul Nasir Abdul Raup	139	1.41	▲1.41
Sabah People's Hope Party	Utung Tanjong Baru	54	0.55	▲0.55
Total valid votes		9,499	96.26	
Total rejected ballots		324	3.28	
Unreturned ballots		45	0.46	
Turnout		9,868	70.57	▼4.23
Registered electors		13,984		
Majority		4,926	49.92	▼4.32
Sabah Heritage Party gain from BN		Swing		?
Source(s) "RESULTS OF CONTESTED ELECTION AND STATEMENTS OF THE POLL AFTER THE OFFICIAL ADDITION OF VOTES".

Sabah state election, 2013: Sulabayan
Party	Candidate	Votes	%	∆%
BN	Jaujan Sambakong	6,546	69.23	▲9.54
PKR	Hermeny Murgal	1,417	14.99	▼17.69
Independent	Hussein Mumakil	347	3.67	▲3.67
MUPP	Hasaman Sagaran	227	2.40	▲2.40
Independent	Ghazalie Hindi @ Abdul Ghani	196	2.07	▲2.07
Independent	Julkalani Abdul Rahman	107	1.13	▲1.13
Independent	Mamat Barhana	74	0.78	▲0.78
Total valid votes		8,914	94.27	
Total rejected ballots		499	5.28	
Unreturned ballots		43	0.45	
Turnout		9,456	74.80	▲8.02
Registered electors		12,642		
Majority		5,129	54.24	▲27.23
BN hold		Swing		
Source(s) "KEPUTUSAN PILIHAN RAYA UMUM DEWAN UNDANGAN NEGERI".

Sabah state election, 2008: Sulabayan
Party	Candidate	Votes	%	∆%
BN	Harman Mohamad	4,501	59.69	▲6.66
PKR	Mohd Abdul Wahab Abdullah	2,464	32.68	▲30.92
Total valid votes		6,965	92.37	
Total rejected ballots		389	5.16	
Unreturned ballots		186	2.47	
Turnout		7,540	66.78	▲4.33
Registered electors		11,291		
Majority		2,037	27.01	▼6.43
BN hold		Swing		
Source(s) "KEPUTUSAN PILIHAN RAYA UMUM DEWAN UNDANGAN NEGERI SABAH BAGI TAHUN 2008".

Sabah state election, 2004: Sulabayan
Party	Candidate	Votes	%	∆%
BN	Mohd Lan Allani	3,706	53.03	▼8.14
Independent	Madjalis Lais	1,369	19.59	▲19.59
Independent	Ali Mardan Indanan @ Mohd Tahir	846	12.10	▲12.10
Independent	Marinsa Amana @ Marinshah Abu Hamid	534	7.64	▲7.64
Independent	Dualali Asdurin	161	2.30	▲2.30
PKR	Juhaili Abdul Wahab	123	1.76	▲1.76
Total valid votes		6,739	96.42	
Total rejected ballots		248	3.55	
Unreturned ballots		2	0.03	
Turnout		6,989	62.45	▼6.46
Registered electors		11,192		
Majority		2,337	33.44	▲20.37
BN hold		Swing		
Source(s) "KEPUTUSAN PILIHAN RAYA UMUM DEWAN UNDANGAN NEGERI SABAH BAGI TAHUN 2004".

Sabah state election, 1999: Sulabayan
Party	Candidate	Votes	%	∆%
BN	Mohd Lan Allani	3,302	44.89	▼14.91
BERSEKUTU	Aakalani Abdul Rahim	2,340	31.82	▲29.11
PBS	Ispal Abok	785	10.67	▼23.82
Independent	Abdul Salam Maslah	662	9.00	▲9.00
Independent	Mohd Yassin Ibrahim	124	1.69	▲1.69
Total valid votes		7,213	98.07	
Total rejected ballots		142	1.93	
Unreturned ballots		0	0.00	
Turnout		7,355	68.91	▼1.68
Registered electors		10,673		
Majority		962	13.07	▼12.24
BN hold		Swing		
Source(s) "KEPUTUSAN PILIHAN RAYA UMUM DEWAN UNDANGAN NEGERI SABAH BAGI TAHUN 1999".

Sabah state election, 1994: Sulabayan
Party	Candidate	Votes	%	∆%
BN	Sakaran Dandai	7,440	59.80	▲9.91
PBS	Abdillah Abdul Hamid	4,291	34.49	▲7.83
BERSEKUTU	Abdul Rajin Mandul Hati	350	2.81	▲2.81
Independent	Kiling Tiring	65	0.52	▲0.52
Total valid votes		12,146	97.62	
Total rejected ballots		296	2.38	
Unreturned ballots		0	0.00	
Turnout		12,442	70.59	▲0.53
Registered electors		17,626		
Majority		3,149	25.31	▲2.08
BN hold		Swing		
Source(s) "KEPUTUSAN PILIHAN RAYA UMUM DEWAN UNDANGAN NEGERI SABAH BAGI TAHUN 1994".

Sabah state election, 1990: Sulabayan
Party	Candidate	Votes	%	∆%
USNO	Sakaran Dandai	4,977	49.89	▼17.39
PBS	Eranza Saribu	2,660	26.66	▼1.17
BERJAYA	Basali Tarireh	1,820	18.24	▲18.24
Independent	Abdul Razak Palah	170	1.70	▲1.70
Independent	Bakal Manduan	103	1.03	▼2.28
Total valid votes		9,730	97.53	
Total rejected ballots		246	2.47	
Unreturned ballots		0	0.00	
Turnout		9,976	70.06	▲3.26
Registered electors		14,240		
Majority		2,317	23.23	▼16.22
USNO hold		Swing		
Source(s) "KEPUTUSAN PILIHAN RAYA UMUM DEWAN UNDANGAN NEGERI SABAH BAGI TAHUN 1990".

Sabah state election, 1986: Sulabayan
Party	Candidate	Votes	%	∆%
USNO	Sakaran Dandai	5,360	67.28	▲3.07
PBS	Eranza Saribu	2,217	27.83	▲27.83
Independent	Bakal Manduan	264	3.37	▲3.37
Total valid votes		7,841		
Total rejected ballots		126		
Unreturned ballots		0		
Turnout		7,967	66.72	▼3.78
Registered electors		11,926		
Majority		3,143	40.08	▲3.31
USNO hold		Swing		
Source(s) "KEPUTUSAN PILIHAN RAYA UMUM DEWAN UNDANGAN NEGERI SABAH BAGI TAHUN 1986".

Sabah state election, 1985: Sulabayan
Party	Candidate	Votes	%
USNO	Sakaran Dandai	4,901	64.21
BERJAYA	Marasal Kk Lais	2,093	27.43
BERSIH	Osman Abdul Kadir	637	8.35
Total valid votes		7,631	
Total rejected ballots		269	
Unreturned ballots		0	
Turnout		7,900	70.50
Registered electors		11,208	
Majority		2,808	36.77
This was a new seat created.
