= Sairin Karno =

Malaysian politician

Yang Berbahagia Datuk Sairin Karno PGDK DMSM KMN
- ساءيرين كرنو

Sabah Assistant Minister of Rural Development
- In office 2008–2013
- Minister: Ewon Ebin
- Governor: Ahmadshah Abdullah (2008–2010); Juhar Mahiruddin (2011–2013)
- Chief Minister: Musa Aman

Sabah Assistant Minister of Agriculture and Food Industry
- In office 2013–2018
- Minister: Yahya Hussin
- Governor: Juhar Mahiruddin
- Chief Minister: Musa Aman

Member of the Sabah State Legislative Assembly for Liawan
- In office 2004–2018
- Preceded by: New constituency
- Succeeded by: Rasinin Kautis

Member of Dewan Negara

Appointed by the Sabah State Legislative Assembly
- In office 1993–1999

Personal details
- Born: Haji Sairin bin Haji Karno; 2 June 1954 (age 71) Kampung Bayangan, Keningau, Crown Colony of North Borneo
- Citizenship: Malaysian
- Party: United Sabah National Organisation (USNO) (till 1991); United Malays National Organisation (UMNO) (1991–2019); Malaysian United Indigenous Party (BERSATU) (2019–2022); Parti Gagasan Rakyat Sabah (GAGASAN) (2023–2025); Sabah Heritage Party (WARISAN) (since 2025)
- Other political affiliations: Barisan Nasional (1990–2019); Pakatan Harapan (2019–2020); Perikatan Nasional (2020–2022); Gabungan Rakyat Sabah (allied: 2020–2025, member: 2022–2025)
- Occupation: Politician
- Profession: Political analyst, schoolteacher

Sairin bin Karno (born 2 June 1954) is a Malaysian politician from Sabah and member of Gagasan Rakyat Sabah. He was the Member of Sabah State Legislative Assembly for Liawan, Keningau from 2004 to 2018 and a former member of the Dewan Negara representing Sabah from 1993 to 1999.

He was also a former Sabah state Assistant Minister from 2008 to 2018 and former member of the Malaysian United Indigenous Party of Sabah as well as the United Malays National Organisation of Sabah and United Sabah National Organisation parties.

== Career ==
He firstly worked as a teacher from 1976 to 1982. Besides that, he was also the Chairman of Sabah MNI Agency from 1984 to 1996, member of Board of Directors of FELCRA from 1992 to 1994, director of the People's Development Leaders Unit of Sabah from 1994 to 1996, deputy Executive Chairman of the Sabah National Integration Unit in 1996, member of the board of directors of Tabung Haji Malaysia and finally became the President of the Sabah Native Affairs Council from 1998 to 2004.

As of 2020, he is now the Chairman of the Sabah Islamic United Organization ever since he retired from politics, as a consequence of his recent defeat in the 2018 general elections.

== Politics ==
He started his political career in early 1980s and was a member of USNO. He joined UMNO after USNO was abolished. He was the Sabah Assistant Minister of Rural Development from 2008 to 2013, and Sabah Assistant Minister of Agriculture and Food Industry from 2013 to 2018. He quitted UMNO and was joined BERSATU in 2019 before joining the GAGASAN party in 2023 under the leadership of Hajiji Noor and his deputy, Masidi Manjun.

== Election results ==
Sabah State Legislative Assembly
Year	Constituency	Candidate	Votes	Pct.	Opponent(s)	Votes	Pct.	Ballots cast	Majority	Turnout
2004	N34 Liawan	Sairin Karno (UMNO)	4,709	70.71%	Lawrence Gimbang (IND)	1,405	21.10%	6,660	3,304	63.67%
2004	N34 Liawan	Sairin Karno (UMNO)	4,709	70.71%	Paul Kadau (IND)	476	7.15%	6,660	3,304	63.67%
2008	N34 Liawan	Sairin Karno (UMNO)	4,661	59.67%	Jius Awang (PKR)	2,617	33.50%	7,811	2,044	71.05%
2008	N34 Liawan	Sairin Karno (UMNO)	4,661	59.67%	Yangul Modiadau @ Lawrence Edau (DAP)	286	3.66%	7,811	2,044	71.05%
2008	N34 Liawan	Sairin Karno (UMNO)	4,661	59.67%	Yapilin Nawawi (IND)	104	1.33%	7,811	2,044	71.05%
2013	N34 Liawan	Sairin Karno (UMNO)	5,383	46.74%	Paul Bunsu Gitang (PKR)	3,631	31.52%	11,518	1,752	81.94%
2013	N34 Liawan	Sairin Karno (UMNO)	5,383	46.74%	Nicholas James Guntobon (STAR)	2,067	17.95%	11,518	1,752	81.94%
2013	N34 Liawan	Sairin Karno (UMNO)	5,383	46.74%	Pauket Yadiloh @ Jahari Tahir (SAPP)	236	2.05%	11,518	1,752	81.94%
2013	N34 Liawan	Sairin Karno (UMNO)	5,383	46.74%	Nusleh Madarak (IND)	18	0.16%	11,518	1,752	81.94%
2018	N34 Liawan	Sairin Karno (UMNO)	5,005	36.77%	Rasinin Kautis (WARISAN)	6,387	46.93%	13,610	1,382	79.31%
2018	N34 Liawan	Sairin Karno (UMNO)	5,005	36.77%	Kong Fui Seng (STAR)	1,809	13.29%	13,610	1,382	79.31%
2018	N34 Liawan	Sairin Karno (UMNO)	5,005	36.77%	Hussein Kassim @ Jaimis Madatin (PCS)	176	1.29%	13,610	1,382	79.31%

== Honours ==
- Malaysia
  - Officer of the Order of the Defender of the Realm (KMN) (1999)
  - Member of the Order of the Defender of the Realm (AMN) (1992)
- Malacca
  - Companion Class I of the Exalted Order of Malacca (DMSM) – Datuk (2002)
- Sabah
  - Commander of the Order of Kinabalu (PGDK) – Datuk (1997)
