= Rasinin Kautis =

Malaysian politician

Rasinin Kautis ASDK

State Assistant Minister of Rural Development of Sabah
- In office 16 May 2018 – 29 September 2020 Serving with Dumi Pg Masdal
- Governor: Juhar Mahiruddin
- Chief Minister: Shafie Apdal
- Minister: Ewon Benedick
- Preceded by: Nilwan Kabang
- Succeeded by: Samad Jambri
- Constituency: Liawan

Member of the Sabah State Legislative Assembly for Liawan
- In office 9 May 2018 – 26 September 2020
- Preceded by: Sairin Karno (BN–UMNO)
- Succeeded by: Annuar Ayub Aman (GRS–STAR)
- Majority: 1,382 (2018)

Personal details
- Born: Rasinin bin Kautis; 24 September 1961 (age 64) Keningau, Crown Colony of North Borneo (now Sabah, Malaysia)
- Citizenship: Malaysian
- Party: United Malays National Organisation of Sabah (Sabah UMNO) (–2018); Heritage Party (WARISAN) (since 2018)
- Other political affiliations: Barisan Nasional (BN) (−2018)
- Occupation: Politician

Rasinin bin Kautis (born 24 September 1961) is a Malaysian politician who served as the State Assistant Minister of Rural Development of Sabah in the Heritage Party (WARISAN) state administration under former Chief Minister Shafie Apdal and former Minister Ewon Benedick from May 2018 to the collapse of the WARISAN state administration in September 2020 and Member of the Sabah State Legislative Assembly (MLA) for Liawan from May 2018 to September 2020. He is a member of WARISAN and was a member of the United Malays National Organisation of Sabah (Sabah UMNO), a component party of the Barisan Nasional (BN) coalition.

== Election results ==
Parliament of Malaysia
Year	Constituency	Candidate	Votes	Pct	Opponent(s)	Votes	Pct	Ballots cast	Majority	Turnout
2022	P180 Keningau	Rasinin Kautis (WARISAN)	7,020	12.79%	Jeffrey Kitingan (STAR)	23,155	42.20%	55,542	8,056	62.65%
2022	P180 Keningau	Rasinin Kautis (WARISAN)	7,020	12.79%	Grelydia Gillod (DAP)	15,099	27.52%	55,542	8,056	62.65%
2022	P180 Keningau	Rasinin Kautis (WARISAN)	7,020	12.79%	Jake Nointin (KDM)	9,598	17.49%	55,542	8,056	62.65%

Sabah State Legislative Assembly
Year	Constituency	Candidate	Votes	Pct	Opponent(s)	Votes	Pct	Ballots cast	Majority	Turnout
2018	N34 Liawan	Rasinin Kautis (WARISAN)	6,387	47.75%	Sairin Karno (UMNO)	5,005	37.41%	13,610	1,382	79.30%
2018	N34 Liawan	Rasinin Kautis (WARISAN)	6,387	47.75%	Kong Fui Seng (STAR)	1,809	13.52%	13,610	1,382	79.30%
2018	N34 Liawan	Rasinin Kautis (WARISAN)	6,387	47.75%	Hussein Kassim (PCS)	176	1.32%	13,610	1,382	79.30%
2020	N41 Liawan	Rasinin Kautis (WARISAN)	3,987	33.70%	Annuar Ayub Aman (STAR)	4,628	39.12%	11,831	641	67.81%
2020	N41 Liawan	Rasinin Kautis (WARISAN)	3,987	33.70%	Jake Nointin (IND)	1,835	15.51%	11,831	641	67.81%
2020	N41 Liawan	Rasinin Kautis (WARISAN)	3,987	33.70%	Daniel Kinsik (PBS)	1,084	9.16%	11,831	641	67.81%
2020	N41 Liawan	Rasinin Kautis (WARISAN)	3,987	33.70%	Mazlan Abdul Latiff (PCS)	209	1.77%	11,831	641	67.81%
2020	N41 Liawan	Rasinin Kautis (WARISAN)	3,987	33.70%	Yatin Kukung (LDP)	45	0.38%	11,831	641	67.81%
2020	N41 Liawan	Rasinin Kautis (WARISAN)	3,987	33.70%	Leong Chau Chu (USNO Baru)	43	0.36%	11,831	641	67.81%

== Honours ==
- Sabah
  - Companion of the Order of Kinabalu (ASDK) (2018)
