= Liawan =

State constituency in Sabah, Malaysia

Liawan (N41)
Sabah constituency

State constituency
- Legislature: Sabah State Legislative Assembly
MLA
Nik Mohd Nadzri Nik Zawawi
BN
- Constituency created: 2003
- First contested: 2004
- Last contested: 2025

Demographics
- Electors (2025): 32,661

Liawan is a state constituency in Sabah, Malaysia, that is represented in the Sabah State Legislative Assembly.

== Demographics ==
As of 2020, Liawan has a population of 59,576 people.

Ethnic breakdown of Liawan's electorate as of 2025
1. Muslim Bumiputera (45.0%)
2. Non-Muslim Bumiputera (39.0%)
3. Chinese (16.0%)
4. Other ethnicities (0.00%)

== History ==
=== Polling districts ===
According to the gazette issued on 31 October 2022, the Liawan constituency has a total of 10 polling districts.

| State constituency | Polling Districts | Code | Location |
|---|---|---|---|
| Liawan（N41） | Luagan | 180/41/01 | SK Luagan |
| Liawan（N41） | Liawan | 180/41/02 | SK Kampung Keningau, Pamalan |
| Liawan（N41） | Patikang Laut | 180/41/03 | SK Bulu Silou |
| Liawan（N41） | Senagang | 180/41/04 | SK Senagang |
| Liawan（N41） | Meninpir | 180/41/05 | SJK (C) Yuk Kong |
| Liawan（N41） | Bayangan | 180/41/06 | SA Negeri Bayangan Keningau |
| Liawan（N41） | Masjid | 180/41/07 | SMK Gunsanad |
| Liawan（N41） | Limbawan | 180/41/08 | SK Pekan Keningau |
| Liawan（N41） | Mottou | 180/41/09 | Tadika Sabah Chinese Association Keningau |
| Liawan（N41） | Banjar | 180/41/10 | SK Banjar |

=== Representation history ===
Member of Sabah State Legislative Assembly for Liawan
| Assembly | No | Years | Member | Party |
Constituency created from Bingkor and Melalap
| 12th | N34 | 2004 – 2008 | Sairin Karno | BN (UMNO) |
| 13th | N34 | 2008 – 2013 | Sairin Karno | BN (UMNO) |
| 14th | N34 | 2013 – 2018 | Sairin Karno | BN (UMNO) |
| 15th | N34 | 2018 – 2020 | Rasinin Kautis | WARISAN |
| 16th | N41 | 2020 – 2025 | Annuar Ayub | GRS (STAR) |
| 16th | N41 | 2025 | Annuar Ayub | STAR |
| 17th | N41 | 2025–present | Nik Mohd Nadzri Nik Zawawi | BN (UMNO) |

== Election results ==
Sabah state election, 2025: Liawan
| Party | Candidate | Votes | % | ∆% |
|---|---|---|---|---|
| BN | Nik Mohd Nadzri Nik Zawawi | 5,882 | 28.33 | ▲28.33 |
| GRS | Annuar Ayub | 5,239 | 25.24 | ▲25.24 |
| Heritage | Adzhar Jasni Eddy | 4,142 | 19.95 | ▼13.16 |
| Homeland Solidarity Party | Augustine A Nain | 3,899 | 18.78 | ▲1878 |
| UPKO | Wilson Gan Poi Tze | 658 | 3.17 | ▲3.17 |
| KDM | Peter Paun | 501 | 2.41 | ▲2.14 |
| PN | Johny @ John Anthony | 272 | 1.31 | ▲1.31 |
| Sabah Clan Party | Yukilin Giging | 78 | 0.38 | ▲0.38 |
| Sabah Dream Party | Junadey Ejih | 51 | 0.25 | ▲0.25 |
| Sabah People's Unity Party | Mustazarmie Mustapha | 37 | 0.18 | ▲0.18 |
| Total valid votes | | 20,759 | | |
| Total rejected ballots | | 306 | | |
| Unreturned ballots | | 23 | | |
| Turnout | | 21,088 | 64.57 | ▼4.44 |
| Registered electors | | 32,661 | | |
| Majority | | 643 | 3.09 | ▼2.24 |
| BN gain from PN | | Swing | | ? |
Source(s) "RESULTS OF CONTESTED ELECTION AND STATEMENTS OF THE POLL AFTER THE OFFICIAL ADDITION OF VOTES" (PDF).

Sabah state election, 2020: Liawan
| Party | Candidate | Votes | % | ∆% |
|---|---|---|---|---|
| PN | Annuar Ayub | 4,628 | 38.44 | ▲25.15 |
| Sabah Heritage Party | Rasinin Kautis | 3,987 | 33.11 | ▼13.82 |
| Independent | Jake Nointin | 1,835 | 15.24 | ▲15.24 |
| PBS | Daniel Kinsik | 1,084 | 9.00 | ▲9.00 |
| Love Sabah Party | Mazlan Abdul Latiff | 209 | 1.74 | ▼0.45 |
| LDP | Yatin Kukung | 45 | 0.37 | ▲0.37 |
| USNO (Baru) | Leong Chau Chu | 43 | 0.36 | ▲0.36 |
| Total valid votes | | 11,831 | 98.26 | |
| Total rejected ballots | | 144 | 1.20 | |
| Unreturned ballots | | 65 | 0.54 | |
| Turnout | | 12,040 | 69.01 | ▼10.30 |
| Registered electors | | 17,446 | | |
| Majority | | 641 | 5.33 | ▼4.83 |
| PN gain from Sabah Heritage Party | | Swing | | ? |
Source(s) "RESULTS OF CONTESTED ELECTION AND STATEMENTS OF THE POLL AFTER THE OFFICIAL ADDITION OF VOTES".

Sabah state election, 2018: Liawan
| Party | Candidate | Votes | % | ∆% |
|---|---|---|---|---|
| Sabah Heritage Party | Rasinin Kautis | 6,387 | 46.93 | ▲46.93 |
| BN | Sairin Karno | 5,005 | 36.77 | ▼9.97 |
| STAR | Kong Fui Seng | 1,809 | 13.29 | ▼4.66 |
| Love Sabah Party | Hussein Kassim @ Jaimis Madatin | 176 | 1.29 | ▲1.29 |
| Total valid votes | | 13,377 | 98.29 | |
| Total rejected ballots | | 154 | 1.13 | |
| Unreturned ballots | | 79 | 0.58 | |
| Turnout | | 13,610 | 79.31 | ▼2.62 |
| Registered electors | | 17,161 | | |
| Majority | | 1,382 | 10.16 | ▼5.06 |
| Sabah Heritage Party gain from BN | | Swing | | ? |
Source(s) "RESULTS OF CONTESTED ELECTION AND STATEMENTS OF THE POLL AFTER THE OFFICIAL ADDITION OF VOTES".

Sabah state election, 2013: Liawan
| Party | Candidate | Votes | % | ∆% |
|---|---|---|---|---|
| BN | Sairin Karno | 5,383 | 46.74 | ▼12.93 |
| PKR | Paul Bunsu Gitang | 3,631 | 31.52 | ▼1.98 |
| STAR | Nicholas James Guntobon | 2,067 | 17.95 | ▲17.95 |
| SAPP | Pauket Yadiloh @ Jahari Tahir | 236 | 2.05 | ▲2.05 |
| Independent | Nusleh Madarak | 18 | 0.16 | ▲0.16 |
| Total valid votes | | 11,315 | 98.41 | |
| Total rejected ballots | | 172 | 1.49 | |
| Unreturned ballots | | 11 | 0.10 | |
| Turnout | | 11,518 | 81.93 | ▲10.88 |
| Registered electors | | 14,056 | | |
| Majority | | 1,752 | 15.22 | ▼10.95 |
| BN hold | | Swing | | |
Source(s) "KEPUTUSAN PILIHAN RAYA UMUM DEWAN UNDANGAN NEGERI".

Sabah state election, 2008: Liawan
| Party | Candidate | Votes | % | ∆% |
|---|---|---|---|---|
| BN | Sairin Karno | 4,661 | 59.67 | ▼11.04 |
| PKR | Jius Awang | 2,617 | 33.50 | ▲33.50 |
| DAP | Yangul Modiadau @ Lawrence Edau | 286 | 3.66 | ▲3.66 |
| Independent | Yapilin Nawawi | 104 | 1.33 | ▲1.33 |
| Total valid votes | | 7,668 | 98.17 | |
| Total rejected ballots | | 143 | 1.83 | |
| Unreturned ballots | | 0 | 0.00 | |
| Turnout | | 7,811 | 71.05 | ▲7.38 |
| Registered electors | | 10,994 | | |
| Majority | | 2,044 | 26.17 | ▼23.44 |
| BN hold | | Swing | | |
Source(s) "KEPUTUSAN PILIHAN RAYA UMUM DEWAN UNDANGAN NEGERI SABAH BAGI TAHUN 2008".

Sabah state election, 2004: Liawan
| Party | Candidate | Votes | % |
|---|---|---|---|
| BN | Sairin Karno | 4,709 | 70.71 |
| Independent | Lawrence Gimbang | 1,405 | 21.10 |
| Independent | Paul Kadau | 476 | 7.15 |
| Total valid votes | | 6,590 | 98.95 |
| Total rejected ballots | | 67 | 1.01 |
| Unreturned ballots | | 3 | 0.05 |
| Turnout | | 6,660 | 63.67 |
| Registered electors | | 10,461 | |
| Majority | | 3,304 | 49.61 |
This was a new constituency created.
Source(s) "KEPUTUSAN PILIHAN RAYA UMUM DEWAN UNDANGAN NEGERI SABAH BAGI TAHUN 2004".
