= Minister of Foreign Affairs (Malaysia) =

Cabinet minister in Malaysia

- Menteri Luar Negeri

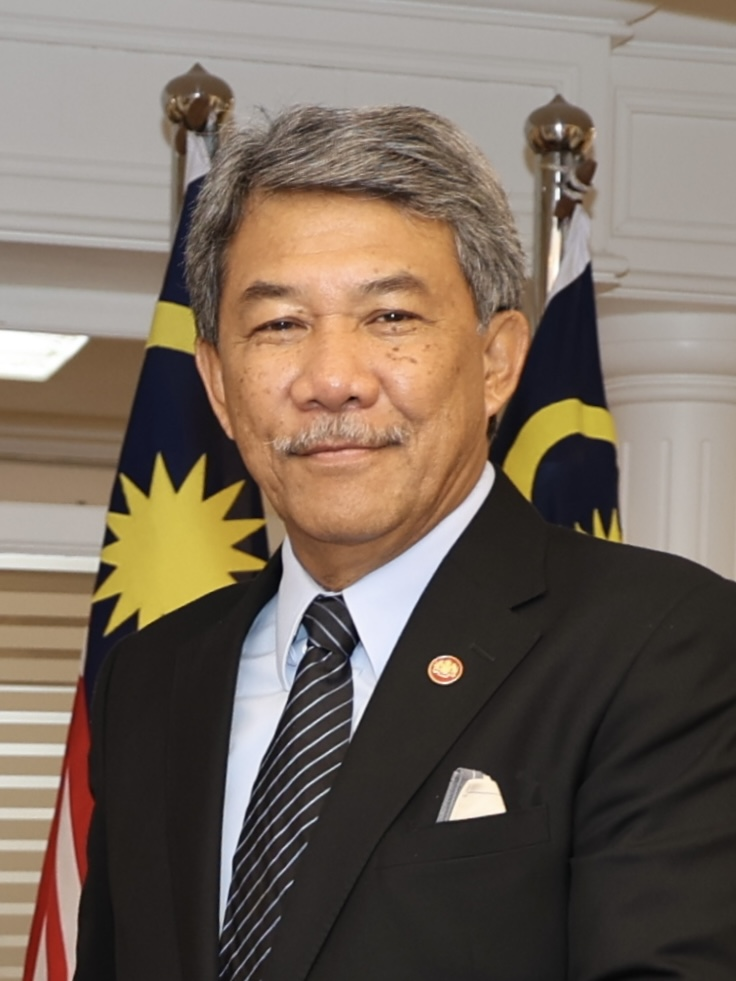
- Incumbent; Mohamad Hasan since 12 December 2023
- Ministry of Foreign Affairs
- Style: Yang Berhormat Menteri (The Honourable Minister)
- Abbreviation: KLN/MOFA/WISMA PUTRA
- Member of: Cabinet of Malaysia
- Reports to: Parliament of Malaysia
- Seat: Putrajaya
- Appointer: Yang di-Pertuan Agong on the recommendation of the Prime Minister of Malaysia
- Formation: 31 August 1957
- First holder: Tunku Abdul Rahman as Minister of External Affairs
- Deputy: Lukanisman Awang Sauni
- Website: www.kln.gov.my

The current Minister of Foreign Affairs (Malay: Menteri Luar Negeri; Jawi: منتري لوار نڬري) of Malaysia has been Mohamad Hasan since 12 December 2023. The minister is deputised by the Deputy Minister of Foreign Affairs, Lukanisman Awang Sauni, since 17 December 2025. The minister administers the portfolio through the Ministry of Foreign Affairs.

== List of ministers ==
=== Foreign Affairs ===
The following individuals have been appointed Minister of Foreign Affairs/External affairs, or any of its precedent titles:

Political party: Alliance/BN PH PN

Portrait	Name (Birth–Death) Constituency	Political party	Title	Took office	Left office	Deputy Minister	Prime Minister (Cabinet)
	Tunku Abdul Rahman (1903–1990) (Prime Minister); MP for Sungei Muda	Alliance (UMNO)	Minister of External Affairs	31 August 1957	2 February 1959	Vacant	Tunku Abdul Rahman (I)
	Ismail Abdul Rahman (1915–1973); MP for Johore Timor	Alliance (UMNO)	Minister of External Affairs	3 February 1959	31 August 1960	Vacant	Tunku Abdul Rahman (II)
	Tunku Abdul Rahman (1903–1990); MP for Kuala Kedah	Alliance (UMNO)	Minister of Foreign Affairs	1 September 1960	22 September 1970	Vacant	Tunku Abdul Rahman (II · III · IV)
	Abdul Razak Hussein (1922–1976); MP for Pekan	Alliance (UMNO)	Minister of Foreign Affairs	23 September 1970	12 August 1975	Vacant	Abdul Razak Hussein (I · II)
	Abdul Razak Hussein (1922–1976); MP for Pekan	BN (UMNO)	Minister of Foreign Affairs	23 September 1970	12 August 1975	Vacant	Abdul Razak Hussein (I · II)
	Tengku Ahmad Rithauddeen Tengku Ismail (1928–2022); MP for Kota Bharu	BN (UMNO)	Minister of Foreign Affairs	13 August 1975	16 July 1981	Vacant	Abdul Razak Hussein (II); Hussein Onn (I · II)
	Ghazali Shafie (1922–2010); MP for Lipis	BN (UMNO)	Minister of Foreign Affairs	17 July 1981	16 July 1984	Vacant (1981–1983); Abdul Kadir Sheikh Fadzir (1983–1986)	Mahathir Mohamad (I · II)
	Tengku Ahmad Rithauddeen Tengku Ismail (1928–2022); MP for Kota Bharu	BN (UMNO)	Minister of Foreign Affairs	17 July 1984	10 August 1986	Abdul Kadir Sheikh Fadzir	Mahathir Mohamad (II)
	Rais Yatim (b. 1942); MP for Jelebu	BN (UMNO)	Minister of Foreign Affairs	11 August 1986	7 May 1987	Abdul Kadir Sheikh Fadzir	Mahathir Mohamad (III)
	Abu Hassan Omar (1940–2018); MP for Kuala Selangor	BN (UMNO)	Minister of Foreign Affairs	20 May 1987	14 March 1991	Abdullah Fadzil Che Wan	Mahathir Mohamad (III · IV)
	Abdullah Ahmad Badawi (1939–2025); MP for Kepala Batas	BN (UMNO)	Minister of Foreign Affairs	15 March 1991	8 January 1999	Abdullah Fadzil Che Wan (1991–1995); Leo Michael Toyad (1995–1999)	Mahathir Mohamad (IV · V)
	Syed Hamid Albar (b. 1944); MP for Kota Tinggi	BN (UMNO)	Minister of Foreign Affairs	9 January 1999	18 March 2008	Leo Michael Toyad (1995–2004); Joseph Salang Gandum (2004–2008)	Mahathir Mohamad (VI); Abdullah Ahmad Badawi (I · II)
	Rais Yatim (b. 1942); MP for Jelebu	BN (UMNO)	Minister of Foreign Affairs	19 March 2008	8 April 2009	Abdul Rahim Bakri	Abdullah Ahmad Badawi (III)
	Anifah Aman (b. 1953); MP for Kimanis	BN (UMNO)	Minister of Foreign Affairs	10 April 2009	9 May 2018	A. Kohillan Pillay (2009–2013); Lee Chee Leong (2009–2010); Richard Riot Jaem (2010–2013); Hamzah Zainuddin (2013–2015); Reezal Merican Naina Merican (2015–2018)	Najib Razak (I · II)
	Saifuddin Abdullah (b. 1961); MP for Indera Mahkota	PH (PKR)	Minister of Foreign Affairs	2 July 2018	24 February 2020	Marzuki Yahya	Mahathir Mohamad (VII)
	Hishammuddin Hussein (b. 1961) (Senior Minister); MP for Sembrong	BN (UMNO)	Minister of Foreign Affairs	10 March 2020	7 July 2021	Kamarudin Jaffar	Muhyiddin Yassin (I)
	Hishammuddin Hussein (b. 1961) (Senior Minister); MP for Sembrong	BN (UMNO)	Senior Minister of Foreign Affairs	7 July 2021	16 August 2021	Kamarudin Jaffar	Muhyiddin Yassin (I)
	Saifuddin Abdullah (b. 1961); MP for Indera Mahkota	PN (BERSATU)	Minister of Foreign Affairs	30 August 2021	24 November 2022	Kamarudin Jaffar	Ismail Sabri Yaakob (I)
	Zambry Abdul Kadir (b. 1962); Senator	BN (UMNO)	Minister of Foreign Affairs	3 December 2022	12 December 2023	Mohamad Alamin	Anwar Ibrahim (I)
	Mohamad Hasan (b. 1956); MP for Rembau	BN (UMNO)	Minister of Foreign Affairs	12 December 2023	Incumbent	Mohamad Alamin (2023–2025); Lukanisman Awang Sauni (2025–present)	Anwar Ibrahim (I)
