= Bongawan (state constituency) =

State constituency in Sabah, Malaysia

Bongawan (N30)
Sabah constituency

State constituency
- Legislature: Sabah State Legislative Assembly
MLA
Daud Yusof
Heritage
- Constituency created: 1967
- First contested: 1967
- Last contested: 2025

Demographics
- Electors (2025): 24,019

Bongawan is a state constituency in Sabah, Malaysia, that is represented in the Sabah State Legislative Assembly.

== Demographics ==
As of 2020, Bongawan has a population of 31,844 people.

Ethnic breakdown of Bongawan's electorate as of 2025
1. Muslim Bumiputera (66.0%)
2. Non-Muslim Bumiputera (30.0%)
3. Chinese (3.00%)
4. Other ethnicities (1.00%)

== History ==
=== Poling districts ===
According to the gazette issued on 31 October 2022, the Bongawan constituency has a total of 10 polling districts.

State constituency	Poling Districts	Code	Location
Bongawan（N30）	Batu Enam	176/30/01	SK Our Lady; SK Kelatuan; SK Langkawit; SK Lingan
Bongawan（N30）	Kabang	176/30/02	SK Kayau; SK Kambizaan
Bongawan（N30）	Gadong	176/30/03	SK Belatik
Bongawan（N30）	Bongawan	176/30/04	SK Nyaris-Nyaris
Bongawan（N30）	Kimanis Mandahan	176/30/05	SMK Kimanis
Bongawan（N30）	Kimanis Estate	176/30/06	SMA Kimanis
Bongawan（N30）	Simpangan	176/30/07	SJK (C) Cheng Ming
Bongawan（N30）	Kuala Pus	176/30/08	SK Sumbiling
Bongawan（N30）	Bongawan Estate	176/30/09	SK Viging Ulu
Bongawan（N30）	Seladan	176/30/10	SMK Bongawan

=== Representation history ===
Member of Sabah State Legislative Assembly for Bongawan
Assembly	Years	Member	Party
Constituency created
3rd	1967 – 1971	Mulkiaman Sherzeman	Alliance (USNO)
4th	1971 – 1976	Aliudin Harun	Alliance (USNO)
5th	1976 – 1981	Dzulkifli Abdul Hamid	Alliance (USNO)
6th	1981 – 1985	Abdul Hamid Kanizaman	BN (BERJAYA)
7th	1985 – 1986	Ibrahim Pengiran Dewa	USNO
8th	1986 – 1987	Abdul Karim Abdul Ghani	USNO
8th	1987 – 1990	Abdul Ghani Bidin	PBS
9th	1990 – 1994	Karim Bujang	BN (USNO)
10th	1994 – 1999	Karim Bujang	BN (UMNO)
11th	1999 – 2004	Karim Bujang	BN (UMNO)
12th	2004 – 2008	Karim Bujang	BN (UMNO)
13th	2008 – 2013	Karim Bujang	BN (UMNO)
14th	2013 – 2018	Mohamad Alamin	BN (UMNO)
15th	2018 – 2020	Daud Yusof	WARISAN
16th	2020 – 2025	Daud Yusof	WARISAN
17th	2025–present	Daud Yusof	WARISAN

== Election results ==
Sabah state election, 2025
Party	Candidate	Votes	%	∆%
Heritage	Daud Yusof	5,542	30.70	▼10.70
GRS	Anifah Aman	4,604	25.50	▲25.50
BN	Mohamad Alamin	4,569	25.31	▼1.89
KDM	Peter Matinjal	1,868	10.35	▲10.35
Homeland Solidarity Party	Dolores Michael	801	4.44	▲4.44
PN	Ridzuan Agus Payong	465	2.58	▲2.58
Independent	Md Haris Md Tahir	86	0.48	▲0.48
Sabah Dream Party	Royston Adven	76	0.42	▲0.42
Sabah People's Unity Party	Hussin Dasar	43	0.24	▲0.42
Total valid votes		18,054		
Total rejected ballots		286		
Unreturned ballots		10		
Turnout		18,350	76.40	▼1.54
Registered electors		24,019		
Majority		938	5.20	▼8.62
Sabah Heritage Party hold		Swing		
Source(s) "RESULTS OF CONTESTED ELECTION AND STATEMENTS OF THE POLL AFTER THE OFFICIAL ADDITION OF VOTES" (PDF).

Sabah state election, 2020
Party	Candidate	Votes	%	∆%
Sabah Heritage Party	Daud Yusof	5,400	41.40	▼8.14
Love Sabah Party	Anifah Aman	3,598	27.58	▲27.58
BN	Ag Syairin	3,548	27.20	▼16.64
LDP	Mohd Azree Abdul Ghani	232	1.78	▲1.78
Total valid votes		12,778	97.96	
Total rejected ballots		236	1.81	
Unreturned ballots		30	0.23	
Turnout		13,044	77.94	▼7.98
Registered electors		16,735		
Majority		1,802	13.82	▲8.12
Sabah Heritage Party hold		Swing		
Source(s) "RESULTS OF CONTESTED ELECTION AND STATEMENTS OF THE POLL AFTER THE OFFICIAL ADDITION OF VOTES".

Sabah state election, 2018
Party	Candidate	Votes	%	∆%
Sabah Heritage Party	Daud Yusof	6,912	49.54	▲49.54
BN	Mohamad Alamin	6,117	43.84	▼13.90
Sabah People's Hope Party	Jaafar Ismail	627	4.49	▲4.49
Total valid votes		13,656	97.87	
Total rejected ballots		228	1.63	
Unreturned ballots		69	0.49	
Turnout		13,953	85.92	▼0.88
Registered electors		16,239		
Majority		795	5.70	▼20.61
Sabah Heritage Party gain from BN		Swing		-
Source(s) "RESULTS OF CONTESTED ELECTION AND STATEMENTS OF THE POLL AFTER THE OFFICIAL ADDITION OF VOTES".

Sabah state election, 2013
Party	Candidate	Votes	%	∆%
BN	Mohamad Alamin	7,443	57.74	▼15.61
PKR	Ibrahim Menudin	4,051	31.43	▲22.42
Independent	Ak Aliuddin Pg Mohd Tahir	455	3.53	▲3.53
SAPP	Awang Talip Awang Bagul	335	2.60	▲2.60
STAR	Assim @ Hassim Matali	321	2.49	▲2.49
Total valid votes		12,605	97.78	
Total rejected ballots		261	2.02	
Unreturned ballots		25	0.19	
Turnout		12,891	86.80	▲8.42
Registered electors		14,851		
Majority		3,392	26.31	▼32.70
BN hold		Swing		
Source(s) "KEPUTUSAN PILIHAN RAYA UMUM DEWAN UNDANGAN NEGERI".

Sabah state election, 2008
Party	Candidate	Votes	%	∆%
BN	Karim Bujang	7,123	73.35	▲20.96
Independent	Mohd Haris Mohd Tahir	1,393	14.34	▼28.56
PKR	Ag Wasli Ag Yahya	875	9.01	▲9.01
BERSEKUTU	Lusin Balangon	97	1.00	▲1.00
Total valid votes		9,488	97.70	
Total rejected ballots		218	2.24	
Unreturned ballots		5	0.05	
Turnout		9,711	78.38	▲8.35
Registered electors		12,389		
Majority		5,730	59.01	▲49.52
BN hold		Swing		
Source(s) "KEPUTUSAN PILIHAN RAYA UMUM DEWAN UNDANGAN NEGERI SABAH BAGI TAHUN 2008".

Sabah state election, 2004
Party	Candidate	Votes	%	∆%
BN	Karim Bujang	4,444	52.39	▼5.55
Independent	Mohd Haris Mohd Tahir	3,639	42.90	▲42.90
Total valid votes		8,083	95.28	
Total rejected ballots		191	2.25	
Unreturned ballots		209	2.46	
Turnout		8,483	70.03	▼6.88
Registered electors		12,113		
Majority		805	9.49	▼12.61
BN hold		Swing		
Source(s) "KEPUTUSAN PILIHAN RAYA UMUM DEWAN UNDANGAN NEGERI SABAH BAGI TAHUN 2004".

Sabah state election, 1999
Party	Candidate	Votes	%	∆%
BN	Karim Bujang	6,087	57.94	▼0.23
PBS	Awang Tengah Awang Amin	3,765	35.84	▼2.21
Independent	Ajmain Abdul Gani	343	3.27	▲0.35
BERSEKUTU	Dzulkifli Abdul Hamid	163	1.55	▲1.55
SETIA	Abdul Karim Abdul Ghani	54	0.51	▲0.51
Total valid votes		10,412	99.11	
Total rejected ballots		63	0.60	
Unreturned ballots		30	0.29	
Turnout		10,505	76.91	▼2.72
Registered electors		13,659		
Majority		2,292	22.10	▲1.98
BN hold		Swing		
Source(s) "KEPUTUSAN PILIHAN RAYA UMUM DEWAN UNDANGAN NEGERI SABAH BAGI TAHUN 1999".

Sabah state election, 1994
Party	Candidate	Votes	%	∆%
BN	Karim Bujang	5,498	58.17	▲58.17
PBS	Narawi Ahmad @ Sinar	3,596	38.05	▼6.24
Independent	Ajmain Abdul Gani	276	2.92	▲2.92
Total valid votes		9,370	99.14	
Total rejected ballots		81	0.86	
Unreturned ballots		0	0.00	
Turnout		9,451	79.63	▼0.43
Registered electors		11,868		
Majority		1,902	20.12	▲18.52
BN gain from USNO		Swing		?
Source(s) "KEPUTUSAN PILIHAN RAYA UMUM DEWAN UNDANGAN NEGERI SABAH BAGI TAHUN 1994".

Sabah state election, 1990
Party	Candidate	Votes	%	∆%
USNO	Karim Bujang	3,631	45.89	▼0.08
PBS	Abdul Ghani Bidin	3,504	44.29	▼8.88
BERJAYA	Ibrahim Kalali	328	4.15	▲4.15
PRS	Sukaimi Suradi	194	2.45	▲2.45
AKAR	Yusoff Mohd Said	169	2.14	▲2.14
Total valid votes		7,826	98.91	
Total rejected ballots		86	1.09	
Unreturned ballots		0	0.00	
Turnout		7,912	80.06	
Registered electors		9,882		
Majority		127	1.60	
USNO gain from PBS		Swing		?
Source(s) "KEPUTUSAN PILIHAN RAYA UMUM DEWAN UNDANGAN NEGERI SABAH BAGI TAHUN 1990".

Sabah state by-election, 19 September 1987 Upon the resignation of incumbent, Abdul Karim Abdul Ghani
Party	Candidate	Votes	%	∆%
PBS	Abdul Ghani Bidin	3,279	53.17	▲12.90
USNO	Pengiran Aliuddin Pengiran Tahir	2,835	45.97	▲3.33
Total valid votes		6,114	99.14	
Total rejected ballots		53	0.86	
Unreturned ballots		0	0.00	
Turnout		6,167	68.51	▼8.45
Registered electors		9,001		
Majority		444	7.20	▲4.83
PBS gain from USNO		Swing		?
Source(s) "Usno's defeat in Bongawan was expected". New Straits Times. 1987-09-21.

Sabah state election, 1986
Party	Candidate	Votes	%	∆%
USNO	Abdul Karim Abdul Ghani	2,715	42.64	▲3.73
PBS	George Ng Shee Wah	2,564	40.27	▲2.99
Independent	Ak Aliuddin Pg Mohd Tahir	689	10.82	▲10.82
BERJAYA	Andrew Mudi	149	2.34	▼16.61
Independent	Chong Ah Tan @ Chong Tuck Foong	142	2.23	▲2.23
Independent	Chua Hu Thiam	66	1.04	▲1.04
Total valid votes		6,325	99.34	
Total rejected ballots		42	0.66	
Unreturned ballots		0	0.00	
Turnout		6,367	76.96	▲2.10
Registered electors		8,273		
Majority		151	2.37	▲0.74
USNO hold		Swing		
Source(s) "KEPUTUSAN PILIHAN RAYA UMUM DEWAN UNDANGAN NEGERI SABAH BAGI TAHUN 1986".

Sabah state election, 1985
Party	Candidate	Votes	%	∆%
USNO	Ibrahim Pengiran Dewa	2,144	39.70	▲3.87
PBS	George Ng Shee Wah	2,054	38.04	▲38.04
BERJAYA	Abdul Hamid Awang	1,044	19.33	▼19.57
BERSEPADU	Omar Muhammad	158	2.93	▲2.93
Total valid votes		5,400	100.00	
Total rejected ballots		110		
Unreturned ballots		0		
Turnout		5,510	74.86	▼2.83
Registered electors		7,360		
Majority		90	1.67	▼1.39
USNO gain from BERJAYA		Swing		?
Source(s) "How they fared". New Straits Times. 1985-04-22.

Sabah state election, 1981
Party	Candidate	Votes	%	∆%
BERJAYA	Abdul Hamid Awang	1,714	38.90	▼2.49
USNO	Pengiran Abdul Rahman Pengiran Ali	1,579	35.83	▼22.78
Independent	AK Aliuddin Pengiran Tahir	874	19.83	▲19.83
Independent	Hussein Aman	124	2.81	▲2.81
Independent	Lai Teck Lan @ Francis Teck Lan Lai Lai	116	2.63	▲2.63
Total valid votes		4,407	100.00	
Total rejected ballots		63		
Unreturned ballots		0		
Turnout		4,470	77.69	▼6.72
Registered electors		5,754		
Majority		135	3.06	▼14.16
BERJAYA gain from USNO		Swing		?
Source(s) "Sabah election: How they fared". New Straits Times. 1981-03-29.

Sabah state election, 1976
Party	Candidate	Votes	%	∆%
USNO	Dzulkifli Abdul Hamid	2,362	58.61	
BERJAYA	Pengiran Abu Bakar Pengiran Ahmad	1,668	41.39	
Total valid votes		4,030	100.00	
Total rejected ballots		135		
Unreturned ballots		0		
Turnout		4,165	84.41	
Registered electors		4,934		
Majority		694	17.22	
USNO hold		Swing		

Sabah state election, 1971
Party	Candidate	Votes	%	∆%
On the nomination day, Aliuddin Harun won uncontested.
USNO	Aliuddin Harun			
Total valid votes				
Total rejected ballots				
Unreturned ballots				
Turnout				
Registered electors		0		
Majority				
USNO hold		Swing		

Sabah state election, 1967
Party	Candidate	Votes	%
USNO	Sherzeman Mulkiaman Sherzeman	3,784	56.06
UPKO	Pengiran Abu Bakar Pengiran Ahmad	2,966	43.94
Total valid votes		6,750	100.00
Total rejected ballots		193	
Unreturned ballots		0	
Turnout		6,943	92.08
Registered electors		7,540	
Majority		818	12.12
This was a new constituency created
